= 2021–22 Newcastle Jets FC season =

2021–22 Newcastle Jets Football Championship

Newcastle Jets
2021–22 season
- Chairman: Shane Mattiske
- Manager: Arthur Papas
- Stadium: McDonald Jones Stadium
- A-League Men: 9th
- FFA Cup: Play-off
- Top goalscorer: League: Beka Mikeltadze (13 goals); All: Beka Mikeltadze (13 goals)
- Highest home attendance: 6,424 (21 November 2021 vs. Central Coast Mariners
- Lowest home attendance: 3,109 (3 February 2022 vs. Brisbane Roar
- Average home league attendance: 4,843
Home colours	Away colours	Third colours

The 2021–22 season was Newcastle Jets' 21st season since its establishment in 2000. The club participated in the A-League for the 17th time.

== Players ==
Note: Flags indicate national team as defined under FIFA eligibility rules; some limited exceptions apply. Players may hold more than one non-FIFA nationality.

No.	Pos.	Nation	Player
1	GK	AUS	Jack Duncan
2	DF	NZL	Dane Ingham
3	DF	AUS	Jason Hoffman
4	DF	AUS	Jordan Elsey
5	MF	AUS	Ben Kantarovski
6	DF	AUS	Matthew Jurman (captain)
7	MF	AUS	Jordan O'Doherty
8	MF	ESP	Mario Arqués
9	FW	GEO	Beka Mikeltadze
10	FW	CMR	Olivier Boumal
11	MF	BRA	Daniel Penha (on loan from Atlético Mineiro)
13	MF	AUS	Brandon Wilson
14	DF	AUS	Mohamed Al-Taay

No.	Pos.	Nation	Player
15	DF	AUS	Dylan Murnane
16	MF	AUS	Kosta Grozos
17	FW	SSD	Valentino Yuel
19	DF	AUS	Taylor Regan
20	GK	AUS	Michael Weier
21	MF	GRE	Savvas Siatravanis
23	FW	AUS	Eli Babalj
25	MF	AUS	Samuel Silvera (on loan from Paços de Ferreira)
26	FW	AUS	Archie Goodwin (Scholarship)
27	DF	AUS	Lucas Mauragis
28	FW	AUS	Blake Archbold (Scholarship)
32	MF	AUS	Angus Thurgate
44	DF	AUS	Riley Warland

== Transfers ==
=== Transfers in ===
No.	Position	Player	Transferred from	Type/fee	Contract length	Date	Ref
—	DF	James Donachie	(India) Goa	End of loan	(2 years)	17 June 2021	
—	FW	(New Zealand) Joe Champness	Brisbane Roar	End of loan	(1 year)	17 June 2021	
30	GK	Noah James	Western Sydney Wanderers	End of loan	(2 years)	25 June 2021	
—	MF	Cameron Devlin	Unattached	Free transfer	2 years	28 June 2021	
6	DF	Matthew Jurman	Unattached	Free transfer	2 years	1 July 2021	
2	DF	(New Zealand) Dane Ingham	Unattached	Free transfer	2 years	2 July 2021	
14	DF	Mohamed Al-Taay	Unattached	Free transfer	1 year	5 July 2021	
44	DF	Riley Warland	Unattached	Free transfer	2 years	6 July 2021	
9	FW	(Georgia (country)) Beka Mikeltadze	(Greece) Xanthi	Free transfer	2 years	7 July 2021	
4	DF	Jordan Elsey	Unattached	Free transfer	2 years	8 July 2021	
10	FW	(Cameroon) Olivier Boumal	Unattached	Free transfer	1 year	18 August 2021	
15	DF	Dylan Murnane	(Finland) HJK Helsinki	Free transfer	1 year	19 August 2021	
11	MF	(Brazil) Daniel Penha	(Brazil) Atlético Mineiro	Loan	1 year	20 August 2021	
25	MF	Samuel Silvera	(Portugal) Paços de Ferreira	Loan	1 year	20 August 2021	
21	MF	(Greece) Savvas Siatravanis	Unattached	Free transfer	1 year	8 September 2021	
16	MF	Kosta Grozos	Unattached	Free transfer	1 year	15 September 2021	
50	GK	Michael Weier	(Australia) Hume City	Free transfer	1 year	17 September 2021	
23	FW	Eli Babalj	Unattached	Free transfer	1 year	12 October 2021	
8	MF	(Spain) Mario Arqués	Unattached	Free transfer	1 year	13 October 2021	
19	DF	Taylor Regan	Unattached	Free transfer	5 months	19 January 2022	
13	MF	Brandon Wilson	Unattached	Free transfer	4 months	28 February 2022	
30	GK	Nate Cavaliere	(Australia) Broadmeadow Magic	Loan	1 game	25 March 2022	

=== Transfers out ===
No.	Position	Player	Transferred to	Type/fee	Date	Ref
4	DF	Nigel Boogaard	Retired		11 June 2021	
14	MF	(Iraq) Ali Abbas	Unattached	End of contract	11 June 2021	
9	FW	(Republic of Ireland) Roy O'Donovan	Unattached	End of contract	11 June 2021	
16	DF	Matthew Millar	Unattached	End of contract	11 June 2021	
25	MF	Jack Simmons	Unattached	End of contract	11 June 2021	
21	MF	Luka Prso	(Croatia) Osijek	End of loan	11 June 2021	
11	MF	Ramy Najjarine	Melbourne City	End of loan	11 June 2021	
15	MF	Tete Yengi	Unattached	End of contract	15 June 2021	
18	MF	Jack Armson	Unattached	End of contract	15 June 2021	
1	GK	Lewis Italiano	Unattached	Mutual contract termination	4 July 2021	
2	DF	John Koutroumbis	Unattached	Mutual contract termination	16 July 2021	
24	DF	Connor O'Toole	Sydney FC	Mutual contract termination	16 July 2021	
—	DF	James Donachie	Sydney FC	Mutual contract termination	16 July 2021	
44	DF	Nikolai Topor-Stanley	Unattached	End of contract	26 July 2021	
33	FW	Apostolos Stamatelopoulos	(Greece) Rodos	End of contract	2 August 2021	
—	FW	(New Zealand) Joe Champness	(Turkey) Giresunspor	Undisclosed	20 August 2021	
—	MF	Cameron Devlin	(Scotland) Heart of Midlothian	Undisclosed	31 August 2021	
19	FW	Kosta Petratos	(Cyprus) Olympias Lympion	Mutual contract termination	28 December 2021	
30	GK	Noah James	(Australia) Dandenong Thunder	Loan	10 February 2022	
30	GK	Nate Cavaliere	(Australia) Broadmeadow Magic	End of loan	29 March 2022	

=== Contract extensions ===
No.	Name	Position	Duration	Date	Notes
7	Jordan O'Doherty	Midfielder	1 year	30 June 2021	

== Technical staff ==
Position	Name
Manager	(Australia) Arthur Papas
Head coach	(Australia) Arthur Diles
Assistant coach	(Australia) Huss Skenderovic
Goalkeeping coach	(Australia) Chris Bowling
Head of analysis and individual development	(Italy) Riccardo Marchioli
Physiotherapist	(Australia) Nathan Renwick

== Pre-season and friendlies ==
26 October 2021	Sydney FC	5–0	Newcastle Jets	Sydney, Australia
	Kamsoba 7'; Burgess 22'; Le Fondre 58'; Barbarouses 83'; Buhagiar 117'	Report		Stadium: Sydney FC training ground Attendance: 0 (behind closed doors); Referee: Craig Fisher
Note: The match was played over three 45 minute periods

6 November 2021	Macarthur FC	3–6	Newcastle Jets	Sydney, Australia
	?; ?; ?	Report	Mikeltadze; Silvera; Siatravanis; Penha; Yuel; Petratos	Stadium: Fairfield Showground; Attendance: 0 (behind closed doors)
Note: The teams played an extra 30 minutes following full-time

== Competitions ==
Win Draw Loss Cancelled or postponed

=== Competition overview ===
Competition	Record							
Competition	P	W	D	L	GF	GA	GD	Win %
A-League	26	8	5	13	45	43	+2	30.77
FFA Cup	1	0	0	1	1	2	−1	0.00
Australia Cup	1	1	0	0	3	1	+2	100.00
Total	28	9	5	14	49	46	+3	32.14

Updated to match played 12 May 2022
Source: Competitions

=== FFA Cup ===
13 November 2021 Preliminary rounds	Western United	2–1	Newcastle Jets	Geelong
19:00 AEDT	Wales 44'; Prijović 79'	Report	Penha 63'	Stadium: GMHBA Stadium; Attendance: 1,127; Referee: Jonathan Barreiro

=== Australia Cup ===
12 May 2022 Preliminary rounds	Newcastle Jets	3–1	Perth Glory	Newcastle
19:30 AEST	Elsey 25'; Penha 30'; Goodwin 90+3'	Report	Vecchio 71'	Stadium: McDonald Jones Stadium

=== A-League ===
==== League table ====
Pos	Team	Pld	W	D	L	GF	GA	GD	Pts	Qualification
7	Macarthur FC	26	9	6	11	38	47	−9	33	
8	Sydney FC	26	8	7	11	37	44	−7	31	
9	Newcastle Jets	26	8	5	13	45	43	+2	29	Qualification for 2022 Australia Cup play-offs (Note: The top 8 teams qualify for the round of 32, while the bottom four teams participate in a play-off round.)
10	Western Sydney Wanderers	26	6	9	11	30	38	−8	27	Qualification for 2022 Australia Cup play-offs
11	Brisbane Roar	26	7	5	14	29	39	−10	26	Qualification for 2022 Australia Cup play-offs

Source: A-Leagues
Rules for classification: 1) Points; 2) Goal difference; 3) Goals scored; 4) Points per game; 5) Least red cards; 6) Least yellow cards; 7) Toss of a coin in an event of a tie of two clubs.

==== Matches ====
21 November 2021 1	Newcastle Jets	1–2	Central Coast Mariners	Newcastle
16:05 AEDT	Yuel 78'	Report	Nisbet 50'; Farrell 57'	Stadium: McDonald Jones Stadium; Attendance: 6,424; Referee: Kurt Ams

28 November 2021 2	Western Sydney Wanderers	2–2	Newcastle Jets	Sydney
18:15 AEDT	Ibini 42'; Hemed 49'	Report	Mikeltadze 19' (pen.); Boumal 52'	Stadium: CommBank Stadium; Attendance: 8,003; Referee: Ben Abraham

4 December 2021 3	Sydney FC	2–2	Newcastle Jets FC	Sydney
19:45 AEDT	Le Fondre 9' (pen.); Kamsoba 30'	Report	Yuel 58', 65'	Stadium: Netstrata Jubilee Stadium; Attendance: 6,943; Referee: Jonathon Barreiro

10 December 2021 4	Newcastle Jets	4–0	Wellington Phoenix	Newcastle
19:45 AEDT	Mikeltadze 32', 52'; Murnane 69'; Penha 80'	Report		Stadium: McDonald Jones Stadium; Attendance: 6,332; Referee: Lachlan Keevers

19 December 2021 5	Macarthur FC	2–1	Newcastle Jets	Sydney
16:05 AEDT	De Silva 48'; Meredith 84'	Report	Mikeltadze 35'	Stadium: Campbelltown Stadium; Attendance: 2,691; Referee: Alex King

30 January 2022 12	Newcastle Jets	1–2	Adelaide United	Newcastle
18:45 AEDT	Mikeltadze 59'	Report	Irankunda 88'; Ibusuki 90'	Stadium: McDonald Jones Stadium; Attendance: 6,040; Referee: Alex King

3 February 2022 13	Newcastle Jets	2–1	Brisbane Roar	Newcastle
19:45 AEDT	Freke 22' (o.g.); Thurgate 70'	Report	Lescano 64'	Stadium: McDonald Jones Stadium; Attendance: 3,109; Referee: Jonathon Barreiro

8 February 2022 7	Newcastle Jets	2–4	Melbourne City	Newcastle
20:05 AEDT	Mikeltadze 59' (pen.); Thurgate 84'	Report	Warland 40' (o.g.); Maclaren 52', 66'; Leckie 56'	Stadium: McDonald Jones Stadium; Attendance: 3,403; Referee: Alireza Faghani

12 February 2022 14	Melbourne Victory	1–2	Newcastle Jets	Melbourne
19:45 AEDT	Brimmer 47'	Report	Yuel 57'; Mikeltadze 70' (pen.)	Stadium: AAMI Park; Attendance: 7,181; Referee: Daniel Elder

18 February 2022 15	Melbourne City	3–0	Newcastle Jets	Melbourne
19:45 AEDT	Maclaren 45+2'; Leckie 52'; Jenkinson 64'	Report		Stadium: AAMI Park; Attendance: 4,294; Referee: Tim Danaskos

23 February 2022 6	Newcastle Jets	1–0	Western Sydney Wanderers	Newcastle
19:55 AEDT	Thurgate 61'	Report		Stadium: McDonald Jones Stadium; Attendance: 3,581; Referee: Alireza Faghani

26 February 2022 16	Newcastle Jets	2–2	Macarthur FC	Newcastle
17:05 AEDT	Mikeltadze 33' (pen.); Li. Rose 79' (o.g.)	Report	Uskok 21'; Oar 60'	Stadium: McDonald Jones Stadium; Attendance: 5,236; Referee: Adam Kersey

5 March 2022 17	Western United	2–1	Newcastle Jets	Ballarat
15:05 AEDT	Lacroix 16', 52'	Report	Thurgate 81'	Stadium: Eureka Stadium; Attendance: 2,674; Referee: Lachlan Keevers

9 March 2022 9	Wellington Phoenix	3–2	Newcastle Jets	Gosford
19:45 AEDT	Sotirio 25' (pen.); Waine 45'; Ball 88'	Report	Penha 42'; Boumal 63'	Stadium: Central Coast Stadium; Attendance: 573; Referee: Ben Abraham

13 March 2022 18	Adelaide United	2–1	Newcastle Jets	Adelaide
19:15 AEDT	Blackwood 3'; Toure 88'	Report	Thurgate 65'	Stadium: Coopers Stadium; Attendance: 6,921; Referee: Shaun Evans

18 March 2022 19	Newcastle Jets	4–0	Wellington Phoenix	Newcastle
18:10 AEST	Boumal 51', 63'; Mikeltadze 67'; Babalj 83'	Report		Stadium: McDonald Jones Stadium; Attendance: 4,353; Referee: Alireza Faghani

25 March 2022 20	Newcastle Jets	2–0	Sydney FC	Newcastle
19:45 AEDT	Goodwin 41', 43'	Report		Stadium: McDonald Jones Stadium; Attendance: 4,424; Referee: Stephen Lucas

30 March 2022 11	Perth Glory	0–0	Newcastle Jets	Perth
18:40 AWST		Report		Stadium: HBF Park; Attendance: 2,577; Referee: Daniel Elder

3 April 2022 21	Brisbane Roar	2–0	Newcastle Jets	Kippa-Ring
16:05 AEST	Hore 83'; Ivanovic 90+3'	Report		Stadium: Moreton Daily Stadium; Attendance: 5,463; Referee: Chris Beath

10 April 2022 23	Newcastle Jets	6–1	Perth Glory	Newcastle
16:05 AEST	Penha 21', 50'; Mikeltadze 31', 37', 78' (pen.); Yuel 81'	Report	Bramwell 69'	Stadium: McDonald Jones Stadium; Attendance: 4,643; Referee: Stephen Lucas

16 April 2022 24	Newcastle Jets	1–2	Melbourne Victory	Newcastle
19:45 AEST	Siatravanis 65'	Report	D'Agostino 6'; Margiotta 90+3'	Stadium: McDonald Jones Stadium; Attendance: 5,649; Referee: Jonathon Barreiro

20 April 2022 22	Western Sydney Wanderers	3–2	Newcastle Jets	Sydney
19:05 AEST	Ugarkovic 6'; Rodwell 18'; Najjarine 21'	Report	Hoffman 67'; Silvera 75'	Stadium: CommBank Stadium; Attendance: 3,767; Referee: Tim Danaskos

23 April 2022 25	Newcastle Jets	2–4	Central Coast Mariners	Newcastle
19:45 AEST	Mauragis 46'; Farrell 50' (o.g.)	Report	Moresche 19'; Cummings 30', 34' (pen.); Kuol 90+1'	Stadium: McDonald Jones Stadium; Attendance: 6,202; Referee: Kurt Ams

1 May 2022 26	Macarthur FC	0–3	Newcastle Jets	Campbelltown
16:05 AEST		Report	Siatravanis 4'; Yuel 66'; Mikeltadze 73'	Stadium: Campbelltown Stadium; Attendance: 3,567; Referee: Adam Kersey

4 May 2022 8	Newcastle Jets	1–1	Western United	Newcastle
19:05 AEST	Elsey 52'	Report	Bayew 27'	Stadium: McDonald Jones Stadium; Attendance: 3,567; Referee: Jonathan Bareiro

7 May 2022 10	Central Coast Mariners	2–0	Newcastle Jets	Gosford
19:45 AEST	Cummings 30'; Nkololo 62'	Report		Stadium: Central Coast Stadium; Attendance: 11,703; Referee: Alireza Faghani

== Statistics ==
=== Appearances and goals ===
Players with no appearances not included in the list.

No.	Pos.	Nat.	Name	A-League		Australia Cup play-off		FFA Cup play-off		Total	
No.	Pos.	Nat.	Name	Apps	Goals	Apps	Goals	Apps	Goals	Apps	Goals
1	GK	(Australia)	Jack Duncan	20	0	0	0	1	0	21	0
2	DF	(New Zealand)	Dane Ingham	18(5)	0	1	0	1	0	25	0
3	DF	(Australia)	Jason Hoffman	22(2)	1	1	0	1	0	26	1
4	DF	(Australia)	Jordan Elsey	25	1	1	1	1	0	27	2
6	DF	(Australia)	Matthew Jurman	21(1)	0	1	0	1	0	24	0
7	MF	(Australia)	Jordan O'Doherty	9(9)	0	0	0	0(1)	0	19	0
8	MF	(Spain)	Mario Arqués	8(6)	0	0	0	0	0	14	0
9	FW	(Georgia (country))	Beka Mikeltadze	24	13	1	0	1	0	26	13
10	MF	(Cameroon)	Olivier Boumal	18(2)	4	0	0	1	0	21	4
11	MF	(Brazil)	Daniel Penha	23	4	1	1	1	1	25	6
13	MF	(Australia)	Brandon Wilson	8(3)	0	1	0	0	0	12	0
14	MF	(Australia)	Mohamed Al-Taay	2(9)	0	0(1)	0	0	0	12	0
15	DF	(Australia)	Dylan Murnane	8(12)	1	0	0	0	0	20	1
16	MF	(Australia)	Kosta Grozos	8(12)	0	1	0	1	0	22	0
17	FW	(South Sudan)	Valentino Yuel	10(11)	6	0(1)	0	0(1)	0	23	6
19	DF	(Australia)	Taylor Regan	7(3)	0	0	0	0	0	10	0
20	GK	(Australia)	Michael Weier	6	0	1	0	0	0	7	0
21	FW	(Greece)	Savvas Siatravanis	12(7)	2	0	0	1	0	20	0
23	FW	(Australia)	Eli Babalj	1(9)	1	0	0	0(1)	0	11	1
25	MF	(Australia)	Samuel Silvera	5(14)	1	1	0	0(1)	0	21	1
26	MF	(Australia)	Archie Goodwin	1(7)	2	0(1)	1	0	0	9	3
27	DF	(Australia)	Lucas Mauragis	4(6)	1	0(1)	0	0	0	11	1
28	MF	(Australia)	Blake Archbold	0(1)	0	0	0	0	0	1	0
32	MF	(Australia)	Angus Thurgate	22(1)	5	1	0	1	0	25	5
44	DF	(Australia)	Riley Warland	4(7)	0	0	0	0(1)	0	12	0

=== Clean sheets ===
As of 12 December 2021

Rank	Name	A-League	FFA Cup	Total
1	(Australia) Jack Duncan	1	0	1
Total		1	0	0

== Club awards ==
=== Newcastle Jets Player of the Month award ===
Awarded monthly to the player that was chosen by supporters voting online.

Month	Player	Ref
November/December	(Georgia (country)) Beka Mikeltadze	
January/February	(Australia) Angus Thurgate	
March	(Brazil) Daniel Penha	

== See also ==
- 2021–22 Newcastle Jets FC (A-League Women) season
