= A-League Men transfers for 2021–22 season =

This is a list of Australian soccer transfers for the 2021–22 A-League Men. Only moves featuring at least one A-League Men club are listed.

Clubs were able to sign players at any time, but many transfers will only officially go through on 1 June because the majority of player contracts finish on 31 May.

== Transfers ==
All players without a flag are Australian. Clubs without a flag are clubs participating in the A-League Men.

=== Pre-season ===
Date	Player	Moving from	Moving to
16 April 2021	Alou Kuol	Central Coast Mariners	(Germany) VfB Stuttgart
17 May 2021	(Mexico) Ulises Dávila	Wellington Phoenix	Macarthur FC
19 May 2021	(New Zealand) Andrew Durante	Western United	Retired
23 May 2021	Max Burgess	Western United	Sydney FC
31 May 2021	(New Zealand) Stefan Marinovic	Wellington Phoenix	(Israel) Hapoel Nof HaGalil
2 June 2021	Mark Milligan	Macarthur FC	Retired
5 June 2021	Mathew Leckie	Unattached	Melbourne City
11 June 2021	Nigel Boogaard	Newcastle Jets	Retired
11 June 2021	(New Zealand) Max Crocombe	Melbourne Victory	Unattached
11 June 2021	(Iraq) Ali Abbas	Newcastle Jets	Unattached
11 June 2021	(Republic of Ireland) Roy O'Donovan	Newcastle Jets	Unattached
11 June 2021	Matthew Millar	Newcastle Jets	Unattached
11 June 2021	Jack Simmons	Newcastle Jets	Unattached
11 June 2021	Luka Prso	Newcastle Jets	(Croatia) Osijek (end of loan)
14 June 2021	(England) Craig Noone	Melbourne City	Macarthur FC
15 June 2021	(England) Gary Hooper	Unattached	Wellington Phoenix
15 June 2021	(England) Macaulay Gillesphey	Brisbane Roar	(England) Plymouth Argyle
15 June 2021	Tete Yengi	Newcastle Jets	Unattached
15 June 2021	Jack Armson	Newcastle Jets	Unattached
16 June 2021	(Germany) Matti Steinmann	Unattached	Brisbane Roar
17 June 2021	(New Zealand) Joe Champness	Brisbane Roar	Newcastle Jets (end of loan)
17 June 2021	(Japan) Riku Danzaki	Brisbane Roar	(Japan) Consadole Sapporo (end of loan)
17 June 2021	Jordan Courtney-Perkins	Brisbane Roar	Unattached
18 June 2021	(Ivory Coast) Adama Traoré	Melbourne Victory	Western Sydney Wanderers
18 June 2021	(Spain) Iker Guarrotxena	Western United	Unattached
18 June 2021	(England) Kaine Sheppard	Western United	Unattached
18 June 2021	Brad Inman	Western United	(India) ATK Mohun Bagan (end of loan)
21 June 2021	Golgol Mebrahtu	Brisbane Roar	Unattached
21 June 2021	Dylan Wenzel-Halls	Brisbane Roar	Western United
21 June 2021	Jack Clisby	Central Coast Mariners	Perth Glory
21 June 2021	Nikola Mileusnic	(Denmark) Randers FC	Brisbane Roar
22 June 2021	Tando Velaphi	Perth Glory	Unattached
22 June 2021	(Germany) Sebastian Langkamp	Perth Glory	Unattached
22 June 2021	Nick Sullivan	Perth Glory	Unattached
22 June 2021	Brandon Wilson	Perth Glory	Unattached
22 June 2021	Joel Chianese	Perth Glory	(India) Hyderabad (end of loan)
23 June 2021	Aaron Calver	Western United	Perth Glory
23 June 2021	Daniel De Silva	Central Coast Mariners	Macarthur FC
23 June 2021	Ryan Strain	Adelaide United	(Israel) Maccabi Haifa
24 June 2021	Yared Abetew	Adelaide United	(Australia) Newcastle Olympic
25 June 2021	Noah James	Western Sydney Wanderers	Newcastle Jets (end of loan)
25 June 2021	Scott McDonald	Western Sydney Wanderers	Unattached
25 June 2021	(Germany) Patrick Ziegler	Western Sydney Wanderers	Unattached
25 June 2021	Kyle Cimenti	Macarthur FC	Unattached
25 June 2021	Ivan Franjic	Macarthur FC	Unattached
25 June 2021	Yianni Nicolaou	Macarthur FC	Unattached
25 June 2021	Milislav Popovic	Macarthur FC	Unattached
25 June 2021	(France) Loïc Puyo	Macarthur FC	Unattached
25 June 2021	Walter Scott	Macarthur FC	Unattached
25 June 2021	Luke DeVere	Wellington Phoenix	Unattached
25 June 2021	(New Zealand) Te Atawhai Hudson-Wihongi	Wellington Phoenix	Unattached
25 June 2021	Charles Lokolingoy	Wellington Phoenix	Unattached
25 June 2021	Liam McGing	Wellington Phoenix	Unattached
25 June 2021	Mirza Muratovic	Wellington Phoenix	Unattached
25 June 2021	(New Zealand) Matthew Ridenton	Wellington Phoenix	Unattached
28 June 2021	Dakota Ochsenham	Adelaide United	Unattached
28 June 2021	Cameron Devlin	Wellington Phoenix	Newcastle Jets
29 June 2021	(Spain) Beñat	Macarthur FC	Retired
29 June 2021	(Spain) Markel Susaeta	Macarthur FC	Retired
30 June 2021	Ramy Najjarine	Newcastle Jets	Western Sydney Wanderers
30 June 2021	Dylan Ryan	Melbourne Victory	(Netherlands) Willem II (end of loan)
30 June 2021	Mitchell Duke	Western Sydney Wanderers	(Saudi Arabia) Al-Taawoun (end of loan)
1 July 2021	Matthew Jurman	Unattached	Newcastle Jets
1 July 2021	Brandon O'Neill	Unattached	Perth Glory
1 July 2021	Daniel Bouman	Central Coast Mariners	Unattached
1 July 2021	Jaden Casella	Central Coast Mariners	Unattached
2 July 2021	(New Zealand) Dane Ingham	Perth Glory	Newcastle Jets
2 July 2021	(Germany) Alexander Baumjohann	Sydney FC	Unattached
2 July 2021	Patrick Flottmann	Sydney FC	Unattached
2 July 2021	Anton Mlinaric	(Croatia) Dinamo Zagreb	Sydney FC (end of loan)
3 July 2021	Ryan McGowan	Sydney FC	Kuwait SC
4 July 2021	Lewis Italiano	Newcastle Jets	Unattached
5 July 2021	Mohamed Al-Taay	Western Sydney Wanderers	Newcastle Jets
6 July 2021	Riley Warland	Perth Glory	Newcastle Jets
6 July 2021	(Scotland) Graham Dorrans	Western Sydney Wanderers	Unattached
6 July 2021	(Japan) Naoki Tsubaki	Melbourne City	(Japan) Yokohama F. Marinos (end of loan)
7 July 2021	(Georgia (country)) Beka Mikeltadze	(Greece) Xanthi	Newcastle Jets
8 July 2021	Jordan Elsey	Adelaide United	Newcastle Jets
9 July 2021	(Benin) Rudy Gestede	Melbourne Victory	Unattached
9 July 2021	(England) Callum McManaman	Melbourne Victory	(England) Tranmere Rovers
10 July 2021	(England) Matt Derbyshire	Macarthur FC	(Cyprus) AEK Larnaca
11 July 2021	(Israel) Tomer Hemed	Wellington Phoenix	Western Sydney Wanderers
11 July 2021	Bruce Kamau	Western Sydney Wanderers	(Greece) OFI
11 July 2021	Tomislav Uskok	Western United	Macarthur FC
14 July 2021	Dylan McGowan	Western Sydney Wanderers	(Scotland) Kilmarnock
14 July 2021	Tomi Juric	Adelaide United	Macarthur FC
14 July 2021	Jason Geria	Perth Glory	Melbourne Victory
15 July 2021	(England) Jacob Butterfield	Melbourne Victory	Unattached
15 July 2021	Joshua Brillante	(Greece) Xanthi	Melbourne Victory
16 July 2021	James Donachie	(India) Goa	Sydney FC
16 July 2021	Jason Davidson	Unattached	Melbourne Victory
17 July 2021	Connor O'Toole	Newcastle Jets	Sydney FC
17 July 2021	(Uruguay) Adrián Luna	Melbourne City	Unattached
18 July 2021	Ben Garuccio	Melbourne City	Western United
18 July 2021	(Kosovo) Besart Berisha	Western United	Unattached
18 July 2021	Rhys Williams	(Saudi Arabia) Al Qadsiah	Western Sydney Wanderers
19 July 2021	Stefan Nigro	Central Coast Mariners	Melbourne Victory
20 July 2021	Matthew Spiranovic	Unattached	Melbourne Victory
21 July 2021	Chris Ikonomidis	Perth Glory	Melbourne Victory
22 July 2021	(Burundi) Elvis Kamsoba	Melbourne Victory	Sydney FC
23 July 2021	(England) Jordon Mutch	Western Sydney Wanderers	Macarthur FC
25 July 2021	Terry Antonis	(South Korea) Suwon Samsung Bluewings	Western Sydney Wanderers
26 July 2021	John Koutroumbis	Newcastle Jets	Western Sydney Wanderers
26 July 2021	(Germany) Nicolai Müller	Western Sydney Wanderers	Central Coast Mariners
26 July 2021	Brendan Hamill	Western United	Melbourne Victory
27 July 2021	(Spain) Rai Marchán	Andorra	Melbourne Victory
28 July 2021	Noah Smith	Adelaide United	Central Coast Mariners
29 July 2021	Nikolai Topor-Stanley	Newcastle Jets	Western United
29 July 2021	(New Zealand) Callan Elliot	(Greece) Xanthi	Wellington Phoenix
30 July 2021	Nicholas Pennington	(Italy) Olbia	Wellington Phoenix
30 July 2021	Nick Ansell	Melbourne Victory	Adelaide United
30 July 2021	(Croatia) Ivan Kelava	(Greece) Xanthi	Melbourne Victory
31 July 2021	Denis Genreau	Macarthur FC	(France) Toulouse
1 August 2021	Nicholas Walsh	Perth Glory	(Australia) Balcatta FC
2 August 2021	(England) Jamie Young	Brisbane Roar	Western United
2 August 2021	George Blackwood	Unattached	Adelaide United
2 August 2021	Noah Botic	(Germany) TSG Hoffenheim	Western United
2 August 2021	Apostolos Stamatelopoulos	Newcastle Jets	(Greece) Rodos
3 August 2021	Michael Marrone	Adelaide United	(Australia) Sturt Lions
5 August 2021	Brad Jones	Unattached	Perth Glory
5 August 2021	Luke Ivanovic	Sydney FC	Brisbane Roar
6 August 2021	Jacob Tratt	Unattached	Adelaide United
6 August 2021	(Argentina) Juan Lescano	(Russia) Yenisey Krasnoyarsk	Brisbane Roar
7 August 2021	(Japan) Masato Kudo	Brisbane Roar	Unattached
8 August 2021	Dimitri Petratos	(Saudi Arabia) Al Wehda	Western Sydney Wanderers (loan)
9 August 2021	(New Zealand) Gianni Stensness	Central Coast Mariners	(Norway) Viking
14 August 2021	Nicholas D'Agostino	Perth Glory	Melbourne Victory
16 August 2021	(Poland) Michał Janota	Central Coast Mariners	(Poland) Podbeskidzie
17 August 2021	Mason Tatafu	Perth Glory	(United States) Hofstra Pride
18 August 2021	(Cameroon) Olivier Boumal	Unattached	Newcastle Jets
19 August 2021	Dylan Murnane	(Finland) HJK Helsinki	Newcastle Jets
19 August 2021	(New Zealand) Joe Champness	Newcastle Jets	(Turkey) Giresunspor
20 August 2021	(Brazil) Daniel Penha	(Brazil) Atlético Mineiro	Newcastle Jets (loan)
20 August 2021	Samuel Silvera	(Portugal) Paços de Ferreira	Newcastle Jets (loan)
20 August 2021	(Japan) Cy Goddard	Unattached	Central Coast Mariners
23 August 2021	(Spain) Isaías	Unattached	Adelaide United
24 August 2021	Jordon Hall	(Australia) Green Gully	Melbourne City
27 August 2021	Neil Kilkenny	Perth Glory	Western United
27 August 2021	(France) Béni Nkololo	Unattached	Central Coast Mariners
27 August 2021	(Spain) Adrián Sardinero	(Greece) OFI	Perth Glory
31 August 2021	Cameron Devlin	Newcastle Jets	(Scotland) Heart of Midlothian
1 September 2021	Antonee Burke-Gilroy	Brisbane Roar	Perth Glory
1 September 2021	Pacifique Niyongabire	Adelaide United	Perth Glory
1 September 2021	(Switzerland) Léo Lacroix	(Switzerland) Sion	Western United
2 September 2021	(Serbia) Stefan Janković	Central Coast Mariners	(Malta) Pembroke Athleta
7 September 2021	(Spain) Víctor Sánchez	Western United	Unattached
8 September 2021	(Greece) Savvas Siatravanis	Unattached	Newcastle Jets
11 September 2021	Brandon Lauton	Melbourne Victory	Unattached
14 September 2021	Jordan Holmes	Unattached	Brisbane Roar
15 September 2021	Kosta Grozos	Western Sydney Wanderers	Newcastle Jets
16 September 2021	Dakota Ochsenham	Unattached	Adelaide United
17 September 2021	Michael Weier	(Australia) Hume City	Newcastle Jets
20 September 2021	(Italy) Manuel Pucciarelli	Unattached	Melbourne City
23 September 2021	Jordan Smylie	Central Coast Mariners	(Australia) Blacktown City
23 September 2021	Adam Pearce	Central Coast Mariners	(Australia) Newcastle Olympic
26 September 2021	(Slovenia) Rene Krhin	Unattached	Western United
27 September 2021	Jez Lofthouse	(Australia) Olympic FC	Brisbane Roar
28 September 2021	(England) Steven Taylor	Wellington Phoenix	Retired
28 September 2021	Henry Hore	(Australia) South Melbourne	Brisbane Roar
1 October 2021	(Portugal) Roderick Miranda	Unattached	Melbourne Victory
1 October 2021	(England) Daniel Sturridge	Unattached	Perth Glory
1 October 2021	(New Zealand) Storm Roux	Melbourne Victory	Central Coast Mariners
2 October 2021	(Spain) Diego Castro	Perth Glory	Unattached
8 October 2021	Yaren Sözer	Unattached	Central Coast Mariners
9 October 2021	Matthew Cahill	Central Coast Mariners	(Australia) APIA Leichhardt
11 October 2021	Izaack Powell	Brisbane Roar	Unattached
12 October 2021	Eli Babalj	Unattached	Newcastle Jets
13 October 2021	(Spain) Mario Arqués	Unattached	Newcastle Jets
13 October 2021	(North Macedonia) Matthew Bozinovski	Melbourne Victory	Wellington Phoenix (loan)
13 October 2021	Al Hassan Toure	Adelaide United	Macarthur FC
15 October 2021	(Japan) Keijiro Ogawa	(Japan) Yokohama FC	Western Sydney Wanderers (loan)
15 October 2021	(Serbia) Aleksandar Prijović	Unattached	Western United
15 October 2021	Mitchell Oxborrow	Unattached	Perth Glory
16 October 2021	Kwame Yeboah	Western Sydney Wanderers	Retired
16 October 2021	Nathan Konstandopoulos	Adelaide United	Unattached
18 October 2021	Luka Prso	(Croatia) Osijek	Wellington Phoenix
18 October 2021	(Spain) Tomás Mejías	(Turkey) Ankaraspor	Western Sydney Wanderers
20 October 2021	(Italy) Francesco Margiotta	Unattached	Melbourne Victory
23 October 2021	Adam Federici	Macarthur FC	Retired
24 October 2021	Nick Olsen	(Kuwait) Khaitan SC	Brisbane Roar
25 October 2021	Anton Mlinaric	Sydney FC	Brisbane Roar(loan)
26 October 2021	(Poland) Filip Kurto	Western United	Macarthur FC
28 October 2021	Jordan Swibel	Sydney FC	Western Sydney Wanderers
30 October 2021	(Brazil) Moresche	Unattached	Central Coast Mariners
1 November 2021	Christian Theoharous	Unattached	Western United
4 November 2021	Jerrad Tyson	(Australia) Green Gully	Melbourne Victory
5 November 2021	(New Zealand) Aidan Munford	Unattached	Brisbane Roar
10 November 2021	(England) Jack Rodwell	Unattached	Western Sydney Wanderers

=== Mid-season ===
Date	Player	Moving from	Moving to
20 November 2021	Liam McGing	Unattached	Sydney FC
29 November 2021	(Jamaica) Adrian Mariappa	Unattached	Macarthur FC
1 December 2021	Dakota Ochsenham	Adelaide United	(Australia) Adelaide City
3 December 2021	Nicholas Sorras	(Australia) Sydney Olympic	Perth Glory (loan)
10 December 2021	Asad Kasumovic	(Australia) Adelaide City	Adelaide United
21 December 2021	(Mexico) Gael Sandoval	(Mexico) Guadalajara	Wellington Phoenix (loan)
24 December 2021	Mustafa Amini	Unattached	Sydney FC
24 December 2021	Nathaniel Atkinson	Melbourne City	(Scotland) Heart of Midlothian
28 December 2021	Kosta Petratos	Newcastle Jets	(Cyprus) Olympias Lympion
29 December 2021	Lachlan Barr	(Australia) Adelaide City	Adelaide United
2 January 2022	Ben Halloran	Adelaide United	(South Korea) FC Seoul
4 January 2022	Jerrad Tyson	Melbourne Victory	Unattached
7 January 2022	(England) Scott Wootton	(England) Morecambe	Wellington Phoenix
8 January 2022	(Cyprus) Antonis Martis	Macarthur FC	(Denmark) Midtjylland (end of loan)
12 January 2022	Lachlan Brook	(England) Brentford	Adelaide United (loan)
14 January 2022	(Japan) Hiroshi Ibusuki	(Japan) Shimizu S-Pulse	Adelaide United
14 January 2022	Apostolos Giannou	Unattached	Macarthur FC
19 January 2022	Taylor Regan	Unattached	Newcastle Jets
19 January 2022	Luka Prso	Wellington Phoenix	Melbourne Victory
19 January 2022	(England) Carl Jenkinson	(England) Nottingham Forest	Melbourne City (loan)
20 January 2022	(New Zealand) Aidan Munford	Brisbane Roar	(Australia) Lions FC
21 January 2022	(Serbia) Darko Stanojević	Unattached	Perth Glory
24 January 2022	(Scotland) Jason Cummings	(Scotland) Dundee	Central Coast Mariners
29 January 2022	Joel King	Sydney FC	(Denmark) OB
1 February 2022	(Japan) Tsubasa Endoh	Unattached	Melbourne City
2 February 2022	Jacob Young	Unattached	Perth Glory
4 February 2022	(Japan) Ryo Wada	(Japan) Sagan Tosu	Brisbane Roar (loan)
5 February 2022	(England) Zach Clough	Unattached	Adelaide United
7 February 2022	Nathan Konstandopoulos	Unattached	Adelaide United
9 February 2022	Ayom Majok	Western United	Unattached
10 February 2022	Noah James	Newcastle Jets	(Australia) Dandenong Thunder (loan)
11 February 2022	Nick Fitzgerald	Unattached	Perth Glory
11 February 2022	(Netherlands) Luciano Narsingh	Unattached	Sydney FC
11 February 2022	Connor Chapman	Unattached	Brisbane Roar
17 February 2022	Tomislav Mrcela	Unattached	Western Sydney Wanderers
27 February 2022	Stefan Mauk	Adelaide United	(Japan) Fagiano Okayama
28 February 2022	Brandon Wilson	Unattached	Newcastle Jets
6 March 2022	Nicholas Sorras	Perth Glory	(Australia) Sydney Olympic (end of loan)
15 March 2022	Aaron Calver	Perth Glory	(South Korea) Gwangju FC
25 March 2022	Nate Cavaliere	(Australia) Broadmeadow Magic	Newcastle Jets (loan)
29 March 2022	Nate Cavaliere	Newcastle Jets	(Australia) Broadmeadow Magic (end of loan)

Player was released to free agency before joining new club
Najjarine returned from loan to his parent club Melbourne City who released him before joining Western Sydney Wanderers
Donachie returned from loan to his parent club Newcastle Jets who released him before joining Sydney FC
