= 2020–21 Newcastle Jets FC season =

2019–20 Newcastle Jets Football Championship

Newcastle Jets
2020–21 season
- Chairman: Martin Lee (to 4 January 2021); Shane Mattiske (from 4 January 2021)
- Manager: Carl Robinson (to 15 October 2020); Craig Deans (interim) (from 16 October 2020 to 10 February 2021); Craig Deans (head coach) (from 10 February 2021)
- Stadium: McDonald Jones Stadium
- A-League: 11th
- FFA Cup: Cancelled
- Top goalscorer: League: Roy O'Donovan (7); All: Roy O'Donovan (7)
- Highest home attendance: 5,374 (8 January 2021 vs. Western Sydney Wanderers
- Lowest home attendance: 2,414 (21 March 2021 vs. Adelaide United
- Average home league attendance: 4,056
Home colours	Away colours	Third colours

The 2020–21 season was Newcastle Jets' 20th season since its establishment in 2000. The club participated in the A-League for the 16th time.

== Players ==
Note: Flags indicate national team as defined under FIFA eligibility rules; some limited exceptions apply. Players may hold more than one non-FIFA nationality.

No.	Pos.	Nation	Player
1	GK	AUS	Lewis Italiano
2	DF	AUS	John Koutroumbis
3	DF	AUS	Jason Hoffman
4	DF	AUS	Nigel Boogaard (Captain)
5	MF	AUS	Ben Kantarovski
7	MF	AUS	Jordan O'Doherty
9	FW	IRL	Roy O'Donovan
11	FW	AUS	Ramy Najjarine (on loan from Melbourne City)
14	MF	IRQ	Ali Abbas
15	FW	AUS	Tete Yengi (Scholarship)
16	DF	AUS	Matthew Millar
17	FW	SSD	Valentino Yuel

No.	Pos.	Nation	Player
18	MF	AUS	Jack Armson (Scholarship)
19	FW	AUS	Kosta Petratos
21	MF	AUS	Luka Prso (on loan from Osijek)
23	GK	AUS	Jack Duncan
24	DF	AUS	Connor O'Toole
25	MF	AUS	Jack Simmons (Scholarship)
26	FW	AUS	Archie Goodwin (Scholarship)
27	DF	AUS	Lucas Mauragis (Scholarship)
28	FW	AUS	Blake Archbold (Scholarship)
32	MF	AUS	Angus Thurgate
33	FW	AUS	Apostolos Stamatelopoulos
44	DF	AUS	Nikolai Topor-Stanley (Vice-captain)

== Transfers ==
=== Transfers in ===
No.	Position	Player	Transferred from	Type/fee	Contract length	Date	Ref
	DF	James Donachie	Melbourne Victory	Free transfer	3 years	5 June 2020	
11	FW	Ramy Najjarine	Melbourne City	Loan	1 year	8 October 2020	
	FW	Joe Champness	Return from retirement		2 years	30 October 2020	
17	FW	Valentino Yuel	Unattached	Free transfer	2 years	14 December 2020	
23	GK	Jack Duncan	Unattached	Free transfer	1 year	21 December 2020	
14	MF	(Iraq) Ali Abbas	Unattached	Free transfer	1 year	30 December 2020	
18	MF	Jack Armson	(Australia) Bonnyrigg White Eagles	Scholarship	1 year	30 December 2020	
15	FW	Tete Yengi	(Australia) Adelaide Comets	Scholarship	1 year	30 December 2020	
16	DF	Matthew Millar	(England) Shrewsbury Town	End of loan	(1 year)	15 January 2021	
21	MF	Luka Prso	(Croatia) Osijek	Loan	6 months	22 January 2021	
33	FW	Apostolos Stamatelopoulos	Unattached	Free transfer	6 months	27 January 2021	
20	MF	(Indonesia) Syahrian Abimanyu	(Malaysia) Johor Darul Ta'zim II	Loan	5 months	5 February 2021	
8	MF	(Malaysia) Liridon Krasniqi	(Malaysia) Johor Darul Ta'zim II	Loan	5 months	5 February 2021	
7	MF	Jordan O'Doherty	Western Sydney Wanderers	Free transfer	2 months (with one year option)	7 May 2021	

=== From youth squad ===
N	Pos.	Nat.	Name	Age	Notes
28	DF	(Australia)	Blake Archbold	19	1 year scholarship contract
26	FW	(Australia)	Archie Goodwin	16	1 year scholarship contract

=== Transfers out ===
No.	Position	Player	Transferred to	Type/fee	Date	Ref
10	MF	Dimitri Petratos	(Saudi Arabia) Al-Wehda	End of contract	11 August 2020	
9	FW	(Panama) Abdiel Arroyo	(Panama) Árabe Unido	End of loan	15 August 2020	
	DF	James Donachie	(India) Goa	Loan	26 September 2020	
16	DF	Matthew Millar	(England) Shrewsbury Town	Loan	3 October 2020	
2	DF	Michael Neill	(Australia) Rockdale City Suns	End of contract	20 October 2020	
11	FW	Nick Fitzgerald	(India) Jamshedpur	Undisclosed	21 October 2020	
	FW	Joe Champness	Brisbane Roar	Loan	30 October 2020	
21	FW	Bernie Ibini	Western Sydney Wanderers	Contract buy-out by player	17 December 2020	
17	MF	(Wales) Joe Ledley	Unattached	End of contract	26 December 2020	
40	GK	Noah James	Western Sydney Wanderers	Loan	30 December 2020	
28	DF	Patrick Langlois	(Australia) Hume City	End of contract	17 February 2021	
13	MF	Maki Petratos	Unattached	Mutual contract termination	1 April 2021	
20	MF	(Indonesia) Syahrian Abimanyu	(Malaysia) Johor Darul Ta'zim II	End of loan	3 May 2021	
6	MF	Steven Ugarkovic	Western Sydney Wanderers	Mutual contract termination	7 May 2021	
8	MF	(Malaysia) Liridon Krasniqi	(Malaysia) Johor Darul Ta'zim II	End of loan	15 May 2021	
22	DF	Lachlan Jackson	Unattached	Mutual contract termination	3 June 2021	

=== Contract extensions ===
No.	Name	Position	Duration	Date	Ref
21	Bernie Ibini	Winger	1 year	18 August 2020	
19	Kosta Petratos	Forward	2 years	24 September 2020	
13	Maki Petratos	Midfielder	2 years	24 September 2020	
4	Nigel Boogaard	Centre-back	1 year	18 December 2020	
40	Noah James	Goalkeeper	3 years	30 December 2020	
32	Angus Thurgate	Midfielder	2 years	11 February 2021	
24	Connor O'Toole	Left-back	2 years	9 March 2021	
27	Lucas Mauragis	Midfielder	2 years	16 March 2021	
23	Jack Duncan	Goalkeeper	3 years	8 April 2021	

== Technical staff ==
Position	Name
Head coach	(Australia) Craig Deans
Assistant coach	(Australia) Karl Dodd
Goalkeeping coach	(Australia) Chris Bowling
Physiotherapist	(Australia) Nathan Renwick

== Pre-season and friendlies ==
13 November 2020	Newcastle Jets (Australia)	0–2	(Australia) Central Coast Mariners	Australia
		Report		Stadium: Central Coast Regional Sporting & Recreation Complex; Attendance: 0 (behind closed doors)

21 November 2020	Edgeworth FC (Australia)	0–5	(Australia) Newcastle Jets	Newcastle, Australia
17:30 AEDT		Report	O'Toole 5', 45'; Najjarine 39', 43'; M. Petratos 56'	Stadium: Jack McLaughlan Oval

26 November 2020	Newcastle Jets (Australia)	3–3	(Australia) Macarthur FC	Maitland, Australia
17:15 AEDT	Yuel 42'; Boogaard 63'; Mauragis 82'	Report	Derbyshire 45+3', 58'; Najjar 65'	Stadium: Maitland Sportsground

5 December 2020	Newcastle Jets (Australia)	3–3	(Australia) Melbourne City	Newcastle, Australia
	Topor-Stanley 16'; Abbas 61'; Armson 89'	Report	Griffiths 21'; Maclaren 24' (pen.); Noone 85'	Stadium: McDonald Jones Stadium; Attendance: 0 (behind closed doors)

12 December 2020	Newcastle Jets (Australia)	1–1	(Australia) Brisbane Roar	Coffs Harbour, Australia
	Topor-Stanley 24'	Report	Parsons 16'	Stadium: C.ex Coffs International Stadium

19 December 2020	Newcastle Jets (Australia)	3–4	(New Zealand) Wellington Phoenix	Newcastle, Australia
	Yuel 53'; Ugarkovic 80' (pen.); Yengi 89'	Report	Muratovic 12'; Rufer 30'; Lewis 45'; Sotirio 57'	Stadium: McDonald Jones Stadium; Attendance: 0 (behind closed doors)

== Competitions ==
=== Overview ===
Competition	First match	Last match	Starting round	Final position	Record							
Competition	First match	Last match	Starting round	Final position	Pld	W	D	L	GF	GA	GD	Win %
A-League	31 December 2020	10 June 2021	Matchday 1	11th	26	5	6	15	24	38	−14	19.23
Total					26	5	6	15	24	38	−14	19.23

Source: Soccerway

=== A-League ===
==== League table ====
Pos	Team	Pld	W	D	L	GF	GA	GD	Pts	Qualification
8	Western Sydney Wanderers	26	9	8	9	45	43	+2	35	
9	Perth Glory	26	9	7	10	44	44	0	34	Qualification for 2021 FFA Cup play-offs (Note: The top 8 teams qualified for the round of 32, while the bottom four teams participated in a playoff round.)
10	Western United	26	8	4	14	30	47	−17	28	Qualification for 2021 FFA Cup play-offs
11	Newcastle Jets	26	5	6	15	24	38	−14	21	Qualification for 2021 FFA Cup play-offs
12	Melbourne Victory	26	5	4	17	31	60	−29	19	Qualification for 2022 AFC Champions League qualifying play-offs and 2021 FFA Cup play-offs (Note: Qualified as the 2021 FFA Cup winners.)

Source: A-Leagues
Rules for classification: 1) Points; 2) Goal difference; 3) Goals scored; 4) Least red cards; 5) Least yellow cards; 6) Toss of a coin in an event of a tie of two clubs.

==== Results summary ====
Overall								Home						Away					
Pld	W	D	L	GF	GA	GD	Pts	W	D	L	GF	GA	GD	W	D	L	GF	GA	GD
26	5	6	15	24	38	−14	21	1	3	9	10	21	−11	4	3	6	14	17	−3

Last updated: 10 February 2021.
Source: ultimatealeague.com

==== Result by round ====
Round	1	2	3	4	5	6	7	8	9	10	11	12	13	14	15	16	17	18	19	20	21	22	23	24	25	26	27
Ground	A	H	A	H	H	B	H	A	A	H	A	A	H	A	H	H	A	H	A	H	H	H	A	A	H	A	A
Result	L	L	L	L	L	✖	W	D	W	L	L	L	L	L	L	L	D	D	L	D	L	L	D	W	D	W	W
Position	10	10	11	12	11	12	8	7	6	10	10	11	11	11	11	11	11	11	11	11	11	11	11	11	11	11	11

Updated to match(es) played on 23 April 2021. Source: ultimatealeague.com
A = Away; H = Home; W = Win; D = Draw; L = Loss

==== Matches ====
The 2020–21 A-League fixtures were announced on 24 November 2020.

31 December 2020 1	Central Coast Mariners	1–0	Newcastle Jets	Gosford
19:05 AEDT	Kuol 43'	Report		Stadium: Central Coast Stadium; Attendance: 5,273; Referee: Stephen Lucas

8 January 2021 2	Newcastle Jets	1–2	Western Sydney Wanderers	Newcastle
19:05 AEDT	Boogaard 72'	Report	Gordon 7'; Russell 57'	Stadium: McDonald Jones Stadium; Attendance: 5,374; Referee: Daniel Elder

17 January 2021 4	Newcastle Jets	1–2	Macarthur FC	Newcastle
16:05 AEDT	Yuel 42'	Report	Puyo 8'; Derbyshire 23'	Stadium: McDonald Jones Stadium; Attendance: 4,455; Referee: Ben Abraham

20 January 2021 5	Newcastle Jets	1–2	Brisbane Roar	Newcastle
19:05 AEDT	Yuel 38'	Report	Danzaki 6'; Wenzel-Halls 61'	Stadium: McDonald Jones Stadium; Attendance: 3,703; Referee: Daniel Elder

24 January 2021 27	Wellington Phoenix	1–2	Newcastle Jets	Wollongong
18:05 AEDT	Dávila 85' (pen.)	Report	Yuel 8'; O'Donovan 51'	Stadium: WIN Stadium; Attendance: 1,742; Referee: Alex King

29 January 2021 23	Western Sydney Wanderers	1–1	Newcastle Jets	Sydney
19:05 AEDT	Ibini 36'	Report	O'Donovan 81' (pen.)	Stadium: Bankwest Stadium; Attendance: 6,896; Referee: Ben Abraham

7 February 2021 7	Newcastle Jets	1–0	Melbourne City	Newcastle
16:05 AEDT	Yuel 40'	Report		Stadium: McDonald Jones Stadium; Attendance: 4,893; Referee: Alex King

14 February 2021 8	Brisbane Roar	0–0	Newcastle Jets	Kippa-Ring
17:10 AEST		Report		Stadium: Dolphin Stadium; Attendance: 7,319; Referee: Ben Abraham

21 February 2021 9	Melbourne Victory	0–1	Newcastle Jets	Melbourne
16:05 AEDT		Report	Thurgate 72'	Stadium: AAMI Park; Attendance: 5,166; Referee: Kurt Ams

28 February 2021 10	Newcastle Jets	0–2	Wellington Phoenix	Newcastle
18:10 AEDT		Report	Ball 22'; Waine 53'	Stadium: McDonald Jones Stadium; Attendance: 4,576; Referee: Jonathan Barreiro

5 March 2021 11	Adelaide United	2–1	Newcastle Jets	Adelaide
18:35 ACST	D'Arrigo 6'; Goodwin 77'	Report	O'Toole 22'	Stadium: Coopers Stadium; Attendance: 7,350; Referee: Stephen Lucas

13 March 2021 12	Sydney FC	2–1	Newcastle Jets	Kogarah
17:05 AEDT	Ninković 64'; Wilkinson 80'	Report	Prso 21'	Stadium: Netstrata Jubilee Stadium; Attendance: 8,920; Referee: Ben Abraham

21 March 2021 13	Newcastle Jets	1–4	Adelaide United	Newcastle
18:40 AEDT	Stamatelopoulos 69'	Report	Yengi 5'; Mauk 11'; Halloran 40'; Goodwin 43' (pen.)	Stadium: McDonald Jones Stadium; Attendance: 2,414; Referee: Jonathan Barreiro

27 March 2021 14	Perth Glory	2–1	Newcastle Jets	Perth
19:20 AWST	Bramwell 17'; Lachman 24'	Report	O'Donovan 59'	Stadium: HBF Park; Attendance: 5,715; Referee: Daniel Elder

5 April 2021 15	Newcastle Jets	0–1	Western United	Newcastle
17:00 AEST		Report	Wales 1'	Stadium: McDonald Jones Stadium; Attendance: 4,301; Referee: Ben Abraham

10 April 2021 16	Newcastle Jets	1–2	Melbourne Victory	Newcastle
15:05 AEST	Stamatelopoulos 18'	Report	Ryan 48'; Brooks 79'	Stadium: McDonald Jones Stadium; Attendance: 3,860; Referee: Adam Fielding

13 April 2021 18	Newcastle Jets	1–1	Perth Glory	Coffs Harbour, NSW
19:05 AEST	O'Donovan 67' (pen.)	Report	Chianese 61'	Stadium: C.ex Coffs International Stadium; Attendance: 2,967; Referee: Shaun Evans

18 April 2021 17	Macarthur FC	2–2	Newcastle Jets	Campbelltown
18:10 AEST	M'Mombwa 36'; Puyo 45+2'	Report	O'Donovan 27' (pen.); Ugarkovic 57'	Stadium: Campbelltown Stadium; Attendance: 2,854; Referee: Lachlan Keevers

26 April 2021 19	Western United	2–0	Newcastle Jets	Melbourne
19:05 AEST	Topor-Stanley 12' (o.g.); Pierias 69'	Report		Stadium: AAMI Park; Attendance: 990; Referee: Kurt Ams

29 April 2021 3	Melbourne City	3–1	Newcastle Jets	Melbourne
19:05 AEST	Koutroumbis 32' (o.g.); Jamieson 59'; Maclaren 69'	Report	Ugarkovic 87'	Stadium: AAMI Park; Attendance: 4,314; Referee: Stephen Lucas

8 May 2021 20	Newcastle Jets	1–1	Sydney FC	Newcastle
17:05 AEST	O'Donovan 59' (pen.)	Report	Boogaard 76' (o.g.)	Stadium: McDonald Jones Stadium; Attendance: 4,404; Referee: Alex King

15 May 2021 21	Newcastle Jets	0–1	Central Coast Mariners	Newcastle
19:10 AEST		Report	Simon 54' (pen.)	Stadium: McDonald Jones Stadium; Attendance: 5,080; Referee: Jonathan Barreiro

21 May 2021 22	Newcastle Jets	1–2	Brisbane Roar	Newcastle
19:05 AEST	O'Shea 61' (o.g.)	Report	Danzaki 34'; O'Shea 73'	Stadium: McDonald Jones Stadium; Attendance: 2,642; Referee: Adam Kersey

1 June 2021 24	Central Coast Mariners	0–2	Newcastle Jets	Gosford
19:05 AEST		Report	O'Donovan 27'; Mauragis 33'	Stadium: Central Coast Stadium; Attendance: 4,973; Referee: Stephen Lucas

5 June 2021 25	Newcastle Jets	1–1	Perth Glory	Newcastle
19:10 AEST	Aspropotamitis 70' (o.g.)	Report	Fornaroli 21'	Stadium: McDonald Jones Stadium; Attendance: 4,065; Referee: Adam Fielding

10 June 2021 26	Melbourne City	1–2	Newcastle Jets	Sydney
19:05 AEST	Colakovski 9'	Report	Goodwin 23'; Stamatelopoulos 89'	Stadium: Jubilee Stadium; Attendance: 0 (No spectators permitted); Referee: Chris Beath

== Statistics ==
=== Appearances and goals ===
Includes all competitions. Players with no appearances not included in the list.

No.	Pos	Nat	Player	Total		A-League	
No.	Pos	Nat	Player	Apps	Goals	Apps	Goals
1	GK	(Australia) AUS	Lewis Italiano	10	0	10	0
2	DF	(Australia) AUS	John Koutroumbis	16	0	14+2	0
3	DF	(Australia) AUS	Jason Hoffman	18	0	14+4	0
4	DF	(Australia) AUS	Nigel Boogaard	18	1	18	1
7	MF	(Australia) AUS	Jordan O'Doherty	5	0	5	0
9	FW	(Republic of Ireland) IRL	Roy O'Donovan	25	7	25	7
11	FW	(Australia) AUS	Ramy Najjarine	15	0	12+3	0
12	DF	(Australia) AUS	Lucas Mauragis	13	1	4+9	1
14	MF	(Iraq) IRQ	Ali Abbas	18	0	5+13	0
15	FW	(Australia) AUS	Tete Yengi	9	0	0+9	0
16	DF	(Australia) AUS	Matthew Millar	18	0	17+1	0
17	FW	(South Sudan) SSD	Valentino Yuel	24	4	17+7	4
19	FW	(Australia) AUS	Kosta Petratos	11	0	3+8	0
21	MF	(Australia) AUS	Luka Prso	17	1	14+3	1
23	GK	(Australia) AUS	Jack Duncan	16	0	16	0
24	DF	(Australia) AUS	Connor O'Toole	22	1	22	1
26	FW	(Australia) AUS	Archie Goodwin	8	1	3+5	1
28	DF	(Australia) AUS	Blake Archbold	6	0	0+6	0
32	MF	(Australia) AUS	Angus Thurgate	26	1	25+1	1
33	FW	(Australia) AUS	Apostolos Stamatelopoulos	12	3	9+3	3
44	DF	(Australia) AUS	Nikolai Topor-Stanley	26	0	26	0
Player(s) transferred out but featured this season
6	MF	(Australia) AUS	Steven Ugarkovic	17	2	16+1	2
8	MF	(Malaysia) MAS	Liridon Krasniqi	9	0	0+9	0
13	FW	(Australia) AUS	Maki Petratos	4	0	0+4	0
20	MF	(Indonesia) IDN	Syahrian Abimanyu	3	0	0+3	0
22	DF	(Australia) AUS	Lachlan Jackson	13	0	11+2	0

- Source: Soccerway

=== Disciplinary record ===
Includes all competitions. The list is sorted by squad number when total cards are equal. Players with no cards not included in the list.

No.	Pos	Nat	Player	Total			A-League		
No.	Pos	Nat	Player	Yellow card	Second yellow card	Red card	Yellow card	Second yellow card	Red card
4	DF	(Australia) AUS	Nigel Boogaard	7	0	0	7	0	0
9	FW	(Republic of Ireland) IRL	Roy O'Donovan	6	0	0	6	0	0
16	DF	(Australia) AUS	Matthew Millar	5	0	0	5	0	0
8	MF	(Malaysia) MAS	Liridon Krasniqi	4	0	0	4	0	0
32	MF	(Australia) AUS	Angus Thurgate	4	0	0	4	0	0
44	DF	(Australia) AUS	Nikolai Topor-Stanley	4	0	0	4	0	0
7	MF	(Australia) AUS	Jordan O'Doherty	3	0	0	3	0	0
12	DF	(Australia) AUS	Lucas Mauragis	3	0	0	3	0	0
14	MF	(Iraq) IRQ	Ali Abbas	3	0	0	3	0	0
17	FW	(South Sudan) SSD	Valentino Yuel	3	0	0	3	0	0
21	MF	(Australia) AUS	Luka Prso	3	0	0	3	0	0
3	DF	(Australia) AUS	Jason Hoffman	2	0	0	2	0	0
6	MF	(Australia) AUS	Steven Ugarkovic	2	0	0	2	0	0
24	DF	(Australia) AUS	Connor O'Toole	2	0	0	2	0	0
33	FW	(Australia) AUS	Apostolos Stamatelopoulos	2	0	0	2	0	0
2	DF	(Australia) AUS	John Koutroumbis	1	0	0	1	0	0
11	FW	(Australia) AUS	Ramy Najjarine	1	0	0	1	0	0
19	FW	(Australia) AUS	Kosta Petratos	1	0	0	1	0	0
20	MF	(Indonesia) IDN	Syahrian Abimanyu	1	0	0	1	0	0
22	DF	(Australia) AUS	Lachlan Jackson	1	0	0	1	0	0

- Source: Soccerway
- (yellow card) = Number of bookings; (second yellow card) = Number of sending offs after a second yellow card; (red card) = Number of sending offs by a direct red card.
