= 2019–20 Newcastle Jets FC season =

2019–20 Newcastle Jets Football Championship

Newcastle Jets
2019–20 season
- Chairman: Martin Lee
- Manager: Ernie Merrick (to 6 January 2020); Craig Deans & Qiang Li (caretakers) (from 6 January 2020 to 6 February 2020); Carl Robinson (from 6 February 2020)
- Stadium: McDonald Jones Stadium
- A-League: 8th
- FFA Cup: Quarter-finals
- Top goalscorer: League: Dimitri Petratos (5); All: Dimitri Petratos (7)
- Highest home attendance: 9,154 vs Western Sydney Wanderers (30 November 2019)
- Lowest home attendance: 2,570 vs Western United (2 August 2020)
- Average home league attendance: 6,949
Home colours	Away colours	Third colours

The 2019–20 season was Newcastle Jets' 19th season since its establishment in 2000. The club participated in the A-League for the 15th time and FFA Cup for the sixth time.

On 24 March 2020, the FFA announced that the 2019–20 A-League season would be postponed until further notice due to the COVID-19 pandemic in Australia and New Zealand, and subsequently extended indefinitely. The season resumed on 17 July 2020.

== Players ==
Note: Flags indicate national team as defined under FIFA eligibility rules; some limited exceptions apply. Players may hold more than one non-FIFA nationality.

No.	Pos.	Nation	Player
2	DF	AUS	Michael Neill
3	FW	AUS	Jason Hoffman
4	DF	AUS	Nigel Boogaard (Captain)
5	MF	AUS	Ben Kantarovski
6	MF	AUS	Steven Ugarkovic
7	FW	IRL	Roy O'Donovan
9	FW	PAN	Abdiel Arroyo (on loan from Árabe Unido)
10	MF	AUS	Dimitri Petratos
11	FW	AUS	Nick Fitzgerald
12	FW	AUS	Lucas Mauragis (Scholarship)
16	DF	AUS	Matthew Millar
17	MF	WAL	Joe Ledley

No.	Pos.	Nation	Player
18	DF	AUS	John Koutroumbis
19	FW	AUS	Kosta Petratos
20	GK	AUS	Lewis Italiano
21	FW	AUS	Bernie Ibini
22	DF	AUS	Lachlan Jackson
25	MF	AUS	Jack Simmons (Scholarship)
28	DF	AUS	Patrick Langlois
29	DF	AUS	Connor O'Toole
31	FW	AUS	Maki Petratos (Scholarship)
32	MF	AUS	Angus Thurgate
40	GK	AUS	Noah James (Scholarship)
44	DF	AUS	Nikolai Topor-Stanley (Vice-captain)

== Transfers ==
=== Transfers in ===
No.	Position	Player	Transferred from	Type/fee	Contract length	Date	Ref
16	DF	Matthew Millar	Central Coast Mariners	Free transfer	2 years	1 February 2019	
11	FW	Nick Fitzgerald	Western Sydney Wanderers	Free transfer	2 years	18 June 2019	
9	FW	(Panama) Abdiel Arroyo	(Panama) Árabe Unido	Loan	1 year	24 June 2019	
8	MF	(Republic of Ireland) Wes Hoolahan	Unattached	Free transfer	1 year	9 August 2019	
2	DF	(Northern Ireland) Bobby Burns	(Scotland) Heart of Midlothian	Loan	1 year	18 September 2019	
29	DF	Connor O'Toole	Brisbane Roar	Free transfer	1.5 years	27 January 2020	
7	FW	(Republic of Ireland) Roy O'Donovan	Brisbane Roar	Free transfer	1.5 years	31 January 2020	
21	FW	Bernie Ibini	Unattached	Free transfer	0.5 years	24 February 2020	
17	MF	(Wales) Joe Ledley	Unattached	Free transfer	0.5 years	25 February 2020	
2	DF	Michael Neill	(Australia) Rockdale City Suns	Free transfer	1 month	20 July 2020	

=== From youth squad ===
N	Pos.	Nat.	Name	Age	Notes
31	FW	(Australia)	Maki Petratos	18	scholarship contract
12	FW	(Australia)	Lucas Mauragis	18	1 year scholarship contract

=== Transfers out ===
No.	Position	Player	Transferred to	Type/fee	Date	Ref
10	MF	(Venezuela) Ronald Vargas	Unattached	Free transfer	24 April 2019	
8	FW	(Brazil) Jair	Unattached	End of contract	24 April 2019	
16	MF	Nick Cowburn	Unattached	End of contract	24 April 2019	
13	FW	(New Zealand) Kwabena Appiah	Unattached	End of contract	24 April 2019	
29	DF	Jake Adelson	Unattached	End of contract	24 April 2019	
17	DF	(North Macedonia) Daniel Georgievski	Western Sydney Wanderers	Free transfer	2 May 2019	
9	FW	(Republic of Ireland) Roy O'Donovan	Unattached	Free transfer	6 May 2019	
13	DF	Ivan Vujica	Western United	Mutual contract termination	21 June 2019	
24	FW	Joe Champness	Retired	Mutual contract termination (Note: Champness signed a contract with Newcastle Jets that if he returns to soccer in the next three years, he will return to Newcastle Jets.)	14 August 2019	
23	MF	(New Zealand) Matthew Ridenton	Unattached	Mutual contract termination	25 February 2020	
2	DF	(Northern Ireland) Bobby Burns	(Scotland) Heart of Midlothian	End of loan	5 April 2020	
14	FW	(England) Kaine Sheppard	Unattached	End of contract	18 June 2020	
1	GK	(New Zealand) Glen Moss	Retired		18 June 2020	
8	MF	(Republic of Ireland) Wes Hoolahan	Unattached	End of contract	26 June 2020	

=== Contract extensions ===
No.	Name	Position	Duration	Date	Ref
28	Patrick Langlois	Defender	1 year	1 May 2019	
2	Jason Hoffman	Forward	2 years	5 December 2019	
5	Ben Kantarovski	Defender	2 years	19 December 2019	
20	Lewis Italiano	Goalkeeper	2 years	14 April 2020	

== Technical staff ==
Position	Name
Head coach	(Wales) Carl Robinson
Assistant coach	(Scotland) Kenny Miller
Assistant coach	(England) Darren Bazeley
Goalkeeping coach	(Australia) Chris Bowling
Physiotherapist	(Australia) Nathan Renwick

Newcastle Jets started the season with Ernie Merrick as their head coach. Following bad results and sitting bottom of the table, Merrick was sacked in January 2020 and Newcastle Jets' W-League coach Craig Deans together with Qiang Li were appointed as caretaker coaches. A month later, Jets appointed Welshman Carl Robinson as the head coach, signing him on a 3.5 year contract. A week after his appointment, Robinson added Kenny Miller to the coaching staff. In June, Darren Bazeley was added to the coaching staff.

== Pre-season and friendlies ==
27 July 2019	Edgeworth FC (Australia)	0–1	(Australia) Newcastle Jets	Newcastle, Australia
14:30 AEST		Report	D. Petratos 27'	Stadium: Jack McLaughlan Oval

31 July 2019	Western Sydney Wanderers (Australia)	2–2	(Australia) Newcastle Jets	Sydney, Australia
	Kamau 12'; Georgievski 35'	Report	Hoffman; Thurgate	Stadium: Valentine Sports Park; Attendance: 0 (behind closed doors)

15 August 2019	Hamilton Olympic (Australia)	0–2	(Australia) Newcastle Jets	Newcastle, Australia
19:00 AEST		Report	Koutroumbis 25'; Arroyo 27'	Stadium: Darling Street Oval

1 September 2019 Surf City Cup	Brisbane Roar (Australia)	3–1	(Australia) Newcastle Jets	Gold Coast, Australia
16:15 AEST	Muratovic 16'; Inman 39', 81'	Report	Fitzgerald 46'	Stadium: Croatian Sports Centre

3 September 2019 Surf City Cup	Perth Glory (Australia)	1–1 (3–4 p)	(Australia) Newcastle Jets	Gold Coast, Australia
18:30 AEST	Kilkenny 44' (pen.)	Report	Kantarovski 11'	Stadium: Croatian Sports Centre
	Penalties
	(penalty missed) Juande; (penalty scored) Brimmer; (penalty scored) G. Popovic; (penalty scored) K. Popovic; (penalty missed) Franjic		(penalty scored) Ugarkovic; (penalty scored) Koutroumbis; (penalty missed) D. Petratos; (penalty scored) M. Petratos; (penalty scored) K. Petratos

21 September 2019	Newcastle Jets (Australia)	0–0	(Australia) Sydney FC	Dubbo, Australia
15:00 AEST		Report		Stadium: Apex Oval

28 September 2019	Newcastle Jets (Australia)	Cancelled	(Australia) Central Coast Mariners	Maitland, Australia
		Cancellation		Stadium: Maitland Sportsground

5 October 2019	Newcastle Jets (Australia)	10–2	(Australia) Young Socceroos	Newcastle, Australia
	Hoffman 2', 7', 14', 26', 33'; Topor-Stanley 4'; Fitzgerald 35', 55'; D. Petratos 45'; Ridenton 57'	Report	Ruiz-Diaz 40', 43'	Stadium: McDonald Jones Stadium; Attendance: 0 (behind closed doors)

13 January 2020	Newcastle Jets (Australia)	2–3	(China) Shanghai SIPG	Newcastle, Australia
		Report		Stadium: McDonald Jones Stadium; Attendance: 0 (behind closed doors)

15 July 2020	Newcastle Jets (Australia)	0–0	(Australia) Western Sydney Wanderers	Lisarow, Australia
		Report		Stadium: Pluim Park

== Competitions ==
Win Draw Loss

=== Overview ===
Competition	First match	Last match	Starting round	Final position	Record							
Competition	First match	Last match	Starting round	Final position	Pld	W	D	L	GF	GA	GD	Win %
A-League	19 October 2019	13 August 2020	Matchday 1	8th	26	9	7	10	32	40	−8	34.62
FFA Cup	7 August 2019	17 September 2019	Round of 32	Quarter-finals	3	2	0	1	8	4	+4	66.67
Total					29	11	7	11	40	44	−4	37.93

Source: Soccerway

=== FFA Cup ===
7 August 2019 Round of 32	Melbourne Victory (Victoria (state))	2–3 (a.e.t.)	(New South Wales) Newcastle Jets	Melbourne
19:30	Nabbout 45+1', 61'	Report	Koutroumbis 74'; D. Petratos 81'; Langlois 113'	Stadium: AAMI Park; Attendance: 4,045; Referee: Shaun Evans

21 August 2019 Round of 16	Edgeworth FC (New South Wales)	1–5	(New South Wales) Newcastle Jets	Newcastle
19:30	McBreen 16'	Report	Arroyo 9'; Hoolahan 38'; D. Petratos 40' (pen.), 77'; Fitzgerald 61'	Stadium: Jack McLaughlan Oval; Attendance: 4,297; Referee: Ben Abraham

17 September 2019 Quarter-final	Adelaide United (South Australia)	1–0	(New South Wales) Newcastle Jets	Adelaide
19:00 ACST	Toure 42'	Report		Stadium: Coopers Stadium; Attendance: 4,807; Referee: Daniel Elder

=== A-League ===
==== League table ====
Pos	Team	Pld	W	D	L	GF	GA	GD	Pts	Qualification
1	Sydney FC (C)	26	16	5	5	49	25	+24	53	Qualification for 2021 AFC Champions League group stage and Finals series (Note: All Australian teams withdrew from the 2021 AFC Champions League on 4 June 2021.) (Note: The top two teams enter the Finals series at the semi-finals, while the teams ranked third to sixth enter the Finals series at the elimination-finals.)
2	Melbourne City	26	14	5	7	49	37	+12	47	Qualification for 2021 AFC Champions League qualifying play-offs and Finals series
3	Wellington Phoenix (Note: Wellington Phoenix cannot qualify for the 2021 AFC Champions League as they are not recognised as an AFC club.)	26	12	5	9	38	33	+5	41	Qualification for Finals series
4	Brisbane Roar	26	11	7	8	29	28	+1	40	Qualification for 2021 AFC Champions League qualifying play-offs and Finals series
5	Western United	26	12	3	11	46	37	+9	39	Qualification for Finals series
6	Perth Glory	26	10	7	9	43	36	+7	37	Qualification for Finals series
7	Adelaide United	26	11	3	12	44	49	−5	36	
8	Newcastle Jets	26	9	7	10	32	40	−8	34	
9	Western Sydney Wanderers	26	9	6	11	35	40	−5	33	
10	Melbourne Victory	26	6	5	15	33	44	−11	23	
11	Central Coast Mariners	26	5	3	18	26	55	−29	18	

Source: A-Leagues
Rules for classification: 1) points; 2) goal difference; 3) number of goals scored.
(C) Champions

==== Results summary ====
Overall								Home						Away					
Pld	W	D	L	GF	GA	GD	Pts	W	D	L	GF	GA	GD	W	D	L	GF	GA	GD
26	9	7	10	32	40	−8	34	6	4	3	19	16	+3	3	3	7	13	24	−11

Last updated: 15 December 2019.
Source: ultimatealeague.com

==== Results by round ====
Round	1	2	3	4	5	6	7	8	9	10	11	12	13	14	15	16	17	18	19	20	21	22	23	27	26	28	25	29	24
Ground	B	A	H	A	H	A	B	H	A	H	A	H	A	H	A	A	H	H	A	H	H	B	A	A	H	N	N	N	N
Result	X	D	L	L	D	W	X	W	L	L	L	D	L	L	L	L	D	W	D	D	W	X	W	L	W	W	D	W	W
Position	8	6	8	10	10	9	9	7	8	10	11	11	11	11	11	11	11	11	10	10	10	10	9	9	9	8	7	7	8
Points	0	1	1	1	2	5	5	8	8	8	8	9	9	9	9	9	10	13	14	15	18	18	21	21	24	27	28	31	34

Source: worldfootball.net
A = Away; H = Home; N = Neutral; B = Bye; W = Win; D = Draw; L = Loss; X = Bye

==== Matches ====
19 October 2019 2	Central Coast Mariners	1–1	Newcastle Jets	Gosford
19:30 AEDT	Đurić 4'	Report	D. Petratos 56' (pen.)	Stadium: Central Coast Stadium; Attendance: 8,910; Referee: Daniel Elder

26 October 2019 3	Newcastle Jets	1–2	Adelaide United	Newcastle
17:00 AEDT	Arroyo 37'	Report	McGree 49', 61'	Stadium: McDonald Jones Stadium; Attendance: 8,899; Referee: Stephen Lucas

1 November 2019 4	Sydney FC	4–1	Newcastle Jets	Sydney
17:00 AEDT	Ninković 6'; Le Fondre 42'; Koutroumbis 51' (o.g.); Barbarouses 65'	Report	Millar 9'	Stadium: Leichhardt Oval; Attendance: 10,511; Referee: Shaun Evans

9 November 2019 5	Newcastle Jets	1–1	Perth Glory	Newcastle
17:00 AEDT	Hoffman 31'	Report	Castro 86'	Stadium: McDonald Jones Stadium; Attendance: 8,038; Referee: Jonathan Barreiro

16 November 2019 6	Western United	0–1	Newcastle Jets	Geelong
19:30 AEDT		Report	Thurgate 36'	Stadium: GMHBA Stadium; Attendance: 5,688; Referee: Alireza Faghani

30 November 2019 8	Newcastle Jets	2–0	Western Sydney Wanderers	Newcastle
19:30 AEDT	Thurgate 78'; D. Petratos 86'	Report		Stadium: McDonald Jones Stadium; Attendance: 9,154; Referee: Kurt Ams

8 December 2019 9	Adelaide United	2–1	Newcastle Jets	Adelaide
17:30 ACDT	Blackwood 30'; Troisi 83'	Report	Millar 48'	Stadium: Coopers Stadium; Attendance: 6,074; Referee: Chris Beath

15 December 2019 10	Newcastle Jets	0–4	Melbourne City	Newcastle
18:30 AEDT		Report	Luna 3', 21'; Cabrera 47'; Maclaren 59'	Stadium: McDonald Jones Stadium; Referee: Alireza Faghani

21 December 2019 11	Perth Glory	6–2	Newcastle Jets	Perth
16:30 AWST	Castro 15', 83'; Kilkenny 33' (pen.); Chianese 46'; Fornaroli 58', 70'	Report	Topor-Stanley 26'; Ugarkovic 51'	Stadium: HBF Park; Attendance: 6,585; Referee: Adam Kersey

28 December 2019 12	Newcastle Jets	1–1	Brisbane Roar	Newcastle
19:30 AEDT	D. Petratos 32'	Report	Inman 87'	Stadium: McDonald Jones Stadium; Attendance: 7,449; Referee: Alireza Faghani

5 January 2020 13	Melbourne Victory	4–0	Newcastle Jets	Melbourne
18:30 AEDT	Kruse 9'; Basha 61'; Nabbout 64'; Millar 86' (o.g.)	Report		Stadium: AAMI Park; Attendance: 14,582; Referee: Daniel Elder

10 January 2020 14	Newcastle Jets	1–2	Sydney FC	Newcastle
19:30 AEDT	Ugarkovic 21'	Report	Le Fondre 14'; Barbarouses 36'	Stadium: McDonald Jones Stadium; Attendance: 8,047; Referee: Stephen Lucas

18 January 2020 15	Melbourne City	2–0	Newcastle Jets	Melbourne
19:30 AEDT	Noone 8'; Maclaren 63' (pen.)	Report		Stadium: AAMI Park; Attendance: 6,857; Referee: Kate Jacewicz

24 January 2020 16	Wellington Phoenix	2–1	Newcastle Jets	Wellington
19:15 NZDT	Sotirio 53'; Dávila 69'	Report	Arroyo 66'	Stadium: Westpac Stadium; Attendance: 8,503; Referee: Ben Abraham

1 February 2020 17	Newcastle Jets	0–0	Western United	Newcastle
17:00 AEDT		Report		Stadium: McDonald Jones Stadium; Attendance: 5,458; Referee: Jonathan Barreiro

9 February 2020 18	Newcastle Jets	4–3	Central Coast Mariners	Newcastle
16:00 AEDT	D. Petratos 15', 52'; Topor-Stanley 25'; Kim 55'	Report	Tongyik 45'; Clisby 49'; Harold 86'	Stadium: McDonald Jones Stadium; Attendance: 4,151; Referee: Kurt Ams

15 February 2020 19	Western Sydney Wanderers	1–1	Newcastle Jets	Sydney
19:30 AEDT	Duke 5' (pen.)	Report	Millar 74'	Stadium: Bankwest Stadium; Attendance: 9,864; Referee: Shaun Evans

22 February 2020 20	Newcastle Jets	1–1	Melbourne Victory	Newcastle
17:00 AEDT	O'Donovan 25'	Report	Toivonen 49'	Stadium: McDonald Jones Stadium; Attendance: 7,115; Referee: Alireza Faghani

29 February 2020 21	Newcastle Jets	2–1	Perth Glory	Newcastle
17:00 AEDT	Topor-Stanley 12'; O'Donovan 74'	Report	Kilkenny 29' (pen.)	Stadium: McDonald Jones Stadium; Attendance: 7,420; Referee: Adam Fielding

15 March 2020 23	Adelaide United	0–3	Newcastle Jets	Adelaide
17:30 ACDT		Report	O'Donovan 41'; Millar 51'; Ugarkovic 54'	Stadium: Coopers Stadium; Attendance: 4,286; Referee: Jonathan Barreiro

20 March 2020 27	Brisbane Roar	1–0	Newcastle Jets	Gold Coast
19:30 AEST	McDonald 16'	Report		Stadium: Cbus Super Stadium; Attendance: 0 (behind closed doors); Referee: Adam Kersey

23 March 2020 26	Newcastle Jets	2–1	Melbourne City	Newcastle
19:30 AEDT	Fitzgerald 45'; Ugarkovic 78'	Report	Berenguer 70'	Stadium: McDonald Jones Stadium; Attendance: 0 (behind closed doors); Referee: Ben Abraham

21 July 2020 28	Sydney FC	1–2	Newcastle Jets	Sydney
19:30 AEDT	Caceres 25'	Report	Fitzgerald 58'; Petratos 90'	Stadium: Netstrata Jubilee Oval; Attendance: 1,186; Referee: Chris Beath

24 July 2020 25	Central Coast Mariners	0–0	Newcastle Jets	Gosford
19:30 AEDT		Report		Stadium: Central Coast Stadium; Attendance: 2,373; Referee: Ben Abraham

2 August 2020 29	Newcastle Jets	1–0	Western United	Newcastle
19:30 AEDT	O'Donovan 29'	Report		Stadium: McDonald Jones Stadium; Attendance: 2,570; Referee: Alex King

13 August 2020 24	Newcastle Jets	3–0	Wellington Phoenix	Sydney
19:30 AEDT	Fitzgerald 45'; Ibini 76'; Hoffman 79'	Report		Stadium: Netstrata Jubilee Oval; Attendance: 0 Referee: Alireza Faghani

== Statistics ==
=== Appearances and goals ===
Includes all competitions. Players with no appearances not included in the list.

No.	Pos	Nat	Player	Total		A-League		FFA Cup	
No.	Pos	Nat	Player	Apps	Goals	Apps	Goals	Apps	Goals
3	DF	(Australia) AUS	Jason Hoffman	27	2	17+7	2	3	0
4	DF	(Australia) AUS	Nigel Boogaard	16	0	16	0	0	0
5	MF	(Australia) AUS	Ben Kantarovski	16	0	12+4	0	0	0
6	MF	(Australia) AUS	Steven Ugarkovic	29	4	26	4	3	0
7	FW	(Republic of Ireland) IRL	Roy O'Donovan	11	4	10+1	4	0	0
9	FW	(Panama) PAN	Abdiel Arroyo	20	3	14+3	2	2+1	1
10	FW	(Australia) AUS	Dimitri Petratos	29	8	23+3	5	3	3
11	FW	(Australia) AUS	Nick Fitzgerald	23	4	14+6	3	3	1
12	DF	(Australia) AUS	Lucas Mauragis	2	0	0+2	0	0	0
16	DF	(Australia) AUS	Matthew Millar	27	4	24	4	3	0
17	MF	(Wales) WAL	Joe Ledley	6	0	1+5	0	0	0
18	DF	(Australia) AUS	John Koutroumbis	28	1	20+5	0	3	1
19	FW	(Australia) AUS	Kosta Petratos	10	1	0+9	1	0+1	0
20	GK	(Australia) AUS	Lewis Italiano	17	0	13+1	0	3	0
21	FW	(Australia) AUS	Bernie Ibini-Isei	6	1	3+3	1	0	0
22	FW	(Australia) AUS	Lachlan Jackson	12	0	11	0	1	0
25	MF	(Australia) AUS	Jack Simmons	1	0	0	0	0+1	0
28	MF	(Australia) AUS	Patrick Langlois	9	1	3+3	0	2+1	1
29	DF	(Australia) AUS	Connor O'Toole	5	0	5	0	0	0
31	FW	(Australia) AUS	Maki Petratos	3	0	0+3	0	0	0
32	FW	(Australia) AUS	Angus Thurgate	28	2	16+9	2	1+2	0
40	FW	(Australia) AUS	Noah James	1	0	1	0	0	0
44	DF	(Australia) AUS	Nikolai Topor-Stanley	28	3	26	3	1+1	0
Player(s) transferred out but featured this season
1	GK	(New Zealand) NZL	Glen Moss	14	0	12+1	0	0+1	0
2	DF	(Northern Ireland) NIR	Bobby Burns	16	0	12+4	0	0	0
8	MF	(Republic of Ireland) IRL	Wes Hoolahan	7	1	2+3	0	2	1
14	FW	(England) ENG	Kaine Sheppard	8	0	0+6	0	1+1	0
23	MF	(New Zealand) NZL	Matthew Ridenton	12	0	5+4	0	2+1	0

=== Disciplinary record ===
Includes all competitions. The list is sorted by squad number when total cards are equal. Players with no cards not included in the list.

No.	Pos	Nat	Player	Total			A-League			FFA Cup		
No.	Pos	Nat	Player	Yellow card	Second yellow card	Red card	Yellow card	Second yellow card	Red card	Yellow card	Second yellow card	Red card
1	GK	(Australia) AUS	Lewis Italiano	0	0	1	0	0	0	0	0	1
4	DF	(Australia) AUS	Nigel Boogaard	8	0	0	8	0	0	0	0	0
44	DF	(Australia) AUS	Nikolai Topor-Stanley	6	0	0	6	0	0	0	0	0
32	FW	(Australia) AUS	Angus Thurgate	5	0	0	5	0	0	0	0	0
2	DF	(Northern Ireland) NIR	Bobby Burns	4	0	0	4	0	0	0	0	0
6	MF	(Australia) AUS	Steven Ugarkovic	4	0	0	4	0	0	0	0	0
3	DF	(Australia) AUS	Jason Hoffman	2	0	0	2	0	0	0	0	0
5	MF	(Australia) AUS	Ben Kantarovski	2	0	0	2	0	0	0	0	0
10	FW	(Australia) AUS	Dimitri Petratos	2	0	0	2	0	0	0	0	0
22	FW	(Australia) AUS	Lachlan Jackson	2	0	0	2	0	0	0	0	0
23	MF	(New Zealand) NZL	Matthew Ridenton	2	0	0	1	0	0	1	0	0
11	FW	(Australia) AUS	Nick Fitzgerald	1	0	0	1	0	0	0	0	0
16	DF	(Australia) AUS	Matthew Millar	1	0	0	1	0	0	0	0	0
17	MF	(Wales) WAL	Joe Ledley	1	0	0	1	0	0	0	0	0
18	DF	(Australia) AUS	John Koutroumbis	1	0	0	1	0	0	0	0	0
19	FW	(Australia) AUS	Kosta Petratos	1	0	0	1	0	0	0	0	0
28	MF	(Australia) AUS	Patrick Langlois	1	0	0	1	0	0	0	0	0

- (yellow card) = Number of bookings; (second yellow card) = Number of sending offs after a second yellow card; (red card) = Number of sending offs by a direct red card.

=== Clean sheets ===
Includes all competitions. The list is sorted by squad number when total clean sheets are equal. Numbers in parentheses represent games where both goalkeepers participated and both kept a clean sheet; the number in parentheses is awarded to the goalkeeper who was substituted on, whilst a full clean sheet is awarded to the goalkeeper who was on the field at the start of play. Goalkeepers with no clean sheets not included in the list.

Rank	No.	Nat.	Goalkeeper	A-League	FFA Cup	Total
1	20	(Australia)	Lewis Italiano	4	0	4
2	1	(New Zealand)	Glen Moss	2	0	2
3	40	(Australia)	Noah James	1	0	1
Total				7	0	7
