= Lucas Mauragis =

Australian soccer player

- Mauragis playing for Central Coast Mariners in 2026

Personal information
- Full name: Lucas Mauragis
- Date of birth: 4 September 2001 (age 25)
- Place of birth: Canberra, Australia
- Height: 1.81 m (5 ft 11 in)
- Position: Left-back

Team information
- Current team: Central Coast Mariners
- Number: 5

Youth career
- Merimbula Grasshoppers
- Tuggeranong United
- Canberra United

Senior career*
| Years | Team | Apps | (Gls) |
| 2018 | Belconnen United | 9 | (0) |
| 2019 | Canberra FC | 17 | (0) |
| 2020–2021 | Newcastle Jets NPL | 15 | (1) |
| 2020–2024 | Newcastle Jets | 47 | (4) |
| 2022 | → Wellington Phoenix Reserves (loan) | 5 | (0) |
| 2022–2023 | → Wellington Phoenix (loan) | 20 | (0) |
| 2024– | Central Coast Mariners | 49 | (2) |

International career^{‡}
| 2021–2024 | Australia U23 | 11 | (0) |
Medal record
Men's football
Representing Australia
WAFF U-23 Championship
| Runner-up | 2024 Saudi Arabia |
- * Club domestic league appearances and goals as of 22 November 2026 ‡ National team caps and goals as of 26 March 2024

Lucas Mauragis (Lithuanian: [ˈmɐu̯rɐɡɪs]; born 4 September 2001) is an Australian professional soccer player who plays as a left-back for the Central Coast Mariners.

== Club career ==
=== Newcastle Jets ===
Mauragis trialled with Newcastle Jets Youth in 2019 where he impressed coach Daniel McBreen who rewarded him with a contract in the youth team. The 2019-20 A-League season resumed in July 2020, on 13 October 2020 Mauragis was called up to the first team as he made his professional debut for Newcastle in a 3–0 win against Wellington Phoenix.

In the 2020-21 A-League season Mauragis started the opening two matches for Newcastle as he competed with Connor O'Toole for the starting position at left-back. After appearing regularly for the Jets in the early stages of the season he was subsequently not included in the matchday squad until the later stages of the season. Mauragis started in the teams remaining three matches of the regular season where he scored one goal and made two assists as his combination with fellow youth team player Archie Goodwin resulted in Newcastle avoiding finishing last on the table.

=== Central Coast Mariners ===
After 4 seasons at the Jets, Mauragis moved to their F3 Derby arch rivals, the Central Coast Mariners. Mauragis signed a three-year contract with the Mariners. Mauragis made his debut for the club on 7 August 2024, in a 2024 Australia Cup round of 32 tie against Heidelberg United.

== International career ==
Mauragis received his first competitive international call-up in October 2021, for the Australian under-23 team, to play in 2022 AFC U-23 Asian Cup qualification games against Indonesia in Tajikistan.

== Career statistics ==
As of match played 18 October 2022

Appearances and goals by club, season and competition
| Club | Season | League | | | Cup | | Continental | | Other | | Total | |
| Club | Season | Division | Apps | Goals | Apps | Goals | Apps | Goals | Apps | Goals | Apps | Goals |
|---|---|---|---|---|---|---|---|---|---|---|---|---|
| Newcastle Jets | 2019–20 | A League | 2 | 0 | - | - | - | - | - | - | 2 | 0 |
| Newcastle Jets | 2020–21 | A League | 13 | 1 | - | - | - | - | - | - | 13 | 1 |
| Newcastle Jets | 2021–22 | A League | 10 | 1 | 0 | 0 | - | - | 1 | 0 | 1 | 1 |
| Wellington Phoenix | 2022–23 | A League | 2 | 0 | 0 | 0 | - | - | - | - | 2 | 0 |
| Career total | | | 27 | 2 | 0 | 0 | 0 | 0 | 1 | 0 | 28 | 2 |

== Honours ==
Australia U-23

- WAFF U-23 Championship: runner-up 2024
