= Jordan O'Doherty =

Australian footballer (born 1997)

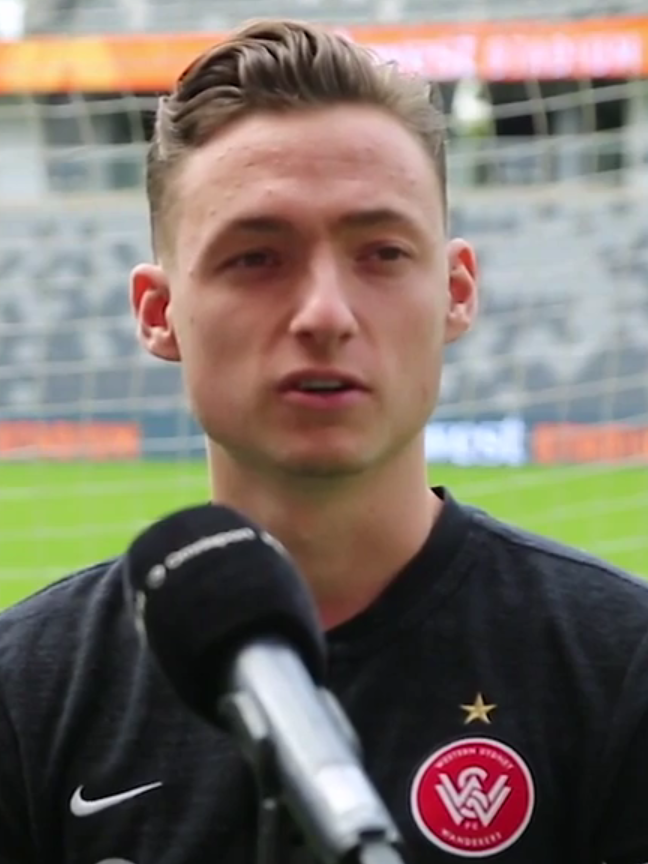
- O'Doherty in 2019

Personal information
- Full name: Jordan Luis O'Doherty
- Date of birth: 14 October 1997 (age 29)
- Place of birth: Palma, Mallorca, Spain
- Height: 1.70 m (5 ft 7 in)
- Position: Central midfielder

Team information
- Current team: Modbury Jets

Youth career
- 2013: Adelaide United

Senior career*
Years	Team	Apps	(Gls)
2013–2015	Adelaide Raiders	53	(7)
2014	→ Melbourne Knights (loan)	7	(1)
2016–2018	Adelaide United NPL	16	(6)
2016–2018	Adelaide United	28	(1)
2018–2021	Western Sydney Wanderers	35	(2)
2021	Western Sydney Wanderers NPL	1	(0)
2021–2022	Newcastle Jets	23	(0)
2022–2023	East Bengal	18	(1)
2024–	Modbury Jets	11	(1)

International career^{‡}
2017	Australia U23	2	(0)
- * Club domestic league appearances and goals as of 18 September 2024 ‡ National team caps and goals as of 23 July 2017

Jordan O'Doherty (born 14 October 1997) is an Australian professional footballer who plays as a central midfielder.

== Club career ==
=== Adelaide United ===
In August 2016, O'Doherty signed a two-year senior contract with Adelaide United after playing for their youth team. He made his A-League debut against Newcastle Jets in a 1–1 draw. Three weeks later he made his starting debut against Melbourne City in a 2–1 loss. In Round 18 against Central Coast Mariners, O'Doherty scored his first goal for Adelaide United. In May 2018, O'Doherty was released by Adelaide United.

=== Western Sydney Wanderers ===
In June 2018, O'Doherty signed a three-year contract with Western Sydney Wanderers.

At the time, O'Doherty was quoted as saying: "Coming to the Wanderers is a good opportunity for me to be somewhere for three years and really try to do the best I can in the Hyundai A-League. I want to play in as many games as possible for the club and ultimately, I want to win trophies with the team."

"To be honest, I've always enjoyed watching the Wanderers members and fans more than any other in the league. They've brought a lot of excitement to the league and they're the best in the league, so I'm looking forward to playing in front of them."

O'Doherty made his A-League debut for Western Sydney Wanderers on 27 October 2018. He came on as a substitute on 60 minutes in a Sydney Derby match away at Sydney FC. O'Doherty started the next game, against Wellington Phoenix, scoring his first goal for the Wanderers on 90+2 minutes.

O'Doherty went on to make 17 appearances (16 starts) in the 2018–19 A-League season before his season was cut short when he suffered an anterior cruciate ligament injury while playing against Perth Glory on 24 February 2019. O'Doherty was sidelined for the rest of the 2018–19 season, only returning to play for the Wanderers 362 days later, on 21 February 2020 in a game against Adelaide United. During the remainder of the 2019–20 A-League season he made ten appearances (seven starts). He scored his second goal for the Wanderers in the final match of the season, a 2–1 win over Melbourne Victory on 12 August 2020.

In May 2021, O'Doherty departed Western Sydney Wanderers.

=== East Bengal ===
In August 2022, O'Doherty moved abroad for the first time in his career and signed for Indian Super League club East Bengal on a one-year deal.

He made his Indian Super League debut against Kerala Blasters coming on as a late substitute in a 3–1 away defeat.

== Career statistics ==
=== Club ===
As of 17 April 2023

Appearances and goals by club, season and competition
Club	Season	League			Cup		Continental		Total	
Club	Season	Division	Apps	Goals	Apps	Goals	Apps	Goals	Apps	Goals
Adelaide United	2016–17	A-League	17	1	1 (Note: Appearance(s) in Australia Cup)	0	5 (Note: Appearance(s) in AFC Champions League)	1	23	2
Adelaide United	2017–18	A-League	11	0	2	0	—		13	0
Adelaide United	Total		28	1	3	0	5	1	36	2
Western Sydney Wanderers	2018–19	A-League	17	1	0	0	—		17	1
Western Sydney Wanderers	2019–20	A-League	10	1	0	0	—		10	1
Western Sydney Wanderers	2020–21	A-League	8	0	0	0	—		8	0
Western Sydney Wanderers	Total		35	2	0	0	0	0	35	2
Newcastle Jets	2020–21	A-League	5	0	0	0	—		5	0
Newcastle Jets	2021–22	A-League	18	0	1	0	—		19	0
Newcastle Jets	Total		23	0	1	0	0	0	24	0
East Bengal	2022–23	Indian Super League	18	1	3 (Note: Appearance(s) in Super Cup)	0	—		21	1
Career total			104	4	7	0	5	1	116	5
