= Riley Warland =

Australian soccer player

Personal information
- Full name: Riley Charles Warland
- Date of birth: 4 July 2002 (age 24)
- Place of birth: Perth, Australia
- Position: Centre-back

Team information
- Current team: Perth RedStar
- Number: 3

Youth career
- 2011–2018: Perth Glory
- 2018–2019: Fulham

Senior career*
Years	Team	Apps	(Gls)
2018	Perth Glory NPL	10	(0)
2020–2021	Perth Glory NPL	22	(2)
2021	Perth Glory	5	(0)
2021–2022	Newcastle Jets	11	(0)
2022–2023	Gwelup Croatia	7	(0)
2023	Perth RedStar	20	(0)
2023–2025	Perth Glory	21	(0)
2025–2026	Stirling Macedonia	8	(0)
2026–	Perth RedStar	12	(1)

International career
2017	Australia U15		
- * Club domestic league appearances and goals as of 5 June 2026

Riley Charles Warland (born 4 July 2002) is an Australian professional soccer player who plays as a centre-back for Perth RedStar in NPL WA.

== Club career ==
Warland joined the youth academy of Perth Glory as a ten-year-old. In August 2018, he left Australia to join English side Fulham on a three-year contract. After a year with Fulham, in which he made nine appearances in U18 Premier League, he returned to Perth Glory in October 2019. He made his senior debut in July 2020 playing for Perth Glory NPL in National Premier Leagues Western Australia On 20 January 2021, he made his professional debut, coming on as a second-half substitute in a 5–3 victory over Adelaide United. On 6 July 2021, Warland agreed a two-year deal with Newcastle Jets. In 2025 Warland join with Stirling Macedonia in NPL WA.

== International career ==
Warland has represented Australia at under-15 level, having been part of the squad who finished third in the 2017 AFF U-15 Championship. He scored during a 8–0 group stage victory over Singapore.

== Career statistics ==
As of match played 19 December 2021

Appearances and goals by club, season and competition
Club	Season	League			Cup		Other		Total	
Club	Season	Division	Apps	Goals	Apps	Goals	Apps	Goals	Apps	Goals
Perth Glory	2020–21	A-League	5	0	0	0	0	0	5	0
Newcastle Jets	2021–22	A-League	3	0	1	0	0	0	4	0
Career total			8	0	1	0	0	0	9	0
