= Dylan Murnane =

Australian soccer player (born 1995)

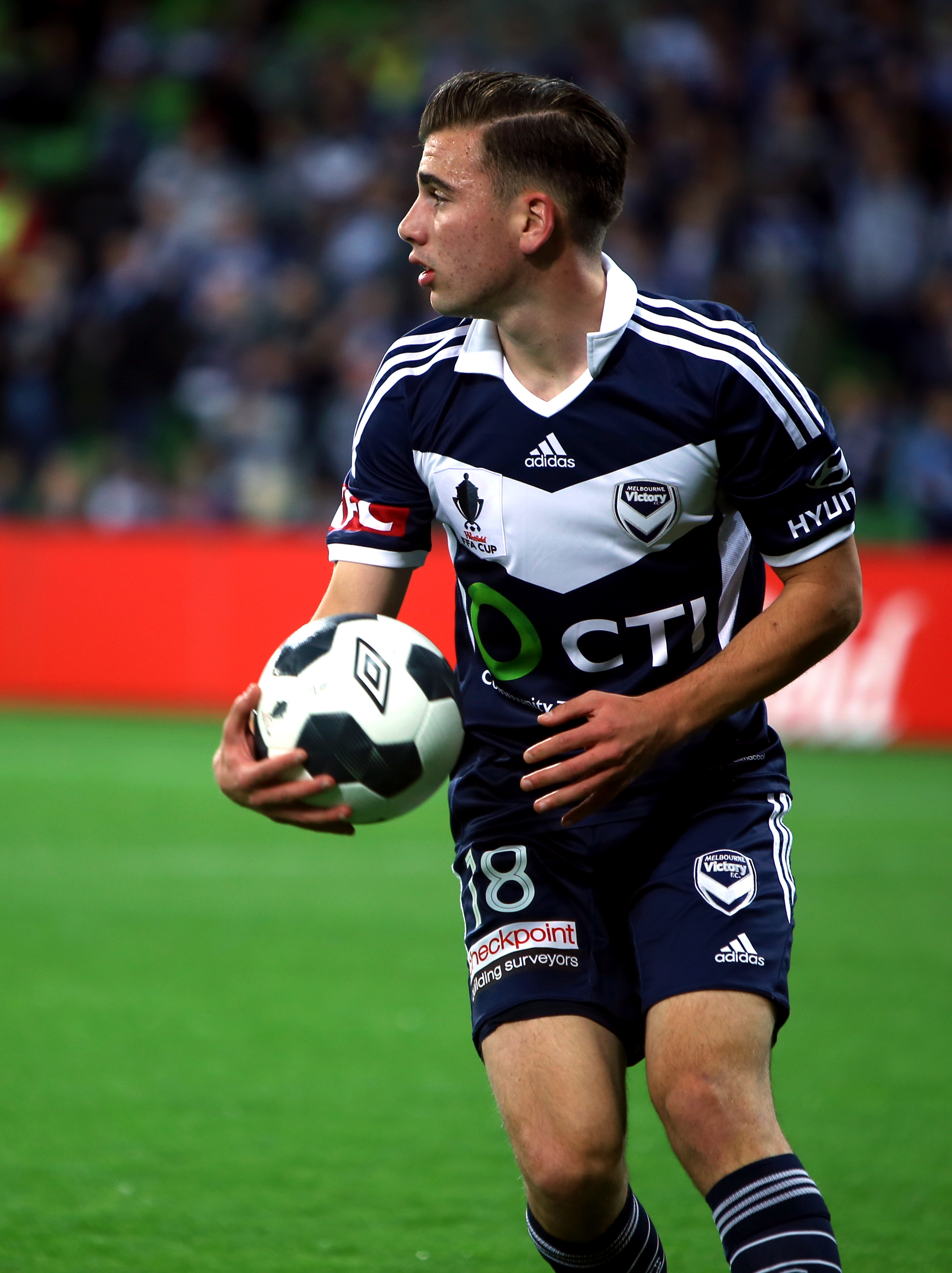
- Murnane playing for Melbourne Victory in the FFA Cup, September 2015

Personal information
- Full name: Dylan Murnane
- Date of birth: 18 January 1995 (age 31)
- Place of birth: Melbourne, Australia
- Height: 1.78 m (5 ft 10 in)
- Position: Left back

Senior career*
Years	Team	Apps	(Gls)
2012	Port Melbourne	11	(0)
2013–2016	Melbourne Victory	24	(0)
2016–2017	Kongsvinger	29	(0)
2018–2020	IFK Mariehamn	60	(3)
2021	HJK Helsinki	8	(0)
2021	→ Klubi 04	1	(0)
2021–2022	Newcastle Jets	20	(1)
2022	Melbourne Knights	7	(2)
- * Club domestic league appearances and goals as of 17 November 2022

Dylan Murnane (born 18 January 1995) is an Australian football (soccer) player who plays as a left back.

== Club career ==
In 2012, Murnane was a member of the Port Melbourne SC side that won promotion to the Victorian Premier League and reached the final of the State Knockout Cup, before he was recruited by the Melbourne Victory Youth team.

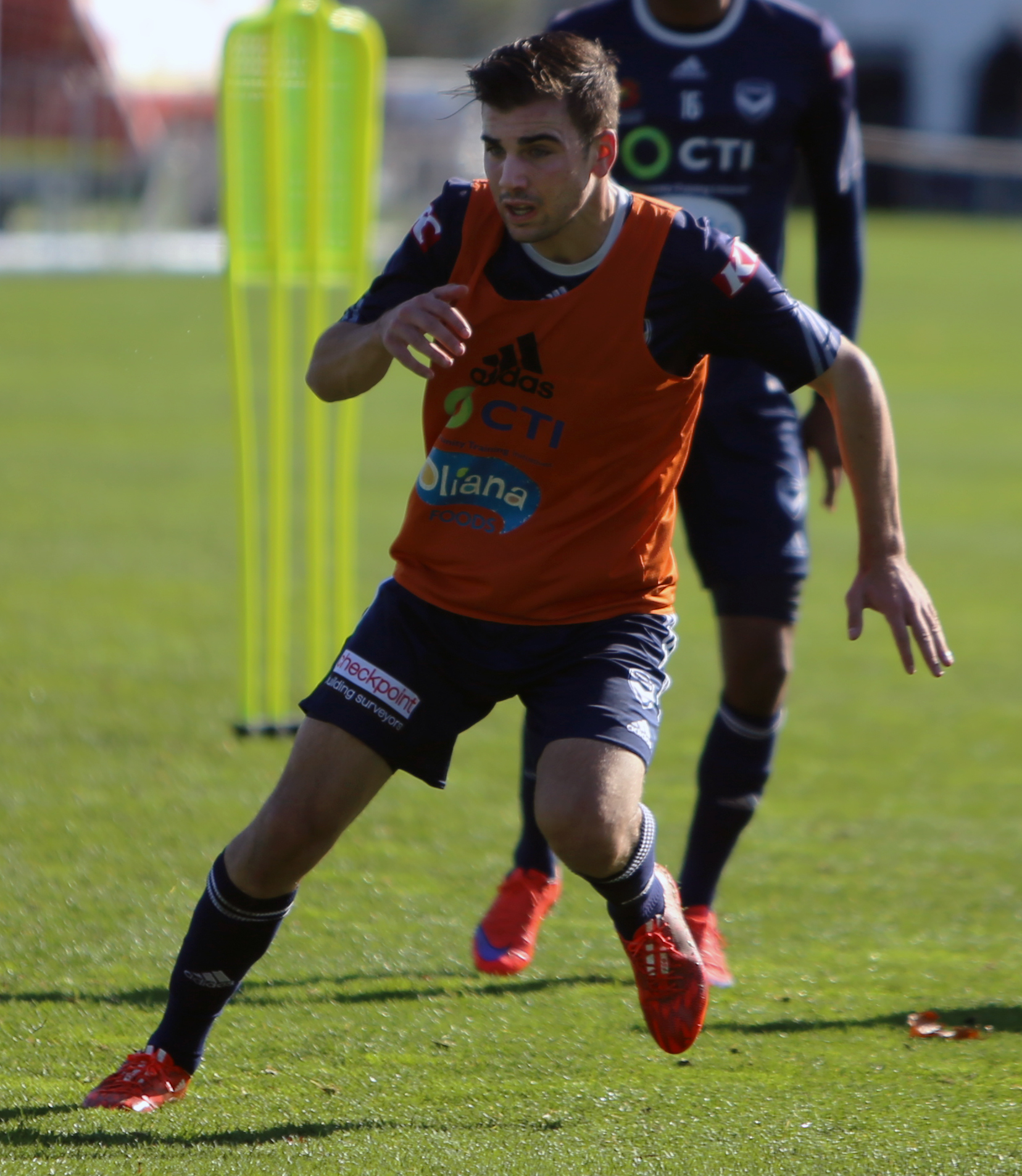
Murnane training with Melbourne Victory FC in 2015

After initially joining the club as member of the youth team in late 2012, Murnane made his professional debut with home town giants Melbourne Victory against Sydney in a 1–1 draw at Sydney Football Stadium in March 2013. He made his home debut and second appearance in a 2–3 loss against Perth Glory at AAMI Park. During the 2013/14 season he signed a contract extension with Victory that would take him through to the end of the 2015/16 season.

Murnane was released by Melbourne Victory on 28 May 2016.

On 13 September 2016 he signed a contract with the Norwegian club Kongsvinger IL Toppfotball.

In December 2017, Murnane signed for Finnish Veikkausliiga side IFK Mariehamn on a 2-year-contract with option for a third season.

In August 2021, Murnane returned to Australia, joining A-League club Newcastle Jets.

== International career ==
In August 2013, Murnane was called up to the Young Socceroos squad for the L'Alcúdia International Football Tournament alongside Victory team-mates Christopher Cristaldo and Luke Radonich.

In 2014, he was named in the squad for the 2014 AFC U-19 Championship although he did not make any appearances at the tournament as Australia was knocked out at the group stage.
