= Michael Weier =

Australian footballer (born 1997)

- Weier playing for Avondale in 2026

Personal information
- Date of birth: 27 January 1997 (age 29)
- Place of birth: Australia
- Height: 2.00 m (6 ft 7 in)
- Position: Goalkeeper

Youth career
- Redlands United
- 2015–2016: Brisbane Strikers

Senior career*
| Years | Team | Apps | (Gls) |
| 2014 | Redlands United | 2 | (0) |
| 2015–2016 | Brisbane Strikers | 0 | (0) |
| 2017–2021 | Hume City | 102 | (1) |
| 2020 | → Capalaba FC (loan) | 19 | (0) |
| 2021–2024 | Newcastle Jets | 16 | (0) |
| 2024–2025 | Hume City | 27 | (0) |
| 2026 | Green Gully | 6 | (0) |
| 2026 | Avondale | 0 | (0) |
- * Club domestic league appearances and goals as of 29 May 2024 ‡ National team caps and goals as of 18 March 2022

Michael Weier (born 27 January 1997) is an Australian former professional footballer who played as a goalkeeper.
