= Blake Archbold =

Australian soccer player

Personal information
- Full name: Blake Archbold
- Date of birth: 11 July 2001 (age 25)
- Place of birth: Newcastle, Australia
- Position: Midfielder

Team information
- Current team: Weston Bears FC
- Number: 11

Youth career
- Newcastle Jets

Senior career*
Years	Team	Apps	(Gls)
2019–2022	Newcastle Jets NPL	22	(13)
2020–2022	Newcastle Jets	7	(0)
2023–2023	Olympic FC	13	(0)
2024–	Weston Workers Bears FC	56	(18)
- * Club domestic league appearances and goals as of 20 August 2023

Blake Archbold (born 11 July 2001) is an Australian footballer who plays as a midfielder for Olympic FC. He previously played for Newcastle Jets.

Archbold made his A-League Men debut on 8 January 2021 as a substitute in a 2-1 loss to Western Sydney Wanderers. On 14 March 2021, Archbold extended his contract with the Newcastle Jets for a further season.
