= Dimitri Petratos =

Australian soccer player (born 1992)

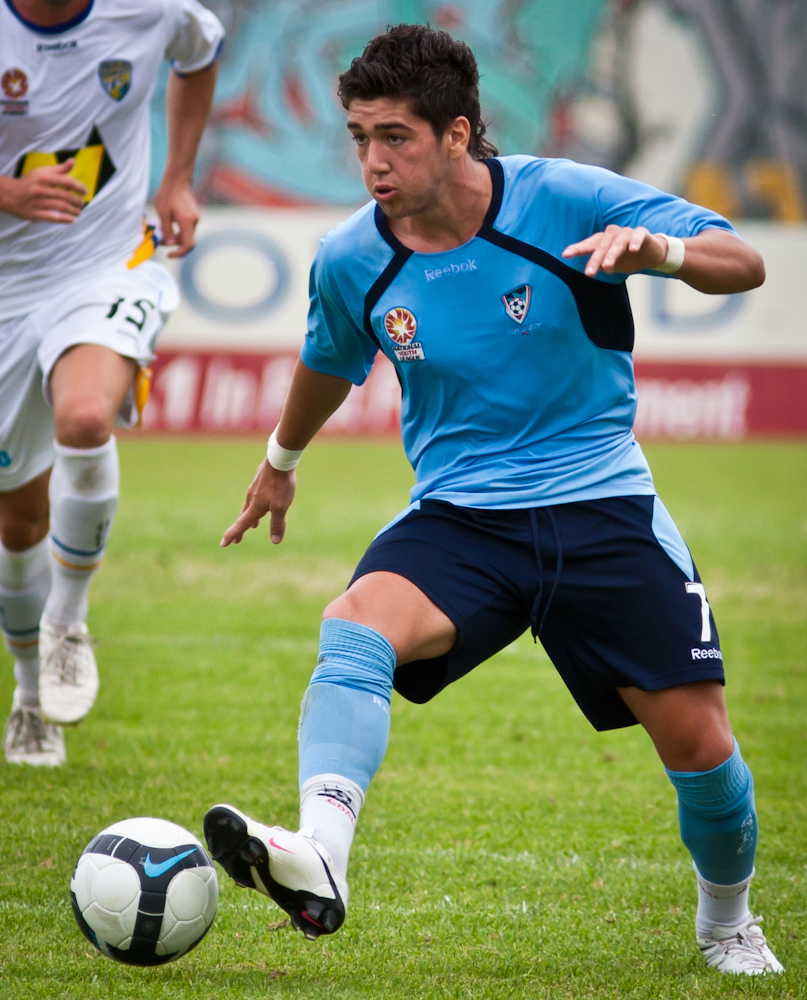
- Dimitri Petratos playing for Sydney FC in Australia

Personal information
- Full name: Dimitrios Petratos
- Date of birth: 10 November 1992 (age 34)
- Place of birth: Sydney, Australia
- Height: 1.76 m (5 ft 9 in)
- Position: Midfielder

Team information
- Current team: Sydney Olympic
- Number: 10

Youth career
- Penrith Nepean United
- 2009: Sydney Olympic
- 2009–2010: Sydney FC

Senior career*
Years	Team	Apps	(Gls)
2009	Penrith Nepean United	17	(1)
2010–2012	Sydney FC	30	(5)
2010	→ Sydney Olympic (loan)	14	(1)
2012–2013	Kelantan	0	(0)
2013–2017	Brisbane Roar	94	(15)
2017	Ulsan Hyundai	4	(0)
2017–2020	Newcastle Jets	79	(22)
2020–2022	Al-Wehda	28	(9)
2021–2022	→ Western Sydney (loan)	23	(3)
2022–2026	Mohun Bagan	73	(28)
2026–	Sydney Olympic	6	(0)

International career^{‡}
2008	Australia U17	1	(1)
2009–2011	Australia U20	9	(2)
2011	Australia U23	2	(0)
2018–2019	Australia	3	(0)
Medal record
Representing Australia
Men's Association football
AFC U-20 Asian Cup
Runner-up	2010 China
- * Club domestic league appearances and goals as of 22 November 2026 ‡ National team caps and goals as of 14:30, 7 June 2019 (UTC)

Dimitrios Petratos (born 10 November 1992) is an Australian professional soccer player who plays as a forward for Sydney Olympic in the Australian Championship.

Petratos has played for four different A-League clubs, winning one championship with Brisbane Roar. The majority of Petratos's career has been in the A-League. He played in Malaysia, South Korea, Saudi Arabia, before moving to India, where he achieved a cult following at the country's oldest club, Mohun Bagan Super Giant.

Compared to club legends like José Barreto and Sony Norde, Petratos cemented his status as a Mohun Bagan great owing to his exceptional performances on the field and extensive fan engagement off it. Nicknamed "Dimi-God" by the Bagan faithful, Petratos is often credited with single-handedly carrying the club to their first ever ISL Cup and ISL Shield Titles in the 2022/23 and 2023/24 seasons respectively.

== Club career ==
=== Sydney FC ===
Petratos made his debut as a substitute for Sydney FC in their Round 13, 1–0 victory over Newcastle Jets at the Sydney Football Stadium during the 2010–11 season. He played continually since his debut off the bench and was in the starting 11 in some games. He scored his first senior A-League goal against Gold Coast United on 8 January 2011 which set Sydney on their way to a 2–0 victory.

Sydney FC secured him to a new two-year professional contract on 13 January 2011, replacing his youth league contract. Petratos secured his position as one of the brightest up and coming talents for Sydney, when he scored a brace against rivals Central Coast Mariners in a 2–2 draw at Bluetounge Stadium. Following a reported bust-up with Zeljko Kalac, Petratos requested for and was granted a release from Sydney FC, allowing him to pursue a move to Malaysian Super League Champions Kelantan.

=== Kelantan ===
On 7 December 2012, Petratos made a goalscoring debut for Malaysian side Kelantan in a pre-season friendly against Perlis which ended 5–0. Petratos immediately had a very strong connection and passion with the fans and supporters and in the month of December 2012 continued his goal scoring form, scoring four goals in four games He then scored another two goals against Penang FA on 24 December to take his tally to six goals in five friendly games.

Foreign player restrictions in the Malaysian Super League meant Petratos played exclusively in the 2013 AFC Cup, where Kelantan were drawn in Group G along with Maziya S&RC, Ayeyawady United and SHB Đà Nẵng. He featured in all seven matches for Kelantan in the competition, scoring four goals as they were knocked out by Kitchee SC at the quarter-final stage.

=== Brisbane Roar ===
In June 2013, Petratos was signed by the Roar on a one-year deal, along with former Melbourne Victory defensive midfielder Diogo Ferreira.

On 26 December 2013, Petratos scored his first career hat trick against his former club Sydney FC. On 17 July, Petratos scored the opening goal against Premier League giants Liverpool.

After a poor 2014–15 season, Petratos immediately made amends with a stellar 2015–16 'breakout' season. Petratos capped off a classic comeback victory for the Roar in Round 22 against the Western Sydney Wanderers, contributing a goal and an assist to Roar's 3–2 win. Petratos backed up his best career form with a goal of the season contender against Melbourne City, scoring on the half-volley from 35-metres out. He managed to feature in all of Brisbane's 29 games, finishing with a goal tally of 7 and an equally impressive 5 assists.

=== Ulsan Hyundai ===
On 24 January 2017, Petratos was signed, along with his brother Kosta by Newcastle Jets on a 3-year contract, starting in the 2017–18 season. However, less than two weeks later, he accepted an offer to join Korean club Ulsan Hyundai on a 3-year deal for a sum of $300,000, which would be split evenly between Newcastle and Brisbane.

=== Newcastle Jets ===
On 13 June 2017, following his release from Ulsan Hyundai, Petratos signed a two-year deal with Newcastle Jets.

=== Mohun Bagan ===
On 18 July 2022, Petratos joined Indian Super League club Mohun Bagan. On 10 October he made his debut against Chennaiyin FC, during which he provided the assist for Manvir Singh's opening goal. He quickly proved his worth to the team by scoring a hat-trick against Kerala Blasters in only his second game. As the season progressed, he emerged as a key player for his team, leading them to finish third in the points table and eventually guiding them to the Indian Super League playoffs final.

In the final against Bengaluru FC, Petratos demonstrated his skill and composure by scoring both the goals for his team, which included two penalties, as the game ended in a 2–2 draw after extra time. He also scored his penalty in the resulting shoot-out, which ultimately led his team to win the ISL trophy. Petratos finished the season with an impressive twelve goals and seven assists in 23 matches, cementing his status as a valuable member of the team.

Petratos scored the only goal in 2023 Durand Cup final against Mohun Bagan’s rival, East Bengal FC to lift the record 17th Durand Cup title for Mohun Bagan Super Giant. Petratos had a great stint for the Mariners in the 2023–24 Indian Super League, winning the ISL Golden Ball and the maiden Indian Super League Shield for Bagan.

In the following 2024–25 season, he helped Mohun Bagan win back-to-back ISL League Shields; the first club in ISL history to successfully defend the Shield. Fittingly, Petratos scored the dramatic late winner against Odisha FC that helped seal the title.

Even more amusingly cinematic: despite being one of Bagan’s talismans, he was sometimes used as a substitute under coach José Molina, only to repeatedly arrive like some footballing third-act twist and decide matches anyway. ESPN described him as "the most clutch ISL player ever."

By 2025, Petratos had established himself as a key figure for the Mariners, contributing to their Durand Cup triumph, winning the ISL Golden Ball, and playing an important role in the club's League Shield success. He also formed an effective attacking partnership with Jason Cummings.

Following a dismal final season riddled with obstacles, Petratos' Mohun Bagan career came to an end following the 2025-26 season, as the club managed to win the prestigious IFA Shield but finished second on goal difference in the league to their arch-nemesis East Bengal. Racking up an impressive tally of 60 goals and assists in 106 games for the club, he won six trophies over the course of almost four years.

Petratos' individual achievements include ISL Player of the League (2023-2024), Mohun Bagan Shibdas Bhaduri Award (Best Player) (2024), and the Mohun Bagan Subhash Bhowmick Award (Best Striker) (2023).

== International career ==
After rumours all season about an international call up Petratos was selected in the Australia squad for the friendlies before the World Cup. Petratos started on the left wing in his international debut against Norway on 24 March 2018, playing 74 minutes before coming off for Robbie Kruse. Petratos made little impact as Australia lost 4–1 to Norway. Petratos started Australia's 2nd friendly on the bench against Colombia on 28 March and was an unused substitute as Australia drew 0–0 with Colombia.

In May 2018, he was named in Australia's 23-man squad for the 2018 World Cup in Russia.

== Personal life ==
Petratos is of Greek ancestry, and comes from a footballing family. His father Angelo played as a defender for Sydney Olympic FC, his younger brother Kosta was his teammate at the Jets, his younger sister Panayiota previously played for the Newcastle W-League team in 2021, his younger brother Maki played for the Newcastle Jets and his youngest sister Anastasia is currently playing at Sydney Olympic FC.

== Career statistics ==
=== Club ===
As of matches played 21 May 2026

Appearances and goals by club, season and competition
Club	Season	League			National cup (Note: Includes Australia Cup, King Cup, AIFF Super Cup)		Continental		Other		Total	
Club	Season	Division	Apps	Goals	Apps	Goals	Apps	Goals	Apps	Goals	Apps	Goals
Penrith Nepean United	2009	NSW Premier League	17	1	—		—		—		17	1
Penrith Nepean United	Total		17	1	0	0	0	0	0	0	17	1
Sydney	2010–11	A-League	16	3	—		4 (Note: Appearances in AFC Champions League)	0	—		20	3
Sydney	2011–12	A-League	13	2	—		—		—		13	2
Sydney	2012–13	A-League	1	0	—		—		—		1	0
Sydney	Total		30	5	0	0	4	0	0	0	34	5
Sydney Olympic (loan)	2010	NSW Premier League	14	1	—		—		—		14	1
Kelantan	2013	Malaysia Super League	0	0	0	0	7 (Note: Appearances in AFC Cup/AFC Champions League Two)	4	—		7	4
Brisbane Roar	2013–14	A-League	27	5	—		—		—		27	5
Brisbane Roar	2014–15	A-League	24	1	0	0	4	0	—		28	1
Brisbane Roar	2015–16	A-League	29	7	0	0	—		—		29	7
Brisbane Roar	2016–17	A-League	14	2	0	0	—		—		14	2
Brisbane Roar	Total		94	15	0	0	4	0	0	0	98	15
Ulsan Hyundai	2017	K League 1	4	0	0	0	5	0	—		9	0
Newcastle Jets	2017–18	A-League	27	10	1	0	—		—		28	10
Newcastle Jets	2018–19	A-League	26	7	2	0	2	0	—		30	7
Newcastle Jets	2019–20	A-League	26	5	3	3	—		—		29	8
Newcastle Jets	Total		79	22	6	3	2	0	0	0	87	25
Al-Wehda	2020–21	Saudi Pro League	28	9	1	0	1	0	—		30	9
Western Sydney Wanderers (loan)	2021–22	A-League	23	3	2	0	—		—		25	3
Mohun Bagan	2022–23	Indian Super League	23	12	3	0	—		1 (Note: Appearance and goal in Indian club qualifiers for 2023–24 AFC competitions)	1	27	13
Mohun Bagan	2023–24	Indian Super League	23	10	3	1	4	3	5 (Note: Appearances in Durand Cup)	1	35	15
Mohun Bagan	2024–25	Indian Super League	24	4	0	0	1	0	3	1	28	5
Mohun Bagan	2025–26	Indian Super League	12	2	2	0	—		3 (Note: One appearances in Durand Cup, two appearances and one goal in IFA Shield)	1	17	3
Mohun Bagan	Total		82	28	8	1	5	3	12	4	107	36
Career total			368	84	17	4	28	7	12	4	428	99

=== International ===
National team	Year	Apps	Goals
Australia	2018	2	0
Australia	2019	1	0
Total		3	0

== Honours ==
=== Player ===
Brisbane Roar

- A-League Premiership: 2013–14
- A-League Championship: 2013–14

Mohun Bagan

- Indian Super League Shield: 2023–24, 2024–25
- Indian Super League Cup: 2022–23, 2024–25; runner-up: 2023–24
- Durand Cup: 2023; runner-up: 2024
- IFA Shield: 2025

Australia U-20

- AFC U-20 Asian Cup: runner-up 2010*
- AFF U-19 Youth Championship: 2010

=== Individual ===
- Indian Super League Player of the League: 2023–24
- Indian Super League Player of the Month: October 2022, March 2024, April 2024
- Mohun Bagan Best Striker Award and MohunBagan Best Player Award: 2023 and 2024
- A-League Young Player of the Month: January 2014, January 2016
