= Maki Petratos =

Australian soccer player

Personal information
- Full name: Yerasimakis Petratos
- Date of birth: 11 September 2000 (age 26)
- Place of birth: Australia
- Position: Midfielder

Team information
- Current team: Bentleigh Greens
- Number: 7

Youth career
- FNSW NTC
- Central Coast Mariners

Senior career*
Years	Team	Apps	(Gls)
2017	CCM Academy	26	(6)
2018–2020	Newcastle Jets NPL	39	(17)
2019–2021	Newcastle Jets	7	(0)
2021–2022	Karaiskakis	3	(0)
2022	Heidelberg United	8	(3)
2023–2024	St George City	52	(7)
2025	Sutherland Sharks	21	(11)
2026–	Bentleigh Greens	26	(14)
- * Club domestic league appearances and goals as of 1 September 2026 ‡ National team caps and goals as of 30 November 2019

Yerasimakis "Maki" Petratos (born 11 September 2000) is an Australian professional footballer who plays as a midfielder for Bentleigh Greens in the NPL Victoria competition.

== Club career ==
=== Newcastle Jets ===
In June 2019, Petratos signed a scholarship contract with Newcastle Jets. In September 2020, Petratos signed a 2-year contract extension, together with his brother Kosta. Half-a-year later, he left the club.

=== Heidelberg United ===
After a brief spell in Greece, Petratos along with his brother Kosta signed with NPL Victoria club Heidelberg United. The two brothers helped The Bergers qualify to the Elimination Finals but losing on penalties to the eventual winners, Oakleigh Cannons.

== Personal life ==
Petratos is of Greek ancestry, and comes from a footballing family. His father Angelo played as a defender for Sydney Olympic FC, his older brothers Dimitri and Kosta and youngest sister Anastasia are also footballers, while his younger sister Panagiota previously played for the Newcastle W-League team in 2021.
