= Angus Thurgate =

Australian soccer player

Personal information
- Full name: Angus Charles Thurgate
- Date of birth: 8 February 2000 (age 26)
- Place of birth: Port Macquarie, Australia
- Height: 1.78 m (5 ft 10 in)
- Position: Central midfielder

Team information
- Current team: Western Sydney Wanderers
- Number: 32

Youth career
- 2014–2015: Football Mid North Coast
- 2015–2018: Newcastle Jets

Senior career*
Years	Team	Apps	(Gls)
2016–2018	Newcastle Jets NPL	34	(4)
2018–2023	Newcastle Jets	116	(11)
2023–2025	Western United	55	(3)
2025–	Western Sydney Wanderers	11	(0)

International career^{‡}
2018–2020	Australia U20	4	(1)
- * Club domestic league appearances and goals as of 14 September 2025 ‡ National team caps and goals as of 30 October 2018

Angus Thurgate (/ˈθɜːrɡeɪt/ THUR-gayt; born 8 February 2000) is an Australian professional footballer who plays as a central midfielder for Western Sydney Wanderers.

Thurgate holds the record for being the youngest player in A-League Men history to reach 150 appearances, achieving the milestone in December 2024 at the age of 24.

== Club career ==
=== Newcastle Jets ===
After playing for the Newcastle Jets Reserves since 2016, Thurgate was called up to the first team in January 2018 in their round 14 away match against Sydney FC, Thurgate was an unused substitute as the match finished 2–2. He then made his professional debut 2 rounds later at home against Brisbane Roar coming on as an 88th-minute substitute for striker Andrew Nabbout.

In the 2018–19 A-League, Thurgate scored 1 goal out of his 9 appearances. His goal came against Western Sydney Wanderers on 4 June 2019.

In November 2019, Thurgate scored in two consecutive matches against Western United and Wanderers respectively.

At the conclusion of the 2022–23 A-League season, Thurgate departed Newcastle after 125 appearances and 11 goals in all competitions.

=== Western United ===
In May 2023, Thurgate signed a three-year contract with Western United. Thurgate made 55 league appearances for Western United over 2 seasons at the club, including winning the club's player of the season award in the 2024-25 season, however following the suspension of Western United's participation in the 2025–26 season, all players – including Thurgate – were released from their contracts in September 2025.

=== Western Sydney Wanderers ===
Following his release from Western United, Thurgate joined Western Sydney Wanderers ahead of the 2025-26 season on a three-year-deal.

== Honours ==
Individual

- A-League Men Young Footballer of the Year: 2021–22
- A-Leagues All Star: 2024
