= Noah James =

Australian soccer player

Personal information
- Full name: Noah Paul James
- Date of birth: 14 February 2001 (age 25)
- Place of birth: Newcastle, Australia
- Height: 1.85 m (6 ft 1 in)
- Position: Goalkeeper

Team information
- Current team: Broadmeadow Magic FC
- Number: 66

Senior career*
Years	Team	Apps	(Gls)
2018–2023	Newcastle Jets NPL	55	(0)
2018–2026	Newcastle Jets	8	(0)
2020–2021	→ Western Sydney Wanderers (loan)	0	(0)
2021	→ Western Sydney Wanderers NPL (loan)	1	(0)
2022	→ Dandenong Thunder (loan)	25	(0)
2024	→ Sydney Olympic (loan)	20	(0)
2026–	Broadmeadow Magic FC	3	(0)

International career^{‡}
2019	Australia U20	4	(0)
Medal record
Men's football
Representing Australia
AFF U-19 Youth Championship
First place	2019 Vietnam	U-20 Team
AFF U-16 Youth Championship
First place	2016 Cambodia	U-17 Team
- * Club domestic league appearances and goals as of 10 February 2025 ‡ National team caps and goals as of 14 August 2020

Noah Paul James (born 14 February 2001) is an Australian professional soccer player who last played as a goalkeeper for Newcastle Jets.

== Club career ==
=== Newcastle Jets ===
James nearly featured as the substitute goalkeeper for Newcastle Jets in the 2018 A-League Grand Final, but was ineligible as he had not participated in the 2017–18 Y-League.

James and Jack Simmons signed senior scholarship contracts with the Jets in October 2018.

In July 2019, James was called up to the Australian under-20 side.

James was injured for several months at the start of 2020 after rupturing ligaments in his hand. He made his A-League debut for the Jets in a win over Wellington Phoenix in the Jets' final game of the 2019–20 A-League, earning praise from coach Carl Robinson.

==== Loan to Western Sydney Wanderers ====
On 30 December 2020, James was loaned to Western Sydney Wanderers for the 2020–21 A-League after extending his Newcastle Jets' contract by 3 years.

==== Loan to Dandenong Thunder ====
On 10 February 2022, James was loaned out to Dandenong Thunder SC for the 2022 NPL Victoria season.

== Honours ==
=== International ===
Australia U20

- AFF U-19 Youth Championship: 2019

Australia U17

- AFF U-16 Youth Championship: 2016
