= Luka Prso =

Australian soccer player

Personal information
- Full name: Luka Prso
- Date of birth: 22 January 2001 (age 25)
- Place of birth: Sydney, Australia
- Height: 1.88 m (6 ft 2 in)
- Position: Midfielder

Team information
- Current team: Kisvárda-Master Good II

Youth career
- Castle Hill United
- 2013–2017: FNSW NTC
- 2017–2019: Dinamo Zagreb
- 2019–2020: Olimpija Ljubljana
- 2020: Osijek

Senior career*
Years	Team	Apps	(Gls)
2020	Osijek II	4	(0)
2021	Osijek	0	(0)
2021	→ Newcastle Jets (loan)	17	(1)
2021–2022	Wellington Phoenix	0	(0)
2022	Melbourne Victory NPL	14	(1)
2022–2023	Melbourne Victory	0	(0)
2023–2024	SV Stripfing	7	(0)
2023	→ NK Bistrica (loan)	12	(0)
2024	ND Bilje	11	(1)
2024–2025	Gorica	6	(0)
2025–	Kisvárda-Master Good II	13	(3)

International career^{‡}
2021–	Australia U23	3	(0)
- * Club domestic league appearances and goals as of 13 January 2026 ‡ National team caps and goals as of 1 November 2021

Luka Prso (Pru-sha) is an Australian professional footballer.

== Club career ==
In October 2020, Prso joined Osijek on a three-year deal, later being loaned out to A-League side Newcastle Jets for the rest of the season.

A year later, in October 2021, Prso negotiated an early release from Osijek and joined A-League club Wellington Phoenix for the 2021–22 A-League Men season.

In January 2022, Prso joined Melbourne Victory on a 1.5 year deal after leaving Wellington Phoenix.

== International career ==
Prso is eligible to play for Croatia, Australia and Serbia at international level and has been involved in the youth squads of the latter two.

== Personal life ==
Prso is the nephew of former Croatian international footballer Dado Pršo.
