= Connor O'Toole =

Australian footballer (born 1997)

Personal information
- Full name: Connor Neil Kazuki O'Toole
- Date of birth: 4 July 1997 (age 29)
- Place of birth: Sydney, Australia
- Height: 1.78 m (5 ft 10 in)
- Position: Left-back

Team information
- Current team: Hurstville Zagreb
- Number: 24

Youth career
- 2015–2016: Adelaide United

Senior career*
Years	Team	Apps	(Gls)
2016–2017	Brisbane Roar NPL	8	(0)
2016–2020	Brisbane Roar	31	(0)
2020–2021	Newcastle Jets	27	(1)
2021–2023	Sydney FC	15	(0)
2023–2024	Western United	9	(1)
2025	Sydney Olympic	21	(0)
2026–	Hurstville Zagreb	4	(0)

International career^{‡}
2015–2016	Australia U-20	7	(0)
2019–2021	Australia U-23	5	(0)
Medal record
Men's football
Representing Australia
AFC U-23 Asian Cup
Third place	2020 Thailand	U-23 Team
AFF U-19 Youth Championship
First place	2016 Vietnam	U-20 Team
- * Club domestic league appearances and goals as of 22 March 2026 ‡ National team caps and goals as of 2 August 2021

Connor Neil Kazuki O'Toole (born 4 July 1997) is an Australian professional footballer who plays as a left-back for Hurstville Zagreb in NPL NSW League One.

O'Toole has represented the Australian under-20 national team on several occasions.

== Early life ==
O'Toole was born in Sydney, Australia to a Japanese mother and Irish father. He has one sister who is a former national figure skater. As a junior his father chose to enrol him with Football Mundial Academy playing small sided football until U12's. At 13 he was selected as part of the Project 22 elite program conducted by FNSW where he trained and played in for 2 years. Rather than following the traditional youth league pathway in Sydney he went to Japan to attend Seiritsu Gakuen High School in Tokyo, Japan for three years where he was part of their successful football program.

== Playing career ==
=== Club ===
In November 2015, O'Toole was named in the Adelaide United youth team squad for the 2015–16 National Youth League.

O'Toole signed for A-League club Brisbane Roar in May 2016 on a two-year professional deal along with fellow young defender Kye Rowles. O'Toole made his professional debut for the Roar on 26 April 2017, in an AFC Champions League group stage game against Muangthong United, coming on as a second-half substitute for Luke DeVere in a 3–0 loss.

O’Toole made his A-League debut on 11 November 2017, seeing out a 1–1 draw with Melbourne Victory at Etihad Stadium. He started and played a full A-League match for the first time the following week, impressing in a 3–1 win over Melbourne City FC at home.

In January 2020, O'Toole left the Roar for fellow A-League side Newcastle Jets. He signed a two-year extension with the Jets in March 2021. Despite this, in July 2021 the club announced that his contract was mutually terminated. The following day Sydney FC announced they had signed O'Toole on a two-year contract.

After a season and a half at Sydney FC, O'Toole had his contract mutually terminated. The following day he joined Western United.

=== International ===
O'Toole was first called up to the Australian under-20 side in October 2015, making two appearances in the successful 2016 AFC U-19 Championship qualification tournament. He was later included in the squad for the 2016 AFF U-19 Youth Championship by incoming coach Ufuk Talay in September 2015. Australia went on to win the title, defeating Thailand 5–1 in the final, with O'Toole setting up Keanu Baccus for the first of Australia's goals from a corner. Later that month O'Toole was named in the squad for the 2016 AFC U-19 Championship.

== Career statistics ==
=== Club ===
As of 6 May 2022

Club	Season	League			Cup		Continental		Total	
Club	Season	Division	Apps	Goals	Apps	Goals	Apps	Goals	Apps	Goals
Brisbane Roar	2016–17	A-League	0	0	0	0	1	0	1	0
Brisbane Roar	2017–18	A-League	14	0	0	0	0	0	14	0
Brisbane Roar	2018–19	A-League	15	0	1	0	0	0	16	0
Brisbane Roar	2019–20	A-League	2	0	2	0	0	0	4	0
Brisbane Roar	Total		31	0	3	0	1	0	35	0
Newcastle Jets	2019–20	A-League	5	0	0	0	0	0	5	0
Newcastle Jets	2020–21	A-League	12	1	0	0	0	0	12	1
Newcastle Jets	Total		17	1	0	0	0	0	17	1
Sydney FC	2021–22	A-League	13	0	0	0	4	0	17	0
Sydney FC	Total		13	0	0	0	5	0	17	0
Career total			61	1	3	0	5	0	69	1

== Honours ==
=== International ===
Australia

- AFF U-19 Youth Championship: 2016

== See also ==
- List of Brisbane Roar FC players
