= John Koutroumbis =

Australian footballer

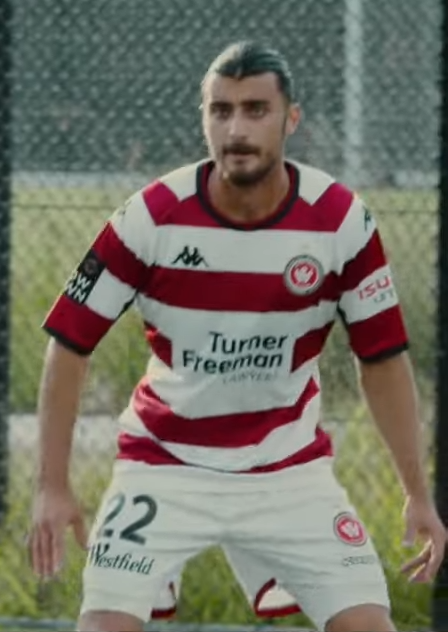
- Koutroumbis with Western Sydney Wanderers in 2021

Personal information
- Date of birth: 6 March 1998 (age 28)
- Place of birth: Adelaide, Australia
- Height: 1.83 m (6 ft 0 in)
- Position: Right-back

Team information
- Current team: Motherwell
- Number: 22

Youth career
- West Adelaide

Senior career*
Years	Team	Apps	(Gls)
2015	West Adelaide	17	(2)
2016	Adelaide United NPL	14	(0)
2016–2021	Newcastle Jets	90	(3)
2021–2022	Western Sydney Wanderers	17	(1)
2022–2024	Perth Glory	40	(0)
2024–	Motherwell	33	(1)

International career^{‡}
2019	Australia U23	2	(0)
- * Club domestic league appearances and goals as of 20 May 2026 ‡ National team caps and goals as of 25 March 2019

John "Johnny" Koutroumbis (born 6 March 1998) is an Australian professional soccer player who plays as a right back for Scottish Premiership club Motherwell.

== Club career ==
=== Newcastle Jets ===
After initially signing with Newcastle Jets as an injury replacement for Daniel Alessi, on 2 February 2017, Newcastle Jets signed Koutroumbis on a two-year deal. He mutually terminated his contract with the club in July 2021.

=== Western Sydney Wanderers ===
In July 2021, Koutroumbis joined Western Sydney Wanderers on a two-year deal. After making 17 league appearances, his contract was mutually terminated in July 2022.

=== Perth Glory ===
On 29 July 2022, Koutroumbis signed for Perth Glory on a two-year deal. He made 40 appearances for the club, before departing at the end of the 2023–24 season, upon the end of his contract, in order to pursue an overseas opportunity.

=== Motherwell ===
On 15 June 2024, it was announced that Koutroumbis would join Scottish Premiership club Motherwell on a free transfer on 1 July, signing a two-year contract.

On 3 April 2026, Motherwell announced that they had extended their contract with Koutroumbis until the summer of 2028.

== Personal life ==
Born in Australia, Koutroumbis is of Greek descent.

In 2018, Koutrombis was temporarily sidelined after being diagnosed with stage 1 thyroid cancer.

== Career statistics ==
=== Club ===
As of match played on 9 November 2025

Club	Season	League			National cup (Note: Includes Scottish Cup)		League cup (Note: Includes Scottish League Cup)		Other		Total	
Club	Season	Division	Apps	Goals	Apps	Goals	Apps	Goals	Apps	Goals	Apps	Goals
Motherwell	2024–25	Scottish Premiership	8	0	0	0	0	0	—		8	0
Motherwell	2025–26	Scottish Premiership	10	1	0	0	6	0	—		16	1
Motherwell	Total		18	1	0	0	6	0	—		24	1
Career totals			18	1	0	0	6	0	—		24	1
