= Lewis Italiano =

Australian soccer player

Personal information
- Full name: Lewis Italiano
- Date of birth: 10 December 1990 (age 35)
- Place of birth: Perth, Australia
- Height: 1.91 m (6 ft 3 in)
- Position: Goalkeeper

Team information
- Current team: Oakleigh Cannons

Youth career
- Stirling Lions
- 2006–2007: Balcatta

Senior career*
Years	Team	Apps	(Gls)
2007–2010	Inglewood United	3	(0)
2011	Balcatta	22	(0)
2011–2012	Perth Glory	0	(0)
2012	Balcatta	2	(0)
2012	Oakleigh Cannons	18	(0)
2012–2013	Perth Glory	0	(0)
2013	Oakleigh Cannons	12	(0)
2013–2017	Wellington Phoenix	6	(0)
2014–2017	Wellington Phoenix Reserves	21	(0)
2016	→ ECU Joondalup (loan)	19	(0)
2017	Bulleen Lions	7	(0)
2017–2018	Wellington Phoenix	13	(0)
2017–2018	Wellington Phoenix Reserves	2	(0)
2018	Stirling Lions	6	(0)
2018–2021	Newcastle Jets	30	(0)
2019	→ Balcatta (loan)	8	(0)
2021	Balcatta	7	(0)
2022–	Oakleigh Cannons	2	(0)
- * Club domestic league appearances and goals as of 12 September 2022

Lewis Italiano (born 10 December 1990) is an Australian professional soccer player who plays as a goalkeeper.

== Club career ==
Italiano played his junior football at Stirling Lions and later Balcatta. He moved to Inglewood United and, aged 18, gained his league debut in May 2008 against Floreat Athena. Despite an impressive start with the club, first team opportunities were scarce across three seasons with Inglewood.

Italiano returned to Balcatta in 2011 and quickly became the clubs' first choice goalkeeper. In 22 league appearances he tallied up eight clean sheets to play a key role in Balcatta lifting their first Premier League title.

A summer deal with A-League club Perth Glory followed, however, Italiano's involvement throughout the 2011–12 campaign was restricted to watching from the bench. That was offset by regular appearances for the clubs' youth team which finished the home and away series in second place.

After a short spell with Balcatta, Italiano headed east where he played an important role in Oakleigh Cannons finishing the Victorian Premier League in second spot. By October he was back with Glory having agreed a season-long deal as an injury replacement for Neil Young.

Released by Perth without making a first team appearance, Italiano re-joined Oakleigh where he caught the eye of the then new Wellington Phoenix coach Ernie Merrick. He signed with Wellington in June 2013 and was handed the number 20 shirt for the coming A-League season.

On 23 July 2014, Italiano played part of the second half of his club's friendly with London side West Ham United F.C. at Eden Park, making a notable save late on in an eventual 2–1 win for Wellington.

Italiano made his A-League debut on 26 April 2015, playing the full match for Wellington Phoenix in a 2–1 loss against Sydney FC, instead of the injured Glen Moss.

In May 2016, Italiano joined ECU Joondalup on loan for the remainder of the NPL WA season to get more game-time. In September 2016, after ECU Joondalup lost to Inglewood United in the preliminary final, Italiano returned to Wellington Phoenix after playing 17 games with ECU Joondalup and keeping 10 clean-sheets.

In March and April 2017, Italiano played back to back matches for the Phoenix for the first time, in a 5-0 win over Newcastle Jets FC and a 3-0 win over Melbourne Victory FC.

Italiano left the Phoenix in May 2017, joining National Premier Leagues Victoria side Bulleen Lions. He returned to the Phoenix one month later on a new one-season contract after strong performances for Bulleen and the appointment of new Wellington coach Darije Kalezić.

After his contracted ended at the Wellington Phoenix, Italiano returned to his youth club Stirling Lions for the rest of their season.

After completing a trial period Italiano was signed by Newcastle Jets where he joined former Wellington teammate Glen Moss. Italiano made five appearances in his first season for Newcastle while Moss was injured. He then established himself as the Jets first choice goalkeeper after Moss suffered a long term injury the following season.

On 31 August 2022, Italiano signed for Oakleigh Cannons for their 2022 Australia Cup game later that day under an emergency dispensation following injuries to other goalkeepers at the club. He started in a 2–1 upset victory for the Cannons.
