= Kosta Petratos =

Australian soccer player

Personal information
- Full name: Kosta Petratos
- Date of birth: 1 March 1998 (age 28)
- Place of birth: Sydney, Australia
- Height: 1.81 m (5 ft 11 in)
- Position: Forward

Team information
- Current team: Sydney Olympic

Youth career
- 2013: FNSW NTC
- 2015–2017: Perth Glory
- 2017–2020: Newcastle Jets

Senior career*
Years	Team	Apps	(Gls)
2014–2015	FFA CoE	25	(4)
2016–2017	Perth Glory	9	(0)
2016–2017	Perth Glory NPL	12	(4)
2017–2021	Newcastle Jets	24	(1)
2018–2020	Newcastle Jets NPL	10	(2)
2022	Olympias Lympion		
2022	Heidelberg United	8	(1)
2023–2024	St George City	57	(20)
2025	Sutherland Sharks	1	(0)
2026–	NWS Spirit	25	(9)
2026–	Sydney Olympic	6	(0)

International career^{‡}
2014–2015	Australia U-17	15	(7)
Medal record
Men's football
Representing Australia
AFF U-16 Youth Championship
Third place	2013 Myanmar	U-17 Team
- * Club domestic league appearances and goals as of 22 November 2026 ‡ National team caps and goals as of 13 February 2016

Kosta Petratos (born 1 March 1998) is an Australian professional soccer player who plays as a forward for Sydney Olympic in Australian Championship.

== Club career ==
Petratos started his youth career at the Football New South Wales National Training Centre. In 2014 he joined the FFA Centre of Excellence talent identification and player development program in Canberra, coached by Tony Vidmar, before he was signed by Perth Glory for the 2016–17 A-League season. He made 9 senior cap appearances for the Glory. Petratos signed for the Newcastle Jets for the 2017–18 A-League season to gain more game time opportunities. In 2022, Petratos departed the Jets and joined second division football club Olympias Lympion, in Cyprus.

== Personal life ==
Petratos is of Greek ancestry, and comes from a footballing family. His father Angelo played as a defender for Sydney Olympic FC, his older brother Dimitri, younger brother Maki and youngest sister Anastasia are also football players, while his younger sister Panagiota previously played for the Newcastle W-League team in 2021.
