= Jack Simmons (soccer) =

Australian association football player

Personal information
- Full name: Jack Simmons
- Date of birth: 4 April 2002 (age 24)
- Place of birth: Bathurst, New South Wales, Australia
- Position: Midfielder

Team information
- Current team: Broadmeadow Magic
- Number: 8

Youth career
- 2017–2021: Newcastle Jets

Senior career*
Years	Team	Apps	(Gls)
2017–2020	Newcastle Jets NPL	48	(9)
2018–2021	Newcastle Jets	1	(0)
2021	Broadmeadow Magic	1	(0)
2022	Dandenong Thunder	24	(2)
2023–2025	Sydney Olympic	40	(1)
2025–	Broadmeadow Magic	39	(7)

International career^{‡}
2019	Australia U17	2	(0)
Medal record
Men's football
Representing Australia
AFF U-16 Youth Championship
Third place	2017 Thailand	U-17 Team
- * Club domestic league appearances and goals as of 16 August 2026 ‡ National team caps and goals as of 26 November 2020

Jack Simmons (born 4 April 2002) is an Australian professional footballer who plays for Broadmeadow Magic as a midfielder.

== Club career ==
=== Newcastle Jets ===
Newcastle Jets awarded Simmons a scholarship contract on 28 October 2018.

On 20 April 2019 at 17 years of age, Simmons was selected into the squad with a Saturday night clash with Brisbane Roar. He made his first appearance for Newcastle Jets in a 6–1 win over Brisbane.

== International career ==
On 14 February 2019, Jack Simmons was called up for the Australian squad for the 2019 FIFA U-17 World Cup qualification.

== Career statistics ==
As of 20 April 2019

Club	Season	Division	League		Cup		Continental		Total	
Club	Season	Division	Apps	Goals	Apps	Goals	Apps	Goals	Apps	Goals
Newcastle Jets	2018–19	A-League	1	0	—		—		1	0
