= A-League transfers for 2016–17 season =

This is a list of Australian soccer transfers for the 2016–17 A-League. Only moves featuring at least one A-League club are listed.

Clubs were able to sign players at any time, but many transfers will only officially go through on 1 June because the majority of player contracts finish on 31 May.

== Transfers ==
All players without a flag are Australian. Clubs without a flag are clubs participating in the A-League.

=== Pre-season ===
| Date | Name | Moving from | Moving to |
|---|---|---|---|
| 18 December 2015 | (New Zealand) Ben Sigmund | Wellington Phoenix | Retired |
| 3 March 2016 | (Malta) Manny Muscat | Wellington Phoenix | Melbourne City |
| 8 March 2016 | (New Zealand) Kosta Barbarouses | Melbourne Victory | Wellington Phoenix |
| 24 March 2016 | (Brazil) Guilherme Finkler | Melbourne Victory | Wellington Phoenix |
| 11 April 2016 | (Senegal) Jacques Faty | Sydney FC | Central Coast Mariners |
| 5 April 2016 | (Spain) Luis García | Central Coast Mariners | Unattached |
| 11 April 2016 | (England) Daniel Heffernan | Central Coast Mariners | (Australia) Goulburn Valley Suns |
| 11 April 2016 | Francesco Stella | Central Coast Mariners | Unattached |
| 15 April 2016 | Tomislav Uskok | Central Coast Mariners | (Australia) Sydney United |
| 16 April 2016 | (Brazil) Leonardo | Newcastle Jets | Unattached |
| 16 April 2016 | (Serbia) Enver Alivodić | Newcastle Jets | Unattached |
| 16 April 2016 | Josh Barresi | Newcastle Jets | (Australia) Bulleen Lions |
| 16 April 2016 | Brandon Lundy | Newcastle Jets | Unattached |
| 16 April 2016 | Cameron Watson | Newcastle Jets | Unattached |
| 18 April 2016 | (Senegal) Mickaël Tavares | Sydney FC | Central Coast Mariners |
| 20 April 2016 | Rhys Williams | (England) Middlesbrough | Perth Glory |
| 26 April 2016 | Alex Wilkinson | Melbourne City | Sydney FC |
| 26 April 2016 | (France) Matthieu Delpierre | Melbourne Victory | Retired |
| 28 April 2016 | Devante Clut | Brisbane Roar | Newcastle Jets |
| 28 April 2016 | (Northern Ireland) Aaron Hughes | Melbourne City | Unattached |
| 28 April 2016 | James Brown | Melbourne City | (Australia) Avondale |
| 28 April 2016 | Jason Trifiro | Melbourne City | Unattached |
| 28 April 2016 | Wade Dekker | Melbourne City | Unattached |
| 28 April 2016 | Chris Herd | (England) Chesterfield | Perth Glory |
| 29 April 2016 | (Costa Rica) Jean Carlos Solórzano | Brisbane Roar | Unattached |
| 30 April 2016 | Archie Thompson | Melbourne Victory | Unattached |
| 30 April 2016 | Shane Stefanutto | Brisbane Roar | Retired |
| 1 May 2016 | (Iraq) Ali Abbas | Sydney FC | Unattached |
| 1 May 2016 | Patrick Kisnorbo | Melbourne City | Retired |
| 3 May 2016 | (Spain) Javier Hervás | Brisbane Roar | (Bosnia and Herzegovina) Željezničar Sarajevo |
| 3 May 2016 | Kye Rowles | (Australia) Palm Beach | Brisbane Roar |
| 3 May 2016 | Connor O'Toole | Adelaide United Youth | Brisbane Roar |
| 4 May 2016 | Jacob Tratt | Sydney FC | (Australia) Sydney United |
| 5 May 2016 | Craig Goodwin | Adelaide United | (Netherlands) Sparta Rotterdam |
| 5 May 2016 | Bruce Kamau | Adelaide United | Melbourne City |
| 5 May 2016 | Eli Babalj | Adelaide United | (Netherlands) AZ Alkmaar (end of loan) |
| 5 May 2016 | (Spain) Alberto | Western Sydney Wanderers | Unattached |
| 5 May 2016 | (Spain) Andreu | Western Sydney Wanderers | Unattached |
| 5 May 2016 | (Netherlands) Romeo Castelen | Western Sydney Wanderers | Unattached |
| 5 May 2016 | Golgol Mebrahtu | Western Sydney Wanderers | Unattached |
| 5 May 2016 | (Italy) Federico Piovaccari | Western Sydney Wanderers | Unattached |
| 5 May 2016 | Matt Sim | Western Sydney Wanderers | Unattached |
| 7 May 2016 | (Spain) Pablo Sánchez | Adelaide United | Unattached |
| 8 May 2016 | Ruben Zadkovich | Perth Glory | Retired |
| 8 May 2016 | (Hungary) György Sándor | Perth Glory | Unattached |
| 8 May 2016 | (Hungary) Krisztián Vadócz | Perth Glory | Unattached |
| 8 May 2016 | Diogo Ferreira | Perth Glory | Unattached |
| 8 May 2016 | Hagi Gligor | Perth Glory | Unattached |
| 10 May 2016 | (New Zealand) James McGarry | Wellington Phoenix | (New Zealand) Wellington United |
| 10 May 2016 | (New Zealand) Oliver Sail | Wellington Phoenix | (New Zealand) Wellington United |
| 10 May 2016 | (New Zealand) Justin Gulley | Wellington Phoenix | (New Zealand) Wellington United |
| 12 May 2016 | Michael Zullo | Melbourne City | Sydney FC |
| 16 May 2016 | (England) Wayne Brown | Unattached | Newcastle Jets |
| 18 May 2016 | (England) Joseph Mills | (England) Oldham Athletic | Perth Glory |
| 19 May 2016 | Jerrad Tyson | Perth Glory | Western Sydney Wanderers |
| 21 May 2016 | (Spain) Albert Riera | Wellington Phoenix | Retired |
| 23 May 2016 | Steven Lustica | Brisbane Roar | Western Sydney Wanderers |
| 23 May 2016 | Ryan Kitto | Newcastle Jets | Adelaide United |
| 23 May 2016 | Marc Marino | Melbourne City | Adelaide United |
| 26 May 2016 | Anthony Bouzanis | Sydney FC | Unattached |
| 26 May 2016 | Zac Anderson | Sydney FC | Unattached |
| 26 May 2016 | Riley Woodcock | Sydney FC | Unattached |
| 26 May 2016 | Robert Stambolziev | Sydney FC | Unattached |
| 26 May 2016 | Alex Mullen | Sydney FC | Unattached |
| 26 May 2016 | Chris Naumoff | Sydney FC | Unattached |
| 27 May 2016 | Mark Bridge | Western Sydney Wanderers | (Thailand) Chiangrai United |
| 27 May 2016 | Giancarlo Gallifuoco | Melbourne Victory | Unattached |
| 28 May 2016 | Dylan Murnane | Melbourne Victory | Unattached |
| 28 May 2016 | Anthony Kalik | Central Coast Mariners | (Croatia) Hajduk Split |
| 1 June 2016 | Alusine Fofanah | Western Sydney Wanderers | Unattached |
| 1 June 2016 | Shayne D'Cunha | Western Sydney Wanderers | Unattached |
| 1 June 2016 | Daniel Alessi | Western Sydney Wanderers | Newcastle Jets |
| 2 June 2016 | Nick Feely | Unattached | Perth Glory |
| 7 June 2016 | Ivan Necevski | Sydney FC | Central Coast Mariners |
| 10 June 2016 | Daniel Arzani | Unattached | Melbourne City |
| 10 June 2016 | Luke Brattan | (England) Manchester City | Melbourne City (loan) |
| 11 June 2016 | James Donachie | Brisbane Roar | Melbourne Victory |
| 16 June 2016 | (Brazil) Henrique | Brisbane Roar | (Malaysia) Negeri Sembilan |
| 16 June 2016 | Ben Garuccio | Melbourne City | Adelaide United |
| 17 June 2016 | Mitch Austin | Central Coast Mariners | Melbourne Victory |
| 17 June 2016 | Connor Pain | Melbourne Victory | Central Coast Mariners |
| 21 June 2016 | Andrew Hoole | Sydney FC | Newcastle Jets |
| 22 June 2016 | (Martinique) Harry Novillo | Melbourne City | (Turkey) Manisaspor |
| 22 June 2016 | Troy Danaskos | Wellington Phoenix | Unattached |
| 23 June 2016 | Dario Vidošić | Western Sydney Wanderers | (China) Liaoning Whowin |
| 24 June 2016 | Liam Reddy | Western Sydney Wanderers | Perth Glory |
| 24 June 2016 | Ante Covic | Perth Glory | Unattached |
| 24 June 2016 | Jack Duncan | Unattached | Newcastle Jets |
| 27 June 2016 | Thomas Deng | Melbourne Victory | (Netherlands) Jong PSV (loan) |
| 29 June 2016 | (Uruguay) Bruno Piñatares | (Uruguay) Cerro | Western Sydney Wanderers |
| 30 June 2016 | Aaron Mooy | Melbourne City | (England) Manchester City |
| 1 July 2016 | Brandon Wilson | (England) Burnley | Perth Glory |
| 4 July 2016 | (Croatia) Ivan Vujica | Unattached | Newcastle Jets |
| 5 July 2016 | (Spain) Aritz Borda | Unattached | Western Sydney Wanderers |
| 7 July 2016 | Ruon Tongyik | Adelaide United | Melbourne City |
| 9 July 2016 | Jacob Pepper | Western Sydney Wanderers | Brisbane Roar |
| 11 July 2016 | (Spain) Alan Baró | Unattached | Melbourne Victory |
| 11 July 2016 | Jesse Makarounas | Melbourne Victory | Adelaide United |
| 12 July 2016 | (New Zealand) Shane Smeltz | Sydney FC | (Malaysia) Kedah FA |
| 12 July 2016 | Joshua Brillante | (Italy) Fiorentina | Sydney FC |
| 14 July 2016 | Blake Powell | Wellington Phoenix | Central Coast Mariners |
| 14 July 2016 | Kwabena Appiah | Wellington Phoenix | Central Coast Mariners |
| 14 July 2016 | Robert Cornthwaite | Unattached | Western Sydney Wanderers |
| 14 July 2016 | (Japan) Jumpei Kusukami | (Japan) Sagan Tosu | Western Sydney Wanderers |
| 15 July 2016 | (Spain) Corona | Brisbane Roar | (Spain) Almería |
| 15 July 2016 | Mark Birighitti | Newcastle Jets | Unattached |
| 19 July 2016 | Neil Kilkenny | Unattached | Melbourne City |
| 19 July 2016 | Andrew Nabbout | Unattached | Newcastle Jets |
| 19 July 2016 | Danny Vukovic | Melbourne Victory | Sydney FC |
| 19 July 2016 | Stefan Mauk | Adelaide United | (Netherlands) NEC |
| 21 July 2016 | Bernie Ibini | (Belgium) Club Brugge | Sydney FC (loan) |
| 24 July 2016 | Rostyn Griffiths | Unattached | Perth Glory |
| 26 July 2016 | (Argentina) Fernando Brandán | (Argentina) Atlético Temperley | Melbourne City (loan) |
| 26 July 2016 | Bruce Djite | Adelaide United | (South Korea) Suwon FC |
| 27 July 2016 | (Denmark) Thomas Kristensen | (Netherlands) ADO Den Haag | Brisbane Roar |
| 27 July 2016 | Chris Herd | Perth Glory | Unattached |
| 1 August 2016 | James Troisi | Unattached | Melbourne Victory |
| 5 August 2016 | Joey Katebian | Melbourne Victory | Brisbane Roar |
| 6 August 2016 | (Finland) Aleksandr Kokko | (Finland) RoPS | Newcastle Jets |
| 9 August 2016 | (Italy) Marco Rossi | (Italy) Perugia | Wellington Phoenix |
| 9 August 2016 | (Serbia) Milan Smiljanić | (Israel) Maccabi Netanya | Perth Glory |
| 11 August 2016 | Tim Cahill | Unattached | Melbourne City |
| 11 August 2016 | Joshua Rose | Central Coast Mariners | Melbourne City |
| 11 August 2016 | Scott Jamieson | Western Sydney Wanderers | (Sweden) IFK Göteborg |
| 12 August 2016 | Jack Clisby | Melbourne City | Western Sydney Wanderers |
| 12 August 2016 | Jacob Melling | Melbourne City | Western Sydney Wanderers |
| 15 August 2016 | (Germany) Jérome Polenz | Brisbane Roar | Unattached |
| 19 August 2016 | Adam Parkhouse | (Australia) Manly United | Wellington Phoenix |
| 22 August 2016 | (Brazil) Bobô | (Brazil) Grêmio | Sydney FC |
| 24 August 2016 | Kerem Bulut | Unattached | Western Sydney Wanderers |
| 25 August 2016 | (New Zealand) Marco Rojas | Unattached | Melbourne Victory |
| 27 August 2016 | (Brazil) Henrique | Unattached | Adelaide United |
| 30 August 2016 | Joel Chianese | Unattached | Perth Glory |
| 30 August 2016 | Nikola Mileusnic | (Australia) Adelaide City | Adelaide United |
| 1 September 2016 | (Denmark) Michael Jakobsen | (Denmark) Esbjerg | Melbourne City |
| 1 September 2016 | Brett Holman | Unattached | Brisbane Roar |
| 5 September 2016 | (Argentina) Nicolás Colazo | (Argentina) Boca Juniors | Melbourne City (loan) |
| 6 September 2016 | Braedyn Crowley | (Australia) Northcote City | Melbourne City |
| 6 September 2016 | (Argentina) Nicolás Martínez | (Greece) Olympiacos | Western Sydney Wanderers (loan) |
| 14 September 2016 | (Spain) Sergi Guardiola | (Spain) Granada | Adelaide United (loan) |
| 18 September 2016 | Jacob Tratt | (Australia) Sydney United | Wellington Phoenix |
| 21 September 2016 | James Holland | Unattached | Adelaide United |
| 23 September 2016 | Alastair Bray | Central Coast Mariners | Melbourne Victory |
| 28 September 2016 | Emilio Martinez | (England) Nike Academy | Western Sydney Wanderers |
| 30 September 2016 | Ryan Lowry | (Australia) ECU Joondalup | Wellington Phoenix |
| 30 September 2016 | (Spain) Manuel Arana | Unattached | Brisbane Roar |
| 4 October 2016 | (South Korea) Danny Choi | (Australia) Blacktown City | Adelaide United |
| 4 October 2016 | Riley Woodcock | (Australia) Cockburn City | Sydney FC |

=== Mid-season ===
| Date | Name | Moving from | Moving to |
|---|---|---|---|
| 12 October 2016 | Taylor Regan | Unattached | Adelaide United |
| 13 October 2016 | Ben Litfin | (Australia) Gold Coast City | Wellington Phoenix |
| 13 October 2016 | Nikolai Topor-Stanley | Western Sydney Wanderers | (United Arab Emirates) Hatta Club |
| 18 October 2016 | (Germany) Maximilian Beister | (Germany) Mainz 05 | Melbourne Victory (loan) |
| 19 October 2016 | Scott Galloway | Melbourne Victory | Central Coast Mariners |
| 22 October 2016 | Johnny Koutroumbis | Adelaide United | Newcastle Jets |
| 26 October 2016 | (China) Ma Leilei | Unattached | Newcastle Jets |
| 5 November 2016 | Jim Fogarty | (Australia) Edgeworth FC | Newcastle Jets |
| 8 November 2016 | (South Korea) Danny Choi | Adelaide United | Unattached |
| 17 November 2016 | Jim Fogarty | Newcastle Jets | Unattached |
| 18 November 2016 | Iain Fyfe | (Australia) Campbelltown City | Newcastle Jets |
| 25 November 2016 | Matt Acton | Unattached | Melbourne Victory |
| 26 November 2016 | Chris Oldfield | (Australia) Avondale | Sydney FC |
| 26 November 2016 | Sebastian Pasquali | Melbourne Victory | (Netherlands) Jong Ajax |
| 1 December 2016 | Tom Heward-Belle | Central Coast Mariners | Unattached |
| 8 December 2016 | Iain Fyfe | Newcastle Jets | Unattached |
| 12 December 2016 | Radovan Pavicevic | Newcastle Jets | Unattached |
| 19 December 2016 | (New Zealand) Shane Smeltz | Unattached | Wellington Phoenix |
| 20 December 2016 | Vedran Janjetović | Sydney FC | Western Sydney Wanderers |
| 20 December 2016 | Chris Oldfield | Sydney FC | Unattached |
| 28 December 2016 | Kerem Bulut | Western Sydney Wanderers | Unattached |
| 30 December 2016 | Terry Antonis | (Greece) PAOK | Western Sydney Wanderers (loan) |
| 2 January 2017 | Andrew Redmayne | Western Sydney Wanderers | Sydney FC |
| 2 January 2017 | Matt Jurman | Sydney FC | (South Korea) Suwon Samsung Bluewings |
| 4 January 2017 | Mitch Cooper | Newcastle Jets | Unattached |
| 12 January 2017 | James Holland | Adelaide United | Unattached |
| 13 January 2017 | (Netherlands) Jordy Buijs | Unattached | Sydney FC |
| 14 January 2017 | Matthew Fletcher | Central Coast Mariners | Unattached |
| 14 January 2017 | (Papua New Guinea) Brad McDonald | Central Coast Mariners | Unattached |
| 14 January 2017 | Tomislav Arčaba | Unattached | Newcastle Jets |
| 15 January 2017 | Ben Litfin | Wellington Phoenix | Unattached |
| 19 January 2017 | Andy Brennan | Newcastle Jets | Unattached |
| 20 January 2017 | Joel Allwright | Unattached | Newcastle Jets |
| 23 January 2017 | Connor Chapman | Melbourne City | (South Korea) Incheon United |
| 25 January 2017 | (Spain) Sergi Guardiola | Adelaide United | (Spain) Granada (end of loan) |
| 27 January 2017 | Ryan Griffiths | (Hong Kong) South China | Western Sydney Wanderers |
| 31 January 2017 | (Brazil) Henrique | Adelaide United | (Thailand) Chiangrai United |
| 1 February 2017 | Stefan Zinni | (Australia) South Melbourne | Western Sydney Wanderers |
| 2 February 2017 | (Germany) Maximilian Beister | Melbourne Victory | (Germany) Mainz 05 (end of loan) |
| 6 February 2017 | Dimitri Petratos | Brisbane Roar | (South Korea) Ulsan Hyundai |
| 7 February 2017 | (South Korea) Kim Jae-sung | (South Korea) Seoul E-Land | Adelaide United |
| 7 February 2017 | Eli Babalj | Unattached | Adelaide United |
| 7 February 2017 | (Senegal) Baba Diawara | Unattached | Adelaide United |
| 14 February 2017 | (Greece) Avraam Papadopoulos | Unattached | Brisbane Roar |
| 16 February 2017 | (Serbia) Milan Smiljanić | Perth Glory | Unattached |
| 22 February 2017 | Riley Woodcock | Sydney FC | Unattached |
| 16 March 2017 | Oliver Bozanic | Melbourne Victory | (Japan) Ventforet Kofu |
| 21 March 2017 | (Romania) Lucian Goian | Unattached | Perth Glory |
| 9 April 2017 | (New Zealand) Shane Smeltz | Wellington Phoenix | (Indonesia) Pusamania Borneo |
| 11 April 2017 | Jacob Tratt | Wellington Phoenix | Unattached |

Player was released to free agency before joining new club
