= A-League transfers for 2017–18 season =

This is a list of Australian soccer transfers for the 2017–18 A-League. Only moves featuring at least one A-League club are listed.

Clubs were able to sign players at any time, but many transfers will only officially go through on 1 June because the majority of player contracts finish on 31 May.

== Transfers ==
All players without a flag are Australian. Clubs without a flag are clubs participating in the A-League.

=== Pre-season ===
Date	Name	Moving from	Moving to
25 January 2017	Kosta Petratos	Perth Glory	Newcastle Jets
30 March 2017	(North Macedonia) Daniel Georgievski	Melbourne Victory	Newcastle Jets
5 April 2017	Mario Shabow	Western Sydney Wanderers	Newcastle Jets
14 April 2017	Joel Allwright	Newcastle Jets	(Australia) Adelaide City
19 April 2017	(Germany) Thomas Broich	Brisbane Roar	Unattached
19 April 2017	(Republic of Ireland) Roy O'Donovan	Central Coast Mariners	Newcastle Jets
19 April 2017	Paul Izzo	Central Coast Mariners	Adelaide United
20 April 2017	Ivan Necevski	Central Coast Mariners	Unattached
21 April 2017	(Portugal) Fábio Ferreira	Central Coast Mariners	(Malaysia) PKNS
25 April 2017	Scott Neville	Western Sydney Wanderers	Perth Glory
1 May 2017	Steve Kuzmanovski	Melbourne City	Unattached
1 May 2017	(Argentina) Nicolás Colazo	Melbourne City	(Argentina) Boca Juniors (end of loan)
9 May 2017	Shannon Cole	Western Sydney Wanderers	Unattached
9 May 2017	Bernie Ibini	Sydney FC	(Belgium) Club Brugge (end of loan)
9 May 2017	Brandon Borrello	Brisbane Roar	(Germany) 1. FC Kaiserslautern
10 May 2017	Rashid Mahazi	Melbourne Victory	Retired
10 May 2017	Labinot Haliti	Newcastle Jets	Unattached
10 May 2017	(Croatia) Mateo Poljak	Newcastle Jets	Unattached
10 May 2017	(Denmark) Morten Nordstrand	Newcastle Jets	Unattached
10 May 2017	Tomislav Arčaba	Newcastle Jets	Unattached
10 May 2017	(China) Ma Leilei	Newcastle Jets	Unattached
10 May 2017	Harry Sawyer	Newcastle Jets	Unattached
11 May 2017	(Spain) Dimas	Western Sydney Wanderers	Unattached
11 May 2017	(Uruguay) Bruno Piñatares	Western Sydney Wanderers	Unattached
11 May 2017	Ryan Griffiths	Western Sydney Wanderers	Unattached
11 May 2017	Liam Youlley	Western Sydney Wanderers	Unattached
11 May 2017	Stefan Zinni	Western Sydney Wanderers	Unattached
11 May 2017	(Argentina) Nicolás Martínez	Western Sydney Wanderers	(Greece) Olympiacos (end of loan)
11 May 2017	Terry Antonis	Western Sydney Wanderers	(Greece) PAOK (end of loan)
12 May 2017	Nick Ansell	Melbourne Victory	Unattached
12 May 2017	George Howard	Melbourne Victory	Unattached
12 May 2017	Alastair Bray	Melbourne Victory	Unattached
12 May 2017	Lucas Spinella	Melbourne Victory	Unattached
12 May 2017	(Scotland) Nick Montgomery	Central Coast Mariners	(Australia) Wollongong Wolves
14 May 2017	Richard Garcia	Perth Glory	Retired
14 May 2017	Dino Djulbic	Perth Glory	Unattached
14 May 2017	(Serbia) Nebojša Marinković	Perth Glory	Unattached
14 May 2017	Mitchell Oxborrow	Perth Glory	Unattached
14 May 2017	Aryn Williams	Perth Glory	Unattached
14 May 2017	(Romania) Lucian Goian	Perth Glory	Unattached
14 May 2017	Jordan Thurtell	Perth Glory	Unattached
14 May 2017	Jacob Poscoliero	Central Coast Mariners	Perth Glory
15 May 2017	(New Zealand) Glen Moss	Wellington Phoenix	Newcastle Jets
15 May 2017	Rhys Williams	Perth Glory	Melbourne Victory
15 May 2017	Thomas Deng	(Netherlands) Jong PSV	Melbourne Victory (end of loan)
16 May 2017	Josh Risdon	Perth Glory	Western Sydney Wanderers
16 May 2017	(Curaçao) Roly Bonevacia	Wellington Phoenix	Western Sydney Wanderers
16 May 2017	Michael Thwaite	Unattached	Western Sydney Wanderers
16 May 2017	Dylan McGowan	Adelaide United	(Portugal) Paços de Ferreira
16 May 2017	Jamie Maclaren	Brisbane Roar	Unattached
17 May 2017	(Spain) Sergio Cirio	Adelaide United	Unattached
17 May 2017	George Mells	Adelaide United	Unattached
17 May 2017	Jesse Makarounas	Adelaide United	Unattached
17 May 2017	(Spain) Manuel Arana	Brisbane Roar	Unattached
17 May 2017	Cameron Crestani	Brisbane Roar	Unattached
17 May 2017	Joey Katebian	Brisbane Roar	Unattached
17 May 2017	Lewis Italiano	Wellington Phoenix	(Australia) Bulleen Lions
19 May 2017	(Senegal) Mickaël Tavares	Central Coast Mariners	Unattached
19 May 2017	(Senegal) Jacques Faty	Central Coast Mariners	Unattached
22 May 2017	(Slovakia) Filip Hološko	Sydney FC	Unattached
22 May 2017	John Hall	Adelaide United	Western Sydney Wanderers
23 May 2017	(Netherlands) Tom Hiariej	(Netherlands) FC Groningen	Central Coast Mariners
26 May 2017	(Tunisia) Fahid Ben Khalfallah	Melbourne Victory	Brisbane Roar
28 May 2017	(Spain) Alan Baró	Melbourne Victory	Central Coast Mariners
29 May 2017	Kristian Brymora	Newcastle Jets	Unattached
30 May 2017	Antony Golec	Unattached	Central Coast Mariners
31 May 2017	Andrew Hoole	Newcastle Jets	Central Coast Mariners
2 June 2017	Nathan Konstandopoulos	Brisbane Roar	Adelaide United
4 June 2017	George Timotheou	Sydney FC	(Australia) Sydney Olympic
6 June 2017	(Spain) Alex Rodriguez	Wellington Phoenix	(Portugal) Boavista
10 June 2017	Lewis Italiano	(Australia) Bulleen Lions	Wellington Phoenix
13 June 2017	(New Zealand) Kosta Barbarouses	Wellington Phoenix	Melbourne Victory
13 June 2017	Dimitri Petratos	Unattached	Newcastle Jets
13 June 2017	Nikolai Topor-Stanley	Unattached	Newcastle Jets
14 June 2017	Jackson Bandiera	Western Sydney Wanderers	Unattached
16 June 2017	Eugene Galekovic	Adelaide United	Melbourne City
19 June 2017	Tommy Oar	Brisbane Roar	(Cyprus) APOEL
21 June 2017	Danny Vukovic	Sydney FC	(Belgium) Genk
21 June 2017	Bai Antoniou	Sydney FC	Unattached
22 June 2017	Ben Kennedy	Newcastle Jets	Central Coast Mariners
22 June 2017	Paulo Retre	Melbourne City	Sydney FC
23 June 2017	Mitch Nichols	Western Sydney Wanderers	Perth Glory
23 June 2017	Michael Neill	Central Coast Mariners	(Australia) Sydney United
26 June 2017	Kye Rowles	Brisbane Roar	Central Coast Mariners
27 June 2017	(South Korea) Kim Jae-sung	Adelaide United	(South Korea) Jeonnam Dragons
29 June 2017	Scott Galloway	Central Coast Mariners	Wellington Phoenix
30 June 2017	(Serbia) Miloš Dimitrijević	Sydney FC	Unattached
3 July 2017	Scott Jamieson	(Sweden) IFK Göteborg	Melbourne City
3 July 2017	Joshua Rose	Melbourne City	Central Coast Mariners
4 July 2017	Corey Gameiro	Melbourne City	Brisbane Roar
4 July 2017	Riley McGree	Adelaide United	(Belgium) Club Brugge
5 July 2017	(Spain) Oriol Riera	Unattached	Western Sydney Wanderers
6 July 2017	George Blackwood	Sydney FC	Adelaide United
7 July 2017	Daniel De Silva	Unattached	Central Coast Mariners
7 July 2017	Marc Marino	Adelaide United	(Australia) Campbelltown City
10 July 2017	(Finland) Aleksandr Kokko	Newcastle Jets	(Hong Kong) Eastern
13 July 2017	Marc Tokich	(Australia) FFA Centre of Excellence	Western Sydney Wanderers
13 July 2017	Chris Herd	Unattached	Western Sydney Wanderers
15 July 2017	(Italy) Iacopo La Rocca	Adelaide United	Melbourne City
17 July 2017	(Turkey) Ersan Gülüm	Hebei China Fortune	Adelaide United (loan)
17 July 2017	(Italy) Massimo Maccarone	Unattached	Brisbane Roar
18 July 2017	(Denmark) Johan Absalonsen	Unattached	Adelaide United
18 July 2017	Mark Bridge	Unattached	Western Sydney Wanderers
18 July 2017	John Roberts	(Australia) FFA Centre of Excellence	Melbourne City
18 July 2017	Ramy Najjarine	Western Sydney Wanderers	Melbourne City
19 July 2017	Ivan Franjic	Melbourne City	(South Korea) Daegu FC
20 July 2017	(Croatia) Goran Paracki	(Croatia) Istra 1961	Wellington Phoenix
24 July 2017	(Spain) Álvaro Cejudo	Unattached	Western Sydney Wanderers
25 July 2017	(Denmark) Thomas Sørensen	Melbourne City	Retired
26 July 2017	Tom Glover	(England) Tottenham Hotspur	Central Coast Mariners (loan)
26 July 2017	Stefan Mauk	(Netherlands) NEC	Melbourne City (loan)
26 July 2017	Jake Adelson	Central Coast Mariners	Newcastle Jets
26 July 2017	(New Zealand) Marco Rojas	Melbourne Victory	(Netherlands) Heerenveen
27 July 2017	Alex Cisak	Unattached	Sydney FC
28 July 2017	(Spain) Asdrúbal	Unattached	Central Coast Mariners
28 July 2017	Luke Wilkshire	Unattached	Sydney FC
29 July 2017	(Spain) Aritz Borda	Western Sydney Wanderers	Unattached
29 July 2017	(Netherlands) Wout Brama	(Netherlands) Utrecht	Central Coast Mariners
29 July 2017	Anthony Cáceres	Melbourne City	(England) Manchester City (end of loan)
30 July 2017	Eli Babalj	Adelaide United	Unattached
31 July 2017	Mark Milligan	Unattached	Melbourne Victory
31 July 2017	Jake Brimmer	Unattached	Perth Glory
1 August 2017	Rostyn Griffiths	Perth Glory	(Uzbekistan) Pakhtakor Tashkent
3 August 2017	Vince Lia	Wellington Phoenix	Adelaide United
4 August 2017	Mitchell Oxborrow	(Australia) Broadmeadow Magic	Brisbane Roar
4 August 2017	Dario Vidošić	Unattached	Wellington Phoenix
6 August 2017	Emilio Martinez	Western Sydney Wanderers	Brisbane Roar
9 August 2017	(Spain) Andreu	Unattached	Perth Glory
9 August 2017	Daniel Mullen	Newcastle Jets	Wellington Phoenix
9 August 2017	Peter Skapetis	Unattached	Brisbane Roar
12 August 2017	(Poland) Adrian Mierzejewski	Unattached	Sydney FC
16 August 2017	(Serbia) Andrija Kaluđerović	Unattached	Wellington Phoenix
16 August 2017	(Algeria) Karim Matmour	Unattached	Adelaide United
16 August 2017	(Argentina) Matías Sánchez	(Argentina) Temperley	Melbourne Victory
21 August 2017	(Netherlands) Bart Schenkeveld	(Netherlands) PEC Zwolle	Melbourne City
23 August 2017	(Iraq) Ali Abbas	Unattached	Wellington Phoenix
25 August 2017	(Spain) Xavi Torres	Unattached	Perth Glory
28 August 2017	(Spain) Raúl Llorente	(Greece) Platanias	Western Sydney Wanderers
1 September 2017	Anthony Kalik	(Croatia) Hajduk Split	Sydney FC (loan)
9 September 2017	(France) Éric Bauthéac	Unattached	Brisbane Roar
12 September 2017	(Argentina) Marcelo Carrusca	Adelaide United	Melbourne City
12 September 2017	(New Zealand) Louis Fenton	Wellington Phoenix	(New Zealand) Team Wellington
16 September 2017	(Venezuela) Ronald Vargas	(Greece) AEK Athens	Newcastle Jets
16 September 2017	(Netherlands) Leroy George	Unattached	Melbourne Victory
18 September 2017	(Poland) Marcin Budziński	(Poland) Cracovia	Melbourne City
23 September 2017	(Germany) Daniel Adlung	Unattached	Adelaide United
29 September 2017	(Scotland) Ross McCormack	(England) Aston Villa	Melbourne City (loan)

=== Mid-season ===
Date	Name	Moving from	Moving to
11 October 2017	Mitchell Mallia	(Australia) Blacktown City	Perth Glory (loan)
11 October 2017	Jeremy Walker	(Australia) Green Gully	Perth Glory
11 October 2017	Ivan Necevski	Unattached	Newcastle Jets
13 October 2017	Kenny Athiu	(Australia) Heidelberg United	Melbourne Victory (loan)
18 October 2017	Bryce Bafford	(Australia) Australian Institute of Sport	Brisbane Roar
18 October 2017	Jay Barnett	(Australia) Australian Institute of Sport	Brisbane Roar
4 November 2017	Brendan White	(Australia) Port Melbourne	Brisbane Roar
9 November 2017	Ivan Franjic	Unattached	Brisbane Roar
28 November 2017	Harrison Delbridge	(United States) FC Cincinnati	Melbourne City
5 December 2017	(Algeria) Karim Matmour	Adelaide United	Unattached
6 December 2017	Tim Cahill	Melbourne City	Unattached
8 December 2017	(Brazil) Guilherme Finkler	Wellington Phoenix	Unattached
18 December 2017	(Argentina) Fernando Brandán	Melbourne City	(Argentina) Temperley (end of loan)
19 December 2017	Mitchell Mallia	Perth Glory	(Australia) Blacktown City (end of loan)
20 December 2017	Riley McGree	(Belgium) Club Brugge	Newcastle Jets (loan)
22 December 2017	(Argentina) Patito Rodríguez	Unattached	Newcastle Jets
29 December 2017	Dario Vidošić	Wellington Phoenix	Melbourne City
30 December 2017	Nathan Burns	(Japan) Sanfrecce Hiroshima	Wellington Phoenix
2 January 2018	(Japan) Jumpei Kusukami	Western Sydney Wanderers	Unattached
3 January 2018	Terry Antonis	Unattached	Melbourne Victory
3 January 2018	Dino Djulbic	Unattached	Melbourne Victory
3 January 2018	Jacob Melling	Western Sydney Wanderers	Central Coast Mariners
4 January 2018	John Roberts	Melbourne City	Western Sydney Wanderers
9 January 2018	(Serbia) Matija Ljujić	Unattached	Wellington Phoenix
9 January 2018	John Hall	Western Sydney Wanderers	Unattached
11 January 2018	(Argentina) Marcelo Carrusca	Melbourne City	Western Sydney Wanderers
16 January 2018	Robert Cornthwaite	Western Sydney Wanderers	(Malaysia) Perak
17 January 2018	Sebastian Ryall	Sydney FC	Unattached
18 January 2018	Harry Ascroft	Central Coast Mariners	(Malta) Balzan
18 January 2018	Peter Skapetis	Brisbane Roar	Central Coast Mariners
19 January 2018	(Spain) Asdrúbal	Central Coast Mariners	Unattached
22 January 2018	Dino Djulbic	Melbourne Victory	Perth Glory
24 January 2018	(New Zealand) Hamish Watson	Wellington Phoenix	Unattached
25 January 2018	Neil Kilkenny	Melbourne City	Perth Glory
25 January 2018	(Scotland) Ross McCormack	Melbourne City	(England) Aston Villa (end of loan)
28 January 2018	Mark Milligan	Melbourne Victory	(Saudi Arabia) Al-Ahli
31 January 2018	Kwabena Appiah	Central Coast Mariners	(South Korea) Incheon United
31 January 2018	(Iraq) Ali Abbas	Wellington Phoenix	Unattached
31 January 2018	Ben Warland	Adelaide United	Sydney FC
31 January 2018	Jacob Poscoliero	Perth Glory	Central Coast Mariners
31 January 2018	Chris Ikonomidis	(Italy) Lazio	Western Sydney Wanderers (loan)
31 January 2018	(New Zealand) Monty Patterson	(England) Ipswich Town	Wellington Phoenix (loan)
1 February 2018	Tando Velaphi	Unattached	Wellington Phoenix
2 February 2018	(Portugal) Fábio Ferreira	Unattached	Sydney FC
6 February 2018	(Slovenia) Džengis Čavušević	Unattached	Adelaide United
9 February 2018	Devante Clut	Newcastle Jets	(Australia) Blacktown City
10 February 2018	Oliver Bozanic	Unattached	Melbourne City
13 February 2018	Braedyn Crowley	Melbourne City	Unattached
13 February 2018	Moudi Najjar	Western Sydney Wanderers	Melbourne City
19 February 2018	Daniel Alessi	Newcastle Jets	(Australia) Manly United
20 February 2018	Mitch Nichols	Perth Glory	Unattached
20 February 2018	Marc Warren	Perth Glory	Unattached
22 February 2018	(Brazil) Henrique	Unattached	Brisbane Roar
3 March 2018	Jason Geria	Melbourne Victory	(Japan) JEF United Chiba
5 March 2018	Andrew Nabbout	Newcastle Jets	(Japan) Urawa Red Diamonds
27 March 2018	Michael Theo	Brisbane Roar	Unattached
12 April 2018	Chris Herd	Western Sydney Wanderers	Unattached
12 April 2018	Jerrad Tyson	Western Sydney Wanderers	Unattached
3 May 2018	Ivan Necevski	Unattached	Newcastle Jets

Player was released to free agency before joining new club
