= 2017–18 Newcastle Jets FC season =

Newcastle Jets
2017–18 season
- Chairman: Martin Lee
- Manager: Ernie Merrick
- Stadium: McDonald Jones Stadium, Newcastle
- A-League: 2nd
- A-League Finals Series: Runners-up
- FFA Cup: Round of 32
- Top goalscorer: Andrew Nabbout, Dimitri Petratos (10 goals)
- Highest home attendance: 18,156 vs Sydney FC (3 March 2018)
- Lowest home attendance: 6,258 vs Wellington Phoenix (4 November 2017)
- Average home league attendance: 11,016
Home colours	Away colours

The 2017–18 Newcastle Jets FC season was the club's 17th season since its establishment in 2000. The club participated in the A-League for the 13th time and the FFA Cup for the 4th time.

== Players ==
=== Squad information ===
Note: Flags indicate national team as defined under FIFA eligibility rules; some limited exceptions apply. Players may hold more than one non-FIFA nationality.

No.	Pos.	Nation	Player
1	GK	AUS	Jack Duncan
3	DF	AUS	Jason Hoffman
4	DF	AUS	Nigel Boogaard (Captain)
5	MF	AUS	Ben Kantarovski
6	MF	AUS	Steven Ugarkovic
7	FW	AUS	Dimitri Petratos
8	FW	VEN	Ronald Vargas
9	FW	IRL	Roy O'Donovan
10	MF	ENG	Wayne Brown
11	FW	ARG	Patito Rodríguez (Injury replacement)
12	FW	AUS	Mario Shabow
13	DF	CRO	Ivan Vujica
16	DF	AUS	Nick Cowburn

No.	Pos.	Nation	Player
17	DF	MKD	Daniel Georgievski
18	MF	AUS	John Koutroumbis
19	FW	AUS	Kosta Petratos
20	GK	NZL	Glen Moss
22	DF	AUS	Lachlan Jackson
24	MF	AUS	Joe Champness (Scholarship)
27	MF	AUS	Riley McGree (Injury replacement, on loan from Club Brugge)
28	DF	AUS	Patrick Langlois (Scholarship)
29	DF	AUS	Jake Adelson
30	GK	AUS	Ivan Necevski
32	MF	AUS	Angus Thurgate (Scholarship)
44	DF	AUS	Nikolai Topor-Stanley

=== From youth squad ===
N	Pos.	Nat.	Name	Age	Notes
24	MF	(Australia)	Joe Champness	20	1 year scholarship contract, followed by 2 year senior contract
28	DF	(Australia)	Patrick Langlois	17	1.5 year scholarship contract
32	MF	(Australia)	Angus Thurgate	18	1.5 year scholarship contract

=== Transfers in ===
No.	Position	Player	Transferred from	Type/fee	Contract length	Date	Ref
19	FW	Kosta Petratos	Perth Glory	Free transfer	1 year	24 January 2017	
17	DF	(North Macedonia) Daniel Georgievski	Melbourne Victory	Free transfer	2 years	30 March 2017	
12	FW	Mario Shabow	Western Sydney Wanderers	Free transfer	2 years	5 April 2017	
9	FW	(Republic of Ireland) Roy O'Donovan	Central Coast Mariners	Free transfer	2 years	19 April 2017	
20	GK	(New Zealand) Glen Moss	Wellington Phoenix	Free transfer	1 year	15 May 2017	
7	FW	Dimitri Petratos		Free transfer	2 years	13 June 2017	
44	DF	Nikolai Topor-Stanley		Free transfer	2 years	14 June 2017	
29	DF	Jake Adelson		Free transfer	2 years	26 July 2017	
8	FW	(Venezuela) Ronald Vargas	(Greece) AEK Athens	Free transfer	1 year	16 September 2017	
30	GK	Ivan Necevski		Replacement contract		11 October 2017	
27	MF	Riley McGree	(Belgium) Club Brugge	Injury replacement loan	6 months	20 December 2017	
11	FW	(Argentina) Patito Rodríguez		Injury replacement	6 months	22 December 2017	
30	GK	Ivan Necevski		Replacement contract	1 match	3 May 2018	

=== Transfers out ===
No.	Position	Player	Transferred to	Type/fee	Date	Ref
1	GK	Ben Kennedy	Central Coast Mariners	Free transfer	31 March 2017	
29	MF	Joel Allwright	(Australia) Adelaide City	Free transfer	14 April 2017	
2	DF	Daniel Mullen		End of contract	10 May 2017	
7	MF	Andrew Hoole		End of contract	10 May 2017	
8	MF	(Croatia) Mateo Poljak		End of contract	10 May 2017	
11	FW	Labinot Haliti		End of contract	10 May 2017	
12	FW	Harry Sawyer		End of contract	10 May 2017	
18	MF	(China) Ma Leilei		End of contract	10 May 2017	
19	FW	(Denmark) Morten Nordstrand		End of contract	10 May 2017	
50	GK	Tomislav Arčaba		End of contract	10 May 2017	
24	FW	Kristian Brymora		End of contract	29 May 2017	
9	FW	(Finland) Aleksandr Kokko	(Hong Kong) Eastern Sports Club	Free transfer	10 July 2017	
23	MF	Devante Clut	(Australia) Blacktown City	Mutual contract termination	9 February 2018	
21	DF	Daniel Alessi	(Australia) Manly United	Mutual contract termination	19 February 2018	
15	FW	Andrew Nabbout	(Japan) Urawa Red Diamonds	$500,000	5 March 2018	

=== Contract extensions ===
No.	Name	Position	Duration	Date	Notes
5	Ben Kantarovski	Central midfielder	1 year	19 May 2017	
1	Jack Duncan	Goalkeeper	1 year	23 May 2017	
13	(Croatia) Ivan Vujica	Left back	2 years	29 October 2017	
15	Andrew Nabbout	Forward	2 years	27 November 2017	
20	(New Zealand) Glen Moss	Goalkeeper	1 year	23 January 2018	
5	Ben Kantarovski	Central midfielder	2 years	1 February 2018	
3	Jason Hoffman	Right back	1 year	14 February 2018	
16	Nick Cowburn	Right back	1 year	14 February 2018	
4	Nigel Boogaard	Centre back	1 year	18 April 2018	

== Technical staff ==
Position	Name
Head coach	(Scotland) Ernie Merrick
Assistant coach	(Australia) Clayton Zane
Youth coach	(Australia) Lawrie McKinna
Assistant Youth Coach	(Australia) Labinot Haliti
Goalkeeping coach	(Australia) Chris Bowling
Physiotherapist	(Australia) Justin Dougherty

== Statistics ==
=== Squad statistics ===
N	Pos.	Nat.	Name	Total					A-League					A-League Finals Series					FFA Cup
N	Pos.	Nat.	Name	Apps	Goals	Yellow card	Second yellow card	Red card	Apps	Goals	Yellow card	Second yellow card	Red card	Apps	Goals	Yellow card	Second yellow card	Red card	Apps	Goals	Yellow card	Second yellow card	Red card
1	GK	(Australia)	Jack Duncan	20	0	0	0	0	18+0	0	0	0	0	1+0	0	0	0	0	1+0	0	0	0	0
3	DF	(Australia)	Jason Hoffman	26	6	7	1	0	21+2	5	5	1	0	2+0	1	2	0	0	1+0	0	0	0	0
4	DF	(Australia)	Nigel Boogaard	24	1	2	0	0	21+0	1	2	0	0	2+0	0	0	0	0	1+0	0	0	0	0
5	MF	(Australia)	Ben Kantarovski	22	5	5	0	0	19+2	5	5	0	0	0+0	0	0	0	0	1+0	0	0	0	0
6	MF	(Australia)	Steven Ugarkovic	29	1	4	0	0	26+0	1	2	0	0	2+0	0	1	0	0	1+0	0	1	0	0
7	FW	(Australia)	Dimitri Petratos	28	10	5	0	0	25+0	10	3	0	0	2+0	0	1	0	0	1+0	0	1	0	0
8	FW	(Venezuela)	Ronald Vargas	9	0	1	0	0	6+1	0	0	0	0	2+0	0	1	0	0	0+0	0	0	0	0
9	FW	(Republic of Ireland)	Roy O'Donovan	17	9	4	0	2	13+1	9	4	0	1	2+0	0	0	0	1	1+0	0	0	0	0
10	MF	(England)	Wayne Brown	21	0	4	0	0	11+9	0	4	0	0	0+0	0	0	0	0	1+0	0	0	0	0
11	FW	(Argentina)	Patito Rodríguez	12	1	0	0	0	6+5	1	0	0	0	0+1	0	0	0	0	0+0	0	0	0	0
12	FW	(Australia)	Mario Shabow	7	0	1	0	0	0+7	0	1	0	0	0+0	0	0	0	0	0+0	0	0	0	0
13	DF	(Croatia)	Ivan Vujica	21	0	6	0	0	19+2	0	6	0	0	0+0	0	0	0	0	0+0	0	0	0	0
16	DF	(Australia)	Nick Cowburn	11	0	0	0	0	2+8	0	0	0	0	0+1	0	0	0	0	0+0	0	0	0	0
17	DF	(North Macedonia)	Daniel Georgievski	21	1	9	0	0	18+0	1	8	0	0	2+0	0	1	0	0	1+0	0	0	0	0
18	MF	(Australia)	John Koutroumbis	13	2	2	0	0	6+5	2	2	0	0	2+0	0	0	0	0	0+0	0	0	0	0
19	FW	(Australia)	Kosta Petratos	5	0	0	0	0	0+4	0	0	0	0	0+0	0	0	0	0	0+1	0	0	0	0
20	GK	(New Zealand)	Glen Moss	11	0	0	0	0	9+0	0	0	0	0	1+1	0	0	0	0	0+0	0	0	0	0
22	DF	(Australia)	Lachlan Jackson	12	1	0	0	0	5+7	1	0	0	0	0+0	0	0	0	0	0+0	0	0	0	0
24	MF	(Australia)	Joe Champness	27	5	2	0	0	14+11	5	2	0	0	0+2	0	0	0	0	0+0	0	0	0	0
26	FW	(Australia)	Mark Moric	0	0	0	0	0	0+0	0	0	0	0	0+0	0	0	0	0	0+0	0	0	0	0
27	MF	(Australia)	Riley McGree	12	5	0	0	0	7+3	4	0	0	0	2+0	1	0	0	0	0+0	0	0	0	0
28	DF	(Australia)	Patrick Langlois	0	0	0	0	0	0+0	0	0	0	0	0+0	0	0	0	0	0+0	0	0	0	0
29	DF	(Australia)	Jake Adelson	0	0	0	0	0	0+0	0	0	0	0	0+0	0	0	0	0	0+0	0	0	0	0
30	GK	(Australia)	Ivan Necevski	0	0	0	0	0	0+0	0	0	0	0	0+0	0	0	0	0	0+0	0	0	0	0
32	MF	(Australia)	Angus Thurgate	7	0	0	0	0	0+7	0	0	0	0	0+0	0	0	0	0	0+0	0	0	0	0
44	DF	(Australia)	Nikolai Topor-Stanley	29	1	5	0	0	26+0	1	5	0	0	2+0	0	0	0	0	1+0	0	0	0	0
Players no longer at the club:
15	FW	(Australia)	Andrew Nabbout	23	10	5	0	0	22+0	10	4	0	0	0+0	0	0	0	0	1+0	0	1	0	0
21	DF	(Australia)	Daniel Alessi	0	0	0	0	0	0+0	0	0	0	0	0+0	0	0	0	0	0+0	0	0	0	0
23	MF	(Australia)	Devante Clut	5	0	0	0	0	1+4	0	0	0	0	0+0	0	0	0	0	0+0	0	0	0	0

- Last updated: 5 May 2018
- Source: au.soccerway.com
- (yellow card) = Number of bookings; (second yellow card) = Number of sending offs after a second yellow card; (red card) = Number of sending offs by a direct red card.

== Pre-season and friendlies ==
8 July 2017	Newcastle Jets (Australia)	Cancelled	(Chile) Audax Italiano	Newcastle, Australia
19:00 AEST		Cancellation		Stadium: McDonald Jones Stadium

11 July 2017	Weston Bears (Australia)	0–2	(Australia) Newcastle Jets	Weston, Australia
19:00 AEST		Report	O'Donovan 16'; D. Petratos 47'	Stadium: Rockwell Automation Park

19 July 2017	Broadmeadow Magic (Australia)	1–5	(Australia) Newcastle Jets	Newcastle, Australia
19:00 AEST	Pettit 47'	Report	O'Donovan 13'; Nabbout 36', 66', 80'; D. Petratos 85'	Stadium: Magic Park; Attendance: 1,000

26 July 2017	Central Coast Mariners (Australia)	2–0	(Australia) Newcastle Jets	Tuggerah, Australia
	Bingham; Hoole	Report		Stadium: Central Coast Mariners Centre of Excellence; Attendance: 0 (behind closed doors)

2 August 2017	Maitland FC (Australia)	0–4	(Australia) Newcastle Jets	Maitland, Australia
19:00 AEST		Report	D. Petratos 21'; K. Petratos 54' (pen.); Clut 77'; Zhengyu 81'	Stadium: Cooks Square Park; Attendance: 900

15 August 2017	Mid North Coast Select (Australia)	0–7	(Australia) Newcastle Jets	Port Macquarie, Australia
19:00 AEST		Report	Clut 1', 12'; Champness 20'; Vujica 27'; Cowburn 45+3'; Topor-Stanley 76'; O'Donovan 82'	Stadium: Port Macquarie Regional Stadium; Attendance: 4,000

17 August 2017	Northern Inland Select (Australia)	0–16	(Australia) Newcastle Jets	Tamworth, Australia
19:00 AEST		Report	O'Donovan 4', 8', 15', 49', 68', 73'; Nabbout 19', 38', 63'; Champness 21', 37'; D. Petratos 23' (pen.); K. Petratos 71', 85'; Vujica 74'; Clut 84'	Stadium: Scully Park; Attendance: 1,200

23 August 2017	Melbourne City (Australia)	1–3	(Australia) Newcastle Jets	Melbourne, Australia
	Jakobsen 56'	Report	Nabbout 22'; O'Donovan 40'; Champness 42'	Stadium: City Football Academy; Attendance: 0 (behind closed doors)

29 August 2017	Canberra Olympic (Australia)	0–5	(Australia) Newcastle Jets	Canberra, Australia
18:30 AEST		Report	Nabbout 13'; Brown 16'; O'Donovan 50'; Champness 64', 77'	Stadium: Deakin Stadium

9 September 2017	Newcastle Jets (Australia)	2–1	(Australia) Sydney FC	Newcastle, Australia
15:00 AEST	D. Petratos 12'; Shabow 71'	Report	Lokolingoy 46'	Stadium: Magic Park; Attendance: 1,327; Referee: Adrian Arntt

16 September 2017	Newcastle Jets (Australia)	2–1	(New Zealand) Wellington Phoenix	Edgeworth, Australia
15:00 AEST	O'Donovan 28'; Champness 80'	Report	Kaluđerović 66'	Stadium: Jack McLaughlan Oval; Attendance: 1,254

== Competitions ==
=== Overall ===
Competition	Started round	Final position / round	First match	Last match
A-League	—	2nd	7 October 2017	13 April 2018
A-League Finals	Semi-finals	Runners-up	27 April 2018	5 May 2018
FFA Cup	Round of 32	Round of 32	9 August 2017	9 August 2017

=== A-League ===
==== League table ====
Pos	Team	Pld	W	D	L	GF	GA	GD	Pts	Qualification
1	Sydney FC	27	20	4	3	64	22	+42	64	Qualification for 2019 AFC Champions League group stage and Finals series
2	Newcastle Jets	27	15	5	7	57	37	+20	50	Qualification for 2019 AFC Champions League second preliminary round and Finals series
3	Melbourne City	27	13	4	10	41	33	+8	43	Qualification for Finals series
4	Melbourne Victory (C)	27	12	5	10	43	37	+6	41	Qualification for 2019 AFC Champions League group stage and Finals series
5	Adelaide United	27	11	6	10	36	38	−2	39	Qualification for Finals series
6	Brisbane Roar	27	10	5	12	33	40	−7	35	Qualification for Finals series
7	Western Sydney Wanderers	27	8	9	10	38	47	−9	33	
8	Perth Glory	27	10	2	15	37	50	−13	32	
9	Wellington Phoenix (Note: Wellington Phoenix cannot qualify for the AFC Champions League as they are not recognised as an AFC club.)	27	5	6	16	31	55	−24	21	
10	Central Coast Mariners	27	4	8	15	28	49	−21	20	

Source: A-Leagues
Rules for classification: 1) points; 2) goal difference; 3) number of goals scored.
(C) Champions

==== Results summary ====
Overall								Home						Away					
Pld	W	D	L	GF	GA	GD	Pts	W	D	L	GF	GA	GD	W	D	L	GF	GA	GD
27	15	5	7	57	37	+20	50	8	2	4	26	16	+10	7	3	3	31	21	+10

Last updated: 14 April 2018.
Source: ultimatealeague.com

==== Results by round ====
Round	1	2	3	4	5	6	7	8	9	10	11	12	13	14	15	16	17	18	19	20	21	22	23	24	25	26	27
Ground	A	H	A	H	H	A	A	H	H	A	H	H	A	A	H	H	H	A	H	A	A	H	A	A	H	H	A
Result	W	D	W	D	W	W	L	W	L	W	W	W	L	D	W	W	L	D	W	D	W	W	W	L	L	L	W
Position	1	3	2	3	3	1	2	2	2	2	2	2	2	2	2	2	2	2	2	2	2	2	2	2	2	2	2

Updated to match(es) played on 14 April 2018. Source: ultimatealeague.com
A = Away; H = Home; W = Win; D = Draw; L = Loss

==== Matches ====
Win Draw Loss Cancelled

7 October 2017 1	Central Coast Mariners	1–5	Newcastle Jets	Gosford
17:35 AEDT	Asdrúbal 5'	Report	O'Donovan 9' (pen.), 28', 38'; Champness 81'; D. Petratos 90'	Stadium: Central Coast Stadium; Attendance: 12,044; Referee: Jonathan Barreiro

15 October 2017 2	Newcastle Jets	2–2	Perth Glory	Newcastle
17:00 AEDT	O'Donovan 30'; Kantarovski 60'	Report	Taggart 8', 90+2'	Stadium: McDonald Jones Stadium; Attendance: 16,663; Referee: Shaun Evans

22 October 2017 3	Brisbane Roar	1–2	Newcastle Jets	Brisbane
16:00 AEST	Boogaard 42' (o.g.)	Report	O'Donovan 12'; D. Petratos 44'	Stadium: Suncorp Stadium; Attendance: 10,104; Referee: Matthew Conger

29 October 2017 4	Newcastle Jets	1–1	Western Sydney Wanderers	Newcastle
17:00 AEDT	D. Petratos 69'	Report	Bridge 16'	Stadium: McDonald Jones Stadium; Attendance: 11,468; Referee: Chris Beath

4 November 2017 5	Newcastle Jets	3–0	Wellington Phoenix	Newcastle
19:50 AEDT	O'Donovan 37', 45+1'; Nabbout 55'	Report		Stadium: McDonald Jones Stadium; Attendance: 6,258; Referee: Kris Griffiths-Jones

11 November 2017 6	Adelaide United	1–2	Newcastle Jets	Adelaide
17:05 ACDT	Mileusnic 24'	Report	Kantarovski 45'; Nabbout 47'	Stadium: Coopers Stadium; Attendance: 8,416; Referee: Jarred Gillett

18 November 2017 7	Sydney FC	2–1	Newcastle Jets	Sydney
19:50 AEDT	Ninković 5'; Bobò 59'	Report	D. Petratos 65'	Stadium: Allianz Stadium; Attendance: 11,519; Referee: Kurt Ams

23 November 2017 8	Newcastle Jets	4–1	Melbourne Victory	Newcastle
19:50 AEDT	Georgievski 13'; Nabbout 37', 83'; Champness 75'	Report	Barbarouses 5'	Stadium: McDonald Jones Stadium; Attendance: 8,427; Referee: Stephan Lucas

2 December 2017 9	Newcastle Jets	1–2	Melbourne City	Newcastle
19:50 AEDT	Nabbout 32'	Report	McCormack 40' (pen.); Muscat 86'	Stadium: McDonald Jones Stadium; Attendance: 8,108; Referee: Shaun Evans

9 December 2017 10	Perth Glory	1–2	Newcastle Jets	Perth
19:00 AWST	Knowles 20'	Report	Koutroumbis 88'; Walker 90+2' (o.g.)	Stadium: nib Stadium; Attendance: 8,063; Referee: Adam Kersey

16 December 2017 11	Newcastle Jets	2–1	Adelaide United	Newcastle
17:35 AEDT	Nabbout 55'; D. Petratos 89' (pen.)	Report	Blackwood 67'	Stadium: McDonald Jones Stadium; Attendance: 8,146; Referee: Stephen Lucas

22 December 2017 12	Newcastle Jets	4–0	Western Sydney Wanderers	Newcastle
19:50 AEDT	Koutroumbis 11'; Hoffman 60'; Kantarovski 68'; Ugarkovic 84'	Report		Stadium: McDonald Jones Stadium; Attendance: 9,862; Referee: Kris Griffiths-Jones

29 December 2017 13	Melbourne Victory	2–1	Newcastle Jets	Melbourne
19:50 AEDT	Barbarouses 33'; Berisha 53'	Report	Hoffman 45+1'	Stadium: AAMI Park; Attendance: 15,534; Referee: Chris Beath

3 January 2018 14	Sydney FC	2–2	Newcastle Jets	Sydney
19:50 AEDT	Ninković 16'; Bobô 87'	Report	Nabbout 10'; Champness 62'	Stadium: Allianz Stadium; Attendance: 18,055; Referee: Jarred Gillett

9 January 2018 15	Newcastle Jets	2–0	Central Coast Mariners	Newcastle
19:50 AEDT	D. Petratos 82'; Rodríguez 90+2'	Report		Stadium: McDonald Jones Stadium; Attendance: 13,127; Referee: Kurt Ams

12 January 2018 16	Newcastle Jets	1–0	Brisbane Roar	Newcastle
19:50 AEDT	Hoffman 11'	Report		Stadium: McDonald Jones Stadium; Attendance: 12,137; Referee: Jonathan Borreiro

20 January 2018 17	Newcastle Jets	2–3	Wellington Phoenix	Newcastle
17:35 AEDT	Nabbout 48'; D. Petratos 86' (pen.)	Report	Ljujić 28'; Mullen 37'; Krishna 59'	Stadium: McDonald Jones Stadium; Attendance: 10,877; Referee: Jarred Gillett

25 January 2018 18	Melbourne City	2–2	Newcastle Jets	Melbourne
19:50 AEDT	Arzani 43' (pen.); Vidošić 82'	Report	Topor-Stanley 3'; Hoffman 70'	Stadium: AAMI Park; Attendance: 7,790; Referee: Kurt Ams

3 February 2018 19	Newcastle Jets	2–0	Melbourne Victory	Newcastle
17:35 AEDT	Boogaard 31'; McGree 70'	Report		Stadium: McDonald Jones Stadium; Attendance: 11,473; Referee: Shaun Evans

16 February 2018 20	Western Sydney Wanderers	2–2	Newcastle Jets	Sydney
19:50 AEDT	Riera 7' (pen.), 67' (pen.)	Report	D. Petratos 48'; Nabbout 68'	Stadium: Spotless Stadium; Attendance: 10,065; Referee: Peter Green

24 February 2018 21	Brisbane Roar	0–1	Newcastle Jets	Brisbane
16:35 AEST		Report	Champness 79'	Stadium: Suncorp Stadium; Attendance: 8,120; Referee: Stephen Lucas

3 March 2018 22	Newcastle Jets	2–1	Sydney FC	Newcastle
17:35 AEDT	D. Petratos 43' (pen.); Nabbout 56'	Report	Bobô 52'	Stadium: McDonald Jones Stadium; Attendance: 18,156; Referee: Chris Beath

17 March 2018 23	Wellington Phoenix	0–1	Newcastle Jets	Auckland
19:35 NZDT		Report	Hoffman 43'	Stadium: QBE Stadium; Attendance: 4,672; Referee: Shaun Evans

23 March 2018 24	Adelaide United	5–2	Newcastle Jets	Adelaide
19:20 ACDT	Adlung 15', 45+1'; Kitto 68'; Absalonsen 71'; Čavušević 79'	Report	Kantarovski 62', 89'	Stadium: Coopers Stadium; Attendance: 7,227; Referee: Kurt Ams

1 April 2018 25	Newcastle Jets	0–3	Melbourne City	Newcastle
17:00 AEST		Report	Fornaroli 42'; Vidošić 53', 77'	Stadium: McDonald Jones Stadium; Attendance: 11,423; Referee: Jarred Gillett

6 April 2018 26	Newcastle Jets	0–2	Perth Glory	Newcastle
19:50 AEST		Report	Castro 9' (pen.); Taggart 27'	Stadium: McDonald Jones Stadium; Attendance: 8,123; Referee: Chris Beath

14 April 2018 27	Central Coast Mariners	2–8	Newcastle Jets	Gosford
19:50 AEST	Pain 39'; Buhagiar 80'	Report	Champness 10'; O'Donovan 20', 68' (pen.); McGree 23', 53', 68'; Jackson 61'; D. Petratos 81'	Stadium: Central Coast Stadium; Attendance: 7,604; Referee: Jarred Gillett

==== Finals series ====
27 April 2018 Semi-final	Newcastle Jets	2–1	Melbourne City	Newcastle
19:50 AEST	McGree 57'; Hoffman 75'	Report	Topor-Stanley 14'	Stadium: McDonald Jones Stadium; Attendance: 19,131; Referee: Shaun Evans

5 May 2018 Grand Final	Newcastle Jets	0–1	Melbourne Victory	Newcastle
19:50 AEST		Report	Barbarouses 9'	Stadium: McDonald Jones Stadium; Attendance: 29,410; Referee: Jarred Gillett

=== FFA Cup ===
9 August 2017 Round of 32	Adelaide United (South Australia)	1–0	(New South Wales) Newcastle Jets	Adelaide
19:00 ACST	Marrone 63'	Report		Stadium: Marden Sports Complex; Attendance: 2,551; Referee: Kris Griffiths-Jones

== See also ==
- 2017–18 Newcastle Jets FC (women) season
