= 2016–17 Newcastle Jets FC season =

Newcastle Jets
2016–17 season
- Chairman: Martin Lee
- Manager: Scott Miller (to 7 September 2016); Clayton Zane (caretaker from 8 September 2016 to 23 September 2016); Mark Jones (from 23 September 2016)
- Stadium: McDonald Jones Stadium, Newcastle
- A-League: 10th
- A-League Finals Series: DNQ
- FFA Cup: Round of 32
- Top goalscorer: League: Andrew Nabbout (8 goals); All: Andrew Nabbout (8 goals)
- Highest home attendance: 11,873 vs Sydney FC (29 October 2016)
- Lowest home attendance: 5,642 vs Adelaide United (16 December 2016)
- Average home league attendance: 8,645
Home colours	Away colours	Third colours

The 2016–17 Newcastle Jets FC season was the club's 16th season since its establishment in 2000. The club participated in the A-League for the 12th time and the FFA Cup for the third time.

== Players ==
=== Squad information ===
Note: Flags indicate national team as defined under FIFA eligibility rules; some limited exceptions apply. Players may hold more than one non-FIFA nationality.

No.	Pos.	Nation	Player
1	GK	AUS	Ben Kennedy
2	DF	AUS	Daniel Mullen
3	DF	AUS	Jason Hoffman
4	DF	AUS	Nigel Boogaard (Captain)
5	MF	AUS	Ben Kantarovski
6	MF	AUS	Steven Ugarković
7	MF	AUS	Andrew Hoole
8	MF	CRO	Mateo Poljak (vice-captain)
9	FW	FIN	Aleksandr Kokko
10	MF	ENG	Wayne Brown
11	FW	AUS	Labinot Haliti
13	DF	CRO	Ivan Vujica

No.	Pos.	Nation	Player
15	FW	AUS	Andrew Nabbout
16	DF	AUS	Nick Cowburn
18	MF	CHN	Ma Leilei
19	FW	DEN	Morten Nordstrand
20	GK	AUS	Jack Duncan
21	DF	AUS	Daniel Alessi
22	DF	AUS	Lachlan Jackson
23	MF	AUS	Devante Clut
24	FW	AUS	Kristian Brymora
28	MF	AUS	Johnny Koutroumbis
29	DF	AUS	Joel Allwright
50	GK	AUS	Tomislav Arčaba (Injury replacement)

=== From youth squad ===
N	Pos.	Nat.	Name	Age	Notes
24	FW	(Australia)	Kristian Brymora	17	1 year senior contract

=== Transfers in ===
No.	Position	Player	Transferred from	Type/fee	Contract length	Date	Ref
23	MF	Devante Clut	Brisbane Roar	Free transfer	2 years	28 April 2016	
10	MF	(England) Wayne Brown	Unattached	Undisclosed Fee	2 years	16 May 2016	
21	DF	Daniel Alessi	Western Sydney Wanderers	Free transfer	2 years	1 June 2016	
7	MF	Andrew Hoole	Sydney FC	Free transfer	1 year	21 June 2016	
20	GK	Jack Duncan	Unattached	Free transfer	2 years	24 June 2016	
13	DF	(Croatia) Ivan Vujica	(Croatia) Dinamo Zagreb	Undisclosed Fee	2 years	4 July 2016	
15	FW	Andrew Nabbout	Unattached	Undisclosed Fee	2 years	19 July 2016	
9	FW	(Finland) Aleksandr Kokko	(Finland) RoPS	Undisclosed Fee	2 years	6 August 2016	
28	MF	John Koutroumbis	Adelaide United	Free transfer	1 year	22 October 2016	
18	MF	(China) Ma Leilei	Unattached	Undisclosed Fee	1 year	26 October 2016	
40	GK	Jim Fogarty	(Australia) Edgeworth Eagles	Injury replacement loan	2 weeks	5 November 2016	
26	DF	Iain Fyfe	(Australia) Campbelltown City	Free transfer	1 month	18 November 2016	
50	GK	Tomislav Arčaba	Unattached	Free transfer	1 year	14 January 2017	
29	DF	Joel Allwright	Unattached	Free transfer	1 year	20 January 2017	

=== Transfers out ===
No.	Pos.	Nat.	Name	Age	Moving to	Type	Transfer window	Transfer fee	Source
6	MF	(Australia)	Cameron Watson	28		End of contract	Pre-season		
7	MF	(Serbia)	Enver Alivodić	31		End of contract	Pre-season		
10	FW	(Brazil)	Leonardo	33		End of contract	Pre-season		
18	MF	(Australia)	Josh Barresi	21		End of contract	Pre-season		
25	FW	(Australia)	Brandon Lundy	19		End of contract	Pre-season		
28	FW	(Australia)	Ryan Kitto	21		End of contract	Pre-season		
1	GK	(Australia)	Mark Birighitti	25		End of contract	Pre-season		
40	GK	(Australia)	Jim Fogarty	24		End of contract	Mid-season		
26	DF	(Australia)	Iain Fyfe	34		End of contract	Mid-season		
17	FW	(Australia)	Radovan Pavicevic	21		Released	Mid-season		
14	MF	(Australia)	Mitch Cooper	22		Released	Mid-season		
12	FW	(Australia)	Andy Brennan	23		Released	Mid-season		

=== Contract extensions ===
Name	Position	Duration	Contract Expiry	Notes
(Denmark) Morten Nordstrand	Striker	1 year	2017	
(Australia) Jason Hoffman	Right-back	2 years	2018	
(Australia) Ben Kantarovski	Central midfielder	1 year	2017	
(England) Wayne Brown	Midfielder	1 year	2019	
(Australia) Steven Ugarkovic	Defensive midfielder	2 years	2019	
(Australia) Johnny Koutroumbis	Central defender	2 years	2019	

== Technical staff ==
Position	Name
Head coach	(Australia) Mark Jones
Assistant coach	(Australia) Clayton Zane
Youth coach	(Australia) Clayton Zane
Goalkeeping coach	(Australia) Jess Vanstrattan
Physiotherapist	(Australia) Justin Dougherty

== Statistics ==
=== Squad statistics ===
N	Pos.	Nat.	Name	Total					A-League					FFA Cup
N	Pos.	Nat.	Name	Apps	Goals	Yellow card	Second yellow card	Red card	Apps	Goals	Yellow card	Second yellow card	Red card	Apps	Goals	Yellow card	Second yellow card	Red card
1	GK	(Australia)	Ben Kennedy	1	0	0	0	0	0	0	0	0	0	1	0	0	0	0
2	DF	(Australia)	Daniel Mullen	18	0	2	0	0	15+2	0	2	0	0	1	0	0	0	0
3	DF	(Australia)	Jason Hoffman	26	1	3	1	0	24+1	1	2	1	0	1	0	1	0	0
4	DF	(Australia)	Nigel Boogaard	20	2	7	0	0	19+1	2	7	0	0	0	0	0	0	0
5	MF	(Australia)	Ben Kantarovski	13	0	1	0	0	8+4	0	1	0	0	1	0	0	0	0
6	MF	(Australia)	Steven Ugarković	26	1	7	0	0	24+1	1	6	0	0	1	0	1	0	0
7	MF	(Australia)	Andrew Hoole	27	5	8	0	0	25+1	5	8	0	0	1	0	0	0	0
8	MF	(Croatia)	Mateo Poljak	25	1	1	0	0	18+6	1	1	0	0	1	0	0	0	0
9	FW	(Finland)	Aleksandr Kokko	13	1	2	0	0	7+6	1	2	0	0	0	0	0	0	0
10	MF	(England)	Wayne Brown	23	2	6	0	0	19+3	1	5	0	0	1	1	1	0	0
11	FW	(Australia)	Labinot Haliti	6	0	0	0	0	1+5	0	0	0	0	0	0	0	0	0
12	FW	(Australia)	Harry Sawyer	5	0	1	0	0	1+4	0	1	0	0	0	0	0	0	0
13	DF	(Croatia)	Ivan Vujica	11	0	1	0	0	10+1	0	1	0	0	0	0	0	0	0
15	FW	(Australia)	Andrew Nabbout	25	8	3	0	0	23+1	8	3	0	0	1	0	0	0	0
16	DF	(Australia)	Nick Cowburn	16	0	0	0	0	12+3	0	0	0	0	1	0	0	0	0
18	MF	(China)	Ma Leilei	15	1	5	0	0	7+8	1	5	0	0	0	0	0	0	0
19	FW	(Denmark)	Morten Nordstrand	23	3	2	0	0	18+5	3	2	0	0	0	0	0	0	0
20	GK	(Australia)	Jack Duncan	25	0	0	0	0	25	0	0	0	0	0	0	0	0	0
21	DF	(Australia)	Daniel Alessi	0	0	0	0	0	0	0	0	0	0	0	0	0	0	0
22	DF	(Australia)	Lachlan Jackson	17	0	3	0	0	16+1	0	3	0	0	0	0	0	0	0
23	MF	(Australia)	Devante Clut	19	1	0	0	0	7+11	1	0	0	0	1	0	0	0	0
24	FW	(Australia)	Kristian Brymora	2	0	1	0	0	0+1	0	0	0	0	0+1	0	1	0	0
27	DF	(Australia)	Caio de Godoy	0	0	0	0	0	0	0	0	0	0	0	0	0	0	0
28	MF	(Australia)	Johnny Koutroumbis	22	0	4	0	0	12+10	0	4	0	0	0	0	0	0	0
29	DF	(Australia)	Joel Allwright	2	0	0	0	0	0+2	0	0	0	0	0	0	0	0	0
30	GK	(Australia)	Pierce Clark	0	0	0	0	0	0	0	0	0	0	0	0	0	0	0
50	GK	(Australia)	Tomislav Arčaba	2	0	0	0	0	2	0	0	0	0	0	0	0	0	0
Players no longer at the club:
12	FW	(Australia)	Andy Brennan	2	0	0	0	0	1+1	0	0	0	0	0	0	0	0	0
14	MF	(Australia)	Mitch Cooper	0	0	0	0	0	0	0	0	0	0	0	0	0	0	0
17	FW	(Australia)	Radovan Pavicevic	0	0	0	0	0	0	0	0	0	0	0	0	0	0	0
26	DF	(Australia)	Iain Fyfe	3	0	1	0	0	3	0	1	0	0	0	0	0	0	0
40	GK	(Australia)	Jim Fogarty	0	0	0	0	0	0	0	0	0	0	0	0	0	0	0

- Last updated: 15 April 2017
- Source: au.soccerway.com
- (yellow card) = Number of bookings; (second yellow card) = Number of sending offs after a second yellow card; (red card) = Number of sending offs by a direct red card.

== Pre-season and friendlies ==
TBD	Newcastle Jets (Australia)	Postponed	(Australia) NPL NNSW Select	Newcastle, Australia
		Source		Stadium: Magic Park

27 July 2016	Central Coast Mariners (Australia)	1–1	(Australia) Newcastle Jets	Tuggerah, Australia
	O'Donovan	Report	W. Brown	Stadium: Central Coast Mariners Centre of Excellence

13 August 2016	Newcastle Jets (Australia)	1–2	(Australia) Central Coast Mariners	Tamworth, Australia
16:00 AEST	Clut 36'	Report	Powell 39'; Pain 50'	Stadium: Scully Park Regional Sporting Precinct; Attendance: 2,154

27 August 2016 China tour	Liaoning Whowin (China)	2–3	(Australia) Newcastle Jets	Huludao, China
19:30 CST	L. Wang 55'; Lei 77'	Report	Clut 47'; Hoole 66' (pen.), 88'	Stadium: Huludao City Stadium; Attendance: 19,019; Referee: Ma Ning (China)

31 August 2016 China tour	Eastern (Hong Kong)	1–2	(Australia) Newcastle Jets	Shenzhen, China
16:30 CST	Šarić 48'	Report	Brymora 40'; Nabbout 86' (pen.)	Stadium: Bao'an Stadium; Referee: Liang Cai Wei (China)

2 September 2016 China tour	Kitchee (Hong Kong)	3–4	(Australia) Newcastle Jets	Shenzhen, China
16:30 CST	Li 6'; Lum 21'; Stamp 77'	Report	Hoole 14'; Nordstrand 52'; Nabbout 56'; Hoffman 90+1'	Stadium: Bao'an Stadium; Referee: Yamamoto Yudai (China)

11 September 2016	Edgeworth (Australia)	0–4	(Australia) Newcastle Jets	Newcastle, Australia
15:00 AEST		Report	Hoole 29' (pen.), 71'; Clut 42'; Nordstrand 58'	Stadium: Jack McLaughlan Oval

18 September 2016	Melbourne City (Australia)	0–4	(Australia) Newcastle Jets	Ballarat, Australia
15:00 AEST		Report	Nabbout 16'; Nordstrand 44', 71'; Brymora 79'	Stadium: Morshead Park; Referee: Jonathan Barreiro

24 September 2016	Newcastle Jets (Australia)	2–0	(Australia) Western Sydney Wanderers	Cessnock, Australia
15:00 AEST		Report	Hoole 22'; Nabbout 41'	Stadium: Cessnock Sportsground; Attendance: 2,132; Referee: Katie Patterson

== Competitions ==
=== Overview ===
Competition	First match	Last match	Starting round	Final position	Record							
Competition	First match	Last match	Starting round	Final position	Pld	W	D	L	GF	GA	GD	Win %
A-League	9 October 2016	15 April 2017	Matchday 1	10th	27	5	7	15	28	53	−25	18.52
FFA Cup	3 August 2016		Round of 32	Round of 32	1	0	0	1	1	3	−2	0.00
Total					28	5	7	16	29	56	−27	17.86

Source: Competitions

=== A-League ===
==== League table ====
Pos	Team	Pld	W	D	L	GF	GA	GD	Pts	Qualification
1	Sydney FC (C)	27	20	6	1	55	12	+43	66	Qualification for 2018 AFC Champions League group stage and Finals series
2	Melbourne Victory	27	15	4	8	49	31	+18	49	Qualification for 2018 AFC Champions League group stage and Finals series
3	Brisbane Roar	27	11	9	7	43	37	+6	42	Qualification for 2018 AFC Champions League second preliminary round and Finals series
4	Melbourne City	27	11	6	10	49	44	+5	39	Qualification for Finals series
5	Perth Glory	27	10	9	8	53	53	0	39	Qualification for Finals series
6	Western Sydney Wanderers	27	8	12	7	35	35	0	36	Qualification for Finals series
7	Wellington Phoenix (Note: Wellington Phoenix cannot qualify for the AFC Champions League as they are not recognised as an AFC club.)	27	8	6	13	41	46	−5	30	
8	Central Coast Mariners	27	6	5	16	31	52	−21	23	
9	Adelaide United	27	5	8	14	25	46	−21	23	
10	Newcastle Jets	27	5	7	15	28	53	−25	22	

Source: A-Leagues
Rules for classification: 1) points; 2) goal difference; 3) number of goals scored.
(C) Champions

==== Results summary ====
Overall								Home						Away					
Pld	W	D	L	GF	GA	GD	Pts	W	D	L	GF	GA	GD	W	D	L	GF	GA	GD
27	5	7	15	28	53	−25	22	3	6	4	16	19	−3	2	1	11	12	34	−22

Last updated: 15 April 2017.
Source: ultimatealeague.com

==== Results by round ====
Round	1	2	3	4	5	6	7	8	9	10	11	12	13	14	15	16	17	18	19	20	21	22	23	24	25	26	27
Ground	H	H	A	H	A	A	H	A	H	A	H	H	A	A	H	A	H	A	H	A	H	H	A	A	H	A	A
Result	D	W	D	L	L	L	D	L	L	W	W	D	L	W	D	L	W	L	D	L	D	L	L	L	L	L	L
Position	5	3	4	6	7	8	7	8	9	7	5	5	7	6	6	8	6	7	6	7	7	8	8	8	9	10	10

Updated to match(es) played on 15 April 2017. Source: ultimatealeague.com
A = Away; H = Home; W = Win; D = Draw; L = Loss

==== Matches ====
9 October 2016 1	Newcastle Jets	1–1	Adelaide United	Newcastle
17:00 AEDT	W. Brown 17'	Report	Makarounas 29'	Stadium: McDonald Jones Stadium; Attendance: 9,145; Referee: Alan Milliner

16 October 2016 2	Newcastle Jets	4–0	Brisbane Roar	Newcastle
17:00 AEDT	Hingert 8' (o.g.); Boogaard 62'; Ugarković 71'; Clut 86'	Report		Stadium: McDonald Jones Stadium; Attendance: 8,335; Referee: Peter Green

23 October 2016 3	Western Sydney Wanderers	2–2	Newcastle Jets	Sydney
19:00 AEDT	Borda 24'; Dimas 45+2' (pen.)	Report	Boogaard 82'; Hoole 88'	Stadium: Spotless Stadium; Attendance: 13,247; Referee: Chris Beath

29 October 2016 4	Newcastle Jets	0–2	Sydney FC	Newcastle
17:35 AEDT		Report	Brosque 8'; Ninković 49'	Stadium: McDonald Jones Stadium; Attendance: 11,873; Referee: Daniel Elder

5 November 2016 5	Wellington Phoenix	2–0	Newcastle Jets	Wellington
19:35 NZDT	Krishna 21', 41'	Report		Stadium: Westpac Stadium; Attendance: 5,832; Referee: Shaun Evans

10 November 2016 6	Melbourne City	2–1	Newcastle Jets	Melbourne
19:50 AEDT	Fornaroli 14', 27'	Report	Nabbout 36'	Stadium: AAMI Park; Attendance: 7,745; Referee: Adam Fielding

20 November 2016 7	Newcastle Jets	1–1	Central Coast Mariners	Newcastle
17:00 AEDT	Nordstrand 64'	Report	McGing 42'	Stadium: McDonald Jones Stadium; Attendance: 11,238; Referee: Jonathan Barreiro

26 November 2016 8	Melbourne Victory	2–0	Newcastle Jets	Melbourne
17:35 AEDT	Fyfe 52' (o.g.); Rojas 54'	Report		Stadium: AAMI Park; Attendance: 18,267; Referee: Alan Milliner

4 December 2016 9	Newcastle Jets	0–2	Sydney FC	Newcastle
17:00 AEDT		Report	Ninković 63'; Ibini 79'	Stadium: McDonald Jones Stadium; Attendance: 8,473; Referee: Adam Fielding

10 December 2016 10	Perth Glory	1–2	Newcastle Jets	Perth
19:00 AWST	Marinković 7'	Report	Hoole 21'; Smiljanić 45+1'	Stadium: nib Stadium; Attendance: 9,202; Referee: Daniel Elder

16 December 2016 11	Newcastle Jets	2–1	Adelaide United	Newcastle
19:50 AEDT	Nabbout 29'; Nordstrand 90+3'	Report	Isaías 68'	Stadium: McDonald Jones Stadium; Attendance: 5,642; Referee: Shaun Evans

26 December 2016 12	Newcastle Jets	2–2	Wellington Phoenix	Newcastle
17:35 AEDT	Hoole 48'; Nabbout 62'	Report	Barbarouses 35'; Finkler 50'	Stadium: McDonald Jones Stadium; Attendance: 8,451; Referee: Jarred Gillett

2 January 2017 13	Melbourne Victory	4–2	Newcastle Jets	Geelong
19:50 AEDT	Berisha 30' (pen.); Rojas 35'; Ben Khalfallah 60'; Troisi 69'	Report	Ma 61'; Valeri 76' (o.g.)	Stadium: Simonds Stadium; Attendance: 14,081; Referee: Chris Beath

7 January 2017 14	Brisbane Roar	2–3	Newcastle Jets	Brisbane
16:35 AEST	Oar 15'; Maclaren 82' (pen.)	Report	Hoole 45+1'; Nabbout 72'; Nordstrand 84'	Stadium: Suncorp Stadium; Attendance: 14,470; Referee: Kurt Ams

15 January 2017 15	Newcastle Jets	2–2	Perth Glory	Newcastle
17:00 AEDT	Poljak 38' (pen.); Nabbout 45+2'	Report	Taggart 7'; Keogh 56'	Stadium: McDonald Jones Stadium; Attendance: 9,174; Referee: Stephen Lucas

22 January 2017 16	Western Sydney Wanderers	2–0	Newcastle Jets	Sydney
17:00 AEST	Scott 44'; Sotirio 68'	Report		Stadium: Campbelltown Stadium; Attendance: 9,477; Referee: Matthew Conger

27 January 2017 17	Newcastle Jets	2–1	Melbourne City	Coffs Harbour
17:00 AEDT	Nabbout 14', 52'	Report	Fornaroli 69' (pen.)	Stadium: C.ex Coffs International Stadium; Attendance: 7,891; Referee: Kurt Ams

4 February 2017 18	Perth Glory	3–2	Newcastle Jets	Perth
19:00 AWST	Castro 13' (pen.), 42'; Taggart 59'	Report	Hoole 37'; Hoffman 71'	Stadium: nib Stadium; Attendance: 12,903; Referee: Jonathan Barreiro

13 February 2017 19	Newcastle Jets	0–0	Melbourne Victory	Newcastle
19:50 AEDT		Report		Stadium: McDonald Jones Stadium; Attendance: 6,233; Referee: Stephen Lucas

17 February 2017 20	Adelaide United	1–0	Newcastle Jets	Adelaide
19:20 ACDT	Carrusca 61' (pen.)	Report		Stadium: Coopers Stadium; Attendance: 6,642; Referee: Kurt Ams

26 February 2017 21	Newcastle Jets	1–1	Central Coast Mariners	Newcastle
17:00 AEDT	Kokko 20'	Report	Galloway 50'	Stadium: McDonald Jones Stadium; Attendance: 9,423; Referee: Shaun Evans

5 March 2017 22	Newcastle Jets	1–3	Brisbane Roar	Newcastle
19:00 AEDT	Nabbout 10' (pen.)	Report	Maclaren 62' (pen.), 74'; D'Agostino 90'	Stadium: McDonald Jones Stadium; Attendance: 7,122; Referee: Jarred Gillett

18 March 2017 23	Melbourne City	4–0	Newcastle Jets	Melbourne
19:50 AEDT	Cahill 12'; Fitzgerald 65'; Fornaroli 75' (pen.), 81'	Report		Stadium: AAMI Park; Attendance: 8,949; Referee: Chris Beath

26 March 2017 24	Wellington Phoenix	5–0	Newcastle Jets	Wellington
19:00 NZDT	Barbarouses 24'; Finkler 37'; Ridenton 49'; Hoffman 66' (o.g.); Bonevacia 86'	Report		Stadium: Westpac Stadium; Attendance: 4,828; Referee: Jonathan Barreiro

1 April 2017 25	Newcastle Jets	0–3	Western Sydney Wanderers	Newcastle
17:35 AEDT		Report	Cornthwaite 40', 50'; Sotirio 42'	Stadium: McDonald Jones Stadium; Attendance: 9,380; Referee: Shaun Evans

9 April 2017 26	Central Coast Mariners	2–0	Newcastle Jets	Gosford
17:00 AEST	Montgomery 32'; Ferreira 51'	Report		Stadium: Central Coast Stadium; Attendance: 8,073; Referee: Stephen Lucas

15 April 2017 27	Sydney FC	2–0	Newcastle Jets	Sydney
17:35 AEST	Ninković 56'; Brosque 87'	Report		Stadium: Allianz Stadium; Attendance: 15,787; Referee: Shaun Evans

=== FFA Cup ===
3 August 2016 Round of 32	Newcastle Jets (New South Wales)	1–3	(Victoria (state)) Melbourne Victory	Newcastle
19:30 AEST	W. Brown 50'	Report	Berisha 5'; Bozanic 54' (pen.); Howard 87'	Stadium: Magic Park; Attendance: 1,956; Referee: Alan Milliner
