= Joe Champness =

New Zealand association football player

Personal information
- Full name: Joseph William Champness
- Date of birth: 27 April 1997 (age 29)
- Place of birth: Auckland, New Zealand
- Height: 1.89 m (6 ft 2 in)
- Position: Winger

Team information
- Current team: Havadar

Youth career
- 2013–2015: Moreton Bay United

Senior career*
Years	Team	Apps	(Gls)
2015	Moreton Bay United	17	(3)
2016	Brisbane Roar	0	(0)
2017–2021	Newcastle Jets	36	(8)
2017	→ Académica de Coimbra (loan)	9	(0)
2020–2021	→ Brisbane Roar (loan)	24	(2)
2021–2022	Giresunspor	11	(2)
2023–2024	Adanaspor	10	(1)
2024	Auckland FC	0	(0)
2025–	Havadar Tehran	10	(0)

International career^{‡}
2016–2017	Australia U20	7	(2)
2018–2019	Australia U23	3	(2)
2021	New Zealand U23	5	(0)
2021–	New Zealand	6	(0)
Medal record
Men's football
Representing Australia
AFF U19 Youth Championship
First place	2016 Vietnam	U20 Team
- * Club domestic league appearances and goals as of 14 May 2025 ‡ National team caps and goals as of 25 March 2022

Joseph William Champness (born 27 April 1997) is a New Zealand professional footballer and rapper who plays as a winger for Persian Gulf Pro League club Havadar Tehran and the New Zealand national team. Born in New Zealand but raised in Australia, Champness represents New Zealand in international competition after switching from Australia in 2021.

== Early life ==
Champness attended St Patrick's College where he was college captain in 2014. His younger brother Daniel Francis Champness, who was also college captain, plays as a midfielder for Moreton Bay United.

== Club career ==
=== Newcastle Jets ===
Champness signed a scholarship contract with the Newcastle Jets along with three other emerging youngsters in January 2017 until the end of the 2017–18 season, but almost immediately after the deals were announced Champness and former emerging Jet Antonee Burke-Gilroy signed a loan deal with Portuguese second division club Académica de Coimbra through to mid-2017. Champness spent his time at Academica playing football for the reserve team and occasionally training with the first team.

Champness had a successful pre-season in 2017 appearing regularly for the first team, scoring four goals and impressing new coach Ernie Merrick enough to reward him with a three-year deal until 2019/20 although he will still be playing under the scholarship contract for the 2017–18 season. Champness made his professional debut on 7 October 2017 away to the Central Coast Mariners coming on late and scoring a goal in the 81st minute. Champness then started his first professional game in Round 5 at home against the Wellington Phoenix. Champness scored his second goal for Newcastle in round 8 starting the game and scoring in the 75th minute in the Jets 4–1 win over the Melbourne Victory.

On 14 August 2019, prior to the season after spending most of the pre-season in the United States, Champness decided to quit playing soccer, so that he can follow his music career. He made statements to the effect that if he decided to return to playing in the next three years, he would come back to Newcastle Jets.

=== Brisbane Roar ===
Following his musical career break from football Champness joined Brisbane Roar on loan ahead of the 2020–21 A-League season, angering many in the Newcastle camp over his backing out of the alleged "deal" to return to the Jets.

=== Giresunspor ===
Champness joined Turkish club Giresunspor of the Süper Lig on a three-year contract with a possible one-year extension into the 2024–25 season. Due to unpaid wages he left the club in March 2022 after 13 games, having scored 4 goals while coming on as a substitute in almost all of his matches. Champness terminated the contract and proceeded with a FIFA Dispute Resolution claim. FIFA found in favour of Champness and awarded him €790,000 (1.33 million New Zealand Dollars) plus interest.

=== Havadar ===
Champness joined Persian Gulf Pro League club Havadar in January 2025.

== International career ==
Champness was born in New Zealand to a Filipino mother, making him eligible to represent New Zealand, Australia and Philippines at international level.

He has represented Australia at youth level, and was a member of the Young Socceroos team in the 2016 AFC U-19 Championship in Bahrain.

It was reported on 14 June 2021 that Champness changed his international allegiance to New Zealand.

On 25 June 2021, Champness was called up to the New Zealand squad for the delayed 2020 Summer Olympics.

He made his debut for the New Zealand national team on 12 October 2021 in a friendly against Bahrain.

== Music career ==
Outside from his football career, Champness releases music under the name JOWIC. He has released 5 singles as of May 2021. His biggest single, "My Plan" was released in February 2020, amassing over 3.5 million combined views over multiple platforms, and placements on the music TV stations BET Jams and VH1 Soul.

Critical response

“My Plan” received a 3.5/5 rating from Triple J critic Dave Ruby Howe, who compared the style of the song to PartyNextDoor and Bryson Tiller.

In 2019, Champness left the Newcastle Jets to pursue a music career in Los Angeles. Champness came back to Australia in the wake of the COVID-19 pandemic, and signed on loan with the Brisbane Roar. This caused a backlash from the Jets, who claimed that Champness had signed a contract that said if he came back from Los Angeles within three years, he would only be able to play for them.

== Career statistics ==
As of 21 June 2021

Appearances and goals by club, season and competition
Club	Season	League			Cup		Other		Total	
Club	Season	Division	Apps	Goals	Apps	Goals	Apps	Goals	Apps	Goals
AAC Secção de Futebol	2016–17	Campeonato de Portugal	9	0	0	0	0	0	9	0
Newcastle Jets	2017–18	A-League	27	5	0	0	0	0	27	5
Newcastle Jets	2018–19	A-League	9	3	0	0	0	0	9	3
Brisbane Roar (loan)	2020–21	A-League	24	2	0	0	0	0	24	2
Career total			69	10	0	0	0	0	69	10

== Honours ==
Auckland FC

- A-League Premiership: 2024-25

Australia U19

- AFF U-19 Youth Championship: 2016
