= Robert Stamp =

English footballer

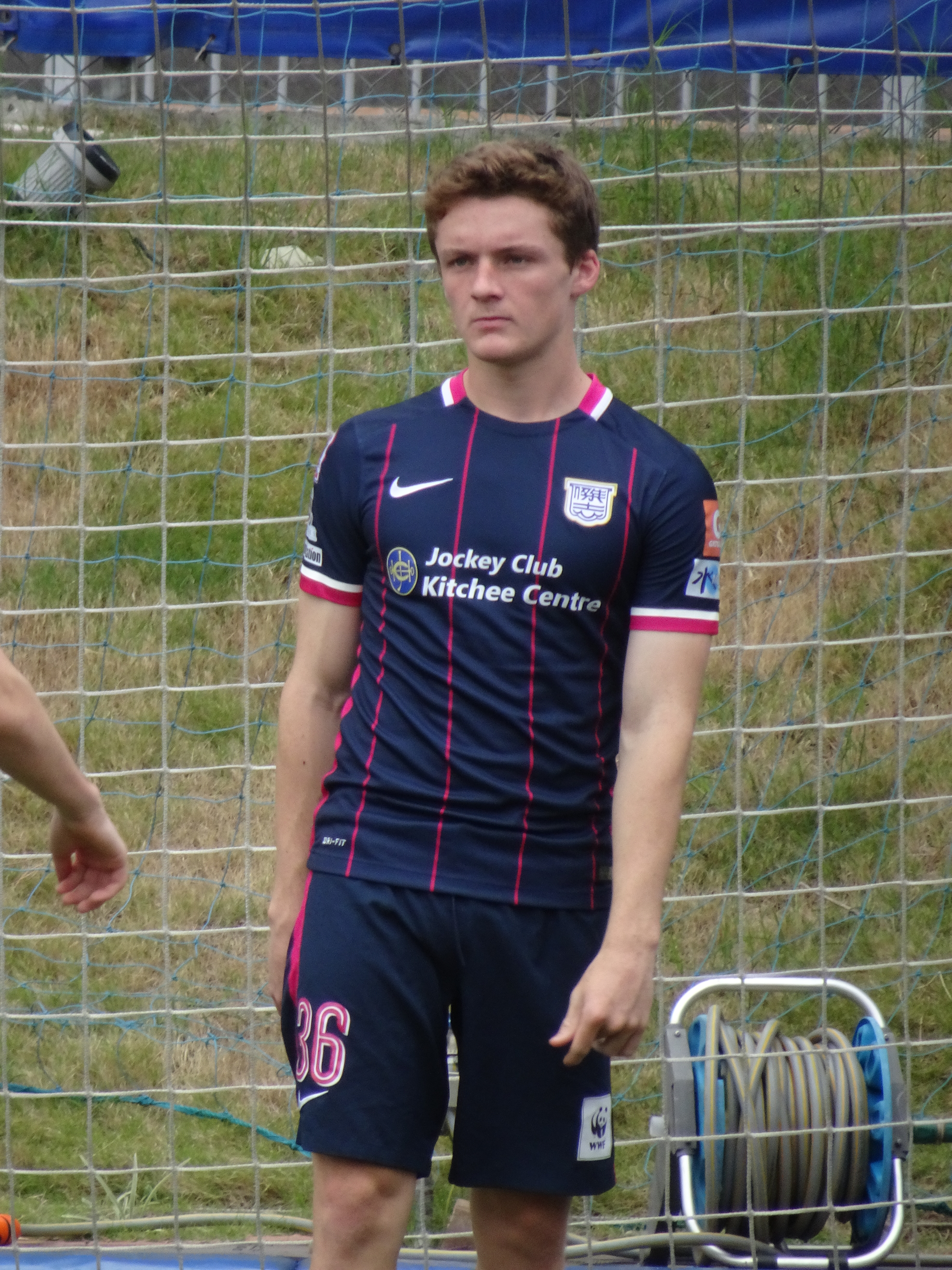

Personal information
- Full name: Robert Victor Alexander Stamp
- Date of birth: 1 August 1999 (age 27)
- Place of birth: England
- Position: Forward

Youth career
- 2010–2014: Kowloon Cricket Club
- 2014–2016: Kitchee

Senior career*
Years	Team	Apps	(Gls)
2016–2018	Kitchee	0	(0)
- * Club domestic league appearances and goals as of 28 August 2019

Robert Victor Alexander Stamp (born 1 August 1999) is an English former professional footballer, who played as a forward.

== Club career ==
Stamp made his senior debut for Kitchee on 20 December 2016, coming on as a substitute at the 54th minute in a 4–1 win over HKFC in the Hong Kong FA Cup.

After suffering from a serious injury, Stamp quit professional football in 2018.

== Personal life ==
Born in England, Stamp moved to Hong Kong before his first birthday. He was raised in Hong Kong and was educated at Island School.
