= Andrew Nabbout =

Australian soccer player (born 1992)

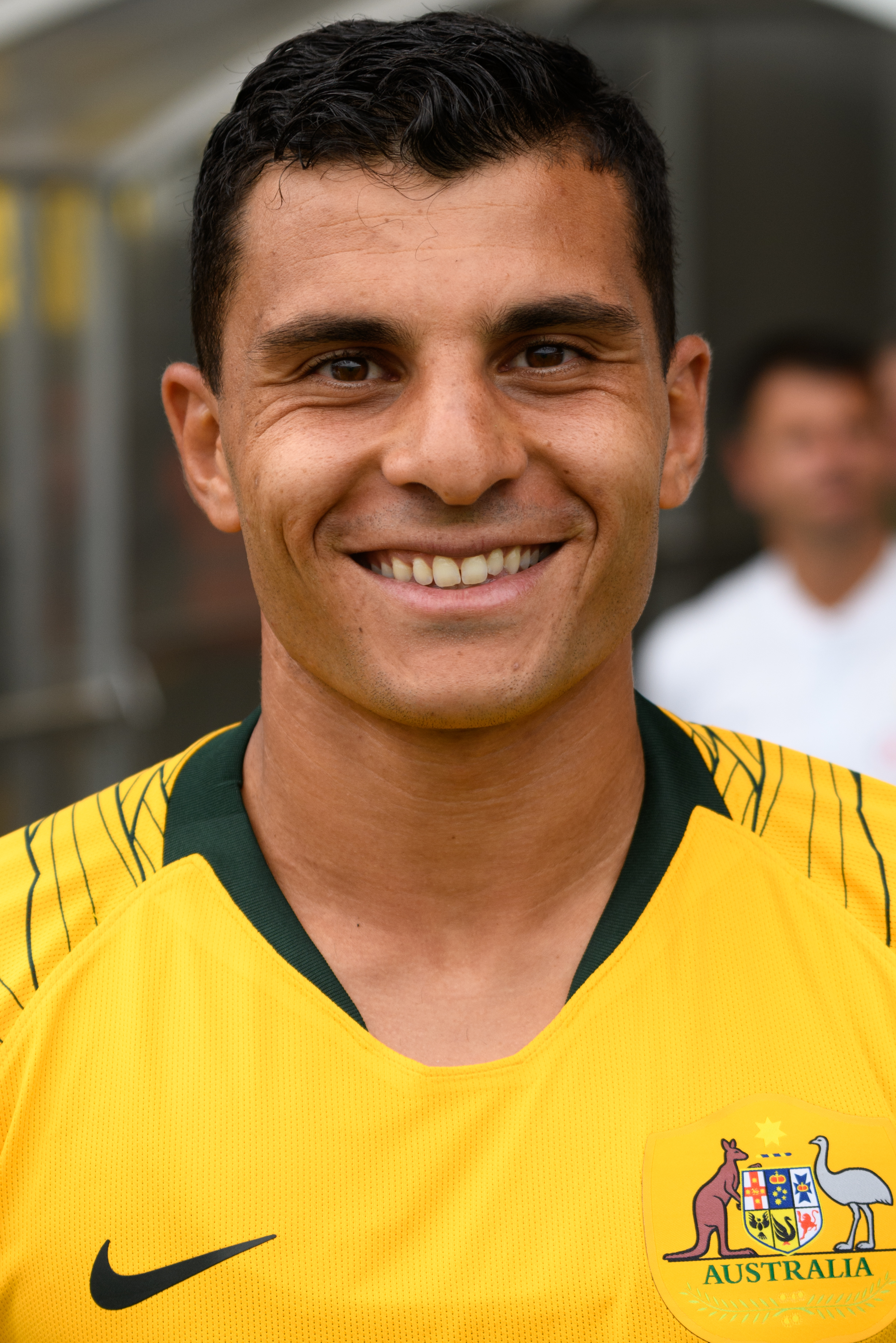
- Nabbout with Australia in 2018

Personal information
- Full name: Andrew Nabbout
- Date of birth: 17 December 1992 (age 33)
- Place of birth: Carlton, Victoria, Australia
- Height: 1.78 m (5 ft 10 in)
- Positions: Forward; winger

Team information
- Current team: Melbourne City
- Number: 15

Youth career
- 2004–2007: Brunswick City
- 2007–2009: Green Gully
- 2009–2010: Sunshine George Cross
- 2012–2013: Melbourne Victory

Senior career*
Years	Team	Apps	(Gls)
2010	Sunshine George Cross	14	(0)
2011–2012	Heidelberg United	32	(3)
2012	Moreland Zebras	10	(0)
2013–2015	Melbourne Victory	40	(5)
2016	Negeri Sembilan	12	(8)
2016–2018	Newcastle Jets	46	(18)
2018–2019	Urawa Red Diamonds	16	(1)
2019–2020	Melbourne Victory	22	(8)
2020–	Melbourne City	102	(15)

International career^{‡}
2018–2021	Australia	10	(2)
- * Club domestic league appearances and goals as of 5 November 2024 ‡ National team caps and goals as of 12 November 2021

Andrew Nabbout (/ˈnɑ.buːt/, nah-BOOT; born 17 December 1992) is an Australian professional soccer player who plays as a winger for A-League club Melbourne City.

== Early life ==
Nabbout was born in Melbourne to a family of Lebanese descent. He played youth football for Brunswick City, Green Gully and Sunshine George Cross. Nabbout also attended St Joseph's College in Melbourne. He is fluent in both English and Lebanese Arabic.

== Club career ==
=== Melbourne Victory ===
==== 2012–13 season ====
Nabbout signed for Melbourne Victory's Youth Team for the 2012–13 season on 1 October 2012. Having played in one NYL friendly; a 2-goal man of match performance against Altona Magic, Nabbout went on to make his senior debut for Melbourne Victory in an A-League match against Brisbane Roar on 13 October 2012 in a 5–0 defeat.

On 10 November 2012, Nabbout came off the bench in the 66th minute away against bitter rivals Sydney FC, at the time being 2–0 down, and wrote his name into Victory folklore by scoring a superb 78th-minute goal and then scoring the winning goal in the 91st minute of the game to help Melbourne win the game 3–2. On 17 November 2012, Nabbout earned his first ever start in a home game and scored his first goal in a home game against Central Coast Mariners, a game which ended 2–2. He then signed a three-year senior contract with the Victory.

On 7 December 2012, Nabbout made his first full 90 minute appearance for Melbourne against Adelaide. For him it was a night to remember, scoring his fourth ever goal with the assistance of Marco Rojas. The match turned out to be one to forget for Melbourne, losing 2–4.

Nabbout made a total of 21 appearances for Melbourne, 2 of them in the final series, logging up a total time of 786 minutes.

==== 2013–14 season ====
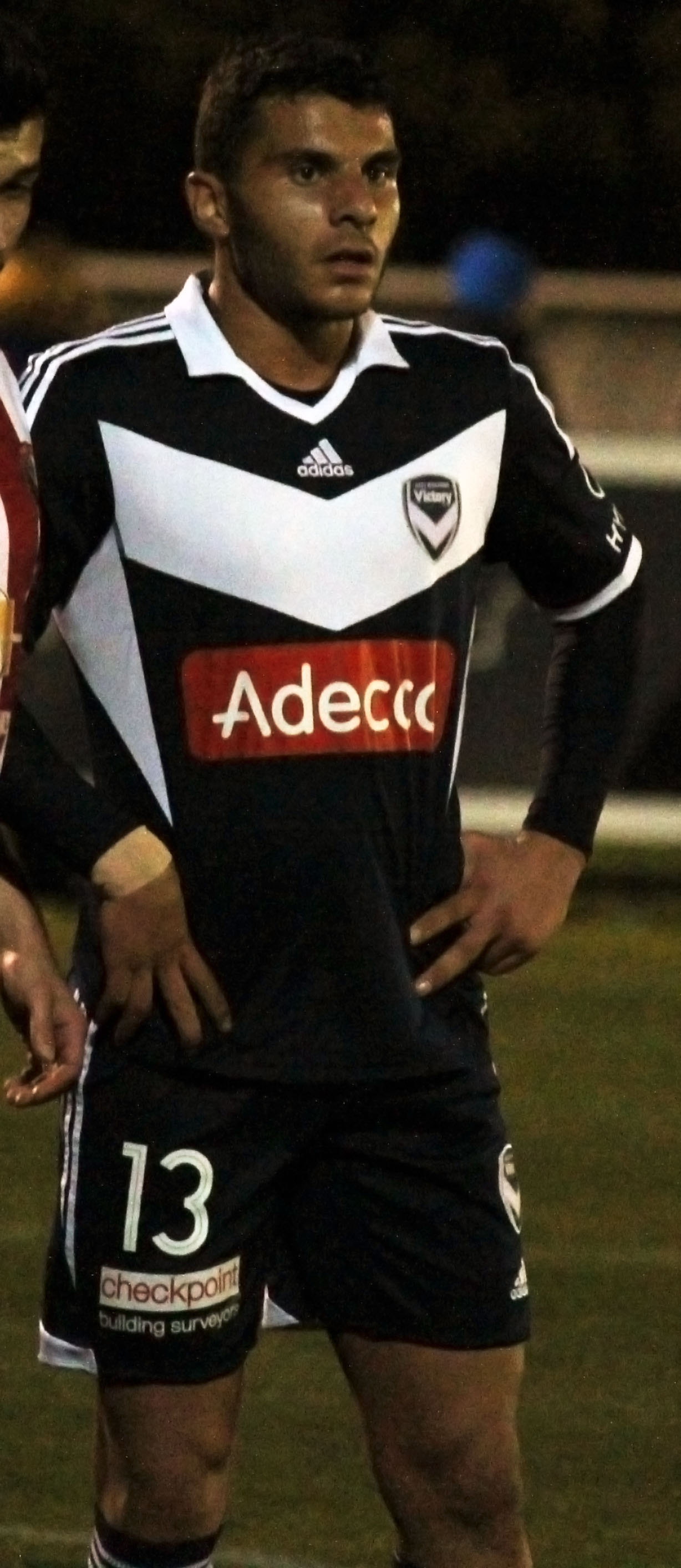
Nabbout with Melbourne Victory in 2014

Nabbout was granted number 13 for Melbourne, from 26, following Diogo Ferreira's departure to Brisbane Roar.

Nabbout's second season with Melbourne under new coach Kevin Muscat saw less game time than under Ange Postecoglou. Nabbout made a total of 19 appearances for the club, scoring one goal, in Melbourne's one all draw against Newcastle Jets on 10 January 2014, and gave two goal assists in other matches, logging a total of 462 minutes.

His most notable moment of the 2014 AFC Champions League include his contribution to securing Melbourne's second goal in the club's 2–0 victory over champions Guangzhou Evergrande on 15 April 2014, with teammates James Troisi the scorer and Kosta Barbarouses the official assister.

==== 2014–15 season ====
Nabbout made his first league match day appearance starting on the bench for the Melbourne, in the round three clash against rivals Melbourne City, but was not used. Nabbout made his first competitive appearance in 2014–15 and debut in Cup football, against Perth Glory in the FFA Cup quarter finals on 29 October 2014. Nabbout came on as a substitute for Besart Berisha in the 44th minute following a groin injury, with the game finishing in a 4–2 loss for after extra time. He was released by Melbourne Victory on 23 May 2015.

=== Malaysia ===
==== 2016 season ====
It was announced in early December 2015, that Nabbout would sign for Negeri Sembilan FA in the Malaysian Premier League for the 2016 Malaysia Premier League season, linking up with former National Soccer League winning coach Gary Phillips and several former A-League players. During his stay in Negeri Sembilan, Nabbout emerges as the top scorer of his team with 9 goals in 14 competitive games. Despite his impressive record Nabbout had his contract terminated mid-season as the club wanted to bring in new attacking players.

=== Newcastle Jets ===
==== 2016–17 season ====
After half a Season with Negeri Sembilan, Nabbout returned to Australia and joined Newcastle Jets on 19 July 2016. Nabbout made his Newcastle debut in a 3–1 FFA Cup Loss to his former club Melbourne Victory in which he played a full game.

But he had a slow start to the season with his new club as he didn't manage to score until Round 6. In January Nabbout was awarded the Professional Footballers Australia Player of the Month and was labeled a strong candidate for the Johnny Warren Medal and was also being talked about as a possible selection in Ange Postecoglous Australian squad for the upcoming 2018 FIFA World Cup qualifiers later that year. However that was not to be after a brace against Melbourne City in a 2–1 win later that month at the C.ex Coffs International Stadium Nabbout's form dwindled and so did the team, he did not manage to score again that season and all talk of an international debut was gone.

In Round 27 that Season against Sydney FC at the Sydney Football Stadium which also happened to be the last game of the season, Newcastle were sitting in last place on the A League ladder heading into the match and they required a win or a draw to avoid the wooden spoon. The Jets started the game off strongly in defence before Andrew Hoole was brought down in Sydney's box in the 40th minute earning the Jets a penalty. Nabbout stepped up and took the penalty before putting it wide of the right post. Sydney then proceeded to score two second half goals handing the Jets their third wooden spoon in club history, bringing an end to Nabbout's first season with Newcastle.

At the annual Newcastle Jets Awards Night later that month, Nabbout won the Jets Golden Boot with eight goals and the Ray Baartz Medal.

==== 2017–18 season ====
Two days before Nabbout and the Newcastle Jets played their first match of the 2017–18 pre-season, news was released that UAE Pro-League side Al-Dhafra had approached Newcastle with a big money transfer offer for Nabbout, However, it was reported that Newcastle refused the offer as the transfer amount was not as high as they wanted. The following day Jets CEO Lawrie McKinna stated to local media that Newcastle had not received any offer whatsoever or that they would not consider $650,000 AUD for the transfer. McKinna then went on to say that no talks had taken place but Al-Dhafra had expressed interest four weeks earlier and the transfer amount was acceptable.

With the transfer talk behind him, Nabbout went on to have his strongest pre-season, scoring 8 goals, including two hat-tricks. He also later stated that he had also set a goal for the season to reach double digits in both goals and assists, a feat he had not achieved in his career.

On 27 November, after impressing new coach Ernie Merrick in the first 9 rounds having scored 4 goals 2 of which were braces in addition to 3 assists, Nabbout signed a two-year contract extension with the Jets keeping him at the club until the completion of the 2019–20 Season.

Even after leaving Newcastle Jets and the A-League more than a month earlier at the annual 2018 A-League Awards Night; The Dolan Warren Awards, Nabbout Won 'Goal of the Year' for his Outside of the Boot Goal against the Western Sydney Wanderers in Round 20.

=== Urawa Red Diamonds ===
==== 2018 season ====
On 5 March 2018, Nabbout departed Newcastle Jets to join Japanese club Urawa Red Diamonds for a reportedly expected $500,000 transfer fee. Nabbout made his Urawa debut in Round 5 of the 2018 J1 League season against Jubilo Iwata. He was a 70th-minute substitute as Urawa lost 2–1. Nabbout made his starting debut and played a full match for Urawa three days later in Round 3 of the J.League Cup.

After Former Kashima Antlers and veteran Brazilian Coach Oswaldo de Oliveira was appointed as the new head coach of Urawa in April, Nabbout was dropped from the matchday squad along with two other foreign players for their match against Consadole Sapporo which was interim coach Tsuyoshi Otsuki's last match for the club before Oliveira took over the head coaching position. In Oliveira's debut match as head coach of Urawa, Nabbout was recalled back to the matchday squad in a 1–0 loss against Kashiwa Reysol. Nabbout started on the bench and was an unused substitute at full time.

In Round 12 against Kawasaki Nabbout made his J1 League starting debut in a 2–0 win for Urawa. Nabbout set up Japan striker Shinzo Koroki for Urawa's second goal of the match before coming off in the 75th minute for Quenten Martinus, this assist was Nabbout's first assist for Urawa in all competitions.

=== Return to Melbourne Victory ===
==== 2019–20 season ====
In July 2019, after scoring one goal in 16 appearances with Urawa Red Diamonds, Nabbout returned to Australia's A-League, signing a one-year contract with Melbourne Victory. On 28 January 2020, he scored the only goal in a shock 1-0 win over the Kashima Antlers in an AFC Champions League qualifying play-off. This qualified the Victory for the 2020 AFC Champions League where they reached the round of 16.

=== Melbourne City ===
==== 2020–21 season ====
It was announced on 1 September that Nabbout would join Perth Glory FC for the upcoming 2020–21 season set to start in December 2020. He signed a two-year contract with the 2019 finalists. On 23 September, however, it was announced that we will not be joining Perth due to CBA and relocation issues. The next day it was announced that Nabbout joined rivals Melbourne City on a one-year deal.

== International career ==
On 27 August 2013, it was confirmed that Lebanon national team coach Giuseppe Giannini had offered Nabbout a place in the national team to boost their attacking squad, being possible through his personal heritage. Nabbout declined the offer, in hopes that he could make the Australia national team, to make an appearance in Brazil for the 2014 FIFA World Cup. Despite this, coach Ange Postecoglou did not select him in the squad for the World Cup, making it still possible for Nabbout to play for Lebanon.

In March 2018, Nabbout was named in the Australia squad for the friendlies against Norway and Colombia. Nabbout started his first international friendly against Norway on 24 March 2018. He played as a striker before coming off in the 67th minute for Tomi Juric as Australia lost the match 4–1. Nabbout started in Australia's second friendly four days later, a 0–0 draw against Colombia. He played on the left wing and earned praise for his performance before being brought off in the 73rd Minute for Robbie Kruse.

Two months later, in May, Nabbout was selected for the preliminary squad for the 2018 FIFA World Cup in Russia. The following week, Bert van Marwijk announced a cut-down squad of 26 players. Nabbout and former Newcastle Jets teammate Dimitri Petratos survived the cut.

On 1 June 2018, Nabbout scored his first international goal in Australia's 4–0 victory over Czech Republic. Nabbout was selected for Australia's final 23-man squad for the tournament. Nabbout made his FIFA World Cup debut against France on 16 June 2018. Nabbout also started against Denmark on 21 June 2018 but was substituted in the 75th minute for Tomi Juric after he dislocated his shoulder.

== Career statistics ==
=== Club ===
As of 3 June 2024

Club	Season	Division	League		Cup		League Cup		Continental		Other		Total	
Club	Season	Division	Apps	Goals	Apps	Goals	Apps	Goals	Apps	Goals	Apps	Goals	Apps	Goals
Sunshine George Cross	2010	Victorian Premier League	16	0	—		—		—		—		16	0
Heidelberg United	2011	Victorian Premier League	21	1	1	0	—		—		—		22	1
Heidelberg United	2012	Victorian Premier League	11	2	1	3	—		—		—		12	5
Heidelberg United	Total		32	3	2	3	0	0	0	0	0	0	34	6
Moreland Zebras	2012	Victorian Premier League	8	0	—		—		—		—		8	0
Melbourne Victory	2012–13	A-League	21	4	—		—		—		—		21	4
Melbourne Victory	2013–14	A-League	14	1	—		—		5	0	—		19	1
Melbourne Victory	2014–15	A-League	5	0	1	0	—		—		—		6	0
Melbourne Victory	Total		40	5	1	0	0	0	5	0	0	0	46	5
Negeri Sembilan FA	2016	Malaysia Premier League	12	8	2	1	—		—		—		14	9
Newcastle Jets	2016–17	A-League	24	8	1	0	—		—		—		25	8
Newcastle Jets	2017–18	A-League	22	10	1	0	—		—		—		23	10
Newcastle Jets	Total		46	18	4	1	0	0	0	0	0	0	48	18
Urawa Red Diamonds	2018	J1 League	12	0	1	0	2	0	—		—		15	0
Urawa Red Diamonds	2019	J1 League	8	1	1	0	0	0	4	0	1	0	14	1
Urawa Red Diamonds	Total		20	1	2	0	2	0	4	0	1	0	29	1
Melbourne Victory	2019–20	A-League	22	8	1	2	—		4	1	—		27	11
Melbourne City	2020–21	A-League Men	17	3	—		—		—		—		17	3
Melbourne City	2021–22	A-League Men	28	5	2	0	—		5	2	—		35	7
Melbourne City	2022–23	A-League Men	28	3	1	0	—		—		—		29	3
Melbourne City	2023–24	A-League Men	10	0	1	0	—		0	0	—		11	0
Melbourne City	Total		83	11	4	0	0	0	5	2	0	0	92	13
Career total			279	54	14	6	2	0	18	3	1	0	314	63

=== International ===
As of 25 January 2019

Year	Apps	Goals
2018	8	2
2019	1	0
2021	1	0
Total	10	2

Australia score listed first, score column indicates score after each Nabbout goal.

International goals by date, venue, cap, opponent, score, result and competition
No.	Date	Venue	Opponent	Score	Result	Competition
1	1 June 2018	NV Arena, Sankt Pölten, Austria	Czech Republic	2–0	4–0	Friendly
2	30 December 2018	Maktoum bin Rashid Al Maktoum Stadium, Dubai, United Arab Emirates	Oman	1–0	5–0	Friendly

== Honours ==
Melbourne Victory

- A-League Premiership: 2014–15
- A-League Championship: 2014-15

Urawa Red Diamonds

- Emperor's Cup: 2018

Melbourne City

- A-League Premiership: 2020–21, 2021–22, 2022–23
- A-League Championship: 2020–21, 2024–25

Individual

- A-League Goal of the Year: 2017–18
- PFA A-League Team of the Season: 2017–18
