= Devante Clut =

Australian soccer player (born 1995)

Personal information
- Full name: Devante Autupuna Clut
- Date of birth: 16 October 1995 (age 31)
- Place of birth: Sydney, New South Wales, Australia
- Height: 1.75 m (5 ft 9 in)
- Position: Central midfielder

Youth career
- 2012–2013: Parramatta FC

Senior career*
Years	Team	Apps	(Gls)
2013	Parramatta FC	17	(4)
2013–2014	Newcastle Jets	0	(0)
2014–2016	Brisbane Roar	16	(2)
2014	Brisbane Roar NPL	8	(0)
2016–2018	Newcastle Jets	22	(1)
2018–2019	Blacktown City	45	(2)
2020–2023	Sydney United	72	(6)
2024	Bankstown City	22	(0)

International career^{‡}
2014	Australia U20	3	(1)
2017–2018	Australia U23	2	(1)
- * Club domestic league appearances and goals as of 20 February 2025 ‡ National team caps and goals as of 23 July 2017

Devante Clut (born 16 October 1995) is an Australian football player who last played as a midfielder for Bankstown City Lions.

== Career ==
=== Nike The Chance ===
In July 2012, Devante Clut was one of three chosen from the Chance Pacific Finals to compete in the world finals of Nike The Chance in Barcelona Spain.

=== Parramatta FC ===
In December 2012, Devante Clut signed his first senior contract with NPL NSW 2 club Parramatta FC after gaining multiple interests from other NSW clubs.

On 24 March 2013, he made his senior debut for Parramatta against Mt Druitt Rangers.

On 5 May 2013, He scored his first senior goal in a 5–0 win against Bankstown City FC.

=== Brisbane Roar ===
In October 2013, Devante Clut signed a professional youth contract for Brisbane Roar. On 24 January 2014, Clut made his professional debut for Brisbane Roar, in the 2–1 home victory against Wellington Phoenix. Clut started the match and in the 49th minute scored a volley from outside the box. He has continued to perform consistently for the club throughout the 2014–15 A-League National Youth League, scoring 8 goals in 16 appearances in that competition. Clut made his 2014–15 debut against the Suwon Bluewings where he scored two brilliant out-of-the-box strikes to draw the match at 3–3. Clut went on to score one more goal in the A-League, a clinical finish in the Roar's 6–1 plundering of the Central Coast Mariners at Suncorp Stadium.

On 3 June 2015, in a friendly match against Spanish side Villarreal, Devante scored a brace including a superb strike, reminiscent of that of Loïc Rémy's strike against Sydney FC the previous day.

=== Newcastle Jets ===
On 28 April 2016, Clut signed a two-year deal with the Newcastle Jets. Clut scored his first A-League goal for the Newcastle Jets on 16 October 2016 against his former club, Brisbane Roar, on his 21st birthday.

On 9 February 2018, after having a hard time making the starting squad, Clut and Newcastle Jets mutually terminated his contract to allow him to join Blacktown City in the NPL NSW.

=== Blacktown City ===
==== 2018 ====
On 12 February 2018, Clut joined Blacktown City after departing Newcastle Jets. Clut made his debut against Wollongong Wolves, coming on in the second half. Clut scored his first goal for the club on 24 March 2018 against Bonnyrigg White Eagles in the 22nd minute. After an influential season, Clut finished the season with 23 appearances and 2 goals qualifying for the Elimination Final where Blacktown lost 2-0 to Rockdale Ilinden.

==== 2019 ====
Clut played in the 2019 season and started in the first five games of the season with two assists against Sydney Olympic in Round 3. After not making an appearance for nearly half the season, Clut was put on the bench in Round 20 against Wollongong Wolves, coming on late in the game, before eventually making it to the semi-finals and losing 7-3 to the eventual runners-up Sydney United. In September 2019, Clut left Blacktown City after only appearing 10 times during the 2019 campaign.

=== Sydney United ===
==== 2020 ====
On 16 November 2019, it was announced Clut signed a deal with Sydney United for the 2020 NPL NSW season. He made his Sydney United debut against former NSL rival Sydney Olympic losing 2-0 at full time. On 25 October, Clut made his first grand final appearance against Rockdale Ilinden. During the game, Clut received a yellow card in the 66th before being taken off for Adrian Vranic in the 75th minute who later equalised with a header. The game drew 3-3 after extra time, the match went to penalties with Sydney United eventually winning 4-3 on penalties after a save from Danijel Nizic.

==== 2021 ====
In the 2021 season of the NPL NSW, Clut made 17 appearances throughout the campaign and helped his side finish 3rd in the league but failed to help them qualify for the 2021 FFA Cup after losing 3-1 to Bankstown City Lions in the fourth round of the 2021 FFA Cup preliminary rounds. The league season was cancelled after 17 games due to ongoing lockdowns in Australia.

==== 2022 ====
Clut made 15 appearances in the 2022 campaign, with his side finishing 8th by the end of the league season making it the lowest finish since coming 9th in the 2012 NSW Premier League season.

Clut appeared once in the 2022 Australia Cup, coming off the bench in the semi-final against his former club Brisbane Roar. Clut was involved in the game winning goal scored by Glen Trifiro in the 105th minute, the match ended 3-2 after extra time and Sydney United qualified for the 2022 Australia Cup Final becoming the first NPL side to make it to the Australia Cup Final.

=== International ===
Devante made this first appearance for the Australia U20 side in Australia's 4–1 win against Bermuda in National Training Center Invitational.

== Honours ==
With Sydney United:

- National Premier Leagues NSW Championship: 2020
- Waratah Cup Champions: 2023

== Club career statistics ==
As of 1 January 2023

Club	Season	League^{1}		Cup		AFC^{2}		Total	
Club	Season	Apps	Goals	Apps	Goals	Apps	Goals	Apps	Goals
Parramatta FC	2013	17	4	—		—		17	4
Parramatta FC	Total	17	4	0	0	0	0	17	4
Brisbane Roar	2013–14	1	1	—		—		1	1
Brisbane Roar	2014–15	1	0	0	0	4	2	5	2
Brisbane Roar	2015–16	8	0	1	0	0	0	9	0
Brisbane Roar	Total	10	1	1	0	4	2	15	3
Newcastle Jets	2016–17	18	1	1	0	—		19	1
Newcastle Jets	2017–18	0	0	0	0	—		0	0
Newcastle Jets	Total	18	1	1	0	0	0	19	1
Blacktown City	2018	23	2	—		—		23	2
Blacktown City	2019	10	0	—		—		10	0
Blacktown City	Total	33	2	0	0	0	0	33	2
Sydney United	2020	13	3	—		—		13	3
Sydney United	2021	17	0	—		—		17	0
Sydney United	2022	15	0	1	0	—		16	0
Sydney United	Total	45	3	1	0	0	0	46	3
Career total		123	10	3	0	4	2	130	13

^{1} – includes final series statistics
^{2} – includes AFC Champions League and AFC Cup
