= Jason Hoffman =

Australian soccer player

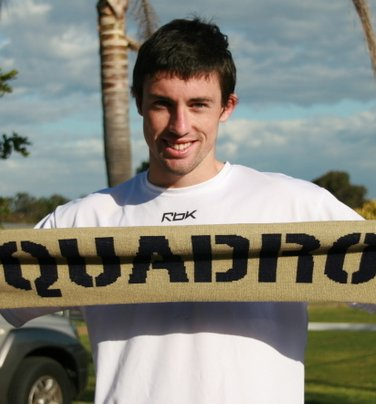
- Hoffman after signing for the Newcastle Jets in 2007

Personal information
- Full name: Jason Michael Hoffman
- Date of birth: 28 January 1989 (age 37)
- Place of birth: Newcastle, Australia
- Height: 1.89 m (6 ft 2 in)
- Positions: Right back; right wing; striker

Team information
- Current team: Newcastle Olympic
- Number: 28

Youth career
- Mayfield United
- Hamilton Olympic
- 2005–2006: NSWIS

Senior career*
Years	Team	Apps	(Gls)
2006–2007	Hamilton Olympic	13	(7)
2007–2010	Newcastle Jets	29	(2)
2008	AIS	4	(2)
2010	Richmond SC	6	(3)
2010–2015	Melbourne City	80	(3)
2015–2024	Newcastle Jets	191	(14)
2024	Newcastle Olympic	9	(5)

International career^{‡}
2007–2009	Australia U-20	11	(4)
2008–2012	Australia U-23	13	(9)
- * Club domestic league appearances and goals as of 6 January 2024 ‡ National team caps and goals as of 23 June 2011

Jason Hoffman (born 28 January 1989) is an Australian former association football player, most known for his time at the Newcastle Jets FC, where he holds the record for most appearances.

== Club career ==
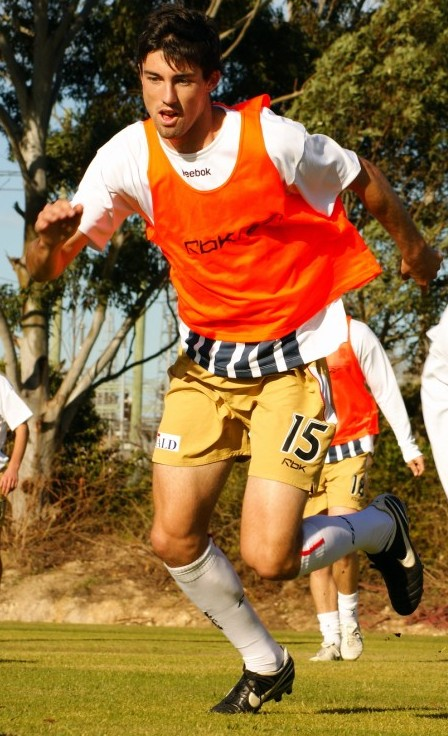
Hoffman training with the Newcastle Jets

Hoffman was developed through NSWIS and Hamilton Olympic Warriors FC. He started as trainee at the Newcastle Jets and became a part of the first team squad.

On 2 September 2007 he made his A-League debut for the Jets as a substitute in Round 2 of the 2007–08 season, and scored his first goal for the club on Matchday 6 of the Asian Champions League against Ulsan Hyundai.

Hoffman broke his 20 match goal drought in the A-League by scoring twice in the first half of the Jets 09/10 season opener against the Wellington Phoenix.

On 8 January 2010, he signed a two-year deal with Melbourne Heart.

After being released by Melbourne City in 2015, Hoffman returned to the Newcastle Jets on a one-year deal. He started in 25 of Newcastle's 27 league games that season and signed a two-year contract extension upon the conclusion of the 2015–16 A-League season.

In Round 24 of the 2017–18 A-League season Hoffman played his 100th A-League game for Newcastle but was sent off in the 78th Minute.

Known as something of a utility player, Hoffman began Newcastle's 2018–19 campaign as the club's center forward due to the 10-game ban of Roy O'Donovan that he incurred in the previous season's Grand Final. He started the first six games of the season and scored one goal, coming in a 2–0 win away to Western Sydney on 23 November, earning the club their first win of the season. Not fit for the game against Brisbane on 9 December, Hoffman returned the following week as a first half substitute at left-back for Ivan Vujica in their 2–0 defeat to league-leaders Perth. Hoffman remained in the side ahead of Vujica in Ernie Merrick's defense for their next game, the F3 Derby against Central Coast on 23 December. He leveled the score with a header in the second half and had a second header ruled out for offside as Newcastle would go on to win 2–1 through Ronald Vargas.

Hoffman retired from professional football at the end of the 2023–24 A-League season, finishing his career as the player with the most appearances in Newcastle Jets history. Following this, he returned to boyhood club Newcastle Olympic FC, making his second debut for the club on the 3rd of July 2024 against Lake Macquarie City FC, where he scored and got an assist before being substituted off in the 70th minute.

== Career statistics ==
As of Matches Played 15th August 2024

Appearances and goals by club, season and competition
Club	Season	League			Cup		Continental		Total	
Club	Season	Division	Apps	Goals	Apps	Goals	Apps	Goals	Apps	Goals
Newcastle Olympic FC	2006	Northern NSW State League			N/A					
Newcastle Olympic FC	2007	Northern NSW State League			N/A					
Newcastle Olympic FC	Newcastle Olympic Total		13	7	0	0	0	0	13	7
Newcastle Jets FC	2007-08	A-League Men	15	0	N/A		0	0	15	0
Newcastle Jets FC	2008-09	A-League Men	5	0	N/A		3	1	8	1
Newcastle Jets FC	2009-10	A-League Men	9	2	N/A		0	0	9	2
Newcastle Jets FC	Newcastle Jets Total		29	2	0	0	3	1	32	3
AIS	2008	Victorian Premier League	4	2	N/A				4	2
Richmond SC	2010	Victorian Premier League	6	3	N/A				6	3
	VPL Total		10	5	0	0	0	0	10	5
Melbourne City FC	2010-11	A-League Men	12	0	N/A		0	0	12	0
Melbourne City FC	2011-12	A-League Men	15	1	N/A		0	0	15	1
Melbourne City FC	2012-13	A-League Men	17	0	N/A		0	0	17	0
Melbourne City FC	2013-14	A-League Men	22	1	N/A		0	0	22	1
Melbourne City FC	2014-15	A-League Men	14	1	N/A		0	0	14	1
Melbourne City FC	Melbourne City Total		80	3	0	0	0	0	80	3
Newcastle Jets FC	2015-16	A-League Men	25	0	0	0	0	0	25	0
Newcastle Jets FC	2016-17	A-League Men	25	1	0	0	0	0	25	1
Newcastle Jets FC	2017-18	A-League Men	25	6	0	0	0	0	25	6
Newcastle Jets FC	2018-19	A-League Men	16	3	2	0	0	0	18	3
Newcastle Jets FC	2019-20	A-League Men	24	2	2	0	0	0	26	2
Newcastle Jets FC	2020-21	A-League Men	18	0	0	0	0	0	18	0
Newcastle Jets FC	2021-22	A-League Men	24	1	0	0	0	0	24	1
Newcastle Jets FC	2022-23	A-League Men	25	1	1	0	0	0	26	1
Newcastle Jets FC	2023-24	A-League Men	9	0	1	0	0	0	10	0
Newcastle Jets FC	Newcastle Jets Total		191	14	6	0	0	0	197	14
Newcastle Olympic FC	2024	National Premier Leagues Northern NSW	9	5	0	0	N/A		9	5
Newcastle Olympic FC	Newcastle Olympic Total		9	5	0	0	0	0	9	5
Career total			332	36	6	0	3	1	341	37

== Honours ==
With Australia:

- Weifang Cup (U-18): 2007

With Newcastle Jets:

- A-League Championship: 2007–2008
