= Ivan Vujica =

Australian footballer (born 1997)

Personal information
- Date of birth: 20 April 1997 (age 29)
- Place of birth: Prairiewood, New South Wales, Australia
- Height: 1.80 m (5 ft 11 in)
- Position: Left-back

Youth career
- 2007–2009: Southern Districts
- 2010–2011: Sydney United
- 2011: Sesvete
- 2011–2013: Lokomotiva Zagreb
- 2013–2016: Dinamo Zagreb

Senior career*
Years	Team	Apps	(Gls)
2016–2019	Newcastle Jets	46	(0)
2019–2022	Western United	12	(1)
2021	Western United NPL	6	(0)
2022–2025	Macarthur	65	(0)

International career^{‡}
2016	Croatia U19	1	(0)
2019	Australia U23	3	(0)
- * Club domestic league appearances and goals as of 5 February 2025 ‡ National team caps and goals as of 25 March 2019

Ivan Vujica (Croatian pronunciation: [ǐʋan ʋûjitsa]; born 20 April 1997) is an Australian professional footballer who plays as a left-back. He has represented Croatia at youth level, being capped once for their under-19 side, and has represented Australia at youth level, being capped for their under-23 side.

== Club career ==
=== Move to Croatia ===
Vujica departed Australia in 2011 to pursue a football career in Croatia, initially with NK Sesvete, before moving to GNK Dinamo Zagreb farm-side NK Lokomotiva Zagreb. In 2013, Vujica moved to Dinamo Zagreb.

=== Return to Australia ===
On 4 July 2016, Vujica signed a two-year contract with Newcastle Jets. Vujica made his professional debut in the first round of the 2016–17 A-League, coming on as a substitute for Daniel Mullen in a 1–1 draw with Adelaide United. He went on to make 10 starts that season but struggled to make the left back spot his own in the starting 11, He finished his first season in professional football with a combined total of 865 minutes.

==== 2017–18 ====
Vujica had a strong pre-season, catching the eye of new coach Ernie Merrick along the way. In Round 1 of that season against the Central Coast Mariners Vujica just edged past seasoned veteran Jason Hoffman for the starting left back spot. Following strong performances in the first three rounds, he signed a new two-year deal on 29 October 2017. As the season progressed, Vujica emerged as one of Newcastle's biggest talents for the future.

=== Western United ===
On 23 June 2019, Vujica signed a two-year deal with new A-League club Western United following mutually terminating his contract with Newcastle Jets in the search for more game time.

== International career ==
Vujica was called up to the Croatia Under-19 side for a UEFA European Under-19 Championship qualifier against Kazakhstan. He participated in a narrow 1–0 victory.

== Honours ==
Macarthur

- Australia Cup: 2022
