= Joel Allwright =

Australian professional footballer

Personal information
- Date of birth: 4 March 1988 (age 38)
- Place of birth: Adelaide, Australia
- Height: 1.80 m (5 ft 11 in)
- Positions: Full-back; winger

Team information
- Current team: Campbelltown City
- Number: 7

Youth career
- 2000–2003: Para Hills Knights
- 2004–2005: SASI
- 2006: AIS
- 2008–2010: Adelaide United

Senior career*
Years	Team	Apps	(Gls)
2007–2010	Para Hills Knights	65	(24)
2012–2016	Adelaide City	124	(42)
2017	Newcastle Jets	2	(0)
2017–2018	Adelaide City	39	(3)
2019–	Campbelltown City	130	(7)

International career^{‡}
2005	Australia U17		
- * Club domestic league appearances and goals as of 9 September 2024 ‡ National team caps and goals as of 13 March 2017

Joel Allwright (born 4 March 1988) is an Australian professional footballer who plays as a full-back or winger for Campbelltown City in the National Premier Leagues.

Allwright was born in Adelaide and played youth football for South Australian and Australian Institutes of Sport as well as Adelaide United. He started his senior career with Para Hills Knights, where he had played junior football, in the South Australian Super League, before moving to Adelaide City in 2012. In 2017, he joined Newcastle Jets.

Allwright appeared for the Australian under-17 side in 2005, including at the 2005 FIFA World Youth Championship.

== Playing career ==
=== Club ===
In 2007, Allwright travelled to Scotland for a trial with Dundee United.

Allwright signed with Newcastle Jets from Adelaide City in January 2017 on a mature-aged rookie contract until the end of the 2016–17 season. He made his debut in a draw in an F3 Derby against Central Coast Mariners on 26 February 2017. He returned to Adelaide City at the end of the Jets' season.

== Honours ==
=== Club ===
Adelaide City

- National Premier Leagues South Australia Premiership: 2017
- FFSA Federation Cup: 2013, 2014

=== Country ===
Australia

- OFC U-17 Championship: 2005
