= Kristian Brymora =

Australian professional football player

Personal information
- Full name: Kristian Brymora
- Date of birth: 23 October 1998 (age 28)
- Place of birth: Newcastle, Australia
- Position: Forward

Team information
- Current team: Gold Coast Knights
- Number: 14

Youth career
- 2013–2016: Newcastle Jets

Senior career*
Years	Team	Apps	(Gls)
2016–2017	Newcastle Jets NPL	24	(18)
2016–2017	Newcastle Jets	1	(0)
2017	Lambton Jaffas	2	(1)
2017–2018	Millwall	0	(0)
2018–2019	Hässleholms IF	19	(10)
2019	Broadmeadow Magic	20	(3)
2020	Green Gully	5	(0)
2020–2021	Edgeworth	20	(13)
2022–	Gold Coast Knights	12	(7)
- * Club domestic league appearances and goals as of 21 September 2022

Kristian Brymora (born 23 October 1998) is an Australian professional football player who plays for Australian National Premier Leagues Queensland side Gold Coast Knights FC.

== Club career ==
=== 2016–17 ===
Brymora made his professional debut for the Newcastle Jets on 3 August 2017 in a 3–1 FFA Cup loss to the Melbourne Victory coming off the bench in the 67th minute.

After one season with the youth team Brymora was invited along with a number of the youth side's players to train with the senior side before that was whittled down to a first-team squad that would travel to China for a pre-season tour which included Brymora. Brymora scored his first goal for Newcastle in their second game of the tour in a 2–1 win over Hong Kong side Eastern. On 21 September, Brymora signed a professional one-year contract with Newcastle for the upcoming 2016–17 season.

Brymora made his A-League debut on 10 December coming on late and playing the last 6 minutes in a historic 2–1 win for the Jets against Perth Glory away at NIB Stadium in the Round 10 match. Brymora ended his first professional season with only 6 minutes in the league under his belt.

=== 2017–18 ===
Newcastle told Brymora he could continue training with the side and push for a new contract under new coach Ernie Merrick but he decided to leave the club to try to push for a contract in either England or Poland. Before Brymora left Australia he signed a short-term contract with Newcastle club Lambton Jaffas to keep in shape before departing to Europe a few weeks later. He played one game for the Jaffas coming off the bench and scoring in a 5–0 thumping of Weston Bears before departing to Europe a few days later. On 31 August 2017, Byrmora signed for EFL Championship club Millwall F.C. It didn’t take him long to make an impact on the pitch, scoring the winner against Sheffield United and then one in the last minute against South London rivals Crystal Palace to seal three Development League points.

He was released by Millwall at the end of the 2017–18 season.

In May 2018, Brymora joined Swedish Division 2 side Hässleholms IF.
