= Andrew Hoole =

Australian soccer player

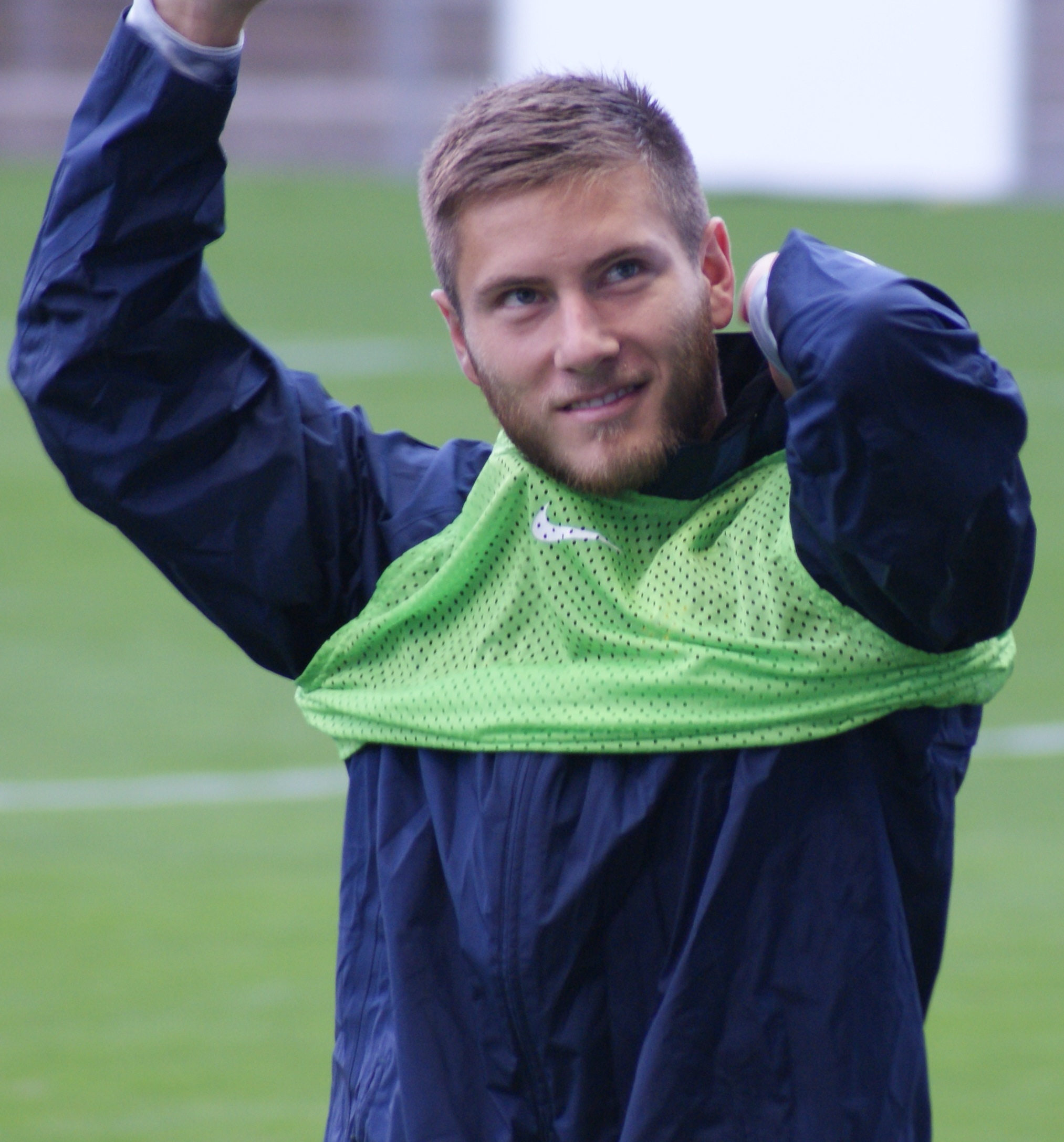
- Andrew Hoole at the Young Socceroos vs New Zealand match

Personal information
- Full name: Andrew James Hoole
- Date of birth: 22 October 1993 (age 33)
- Place of birth: Newcastle, Australia
- Height: 1.78 m (5 ft 10 in)
- Position: Winger

Youth career
- –2011: Broadmeadow Magic
- 2011–2013: Newcastle Jets

Senior career*
Years	Team	Apps	(Gls)
2011	Broadmeadow Magic	14	(4)
2012	Newcastle Jets NPL	13	(2)
2013–2015	Newcastle Jets	50	(1)
2015–2016	Sydney FC	15	(0)
2016–2017	Newcastle Jets	26	(5)
2017–2019	Central Coast Mariners	45	(8)
2019	Broadmeadow Magic	3	(0)

International career
2012–2013	Australia U-20	6	(0)
2014–2016	Australia U-23	16	(4)
- * Club domestic league appearances and goals

Andrew James Hoole (born 22 October 1993) is an Australian semi-professional football (soccer) player who last played as a winger for Broadmeadow Magic in the National Premier Leagues Northern NSW.

== Club career ==
=== Newcastle Jets ===
Hoole earned his first call up for the Jets after impressing in the Newcastle Jets Youth League squad. Hoole played his first game on 12 January 2013 in a round 15 game against the Brisbane Roar. Hoole made a strong debut for the Jets and made a big contribution towards their 1–0 win. Just days after making his A-League debut Hoole signed a one-year senior contract with Newcastle. During the 13/14 season Hoole was voted Player of the Season. On 17 April 2015, he scored his first ever career goal, a penalty, against Sydney FC.

=== Sydney FC ===
On 30 April 2015 it was announced he had signed with A-League side Sydney FC on a two-year deal, after 3 successful seasons with Newcastle Jets.

Hoole's contract was terminated by mutual consent on 20 June 2016, one year early in order to pursue other opportunities.

=== Return to Newcastle Jets ===
Following Hoole's release from Sydney FC, he returned to Newcastle Jets, signing a one-year contract. In his third game on return for the Jets he got an assist and scored a late free kick to salvage a comeback from 2–0 down to draw 2–2 against the Western Sydney Wanderers.

=== Central Coast Mariners ===
Despite announcements to go play in Europe, on 31 May 2017, Hoole signed a two-year contract with Central Coast Mariners. On 14 October 2017, he was shown a red card in his first game. During his time there, he scored eight league goals, including two free kicks in a 3–2 loss to Melbourne Victory in 2019.

=== Broadmeadow Magic ===
In 2019, Hoole signed for Broadmeadow Magic in the Australian National Premier Leagues Northern NSW, making his first match debut in 0–0 draw with Edgeworth.

== Career statistics ==
=== Club ===
As of match played 26 April 2019

Club	Season	League			Cup		Continental		Total	
Club	Season	Division	Apps	Goals	Apps	Goals	Apps	Goals	Apps	Goals
Newcastle Jets	2012–13	A-League	8	0	—		—		8	0
Newcastle Jets	2013–14	A-League	18	0	—		—		18	0
Newcastle Jets	2014–15	A-League	24	1	0	0	—		24	1
Newcastle Jets	Total		50	1	0	0	—		50	1
Sydney FC	2015–16	A-League	15	0	2	0	6	0	17	0
Newcastle Jets	2016–17	A-League	26	5	0	0	—		26	5
Central Coast Mariners	2017–18	A-League	23	4	1	0	—		24	4
Central Coast Mariners	2018–19	A-League	23	4	0	0	—		23	4
Central Coast Mariners	Total		46	8	1	0	—		47	8
Career total			136	14	2	0	6	0	144	14

== Honours ==
Personal

- Newcastle Jets Player of the Year – 2014–15
- Ray Baartz Medal – 2014–15
