= Ma Leilei =

Chinese footballer

Ma Leilei 马磊磊
Personal information
- Date of birth: March 22, 1989 (age 37)
- Place of birth: Tianjin, China
- Height: 1.80 m (5 ft 11 in)
- Position: Midfielder

Youth career
- 2002–2008: Tianjin Locomotive

Senior career*
Years	Team	Apps	(Gls)
2008–2012	Tianjin Teda	37	(2)
2013–2014	Qingdao Jonoon	4	(0)
2014	→ Meizhou Wuhua (loan)	9	(1)
2015	Tianjin TEDA	0	(0)
2016	Cova da Piedade	0	(0)
2016–2017	Newcastle Jets	15	(1)
Medal record
Representing China
Men's football
AFC U-17 Championship
Gold medal – first place	2004 Japan	Team
- * Club domestic league appearances and goals as of 24 April 2017

Ma Leilei (simplified Chinese: 马磊磊; traditional Chinese: 馬磊磊; pinyin: Mǎ Lěilěi; born March 22, 1989, in Tianjin) is a Chinese former footballer who last played for Newcastle Jets in the A-League.

== Club career ==
Ma Leilei joined top tier side Tianjin TEDA in July 2008 and would make his debut for the club on September 21, 2008, in a league game against Shanghai Shenhua in a 1–1 draw where he came on as a substitute. After that game Ma would start to become a regular within the side and would go on to score his first two senior level goals in a 2009 AFC Champions League game on May 5, 2009, against Kawasaki Frontale in a 3–1 victory. After that game he was soon touted as the successor of club legend and former Chinese international Yu Genwei. In October 2016 he joined Australian club Newcastle Jets as part of owner Martin Lee's request that there will be Chinese players at the Jets.

Ma confirmed his retirement in March 2020.

== Career statistics ==
=== Club ===
Club performance			League		Cup		League Cup		Continental		Total	
Season	Club	League	Apps	Goals	Apps	Goals	Apps	Goals	Apps	Goals	Apps	Goals
China PR			League		FA Cup		CSL Cup		Asia		Total	
2008	Tianjin TEDA	Chinese Super League	9	0	-		-		-		9	0
2009	Tianjin TEDA	Chinese Super League	20	2	0	0	-		3	2	23	4
2010	Tianjin TEDA	Chinese Super League	1	0	0	0	-		1	0	2	0
2011	Tianjin TEDA	Chinese Super League	5	0	0	0	-		2	0	7	0
2012	Tianjin TEDA	Chinese Super League	2	0	0	0	-		-		2	0
2013	Qingdao Jonoon	Chinese Super League	4	0	0	0	-		-		4	0
2014	Meizhou Wuhua	China League Two	9	1	0	0	-		-		9	1
2015	Tianjin TEDA	Chinese Super League	0	0	0	0	-		-		0	0
Portugal			League		Taça de Portugal		Taça da Liga		Europe		Total	
2016–17	Cova da Piedade	LigaPro	0	0	0	0	-		-		0	0
Australia			League		cup		League cup		Asia		Total	
2016–17	Newcastle Jets	A-League	15	1	0	0	-		-		15	1
Total	China PR		50	3	0	0	0	0	6	2	56	5
Total	Portugal		0	0	0	0	0	0	0	0	0	0
Total	Australia		15	1	0	0	0	0	0	0	15	1
Career total			65	4	0	0	0	0	6	2	71	6

== Honours ==
=== International ===
China U-17

- AFC U-17 Championship: 2004
