= Tomislav Arčaba =

Australian soccer player

Tomi Arčaba
Personal information
- Full name: Tomislav Arčaba
- Date of birth: 25 March 1986 (age 40)
- Place of birth: Wollongong, Australia
- Height: 1.87 m (6 ft 2 in)
- Position: Goalkeeper

Youth career
- 1998–2001: Coniston Condors

Senior career*
Years	Team	Apps	(Gls)
2002–2006	Wollongong Wolves		
2007	Sligo Rovers	7	(0)
2008–2009	Gloria Buzău	9	(0)
2009–2010	Internaţional	4	(0)
2011–2012	BSK Borča	4	(0)
2014–2015	Rockdale City Suns	24	(0)
2015–2016	OFK Beograd	0	(0)
2017	Newcastle Jets	2	(0)
2020	Rockdale City Suns	2	(0)

International career^{‡}
	Australia U20	1	(0)
- * Club domestic league appearances and goals as of 2 November 2020 ‡ National team caps and goals as of 2 November 2020

Tomislav Arčaba (born 25 March 1986) is an Australian professional soccer player who plays as a goalkeeper.

== Club career ==
After playing with Wollongong Wolves until 2006, first in the NSL then since 2004 in the NSW Premier League, he signed in January 2007 with Irish club Sligo Rovers FC. After playing with Sligo Rovers in the 2007 League of Ireland he moved in January 2008 to Romanian club FC Gloria Buzău. After a season and a half he moved to another Liga I club, FC Internaţional Curtea de Argeş. In January 2011 he leaves Romania and signes with Serbian club FK BSK Borča where he played until summer 2012.

Arcaba signed a six-month deal with Newcastle Jets in January 2017.

In 2020, he returned to Australia and played for Rockdale City Suns FC for 2020 NPL NSW.

== International career ==
He is a former Australian U-20 international.
