= 2012–13 Newcastle Jets FC season =

Newcastle Jets FC
2012–2013 season
- Chairman: Ray Baartz
- Manager: Gary van Egmond
- A-League: 8th
- Top goalscorer: Emile Heskey; Ryan Griffiths (9)
- Highest home attendance: 22,518 vs Western Sydney Wanderers; 29 March 2013
- Lowest home attendance: 8,310 vs Brisbane Roar; 22 February 2013
- Average home league attendance: 13,389
Home colours	Away colours

The 2012–13 season is Newcastle Jets' eighth consecutive season in the A-League since its foundation season in 2005–2006.

== Players ==
=== Senior squad ===
Note: Flags indicate national team as defined under FIFA eligibility rules; some limited exceptions apply. Players may hold more than one non-FIFA nationality.

No.	Pos.	Nation	Player
1	GK	AUS	Ben Kennedy
2	DF	AUS	Scott Neville
3	MF	AUS	Zenon Caravella
4	DF	AUS	Josh Mitchell
5	DF	SUI	Dominik Ritter
6	MF	AUS	Ben Kantarovski
7	MF	AUS	James Brown
8	MF	AUS	Ruben Zadkovich (Captain)
9	FW	ENG	Emile Heskey
10	MF	BRA	Bernardo Ribeiro
11	DF	AUS	Connor Chapman
12	MF	AUS	Joshua Brillante
13	DF	AUS	Sam Gallaway

No.	Pos.	Nation	Player
14	DF	AUS	Taylor Regan
15	MF	AUS	Craig Goodwin
17	FW	AUS	James Virgili
18	MF	AUS	Jacob Pepper
19	FW	ENG	Michael Bridges
20	GK	AUS	Mark Birighitti
21	FW	AUS	Marko Jesic
22	FW	AUS	Adam Taggart
23	FW	AUS	Ryan Griffiths (Vice-Captain)
24	MF	AUS	Mitchell Oxborrow (Youth)
25	MF	AUS	Mitch Cooper (Youth)
26	DF	AUS	Andrew Hoole
30	GK	AUS	Jack Duncan (Youth)

=== Youth squad ===
Note: Flags indicate national team as defined under FIFA eligibility rules; some limited exceptions apply. Players may hold more than one non-FIFA nationality.

No.	Pos.	Nation	Player
24	MF	AUS	Mitchell Oxborrow
25	MF	AUS	Mitch Cooper
30	GK	AUS	Jack Duncan
—	GK	AUS	Nicholas Hartnett
—	DF	AUS	Nick Cowburn
—	DF	AUS	Blake Green
—	DF	AUS	Mason Campbell
—	DF	AUS	Luke Remington
—	DF	AUS	Andrew Hoole

No.	Pos.	Nation	Player
—	MF	AUS	Bobby Russel
—	MF	AUS	Koh Satake
—	MF	AUS	Nicholas Pepper
—	MF	AUS	Michael Kantarovski
—	MF	AUS	Michael Finlayson
—	FW	AUS	Radovan Pavicevic
—	FW	AUS	Kale Bradbery
—	FW	AUS	Stevan Ilic

== Transfers ==
=== Summer ===
In: Note: Flags indicate national team as defined under FIFA eligibility rules; some limited exceptions apply. Players may hold more than one non-FIFA nationality.

No.	Pos.	Nation	Player
2	DF	AUS	Scott Neville (from (Australia) Perth Glory)
4	DF	AUS	Josh Mitchell (from (Australia) Perth Glory)
5	DF	SUI	Dominik Ritter (from (Switzerland) FC Winterthur)
7	MF	AUS	James Brown (from (Australia) Gold Coast United)
9	FW	ENG	Emile Heskey (from (England) Aston Villa)
10	MF	BRA	Bernardo Ribeiro (from (Turkey) Skënderbeu Korçë)
12	MF	AUS	Joshua Brillante (from (Australia) Gold Coast United)
15	DF	AUS	Craig Goodwin (from (Australia) Melbourne Heart)
20	GK	AUS	Mark Birighitti (from (Australia) Adelaide United)
22	FW	AUS	Adam Taggart (from (Australia) Perth Glory)
25	MF	AUS	Mitch Cooper (from (Australia) Gold Coast United)
27	MF	AUS	Chris Grossman (loan from (Australia) Moreland Zebras)
30	GK	MKD	Aleks Vrteski (loan from (Indonesia) Madiun FC)
33	GK	AUS	Matthew Nash (from (Australia) Parramatta FC)
—	FW	SCO	Mark Burchill (On Trial)

Out: Note: Flags indicate national team as defined under FIFA eligibility rules; some limited exceptions apply. Players may hold more than one non-FIFA nationality.

No.	Pos.	Nation	Player
3	DF	AUS	Mario Šimić (released, joined (Australia) Sydney United)
4	DF	AUS	Nikolai Topor-Stanley (released, joined (Australia) Western Sydney Wanderers)
7	MF	AUS	Kasey Wehrman (released)
8	FW	NZL	Jeremy Brockie (to (New Zealand) Wellington Phoenix)
11	DF	AUS	Tarek Elrich (released, joined (Australia) Western Sydney Wanderers)
13	DF	KOR	Byun Sung-Hwan (released, joined (South Korea) Seongnam Ilhwa Chunma)
14	FW	AUS	Labinot Haliti (released, joined (Australia) Western Sydney Wanderers)
19	GK	AUS	Matthew Nash (to (Australia) Parramatta FC)
22	MF	IRQ	Ali Abbas (to (Australia) Sydney FC)
24	FW	ENG	Francis Jeffers (released, joined (Malta) Floriana)

=== Winter ===
In: Note: Flags indicate national team as defined under FIFA eligibility rules; some limited exceptions apply. Players may hold more than one non-FIFA nationality.

No.	Pos.	Nation	Player
3	MF	AUS	Zenon Caravella (from (Australia) Adelaide United)

Out: Note: Flags indicate national team as defined under FIFA eligibility rules; some limited exceptions apply. Players may hold more than one non-FIFA nationality.

No.	Pos.	Nation	Player
3	DF	BRA	Tiago (to (Australia) Sydney FC)
23	FW	AUS	Ryan Griffiths (to (China) Beijing Baxy)
27	MF	AUS	Chris Grossman (loan return to (Australia) Moreland Zebras)
30	GK	MKD	Aleks Vrteski (loan return to (Indonesia) Madiun FC)
33	GK	AUS	Matthew Nash (to (Australia) Sydney FC)

== Competitions ==
=== Overall ===
Competition	Started round	Current position / round	Final position / round	First match	Last match
A-League	—	—	8th	7 October 2012	29 March 2013
National Youth League	—	—	3rd	21 October 2012	23 February 2013
W-League	—	—	7th	21 October 2012	13 January 2013

=== A-League ===
==== Results by round ====
Round	1	2	3	4	5	6	7	8	9	10	11	12	13	14	15	16	17	18	19	20	21	22	23	24	25	26	27
Ground	H	A	H	H	A	A	H	A	A	H	A	H	A	A	H	H	A	A	H	A	H	H	A	A	H	A	H
Result	L	W	W	W	L	W	L	D	L	L	L	W	L	L	D	W	D	D	D	L	W	D	W	L	L	D	L
Position	9	7	3	2	4	3	3	4	5	5	6	6	7	7	8	5	6	5	5	7	6	6	5	6	6	8	8

Updated to match(es) played on 2 April 2013. Source: Matches
A = Away; H = Home; W = Win; D = Draw; L = Loss

==== Results summary ====
Overall								Home						Away					
Pld	W	D	L	GF	GA	GD	Pts	W	D	L	GF	GA	GD	W	D	L	GF	GA	GD
27	8	7	12	29	45	−16	31	5	3	5	11	17	−6	3	4	7	18	28	−10

==== Results ====
7 October 2012 1	Newcastle Jets	0–2	Adelaide United	Newcastle
21:45 AWST (UTC+11)	Birighitti (red card) 56'	Summary	Vidošić 2'; Ramsay 75'	Stadium: Hunter Stadium; Attendance: 14,868; Referee: Shaun Evans

13 October 2012 2	Sydney FC	2–3	Newcastle Jets	Sydney
18:30 AEST (UTC+11)	Del Piero 26'; Powell 73'	Summary	Griffths 11'; Heskey 41'; Goodwin 62'	Stadium: Allianz Stadium; Attendance: 35,419; Referee: Chris Beath

20 October 2012 3	Newcastle Jets	2–1	Central Coast Mariners	Newcastle
18:30 AEST (UTC+11)	Griffiths 5' (pen.); Heskey 62'	Summary	Ibini-Isei 71'	Stadium: Hunter Stadium; Attendance: 15,289; Referee: Ben Williams

26 October 2012 4	Newcastle Jets	2–1	Melbourne Victory	Newcastle
20:30 AEST (UTC+11)	Heskey 54', 56'	Summary	Thompson 71'	Stadium: Hunter Stadium; Attendance: 13,912; Referee: Alan Milliner

3 November 2012 5	Perth Glory	3–2	Newcastle Jets	Perth
21:45 AEST (UTC+11)	McGarry 11'; Ward 38'; Harold 85'	Summary	Tiago 6'; Mitchell 71'	Stadium: nib Stadium; Attendance: 9,293; Referee: Alan Milliner

10 November 2012 6	Western Sydney Wanderers	1–2	Newcastle Jets	Sydney
17:30 AEST (UTC+11)	Gibbs 15'	Summary	Griffiths 28'; Heskey 38'; Pepper (yellow card) 84' (yellow-red card) 90'	Stadium: Parramatta Stadium; Attendance: 9,011; Referee: Brenton Haywood

18 November 2012 7	Newcastle Jets	0–3	Wellington Phoenix	Newcastle
15:00 AEST (UTC+11)		Summary	Brockie 44', 81'; Ifill 87' (pen.)	Stadium: Hunter Stadium; Attendance: 13,116; Referee: Chris Beath

24 November 2012 8	Melbourne Heart	3–3	Newcastle Jets	Melbourne
17:30 AEST (UTC+11)	Garcia 1', 71'; Tadić 5' (pen.)	Summary	Goodwin 56'; Zadkovich 63'; Griffiths 87'	Stadium: Epping Stadium; Attendance: 7,125; Referee: Jarred Gillett

1 December 2012 9	Brisbane Roar	1–0	Newcastle Jets	Brisbane
19:45 AEST (UTC+11)	Berisha 41' (pen.); ~~Broich (red card) 45'~~ (expunged)	Summary	Mitchell (yellow card) 40' (yellow-red card) 44'	Stadium: Suncorp Stadium; Attendance: 12,546; Referee: Brenton Haywood

8 December 2012 10	Newcastle Jets	0–2	Central Coast Mariners	Newcastle
19:45 AEST (UTC+11)		Summary	McBreen 49', 66'	Stadium: Hunter Stadium; Attendance: 13,122; Referee: Jarred Gillett

14 December 2012 11	Perth Glory	3–0	Newcastle Jets	Perth
21:45 AEST (UTC+11)	Dodd 45+1', 49'; Smeltz 75' (pen.)	Summary		Stadium: Patersons Stadium; Attendance: 6,967; Referee: Ben Williams

22 December 2012 12	Newcastle Jets	2–1	Sydney FC	Newcastle
17:30 AEST (UTC+11)	Goodwin 13'; Heskey 27'	Summary	Yau 32'	Stadium: Hunter Stadium; Attendance: 17,402; Referee: Strebre Delovski

29 December 2012 13	Melbourne Victory	3–2	Newcastle Jets	Melbourne
19:30 AEST (UTC+11)	Rojas 34', 74'; Thompson 45'	Summary	Zadkovich 64'; Heskey 73'	Stadium: AAMI Park; Attendance: 21,054; Referee: Kris Griffiths-Jones

1 January 2013 14	Melbourne Heart	2–1	Newcastle Jets	Melbourne
18:15 AEST (UTC+11)	Gerhardt 6'; Tadić 26' (pen.)	Summary	Griffiths 18' (pen.)	Stadium: AAMI Park; Attendance: 5,641; Referee: Chris Beath

5 January 2013 15	Newcastle Jets	0–0	Adelaide United	Newcastle
17:30 AEST (UTC+11)		Summary		Stadium: Hunter Stadium; Attendance: 10,721; Referee: Matthew Gillett

12 January 2013 16	Newcastle Jets	1–0	Brisbane Roar	Newcastle
19:45 AEST (UTC+11)	Griffiths 48'	Summary		Stadium: Hunter Stadium; Attendance: 10,164; Referee: Strebre Delovski

19 January 2013 17	Central Coast Mariners	0–0	Newcastle Jets	Gosford
17:00 AEST (UTC+11)		Summary		Stadium: Bluetongue Stadium; Attendance: 11,249; Referee: Alan Milliner

27 January 2013 18	Wellington Phoenix	1–1	Newcastle Jets	Wellington
14:30 AEST (UTC+11)	Fenton 21'; Lochhead (yellow card) 36' (yellow-red card) 72'	Summary	Gallaway (yellow card) 32' (yellow-red card) 54'; Heskey 74'	Stadium: Westpac Stadium; Attendance: 6,429; Referee: Ben Williams

2 February 2013 19	Newcastle Jets	2–2	Sydney FC	Newcastle
17:30 AEST (UTC+11)	Griffiths 16' (pen.), 89' (pen.)	Summary	Del Piero 12'; Powell 57'; McFlynn (red card) 87'	Stadium: Hunter Stadium; Attendance: 12,428; Referee: Jarred Gillett

9 February 2013 20	Western Sydney Wanderers	2–1	Newcastle Jets	Sydney
19:45 AEST (UTC+11)	Hersi 45'; Bridge 83'	Summary	Zadkovich 90'	Stadium: Parramatta Stadium; Attendance: 10,589; Referee: Peter Green

15 February 2013 21	Newcastle Jets	2–0	Melbourne Heart	Newcastle
19:30 AEST (UTC+11)	Heskey 10'; Griffiths 81'	Summary		Stadium: Hunter Stadium; Attendance: 11,396; Referee: Chris Beath

22 February 2013 22	Newcastle Jets	0–0	Brisbane Roar	Newcastle
19:30 AEST (UTC+11)		Summary		Stadium: Hunter Stadium; Attendance: 8,310; Referee: Lucien Laverdue

27 February 2013 23	Wellington Phoenix	1–2	Newcastle Jets	Wellington
15:00 AEST (UTC+11)	Brockie 60'	Summary	Taggart 19'; Bridges 44'	Stadium: Westpac Stadium; Referee: Kris Griffiths-Jones

3 March 2013 24	Melbourne Victory	5–0	Newcastle Jets	Melbourne
17:00 AEST (UTC+11)	Rojas 8', 65'; Leijer 15'; Milligan 30' (pen.), 57' (pen.)	Summary	Regan (yellow card) 30' (yellow-red card) 56'	Stadium: AAMI Park; Attendance: 17,778; Referee: Jarred Gillett

8 March 2013 25	Newcastle Jets	1–2	Perth Glory	Newcastle
19:30 AEST (UTC+11)	Taggart 45'	Summary	Córdoba 24'; Thwaite 90'	Stadium: Hunter Stadium; Attendance: 10,807; Referee: Adam Kersey

15 March 2013 26	Adelaide United	1–1	Newcastle Jets	Adelaide
19:30 AEST (UTC+11)	Carrusca 49'	Summary	Bridges 44'	Stadium: Hindmarsh Stadium; Attendance: 7,284; Referee: Lucien Laverdue

29 March 2013 27	Newcastle Jets	0–3	Western Sydney Wanderers	Newcastle
17:30 AEST (UTC+11)		Summary	Bridge 6', 33'; Visconte 80'	Stadium: Hunter Stadium; Attendance: 22,518; Referee: Ben Williams

==== League table ====
Pos	Team	Pld	W	D	L	GF	GA	GD	Pts	Qualification
1	Western Sydney Wanderers	27	18	3	6	41	21	+20	57	Qualification for 2014 AFC Champions League group stage and finals series
2	Central Coast Mariners (C)	27	16	6	5	48	22	+26	54	Qualification for 2014 AFC Champions League group stage and finals series
3	Melbourne Victory	27	13	5	9	48	45	+3	44	Qualification for 2014 AFC Champions League qualifying play-off and finals series (Note: Since the winner of 2013 A-League Grand Final (Central Coast Mariners) qualified for the 2014 AFC Champions League group stage, the 3rd placed team qualified for the qualifying play-off of 2014 AFC Champions League.)
4	Adelaide United	27	12	5	10	38	37	+1	41	Qualification for Finals series
5	Brisbane Roar	27	10	5	12	33	29	+4	35	Qualification for Finals series
6	Perth Glory	27	9	5	13	29	31	−2	32	Qualification for Finals series
7	Sydney FC	27	9	5	13	41	51	−10	32	
8	Newcastle Jets	27	8	7	12	30	45	−15	31	
9	Melbourne Heart	27	8	3	16	31	40	−9	27	
10	Wellington Phoenix (Note: Wellington Phoenix cannot qualify for the AFC Champions League as they are not recognised as an AFC club.)	27	7	6	14	31	49	−18	27	

Updated to match(es) played on 30 March 2013. Source: ultimatealeague.com
Rules for classification: 1) points; 2) goal difference; 3) number of goals scored.
(C) Champions

=== National Youth League ===
==== Regular season ====
21 October 2012 1	Central Coast Mariners Youth	2–1	Newcastle Jets Youth	Central Coast
10:30	Cirjak 17'; Kwasnik 23'	Report	Oxborrow 47'	Stadium: Central Coast Mariners Centre of Excellence

25 October 2012 2	Newcastle Jets Youth	2–2	Western Sydney Wanderers Youth	Newcastle
18:30	Ilic 44'; Bradbery 82'	Report	Caira 19', 33'	Stadium: Wanderers Oval

4 November 2012 3	Perth Glory Youth	2–3	Newcastle Jets Youth	Perth
15:00	Nagai 30'; Makarounas 90+3'	Report	Bradbery 10' (pen.), 88'; Pavicevic 90'	Stadium: Intiga Stadium

11 November 2012 4	Sydney FC Youth	1–3	Newcastle Jets Youth	Sydney
14:00	Calver 80'	Report	Bridges 3', 47'; Ribeiro 75'	Stadium: Leichhardt Oval

17 November 2012 5	Newcastle Jets Youth	7–0	AIS Football Program	Newcastle
10:30	Hoole 17'; Jesic 20', 23', 33'; Bradbery 25', 50' (pen.), 78'	Report		Stadium: Wanderers Oval

25 November 2012 6	Melbourne Heart Youth	3–0	Newcastle Jets Youth	Melbourne
15:00	Retre 6'; Batsis 22'; Z. Walker 80'	Report		Stadium: John Cain Memorial Park

1 December 2012 7	Melbourne Victory Youth	2–0	Newcastle Jets Youth	Melbourne
15:00	Cernak 38'; Foschini 52'; Markelis (yellow card) 84' (red card) 87'	Report		Stadium: SS Anderson Reserve

8 December 2012 8	Newcastle Jets Youth	4–3	Central Coast Mariners Youth	Newcastle
17:00	Grossman 9'; Hoole 20'; Bradbery 31', 40'	Report	Dixon 35'; M. Neill 51'; Cirjak 86'	Stadium: Hunter Stadium

15 December 2012 9	Adelaide United Youth	3–2	Newcastle Jets Youth	Adelaide
10:30	Mabil 27', 30', 40'	Report	Jesic 10' (pen.); Bradbery 15'	Stadium: Burton Park

23 December 2012 10	Newcastle Jets Youth	4–1	Sydney FC Youth	Newcastle
10:30	Bradbery 16', 84'; Taggart 41', 45+2'	Report	Urosevski 87'	Stadium: Wanderers Oval

6 January 2013 11	Newcastle Jets Youth	1–0	Melbourne Victory Youth	Newcastle
17:00	Ribeiro 18'	Report		Stadium: Wanderers Oval

13 January 2013 12	Newcastle Jets Youth	4–6	Perth Glory Youth	Newcastle
10:30	Ribeiro 13'; Jesic 32', 35', 88' (pen.)	Report	Harold 10' (pen.); Glisby 50' (f.k.); Sam 61'; Woodcock 68'; Zahra 78'; Kalau 80'	Stadium: Wanderers Oval; Referee: Stephan Luca

19 January 2013 13	Brisbane Roar Youth	3–2	Newcastle Jets Youth	Brisbane
10:15	Theodore 19'; Schiavo 39'; Franze 77'	Report	Russell 35'; Jesic 89'	Stadium: Goodwin Park

26 January 2013 14	AIS Football Program	2–5	Newcastle Jets Youth	Canberra
15:00	Marino 37'; Barresi 90+2'	Report	Jesic 2', 73'; Lundy 46', 57', 85'	Stadium: AIS Athletics Track

3 February 2013 15	Newcastle Jets Youth	5–2	Melbourne Heart Youth	Newcastle
17:00	Ribeiro 5'; Taggart 34', 53', 78'; Caravella 44'	Report	Z. Walker 58', 70'	Stadium: Wanderers Oval

10 February 2013 16	Western Sydney Wanderers Youth	0–4	Newcastle Jets Youth	Sydney
17:30		Report	Jesic 3', 13', 80'; Bradbery 48'	Stadium: Cook Park

17 February 2013 17	Newcastle Jets Youth	6–1	Adelaide United Youth	Newcastle
17:00	Lundy 36'; Bradbery 55', 73', 90'; Hoole 64'; Pavicevic 86'	Report	Briscoe 8'	Stadium: Wanderers Oval

23 February 2013 18	Newcastle Jets Youth	1–3	Brisbane Roar Youth	Newcastle
17:00	Bradbery 23'	Report	Meyer 1', 32', 67'	Stadium: Wanderers Oval

==== League table ====
Pos	Team	Pld	W	D	L	GF	GA	GD	Pts
1	Melbourne Victory Youth (C)	18	12	1	5	57	20	+37	37
2	Central Coast Mariners Academy	18	12	1	5	38	28	+10	37
3	Newcastle Jets Youth	18	10	1	7	54	36	+18	31
4	Brisbane Roar Youth	18	9	3	6	39	34	+5	30
5	Perth Glory Youth	18	8	1	9	45	45	0	25
6	Melbourne Heart Youth	18	8	1	9	32	34	−2	25
7	Western Sydney Wanderers Youth	18	7	4	7	29	41	−12	25
8	Adelaide United Youth	18	6	4	8	35	42	−7	22
9	Sydney FC Youth	18	6	3	9	41	46	−5	21
10	AIS Football Program	18	2	1	15	23	58	−35	7

Source: au.soccerway.com
Rules for classification: 1) points; 2) goal difference; 3) number of goals scored.
(C) Champions

==== Results summary ====
Overall								Home						Away					
Pld	W	D	L	GF	GA	GD	Pts	W	D	L	GF	GA	GD	W	D	L	GF	GA	GD
18	10	1	7	54	36	+18	31	6	1	2	34	18	+16	4	0	5	20	18	+2

==== League Goalscorers by round ====
Total	Player		Goals per Game																	
Total	Player		1	2	3	4	5	6	7	8	9	10	11	12	13	14	15	16	17	18
16	(Australia)	Kale Bradbery		1	2		3			2	1	2						1	3	1
13	(Australia)	Marko Jesic					3				1			3	1	2		3		
5	(Australia)	Adam Taggart										2					3			
4	(Brazil)	Bernardo Ribeiro				1							1	1			1			
4	(Australia)	Brandon Lundy														3			1	
3	(Australia)	Andrew Hoole					1			1									1	
2	(England)	Michael Bridges				2														
2	(Australia)	Radovan Pavicevic			1														1	
1	(Australia)	Mitchell Oxborrow	1																	
1	(Australia)	Stevan Ilic		1																
1	(Australia)	Chris Grossman								1										
1	(Australia)	Bobby Russell													1					
1	(Australia)	Zenon Caravella															1			
54	Total		1	2	3	3	7	0	0	4	2	4	1	4	2	5	5	4	6	1

=== NBN State Football League ===
==== Regular season ====
6 April 2013 1	Newcastle Jets Youth	2–2	Valentine Phoenix	Belmont
Saturday AEDT	Cowburn 9'; Satake 39'	Report	Toope 41'; Carusi 52'	Stadium: Cahill Oval

13 April 2013 2	Newcastle Jets Youth	1–2	South Cardiff Gunners	Cardiff South
Saturday 14:30 AEST	Cowburn 57'	Report	Fajkovic 25'; N. Russell 45'	Stadium: Ulinga Oval

24 April 2013 3	Hamilton Olympic Warriors	4–1	Newcastle Jets Youth	Hamilton
Wednesday 18:30 AEST	Koina (?); Hodgson (?); Maguire (?); Brown (?)	Report	Finlayson (?)	Stadium: Darling Street Oval

27 April 2013 4	Weston Workers Bears	3–5	Newcastle Jets Youth	Weston
Saturday 18:15 AEST	Cowburn 26' (o.g.); Subat 28'; McDermott (?)	Report	Cowburn 10'; Bradbery (?)	Stadium: Rockwell Automation Park

4 May 2013 5	Lambton Jaffas	2–2	Newcastle Jets Youth	New Lambton
Saturday 14:30 AEST	Kenny (?); Evans (?)		Satake (?); Pavicevic (?)	Stadium: Edden Oval

12 May 2013 6	Newcastle Jets Youth	2–2	Edgeworth Eagles	Edgeworth
Saturday 14:30 AEST	Satake 45'; Pavicevic (?)	Report	Wood (?); Hill (?)	Stadium: Jack McLaughlan Oval

19 May 2013 7	Broadmeadow Magic	2–0	Newcastle Jets Youth	Broadmeadow
Sunday 14:45 AEST	Berlin 56'; Tippett 72'			Stadium: Wanderers Oval

26 May 2013 8	Newcastle Jets Youth	4–1	Charlestown City Blues	Whitebridge
Sunday 14:30 AEST	Bradbery (?), 44'; Lundy (?)		Smith (?)	Stadium: Lisle Carr Oval

1 June 2013 9	Lake Macquarie City Roosters	2–0	Newcastle Jets Youth	Boolaroo
Saturday 14:30 AEST	Walker (?); Mooney (?)			Stadium: Macquarie Field

8 June 2013 10	Valentine Phoenix	2–7	Newcastle Jets Youth	Belmont
Saturday 16:30 AEST	McGinley (?); Hills (?); Burrell (red card) ?'		Cowburn (?); Bradbery (?), 44' (pen.), 60' (pen.), 90'; Remington (?)	Stadium: Cahill Oval

15 June 2013 11	Newcastle Jets Youth	3–1	Weston Workers Bears	Weston
Saturday 14:30 AEST	B. Russell 49'; Bradbery 61' (pen.), 63'	Report	Ryan (red card) 44'; Morris 83'	Stadium: Rockwell Automation Park

22 June 2013 12	Newcastle Jets Youth	1–3	Lambton Jaffas	New Lambton
Saturday 14:30 AEST	Oxborrow 90'		Majurovski 38'; Wheelhouse 42'; Kenny 82'	Stadium: Edden Oval

30 June 2013 13	South Cardiff Gunners	2–0	Newcastle Jets Youth	Cardiff South
Sunday 14:30 AEST	Fajkovic (?)			Stadium: Ulinga Oval

6 July 2013 14	Newcastle Jets Youth	0–3	Hamilton Olympic Warriors	Hamilton
Saturday 14:30 AEST			Swan (?); Campbell (?); Brown (?)	Stadium: Darling Street Oval

21 July 2013 15	Newcastle Jets Youth	1–2	Lake Macquarie City Roosters	Boolaroo
Sunday 14:30 AEST	Sansucie 72'		Walker 15'; Mooney 88'	Stadium: Macquarie Field

27 July 2013 16	Edgeworth Eagles	3–1	Newcastle Jets Youth	Edgeworth
Saturday 14:30 AEST	Taylor (?); Palozzi 44' (pen.); Wood (?)		Bradbery 10' (pen.)	Stadium: Jack McLaughlan Oval

3 August 2013 17	Newcastle Jets Youth	0–2	Broadmeadow Magic	Broadmeadow
Saturday 18:00 AEST			Parker (?); Berlin (?)	Stadium: Wanderers Oval

10 August 2013 18	Charlestown City Blues	2–1	Newcastle Jets Youth	Whitebridge
Sunday 14:30 AEST	Bird (?); Goodchild (?)		Bradbery (?)	Stadium: Lisle Carr Oval

==== League table ====
Pos	Team	Pld	W	D	L	GF	GA	GD	Pts	Qualification or relegation
1	Broadmeadow Magic	18	11	3	4	44	29	+15	36	First place qualifies directly to second week of Finals; Second and Third places qualify for Qualifying Final; Fourth and Fifth places qualify for Elimination Final
2	Lambton Jaffas	18	9	5	4	38	23	+15	32	First place qualifies directly to second week of Finals; Second and Third places qualify for Qualifying Final; Fourth and Fifth places qualify for Elimination Final
3	Hamilton Olympic	18	9	3	6	40	23	+17	30	First place qualifies directly to second week of Finals; Second and Third places qualify for Qualifying Final; Fourth and Fifth places qualify for Elimination Final
4	Edgeworth Eagles	18	8	5	5	38	30	+8	29	First place qualifies directly to second week of Finals; Second and Third places qualify for Qualifying Final; Fourth and Fifth places qualify for Elimination Final
5	Weston Workers	18	7	6	5	28	35	−7	27	First place qualifies directly to second week of Finals; Second and Third places qualify for Qualifying Final; Fourth and Fifth places qualify for Elimination Final
6	Charlestown City Blues	18	7	5	6	51	50	+1	26	
7	South Cardiff	18	7	5	6	27	27	0	26	
8	Lake Macquarie City	18	5	4	9	30	34	−4	19	
9	Newcastle Jets Youth	18	4	3	11	31	40	−9	15	
10	Valentine Phoenix	18	2	3	13	18	54	−36	9	

Updated to match(es) played on unknown. Source: Fox Sports Pulse
Rules for classification: 1) points; 2) goal difference; 3) number of goals scored.

==== League Goalscorers by round ====
Total	Player		Goals per Game																	
Total	Player		1	2	3	4	5	6	7	8	9	10	11	12	13	14	15	16	17	18
15	(Australia)	Kale Bradbery				4				2		5	2					1		1
4	(Australia)	Nick Cowburn	1	1		1						1								
3	(Australia)	Koh Satake	1				1	1												
2	(Australia)	Radovan Pavicevic					1	1												
2	(Australia)	Brandon Lundy								2										
1	(Australia)	Michael Finlayson			1															
1	(Australia)	Luke Remington										1								
1	(Australia)	Bobby Russell											1							
1	(Australia)	Mitchell Oxborrow												1						
1	(Australia)	Josh Sansucie															1			
31	Total		2	1	1	5	2	2	0	4	0	7	3	1	0	0	1	1	0	1

=== W-League ===
==== Regular season ====
21 October 2012 1	Sydney FC	3–3	Newcastle Jets	Sydney
15:00	Kennedy 35'; Kerr 75', 77'	Report	van Egmond 17'; Andrews 21'; Huster 58'	Stadium: Leichhardt Oval; Referee: Casey Reibelt

27 October 2012 2	Newcastle Jets	0–5	Canberra United	Newcastle
14:00		Report	Raso 74'; Heyman 84'; Hingst 86'; Munoz 87'; A. Sykes 90+5'	Stadium: Wanderers Oval; Referee: Kirralee Gardner

3 November 2012 3	Melbourne Victory	1–0	Newcastle Jets	Geelong
14:00	Stott 45'	Report		Stadium: Simonds Stadium; Referee: Katie Patterson

10 November 2012 4	Newcastle Jets	1–6	Perth Glory	Newcastle
16:30	Huster 73'	Report	De Vanna 4'; McCallum 19'; Gill 58', 62', 90+2' (pen.); Tabain 68'	Stadium: Wanderers Oval; Referee: Peta McCallum

17 November 2012 5	Newcastle Jets	4–0	Adelaide United	Newcastle
16:30	Andrews 8'; Salem 39' (pen.); Hensman 51'; Huster 66'	Report		Stadium: Wanderers Oval

25 November 2012 6	Western Sydney Wanderers	3–0	Newcastle Jets	Sydney
14:00	Walsh 23', 53'; Sciberras 90+3'	Report		Stadium: Campbelltown Stadium; Referee: Kate Jacewicz

2 December 2012 7	Newcastle Jets	2–3	Brisbane Roar	Newcastle
14:00	Huster 16'; G. Simon 69'	Report	Chapman 54'; Gielnik 62'; Polkinghorne 80'	Stadium: Wanderers Oval; Referee: Katie Patterson

8 December 2012 8	Canberra United	1–0	Newcastle Jets	Canberra
16:00	N. Sykes 34'	Report		Stadium: Deakin Football Stadium; Referee: Rebecca Durcau

15 December 2012 9	Adelaide United	2–0	Newcastle Jets	Adelaide
16:00	K. Moore 67'; Wallace 70'	Report		Stadium: Burton Park; Referee: Katie Patterson

23 December 2012 10	Newcastle Jets	0–4	Sydney FC	Newcastle
16:30		Report	K. Simon 11', 47', 87'; Kennedy 14'	Stadium: Wanderers Oval; Referee: Kelly Jones

5 January 2013 11	Perth Glory	2–2	Newcastle Jets	Perth
16:00	R. Sutton 22'; Gill 56'	Report	van Egmond 3'; Courtenay 77'	Stadium: Intiga Stadium; Attendance: 736; Referee: Catherine Hoffman

13 January 2013 12	Newcastle Jets	3–3	Melbourne Victory	Newcastle
16:30	Courtenay 40' van Egmond 42', 84' (pen.)	Report	Jackson 3'; Barilla 30'; Crawford 60' (o.g.)	Stadium: Wanderers Oval; Referee: Lara Smith

==== Results summary ====
Overall								Home						Away					
Pld	W	D	L	GF	GA	GD	Pts	W	D	L	GF	GA	GD	W	D	L	GF	GA	GD
12	1	3	8	15	33	−18	6	1	1	4	10	21	−11	0	2	4	5	12	−7

==== League table ====
Pos	Team	Pld	W	D	L	GF	GA	GD	Pts	Qualification
1	Brisbane Roar	12	8	2	2	28	15	+13	26	Qualification to Finals series
2	Perth Glory	12	7	3	2	34	20	+14	24	Qualification to Finals series
3	Melbourne Victory	12	7	2	3	26	14	+12	23	Qualification to Finals series
4	Sydney FC (C)	12	6	2	4	30	24	+6	20	Qualification to Finals series
5	Canberra United	12	5	3	4	25	20	+5	18	
6	Western Sydney Wanderers	12	4	1	7	19	23	−4	13	
7	Newcastle Jets	12	1	3	8	15	33	−18	6	
8	Adelaide United	12	2	0	10	12	40	−28	6	

Source: au.soccerway.com
Rules for classification: 1) points; 2) goal difference; 3) number of goals scored.
(C) Champions

==== League Goalscorers by round ====
Total	Player		Goals per Game											
Total	Player		1	2	3	4	5	6	7	8	9	10	11	12
4	(United States)	Tori Huster	1			1	1		1					
4	(Australia)	Emily van Egmond	1										1	2
2	(Australia)	Tara Andrews	1				1							
2	(Australia)	Jasmin Courtenay											1	1
1	(United States)	Angela Salem					1							
1	(Australia)	Kate Hensman					1							
1	(Australia)	Gema Simon							1					

== Squad statistics ==
=== Appearances and goals ===
No.	Pos	Nat	Player	Total		A League	
No.	Pos	Nat	Player	Apps	Goals	Apps	Goals
1	GK	(Australia) AUS	Ben Kennedy	2	0	1+1	0
2	DF	(Australia) AUS	Scott Neville	17	0	16+1	0
3	MF	(Australia) AUS	Zenon Caravella	7	0	6+1	0
4	DF	(Australia) AUS	Josh Mitchell	14	1	14+0	1
5	DF	(Switzerland) SUI	Dominik Ritter	19	0	19+0	0
6	MF	(Australia) AUS	Ben Kantarovski	5	0	3+2	0
7	MF	(Australia) AUS	James Brown	15	0	12+3	0
8	MF	(Australia) AUS	Ruben Zadkovich	26	3	26+0	3
9	FW	(England) ENG	Emile Heskey	22	8	22+0	8
10	MF	(Brazil) BRA	Bernardo Ribeiro	6	0	3+3	0
11	DF	(Australia) AUS	Connor Chapman	16	0	14+2	0
12	MF	(Australia) AUS	Joshua Brillante	21	0	16+5	0
13	DF	(Australia) AUS	Sam Gallaway	10	0	10+0	0
14	DF	(Australia) AUS	Taylor Regan	8	0	8+0	0
15	DF	(Australia) AUS	Craig Goodwin	23	3	20+3	3
16	MF	(Australia) AUS	Jobe Wheelhouse	11	0	9+2	0
17	FW	(Australia) AUS	James Virgili	22	0	11+11	0
18	MF	(Australia) AUS	Jacob Pepper	8	0	1+7	0
19	FW	(England) ENG	Michael Bridges	14	2	6+8	2
20	GK	(Australia) AUS	Mark Birighitti	21	0	21+0	0
21	FW	(Australia) AUS	Marko Jesic	5	0	4+1	0
22	FW	(Australia) AUS	Adam Taggart	17	2	9+8	2
24	MF	(Australia) AUS	Mitchell Oxborrow	1	0	1+0	0
25	MF	(Australia) AUS	Mitch Cooper	4	0	1+3	0
26	MF	(Australia) AUS	Andrew Hoole	7	0	3+4	0
Players who appeared for Newcastle Jets no longer at the club:
3	DF	(Brazil) BRA	Tiago	7	1	7+0	1
23	FW	(Australia) AUS	Ryan Griffiths	20	9	20+0	9
33	GK	(Australia) AUS	Matthew Nash	5	0	4+1	0

=== Goal scorers ===
Rank	Player		Goals per Game																															
Rank	Player		1	2	3	4	5	6	7	8	9	10	11	12	13	14	15	16	17	18	19	20	21	22	23	24	25	26	27	FS-SF1	FS-SF2	FS-PF	Grand Final	Total
1	(Australia)	Ryan Griffiths		1	1			1		1						1		1			2		1											9
1	(England)	Emile Heskey		1	1	2		1						1	1					1			1											9
3	(Australia)	Craig Goodwin		1						1				1																				3
3	(Australia)	Ruben Zadkovich					1								1							1												3
5	(Australia)	Adam Taggart																							1		1							2
5	(England)	Michael Bridges																							1			1						2
7	(Brazil)	Tiago					1																											1
7	(Australia)	Josh Mitchell					1																											1

A goal was scored from a penalty kick
2 were scored from penalty kicks

=== Disciplinary record ===
No.	Position	Name	Yellow card	Yellow card Yellow card Red card	Red card
2	DF	(Australia) Scott Neville	2	0	0
3	DF	(Brazil) Tiago	4	0	0
3	MF	(Australia) Zenon Caravella	3	0	0
4	DF	(Australia) Josh Mitchell	7	1	0
5	DF	(Switzerland) Dominik Ritter	5	0	0
6	MF	(Australia) Ben Kantarovski	1	0	0
7	MF	(Australia) James Brown	3	0	0
8	MF	(Australia) Ruben Zadkovich	6	0	0
9	FW	(England) Emile Heskey	5	0	0
11	DF	(Australia) Connor Chapman	2	0	0
13	DF	(Australia) Sam Gallaway	4	0	0
14	DF	(Australia) Taylor Regan	3	1	0
15	DF	(Australia) Craig Goodwin	4	0	0
17	FW	(Australia) James Virgili	4	0	0
18	MF	(Australia) Jacob Pepper	2	1	0
19	FW	(England) Michael Bridges	2	0	0
20	GK	(Australia) Mark Birighitti	2	0	1
21	FW	(Australia) Marko Jesic	1	0	0
23	FW	(Australia) Ryan Griffiths	6	0	0
24	MF	(Australia) Mitchell Oxborrow	1	0	0
26	MF	(Australia) Andrew Hoole	1	0	0
