= 2010–11 Newcastle Jets FC season =

Newcastle United Jets FC
2010–11 season
- Chairman: Ken Edwards
- Manager: Branko Culina (A-League)
- A-League: 7th
- Final: DNQ

The Newcastle Jets 2010–11 season was the Newcastle Jets' sixth season since the inception of the Australian A-League and the tenth since the club's founding, in 2000.

It was announced on 22 July 2010 that Michael Bridges would be the Newcastle Jets senior team captain, With Ljubo Miličević to be his deputy.

Prior to Newcastle's round 4 games against Brisbane Roar, it was revealed that the club was under significant financial stress. This meant that the club was unable to pay staff and player wages on time. This resulted in the club seeking either a loan or an advance on their quarterly share of the television deal. It was announced by the club and the Football Federation Australia that the governing body would give a short term assistance package, making sure the club made it through their next few games and back into financial viability.

After giving Con Constantine every chance to show that he was able to prove financial viability, it was determined by the FFA that the best course of action would be to sell the club to mining magnate and horse owner Nathan Tinkler. In the first few weeks under his ownership Tinkler stated that he wished to give the club back to the community, and he made several key changes to the way the club was run. These changes included appointing an executive chairman in Ken Edwards to run the club while a board of directors and football advisory board were put in place. Tinkler also extended his ownership of the Jets to last until at least 2020. This enabled the club to move forward with a new direction which included resigning manager Branko Culina on a four-year contract, and doubling the footballing departments budget from $1.1million to around $2.5million, creating 8 new full-time positions at the club and 15 jobs in total.

As part of a new initiative called "Be a part of it", the Jets will host a community day, where 10,000 fans will be admitted free for the game against Melbourne Heart on 31 October 2010. A new price structure for tickets includes a free season pass for children younger than 15, a family pass for 11 home games with reserved grandstand for $100 and general admission for $10. The club has a new sponsor with Hunter Medical Research Institute. The Jets will have the institute's logo on the front of their jersey and will donate $5000 for every goal they score at home and $2500 for an away goal. The changes continued when the club set up a new administration office, extended the contract of coach Branko Culina until March 2015 and unveiled a $2.5 million blueprint for the football department.

The Newcastle Jets announced with the FFA and the State Government, that they would host the Los Angeles Galaxy at Energy Australia Stadium on 27 November. The match, generally speculated to be an almost certain sellout, is set to play host to big-name players David Beckham and Landon Donovan.

== 2010–11 season squads ==
=== Senior squad ===
Note: Flags indicate national team as defined under FIFA eligibility rules; some limited exceptions apply. Players may hold more than one non-FIFA nationality.

No.	Pos.	Nation	Player
1	GK	AUS	Ben Kennedy
2	DF	AUS	Taylor Regan
3	DF	AUS	Adam D'Apuzzo
4	DF	AUS	Nikolai Topor-Stanley
5	DF	AUS	Ljubo Miličević (Vice-Captain)
6	MF	AUS	Ben Kantarovski (Youth)
7	MF	AUS	Kasey Wehrman (Vice-Captain)
8	FW	ENG	Michael Bridges (Captain)
9	FW	CHN	Zhang Shuo
10	MF	AUS	Ruben Zadkovich
11	DF	AUS	Tarek Elrich
12	MF	AUS	Jobe Wheelhouse
13	FW	AUS	Sasho Petrovski
14	FW	AUS	Labinot Haliti
15	FW	AUS	Sean Rooney (Youth)
16	FW	NZL	Jeremy Brockie

No.	Pos.	Nation	Player
17	MF	ITA	Marcello Fiorentini
18	FW	AUS	Marko Jesic (Youth)
19	MF	IRQ	Ali Abbas Al-Hilfi
20	GK	AUS	Neil Young
21	MF	AUS	Brodie Mooy (Youth)
22	MF	AUS	Kaz Patafta
23	FW	AUS	Ryan Griffiths
24	FW	ENG	Francis Jeffers (Guest Player)
25	DF	AUS	Sam Gallaway (Youth)
26	FW	AUS	James Virgili (Youth)
27	FW	SLO	Tomislav Misura (Injury Replacement)
28	DF	AUS	Mario Šimić (Youth)
30	GK	AUS	Paul Henderson (Injury Replacement)
31	DF	AUS	Jacob Pepper (Youth)
40	GK	AUS	Matthew Nash (Injury Replacement)

=== Beginning of season transfers ===
In:

- (Australia) Kasey Wehrman – Fredrikstad FK
- (Australia) Ruben Zadkovich – Derby County
- (New Zealand) Jeremy Brockie – North Queensland Fury FC
- (Australia) Taylor Regan – Youth League
- (Italy) Marcello Fiorentini – A.C. Palazzolo 1913
- (China) Zhang Shuo – Persik Kediri
- (Australia) Paul Henderson – Sydney Olympic

Out:

- (Australia) Matt Thompson – Melbourne Heart FC
- (Australia) Jason Naidovski – Contract Expired
- (Australia) Shaun Ontong – Contract Expired
- (Australia) Angelo Costanzo – Retired
- (Australia) Jason Hoffman – Melbourne Heart FC
- (South Korea) Song Jin-Hyung – Tours FC
- (Italy) Fabio Vignaroli – Released Due To Injury
- (Netherlands) Donny de Groot – Go Ahead Eagles

Re-signed:

- (Australia) Ljubo Miličević – 1 Year
- (Australia) Ben Kennedy – 2 Years
- (England) Michael Bridges – 2 Years
- (Australia) Marko Jesic – 1 Year
- (Australia) Neil Young – 1 Year
- (Australia) Labinot Haliti – 2 Years
- (Australia) Tarek Elrich – 2 Years
- (Australia) Adam D'Apuzzo – 1 Year
- (Iraq) Ali Abbas Al-Hilfi – 1 Year

Unsuccessful trialists:

- (South Africa) Sibusiso Zuma
- (Panama) Chaimir Toloy
- (Australia) Griffin McMaster
- (Australia) Chris Price
- (Australia) David D'Apuzzo
- (New Zealand) Aaron Clapham

=== Youth squad ===
Note: Flags indicate national team as defined under FIFA eligibility rules; some limited exceptions apply. Players may hold more than one non-FIFA nationality.

No.	Pos.	Nation	Player
1	GK	AUS	Robbie Kolak
2	DF	AUS	Sam Gallaway
3	DF	AUS	Mario Šimić
4	DF	AUS	Jon Griffiths
5	DF	AUS	Nathan Millgate
6	DF	AUS	Jacob Pepper
7	MF	AUS	Scott Pettit
8	FW	AUS	Steven Veleski
9	FW	AUS	Gavin Forbes
10	MF	TLS	Jesse Pinto (Captain)

No.	Pos.	Nation	Player
11	FW	AUS	James Virgili
12	MF	AUS	David Talevski
13	FW	AUS	Fabian Iacovelli
14	MF	AUS	Kyle Ewart
15	MF	AUS	Abe Wheelhouse
16	MF	AUS	Luke Remington
17	MF	AUS	Michael Finlayson
18	FW	AUS	Blake Green
20	GK	AUS	Jack Duncan
—			+ up to four over-age players

=== Women's squad ===
Note: Flags indicate national team as defined under FIFA eligibility rules; some limited exceptions apply. Players may hold more than one non-FIFA nationality.

No.	Pos.	Nation	Player
1	GK	AUS	Alison Logue
2	DF	AUS	Libby Sharpe
3	DF	USA	Nicole Cross
4	DF	AUS	Thea Slatyer
5	DF	AUS	Alex Hyung
6	MF	AUS	Amber Neilson
7	MF	AUS	Gema Simon
8	MF	AUS	Bronte Bates
9	FW	AUS	Kate Hensman
10	MF	AUS	Hayley Crawford
11	FW	AUS	Sasha McDonnell

No.	Pos.	Nation	Player
12	MF	AUS	Melissa Feuregill
13	DF	AUS	Carlie Ikonomou
14	DF	AUS	Hannah Brewer
15	MF	AUS	Nicole Jones
16	DF	AUS	Kirstyn Pearce
17	MF	AUS	Madeline Searl
18	FW	AUS	Leia Smith
19	FW	AUS	Tara Andrews
20	MF	AUS	Kara Mowbray
21	MF	AUS	Renee Cartwright
22	GK	USA	Allison Lipsher

== Pre-season fixtures ==
8 July 2010
19:30 UTC+10

Melbourne Heart	1–2	Newcastle Jets
Sibon 68'		Bridges 6'; Abbas 27'

La Trobe City Stadium
Attendance: 3000
18 July 2010
16:00 UTC+10

Sydney United	0–2	Newcastle Jets
		Abbas 14'; Brockie 38'

Sydney United Sports Centre
Attendance: 3000
25 July 2010
14:00 UTC+10

Newcastle Jets	0–1	Brisbane Roar
		Franjic 85'

Port Macquarie Regional Stadium
Attendance: 2000 approx.
Referee: Stuart Wolfe
28 July 2010
20:00 UTC+10

Rockdale City Suns	0–4	Newcastle Jets
		Abbas 12'; Rooney 24'; Topor-Stanley 32'; Jesic 59'

Bicentennial Park

The Newcastle Jets will play two trial games for players currently playing in the NBN State Football League. These games will give players from the Under-20, and First Grade teams from within the competition to have the opportunity to earn an A-league contract, and give the Newcastle Jets the chance to observe the best of the local youth talent.

14 July 2010
18:00 UTC+10

NBN State Youth League XI	2–0	Newcastle Jets Youth

Darling Street Oval, Hamilton
14 July 2010
20:00 UTC+10

NBN State League XI	1–3	Newcastle Jets
Joel Wood 88'		Petrovski 23'; Brockie 35'; Jesic 75'

Darling Street Oval, Hamilton
Attendance: 2000

== Mid-season fixtures ==
After the ownership change, the new structure wanted to show an exhibition match. After a few days of hard work and collaboration between the Newcastle Jets, the FFA and the New South Wales Government, it was announced at a press conference at Newcastle University that the Newcastle Jets would host David Beckham's LA Galaxy.

27 November 2010
19:30 UTC+10

Newcastle Jets	2–1	Los Angeles Galaxy
Sasho Petrovski 39'; Labinot Haliti 52'		Landon Donovan 7'

Energy Australia Stadium
Attendance: 23317
Referee: Matthew Brezze

== 2010–11 Hyundai A-League fixtures ==
6 August 2010	Adelaide United	0 : 0	Newcastle Jets	Hindmarsh Stadium, Adelaide
Friday 19:30 CST		Report; Summary		Attendance: 8,479; Referee: (Australia) Gerard Parsons

13 August 2010	Newcastle Jets	1 : 1	Melbourne Heart	EnergyAustralia Stadium, Newcastle
Friday 20:00 EST	Brockie 60'	Report; Summary	Kantarovski 79' (o.g.)	Attendance: 8,735; Referee: (Australia) Ryan Shepheard

21 August 2010	Perth Glory	1 : 0	Newcastle Jets	nib Stadium, Perth
Friday 15:15 WST	Jelić 45+1'	Report; Summary		Attendance: 12,031; Referee: (Australia) Matthew Breeze

5 September 2010	Newcastle Jets	0 : 0	Brisbane Roar	EnergyAustralia Stadium, Newcastle
Sunday 15:00 EST	Zadkovich (yellow card) 30' (yellow-red card) 82'	Report; Summary		Attendance: 7,066; Referee: (Australia) Kris Griffiths-Jones

11 September 2010	Adelaide United	2 : 1	Newcastle Jets	Hindmarsh Stadium, Adelaide
Saturday 19:00 CST	Leckie 22'; Flores 65'	Report; Summary	Rooney 89'	Attendance: 9,571; Referee: (Australia) Ben Williams

17 September 2010	Newcastle Jets	2 : 0	Perth Glory	EnergyAustralia Stadium, Newcastle
Friday 20:00 EST	Bridges 10'; Haliti 89'	Report; Summary		Attendance: 6,977; Referee: (Australia) Ryan Shepheard

22 September 2010	Gold Coast United	1 : 0	Newcastle Jets	Skilled Park, Gold Coast
Wednesday 19:30 EST	Curtis 89'	Report; Summary		Attendance: 2,091; Referee: (Australia) Peter Green

25 September 2010	Newcastle Jets	0 : 0	Melbourne Victory	EnergyAustralia Stadium, Newcastle
Saturday 19:30 EST		Report; Summary		Attendance: 8,652; Referee: (Australia) Chris Beath

16 October 2010	Brisbane Roar	1 : 1	Newcastle Jets	Suncorp Stadium, Brisbane
Saturday 19:45 EST	Reinaldo 77'	Report; Summary	M. Smith 18' (o.g.)	Attendance: 10,191; Referee: (Australia) Jarred Gillett

31 October 2010	Newcastle Jets	0 : 2	Melbourne Heart	Port Macquarie Regional Stadium, Port Macquarie
Sunday 15:00 EDT		Report; Summary	Kalmar 53'; Sibon 90+4' (pen.)	Attendance: 3,114; Referee: (Australia) Kris Griffiths-Jones

7 November 2010	Sydney FC	1 : 0	Newcastle Jets	Sydney Football Stadium, Sydney
Sunday 17:00 EDT	Cazarine 76'	Report; Summary		Attendance: 8,512; Referee: (Australia) Chris Beath

13 November 2010	Newcastle Jets	3 : 1	Adelaide United	EnergyAustralia Stadium, Newcastle
Saturday 19:45 EDT	Topor-Stanley 4'; Jesic 13', 52'	Report; Summary	Fyfe 79'	Attendance: 8,278; Referee: (Australia) Kurt Ams

17 November 2010	Newcastle Jets	1 : 1	Brisbane Roar	EnergyAustralia Stadium, Newcastle
Wednesday 19:30 EDT	Kantarovski 54'	Report; Summary	Solórzano 80'	Attendance: 7,829; Referee: (Australia) Peter Green

20 November 2010	Newcastle Jets	1 : 0	Wellington Phoenix	EnergyAustralia Stadium, Newcastle
Saturday 19:00 EDT	Jesic 55'	Report; Summary		Attendance: 12,147; Referee: (Australia) Gerard Parsons

24 November 2010	Newcastle Jets	1 : 1	Central Coast Mariners	EnergyAustralia Stadium, Newcastle
Wednesday 19:00 EDT	Petrovski 90+2'	Report; Summary	Simon 49'	Attendance: 7,730; Referee: (Australia) Matthew Breeze

4 December 2010	North Queensland Fury	0 : 2	Newcastle Jets	Dairy Farmers Stadium, Townsville
Saturday 20:15 EST		Report; Summary	Topor-Stanley 79'; Petrovski 90+3'	Attendance: 3,573; Referee: (Australia) Kurt Ams

8 December 2010	Melbourne Heart	0 : 2	Newcastle Jets	AAMI Park, Melbourne
Wednesday 19:00 EDT		Report; Summary	Wheelhouse (red card) 7'; Jeffers 12'; Jesic 18'	Attendance: 2,754; Referee: (Australia) Alan Milliner

15 December 2010	Newcastle Jets	2 : 0	Gold Coast United	EnergyAustralia Stadium, Newcastle
Wednesday 19:00 EDT	Abbas 77'; Miličević (yellow card) 51' (yellow-red card) 78'; Petrovski 82'	Report; Summary		Attendance: 8,046; Referee: (Australia) Ryan Shepheard

18 December 2010	Wellington Phoenix	4 : 0	Newcastle Jets	Westpac Stadium, Wellington
Saturday 19:00 NZDT	T. Brown 18'; Rojas 31'; Greenacre 41'; Macallister 88'	Report; Summary		Attendance: 6,053; Referee: (Australia) Jarred Gillett

27 December 2010	Melbourne Victory	2 : 1	Newcastle Jets	AAMI Park, Melbourne
Monday 18:00 EDT	Hernández 20'; Ricardinho 90'	Report; Summary	Zadkovich 54'	Attendance: 16,378; Referee: (Australia) Matthew Breeze

3 January 2011	Newcastle Jets	1 : 2	Sydney FC	EnergyAustralia Stadium, Newcastle
Monday 17:00 EDT	Haliti 66'	Report; Summary	Moriyasu 36'; Cazarine 45+1'	Attendance: 12,118; Referee: (Australia) Matthew Gillett

8 January 2011	North Queensland Fury	1 : 3	Newcastle Jets	Dairy Farmers Stadium, Townsville
Saturday 20:15 EST	M. Hughes 90+5' (pen.)	Report; Summary	Zadkovich 13'; Haliti 16'; Ryan Griffiths 70'	Attendance: 4,315; Referee: (Australia) Ryan Shepheard

11 January 2011	Newcastle Jets	1 : 0	North Queensland Fury	EnergyAustralia Stadium, Newcastle
Tuesday 7:30 EDT	Jesic 13'	Report; Summary		Attendance: 8,218; Referee: (Australia) Gerard Parsons

16 January 2011	Newcastle Jets	0 : 2	Central Coast Mariners	EnergyAustralia Stadium, Newcastle
Sunday 17:00 EDT		Report; Summary	Simon 14'; Hutchinson 87'	Attendance: 13,463; Referee: (Australia) Chris Beath

22 January 2011	Gold Coast United	5 : 1	Newcastle Jets	Skilled Park, Gold Coast
Saturday 20:15 EST	Traoré 9'; Djite 36', 79', 87'; Smeltz 61'	Report; Summary	Zhang 75'	Attendance: 14,783; Referee: (Australia) Matthew Breeze

30 January 2011	Wellington Phoenix	1 : 0	Newcastle Jets	Westpac Stadium, Wellington
Sunday 17:00 NZDT	Macallister 20'	Report; Summary	Ryan Griffiths (red card) 66'	Attendance: 10,917; Referee: (Australia) Chris Beath

2 February 2011	Melbourne Victory	2 : 0	Newcastle Jets	Etihad Stadium, Melbourne
Wednesday 19:00 EDT	Pondeljak 57'; Kruse 69'	Report; Summary	Fiorentini (red card) 61'	Attendance: 11,296; Referee: (Australia) Strebre Delovski

6 February 2011	Newcastle Jets	1 : 1	Sydney FC	EnergyAustralia Stadium, Newcastle
Sunday 17:00 EDT	Petrovski 84'	Report; Summary	Cazarine 77'	Attendance: 6,780; Referee: (Australia) Peter Green

10 February 2011	Newcastle Jets	4 : 0	Perth Glory	EnergyAustralia Stadium, Newcastle
Thursday 19:30 EDT	Haliti 13'; Brockie 55'; Petrovski 68' (pen.), 69'	Report; Summary		Attendance: 7,286; Referee: (Australia) Matthew Breeze

13 February 2011	Central Coast Mariners	1 : 0	Newcastle Jets	Bluetongue Stadium, Gosford
Sunday 17:00 EDT	Pérez 90'	Report; Summary		Attendance: 9,975; Referee: (Australia) Chris Beath

Pos	Team	Pld	W	D	L	GF	GA	GD	Pts	Qualification
1	Brisbane Roar (C)	30	18	11	1	58	26	+32	65	Qualification for 2012 AFC Champions League group stage and Finals series (Note: First place qualifies for the 2012 AFC Champions League group stage. Winning the 2011 A-League Grand Final automatically earns qualification for the 2012 AFC Champions League group stage, unless first place are champions. Second place qualifies for the 2012 AFC Champions League qualifying play-off, unless they qualify for the 2011 A-League Grand Final alongside first place or become A-League Champions, subsequently third place then qualify for the 2012 AFC Champions League qualifying play-off.)
2	Central Coast Mariners	30	16	9	5	50	31	+19	57	Qualification for 2012 AFC Champions League group stage and Finals series
3	Adelaide United	30	15	5	10	51	36	+15	50	Qualification for 2012 AFC Champions League qualifying play-off and Finals series
4	Gold Coast United	30	12	10	8	40	32	+8	46	Qualification for Finals series
5	Melbourne Victory	30	11	10	9	45	39	+6	43	Qualification for Finals series
6	Wellington Phoenix	30	12	5	13	39	41	−2	41	Qualification for Finals series
7	Newcastle Jets	30	9	8	13	29	33	−4	35	
8	Melbourne Heart	30	8	11	11	32	42	−10	35	
9	Sydney FC	30	8	10	12	35	40	−5	34	
10	Perth Glory	30	5	8	17	27	54	−27	23	
11	North Queensland Fury	30	4	7	19	28	60	−32	19	

Source: ultimatealeague.com
Rules for classification: 1) points; 2) goal difference; 3) number of goals scored.
(C) Champions

== Season statistics ==
=== Goal scorers ===
Last updated 18 August 2010

Name	Pre-Season	A-League	Finals	Total
(Australia) Sasho Petrovski	1	5	0	6
(Australia) Marko Jesic	2	4	0	6
(Australia) Labinot Haliti	0	4	0	4
(New Zealand) Jeremy Brockie	2	2	0	4
(Iraq) Ali Abbas Al-Hilfi	3	1	0	4
(England) Ruben Zadkovich	0	2	0	2
(Australia) Nikolai Topor-Stanley	1	2	0	3
(England) Michael Bridges	2	1	0	3
(Australia) Sean Rooney	1	1	0	2
(Australia) Ryan Griffiths	0	1	0	1

=== Discipline ===
Name	Cautions (yellow card)	2nd Caution – Send-Off (yellow card) (yellow card) (red card)	Send-Offs (red card)
(Australia) Ruben Zadkovich	3	1	0
(Australia) Kasey Wehrman	2	0	0
(Iraq) Ali Abbas	1	0	0
(England) Michael Bridges	1	0	0
(Australia) Ben Kantarovski	1	0	0
(Australia) Tarek Elrich	1	0	0
(Australia) Taylor Regan	1	0	0
(China) Zhang Shuo	1	0	0

=== Home attendance ===
Round	Opponent	Attendance
Round 1	Melbourne Heart	8735
Round 4	Brisbane Roar	7066
Round 6	Perth Glory	6977
Round 8	Melbourne Victory	8652
Round 10	North Queensland Fury	
Round 11	Melbourne Heart	3114
Round 13	Adelaide United	8278
Round 14	Brisbane Roar	7829
Round 15	Wellington Phoenix	12147
	Total Attendance	50651
	Average Attendance	7850
