= 2011–12 Newcastle Jets FC season =

Newcastle Jets FC
2011–12 season
- Chairman: Ray Baartz
- Manager: Gary van Egmond
- A-League: 7th
- Top goalscorer: Jeremy Brockie and Ryan Griffiths (9 goals)
- Highest home attendance: 17,245
- Lowest home attendance: 9,311
Home colours	Away colours

The 2011–12 season was the Newcastle Jets' seventh season since the inception of the Australian A-League and the eleventh since the club's founding in 2000.

== 2011-12 squad ==
=== Senior squad ===
Note: Flags indicate national team as defined under FIFA eligibility rules; some limited exceptions apply. Players may hold more than one non-FIFA nationality.

No.	Pos.	Nation	Player
1	GK	AUS	Ben Kennedy
2	DF	AUS	Taylor Regan
3	DF	AUS	Mario Šimić
4	DF	AUS	Nikolai Topor-Stanley
5	DF	BRA	Tiago
6	MF	AUS	Ben Kantarovski
7	MF	AUS	Kasey Wehrman (Vice-Captain)
8	FW	NZL	Jeremy Brockie
9	MF	ENG	Michael Bridges
10	MF	AUS	Ruben Zadkovich
11	DF	AUS	Tarek Elrich
12	MF	AUS	Jobe Wheelhouse (Captain)

No.	Pos.	Nation	Player
13	DF	KOR	Byun Sung-Hwan
14	FW	AUS	Labinot Haliti
15	FW	AUS	Chris Payne
16	DF	AUS	Sam Gallaway
17	MF	AUS	James Virgili
18	FW	AUS	Marko Jesic
19	GK	AUS	Matthew Nash
20	MF	AUS	Jason Čulina
22	MF	IRQ	Ali Abbas Al-Hilfi
23	FW	AUS	Ryan Griffiths
24	FW	ENG	Francis Jeffers

=== Transfers ===
In

Note: Flags indicate national team as defined under FIFA eligibility rules; some limited exceptions apply. Players may hold more than one non-FIFA nationality.

No.	Pos.	Nation	Player
3	DF	AUS	Mario Šimić (promoted from Youth Team)
5	DF	BRA	Tiago (from (Germany) Fortuna Düsseldorf)
13	DF	KOR	Byun Sung-Hwan (from Sydney FC)
15	FW	AUS	Chris Payne (from North Queensland Fury)
16	DF	AUS	Sam Gallaway (promoted from Youth Team)

No.	Pos.	Nation	Player
17	MF	AUS	James Virgili (promoted from Youth Team)
20	MF	AUS	Jason Culina (from Gold Coast United)
24	FW	ENG	Francis Jeffers ( (Scotland) Motherwell)
25	MF	ENG	Michael Bridges (from Retired)

Out

Note: Flags indicate national team as defined under FIFA eligibility rules; some limited exceptions apply. Players may hold more than one non-FIFA nationality.

No.	Pos.	Nation	Player
3	MF	AUS	Adam D'Apuzzo (to Marconi Stallions FC)
8	MF	ENG	Michael Bridges (to Retired)
9	FW	CHN	Zhang Shuo (to (China) Shenzhen Phoenix)
13	FW	AUS	Sasho Petrovski (to South Coast Wolves)
15	FW	AUS	Sean Rooney (to Free Agent)

No.	Pos.	Nation	Player
17	MF	ITA	Marcello Fiorentini (to Free Agent)
20	GK	AUS	Neil Young (to Perth Glory)
21	MF	AUS	Brodie Mooy (to Parramatta Eagles)
22	MF	AUS	Kaz Patafta (to Free Agent)

=== Youth squad ===
Note: Flags indicate national team as defined under FIFA eligibility rules; some limited exceptions apply. Players may hold more than one non-FIFA nationality.

No.	Pos.	Nation	Player
—	GK	AUS	Jack Duncan
—	DF	AUS	Jacob Pepper (Captain)
—	DF	AUS	Daniel Laiman
—	MF	AUS	Luke Remington
—	MF	AUS	David Talevski
—	MF	AUS	Kyle Ewart
—	MF	AUS	Abe Wheelhouse

No.	Pos.	Nation	Player
—	MF	AUS	Louis Bozanic
—	MF	AUS	Laaris Jagessar-Barnett
—	MF	AUS	Scott Pettit
—	MF	AUS	Andrew Hoole
—	FW	AUS	Blake Green
—	FW	AUS	Alex Read
—	FW	AUS	Kale Bradbery
—			+ up to four senior squad players
