= Dominik Ritter =

Swiss footballer (born 1989)

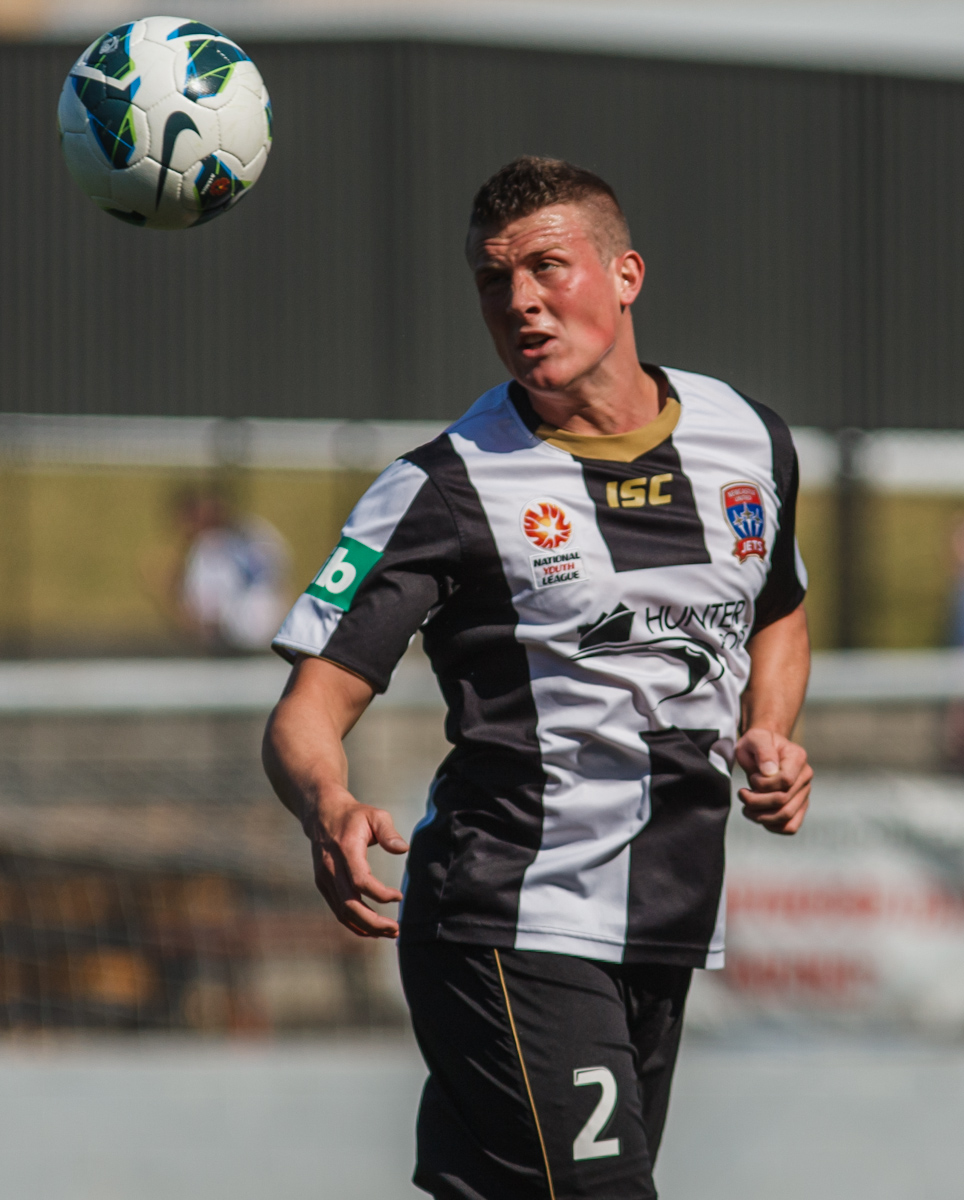
- Ritter playing for Newcastle Jets 2012

Personal information
- Date of birth: 23 June 1989 (age 37)
- Place of birth: Basel, Switzerland
- Height: 1.80 m (5 ft 11 in)
- Position: Left back

Youth career
- FC Biel-Benken
- –2009: FC Basel

Senior career*
Years	Team	Apps	(Gls)
2005–2009	FC Basel U21	24	(1)
2008–2009	→ Corncordia (loan)	17	(0)
2009–2010	FC Basel	0	(0)
2010–2011	→ FC Winterthur (loan)	25	(0)
2011–2012	FC Winterthur	12	(0)
2012–2013	Newcastle Jets	19	(0)
2013–2014	Old Boys	15	(2)
2014–2023	SC Binningen		

International career
2004–2005	Switzerland U-16	8	(0)
2005–2006	Switzerland U-17	6	(0)
2006–2007	Switzerland U-18	3	(0)
2007–2008	Switzerland U-19	9	(0)
2008–2010	Switzerland U-20	10	(0)
- * Club domestic league appearances and goals

Dominik Ritter (born 23 June 1989) is a Swiss former professional footballer who played as a defender, usually left-back or left midfielder.

== Career ==
=== Youth ===
Ritter started his youth football with the local amateur club in Biel-Benken, but soon moved on to FC Basel in their youth department and he advanced regularly through the ranks. He played in their U-18 team during the 2005–06 season, under coach Patrick Rahmen and his assistant Marco Walker and with them won both the Swiss U-18 championship and the U-19/18 national cup that season.

The following season he advanced to their U-21 team, who played in the third tier, and they won their division and became Swiss champions at U-21 level. A year later, the team defended their title as division (group2) winners in the 2007–08 season, and became Swiss champions at U-21 level again.

In July 2008, Ritter was loaned out to local second tier feeder club Concordia Basel for the 2008–09 Swiss Challenge League. The team were able to cause a sensation in the 2008–09 Swiss Cup, as they beat Servette 3-1 in the second round. Then they knocked out top tier team Xamax 4-0 in the third round. Ritter was shown the second yellow card shortly before the end of the match, but nevertheless Concordia qualified for the quarter-finals, but there, they were beaten 2–0 by Luzern.

After the loan period, Ritter advanced to Basel's first team ahead of their 2009–10 season under head coach Thorsten Fink. After playing in nine test games, Ritter played his debut for the club in the away game in the second qualifying round of the 2009–10 Europa League on 23 July 2009. He played the full 90 minutes as Basel won 4–1 against FC Santa Coloma of Andorra. He had two further appearances in the Europa League and played two games in the 2009–10 Swiss Cup. However, because he was unable to obtain a regular place in the Basel first team, he played six games in the U-21 team. At the end of the 2009–10 season he won the double with his club.

=== Winterthur ===
The club loaned Ritter out to FC Winterthur for the second half of the 2009–10 Challenge League season. He immediately became a regular starter and therefore the loan was prolonged for the 2010–11 season. On 15 June 2011 the transfer became definite.

=== Newcastle Jets ===
On 2 July 2012, it was announced he was signed by A-League club Newcastle Jets FC, on a one-year deal, to play in their 2012–13 season. Ritter played 19 games in the 2012–13 A-League. But at the end of the season he was released by the club, along with teammates Marko Jesic and Bernardo Ribeiro.

== Private life ==
Returning home to Switzerland in the summer of 2013, Ritter took a step back. He started studying economics and retired from professional football. He joined Old Boys, who at that time played semi-professionally in the third tier. His brother Tobias also joined the team. But he is not happy at OB, various disagreements with the coach and club management ultimately lead to a break between the club and the Ritter brothers.

This is when the next step back took place. A friend guides Ritter to SC Binningen in the 2. Liga Interregional, fifth tier of Swiss football. A little later, Tobias and the third brother, Fabian, also joined him there. They had also been FCB juniors. In 2017 Dominik Ritter completed vocational training as Mortgage Expert. He currently works for Manager Assurance EY Basel in auditing, tax advisory and management consulting.

== Titles and honours ==
FC Basel

- Swiss champion at U-18 level: 2005–06
- Swiss Cup at U-19/U-18 level: 2005–06
- Swiss champion at U-21 level: 2006–07, 2007–08
- Swiss Super League: 2009–10
- Swiss Cup: 2009–10

== Sources ==
- Josef Zindel (2018). FC Basel 1893. Die ersten 125 Jahre (in German). Basel: Friedrich Reinhardt Verlag. ISBN 978-3-7245-2305-5.
