= Gallaway =

Gallaway may refer to:

== Places ==
United States

- Gallaway, Tennessee

== Other uses ==
- Gallaway (surname)

== See also ==
- Galloway
