= Academia de Talentos =

- ADT Homepage screen.
- Type: Online newspaper
- Owner: André Figueiredo
- Editor: Sofia Vieira
- Founded: 2007
- Language: Portuguese
- Headquarters: Lisbon
- Website: academia-de-talentos.com

Academia de Talentos is a Portuguese online newspaper, dedicated to youth-level football.

== Foundation ==
In the last few years, some Portuguese players, including Luis Figo and Cristiano Ronaldo, have been in the headlines of newspapers all over the world. Youth football is growing, leading to the founding of the Academia de Talentos.

At this newspaper, readers can find match reports, interviews with coaches and players, transfers, and many other kinds of articles.

== Competitions ==
"Academia de Talentos" is focused in the coverage of S.L. Benfica, F.C. Porto and Sporting matches. This clubs have teams both at national championships (www.fpf.pt) and regional tournaments (Associação de Futebol de Lisboa e Associação de Futebol do Porto)

=== National ===
There are three national championships:

- Under-19
- Under-17
- Under-15

=== Other tournaments ===
"Academia de Talentos" has also followed some of the main Portuguese friendly tournaments at youth-level like Nike Premier Cup, Torneio Ponte de Frielas in Loures and the Taça Cidade dos Campeões at Vila Real de Santo António.

== Player articles ==
Some of the players that have had their careers chronicled at the paper:

- Rabiu Ibrahim
- Carlos Alberto
- Alexandre Pato
- Kerlon

== Interviews ==
Every week, "Academia de Talentos" produces an interview with one famous figure at the football industry. Here are some of main interviews:

- Carlos Queiroz, Portuguese national coach
- Ole Gunnar Solskjær, former Manchester United forward and current Reserve Squad Coach
- Rui Jorge, former Sporting and F.C. Porto left-back and current Belenenses youth-squad coach

== Quotations ==
Since its foundation, since it is a reference in the field of youth football,"Academia de Talentos" has been quoted in many Portuguese websites and forums and a special reference by Record (One of the top Portuguese sport's newspaper), sub-director Bernardo Ribeiro.
