= Joel Wood =

Joel Wood may refer to:

- Joel Wood (musician), Canadian musician
- Joel Wood (soccer), Australian football (soccer) player
