= Jack Duncan (soccer) =

Australian goalkeeper (born 1993)

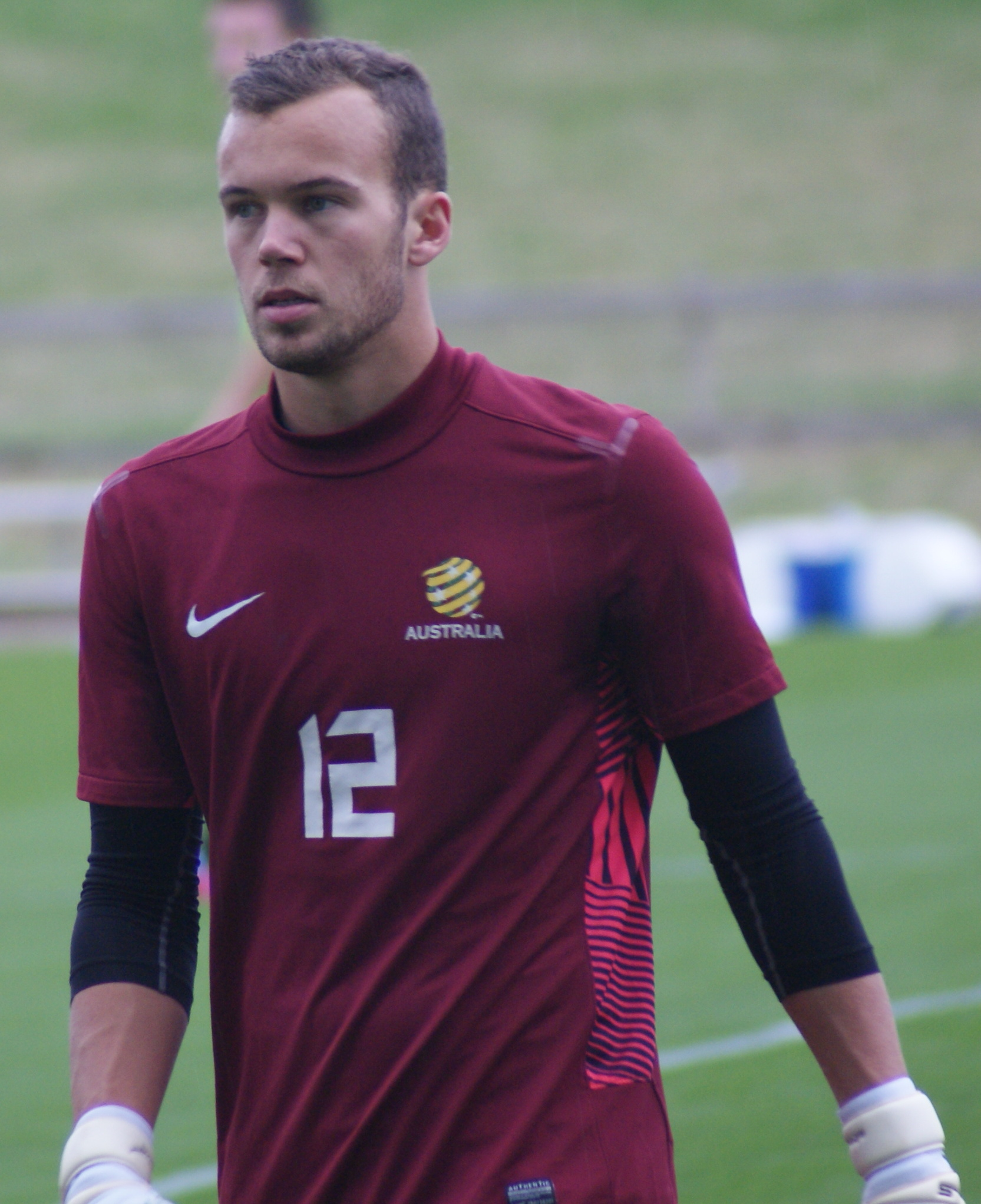
- Duncan playing for Australian U20 in 2013

Personal information
- Full name: Jack Carleton Duncan
- Date of birth: 19 April 1993 (age 33)
- Place of birth: Tasmania, Australia
- Height: 1.89 m (6 ft 2 in)
- Position: Goalkeeper

Team information
- Current team: Melbourne Victory
- Number: 25

Youth career
- 2010–2013: Newcastle Jets

Senior career*
Years	Team	Apps	(Gls)
2010	Sutherland Sharks	0	(0)
2010–2013	Newcastle Jets	1	(0)
2012–2013	Newcastle Jets NPL	9	(0)
2011–2012	Sutherland Sharks	3	(0)
2013–2015	Perth Glory	7	(0)
2014–2015	Perth Glory NPL	2	(0)
2015–2016	Randers FC	1	(0)
2016–2018	Newcastle Jets	44	(0)
2018–2020	Al-Qadsiah	57	(0)
2020–2023	Newcastle Jets	52	(0)
2023–2024	Wellington Phoenix	0	(0)
2024–	Melbourne Victory	30	(0)

International career^{‡}
2011–2013	Australia U-20	4	(0)
2014–2016	Australia U-23	9	(0)
- * Club domestic league appearances and goals as of 14 June 2025 ‡ National team caps and goals as of 17 January 2016

Jack Carleton Duncan (born 19 April 1993) is an Australian goalkeeper who plays for A-League Men club Melbourne Victory.

== Club career ==
=== Newcastle Jets ===
In 2010 Duncan signed for A-League club Newcastle Jets from NSW Premier League side Sutherland Sharks. He made his professional debut in the 2011-12 A-League season on 19 November 2011, in a round 7 clash against Brisbane Roar.

=== Perth Glory ===
On 2 May 2013, Duncan joined Perth Glory.

=== Randers FC ===
On 15 May 2015, Duncan signed a 2-year deal with Randers FC. He made his Danish Superliga debut on 16 May 2016 for the club in a 3–2 away victory over Viborg FF. In June 2016, Duncan asked to be released from his second contracted year with Randers FC because there was no indication to him becoming first choice.

=== Return to Newcastle Jets ===
On 24 June 2016, Duncan returned to Newcastle Jets, signing a 2-year deal.

=== Al-Qadsiah ===
On 31 July 2018, Duncan joined Saudi club Al Qadsiah, after triggering his release clause.

=== Third spell at Newcastle Jets ===
On 21 December 2020, Duncan returned to Newcastle Jets for a third spell, after two years in Saudi Arabia.

=== Wellington Phoenix ===
On 9 June 2023, Duncan joined New Zealand A-League Men club Wellington Phoenix, to provide competition for Alex Paulsen after the departure of Oli Sail to Perth Glory.

=== Melbourne Victory ===
On 8 July 2024, Duncan Joined Melbourne Victory on a 1 year contract.

== Career statistics ==
As of 21 December 2023

Club	Season	League			National Cup		Continental		Total	
Club	Season	Division	Apps	Goals	Apps	Goals	Apps	Goals	Apps	Goals
Newcastle Jets	2010–11	A-League	0	0	—		—		0	0
Newcastle Jets	2011–12	A-League	1	0	—		—		1	0
Newcastle Jets	2012–13	A-League	0	0	—		—		0	0
Newcastle Jets	Total		1	0	0	0	0	0	1	0
Perth Glory	2013–14	A-League	6	0	—		—		6	0
Perth Glory	2014–15	A-League	1	0	0	0	—		1	0
Perth Glory	Total		7	0	0	0	0	0	7	0
Randers	2015–16	Danish Superliga	1	0	1	0	0	0	2	0
Newcastle Jets	2016–17	A-League	25	0	—		—		25	0
Newcastle Jets	2017–18	A-League	19	0	1	0	—		20	0
Newcastle Jets	Total		44	0	1	0	0	0	44	0
Al Qadsiah	2018–19	Saudi Pro League	29	0	—		—		29	0
Newcastle Jets	2020–21	A-League Men	16	0	—		—		16	0
Newcastle Jets	2021–22	A-League Men	20	0	1	0	—		21	0
Newcastle Jets	2022–23	A-League Men	16	0	0	0	—		16	0
Newcastle Jets	Total		52	0	1	0	0	0	52	0
Wellington Phoenix	2023–24	A-League Men	0	0	0	0	—		0	0
Career total			134	0	3	0	0	0	137	0
