= Ruben Zadkovich =

Australian footballer (born 1986)

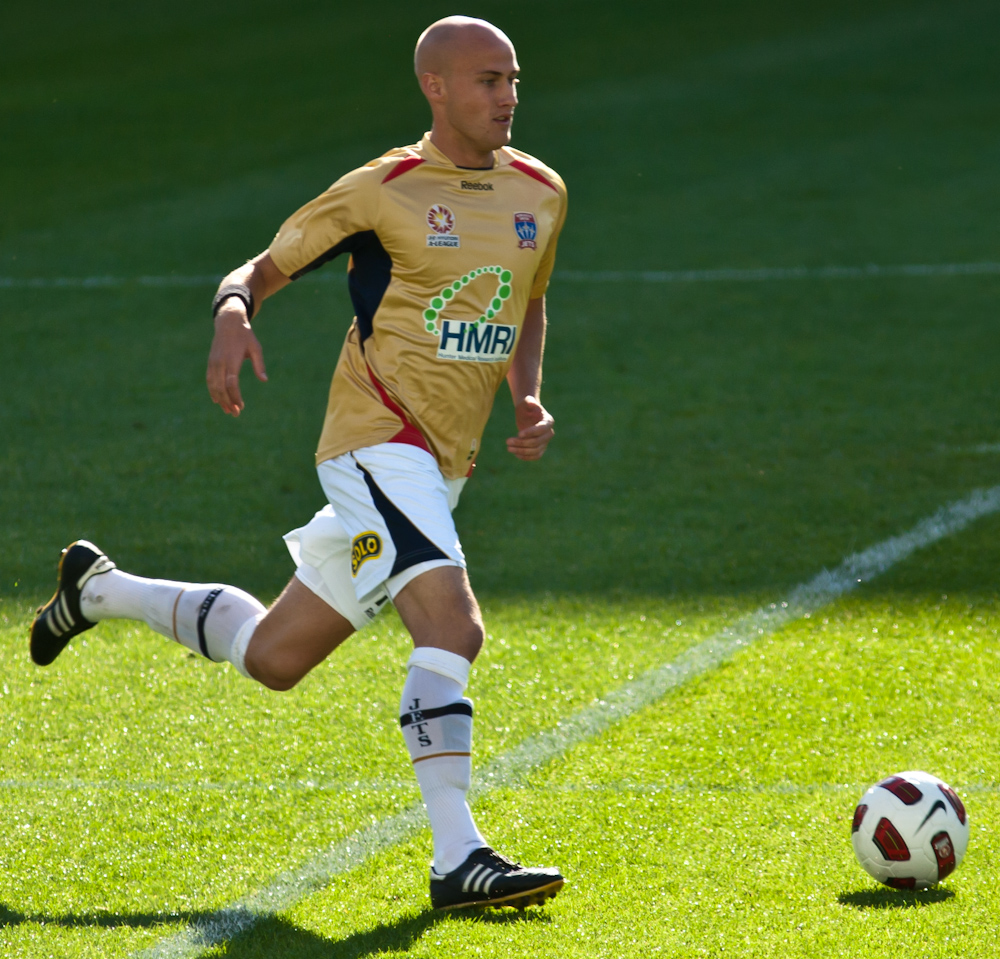
- Zadkovich playing for Newcastle Jets in 2010

Personal information
- Full name: Ruben Anton Zadkovich
- Date of birth: 23 May 1986 (age 40)
- Place of birth: Fairfield, Australia
- Height: 1.80 m (5 ft 11 in)
- Position: Central midfielder

Youth career
- –2004: Wollongong Wolves

Senior career*
Years	Team	Apps	(Gls)
2004–2005	Queens Park Rangers	0	(0)
2005	Notts County	9	(1)
2006–2008	Sydney FC	41	(2)
2008–2010	Derby County	5	(0)
2010–2014	Newcastle Jets	97	(6)
2014–2016	Perth Glory	13	(1)
Total		165	(10)

International career
2005	Australia U20	5	(0)
2006–2008	Australia U23	25	(1)
2008–2013	Australia	3	(0)

Managerial career
- 2016–2019: Broadmeadow Magic
- 2020: Hills United
- 2020–2022: Perth Glory (NPL)
- 2022–2023: Perth Glory
- 2024: Brisbane Roar (interim)
- 2024–2025: Brisbane Roar
- 2025–: Newcastle Jets (assistant coach)
- * Club domestic league appearances and goals

Ruben Anton Zadkovich (born 23 May 1986) is an Australian football manager and former player and former head coach of Broadmeadow Magic, Hills United, Perth Glory and Brisbane Roar. He played for six clubs in a career that spanned between England and Australia. Zadkovich was also capped for Australia, representing the Socceroos on three occasions.

== Club career ==
Born in Fairfield, Sydney, New South Wales, Zadkovich had previously played for English Football League club Notts County, scoring on his debut against Chester City, as well as Queens Park Rangers and Australian side Wollongong Wolves. He has also made several appearances for the Young Socceroos, most notably at the FIFA World Youth Championship.

=== Sydney FC ===
Following his time in England, Zadkovich returned to Australia in late 2005 and trialled for Sydney FC. He travelled with the squad to the FIFA Club World Championship and despite not making an appearance he impressed coach Littbarski, being called in as a short-term replacement for injured Ufuk Talay late in the season. After a 12th-minute debut off the bench against Queensland Roar, Zadkovich scored on his first start, against Perth Glory, during Sydney's run to the inaugural A-League championship, earning him a two-year full-time contract. He was allowed to leave the club in March 2008.

=== Derby County ===
On 17 April 2008, it was revealed Zadkovich had signed a two-year deal with English club Derby County, although his registration was unable to be completed before 1 July. Zadkovich made his Derby debut as a second-half substitute against Norwich City at Pride Park in October 2008, in a match which Derby won 3–1. He struggled with injuries during his time at Derby and, after seven appearances for the club, cancelled his contract by mutual consent on 23 January 2010.

=== Newcastle Jets ===
On 6 April 2010, Zadkovich confirmed that he had signed a three-year contract with the Newcastle Jets which would see him return to play his football in Australia. Zadkovich played 97 games over four seasons with the Jets. He was appointed captain in his third season and led the team until he was recruited by Perth Glory in 2014.

=== Perth Glory ===
On 29 May 2014, Zadkovich received an early release from Newcastle Jets and signed with Perth Glory. On 15 November 2014, Zadkovich made his debut, coming on as a substitute against Western Sydney Wanderers. On 22 November 2014, Zadkovich came on as a substitute against Wellington Phoenix in the 61st minute but was sent off after seventeen seconds due to a two-footed tackle. On 8 May 2016, after not playing a single match in the season due to injury, Zadkovich retired from playing football.

== International career ==
Zadkovich made his debut for Australia at right-back in the last home game of the first round of the 2010 World Cup qualifications, against China, at ANZ Stadium on 22 June 2008. He took part in the 2008 Olympics with Australia. He scored from close range in a 1–1 draw with Serbia, Australia's only goal in an unsuccessful campaign.

== Managerial career ==
=== Broadmeadow Magic ===
Zadkovich's first foray as a club manager arose when he was announced as the manager for Football Northern New South Wales club Broadmeadow Magic.

=== Hills United ===
Zadkovich was appointed manager of Hills United in September 2020, leaving the role one month later.

=== Perth Glory ===
Zadkovich was appointed assistant manager of Perth Glory in October 2020. In March 2022, he was named interim head coach of the Glory following the departure of Richard Garcia. The 2021–22 season ended with Glory finishing bottom of the A-league table for the first time in their history. He was appointed as permanent head coach in May 2022.

During the 2022–23 season, news surfaced that Zadkovich had punched midfielder Giordano Colli during training, with the coach moving quickly to dispel any notion of a rift.

Zadkovich departed Perth Glory after his first full season in charge, following a ninth-placed finish.

=== Brisbane Roar ===
In January 2024, Brisbane Roar appointed Zadkovich as assistant to Ben Cahn for the remainder of the 2023–24 season. Soon after, Zadkovich was elevated to the head coach position, when Cahn went on long-term medical leave due to thyroid cancer and throat surgery. He managed the Brisbane Roar team that took part in 2024 Bhausaheb Bandodkar Memorial Trophy in India.

Brisbane Roar's start to the 2024–25 season was disastrous, where they set a new club record of 13 games without a win. They also broke the A-League record for consecutive home defeats when they lost to the Newcastle Jets.

== Career statistics ==
Appearances and goals by club, season and competition
Club	Season	League			National cup		League cup		Continental		Total	
Club	Season	Division	Apps	Goals	Apps	Goals	Apps	Goals	Apps	Goals	Apps	Goals
Notts County	2004–05	League Two	8	1	0	0	0	0	–		8	1
Notts County	2005–06	League Two	1	0	0	0	0	0	–		1	0
Notts County	Total		9	1	0	0	0	0	0	0	9	1
Sydney FC	2005–06	A-League	6	1	–		0	0	0	0	6	1
Sydney FC	2006–07	A-League	19	1	–		0	0	3	0	22	1
Sydney FC	2007–08	A-League	16	0	–		2	1	0	0	18	1
Sydney FC	Total		41	2	0	0	2	1	3	0	46	3
Derby County	2008–09	Championship	5	0	0	0	2	0	–		7	0
Derby County	2009–10	Championship	0	0	0	0	0	0	–		0	0
Derby County	Total		5	0	0	0	2	0	0	0	7	0
Newcastle Jets	2010–11	A-League	21	2	–		–		0	0	21	2
Newcastle Jets	2011–12	A-League	23	1	–		–		0	0	23	1
Newcastle Jets	2012–13	A-League	26	3	–		–		0	0	26	3
Newcastle Jets	2013–14	A-League	27	0	–		–		0	0	27	0
Newcastle Jets	Total		97	6	0	0	0	0	0	0	97	6
Perth Glory	2014–15	A-League	13	1	2	0	–		0	0	15	1
Perth Glory	2015–16	A-League	0	0	0	0	–		0	0	0	0
Perth Glory	Total		13	1	2	0	0	0	0	0	15	1
Career total			165	10	2	0	4	1	3	0	174	11

== Managerial statistics ==
As of 3 January 2026

Team	Nat	From	To	Record				
Team	Nat	From	To	G	W	D	L	Win %
Perth Glory	(Australia)	March 2022	May 2023	37	8	10	19	21.62
Brisbane Roar FC	(Australia)	February 2024	May 2025	39	8	10	21	20.51
Total				76	16	20	40	21.05

== Honours ==
=== Player ===
Sydney FC

- A-League Championship: 2005–06

Australia U20

- OFC U-20 Championship: 2005

=== Manager ===
Broadmeadow Magic

- National Premier Leagues Northern NSW Championship: 2018
