= Gallaway (surname) =

Gallaway is a surname. Notable people with the surname include:

- Garth Gallaway, sports commentator
- Iain Gallaway, sports commentator
- Roger Gallaway, Canadian educator and politician
- Sam Gallaway (born 1992), Australian soccer player
- Walter H. Gallaway (1870–1911), artist
