= Jacob Pepper =

Australian soccer player

Personal information
- Full name: Jacob Scott Pepper
- Date of birth: 8 May 1992 (age 34)
- Place of birth: New Lambton Heights, Australia
- Height: 1.80 m (5 ft 11 in)
- Position: Defensive midfielder

Team information
- Current team: Newcastle Suns

Youth career
- West Wallsend
- 2007–2008: NSWIS
- 2008–2010: Newcastle Jets

Senior career*
Years	Team	Apps	(Gls)
2010–2015	Newcastle Jets	74	(2)
2012	Newcastle Jets NPL	7	(1)
2015–2016	Western Sydney Wanderers	11	(0)
2016–2020	Brisbane Roar	64	(1)
2020–2021	Madura United	2	(0)
2022	Cooks Hill United	17	(0)
2023–2024	Edgeworth Eagles	15	(4)
2024–2025	Newcastle Olympic	15	(1)
2025–	Newcastle Suns	0	(0)

International career^{‡}
2012	Australia U23	1	(0)
- * Club domestic league appearances and goals as of 18 August 2024 ‡ National team caps and goals as of 29 October 2010

Jacob Scott Pepper (born 8 May 1992) is an Australian professional soccer player who currently plays for Newcastle Suns as a defensive midfielder in Newcastle Zone League One.

== Career ==
=== Newcastle Jets ===
On 18 December 2010, Pepper made his senior debut in a 4–0 loss to Wellington Phoenix. On 14 February 2012 it was announced he had signed a two-year contract extension with Newcastle Jets. Pepper has since cemented his spot in the starting XI with a string of impressive performances towards the backend of the 2011–12 season. This included a brace of goals in a 3–1 win away against a star-studded Melbourne Victory side, and a deserved call-up to the youth international scene.

=== Western Sydney Wanderers ===
On 9 June 2015, he was signed by the Western Sydney Wanderers on a 1-year contract.

On 29 June 2016, Pepper was released by the Wanderers.

=== Brisbane Roar ===
In July 2016, Pepper joined Brisbane Roar. Pepper made his Brisbane Roar debut in Roar's Round 1 clash against Melbourne Victory, coming on for Thomas Broich in the 74th minute. The game ended 1–1, after a 96th minute Brisbane equaliser. He spent most of the 2017–18 season as a makeshift central defender due to several injuries at the club, Pepper has started a total of 10 games at centre back so far this season, earning many plaudits for his performances. He left Brisbane Roar in March 2020.

=== Madura United ===
After leaving Brisbane Roar, Pepper joined Indonesian club Madura United.

== International career ==
On 7 March 2011 he was selected to represent the Australia Olympic football team in an Asian Olympic Qualifier match against Iraq.

== Career statistics ==
As of 6 September 2021

Club	Season	League			Cup		Others		Continental		Total	
Club	Season	Division	Apps	Goals	Apps	Goals	Apps	Goals	Apps	Goals	Apps	Goals
Newcastle Jets	2010–11	A-League	6	0	0	0	0	0	—	—	6	0
Newcastle Jets	2011–12	A-League	17	2	0	0	0	0	—	—	17	2
Newcastle Jets	2012–13	A-League	9	0	0	0	0	0	—	—	9	0
Newcastle Jets	2013–14	A-League	19	0	0	0	0	0	—	—	19	0
Newcastle Jets	2014–15	A-League	23	0	0	0	0	0	—	—	23	0
Newcastle Jets	Newcastle Jets total		74	2	0	0	0	0	—	—	74	2
Western Sydney Wanderers	2015–16	A-League	11	0	2	0	0	0	—	—	13	0
Western Sydney Wanderers	WSW total		11	0	2	0	0	0	—	—	13	0
Brisbane Roar	2016–17	A-League	12	0	0	0	0	0	4 (Note: Appearances in the AFC Champions League.)	0	16	0
Brisbane Roar	2017–18	A-League	19	1	0	0	0	0	—	—	19	1
Brisbane Roar	2018–19	A-League	21	0	1	0	0	0	—	—	22	0
Brisbane Roar	2019–20	A-League	12	0	1	0	0	0	—	—	13	0
Brisbane Roar	Brisbane Roar total		64	1	4	0	0	0	4	0	72	1
Madura United	2020–21	Liga 1	2	0	4	0	0	0	—	—	6	0
Madura United	Madura United total		2	0	4	0	0	0	—	—	6	0
Cooks Hill United FC	2022	National Premier Leagues Northern NSW	17	0	0	0	0	0	-	-	17	0
Cooks Hill United FC	Cooks Hill Total		17	0	0	0	0	0	-	-	17	0
Edgeworth FC	2023	National Premier Leagues Northern NSW	15	4	1	0	0	0	-	-	16	4
Career total			183	7	11	0	0	0	4	0	198	7
