= Matthew Nash =

Australian soccer player and coach

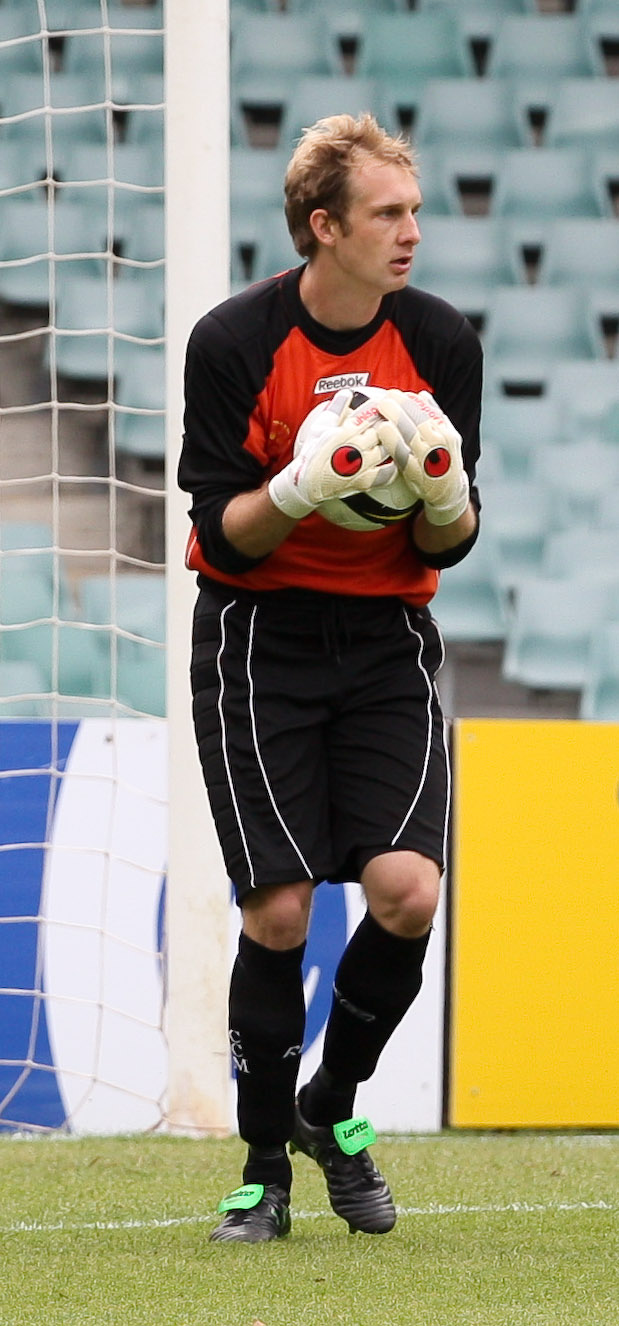
- Nash playing for Central Coast Mariners Youth in 2008

Personal information
- Full name: Matthew Ian Nash
- Date of birth: 3 April 1981 (age 45)
- Place of birth: Sydney, Australia
- Height: 1.84 m (6 ft 0 in)
- Position: Goalkeeper

Team information
- Current team: Sydney FC (goalkeeping coach)

Senior career*
Years	Team	Apps	(Gls)
2004	Port Kembla		
2006–2008	APIA Leichhardt Tigers		
2007	Sydney FC	1	(0)
2008–2010	Central Coast Mariners	0	(0)
2008	→ Adelaide United (loan)	0	(0)
2009	→ Penrith Nepean United (loan)	14	(0)
2010	APIA Leichhardt Tigers	26	(0)
2010–2012	Newcastle Jets	8	(0)
2012	Parramatta FC	22	(0)
2012	Newcastle Jets	5	(0)
2012–2013	Sydney FC	0	(0)
2013–2014	Bonnyrigg White Eagles	45	(0)
2014–2015	Central Coast Mariners	2	(0)

Managerial career
- 2015–2019: Central Coast Mariners (goalkeeper coach)
- 2019–: Sydney FC (goalkeeper coach)
- * Club domestic league appearances and goals as of 2 November 2014

Matthew Ian Nash (born 3 April 1981) is a former Australian goalkeeper and current goalkeeping coach for Sydney FC in the A-League.

== Club career ==
Nash played for Port Kembla FC in the Illawarra League, before moving to NSW Premier League side APIA Leichhardt Tigers in 2007. After winning the 2007 Johnny Warren Cup, APIA missed out on a finals place, finishing fifth.

After trialling with Sydney FC in the 2007 pre-season, Nash was offered a short-term contract for the 2007–08 A-League season as cover for injured reserve keeper Ivan Necevski. On 9 September 2007, he made his A-League debut in place of Clint Bolton who was on international duty. His strong performance impressed, with Nash keeping a clean-sheet. His short-term contract finished on 10 October 2007, on Necevski's return from injury.

Nash was loaned to Adelaide United for four weeks to cover for the injured Mark Birighitti. He signed for APIA Leichhardt Tigers in the NSW Premier League.

Nash signed with the Newcastle Jets to cover for injured keeper Neil Young after the exit of the current replacement keeper Paul Henderson to rivals Central Coast Mariners. Nash made his debut for the club in a 2–0 win over North Queensland Fury.

On 31 October 2012, Nash joined the Newcastle Jets for a second stint, providing injury cover for Ben Kennedy who underwent knee surgery, and Mark Birighitti who fractured his cheekbone. This left only Nash and youth player Jack Duncan as Newcastle's goalkeepers.

Nash joined Sydney FC as an injury cover for Ivan Necevski.

On 28 July 2014 the Central Coast Mariners confirmed that Nash would be joining the team on a two-year contract at the conclusion of the 2014 NPL NSW Men's 1 season. On 7 July 2015 it was announced that Nash would retire as a goalkeeper and become the club's goalkeeping coach following the departure of previous goalkeeping coach John Crawley.

Nash joined Sydney FC as a full-time goalkeeping coach after the departure of John Crawley on the 13th of June 2019.
