= Argirita =

Municipality in Minas Gerais, Brazil

Coordinates: 21°37′S 42°50′W

- Municipality
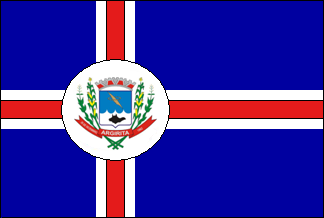
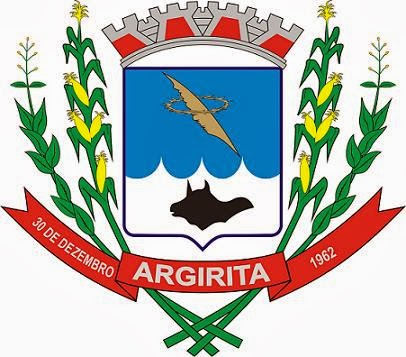
- Flag Coat of arms
- Interactive map of Argirita
- Country: Brazil
- State: Minas Gerais
- Region: Southeast
- Time zone: UTC−3 (BRT)

Location of Argirita within Minas Gerais

Argirita is a municipality in the state of Minas Gerais, Brazil. Its population as of 2020 is estimated to be 2,704 people living in a total area of 159.33 km^{2} (61.52 sq mi). The city belongs to the mesoregion of Zona da Mata and to the microregion of Cataguases.

== See also ==
- List of municipalities in Minas Gerais
