= Ben Kennedy (soccer, born 1987) =

Australian soccer player

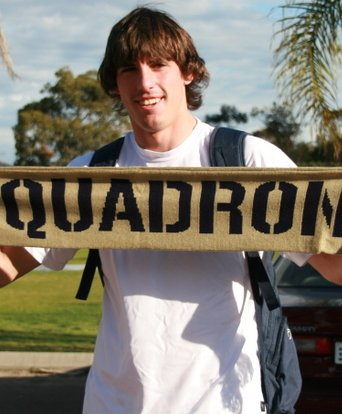
- Kennedy in 2007

Personal information
- Full name: Benjamin Kennedy
- Date of birth: 14 February 1987 (age 39)
- Place of birth: Newcastle, Australia
- Height: 1.89 m (6 ft 2 1/2 in)
- Position: Goalkeeper

Youth career
- Thornton
- South Wallsend
- Newcastle Jets

Senior career*
Years	Team	Apps	(Gls)
2006–2017	Newcastle Jets	114	(0)
2017–2019	Central Coast Mariners	45	(0)
2019–2026	Lambton Jaffas	145	(0)

International career^{‡}
2006	Australia U20	1	(0)
2007	Australia U23	1	(0)
- * Club domestic league appearances and goals as of 16 August 2026 ‡ National team caps and goals as of 12 November 2010

Benjamin Kennedy (born 14 February 1987) is a former Australian professional soccer player who played as a goalkeeper for Newcastle Jets, Central Coast Mariners in the A-League Men from 2006 to 2019 and for Lambton Jaffas in the National Premier Leagues Northern NSW from 2019 to 2026.

== Club career ==
=== Newcastle Jets ===
Kennedy was a train-on player for the Newcastle Jets, but was brought into the full squad for the 2006–07 season. Until half-way through the season, Newcastle only had the inexperienced Kennedy as a registered goalkeeper in their squad, until former Socceroo Ante Covic joined the squad.

Kennedy became the Jets first-choice goalkeeper for the 2009–10 season thanks to some strong performances in the 2009 AFC Champions League, after the departure of Ante Covic to Sweden. However, he was criticised by his coach Branko Čulina for poor performances during the season and making mistakes that cost the Jets vital points.

He was replaced as Newcastle's first choice keeper by Neil Young, due to impressive performances by the 30-year-old. Young was injured when he broke his nose and Kennedy came back into the team. Kennedy was the hero in the finals match against Gold Coast United, making crucial saves throughout the game and saving two penalties, in a game that Newcastle won 6–5.

Kennedy started the 2014–15 season as 2nd choice keeper to Mark Birighitti. He made his season debut in Round 8, and his no.1 spot was cemented when Mark Birighitti left temporarily due to a 6-month loan deal at Italian Serie B club A.S. Varese. In the Jet's Round 27 clash away to the Brisbane Roar, Kennedy produced a number of great saves to deny Brisbane going 5–0 up in the first half. Despite this, the Jets were downed 2–1 due to goals from Kofi Danning and Lachlan Jackson, but Kennedy's performance was rewarded with a place in the Team of the Week. Kennedy made a total of 84 saves, only being outnumbered by rival custodian Liam Reddy.

=== Central Coast Mariners ===
After 10 years at the Newcastle Jets, Kennedy joined their F3 Derby rivals Central Coast Mariners on a one-year deal in June 2017. He made his A-League debut for the Mariners in a 0–0 draw away to Brisbane Roar in November that year replacing the injured Tom Glover in the team.

== Career statistics ==
As of 23 September 2014

CS = Clean Sheets

Club	Season	League^{1}		Cup		International^{2}		Total	
Club	Season	Apps	CS	Apps	CS	Apps	CS	Apps	CS
Newcastle Jets	2006–07	14	3	6	1	–	–	20	4
Newcastle Jets	2007–08	0	0	0	0	–	–	0	0
Newcastle Jets	2008–09	0	0	0	0	5	1	5	1
Newcastle Jets	2009–10	21	3	–	–	–	–	21	3
Newcastle Jets	2010–11	26	6	–	–	–	–	26	6
Newcastle Jets	2011–12	24	5	–	–	–	–	24	5
Newcastle Jets	2012–13	2	0	–	–	–	–	2	0
Newcastle Jets	2013–14	4	2	–	–	–	–	4	2
Newcastle Jets	2014–15	21	3	1	0	–	–	22	3
Newcastle Jets	2015–16	2	0	0	0	–	–	2	0
Newcastle Jets	2016–17	0	0	1	0	–	–	1	0
Newcastle Jets	Total	112	22	7	1	5	1	127	24
Central Coast Mariners	2017–18	21	5	1	0	–	–	22	5
Central Coast Mariners	2018–19	22	0	0	0	–	–	0	0
Central Coast Mariners	Total	43	5	1	0	0	0	22	5
Lambton Jaffas FC	2019	9		-	-	-	-		
Lambton Jaffas FC	2020	13		-	-	-	-		
Lambton Jaffas FC	2021	16		-	-	-	-		
Lambton Jaffas FC	2022	23		-	-	-	-		
Lambton Jaffas FC	2023	17		-	-	-	-		
Lambton Jaffas FC	2024	23		-	-	-	-		
Lambton Jaffas FC	2025	23		-	-	-	-		
Lambton Jaffas FC	2026	21		-	-	-	-		
Lambton Jaffas FC	Total	145							
Career total		300	27	8	1	5	1	252	29

^{1} – includes A-League final series statistics
^{2} – includes FIFA Club World Cup statistics; AFC Champions League statistics are included in season closing during group stages (i.e. ACL 2009 and A-League season 2008–09 etc.)

== Personal life ==
Kennedy is in a relationship with Samantha Poolman, the Giants Netball player. They share a home in East Maitland

== Honours ==
Newcastle Jets:

- A-League Championship: 2007–08
