= Ali Abbas (footballer) =

Iraqi footballer (born 1986)

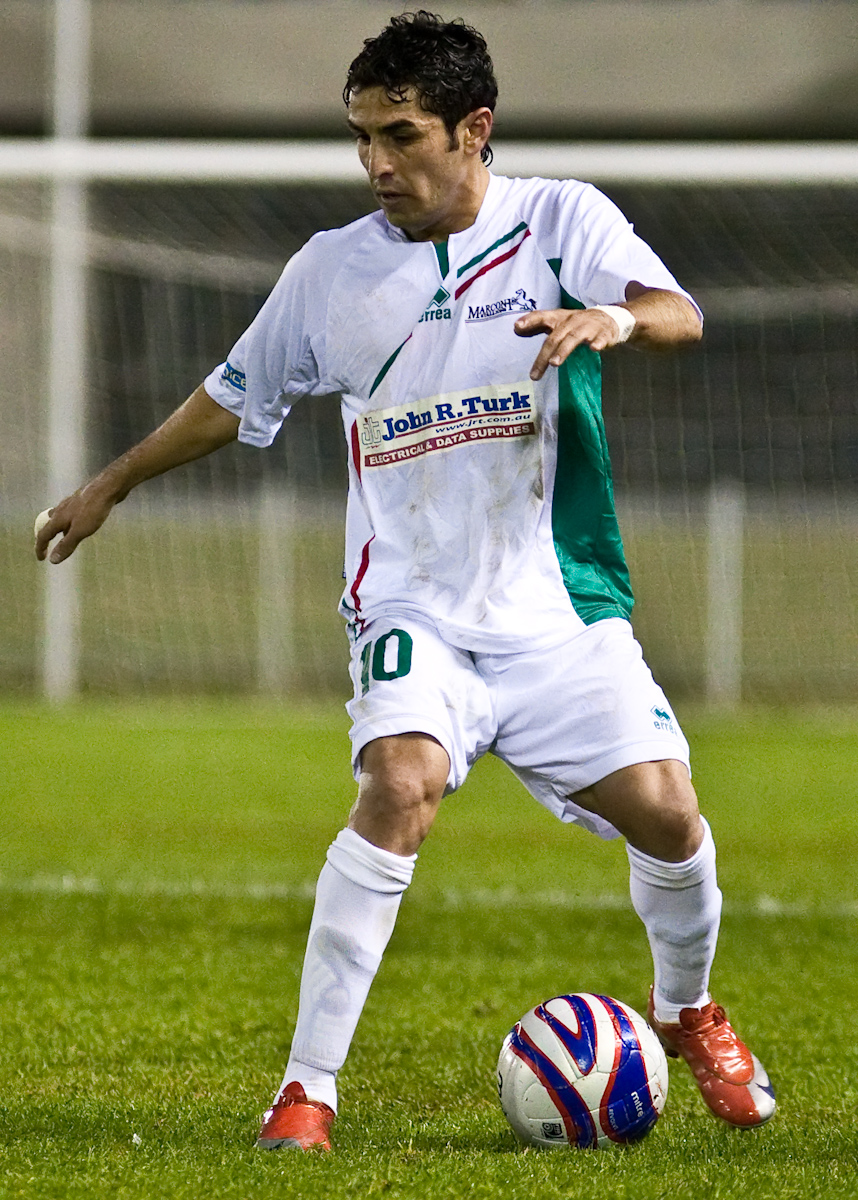
- Abbas with Marconi Stallions in 2009

Personal information
- Full name: Ali Abbas Mshehed Al-Hilfi
- Date of birth: 30 August 1986 (age 40)
- Place of birth: Baghdad, Iraq
- Height: 1.70 m (5 ft 7 in)
- Positions: Left winger; central midfielder; left-back

Senior career*
Years	Team	Apps	(Gls)
2005–2006	Al-Talaba		(2)
2007–2009	Al-Quwa Al-Jawiya		(1)
2009	Marconi Stallions	29	(8)
2009–2012	Newcastle Jets	60	(4)
2012–2016	Sydney FC	68	(5)
2016–2017	Pohang Steelers	10	(1)
2017–2018	Wellington Phoenix	8	(0)
2018	Wellington Phoenix Reserves	1	(0)
2020–2021	Newcastle Jets	18	(0)

International career^{‡}
2007	Iraq U23	4	(1)
2007–2016	Iraq	12	(0)
Medal record
Men's football
Representing Iraq
AFC Asian Cup
Winner	2007 Indonesia/Malaysia/ Thailand/Vietnam
- * Club domestic league appearances and goals as of 16 May 2021 ‡ National team caps and goals as of 6 September 2016

Ali Abbas Mshehed Al-Hilfi (Arabic: علي عباس مشيهد الحلفي , born 30 August 1986) is an Iraqi former footballer who played as a left winger, central midfielder, or left-back.

== Club career ==
In November 2007 Ali Abbas, along with Ali Mansour and Ali Khudhair grabbed global headlines by seeking asylum in Australia after playing against the Olyroos for the Iraqi Under-23 side in an Olympic Games qualifier in Gosford.

He had talks with Marconi Stallions at the time but returned to Iraq early in 2008 after discussions with the Iraqi Football Association and joined Al-Quwa Al-Jawiya in Baghdad. In February 2009, Marconi reached an agreement with Iraqi club, Al-Quwa Al-Jawiya, for Abbas to join them permanently.

=== Marconi Stallions ===
In the opening game of the NSW Premier League season, Abbas scored a stunning curling free-kick for Marconi in his first game for the club in their 2–0 victory over Penrith Nepean United at Marconi Stadium. He also helped Marconi secure second spot in the 2009 New South Wales Premier League season before signing with A-league side, Newcastle United Jets.

=== Newcastle Jets ===
Abbas trialled with Newcastle Jets before the start of the 2009–10 regular season under then Newcastle coach, Gary Van Egmond, but was ultimately not signed. However, on 18 September 2009, Abbas signed for the club as an injury replacement player for Shaun Ontong. He scored his first Jets goal on 12 February 2010 in a 2–1 loss to Adelaide United. Abbas re-signed with the Jets for another season seeing him play until the conclusion of the 2010–11 A-League season. He gained a contract extension which ended at the close of the 2011–12 season.

=== Sydney FC ===
On 21 May 2012, it was announced Abbas had signed for Sydney FC on a 2-year deal. Notably a left winger and having spent his entire pre-season playing in that role, Abbas was shifted into the central midfield role by manager Ian Crook early in the 2012–13 season. He scored his first competitive goal for the club against Central Coast Mariners on 3 November 2012 after latching onto the end of a reverse pass by Yairo Yau to volley it over goalkeeper Mathew Ryan.

On 12 August 2014, Abbas scored two extra time penalties for Sydney FC in the club's first ever FFA Cup match away to Melbourne City. The game was locked at 1–1 at full time and looked to be set for penalties before firstly Corey Gameiro and then Terry Antonis were fouled in the penalty area, allowing Abbas to slot home in the 111th and 114th minutes respectively, giving Sydney FC a 3–1 win at the end of extra time. On 29 November 2014, in the Sydney Derby at Parramatta Stadium, Abbas suffered a severe knee injury which would prevent him playing for the rest of the season. The incident occurred in the opening exchanges of the game when Iacopo La Rocca collided heavily with Abbas. The injury caused tears to both his anterior cruciate and medial collateral ligaments of his knee.

After being sidelined for 405 days, Abbas returned to the squad on 9 January 2016 for a match against his former club, Newcastle Jets. He netted Sydney's second goal of the night, concluding the 2–0 win.

On 1 May 2016, Sydney FC released Abbas to allow him to pursue a career opportunity overseas.

=== Pohang Steelers ===
On 12 May 2016, Abbas Joined South Korean Club Pohang Steelers on a one-and-a-half-year contract.

=== Wellington Phoenix ===
On 23 August 2017, Abbas signed a two-year contract to play for Wellington Phoenix as an injury replacement for Louis Fenton. After Abbas only played 640 minutes across eight games, Abbas and the Phoenix agreed to part ways.

=== Newcastle Jets ===
In December 2020, Abbas signed a one-year deal with the Newcastle Jets.

== International career ==
Despite playing only one of Iraq's six matches in the 2008 Asian Olympic qualifiers, the 20-year-old midfielder was called into the senior national team in the 2007 WAFF Championship. After starting his career with Al Talaba, he joined Al-Quwa Al-Jawiya in July 2006. He lifted the Asian Cup Trophy in 2007.

In September 2014, Abbas was recalled by the national team for the first time in 7 years as part of an extended squad for friendly games against Bahrain and Yemen.

Abbas was called up to the national squad for the final stage of World Cup qualifying against Australia in Perth in September 2016.

== Personal life ==
On 26 January 2012, Abbas became an official Australian citizen and from then on was not counted against foreign player quotas in the A-League. His nephew Mohammed Ridha Jalil is also an Iraqi international footballer.

== Career statistics ==
=== Club ===
As of 1 May 2016

Club	Season	League			Cup		Continental		Total	
Club	Season	Division	Apps	Goals	Apps	Goals	Apps	Goals	Apps	Goals
Marconi Stallions	2009	NSW Premier League	29	8	—		—		29	8
Newcastle Jets	2009–10	A-League	17	1	—		—		17	1
Newcastle Jets	2010–11	A-League	24	1	—		—		24	1
Newcastle Jets	2011–12	A-League	19	2	—		—		19	2
Newcastle Jets	Total		60	4	—		—		60	4
Sydney FC	2012–13	A-League	24	1	—		—		24	1
Sydney FC	2013–14	A-League	28	2	—		—		28	2
Sydney FC	2014–15	A-League	7	0	3	3	—		10	3
Sydney FC	2015–16	A-League	9	2	0	0	4	0	13	2
Sydney FC	Total		68	5	3	3	4	0	75	8
Career total			211	32	3	3	4	0	218	35

== Honours ==
Iraq

- AFC Asian Cup: 2007

=== Individual ===
- A-League All Star: 2014
