= Killing of Tony Robinson =

Shooting in Madison, Wisconsin

Shooting of Tony Robinson
- Location of Madison, within Dane County, and Dane County within Wisconsin
- Date: March 6, 2015
- Time: 6:30 p.m.
- Location: Williamson Street, Madison, Wisconsin, U.S.
- Participants: Matthew Kenny (police officer); Tony Robinson (deceased)
- Deaths: Tony Robinson
- Charges: None filed

On March 6, 2015, Tony Robinson, an unarmed 19-year-old man, was fatally shot by police officer Matthew Kenny In Madison, Wisconsin, during a "check-person" call. Kenny was responding to dispatch reports that Robinson was jumping in front of cars and acting erratically, and once on scene he assumed that Robinson had harmed someone in an apartment. On May 12, 2015, Robinson's shooting was found to be justified self-defense by the Dane County District Attorney Ismael Ozanne. The death was protested by the community and family; Robinson was biracial, with a black father and a white mother.

== Shooting ==
On March 6, 2015, the police received reports that 19-year-old Tony Robinson was yelling and jumping in front of cars. Robinson had reportedly been running in and out of the street while shouting at bystanders. Some of the reports were from friends of Robinson, who were concerned by his erratic behavior and called for help. The original caller and witnesses all stated that Robinson was unarmed and expressed concern over his well-being.

45-year-old officer Matt Kenny responded to the call to "check person" at 6:30 pm. Kenny was backed up by Sergeant Gary and Officer Christian. Gary and Christian arrived to the front of the residence as Kenny was standing in the entrance to the stairwell by the open door.

Kenny went into the open side porch door into a stairway of twelve steps. According to Kenny, based upon shouting he overheard, he believed that Robinson was assaulting someone in the second-floor apartment, and went in to stop it. Kenny encountered Robinson at the top of the stairs, who punched Kenny in the head. Kenny said he feared for his life, thinking he could be knocked down the stairs and have his weapon taken, and fatally shot Robinson. The Robinson estate's description of the events alleges that Kenny was dispatched to a "check person" call, knew that he should wait for backup, but entered the building with his weapon drawn anyway. The estate further said that, as Kenny stood near the bottom of the stairwell, Robinson appeared at the top, and Kenny fired unnecessarily. They further stated that Robinson fell down the stairs and Kenny fired the fatal shots as he lay helpless at the bottom of the stairs.

Sergeant Gary, first on scene after Kenny, asked Kenny if Robinson had any weapons. Kenny replied that Robinson did not have any weapons. Gary saw Robinson laying at the bottom of the stairs on his back with his feet out the door. Gary saw Robinson gasp for breath and pull his hands inward toward the front of his body near his stomach. Gary noted that Robinson had nothing in his hands. Gary also noted that Kenny appeared to have no injuries. Physical evidence at the scene showed all bullet casings at the bottom of the stairs, the entryway, and outside the stairwell on the porch. Squad video footage showed Kenny exiting the house as he was firing the final 3-4 shots. Further evidence at the scene showed Robinson's blood on the wall at 5 feet above the top of the fifth step from the entryway.

Gary went upstairs and "cleared" the apartment but did not find anyone. Kenny went to the hospital, and photographs indicate that he had a cut on the left side of his head, near his hairline. Medical personnel cleaned the cut and did not need to bandage it. 28 days later, Officer Kenny claimed to have suffered a concussion in the course of the event with Robinson. However, Judge James Petersen ruled that Kenny's claims of concussion were not verifiable. Kenny's medical expert, Andrew Dennis, DO, acknowledged that despite the officer's claims on workman's compensation forms, there was no objective evidence in the record that Kenny suffered a concussion.

Robinson was taken to the University of Wisconsin Hospital in Madison where he was pronounced dead. Autopsy results confirmed that Robinson had been struck by 7 bullets that were from 0–5 foot range. Robinson was determined post-mortem to have ingested Xanax, psilocybin mushrooms, and THC hours before the shooting. The drugs may have contributed to his erratic behavior.

== Background ==
Court documents show that Robinson was on probation after pleading guilty to armed robbery in 2014. This stemmed from a home-invasion robbery in which Robinson was caught by police fleeing the scene, armed with a fake, but realistic-looking gun.

In 2007, Officer Matt Kenny had shot and killed Ronald Brandon, who was standing on the porch of his home, holding what was later learned to be a pellet gun. The case was determined to be "suicide by cop".

== Aftermath ==
The community protested about Robinson's death. Some 1,500 protesters, mostly high school students who had staged a walk-out, filled the state capitol on March 9 to protest against Robinson's death, yelling the "Hands up, don't shoot" chant through the capitol building.

The Wisconsin Department of Justice investigated the Robinson shooting, as required by Wisconsin law. Robinson's uncle said that the family had faith that the Division of Criminal Investigation will "handle [the investigation] with integrity".

In 2015, Future released a song called March Madness in which he addresses police shootings. The accompanying music video, directed by Vincent Lou, specifically addresses the shooting of Tony Robinson.

On May 12, 2015, Dane County District Attorney, Ismael Ozanne, announced that Officer Matt Kenny would not face charges for the shooting of Tony Robinson. The shooting was labeled a "lawful use of deadly police force."

In February 2017, Robinson's mother, Andrea Irwin, accepted a $3.35 million settlement from the city, to settle a civil rights lawsuit, filed under the 14th and 4th amendments.

== See also ==
- List of unarmed African Americans killed by law enforcement officers in the United States
