= Marcello Fiorentini =

Italian football player

Personal information
- Full name: Marcello Fiorentini
- Date of birth: 29 August 1980 (age 46)
- Place of birth: Rome, Italy
- Height: 1.78 m (5 ft 10 in)
- Position: Midfielder

Team information
- Current team: FC Hanau 93

Youth career
- 1994–1998: Lazio

Senior career*
Years	Team	Apps	(Gls)
1998–2001	Lazio	3	(0)
2000–2001	→ Pescara (loan)	29	(1)
2001–2004	Montichiari	62	(1)
2005	Caravaggese	5	(0)
2006	Seregno	14	(2)
2007–2008	Salò	26	(4)
2009	Palazzolo	11	(0)
2010–2011	Newcastle Jets	16	(0)
2012–2013	Viktoria Aschaffenburg	31	(6)
2013–2014	SV Heimstetten	16	(0)
- * Club domestic league appearances and goals as of 16:47, 3 February 2011 (UTC)

Marcello Fiorentini (born 29 August 1980) is an Italian football player currently playing for the FC Hanau 93.

== Career ==
Marcello Fiorentini played for SS Lazio in the late 1990s, however his career declined and he ended up in the Serie C and Serie D with A.C. Palazzolo 1913 and Delfino Pescara 1936. He was signed by Newcastle Jets manager Branko Culina along with former Chinese International Zhang Shuo after a week-long trial in which he impressed significantly. After one season at the Jets, Fiorentini failed to make an impact and was released.
