= Joel Wood (soccer) =

Australian soccer player

Personal information
- Full name: Joel James Wood
- Date of birth: 24 June 1984 (age 42)
- Place of birth: Sydney, Australia
- Position: Forward

Senior career*
Years	Team	Apps	(Gls)
20xx–2008	Lake Macquarie City FC	20	(13)
2008	Broadmeadow Magic FC	13	(6)
2008–20xx	Tuen Mun Progoal FC		(1)
2009	Newcastle Jets FC	1	(0)
2010–2011	Edgeworth FC	39	(36)
2012	Sydney Olympic FC		
2012	Parramatta FC		
2014–2015	Maitland FC		
2016–2017	Lambton Jaffas FC	18	(6)
2017	Byron Bay Rams	19	(20)
2018–	Valentine FC	17	(8)
- * Club domestic league appearances and goals

Joel Wood (born 24 June 1984 in Sydney, Australia) is an Australian soccer player who plays for Maitland FC in the NNSW NPL. Besides Australia, he has played in Hong Kong.

== Career ==
Earning a six-day trial with Fourway Athletic of the Hong Kong First Division League in summer 2008, Wood was unable to agree on terms with the club so assented to a season-long professional contract with Tuen Mun Progoal in September, scoring his only goal in a 4–2 win over Xiangxue Eisiti. '

In 2021, he left Valentine FC.
