= Bernardo Ribeiro =

Brazilian footballer (1989-2016)

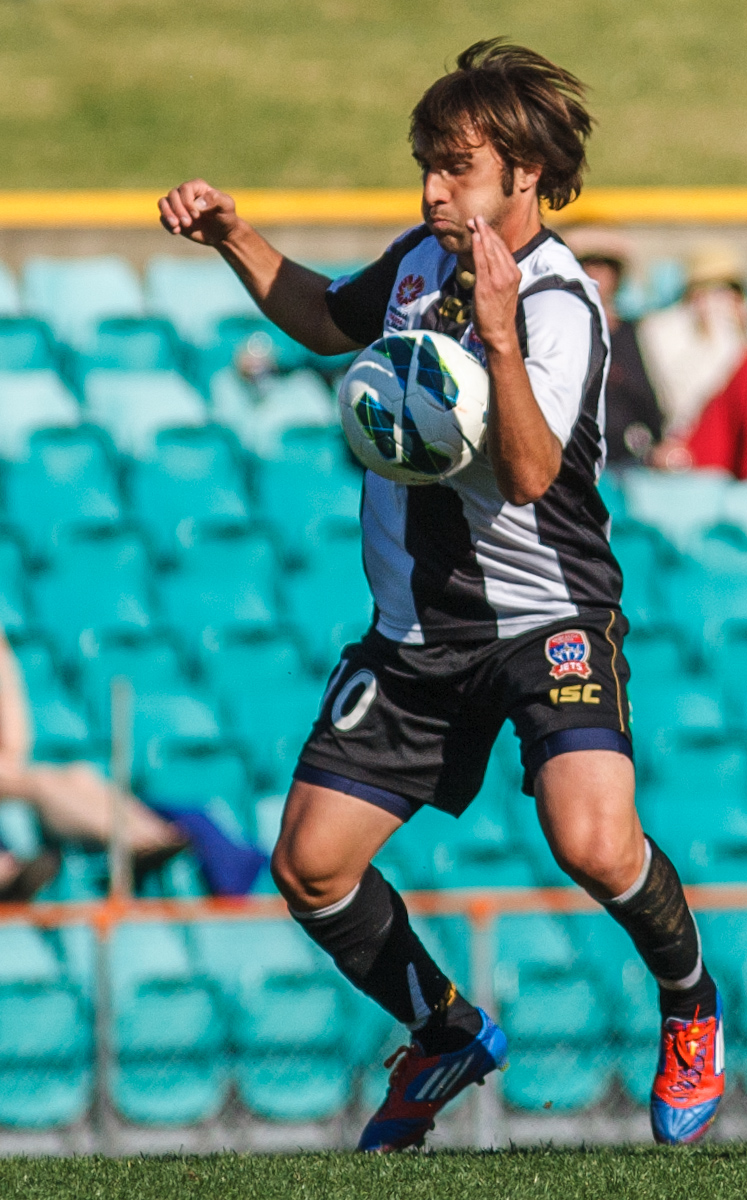
- Ribeiro with Newcastle Jets in 2012

Personal information
- Full name: Bernardo Salim Ribeiro
- Date of birth: 9 October 1989
- Place of birth: Nova Friburgo, Rio de Janeiro, Brazil
- Date of death: 7 May 2016 (aged 26)
- Place of death: Recreio, Minas Gerais, Brazil
- Height: 1.72 m (5 ft 8 in)
- Position: Attacking midfielder

Youth career
- 2000–2009: Flamengo

Senior career*
Years	Team	Apps	(Gls)
2011–2012	KF Skënderbeu Korçë	5	(1)
2012–2013	Newcastle Jets	6	(0)
2013–2014	IFK Mariehamn	32	(2)
2015	Inter de Lages	0	(0)
2016	Friburguense AC	9	(0)
2016	Ideal EC (Recreio, MG)		
Total		52	(3)
- * Club domestic league appearances and goals

Bernardo Salim Ribeiro (9 October 1989 – 7 May 2016) was a Brazilian footballer who played as an attacking midfielder. As a young player he moved to Europe, where he played in Italy, Albania (where he won the national championship of 2012 with Skënderbeu Korçë), and Finland. He also played in the Australian first division. Upon returning to Brazil, he died in the aftermath of a match for an amateur club after suffering cardiac arrest.

== Career ==
=== Early life ===
Bernardo grew up in Nova Friburgo, where he first started playing basketball at the age of 5, but being the shortest player on his team he struggled to make an impact. He then turned his attention to football at a young age, which became his passion. Bernardo also had an Italian passport. His mother Dr Jamila Calil Salim Ribeiro, a neurosurgeon, served at times as alderman and health secretary of Nova Friburgo and stood in 2010 for the Partido Popular Socialista as candidate for the federal parliament.

=== Youth ===
He was spotted by Flamengo and joined the club in 1999 at the age of 9, where he played for the youth levels, where he was even captain. During his teens with Flamengo he featured in many youth tournaments such as the FIFA Youth Cup, where he was acknowledged as "gaining a reputation for his pin-point passes and ability to read play".

=== Skënderbeu Korçë ===
In February 2011 he moved to the Albanian champions Skënderbeu Korçë. Ownership issues prevented the transfer from becoming official before the end of June 2011. In the season 2011-12 the club defended the league title, but Ribeiro did not get beyond five short second half stints in the team where he scored one goal. At the begin of the season he also played in two matches of the European Champions League Qualification, where the opponent Apoel Nicosia prevailed with an aggregate result of 6-0.

=== Newcastle Jets ===
On 6 August 2012 he signed for the Australian A-League club Newcastle Jets. Newcastle finished the season 8th amongst the ten clubs. In none of his six matches for the Jets Ribeiro was used for the full 90 minutes, but three times he was part of the starting line-up.

=== IFK Mariehamn ===
After the end of the A-League season Ribeiro moved to Finland where he joined first division club IFK Mariehamn midseason, as in the Scandinavian country seasons follow the calendar year. There he was to substitute his injured compatriot Diego Assis. From matchday 21 on 29 July he was in the starting formation for the remaining 13 matches and scored two goals. The club finished the league on the 4th spot. 2014 he played in 19 league matches for the side, which finished this time as 5th. In both seasons Marienhamn also advanced to the semifinals of the national cup competition.

=== Return to Brazil ===
After this he returned to Brazil where in August 2015 he joined the cast of EC Internacional in the city of Lages in the southern Brazilian state of Santa Catarina. At that stage Ribeiro was not authorised to play for the club which then was competing in the national fourth division, the Série D. Inter de Lages hoped to use Ribeiro from the beginning of 2016 in the state championship.

However Ribeiro was presented the opportunity to return to his hometown Nova Friburgo and Inter de Lages allowed him on the best of terms to leave for Friburguense AC. In February 2016 he married Katie Ayscough, originating from Maitland near Newcastle whom he met when playing in Australia. Inter de Lages president Cristopher Nunes attended the festivities. In the 2016 Rio de Janeiro State Championship Ribeiro played in nine of the 15 matches of his new club which ended up relegated.

After the end of the season he joined for the time being amateur club Ideal EC in Recreio, a small provincial city in the state of Minas Gerais ca. 100 km north of Nova Friburgo. With the club he contested the matches for the IV Copa dos Campeões, organised by the Liga Esportiva de Cataguases (→ Cataguases). At the match against AD Independente of Argirita that started at 20:00 hours on 7 May 2016 he felt unwell shortly before half-time of a match in the Estádio Alcides Campos. He was substituted and still on the grass, suffered a cardiac arrest. He was seen to by paramedics on location and soon transferred to the local hospital São Sebastião where he was declared dead at ca. 21:30 hours in the evening.

His brother Luiz Gabriel Salim Ribeiro, generally known as Gabriel Ribeiro, born 1 September 1984, pursued at the time a career in Italian amateur football.

== Honours ==
Skënderbeu Korçë

- Championship of Albania: 2012
