= Neil Young (soccer, born 1979) =

Australian soccer player

Personal information
- Full name: Neil Young
- Date of birth: 14 August 1979 (age 47)
- Place of birth: Perth, Western Australia
- Height: 1.87 m (6 ft 1 1/2 in)
- Position: Goalkeeper

Senior career*
Years	Team	Apps	(Gls)
1996–2008	Sorrento FC	303	(0)
2008–2009	Melbourne Knights	26	(0)
2009–2011	Newcastle Jets	9	(0)
2011–2013	Perth Glory	0	(0)

Managerial career
- 2011–2014: Perth Glory (GK Coach)
- 2014–2015: Newcastle Jets (GK Coach)
- 2015–2016: Kerala Blasters (GK Coach)
- 2016–2017: Bangkok Glass (GK Coach)
- 2018–2019: Buriram United (Youth) (GK Coach)
- 2019–2021: Melbourne City (GK Coach)
- * Club domestic league appearances and goals as of 16:47, 13 November 2010 (UTC)

Neil Young (born 14 August 1979) is a retired goalkeeper who played for Sorrento FC, Melbourne Knights, Newcastle Jets and Perth Glory. He was previously the Head Goalkeeper Coach of A-League club Melbourne City FC.

== Club career ==
=== Sorrento FC ===
Young played for the majority of his career in the Football West State League with Sorrento FC. During this time he had trials with Crewe Alexandra, Stockport County and A.F.C. Bournemouth in England, before moving to Victoria to play for Melbourne Knights in 2008.

=== Newcastle Jets ===
Signed just prior to the beginning of the 2009-10 Hyundai A-League season as back-up to young Novocastrian goalkeeper Ben Kennedy, Young made his debut for the Jets at EnergyAustralia Stadium on 8 November 2009 against North Queensland Fury after Kennedy was forced out during the warm-up by a groin injury. Although rarely called upon due to the good form of Newcastle's defence, Young enjoyed a solid debut performance and kept a clean sheet in the 2–0 victory.

In the Jets' clash against Gold Coast United on 13 January, Young was kicked in the face by Gold Coast striker Shane Smeltz when diving on a loose ball in the 18-yard box. The injury sidelined Young for the final four games of the regular season and an adverse reaction to medication meant the 30-year-old shot stopper missed the play-off final, which Newcastle won 6–5 on penalties. Young was left fighting for his life and remained in intensive care for more than 6 weeks, losing 20 kilograms (25% of his body weight) in the process. Doctors had to remove his large intestine and he stopped producing white blood cells in addition to bone marrow failure.

=== Perth Glory ===
On 28 February 2011, Young signed a two-year contract with A-League outfit Perth Glory, as the substitute goalkeeper to Danny Vuković.

== Coaching ==
Young's first movement into coaching came due to an injury sustained while playing at Newcastle Jets. While under contract as a goalkeeper at Perth Glory in 2011 Young was appointed Head Goalkeeper Coach at the club. After a change of manager in 2014 Young moved back to the Jets, and at the end of his one-year contract he was appointed Goalkeeping Coach for Indian Super League side Kerala Blasters, working alongside Peter Taylor. Once his contract had expired at the end of the 2015–16 Super League tournament, Young was appointed the Goalkeeping Coach for Thai Premier League side Bangkok Glass F.C., working alongside Aurelio Vidmar. Following the expiration of his contract, Young moved to the Thai League 1 Champions Buriram United as Head of Goalkeeping, working within the Youth Development Academy.

Appointed in July 2019, Young is currently Head Goalkeeper Coach of Melbourne City FC.

== A-League career statistics ==
(Correct as of 19 February 2012)

Club	Season	League			Finals			Asia			Total		
Club	Season	Apps	Goals	Assists	Apps	Goals	Assists	Apps	Goals	Assists	Apps	Goals	Assists
Newcastle Jets	2009–10	9	0	0	-	-	-	-	-	-	9	0	0
Newcastle Jets	2010–11	0	0	0	-	-	-	-	-	-	0	0	0
Perth Glory	2011–12	1	0	0	-	-	-	-	-	-	0	0	0
Total		9	0	0	-	-	-	-	-	-	9	0	0
