= Mario Šimić =

Croatian footballer

Personal information
- Full name: Mario Šimić
- Date of birth: 28 December 1989 (age 36)
- Place of birth: Jajce, SFR Yugoslavia
- Height: 1.74 m (5 ft 8 1/2 in)
- Position: Left back

Team information
- Current team: NK Oroslavje

Youth career
- Sydney United
- HNK Zmaj Makarska
- 2009–2011: Newcastle Jets

Senior career*
Years	Team	Apps	(Gls)
2008	Zmaj Makarska	0	(0)
2009	Sydney United	12	(0)
2011–2012	Newcastle Jets	5	(0)
2012–2013	Sydney United 58	15	(0)
2013–2014	Zmaj Makarska	15	(2)
2014–2017	NK Lučko	13	(0)
2017–2023	NK Oroslavje	91	(54)
- * Club domestic league appearances and goals as of 18 April 2024

Mario Šimić (born 28 December 1989) is a Croatia footballer who last played for NK Oroslavje, who compete in the 2.ŽNL Krapina-Zagorje league, in Croatia.

== Club career ==
Mario Šimić made his professional debut in the A-League on 2 February 2011 in a round 25 clash against Melbourne Victory coming off the bench in the 73rd minute of the game in a 2–0 loss. In September 2017, Mario signed with NK Oroslavje on a free transfer from NK Lučko.
