= Marko Jesic =

Australian soccer player

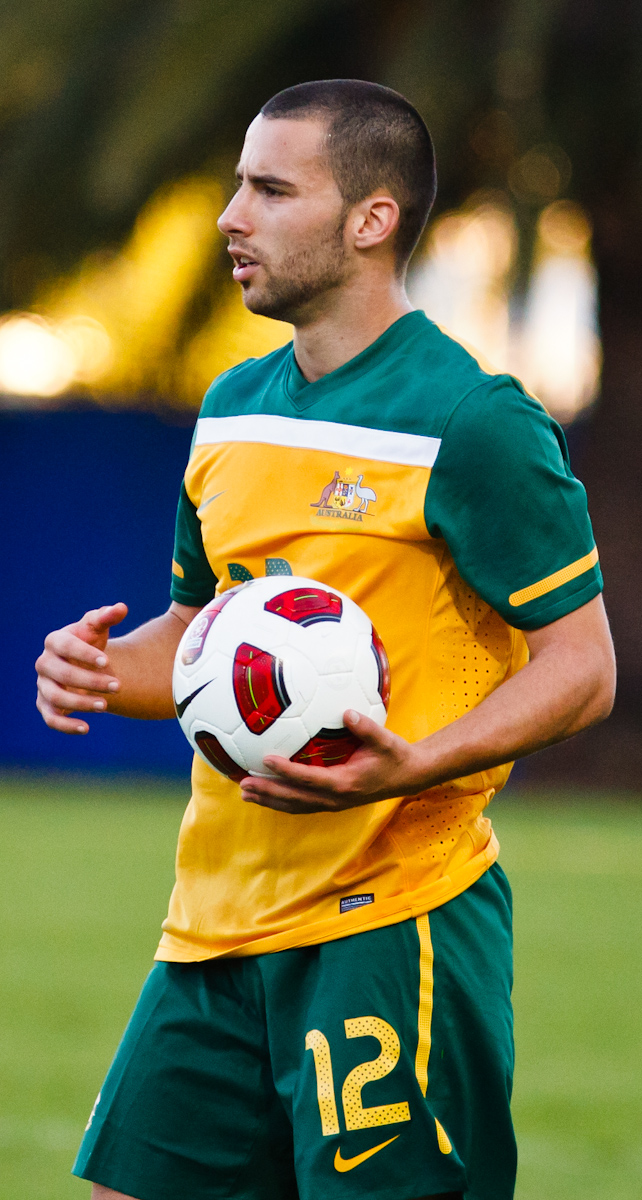
- Jesic playing for the Olyroos in 2011

Personal information
- Full name: Marko Danny Jesic
- Date of birth: 7 August 1989 (age 37)
- Place of birth: Fairfield, New South Wales, Australia
- Height: 1.78 m (5 ft 10 in)
- Positions: Winger; forward

Team information
- Current team: Marconi Stallions

Youth career
- Marconi Stallions
- 2005–2006: NSWIS
- 2006–2007: AIS
- 2008: Newcastle Jets

Senior career*
Years	Team	Apps	(Gls)
2008–2013	Newcastle Jets	52	(10)
2013–2014	Sun Pegasus	8	(2)
2014–2015	Rockdale City Suns	30	(13)
2015–	Marconi Stallions	205	(112)

International career
2006–2007	Australia U17	5	(2)
2007–2009	Australia U20	11	(5)
2010–2011	Australia U23	9	(3)
- * Club domestic league appearances and goals as of 23 January 2025

Marko Jesic (born 7 August 1989) is an Australian soccer player who plays for Marconi Stallions FC.

== Club career ==
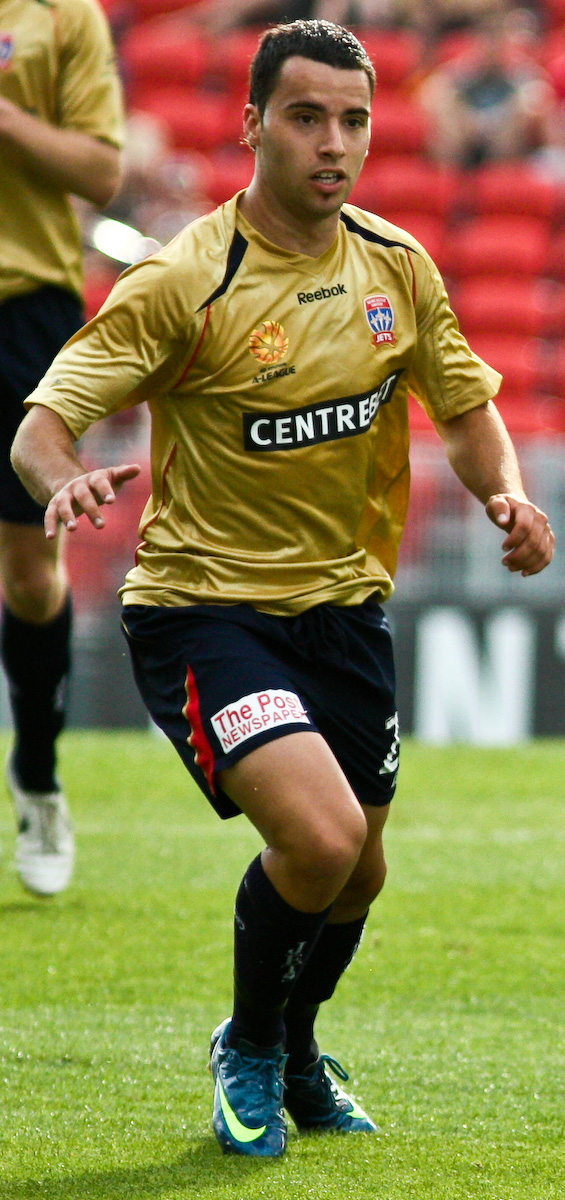
Jesic playing for the Newcastle Jets

Jesic grew up on the streets of Bossley Park in Sydney's south west and was promoted to the Newcastle Jets A-League squad after playing in the youth league. Jesic is a graduate from the Australian Institute of Sport.

=== Newcastle United Jets ===
Marko started his football career at AIS. Upon his graduation from the Australian Institute of Sport he moved to Newcastle United Jets in 2008. On 6 October 2008 he made his A-League debut for Newcastle United Jets as a substitute against Wellington Phoenix. In his second game Marko scored his first goal for the Jets on his starting debut in Newcastle's 1–0 win over Melbourne Victory on 18 October 2008 in the 86th minute.

In 2009 Marko competed in the AFC Champions League with the Newcastle United Jets. On 7 April 2009 Newcastle Jets played against Nagoya Grampus and he was the man of the match.

=== Sun Pegasus ===
On 30 December 2013 it was announced that Marko had signed with Hong Kong club Sun Pegasus.

=== Return to Rockdale ===
On his return to Rockdale, he scored a brace in the opening game of the 2015 NPL NSW season against APIA Leichhardt in their 4–2 loss.

=== Marconi Stallions ===
In October 2015, Marconi Stallions announced that they had signed Jesic, along with other high-profile names, for their 2016 NPL2 campaign.

== Honours ==
With Australia:

- International Cor Groenewegen Tournament (U-20): 2009
- AFF U19 Youth Championship: 2008
- Weifang Cup (U-18): 2007

== Honours ==
Sun Pegasus

- Hong Kong Senior Challenge Shield Runners-up: 2013–14
