= Sam Gallaway =

Australian soccer player

Personal information
- Full name: Samuel Gallaway
- Date of birth: 16 March 1992 (age 34)
- Place of birth: Coffs Harbour, Australia
- Height: 1.84 m (6 ft 1/2 in)
- Positions: Center back; right back; left back

Team information
- Current team: Bonnyrigg White Eagles
- Number: 16

Youth career
- Coffs City United FC
- 2007–2008: NSWIS
- 2008–2010: AIS
- 2010–2015: Newcastle Jets

Senior career*
Years	Team	Apps	(Gls)
2008	AIS	35	(3)
2011–2015	Newcastle Jets	41	(0)
2012	Newcastle Jets NPL	6	(0)
2015	Western Sydney Wanderers	15	(0)
2016–	Bonnyrigg White Eagles	190	(9)

International career^{‡}
2007–2009	Australia U-17	3	(0)
- * Club domestic league appearances and goals as of 28 June 2025 ‡ National team caps and goals as of 22 January 2011

Sam Gallaway (born 16 March 1992 in Coffs Harbour, Australia) is an Australian football (soccer) player.

== Career ==
On 22 January 2011, Gallaway made his senior debut for Newcastle against Gold Coast United.

2014-2015 season:: Although he has struggled to cement a spot in the starting 11 Gallaway is still thought of as an important member of the team. As a result of the signing of Sam Gallagher he was pushed back to the bench. Gallaway started his first game of the season in round 7 against the Western Sydney Wanderers, The game ended 1–1. At the conclusion of the 2014–15 A-League Season, Sam Gallaway was released from the club.
