= 2014–15 Newcastle Jets FC season =

Newcastle Jets
2014–15 season
- Chairman: Nathan Tinkler
- Manager: Phil Stubbins
- Stadium: Hunter Stadium, Newcastle
- A-League: 10th
- FFA Cup: Round of 32
- Top goalscorer: League: Edson Montaño (6); All: Edson Montaño (6)
- Highest home attendance: 11,884 vs Melbourne Victory; 8 November 2014
- Lowest home attendance: 4,162 vs Perth Glory; 6 April 2015
| Home colours | Away colours |

The 2014–15 Newcastle Jets FC season was the club's 14th season since its establishment in 2000. The club participated in the A-League for the 10th time and the FFA Cup for the first time.

== Players ==
=== Squad information ===
Note: Flags indicate national team as defined under FIFA eligibility rules; some limited exceptions apply. Players may hold more than one non-FIFA nationality.

| No. | Pos. | Nation | Player |
|---|---|---|---|
| 1 | GK | AUS | Jess Vanstrattan |
| 2 | DF | AUS | Scott Neville |
| 3 | DF | AUS | Taylor Regan (captain) |
| 5 | MF | AUS | Ben Kantarovski |
| 7 | MF | SRB | Enver Alivodić |
| 8 | MF | AUS | Zenon Caravella |
| 10 | FW | AUS | Travis Cooper |
| 11 | DF | AUS | Andrew Hoole |
| 12 | DF | AUS | Sam Gallagher |
| 13 | FW | ECU | Edson Montaño (on loan from Barcelona SC) |
| 15 | MF | AUS | Josh Barresi |

| No. | Pos. | Nation | Player |
|---|---|---|---|
| 16 | MF | AUS | Jacob Pepper |
| 17 | FW | AUS | James Virgili |
| 18 | DF | AUS | Allan Welsh |
| 19 | MF | AUS | Mitch Cooper |
| 20 | GK | AUS | Ben Kennedy |
| 21 | DF | AUS | Daniel Mullen |
| 22 | DF | KOR | Lee Ki-Je |
| 25 | FW | AUS | Brandon Lundy |
| 30 | GK | AUS | John Solari |
| 31 | MF | AUS | Max Burgess |

Current Trialists

- (Australia) Allan Welsh – (Australia) Croydon Kings – signed
- (Australia) Ryan Ensor – (Australia) SWQ Thunder
- (Australia) Brendan Cholakian – (Australia) Manly United
- (Australia) Iqi Jawadi – (Australia) South Melbourne
- (Australia) Robert Paratore – (England) Leicester City

=== From youth squad ===
| N | Pos. | Nat. | Name | Age | Notes |
|---|---|---|---|---|---|
| 26 | DF | (Australia) | Nick Cowburn | 31 | |
| 27 | FW | (Australia) | Radovan Pavicevic | 31 | |
| 28 | FW | (Australia) | Braedyn Crowley | 30 | |
| 29 | MF | (Australia) | Michael Kantarovski | 31 | |

=== Transfers in ===
| No. | Pos. | Nat. | Name | Age | Moving from | Type | Transfer window | Ends | Transfer fee | Source |
|---|---|---|---|---|---|---|---|---|---|---|
| 6 | DF | (Australia) | Adrian Madaschi | 31 | Jeju United (South Korea) | Transfer | Pre-season | 2015 | Free | |
| 13 | MF | (Australia) | Josh Barresi | 19 | Western Sydney Wanderers | Transfer | Pre-season | 2015 | Free | |
| 10 | FW | (Argentina) | Marcos Flores | 28 | Central Coast Mariners | Transfer | Pre-season | 2015 | Free | |
| 22 | MF | (Northern Ireland) | Jonny Steele | 28 | New York Red Bulls (United States) | Transfer | Pre-season | 2016 | Free | |
| 12 | DF | (Australia) | Sam Gallagher | 23 | Hà Nội (Vietnam) | Transfer | Pre-season | 2015 | Free | |
| 8 | FW | (Ecuador) | Edson Montaño | 23 | Barcelona SC (Ecuador) | Loan | Pre-season | 2015 | Free | |
| 7 | FW | (Argentina) | Jerónimo Neumann | 28 | Adelaide United | Transfer | Pre-season | 2016 | Free | |
| 14 | MF | (Australia) | Billy Celeski | 29 | Liaoning Whowin (China) | Transfer | Pre-season | 2015 | Free | |
| 18 | DF | (Australia) | Allan Welsh | 20 | Croydon Kings | Transfer | Pre-season | 2015 | Free | |
| 8 | MF | (Australia) | Zenon Caravella | 31 | Far North Queensland | Transfer | Pre-season | 2015 | Free | |
| 21 | DF | (Australia) | Daniel Mullen | 25 | Western Sydney Wanderers | Transfer | Mid-season | 2015 | Free | |
| 10 | FW | (Australia) | Travis Cooper | 21 | VVV-Venlo (Netherlands) | Transfer | Mid-season | 2015 | | |
| 22 | DF | (South Korea) | Lee Ki-je | 23 | Shimizu S-Pulse (Japan) | Transfer | Mid-season | 2015 | | |
| 1 | GK | (Australia) | Jess Vanstrattan | 32 | Central Coast Mariners Academy | Transfer | Mid-season | 2015 | Free | |
| 7 | MF | (Serbia) | Enver Alivodić | 30 | Vojvodina (Serbia) | Transfer | Mid-season | 2015 | | |
| 31 | MF | (Australia) | Max Burgess | 20 | Sydney FC | Transfer | Mid-season | 2015 | Free | |

=== Transfers out ===
| No. | Pos. | Nat. | Name | Age | Moving to | Type | Transfer window | Transfer fee | Source |
|---|---|---|---|---|---|---|---|---|---|
| 22 | FW | (Australia) | Adam Taggart | 21 | Fulham (England) | Transfer | Pre-season | Undisclosed | |
| 15 | MF | (Australia) | Joshua Brillante | 21 | Fiorentina (Italy) | Transfer | Pre-season | Undisclosed | |
| 18 | MF | (Australia) | James Brown | 24 | Melbourne City | Transfer | Pre-season | Free | |
| 12 | DF | (Australia) | Connor Chapman | 19 | Melbourne City | Transfer | Pre-season | Free | |
| 8 | MF | (Australia) | Ruben Zadkovich | 28 | Perth Glory | Transfer | Pre-season | Free | |
| 6 | MF | (Australia) | Zenon Caravella | 31 | Far North Queensland | Released | Pre-season | | |
| 13 | MF | (Australia) | Joey Gibbs | 22 | APIA Leichhardt Tigers | Released | Pre-season | | |
| 14 | DF | (Australia) | Josh Mitchell | 30 | Liaoning Whowin (China) | Released | Pre-season | | |
| 24 | MF | (Australia) | Mitchell Oxborrow | 19 | | Released | Pre-season | | |
| 11 | DF | (Australia) | Craig Goodwin | 22 | Adelaide United | Transfer | Pre-season | Free | |
| 22 | MF | (Northern Ireland) | Jonny Steele | 28 | | Released | Mid-season | | |
| 21 | DF | (Australia) | Sam Gallaway | 22 | Western Sydney Wanderers | Transfer | Mid-season | Free | |
| 10 | MF | (Argentina) | Marcos Flores | 29 | Jacksonville Armada (United States) | Released | Mid-season | | |
| 1 | GK | (Australia) | Mark Birighitti | 23 | Varese (Italy) | Loan | Mid-season | | |
| 4 | DF | (Netherlands) | Kew Jaliens | 36 | | Released | Mid-season | | |
| 6 | DF | (Australia) | Adrian Madaschi | 32 | | Released | Mid-season | | |
| 9 | FW | (Australia) | Joel Griffiths | 35 | | Released | Mid-season | | |
| 14 | MF | (Australia) | Billy Celeski | 29 | | Released | Mid-season | | |
| 23 | DF | (Australia) | David Carney | 31 | | Released | Mid-season | | |
| 7 | FW | (Australia) | Jerónimo Neumann | 28 | | Released | Mid-season | | |

== Technical staff ==
| Position | Name |
|---|---|
| Manager | (England) Phil Stubbins |
| Youth Team Manager | (Australia) James Pascoe |
| Goalkeeping Coach | (Australia) Jess Vanstrattan |
| Strength & Conditioning Coach | (Australia) Mark Jones |
| Physiotherapist | (Australia) Justin Dougherty |

== Statistics ==
=== Squad statistics ===
| N | Pos. | Nat. | Name | Total | | | | | A-League | | | | | FFA Cup |
| N | Pos. | Nat. | Name | Apps | Goals | Yellow card | Second yellow card | Red card | Apps | Goals | Yellow card | Second yellow card | Red card | Apps | Goals | Yellow card | Second yellow card | Red card |
|---|---|---|---|---|---|---|---|---|---|---|---|---|---|---|---|---|---|---|
| 1 | GK | (Australia) | Jess Vanstrattan | 0 | 0 | 0 | 0 | 0 | 0 | 0 | 0 | 0 | 0 | 0 | 0 | 0 | 0 | 0 |
| 2 | DF | (Australia) | Scott Neville | 16 | 2 | 3 | 0 | 0 | 16 | 2 | 3 | 0 | 0 | 0 | 0 | 0 | 0 | 0 |
| 3 | DF | (Australia) | Taylor Regan | 17 | 0 | 4 | 0 | 0 | 16 | 0 | 4 | 0 | 0 | 0+1 | 0 | 0 | 0 | 0 |
| 5 | MF | (Australia) | Ben Kantarovski | 19 | 0 | 3 | 1 | 0 | 18 | 0 | 3 | 1 | 0 | 1 | 0 | 0 | 0 | 0 |
| 7 | MF | (Serbia) | Enver Alivodić | 9 | 2 | 3 | 0 | 0 | 9 | 2 | 3 | 0 | 0 | 0 | 0 | 0 | 0 | 0 |
| 8 | MF | (Australia) | Zenon Caravella | 20 | 0 | 2 | 0 | 0 | 17+3 | 0 | 2 | 0 | 0 | 0 | 0 | 0 | 0 | 0 |
| 10 | FW | (Australia) | Travis Cooper | 2 | 0 | 0 | 0 | 0 | 0+2 | 0 | 0 | 0 | 0 | 0 | 0 | 0 | 0 | 0 |
| 11 | DF | (Australia) | Andrew Hoole | 24 | 1 | 8 | 0 | 0 | 19+5 | 1 | 8 | 0 | 0 | 0 | 0 | 0 | 0 | 0 |
| 12 | DF | (Australia) | Sam Gallagher | 20 | 0 | 1 | 0 | 0 | 13+6 | 0 | 1 | 0 | 0 | 1 | 0 | 0 | 0 | 0 |
| 13 | FW | (Ecuador) | Edson Montaño | 27 | 6 | 3 | 0 | 0 | 23+4 | 6 | 3 | 0 | 0 | 0 | 0 | 0 | 0 | 0 |
| 15 | MF | (Australia) | Josh Barresi | 0 | 0 | 0 | 0 | 0 | 0 | 0 | 0 | 0 | 0 | 0 | 0 | 0 | 0 | 0 |
| 16 | MF | (Australia) | Jacob Pepper | 24 | 0 | 2 | 0 | 0 | 16+7 | 0 | 2 | 0 | 0 | 1 | 0 | 0 | 0 | 0 |
| 17 | FW | (Australia) | James Virgili | 9 | 0 | 3 | 0 | 0 | 5+3 | 0 | 3 | 0 | 0 | 0+1 | 0 | 0 | 0 | 0 |
| 18 | DF | (Australia) | Allan Welsh | 16 | 0 | 2 | 0 | 0 | 11+5 | 0 | 2 | 0 | 0 | 0 | 0 | 0 | 0 | 0 |
| 19 | MF | (Australia) | Mitch Cooper | 16 | 0 | 1 | 0 | 0 | 11+5 | 0 | 1 | 0 | 0 | 0 | 0 | 0 | 0 | 0 |
| 20 | GK | (Australia) | Ben Kennedy | 22 | 0 | 0 | 0 | 0 | 21 | 0 | 0 | 0 | 0 | 1 | 0 | 0 | 0 | 0 |
| 21 | DF | (Australia) | Daniel Mullen | 12 | 0 | 2 | 0 | 0 | 12 | 0 | 2 | 0 | 0 | 0 | 0 | 0 | 0 | 0 |
| 22 | DF | (South Korea) | Lee Ki-je | 12 | 2 | 3 | 0 | 0 | 11+1 | 2 | 3 | 0 | 0 | 0 | 0 | 0 | 0 | 0 |
| 25 | FW | (Australia) | Brandon Lundy | 3 | 0 | 0 | 0 | 0 | 0+2 | 0 | 0 | 0 | 0 | 0+1 | 0 | 0 | 0 | 0 |
| 26 | DF | (Australia) | Nick Cowburn | 10 | 0 | 2 | 0 | 0 | 8+2 | 0 | 2 | 0 | 0 | 0 | 0 | 0 | 0 | 0 |
| 27 | FW | (Australia) | Radovan Pavicevic | 10 | 1 | 2 | 0 | 0 | 1+9 | 1 | 2 | 0 | 0 | 0 | 0 | 0 | 0 | 0 |
| 28 | FW | (Australia) | Braedyn Crowley | 1 | 0 | 0 | 0 | 0 | 0+1 | 0 | 0 | 0 | 0 | 0 | 0 | 0 | 0 | 0 |
| 29 | MF | (Australia) | Michael Kantarovski | 1 | 0 | 0 | 0 | 0 | 0+1 | 0 | 0 | 0 | 0 | 0 | 0 | 0 | 0 | 0 |
| 30 | GK | (Australia) | John Solari | 0 | 0 | 0 | 0 | 0 | 0 | 0 | 0 | 0 | 0 | 0 | 0 | 0 | 0 | 0 |
| 31 | MF | (Australia) | Max Burgess | 5 | 0 | 1 | 0 | 0 | 0+5 | 0 | 1 | 0 | 0 | 0 | 0 | 0 | 0 | 0 |
Players out on loan:
| 1 | GK | (Australia) | Mark Birighitti | 6 | 0 | 0 | 0 | 0 | 6 | 0 | 0 | 0 | 0 | 0 | 0 | 0 | 0 | 0 |
Players no longer at the club:
| 4 | DF | (Netherlands) | Kew Jaliens | 14 | 1 | 6 | 0 | 1 | 12+1 | 1 | 5 | 0 | 1 | 1 | 0 | 1 | 0 | 0 |
| 6 | DF | (Australia) | Adrian Madaschi | 11 | 0 | 4 | 0 | 0 | 10 | 0 | 4 | 0 | 0 | 1 | 0 | 0 | 0 | 0 |
| 7 | FW | (Argentina) | Jerónimo Neumann | 14 | 3 | 3 | 0 | 0 | 4+9 | 3 | 3 | 0 | 0 | 1 | 0 | 0 | 0 | 0 |
| 9 | FW | (Australia) | Joel Griffiths | 16 | 3 | 2 | 0 | 0 | 12+3 | 3 | 2 | 0 | 0 | 1 | 0 | 0 | 0 | 0 |
| 10 | MF | (Argentina) | Marcos Flores | 6 | 1 | 2 | 0 | 0 | 4+2 | 1 | 2 | 0 | 0 | 0 | 0 | 0 | 0 | 0 |
| 11 | DF | (Australia) | Craig Goodwin | 1 | 0 | 0 | 0 | 0 | 0 | 0 | 0 | 0 | 0 | 1 | 0 | 0 | 0 | 0 |
| 14 | MF | (Australia) | Billy Celeski | 4 | 0 | 0 | 0 | 0 | 4 | 0 | 0 | 0 | 0 | 0 | 0 | 0 | 0 | 0 |
| 21 | DF | (Australia) | Sam Gallaway | 5 | 0 | 1 | 0 | 0 | 2+2 | 0 | 1 | 0 | 0 | 1 | 0 | 0 | 0 | 0 |
| 22 | MF | (Northern Ireland) | Jonny Steele | 3 | 0 | 2 | 0 | 0 | 2 | 0 | 1 | 0 | 0 | 1 | 0 | 1 | 0 | 0 |
| 23 | MF | (Australia) | David Carney | 15 | 0 | 3 | 0 | 0 | 14+1 | 0 | 3 | 0 | 0 | 0 | 0 | 0 | 0 | 0 |

- Last updated: 24 April 2015
- Source: au.soccerway.com
- (yellow card) = Number of bookings; (second yellow card) = Number of sending offs after a second yellow card; (red card) = Number of sending offs by a direct red card.

== Pre-season and friendlies ==
| 23 July 2014 | Newcastle Jets (Australia) | 3–1 | (Australia) Newcastle Jets Youth | Weston, Australia |
| 19:00 AEST | Barresi 10', 33'; Oxborrow 58' | Report | Willis (?) | Stadium: Rockwell Automation Park |

| 30 July 2014 | Weston Workers (Australia) | 1–8 | (Australia) Newcastle Jets | Weston, Australia |
| 19:00 AEST | Evans 15' | Report | J. Griffiths 22'; Jaliens 35'; Jerónimo 54', 56', 70', 77' (pen.); Farmer 60' (o.g.); Ward 90' | Stadium: Rockwell Automation Park |

| 13 August 2014 | Newcastle Jets (Australia) | 0–1 | (Italy) Juventus | Carlton, Australia |
| 19:00 AEST | | Report | Giovinco 26' | Stadium: Jubilee Oval; Attendance: 0 (Behind closed doors) |

| 24 August 2014 Townsville Football Cup | Brisbane Roar (Australia) | 4–0 | (Australia) Newcastle Jets | Townsville, Australia |
| 17:00 AEST | Petratos 6'; Henrique 40' (pen.); Miller 75'; Brady 86' | Report | | Stadium: Townsville Sports Reserve |

| 27 August 2014 Townsville Football Cup | Newcastle Jets (Australia) | 2–4 | (Australia) Sydney FC | Townsville, Australia |
| 19:30 AEST | J. Griffiths 45'; Montaño 61'; Jerónimo (red card) 70' | Report | Abbas 34' (pen.), 65' (pen.); Brosque 40'; Gameiro 42' | Stadium: Townsville Sports Reserve; Referee: Alan Milliner |

| 30 August 2014 Townsville Football Cup | Newcastle Jets (Australia) | 3–0 | (Australia) North Queensland All Stars | Townsville, Australia |
| 17:00 AEST | Neville 16'; Goodwin 34'; J. Griffiths 88' | Report | | Stadium: Townsville Sports Reserve; Referee: Alex King |

| 13 September 2014 | Newcastle Jets (Australia) | 2–1 | (New Zealand) Wellington Phoenix | Newcastle, Australia |
| 16:00 AEST | J. Griffiths 22' (pen.); Kantarovski (yellow card) 32' (red card) 51'; Virgili 76' | Report | Brockie 60' | Stadium: Magic Park; Referee: Kris Griffiths-Jones |

| 20 September 2014 | Central Coast Mariners (Australia) | 0–0 | (Australia) Newcastle Jets | Mudgee, Australia |
| 16:00 AEST | | Report | | Stadium: Glen Willow Regional Sporting Stadium; Referee: Steve Lucas |

| 27 September 2014 | Newcastle Jets (Australia) | 2–1 | Australia U-20 | Gosford, Australia |
| | Pepper 18'; Jerónimo 25' | Report | Mauk 89' (pen.) | Stadium: Central Coast Stadium; Attendance: 0 (Behind closed doors) |

== Competitions ==
=== Overall ===
| Competition | Started round | Final position / round | First match | Last match |
|---|---|---|---|---|
| A-League | — | 10th | 11 October 2014 | 24 April 2015 |
| FFA Cup | Round of 32 | Round of 32 | 5 August 2014 | 5 August 2014 |

=== A-League ===
==== League table ====
| Pos | Team | Pld | W | D | L | GF | GA | GD | Pts | Qualification |
|---|---|---|---|---|---|---|---|---|---|---|
| 1 | Melbourne Victory (C) | 27 | 15 | 8 | 4 | 56 | 31 | +25 | 53 | Qualification for 2016 AFC Champions League group stage and Finals series |
| 2 | Sydney FC | 27 | 14 | 8 | 5 | 52 | 35 | +17 | 50 | Qualification for 2016 AFC Champions League group stage and Finals series |
| 3 | Adelaide United | 27 | 14 | 4 | 9 | 47 | 32 | +15 | 46 | Qualification for 2016 AFC Champions League qualifying play-off and Finals series |
| 4 | Wellington Phoenix (Note: Wellington Phoenix cannot qualify for the AFC Champions League as they are not recognised as an AFC club.) | 27 | 14 | 4 | 9 | 45 | 35 | +10 | 46 | Qualification for Finals series |
| 5 | Melbourne City | 27 | 9 | 8 | 10 | 36 | 41 | −5 | 35 | Qualification for Finals series |
| 6 | Brisbane Roar | 27 | 10 | 4 | 13 | 42 | 43 | −1 | 34 | Qualification for Finals series |
| 7 | Perth Glory (Note: Perth Glory disqualified from the Finals series and given a compulsory 7th-place finish due to salary cap violations.) | 27 | 14 | 8 | 5 | 45 | 35 | +10 | 50 | |
| 8 | Central Coast Mariners | 27 | 5 | 8 | 14 | 26 | 50 | −24 | 23 | |
| 9 | Western Sydney Wanderers | 27 | 4 | 6 | 17 | 29 | 44 | −15 | 18 | |
| 10 | Newcastle Jets | 27 | 3 | 8 | 16 | 23 | 55 | −32 | 17 | |

Source: A-League
Rules for classification: 1) points; 2) goal difference; 3) number of goals scored.
(C) Champions

==== Results summary ====
| Overall | | | | | | | | Home | | | | | | Away | | | | | |
| Pld | W | D | L | GF | GA | GD | Pts | W | D | L | GF | GA | GD | W | D | L | GF | GA | GD |
|---|---|---|---|---|---|---|---|---|---|---|---|---|---|---|---|---|---|---|---|
| 27 | 3 | 8 | 16 | 23 | 54 | −31 | 17 | 1 | 4 | 8 | 13 | 27 | −14 | 2 | 4 | 8 | 10 | 27 | −17 |

Last updated: 24 April 2015.
Source: ultimatealeague.com

==== Results by round ====
| Round | 1 | 2 | 3 | 4 | 5 | 6 | 7 | 8 | 9 | 10 | 11 | 12 | 13 | 14 | 15 | 16 | 17 | 18 | 19 | 20 | 21 | 22 | 23 | 24 | 25 | 26 | 27 |
|---|---|---|---|---|---|---|---|---|---|---|---|---|---|---|---|---|---|---|---|---|---|---|---|---|---|---|---|
| Ground | A | A | A | A | H | H | A | H | H | A | H | A | H | A | A | H | H | A | H | H | A | A | H | H | A | H | A |
| Result | L | D | L | L | D | L | D | D | L | L | W | L | L | D | L | L | D | D | D | L | L | W | L | L | W | L | L |
| Position | 9 | 8 | 8 | 8 | 8 | 9 | 9 | 9 | 9 | 9 | 9 | 9 | 9 | 9 | 9 | 9 | 9 | 9 | 9 | 10 | 10 | 9 | 10 | 10 | 9 | 10 | 10 |

Updated to match(es) played on 24 April 2015. Source: ultimatealeague.com
A = Away; H = Home; W = Win; D = Draw; L = Loss

==== Matches ====
| 11 October 2014 1 | Central Coast Mariners | 1–0 | Newcastle Jets | Gosford |
| 17:00 AEDT | Duke 90+2' | Report | | Stadium: Central Coast Stadium; Attendance: 10,443; Referee: Kris Griffiths-Jones |

| 19 October 2014 2 | Melbourne City | 1–1 | Newcastle Jets | Melbourne |
| 15:00 AEDT | Villa 87' | Report | Montaño 62' | Stadium: AAMI Park; Attendance: 15,717; Referee: Jarred Gillett |

| 26 October 2014 3 | Wellington Phoenix | 4–1 | Newcastle Jets | Wellington |
| 17:00 NZDT | Burns 4', 42'; McGlinchey 64'; Durante 90+4' | Report | J. Griffiths 90' | Stadium: Westpac Stadium; Attendance: 7,802; Referee: Chris Beath |

| 1 November 2014 4 | Perth Glory | 2–1 | Newcastle Jets | Perth |
| 16:30 AWST | Maclaren 77', 79' | Report | Jerónimo 74' | Stadium: nib Stadium; Attendance: 8,624; Referee: Ben Williams |

| 8 November 2014 5 | Newcastle Jets | 2–2 | Melbourne Victory | Newcastle |
| 17:00 AEDT | Jaliens 31'; J. Griffiths 33' (pen.) | Report | Ben Khalfallah 36'; Berisha 48' | Stadium: Hunter Stadium; Attendance: 11,884; Referee: Strebre Delovski |

| 14 November 2014 6 | Newcastle Jets | 0–4 | Brisbane Roar | Newcastle |
| 19:40 AEDT | | Report | Henrique 49', 72', 89'; Lustica 66' | Stadium: Hunter Stadium; Attendance: 10,216; Referee: Alan Milliner |

| 22 November 2014 7 | Western Sydney Wanderers | 1–1 | Newcastle Jets | Parramatta |
| 17:00 AEDT | Juric 12' | Report | Flores 27' | Stadium: Pirtek Stadium; Attendance: 14,136; Referee: Peter O'Leary |

| 30 November 2014 8 | Newcastle Jets | 1–1 | Central Coast Mariners | Newcastle |
| 17:00 AEDT | Montaño 48' | Report | Vernes 55' | Stadium: Hunter Stadium; Attendance: 11,031; Referee: Shaun Evans |

| 6 December 2014 9 | Newcastle Jets | 1–3 | Wellington Phoenix | Newcastle |
| 17:00 AEDT | J. Griffiths 24' | Report | Burns 73'; McGlinchey 74'; Krishna 78' | Stadium: Hunter Stadium; Attendance: 9,152; Referee: Adam Fielding |

| 12 December 2014 10 | Perth Glory | 2–0 | Newcastle Jets | Perth |
| 18:45 AWST | Garcia 11'; Marinković 86' | Report | Jaliens (red card) 82' | Stadium: nib Stadium; Attendance: 9,233; Referee: Kris Griffiths-Jones |

| 19 December 2014 11 | Newcastle Jets | 2–1 | Adelaide United | Newcastle |
| 19:40 AEDT | Neville 49'; Jerónimo 81' | Report | Goodwin 69' | Stadium: Hunter Stadium; Attendance: 10,407; Referee: Strebre Delovski |

| 27 December 2014 12 | Melbourne Victory | 1–0 | Newcastle Jets | Melbourne |
| 19:45 AEDT | Finkler 85' | Report | | Stadium: AAMI Park; Attendance: 20,801; Referee: Ben Williams |

| 30 December 2014 13 | Newcastle Jets | 2–5 | Melbourne City | Newcastle |
| 17:00 AEDT | Montaño 71'; Jerónimo 79' | Report | Mooy 4' (pen.); Koren 9', 63', 74'; Duff 24' | Stadium: Hunter Stadium; Attendance: 9,935; Referee: Stephen Lucas |

| 3 January 2015 14 | Sydney FC | 0–0 | Newcastle Jets | Wollongong |
| 19:30 AEDT | | Report | | Stadium: WIN Stadium; Attendance: 11,733; Referee: Lucien Laverdue |

| 24 January 2015 15 | Adelaide United | 7–0 | Newcastle Jets | Adelaide |
| 16:30 ACDT | Djite 2', 53'; Carrusca 23', 28' (pen.); Boogaard 35'; Cirio 69'; Isaías 92' | Report | | Stadium: Coopers Stadium; Attendance: 10,960; Referee: Matthew Conger |

| 6 February 2015 16 | Newcastle Jets | 1–2 | Brisbane Roar | Newcastle |
| 19:40 AEDT | Pavicevic 72' | Report | Solórzano 35'; Welsh 90+3' (o.g.) | Stadium: Hunter Stadium; Attendance: 6,994; Referee: Chris Beath |

| 14 February 2015 17 | Newcastle Jets | 1–1 | Western Sydney Wanderers | Newcastle |
| 17:00 AEDT | Lee 90+2' | Report | Šantalab 86' (pen.) | Stadium: Hunter Stadium; Attendance: 11,019; Referee: Lucien Laverdure |

| 22 February 2015 18 | Wellington Phoenix | 2–2 | Newcastle Jets | Lower Hutt |
| 17:00 NZDT | Krishna 68'; Hicks 90+4' | Report | Bonevacia 12' (o.g.); Neville 18'; B. Kantarovski (yellow card) 21' (yellow-red card) 87' | Stadium: Hutt Recreation Ground; Attendance: 8,437; Referee: Kris Griffiths-Jones |

| 28 February 2015 19 | Newcastle Jets | 0–0 | Central Coast Mariners | Newcastle |
| 17:00 AEDT | | Report | | Stadium: Hunter Stadium; Attendance: 7,991; Referee: Adam Fielding |

| 6 March 2015 20 | Newcastle Jets | 0–1 | Sydney FC | Newcastle |
| 19:40 AEDT | [ Report] | Report | Janko 68' | Stadium: Hunter Stadium; Attendance: 8,783; Referee: Matthew Conger |

| 14 March 2015 21 | Melbourne City | 4–0 | Newcastle Jets | Melbourne |
| 19:30 AEDT | Jaliens 18'; Novillo 47'; Williams 63'; Ramsay 88' | Report | | Stadium: AAMI Park; Attendance: 5,876; Referee: Peter Green |

| 21 March 2015 22 | Western Sydney Wanderers | 1–2 | Newcastle Jets | Parramatta |
| 17:00 AEDT | Kalmar 51' | Report | Alivodić 22'; Lee 44' | Stadium: Pirtek Stadium; Attendance: 10,109; Referee: Strebre Delovski |

| 29 March 2015 23 | Newcastle Jets | 0–1 | Adelaide United | Newcastle |
| 17:00 AEDT | | Report | Carrusca 28' | Stadium: Hunter Stadium; Attendance: 6,888; Referee: Kazuyoshi Enomoto (Japan) |

| 6 April 2015 24 | Newcastle Jets | 0–2 | Perth Glory | Newcastle |
| 17:00 AEST | | Report | Keogh 50'; Marinković 84' | Stadium: Hunter Stadium; Attendance: 4,162; Referee: Peter Green |

| 10 April 2015 25 | Melbourne Victory | 0–1 | Newcastle Jets | Melbourne |
| 19:30 AEST | | Report | Montaño 55' | Stadium: AAMI Park; Attendance: 19,277; Referee: Peter O'Leary |

| 17 April 2015 26 | Newcastle Jets | 3–4 | Sydney FC | Newcastle |
| 19:40 AEST | Alivodić 21'; Montaño 67'; Hoole 76' (pen.) | Report | Brosque 48', 56'; Ibini 52'; Stambolziev 80' | Stadium: Hunter Stadium; Attendance: 8,125; Referee: Peter Green |

| 24 April 2015 27 | Brisbane Roar | 2–1 | Newcastle Jets | Brisbane |
| 19:40 AEST | Danning 71'; Jackson 86' | Report | Montaño 77' | Stadium: Suncorp Stadium; Attendance: 8,693; Referee: Stephen Lucas |

=== FFA Cup ===
| 5 August 2014 Round of 32 | Newcastle Jets | 0–2 | Perth Glory | Newcastle |
| 19:30 AEST | | Report | Keogh 20', 88' | Stadium: Wanderers Oval; Attendance: 2,877; Referee: Kris Griffiths-Jones |

== Awards ==
- Newcastle Jets Player of the Year – Andrew Hoole
- Newcastle Jets Youth Player of the Year – Nick Cowburn
- Ray Baartz Medal – Andrew Hoole
