= 2013–14 Newcastle Jets FC season =

Newcastle Jets
2013–14 season
- Chairman: Ray Baartz
- Manager: Gary van Egmond (until 20 January 2014); Clayton Zane (from 20 January 2014)
- A-League: 7th
- Top goalscorer: Adam Taggart (16)
Home colours	Away colours

The 2013–14 Newcastle Jets FC season is the club's 13th season since its foundation in 2000. The club participated in the A-League for the 9th time.

== Players ==
=== Squad ===
Note: Flags indicate national team as defined under FIFA eligibility rules; some limited exceptions apply. Players may hold more than one non-FIFA nationality.

No.	Pos.	Nation	Player
1	GK	AUS	Mark Birighitti
2	DF	AUS	Scott Neville
3	DF	AUS	Taylor Regan
4	DF	NED	Kew Jaliens
5	MF	AUS	Ben Kantarovski
6	MF	AUS	Zenon Caravella
7	DF	AUS	Andrew Hoole
8	MF	AUS	Ruben Zadkovich (Captain)
9	FW	ENG	Emile Heskey
11	DF	AUS	Craig Goodwin
12	DF	AUS	Connor Chapman
13	FW	AUS	Joey Gibbs
14	DF	AUS	Josh Mitchell
15	MF	AUS	Joshua Brillante

No.	Pos.	Nation	Player
16	MF	AUS	Jacob Pepper
17	MF	AUS	James Virgili
18	MF	AUS	James Brown
19	FW	ENG	Michael Bridges
20	GK	AUS	Ben Kennedy
21	DF	AUS	Sam Gallaway
22	FW	AUS	Adam Taggart
23	MF	AUS	David Carney
24	MF	AUS	Mitchell Oxborrow (Youth)
25	MF	AUS	Mitch Cooper (Youth)
27	MF	AUS	Nick Ward
29	FW	AUS	Joel Griffiths
30	GK	AUS	John Solari (Youth)
––	MF	AUS	Brandon Lundy (Youth)

== Transfers ==
=== Winter ===
==== In ====
Note: Flags indicate national team as defined under FIFA eligibility rules; some limited exceptions apply. Players may hold more than one non-FIFA nationality.

No.	Pos.	Nation	Player
13	MF	AUS	Joey Gibbs (from (Australia) Western Sydney Wanderers)
10	FW	AUS	Nathan Burns (loan from (South Korea) Incheon United)
4	DF	NED	Kew Jaliens (from (Poland) Wisła Kraków)
—	MF	AUS	Brandon Lundy (promoted from (Australia) Newcastle Jets Youth)

==== Out ====
Note: Flags indicate national team as defined under FIFA eligibility rules; some limited exceptions apply. Players may hold more than one non-FIFA nationality.

No.	Pos.	Nation	Player
—	FW	AUS	Marko Jesic (released)
—	DF	SUI	Dominik Ritter (released)
—	MF	BRA	Bernardo Ribeiro (to (Finland) IFK Mariehamn)
—	GK	AUS	Jack Duncan (to (Australia) Perth Glory)

=== Summer ===
==== In ====
Note: Flags indicate national team as defined under FIFA eligibility rules; some limited exceptions apply. Players may hold more than one non-FIFA nationality.

No.	Pos.	Nation	Player
27	MF	AUS	Nick Ward (free agent)
29	FW	AUS	Joel Griffiths (free agent)
—	MF	AUS	David Carney (free agent)

==== Out ====
Note: Flags indicate national team as defined under FIFA eligibility rules; some limited exceptions apply. Players may hold more than one non-FIFA nationality.

No.	Pos.	Nation	Player
10	FW	AUS	Nathan Burns (loan return to (South Korea) Incheon United)

=== Pre-season and friendlies ===
3 July 2013	Lake Macquarie Roosters (Australia)	0–3	(Australia) Newcastle Jets	Speers Point
Wednesday 19:00		Report	Gallaway ?'; Kantarovski ?'; Russell ?'	Stadium: Macquarie Field

25 July 2013	Weston Bears (Australia)	0–3	(Australia) Newcastle Jets	Weston
Thursday 18:30		Report	Virgili 25', 32'; J. Gibbs 55'	Stadium: Rockwell Automation Park

31 July 2013	NBN State League Select (New South Wales)	0–3	(Australia) Newcastle Jets	Newcastle
Wednesday 18:30		Report	Virgili 38', 40'; Bradbery 70' (pen.)	Stadium: Jack McLaughlan Oval

7 August 2013	Mounties Wanderers (Australia)	2–5	(Australia) Newcastle Jets	Sydney
Wednesday 19:00	Severino 44' (pen.); Hirmiz 85'	Report	Lundy 5'; J. Gibbs 48', 54'; Goodwin 76'; McDonald 81'	Stadium: Cook Park; Referee: Strebre Delovski

14 August 2013	Bonnyrigg White Eagles (Australia)	2–2	(Australia) Newcastle Jets	Sydney
Wednesday 18:30	Peterson 50'; Zonjić 89'	Report	Virgili 85', 86'	Stadium: Bonnyrigg Sports Club

21 August 2013	Canberra NPL All-Stars (Australia)	0–3	(Australia) Newcastle Jets	Canberra
Wednesday 19:00		Report	Goodwin 2'; Zadkovich 39'; R. Cooper 63'	Stadium: McKellar Park; Attendance: 761; Referee: Ben Williams

24 August 2013	Newcastle Jets	0–1	Wellington Phoenix	Weston
Saturday 16:30		Report	Sigmund 7'	Stadium: Rockwell Automation Park; Referee: Andrew Best

10 September 2013	Sydney Olympic (Australia)	0–3	(Australia) Newcastle Jets	Sydney
Tuesday 19:00 (Rescheduled)		Report	Burns 13'; Heskey 43'; Bridges 83'	Stadium: Belmore Sports Ground

14 September 2013	Sydney FC	0–1	Newcastle Jets	Wollongong
Saturday 17:30		Report	Virgili 53'	Stadium: WIN Stadium

18 September 2013	Melbourne Victory	0–1	Newcastle Jets	Melbourne
Wednesday 14:00		Report	Virgili 49' (pen.)	Stadium: AAMI Park; Referee: Lucien Laverdure

25 September 2013 Intra-club	Newcastle Jets	3–0	Newcastle Jets B	Newcastle
	Bridges 47' (pen.); Taggart 67'; Virgili 70'	Report		Stadium: Wanderers Oval

29 September 2013	Newcastle Jets	2–1	Central Coast Mariners	Tamworth
Sunday 14:00	Goodwin 19', 23'	Report	Griffiths 65'	Stadium: Scully Park Oval

== Competitions ==
=== Overall ===
Competition	Started round	Current position / round	Final position / round	First match	Last match
A-League	—	7th		11 October 2013	11 April 2014
National Youth League	—	—	Runners-up	26 October 2013	1 March 2014
National Premier League	—	1st		4 April 2014	9 August 2014

=== A-League ===
==== League table ====
Pos	Team	Pld	W	D	L	GF	GA	GD	Pts	Qualification
1	Brisbane Roar (C)	27	16	4	7	43	25	+18	52	Qualificaition for 2015 AFC Champions League group stage and finals series
2	Western Sydney Wanderers	27	11	9	7	34	29	+5	42	Qualificaition for 2015 AFC Champions League group stage and finals series
3	Central Coast Mariners	27	12	6	9	33	36	−3	42	Qualification for 2015 AFC Champions League qualifying play-off and finals series (Note: Since the winner of 2014 A-League Grand Final (Brisbane Roar) qualified for the 2015 AFC Champions League group stage, the 2nd and 3rd placed teams qualified for the group stage and the qualifying play-off of 2015 AFC Champions League.)
4	Melbourne Victory	27	11	8	8	42	43	−1	41	Qualification for Finals series
5	Sydney FC	27	12	3	12	40	38	+2	39	Qualification for Finals series
6	Adelaide United	27	10	8	9	45	36	+9	38	Qualification for Finals series
7	Newcastle Jets	27	10	6	11	34	34	0	36	
8	Perth Glory	27	7	7	13	28	37	−9	28	
9	Wellington Phoenix (Note: Wellington Phoenix cannot qualify for the AFC Champions League as they are not recognised as an AFC club.)	27	7	7	13	36	51	−15	28	
10	Melbourne Heart	27	6	8	13	36	42	−6	26	

Updated to match(es) played on 13 April 2014. Source: ultimatealeague.com
Rules for classification: 1) points; 2) goal difference; 3) number of goals scored.
(C) Champions

==== Results summary ====
Overall								Home						Away					
Pld	W	D	L	GF	GA	GD	Pts	W	D	L	GF	GA	GD	W	D	L	GF	GA	GD
27	10	6	11	34	34	0	36	5	5	4	22	16	+6	5	1	7	12	18	−6

Last updated: 11 April 2014.
Source: ultimatealeague.com

==== Results by round ====
Round	1	2	3	4	5	6	7	8	9	10	11	12	13	14	15	16	17	18	19	20	21	22	23	24	25	26	27
Ground	A	H	A	H	A	H	H	A	A	H	A	A	H	H	A	A	H	H	A	H	A	H	A	H	A	H	H
Result	L	D	D	D	W	W	W	L	W	L	W	L	L	D	L	L	D	L	W	L	W	W	L	W	L	D	W
Position	10	10	10	7	6	3	3	5	3	5	4	5	6	6	7	8	9	9	8	8	8	7	7	6	7	7	7

Updated to match(es) played on 11 April 2014. Source: ultimatealeague.com
A = Away; H = Home; W = Win; D = Draw; L = Loss

==== Matches ====
11 October 2013 1	Sydney FC	2–0	Newcastle Jets	Sydney
Friday 19:30	Del Piero 37'; Chianese 60'	Report		Stadium: Allianz Stadium; Attendance: 20,103; Referee: Jarred Gillett

20 October 2013 2	Newcastle Jets	0–0	Perth Glory	Newcastle
Sunday 15:00		Report		Stadium: Hunter Stadium; Attendance: 12,383; Referee: Shaun Evans

27 October 2013 3	Wellington Phoenix	0–0	Newcastle Jets	Napier
Sunday 15:00		Report		Stadium: McLean Park; Attendance: 9,020; Referee: Adam Kersey

2 November 2013 4	Newcastle Jets	2–2	Central Coast Mariners	Newcastle
Saturday 19:30	Neville 51'; Pasfield 57' (o.g.)	Report	Flores 65' (pen.); Sterjovski 80'	Stadium: Hunter Stadium; Attendance: 13,744; Referee: Kris Griffiths-Jones

9 November 2013 5	Adelaide United	1–2	Newcastle Jets	Adelaide
Saturday 17:30	F. Ferreira 71'; Boogaard (red card) 90'	Report	Jaliens 41'; Taggart 52'	Stadium: Coopers Stadium; Attendance: 10,244; Referee: Strebre Delovski

17 November 2013 6	Newcastle Jets	2–1	Brisbane Roar	Newcastle
Sunday 17:00	Taggart 51', 74'; Jaliens (yellow card) 87' (red card) 87'	Report	Brattan 39'	Stadium: Hunter Stadium; Attendance: 7,692; Referee: Matthew Gillett

24 November 2013 7	Newcastle Jets	3–1	Melbourne Heart	Newcastle
Sunday 17:00	Taggart 38', 55', 62'	Report	Migliorini 58'	Stadium: Hunter Stadium; Attendance: 12,806; Referee: Peter Green

30 November 2013 8	Sydney FC	2–0	Newcastle Jets	Sydney
Saturday 19:30	Chianese 45+1'; Despotović 60'	Report		Stadium: Allianz Stadium; Attendance: 14,803; Referee: Ben Williams

8 December 2013 9	Melbourne Victory	1–2	Newcastle Jets	Melbourne
Sunday 17:00	Troisi 50'	Report	N. Burns 44', 66'	Stadium: AAMI Park; Attendance: 18,113; Referee: Alan Milliner

14 December 2013 10	Newcastle Jets	0–1	Western Sydney Wanderers	Newcastle
Saturday 19:30		Report	Bridge 33'	Stadium: Hunter Stadium; Attendance: 16,634; Referee: Jarred Gillett

20 December 2013 11	Brisbane Roar	0–2	Newcastle Jets	Brisbane
Friday 20:00		Report	Donachie 34' (o.g.); Gibbs 87'	Stadium: Suncorp Stadium; Attendance: 14,848; Referee: Peter Green

29 December 2013 12	Adelaide United	1–0	Newcastle Jets	Adelaide
Sunday 17:99	Djite 26'	Report		Stadium: Coopers Stadium; Attendance: 10,778; Referee: Chris Beath

4 January 2014 13	Newcastle Jets	0–1	Perth Glory	Newcastle
Saturday 17:30		Report	Harold 38'	Stadium: Hunter Stadium; Attendance: 11,966; Referee: Matthew Gillett

10 January 2014 14	Newcastle Jets	1–1	Melbourne Victory	Newcastle
Friday 19:30	Nichols 42' (o.g.)	Report	Nabbout 49'	Stadium: Hunter Stadium; Attendance: 12,270; Referee: Strebre Delovski

17 January 2014 15	Melbourne Heart	3–1	Newcastle Jets	Melbourne
Friday 19:30	Ramsay 44'; Dugandžić 45+1', 68'	Report	Regan 37'	Stadium: AAMI Park; Attendance: 5,046; Referee: Alan Milliner

25 January 2014 16	Central Coast Mariners	3–0	Newcastle Jets	Gosford
Saturday 19:30	Cáceres 13'; McBreen 32'; Simon 45+2'	Report		Stadium: Central Coast Stadium; Attendance: 10,920; Referee: Jarred Gillett

1 February 2014 17	Newcastle Jets	2–2	Western Sydney Wanderers	Newcastle
Saturday 19:30	Taggart 26', 90'; J. Griffiths (red card) 90+4'	Report	Mooy 45'; Beauchamp 65'	Stadium: Hunter Stadium; Attendance: 15,924; Referee: Ben Williams

9 February 2014 18	Newcastle Jets	2–3	Wellington Phoenix	Newcastle
Sunday 17:00	Goodwin 26', 46'	Report	Hernández 21'; Huysegems 33'; Hicks 71'	Stadium: Hunter Stadium; Attendance: 10,406; Referee: Shaun Evans

16 February 2014 19	Brisbane Roar	0–1	Newcastle Jets	Brisbane
Sunday 17:00		Report	Taggart 59' (pen.)	Stadium: Suncorp Stadium; Attendance: 13,066; Referee: Takuto Okabe (Japan)

22 February 2014 20	Newcastle Jets	0–2	Sydney FC	Newcastle
Saturday 17:30		Report	Ognenovski 60'; Del Piero 73' (pen.)	Stadium: Hunter Stadium; Attendance: 12,449; Referee: Strebre Delovski

2 March 2014 21	Western Sydney Wanderers	0–2	Newcastle Jets	Sydney
Sunday 17:00		Report	Jaliens 37'; Taggart 64'	Stadium: Pirtek Stadium; Attendance: 12,079; Referee: Chris Beath

8 March 2014 22	Newcastle Jets	1–0	Melbourne Heart	Newcastle
Saturday 17:30	Taggart 53'	Report		Stadium: Hunter Stadium; Attendance: 10,117; Referee: Adam Kersey

15 March 2014 23	Central Coast Mariners	3–1	Newcastle Jets	Gosford
Saturday 20:00	Bosnar 1'; Ibini 6'; G. Trifiro 88'	Report	J. Griffiths 23'	Stadium: Central Coast Stadium; Attendance: 7,455; Referee: Peter Green

22 March 2014 24	Newcastle Jets	5–0	Wellington Phoenix	Newcastle
Saturday 17:30	Heskey 35'; J. Griffiths 46'; Taggart 57', 77'; Bridges 90+3'	Report		Stadium: Hunter Stadium; Attendance: 9,483; Referee: Strebre Delovski

30 March 2014 25	Perth Glory	2–1	Newcastle Jets	Perth
Sunday 17:00	Marinković 84'; Harold 85'	Report	Taggart 62'	Stadium: nib Stadium; Attendance: 5,837; Referee: Kris Griffiths-Jones

5 April 2014 26	Newcastle Jets	2–2	Melbourne Victory	Newcastle
Saturday 17:30	Taggart 18'; Leijer 22' (o.g.)	Report	Milligan 21', 86' (pen.)	Stadium: Hunter Stadium, Newcastle; Attendance: 10,185; Referee: Strebre Delovski

11 April 2014 27	Newcastle Jets	2–0	Adelaide United	Newcastle
Friday 19:30	J. Griffiths 21'; Taggart 90'			Stadium: Hunter Stadium; Attendance: 11,226; Referee: Peter O'Leary

=== National Youth League ===
==== League table ====
Pos	Team	Pld	W	D	L	GF	GA	GD	Pts
1	Sydney FC Youth (C)	18	13	2	3	49	29	+20	41
2	Newcastle Jets Youth	18	11	4	3	50	29	+21	37
3	Melbourne Victory Youth	18	9	4	5	50	36	+14	31
4	Adelaide United Youth	18	9	3	6	41	36	+5	30
5	Melbourne Heart Youth	18	8	4	6	40	30	+10	28
6	Western Sydney Wanderers Youth	18	7	2	9	37	33	+4	23
7	Brisbane Roar Youth	18	6	5	7	41	45	−4	23
8	AIS Football Program	18	6	3	9	32	47	−15	21
9	Perth Glory Youth	18	5	0	13	35	67	−32	15
10	Central Coast Mariners Academy	18	1	3	14	20	43	−23	6

Source: au.soccerway.com
Rules for classification: 1) points; 2) goal difference; 3) number of goals scored.
(C) Champions

==== Results summary ====
Overall								Home						Away					
Pld	W	D	L	GF	GA	GD	Pts	W	D	L	GF	GA	GD	W	D	L	GF	GA	GD
18	11	4	3	50	29	+21	37	6	2	1	27	17	+10	5	2	2	23	12	+11

Last updated: 2 March 2014.
Source: Competitive Matches

==== Results by round ====
Round	1	2	3	4	5	6	7	8	9	10	11	12	13	14	15	16	17	18
Ground	A	H	A	H	H	A	A	H	A	H	H	A	A	A	H	H	A	H
Result	L	W	L	W	W	W	W	D	D	W	L	D	W	W	W	D	W	W
Position	10	5	7	5	3	2	2	2	2	2	2	3	2	2	2	2	2	2

A = Away; H = Home; W = Win; D = Draw; L = Loss

==== Matches ====
26 October 2013 1	AIS Football Program	2–0	Newcastle Jets Youth	Canberra
15:00 AEDT	Gersbach 24'; Antoniou 72'	Report		Stadium: AIS Grass Fields

3 November 2013 2	Newcastle Jets Youth	2–1	Central Coast Mariners Youth	Newcastle
15:00 AEDT	Pavicevic 7'; Forbes 25' (o.g.)	Report	Curran 19'	Stadium: Wanderers Oval; Attendance: 200; Referee: Trent Nash

10 November 2013 3	Adelaide United Youth	1–0	Newcastle Jets Youth	Adelaide
10:30 ACDT	Cowburn 7' (o.g.)	Report		Stadium: Thebarton Oval; Referee: Rick Schneider

16 November 2013 4	Newcastle Jets Youth	6–1	Perth Glory Youth	Newcastle
10:00 AEDT	Bradbery 10'; Virgili 27', 62'; Waller 57'; Gibbs 81', 86'	Report	Knowles 12'	Stadium: Wanderers Oval

23 November 2013 5	Newcastle Jets Youth	6–3	AIS Football Program	Newcastle
11:00 AEDT	Virgili 14', 17', 73'; Oxborrow 20'; Bradbery 60'; Gibbs 90+3' (pen.)	Report	Smith 12'; Kalik 57', 75'	Stadium: Wanderers Oval

30 November 2013 6	Central Coast Mariners Youth	1–3	Newcastle Jets Youth	Tuggerah
10:30 AEDT	Kwasnik 68'	Report	Bradbery 15'; Pavicevic 35'; Cooper 90+2'	Stadium: Central Coast Mariners Centre of Excellence; Attendance: 150; Referee: Adrian Arndt

8 December 2013 7	Melbourne Victory Youth	1–2	Newcastle Jets Youth	Melbourne
14:30 AEDT	Stella 14'	Report	Gibbs 35'; Virgili 40'	Stadium: AAMI Park; Attendance: 800; Referee: Greg Gontscharow

15 December 2013 8	Newcastle Jets Youth	1–1	Melbourne Heart Youth	Newcastle
10:30 AEDT	82'		39'; (red card) 52'	Stadium: Wanderers Oval

21 December 2013 9	Brisbane Roar Youth	2–2	Newcastle Jets Youth	Brisbane
14:00 AEST	Borrello 57', 61'	Report	Goodwin 45+2'; Cooper 49'	Stadium: Goodwin Park

5 January 2014 10	Newcastle Jets Youth	4–3	Western Sydney Wanderers Youth	Newcastle
15:00 AEDT	Pavicevic 32'; Oxborrow 72'; Bradbery 76', 86'	Report	Olsen 77'; McGing 90'; Symons 90+2'	Stadium: Wanderers Oval

12 January 2014 11	Newcastle Jets Youth	0–3	Sydney FC Youth	Newcastle
15:00 AEDT		Report	Calver 60'; Urosevski 86'; Mallia 90+2'	Stadium: Wanderers Oval

18 January 2014 12	Melbourne Heart Youth	0–0	Newcastle Jets Youth	Melbourne
15:00 AEDT		Report		Stadium: Epping Stadium; Attendance: 200; Referee: Harley Natis

25 January 2014 13	Perth Glory Youth	2–6	Newcastle Jets Youth	Perth
10:30 AWST	Makeche 12', 41'	Report	Bradbery 8', 31', 62'; Oxborrow 26'; Pavicevic 47'; Virgili 54'; Whiteside (yellow card) 61' (red card) 90+4'	Stadium: Intiga Stadium

2 February 2014 14	Western Sydney Wanderers Youth	2–3	Newcastle Jets Youth	Sydney
18:00 AEDT	Hanna 17'; Fofanah 54'	Report	Virgili 32', 62'; Brown (red card) 49'; Cowburn 77'	Stadium: Campbelltown Stadium

8 February 2014 15	Newcastle Jets Youth	4–2	Adelaide United Youth	Newcastle
19:00 AEDT	Pavicevic 54', 80'; Bradbery 57'; Cowburn 87'	Report	Costa 9'; Milesunic 61'	Stadium: Wanderers Oval

15 February 2014 16	Newcastle Jets Youth	2–2	Melbourne Victory Youth	Newcastle
10:30 AEDT	Pavicevic 13'; Bradbery 45+1'	Report	Proia 49', 80'	Stadium: Wanderers Oval

23 February 2014 17	Sydney FC Youth	1–7	Newcastle Jets Youth	Wollongong
15:00 AEDT	Tratt (red card) 38'; Urosevski 82'	Report	Pavicevic 6', 51'; Brown 42', 83', 90+1'; Gibbs 45', 68'	Stadium: WIN Stadium

1 March 2014 18	Newcastle Jets Youth	2–1	Brisbane Roar Youth	Newcastle
16:00 AEDT	Bradbery 33' (pen.); Chapman 75'	Report	Ingham 45'	Stadium: Wanderers Oval

==== League Goalscorers per Round ====
Total	Player		Goals per Round																	
Total	Player		1	2	3	4	5	6	7	8	9	10	11	12	13	14	15	16	17	18
11	(Australia)	Kale Bradbery				1	1	1				2			3		1	1		1
9	(Australia)	James Virgili				2	3		1						1	2				
9	(Australia)	Radovan Pavicevic		1				1				1			1		2	1	2	
6	(Australia)	Joey Gibbs				2	1		1										2	
3	(Australia)	Mitchell Oxborrow					1					1			1					
3	(Australia)	James Brown																	3	
2	(Australia)	Mitch Cooper						1			1									
2	(Australia)	Nick Cowburn														1	1			
1	(Australia)	Tom Waller				1														
1	(Australia)	Craig Goodwin									1									
1	(Australia)	Connor Chapman																		1
1	–	Own goal		1																
50	TOTAL		0	2	0	6	6	3	2	1	2	4	0	0	6	3	4	2	7	2

=== National Premier League ===
==== Results summary ====
Overall								Home						Away					
Pld	W	D	L	GF	GA	GD	Pts	W	D	L	GF	GA	GD	W	D	L	GF	GA	GD
10	6	2	2	26	13	+13	20	3	1	0	14	6	+8	3	1	2	12	7	+5

Last updated: 17 June 2014.
Source: Competitive Matches

==== Results by round ====
Round	1	2	3	4	5	6	7	8	9	10	11	12	13	14	15	16	17	18
Ground	A	H	A	A	H	A	H	A	H	H	A	H	H	A	H	A	H	A
Result	L	W	W	W	W	D	W	L	D		W							
Position	10	6	4	2	1	1	1	2	1		1							

Updated to match(es) played on 17 June 2014. Source: Matches
A = Away; H = Home; W = Win; D = Draw; L = Loss

==== Matches ====
4 April 2014 1	Edgeworth Eagles	2–0	Newcastle Jets Youth	Edgeworth
19:00 AEDT	Taylor ?'; Abbott-Hammel ?'	Summary		Stadium: Jack McLaughlan Oval

12 April 2014 2	Newcastle Jets Youth	5–1	Adamstown Rosebud	Adamstown
14:45 AEST	Mcdonald ?'; Pavicevic ?'; Whiteside ?'; M. Kantarovski ?'; Finlayson ?'	Summary	Bale 45'	Stadium: Adamstown Oval

19 April 2014 3	Broadmeadow Magic	0–1	Newcastle Jets Youth	Broadmeadow
14:45 AEST		Summary	Lundy ?'	Stadium: Wanderers Oval

27 April 2014 4	South Cardiff	1–4	Newcastle Jets Youth	Cardiff South
14:45 AEST	Byrnes ?'	Summary	Lundy ?'; Cowburn ?'; Hay ?'; Pavicevic ?'	Stadium: Ulinga Ova

3 May 2014 5	Newcastle Jets Youth	3–2	Charlestown City Blues	Whitebridge
14:45 AEST	Finlayson 20'; Cowburn ?'; Pavicevic 80'	Summary; Report	Smith 30'; Ross 46'	Stadium: Lisle Carr Oval

10 May 2014 6	Lake Macquarie City	2–2	Newcastle Jets Youth	Boolaroo
14:45 AEST	T. Walker 44'; S. Walker 61'	Summary; Report	Hay 19'; Mcdonald 55'	Stadium: Macquarie Field

17 May 2014 7	Newcastle Jets Youth	5–2	Weston Workers	Weston
14:45 AEST	Pavicevic ?'; Papas ?'; Waller ?'; Lundy ?'; McDonald ?'	Summary; Report	Subat ?'; McDermott ?'	Stadium: Rockwell Automation Park

24 May 2014 8	Lambton Jaffas	2–0	Newcastle Jets Youth	New Lambton
14:45 AEST	Majurovski 52'; Smart 80'	Summary; Report		Stadium: Arthur Edden Oval

31 May 2014 9	Newcastle Jets Youth	1–1	Hamilton Olympic	Hamilton
14:45 AEST	Pavicevic 16'	Summary	Swan 75'	Stadium: Darling Street Oval

19 June 2014; Rescheduled 10	Newcastle Jets Youth	v	Edgeworth Eagles	Edgeworth
		Summary		Stadium: Jack McLaughlan Oval

14 June 2014 11	Adamstown Rosebud	0–5	Newcastle Jets Youth	Adamstown
14:45 AEST		Summary		Stadium: Adamstown Oval

28 June 2014 12	Newcastle Jets Youth	v	Broadmeadow Magic	Broadmeadow
14:45 AEST		Summary		Stadium: Wanderers Oval

5 July 2014 13	Newcastle Jets Youth	v	South Cardiff	Cardiff South
14:45 AEST		Summary		Stadium: Ulinga Oval

12 July 2014 14	Charlestown City Blues	v	Newcastle Jets Youth	Whitebridge
14:45 AEST		Summary		Stadium: Lisle Carr Oval

19 July 2014 15	Newcastle Jets Youth	v	Lake Macquarie City	Boolaroo
14:45 AEST		Summary		Stadium: Macquarie Field

26 July 2014 16	Hamilton Olympic	v	Newcastle Jets Youth	Hamilton
14:45 AEST		Summary		Stadium: Darling Street Oval

2 August 2014 17	Newcastle Jets Youth	v	Lambton Jaffas	New Lambton
14:45 AEST		Summary		Stadium: Arthur Edden Oval

9 August 2014 18	Weston Workers	v	Newcastle Jets Youth	Weston
14:45 AEST		Summary		Stadium: Rockwell Automation Park

==== League Goalscorers per Round ====
Total	Player		Goals per Round																					
Total	Player		1	2	3	4	5	6	7	8	9	10	11	12	13	14	15	16	17	18	19	20	21	22
5	(Australia)	Radovan Pavicevic		1		1	1		1		1													
3	(Australia)	Brandon Lundy			1	1			1															
3	(Australia)	Beaudon McDonald		1				1	1															
2	(Australia)	Michael Finlayson		1			1																	
2	(Australia)	Nick Cowburn				1	1																	
2	(Australia)	Benjamin Hay				1		1																
1	(Australia)	Tom Whiteside		1																				
1	(Australia)	Michael Kantarovski		1																				
1	(Australia)	Reece Papas							1															
1	(Australia)	Tom Waller							1															
26	TOTAL		0	5	1	4	3	2	5	0	1	5	–	–	–	–	–	–	–	–	–	–	–	–

== Squad statistics ==
=== League Goalscorers per Round ===
Total	Player		Goals per Round																										
Total	Player		1	2	3	4	5	6	7	8	9	10	11	12	13	14	15	16	17	18	19	20	21	22	23	24	25	26	27
16	(Australia)	Adam Taggart					1	2	3										2		1		1	1		2	1	1	1
4	–	Own goal				1							1			1												1	
3	(Australia)	Joel Griffiths																							1	1			1
2	(Australia)	Nathan Burns									2																		
2	(Australia)	Craig Goodwin																		2									
2	(Netherlands)	Kew Jaliens					1																1						
1	(Australia)	Scott Neville				1																							
1	(Australia)	Joey Gibbs											1																
1	(Australia)	Taylor Regan															1												
1	(England)	Emile Heskey																								1			
1	(England)	Michael Bridges																								1			
34	TOTAL		0	0	0	2	2	2	3	0	2	0	2	0	0	1	1	0	2	2	1	0	2	1	1	5	1	2	2

=== Disciplinary record ===
N	Pos.	Nat.	Name	Yellow card	Second yellow card	Red card	Notes
1	GK	(Australia)	Mark Birighitti	3	0	0	
2	DF	(Australia)	Scott Neville	1	0	0	
3	DF	(Australia)	Taylor Regan	3	0	0	
4	DF	(Netherlands)	Kew Jaliens	8	1	0	
5	MF	(Australia)	Ben Kantarovski	6	0	0	
6	MF	(Australia)	Zenon Caravella	3	0	0	
7	DF	(Australia)	Andrew Hoole	5	0	0	
8	MF	(Australia)	Ruben Zadkovich	5	0	0	
9	FW	(England)	Emile Heskey	1	0	0	
10	FW	(Australia)	Nathan Burns	1	0	0	
11	DF	(Australia)	Craig Goodwin	1	0	0	
12	DF	(Australia)	Connor Chapman	2	0	0	
13	FW	(Australia)	Joey Gibbs	0	0	0	
14	DF	(Australia)	Josh Mitchell	4	0	0	
15	MF	(Australia)	Joshua Brillante	1	0	0	
16	MF	(Australia)	Jacob Pepper	1	0	0	
17	MF	(Australia)	James Virgili	1	0	0	
18	MF	(Australia)	James Brown	3	0	0	
19	FW	(England)	Michael Bridges	0	0	0	
20	GK	(Australia)	Ben Kennedy	0	0	0	
21	DF	(Australia)	Sam Gallaway	3	0	0	
22	FW	(Australia)	Adam Taggart	2	0	0	
23	MF	(Australia)	David Carney	1	0	0	
24	MF	(Australia)	Mitchell Oxborrow	1	0	0	
25	MF	(Australia)	Mitch Cooper	0	0	0	
27	MF	(Australia)	Nick Ward	0	0	0	
29	FW	(Australia)	Joel Griffiths	1	0	1	
30	GK	(Australia)	John Solari	0	0	0	
	MF	(Australia)	Brandon Lundy	0	0	0	

Last updated: 16 March 2014
Source: Competitive matches
Only competitive matches
(yellow card) = Number of bookings; (second yellow card) = Number of sending offs after a second yellow card; (red card) = Number of sending offs by a direct red card.

== Awards ==
- Male U20 Footballer of the Year – Joshua Brillante
- Player of the Week (Round 6) – Adam Taggart
- Player of the Week (Round 7) – Adam Taggart
- NAB Young Footballer of the Month (November) – Adam Taggart
- NAB Young Footballer of the Month (February) – Joshua Brillante
