= Ben Kantarovski =

Australian soccer player

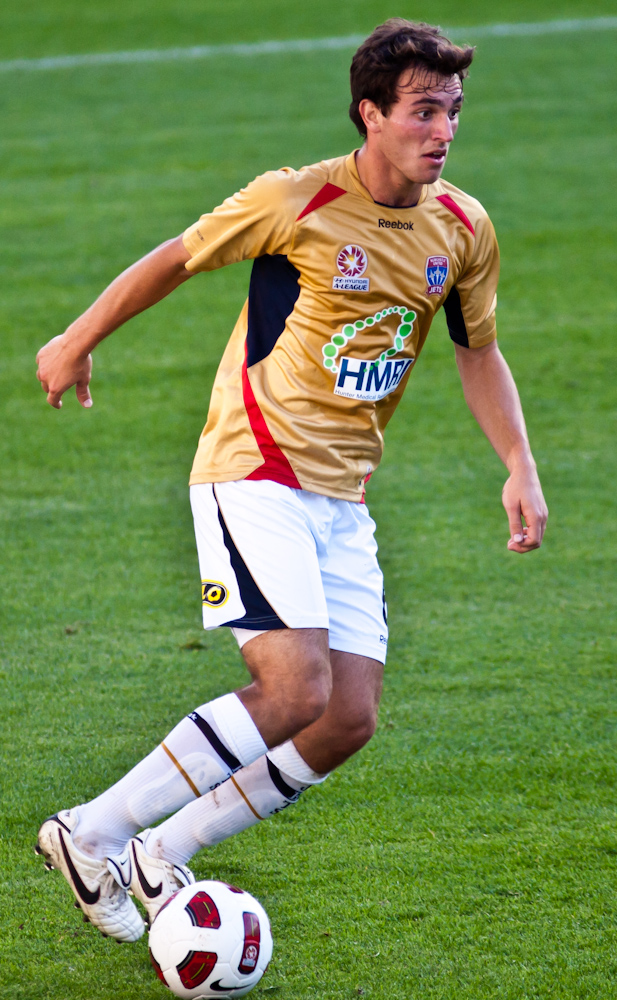
- Kantarovski playing for Newcastle Jets in 2010

Personal information
- Full name: Benjamin Kantarovski
- Date of birth: 20 January 1992 (age 34)
- Place of birth: Newcastle, Australia
- Height: 1.83 m (6 ft 0 in)
- Position: Central midfielder

Youth career
- 2004–2006: Broadmeadow Magic
- 2006–2007: NSWIS

Senior career*
Years	Team	Apps	(Gls)
2008–2022	Newcastle Jets	196	(9)
Total		196	(9)

International career^{‡}
2007–2008	Australia U17	12	(3)
2008–2011	Australia U20	25	(2)
2012	Australia U23	4	(0)
Medal record
Representing Australia
Men's Association football
AFC U-20 Asian Cup
Runner-up	2010 China
- * Club domestic league appearances and goals as of 09:21, 16 November 2019 (UTC) ‡ National team caps and goals as of 18 November 2014

Benjamin Kantarovski (Macedonian: Бенјамин Кантаровски) (born 20 January 1992) is a former Australian professional soccer player who played for the Newcastle Jets as a midfielder. Ben is the older brother of former Newcastle Jets FC player Michael Kantarovski.

== Club career ==
=== Newcastle Jets ===
Kantarovski was signed to a four-year contract by the Newcastle Jets in January 2008 while attending Lambton High School at only 15 years of age, making him the youngest player in A-League history to sign a full-time A-League contract, and one of the youngest players in world football to do so. He made his A-League debut in Round 1 of the 2008–09 season against the Central Coast Mariners playing as a defender. He was only 16 years and 208 days old making him at the time, the youngest player in A-League history. Kantarovski has since played in many different positions for the Newcastle Jets, including all positions across the defence, and all positions across the midfield, most commonly his preferred holding midfielder role. Kantarovski was named the Newcastle Jets Player of the Season in his debut year, despite only playing a handful of games.

Kantarovski attracted the interest of one of the powerhouses of German powerhouse Bayern Munich. Kantarovski spent a week trialling with the Bundesliga club in April, 2009. At the conclusion of this trial, it appeared Bayern's interest in Kantarovski only grew, making it increasingly likely that Kantarovski would depart the A-League for Bayern once he reached the age of 18, FIFA's minimum age for a football player to play for a foreign club. After turning 18, Kantarovski opted to turn down an offer to join Bayern Munich's youth system. He did so after receiving the Kimon Taliadoros scholarship for his educational achievements.

On 12 November 2010, Kantarovski signed a 3-year contract extension keeping him at the Jets until the end of 2013. He scored his first goal for the club with a header against Brisbane Roar in a 1–1 at EnergyAustralia Stadium on 17 November 2010.

Although Kantarovski was contracted at the Jets undtil June 2022, Kantarovski did not feature for the Jets in the A-league after the 2019/2020 season due to ongoing injury. During this extended injury period, Kantarovski studied a Bachelor of Psychology at Newcastle University.

== International career ==
Kantarovski has represented Australia's under-17 team on 12 occasions, scoring 3 times. In 2009, he represented the under-20 team at the Under-20 World Cup as the youngest player in the squad, being a mere 17 years of age, starting in all of their group games, playing as a midfielder in the first game, before being shifted in to the heart of defence. Despite suffering from a knee injury that would eventually sideline him for 6 months, Kantarovski played for Young Socceroos throughout their World Cup campaign, and was a clear standout, named by many as the Socceroo's top player.

Kantarovski was called up by Socceroos coach Pim Verbeek into the Socceroos squad to play Kuwait in the AFC Asian Cup qualifying game against Kuwait, as well as inviting Ben to a training camp with the Socceroos squad.

Kantarovski was selected by Young Socceroos coach Jan Verslejen to captain the Young Socceroos despite being one of the youngest players in the squad. Verslejen cited Kantarovski's A-League and AFC Champions League experience, as well as being a member of the Young Socceroos Under-20 World Cup campaign as three big reasons for his appointment as captain. He also captained the Young Socceroos to victory in the 2010 Asean Football Federation Under-19 Championship, after their 1–0 win in the final against Thailand.

On 27 January 2012 he was selected to play for the Australia Olympic football team against Uzbekistan national under-23 football team and United Arab Emirates national under-23 football team. Kantarovski made his debut for the Australia Olympic football team in the London 2012 Olympic Qualifier against the United Arab Emirates at the Mohammed Bin Zayed Stadium on 22 February 2012.

== Career statistics ==
As of match played 10 November 2021

Appearances and goals by club, season and competition
Club	Season	League^{1}			Cup		Asia^{2}		Total	
Club	Season	Division	Apps	Goals	Apps	Goals	Apps	Goals	Apps	Goals
Newcastle Jets	2008–09	A-League	13	0	1	0	6	0	20	0
Newcastle Jets	2009–10	A-League	16	0	—		—		16	0
Newcastle Jets	2010–11	A-League	15	1	—		—		15	1
Newcastle Jets	2011–12	A-League	22	0	—		—		22	0
Newcastle Jets	2012–13	A-League	4	0	—		—		4	0
Newcastle Jets	2013–14	A-League	18	0	—		—		18	0
Newcastle Jets	2014–15	A-League	18	0	1	0	—		19	0
Newcastle Jets	2015–16	A-League	22	2	1	0	—		23	2
Newcastle Jets	2016–17	A-League	12	0	1	0	—		13	0
Newcastle Jets	2017–18	A-League	22	5	1	0	—		23	5
Newcastle Jets	2018–19	A-League	18	1	1	0	2	0	21	1
Newcastle Jets	2019–20	A-League	16	0	0	0	—		16	0
Newcastle Jets	2020–21	A-League	0	0	—		—		0	0
Newcastle Jets	2021–22	A-League	0	0	0	0	—		0	0
Total			196	9	6	0	8	0	210	9

^{1} - includes A-League final series statistics
^{2} - AFC Champions League statistics are included in season ending during group stages (i.e. ACL 2009 and A-League season 2008–09 etc.)

== Honours ==
=== Player ===
Australia U-20

- AFC U-20 Asian Cup: runner-up 2010
- AFF U-19 Youth Championship: 2010

Australia U-17

- AFF U-16 Youth Championship: 2008

=== Individual ===
- Newcastle Jets Player of the Year: 2008-2009
