= Sam Gallagher (soccer, born 1991) =

Australian soccer player

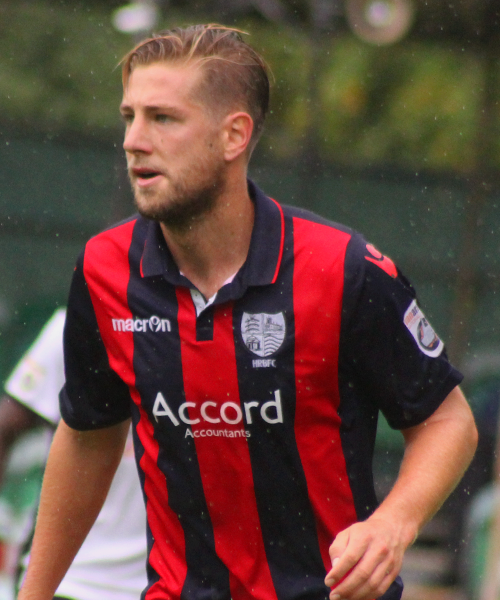
- Gallagher with Hampton & Richmond Borough in 2017

Personal information
- Full name: Sam Justin Gallagher
- Date of birth: 5 May 1991 (age 35)
- Place of birth: Sydney, Australia
- Height: 1.83 m (6 ft 0 in)
- Positions: Centre back; left back

Youth career
- 2006: Gladesville Spirit
- 2007–2008: NSWIS
- 2009: Manly United
- 2009–2010: Sydney FC

Senior career*
| Years | Team | Apps | (Gls) |
| 2010–2012 | Central Coast Mariners | 1 | (0) |
| 2012–2013 | Melbourne Victory | 2 | (0) |
| 2013 | Richmond | 15 | (0) |
| 2013–2014 | IF Birkebeineren | 6 | (0) |
| 2014 | Hà Nội T&T F.C. | 9 | (2) |
| 2014–2015 | Newcastle Jets | 19 | (0) |
| 2015–2017 | Manly United | 32 | (5) |
| 2017 | Hampton & Richmond Borough | 11 | (0) |
| 2017–2018 | Metropolitan Police | 8 | (0) |
| 2019–2021 | Manly United | 49 | (2) |

International career^{‡}
| 2009–2011 | Australia U-20 | 18 | (1) |
| 2011 | Australia U-23 | 1 | (0) |
Medal record
Representing Australia
Men's Association football
AFC U-20 Asian Cup
| Runner-up | 2010 China |
- * Club domestic league appearances and goals as of 9 November 2021 ‡ National team caps and goals as of 14 June 2011

Sam Justin Gallagher (born 5 May 1991) is an Australian footballer who last played as a central defender for Manly United.

== Club career ==
=== Australia ===
Gallagher was born in Sydney, New South Wales. A product of Epping Boys High School, Gallagher spent his junior career at Gladesville Spirit, the NSW Institute of Sport and Manly United FC before being signed for the Sydney FC National Youth League team.

He was called into the senior Sydney FC team on 8 January 2010, as an injury replacement player for Matthew Jurman, who was ruled out for the rest of the season with an injury.

On 19 March 2010, it was announced that Gallagher had signed a senior contract with the Central Coast Mariners starting from the 2010–11 season. He eventually left the club in 2012, having made just 1 of a possible 61 appearances for the club.

Gallagher will start the 2012–13 season at the Melbourne Victory, having signed a pre-contract with the A-League club in March. His debut with the Victory ended almost as soon as it began; in just the 16th minute of the Victory's Round 8 clash with the Western Sydney Wanderers at Parramatta Stadium, Gallagher was controversially sent off for bringing down Wanderers striker Dino Kresinger just outside the penalty area, denying the Croatian what was deemed an obvious goalscoring opportunity. This came despite the fact that Kresinger had clearly fouled Gallagher prior to Gallagher bringing him down. As a result of that red card, Gallagher was handed a one match ban, ruling him out of the Victory's clash with Perth Glory.

Gallagher made his second and final appearance with the Victory in their Round 10 clash with Adelaide United. Gallagher was handed a yellow card in the 79th minute of the match, a match which the Victory eventually lost 4–2.

Gallagher, along with teammates Diogo Ferreira, Spase Dilevski and Tando Velaphi were released by Melbourne Victory in April 2013, shortly after the end of the 2012–13 A-League season. He left the club, having played just 2 games out of a possible 29 in his lone season with the club.

=== Vietnam ===
On 7 January 2014, after a successful trial period, Sam Gallagher signed with V-League Champions Hanoi T&T on a 1-year contract. He will play for Hanoi T&T in the 2014 V League and AFC Cup. The deal makes Sam the first Australian to play in both the Australian A-League and the Vietnamese V-League. He is hoped to be the replacement for Cristiano Roland, T&T's former captain and defender who retired after 2013 season. Gallagher said he knew about the pressure and hoped to do well replacing Cristiano.

Gallagher made his debut on 11 January when he came from the bench in the match against Becamex Bình Dương, which T&T won 4–2. He played about 60 minutes and did well enough to earn the belief from club manager Phan Thanh Hùng. He got chosen to the starting XI for the first time a week later in V-League second round against Hoàng Anh Gia Lai F.C. and continued to do well. He got his second full-start against Vissai Ninh Bình F.C. on 22 January and scored an own-goal as T&T lost 1–3 in Hàng Đẫy.

Four days after, Gallagher made his debut in the AFC Champions League as T&T played the first-round qualifier against Pune F.C. of India and scored a goal – his first goal ever for the Hanoian club.

=== Return to Australia ===
Gallagher returned to Australia, and signed with the Newcastle Jets for the 2014–15 A-League season. After a tumultuous season in which the Jets finished last on the ladder, Gallagher was one of several players released from the club at the end of the season.

After being axed by Newcastle, Gallagher was picked up by Manly United halfway through the NSW NPL 1 season, making his debut in a heavy 4–0 defeat to Rockdale City Suns. He scored his first goal for the club a few games later in a 4–1 win over Marconi Stallions.

Gallagher signed for English National League South club Hampton & Richmond Borough in February 2017 making his debut for the club in a Middlesex Senior Cup match against Hanworth Villa. In August 2017 he joined Metropolitan Police on a dual registration with Hampton.

== International career ==
Gallagher has represented Australia at the Under 19 and Under 20 levels, playing in the 2010 AFC U-19 Championship qualification and 2009 FIFA U-20 World Cup. He made his Under 23 debut for the Olyroos against Singapore, coming on as a substitute in a 6–0 friendly win.

== Honours ==
Sydney FC

- A-League Championship: 2009–10
- A-League Premiership: 2009–10

Central Coast Mariners

- A-League Premiership: 2011–12

Australia U-20

- AFC U-20 Asian Cup: runner-up 2010
- AFF U-19 Youth Championship: 2010

Hà Nội T&T

- Vietnam Super Cup runners-up: 2014
