= Kew Jaliens =

Dutch footballer (born 1978)

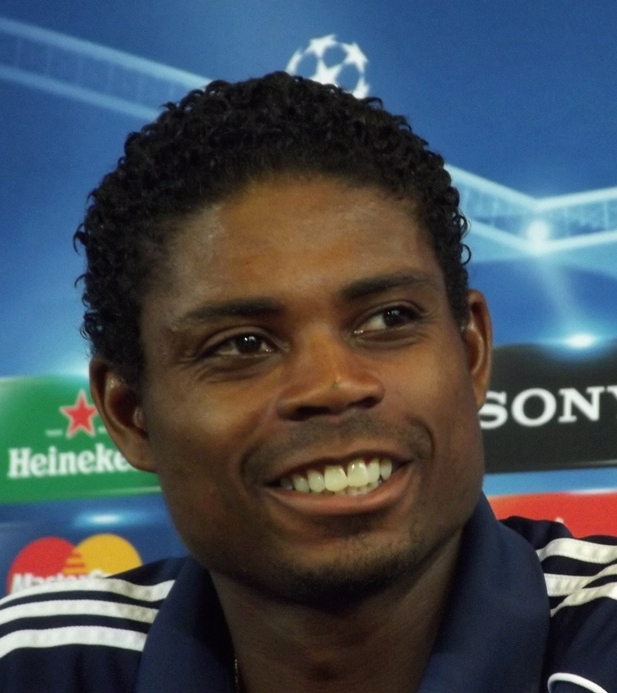
- Jaliens in 2011

Personal information
- Full name: Kew Raffique Jaliens
- Date of birth: 15 September 1978 (age 48)
- Place of birth: Rotterdam, Netherlands
- Height: 1.83 m (6 ft 0 in)
- Position: Defender

Youth career
- Sagu Boys
- Capelle
- DCV

Senior career*
Years	Team	Apps	(Gls)
1997–1999	Sparta	68	(4)
1999–2004	Willem II	147	(4)
2004–2011	AZ	166	(5)
2011–2013	Wisła Kraków	46	(1)
2013–2015	Newcastle Jets	36	(3)
2015	Melbourne City	11	(1)
2018	Weston Workers Bears	6	(0)
Total		480	(18)

International career
1998–1999	Netherlands U-21	11	(0)
2008	Netherlands Olympic (O.P.)	3	(0)
2006–2007	Netherlands	15	(1)

Managerial career
- 2016–2025: Weston Workers Bears FC
- 2021–2022: Newcastle Jets FC Youth (assistant)
- 2026–: Tuvalu (assistant)
- * Club domestic league appearances and goals

Kew Raffique Jaliens (born 15 September 1978) is a Dutch former professional footballer who played as a defender. As of 2026, he is an assistant for the Tuvalu national team under Robert Maaskant.

== Club career ==
=== Sparta ===
Kew Jaliens started his career at Sparta and made his league debut aged 18 in a 2–1 away win over FC Groningen on 25 May 1997. In the following 1997–98 season, Jaliens became a regular in the starting lineup. He finished his career at Sparta with 68 league appearances scoring 4 goals.

=== Willem II ===
Jaliens signed for Willem II in 1999 and made his league debut on 28 August in a match against FC Den Bosch. He scored his first goal on 3 February 2001 in a match against FC Twente Enschede.

=== AZ ===
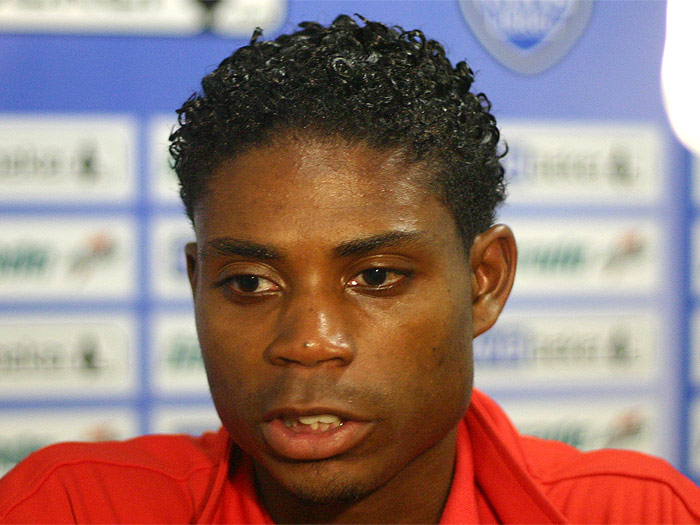
Kew Jaliens in 2007.

In 2004 Jaliens signed for AZ and made his league debut in a 1–1 draw with SC Heerenveen on 14 August. He scored his first goal for AZ on 16 March 2005 in a match against Vitesse Arnhem. In July 2007 he signed a contract extension to 2012, with AZ director of football Marcel Brands, who described him as a "cornerstone of the team". Jaliens took a part in winning the Eredivisie and Dutch Super Cup in 2009.

=== Wisła Kraków ===
On 26 January 2011, Jaliens joined Polish Ekstraklasa side Wisła Kraków on a free transfer from AZ. He signed a two-and-a-half-year deal. Jaliens won the Ekstraklasa championship in his debut season.

=== Newcastle Jets ===
On 15 August 2013, it was announced that Jaliens had signed with Australian club Newcastle Jets.

On 4 August 2014, Jaliens was named as captain of the Newcastle Jets for the upcoming 2014–15 season.

Jaliens was reportedly sacked from the Jets by owner Nathan Tinkler following a player revolt midway through the 2014–15 A-League season.

=== Melbourne City ===
Barely two weeks after his departure from Newcastle, Jaliens joined A-League rival Melbourne City on an injury replacement short-term contract. Subsequently, Jaliens netted one of the winning goals in his first appearance against his former club, Newcastle Jets.

== International career ==
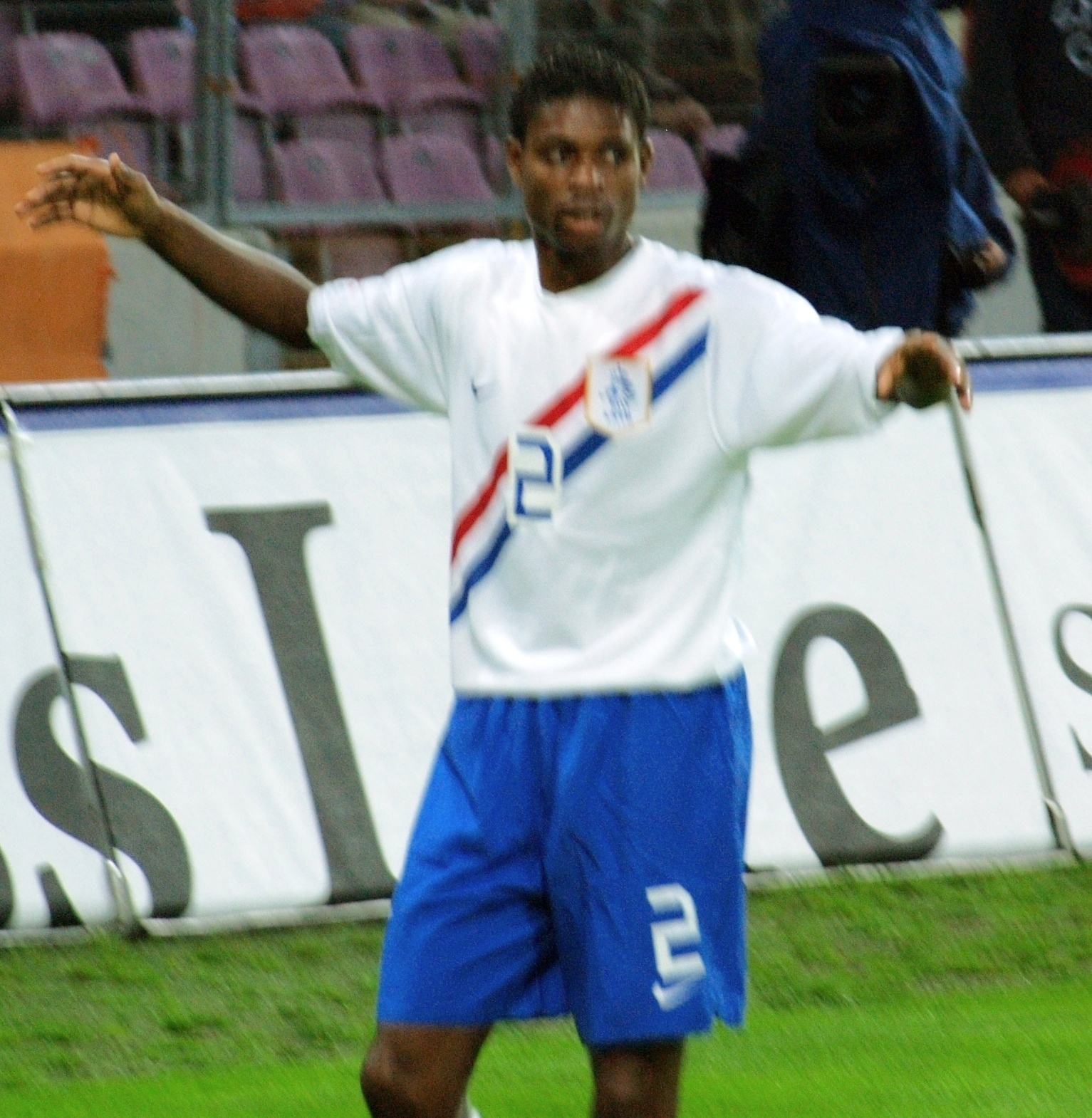
Jaliens playing for the Netherlands

In 2006 Jaliens received a call-up from Marco van Basten and made his debut for the senior side against Ecuador.

He was selected for the 23-man Netherlands squad for the 2006 FIFA World Cup that were held in Germany. Jaliens played one game in the tournament against Argentina which Netherlands kept a clean sheet.

Jaliens has represented the Netherlands 10 times.

=== Beijing Olympics ===
Jaliens was selected as one of the three over aged players in the Netherlands football team at the 2008 Summer Olympics in Beijing. Jaliens played in all three group stage games in the tournament against United States, Japan and Nigeria, but missed the quarterfinal loss against Argentina due to yellow cards ban.

== Personal life ==
He was born on 15 September 1978 to Imro and Carmen Jaliens. He is the nephew of Kenneth Jaliens, the technical director of the Surinamese national team.

== Career statistics ==
As of 2 November 2014

Appearances and goals by club, season and competition
Club	Season	League			Cup		Continental		Other		Total	
Club	Season	Division	Apps	Goals	Apps	Goals	Apps	Goals	Apps	Goals	Apps	Goals
Sparta Rotterdam	1996–97	Eredivisie	2	0	–		–		–		2	0
Sparta Rotterdam	1997–98	Eredivisie	32	3	1	0	–		–		33	3
Sparta Rotterdam	1998–99	Eredivisie	32	0	4	1	–		4	0	40	1
Sparta Rotterdam	1999–2000	Eredivisie	2	1	2	0	–		–		4	1
Sparta Rotterdam	Total		68	4	7	1	–		4	0	79	5
Willem II	1999–2000	Eredivisie	22	0	1	0	5	0	–		28	0
Willem II	2000–01	Eredivisie	31	2	2	0	–		–		33	2
Willem II	2001–02	Eredivisie	29	0	3	0	–		–		32	0
Willem II	2002–03	Eredivisie	32	1	2	1	5	1	–		39	3
Willem II	2003–04	Eredivisie	33	1	4	0	2	0	–		39	1
Willem II	Total		147	4	12	1	12	1	–		171	6
AZ Alkmaar	2004–05	Eredivisie	22	1	0	0	9	1	–		31	2
AZ Alkmaar	2005–06	Eredivisie	30	0	2	0	7	1	2 (Note: Appearances in Eredivisie qualifying for the UEFA Champions League)	1	41	2
AZ Alkmaar	2006–07	Eredivisie	28	1	3	0	11	0	4	0	46	1
AZ Alkmaar	2007–08	Eredivisie	30	2	1	0	6	1	–		37	3
AZ Alkmaar	2008–09	Eredivisie	24	1	3	0	–		–		27	1
AZ Alkmaar	2009–10	Eredivisie	24	0	2	0	5	0	–		31	0
AZ Alkmaar	2010–11	Eredivisie	8	0	3	0	7	1	–		18	1
AZ Alkmaar	Total		166	5	14	0	45	4	6	1	231	10
Wisła Kraków	2010–11	Ekstraklasa	12	0	2	0	–		–		14	0
Wisła Kraków	2011–12	Ekstraklasa	19	1	4	0	11	0	–		34	1
Wisła Kraków	2012–13	Ekstraklasa	15	0	4	0	–		–		19	0
Wisła Kraków	Total		46	1	10	0	11	0	–		67	1
Newcastle Jets	2013–14	A-League	23	2	–		–		–		23	2
Newcastle Jets	2014–15	A-League	4	0	1	0	–		–		5	0
Newcastle Jets	Total		27	2	1	0	0	0	0	0	28	2
Career total			454	16	44	2	68	5	10	1	576	24

== Honours ==
AZ

- Eredivisie: 2008–09
- Dutch Super Cup: 2009

Wisła Kraków

- Ekstraklasa: 2010–11
