= Connor Chapman =

Australian soccer player (born 1994)

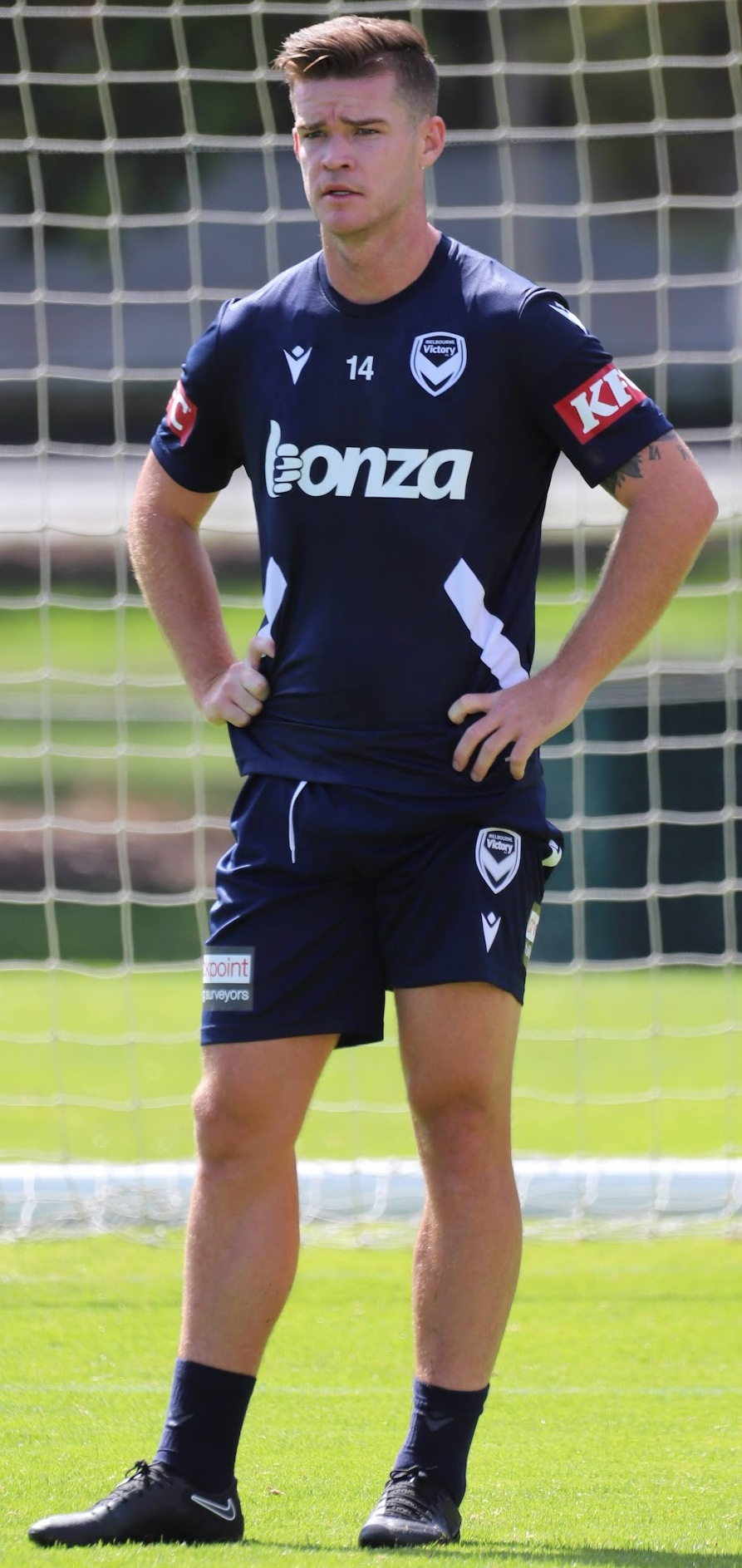

Personal information
- Full name: Connor Edward Chapman
- Date of birth: 31 October 1994 (age 32)
- Place of birth: Sydney, Australia
- Height: 1.88 m (6 ft 2 in)
- Positions: Central defender; defensive midfielder

Team information
- Current team: Gimpo FC
- Number: 77

Youth career
- 2000–2003: Moorebank Sports
- 2004: Marconi Stallions
- 2005: Southern Districts FA
- 2006–2007: Sydney Wanderers
- 2008–2009: Sutherland Sharks
- 2010–2011: AIS
- 2012: Newcastle Jets

Senior career*
Years	Team	Apps	(Gls)
2012	Newcastle Jets NPL	5	(1)
2012–2014	Newcastle Jets	25	(0)
2014–2017	Melbourne City	35	(1)
2017	Incheon United	27	(2)
2018	Pohang Steelers	33	(0)
2019	Western United	8	(0)
2020	Daejeon Hana Citizen	16	(0)
2021	FC Seoul	2	(0)
2022–2023	Brisbane Roar	17	(1)
2023–2024	Melbourne Victory	40	(1)
2024–	Gimpo FC	69	(1)

International career
2009–2011	Australia U17	19	(2)
2011–2013	Australia U20	16	(0)
2014	Australia U23	3	(0)
- * Club domestic league appearances and goals as of 6 August 2026

Connor Chapman (born 31 October 1994) is an Australian professional soccer player who plays for Gimpo FC. He has represented Australia at under-17, under-20, and under-23 level.

== Early years ==
Chapman grew up in South Western Sydney and began playing organised football at the age of five with his local club Moorebank Sports. At the age of ten he successfully trialled for the Westfields Sports High School football program and he also began playing representative football with Southern Districts within the Football NSW metropolitan reps competition. At the age of eleven he represented NSW Primary Schools (NSWPSSA) at the Australian School Sports football carnival in Darwin and at the age of thirteen he represented Football NSW at the Football Federation Australia National Youth Championships in Coffs Harbour.

As a 14-year-old, Chapman received his first national team call-up to a Joeys training camp in Canberra and he subsequently played in two friendly matches against Japan. That same year he received a scholarship to the then fledgling Central Coast Mariners Academy through the Mariners' development link with Westfields Sports High School. He was also invited to the UK to train with Sunderland A.F.C. Reserves and Academy at the Academy of Light. Following two separate visits to the Academy of Light, Chapman was offered a position at the club's academy, however, visa regulations resulted in that deal falling through.

=== Season 2010-11: National Youth League & U17 World Cup ===
When Chapman was 15, he left his home in Sydney to commence a two-year live-in football scholarship at the A.I.S. in Canberra. Whilst at the A.I.S., he played a total of 32 A-League National Youth League matches during the 2010–11 and 2011–12 seasons. He captained the A.I.S. National youth League team for 23 of those matches, and also captained the Australian U17 national team at the 2011 U17 World Cup in Mexico.

== Club career ==
=== Newcastle Jets ===
==== 2011–12: National Youth League & Mid Season A-League Contract ====
Chapman joined the Newcastle Jets from the A.I.S. on 15 January 2012, after signing a two-and-a-half-year contract with the Jets. On 18 February 2012, he made his professional A-League debut at the age of 17, where he came on as a 79th-minute substitute against Perth Glory. He made a second substitute appearance in the 2011–12 A-League season, appearing in the Newcastle Jets final match of the season against Sydney FC.

==== 2012–13: A-League and U20 World Cup ====
The 2012–13 A-League season saw Chapman make his break through into the Newcastle Jets first team, with fifteen starts and two substitute appearances throughout their twenty seven match A-League season. Commitments with the Australian U20 national team, in preparation for the U20 World Cup, meant that he was unavailable for a number of Newcastle Jets matches during the 2012–13 A-League season.

===== 2013 A-League All Stars =====
In July 2013, Chapman received a call up to the inaugural 2013 A-League All Stars Game, featuring twenty A-League players selected to play against Manchester United at ANZ Stadium in Sydney.

He was the youngest member of the inaugural A-League All Stars squad at just eighteen years of age and Coach Ange Postecoglou introduced him into the match in the 84th minute. This was Manchester United's only match in Australia during their 2013 pre-season tour of Australasia and a full array of first team players participated including Robin van Persie, Ryan Giggs, Rio Ferdinand and Danny Welbeck. The match was reported to be a sell out with more than 83,000 fans and spectators in attendance.

==== 2013–14: A-League and under-23 national team ====
Chapman made a strong start to the 2013–14 A-League season, starting for the Newcastle Jets in their first six matches of the season before succumbing to an ankle injury. After those first six matches the Newcastle Jets were equal second on the A-league points ladder and were third on goal difference. His injury saw him ruled out of the match day squad for several weeks, during which time he penned a one-year contract extension with the Newcastle Jets, despite strong interest from a number of other A-League clubs.

Chapman was selected for the Australian U23 team that competed at the 2013 AFC U-22 Championship, in January 2014 in Muscat, Oman. The resulting travel commitments with the Australian U23 team meant that he was unavailable for a number of Newcastle Jets matches throughout January 2014. Whilst in Oman, the Newcastle Jets parted company with Head Coach Gary van Egmond and appointed Clayton Zane as caretaker. In total, Chapman played nineteen matches for the Newcastle Jets A-League and NYL teams throughout the 2013–14 season with only one loss recorded during his appearances.

On 9 May 2014, the Newcastle Jets announced that they had mutually agreed to terminate Chapman’s contract amid reports he was about to be signed by Melbourne Heart.

=== Melbourne City ===
On 20 May 2014, Melbourne Heart announced that Chapman had been signed on a two-year contract. It was speculated that he was the first signing under the new CFG ownership structure.

==== 2014–15: A-League ====
Within days of joining Melbourne City for the commencement of pre-season training, Chapman was diagnosed with glandular fever. This debilitating illness saw him miss the whole of the 2014–15 A-League pre-season, along with the first eight matches of the season. Despite this setback, he sought to repay the Club's faith by turning in some impressive displays, once available for selection. His performances contributed to a nomination for the NAB Young Footballer of the Year award for the month of February, 2015.

==== 2015–16: A-League ====
Chapman commenced the 2015–16 A-League season in solid form as a regular within the Melbourne City starting eleven, however, in December 2015 he sustained a medial cruciate ligament tear during a match against Newcastle Jets which rendered him unavailable for selection until the last few matches of the season.

==== 2016–17: 2016 FFA Cup Champions and transfer ====
Chapman was a core member of the Melbourne City team crowned 2016 FFA Cup Champions, but at the commencement of the 2016–17 A-League season he found himself limited to just a handful of first team appearances. Selection decisions aside, Melbourne City were not defeated in any of the matches that he played in during the 2016 FFA Cup competition and the 2016–17 A-League season.

During the January 2017 international transfer window, Incheon United tabled a transfer bid for Chapman and after several weeks of negotiation the transfer was accepted by Melbourne City.

=== Incheon United ===
==== Season 2017: K League 1 ====
Chapman’s international transfer to the South Korean K League 1 club Incheon United was completed in January 2017, ahead of the 2017 K League Classic season.

=== Pohang Steelers ===
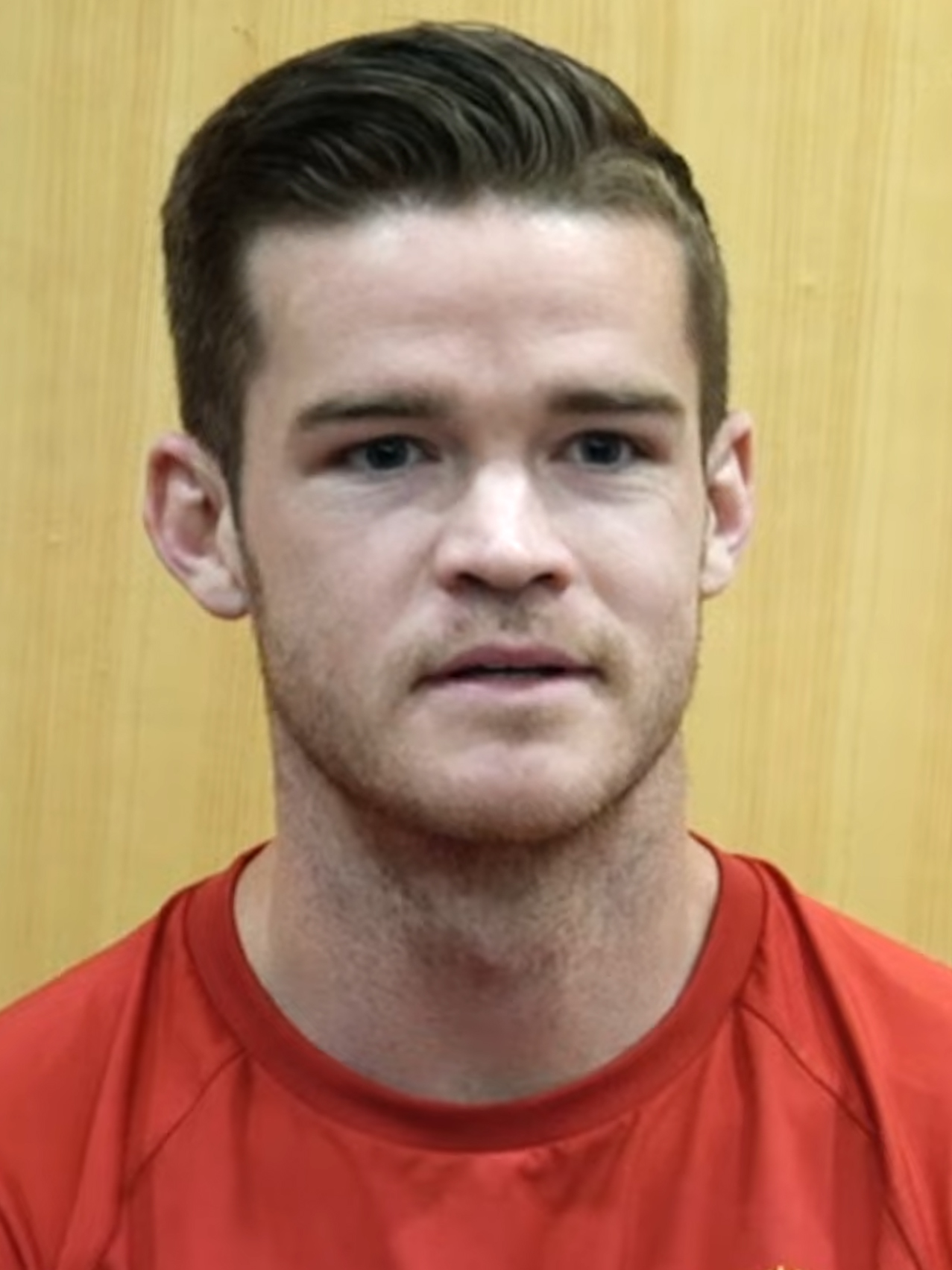
Chapman with FC Seoul in 2021

==== Season 2018: K League 1 ====
Chapman signed with another K League 1 club Pohang Steelers in January 2018, ahead of the 2018 K League 1 season.

At the end of a successful 2018 season with Pohang finishing 4th in the K League 1, Chapman signed a two-year contract extension with Pohang, tying him to the club until the end of the 2020 season.

In February 2019, it was reported by Korean media that Chapman was trying to force a move to Europe and had been infected by a brain parasite, which was reported to be false by Chapman. After suffering a stomach bug during the 2019 pre-season, Pohang were unhappy with Chapman's recovery plan and following prolonged talks between the club and the player, the club decided to terminate his contract.

=== Western United ===
On 7 March 2019, Chapman signed with the newly formed A-League team Western United.

=== Daejeon Hana Citizen ===
On 4 January 2020, Chapman signed with Daejeon Hana Citizen. On 24 February 2021, his contract with the club was terminated.

=== FC Seoul ===
On 12 July 2021, Chapman joined with FC Seoul on a free transfer, signing an 18-month contract.

=== Brisbane Roar ===
On 11 February 2022, Chapman returned to Australia, joining Brisbane Roar and signing an 18-month contract. He made his first start on 3 May 2022, against Central Coast Mariners. On 7 February 2023, Brisbane announced the departure of Chapman. During his spell at the club, the team reached the semifinals of the Australia Cup for the first time.

=== Melbourne Victory ===
On the same date, February 7, Melbourne Victory announced the signing of Chapman on a contract until the end of the 2023–24 season.

== International career ==
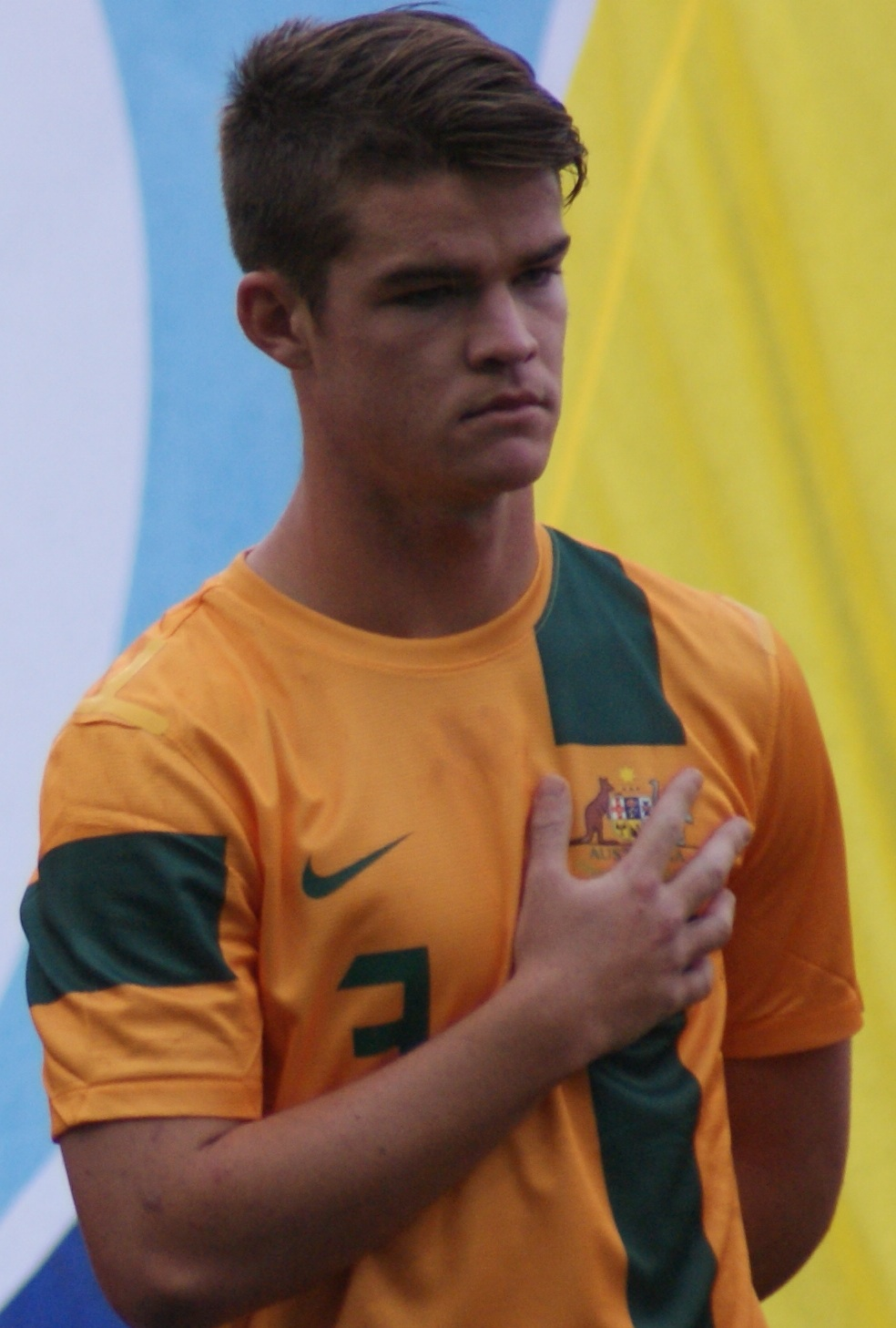
Chapman with the Young Socceroos in 2013

To date, Chapman has represented Australia at the U17, U20, and U23 levels and started in all of Australia's matches at the 2011 FIFA U-17 World Cup and the 2013 FIFA U-20 World Cup.

He captained the U17 team at the 2010 AFC U-16 Championship in Uzbekistan and in Australia's four matches at the 2011 FIFA U-17 World Cup in Mexico. Australia were grouped with the Ivory Coast, Brazil and Denmark and made it out of their group to the knockout phase where they were eliminated by Uzbekistan. He was identified by the FIFA Technical Study Group as one of Australia's two outstanding players for the tournament.

He was a member of the U20 national team that progressed undefeated through the 2012 AFC U-19 Championship qualification tournament in Malaysia. Connor was also selected into the U20 team that competed in Group E at the inaugural 2013 AFC U-22 Asian Cup qualification tournament in Indonesia and qualified for the finals. He was also selected into the U20 team that qualified for the 2013 FIFA U-20 World Cup by reaching the semi-finals of the 2012 AFC U-19 Championship.

In June 2013, Chapman was selected into the Australian U20 team that were drawn in Group C at the 2013 edition of the FIFA U20 World Cup, alongside Colombia, El Salvador and the tournament hosts Turkey. Australia were eliminated at the group stage of the tournament. Despite their results, it was widely reported within the Australian media that this particular team had demonstrated an exciting style of football, not evidenced from Australia's youth teams for quite some time. In addition, he was recognized as one of Australia's outstanding players throughout the tournament, having started all three group matches.

In December 2013, Chapman was selected into the Australian U23 team that competed at the 2013 AFC U-22 Championship, in January 2014 in Muscat, Oman. As the vice-captain, he captained the U23 team for their first match of the tournament against Kuwait because the team captain did not play. Despite finishing at the top of their group against Kuwait, Syria and Japan, Australia was eliminated at the quarter-final stage of the tournament in a 2–1 loss to Saudi Arabia.

== Career statistics ==
=== Club ===
As of 11 December 2023

Club	Season	League			Cup		Asia		Other		Total	
Club	Season	Division	Apps	Goals	Apps	Goals	Apps	Goals	Apps	Goals	Apps	Goals
Newcastle Jets	2011–12	A-League	2	0	0	0	—		—		2	0
Newcastle Jets	2012–13	A-League	17	0	0	0	—		—		17	0
Newcastle Jets	2013–14	A-League	6	0	0	0	—		—		6	0
Newcastle Jets	Total		25	0	0	0	0	0	0	0	25	0
Melbourne City	2014–15	A-League	16	0	0	0	—		—		16	0
Melbourne City	2015–16	A-League	14	1	3	0	—		—		17	1
Melbourne City	2016–17	A-League	5	0	3	0	—		—		8	0
Melbourne City	Total		35	1	6	0	0	0	0	0	41	1
Incheon United	2017	K League 1	27	2	1	0	—		—		28	2
Pohang Steelers	2018	K League 1	33	0	0	0	—		—		33	0
Western United	2019–20	A-League	8	0	0	0	—		—		8	0
Daejeon Hana Citizen	2020	K League 2	15	0	1	0	—		1	0	17	0
FC Seoul	2021	K League 1	2	0	0	0	—		—		2	0
Brisbane Roar	2021–22	A-League	4	0	0	0	—		—		4	0
Brisbane Roar	2022–23	A-League	13	1	5	0	—		—		18	1
Brisbane Roar	Total		17	1	5	0	0	0	0	0	22	1
Melbourne Victory	2022–23	A-League	12	0	0	0	—		—		12	0
Melbourne Victory	2023–24	A-League	7	0	0	0	—		—		7	0
Melbourne Victory	Total		19	0	0	0	0	0	0	0	19	0
Career Total			181	4	12	0	0	0	1	0	193	4

== Honours ==
Individual

- 2013 A-League All Stars Selection
- NAB Young Footballer of the Year Nominee: February 2015

Club

- 2016 Westfield FFA Cup Champions
