= Radovan Pavicevic =

Australian soccer player

Personal information
- Full name: Radovan Pavicevic
- Date of birth: 28 August 1995 (age 31)
- Place of birth: Australia
- Position: Striker

Team information
- Current team: Canterbury Bankstown

Youth career
- WSHS
- –2013: Marconi Stallions
- 2013–2015: Newcastle Jets

Senior career*
Years	Team	Apps	(Gls)
2013–2015	Newcastle Jets NPL	35	(15)
2015–2016	Newcastle Jets	17	(1)
2017–2020	Sydney Olympic	60	(12)
2020–2023	Bonnyrigg White Eagles	73	(14)
2027–	Canterbury Bankstown	0	(0)
- * Club domestic league appearances and goals as of 10 October 2023 ‡ National team caps and goals as of 24 January 2015

Radovan Pavicevic (born 28 August 1995) is an Australian professional footballer who currently plays as a striker for Canterbury Bankstown in NSW League One.

== Career ==
=== Early life and career ===
Pavicevic is the son of Andrej Pavicevic, an Australian racing car driver. Radovan was also involved in racing Go-Karts, and still holds lap records as a rookie at Newcastle Kart Racing Club at Cameron Park.

Pavicevic attended, and played for Westfields Sports High School winning the 2010 Bill Turner Cup, as well as Marconi Stallions, before signing a youth contract with the Newcastle Jets youth team. In 2014 Pavicevic severely broke his arm during a Northern NSW NPL fixture against South Cardiff FC, having run into the perimeter fence surrounding the field during the game. The break in his arm required surgery to put a metal plate and 12 screws into his left humerus, and there were fears he could suffer permanent nerve damage as a result of the injury.

=== Newcastle Jets ===
Pavicevic made his senior debut for the Newcastle Jets off the bench in a 0–7 loss to Adelaide United at Coopers Stadium. His first goal would come shortly afterwards in a 2–1 defeat to Brisbane Roar. These early appearances would impress Jets manager Phil Stubbins enough, to earn him a two-year contract.

Pavicevic was released by the Jets in December 2016, having made 17 appearances for the side.
