= Travis Cooper =

Australian soccer player (born 1993)

Personal information
- Full name: Travis William Cooper
- Date of birth: 21 December 1993 (age 32)
- Place of birth: Buderim, Australia
- Height: 1.84 m (6 ft 0 in)
- Positions: Striker; right winger

Youth career
- –2011: Northern Tigers
- 2011–2012: Central Coast Mariners
- 2012–2013: VVV-Venlo

Senior career*
| Years | Team | Apps | (Gls) |
| 2011 | Northern Tigers | 21 | (9) |
| 2013–2015 | VVV-Venlo | 14 | (1) |
| 2015 | Newcastle Jets | 2 | (0) |
| 2015 | Adamstown Rosebuds | 11 | (2) |
| 2016–2017 | Manly United | 22 | (3) |
| 2017–2018 | South West Queensland Thunder | 19 | (7) |
| 2019 | GHFA Spirit FC | 26 | (7) |

International career
| 2013 | Australia U20 | 2 | (0) |
| 2014 | Australia U23 | 2 | (1) |
- * Club domestic league appearances and goals as of 26 September 2019

Travis William Cooper (born 21 December 1993) is an Australian professional association football player. He plays as a striker or right winger for South West Queensland Thunder in the National Premier Leagues.

== Early life ==
Cooper attended The King's School, in North Parramatta, Australia. He also attended the University of Technology, Sydney, for a short period before moving to Venlo.

== Senior career ==
In August 2012, Cooper signed a two-year contract with VVV-Venlo, who were playing in the Eredivisie at the time.

He made his professional debut for the club on 9 August 2013, against Willem II, coming off the bench in the 86th minute, and provided the assist for the second goal in the side's 2–0 victory.

Cooper scored his first goal for the club in the side's 3–2 victory over Helmond Sport, coming on the 85th minute to score.

On 3 February 2015, he signed a contract with Newcastle Jets for the remainder of the 2014–15 A-League season.
