= Allan Welsh =

Australian soccer player

Personal information
- Full name: Allan Clifford Welsh
- Date of birth: 18 February 1994 (age 32)
- Place of birth: Adelaide, Australia
- Height: 1.92 m (6 ft 4 in)
- Positions: Central defender; defensive midfielder

Team information
- Current team: Adelaide Comets
- Number: 22

Youth career
- –2011: SASI
- 2010–2012: Adelaide United

Senior career*
Years	Team	Apps	(Gls)
2013–2014	Croydon Kings	39	(3)
2014–2015	Newcastle Jets	16	(0)
2015	Croydon Kings	8	(1)
2015–	Adelaide Comets	195	(78)

International career^{‡}
2011	Australia U-20	1	(0)
- * Club domestic league appearances and goals as of 19 September 2024 ‡ National team caps and goals as of 11 May 2015

Allan Clifford Welsh (born 18 February 1994) is an Australian professional footballer who plays as a central defender for Adelaide Comets in the National Premier Leagues.

== Club career ==
On 12 September 2014 he signed his first senior professional contract with A-League side Newcastle Jets. At the end on the 2014–15 season he was released from the club and returned to Croydon Kings in the National Premier Leagues.
