= Taylor Regan =

Australian soccer player (born 1988)

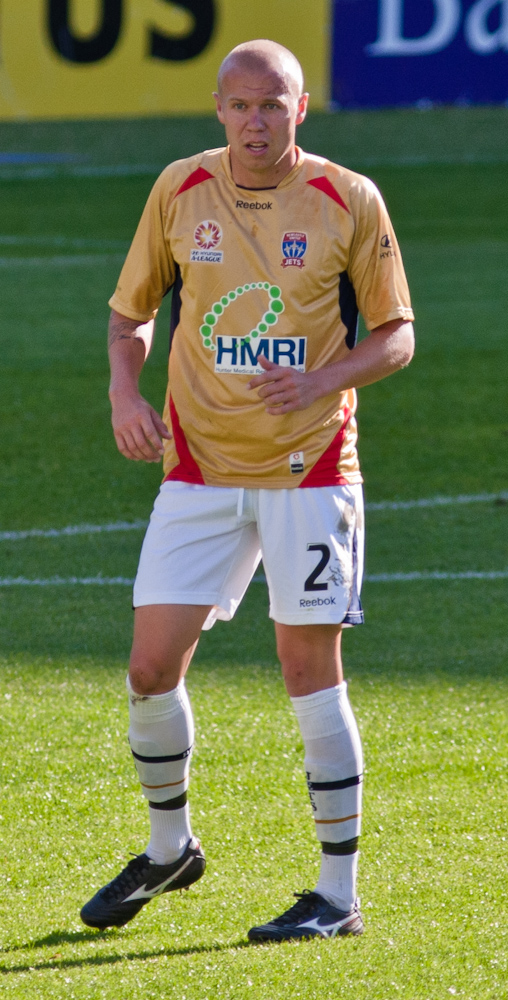
- Regan playing for Newcastle Jets in 2010

Personal information
- Full name: Taylor Francis George Regan
- Date of birth: 16 November 1988 (age 38)
- Place of birth: Newcastle, Australia
- Height: 1.87 m (6 ft 1 1/2 in)
- Position: Centre back

Team information
- Current team: Charlestown Azzurri

Youth career
- Dudley Redhead
- Highfields Azzurri
- Newcastle Jets

Senior career*
Years	Team	Apps	(Gls)
2005–2008	Highfields Azzurri	47	(3)
2010–2015	Newcastle Jets	68	(1)
2016	Negeri Sembilan	28	(4)
2016–2018	Adelaide United	28	(0)
2019–2020	Selangor	31	(1)
2021	Sarawak United	21	(3)
2022	Newcastle Jets	10	(0)
2022–	Charlestown Azzurri	72	(6)

International career
2004–2005	Australia U17		
- * Club domestic league appearances and goals as of 12 July 2025

Taylor Francis George Regan (born 16 November 1988) is an Australian soccer player who plays as a defender for Charlestown Azzurri.

== Playing career ==
=== Newcastle Jets ===
Regan joined the Jets as part of the youth system in 2008 from state league club Azzurri FC. He captained the team and played primarily as a center back. On 3 June 2010 his strong performances were rewarded with a one-year contract. Taylor Regan made his Debut on 16 October 2010 in Round 10 against Brisbane Roar. The Match finished 1–1 and Regan was a standout performer, gaining praise from coaches and senior players.

During the 12/13 season Regan made 20 appearances and was awarded the Ray Baartz medal as player of the season. An award chosen by former greats of the club. In 2015 Regan was presented with the Newcastle Jets Members Award for Player of the season.

In early February 2015, Regan was made captain of the Newcastle Jets by coach Phil Stubbins following the mid-season sackings of several players for disciplinary reasons.

Regan left the Jets at the conclusion of the 2014–15 A-League season, after being told his contract would not be renewed, following a tumultuous period at the club both and off the field.

=== Negeri Sembilan ===
In early December 2015 it was revealed that Regan had signed with Negeri Sembilan in the Malaysia Premier League for the 2016 season. At the club's Season Launch on 12 January, Regan was announced as captain for the upcoming season. He left the club in October 2016.

=== Adelaide United ===
After a successful season in Malaysia, Regan returned to Australia after signing a contract with Adelaide United as an injury replacement for Jordan Elsey. In March 2017, after 10 appearances in all competitions, Regan signed a two-year contract extension with Adelaide United. With his physical style Regan became adored by Reds fans and helped the club win the 2018 FFA cup.

=== Selangor ===
On 11 January 2019, Regan return to Malaysia and signed for Selangor on a one-year contract. With a 3rd-place finish in the Super League and a brilliant Cup run, Regan signed a one-year extension with the club at the end of the 2019 season, which saw him become captain for 2020.

=== Sarawak United ===
In 2021, Regan signed for Malaysia Premier League side Sarawak United on a two-year deal. However, due to financial issues facing the club, Captain Regan terminated in December 2021 and returned to Australia.

=== Return to Newcastle Jets ===
Regan returned to the Newcastle Jets on 19 January 2022, signing for the remainder of the 2021–22 A-League Men season.

== Personal life ==
On 23 May 2015, Regan married long time girlfriend Jessica. They have 2 sons, Bodhi and Jax.
