= Mitchell Oxborrow =

Australian professional football player (born 1995)

Personal information
- Full name: Mitchell Tony Oxborrow
- Date of birth: 18 February 1995 (age 31)
- Place of birth: Dagenham, England
- Position: Central midfielder

Team information
- Current team: Olympic Kingsway
- Number: 8

Youth career
- 2010–2011: WA NTC
- 2011–2012: A.I.S.
- 2012–2014: Newcastle Jets
- 2014–2017: Perth Glory

Senior career*
Years	Team	Apps	(Gls)
2012–2014	Newcastle Jets NPL	17	(1)
2012–2014	Newcastle Jets	6	(0)
2015–2017	Perth Glory NPL	4	(0)
2015–2017	Perth Glory	26	(1)
2017	Broadmeadow Magic	6	(3)
2017–2018	Brisbane Roar	17	(0)
2018–2019	Broadmeadow Magic	32	(10)
2020	Lambton Jaffas	13	(2)
2021	Gwelup Croatia	12	(4)
2021–2023	Perth Glory	19	(0)
2023–	Olympic Kingsway	21	(0)

International career^{‡}
2011	Australia U-17	2	(0)
2012–2014	Australia U-20	3	(1)
- * Club domestic league appearances and goals as of 8 June 2024 ‡ National team caps and goals as of 8 October 2013

Mitchell Tony Oxborrow (born 18 February 1995) is an Australian professional football (soccer) player who plays as a central midfielder for Olympic Kingsway in NPL WA.

== Early life ==
Oxborrow was born and raised in the East End of London until age ten, when he moved with his family to Perth. Oxborrow attended both Woodvale Primary School and Woodvale Secondary College where he competed in the football program. Oxborrow showed talent from a young age.

== Playing career ==
He scored his last A-League goal in a 2–2 draw against Western Sydney Wanderers on 19 December 2015 with a long-range direct free kick.

Oxborrow returned to Newcastle in June 2017, joining Broadmeadow Magic in the National Premier Leagues Northern NSW but cited his ambition to return to the A-League.

Oxborrow signed a one-year contract with Brisbane Roar in August 2017. In May 2018, Oxborrow was released along with teammate Corey Gameiro.

Oxborrow returned to Broadmeadow Magic in 2018, where he intentionally spat on an Adamstown Rosebud player. He was suspended for 6 games.

Oxborrow returned to Perth Glory for the 2021/22 A-League Season.
