= James Virgili =

Australian soccer player (born 1992)

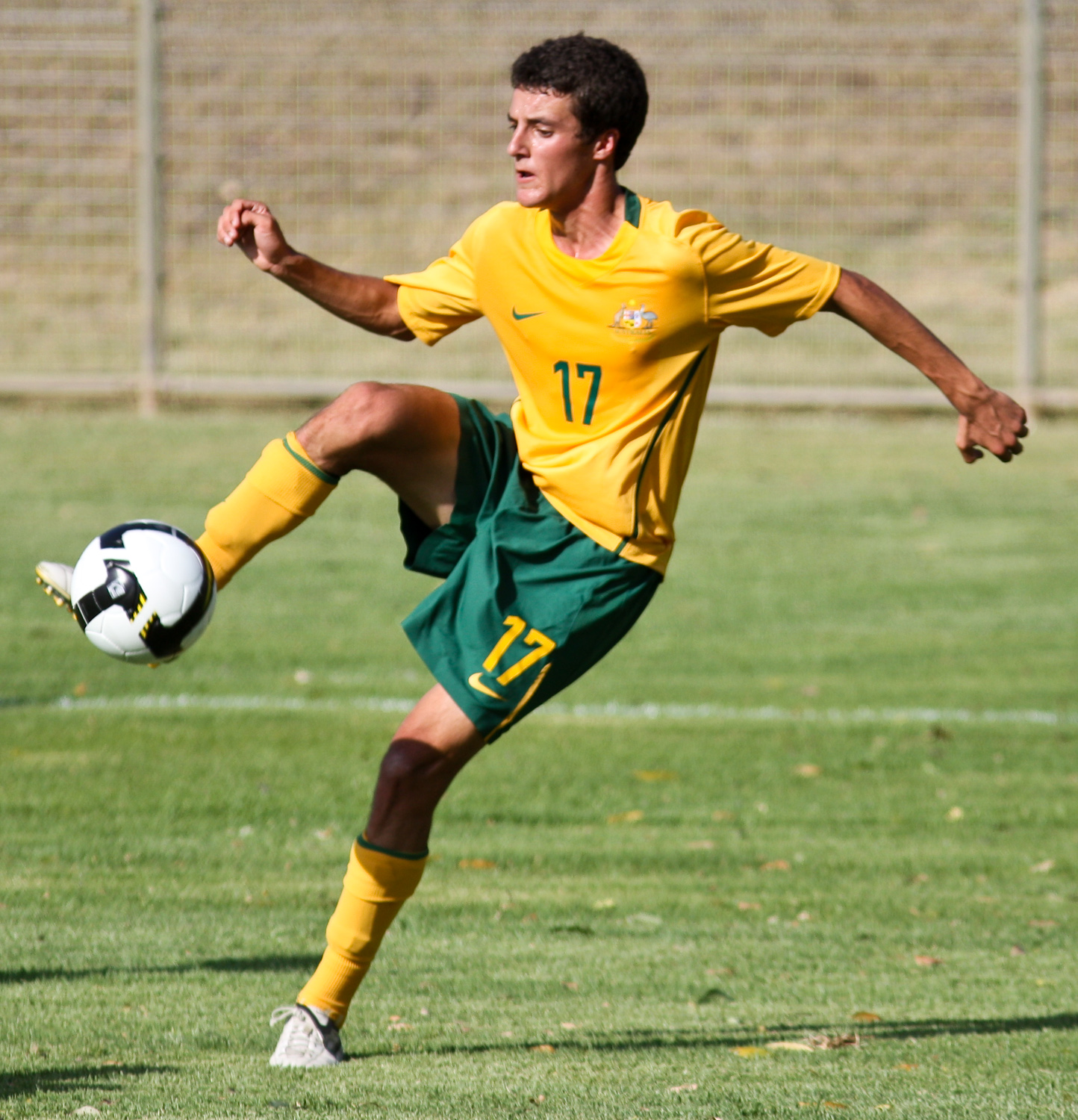
- Virgili playing for the Australian under-18 team in 2009

Personal information
- Full name: James Robert Virgili
- Date of birth: 8 July 1992 (age 34)
- Place of birth: Newcastle, Australia
- Height: 1.75 m (5 ft 9 in)
- Position: Winger

Youth career
- Broadmeadow Magic
- 2007–2008: NSWIS
- 2008–2013: Newcastle Jets

Senior career*
Years	Team	Apps	(Gls)
2009–2015	Newcastle Jets	57	(0)
2012	Newcastle Jets NPL	10	(7)
2016–2021	Broadmeadow Magic	108	(74)
2022	Lambton Jaffas	24	(10)

International career
2007–2009	Australia U17	6	(1)
2010–2011	Australia U20	1	(0)
- * Club domestic league appearances and goals

James Robert Virgili (born 8 July 1992) is an Australian former professional soccer player who played for Newcastle Jets in the A-League.

== Career ==
On 4 January 2009, Virgili made his senior debut with Newcastle Jets as a substitute against Wellington Phoenix. This also made him the youngest player in A-League history to make his debut at 16 years and 180 days. Virgili broke into the first team in the 2012–13 Hyundai A-League season. He became a regular starter known for his high speed and his ability to get past players with his dribbling and ball control. This benefited teammates such as strikers Emile Heskey and Ryan Griffiths.

Virgili was given a trial at Scottish Club Celtic, it was revealed that Celtic were keeping tabs on the young Australian.

Virgili was released at the end of the 2014–15 season following a broken ankle sustained in training.

== Career statistics ==
Appearances and goals by club, season and competition
Club	Season	League			Cup		Continental		Total	
Club	Season	Division	Apps	Goals	Apps	Goals	Apps	Goals	Apps	Goals
Newcastle Jets	2008–09	A-League Men	2	0	–		N/A			
Newcastle Jets	2009–10	A-League Men	0	0	–		N/A			
Newcastle Jets	2010–11	A-League Men	8	0	–		N/A			
Newcastle Jets	2011–12	A-League Men	4	0	–		N/A			
Newcastle Jets	2012–13	A-League Men	25	0	–		N/A			
Newcastle Jets	2013–14	A-League Men	10	0	–		N/A			
Newcastle Jets	2014–15	A-League Men	8	0	1	0	N/A			
Broadmeadow Magic	2016	National Premier Leagues Northern NSW	18	18			N/A			
Broadmeadow Magic	2017	National Premier Leagues Northern NSW	22	11			N/A			
Broadmeadow Magic	2018	National Premier Leagues Northern NSW	18	14			N/A			
Broadmeadow Magic	2019	National Premier Leagues Northern NSW	18	13			N/A			
Broadmeadow Magic	2020	National Premier Leagues Northern NSW	16	9			N/A			
Broadmeadow Magic	2021	National Premier Leagues Northern NSW	16	9			N/A			
Lambton Jaffas FC	2022	National Premier Leagues Northern NSW	18	9			N/A			
			183	83			N/A			
