= Nick Cowburn =

Australian professional footballer

Personal information
- Full name: Nicholas Chad Cowburn
- Date of birth: 7 March 1995 (age 31)
- Place of birth: Newcastle, Australia
- Height: 1.83 m (6 ft 0 in)
- Positions: Defensive midfielder; right back

Team information
- Current team: Newcastle Croatia FC

Youth career
- Toronto Awaba Stags
- 2011–2015: Newcastle Jets

Senior career*
Years	Team	Apps	(Gls)
2012–2015	Newcastle Jets NPL	57	(9)
2014–2019	Newcastle Jets	68	(1)
2019–2020	Maitland FC	18	(4)
2020	Toronto Awaba Stags	4	(2)
2021	Lake Macquarie City	14	(5)
2022	Valentine FC	16	(3)
2023	Gold Coast United	22	(1)
2024	Valentine FC	19	(7)
2025	Maitland FC	5	(1)
2025–	Newcastle Croatia FC	1	(1)

International career^{‡}
2014	Australia U-20	3	(0)
2017–2018	Australia U-23	5	(2)
- * Club domestic league appearances and goals as of 5 April 2025 ‡ National team caps and goals as of 17 January 2018

Nicholas Chad Cowburn (born 7 March 1995) is an Australian professional footballer who plays as a Midfielder (association football) for Newcastle Croatia FC.

== Football career ==
Cowburn first started his youth career at Toronto Awaba Stags before joining the Newcastle jets in 2011. Cowburn has made 47 first team appearances for The Jets since 2014. In January 2016, Cowburn, penned a two-season contract with The Jets.

== Personal life ==
Nick's father, Brett Cowburn, played in the NSL for Newcastle KB United, and his brother also appeared in the NSL for Newcastle Jets in the 2003–04 season.
