= Brandon Lundy =

Australian soccer player

Personal information
- Full name: Brandon Lundy
- Date of birth: 5 July 1996 (age 30)
- Place of birth: Newcastle, Australia
- Height: 1.80 m (5 ft 11 in)
- Position: Full back

Youth career
- 2012: FNSW NTC
- 2013–2015: Newcastle Jets

Senior career*
Years	Team	Apps	(Gls)
2013–2015	Newcastle Jets NPL	35	(17)
2014–2016	Newcastle Jets	5	(0)
2016–2019	APIA Leichhardt	63	(4)
2019–2022	Avondale FC	40	(2)
2023	Oakleigh Cannons	24	(0)
- * Club domestic league appearances and goals as of 2 October 2024

Brandon Lundy (born 5 July 1996) is an Australian footballer who plays as a full back for Avondale FC in the National Premier Leagues Victoria.

== Club career ==
He made his senior professional debut for Newcastle Jets in the 2014 FFA Cup in a match against Perth Glory at the Wanderers Oval on 5 August 2014. Perth won the match 0–2 in regulation time.
