= Michael Kantarovski =

Australian soccer player

Personal information
- Full name: Michael Kantarovski
- Date of birth: 22 May 1995 (age 31)
- Place of birth: Newcastle, Australia
- Position: Central midfielder

Youth career
- –2014: Broadmeadow Magic
- 2014–2016: Newcastle Jets

Senior career*
Years	Team	Apps	(Gls)
2012–2013	Broadmeadow Magic	9	(0)
2014	Newcastle Jets NPL	37	(5)
2015	Newcastle Jets	1	(0)
2016	Broadmeadow Magic	18	(2)
2017–2023	Lambton Jaffas	81	(6)
- * Club domestic league appearances and goals as of 17 September 2022

Michael Kantarovski (born 22 May 1995) is an Australian professional footballer who last played as a central midfielder for Lambton Jaffas in the National Premier Leagues Northern NSW. He is the younger brother of Newcastle Jets midfielder Ben Kantarovski.
