= Phil Stubbins =

Association football coach (born 1962)

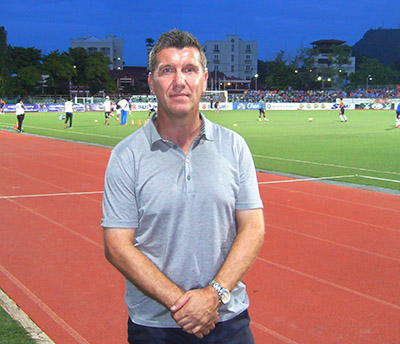

Personal information
- Date of birth: 18 October 1962 (age 64)
- Place of birth: Hull, England
- Position: Midfielder

Senior career*
Years	Team	Apps	(Gls)
1988–1992	Heidelberg United	201	(41)
1992	Morwell Falcons	10	(0)
1993	Polis	26	(8)
1993–1994	South Melbourne	8	(0)
1994–1998	Westvale Olympic	130	(53)
1999	Sanfrecce Hiroshima	21	(6)
1999	Heidelberg United	15	(5)
2000–2004	Whittlesea Stallions	44	(7)
Total		414	(120)

Managerial career
- 1994–1998: Westvale Olympic
- 2000–2004: Whittlesea Stallions
- 2004–2005: Heidelberg United
- 2006–2007: Richmond SC
- 2005–2006: Victorian State Team
- 2007–2011: Adelaide United (assistant)
- 2011–2012: Australian Institute of Sport
- 2012: Police United (technical director)
- 2012–2013: Bangkok Glass
- 2013: Ayutthaya
- 2014: Newcastle Jets
- 2015–2017: West Adelaide
- 2020: Campbelltown City
- 2022: Adelaide Croatia Raiders
- 2023: Adelaide University SC (FSA State League 2)
- 2024: Cumberland United FC (FSA State League 1)
- * Club domestic league appearances and goals

Phil Stubbins (born 18 October 1962) is a football manager and former player who is the head coach of Adelaide University Soccer Club in the National Premier Leagues competition in South Australia.

== Early years ==
Stubbins is from Hull, England, migrating to Australia in 1988. After schoolboy beginnings with his hometown club Hull City AFC, Stubbins also played top flight Football in Australia for both Heidelberg United and South Melbourne FC, as well as fulfilling further playing opportunities within South East Asia.

Leaving Australian football altogether for a period in 1993, he pursued interests onto the Australasian PGA Golf Tour.

His golfing ambitions failed however, lured back to football as player/manager of Westvale Olympic FC in 1994.

He spent the next few years fulfilling a coaching/playing role until retiring from playing altogether in 2001.

== Australasia PGA Tour ==
Although never actually participating on the PGA golf tour, Stubbins successfully secured his Australasian PGA Tour card in 1993 and 1994. He led the field at qualifying school in 1993 by shooting a -5 under par 68 on the opening day. Venue – Spring Valley Golf Club, Victoria.

== Coaching career ==
Westvale Olympic FC

Stubbins first stint into club management was with Westvale Olympic. Together with the club he successfully travelled through the State leagues of Victorian football by claiming a championship in each of the years 94, 95, 96, 98.

Whittlesea Stallions FC

Whittlesea Stallions FC became a newly formed member of the Victorian State League in 2000. Stubbins coached the youthful Stallions to two championships in their first two campaigns before moving on in 2004.

Heidelberg United FC

As a former player of the club, Stubbins returned as coach to Heidelberg United in 2004. His first year in charge was again to prove fruitful, as the club were crowned champions of the Victorian State League, 1st division. The club finished Runner/up in the Victorian Premier League the following season and also attained a grand final berth against eventual winners Green Gully FC.

Richmond FC

Joining the German backed outfit in last position on the Victorian Premier League table as their Manager, Stubbins successfully helped steer the club away from relegation and finish a respectable mid-table.

Coach of the Year

Stubbins was named Victorian, Coach of the Year in 2005/6 and was appointed Head Coach of the Victorian State team. During this time the representative team won the Mayor's Cup tournament in China by overcoming Tianjin Teda FC in the Final.

Adelaide United

In 2007 Stubbins joined Adelaide United of the Australian A-League as first team Coach with Aurelio Vidmar, as manager. Together they experienced many successful occasions during their Asian Champions League forays and a place in the prestigious World Club Cup in 2008.

They also held a place in the A-League Grand Final of 2009, losing 1–0 to Melbourne Victory.

Australian Institute of Sport

Stubbins spent a year with the Men's football program in Canberra. The institute is a facility for Sports Science and Best Practice.

Thailand

In 2012 Stubbins further expanded on his football experiences by taking an offer to work in South East Asia and the Thai Premier League, in particular.

He spent a year with Police United FC as their Technical Director before moving over to Bangkok Glass FC with (7) games remaining of their campaign as Manager/Head Coach. Stubbins concluded the campaign as 'Coach of the Month' for Thailand. However, both parties agreed on a split before the season got under way in March 2013.

In September 2013 Stubbins accepted a mid-season offer to join Ayutthaya FC of Thailand. The 1st division club ultimately going on to consolidate an 8th-place finish in the league after undertaking a twelve-game unbeaten run under Stubbins guidance.

Newcastle Jets

Stubbins signed as Head Coach of the Australian A-League club the Newcastle Jets on 5 May 2014.

This proved a difficult time for Stubbins, as the club continued its struggles to find finals football for the fifth straight season despite the change of management.

Prince Alfred College

In October 2015, Stubbins joined the Prince Alfred College as Head of Football.

Campbelltown City SC

In September 2019 Phil Stubbins was appointed Head Coach with Campbelltown City SC, after serving a year as assistant coach. The club were crowned National Premier league Champions of South Australia in 2019 and 2020.

Adelaide Croatia Raiders

Operating with a strong emphasis on youth development, the Adelaide Croatia Raiders narrowly missed securing promotion during the 2022 season's finals series.

Adelaide University SC

Despite being appointed as head coach of the Adelaide University SC State League team shortly before the season began, Phil successfully built a team that reached the 2023 season's finals series. Due to the successful 2023 campaign, Phil's contract as head coach was extended for the 2024 season.

== Asian Champions League ==
Adelaide United became the first ever Australian football team to reach an Asian Champions League Final when they played Japanese Champions Gamba Osaka in 2008.

Most notable wins from ACL campaigns.. Adelaide United 3v0 Bunyodkor (Uzbekistan Champions) / Adelaide United 1v0 Kashima Antlers (Japanese champions) / Shaendong Lueng (Chinese champions) 0v2 Adelaide United / Pohang Steelers (Sth Korean Champions) 0v2 Adelaide United

== FIFA World Club Cup ==
In 2008 Adelaide United participated in the FIFA Club World Cup with Manchester United the eventual winners of the Tokyo held event.

Adelaide United defeated Waitakere FC NZ 2–1 in their opening match and further went on to defeat African Champions, Al Ahly FC of Egypt 1–0.

They exited the 2008 FIFA Club World Cup in the Quarter finals by losing to eventual finalist's Gamba Osaka of Japan 0–1.

== Australian Institute of Sport ==
Stubbins joined Football Federation Australia in 2011. Working as an assistant/analyst with various Australian National youth teams and also with the Men's football program at the Australian Institute of Sport.

== Thailand ==
In 2012 Stubbins further expanded on his football experiences by taking an offer to work in South East Asia and the Thai Premier League, in particular.

He spent a year with Police United FC as their Technical Director before moving over to Bangkok Glass FC with (7) games remaining of their campaign as Manager/Head Coach. Stubbins concluded the campaign with Bangkok Glass FC as 'Coach of the Month' for Thailand. However, both parties agreed on a split before the season got under way in March 2013.

In September 2013 Stubbins accepted an offer to join 16th placed Ayutthaya FC of Thailand. The 1st division club ultimately going on to consolidate an 8th-place finish in the league after undertaking a twelve-game unbeaten run under Stubbins guidance.

== Coaching accreditations ==
Pro Diploma / AFC 'A' Licence / F.A. International Licence

== Managerial statistics ==
Team	Nat	From	To	Record				
Team	Nat	From	To	G	W	D	L	Win %
Newcastle Jets	(Australia)	5 May 2014	26 May 2015	28	3	8	17	10.71
Total				28	3	8	17	10.71
