= List of Melbourne City FC players =

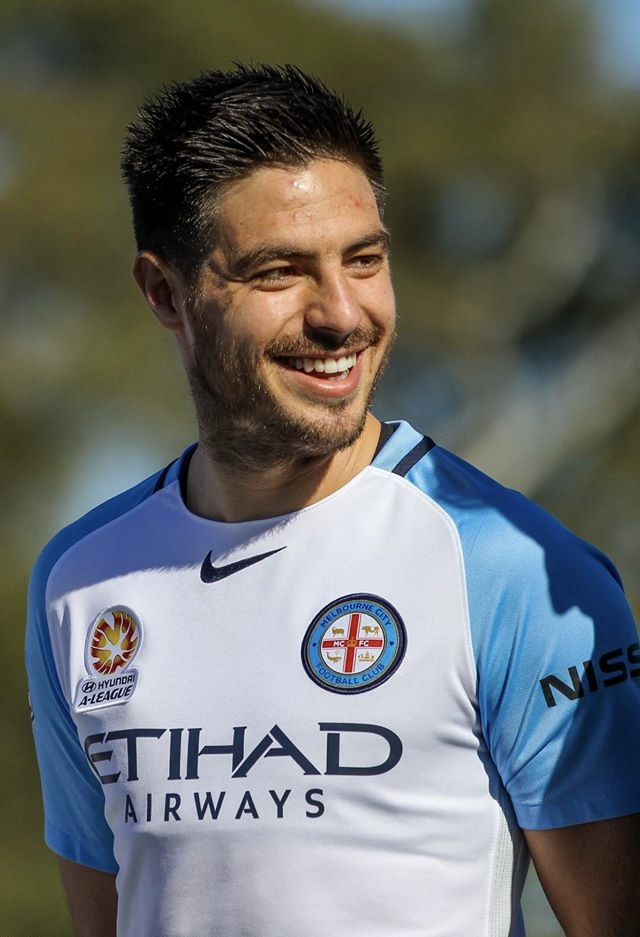
Bruno Fornaroli was Melbourne City's record goalscorer until it was overtaken by Jamie Maclaren in May 2021.

Melbourne City Football Club, an association football club based in Cranbourne East, Melbourne, was founded in 2009 as Melbourne Heart. They became the second Victorian member admitted into the A-League Men in 2010 after their local rivals Melbourne Victory.

Curtis Good holds the record for the greatest number of appearances for Melbourne City. Between 2011 and 2024, the Australian defender played 180 times for the club. The club's goalscoring record is held by Jamie Maclaren, who has scored 115 goals in all competitions between 2019 and 2024. He surpassed the previous record of 57 goals, held by Bruno Fornaroli in 2021.

== Key ==
- The list is ordered first by date of debut, and then if necessary in alphabetical order.
- Appearances as a substitute are included.
- Statistics are correct up to and including the match played on 6 December 2024. Where a player left the club permanently after this date, his statistics are updated to his date of leaving.

Positions key
GK	Goalkeeper
DF	Defender
MF	Midfielder
FW	Forward

Nationality
Unless otherwise noted, the nationality of a player is determined by the country/countries which he has played for, or if said person has not played international football, their country of birth.
Position
Playing positions are listed according to the tactical formations that were employed at the time.
Club career
Club career is defined as the first and last calendar years in which the player appeared for the club in any of the competitions listed below.
Total appearances and Total goals
Total appearances and goals comprise those in the A-League Men regular season and finals series, Australia Cup and AFC Champions League.

== Players ==
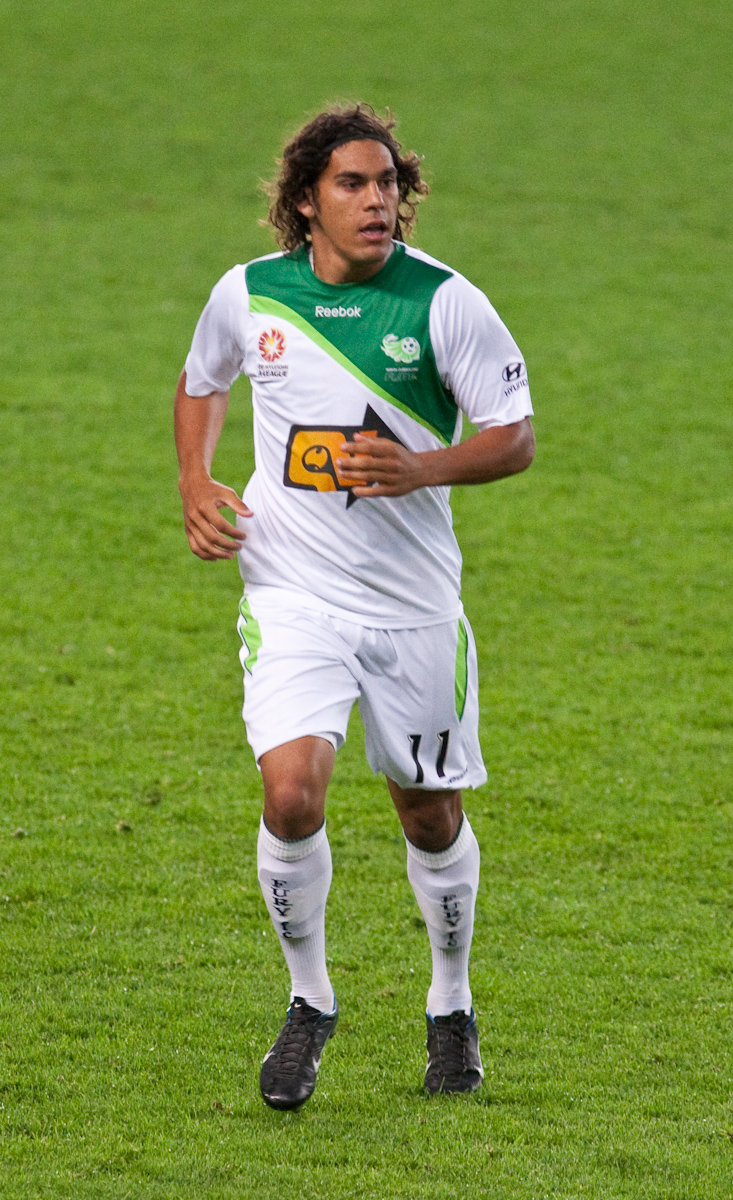
David Williams has the second most appearances for Melbourne City playing 103 times.

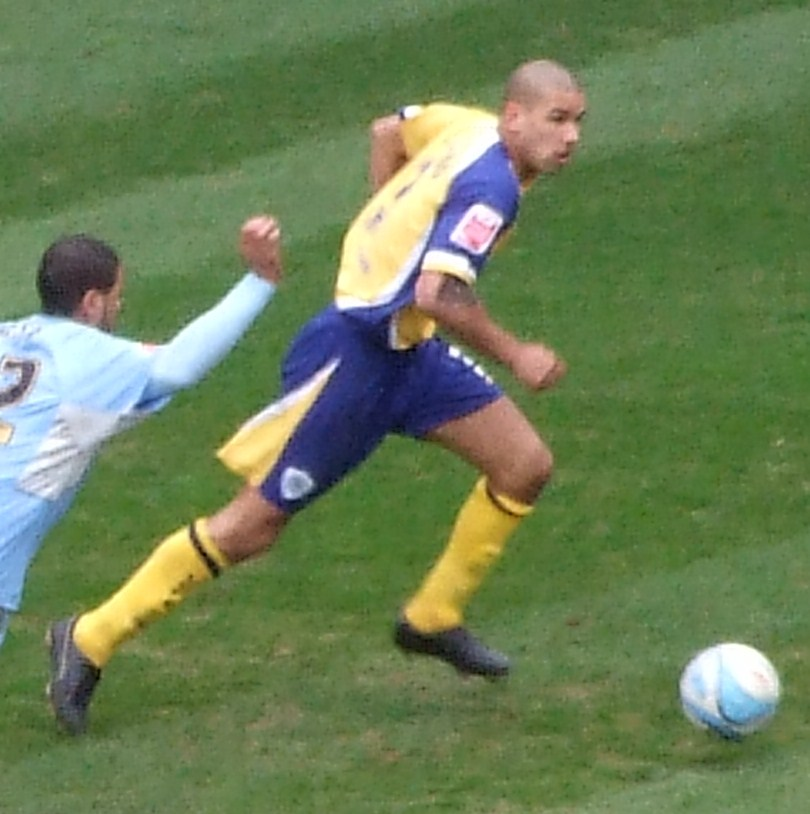
Patrick Kisnorbo made 81 appearances for Melbourne City and managed the club from 2020 to 2022.

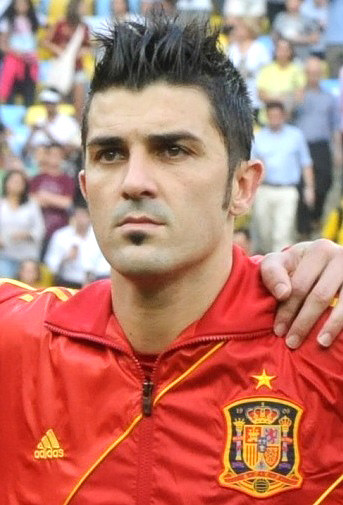
Spanish international forward David Villa made four appearances for the club in 2014.

List of Melbourne City FC players
Player	Nationality	Pos	Club career	Starts	Subs	Total	Goals
Player	Nationality	Pos	Club career	Appearances			Goals
Michael Beauchamp	Australia	DF	2010–2011	19	4	23	0
Eli Babalj	Australia	FW	2010–2013	24	20	44	12
Aziz Behich	Australia	DF	2010–2014; 2023–2024; 2024–	107	6	113	3
Clint Bolton	Australia	GK	2010–2013	70	0	70	0
Simon Colosimo	Australia	DF	2010–2013	56	7	63	1
Brendan Hamill	Australia	DF	2010–2012	23	12	35	1
Dean Heffernan	Australia	DF	2010–2011	9	4	13	0
Nick Kalmar	Australia	MF	2010–2014	35	35	70	7
Michael Marrone	Australia	DF	2010–2013	70	0	70	0
Gerald Sibon	Australia	FW	2010–2011	24	3	27	7
Josip Skoko	Australia	MF	2010–2011	21	2	22	0
Alex Terra	Brazil	FW	2010–2012	25	18	43	7
Matt Thompson	Australia	DF	2010–2013	81	1	82	7
Rutger Worm	Netherlands	FW	2010–2012	36	10	46	2
Wayne Srhoj	Australia	MF	2010–2012	42	1	43	0
Jason Hoffman	Australia	MF	2010–2015	51	30	81	3
Kliment Taseski	Australia	MF	2010–2012	0	4	4	0
John Aloisi	Australia	FW	2010–2011	17	3	20	8
Kamal Ibrahim	Australia	FW	2010–2012	1	2	3	0
Adrian Zahra	Australia	MF	2010–2012	17	2	19	2
Kristian Sarkies	Australia	MF	2010–2012	7	4	11	2
Mate Dugandzic	Australia	FW	2011–2012	67	9	76	13
Fred	Brazil	MF	2011–2013	33	5	38	3
Jonathan Germano	Argentina	MF	2011–2015	49	8	57	7
Curtis Good	Australia	DF	2011–2012; 2018–2024	169	11	180	9
Maycon	Brazil	FW	2011–2012	5	8	13	1
Nikola Roganovic	Australia	GK	2011–2012	2	0	2	0
David Williams	Australia	FW	2011–2016	66	37	103	21
Adrian Madaschi	Australia	DF	2011–2012	8	1	9	0
Craig Goodwin	Australia	DF	2012	3	1	4	0
Paul Reid	Australia	MF	2012	2	2	4	0
Richard Garcia	Australia	FW	2012–2013	24	0	24	6
Patrick Gerhardt	Liberia	DF	2012–2014	34	6	40	1
Dylan Macallister	Australia	FW	2012–2014	5	16	21	1
Josip Tadic	Croatia	FW	2012–2013	19	3	22	6
David Vrankovic	Australia	DF	2012–2014	9	5	14	0
Ben Garuccio	Australia	DF	2012–2014; 2020–2021	42	26	68	1
Sam Mitchinson	Australia	MF	2012–2014	8	1	9	0
Jeremy Walker	Australia	MF	2012–2014	16	0	16	0
Golgol Mebrahtu	Australia	FW	2012–2014	10	16	26	4
Steven Gray	Ireland	DF	2012	1	0	1	0
Ersin Kaya	Australia	DF	2012	0	1	1	0
Andrew Redmayne	Australia	GK	2012–2015	48	1	49	0
Stefan Mauk	Australia	MF	2013–2016; 2017–2018	39	25	64	10
Vince Grella	Australia	MF	2013	0	1	1	0
Jamie Coyne	Australia	MF	2013–2014	7	0	7	0
Marcel Meeuwis	Netherlands	MF	2013	3	3	6	0
Harry Kewell	Australia	FW	2013–2014	11	5	16	2
Patrick Kisnorbo	Australia	DF	2013–2016	79	2	81	5
Massimo Murdocca	Australia	MF	2013–2015	34	11	45	0
Iain Ramsay	Philippines	MF	2013–2015	32	15	47	3
Rob Wielaert	Netherlands	DF	2013–2015	38	0	38	1
Andrea Migliorini	Italy	MF	2013–2014	7	1	8	3
Michael Mifsud	Malta	FW	2013–2014	12	2	14	1
Paulo Retre	Australia	MF	2013–2017	33	27	60	1
Orlando Engelaar	Netherlands	MF	2013–2014	11	1	12	5
Ross Archibald	Australia	DF	2014–2015	3	1	4	0
Tando Velaphi	Australia	GK	2013–2016	26	0	26	0
James Brown	Australia	MF	2014–2016	5	12	17	1
Damien Duff	Ireland	FW	2014–2015	15	1	16	1
Aaron Mooy	Australia	MF	2014–2016	57	1	58	24
Marc Marino	Australia	FW	2014–2016	0	9	9	2
Erik Paartalu	Australia	MF	2014–2016	43	0	43	7
David Villa	Spain	FW	2014	3	1	4	2
Jacob Melling	Australia	MF	2014–2016	27	10	37	1
Liam Miller	Ireland	MF	2014	2	0	2	0
Connor Chapman	Australia	DF	2014–2016	38	4	42	1
Robert Koren	Slovenia	MF	2014–2016	23	5	28	4
Jack Clisby	Australia	DF	2015–2016	27	9	36	0
Safuwan Baharudin	Singapore	DF	2015	6	0	6	2
Joshua Kennedy	Australia	FW	2015	11	1	12	2
Kew Jaliens	Netherlands	FW	2015	11	1	12	2
Harry Novillo	Martinique	FW	2015–2016	30	3	33	13
Nick Symeoy	Australia	DF	2015	0	2	2	0
Wade Dekker	Australia	FW	2015–2016	5	4	9	2
Ali Eyigun	Australia	FW	2015–2016	1	1	2	0
Philip Petreski	Macedonia	MF	2015	0	1	1	0
Stefan Zinni	Australia	FW	2015–2016	3	4	7	0
Michael Zullo	Australia	DF	2015–2016	13	4	17	0
Bruno Fornaroli	Uruguay	FW	2015–2019	81	2	83	57
Hernan Espindola	Australia	FW	2015–2016	2	3	5	0
Jason Trifiro	Australia	MF	2015–2016	1	7	8	0
Steve Kuzmanovski	Australia	FW	2015–2017	4	4	8	0
Thomas Sørensen	Denmark	GK	2015–2017	39	2	41	0
Matthew Millar	Australia	DF	2015–2016	3	2	5	1
Corey Gameiro	Australia	FW	2015–2016	2	3	5	1
Aaron Hughes	Northern Ireland	DF	2015–2016	2	3	5	1
Ivan Franjic	Australia	DF	2015–2017	38	3	41	1
Anthony Caceres	Australia	MF	2015–2017; 2018	29	20	49	4
Nick Fitzgerald	Australia	FW	2016–2018	41	30	71	10
Osama Malik	Australia	DF	2016–2019	58	7	65	0
Alex Wilkinson	Australia	DF	2016	10	0	10	0
Dean Bouzanis	Australia	GK	2016–2020	64	2	66	0
Daniel Arzani	Australia	MF	2016–2018	16	11	27	2
Fernando Brandán	Argentina	MF	2016–2017	16	8	24	5
Luke Brattan	Australia	MF	2016–2019	82	8	90	7
Bruce Kamau	Australia	FW	2016–2018	36	12	38	4
Manny Muscat	Malta	DF	2016–2018	31	12	43	1
Tim Cahill	Australia	FW	2016–2017	22	11	33	13
Bradley Clarke	Australia	DF	2016	0	1	1	0
Neil Kilkenny	Australia	MF	2016–2018	32	3	35	2
Josh Rose	Australia	DF	2016–2017	26	0	26	0
Nicolás Colazo	Argentina	FW	2016–2017	19	5	24	4
Michael Jakobsen	Denmark	DF	2016–2018	49	0	49	3
Christian Cavallo	Australia	DF	2016	0	1	1	0
Ruon Tongyik	Australia	DF	2016–2017	14	3	17	0
Denis Genreau	Australia	MF	2016–2020	6	8	14	1
Braedyn Crowley	Australia	FW	2016–2018	0	5	5	0
Dylan Pierias	Australia	DF	2017–2019	1	2	3	0
Nathaniel Atkinson	Australia	DF	2017–2020; 2020–2021; 2024–	64	22	86	4
Scott Jamieson	Australia	DF	2017–2023	141	20	161	3
Bart Schenkeveld	Australia	DF	2017–2019	57	0	57	1
Eugene Galekovic	Australia	GK	2017–2019	39	0	39	0
Iacopo La Rocca	Italy	DF	2017–2019	19	2	21	0
Marcin Budzinski	Poland	MF	2017–2018	8	9	17	5
Ross McCormack	Scotland	FW	2017–2018	14	3	17	14
Harrison Delbridge	Australia	DF	2017–2020	57	11	68	1
Dario Vidošić	Australia	MF	2017–2019	26	6	34	8
Connor Metcalfe	Australia	DF	2017–2022	66	18	84	11
Oliver Bozanic	Australia	MF	2018	9	0	9	0
Rostyn Griffiths	Australia	MF	2018–2022	74	20	94	4
Anthony Lesiotis	Australia	MF	2018–2019; 2021–2022	1	6	7	0
Riley McGree	Australia	MF	2018–2019	21	9	30	8
Michael O'Halloran	Scotland	FW	2018–2019	0	3	3	0
Lachlan Wales	Australia	FW	2018–2020	34	25	59	3
Ritchie De Laet	Belgium	DF	2018–2019	25	1	26	7
Kearyn Baccus	Australia	MF	2018–2019	26	1	27	0
Florin Berenguer	France	MF	2018–2023	93	22	115	9
Ramy Najjarine	Australia	MF	2018–2020	4	21	25	1
Moudi Najjar	Australia	FW	2019–2020	2	6	8	1
Shayon Harrison	England	FW	2019	11	0	11	4
Jamie Maclaren	Australia	FW	2019–2024	155	9	164	115
Idrus Abdulahi	Australia	MF	2019–2020	0	2	2	0
James Delianov	Australia	GK	2019	1	0	1	0
Joshua Brillante	Australia	MF	2019–2020	32	1	33	1
Javier Cabrera	Uruguay	FW	2019–2020	9	4	13	2
Scott Galloway	Australia	DF	2019–	62	44	106	7
Adrián Luna	Uruguay	MF	2019–2021	40	14	54	8
Craig Noone	England	FW	2019–2021	53	2	55	15
Richard Windbichler	Austria	DF	2019–2020	7	3	10	0
Stefan Colakovski	North Macedonia	MF	2019–2022	11	43	54	4
Tom Glover	Australia	GK	2019–2023	109	0	109	0
Markel Susaeta	Spain	FW	2020	9	1	10	2
Jack Hendry	Scotland	DF	2020	2	0	2	0
Raphael Borges Rodrigues	Australia	FW	2020–2023	6	11	17	2
Andrew Nabbout	Australia	FW	2020–	72	24	96	15
Aiden O'Neill	Australia	MF	2020–2023	61	3	64	4
Naoki Tsubaki	Japan	MF	2020–2021	8	7	15	1
Taras Gomulka	Australia	MF	2020–2023	22	21	43	0
Kerrin Stokes	Australia	DF	2021–2022	9	2	11	0
Alec Mills	Australia	DF	2021	0	3	3	0
Marco Tilio	Australia	FW	2021–2023; 2024–	63	31	94	22
Nuno Reis	Portugal	DF	2021–2024	75	19	94	0
Daniel Georgievski	North Macedonia	DF	2021	1	2	3	0
Matt Sutton	Australia	GK	2021–2022	3	0	3	0
Max Caputo	Australia	FW	2021–	8	25	34	4
Jordan Bos	Australia	DF	2021–2023	41	11	52	3
Mathew Leckie	Australia	FW	2021–	54	15	69	19
Luke Oresti	Australia	MF	2021–2022	1	1	2	1
Manuel Pucciarelli	Italy	MF	2021–2022	2	4	6	0
Jordon Hall	Australia	DF	2022–2024	8	7	15	0
Carl Jenkinson	England	DF	2022	23	5	28	3
Tsubasa Endoh	Japan	MF	2022	3	6	9	0
Jordi Valadon	Australia	MF	2022	0	4	4	0
Callum Talbot	Australia	DF	2022–	55	12	67	1
Valon Berisha	Kosovo	MF	2022–2023	26	1	27	1
Thomas Lam	Finland	MF	2022–2023	25	2	27	1
Richard van der Venne	Netherlands	MF	2022–2023	17	6	23	7
Terry Antonis	Australia	MF	2023–2024	5	23	28	5
Tolgay Arslan	Germany	MF	2023–2024	34	0	34	19
Marin Jakoliš	Croatia	FW	2023–2024	31	3	34	3
Alessandro Lopane	Australia	MF	2023–	17	17	34	3
Steven Ugarkovic	Australia	MF	2023–	39	4	43	6
Jamie Young	England	GK	2023–	38	0	38	0
Hamza Sakhi	Morocco	MF	2023–2024	21	1	22	1
Zane Schreiber	Australia	MF	2023–	4	11	15	1
Samuel Souprayen	France	DF	2023–	34	2	36	2
Medin Memeti	Australia	FW	2023–	2	4	6	1
Harrison Shillington	Australia	DF	2023–	0	1	1	0
Harry Politidis	Australia	DF	2023–	6	17	23	1
Léo Natel	Brazil	FW	2023–2024	23	6	29	6
Benjamin Mazzeo	Australia	FW	2023–	3	10	13	2
Jimmy Jeggo	Australia	MF	2024–	15	3	18	0
Vicente Fernández	Chile	DF	2024	11	1	12	0
Benjamin Dunbar	Australia	MF	2024–	0	3	3	0
Germán Ferreyra	Argentina	DF	2024–	1	4	5	0
James Nieuwenhuizen	Australia	GK	2024–	1	0	1	0
Arion Sulemani	Australia	DF	2024–	1	3	4	0
Kai Trewin	Australia	DF	2024–	7	0	7	0
Lawrence Wong	Australia	MF	2024–	0	1	1	0
Patrick Beach	Australia	GK	2024–	6	0	6	0
Yonatan Cohen	Israel	FW	2024–	5	1	6	3
Andreas Kuen	Austria	MF	2024–	4	1	5	2
Kavian Rahmani	Austria	MF	2024–	0	3	3	0

== Captains ==
Eight players have captained Melbourne City since it was founded as Melbourne Heart in 2009, first being Simon Colosimo, who captained the team until the end of their inaugural season in 2011. The club's longest-serving captain is Scott Jamieson, who captained the club for five years between 2018 and 2023.

Dates	Captain
2010–11	Simon Colosimo (AUS)
2011–13	Fred (BRA)
2013–14	Harry Kewell (AUS)
2014–16	Patrick Kisnorbo (AUS)
2016–17	Bruno Fornaroli (URU)
2017–18	Michael Jakobsen (DEN)
2018–23	Scott Jamieson (AUS)
2023–24	Jamie Maclaren (AUS)
2024–present	Aziz Behich (AUS)
