= 2013–14 Melbourne Heart FC season =

Melbourne Heart
2013–14 season
- Chairman: Peter Sidwell
- Manager: John Aloisi (until 28 December 2013); John van 't Schip (from 30 December 2013)
- Stadium: AAMI Park
- A-League: 10th
- Top goalscorer: David Williams (12)
Home colours	Away colours

The 2013–14 Melbourne Heart FC season was the club's fourth since its establishment in 2009. The club participated in the A-League for the fourth time. This season was the club's last season under the "Melbourne Heart" name. After being taken over and rebranded by Manchester City, from mid-2014 onwards, the club was to be called "Melbourne City FC".

== Players ==
=== Squad information ===
N	Pos.	Nat.	Name	Age	Since	App	Goals	Ends	Transfer fee	Notes
1	GK	(Australia)	Andrew Redmayne	37	2012	32	0	2016	Free	
2	DF	(Australia)	Jeremy Walker	33	2011	16	0	2014	Youth system	
3	DF	(Netherlands)	Rob Wielaert	47	2013	19	0	2014	Free	Visa player
4	MF	(Netherlands)	Orlando Engelaar	46	2013	4	1	2014	Free	International marquee
5	DF	(Australia)	Sam Mitchinson	33	2012	10	0	2014	Youth system	
6	DF	(Liberia)	Patrick Gerhardt	40	2012	38	1	2014	Free	Visa player
7	MF	(Australia)	Iain Ramsay	38	2013	18	1	2014	Free	
8	MF	(Australia)	Massimo Murdocca	41	2013	19	0	2015	Free	
10	MF	(Australia)	Harry Kewell (captain)	47	2013	11	1	2014	Free	
13	MF	(Argentina)	Jonatan Germano	38	2011	38	5	2014	Free	Visa player
15	FW	(Australia)	David Williams	38	2011	57	15	2014	Free	Domestic marquee
16	DF	(Australia)	Aziz Behich	35	2010	84	1	2014	Free	
17	MF	(Australia)	Jason Hoffman	37	2010	58	1	2014	Free	
18	DF	(Australia)	David Vranković	32	2012	13	0	2014	Free	
19	MF	(Australia)	Ben Garuccio	30	2012	9	0	2015	Free	
20	GK	(Australia)	Tando Velaphi	39	2013	0	0	2014	Free	
21	MF	(Australia)	Stefan Mauk	30	2012	10	0	2014	Youth system	
22	MF	(Australia)	Nick Kalmar	38	2010	63	6	2014	Free	
23	FW	(Australia)	Mate Dugandžić	36	2011	48	9	2014	Free	
24	DF	(Australia)	Patrick Kisnorbo	45	2013	13	2	2014	Free	
25	MF	(Italy)	Andrea Migliorini	38	2014	9	0	2014	Free	Injury replacement

- Last updated: 18 February 2014

=== From youth squad ===
N	Pos.	Nat.	Name	Age	Notes
26	GK	(Australia)	Marko Stevanja		
27	MF	(Australia)	Luke O'Dea	35	
28	MF	(Australia)	Paulo Retre	33	
29	MF	(Australia)	Alexander Dao		
30	MF	(Australia)	Ross Archibald	31	

=== Transfers in ===
Name	Position	Moving from	Notes
(Australia) Jeremy Walker	Defender	(Australia) Melbourne Heart Youth	1-year contract
(Australia) Sam Mitchinson	Defender	(Australia) Melbourne Heart Youth	1-year contract
(Australia) Stefan Mauk	Midfielder	(Australia) Melbourne Heart Youth	1-year contract
(Australia) Iain Ramsay	Midfielder	(Australia) Adelaide United	1-year contract
(Australia) Massimo Murdocca	Midfielder	(Australia) Brisbane Roar	2-year contract
(Australia) Harry Kewell	Midfielder	(Qatar) Al-Gharafa	1-year contract
(Netherlands) Rob Wielaert	Defender	(Netherlands) Roda JC Kerkrade	1-year contract
(Australia) Aziz Behich	Defender	(Turkey) Bursaspor	1-year loan
(Australia) Tando Velaphi	Goalkeeper	(Australia) Melbourne Victory	1-year contract
(Netherlands) Orlando Engelaar	Midfielder	(Netherlands) PSV Eindhoven	1-year contract
(Australia) Patrick Kisnorbo	Defender	(England) Leeds United	1-year contract
(Malta) Michael Mifsud	Striker	(Malta) Valletta	1-year contract
(Italy) Andrea Migliorini	Midfielder	(Slovenia) Koper	3-month injury replacement
(Australia) Luke O'Dea	Midfielder	(Australia) Melbourne Victory	Youth player

=== Transfers out ===
Name	Position	Moving to	Notes
(Australia) Vince Grella	Midfielder	Retired	Retired
(Republic of Ireland) Steven Gray	Defender	Free agent	Released
(Australia) Matt Thompson	Midfielder	(Australia) Sydney FC	Released
(Australia) Clint Bolton	Goalkeeper	Retired	Released
(Brazil) Fred	Midfielder	Free agent	Released
(Australia) Simon Colosimo	Defender	(India) Dempo	Released
(Australia) Cameron Edwards	Midfielder	(Australia) Perth Glory	Released
(Australia) Jamie Coyne	Defender	Free agent	Released
(Netherlands) Marcel Meeuwis	Midfielder	(Netherlands) FC Eindhoven	Released
(Croatia) Josip Tadić	Striker	(Croatia) HNK Rijeka	Released
(Australia) Eli Babalj	Striker	(Netherlands) AZ Alkmaar	Transfer
(Australia) Richard Garcia	Midfielder	(Australia) Sydney FC	Released
(Australia) Dylan Macallister	Forward	(Hong Kong) Eastern Salon	Released
(Australia) Golgol Mebrahtu	Forward	Free agent	Released
(Malta) Michael Mifsud	Forward	Free agent	Released

== Technical staff ==
Position	Name
Manager	(Netherlands) John van 't Schip
Assistant manager	(Spain) Gerard Nus
Goalkeeping coach	(Australia) Peter Zoïs
Strength & Conditioning Coach	(Australia)
Physiotherapist	(Australia) Belinda Pacella

== Statistics ==
=== Squad statistics ===
N	Pos.	Nat.	Name	Total					A-League
N	Pos.	Nat.	Name	Apps	Goals	Yellow card	Second yellow card	Red card	Apps	Goals	Yellow card	Second yellow card	Red card
1	GK	(Australia)	Andrew Redmayne	24	0	2	0	0	24	0	2	0	0
2	DF	(Australia)	Jeremy Walker	3	0	0	0	0	3	0	0	0	0
3	DF	(Netherlands)	Rob Wielaert	26	0	7	0	0	26	0	7	0	0
4	MF	(Netherlands)	Orlando Engelaar	12	5	1	0	1	11+ 1	5	1	0	1
5	DF	(Australia)	Sam Mitchinson	0	0	0	0	0	0	0	0	0	0
6	DF	(Liberia)	Patrick Gerhardt	17	0	5	0	0	11+ 6	0	5	0	0
7	MF	(Australia)	Iain Ramsay	26	1	5	0	0	20+ 6	1	5	0	0
8	MF	(Australia)	Massimo Murdocca	27	0	3	0	0	26+ 1	0	3	0	0
9	FW	(Australia)	Dylan Macallister	1	0	0	1	0	0+ 1	0	0	1	0
10	MF	(Australia)	Harry Kewell	16	2	2	0	0	11+ 5	2	2	0	0
11	FW	(Malta)	Michael Mifsud	14	1	2	0	0	12+ 2	1	2	0	0
13	MF	(Argentina)	Jonatan Germano	10	2	4	0	0	8+ 2	2	4	0	0
14	FW	(Australia)	Golgol Mebrahtu	12	0	0	0	0	6+ 6	0	0	0	0
15	FW	(Australia)	David Williams	26	12	4	0	0	22+ 4	12	4	0	0
16	DF	(Australia)	Aziz Behich	24	1	6	0	0	23+ 1	1	6	0	0
17	MF	(Australia)	Jason Hoffman	22	1	4	0	0	22	1	4	0	0
18	DF	(Australia)	David Vranković	0	0	0	0	0	0	0	0	0	0
19	MF	(Australia)	Ben Garuccio	12	0	2	0	0	6+ 6	0	2	0	0
20	GK	(Australia)	Tando Velaphi	3	0	1	0	0	3	0	1	0	0
21	MF	(Australia)	Stefan Mauk	16	0	2	0	0	3+13	0	2	0	0
22	MF	(Australia)	Nick Kalmar	20	1	1	0	0	7+13	1	1	0	0
23	FW	(Australia)	Mate Dugandžić	26	4	3	0	0	23+ 3	4	3	0	0
24	DF	(Australia)	Patrick Kisnorbo	21	2	5	0	1	20+ 1	2	5	0	1
25	MF	(Italy)	Andrea Migliorini	9	3	2	0	0	8+ 1	3	2	0	0
28	MF	(Australia)	Paulo Retre	4	0	0	0	0	2+ 2	0	0	0	0
30	MF	(Australia)	Ross Archibald	1	0	0	0	0	0+ 1	0	0	0	0

- Last updated: 28 March 2014
- Source: espnfc.com
- (yellow card) = Number of bookings; (second yellow card) = Number of sending offs after a second yellow card; (red card) = Number of sending offs by a direct red card.

=== Goal scorers ===
Total	Player		Goals per Game																										
Total	Player		1	2	3	4	5	6	7	8	9	10	11	12	13	14	15	16	17	18	19	20	21	22	23	24	25	26	27
12	(Australia)	David Williams		2						1	1								1	1	3		1		1			1	
5	(Netherlands)	Orlando Engelaar																			1	1	1			1			1
4	(Australia)	Mate Dugandžić															2						1					1	
3	(Italy)	Andrea Migliorini							1	2																			
2	(Australia)	Patrick Kisnorbo																1		1									
2	(Australia)	Harry Kewell																1					1						
2	(Argentina)	Jonatan Germano																	1						1				
1	(Malta)	Michael Mifsud										1																	
1	(Australia)	Nick Kalmar											1																
1	(Australia)	Iain Ramsay															1												
1	(Australia)	Aziz Behich																									1		
1	(Australia)	Jason Hoffman																											1
1	Goal	Own goal																			1								
36	TOTAL		0	2	0	0	0	0	1	3	1	1	1	0	0	0	3	2	2	2	5	1	4	0	2	1	1	2	2

A goal was scored from a penalty kick
2 were scored from penalty kicks

=== Home attendance ===
Round	Opponent	Attendance
2	Central Coast Mariners	8,734
5	Western Sydney Wanderers	8,070
6	Sydney FC	8,941
8	Adelaide United	6,002
10	Melbourne Victory	26,491
12	Wellington Phoenix	6,486
15	Newcastle Jets	5,046
17	Sydney FC	7,674
18	Perth Glory	7,218
20	Brisbane Roar	7,816
21	Melbourne Victory	25,546
23	Wellington Phoenix	5,614
24	Central Coast Mariners	5,480
26	Western Sydney Wanderers	10,003
Total Attendance		139,121
Average Attendance		9,937

== Pre-season and friendlies ==
25 July 2013	GNEFA All Stars (Australia)	1–4	(Australia) Melbourne Heart	Shepparton
20:00	Ellis 37' (pen.)	Report	Mebrahtu 30'; Macallister 35'; Garuccio 51'; Dugandžić 86'	Stadium: McEwan Reserve; Attendance: 2800; Referee: Brenton Hayward

7 August 2013 friendly	Melbourne Heart (Australia)	12–0	(Australia) La Trobe University XI	Melbourne
15:00	Williams 10', 12', 14', 18', 38'; Macallister 11', 65', 67', 90'; Konstantinidis 21', 33'; Ramsay 85'	Report		Stadium: Epping Stadium

16 August 2013	Richmond (Australia)	0–4	(Australia) Melbourne Heart	Melbourne
19:30		Report	Ramsay 3'; Dugandzic 4'; Mebrahtu 17'; Kewell 23' (pen.)	Stadium: Kevin Bartlett Reserve

25 August 2013	Brisbane Roar (Australia)	3–0	(Australia) Melbourne Heart	Lismore
14:30	Berisha 1', 66', 83'	Report		Stadium: Oakes Oval; Attendance: 5,138

4 September 2013	Oakleigh Cannons (Australia)	0–1	(Australia) Melbourne Heart	Melbourne
19:30		Report	Vranković 75'	Stadium: Kingston Heath Soccer Complex

11 September 2013	Perth Glory (Australia)	1–0	(Australia) Melbourne Heart	Perth
17:30 EST	Maclaren 9'	Report		Stadium: Intiga Stadium

14 September 2013	Perth Glory (Australia)	1–1	(Australia) Melbourne Heart	Mandurah
Saturday 15:00 AWST	McGarry 88'	Report	Kewell 84'	Stadium: Hyundai Stadium

27 September 2013	Melbourne Heart (Australia)	1–2	(Australia) Adelaide United	Melbourne
14:30 AEST	Williams 65'	Report	Carrusca 26' (pen.), 33'	Stadium: Epping Stadium

29 September 2013	Peninsula XI (Australia)	1–4	(Australia) Melbourne Heart	Melbourne
15:00	Scott 68'	Report	Kaya 6'; Retre 13', 40' (pen.); Bounis 50'	Stadium: Frankston Park; Attendance: 2,000

== Competitions ==
=== Overall ===
Competition	Started round	Final position / round	First match	Last match
A-League	—	10th	12 October 2013	12 April 2014
National Youth League	—	5th	26 October 2013	2 March 2014

=== A-League ===
==== League table ====
Pos	Team	Pld	W	D	L	GF	GA	GD	Pts	Qualification
1	Brisbane Roar (C)	27	16	4	7	43	25	+18	52	Qualificaition for 2015 AFC Champions League group stage and finals series
2	Western Sydney Wanderers	27	11	9	7	34	29	+5	42	Qualificaition for 2015 AFC Champions League group stage and finals series
3	Central Coast Mariners	27	12	6	9	33	36	−3	42	Qualification for 2015 AFC Champions League qualifying play-off and finals series (Note: Since the winner of 2014 A-League Grand Final (Brisbane Roar) qualified for the 2015 AFC Champions League group stage, the 2nd and 3rd placed teams qualified for the group stage and the qualifying play-off of 2015 AFC Champions League.)
4	Melbourne Victory	27	11	8	8	42	43	−1	41	Qualification for Finals series
5	Sydney FC	27	12	3	12	40	38	+2	39	Qualification for Finals series
6	Adelaide United	27	10	8	9	45	36	+9	38	Qualification for Finals series
7	Newcastle Jets	27	10	6	11	34	34	0	36	
8	Perth Glory	27	7	7	13	28	37	−9	28	
9	Wellington Phoenix (Note: Wellington Phoenix cannot qualify for the AFC Champions League as they are not recognised as an AFC club.)	27	7	7	13	36	51	−15	28	
10	Melbourne Heart	27	6	8	13	36	42	−6	26	

Updated to match(es) played on 13 April 2014. Source: ultimatealeague.com
Rules for classification: 1) points; 2) goal difference; 3) number of goals scored.
(C) Champions

==== Results summary ====
Overall								Home						Away					
Pld	W	D	L	GF	GA	GD	Pts	W	D	L	GF	GA	GD	W	D	L	GF	GA	GD
27	6	8	13	36	42	−6	26	5	3	6	23	22	+1	1	5	7	13	20	−7

Last updated: 12 April 2014.
Source: Competitive Matches

==== Results by round ====
Round	1	2	3	4	5	6	7	8	9	10	11	12	13	14	15	16	17	18	19	20	21	22	23	24	25	26	27
Ground	A	H	A	A	H	H	A	H	A	A	H	H	A	A	H	A	H	H	A	H	H	A	H	H	A	A	H
Result	D	D	L	L	L	L	L	D	D	L	L	L	D	L	W	D	W	W	W	W	W	L	D	L	L	D	L
Position	6	5	8	10	10	10	10	10	10	10	10	10	10	10	10	10	10	10	10	10	9	9	9	9	9	10	10

Updated to match(es) played on 12 April 2014. Source: Matches
A = Away; H = Home; W = Win; D = Draw; L = Loss

==== Matches ====
12 October 2013 1	Melbourne Victory	0–0	Melbourne Heart	Melbourne
Saturday 19:45 AEDT		Report		Stadium: Etihad Stadium; Attendance: 45,202; Referee: Peter Green

19 October 2013 2	Melbourne Heart	2–2	Central Coast Mariners	Melbourne
Saturday 17:30 AEDT	Williams 53', 59'	Report	Flores 70' (pen.), 76' (pen.)	Stadium: AAMI Park; Attendance: 8,734; Referee: Ben Williams

27 October 2013 3	Perth Glory	1–0	Melbourne Heart	Perth
Sunday 14:00 AWST	Maclaren 51'	Report		Stadium: nib Stadium; Attendance: 13,856; Referee: Kris Griffiths-Jones

3 November 2013 4	Brisbane Roar	3–0	Melbourne Heart	Brisbane
Sunday 16:00 AEST	Henrique 48', 65'; Smith 77'	Report		Stadium: Suncorp Stadium; Attendance: 15,011; Referee: Lucien Laverdure

8 November 2013 5	Melbourne Heart	0–1	Western Sydney Wanderers	Melbourne
Friday 19:30 AEDT		Report	Cole 27'	Stadium: AAMI Park; Attendance: 8,070; Referee: Peter O'Leary

15 November 2013 6	Melbourne Heart	0–2	Sydney FC	Melbourne
Friday 19:30 AEDT		Report	Del Piero 26' (pen.); Chianese 45+1'	Stadium: AAMI Park; Attendance: 8,941; Referee: Alan Milliner

24 November 2013 7	Newcastle Jets	3–1	Melbourne Heart	Newcastle
Sunday 17:00 AEDT	Taggart 38', 55', 62'	Report	Migliorini 57'	Stadium: Hunter Stadium; Attendance: 12,806; Referee: Peter Green

1 December 2013 8	Melbourne Heart	3–3	Adelaide United	Melbourne
Sunday 17:00 AEDT	Migliorini 54', 66'; Williams 71' (pen.)	Report	Lustica 4'; Cirio 15'; Carrusca 77'	Stadium: AAMI Park; Attendance: 6,002; Referee: Strebre Delovski

7 December 2013 9	Western Sydney Wanderers	1–1	Melbourne Heart	Sydney
Saturday 17:30 AEDT	Mooy 44'	Report	Williams 38'	Stadium: Pirtek Stadium; Attendance: 14,549; Referee: Kris Griffiths-Jones

15 December 2013 10	Sydney FC	2–1	Melbourne Heart	Sydney
Sunday 17:00 AEDT	Del Piero 43'; Despotović 45+1'	Report	Mifsud 72'	Stadium: Allianz Stadium; Attendance: 16,008; Referee: Chris Beath

21 December 2013 11	Melbourne Heart	1–3	Melbourne Victory	Melbourne
Saturday 19:30 AEDT	Kisnorbo (red card) 21'; Kalmar 81'	Report	Nichols 38', 63'; Troisi 60'	Stadium: AAMI Park; Attendance: 26,491; Referee: Ben Williams

27 December 2013 12	Melbourne Heart	0–1	Wellington Phoenix	Melbourne
Friday 19:30 AEDT		Report	Huysegems 75'	Stadium: AAMI Park; Attendance: 6,486; Referee: Strebre Delovski

5 January 2014 13	Central Coast Mariners	0–0	Melbourne Heart	Gosford
Sunday 17:00 AEDT		Report		Stadium: Bluetongue Stadium; Attendance: 8,062; Referee: Jarred Gillett

10 January 2014 14	Perth Glory	3–0	Melbourne Heart	Perth
Friday 18:45 AWST	Zahra 64'; Smeltz 86', 89'	Report	Macallister (yellow card) 75' (red card) 81'	Stadium: nib Stadium; Attendance: 9,045; Referee: Peter Green

17 January 2014 15	Melbourne Heart	3–1	Newcastle Jets	Melbourne
Friday 19:30 AEDT	Ramsay 44'; Dugandžić 45+1', 68'	Report	Regan 37'	Stadium: AAMI Park; Attendance: 5,046; Referee: Alan Milliner

25 January 2014 16	Adelaide United	2–2	Melbourne Heart	Adelaide
Saturday 17:00 ACDT	Djite 22'; Ry. Griffiths 90'	Report	Kewell 61' (pen.); Kisnorbo 78'	Stadium: Coopers Stadium; Attendance: 11,100; Referee: Kris Griffiths-Jones

31 January 2014 17	Melbourne Heart	2–1	Sydney FC	Melbourne
Friday 19:30 AEDT	Engelaar (red card) 33'; Germano 52'; Williams 89'	Report	Gameiro 39'	Stadium: AAMI Park; Attendance: 7,674; Referee: Jarred Gillett

9 February 2014 18	Melbourne Heart	2–1	Perth Glory	Albury
Sunday 17:00 AEDT	Kisnorbo 51'; Williams 81'	Report	McGarry 73'	Stadium: Lavington Sports Ground; Attendance: 7,218; Referee: Lucien Laverdure

16 February 2014 19	Wellington Phoenix	0–5	Melbourne Heart	Wellington
Sunday 17:00 NZDT		Report	Engelaar 9'; Williams 19', 51', 63'; Moss 54' (o.g.)	Stadium: Westpac Stadium; Attendance: 9,767; Referee: Jarred Gillett

23 February 2014 20	Melbourne Heart	1–0	Brisbane Roar	Melbourne
Sunday 17:00 AEDT	Engelaar 61'	Report		Stadium: AAMI Park; Attendance: 7,816; Referee: Adam Kersey

1 March 2014 21	Melbourne Heart	4–0	Melbourne Victory	Melbourne
Saturday 19:30 AEDT	Engelaar 9'; Dugandžić 15'; Williams 83'; Kewell 86'	Report	Ansell (red card) 41'	Stadium: AAMI Park; Attendance: 25,546; Referee: Strebre Delovski

8 March 2014 22	Newcastle Jets	1–0	Melbourne Heart	Newcastle
Saturday 17:30 AEDT	Taggart 53'	Report		Stadium: Hunter Stadium; Attendance: 10,117; Referee: Adam Kersey

16 March 2014 23	Melbourne Heart	2–2	Wellington Phoenix	Melbourne
Sunday 19:00 AEDT	Germano 29'; Williams 62' (pen.)	Report	Krishna 6'; Sigmund (yellow card) 31' (red card) 33'; Boyd 56'	Stadium: AAMI Park; Attendance: 5,614; Referee: Ben Williams

23 March 2014 24	Melbourne Heart	1–2	Central Coast Mariners	Melbourne
Sunday 15:00 AEDT	Engelaar 34'	Report	Kim 45+2'; Ibini 77'	Stadium: AAMI Park; Attendance: 5,480; Referee: Hiroyuki Kimura (Japan)

28 March 2014 25	Brisbane Roar	2–1	Melbourne Heart	Brisbane
Friday 19:00 AEST	Petratos 36'; Berisha (red card) 43'; Henrique 73'		Behich 18'	Stadium: Suncorp Stadium; Attendance: 10,101; Referee: Chris Beath

4 April 2014 26	Adelaide United	2–2	Melbourne Heart	Adelaide
Friday 19:00 AEDT	Carrusca 1'; Elrich (red card) 35'; Ferreira 90+3'		Williams 33' (pen.); Dugandžić 42'	Stadium: Coopers Stadium; Attendance: 13,845; Referee: Ben Williams

12 April 2014 27	Melbourne Heart	2–3	Western Sydney Wanderers	Melbourne
Saturday 17:30 AEDT	Engelaar 34'; Hoffman 72'	Report	Topor-Stanley 27'; Šantalab 81'; Hersi 86'	Stadium: AAMI Park; Attendance: 10,003; Referee: Chris Johansen

== Awards ==
- Player of the Week (Round 8) – Andrea Migliorini
- Player of the Week (Round 15) – Mate Dugandžić
