= 2013–14 A-League =

37th season of top-tier soccer league in Australia

A-League
- Season: 2013–14
- Dates: 11 October 2013 – 4 May 2014
- Champions: Brisbane Roar (3rd title)
- Premiers: Brisbane Roar (2nd title)
- Champions League: Brisbane Roar; Western Sydney Wanderers; Central Coast Mariners
- Matches: 135
- Goals: 371 (2.75 per match)
- Top goalscorer: Adam Taggart (16 goals)
- Best goalkeeper: Eugene Galekovic
- Biggest home win: Wellington Phoenix 5–0 Melbourne Victory (18 January 2014); Newcastle Jets 5–0 Wellington Phoenix (22 March 2014)
- Biggest away win: Melbourne Victory 0–5 Sydney FC (26 January 2014); Wellington Phoenix 0–5 Melbourne Heart (16 February 2014)
- Highest scoring: Sydney FC 2–5 Brisbane Roar (26 December 2013); Melbourne Victory 4–3 Adelaide United (22 February 2014)
- Longest winning run: Sydney FC, Melbourne Heart (5)
- Longest unbeaten run: Adelaide United, Melbourne Heart (7)
- Longest winless run: Melbourne Heart (14)
- Longest losing run: Melbourne Heart (5)
- Highest attendance: 45,202
- Lowest attendance: 5,046
- Average attendance: 13,041 ( 700)

The 2013–14 A-League was the 37th season of top-flight soccer in Australia, and the ninth of the A-League since its establishment in 2004. The season began on 11 October 2013, with Western Sydney Wanderers as the defending A-League Premiers and Central Coast Mariners as the defending A-League Champions. The regular season concluded on 13 April 2014, with Brisbane Roar crowned Premiers. The 2014 Grand Final took place on 4 May 2014, with Brisbane Roar claiming their third Championship with a 2–1 win in extra time against Western Sydney Wanderers.

This was the first A-League season to be broadcast on free-to-air television, after SBS obtained the rights to a live Friday night game each week of the season, and all finals games on a one-hour delay, on a $160 million four-year broadcast deal.

== Clubs ==

Team	City	Home Ground	Capacity
Adelaide United	Adelaide	Coopers Stadium	17,000
Brisbane Roar	Brisbane	Suncorp Stadium	52,500
Central Coast Mariners	Gosford	Central Coast Stadium	20,119
Melbourne Heart	Melbourne	AAMI Park	30,050
Melbourne Victory	Melbourne	Etihad Stadium; AAMI Park	56,347; 30,050
Newcastle Jets	Newcastle	Hunter Stadium	33,000
Perth Glory	Perth	NIB Stadium	20,500
Sydney FC	Sydney	Allianz Stadium	45,500
Wellington Phoenix	Wellington	Westpac Stadium	36,000
Western Sydney Wanderers	Sydney	Pirtek Stadium	21,487

=== Personnel and kits ===
Team	Manager	Captain	Kit manufacturer	Kit partner
Adelaide United	(Spain) Josep Gombau	(Australia) Eugene Galeković	Kappa	Veolia
Brisbane Roar	(England) Mike Mulvey	(Australia) Matt Smith	Puma	The Coffee Club
Central Coast Mariners	(Australia) Phil Moss	(Malta) John Hutchinson	Kappa	Masterfoods
Melbourne Heart	(Netherlands) John van 't Schip	(Australia) Harry Kewell	Kappa	Westpac
Melbourne Victory	(Australia) Kevin Muscat	(Australia) Mark Milligan	Adidas	Adecco
Newcastle Jets	(Australia) Clayton Zane	(Australia) Ruben Zadkovich	ISC	Hunter Ports
Perth Glory	(England) Kenny Lowe	(Australia) Jacob Burns	Macron	QBE Insurance
Sydney FC	(Australia) Frank Farina	(Italy) Alessandro Del Piero	Adidas	Webjet
Wellington Phoenix	(Scotland) Ernie Merrick	(New Zealand) Andrew Durante	Adidas	Huawei
Western Sydney Wanderers	(Australia) Tony Popovic	(Australia) Michael Beauchamp	Nike	NRMA Insurance

=== Managerial changes ===
Team	Outgoing manager	Manner of departure	Date of vacancy	Table	Incoming manager	Date of appointment
Adelaide United	(Australia) Michael Valkanis (caretaker)	End of caretaker spell	30 April 2013	Pre-season	(Spain) Josep Gombau	30 April 2013
Wellington Phoenix	(England) Chris Greenacre (caretaker)	End of caretaker spell	20 May 2013	Pre-season	(Scotland) Ernie Merrick	20 May 2013
Melbourne Victory	(Australia) Ange Postecoglou	Signed by Australia	31 October 2013	4th	(Australia) Kevin Muscat	31 October 2013
Central Coast Mariners	(Australia) Graham Arnold	Signed by Vegalta Sendai	14 November 2013	5th	(Australia) Phil Moss	14 November 2013
Perth Glory	(Australia) Alistair Edwards	Sacked	17 December 2013	7th	(England) Kenny Lowe (caretaker)	20 December 2013
Melbourne Heart	(Australia) John Aloisi	Sacked	29 December 2013	10th	(Netherlands) John van 't Schip	30 December 2013
Newcastle Jets	(Australia) Gary van Egmond	Mutual termination	20 January 2014	7th	(Australia) Clayton Zane (caretaker)	20 January 2014

=== Foreign players ===
Club	Visa 1	Visa 2	Visa 3	Visa 4	Visa 5	Non-Visa foreigner(s)	Former player(s)
Adelaide United	(Argentina) Marcelo Carrusca	(Argentina) Jerónimo Neumann	(Portugal) Fábio Ferreira	(Spain) Sergio Cirio	(Spain) Isaías	(Brazil) Cássio^{1}	
Brisbane Roar	(Albania) Besart Berisha	(Brazil) Henrique	(Costa Rica) Jean Carlos Solórzano	(Germany) Thomas Broich	(Republic of Ireland) Liam Miller	(Sri Lanka) Jack Hingert^{2}	
Central Coast Mariners	(Argentina) Marcos Flores	(Netherlands) Marcel Seip	(Scotland) Nick Montgomery	(South Korea) Kim Seung-Yong		(Malta) John Hutchinson^{2} (New Zealand) Storm Roux^{2}	(New Zealand) Michael McGlinchey
Melbourne Heart	(Argentina) Jonatan Germano	(Liberia) Patrick Gerhardt	(Netherlands) Orlando Engelaar	(Netherlands) Rob Wielaert		(Philippines) Iain Ramsay^{2}	(Malta) Michael Mifsud
Melbourne Victory	(Brazil) Guilherme Finkler	(Chile) Pablo Contreras	(Ivory Coast) Adama Traore	(New Zealand) Kosta Barbarouses			(Mauritius) Jonathan Bru
Newcastle Jets	(England) Michael Bridges	(England) Emile Heskey	(Netherlands) Kew Jaliens				
Perth Glory	(Brazil) Sidnei	(France) William Gallas	(Lithuania) Darvydas Šernas	(Scotland) Steven McGarry	(Serbia) Nebojša Marinković	(New Zealand) Shane Smeltz^{2}	(Japan) Ryo Nagai
Sydney FC	(Italy) Alessandro Del Piero	(Serbia) Ranko Despotović	(Serbia) Miloš Dimitrijević	(Serbia) Nikola Petković		(Croatia) Vedran Janjetović^{1} (Iraq) Ali Abbas^{1} (Northern Ireland) Terry McFlynn^{1}	(Brazil) Tiago Calvano (Panama) Yairo Yau
Wellington Phoenix	(Barbados) Paul Ifill	(Belgium) Stein Huysegems	(Costa Rica) Kenny Cunningham	(Costa Rica) Carlos Hernández	(Spain) Albert Riera	(Fiji) Roy Krishna^{3} (Republic of Ireland) Shaun Timmins^{3} (Malta) Manny Muscat^{2}	
Western Sydney Wanderers	(Croatia) Mateo Poljak	(Germany) Jérome Polenz	(Italy) Iacopo La Rocca	(Japan) Shinji Ono	(Netherlands) Youssouf Hersi	(New Zealand) Kwabena Appiah^{2}	

The following do not fill a Visa position:
^{1}Those players who were born and started their professional career abroad but have since gained Australian citizenship (and New Zealand citizenship, in the case of Wellington Phoenix);
^{2}Australian citizens (and New Zealand citizens, in the case of Wellington Phoenix) who have chosen to represent another national team;
^{3}Injury Replacement Players, or National Team Replacement Players;
^{4}Guest Players (eligible to play a maximum of ten games)

=== Salary cap exemptions and captains ===
Club	Australian Marquee	International Marquee	Captain	Vice-Captain
Adelaide United	None	None	(Australia) Eugene Galekovic	(Brazil) Cássio
Brisbane Roar	(Australia) Matt McKay	(Germany) Thomas Broich	(Australia) Matt Smith	(Australia) Shane Stefanutto
Central Coast Mariners	None	None	(Malta) John Hutchinson	(New Zealand) Michael McGlinchey
Melbourne Heart	(Australia) David Williams	(Netherlands) Orlando Engelaar	(Australia) Harry Kewell	(Netherlands) Rob Wielaert
Melbourne Victory	(Australia) Archie Thompson	(Chile) Pablo Contreras	(Australia) Mark Milligan	(Australia) Leigh Broxham
Newcastle Jets	None	(England) Emile Heskey	(Australia) Ruben Zadkovich	(Netherlands) Kew Jaliens
Perth Glory	(New Zealand) Shane Smeltz	(France) William Gallas	(Australia) Jacob Burns	(Australia) Michael Thwaite
Sydney FC	(Australia) Brett Emerton	(Italy) Alessandro Del Piero	(Italy) Alessandro Del Piero	(Australia) Brett Emerton (Northern Ireland) Terry McFlynn
Wellington Phoenix	None	None	(New Zealand) Andrew Durante	(New Zealand) Ben Sigmund
Western Sydney Wanderers	None	(Japan) Shinji Ono	(Australia) Michael Beauchamp	(Australia) Nikolai Topor-Stanley

== Regular season ==
=== League table ===
Pos	Team	Pld	W	D	L	GF	GA	GD	Pts	Qualification
1	Brisbane Roar (C)	27	16	4	7	43	25	+18	52	Qualificaition for 2015 AFC Champions League group stage and finals series
2	Western Sydney Wanderers	27	11	9	7	34	29	+5	42	Qualificaition for 2015 AFC Champions League group stage and finals series
3	Central Coast Mariners	27	12	6	9	33	36	−3	42	Qualification for 2015 AFC Champions League qualifying play-off and finals series (Note: Since the winner of 2014 A-League Grand Final (Brisbane Roar) qualified for the 2015 AFC Champions League group stage, the 2nd and 3rd placed teams qualified for the group stage and the qualifying play-off of 2015 AFC Champions League.)
4	Melbourne Victory	27	11	8	8	42	43	−1	41	Qualification for Finals series
5	Sydney FC	27	12	3	12	40	38	+2	39	Qualification for Finals series
6	Adelaide United	27	10	8	9	45	36	+9	38	Qualification for Finals series
7	Newcastle Jets	27	10	6	11	34	34	0	36	
8	Perth Glory	27	7	7	13	28	37	−9	28	
9	Wellington Phoenix (Note: Wellington Phoenix cannot qualify for the AFC Champions League as they are not recognised as an AFC club.)	27	7	7	13	36	51	−15	28	
10	Melbourne Heart	27	6	8	13	36	42	−6	26	

Updated to match(es) played on 13 April 2014. Source: ultimatealeague.com
Rules for classification: 1) points; 2) goal difference; 3) number of goals scored.
(C) Champions

=== Home and away season ===
The 2013–14 season will see each team play 27 games, kicking off on 11 October 2013, and concluding on 13 April 2014.

==== Round 1 ====
11 October 2013	Sydney FC	2–0	Newcastle Jets	Allianz Stadium, Sydney
Friday 19:30 AEDT	Del Piero 37'; Chianese 60'	Report		Attendance: 20,103; Referee: Jarred Gillett

12 October 2013	Central Coast Mariners	1–1	Western Sydney Wanderers	Bluetongue Stadium, Gosford
Saturday 17:30 AEDT	Duke 55'	Report	Juric 87'	Attendance: 17,134; Referee: Kris Griffiths-Jones

12 October 2013	Melbourne Victory	0–0	Melbourne Heart	Etihad Stadium, Melbourne
Saturday 19:45 AEDT		Report		Attendance: 45,202; Referee: Peter Green

13 October 2013	Wellington Phoenix	1–2	Brisbane Roar	Westpac Stadium, Wellington
Sunday 17:00 NZDT	Huysegems 22'	Report	Berisha 47'; Franjić 90+2'	Attendance: 8,239; Referee: Tim McGilchrist

13 October 2013	Adelaide United	3–1	Perth Glory	Coopers Stadium, Adelaide
Sunday 16:30 ACDT	Jerónimo 9', 25'; F. Ferreira 64'	Report	Nagai 11'	Attendance: 10,320; Referee: Ben Williams

==== Round 2 ====
18 October 2013	Adelaide United	2–2	Melbourne Victory	Coopers Stadium, Adelaide
Friday 19:00 ACDT	Cirio 21' (pen.); Jerónimo 25'	Report	Finkler 79'; Troisi 90+3'	Attendance: 16,504; Referee: Alan Milliner

19 October 2013	Melbourne Heart	2–2	Central Coast Mariners	AAMI Park, Melbourne
Saturday 17:30 AEDT	Williams 54', 60'	Report	Flores 70' (pen.), 76' (pen.)	Attendance: 8,734; Referee: Ben Williams

19 October 2013	Brisbane Roar	4–0	Sydney FC	Suncorp Stadium, Brisbane
Saturday 19:30 AEST	Smith 37'; Henrique 39'; North 44'; Broich 80'	Report		Attendance: 21,841; Referee: Peter Green

20 October 2013	Newcastle Jets	0–0	Perth Glory	Hunter Stadium, Newcastle
Sunday 15:00 AEDT		Report		Attendance: 12,383; Referee: Shaun Evans

20 October 2013	Western Sydney Wanderers	1–1	Wellington Phoenix	Pirtek Stadium, Parramatta
Sunday 17:00 AEDT	Polenz 16'	Report	Brockie 60'	Attendance: 16,294; Referee: Jarred Gillett

==== Round 3 ====
25 October 2013	Melbourne Victory	1–0	Brisbane Roar	Etihad Stadium, Melbourne
Friday 19:30 AEDT	Troisi 56'	Report		Attendance: 21,693; Referee: Ben Williams

26 October 2013	Central Coast Mariners	1–0	Adelaide United	Bluetongue Stadium, Gosford
Saturday 17:30 AEDT	Fitzgerald 2'	Report		Attendance: 9,109; Referee: Peter Green

26 October 2013	Sydney FC	0–2	Western Sydney Wanderers	Allianz Stadium, Sydney
Saturday 19:45 AEDT		Report	La Rocca 11'; Ono 26'	Attendance: 40,388; Referee: Strebre Delovski

27 October 2013	Wellington Phoenix	0–0	Newcastle Jets	McLean Park, Napier
Sunday 17:00 NZDT		Report		Attendance: 9,020; Referee: Adam Kersey

27 October 2013	Perth Glory	1–0	Melbourne Heart	nib Stadium, Perth
Sunday 14:00 AWST	Maclaren 51'	Report		Attendance: 13,856; Referee: Kris Griffiths-Jones

==== Round 4 ====
1 November 2013	Western Sydney Wanderers	2–1	Adelaide United	Pirtek Stadium, Parramatta
Friday 19:30 AEDT	Juric 60', 80'	Report	Carrusca 54'	Attendance: 16,279; Referee: Jarred Gillett

2 November 2013	Perth Glory	1–0	Sydney FC	nib Stadium, Perth
Saturday 14:30 AWST	McGarry 9' (pen.)	Report		Attendance: 10,613; Referee: Ben Williams

2 November 2013	Newcastle Jets	2–2	Central Coast Mariners	Hunter Stadium, Newcastle
Saturday 19:30 AEDT	Neville 51'; Pasfield 56' (o.g.)	Report	Flores 65' (pen.); Sterjovski 80'	Attendance: 13,744; Referee: Kris Griffiths-Jones

3 November 2013	Brisbane Roar	3–0	Melbourne Heart	Suncorp Stadium, Brisbane
Sunday 16:00 AEST	Henrique 48', 65'; Smith 77'	Report		Attendance: 15,011; Referee: Lucien Laverdure

4 November 2013	Melbourne Victory	3–2	Wellington Phoenix	Etihad Stadium, Melbourne
Monday 19:30 AEDT	A. Thompson 9'; Troisi 22', 31'	Report	Brockie 37'; Ifill 85'	Attendance: 23,226; Referee: Matthew Gillett

==== Round 5 ====
8 November 2013	Melbourne Heart	0–1	Western Sydney Wanderers	AAMI Park, Melbourne
Friday 19:30 AEDT		Report	Cole 27'	Attendance: 8,070; Referee: Peter O'Leary

9 November 2013	Wellington Phoenix	1–1	Perth Glory	AMI Stadium, Christchurch
Saturday 17:00 NZDT	Durante 4'	Report	Nagai 29'	Attendance: 9,671; Referee: Alan Milliner

9 November 2013	Adelaide United	1–2	Newcastle Jets	Coopers Stadium, Adelaide
Saturday 17:00 ACDT	F. Ferreira 71'	Report	Jaliens 41'; Taggart 52'	Attendance: 10,244; Referee: Strebre Delovski

9 November 2013	Sydney FC	3–2	Melbourne Victory	Allianz Stadium, Sydney
Saturday 19:45 AEDT	Garcia 3'; Ryall 15'; Del Piero 37' (pen.)	Report	A. Thompson 18'; Troisi 27'	Attendance: 18,784; Referee: Peter Green

10 November 2013	Central Coast Mariners	0–1	Brisbane Roar	Bluetongue Stadium, Gosford
Sunday 17:00 AEDT		Report	Yeboah 89'	Attendance: 8,303; Referee: Ben Williams

==== Round 6 ====
15 November 2013	Melbourne Heart	0–2	Sydney FC	AAMI Park, Melbourne
Friday 19:30 AEDT		Report	Del Piero 26' (pen.); Chianese 45+1'	Attendance: 8,941; Referee: Alan Milliner

16 November 2013	Perth Glory	1–1	Adelaide United	nib Stadium, Perth
Saturday 14:30 AWST	Harold 69'	Report	Malik 52'	Attendance: 8,574; Referee: Shaun Evans

16 November 2013	Western Sydney Wanderers	1–0	Melbourne Victory	Pirtek Stadium, Parramatta
Saturday 19:45 AEDT	Bridge 82'	Report		Attendance: 15,854; Referee: Kris Griffiths-Jones

17 November 2013	Newcastle Jets	2–1	Brisbane Roar	Hunter Stadium, Newcastle
Sunday 17:00 AEDT	Taggart 51', 74'	Report	Brattan 39'	Attendance: 7,692; Referee: Matthew Gillett

19 December 2013 rescheduled	Central Coast Mariners	1–0	Wellington Phoenix	North Sydney Oval, North Sydney
Thursday 19:30 AEDT	Roux 27'	Report		Attendance: 6,755; Referee: Kris Griffiths-Jones

==== Round 7 ====
22 November 2013	Brisbane Roar	3–1	Western Sydney Wanderers	Suncorp Stadium, Brisbane
Friday 19:00 AEST	Berisha 5'; Franjić 19'; Yeboah 90+1'	Report	Šantalab 28'	Attendance: 19,066; Referee: Strebre Delovski

23 November 2013	Sydney FC	2–1	Wellington Phoenix	Allianz Stadium, Sydney
Saturday 17:30 AEDT	Garcia 35'; Bojić (yellow card) 6' (yellow-red card) 73'; Despotović 90+4'	Report	Cunningham 90+1'	Attendance: 14,503; Referee: Jarred Gillett

23 November 2013	Melbourne Victory	3–0	Adelaide United	Etihad Stadium, Melbourne
Saturday 19:45 AEDT	Barbarouses 14'; A. Thompson 68'; Nichols 76'	Report		Attendance: 20,064; Referee: Ben Williams

23 November 2013	Perth Glory	1–2	Central Coast Mariners	nib Stadium, Perth
Saturday 18:45 AWST	Maclaren 25'	Report	McGlinchey 35'; Duke 90+3'	Attendance: 8,923; Referee: Adam Kersey

24 November 2013	Newcastle Jets	3–1	Melbourne Heart	Hunter Stadium, Newcastle
Sunday 17:00 AEDT	Taggart 38', 55', 62'	Report	Migliorini 58'	Attendance: 12,806; Referee: Peter Green

==== Round 8 ====
29 November 2013	Central Coast Mariners	0–0	Melbourne Victory	Bluetongue Stadium, Gosford
Friday 19:30 AEDT		Report		Attendance: 5,787; Referee: Kris Griffiths-Jones

30 November 2013	Brisbane Roar	1–0	Perth Glory	Suncorp Stadium, Brisbane
Saturday 16:30 AEST	Berisha 57'	Report		Attendance: 12,308; Referee: Tim McGilchrist

30 November 2013	Sydney FC	2–0	Newcastle Jets	Allianz Stadium, Sydney
Saturday 19:30 AEDT	Chianese 45+1'; Despotović 60'	Report		Attendance: 14,803; Referee: Ben Williams

1 December 2013	Wellington Phoenix	0–0	Western Sydney Wanderers	Westpac Stadium, Wellington
Sunday 17:00 NZDT		Report		Attendance: 7,147; Referee: Lucien Laverdure

1 December 2013	Melbourne Heart	3–3	Adelaide United	AAMI Park, Melbourne
Sunday 17:00 AEDT	Migliorini 54', 66'; Williams 71' (pen.)	Report	Lustica 3'; Cirio 15'; Carrusca 77'	Attendance: 6,002; Referee: Strebre Delovski

==== Round 9 ====
6 December 2013	Adelaide United	1–2	Brisbane Roar	Coopers Stadium, Adelaide
Friday 19:00 ACDT	Malik 7'	Report	Berisha 21' (pen.), 72'	Attendance: 8,861; Referee: Peter O'Leary

6 December 2013	Perth Glory	4–2	Wellington Phoenix	nib Stadium, Perth
Friday 18:45 AWST	Sidnei 16', 90+1'; Thwaite 60'; Zahra 82'	Report	Huysegems 36'; Ifill 49'	Attendance: 8,232; Referee: Matthew Gillett

7 December 2013	Western Sydney Wanderers	1–1	Melbourne Heart	Pirtek Stadium, Parramatta
Saturday 17:30 AEDT	Mooy 44'	Report	Williams 38'	Attendance: 14,549; Referee: Kris Griffiths-Jones

7 December 2013	Central Coast Mariners	1–0	Sydney FC	Bluetongue Stadium, Gosford
Saturday 19:30 AEDT	McBreen 26'	Report		Attendance: 10,251; Referee: Peter Green

8 December 2013	Melbourne Victory	1–2	Newcastle Jets	AAMI Park, Melbourne
Sunday 17:00 AEDT	Troisi 50'	Report	N. Burns 44', 66'	Attendance: 18,113; Referee: Alan Milliner

==== Round 10 ====
13 December 2013	Melbourne Victory	2–0	Perth Glory	AAMI Park, Melbourne
Friday 19:30 AEDT	Traoré 36'; Finkler 89'	Report		Attendance: 17,008; Referee: Peter Green

14 December 2013	Wellington Phoenix	1–2	Brisbane Roar	Westpac Stadium, Wellington
Saturday 17:30 NZDT	Hernández 48' (pen.)	Report	Smith 37'; Franjić 74'	Attendance: 6,374; Referee: Shaun Evans

14 December 2013	Adelaide United	4–0	Central Coast Mariners	Coopers Stadium, Adelaide
Saturday 17:00 ACDT	Djite 25'; F. Ferreira 40'; Cirio 54'; Jerónimo 90'	Report		Attendance: 7,785; Referee: Ben Williams

14 December 2013	Newcastle Jets	0–1	Western Sydney Wanderers	Hunter Stadium, Newcastle
Saturday 19:30 AEDT		Report	Bridge 33'	Attendance: 16,634; Referee: Jarred Gillett

15 December 2013	Sydney FC	2–1	Melbourne Heart	Allianz Stadium, Sydney
Sunday 17:00 AEDT	Del Piero 43'; Despotović 45+1'	Report	Mifsud 72'	Attendance: 16,008; Referee: Chris Beath

==== Round 11 ====
20 December 2013	Brisbane Roar	0–2	Newcastle Jets	Suncorp Stadium, Brisbane
Friday 19:00 AEST		Report	Donachie 34' (o.g.); Gibbs 87'	Attendance: 14,848; Referee: Peter Green

21 December 2013	Melbourne Heart	1–3	Melbourne Victory	AAMI Park, Melbourne
Saturday 19:30 AEDT	Kalmar 80'	Report	Nichols 38', 63'; Troisi 60'	Attendance: 26,491; Referee: Ben Williams

22 December 2013	Wellington Phoenix	1–0	Sydney FC	Westpac Stadium, Wellington
Sunday 19:00 NZDT	Huysegems 33'	Report		Attendance: 6,339; Referee: Peter O'Leary

22 December 2013	Perth Glory	0–0	Adelaide United	nib Stadium, Perth
Sunday 16:00 AWST		Report		Attendance: 9,436; Referee: Alan Milliner

23 December 2013	Western Sydney Wanderers	2–0	Central Coast Mariners	Pirtek Stadium, Parramatta
Monday 19:00 AEDT	Juric 19'; Hersi 32'	Report		Attendance: 15,786; Referee: Strebre Delovski

==== Round 12 ====
26 December 2013	Sydney FC	2–5	Brisbane Roar	Allianz Stadium, Sydney
Thursday 19:30 AEDT	Del Piero 11'; Garcia 90+4'	Report	Broich 20'; Petratos 23' (pen.), 35', 78' (pen.); Franjić 90+3'	Attendance: 17,662; Referee: Ben Williams

27 December 2013	Melbourne Heart	0–1	Wellington Phoenix	AAMI Park, Melbourne
Friday 19:30 AEDT		Report	Huysegems 75'	Attendance: 6,486; Referee: Strebre Delovski

28 December 2013	Melbourne Victory	1–1	Western Sydney Wanderers	AAMI Park, Melbourne
Saturday 19:30 AEDT	Finkler 90+4'	Report	Šantalab 71'	Attendance: 22,133; Referee: Peter Green

29 December 2013	Adelaide United	1–0	Newcastle Jets	Coopers Stadium, Adelaide
Sunday 16:30 ACDT	Djite 26'	Report		Attendance: 10,778; Referee: Chris Beath

31 December 2013	Central Coast Mariners	2–1	Perth Glory	Bluetongue Stadium, Gosford
Tuesday 19:30 AEDT	Sainsbury 11'; McGlinchey 90+6'	Report	McGarry 83' (pen.)	Attendance: 12,919; Referee: Shaun Evans

==== Round 13 ====
1 January 2014	Western Sydney Wanderers	1–3	Wellington Phoenix	Pirtek Stadium, Parramatta
Wednesday 19:00 AEDT	Bridge 62'	Report	Boyd 68'; Huysegems 78', 84'	Attendance: 14,151; Referee: Lucien Laverdure

3 January 2014	Adelaide United	2–2	Sydney FC	Coopers Stadium, Adelaide
Friday 19:00 ACDT	F. Ferreira 24'; Barker-Daish 72' (pen.)	Report	Despotović 9'; Gameiro 82'	Attendance: 15,437; Referee: Strebre Delovski

4 January 2014	Newcastle Jets	0–1	Perth Glory	Hunter Stadium, Newcastle
Saturday 17:30 AEDT		Report	Harold 38'	Attendance: 11,966; Referee: Matthew Gillett

4 January 2014	Melbourne Victory	0–3	Brisbane Roar	AAMI Park, Melbourne
Saturday 19:30 AEDT		Report	Miller 28'; McKay 56'; Petratos 67'	Attendance: 23,121; Referee: Kris Griffiths-Jones

5 January 2014	Central Coast Mariners	0–0	Melbourne Heart	Bluetongue Stadium, Gosford
Sunday 17:00 AEDT		Report		Attendance: 8,062; Referee: Jarred Gillett

==== Round 14 ====
10 January 2014	Newcastle Jets	1–1	Melbourne Victory	Hunter Stadium, Newcastle
Friday 19:30 AEDT	Nichols 42' (o.g.)	Report	Nabbout 49'	Attendance: 12,270; Referee: Strebre Delovski

10 January 2014	Perth Glory	3–0	Melbourne Heart	nib Stadium, Perth
Friday 18:45 AWST	Zahra 64'; Smeltz 86', 89'	Report		Attendance: 9,045; Referee: Peter Green

11 January 2014	Brisbane Roar	1–2	Adelaide United	Suncorp Stadium, Brisbane
Saturday 16:30 AEST	Berisha 80'	Report	Jerónimo 21'; Elsey 90+2'	Attendance: 17,593; Referee: Alan Milliner

11 January 2014	Western Sydney Wanderers	1–0	Sydney FC	Pirtek Stadium, Parramatta
Saturday 19:30 AEDT	Šantalab 87'	Report		Attendance: 18,080; Referee: Jarred Gillett

12 January 2014	Wellington Phoenix	1–1	Central Coast Mariners	Westpac Stadium, Wellington
Sunday 19:00 NZDT	Cunningham 45'	Report	Simon 16'	Attendance: 7,000; Referee: Matthew Gillett

==== Round 15 ====
17 January 2014	Melbourne Heart	3–1	Newcastle Jets	AAMI Park, Melbourne
Friday 19:30 AEDT	Ramsay 44'; Dugandžić 45+1', 68'	Report	Regan 37'	Attendance: 5,046; Referee: Alan Milliner

17 January 2014	Perth Glory	0–0	Brisbane Roar	nib Stadium, Perth
Friday 18:45 AWST		Report		Attendance: 11,026; Referee: Kris Griffiths-Jones

18 January 2014	Wellington Phoenix	5–0	Melbourne Victory	Westpac Stadium, Wellington
Saturday 19:30 NZDT	Hernández 21', 45+2' (pen.); Cunningham 45+1'; Brockie 85'; Huysegems 87'	Report		Attendance: 6,813; Referee: Adam Kersey

18 January 2014	Sydney FC	0–1	Central Coast Mariners	Allianz Stadium, Sydney
Saturday 19:30 AEDT		Report	Sterjovski 58'	Attendance: 16,006; Referee: Peter O'Leary

19 January 2014	Adelaide United	1–0	Western Sydney Wanderers	Coopers Stadium, Adelaide
Sunday 16:30 ACDT	Carrusca 4'	Report		Attendance: 11,356; Referee: Peter Green

==== Round 16 ====
24 January 2014	Brisbane Roar	2–1	Wellington Phoenix	Suncorp Stadium, Brisbane
Friday 19:00 AEST	Clut 50'; Brattan 87'	Report	Huysegems 36'	Attendance: 13,889; Referee: Chris Beath

25 January 2014	Adelaide United	2–2	Melbourne Heart	Coopers Stadium, Adelaide
Saturday 17:00 ACDT	Djite 22'; Ry. Griffiths 90'	Report	Kewell 61' (pen.); Kisnorbo 78'	Attendance: 11,100; Referee: Kris Griffiths-Jones

25 January 2014	Central Coast Mariners	3–0	Newcastle Jets	Central Coast Stadium, Gosford
Saturday 19:30 AEDT	Cáceres 13'; McBreen 32'; Simon 45+2'	Report		Attendance: 10,920; Referee: Jarred Gillett

26 January 2014	Melbourne Victory	0–5	Sydney FC	Etihad Stadium, Melbourne
Sunday 17:00 AEDT		Report	Despotović 11'; Del Piero 20' (pen.), 54'; Ryall 25'; Carle 87'	Attendance: 24,354; Referee: Ben Williams

26 January 2014	Western Sydney Wanderers	3–1	Perth Glory	Pirtek Stadium, Parramatta
Sunday 19:00 AEDT	Šantalab 28'; Mooy 35'; Bridge 71' (pen.)	Report	Smeltz 56'	Attendance: 14,111; Referee: Strebre Delovski

==== Round 17 ====
31 January 2014	Melbourne Heart	2–1	Sydney FC	AAMI Park, Melbourne
Friday 19:30 AEDT	Germano 52'; Williams 89'	Report	Gameiro 39'	Attendance: 7,674; Referee: Jarred Gillett

31 January 2014	Perth Glory	1–1	Melbourne Victory	nib Stadium, Perth
Friday 18:45 AWST	Šernas 50'	Report	Finkler 37' (pen.)	Attendance: 10,151; Referee: Kris Griffiths-Jones

1 February 2014	Wellington Phoenix	2–1	Adelaide United	Eden Park, Auckland
Saturday 19:30 NZDT	Hernández 22'; Cunningham 44'	Report	Mabil 90+3'	Attendance: 18,506; Referee: Peter Green

1 February 2014	Newcastle Jets	2–2	Western Sydney Wanderers	Hunter Stadium, Newcastle
Saturday 19:30 AEDT	Taggart 26', 90'	Report	Mooy 45'; Beauchamp 65'	Attendance: 15,924; Referee: Ben Williams

2 February 2014	Brisbane Roar	2–1	Central Coast Mariners	Suncorp Stadium, Brisbane
Sunday 16:00 AEST	Henrique 66'; Berisha 90'	Report	Sterjovski 36' (pen.)	Attendance: 16,078; Referee: Strebre Delovski

==== Round 18 ====
7 February 2014	Western Sydney Wanderers	1–1	Brisbane Roar	Pirtek Stadium, Parramatta
Friday 19:30 AEDT	Haliti 85'	Report	Berisha 13'	Attendance: 16,401; Referee: Kris Griffiths-Jones

8 February 2014	Central Coast Mariners	1–3	Melbourne Victory	Central Coast Stadium, Gosford
Saturday 17:30 AEDT	Ibini 11'	Report	Troisi 45+1', 62'; A. Thompson 50'	Attendance: 9,138; Referee: Matthew Gillett

8 February 2014	Sydney FC	0–3	Adelaide United	Allianz Stadium, Sydney
Saturday 19:30 AEDT		Report	Djite 16'; F. Ferreira 27'; Jerónimo 80'	Attendance: 13,335; Referee: Alan Milliner

9 February 2014 rescheduled	Melbourne Heart	2–1	Perth Glory	Lavington Sports Ground, Albury
Sunday 17:00 AEDT	Kisnorbo 51'; Williams 81'	Report	McGarry 73'	Attendance: 7,218; Referee: Lucien Laverdure

9 February 2014	Newcastle Jets	2–3	Wellington Phoenix	Hunter Stadium, Newcastle
Sunday 17:00 AEDT	Goodwin 26', 46'	Report	Hernández 21'; Huysegems 33'; Hicks 71'	Attendance: 10,406; Referee: Shaun Evans

==== Round 19 ====
14 January 2014; Rescheduled	Melbourne Victory	3–1	Western Sydney Wanderers	AAMI Park, Melbourne
Tuesday 19:30 AEDT	A. Thompson 52'; Barbarouses 62'; Finkler 90+5'	Report	Juric 90+4'	Attendance: 14,774; Referee: Ben Williams

14 February 2014	Adelaide United	2–0	Central Coast Mariners	Coopers Stadium, Adelaide
Friday 19:00 ACDT	Carrusca 33'; F. Ferreira 45+1'	Report		Attendance: 6,980; Referee: Kris Griffiths-Jones

15 February 2014	Sydney FC	2–1	Perth Glory	Allianz Stadium, Sydney
Saturday 17:30 AEDT	Despotović 17'; Antonis 64'	Report	Ro. Griffiths 67'	Attendance: 11,160; Referee: Chris Beath

16 February 2014	Wellington Phoenix	0–5	Melbourne Heart	Westpac Stadium, Wellington
Sunday 17:00 NZDT		Report	Engelaar 9'; Williams 19', 51', 63'; Moss 54' (o.g.)	Attendance: 9,767; Referee: Jarred Gillett

16 February 2014	Brisbane Roar	0–1	Newcastle Jets	Suncorp Stadium, Brisbane
Sunday 16:00 AEST		Report	Taggart 59' (pen.)	Attendance: 13,066; Referee: Takuto Okabe (Japan)

==== Round 20 ====
21 February 2014	Central Coast Mariners	1–4	Wellington Phoenix	Central Coast Stadium, Gosford
Friday 19:30 AEDT	Ibini 20'	Report	Cunningham 47'; Hernández 64'; Huysegems 65'; Brockie 82'	Attendance: 6,147; Referee: Alan Milliner

22 February 2014	Newcastle Jets	0–2	Sydney FC	Hunter Stadium, Newcastle
Saturday 17:30 AEDT		Report	Ognenovski 60'; Del Piero 73' (pen.)	Attendance: 12,449; Referee: Strebre Delovski

22 February 2014	Melbourne Victory	4–3	Adelaide United	AAMI Park, Melbourne
Saturday 19:30 AEDT	Finkler 15', 56'; A. Thompson 66'; Barbarouses 75'	Report	Cirio 3', 45', 83'	Attendance: 18,341; Referee: Kris Griffiths-Jones

22 February 2014	Perth Glory	0–2	Western Sydney Wanderers	nib Stadium, Perth
Saturday 18:30 AWST		Report	Poljak 12'; Juric 70'	Attendance: 8,543; Referee: Shaun Evans

23 February 2014	Melbourne Heart	1–0	Brisbane Roar	AAMI Park, Melbourne
Sunday 17:00 AEDT	Engelaar 61'	Report		Attendance: 7,816; Referee: Adam Kersey

==== Round 21 ====
27 February 2014 rescheduled	Adelaide United	5–1	Wellington Phoenix	Coopers Stadium, Adelaide
Thursday 19:00 ACDT	Jerónimo 23', 62'; Cirio 29'; F. Ferreira 59'; Mabil 90+2'	Report	Cunningham 67'	Attendance: 8,596; Referee: Lucien Laverdure

28 February 2014	Brisbane Roar	3–1	Perth Glory	Suncorp Stadium, Brisbane
Friday 19:00 AEST	Franjić 56'; Miller 80'; Broich 85'	Report	Smeltz 90+1'	Attendance: 10,896; Referee: Ben Williams

1 March 2014	Central Coast Mariners	2–1	Sydney FC	Central Coast Stadium, Gosford
Saturday 17:30 AEDT	Kim 26'; Duke 75'	Report	Garcia 62'	Attendance: 6,430; Referee: Jarred Gillett

1 March 2014	Melbourne Heart	4–0	Melbourne Victory	AAMI Park, Melbourne
Saturday 19:30 AEDT	Engelaar 9'; Dugandžić 15'; Williams 83'; Kewell 86'	Report		Attendance: 25,546; Referee: Strebre Delovski

2 March 2014	Western Sydney Wanderers	0–2	Newcastle Jets	Pirtek Stadium, Parramatta
Sunday 17:00 AEDT		Report	Jaliens 37'; Taggart 64'	Attendance: 12,079; Referee: Chris Beath

==== Round 22 ====
7 March 2014	Melbourne Victory	3–1	Central Coast Mariners	AAMI Park, Melbourne
Friday 19:30 AEDT	J. Jeggo 31'; Troisi 77' (pen.); Barbarouses 90+2'	Report	Anderson 63'	Attendance: 15,031; Referee: Ben Williams

8 March 2014	Newcastle Jets	1–0	Melbourne Heart	Hunter Stadium, Newcastle
Saturday 17:30 AEDT	Taggart 53'	Report		Attendance: 10,117; Referee: Adam Kersey

8 March 2014	Sydney FC	3–1	Western Sydney Wanderers	Allianz Stadium, Sydney
Saturday 19:30 AEDT	Jurman 59'; Garcia 75'; Abbas 90+3' (pen.)	Report	Ono 49'	Attendance: 40,285; Referee: Kris Griffiths-Jones

9 March 2014	Wellington Phoenix	1–1	Perth Glory	Westpac Stadium, Wellington
Sunday 17:00 NZDT	Cunningham 85'	Report	Gallas 34'	Attendance: 6,401; Referee: Jarred Gillett

9 March 2014	Brisbane Roar	2–1	Adelaide United	Suncorp Stadium, Brisbane
Sunday 16:00 AEST	Berisha 22', 51'	Report	Jerónimo 90+3'	Attendance: 12,514; Referee: Shaun Evans

==== Round 23 ====
14 March 2014	Sydney FC	1–1	Brisbane Roar	Allianz Stadium, Sydney
Friday 19:30 AEDT	Ryall 35'	Report	Berisha 23'	Attendance: 13,073; Referee: Peter O'Leary

15 March 2014 rescheduled	Western Sydney Wanderers	0–0	Adelaide United	Pirtek Stadium, Parramatta
Saturday 18:00 AEDT		Report		Attendance: 11,892; Referee: Strebre Delovski

15 March 2014 rescheduled	Central Coast Mariners	3–1	Newcastle Jets	Central Coast Stadium, Gosford
Saturday 20:00 AEDT	Bosnar 1'; Ibini 6'; G. Trifiro 88'	Report	J. Griffiths 23'	Attendance: 7,455; Referee: Peter Green

15 March 2014 rescheduled	Perth Glory	1–2	Melbourne Victory	nib Stadium, Perth
Saturday 19:15 AWST	Milligan 27' (o.g.)	Report	Milligan 40' (pen.); A. Thompson 90'	Attendance: 7,068; Referee: Shaun Evans

16 March 2014	Melbourne Heart	2–2	Wellington Phoenix	AAMI Park, Melbourne
Sunday 17:00 AEDT	Germano 29'; Williams 62' (pen.)	Report	Krishna 6'; Boyd 56'	Attendance: 5,614; Referee: Ben Williams

==== Round 24 ====
21 March 2014	Adelaide United	3–1	Sydney FC	Coopers Stadium, Adelaide
Friday 19:00 ACDT	F. Ferreira 13'; Cirio 54'; Djite 88'	Report	M. Thompson 74'	Attendance: 14,212; Referee: Kris Griffiths-Jones

22 March 2014	Newcastle Jets	5–0	Wellington Phoenix	Hunter Stadium, Newcastle
Saturday 17:30 AEDT	Heskey 35'; J. Griffiths 46'; Taggart 57', 77'; Bridges 90+3'	Report		Attendance: 9,483; Referee: Strebre Delovski

22 March 2014	Brisbane Roar	1–0	Melbourne Victory	Suncorp Stadium, Brisbane
Saturday 18:30 AEST	Brattan 90+2'	Report		Attendance: 17,965; Referee: Peter Green

23 March 2014	Melbourne Heart	1–2	Central Coast Mariners	AAMI Park, Melbourne
Sunday 15:00 AEDT	Engelaar 34'	Report	Kim 45+2'; Ibini 77'	Attendance: 5,418; Referee: Hiroyuki Kimura (Japan)

23 March 2014	Western Sydney Wanderers	3–0	Perth Glory	Pirtek Stadium, Parramatta
Sunday 17:00 AEDT	Polenz 42'; Bridge 61'; Juric 78'	Report		Attendance: 12,128; Referee: Tim McGilchrist

==== Round 25 ====
28 March 2014	Brisbane Roar	2–1	Melbourne Heart	Suncorp Stadium, Brisbane
Friday 19:00 AEST	Petratos 36'; Henrique 73'	Report	Behich 18'	Attendance: 10,101; Referee: Chris Beath

29 March 2014	Central Coast Mariners	2–1	Western Sydney Wanderers	Central Coast Stadium, Gosford
Saturday 17:30 AEDT	Rose 32'; Ibini 90'	Report	Topor-Stanley 40'	Attendance: 13,157; Referee: Strebre Delovski

29 March 2014	Melbourne Victory	1–1	Sydney FC	AAMI Park, Melbourne
Saturday 19:30 AEDT	Troisi 64'	Report	Chianese 48'	Attendance: 20,447; Referee: Jarred Gillett

30 March 2014	Wellington Phoenix	0–1	Adelaide United	Westpac Stadium, Wellington
Sunday 15:00 NZDT		Report	Carrusca 58' (pen.)	Attendance: 6,453; Referee: Peter Green

30 March 2014	Perth Glory	2–1	Newcastle Jets	nib Stadium, Perth
Sunday 16:00 AWST	Marinković 84'; Harold 85'	Report	Taggart 62'	Attendance: 5,837; Referee: Kris Griffiths-Jones

==== Round 26 ====
4 April 2014	Adelaide United	2–2	Melbourne Heart	Coopers Stadium, Adelaide
Friday 19:00 ACDT	Carrusca 1'; F. Ferreira 90+3'	Report	Williams 33' (pen.); Dugandžić 42'	Attendance: 13,845; Referee: Ben Williams

5 April 2014	Newcastle Jets	2–2	Melbourne Victory	Hunter Stadium, Newcastle
Saturday 17:30 AEDT	Taggart 18'; Leijer 22' (o.g.)	Report	Milligan 21', 86' (pen.)	Attendance: 10,185; Referee: Strebre Delovski

5 April 2014	Western Sydney Wanderers	1–1	Brisbane Roar	Pirtek Stadium, Parramatta
Saturday 19:30 AEDT	Juric 61'	Report	Miller 35'	Attendance: 15,573; Referee: Peter Green

5 April 2014	Perth Glory	3–1	Central Coast Mariners	nib Stadium, Perth
Saturday 18:30 AWST	McGarry 8' (pen.); Sidnei 71'; Anderson 85' (o.g.)	Report	Fitzgerald 19' (pen.)	Attendance: 11,127; Referee: Stephen Lucas

6 April 2014	Sydney FC	4–1	Wellington Phoenix	Allianz Stadium, Sydney
Sunday 17:00 AEST	Del Piero 33' (pen.), 45'; Ryall 57'; Abbas 60'	Report	Hernández 56' (pen.)	Attendance: 10,148; Referee: Kris Griffiths-Jones

==== Round 27 ====
11 April 2014	Newcastle Jets	2–0	Adelaide United	Hunter Stadium, Newcastle
Friday 19:30 AEST	J. Griffiths 21'; Taggart 90'	Report		Attendance: 11,226; Referee: Peter O'Leary

12 April 2014	Wellington Phoenix	1–4	Melbourne Victory	Westpac Stadium, Wellington
Saturday 17:30 NZST	Brockie 90+3'	Report	A. Thompson 1'; Troisi 29'; Finkler 45'; Milligan 59' (pen.)	Attendance: 5,336; Referee: Chris Beath

12 April 2014	Melbourne Heart	2–3	Western Sydney Wanderers	AAMI Park, Melbourne
Saturday 17:30 AEST	Engelaar 34'; Hoffman 72'	Report	Topor-Stanley 27'; Šantalab 81'; Hersi 86'	Attendance: 10,003; Referee: Chris Johansen

12 April 2014	Brisbane Roar	0–2	Central Coast Mariners	Suncorp Stadium, Brisbane
Saturday 19:30 AEST		Report	Fitzgerald 24'; Cáceres 28'	Attendance: 14,218; Referee: Kris Griffiths-Jones

13 April 2014	Sydney FC	2–1	Perth Glory	Allianz Stadium, Sydney
Sunday 17:00 AEST	Antonis 38'; Garcia 90+3'	Report	Ro. Griffiths 45+1'	Attendance: 15,285; Referee: Lucian Laverdure

== Finals series ==
Elimination-finals
Melbourne Victory	2
Sydney FC	1
Central Coast Mariners	1
Adelaide United	0

Semi-finals
Brisbane Roar	1
Melbourne Victory	0
Western Sydney Wanderers	2
Central Coast Mariners	0

Grand Final
Brisbane Roar (a.e.t.)	2
Western Sydney Wanderers	1

=== Elimination-finals ===
18 April 2014	Melbourne Victory	2–1	Sydney FC	Etihad Stadium, Melbourne
19:30 AEST	A. Thompson 19'; Finkler 90+2'	Report	Ryall 34'	Attendance: 20,802; Referee: Peter Green

19 April 2014	Central Coast Mariners	1–0	Adelaide United	Central Coast Stadium, Gosford
16:30 AEST	Ibini-Isei 67'	Report		Attendance: 9,045; Referee: Ben Williams

=== Semi-finals ===
26 April 2014	Western Sydney Wanderers	2–0	Central Coast Mariners	Pirtek Stadium, Parramatta
18:30 AEST	Hersi 31'; La Rocca 81'	Report		Attendance: 19,216; Referee: Kris Griffiths-Jones

27 April 2014	Brisbane Roar	1–0	Melbourne Victory	Suncorp Stadium, Brisbane
17:00 AEST	Berisha 58'			Attendance: 28,350; Referee: Strebre Delovski

=== Grand Final ===
4 May 2014	Brisbane Roar	2–1 (a.e.t)	Western Sydney Wanderers	Suncorp Stadium, Brisbane
16:00 AEST	Berisha 86'; Henrique 108'	Report	Špiranović 56'	Attendance: 51,153; Referee: Peter Green

== Season statistics ==
=== Top scorers ===
As of match 13 April 2014

Rank	Player	Club	Goals
1	(Australia) Adam Taggart	Newcastle Jets	16
2	(Australia) James Troisi	Melbourne Victory	12
2	(Australia) David Williams	Melbourne Heart	12
4	(Albania) Besart Berisha	Brisbane Roar	11
5	(Italy) Alessandro Del Piero	Sydney FC	10
5	(Belgium) Stein Huysegems	Wellington Phoenix	10
7	(Portugal) Fábio Ferreira	Adelaide United	9
7	(Argentina) Jerónimo Neumann	Adelaide United	9
9	(Spain) Sergio Cirio	Adelaide United	8
9	(Brazil) Gui Finkler	Melbourne Victory	8
9	(Australia) Tomi Juric	Western Sydney Wanderers	8
9	(Australia) Archie Thompson	Melbourne Victory	8

==== Own goals ====
Player		Team	Against	Week
(Australia)	Justin Pasfield	Central Coast Mariners	Newcastle Jets	4
(Australia)	James Donachie	Brisbane Roar	Newcastle Jets	11
(Australia)	Mitch Nichols	Melbourne Victory	Newcastle Jets	14
(New Zealand)	Glen Moss	Wellington Phoenix	Melbourne Heart	19
(Australia)	Mark Milligan	Melbourne Victory	Perth Glory	23
(Australia)	Adrian Leijer	Melbourne Victory	Newcastle Jets	26
(Australia)	Zachary Anderson	Central Coast Mariners	Perth Glory	26

=== Attendances ===
These are the attendance records of each of the teams at the end of the home and away season. The table does not include finals series attendances.

Team	Hosted	Average	High	Low	Total
Melbourne Victory	13	21,808	45,202	14,774	283,507
Sydney FC	14	18,682	40,388	10,148	261,543
Brisbane Roar	14	14,957	21,841	10,101	209,394
Western Sydney Wanderers	13	14,860	18,080	11,892	193,178
Newcastle Jets	14	11,949	16,634	7,692	167,285
Adelaide United	13	11,225	16,504	6,980	145,928
Melbourne Heart	14	9,933	26,491	5,046	139,059
Perth Glory	13	9,418	13,856	5,837	122,431
Central Coast Mariners	14	9,398	17,134	5,787	131,567
Wellington Phoenix	13	8,201	18,056	5,336	106,616
League total	135	13,041	45,202	5,046	1,760,508

==== Top 10 Season Attendances ====
Attendance	Round	Date	Home	Score	Away	Venue	Weekday	Time of Day
51,153	GF	4 May 2014	Brisbane Roar	2 – 1 (a.e.t.)	Western Sydney Wanderers	Suncorp Stadium	Sunday	Night
45,202	1	12 October 2013	Melbourne Victory	0–0	Melbourne Heart	Etihad Stadium	Saturday	Night
40,388	3	26 October 2013	Sydney FC	0–2	Western Sydney Wanderers	Allianz Stadium	Saturday	Night
40,285	22	8 March 2014	Sydney FC	3–1	Western Sydney Wanderers	Allianz Stadium	Saturday	Night
28,350	SF	27 April 2014	Brisbane Roar	1–0	Melbourne Victory	Suncorp Stadium	Sunday	Night
26,491	11	21 December 2013	Melbourne Heart	1–3	Melbourne Victory	AAMI Park	Saturday	Night
25,546	21	1 March 2014	Melbourne Heart	4–0	Melbourne Victory	AAMI Park	Saturday	Night
24,354	16	26 January 2014	Melbourne Victory	0–5	Sydney FC	Etihad Stadium	Sunday	Afternoon
23,226	4	4 November 2013	Melbourne Victory	3–2	Wellington Phoenix	Etihad Stadium	Monday	Night
22,133	12	28 December 2013	Melbourne Victory	1–1	Western Sydney Wanderers	AAMI Park	Saturday	Night

=== Discipline ===
The Fair Play Award will go to the team with the lowest points on the fair play ladder at the conclusion of the home and away season.

1 point	Yellow Card
2 points	Second Caution Red Card
3 points	Direct Red Card

Team	Yellow card	Yellow card Yellow card Red card	Red card	Points
Adelaide United	65	2	2	75
Brisbane Roar	43	2	2	53
Central Coast Mariners	53	0	0	53
Melbourne Heart	59	1	1	64
Melbourne Victory	59	2	2	69
Newcastle Jets	66	0	2	72
Perth Glory	62	1	0	64
Sydney FC	58	3	1	67
Wellington Phoenix	60	2	0	64
Western Sydney Wanderers	62	0	0	62
Totals	587	13	10	

Current as of 13 April 2014

== Awards ==
=== End-of-season awards ===
- Johnny Warren Medal – Thomas Broich, Brisbane Roar
- NAB Young Footballer of the Year – Adam Taggart, Newcastle Jets
- Nike Golden Boot Award – Adam Taggart, Newcastle Jets (16 goals)
- Goalkeeper of the Year – Eugene Galekovic, Adelaide United
- Manager of the Year – Mike Mulvey, Brisbane Roar
- Fair Play Award – Brisbane Roar
- Referee of the Year – Peter Green
- Goal of the Year – Orlando Engelaar, Melbourne Heart (Melbourne Heart v Central Coast Mariners, 23 March 2014)

== See also ==
- 2013–14 Adelaide United FC season
- 2013–14 Brisbane Roar FC season
- 2013–14 Central Coast Mariners FC season
- 2013–14 Melbourne Heart FC season
- 2013–14 Melbourne Victory FC season
- 2013–14 Newcastle Jets FC season
- 2013–14 Perth Glory FC season
- 2013–14 Sydney FC season
- 2013–14 Wellington Phoenix FC season
- 2013–14 Western Sydney Wanderers FC season
