= A-League Men attendance =

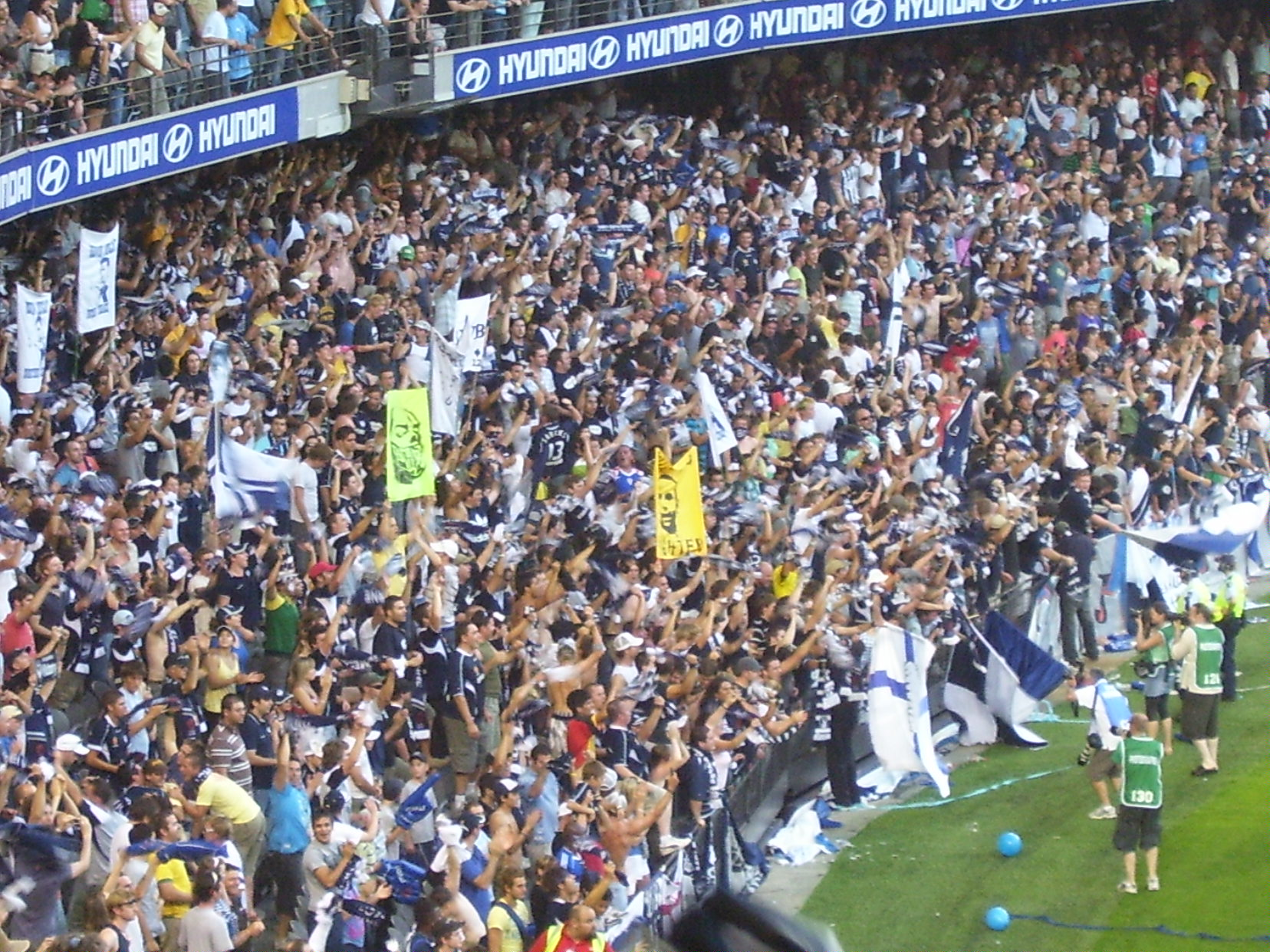
Melbourne Victory averaged the most of more than 15,000 fans consistently per season from 2006–07 to 2019–20.

The A-League Men is the premier professional soccer league in Australia. Founded in 2005, the 2013–14 season saw an average 13,041 spectators between the 10 teams, the second-highest average attendance in league history. In 2013 the league had the fourth-highest average attendance among Australian football code crowds.

== Highest attendances (regular season) ==
| Rank | Home team | Score | Away team | Attendance | Stadium | Date | Season |
|---|---|---|---|---|---|---|---|
| 1 | Western Sydney Wanderers | 0–4 | Sydney FC | 61,880 | ANZ Stadium | 8 October 2016 | 2016–17 |
| 2 | Melbourne Victory | 0–0 | Sydney FC | 50,333 | Telstra Dome | 8 December 2006 | 2006–07 |
| 3 | Melbourne Victory | 0–0 | Melbourne Heart | 45,202 | Etihad Stadium | 12 October 2013 | 2013–14 |
| 4 | Western Sydney Wanderers | 1–0 | Sydney FC | 44,843 | ANZ Stadium | 18 February 2017 | 2016–17 |
| 5 | Melbourne Victory | 5–2 | Melbourne City | 43,729 | Etihad Stadium | 25 October 2014 | 2014–15 |
| 6 | Melbourne Victory | 1–4 | Melbourne City | 43,188 | Etihad Stadium | 16 October 2016 | 2016–17 |
| 7 | Melbourne Victory | 1–2 | Melbourne Heart | 42,032 | Etihad Stadium | 5 October 2012 | 2012–13 |
| 8 | Sydney FC | 3–1 | Western Sydney Wanderers | 41,213 | Allianz Stadium | 18 October 2014 | 2014–15 |
| 9 | Melbourne Victory | 2–1 | Melbourne Heart | 41,203 | Docklands Stadium | 2 February 2013 | 2012–13 |
| 10 | Sydney FC | 1–0 | Western Sydney Wanderers | 40,539 | Allianz Stadium | 24 October 2015 | 2015–16 |
| 11 | Melbourne Victory | 1–2 | Melbourne City | 40,504 | Marvel Stadium | 20 October 2018 | 2018–19 |
minimum 40,500 attendance

== Highest attendances (finals) ==
| Rank | Home team | Score | Away team | Attendance | Stadium | Round | Date | Season |
|---|---|---|---|---|---|---|---|---|
| 1 | Perth Glory | 0–0 (1–4p) | Sydney FC | 56,371 | Optus Stadium | Grand Final | 19 May 2019 | 2018–19 |
| 2 | Melbourne Victory | 6–0 | Adelaide United | 55,436 | Etihad Stadium | Grand Final | 18 February 2007 | 2006–07 |
| 3 | Melbourne Victory | 1–0 | Adelaide United | 53,273 | Etihad Stadium | Grand Final | 28 February 2009 | 2008–09 |
| 4 | Brisbane Roar | 2–1 | Western Sydney Wanderers | 51,153 | Suncorp Stadium | Grand Final | 4 May 2014 | 2013–14 |
| 5 | Brisbane Roar | 2–1 | Perth Glory | 50,334 | Suncorp Stadium | Grand Final | 22 April 2012 | 2011–12 |
| 6 | Brisbane Roar | 2–2 (4–2p) | Central Coast Mariners | 50,168 | Suncorp Stadium | Grand Final | 13 March 2011 | 2010–11 |
| 7 | Adelaide United | 3–1 | Western Sydney Wanderers | 50,119 | Adelaide Oval | Grand Final | 1 May 2016 | 2015–16 |
minimum 50,000 attendance

== Highest attendances by individual clubs (regular season) ==
| Club | Score | Opponent | Attendance | Stadium | Date | Season |
|---|---|---|---|---|---|---|
| Adelaide United | 1–1 | Melbourne Victory | 33,126 | Adelaide Oval | 17 October 2014 | 2014–15 |
| Auckland FC | 2–1 | Wellington Phoenix | 26,253 | GO Media Stadium | 8 December 2024 | 2024–25 |
| Brisbane Roar | 1–1 | Sydney FC | 32,371 | Suncorp Stadium | 20 January 2007 | 2006–07 |
| Central Coast Mariners | 1–2 | Newcastle Jets | 19,238 | Bluetongue Stadium | 12 January 2008 | 2007–08 |
| Gold Coast United | 5–1 | Newcastle Jets | 14,783 | Skilled Park | 22 January 2011 | 2010–11 |
| Macarthur FC | 1-3 | Western Sydney Wanderers | 9,213 | Campbelltown Stadium | 3 May 2025 | 2024-25 |
| Melbourne City | 3–2 | Melbourne Victory | 26,579 | AAMI Park | 23 December 2011 | 2011–12 |
| Melbourne Victory | 0–0 | Sydney FC | 50,333 | Telstra Dome | 8 December 2006 | 2006–07 |
| New Zealand Knights | 1–3 | Sydney FC | 9,827 | North Harbour Stadium | 2 September 2005 | 2005–06 |
| Newcastle Jets | 0–3 | Western Sydney Wanderers | 22,518 | Hunter Stadium | 29 March 2013 | 2012–13 |
| North Queensland Fury | 2–3 | Sydney FC | 8,897 | Dairy Farmers Stadium | 8 August 2009 | 2008–09 |
| Perth Glory | 0–2 | Melbourne Victory | 17,856 | HBF Park | 30 March 2019 | 2018–19 |
| Sydney FC | 3–2 | Western Sydney Wanderers | 41,213 | Allianz Stadium | 18 October 2014 | 2014–15 |
| Wellington Phoenix | 0–2 | Auckland FC | 26,252 | Sky Stadium | 2 November 2024 | 2024–25 |
| Western Sydney Wanderers | 0–4 | Sydney FC | 61,880 | ANZ Stadium | 8 October 2016 | 2016–17 |
| Western United | 3–1 | Melbourne Victory | 10,128 | GMHBA Stadium | 8 December 2019 | 2019–20 |

== Lowest attendances by individual clubs (regular season) ==
| Club | Score | Opponent | Attendance | Stadium | Date | Season |
|---|---|---|---|---|---|---|
| Adelaide United | 1–1 | Newcastle Jets | 2,363 | Carrington Park | 25 January 2012 | 2011–12 |
| Auckland FC | 2–2 | Melbourne Victory | 10,077 | GO Media Stadium | 11 April 2026 | 2025–26 |
| Brisbane Roar | 0–3 | Wellington Phoenix | 1,600 | Moreton Daily Stadium | 30 March 2022 | 2021–22 |
| Central Coast Mariners | 4–2 | Macarthur FC | 1,057 | Glen Willow Regional Sports Stadium | 19 March 2022 | 2021–22 |
| Gold Coast United | 3–3 | Central Coast Mariners | 1,141 | Skilled Park | 22 February 2012 | 2011–12 |
| Macarthur FC | 2–1 | Western United | 1,872 | Campbelltown Stadium | 20 March 2021 | 2020–21 |
| Melbourne City | 1–1 | Western Sydney Wanderers | 2,292 | AAMI Park | 14 March 2020 | 2019–20 |
| Melbourne Victory | 5–4 | Western Sydney Wanderers | 3,235 | Marvel Stadium | 23 April 2021 | 2020–21 |
| New Zealand Knights | 0–1 | Central Coast Mariners | 1,623 | North Harbour Stadium | 28 September 2006 | 2006–07 |
| Newcastle Jets | 1–4 | Adelaide United | 2,414 | McDonald Jones Stadium | 21 March 2021 | 2020–21 |
| North Queensland Fury | 1–2 | Brisbane Roar | 1,003 | Skilled Park | 8 February 2011 | 2010–11 |
| Perth Glory | 0–1 | Wellington Phoenix | 89 | Netstrata Jubilee Stadium | 13 April 2022 | 2021–22 |
| Sydney FC | 2–2 | Macarthur FC | 1,759 | Netstrata Jubilee Stadium | 30 March 2022 | 2021–22 |
| Wellington Phoenix | 3–0 | Brisbane Roar | 38 | Leichhardt Oval | 16 February 2022 | 2021–22 |
| Western Sydney Wanderers | 3–2 | Newcastle Jets | 3,767 | CommBank Stadium | 20 April 2022 | 2021–22 |
| Western United | 2–0 | Newcastle Jets | 990 | AAMI Park | 26 April 2021 | 2020–21 |

== Seasonal average attendances ==
| Season | Regular Season Average (Excludes Finals) | | | | | | | | | | | | | | | | |
| Season | ADL | AKL | BRI | CCM | GCU | MAC | MCY | MVC | NEW | NZK | NQF | PER | SYD | WEL | WSW | WUN | Total |
|---|---|---|---|---|---|---|---|---|---|---|---|---|---|---|---|---|---|
| 2005–06 | 10,948 | – | 14,785 | 7,899 | – | – | – | 16,167 | 9,022 | 3,909 | – | 9,734 | 16,669 | – | – | – | 10,956 |
| 2006–07 | 12,165 | – | 16,465 | 9,828 | – | – | – | 27,728 | 12,573 | 3,011 | – | 7,589 | 15,555 | – | – | – | 12,911 |
| 2007–08 | 12,697 | – | 16,951 | 12,738 | – | – | – | 26,064 | 13,209 | – | – | 7,596 | 16,963 | 11,683 | – | – | 14,610 |
| 2008–09 | 11,713 | – | 12,995 | 10,465 | – | – | – | 24,516 | 9,729 | – | – | 7,942 | 12,375 | 7,193 | – | – | 12,180 |
| 2009–10 | 10,765 | – | 8,665 | 7,388 | 5,297 | – | – | 20,750 | 6,358 | – | 6,723 | 9,205 | 13,677 | 8,966 | – | – | 9,793 |
| 2010–11 | 11,552 | – | 9,291 | 8,168 | 3,419 | – | 8,312 | 18,458 | 8,429 | – | 4,245 | 8,488 | 8,014 | 7,829 | – | – | 8,429 |
| 2011–12 | 8,829 | – | 13,387 | 9,505 | 3,438 | – | 9,082 | 20,714 | 12,117 | – | – | 8,972 | 11,861 | 8,691 | – | – | 10,497 |
| 2012–13 | 9,793 | – | 13,857 | 9,994 | – | – | 8,860 | 21,885 | 13,389 | – | – | 8,876 | 18,737 | 6,877 | 12,466 | – | 12,347 |
| 2013–14 | 11,225 | – | 14,957 | 9,398 | – | – | 9,933 | 21,808 | 11,949 | – | – | 9,418 | 18,682 | 8,201 | 14,860 | – | 13,041 |
| 2014–15 | 12,637 | – | 11,660 | 7,585 | – | – | 10,374 | 25,388 | 8,968 | – | – | 9,542 | 17,378 | 8,583 | 12,520 | – | 12,511 |
| 2015–16 | 11,287 | – | 12,850 | 8,111 | – | – | 11,047 | 23,112 | 9,586 | – | – | 8,986 | 16,637 | 8,042 | 14,297 | – | 12,326 |
| 2016–17 | 9,565 | – | 13,892 | 7,395 | – | – | 10,593 | 22,008 | 8,645 | – | – | 10,533 | 16,001 | 6,211 | 17,746 | – | 12,294 |
| 2017–18 | 9,830 | – | 9,093 | 7,194 | – | – | 9,868 | 17,631 | 11,016 | – | – | 9,186 | 14,593 | 5,694 | 11,924 | – | 10,671 |
| 2018–19 | 9,031 | – | 9,632 | 5,562 | – | – | 8,135 | 20,604 | 9,079 | – | – | 10,360 | 13,566 | 8,533 | 9,191 | – | 10,411 |
| 2019–20 | 8,326 | – | 9,388 | 5,504 | – | – | 8,397 | 17,366 | 7,386 | – | – | 8,382 | 12,110 | 8,477 | 13,729 | 5,653 | 9,428 |
| 2020–21 | 7,383 | – | 6,181 | 5,697 | – | 3,488 | 6,154 | 5,823 | 4,056 | – | – | 4,777 | 7,686 | 5,329 | 8,062 | 3,061 | 5,682 |
| 2021–22 | 6,501 | – | 4,538 | 4,296 | – | 3,118 | 6,530 | 9,473 | 4,843 | – | – | 4,281 | 5,534 | 4,001 | 7,388 | 3,351 | 5,353 |
| 2022–23 | 10,359 | – | 5,629 | 6,646 | – | 3,514 | 6,481 | 10,124 | 6,152 | – | – | 4,451 | 17,008 | 6,333 | 10,769 | 3,168 | 7,553 |
| 2023–24 | 10,035 | – | 6,510 | 7,399 | – | 4,161 | 8,488 | 12,227 | 5,704 | – | – | 5,655 | 14,293 | 8,940 | 10,326 | 3,274 | 8,087 |
| 2024–25 | 10,575 | 18,101 | 6,216 | 6,392 | – | 4,674 | 6,192 | 12,778 | 6,496 | – | – | 6,090 | 15,282 | 7,990 | 9,809 | 3,644 | 8,788 |
| 2025–26 | 11,073 | 13,256 | 6,624 | 5,104 | – | 4,193 | 7,319 | 11,024 | 9,496 | – | – | 7,080 | 12,459 | 5,697 | 8,043 | – | 8,447 |
Green and red background denote club's highest and lowest A-League Men season attendances respectively.
Statistics for 2019–20 A-League seasons includes figures up until the COVID-19 outbreak.

Seasonal gate receipts

| Season | Total | | |
| Season | Regular Season | Finals | Season |
|---|---|---|---|
| 2005–06 | 920,318 | 126,240 | 1,046,558 |
| 2006–07 | 1,084,550 | 177,682 | 1,262,232 |
| 2007–08 | 1,227,244 | 154,118 | 1,381,362 |
| 2008–09 | 1,023,151 | 143,559 | 1,166,710 |
| 2009–10 | 1,322,004 | 161,195 | 1,483,199 |
| 2010–11 | 1,390,844 | 121,635 | 1,512,479 |
| 2011–12 | 1,417,084 | 119,147 | 1,536,231 |
| 2012–13 | 1,666,875 | 105,258 | 1,772,133 |
| 2013–14 | 1,760,508 | 128,566 | 1,889,074 |
| 2014–15 | 1,688,951 | 137,825 | 1,826,776 |
| 2015–16 | 1,653,025 | 117,112 | 1,770,147 |
| 2016–17 | 1,659,854 | 111,160 | 1,771,014 |
| 2017–18 | 1,440,031 | 89,575 | 1,529,606 |
| 2018–19 | 1,407,148 | 115,622 | 1,522,770 |
| 2019–20 | 1,073,309 | 12,425 | 1,085,734 |
| 2020–21 | 850,442 | 41,680 | 892,122 |
| 2021–22 | 818,988 | 77,254 | 896,242 |
| 2022–23 | 1,178,245 | 124,417 | 1,302,662 |
| 2023–24 | 1,302,074 | 138,011 | 1,446,299 |
| 2024–25 | 1,485,093 | 105,525 | 1,590,618 |
| 2025–26 | 1,317,792 | 129,455 | 1,447,247 |
Green and red background denote highest and lowest A-League Men season attendances respectively.
