= David Williams (Australian soccer) =

Australian soccer player (born 1988)

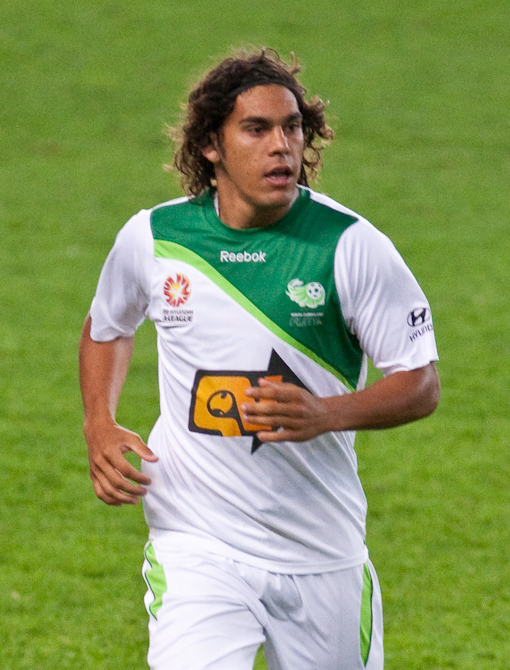
- Williams with North Queensland Fury in 2009

Personal information
- Full name: David Joel Williams
- Date of birth: 26 February 1988 (age 38)
- Place of birth: Brisbane, Queensland, Australia
- Height: 1.77 m (5 ft 10 in)
- Positions: Striker; winger

Youth career
- Pine Hills
- Westside
- 2002–2003: Mitchelton
- 2004–2005: QAS

Senior career*
| Years | Team | Apps | (Gls) |
| 2005–2006 | Queensland Roar | 2 | (0) |
| 2006–2010 | Brøndby | 34 | (4) |
| 2009–2010 | → North Queensland Fury (loan) | 21 | (3) |
| 2010–2011 | North Queensland Fury | 28 | (5) |
| 2011 | → Sydney FC (loan) | 0 | (0) |
| 2011–2016 | Melbourne City | 101 | (21) |
| 2016–2018 | Haladás | 66 | (20) |
| 2018–2019 | Wellington Phoenix | 27 | (11) |
| 2019–2020 | ATK | 18 | (7) |
| 2020–2022 | Mohun Bagan | 37 | (10) |
| 2022–2025 | Perth Glory | 48 | (11) |
| Total | | 382 | (92) |

International career
| 2004–2005 | Australia U17 | 14 | (11) |
| 2005–2006 | Australia U20 | 12 | (10) |
| 2007–2008 | Australia U23 | 11 | (7) |
| 2008–2010 | Australia | 2 | (0) |

Managerial career
- 2025–: U16 National Indigenous Boys Team
- 2025–: WA Para Football Team
- 2026–: Stirling Macedonia (technical director)
Medal record
Men's football
Representing Australia
OFC U-20 Championship
| Winner | 2005 Solomon Islands |
- * Club domestic league appearances and goals

David Joel Williams (born 26 February 1988) is a former Australian professional soccer player who last played as a forward for Perth Glory. Williams is the first Indigenous Australian player to play for A-League club Melbourne City. He also represented Australia's national team twice. David currently coaching as technical director for NPL WA team Stirling Macedonia.

Born in Brisbane, Williams played youth football at the Queensland Academy of Sport before making his professional debut for Queensland Roar. Williams has played for several A-League clubs including Queensland Roar, North Queensland Fury, Sydney FC and Melbourne City and Wellington Phoenix.

Williams has also played in Europe for Danish Superliga club Brøndby and Hungarian NB I club Haladás.

Williams is a member of the Indigenous Football Australia Council, which oversees John Moriarty Football, an Indigenous grassroots football initiative.

== Club career ==
=== Youth career ===
Born in Brisbane, Australia, Williams started playing football for amateur clubs Westside and Pine Hills, before moving to play youth football for Mitchelton FC. He attended Northside Christian College while also being a member of the Queensland Academy of Sport (CAS) squad.

He spent time training with Belgian club Club Brugge, and Premier League club Liverpool, and in January 2006, he signed for Australian A-League side Queensland Roar for the remainder of the 2005–06 season. Queensland Roar coach Miron Bleiberg called Williams the best Australian prospect since Harry Kewell, and he was labelled the best young Australian striker by the former technical director of the Australian national team Ron Smith. Following two games as a substitute for Roar, he moved abroad in May 2006 to play for Danish team Brøndby IF on a three-year contract.

=== Brøndby IF ===
At Brøndby, Williams was included in the reserve team, and after 12 goals in five reserve team matches, he made his first team debut under Brøndby coach Rene Meulensteen on 5 August against AC Horsens. On 11 November, Williams scored his first Superliga goal for the Brøndby first team in the home game against Silkeborg IF. He also played against German outfit Eintracht Frankfurt in the European UEFA Cup tournament. In the Royal League game against Swedish side Hammarby IF on 30 November, Williams added another two goals in Brøndby's win over the Swedes. Under new Brøndby manager Tom Køhlert, Williams was promoted to the Brøndby first team squad in December 2006, alongside Marc Olsen. Williams played a total 19 games and scored one goal for Brøndby in the 2006–07 Superliga season. He played 10 games and scored three goals for Brøndby in the 2007–08 Superliga season.

Williams started the 2008–09 Danish season well, as he played five of Brøndby's first six Superliga games, and scored a goal against FC Haka in the UEFA Cup. He prolonged his Brøndby contract in September 2008, extending it until the summer 2011. He injured his knee in a training mishap in September 2008, and when Williams returned to fitness after the turn of the year, newly appointed Brøndby trainer Kent Nielsen left him out of the side. Williams' frustration at not playing led to him making a public outburst in June 2009, claiming he would leave the club in three weeks if they didn't play him. Brøndby responded by sending him out on trial to South African club Bidvest Wits.

=== A-League ===
==== North Queensland Fury ====
He joined the North Queensland Fury FC on a one-year loan deal for the 2009–10 A-League season and signed a permanent contract with the Fury in January 2010.

==== Sydney FC (loan) ====
On 16 February 2011, Sydney FC signed Williams on a short-term deal from the Fury for the AFC Champions League 2011 campaign. He made a total of 4 appearances for the club, during the unsuccessful campaign, in which Sydney FC finished third in the group.

==== Melbourne City ====
On 22 June 2011, he signed for A-League club Melbourne Heart (Melbourne City FC) on a three-year deal. He signed a two-year contract extension with the Heart on 20 March 2014, tying him to the club until the end of the 2015–16 season.

On Sunday 10 August 2014, Williams featured in the 2014 A-League All Stars Game, coming on as a 63rd-minute substitute for Alessandro Del Piero in what was the latter's last game in Australia. Williams was released from the club in January 2016.

=== Haladás ===
On 25 January 2016, Williams signed with Hungarian club Haladás in hopes of rejuvenating his hopes of playing for Australia. In June 2018, Williams left Haladás.

=== A-League return ===
==== Wellington Phoenix ====
On 23 July 2018, it was announced that Williams had signed a one-year deal with Wellington Phoenix to return to the A-league.

On 10 June 2019 it was announced that Williams would be leaving the Wellington Phoenix.

=== Indian Super League ===
==== ATK ====
On 28 June 2019, Indian Super League club ATK signed him from A-league club Wellington Phoenix on a one-year contract. Williams scored his first goal for the club in their 5–0 routing of Hyderabad FC. He ended the season with 7 goals and 5 assists and the Indian Super League title.

==== Mohun Bagan ====
On 8 September 2020, Mohun Bagan confirmed the signing of David Williams on a one-year contract. On 21 December 2020, he scored the first goal for the club in a 1-0 win over Bengaluru FC.

=== Perth Glory ===
Williams returned to Australia to sign with A-League Men side Perth Glory in August 2022.

In November 2025, he officially announced his retirement from playing after suffering an ACL injury in December 2024.

== International career ==
He was most noted for being selected in both of Australia's squads for the 2005 FIFA World Youth Championship in the Netherlands and the 2005 FIFA U-17 World Championship in Peru; however, as the World Youth Championship (U-20) was held before the U-17 World Championship, Williams was ruled ineligible to play in Peru, leaving Australia with only 19 members in its U-17 World Championship squad.

He was selected for Australia's World Cup qualifier with China on 22 June 2008, and came on as a substitute for James Holland.

== Managerial career ==
On 28 May 2025, Williams was announced as the coach of the Charles Perkins XI (U16 National Indigenous Football Team–Boys) at the Emerging Socceroos championships, held in July 2025.

On 28 November 2025, NPL WA club Stirling Macedonia announced Williams as its new Technical Director ahead of the 2026 season.

On 12 December 2025, Williams coached the West Australian Para Football team to their first ever championship title, winning the 2025 National Para Football Championships.

== Career statistics ==
=== Club ===
Appearances and goals by club, season and competition
| Club | Season | League | | | Cup | | Continental | | Total | |
| Club | Season | Division | Apps | Goals | Apps | Goals | Apps | Goals | Apps | Goals |
|---|---|---|---|---|---|---|---|---|---|---|
| Queensland Roar | 2005–06 | A-League | 2 | 0 | — | | — | | 2 | 0 |
| Brøndby | 2006–07 | Danish Superliga | 19 | 1 | 0 | 0 | 2 (Note: Appearance(s) in UEFA Europa League) | 0 | 21 | 1 |
| Brøndby | 2007–08 | Danish Superliga | 10 | 3 | 1 | 1 | 0 | 0 | 11 | 4 |
| Brøndby | 2008–09 | Danish Superliga | 5 | 0 | 1 (Note: Appearance(s) in Danish Cup) | 0 | 4 | 1 | 10 | 1 |
| Brøndby | Total | | 34 | 4 | 2 | 1 | 6 | 1 | 42 | 6 |
| North Queensland Fury (loan) | 2009–10 | A-League | 21 | 3 | — | | — | | 21 | 3 |
| North Queensland Fury | 2010–11 | A-League | 28 | 5 | — | | — | | 28 | 5 |
| Sydney FC (loan) | 2010–11 | A-League | 0 | 0 | — | | 4 (Note: Appearance(s) in AFC Champions League) | 0 | 4 | 0 |
| Melbourne City | 2011–12 | A-League | 15 | 1 | — | | — | | 15 | 1 |
| Melbourne City | 2012–13 | A-League | 24 | 5 | — | | — | | 24 | 5 |
| Melbourne City | 2013–14 | A-League | 26 | 12 | — | | — | | 26 | 12 |
| Melbourne City | 2014–15 | A-League | 26 | 3 | 1 | 0 | — | | 27 | 3 |
| Melbourne City | 2015–16 | A-League | 10 | 0 | 1 (Note: Appearance(s) in Australia Cup) | 0 | — | | 11 | 0 |
| Melbourne City | Total | | 101 | 21 | 2 | 0 | 4 | 0 | 107 | 21 |
| Haladás | 2015–16 | NB I | 14 | 2 | — | | — | | 14 | 2 |
| Haladás | 2016–17 | NB I | 25 | 11 | — | | — | | 25 | 11 |
| Haladás | 2017–18 | NB I | 27 | 7 | — | | — | | 27 | 7 |
| Haladás | Total | | 66 | 20 | 0 | 0 | 0 | 0 | 66 | 20 |
| Wellington Phoenix | 2018–19 | A-League | 27 | 11 | — | | — | | 27 | 11 |
| ATK | 2019–20 | Indian Super League | 18 | 7 | — | | — | | 18 | 7 |
| Mohun Bagan | 2020–21 | Indian Super League | 20 | 6 | — | | — | | 20 | 6 |
| Mohun Bagan | 2021–22 | Indian Super League | 17 | 4 | — | | 9 (Note: Appearance(s) in AFC Cup) | 6 | 26 | 10 |
| Mohun Bagan | Total | | 37 | 10 | 0 | 0 | 9 | 6 | 46 | 16 |
| Perth Glory | 2022–23 | A-League Men | 18 | 5 | — | | — | | 18 | 5 |
| Perth Glory | 2023–24 | A-League Men | 24 | 5 | 1 | 0 | — | | 25 | 5 |
| Perth Glory | 2024–25 | A-League Men | 6 | 1 | 3 | 1 | — | | 9 | 2 |
| Perth Glory | 2025–26 | A-League Men | 0 | 0 | — | | — | | 0 | 0 |
| Perth Glory | Total | | 48 | 11 | 4 | 1 | 0 | 0 | 52 | 13 |
| Career total | | | 382 | 92 | 8 | 2 | 19 | 7 | 409 | 101 |

=== International ===
Appearances and goals by national team and year
| National team | Year | Apps | Goals |
|---|---|---|---|
| Australia | 2008 | 1 | 0 |
| Australia | 2009 | 0 | 0 |
| Australia | 2010 | 1 | 0 |
| Total | | 2 | 0 |

== Honours ==
ATK

- Indian Super League: 2019–20

Mohun Bagan

- Indian Super League runner-up: 2020–21

Australia U20

- OFC U-20 Championship: 2005

Individual

- A-League All Star: 2013, 2014
- PFA A-League Team of the Year: 2013–14
- Melbourne City Player of the Season: 2013–14
- ATK Player of the Month: October 2019
