= Jeremy Walker (soccer) =

Australian soccer player (born 1993)

Personal information
- Full name: Jeremy Ross Walker
- Date of birth: 25 August 1993 (age 33)
- Place of birth: Ulverstone, Australia
- Height: 1.75 m (5 ft 9 in)
- Position: Right back

Team information
- Current team: Essendon Royals
- Number: 25

Youth career
- TIS
- 2011–2014: Melbourne Heart

Senior career*
Years	Team	Apps	(Gls)
2011	Oakleigh Cannons	2	(0)
2012–2014	Melbourne Heart	16	(0)
2012	Oakleigh Cannons	16	(0)
2014	Hume City	6	(0)
2014–2015	Concord Rangers	28	(0)
2015	Braintree Town	4	(0)
2015	→ Concord Rangers (loan)	5	(0)
2016	Hume City	26	(0)
2017	Green Gully	25	(0)
2017–2018	Perth Glory	13	(0)
2018–	Green Gully	80	(0)

International career
2013	Australia U-20	2	(0)
- * Club domestic league appearances and goals as of 3 November 2022

Jeremy Walker (born 25 August 1993) is an Australian footballer from Tasmania who plays as a right back for the Essendon Royals as of 2023.

== Club career ==
In 2010 Walker featured in Season 3 of Fox8 television show Football Superstar in an attempt to win a NYL contract with Brisbane Roar but he was eliminated in the third episode. He later signed with Oakleigh Cannons ahead on the 2011 Victorian Premier League season.

Following his season at Oakleigh, Walker was signed as a member of Melbourne Heart's inaugural NYL squad. During the 2012–13 season he made his debut for the senior team in Round 9 against Sydney FC. Later that season he was offered a senior contract by Heart and became the first player from Tasmania to earn a professional contract in the history of the A-League. Walker made a total of 16 senior appearances for Melbourne Heart before being released at the conclusion of the 2013–14 season.

Jeremy then returned to the NPL Victoria with Hume City FC and was named NPL Player of the Month in July.

After the 2014 NPL Victoria season, Walker signed with Concord Rangers in the Conference South. He joined Braintree Town ahead of the 2015/16 season but returned to Concord Rangers on loan soon after. Walker then returned to Australia, joining his former club Hume City once again.

On 11 October 2017, following an ankle-injury to Marc Warren, Perth Glory signed Walker on an injury replacement contract. He left Perth Glory at the conclusion of the season.

== International career ==
In April 2013 Walker was called up to the Young Socceroos squad for a training camp held on the Central Coast.

The next month he was also named in the Young Socceroos squad for a European training camp which included international friendly matches against the Netherlands U-21s (24 May) and the German U-21s (31 May).

== Personal life ==
Walker is of British and Portuguese descent.

Walker is now a High School Chemistry and Sport teacher at Elwood College
