= Ranko Despotović =

Serbian footballer (born 1983)

Personal information
- Date of birth: 21 January 1983 (age 43)
- Place of birth: Loznica, SFR Yugoslavia
- Height: 1.85 m (6 ft 1 in)
- Position: Forward

Team information
- Current team: Caravaca (manager)

Senior career*
Years	Team	Apps	(Gls)
2001–2003	Loznica	64	(21)
2003–2007	Vojvodina	64	(21)
2004–2005	→ Mačva Šabac (loan)	32	(10)
2008	Rapid București	8	(4)
2008–2010	Murcia	35	(8)
2009–2010	→ Salamanca (loan)	24	(4)
2010–2011	Girona	34	(18)
2011–2013	Urawa Red Diamonds	25	(1)
2013–2014	Sydney FC	17	(6)
2014–2015	Alavés	24	(4)
2016	Cádiz	16	(0)
2016	Marbella	15	(4)
Total		358	(101)

International career
2007–2011	Serbia	4	(0)

Managerial career
- 2021–2022: Minera
- 2022–2024: UD Caravaca
- 2024–: CD Cieza
- * Club domestic league appearances and goals

Ranko Despotović (Serbian Cyrillic: Ранко Деспотовић, pronounced [râːŋko despǒːtoʋitɕ]; born 21 January 1983) is a Serbian football manager and former footballer who is the manager of UD Caravaca.

== Club career ==
Born in Loznica, Serbia, Socialist Federal Republic of Yugoslavia, Despotović made his professional debuts with local FK Loznica aged only 17, and proceeded to score almost 30 goals overall in his first three years, subsequently being acquired by FK Vojvodina.

After parts of seasons loaned to lowly FK Mačva Šabac, he returned, having a stellar 2006–07 season and helping the team to the third place in the league and coming up second in the domestic cup; to help achieve this, he topped the nation's goal charts by netting 17 times.

In January 2008, Despotović signed with FC Rapid București in Romania, and continued abroad for the ensuing summer as he joined Spain's Real Murcia for three years and €1.5 million. He was brought to the club by head coach Javier Clemente, who became aware of the player while coaching the Serbia national team.

For the 2009–10 campaign, Despotović stayed in the country and its second division, moving on a season-long loan to UD Salamanca. The following year, still in that level, he led Girona FC with 18 goals (seventh-best in the competition) as the Catalans finished comfortably in mid-table.

On 1 July 2011, Despotović signed for Japan's Urawa Red Diamonds. In late 2013, following an unsuccessful trial at former club Girona, he moved to Sydney FC, after being convinced to join by former Vojvodina teammate Nikola Petković. He made his debut for his new team against Wellington Phoenix FC, coming on as a substitute and scoring the 2–1 winner in injury time.

Despotović returned to Spain on 7 July 2014, joining second-level side Deportivo Alavés. He subsequently competed in the country's lower leagues, with Cádiz CF and Marbella FC.

== International career ==
Despotović made his debut for Serbia in a UEFA Euro 2008 qualifier against Kazakhstan, a 1–0 home success on 24 November 2007. His fourth and final international was a June 2011 friendly match away against Australia.

== Career statistics ==
As of 4 March 2019

Appearances and goals by club, season and competition
Club	Season	League		National cup (Note: Includes Copa del Rey. Emperor's Cup.)		League cup (Note: Includes J. League Cup.)		Continental (Note: Includes UEFA Cup qualification.)		Total	
Club	Season	Apps	Goals	Apps	Goals	Apps	Goals	Apps	Goals	Apps	Goals
Loznica	2000–01	14	2			—		0	0	14	2
Loznica	2001–02	21	6			—		0	0	21	6
Loznica	2002–03	29	13			—		0	0	29	13
Loznica	Total	64	21			—		0	0	64	21
Mačva Šabac (loan)	2003–04	15	4			—		0	0	15	4
Mačva Šabac (loan)	2004–05	17	6			—		0	0	17	6
Mačva Šabac (loan)	Total	32	10			—		0	0	32	10
Vojvodina	2003–04	5	0	1	0	—		0	0	6	0
Vojvodina	2004–05	8	0	0	0	—		0	0	8	0
Vojvodina	2005–06	11	0	1	0	—		0	0	12	0
Vojvodina	2006–07	24	17	5	3	—		0	0	29	20
Vojvodina	2007–08	16	4	1	0	—		4	4	21	8
Vojvodina	Total	64	21	8	3	—		4	4	76	28
Rapid București	2007–08	8	4					0	0	8	4
Murcia	2008–09	35	8					0	0	35	8
Salamanca (loan)	2009–10	24	4	3	0			0	0	27	4
Girona	2010–11	34	18	1	1			0	0	35	19
Urawa Red Diamonds	2011	14	0	0	0	5	4	—		19	4
Urawa Red Diamonds	2012	11	1	0	0	4	1	—		15	2
Urawa Red Diamonds	Total	25	1	0	0	9	5	—		34	6
Sydney FC	2013–14	17	6	—		—		—		17	6
Alavés	2014–15	24	4	2	1	0	0	—		26	5
Cádiz	2015–16	16	0	0	0	0	0	—		16	0
Marbella	2016–17	15	4	0	0	0	0	—		15	4
Career total		358	101	14	5	9	5	4	4	385	115
