= Ross Archibald =

Australian professional football player

Personal information
- Full name: Ross Archibald
- Date of birth: 29 September 1994 (age 32)
- Place of birth: Sunnybank, Australia
- Height: 1.82 m (6 ft 0 in)
- Position: Midfielder

Team information
- Current team: Yarraville Glory

Youth career
- 2010–2013: Brisbane Roar
- 2013–2015: Melbourne City

Senior career*
| Years | Team | Apps | (Gls) |
| 2011 | QAS | 2 | (0) |
| 2013 | Olympic FC | 11 | (2) |
| 2014–2015 | Melbourne City | 4 | (0) |
| 2014 | Bentleigh Greens | 5 | (1) |
| 2015 | Fortuna Düsseldorf II | 1 | (0) |
| 2016–2017 | Bentleigh Greens | 48 | (2) |
| 2018 | Avondale FC | 28 | (1) |
| 2019 | Altona Magic | 10 | (2) |
| 2020 | Port Melbourne | 4 | (0) |
| 2020 | Gold Coast Knights | 10 | (0) |
| 2021 | Altona Magic | 7 | (1) |
| 2021–2023 | Port Melbourne | 50 | (3) |
| 2023–2025 | South Melbourne | 32 | (3) |
- * Club domestic league appearances and goals as of 5 April 2025 ‡ National team caps and goals as of 1 March 2014

Ross Archibald (born 29 September 1994) is an Australian professional football player who plays as a midfielder for Yarraville Glory in the Victorian State League.

== Club career ==
Born in Queensland, Archibald made his top-tier debut for Melbourne Heart in March 2014, coming on as a substitute for Harry Kewell in a Melbourne Derby. Archibald returned to Bentleigh Greens ahead of the 2016 NPLV season after six months in Germany with Fortuna Düsseldorf II.
