= David Vrankovic =

Australian soccer player

David Vranković
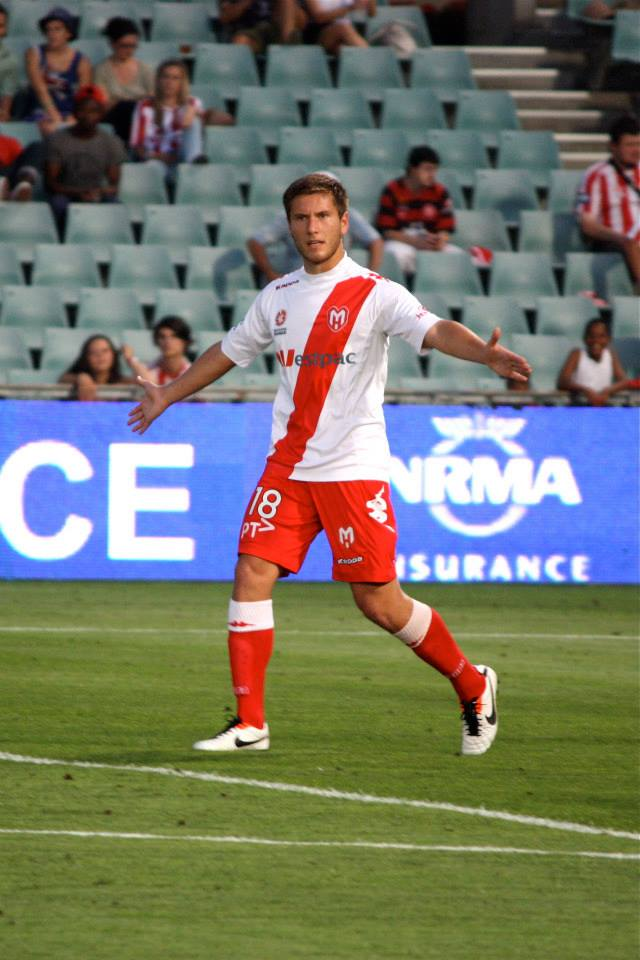
- Vranković with Melbourne Heart in 2013

Personal information
- Full name: David Vranković
- Date of birth: 11 November 1993 (age 32)
- Place of birth: Sydney, Australia
- Height: 1.81 m (5 ft 11 in)
- Position: Centre back

Team information
- Current team: Bonnyrigg White Eagles

Youth career
- Bonnyrigg White Eagles
- 2009: NSWIS
- 2009: AIS
- 2009–2010: Sydney FC
- 2011–2012: Newcastle Jets
- 2012–2014: Melbourne Heart

Senior career*
Years	Team	Apps	(Gls)
2011–2012	Bonnyrigg White Eagles	31	(3)
2012–2014	Melbourne Heart	13	(0)
2014	Bonnyrigg White Eagles	13	(0)
2015	Becamex Binh Duong	6	(0)
2015–	Bonnyrigg White Eagles	120	(12)

International career^{‡}
2012–2013	Australia U-20	3	(0)
2014	Australia U-23	1	(0)
- * Club domestic league appearances and goals as of 10 November 2021 ‡ National team caps and goals as of 17 January 2014

David Vranković (born 11 November 1993) is an Australian association football player who currently plays as a centre back for Bonnyrigg White Eagles F.C.

== Club career ==
On 5 October 2012 David made his professional debut for Melbourne Heart coming off the bench in a match against rival Melbourne Victory. On 12 January 2015 he was the fourth foreign player to be signed by Becamex Binh Duong for the AFC Champions League 2015.
