= Sam Mitchinson =

Australian soccer player (born 1992)

Personal information
- Full name: Samuel Mitchinson
- Date of birth: 26 September 1992 (age 34)
- Place of birth: Walsall, England
- Height: 1.80 m (5 ft 11 in)
- Positions: Left-back; central midfielder

Youth career
- 2009–2012: Perth Glory
- 2011: WA NTC
- 2012–2014: Melbourne Heart

Senior career*
Years	Team	Apps	(Gls)
2012	Perth Glory	1	(0)
2012	Oakleigh Cannons	18	(0)
2012–2014	Melbourne Heart	9	(0)
2014–2017	Bayswater City	77	(2)
2018	Green Gully	26	(0)
2019	Altona Magic	26	(3)
2020–2021	Gwelup Croatia	27	(1)
2022	Bayswater City	37	(1)
- * Club domestic league appearances and goals as of 23 November 2023

Samuel Mitchinson (born 26 September 1992) is an Australian soccer player who most recently played as a left-back or central midfielder for Bayswater City.

== Career ==
=== Perth Glory ===
In 2009, Mitchinson signed a youth contract with A-League club Perth Glory. He made his professional debut in the 2011-12 A-League season on 25 March 2012 in a round 27 match against Melbourne Victory at the nib Stadium. After the conclusion of the 2011–12 A-League season he left Perth and joined Oakleigh Cannons where he made nine league appearances.

=== Melbourne Heart ===
On 2 November he made his A-league debut for Melbourne Heart in Round 5 against Western Sydney at Parramatta Stadium.
