= Andrea Migliorini =

Italian footballer (born 1988)

Personal information
- Date of birth: 22 March 1988 (age 38)
- Place of birth: Mestre, Italy
- Height: 1.80 m (5 ft 11 in)
- Position: Central midfielder

Team information
- Current team: Lavello
- Number: 8

Youth career
- 2005–2008: Udinese

Senior career*
Years	Team	Apps	(Gls)
2008–2009	Livorno	3	(0)
2008–2009	→ Pro Patria (loan)	18	(2)
2009–2012	SPAL	66	(4)
2012–2013	Venezia	5	(0)
2013	Koper	5	(0)
2013–2014	Melbourne Heart	9	(3)
2014	Delta Porto Tolle	19	(2)
2014–2015	Pordenone	19	(3)
2015–2016	Mestre	18	(1)
2016–2017	Delta Porto Tolle	11	(1)
2017–2018	Messina	23	(2)
2018–2019	Cavese	25	(0)
2019–2020	Lecco	2	(0)
2020	Cavese	6	(0)
2021	Lavello	6	(0)
- * Club domestic league appearances and goals as of 7 February 2021

Andrea Migliorini (born 22 March 1988) is an Italian footballer who plays as a central midfielder.

== Club career ==
On 20 August 2018, he joined Serie C club Cavese.

On 18 July 2019, he signed a one-year contract with the newly promoted Serie C club Lecco.

On 3 January 2021, he moved to Serie D club Lavello.
