= Rob Wielaert =

Dutch footballer

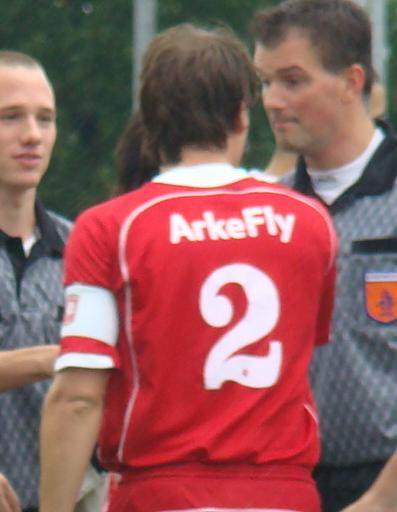
- Wielaert with FC Twente in 2008

Personal information
- Date of birth: 29 December 1978 (age 47)
- Place of birth: Emmeloord, Netherlands
- Height: 1.78 m (5 ft 10 in)
- Position: Centre-back

Senior career*
Years	Team	Apps	(Gls)
1997–1999	PSV	7	(0)
1999–2001	Den Bosch	53	(2)
2001–2002	PSV	3	(0)
2002–2006	NEC	145	(11)
2006–2009	Twente	83	(3)
2009–2011	Ajax	19	(1)
2010–2011	→ Roda JC (loan)	30	(1)
2011–2013	Roda JC	47	(1)
2013–2015	Melbourne City	37	(1)

International career
	Netherlands B	2	

Managerial career
- 2016–: Box Hill United (youth assistant)
- 2022: Melbourne Victory U14
- * Club domestic league appearances and goals

Robert Wielaert (Dutch pronunciation: [rɔp ˈʋilaːrt]; born 29 December 1978) is a Dutch former professional footballer who played as a centre-back.

== Playing career ==
=== Career in the Netherlands (1997–2013) ===
Wielaert was born in Emmeloord, Flevoland and made his debut in professional football with PSV Eindhoven in the 1997–98 season. He also played for FC Den Bosch and NEC before joining FC Twente. During his FC Twente period he was the captain of the team.

During the 2009 January transfer period he went to Ajax for a transfer fee of 3 million. However, he lost his starting position and was sent on loan to Roda JC at the start of the 2010–11 season. He signed for two seasons with Roda in the summer of 2011. After his contract had expired in 2013, Wielaert was released.

=== Career with Melbourne Heart, Melbourne City (2013–2015) ===
In June 2013, Wielaert was signed by Australian club Melbourne Heart in the A-League. The Dutchman had never played outside of the Netherlands and was optimistic about playing in Australia:

"I have played all of my career in the Netherlands and now it is an exciting time to play abroad. So when Melbourne Heart contacted me, I was enthusiastic immediately. The club sounds great, the city and the country too, so I am looking forward to giving everything for this club and the people around it."

Wielaert scored his first goal for his new club and was the opening goal in the Melbourne Derby against Melbourne Victory on 25 October 2014 in front of 43,729 fans. City went on to lose the match 5–2.

On 13 April 2015, Wielaert was released by the club.

== Coaching career ==
Upon retiring, Wielaert commenced his coaching education, and as of 2018 is assistant coach at Box Hill United, whilst studying for his B-License.

== Career statistics ==
Appearances and goals by club, season and competition
Season	Club	Competition	Apps	Goals
PSV Eindhoven	1997–98	Eredivisie	1	0
PSV Eindhoven	1998–99	Eredivisie	0	0
PSV Eindhoven	1999–2000	Eredivisie	6	0
PSV Eindhoven	Total		7	0
FC Den Bosch	1999–2000	Eredivisie	20	0
FC Den Bosch	2000–01	Eerste Divisie	33	2
FC Den Bosch	Total		53	2
PSV Eindhoven	2001–02	Eredivisie	3	0
NEC	2001–02	Eredivisie	25	1
NEC	2002–03	Eredivisie	32	3
NEC	2003–04	Eredivisie	32	4
NEC	2004–05	Eredivisie	27	2
NEC	2005–06	Eredivisie	29	1
NEC	Total		145	11
FC Twente	2006–07	Eredivisie	34	2
FC Twente	2007–08	Eredivisie	32	1
FC Twente	2008–09	Eredivisie	17	0
FC Twente	Total		83	3
Ajax	2008–09	Eredivisie	16	1
Ajax	2009–10	Eredivisie	3	0
Ajax	Total		19	1
Roda JC	2010–11	Eredivisie	30	1
Roda JC	2011–12	Eredivisie	27	1
Roda JC	2012–13	Eredivisie	20	0
Roda JC	Total		47	2
Melbourne City (Note: Known as "Melbourne Heart" until 2014)	2013–14	A-League	26	0
Melbourne City	2014–15	A-League	11	1
Melbourne City	Total		37	1
Career total			424	20
