= 2013–14 Adelaide United FC season =

Adelaide United
2013–14 season
- Chairman: Greg Griffin
- Manager: Josep Gombau
- Stadium: Coopers Stadium, Adelaide
- A-League: 6th
- Top goalscorer: Jerónimo Neumann, Fábio Ferreira (9)
Home colours	Away colours

The 2013–14 Adelaide United FC season was the club's ninth A-League season. It included the 2013–14 A-League season as well as other competitions of the 2013–14 football (soccer) season.

In the winter transfer window, newly appointed manager Josep Gombau was quick to add Spanish flavour into the squad. He brought in fellow Spaniards Sergio Cirio and Isaías. He also added other players including Tarek Elrich and Steven Lustica, Michael Zullo for a season long loan and Brent McGrath as a four-week injury replacement player. Awer Mabil and Jordan Elsey were also promoted from the youth system, each rewarded with two-year contracts. The club also let four contracts expire; those of Iain Ramsay, Tomi Juric, Fabian Barbiero and Evan Kostopoulos. Iain Fyfe and Zenon Caravella both had their contracts cut short and terminated. Sergio van Dijk was transferred to Persib Bandung and Dario Vidošić to FC Sion for a reported $700,000 transfer fee.

The Reds had a shaky start to their season under new manager Gombau. They had only a single win in their first nine games for the season and early calls started for the club to show the door to the new man in charge. Gombau quickly changed the club's fortunes, getting his second win in round 10 against the Central Coast Mariners, with a 4–0 result. The team continued this form to finish sixth on the table after the 27 home-and-away games, which let them into the finals by two points. Adelaide's season was ended by Central Coast in the elimination final, losing 1–0.

The Reds' highest attendance in the 2013–14 season was 16,504 in the round 2 clash with Melbourne Victory at Hindmarsh Stadium which ended in a 2–2 draw.

== Players ==
=== Squad information ===
N	Pos.	Nat.	Name	Age	Since	App	Goals	Ends	Transfer fee	Notes
1	GK	(Australia)	Galeković (captain)	45	2007	199	0	2014	Free	
2	RB	(Australia)	Marrone	39	2014	35	0	2015	Free	
3	CB	(Australia)	Boogaard	40	2010	85	2	2014	Free	
4	CB	(Australia)	McKain	44	2011	55	1	2014	Free	
5	CM	(Australia)	Malik	36	2011	77	2	2015	Free	Originally from Youth System
6	LWB	(Brazil)	Cássio (vice-captain)	46	2007	158	11	2015	Free	Second nationality: Australia
7	WI	(Argentina)	Jerónimo	40	2012	51	17	2015	Free	
8	LM	(Spain)	Isaías	39	2013	25	0	2015	Free	
9	WI	(Spain)	Cirio	41	2013	21	8	2015	Free	
10	LW	(Argentina)	Carrusca	43	2012	44	11	2014	Free	
11	ST	(Australia)	Djite	39	2011	107	24	2015	Free	
14	CM	(Australia)	Watson	39	2010	97	0	2015	Free	
15	CM	(Australia)	Melling	31	2012	10	0	2015	Youth system	
16	RWB	(Australia)	Bowles	35	2012	23	1	2014	Free	
17	WI	(Australia)	Mabil	31	2012	24	2	2015	Youth system	
18	LB	(Australia)	Zullo	38	2013	21	0	2014	Loan	
19	AM	(Australia)	Barker-Daish	33	2012	19	2	2014	Free	
20	GK	(Australia)	Izzo	31	2012	3	0	2015	Youth system	
21	RB	(Australia)	Elrich	39	2013	25	0	2015	Free	
22	RW	(Portugal)	Ferreira	37	2012	41	12	2015	Free	
23	CB	(Australia)	Elsey	32	2013	9	1	2015	Youth system	
24	ST	(Australia)	McGrath	35	2013	2	0	2013	Free	Four week injury replacement
25	RW	(Australia)	Kitto	32	2013	2	0	2015	Youth system	
	AM	(Australia)	Kamara	30	2012	4	0	2015	Youth system	Second nationality: Liberia

- Last updated: 10 April 2014
- Source: Adelaide United FC, A-League Stats, Players in / out, Wikipedia players' articles
- Ordered by squad number.
- Notes: League appearances and goals listed (including Finals)

== Transfers ==
=== Re-signed ===
Name	Position	Duration	Contract Expiry	Notes
Cássio	Defender	2 years	2015	
Jerónimo Neumann	Forward	2 years	2015	
Fábio Ferreira	Midfielder	2 years	2015	
Bruce Djite	Forward	2 years	2015	
Cameron Watson	Midfielder	2 years	2015	
Awer Mabil	Forward	2 years	2017	
Marcelo Carrusca	Winger	1 year	2015	

=== Winter ===
==== In ====
Name	Position	Moving from	Notes
Jordan Elsey	Defender	Adelaide United Youth	2-year contract.
Awer Mabil	Forward	Adelaide United Youth	2-year contract.
Sergio Cirio	Forward	Hospitalet	2-year contract.
Isaías Sánchez	Midfielder	Ponferradina	2-year contract.
Tarek Elrich	Defender	Western Sydney Wanderers	2-year contract.
Michael Zullo	Defender	Utrecht	1-year loan contract.
Steven Lustica	Midfielder	Hajduk Split	1-year contract.
Brent McGrath	Forward	Brøndby IF	Four week injury replacement.

==== Out ====
Name	Position	Moving to	Notes
Sergio van Dijk	Forward	Persib Bandung	Transferred in January 2013.
Zenon Caravella	Midfielder	Newcastle Jets	Released from remainder of contract in January 2013.
Iain Ramsay	Midfielder	Melbourne Heart	Contract was not renewed.
Tomi Juric	Forward	Western Sydney Wanderers	Contract was not renewed.
Fabian Barbiero	Midfielder	Released	Contract was not renewed.
Evan Kostopoulos	Forward	Released	Contract was not renewed.
Iain Fyfe	Defender	Mes Kerman	Released from remainder of contract in August 2013.
Dario Vidošić	Midfielder	Sion	Reported transfer fee of $700,000.

=== Summer ===
==== In ====
Name	Position	Moving from	Notes
Ryan Griffiths	Forward	Beijing Baxy	0.5 year contract.
Michael Marrone	Defender	Shanghai Shenxin	1.5 year contract.

==== Out ====
Name	Position	Moving to	Notes
Antony Golec	Defender	Western Sydney Wanderers	Released from remainder of contract in January 2014.
Steven Lustica	Midfielder	Brisbane Roar	Released from remainder of contract in February 2014.
Ryan Griffiths	Midfielder	Sarawak FA	Released from remainder of contract in March 2014.

== Player statistics ==
=== Squad stats ===
				Total				A-League		A-League Finals		
N	Pos.	Name	Nat.	GS	App	Gls	Min	App	Gls	App	Gls	Notes
1	GK	Galeković	(Australia)									(−) means goals conceded
3	DF	Boogaard	(Australia)									
4	DF	McKain	(Australia)									
5	MF	Malik	(Australia)									
6	DF	Cássio	(Brazil)									
7	FW	Jerónimo	(Argentina)									
8	MF	Isaías	(Spain)									
9	FW	Cirio	(Spain)									
10	MF	Carrusca	(Argentina)									
11	FW	Djite	(Australia)									
12	DF	Golec	(Australia)									
13	MF	Lustica	(Australia)									
14	MF	Watson	(Australia)									
15	MF	Melling	(Australia)									
16	DF	Bowles	(Australia)									
17	FW	Mabil	(Australia)									
18	DF	Zullo	(Australia)									
19	MF	Barker-Daish	(Australia)									
20	GK	Izzo	(Australia)									(−) means goals conceded
21	DF	Elrich	(Australia)									
22	MF	Ferreira	(Portugal)									
23	DF	Elsey	(Australia)									
25	MF	Kitto	(Australia)									
	MF	Kamara	(Australia)									

Last updated: 19 September 2013
Source: Soccerway – Adelaide United 2012/13
Ordered by shirt number
0 shown as blank

=== Scorers ===
==== A-League ====
Goals	Player	1	2	3	4	5	6	7	8	9	10	11	12	13	14	15	16	17	18	19	20	21	22	23	24	25	26	27
9	(Argentina) Jerónimo Neumann	2	1								1				1				1			2	1					
9	(Portugal) Fábio Ferreira	1				1					1			1					1	1		1			1		1	
8	(Spain) Sergio Cirio		1						1		1										3	1			1			
6	(Argentina) Marcelo Carrusca				1				1							1				1						1	1	
5	(Australia) Bruce Djite										1		1				1		1						1			
2	(Australia) Osama Malik						1			1																		
2	(Australia) Awer Mabil																	1				1						
1	(Australia) Steven Lustica								1																			
1	(Australia) Jake Barker-Daish													1														
1	(Australia) Jordan Elsey														1													
1	(Australia) Ryan Griffiths																1											

A goal was scored from a penalty kick	Two goals were scored from penalty kicks	Player did not play

== Club ==
=== Coaching staff ===
Position	Staff
Head coach	(Spain) Josep Gombau
Assistant & Fitness coach	(Spain) Pau Martí
Assistant coach	(Australia) Michael Valkanis
High Performance Manager	(Australia) Adam Hewitt
Goalkeeper coach	(Australia) Peter Blazincic
Physiotherapist	(Australia) Peter Chitti

Source:Football Australia

=== Managerial Changes ===
Outgoing manager	Manner of departure	Date of vacancy	Table	Incoming manager	Date of appointment	Table
(Australia) Michael Valkanis	Reassigned as assistant coach.	8 April 2013	4th, (12–13)	(Spain) Josep Gombau	30 April 2013	Pre-season (13–14)

=== Attendance at home games ===
Round	Date	Opponent	Score AUFC – Away	Attendance	Weekday
1	13 October 2013	Perth Glory	3–1	10,320	Sunday
2	18 October 2013	Melbourne Victory	2–2	16,504	Friday
5	9 November 2013	Newcastle Jets	1–2	10,244	Saturday
9	6 December 2013	Brisbane Roar	1–2	8,861	Friday
10	14 December 2013	Central Coast Mariners	4–0	7,785	Saturday
12	29 December 2013	Newcastle Jets	1–0	10,778	Sunday
13	3 January 2014	Sydney FC	2–2	15,347	Friday
15	19 January 2014	Western Sydney Wanderers	1–0	11,365	Sunday
16	25 January 2014	Melbourne Heart	2–2	11,100	Saturday
19	14 February 2014	Central Coast Mariners	2–0	6,980	Thursday
21	2 March 2014	Wellington Phoenix	5–1	8,596	Sunday
24	21 March 2014	Sydney FC	3–1	14,212	Friday
26	4 April 2014	Melbourne Heart	2–2	13,845	Friday

== Pre-season and friendlies ==
Kick-off times are in ACST/ACDT.

30 July 2013	Cumberland United	1–4	Adelaide United	Santos Stadium, Mile End
Tuesday 20:00	A. Rideout 27'	Report	34', 52', 68' Jerónimo; 58' Golec

6 August 2013	MetroStars	1–2	Adelaide United	Santos Stadium, Mile End
Tuesday 20:00	Deegan 80'	Report	21' Mabil; 76' Barker-Daish

9 August 2013	Croydon Kings	1–7	Adelaide United	Santos Stadium, Mile End
Friday 20:00	McGreevy 32' (pen.)	Report	16', 74' Djite; 62' Barker-Daish; 67', 69' Jerónimo; 85' Carrusca; 88' McKain

13 August 2013	West Torrens Birkalla	1–8	Adelaide United	Coopers Stadium, Adelaide
Tuesday 19:00	Nagel 67'	Report; Report	13', 19', 79' Djite; 21' Cirio; 29', 30' Jerónimo; 50', 64' D. Smith	Attendance: Closed to the public

19 August 2013	Western Strikers	0–11	Adelaide United	Coopers Stadium, Adelaide
Monday 19:00		Report; Report	12', 55', 59' Cirio; 32' (o.g.) Lastella; 45', 51' Djite; 50' Mileusnić; 62' Ochieng; 70' B. Appiah; 83', 86' Barker-Daish	Attendance: Closed to the public

27 August 2013	Adelaide Comets	0–3	Adelaide United	Santos Stadium, Mile End
Tuesday 20:00		Report	59' Cirio; 69' Jerónimo; 82' Mabil

12 September 2013	Adelaide United	0–1	Central Coast Mariners	Coopers Stadium, Adelaide
Thursday 15:30		Report	58' (o.g.) Elsey

22 September 2013	Western Sydney Wanderers	1–1	Adelaide United	Centrebet Stadium, Penrith
Sunday 13:30	Boogaard 6' (o.g.)	Report	47' Cirio

27 September 2013	Melbourne Heart	1–2	Adelaide United	Epping Stadium, Melbourne
Friday 14:00	Williams 65'	Report	26' (pen.), 33' Carrusca

3 October 2013	Melbourne Victory	1–2	Adelaide United	AAMI Park, Melbourne
Thursday	Barbarouses 83'	Report	Jerónimo 23'; Elrich 72'	Attendance: Closed to the public Referee: Shaun Evans

== Competitions ==
=== Overall ===
Competition	Started round	Current position / round	Final position / round	First match	Last match
A-League	—	—	6th	12 October 2013	11 April 2014

=== A-League ===
==== League table ====
Pos	Team	Pld	W	D	L	GF	GA	GD	Pts	Qualification
1	Brisbane Roar (C)	27	16	4	7	43	25	+18	52	Qualificaition for 2015 AFC Champions League group stage and finals series
2	Western Sydney Wanderers	27	11	9	7	34	29	+5	42	Qualificaition for 2015 AFC Champions League group stage and finals series
3	Central Coast Mariners	27	12	6	9	33	36	−3	42	Qualification for 2015 AFC Champions League qualifying play-off and finals series (Note: Since the winner of 2014 A-League Grand Final (Brisbane Roar) qualified for the 2015 AFC Champions League group stage, the 2nd and 3rd placed teams qualified for the group stage and the qualifying play-off of 2015 AFC Champions League.)
4	Melbourne Victory	27	11	8	8	42	43	−1	41	Qualification for Finals series
5	Sydney FC	27	12	3	12	40	38	+2	39	Qualification for Finals series
6	Adelaide United	27	10	8	9	45	36	+9	38	Qualification for Finals series
7	Newcastle Jets	27	10	6	11	34	34	0	36	
8	Perth Glory	27	7	7	13	28	37	−9	28	
9	Wellington Phoenix (Note: Wellington Phoenix cannot qualify for the AFC Champions League as they are not recognised as an AFC club.)	27	7	7	13	36	51	−15	28	
10	Melbourne Heart	27	6	8	13	36	42	−6	26	

Updated to match(es) played on 13 April 2014. Source: ultimatealeague.com
Rules for classification: 1) points; 2) goal difference; 3) number of goals scored.
(C) Champions

==== Results summary ====
Overall								Home						Away					
Pld	W	D	L	GF	GA	GD	Pts	W	D	L	GF	GA	GD	W	D	L	GF	GA	GD
26	11	7	8	45	34	+11	40	8	3	2	29	15	+14	3	4	6	16	19	−3

Last updated: 30 March 2014.
Source: Competitive Matches

==== Results by round ====
Round	1	2	3	4	5	6	7	8	9	10	11	12	13	14	15	16	17	18	19	20	21	22	23	24	25	26	27
Ground	H	H	A	A	H	A	A	A	H	H	A	H	H	A	H	H	A	A	H	A	H	A	A	H	A	H	A
Result	W	D	L	L	L	D	L	D	L	W	D	W	D	W	W	D	L	W	W	L	W	L	D	W	W	D	L
Position	1	2	5	6	8	8	8	8	8	8	8	7	8	8	5	6	6	5	3	5	3	5	6	5	4	4	6

Updated to match(es) played on 30 March 2014. Source: Fixtures
A = Away; H = Home; W = Win; D = Draw; L = Loss

==== Matches ====
Kick-off times are in ACST/ACDT.

13 October 2013 1	Adelaide United	3–1	Perth Glory	Coopers Stadium, Adelaide
Sunday 16:30	Jerónimo 9', 25'; F. Ferreira 64'; Isaías (yellow card) 40' (red card) 65'; Boogaard (yellow card) 53' (red card) 79'	Report	Nagai 11'	Attendance: 10,320; Referee: Ben Williams

18 October 2013 2	Adelaide United	2–2	Melbourne Victory	Coopers Stadium, Adelaide
Friday 19:00	Cirio 21' (pen.); Jerónimo 25'	Report	Finkler 79'; Troisi 90+3'	Attendance: 16,504; Referee: Alan Milliner

26 October 2013 3	Central Coast Mariners	1–0	Adelaide United	Bluetongue Stadium, Gosford
Saturday 17:00	Fitzgerald 2'	Report		Attendance: 9,109; Referee: Peter Green

1 November 2013 4	Western Sydney Wanderers	2–1	Adelaide United	Pirtek Stadium, Parramatta
Friday 19:00	Juric 60', 80'	Report	Carrusca 54'	Attendance: 16,279; Referee: Jarred Gillett

9 November 2013 5	Adelaide United	1–2	Newcastle Jets	Coopers Stadium, Adelaide
Saturday 17:00	F. Ferrieira 71'; Boogaard (red card) 90'	Report	Jaliens 41'; Taggart 52'	Attendance: 10,244; Referee: Strebre Delovski

16 November 2013 6	Perth Glory	1–1	Adelaide United	nib Stadium, Perth
Saturday 17:00	Harold 69'	Report	Malik 52'	Attendance: 8,574; Referee: Shaun Evans

23 November 2013 7	Melbourne Victory	3–0	Adelaide United	Etihad Stadium, Melbourne
Saturday 19:15	Barbarouses 14'; Leijer (yellow card) 35' (yellow-red card) 45+1'; A. Thompson 68'; Nichols 76'	Report		Attendance: 20,064; Referee: Ben Williams

1 December 2013 8	Melbourne Heart	3–3	Adelaide United	AAMI Park, Melbourne
Sunday 16:30	Migliorini 54', 66'; Williams 71' (pen.)	Report	Lustica 4'; Cirio 15'; Carrusca 77'	Attendance: 6,002; Referee: Strebre Delovski

6 December 2013 9	Adelaide United	1–2	Brisbane Roar	Coopers Stadium, Adelaide
Friday 19:00	Malik 7'	Report	Berisha 21' (pen.), 72'	Attendance: 8,861; Referee: Peter O'Leary

14 December 2013 10	Adelaide United	4–0	Central Coast Mariners	Coopers Stadium, Adelaide
Saturday 17:00	Djite 25'; F. Ferreira 40'; Cirio 54'; Jerónimo 90'	Report		Attendance: 7,785; Referee: Ben Williams

22 December 2013 11	Perth Glory	0–0	Adelaide United	nib Stadium, Perth
Sunday 18:30		Report		Attendance: 9,436; Referee: Alan Milliner

29 December 2013 12	Adelaide United	1–0	Newcastle Jets	Coopers Stadium, Adelaide
Sunday 16:30	Djite 26'	Report		Attendance: 10,778; Referee: Chris Beath

3 January 2014 13	Adelaide United	2–2	Sydney FC	Coopers Stadium, Adelaide
Friday 19:00	F. Ferreira 24'; Barker-Daish 72' (pen.)	Report	Despotović 9'; Carle (yellow card) 45' (red card) 68'; Gameiro 82'	Attendance: 15,437; Referee: Strebre Delovski

11 January 2014 14	Brisbane Roar	1–2	Adelaide United	Suncorp Stadium, Brisbane
Saturday 17:00	D. Ferreira (yellow card) 11' (red card) 40'; Berisha 80'	Report	Jerónimo 21'; Elsey 90+2'	Attendance: 17,953; Referee: Alan Milliner

19 January 2014 15	Adelaide United	1–0	Western Sydney Wanderers	Coopers Stadium, Adelaide
Sunday 16:30	Carrusca 4'	Report		Attendance: 11,356; Referee: Peter Green

25 January 2014 16	Adelaide United	2–2	Melbourne Heart	Coopers Stadium, Adelaide
Saturday 17:00	Djite 22'; Ry. Griffiths 90'	Report	Kewell 61' (pen.); Kisnorbo 68'	Attendance: 11,100; Referee: Kris Griffiths-Jones

1 February 2014 17	Wellington Phoenix	2–1	Adelaide United	Eden Park, Auckland
Saturday 17:00	Hernández 22'; Cunningham 44'	Report	Mabil 90+3'	Attendance: 18,506; Referee: Peter Green

8 February 2014 18	Sydney FC	0–3	Adelaide United	Allianz Stadium, Sydney
Saturday 19:00		Report	Djite 16'; F. Ferreira 27'; Jerónimo 80'	Attendance: 13,335; Referee: Alan Milliner

14 February 2014 19	Adelaide United	2–0	Central Coast Mariners	Coopers Stadium, Adelaide
Friday 19:00	Carrusca 33'; F. Ferreira 45+1'	Report		Attendance: 6,980; Referee: Kris Griffiths-Jones

22 February 2014 20	Melbourne Victory	4–3	Adelaide United	AAMI Park, Melbourne
Saturday 19:00	Finkler 15', 56'; A. Thompson 66'; Barbarouses 75'	Report	Cirio 3', 45', 83'	Attendance: 18,341; Referee: Kris Griffiths-Jones

27 February 2014 21	Adelaide United	5–1	Wellington Phoenix	Coopers Stadium, Adelaide
Thursday 19:00; Rescheduled	Jerónimo 23', 62'; Cirio 29'; Ferreira 59'; Mabil 90+2'	Report	Cunningham 67'; Muscat (yellow card) 43' (red card) 73'	Attendance: 8,596; Referee: Lucien Laverdure

9 March 2014 22	Brisbane Roar	2–1	Adelaide United	Suncorp Stadium, Brisbane
Sunday 16:30	Berisha 22', 51'	Report	Jerónimo 90+3'	Attendance: 12,514; Referee: Shaun Evans

15 March 2014 23	Western Sydney Wanderers	0–0	Adelaide United	Pirtek Stadium, Parramatta
Saturday 17:00		Report		Attendance: 11,892; Referee: Strebre Delovski

21 March 2014 24	Adelaide United	3–1	Sydney FC	Coopers Stadium, Adelaide
Friday 19:00	Ferreira 13'; Cirio 54'; Djite 88'	Report	M. Thompson 74'	Attendance: 14,212; Referee: Kris Griffiths-Jones

30 March 2014 25	Wellington Phoenix	0–1	Adelaide United	Westpac Stadium, Wellington
Sunday 12:30		Report	Carrusca 58' (pen.)	Attendance: 6,453; Referee: Peter Green

4 April 2014 26	Adelaide United	2–2	Melbourne Heart	Coopers Stadium, Adelaide
Friday 19:00	Carrusca 1'; Elrich (red card) 35'; Ferreira 90+2'	Report	Williams 33' (pen.); Dugandžić 42'	Attendance: 13,845; Referee: Ben Williams

11 April 2014 27	Newcastle Jets	2–0	Adelaide United	Hunter Stadium, Newcastle
Friday 19:00	J. Griffiths 21'; Taggart 90'	Report		Attendance: 11,226; Referee: Peter O'Leary

==== Finals series ====
19 April 2014 Elimination-finals	Central Coast Mariners	1–0	Adelaide United	Central Coast Stadium, Gosford
Saturday 16:30 AEST	Ibini-Isei 67'			Attendance: 9,045; Referee: Ben Williams

== Awards ==
- Player of the Week (Round 10) – Sergio Cirio
- Player of the Week (Round 20) – Sergio Cirio
- Player of the Week (Round 21) – Fábio Ferreira
- Player of the Week (Round 24) – Marcelo Carrusca
