= 2012–13 Adelaide United FC season =

Adelaide United
2012–13 season
- Chairman: Greg Griffin
- Head Coach (Interim): Michael Valkanis
- Stadium: Hindmarsh Stadium, Adelaide
- A-League: 4th
- AFC Champions League: Quarter-finals
- A-League Finals: Elimination finals
- Top goalscorer: League: Dario Vidošić (10); All: Dario Vidošić (10)
- Highest home attendance: 14,115 (vs Melbourne Victory, 7 December 2012)
- Lowest home attendance: 6,878 (vs Brisbane Roar, 2 March 2013)
- Average home league attendance: 9,793
Home colours	Away colours

The 2012–13 Adelaide United FC season was the club's eighth A-League season. It includes the 2012–13 A-League season as well as any other competitions of the 2012–13 football season, including the 2012 AFC Champions League. Adelaide United will compete in the continental competition for the fourth time, progressing past the Group Stage by topping the group for the third time, thus making the club the most successful Australian club in Asia.

Adelaide United's 2012–13 season was John Kosmina's first full season as permanent coach since being appointed in a caretaker role from Rini Coolen in December 2011. The season was also Kosmina's first in charge at Adelaide since the 2006–7 season. The offseason and preseason saw the signings of Fábio Ferreira from Sydney-based Dulwich Hill FC, Marcelo Carrusca, Daniel Bowles and Jake Barker-Daish. The club begin a new deal with kit supplier Kappa and local solar panel firm Unleash Solar, who joined the club as front-of-kit sponsor.

The club's home and away season began away to Newcastle Jets on 7 October 2012 just four days after being eliminated from the 2012 Asian Champions League. The match saw Adelaide win 2–0, with goals from Dario Vidosic and Iain Ramsay, as well as the debuts of Ferreira, Carrusca, Bowles and Barker-Daish for Adelaide. Adelaide followed this up a week later with a 1–0 win over Western Sydney Wanderers FC in their first away trip, the lone goal to Neumann, thus dealing Western Sydney their first loss and first goal conceded. In Round 3 Adelaide played Melbourne Victory at Etihad Stadium on 19 October. Despite gaining a lead early in the second half through a Vidosic penalty, Melbourne Victory scored two goals for their first win of the season, and Adelaide's first loss.

Adelaide United responded to the loss in kind the following round at home, coming from a goal down to defeat Wellington Phoenix 3–1 in Cássio's 100th A-League match. Aptly, he scored, as did Neumann. In Round 5 Adelaide travelled to Brisbane, continuing their good form at Suncorp Stadium. Dario Vidosic scored from a free kick in just the third minute. Adelaide successfully defended the lead and won the match 1–0, with much notable praise heaped on goalkeeper and captain Eugene Galekovic. Adelaide returned home for a Remembrance Day match against Perth Glory. Perth scored the opening goal, but Adelaide equalised through Vidosic. The match ended 1–1. A week later Adelaide recorded another 1–0 success, this time over Melbourne Heart. Again, the lone scorer was Neumann.

By this point Adelaide had earned its position at the top of the A-League ladder, with five wins, one draw and just one loss. A trip to Sydney at Allianz Stadium on 23 November saw a sixth win against Sydney FC. Ferreira scored his first goal for the club before Yairo Yau equalised. Vidosic struck home the winner in the 88th minute, Adelaide winning 2–1 and continuing Sydney FC's poor form. United's next match was at Bluetongue Stadium against Central Coast Mariners. Eugene Galekovic and Dario Vidosic had been selected to compete for Australia in the East Asian Cup, and therefore did not play the match. However, Vidosic gained an injury and consequently remained in Australia, though he missed the match. Paul Izzo made his debut in place of Eugene Galekovic, becoming the 100th-ever player to make an appearance for Adelaide United. Adelaide gained the lead through Bruce Djite in the 17th minute and led at half-time, but the goal was not enough and Central Coast scored two goals in the second half to hand Adelaide just its second loss in eight games.

A week later Adelaide hosted Melbourne Victory on 7 December. Over 14,000 fans attended, and it proved to be one of the most-watched matches of the season. The match indirectly attracted controversy when reports surfaced of apparent massive, multimillion-dollar bets being placed on the game. Adelaide defeated Melbourne Victory 4–2. Evan Kostopoulos scored his first ever A-League goals, netting a brace, with Ferriera and Carrusca adding to Adelaide's tally. Carrusca scored an astonishing effort, striking the ball with his first touch on the right flank it curved to the inside left of the goal, around Melbourne Victory goalkeeper Nathan Coe. A week later Adelaide notched an eighth win for the season, again defeating Wellington Phoenix 3–1, with a brace to Carrusca and a goal by Ferreira. The final action of the match saw Eugene Galekovic save a penalty, and then athletically save the rebound.

Cameron Watson, Bruce Djite, Cassio, Jeronimo Neumann and Fabio Ferreira each extended their contracts for a further two years. Round 12 saw Adelaide make a first-ever trip to Parramatta Stadium on 21 December. Western Sydney Wanderers had previously been somewhat scrutinised for a lack of goalscoring form, but on this occasion defeated Adelaide 6–1. On Boxing Day Adelaide hosted Brisbane Roar, losing 1–0. The match was Adelaide's first home loss and first match without scoring in the season. United rebounded on New Year's Eve, hosting Sydney FC and winning 3–0. Vidosic scored a brace with Ramsay netting the final goal. United followed this with a 0–0 draw in hot, dry conditions at Newcastle. On 11 January 2013, Adelaide United hosted Perth Glory. Some tension had been brewing between supporters and stadium security, as well as with the club itself. Both supporter groups staged a silent protest, with the issue being given significant media attention on internet and radio, citing disconnect with the club and heavy-handedness by security staff. At the conclusion of the protest, the stadium erupted to rapturous applause. Adelaide went on to defeat Perth 3–2.

Adelaide United lost its next three matches. Firstly was a 2–0 loss away to Melbourne Heart, and subsequently a 3–1 loss away to Central Coast Mariners (despite, again, gaining the lead before half-time). John Kosmina had expressed his desire to the club for a two-year extension to his contract, and rumours publicly emerged of assistant coach Michael Valkanis being offered a contract extension, but not Kosmina. Kosmina resigned as head coach shortly thereafter. Valkanis was appointed as interim coach until the end of the season, with former Adelaide City FC player Sergio Melta being appointed as his assistant. Valkanis' first match in charge saw Adelaide lose 2–4 at home to Western Sydney, but a week later delivered a resounding 1–0 win over Melbourne Victory, Jeronimo Neumann once more the lone goalscorer. The triumph ended Victory's run of form, who subsequently struggled for positive results for the remainder of the season.

Unleash Solar collapsed and went into administration, eventually dissolving. This left the club with no front-of-shirt sponsor. Adelaide announced the signing of Tomi Juric on a short-term deal until the conclusion of the season. Adelaide won just one of its remaining matches, a 2–0 away win over Melbourne Heart. Finishing the season in fourth place, United hosted Brisbane Roar in an elimination final, but lost 1–2, thereby ending Adelaide's season.

== Season overview ==
It was announced on 1 December 2011 that as part of the AFC Champions League review conducted earlier in the year, Australia would be granted an extra play-off slot for the 2012 edition of the competition. Adelaide United placed 3rd in the 2010–11 A-League season and thus gained entry into the Play-off stage of the competition, alongside Champions Brisbane Roar and Runners-Up Central Coast Mariners who qualified directly into the Group Stage. Due to the Chinese and Indonesian clubs' withdrawal from the play-offs, Adelaide were fortunate enough to be drawn directly into the Group Stage of the 2012 AFC Champions League without the need to progress through the preliminary stages. The club was drawn into Group E alongside former opponents, Gamba Osaka, Bunyodkor and Pohang Steelers.

=== February ===
In an unprecedented turn of events, the Court of Arbitration for Sport ruled in favour of rebel Indonesian club Persipura Jayapura’s appeal for inclusion in the competition and revoked Adelaide's direct entry into the group stage and a play-off match was reinstated to determine the club to progress to Group E.

Adelaide United hosted the Indonesian club on 16 February, and convincingly won the game 3–0, therefore removing all doubt of the club's right to enter the continental competition for the Australian club record 4th time.

=== March ===
On 6 March, Adelaide United travelled to Tashkent, Uzbekistan for Match Day 1 of the Champions League, and returned with a 2–1 win in sub-zero conditions against reigning Uzbek champions, Bunyodkor.

Former Asian champions, Gamba Osaka made the trip to Hindmarsh Stadium for Match Day 2 on 20 March. Adelaide United came out the victors with a first half brace from Daniel Mullen being the difference.

On the back of the club's win over Gamba Osaka, interim head coach John Kosmina was signed on for a further season as the club's manager on 22 March.

=== April ===
Match Day 3 saw Adelaide United travel to the home of Pohang Steelers on 3 April, where a rare defensive error from Adelaide captain and goalkeeper Eugene Galeković gifted the home side the sole goal of the contest, and the three points.

The return leg was played in Adelaide two weeks later, where again a lone goal decided the tie. On 18 April, Adelaide United kept its second clean sheet of the AFC Champions League group stage when Bruce Djite scored in the 90th minute to send the Australian club clear at the top of Group E.

=== July ===
The club announced a new 2-year partnership with kit supplier Kappa on 16 July, after it dissolved its previous contract with Erreà after the company's failure to deliver products to the club's expectations.

=== August ===
Without Coopers Brewery as primary major sponsor, Adelaide United were forced into securing an alternative major sponsor. On 29 August, the club announced a one-year front-of-shirt sponsorship partnership with Unleash Solar worth a reported $250,000.

== Players ==
=== Squad information ===
N	Pos.	Nat.	Name	Age	Since	App	Goals	Ends	Transfer fee	Notes
1	GK	(Australia)	Galeković (captain)	45	2007	127	0	2014	Free	
2	CM	(Australia)	Malik	36	2011	44	0	2015	Free	Originally from Youth System
3	CB	(Australia)	Boogaard	40	2010	54	0	2014	Free	
4	CB	(Australia)	McKain	44	2011	26	0	2014	Free	
5	CB	(Australia)	Fyfe	44	2012	75	5	2015	Free	
6	LWB	(Brazil)	Cássio (vice-captain)	46	2007	121	7	2015	Free	Second nationality: Australia
8	LW	(Argentina)	Carrusca	43	2012	23	5	2014	Free	Second nationality: Portugal
10	AM	(Australia)	Vidošić	39	2011	51	15	2014	Free	Australian marquee player
11	ST	(Australia)	Djite	39	2011	78	18	2015	Free	
12	CB	(Australia)	Golec	36	2011	26	1	2014	Free	
13	AM	(Australia)	Kamara	30	2012	1	0	2015	Youth system	Second nationality: Liberia
14	CM	(Australia)	Watson	39	2010	79	0	2015	Free	
15	DM	(Australia)	Melling	31	2012	9	0	2015	Youth system	
16	RWB	(Australia)	Bowles	35	2012	16	1	2014	Free	
17	LW	(Philippines)	Ramsay	38	2010	83	11	2013	Free	Second nationality: Australia
18	CM	(Australia)	Barbiero	42	2007	89	8	2013	Free	
19	AM	(Australia)	Barker-Daish	33	2012	11	1	2014	Free	
20	GK	(Australia)	Izzo	31	2012	3	0	2015	Youth system	
21	CF	(Argentina)	Jerónimo	40	2012	26	7	2015	Free	
22	RW	(Portugal)	Ferreira	37	2012	19	3	2015	Free	
23	WI	(Australia)	Kostopoulos	36	2012	21	2	2013	Youth system	
24	WI	(Kenya)	Mabil	31	2012	5	0	2015	Youth system	Second nationality: Australia
25	FW	(Australia)	Juric	35	2013	7	2	2013	Loan	

- Last updated: 8 April 2013
- Source: Adelaide United FC, Players in / out, Wikipedia players' articles
- Ordered by squad number.
- Notes: League appearances and goals listed (including Finals)

=== From the youth system ===
Note: Flags indicate national team as defined under FIFA eligibility rules; some limited exceptions apply. Players may hold more than one non-FIFA nationality.

No.	Pos.	Nation	Player
24	FW	KEN	Awer Mabil
30	GK	AUS	John Hall

=== Players in / out ===
Re-signed

Name	Position	Duration	Contract Expiry	Notes
(Australia) Antony Golec	Defender	2 years	2014	
(Australia) Nigel Boogaard	Defender	2 years	2014	
(Australia) Osama Malik	Midfielder	2 years	2015	

In (Pre-season)

Name	Position	Moving from	Notes
(Australia) Teeboy Kamara	Midfielder	(Australia) Adelaide United (Youth)	3-year contract.
(Australia) Iain Fyfe	Defender	(South Korea) Busan IPark	1-year contract.
(Australia) Daniel Bowles	Defender	(Australia) Gold Coast United	2-year contract.
(Australia) Jake Barker-Daish	Midfielder	(Australia) Gold Coast United	2-year contract.
(Australia) Evan Kostopoulos	Forward	(Australia) Adelaide United (Youth)	1-year contract.
(Argentina) Marcelo Carrusca	Midfielder	(Argentina) San Martín de San Juan	2-year contract.
(Portugal) Fábio Ferreira	Midfielder	(Australia) Dulwich Hill	1-year contract.
(Argentina) Jerónimo Neumann	Forward	(Paraguay) Sol de América	1-year loan contract.

In (Mid-season)

Name	Position	Moving from	Notes
(Australia) Tomi Juric	Forward	(Croatia) Inter Zaprešić	Loan contract until end of season.

Out (Pre-season)

Name	Position	Moving to	Notes
(Australia) Mark Birighitti	Goalkeeper	(Australia) Newcastle Jets	2-year contract commences after 2012 AFC Champions League group stage
(Australia) Milan Susak	Defender	(China) Tianjin Teda	Transferred in February 2012; Reported transfer fee of $200,000
(Ukraine) Evgeniy Levchenko	Midfielder	Released	Contract was not renewed.
(Australia) Spase Dilevski	Midfielder	(Australia) Melbourne Victory	Contract was not renewed.
(Portugal) Ricardo da Silva	Midfielder	Released	Contract was not renewed.
(Australia) Daniel Mullen	Defender	(China) Dalian Aerbin	Transferred in July 2012; Transfer fee of $240,000.
(Uruguay) Francisco Usúcar	Midfielder	(Ecuador) Técnico Universitario	Transferred in July 2012

Out (Mid-season)

Name	Position	Moving to	Notes
(Indonesia) Sergio van Dijk	Forward	(Indonesia) Persib Bandung	Transferred in January 2013.
(Australia) Zenon Caravella	Midfielder	(Australia) Newcastle Jets	Released from remainder of contract in January 2013.

== Player statistics ==
=== Squad stats ===
				Total				AFC Champions League		A-League		A-League Finals		
N	Pos.	Name	Nat.	GS	App	Gls	Min	App	Gls	App	Gls	App	Gls	Notes
1	GK	Galeković	(Australia)	35	36	-40	3090	10	-7	25	-31	1	-2	(−) means goals conceded
2	MF	Malik	(Australia)	25	27		2088	7		19		1		
3	DF	Boogaard	(Australia)	31	31	2	2626	9	2	21		1		
4	DF	McKain	(Australia)	16	19	1	1328	8	1	10		1		
5	DF	Fyfe	(Australia)	25	27		2241	5		21		1		
6	DF	Cássio	(Brazil)	34	34	1	2982	9		24	1	1		
8	MF	Carrusca	(Argentina)	19	23	5	1560			22	5	1		
10	MF	Vidošić	(Australia)	35	35	10	2882	9		25	9	1	1	
11	FW	Djite	(Australia)	21	29	3	1662	10	1	18	2	1		
12	DF	Golec	(Australia)	17	17	1	1477	2	1	15				
13	MF	Kamara	(Australia)		3		15	3						(injured) Source
14	MF	Watson	(Australia)	24	31		2272	4		27				
15	MF	Melling	(Australia)		1		15	1						
16	DF	Bowles	(Australia)	16	18	1	1448	2		16	1			
17	MF	Ramsay	(Philippines)	29	37	7	2534	10	2	26	5	1		
18	MF	Barbiero	(Australia)	11	26		1214	10		16				
19	MF	Barker-Daish	(Australia)	4	11	1	448			10	1	1		
20	GK	Izzo	(Australia)	3	3	-6	270			3	-6			(−) means goals conceded
21	FW	Jerónimo	(Argentina)	16	28	8	1440	2	1	25	7	1		
22	MF	Ferreira	(Portugal)	11	19	3	1061			18	3	1		
23	FW	Kostopoulos	(Australia)	17	27	3	1484	9	1	18	2			
24	FW	Mabil	(Kenya)	2	5		160			5				
25	FW	Juric	(Australia)	5	7	2	349			6	2	1		

Last updated: 8 April 2013
Source: Soccerway – Adelaide United 2012/13
Ordered by shirt number
0 shown as blank

==== Delisted players ====
				Total				AFC Champions League		A-League		A-League Finals		
N	Pos.	Name	Nat.	GS	App	Gls	Min	App	Gls	App	Gls	App	Gls	Notes
	MF	Caravella	(Australia)	8	12		738	8		4				Released in January 2013.
	FW	van Dijk	(Indonesia)	4	11	2	500	8	2	3				-Transferred to Persib Bandung in January 2013.

Last updated: 22 January 2013
Source: Soccerway – Adelaide United 2012/13
Ordered by shirt number
0 shown as blank

=== Disciplinary records ===
Includes all competitive matches. The list is sorted by shirt number.

N	P	Nat.	Name	League			Finals			Asia			Others			Total			Notes
N	P	Nat.	Name	Yellow card	Second yellow card	Red card	Yellow card	Second yellow card	Red card	Yellow card	Second yellow card	Red card	Yellow card	Second yellow card	Red card	Yellow card	Second yellow card	Red card	Notes
1	GK	(Australia)	Galeković	4												4			
2	MF	(Australia)	Malik	5		1										5		1	One match suspension against Melbourne Heart in R24.
3	DF	(Australia)	Boogaard	8								1				8		1	One match ACL suspension against Bunyodkor in ACL, QF2.; One match suspension against Melbourne Victory in R20.
4	DF	(Australia)	McKain	4	1											4	1		One match suspension against Brisbane Roar in R23.
5	DF	(Australia)	Fyfe	5			1			1	1					7	1		One match ACL suspension against Newcastle Jets in A-League, R1.; One match suspension against Wellington Phoenix in R22.
6	DF	(Brazil)	Cássio	5			1			1						7			One match suspension against Sydney FC in R21.
7	MF	(Australia)	Caravella							1						1			
8	MF	(Argentina)	Carrusca	4			1									5			
9	FW	(Indonesia)	van Dijk	1												1			
10	MF	(Australia)	Vidošić	4						2						6			
11	FW	(Australia)	Djite	2						1						3			
12	DF	(Australia)	Golec	3												3			
16	DF	(Australia)	Bowles	4						1						5			
17	MF	(Philippines)	Ramsay	2												2			
18	MF	(Australia)	Barbiero	2						1	1					3	1		One match ACL suspension against Newcastle Jets in A-League, R1.
19	MF	(Australia)	Barker-Daish	1												1			
21	FW	(Argentina)	Jerónimo	7			1			1						9			One match suspension against Western Sydney Wanderers in R19.
25	FW	(Portugal)	Ferreira				1									1			
23	MF	(Australia)	Kostopoulos	2						3						5			
25	FW	(Australia)	Juric	1			1									2			

Last updated: 8 April 2013
Source: Competitive matches
Ordered by (red card) , (second yellow card) and (yellow card)
(yellow card) = Number of bookings; (second yellow card) = Number of sending offs after a second yellow card; (red card) = Number of sending offs by a direct red card.

=== Scorers ===
==== AFC Champions League ====
Goals	Player	PO2	MD1	MD2	MD3	MD4	MD5	MD6	R16	QF1	QF2
2	(Australia) Nigel Boogaard	1	1								
2	(Australia) Daniel Mullen			2							
2	(Indonesia) Sergio van Dijk	1						1			
2	(Philippines) Iain Ramsay									1	1
1	(Ukraine) Evgeniy Levchenko	1									
1	(Australia) Antony Golec		1								
1	(Australia) Bruce Djite					1					
1	(Australia) Jon McKain								1		
1	(Australia) Evan Kostopoulos									1	
1	(Argentina) Jerónimo Neumann										1

A goal was scored from a penalty kick	Two goals were scored from penalty kicks	Player did not play

==== A-League ====
Goals	Player	1	2	3	4	5	6	7	8	9	10	11	12	13	14	15	16	17	18	19	20	21	22	23	24	25	26	27	EF
10	(Australia) Dario Vidošić	1		1		1	1		1				1		2										1				1
7	(Argentina) Jerónimo Neumann		1		2			1									2				1								
5	(Australia) Iain Ramsay	1													1		1			1					1				
5	(Argentina) Marcelo Carrusca										1	2											1			1			
3	(Portugal) Fábio Ferreira								1		1	1																	
2	(Australia) Evan Kostopoulos										2																		
2	(Australia) Bruce Djite									1										1									
2	(Australia) Tomi Juric																					1	1						
1	(Brazil) Cássio				1																								
1	(Australia) Daniel Bowles																		1										
1	(Australia) Jake Barker-Daish																											1	

A goal was scored from a penalty kick	Two goals were scored from penalty kicks	Player did not play

== Club ==
=== Coaching staff ===
Position	Staff
Head coach (interim)	(Australia) Michael Valkanis
Assistant coach	(Australia) Sergio Melta
Goalkeeper coach	(Australia) Peter Blazincic
High performance manager	(Australia) Sean Tagg
Physiotherapist	(Australia) Peter Chitti

Last updated: 5 February 2013
Source: Adelaide United FC

=== Managerial Changes ===
Outgoing manager	Manner of departure	Date of vacancy	Table	Incoming manager	Date of appointment	Table
(Australia) John Kosmina	Resigned.	28 January 2013	4th, Round 18 (12–13)	(Australia) Michael Valkanis (Interim)	28 January 2013	4th, Round 18 (12–13)

=== Attendance at home games ===
Round	Date	Opponent	Score AUFC – Away	Attendance	Weekday
2	12 October 2012	Western Sydney Wanderers	1–0	8,950	Friday
4	27 October 2012	Wellington Phoenix	3–1	8,497	Saturday
6	11 November 2012	Perth Glory	1–1	9,212	Sunday
7	17 November 2012	Melbourne Heart	1–0	8,816	Saturday
10	7 December 2012	Melbourne Victory	4–2	14,115	Friday
11	16 December 2012	Wellington Phoenix	3–1	8,657	Saturday
13	26 December 2012	Brisbane Roar	0–1	11,035	Wednesday
14	31 December 2012	Sydney FC	3–0	10,934	Monday
16	11 January 2013	Perth Glory	3–2	10,129	Friday
19	3 February 2013	Western Sydney Wanderers	2–4	9,686	Sunday
20	8 February 2013	Melbourne Victory	1–0	12,029	Friday
23	2 March 2013	Brisbane Roar	0–1	6,878	Saturday
25	15 March 2013	Newcastle Jets	1–1	7,284	Friday
26	24 March 2013	Central Coast Mariners	0–2	8,069	Sunday
EF	7 April 2013	Brisbane Roar	1–2	10,234	Sunday

== Competitions ==
=== Overall ===
Competition	Started round	Current position / round	Final position / round	First match	Last match
A-League	—	—	4th	7 October 2012	30 March 2013
A-League; Finals	Elimination finals	—	Elimination finals	7 April 2013	7 April 2013

Updated to match played 8 April 2013
Source: Competitions

=== Pre-season ===
26 April 2012	White City	0–6	Adelaide United	Frank Mitchell Park, Woodville West
Thursday 19:00			Barbiero (pen.) van Dijk; Vidošić; Mullen

9 May 2012	Adelaide Raiders	0–5	Adelaide United	Croatian Sports Centre, Gepps Cross
Wednesday 19:00			van Dijk; Vidošić; Ramsay (o.g.)

23 May 2012	West Torrens Birkalla	0–2	Adelaide United	Camden Sports Complex, Novar Gardens
Wednesday 19:00			Vidošić

25 July 2012	Adelaide Hills Hawks	0–4	Adelaide United	The Hawks Nest, Woodside
Wednesday 18:30		Game abandoned after half-time due to bad weather. Report	Boogaard; Caravella; Barbiero (o.g.)

1 August 2012	Adelaide Comets	2–2	Adelaide United	Santos Stadium, Mile End
Wednesday 19:30	Bouraee 18'; Tesfagabr 81'		15' Ferreira; 36' (pen.) Vidošić

15 August 2012	South Australian State Select	1–3	Adelaide United	Burton Football Complex, Burton
Wednesday 19:30	Dittmar 57'	Report	49' Vidošić; 85' (o.g.); 90+' Golec

21 August 2012	Melbourne Heart	1–2	Adelaide United	Epping Stadium, Epping
Tuesday 19:00	Mebrahtu 28'	Report	10', 73' (pen.) Vidošić

24 August 2012	Melbourne Victory	4–2	Adelaide United	Aurora Stadium, Launceston
Friday 18:00	Allsopp 7'; Thompson 12', 35'; Finkler 77'	Report	45+1' Vidošić; 90+1' van Dijk	Attendance: 3,147

1 September 2012	Sydney FC	2–4	Adelaide United	Marconi Stadium, Bossley Park
Saturday 16:30	Yau 10'; Mallia 90'	Report	28' (o.g.) Ryall; 45' Cássio; 83' Jerónimo; 90+2' Kostopoulos

7 September 2012	Adelaide United	6–2	Brisbane Roar	Hindmarsh Stadium, Hindmarsh
Friday 19:30	Barbiero 22'; Fyfe 27', 33'; Jerónimo 59'; Ramsay 76' van Dijk 90+3'	Report	81', 85' Visconte

12 September 2012	Adelaide United	2–0	Central Coast Mariners	Hindmarsh Stadium, Hindmarsh
Wednesday 19:30	Cássio 62' van Dijk 90+3'	Report

=== A-League ===
==== League table ====
Pos	Team	Pld	W	D	L	GF	GA	GD	Pts	Qualification
1	Western Sydney Wanderers	27	18	3	6	41	21	+20	57	Qualification for 2014 AFC Champions League group stage and finals series
2	Central Coast Mariners (C)	27	16	6	5	48	22	+26	54	Qualification for 2014 AFC Champions League group stage and finals series
3	Melbourne Victory	27	13	5	9	48	45	+3	44	Qualification for 2014 AFC Champions League qualifying play-off and finals series (Note: Since the winner of 2013 A-League Grand Final (Central Coast Mariners) qualified for the 2014 AFC Champions League group stage, the 3rd placed team qualified for the qualifying play-off of 2014 AFC Champions League.)
4	Adelaide United	27	12	5	10	38	37	+1	41	Qualification for Finals series
5	Brisbane Roar	27	10	5	12	33	29	+4	35	Qualification for Finals series
6	Perth Glory	27	9	5	13	29	31	−2	32	Qualification for Finals series
7	Sydney FC	27	9	5	13	41	51	−10	32	
8	Newcastle Jets	27	8	7	12	30	45	−15	31	
9	Melbourne Heart	27	8	3	16	31	40	−9	27	
10	Wellington Phoenix (Note: Wellington Phoenix cannot qualify for the AFC Champions League as they are not recognised as an AFC club.)	27	7	6	14	31	49	−18	27	

Updated to match(es) played on 30 March 2013. Source: ultimatealeague.com
Rules for classification: 1) points; 2) goal difference; 3) number of goals scored.
(C) Champions

==== Results summary ====
Overall								Home						Away					
Pld	W	D	L	GF	GA	GD	Pts	W	D	L	GF	GA	GD	W	D	L	GF	GA	GD
27	12	5	10	38	37	+1	41	8	2	4	23	16	+7	4	3	6	15	21	−6

Last updated: 2 April 2013.
Source: Competitive Matches

==== Results by round ====
Round	1	2	3	4	5	6	7	8	9	10	11	12	13	14	15	16	17	18	19	20	21	22	23	24	25	26	27
Ground	A	H	A	H	A	H	H	A	A	H	H	A	H	H	A	H	A	A	H	H	A	A	H	A	H	H	A
Result	W	W	L	W	W	D	W	W	L	W	W	L	L	W	D	W	L	L	L	W	L	D	L	W	D	L	D
Position	1	1	1	1	1	2	1	1	2	2	2	2	2	2	2	2	2	4	4	4	4	3	4	4	4	4	4

Updated to match(es) played on 2 April 2013. Source: Competitive Matches
A = Away; H = Home; W = Win; D = Draw; L = Loss

==== Matches ====
7 October 2012 Round 1	Newcastle Jets	0–2	Adelaide United	Hunter Stadium, Newcastle
Sunday 14:30	Ritter (yellow card) 79'; Birighitti (red card) 57'	Report; Summary	2' Vidošić; (yellow card) 52' Boogaard; (yellow card) 68' Bowles; 74' Ramsay	Attendance: 14,868; Referee: Shaun Evans

12 October 2012 Round 2	Adelaide United	1–0	Western Sydney Wanderers	Hindmarsh Stadium, Adelaide
Friday 19:00	Malik (yellow card) 45'; Jerónimo (yellow card) 61' (goal) 69'; Barker-Daish (yellow card) 83'	Report; Summary	(yellow card) 40' Hersi; (yellow card) 41' Poljak; (yellow card) 56' Ono; (yellow card) 64' Beauchamp	Attendance: 8,950; Referee: Brenton Hayward

19 October 2012 Round 3	Melbourne Victory	2–1	Adelaide United	Etihad Stadium, Melbourne
Friday 19:00	Flores (yellow card) 8'; Milligan 52' (yellow card) 75'; Leijer (yellow card) 53'; Rojas 67'; Jeggo (yellow card) 88'	Report; Summary	(yellow card) 25' (goal) 49' (pen.) Vidošić; (yellow card) 90+1' Boogaard	Attendance: 19,174; Referee: Peter Green

27 October 2012 Round 4	Adelaide United	3–1	Wellington Phoenix	Hindmarsh Stadium, Adelaide
Saturday 17:00	Golec (yellow card) 11'; Jerónimo 55', 85' (yellow card) 60'; Cássio 68' (yellow card) 79'; Malik (yellow card) 87'	Report; Summary	(yellow card) 16' Fenton; 42' Huysegems; (red card) 77' Sigmund; (yellow card) 86' Durante; (yellow card) 90+3' Brockie	Attendance: 8,497; Referee: Jarred Gillett

4 November 2012 Round 5	Brisbane Roar	0–1	Adelaide United	Suncorp Stadium, Brisbane
Sunday 16:30	Stefanutto (yellow card) 31'	Report; Summary	3' (yellow card) 73' Vidošić; (yellow card) 32' van Dijk; (yellow card) 38' Carrusca; (yellow card) 77' Bowles; (yellow card) 90+2' Galeković	Attendance: 12,856; Referee: Chris Beath

11 November 2012 Round 6	Adelaide United	1–1	Perth Glory	Hindmarsh Stadium, Adelaide
Sunday 16:30	Vidošić 48'	Report; Summary	(yellow card) 24' Thwaite; 42' Mehmet; (yellow card) 73' van den Brink; (yellow card) 90' Jamieson	Attendance: 9,212; Referee: Peter O'Leary

17 November 2012 Round 7	Adelaide United	1–0	Melbourne Heart	Hindmarsh Stadium, Adelaide
Saturday 17:00	Jerónimo 58'	Report; Summary	(yellow card) 12' Hoffman; (yellow card) 55' Thompson	Attendance: 8,816; Referee: Ben Williams

23 November 2012 Round 8	Sydney FC	1–2	Adelaide United	Allianz Stadium, Sydney
Friday 19:00	Griffiths (yellow card) 7'; Antonis (yellow card) 19'; Yau (yellow card) 27' (goal) 57'; Ryall (yellow card) 63'; Chianese (yellow card) 77'	Report; Summary	21' Ferreira; (yellow card) 37' Cássio; (yellow card) 72' Boogaard; (yellow card) 83' Barbiero; 88' Vidošić	Attendance: 13,317; Referee: Peter Green

1 December 2012 Round 9	Central Coast Mariners	2–1	Adelaide United	Bluetongue Stadium, Gosford
Saturday 17:00	Rose 45'; Hutchinson (yellow card) 51'; Bojić (yellow card) 53'; Montgomery (yellow card) 60' (goal) 76'; McBreen (yellow card) 75'	Report; Summary	17' Djite	Attendance: 6,885; Referee: Alan Milliner

7 December 2012 Round 10	Adelaide United	4–2	Melbourne Victory	Hindmarsh Stadium, Adelaide
Friday 19:00	Vidošić (yellow card) 1'; Kostopoulos 3', 32'; F. Ferreira 22'; Carrusca 25'; Boogaard (yellow card) 40'; Cássio (yellow card) 55'; Djite (yellow card) 72'	Report; Summary	6' Nabbout; (yellow card) 12' Flores; (yellow card) 18' Finkler; (yellow card) 30' Leijer; (yellow card) 33' D. Ferreira; 47' Rojas; (yellow card) 79' Gallagher	Attendance: 14,115; Referee: Chris Beath

16 December 2012 Round 11	Adelaide United	3–1	Wellington Phoenix	Hindmarsh Stadium, Adelaide
Sunday 16:30	Carrusca 20', 25' (yellow card) 32'; Ferreira 45+2'	Report; Summary	(yellow card) 16' Muscat; (yellow card) 35' Ifill; (yellow card) 80' Sigmund; 81' Sánchez	Attendance: 8,657; Referee: Strebre Delovski

21 December 2012 Round 12	Western Sydney Wanderers	6–1	Adelaide United	Parramatta Stadium, Parramatta
Friday 18:30	D'Apuzzo (yellow card) 4'; Bridge 18', 45', 58'; Hersi (yellow card) 36'; Kresinger 45+2'; Ono 52'; La Rocca (yellow card) 72'; Gibbs 90'	Report; Summary	(yellow card) 28' Galeković; (yellow card) 61' Carrusca; 68' Vidošić; (yellow card) 78' Jerónimo; (yellow card) 90+2' Barbiero	Attendance: 9,056; Referee: Jarred Gillett

26 December 2012 Round 13	Adelaide United	0–1	Brisbane Roar	Hindmarsh Stadium, Adelaide
Wednesday 19:00	Jerónimo (yellow card) 18'; Fyfe (yellow card) 42'; Bowles (yellow card) 43'	Report; Summary	(yellow card) 25' Smith; (yellow card) 31' (goal) 66' Henrique; (yellow card) 46' Theo; (yellow card) 53' Paartalu; (yellow card) 90' Halloran	Attendance: 11,035; Referee: Adam Kersey

31 December 2012 Round 14	Adelaide United	3–0	Sydney FC	Hindmarsh Stadium, Adelaide
Monday 19:30	Vidošić 19', 29' (pen.); Kostopoulos (yellow card) 34'; Ramsay 62'; Cássio (yellow card) 90+3'	Report; Summary	(yellow card) 77' Calver	Attendance: 10,934; Referee: Jarred Gillett

5 January 2013 Round 15	Newcastle Jets	0–0	Adelaide United	Hunter Stadium, Newcastle
Saturday 17:00	Zadkovich (yellow card) 15'	Report; Summary	(yellow card) 70' Fyfe	Attendance: 10,721; Referee: Matthew Gillett

11 January 2013 Round 16	Adelaide United	3–2	Perth Glory	Hindmarsh Stadium, Adelaide
Friday 19:00	Galeković (yellow card) 17'; Jerónimo 29', 37'; Ramsay 46'	Report; Summary	(yellow card) 59' Pantelidis; 90' (pen.) Smeltz; 90+3' McGarry	Attendance: 10,129; Referee: Peter Green

18 January 2013 Round 17	Melbourne Heart	2–0	Adelaide United	AAMI Park, Melbourne
Friday 19:00	Tadić 5'; Garcia 50'; Behich (yellow card) 82'	Report; Summary	(yellow card) 21' Fyfe; (yellow card) 52' Golec	Attendance: 7,181; Referee: Lucien Laverdure

25 January 2013 Round 18	Central Coast Mariners	3–1	Adelaide United	Bluetongue Stadium, Gosford
Friday 19:00	Montgomery (yellow card) 46'; Duke 68', 72'; Zwaanswijk (yellow card) 83'; McGlinchey 88'	Report; Summary	39' Bowles; (yellow card) 45+1' Jerónimo	Attendance: 8,294; Referee: Peter O'Leary

3 February 2013 Round 19	Adelaide United	2–4	Western Sydney Wanderers	Hindmarsh Stadium, Adelaide
Sunday 16:30	McKain (yellow card) 25'; Boogaard (yellow card) 26'; Djite 61'; Ramsay 87'; Fyfe (yellow card) 90+1'	Report; Summary	43', 53' Hersi; 45' Bridge; (yellow card) 45' Mooy; (yellow card) 65' Kresinger; 68' Poljak	Attendance: 9,686; Referee: Chris Beath

8 February 2013 Round 20	Adelaide United	1–0	Melbourne Victory	Hindmarsh Stadium, Adelaide
Friday 19:00	McKain (yellow card) 13'; Malik (yellow card) 20'; Cássio (yellow card) 29'; Jerónimo (yellow card) 34' (goal) 43'; Ramsay (yellow card) 41'; Bowles (yellow card) 90+2'	Report; Summary	(yellow card) 61' Flores; (red card) 75' Traoré	Attendance: 12,029; Referee: Jarred Gillett

16 February 2013 Round 21	Sydney FC	2–1	Adelaide United	Allianz Stadium, Sydney
Saturday 17:00	Antonis 49'; Powell 66'; McFlynn (yellow card) 68'	Report; Summary	(yellow card) 60' Golec; 78' Juric; (yellow card) 83' Fyfe; (yellow card) 84' Carrusca	Attendance: 15,602; Referee: Strebre Delovski

24 February 2013 Round 22	Wellington Phoenix	2–2	Adelaide United	Westpac Stadium, Wellington
Sunday 14:00	Brockie 31'; Muscat (yellow card) 58'; Gameiro 80'	Report; Summary	(yellow card) 5' (yellow-red card) 69' McKain; (yellow card) 8' Malik; 20' Juric; 34' Carrusca; (yellow card) 79' Boogaard; (yellow card) 90+1' Kostopoulos	Attendance: 4,832; Referee: Tim McGilchrist

2 March 2013 Round 23	Adelaide United	0–1	Brisbane Roar	Hindmarsh Stadium, Adelaide
Saturday 17:00	Malik (yellow card) 51' (red card) 90+3'	Report; Summary	(yellow card) 21' Hingert; (yellow card) 43' Brattan; (yellow card) 49' Franjic; 83' Halloran	Attendance: 6,878; Referee: Shaun Evans

11 March 2013 Round 24	Melbourne Heart	0–2	Adelaide United	AAMI Park, Melbourne
Monday 19:00	Colosimo (yellow card) 68'; Garcia (yellow card) 80'	Report; Summary	(yellow card) 33' (goal) 53' Ramsay; 40' (pen.) Vidošić; (yellow card) 41' McKain; (yellow card) 64' Juric; (yellow card) 77' Galeković; (yellow card) 81' Boogaard	Attendance: 5,393; Referee: Chris Beath

15 March 2013 Round 25	Adelaide United	1–1	Newcastle Jets	Hindmarsh Stadium, Adelaide
Friday 19:00	Carrusca 49'; Vidošić (yellow card) 52'	Report; Summary	(yellow card) 15' Brown; (yellow card) 45+1' Goodwin; 44' Bridges; (yellow card) 66' Jesic	Attendance: 7,284; Referee: Lucien Laverdure

24 March 2013 Round 26	Adelaide United	0–2	Central Coast Mariners	Hindmarsh Stadium, Adelaide
Sunday 16:30	McKain (yellow card) 45'; Boogaard (yellow card) 77'	Report; Summary	4' McBreen; 90+2' Sterjovski	Attendance: 8,069; Referee: Shaun Evans

30 March 2013 Round 27	Perth Glory	1–1	Adelaide United	nib Stadium, Perth
Saturday 21:15	Heffernan (yellow card) 56'; Zahra 58'; Burns (yellow card) 70'	Report; Summary	(yellow card) 59' Djite; (yellow card) 84' Jerónimo; 90+1' Barker-Daish	Attendance: 16,707; Referee: Kris Griffiths-Jones

==== Finals ====
7 April 2013 Elimination Finals	Adelaide United	1–2	Brisbane Roar	Hindmarsh Stadium, Adelaide
Sunday 16:30	Jerónimo (yellow card) 33'; Fyfe (yellow card) 57'; Ferreira (yellow card) 73'; Carrusca (yellow card) 78'; Juric (yellow card) 86'; Vidošić 89'; Cássio (yellow card) 88'	Report; Summary	28' (yellow card) 38' Brattan; 45+2' Franjic; (yellow card) 61' Lustica; (yellow card) 76' Nijland	Attendance: 10,234; Referee: Chris Beath
