= Daniel Bowles =

Australian football player

Personal information
- Full name: Daniel James Bowles
- Date of birth: 19 October 1991 (age 35)
- Place of birth: Toowoomba, Australia
- Height: 1.89 m (6 ft 2 1/2 in)
- Positions: Centre-back; right-back

Youth career
- St Albans
- 2007–2008: QAS
- 2008–2009: AIS
- 2008–2011: Brisbane Roar
- 2011–2012: Gold Coast United

Senior career*
Years	Team	Apps	(Gls)
2007	Toowoomba Raiders		
2008	AIS	8	(1)
2011	Brisbane Roar	0	(0)
2011–2012	Gold Coast United	12	(2)
2012–2014	Adelaide United	21	(1)
2014–2020	Brisbane Roar	81	(1)
2021–	Brisbane City	39	(3)

International career
2007–2009	Australia U17	0	(0)
2009–2011	Australia U20	14	(2)
Medal record
Representing Australia
Men's Association football
AFC U-20 Asian Cup
Runner-up	2010 China
- * Club domestic league appearances and goals as of 23 September 2022

Daniel Bowles (born 19 October 1991) is a retired A-League Australian professional soccer player.

== Club career ==
=== Early career ===
Bowles played all of his junior football in Toowoomba, initially with St Albans Football Club followed by the South Toowoomba Hawks and made his senior debut at 15 with the Toowoomba Raiders who play in the Brisbane Premier League (BPL).

=== Brisbane Roar ===
In 2008, Daniel Bowles signed with Brisbane Roar, participating in the club's inaugural National Youth League season, where the Roar would finish third, just missing out on a spot in the final. The following season, Bowles would feature heavily, being a sturdy defender in what was a dismal season for the team. On 7 February 2011, Bowles was called up to the senior team following the departure of former player of the season, Luke DeVere. He signed a one-year contract that took him through to the end of that season.

=== Gold Coast United ===
In 9 September's edition of the Courier Mail, it was reported that Bowles would trial at right back for Gold Coast United in a pre-season match later in the month.

On 16 December 2011 he made his debut for A-League club Gold Coast United. On 9 March 2012 Bowles scored his first senior career goal against Newcastle Jets.

=== Adelaide United ===
On 22 March 2012 it was announced Bowles had signed a two-year undisclosed contract with Adelaide United in the A-League. On 2 May 2014, it was announced that Bowles, as well as colleague Jake Barker-Daish were released from the club.

=== Return to Brisbane Roar ===
On 8 July 2014, 3.5 months after being released by Adelaide United, Bowles signed with Brisbane Roar. Bowles made his debut for the Roar in the 4–0 plundering of the Newcastle Jets at Hunter Stadium. Bowles was awarded his first red card of the season in the Roar's 3–2 away win against Adelaide United. He received the red card after holding back defender Nigel Boogaard, who was later found out to be offside, and Adelaide were apportioned a penalty. Despite this, Bowles featured in the Round 25 Team of the Week. He featured in three of the Roar's ACL fixtures, being part of the defensive team that kept a clean sheet against Beijing Guoan.

Bowles obtained a serious knee injury in January 2017, ruling him out for the remainder of the season. He returned to play the beginning of the next season.

Bowles retired from professional football in August 2020 to focus on a cafe business.

== Honours ==
Australia U-20

- AFC U-20 Asian Cup: runner-up 2010
