= Antony Golec =

Australian footballer (born 1990)

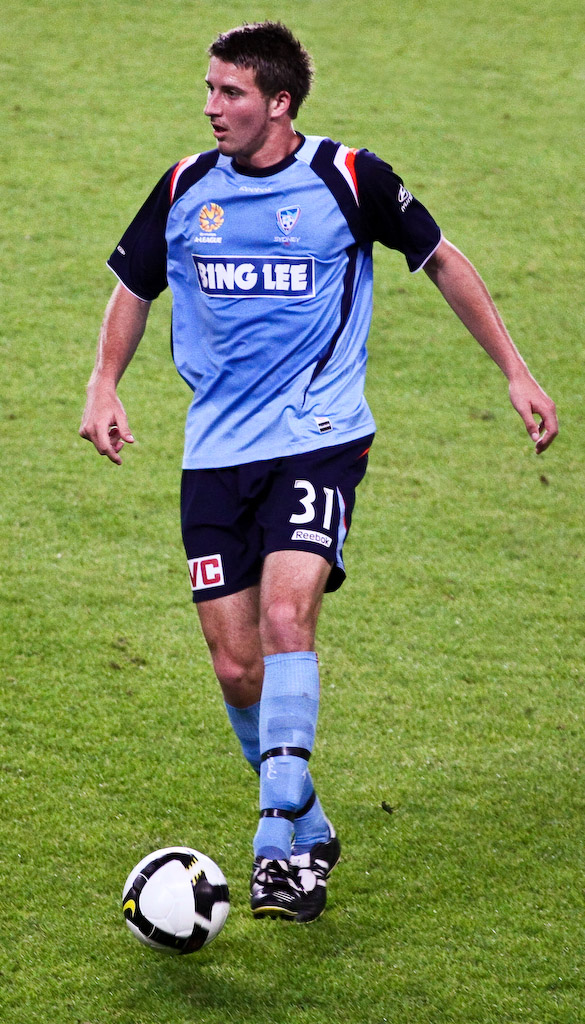
- Golec with Sydney FC in 2008

Personal information
- Full name: Antony Paul Golec
- Date of birth: 29 May 1990 (age 36)
- Place of birth: Sydney, Australia
- Height: 1.91 m (6 ft 3 in)
- Position: Centre-back

Youth career
- –2008: Sydney United
- 2008–2011: Sydney FC

Senior career*
Years	Team	Apps	(Gls)
2008	Sydney United	15	(3)
2008–2011	Sydney FC	10	(0)
2011	Sydney United	15	(0)
2011–2014	Adelaide United	26	(1)
2014–2015	Western Sydney Wanderers	17	(0)
2015–2016	Perth Glory	6	(0)
2016	Sheriff Tiraspol	11	(0)
2016	Persepolis	0	(0)
2017	Bucheon FC	0	(0)
2017–2019	Central Coast Mariners	31	(0)
2019	Wellington Phoenix	6	(0)
2019	Badak Lampung	18	(1)
2020	Perak FA	10	(0)
2020–2022	Macarthur FC	18	(0)
Total		183	(5)

International career
2009	Australia U20	4	(0)
2010	Australia U23	2	(0)
- * Club domestic league appearances and goals

Antony Paul Golec (Croatian pronunciation: [antonêː ɡoːlěːts]; born 29 May 1990) is an Australian former professional footballer who played as a centre back. Golec is now a real estate agent after his retirement from professional football.

== Club career ==
=== Sydney FC ===
Golec was a member of the inaugural Sydney FC National Youth League squad in 2008/2009. On 25 October 2008, Golec made his debut for Sydney FC against Melbourne Victory. He also got his chance against Perth Glory and was praised by his coaches after the game of his great performance. He went on to make a total of 10 appearances for Sydney FC.

=== Adelaide United ===
On 26 September 2011, it was announced that Golec had signed a one-year contract with Adelaide United. On 22 December 2011, Golec made his debut for Adelaide United coming on the 82nd minute for Fabian Barbiero. Golec made his home debut as left back on 30 December 2011 against Wellington Phoenix, scoring his first A-League goal in the 61st minute, Adelaide went on to win 2–0. On 19 March 2012, it was announced Golec had signed an undisclosed contract with Adelaide United for a further two years, which will keep him in Australia until 2014.

On 8 January 2014, after three years at the club, it was announced that Golec would be going to China to explore an opportunity to play for Chinese Super League side Liaoning Whowin.

=== Western Sydney Wanderers ===
On 4 February 2014, it was announced that Adelaide United released Golec. On the same day he signed with Western Sydney Wanderers. However, since there are no spaces remaining in the club's A-League squad, Golec will only be eligible to participate in Western Sydney Wanderers's 2014 AFC Champions League campaign during the 2013–14 season.

On 12 March, Golec made his debut in the starting 11 for the club against Chinese Super League side Guizhou Renhe in the 2014 AFC Champions League. Wanderers went on to win the game 1–0 away from home. It was announced in May that Golec re-signed with the Wanderers for a further season keeping him at the club for the 2014/2015 Hyundai A-League season.

Golec was part of the squad which won the 2014 AFC Champions League, playing an important role throughout the campaign. He was also part of the squad which participated in the 2014 FIFA Club World Cup, playing against Cruz Azul and ES Sétif. The Wanderers went on to finish 5th at the tournament.

On 15 May 2015, Golec was released by Wanderers.

=== Perth Glory ===
On 23 May Golec joined Perth Glory on a 2-year deal keeping him at the club until the end of the 2016–2017 season. Golec made his debut for the club on 11 August against Newcastle Jets in the FFA Cup. Perth Glory won 4–3 on penalties with Golec scoring one.

=== Sheriff Tiraspol ===
On 15 January 2016 it was announced that Antony Golec would be leaving Perth Glory to take up an 18-month deal with Moldovan National Division team Sheriff Tiraspol. On 29 May FC Sheriff won the championship and qualification to UEFA Champions league with a 1–0 win against Dacia Chisinau. Golec played a major role for the club since arriving in January playing 13 games for FC Sheriff Tiraspol.

=== Persepolis ===
On 22 June 2016 Golec signed a two-year contract with Persian Gulf Pro League club Persepolis. On 22 September Golec terminated his contract through FIFA due to unpaid wages.

=== Bucheon FC 1995 ===
On 8 December 2016 Golec signed with K League Challenge club Bucheon FC 1995 for 2 seasons, Keeping him at the club until December 2018.

On 22 February 2017, Golec's contract was officially terminated by mutual consent before the season opening.

=== Central Coast Mariners ===
On 30 May 2017, Golec returned to the A-League, signing a one-year contract with Central Coast Mariners. On 25 April 2018, Golec resigned with the club on a 1-year extension, keeping him at the mariners for the 18/19 Hyundai A-League season.

=== Wellington Phoenix ===
In January 2019, Golec signed a contract with A-League club Wellington Phoenix. He arrives at the club via the Central Coast Mariners, where he played 31 games across one and a half seasons. Struggling for game time, he was released by the Mariners on Tuesday, paving way for Golec to join the Phoenix for the remainder of the season. Golec is the third player to join the Phoenix in the January transfer window, following the arrivals of former Republic of Ireland striker Cillian Sheridan and All Whites right-back Justin Gulley.

=== Badak Lampung ===
On 26 August 2019, Golec signed one-year contract with Liga 1 Indonesia club Badak Lampung. it was confirmed that he was registered as an Australian citizen, due to Badak Lampung need to fill a quota of foreign players from Asia, replacing Kunihiro Yamashita. He made his debut in a 0–1 away win against Persija Jakarta on 1 September.

== International career ==
In 2009 Golec made his international debut for the Australian national Under 20 team's in Argentina, Playing full games against Uruguay and USA and making 2 more appearances. Golec was also part of the 30-man squad in the lead up to the 2009 FIFA Under 20's World Cup in Egypt.

In 2010 Golec made his Australia Olympic football team debut under Aurelio Vidmar and Paul Okon. Playing full games against DPR Korea, (who competed in the 2010 World Cup in Africa) and the Kuwait under 23 National team.

On 19 October 2011, Golec was named in Holger Osieck and Aurelio Vidmar's joint Australia national team/Australia Olympic team Camp.

On 24 February 2012, Golec was selected to be part of the Australian U23's (Olyroos) squad for the 2012 London Olympic Qualifier matches against Uzbekistan and UAE.

On 17 September 2017, he declared that he would represent Croatia if chosen.

== Career statistics ==
=== Club ===
Appearances and goals by club, season and competition
Club	Season	League			National Cup		Continental^{1}		Other		Total	
Club	Season	Division	Apps	Goals	Apps	Goals	Apps	Goals	Apps	Goals	Apps	Goals
Sydney	2008–09	A-League	6	0	0	0	–		–		6	0
Sydney	2009–10	A-League	3	0	–		–		–		3	0
Sydney	2010–11	A-League	1	0	–		0	0	–		1	0
Sydney	Total		10	0	0	0	0	0	-	-	10	0
Adelaide United	2011–12	A-League	11	1	–		2	1	–		13	2
Adelaide United	2012–13	A-League	15	0	–		–		–		15	0
Adelaide United	2013–14	A-League	0	0	–		–		–		0	0
Adelaide United	Total		26	1	-	-	2	1	-	-	28	2
Western Sydney Wanderers	2013–14	A-League	0	0	0	0	13	1	–		13	1
Western Sydney Wanderers	2014–15	A-League	17	0	1	0	6	0	–		24	0
Western Sydney Wanderers	Total		17	0	1	0	19	1	-	-	37	1
Perth Glory	2015–16	A-League	6	0	4	0	–		–		10	0
Sheriff Tiraspol	2015–16	Divizia Națională	11	0	2	0	0	0	0	0	13	0
Career total			70	1	7	0	21	2	0	0	98	3

^{1} – includes FIFA Club World Cup statistics; AFC Champions League statistics are included in season commencing after group stages (i.e. 2011 ACL in 2011–12 A-League season etc.)

== Honours ==
=== Club ===
Sydney FC:

- A-League Premiership: 2009–10
- A-League Championship: 2009–10
- National Youth League: 2008–09

Western Sydney Wanderers:

- AFC Champions League: 2014

Sheriff Tiraspol:

- Moldovan National Division: 2015–16
