= Paul Izzo =

Australian soccer player (born 1995)

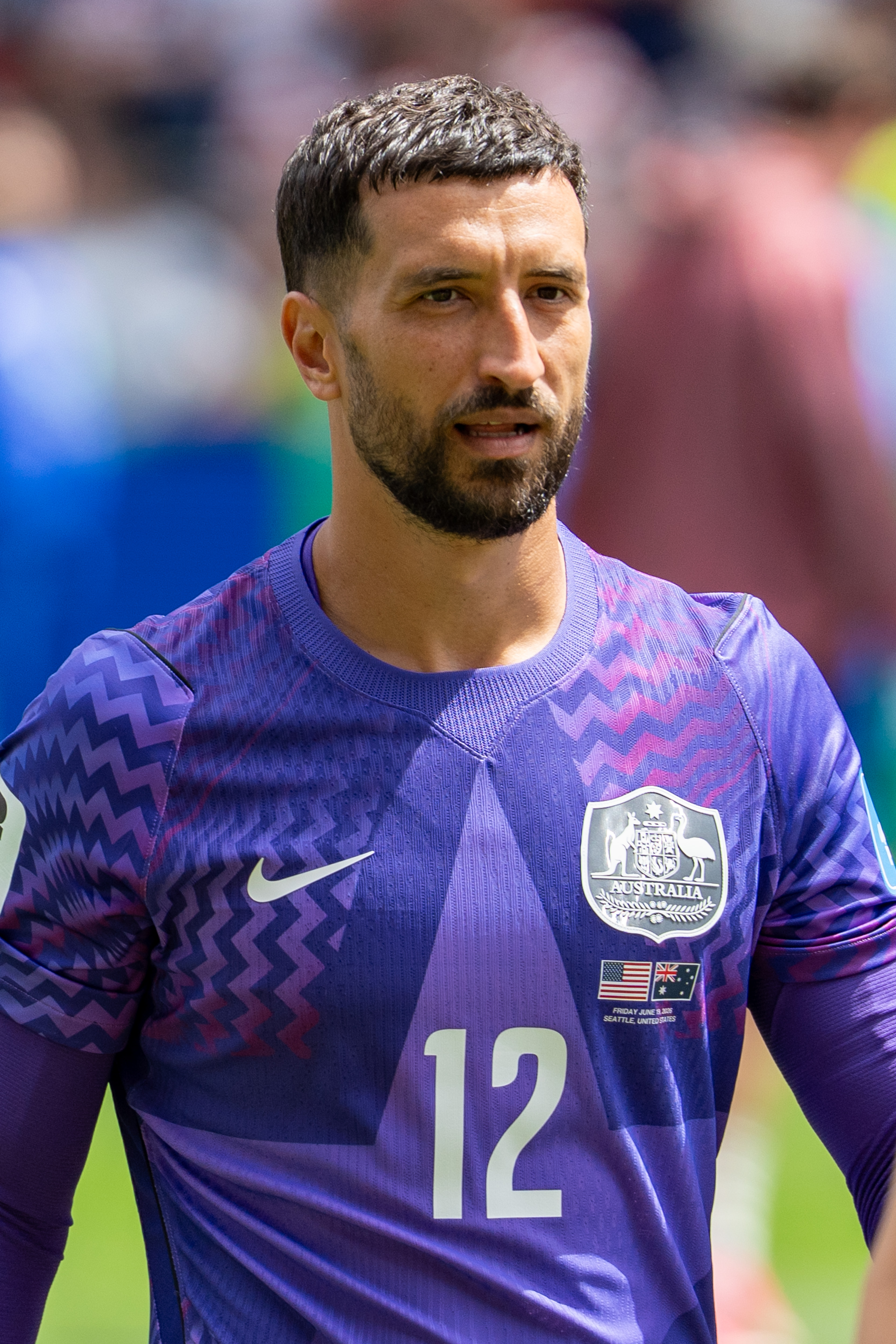
- Izzo with Australia in 2026

Personal information
- Full name: Paul David Izzo
- Date of birth: 6 January 1995 (age 31)
- Place of birth: Adelaide, Australia
- Height: 1.85 m (6 ft 1 in)
- Position: Goalkeeper

Team information
- Current team: Randers
- Number: 1

Youth career
- –2010: Campbelltown City
- 2010–2011: A.I.S.
- 2011–2012: Adelaide United

Senior career*
Years	Team	Apps	(Gls)
2011–2015	Adelaide United	6	(0)
2015–2017	Central Coast Mariners	42	(0)
2017–2020	Adelaide United	78	(0)
2020–2022	Xanthi	45	(0)
2022–2024	Melbourne Victory	50	(0)
2024–	Randers	64	(0)

International career^{‡}
2010–2011	Australia U17	13	(0)
2011–2014	Australia U20	15	(0)
2015–2018	Australia U23	6	(0)
2025–	Australia	4	(0)
- * Club domestic league appearances and goals as of 19 May 2026 ‡ National team caps and goals as of 7 June 2026

Paul David Izzo (Italian: [ˈittso]; born 6 January 1995) is an Australian professional soccer player who plays as a goalkeeper for Danish Superliga side Randers and the Australia national team. He was selected to play in the 2026 FIFA World Cup. He made his professional debut for Adelaide United in 2012. In 2015, he joined Central Coast Mariners before returning to Adelaide United in 2017.

== Early life and education ==
Paul David Izzo was born on 6 January 1995 in Adelaide, South Australia.

Izzo graduated from Rostrevor College in 2012. He played for Campbelltown City as a junior, where his talent was recognised spotted and joined the Australian Institute of Sport in 2010.

== Club career ==
=== Adelaide United ===
Izzo made his professional debut against the Central Coast Mariners away at Bluetongue Stadium on 1 December 2012, replacing Eugene Galeković, who was unavailable as a result of international duties. His first home game appearance for Adelaide United was against Melbourne Victory on 7 December 2012, in a 4-2 win.

=== Central Coast Mariners ===
Izzo was released by Adelaide United on 8 July 2015, and subsequently signed with the Mariners for two years.

=== Return to Adelaide United ===
In April 2017, Izzo returned to his hometown club, Adelaide United, on a three-year contract.

=== Xanthi ===
In October 2020, Izzo was transferred to Greek club Xanthi for an undisclosed fee, following a few Australian players and coach Tony Popovic.

=== Melbourne Victory ===
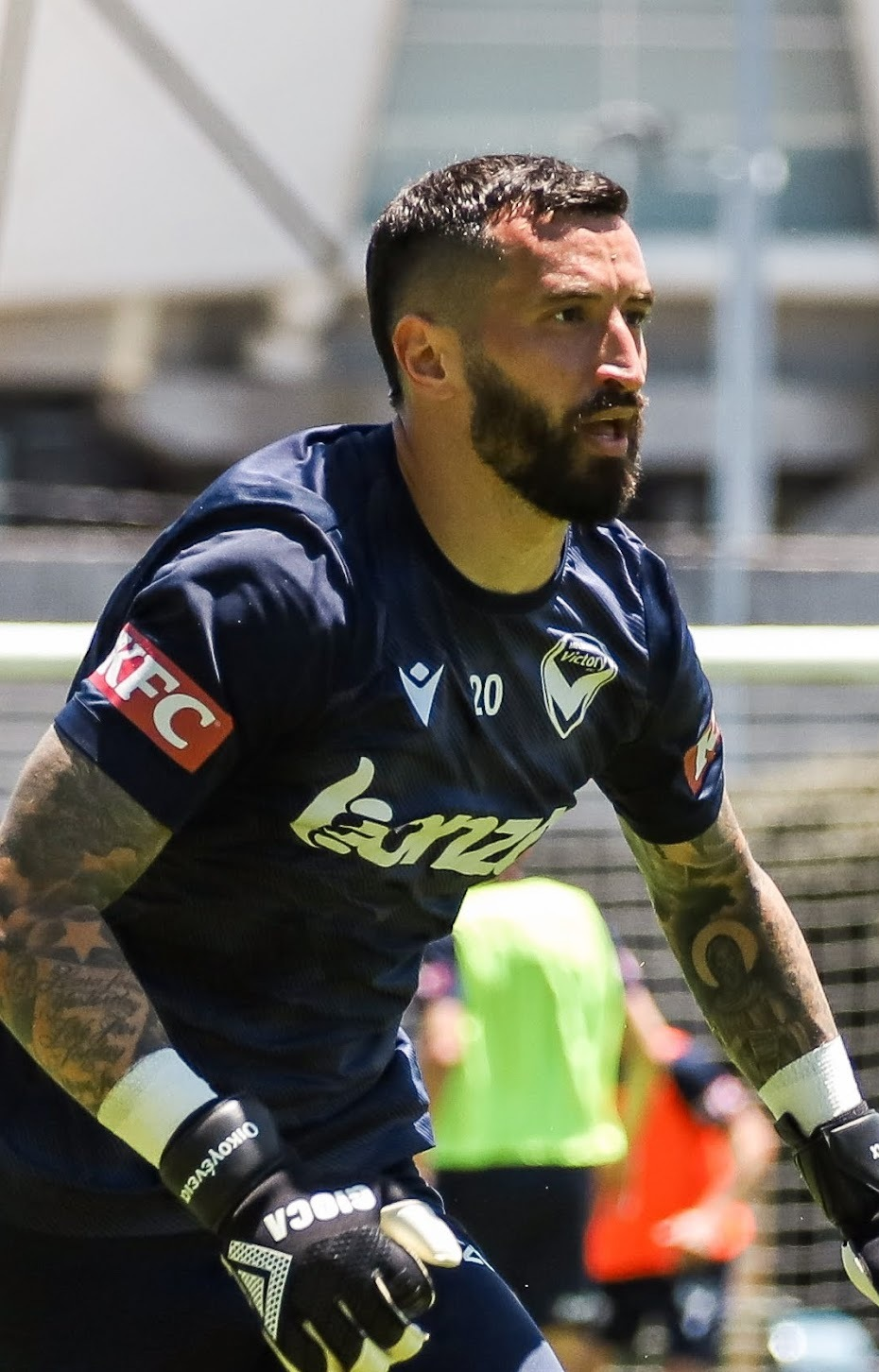
Izzo playing for Melbourne Victory in 2022

On 8 July 2022, Izzo returned to Australia, joining Melbourne Victory as a free agent, and signing a three-year contract. In the 2023–24 A-League Men play-offs against cross-town rivals Melbourne City, Izzo made nine saves, including one on a penalty kick, in regular time, before saving three penalties and scoring one himself in the penalty shootout, thus helping Victory reach the semi-finals.

=== Randers ===
On 9 July 2024, Izzo joined Danish Superliga club Randers for an undisclosed fee, signing a three-year contract.

== International career ==
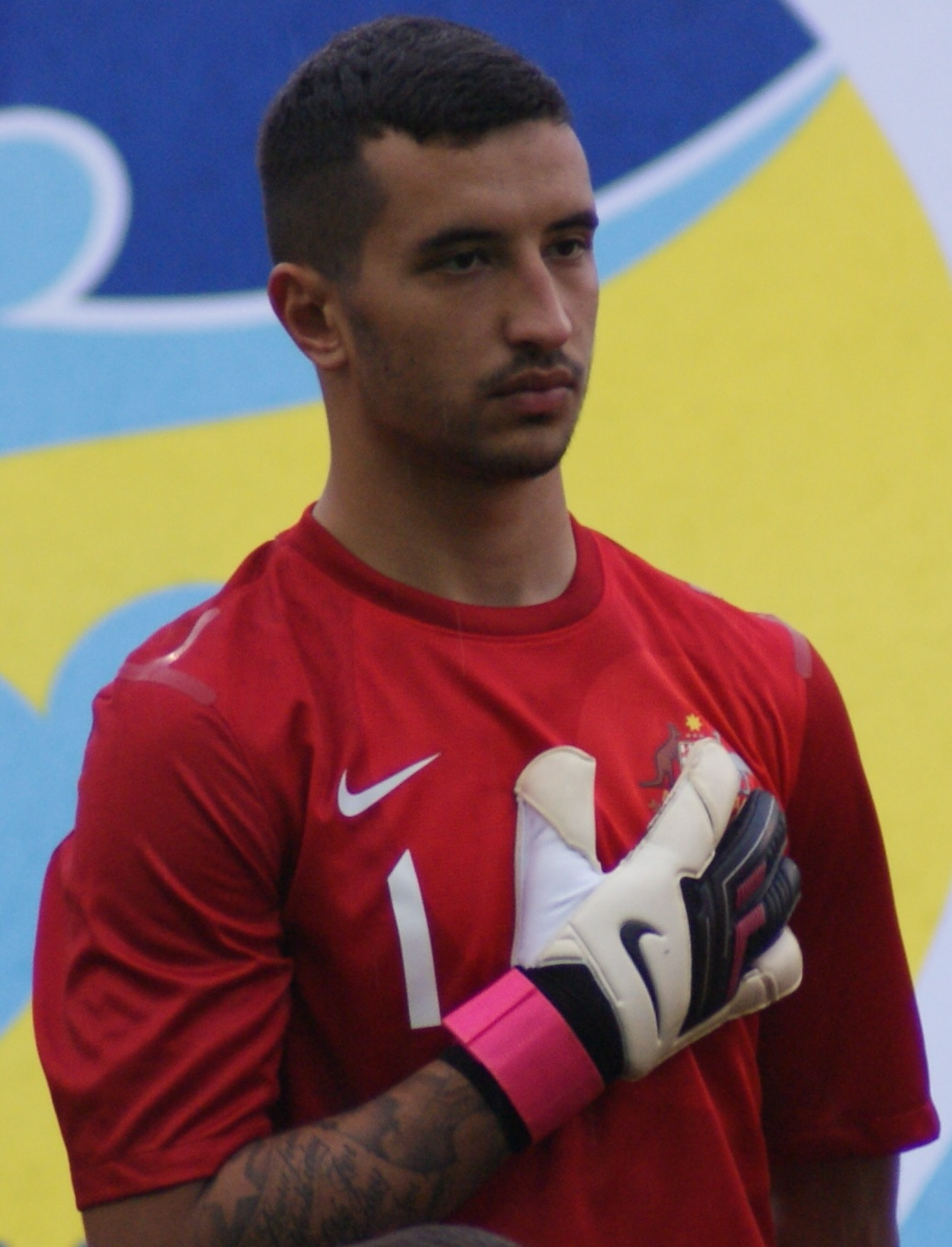
Izzo with Australia U20 in 2013

Izzo represented Australia at U20 level at the 2012 AFC U-19 Championship in United Arab Emirates and at the 2013 FIFA U-20 World Cup in Turkey.

He was first called up for the senior Socceroos squad on 28 August 2021, for 2022 FIFA World Cup qualifiers against China and Vietnam.

On 5 September 2025, Izzo made his debut for the Australian senior team, starting against New Zealand in the first of the 2025 Soccer Ashes games and keeping a clean sheet in a 1–0 win.

On 31 May 2026, Izzo was selected in the 26-man squad for the 2026 FIFA World Cup, one of five players from Adelaide.

== Career statistics ==
=== Club ===
As of 31 August 2025

Club	Season	Division	League^{(Note: includes A-League final series statistics)}		Cup		Other^{(Note: includes Super League Greece relegation play-offs)}		Total	
Club	Season	Division	Apps	Goals	Apps	Goals	Apps	Goals	Apps	Goals
Adelaide United	2011–12	A-League	0	0	0	0	0	0	0	0
Adelaide United	2012–13	A-League	3	0	0	0	0	0	3	0
Adelaide United	2013–14	A-League	0	0	0	0	0	0	0	0
Adelaide United	2014–15	A-League	3	0	1	0	0	0	4	0
Adelaide United	Total		6	0	1	0	0	0	7	0
Central Coast Mariners	2015–16	A-League	21	0	1	0	0	0	22	0
Central Coast Mariners	2016–17	A-League	21	0	0	0	0	0	21	0
Central Coast Mariners	Total		42	0	1	0	0	0	43	0
Adelaide United	2017–18	A-League	24	0	5	0	0	0	29	0
Adelaide United	2018–19	A-League	29	0	5	0	0	0	30	0
Adelaide United	2019–20	A-League	25	0	4	0	0	0	29	0
Adelaide United	Total		78	0	14	0	0	0	92	0
Xanthi	2020–21	Super League Greece 2	20	0	0	0	2	0	22	0
Xanthi	2021–22	Super League Greece 2	25	0	2	0	0	0	27	0
Xanthi	Total		45	0	2	0	2	0	49	0
Melbourne Victory	2022–23	A-League	19	0	1	0	0	0	20	0
Melbourne Victory	2023–24	A-League	31	0	0	0	0	0	31	0
Melbourne Victory	Total		50	0	1	0	0	0	51	0
Randers	2024–25	Danish Superliga	32	0	0	0	1 (Note: Appearance in Europa League play-offs)	0	33	0
Randers	2025–26	Danish Superliga	19	0	0	0	—		3	0
Randers	Total		51	0	0	0	1	0	36	0
Career Total			275	0	20	0	2	0	278	0

=== International ===
As of match played 7 June 2026

Appearances and goals by national team and year
National team	Year	Apps	Goals
Australia	2025	3	0
Australia	2026	1	0
Total		4	0

== Honours ==
=== Club ===
Adelaide United

- FFA Cup: 2014, 2018, 2019

=== Individual ===
- Central Coast Mariners Player of the Year: 2016–17

== See also ==
- List of Central Coast Mariners FC players
