= 2013 A-League All Stars Game =

- Event: A-League All Stars Game
A-League All Stars	Manchester United
(Australia)	(England)
1	5
- Date: 20 July 2013
- Venue: ANZ Stadium, Sydney
- Man of the Match: Robin van Persie (Manchester United)
- Referee: Masaaki Toma (Japan)
- Attendance: 83,127

The 2013 A-League All Stars Game was a soccer match that took place on 20 July 2013 at ANZ Stadium in Sydney, contested between the A-League All Stars and English Premier League champions Manchester United.

== Background ==
Tickets which went on sale earlier in the year sold out in minutes. A Manchester United training session which was open to the public attracted 22,000 people at Allianz Stadium. It is the first time since 1999 that Manchester United have visited Australia. On 18 March 2013, it was announced Melbourne Victory coach Ange Postecoglou will coach the all-stars squad, chosen by fans who voted.

Some A-League players, including Alessandro Del Piero and Emile Heskey, were not able to play due to other commitments.

== A-League All Stars players ==
Pos.	Player	Club
GK	(Australia) Ante Covic	Western Sydney Wanderers
GK	(Australia) Michael Theo	Brisbane Roar
DF	(Australia) Michael Beauchamp	Western Sydney Wanderers
DF	(Australia) Pedj Bojić	Central Coast Mariners
DF	(Australia) Nigel Boogaard	Adelaide United
DF	(Australia) Connor Chapman	Newcastle Jets
DF	(Australia) Joshua Risdon	Perth Glory
DF	(Australia) Joshua Rose	Central Coast Mariners
DF	(Australia) Nikolai Topor-Stanley	Western Sydney Wanderers
MF	(Germany) Thomas Broich	Brisbane Roar
MF	(Argentina) Marcelo Carrusca	Adelaide United
MF	(Australia) Billy Celeski	Melbourne Victory
MF	(Australia) Brett Emerton	Sydney FC
MF	(Australia) Rhyan Grant	Sydney FC
MF	(New Zealand) Michael McGlinchey	Central Coast Mariners
MF	(Republic of Ireland) Liam Miller	Brisbane Roar
FW	(Albania) Besart Berisha	Brisbane Roar
FW	(Australia) Mark Bridge	Western Sydney Wanderers
FW	(Barbados) Paul Ifill	Wellington Phoenix
FW	(Australia) David Williams	Melbourne Heart

== Match ==
=== Details ===
20 July 2013
19:30 AEST

A-League All Stars	1–5	(England) Manchester United
Berisha 51'	Report	Lingard 10', 54'; Welbeck 33', 70'; Van Persie 86'

ANZ Stadium, Sydney
Attendance: 83,127
Referee: Masaaki Toma (Japan)

A-League All Stars	Manchester United

GK	1	(Australia) Ante Covic	(substituted off) 45'
RB	6	(Australia) Pedj Bojić	(substituted off) 45'
CB	2	(Australia) Nigel Boogaard
CB	5	(Australia) Michael Beauchamp	(substituted off) 83'
LB	4	(Australia) Nikolai Topor-Stanley	(substituted off) 73'
RM	7	(Australia) Brett Emerton (c)	(substituted off) 83'
CM	10	(Republic of Ireland) Liam Miller	(substituted off) 45'
LM	3	(Australia) Joshua Rose	(substituted off) 64'
RF	14	(New Zealand) Michael McGlinchey	(substituted off) 61'
CF	11	(Albania) Besart Berisha
LF	22	(Germany) Thomas Broich	(substituted off) 72'
Substitutes:
GK	18	(Australia) Michael Theo	(substituted on) 45'
DF	12	(Australia) Joshua Risdon	(substituted on) 45'
DF	16	(Australia) Connor Chapman	(substituted on) 83'
MF	15	(Australia) Rhyan Grant	(substituted on) 61'
MF	17	(Argentina) Marcelo Carrusca	(substituted on) 83'
MF	21	(Australia) Billy Celeski	(substituted on) 45'
FW	8	(Barbados) Paul Ifill	(substituted on) 72'
FW	13	(Australia) David Williams	(substituted on) 73'
FW	19	(Australia) Mark Bridge	(substituted on) 64'
Manager:
(Australia) Ange Postecoglou

GK	13	(Denmark) Anders Lindegaard
RB	2	(Brazil) Rafael
CB	4	(England) Phil Jones
CB	5	(England) Rio Ferdinand	(substituted off) 45'
LB	3	(France) Patrice Evra (c)	(substituted off) 75'
RM	35	(England) Jesse Lingard
CM	16	(England) Michael Carrick	(substituted off) 70'
CM	23	(England) Tom Cleverley
LM	29	(England) Wilfried Zaha
CF	19	(England) Danny Welbeck	(substituted off) 70'
CF	11	(Wales) Ryan Giggs	(substituted off) 62'
Substitutes:
GK	1	(Spain) David de Gea
DF	22	(Brazil) Fábio	(substituted on) 75'
DF	38	(England) Michael Keane	(substituted on) 45'
MF	8	(Brazil) Anderson	(substituted on) 70'
MF	44	(Belgium) Adnan Januzaj	(substituted on) 70'
FW	20	(Netherlands) Robin van Persie	(substituted on) 62'
Manager:
(Scotland) David Moyes

Man of the Match:
Robin van Persie (Manchester United)

Match rules

- 90 minutes
- 30 minutes of extra-time if necessary
- Penalty shoot-out if scores still level

=== Statistics ===
	A-League All Stars	Manchester United
Goals scored	1	5
Total shots	6	17
Shots on target	3	13
Ball possession	33%	67%
Corner kicks	2	15
Fouls committed	4	4
Offsides	0	2
Yellow cards	0	0
Second caution red cards	0	0
Direct red cards	0	0

== Broadcasting ==
In Australia, the match was broadcast live by the Seven Network. In the UK, the match was broadcast live on Manchester United's subscription television channel MUTV.

== Sponsorship ==
A-League All Stars partners:

- Foxtel
- Hyundai
- NSW Government
- Nike
