= Osama Malik =

Australian soccer player

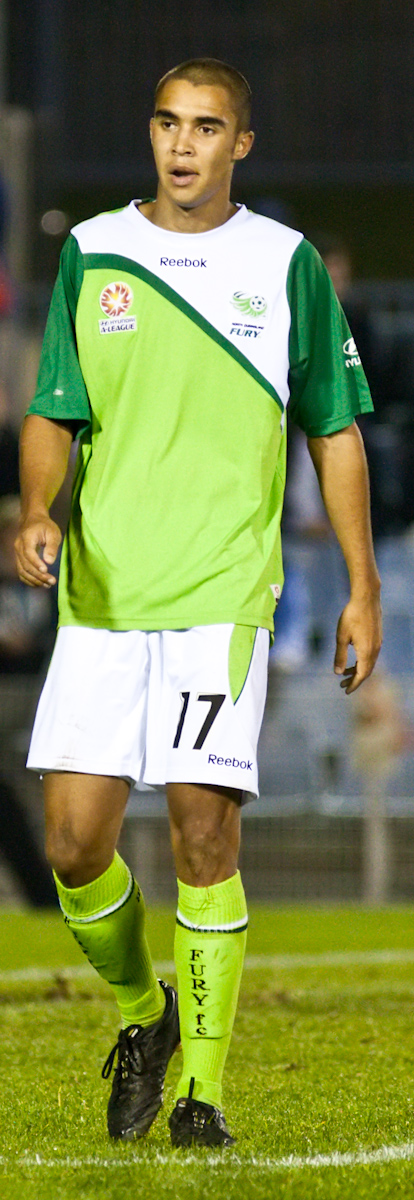
- Malik with North Queensland Fury in 2009

Personal information
- Full name: Osama Malik
- Date of birth: 30 September 1990 (age 36)
- Place of birth: Adelaide, Australia
- Height: 1.85 m (6 ft 1 in)
- Positions: Defensive midfielder; centre-back

Youth career
- –2003: Croydon Kings
- 2003–2005: West Adelaide
- 2006–2008: Adelaide Raiders
- 2008–2009: Adelaide United

Senior career*
Years	Team	Apps	(Gls)
2006	Croydon Kings	6	(0)
2007–2008	Adelaide Raiders	37	(12)
2008–2009	Adelaide United	0	(0)
2009	Adelaide Galaxy	4	(1)
2009–2011	North Queensland Fury	23	(0)
2011–2016	Adelaide United	95	(2)
2016–2019	Melbourne City	57	(0)
2019	Al-Batin	8	(0)
2019–2022	Perth Glory	34	(0)
2022–2023	Odisha	15	(0)
Total		279	(15)

International career^{‡}
2009	Australia U20	5	(0)
- * Club domestic league appearances and goals as of 2 February 2023 ‡ National team caps and goals as of 16 November 2010

Osama "Ozzie" Malik (Arabic: أسامة ملك; born 30 September 1990) is an Australian professional footballer who plays as a defensive midfielder or centre-back.

== Club career ==
Malik signed for Adelaide United's youth squad at the commencement of the A-League 2008–09 season. Prior to this he had been plying his trade for local clubs Croydon Kings and Adelaide Raiders where he made his senior debut at the age of 17. In early 2008, Malik spent two weeks on trial at Italian club Torino.

Adelaide United manager Aurelio Vidmar called up Osama to the first team squad as a replacement for injured striker Paul Agostino for the FIFA Club World Cup. There, Malik made his professional debut on 14 December 2008 in the match against Gamba Osaka, replacing Cristiano in the 77th minute.

On 3 June 2009, Malik signed a one-year deal with the North Queensland Fury as an under-21 player after playing most of the last year at Adelaide Galaxy.

For the 2011–12 season, Malik signed with Adelaide United and manager Rini Coolen. However, on 17 May 2011 Adelaide United approached North Queensland Fury asking for an early release, which was granted, allowing Malik to play for Adelaide United for the remainder of the 2010–11 Season.

Malik was signed by Melbourne City in January 2016.

=== Odisha ===
In June 2022, it was announced that Indian Super League club Odisha have signed Malik on a year-long deal. On 23 August, he made his debut for the club against Kerala Blasters in the Durand Cup, in a 2–0 win.

== Personal life ==
Born in Australia, Malik is of Sudanese descent.

== Career statistics ==
=== Club ===
As of 29 April 2023

Appearances and goals by club, season and competition
Club	Season	League			Cup		AFC		Total	
Club	Season	Division	Apps	Goals	Apps	Goals	Apps	Goals	Apps	Goals
Adelaide United	2008–09	A-League	0	0	0	0	2 (Note: Appearance(s) in FIFA Club World Cup)	0	2	0
North Queensland Fury	2009–10	A-League	6	0	0	0	—		6	0
North Queensland Fury	2010–11	A-League	17	0	0	0	—		17	0
North Queensland Fury	Total		23	0	0	0	0	0	23	0
Adelaide United	2010–11	A-League	1	0	0	0	—		1	0
Adelaide United	2011–12	A-League	23	0	0	0	—		23	0
Adelaide United	2012–13	A-League	20	0	0	0	7 (Note: Appearance(s) in AFC Champions League)	0	27	0
Adelaide United	2013–14	A-League	26	2	0	0	—		26	2
Adelaide United	2014–15	A-League	18	0	2 (Note: Appearance(s) in FFA Cup)	0	—		20	0
Adelaide United	2015–16	A-League	7	0	2	0	—		9	0
Adelaide United	Total		95	2	4	0	7	0	106	2
Melbourne City	2015–16	A-League	14	0	0	0	—		14	0
Melbourne City	2016–17	A-League	18	0	3	0	—		21	0
Melbourne City	2017–18	A-League	20	0	2	0	—		22	0
Melbourne City	2018–19	A-League	5	0	2	0	—		7	0
Melbourne City	Total		57	0	7	0	0	0	64	0
Al-Batin	2018–19	Saudi Professional League	8	0	0	0	"|—		8	0
Perth Glory	2019–20	A-League	11	0	0	0	3	0	14	0
Perth Glory	2020–21	A-League	14	0	0	0	—		14	0
Perth Glory	2021–22	A-League	9	0	0	0	—		9	0
Perth Glory	Total		34	0	0	0	3	0	37	0
Odisha	2022–23	Indian Super League	15	0	8 (Note: Appearance(s) in Durand Cup) (Note: Appearance(s) in Super Cup)	0	1 (Note: Appearance(s) in Qualification for the AFC Cup group stage)	0	24	0
Career total			232	2	19	0	13	0	264	2

== Honours ==
Adelaide United

- FFA Cup: 2014

Melbourne City

- FFA Cup: 2016

Odisha

- Super Cup: 2023

Individual

- Adelaide United Rising Star: 2011–12
- Best Team Man Award: 2013–14
