= Jacob Melling =

Australian soccer player (born 1995)

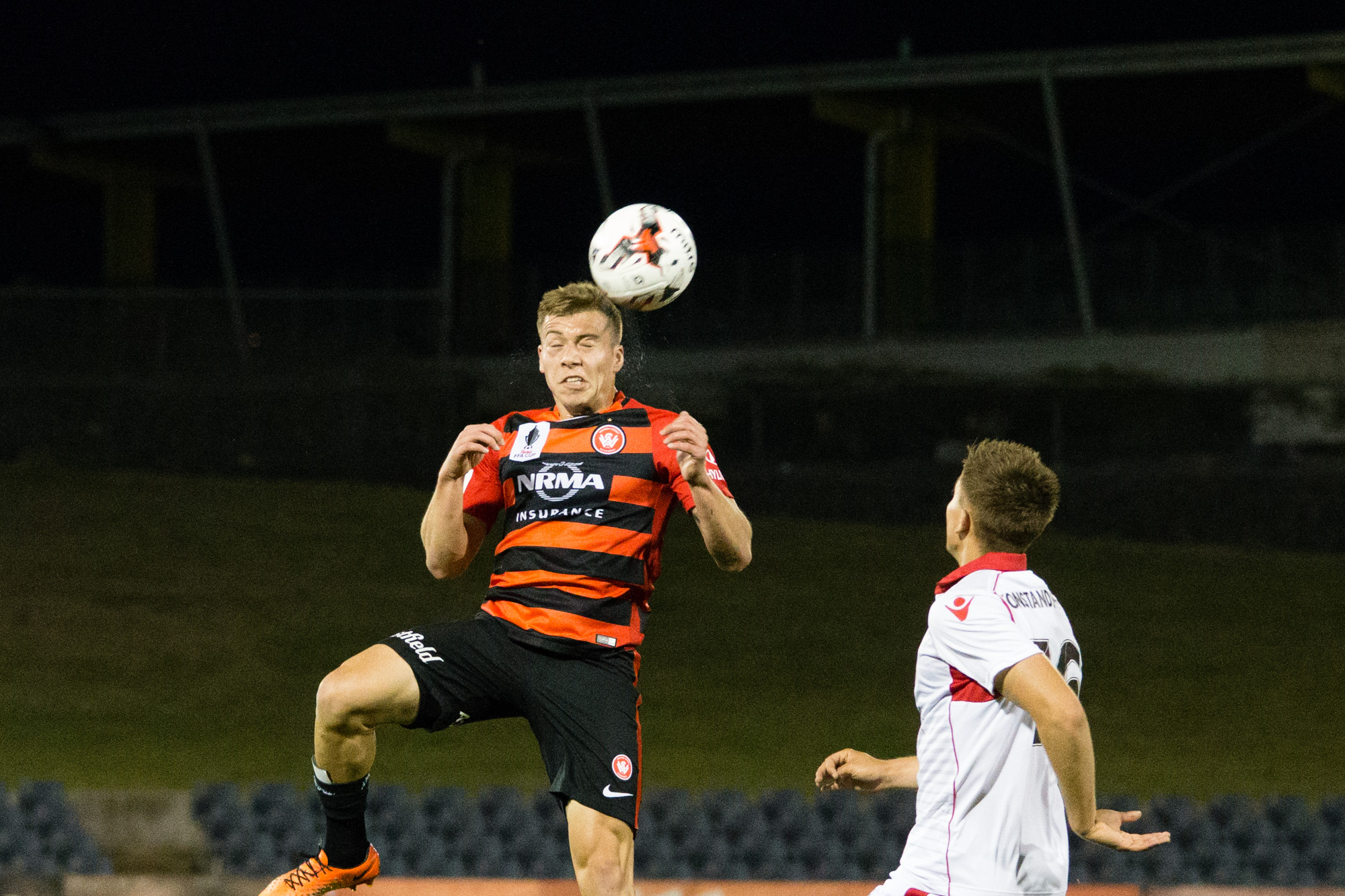
- Melling playing for Western Sydney Wanderers in 2017

Personal information
- Full name: Jacob Steven Melling
- Date of birth: 4 April 1995 (age 31)
- Place of birth: Adelaide, Australia
- Height: 1.74 m (5 ft 8 1/2 in)
- Position: Defensive midfielder

Youth career
- Modbury Jets
- 2010: SASI
- 2011: AIS

Senior career*
| Years | Team | Apps | (Gls) |
| 2012–2014 | Adelaide United | 9 | (0) |
| 2013 | Para Hills Knights | 8 | (1) |
| 2014–2016 | Melbourne City | 36 | (1) |
| 2016–2018 | Western Sydney Wanderers | 3 | (0) |
| 2018–2020 | Central Coast Mariners | 35 | (0) |
| 2021 | Terrigal United | 2 | (0) |
| 2022–2024 | Charlestown Azzurri | 20 | (6) |
| 2024 | Woongarrah Wildcats FC | | |

International career^{‡}
| 2010–2011 | Australia U17 | 11 | (0) |
- * Club domestic league appearances and goals as of 10 September 2022 ‡ National team caps and goals as of 4 July 2011

Jacob Melling (born 4 April 1995) is an Australian professional soccer player who plays as a defensive midfielder for Charlestown Azzurri.

== Biography ==
Melling attended Saint Paul's College, Gilles Plains. He was raised through the South Australian youth football setups of Modbury Jets and then the South Australian Sports Institute Football Program (SASI) before playing a key part in the South Australian side's championship win in the FFA State Institute Challenge in 2010. Melling was named Player of the Tournament, and was offered a scholarship to the Australian Institute of Sport Football Program where he then went on to form a mainstay in the heart of the Joeys midfield.

=== Adelaide United ===
On 18 March 2011, it was announced that Adelaide United had signed Melling on for his first professional club contract from the start of 2012.

Melling made his first team debut as a 78th minute substitution in the Round 14 match against Melbourne Heart.

On 15 March 2013, Melling was granted permission to be listed with two clubs so until the end of the end of the 2012–13 season Melling was listed with both Adelaide United and Para Hills Knights. He recorded 8 appearances with Para Hills Knights.

=== Melbourne City ===
On 20 May 2014 it was announced that Melling joined Melbourne City alongside two other youth players, Connor Chapman and James Brown.

=== Western Sydney Wanderers ===
On 12 August 2016, Melling joined Western Sydney Wanderers on a two-year deal together with teammate Jack Clisby. On 2 January 2018, he was released by Western Sydney Wanderers.

=== Central Coast Mariners ===
One day after leaving Western Sydney Wanderers, Melling joined Central Coast Mariners on a half-year deal. Melling was released by the Mariners in September 2020 at the end of the 2019–20 A-League.

== Career statistics ==
As of 25 October 2014

| Club | Season | League | | Cup | | Continental | | Total | |
| Club | Season | Apps | Goals | Apps | Goals | Apps | Goals | Apps | Goals |
|---|---|---|---|---|---|---|---|---|---|
| Adelaide United | 2011–12 | 9 | 0 | – | – | 1 | 0 | 10 | 0 |
| Adelaide United | 2012–13 | 0 | 0 | – | – | – | – | 0 | 0 |
| Adelaide United | 2013–14 | 0 | 0 | – | – | – | – | 0 | 0 |
| Adelaide United | Total | 9 | 0 | – | – | 1 | 0 | 10 | 0 |
| Para Hills Knights | 2013 | 8 | 1 | – | – | – | – | 8 | 1 |
| Para Hills Knights | Total | 8 | 1 | – | – | – | – | 8 | 1 |
| Melbourne City | 2014–15 | 1 | 0 | 0 | 0 | – | – | 1 | 0 |
| Melbourne City | Total | 1 | 0 | 0 | 0 | 0 | 0 | 1 | 0 |
| Total | | 18 | 1 | 0 | 0 | 1 | 0 | 19 | 1 |
