= Nigel Boogaard =

Australian professional footballer

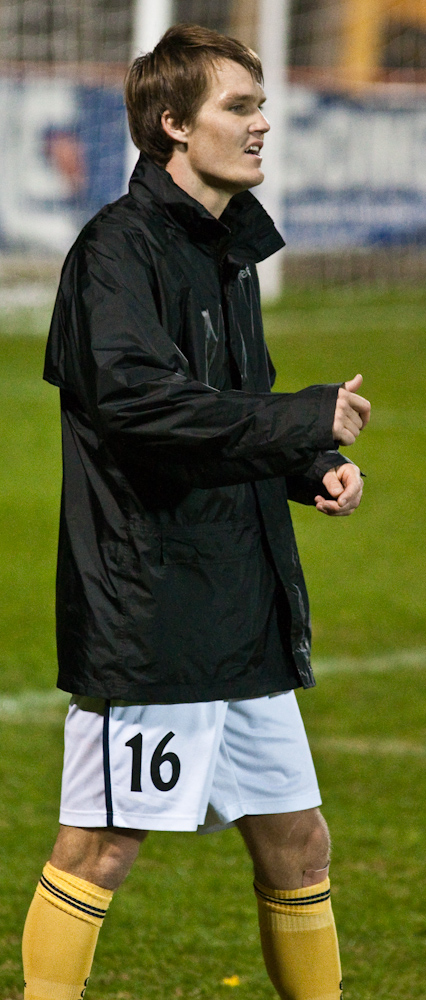
- Boogaard with the Central Coast Mariners in 2009

Personal information
- Full name: Nigel Boogaard
- Date of birth: 14 August 1986 (age 40)
- Place of birth: Newcastle, Australia
- Height: 1.88 m (6 ft 2 in)
- Position: Centre back

Youth career
- Newcastle Breakers

Senior career*
Years	Team	Apps	(Gls)
2002–2004	Newcastle United	1	(0)
2004–2005	Central Coast Lightning	8	(0)
2005–2010	Central Coast Mariners	55	(2)
2010–2015	Adelaide United	98	(2)
2015–2021	Newcastle Jets	122	(5)
2021–2025	Charlestown Azzurri	99	(14)

International career^{‡}
2002–2003	Australia U-17	6	(0)
2008	Australia U-23	6	(0)
- * Club domestic league appearances and goals as of 8 September 2024 ‡ National team caps and goals as of 23 May 2008

Nigel Boogaard (/ˈboʊɡɑːrd/ BOH-gard; born 14 August 1986) is a former Australian professional footballer who played as a central defender in the A-League and played for Charlestown Azzurri in the Northern NSW Football National Premier Leagues competition.

== Club career ==
=== Central Coast Mariners ===
Coming from the Weston Workers Bears, Boogaard has had a rollercoaster career. He scored his first A-League goal for the Mariners in a match against bitter rivals Newcastle Jets on 14 August 2009 (also his 23rd birthday). It was a miscued header off the shoulder after poor defending and the keeper dropped it over the line.

=== Adelaide United ===
Boogaard signed with Adelaide United on 6 November 2009 and joined them for their upcoming AFC Champions League campaign.

On 8 May 2012, it was announced that Boogaard had signed for a further two years with Adelaide United.

On 20 July 2013, Boogaard started for the A-League All Stars in the inaugural A-League All Stars Game against Manchester United, a match in which the A-League All Stars were thrashed 5-1, courtesy of goals from Danny Welbeck, Jesse Lingard and Robin van Persie. Boogaard, along with Brisbane Roar forward Besart Berisha, were the only players to play out the full match.

=== Newcastle Jets ===
Boogaard signed a three-year deal with his hometown club, the Newcastle Jets, on 16 February 2015.

=== Retirement ===
On the 11th of June, 2021, Boogaard announced that he would retire, ending his sixteen-year playing career. As of this date, Boogaard is currently completing "his coaching badges", stating his plans to "give back to the game in some way".

=== Charlestown Azzurri ===
Nigel joined Charlestown Azzurri for the 2022 National Premier Leagues Northern NSW season, alongside another former A-League Men's player in Jacob Melling. Fellow former Newcastle Jets player, Taylor Regan, joined Nigel halfway through the season.

== Career statistics ==
Club	Season	A-League		Finals		Asia		Other _{1}		Total	
Club	Season	Apps	Goals	Apps	Goals	Apps	Goals	Apps	Goals	Apps	Goals
Central Coast Mariners	2005–06	1	0	0	0	0	0	0	0	1	0
Central Coast Mariners	2006–07	0	0	0	0	0	0	0	0	0	0
Central Coast Mariners	2007–08	14	0	3	0	0	0	5	1	22	1
Central Coast Mariners	2008–09	11	0	1	0	5	0	1	0	18	0
Central Coast Mariners	2009–10	25	2	0	0	0	0	0	0	25	2
Central Coast Mariners	Club subtotal	51	2	4	0	5	0	6	1	66	3
Adelaide United	2010–11	10	0	2	0	2	0	0	0	12	0
Adelaide United	2011–12	20	0	0	0	0	0	0	0	20	0
Adelaide United	2012–13	21	0	1	0	8	1	0	0	30	0
Adelaide United	2013–14	21	0	1	0	0	0	0	0	22	0
Adelaide United	2014-15	20	2	2	0	0	0	5	0	27	2
Adelaide United	Club subtotal	92	2	6	0	10	1	6	1	114	4
Newcastle Jets	2015–16	21	0	0	0	0	0	0	0	21	0
Newcastle Jets	2016–17	20	2	0	0	0	0	0	0	20	2
Newcastle Jets	2017-18	21	1	2	0	0	0	0	0	23	1
Newcastle Jets	2018-19	24	0	0	0	2	1	1	0	27	1
Newcastle Jets	2019-20	16	0	0	0	0	0	0	0	16	0
Newcastle Jets	2020-21	18	1	0	0	0	0	0	0	18	1
Newcastle Jets	Club subtotal	120	4	2	0	2	1	1	0	125	5
Charlestown Azzurri	2022	19	3	N/A		N/A		0	0	19	3
Charlestown Azzurri	2023	16	4	N/A		N/A		0	0	16	4
Charlestown Azzurri	Club subtotal	19	3	0	0	N/A		0	0	35	7
Total		311	15	12	0	17	2	13	2	353	19

_{1}Includes FFA Cup, A-League Pre-Season Challenge Cup

== Honours ==
=== Club ===
Adelaide United

- FFA Cup: 2014

=== International ===
Australia national football team

- OFC U-17 Championship: 2003

Individual

- A-League All Stars: 2013
