= Jerónimo Morales Neumann =

Argentine footballer

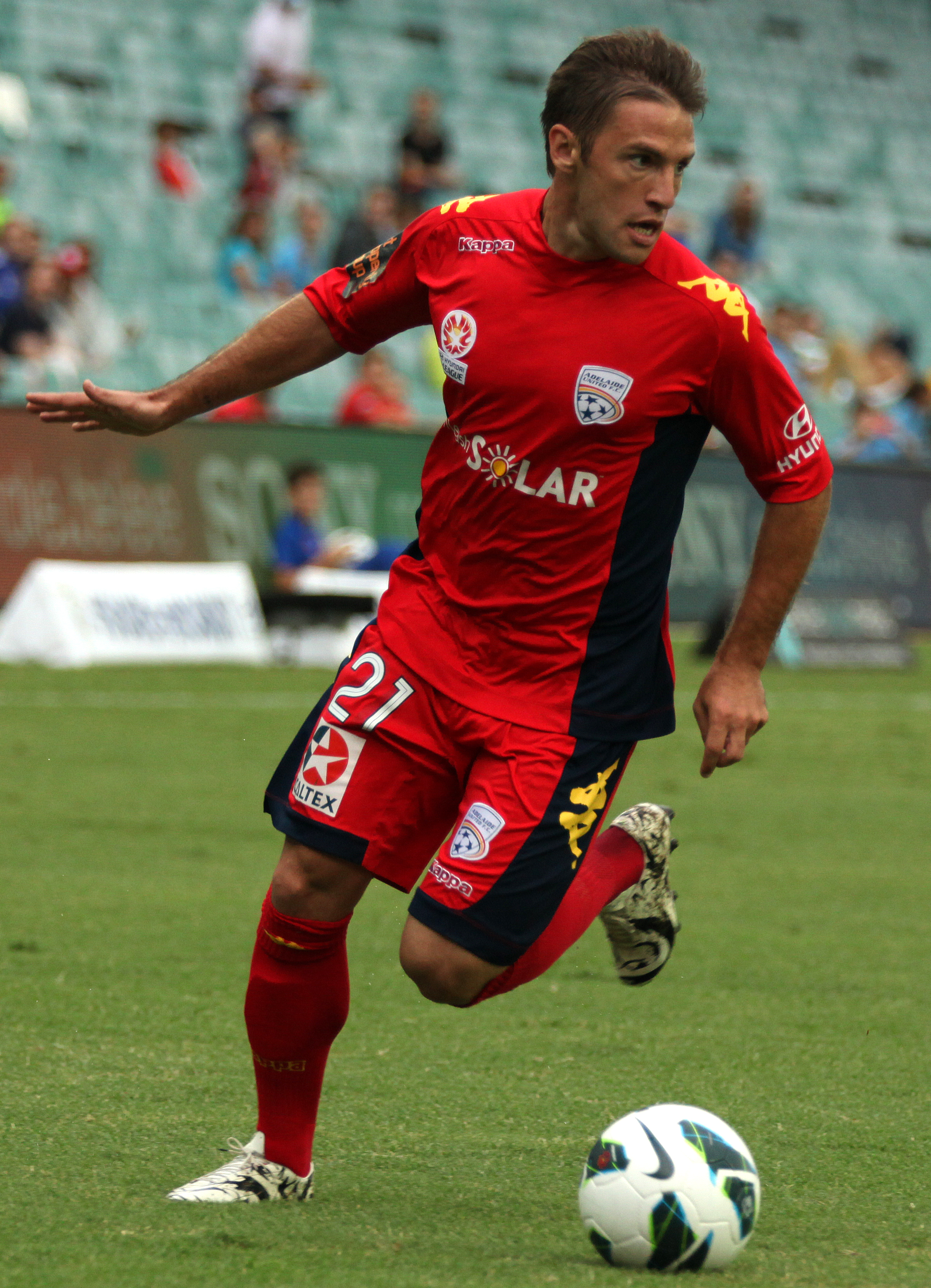
- Jerónimo playing for Adelaide United in 2013

Personal information
- Full name: Jerónimo Morales Neumann
- Date of birth: 3 June 1986 (age 40)
- Place of birth: Godoy Cruz, Mendoza, Argentina
- Height: 1.72 m (5 ft 8 in)
- Positions: Forward; winger

Senior career*
| Years | Team | Apps | (Gls) |
| 2005–2006 | River Plate | 2 | (1) |
| 2007 | CS Emelec | | |
| 2007–2008 | San Lorenzo | 1 | (0) |
| 2008–2009 | Instituto | 31 | (12) |
| 2009–2010 | Estudiantes | 15 | (5) |
| 2010–2011 | Barnsley | 5 | (0) |
| 2011 | Instituto | 14 | (5) |
| 2011–2012 | Independiente Rivadavia | 15 | (0) |
| 2012–2014 | Adelaide United | 51 | (16) |
| 2014–2015 | Newcastle Jets | 13 | (3) |
| 2015–2016 | Club Atlético Tigre | 0 | (0) |
| 2016–2017 | Independiente Rivadavia | 6 | (0) |
| Total | | 153 | (42) |
- * Club domestic league appearances and goals as of 12 May 2016

Jerónimo Morales Neumann (born 3 June 1986), known as Jerónimo, is a retired Argentine professional footballer.

== Club career ==
Jerónimo has previously played for a number of clubs in his home country, including River Plate, San Lorenzo, Instituto, Estudiantes de La Plata and Independiente Rivadavia. In February 2015, he signed for Club Atlético Tigre after a stint in Australia with Adelaide United and Newcastle Jets. On 6 January 2016, he returned to former club Independiente Rivadavia.

=== Barnsley ===
Jerónimo signed for Barnsley on 29 July 2010, signing a one-year contract with an option of a second year. He had been on trial with the South Yorkshire outfit prior to signing a permanent deal, making two appearances in pre-season games against Yorkshire rivals Huddersfield Town and Sheffield Wednesday. His first appearance for Barnsley after signing on a one-year contract, was on the same day against non-league Buxton, where he scored his first goal for the club, in a friendly match.

=== Adelaide United ===
On 10 August 2012, it was announced Jerónimo had agreed to terms with Australian club Adelaide United on a one-year contract pending a successful medical clearance. Jerónimo scored his first goal for the club in Adelaide United's 3–2 away leg loss to FC Bunyodkor in the clubs' 2012 AFC Champions League campaign. Jerónimo scored within 40 seconds of being introduced as a substitute in the 61st minute. In Round 1, he supplied a clinical ball to Dario Vidošić for the first goal, 50 seconds into the match against Newcastle Jets. Adelaide United won the match 0–2. He was subsequently named Man of the Match.

A week later he scored his first A-League goal against Western Sydney Wanderers in Adelaide on 12 October, making amends for a penalty he had earlier missed. The goal was somewhat historic, as it was the first-ever goal the Wanderers had conceded in the A-League. On 27 October, Jerónimo supplied an assist and scored two of Adelaide United's goals to help Adelaide United to a 3–1 come-from-behind victory over Wellington Phoenix at Hindmarsh Stadium in Round 4. The match was embroiled in controversy with Adelaide being awarded an offside goal. The referee later adjudged Jerónimo to be illegally tackled, which led to Wellington Phoenix defender Ben Sigmund being red carded. The Australian media judged that while Sigmund did foul Jerónimo after making contact with him, Jerónimo fell down theatrically.

It was revealed that Jerónimo was originally signed as a loan player from Paraguay club Sol de América, and was released from his contract on 12 December 2012, allowing the Argentine forward to sign on for a further two-years with the Adelaide United.

=== Newcastle Jets ===
On 18 July 2014, Jerónimo joined Newcastle Jets. He scored his first goal for the club in the 2–1 away defeat to Perth Glory on 1 November 2014. His contract was terminated by mutual consent by the Jets on 4 February 2015.
