= Evan Kostopoulos =

Australian soccer player

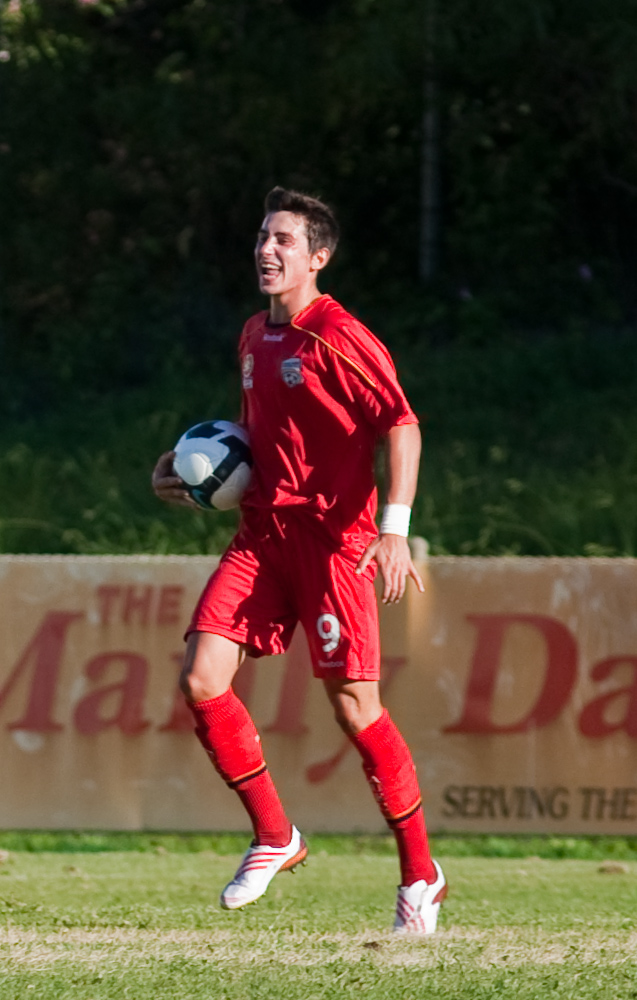

Personal information
- Date of birth: 7 May 1990 (age 36)
- Place of birth: Adelaide, Australia
- Height: 1.85 m (6 ft 1 in)
- Positions: Striker; winger

Team information
- Current team: West Adelaide

Youth career
- West Adelaide
- Adelaide Olympic
- Croydon Kings
- 2009–2013: Adelaide United

Senior career*
Years	Team	Apps	(Gls)
2007–2008	Adelaide Olympic	21	(6)
2009	Adelaide Comets	18	(4)
2010–2013	Adelaide United	21	(3)
2010	→ Adelaide Cobras (loan)	5	(1)
2013–2014	Sydney Olympic	15	(7)
2014–2015	South China	14	(5)
2015–2016	Adelaide Comets	28	(12)
2017–2020	Adelaide City	83	(17)
2021–	West Adelaide	42	(1)
- * Club domestic league appearances and goals as of 14 September 2022

Evan Kostopoulos (Greek: Ηβάν Κωστόπουλος, born 7 May 1990) is an Australian footballer who plays for National Premier Leagues club Adelaide City FC.

== Club career ==
=== AEK Athens and Panionios ===
In 2006–2007 season, Evan Kostopoulos had spent time on trial with Super League Greece clubs AEK Athens and Panionios where he declined offers to return to Australia.

In 2007–2008 season, Kostopoulos played his first senior football game for South Australian Premier League club Adelaide Olympic where he was able to make 21 appearances scoring 6 goals.

In 2008–2009 season, Kostopoulos signed for then South Australian Premier League club Adelaide Comets where he played 18 games scoring 4 goals.

=== Adelaide United ===
In January 2010 Kostopoulos signed for Adelaide United in A-League. On 30 January 2010, Kostopoulos made his senior debut for Adelaide United replacing Adam Hughes in the 79th minute in the match against Wellington Phoenix. At the end of the 2009–2010 A-League season Kostopoulos was loaned to Adelaide Cobras for 2010–2011 season.

On 14 April 2012, in the 2011–2012 A-League season it was announced that Kostopoulos had signed a one-year undisclosed contract with Adelaide United until the end of the 2012–2013 A-League season. Kostopoulos scored his first A-League goal against Melbourne Victory in a 4–2 home victory.

=== Sydney Olympic FC ===
In November 2013, Evan Kostopoulos met with Sydney Olympic FC officials and signed a deal with the Belmore-based club. His signature has been met with much praise from fans already, given his proven quality in the A-League.
