= Marcelo Carrusca =

Argentine-Australian footballer (born 1983)

Personal information
- Full name: Marcelo Adrián Carrusca
- Date of birth: 1 September 1983 (age 43)
- Place of birth: La Plata, Buenos Aires, Argentina
- Height: 1.78 m (5 ft 10 in)
- Position: Attacking midfielder

Senior career*
| Years | Team | Apps | (Gls) |
| 2001–2006 | Estudiantes | 103 | (12) |
| 2006–2009 | Galatasaray | 15 | (1) |
| 2008–2009 | → Cruz Azul (loan) | 11 | (1) |
| 2009–2011 | Estudiantes | 18 | (2) |
| 2010–2011 | → Banfield (loan) | 23 | (2) |
| 2011–2012 | San Martín de San Juan | 23 | (2) |
| 2012–2017 | Adelaide United | 114 | (25) |
| 2017–2018 | Melbourne City | 3 | (0) |
| 2018 | Western Sydney Wanderers | 12 | (1) |
| 2019 | West Adelaide | 4 | (0) |
| Total | | 326 | (46) |

International career
| 2003–2004 | Argentina U20 | 16 | (3) |
- * Club domestic league appearances and goals

Marcelo Adrián Carrusca (Latin American Spanish: [maɾˈselo aˈðɾjaŋ kaˈruska]; (Note: In isolation, Adrián is pronounced [aˈðɾjan].) born 1 September 1983), is an Argentine-Australian former professional footballer who played as an attacking midfielder, and is the current Head of Junior Development for Adelaide United.

Born in La Plata, Carrusca started his professional career at Estudiantes de La Plata before moving to Turkish side Galatasaray in 2006. After spending a season on loan for Mexican club Cruz Azul, Carrusca returned to Estudiantes in 2009, playing one further season at the club and one on loan at Banfield. After one season with San Martín de San Juan, Carrusca moved to A-League club Adelaide United in 2012, where he played for five seasons.

Carrusca has represented Argentina under-20, including in the victorious 2003 South American U-20 Championship team and the 2003 FIFA World Youth Championship. He obtained Australian citizenship in 2017.

== Club career ==
Carrusca is a product of Estudiantes de La Plata's youth divisions. He made his first appearance for the club in 2001, and played 103 league games (12 goals) for the team until 2006.

On 27 July 2006 he signed for Turkish club Galatasaray, opting for a five-year contract worth around €1.8 million. He played one year for the club, but on 25 July 2007 Galatasaray manager Karl Heinz Feldkamp reported officially that he did not wish to keep Carrusca on the team and asked the board to sell him in order to open space for a new foreign transfer.

After lack of first team appearances in Galatasaray, he was loaned for one year to Mexican Primera División team Cruz Azul for 2008–09 football season. He then re-joined Estudiantes to play with the team during the 2009-10 Argentine Primera División season and the 2009 FIFA Club World Cup.

On 8 July 2010, Carrusca joined Banfield on loan from Estudiantes to replace recently transferred left winger James Rodríguez.

=== Adelaide United ===
On 3 August 2012, it was announced Carrusca had agreed to sign with A-League club Adelaide United on an undisclosed two-year contract.

Carrusca scored a goal and assisted a further two in a man of the match performance during Adelaide United's 4–2 home win over Melbourne Victory on 7 December 2012, in Round 10 of the A-League.

On 23 May 2017, Carrusca became an Australian citizen, and can be included as a non-visa player in the A-League.

In July 2017 it was confirmed that Carrusca would not re-sign with Adelaide under new coach Marco Kurz.

=== Melbourne City ===
On 12 September 2017, A-League club Melbourne City announced it had signed Carrusca on a one-year deal.

=== Western Sydney Wanderers ===
On 11 January 2018, Carrusca and Melbourne City mutually terminated his contract, and he signed for Western Sydney Wanderers until the end of the 2017–18 A-League season.

=== Retirement ===
In May 2019, Carrusca announced his retirement from playing to focus on coaching. He now runs his own academy in Adelaide for children and young players.

== International career ==
Carrusca played as an U-20 Argentina international. He scored 2 goals in 16 appearances and was a member of the Argentina Under-20 team at the 2003 FIFA World Youth Championship.

== Honours ==
Galatasaray

- Turkish League: 2007–08

Adelaide United

- A-League Championship: 2015–16
- A-League Premiership: 2015–16
- FFA Cup: 2014

Argentina

- CONMEBOL U-20 Championship: 2003

Individual

- A-League PFA Team of the Season: 2012–13, 2013–14, 2014–15
- A-League All Star: 2013, 2014
