= Fábio Ferreira (footballer, born 1989) =

Portuguese footballer

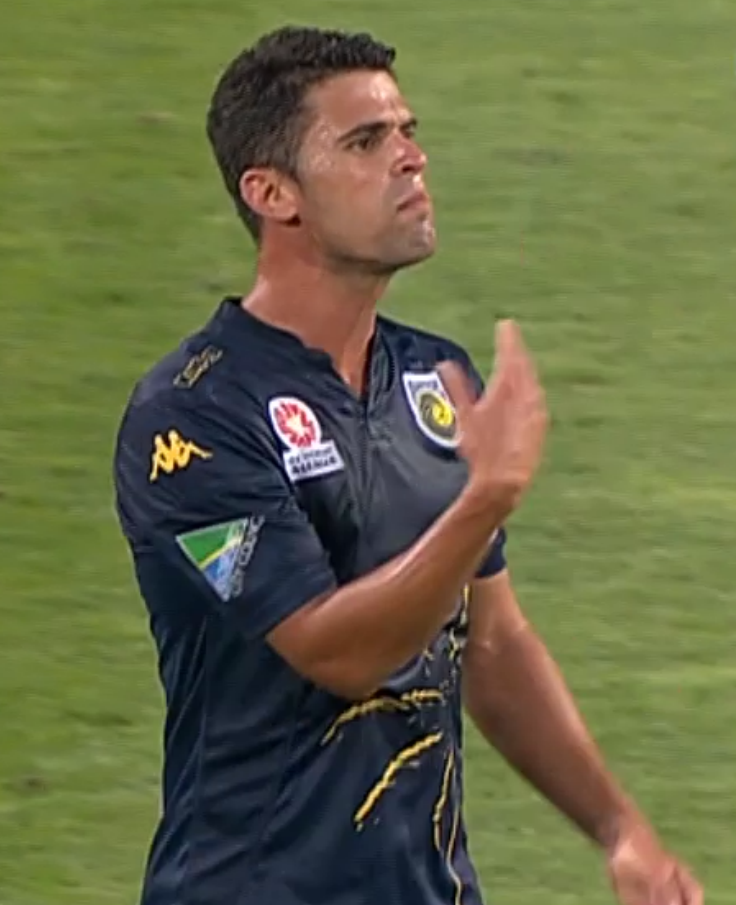
- Ferreira with Central Coast Mariners in 2016

Personal information
- Full name: Fábio Miguel Lourenço Ferreira
- Date of birth: 3 May 1989 (age 37)
- Place of birth: Barreiro, Portugal
- Height: 1.78 m (5 ft 10 in)
- Positions: Winger; attacking midfielder

Youth career
- 2001–2002: Seixal
- 2002–2005: Sporting CP
- 2005–2008: Chelsea

Senior career*
Years	Team	Apps	(Gls)
2008–2009	Chelsea	0	(0)
2009	→ Oldham Athletic (loan)	1	(0)
2009–2010	Esmoriz	19	(1)
2010–2011	Sertanense	9	(0)
2012	Dulwich Hill	12	(8)
2012–2015	Adelaide United	51	(14)
2015–2017	Central Coast Mariners	55	(15)
2017	PKNS	6	(0)
2018	Sydney FC	5	(0)
2018–2019	Perth Glory	13	(2)
2019	Adelaide City	8	(3)
2020–2023	Sydney Olympic	68	(8)
Total		247	(51)

International career
2004	Portugal U16	3	(0)
2005–2006	Portugal U17	11	(0)
2006–2007	Portugal U18	5	(0)
2007	Portugal U19	2	(0)
- * Club domestic league appearances and goals

Fábio Miguel Lourenço Ferreira (Portuguese pronunciation: [ˈfaβju fɨˈʁɐjɾɐ]; born 3 May 1989) is a Portuguese former professional footballer who played mainly as a right winger but also as an attacking midfielder.

Registered at Sporting CP and Chelsea as a teenager, he only played lower-league football in both England and Portugal. In 2012 he moved to Australia, where he represented Adelaide United, Central Coast Mariners, Sydney FC, Perth Glory, Adelaide City and Sydney Olympic.

== Club career ==
=== Early years and Chelsea ===
Born in Barreiro, Setúbal, Ferreira joined Sporting CP's youth system in 2002, aged 13. On 6 January 2005, it was reported that the Lisbon side had made a complaint to FIFA regarding him and two other players who had trained with Chelsea without any authorisation. However, in the summer, he still made a move to the English club.

In the following season, Ferreira became a professional and signed a contract with the Blues. During 2007–08, he made 12 appearances for the reserves and scored eight goals.

On 20 January 2009, Ferreira was loaned out to League One team Oldham Athletic on a one-month loan deal, before it was extended for another month on 23 March. The following day, he made his professional debut in a 1–1 draw against Cheltenham Town at Whaddon Road, coming on as a substitute for Deane Smalley in the 66th minute: a few minutes after coming onto the pitch he nearly scored, putting a header wide of the goal.

Released by Chelsea in summer 2009, Ferreira went on trial with League Two team Gillingham, but nothing came of it. He resumed his career in the Portuguese third division.

=== Adelaide United ===
In February 2012, Ferreira signed for Dulwich Hill FC in Australia. He scored twice on his NSW League One debut, on 24 March.

After becoming one of his team's key players, Ferreira went on trial with A-League club Adelaide United FC, being subsequently offered a contract. On 6 August 2012 it was announced that he would sign, and he penned a one-year contract later that month.

Ferreira scored his debut league goal on 23 November 2012, a 2–1 away victory over Sydney FC – he opened the scoring in the 20th minute with a sharp drive into the left corner of the net, shooting from the right-hand corner of the box. Two weeks later, he assisted the first goal and netted his team's second in a 4–2 rivalry derby win against Melbourne Victory FC at Hindmarsh Stadium.

On 14 December 2012, Ferreira signed a two-year extension with Adelaide United.

=== Central Coast Mariners ===
On 27 January 2015, Adelaide United announced that it had agreed to terminate Ferreira's contract effective immediately. The very same day, he joined fellow league club Central Coast Mariners FC for two and a half years. He made his debut for the latter on 13 February, starting in a 0–2 home loss to Brisbane Roar FC, and scored his first goal a week later against Sydney, helping the team come from behind to lead but in an eventual 4–2 defeat at the Sydney Football Stadium. He ended his first season in Gosford with three goals from nine games, the other being on 7 March when he finished Isaka Cernak's free kick for the only goal at home against Melbourne City FC.

Ferreira scored twice in Central Coast's first game of the 2015–16 campaign, inspiring them to a 3–2 home win over Perth Glory FC on 10 October. On 21 February, he was sent off in a 4–1 loss at Melbourne City.

In April 2017, it was announced that Ferreira was leaving the Mariners to sign with a club in Malaysia.

=== Sydney FC ===
Following a trial, Ferreira signed a short-term deal with Sydney FC on 2 February 2018. At the end of the season, being considered surplus to requirements, he was not offered an extension.

=== Perth Glory ===
On 10 July 2018, Ferreira joined Perth Glory. In March 2019, he applied for Australian citizenship to play as a local in the A-League.

== Honours ==
Adelaide United

- FFA Cup: 2014

Sydney FC

- A-League Premiership: 2017–18

Perth Glory

- A-League Premiership: 2018–19

Sydney Olympic

- National Premier Leagues NSW Minor Premiership: 2022
