= Teeboy Kamara =

Australian soccer player (born 1996)

Personal information
- Full name: Teeboy Kamara
- Date of birth: 18 May 1996 (age 30)
- Place of birth: Liberia
- Height: 1.75 m (5 ft 9 in)
- Position: Forward

Team information
- Current team: Adelaide Olympic

Youth career
- Croydon Kings
- Salisbury United
- S.A.S.I.
- 2011: A.I.S.
- 2011–2014: Adelaide United

Senior career*
Years	Team	Apps	(Gls)
2011–2014	Adelaide United	1	(0)
2014	Inglewood United	15	(6)
2015–2016	Stirling Lions	41	(15)
2018	Nunawading City	0	(0)
2018	Melbourne Knights	12	(2)
2019–2021	Green Gully	40	(6)
2022	Preston Lions	0	(0)
2022–2023	Bayswater City	23	(1)
2024–	Adelaide Olympic	21	(1)

International career^{‡}
2012	Australia U17	5	(0)
- * Club domestic league appearances and goals as of 19 September 2024 ‡ National team caps and goals as of 16 December 2011

Teeboy Kamara (born 18 May 1996) is a soccer player who plays as a forward for Bayswater City in the NPL WA. Born in Liberia, he has represented Australia at youth level.

== Early life ==
Kamara was born in on 18 May 1996 in Liberia. He left with his mother and siblings, arriving in Australia as a refugee at the age of six in 2002, to escape the civil war in his homeland. His stepfather was the goalkeeper coach of the Liberia national football team.

== Youth career ==
As a youth, Kamara played for Croydon Kings, Salisbury United, and Adelaide United (2011–2014). He also took part in programs at the South Australian Sports Institute and Australian Institute of Sport.

== Club career ==
=== Adelaide United ===
In 2011, Kamara signed with A-League club Adelaide United. He made his professional debut in the 2011–12 A-League season on 16 December 2011, in a round 11 clash against Gold Coast United making him the youngest player to make a senior appearance in the competition at 15 years and 212 days old. He also made an additional two appearances in the Asian Champions League for Adelaide.

On 21 December 2011 it was announced he had signed a three-year senior contract with Adelaide United with the contract beginning on his 16th birthday, 18 May 2012.

However, in spite of a promising start to his career, Kamara was sidelined with what was later revealed to be hepatitis A over a two-year period. Having contracted the illness on a youth tour of China to play in the Weifang Cup, his illness became so severe that a liver transplant was considered by his physicians. He was eventually released from his contract by the club.

=== State league career ===
Kamara was subsequently signed by Inglewood United to play in the NPL WA.

He has continued to feature for various clubs in the National Premier Leagues in both Victoria and Western Australia.

== Other appearances ==
Kamara has played in the African Nations Cup of South Australia.
