= Jake Barker-Daish =

Australian soccer player (born 1993)

Personal information
- Full name: Jake Barker-Daish
- Date of birth: 7 May 1993 (age 33)
- Place of birth: Darwin, Australia
- Height: 1.79 m (5 ft 10 in)
- Position: Central midfielder

Youth career
- 2009: VIS
- 2009–2011: AIS
- 2011–2012: Gold Coast United

Senior career*
Years	Team	Apps	(Gls)
2008–2009	Altona Magic	1	(0)
2012	Gold Coast United	7	(0)
2012–2014	Adelaide United	19	(2)
2014	Colne	2	(0)
2015	South Melbourne	22	(2)
2016	Richmond SC	27	(9)
2017	Melbourne Knights	3	(0)
2018	Moreland Zebras	12	(0)
2021	Moreland Zebras	13	(0)
2024–2025	Sandringham SC	12	(1)

International career^{‡}
2011–2013	Australia U20	17	(4)
2014	Australia U23	3	(0)
- * Club domestic league appearances and goals as of 8 September 2021 ‡ National team caps and goals as of 17 January 2014

Jake Barker-Daish (born 7 May 1993) is an Australian former soccer player who last played as a midfielder for Moreland Zebras. He represented Australia at youth level, and played for both Gold Coast United and Adelaide United in the A-League. In the 2010–11 season, Barker-Daish won the Australian Institute of Sport Player of the Year.

After his career was cut short by injury, Barker-Daish started up The Unlaced Podcast, where he interviews fellow professional sportspeople and celebrities.

== Club career ==
=== Youth career ===
Barker-Daish was selected for the Australian Institute of Sport at just 15 years of age.

=== Gold Coast United ===
In 2011 Barker-Daish signed with A-League club Gold Coast United. He made his professional debut in the 2011–12 A-League season on 17 February 2012, in a round 21 clash against Melbourne Heart. He made seven appearances for Gold Coast United, where he managed to gain 3 assists in his first two starts.

=== Adelaide United ===
On 6 April 2012, it was announced that Barker-Daish had signed for Adelaide United in the A-League. He would feature in 19 appearances over two injury-interrupted seasons for the Reds, scoring two goals in his time there.

=== Colne ===
After being released from Adelaide United, Barker-Daish signed a short-term contract with North West Counties Football League side Colne F.C. He made two league appearances and made two appearances in the Men United Cup winning the man of the match award in a match against Silsden F.C., a match in which he also scored the winning goal.

=== NPL Victoria ===
In February 2015, Barker-Daish signed for South Melbourne in the NPL.

He then joined newly promoted Richmond SC in February 2016. Despite scoring nine goals for the club and winning the club's Most Valuable Player award, they were unable to escape relegation, losing 4–0 to North Geelong Warriors in the promotion-relegation playoff.

Barker-Daish joined Melbourne Knights for the 2017 season. Due to a serious hip injury his season was cut short and was unable to continue to play for the club after round 3 of the 2017 season.

== International career ==
Barker-Daish represented his country at the 2011 FIFA U-20 World Cup in Colombia.
