= 2015–16 Adelaide United FC season =

12th season in existence of Adelaide United FC

Adelaide United
2015–16 season
- Chairman: Greg Griffin
- Manager: Guillermo Amor
- Stadium: Adelaide Oval; Coopers Stadium
- A-League: Premiers
- A-League Finals: Champions
- FFA Cup: Quarter-finals
- AFC Champions League: Qualifying play-off
- Top goalscorer: League: Bruce Djite (9); All: Bruce Djite; Pablo Sánchez (11)
- Highest home attendance: 50,119 vs. Western Sydney Wanderers (1 May 2016); A-League Grand Final
- Lowest home attendance: 5,066 vs. Sydney FC (26 August 2015); FFA Cup
- Average home league attendance: 11,287
- Biggest win: 6–1 vs. Darwin Olympic (A) (5 August 2015); FFA Cup
- Biggest defeat: 0–3 vs. Brisbane Roar (A) (31 October 2015); A-League
Home colours	Away colours

The 2015–16 season was the 12th in the history of Adelaide United Football Club since its establishment in 2003. The club participated in the A-League for the 11th time, the FFA Cup for the second time and the AFC Champions League for the fifth time.

Ahead of the season, manager Josep Gombau stood down, citing family reasons. He was replaced by the club's technical director, Guillermo Amor, in his first senior managerial role. Adelaide United were knocked out of the FFA Cup in the quarter-finals by rivals Melbourne Victory, their first loss in the competition's history. Two and a half weeks later, Adelaide would begin their season by hosting Victory at Adelaide Oval, a match that ended 0–0. The Reds went winless in their first eight games and sat 13 points from the top of the ladder. From round nine onwards, the club went on a 14-match unbeaten run, which saw them sit atop the ladder by the end of it, following a 4–0 win over Wellington Phoenix. A loss to Melbourne City and a draw with the Western Sydney Wanderers put their title charge in doubt. Adelaide won their remaining three matches and thanks to Melbourne Victory's draw with Brisbane Roar in the final round, Adelaide United were premiers by a solitary point.

Adelaide played Melbourne City in the semi-final. After a scoreless first half, Bruce Djite broke the deadlock in the 48th minute, curling the ball into the top right corner from outside the box. Djite would double their lead from the penalty spot 12 minutes later. Fitzgerald pulled a goal back for Melbourne City, but late goals from Dylan McGowan and Pablo Sánchez saw Adelaide into their third Grand Final, which would also be their first time hosting the match. Second-placed Western Sydney Wanderers travelled to Adelaide Oval for the Grand Final. Bruce Kamau scored in the 21st minute and won a free kick that was converted by Isaías in the 32nd minute. Scott Neville's goal just shy of the hour mark brought the Wanderers back into the game, but Adelaide held on, with Pablo Sánchez eventually scoring Adelaide's third to seal the win. This was Adelaide United's first Australian title, and to this day, their last Grand Final they have played in.

Despite the success, Adelaide lost numerous key players ahead of next season, including Bruce Kamau, Pablo Sánchez, Craig Goodwin, Stefan Mauk and Bruce Djite.

== Kits ==
Home	Away	Goalkeeper 1	Cup Home	Cup Away

== Coaching staff ==
Position	Name
Head coach	(Spain) Guillermo Amor
Assistant coaches	(Spain) Pau Martí (Australia) Michael Valkanis
General manager	(Australia) Ante Kovacevic
Goalkeeping coach	(Australia) Peter Blazincic
High performance manager	(Australia) Greg King
Club doctor	(Australia) James Ilic
Head trainer	(Australia) Peter Duke
Head physiotherapist	(Australia) Peter Chitti

== Players ==
=== Squad ===
Note: Flags indicate national team as defined under FIFA eligibility rules; some limited exceptions apply. Players may hold more than one non-FIFA nationality.

No.	Pos.	Nation	Player
1	GK	AUS	Eugene Galekovic (Captain)
2	DF	AUS	Michael Marrone
3	DF	ITA	Iacopo La Rocca
4	DF	AUS	Dylan McGowan
6	MF	AUS	Stefan Mauk
7	FW	ESP	Pablo Sánchez
8	MF	ESP	Isaías
9	FW	ESP	Sergio Cirio
10	MF	ARG	Marcelo Carrusca
11	FW	AUS	Bruce Djite
12	DF	AUS	Mark Ochieng (Youth)

No.	Pos.	Nation	Player
13	MF	AUS	Dylan Smith (Youth)
14	MF	AUS	George Mells
15	DF	AUS	Ben Warland (Youth)
16	DF	AUS	Craig Goodwin
17	FW	AUS	Mate Dugandzic
19	FW	AUS	Eli Babalj (on loan from AZ)
20	GK	AUS	John Hall
21	DF	AUS	Tarek Elrich
23	DF	AUS	Jordan Elsey
24	FW	AUS	Bruce Kamau
80	GK	AUS	John Solari

== Transfers and contracts ==
=== Transfers in ===
No.	Position	Player	From	Type/fee	Contract length	Date	Ref
3	DF	(Italy) Iacopo La Rocca	Western Sydney Wanderers	Free transfer	2 years	27 June 2015	
14	MF	George Mells	(England) Southampton	Free transfer	1 year	4 July 2015	
19	FW	Eli Babalj	(Netherlands) AZ Alkmaar	Loan	1 year	26 July 2015	
17	FW	Mate Dugandzic	Unattached	Free transfer	1 year	16 August 2015	
6	MF	Stefan Mauk	Melbourne City	Player swap	2.5 years	23 January 2016	
18	FW	(Indonesia) Sergio van Dijk	Unattached	Guest player	1 week	3 February 2016	

=== Transfers out ===
No.	Position	Player	To	Type/fee	Date	Ref
3	DF	Nigel Boogaard	Newcastle Jets	Free transfer	30 June 2015	
14	MF	Cameron Watson	Unattached	End of contract	30 June 2015	
19	FW	(Spain) Miguel Palanca	Unattached	End of contract	30 June 2015	
20	GK	Paul Izzo	Central Coast Mariners	Free transfer	8 July 2015	
17	FW	Awer Mabil	(Denmark) Midtjylland	$1,300,000	20 July 2015	
32	MF	Nathan Konstandopoulos	Unattached	Mutual termination	28 December 2015	
5	MF	Osama Malik	Melbourne City	Player swap	23 January 2016	
18	MF	James Jeggo	(Austria) Sturm Graz	$400,000	27 January 2016	
18	FW	(Indonesia) Sergio van Dijk	Unattached	End of contract	9 February 2016	

=== Contract extensions ===
No.	Position	Player	Contract length	Date	Ref
20	GK	John Hall	2 years	11 August 2015	
21	DF	Tarek Elrich	3 years	29 September 2015	
23	DF	Jordan Elsey	1.5 years	23 February 2016	

== Pre-season and friendlies ==
15 July 2015	Adelaide United	0–2	(England) Manchester City	Gold Coast
17:00 AEST		Report	Barker 63'; Zuculini 84'	Stadium: Cbus Super Stadium; Attendance: 0 (behind closed doors)

20 July 2015	Adelaide United	0–2	(England) Liverpool	Adelaide
19:00 ACST		Report	Milner 68'; Ings 88'	Stadium: Adelaide Oval; Attendance: 53,008; Referee: Armando Villarreal

28 July 2015	Adelaide Blue Eagles	0–5	Adelaide United	Adelaide
19:00 ACST		Report	Carrusca 28', 64'; Djite 33'; Sánchez 63', 73'	Stadium: Marden Sports Complex; Referee: Rick Schneider

19 August 2015	Alice Springs All Stars (Northern Territory)	0–11	Adelaide United	Alice Springs
19:00 ACST		Report	Smith 7', 12'; Sánchez 28', 41'; Babalj 53', 65'; Cirio 68', 82', 86'; Carrusca 73', 77' (pen.)	Stadium: Traeger Park; Attendance: 586

21 August 2015	Adelaide United	4–3	Melbourne City	Darwin
19:00 ACST	Sánchez 18'; Dugandzic 52'; Jeggo 80'; Goodwin 86'	Report	Espindola 16'; Germano 29'; Mauk 37'	Stadium: Darwin Football Stadium; Attendance: 1,600

10 September 2015	Adelaide Comets	1–2	Adelaide United	Adelaide
19:00 ACST	Tesfaqabr 71'	Report	McGowan 28'; Mells 53'	Stadium: Santos Stadium; Attendance: 300

16 September 2015	Melbourne City	1–3	Adelaide United	Melbourne
13:00 AEST	Dekker 90'	Report	Jeggo 16'; Carrusca 21'; Cirio 58'	Stadium: City Football Academy; Attendance: 0 (behind closed doors)

1 October 2015	Sydney FC	0–2	Adelaide United	Sydney
15:30 AEST		Report	Djite 67', 87'	Stadium: Leichhardt Oval

== Competitions ==
=== Overall record ===
Competition	First match	Last match	Starting round	Final position	Record							
Competition	First match	Last match	Starting round	Final position	Pld	W	D	L	GF	GA	GD	Win %
A-League	9 October 2015	8 April 2016	Matchday 1	Winners	27	14	7	6	45	28	+17	51.85
A-League Finals	22 April 2016	1 May 2016	Semi-finals	Winners	2	2	0	0	7	2	+5	100.00
FFA Cup	5 August 2015	22 September 2015	Round of 32	Quarter-finals	3	2	0	1	9	5	+4	66.67
Champions League	9 February 2016	9 February 2016	Qualifying play-off	Qualifying play-off	1	0	0	1	1	2	−1	0.00
Total					33	18	7	8	62	37	+25	54.55

Last updated: 1 May 2016
Source: Soccerway

=== A-League ===
==== League table ====
Pos	Team	Pld	W	D	L	GF	GA	GD	Pts	Qualification
1	Adelaide United (C)	27	14	7	6	45	28	+17	49	Qualification for 2017 AFC Champions League group stage and Finals series
2	Western Sydney Wanderers	27	14	6	7	44	33	+11	48	Qualification for 2017 AFC Champions League group stage and Finals series
3	Brisbane Roar	27	14	6	7	49	40	+9	48	Qualification for 2017 AFC Champions League second preliminary round and Finals series
4	Melbourne City	27	13	5	9	63	44	+19	44	Qualification for Finals series
5	Perth Glory	27	13	4	10	49	42	+7	43	Qualification for Finals series
6	Melbourne Victory	27	11	8	8	40	33	+7	41	Qualification for Finals series
7	Sydney FC	27	8	10	9	36	36	0	34	
8	Newcastle Jets	27	8	6	13	28	41	−13	30	
9	Wellington Phoenix (Note: Wellington Phoenix cannot qualify for the AFC Champions League as they are not recognised as an AFC club.)	27	7	4	16	34	54	−20	25	
10	Central Coast Mariners	27	3	4	20	33	70	−37	13	

Source: A-Leagues
Rules for classification: 1) points; 2) goal difference; 3) number of goals scored.
(C) Champions

==== Results summary ====
Overall								Home						Away					
Pld	W	D	L	GF	GA	GD	Pts	W	D	L	GF	GA	GD	W	D	L	GF	GA	GD
27	14	7	6	45	28	+17	49	7	4	2	22	12	+10	7	3	4	23	16	+7

Last updated: 8 April 2016.
Source: ultimatealeague.com

==== Results by round ====
Round	1	2	3	4	5	6	7	8	9	10	11	12	13	14	15	16	17	18	19	20	21	22	23	24	25	26	27
Ground	H	H	A	A	H	A	H	A	H	H	A	H	A	A	H	A	H	H	A	A	H	A	H	A	H	A	A
Result	D	D	L	L	L	L	D	L	W	W	D	W	D	W	W	W	W	D	W	W	W	W	L	D	W	W	W
Position	6	8	9	10	10	10	10	10	8	8	9	7	7	6	6	6	6	6	3	3	2	1	3	4	3	2	1
Points	1	2	2	2	2	2	3	3	6	9	10	13	14	17	20	23	26	27	30	33	36	39	39	40	43	46	49

Source: ultimatealeague
A = Away; H = Home; W = Win; D = Draw; L = Loss

==== Matches ====
9 October 2015 1	Adelaide United	0–0	Melbourne Victory	Adelaide
19:10 ACDT		Report		Stadium: Adelaide Oval; Attendance: 19,079; Referee: Peter Green

16 October 2015 2	Adelaide United	1–1	Western Sydney Wanderers	Adelaide
19:10 ACDT	Andreu 21' (o.g.)	Report	Andreu 83'	Stadium: Coopers Stadium; Attendance: 9,442; Referee: Chris Beath

25 October 2015 3	Perth Glory	3–1	Adelaide United	Perth
16:00 AWST	Sidnei 44'; Fernandez 60'; Castro 72'	Report	D. Ferreira 75' (o.g.)	Stadium: nib Stadium; Attendance: 7,728; Referee: Adam Fielding

31 October 2015 4	Brisbane Roar	3–0	Adelaide United	Brisbane
18:30 AEST	Borrello 9', 90+2'; Maclaren 79'	Report		Stadium: Suncorp Stadium; Attendance: 10,707; Referee: Chris Beath

5 November 2015 5	Adelaide United	2–4	Melbourne City	Adelaide
19:30 ACDT	Cirio 66'; Sánchez 85' (pen.)	Report	Paartalu 8'; Mooy 35'; Fornaroli 56', 71'	Stadium: Coopers Stadium; Attendance: 8,632; Referee: Kris Griffiths-Jones

13 November 2015 6	Wellington Phoenix	4–2	Adelaide United	Wellington
19:30 NZDT	Krishna 4'; Bonevacia 22', 51'; Ridenton 68'	Report	Goodwin 3'; Sánchez 89'	Stadium: Westpac Stadium; Attendance: 13,584; Referee: Ben Williams

22 November 2015 7	Adelaide United	0–0	Newcastle Jets	Adelaide
16:30 ACDT		Report		Stadium: Coopers Stadium; Attendance: 10,048; Referee: Shaun Evans

28 November 2015 8	Melbourne Victory	2–1	Adelaide United	Melbourne
19:30 AEDT	Berisha 14' (pen.); Bozanic 30'	Report	Carrusca 87' (pen.)	Stadium: Etihad Stadium; Attendance: 23,415; Referee: Jarred Gillett

6 December 2015 9	Adelaide United	1–0	Perth Glory	Adelaide
19:00 ACDT	Sánchez 3'	Report		Stadium: Coopers Stadium; Attendance: 6,205; Referee: Stephen Lucas

11 December 2015 10	Adelaide United	2–1	Sydney FC	Adelaide
19:30 ACDT	Jeggo 62'; Carrusca 90+4' (pen.)	Report	Hološko 70'	Stadium: Coopers Stadium; Attendance: 9,076; Referee: Strebre Delovski

18 December 2015 11	Newcastle Jets	0–0	Adelaide United	Newcastle
19:40 AEDT		Report		Stadium: Hunter Stadium; Attendance: 7,332; Referee: Kris Griffiths-Jones

26 December 2015 12	Adelaide United	3–0	Wellington Phoenix	Adelaide
16:45 ACDT	Muscat 42' (o.g.); Goodwin 73'; Marrone 75'	Report		Stadium: Coopers Stadium; Attendance: 11,655; Referee: Chris Beath

1 January 2016 13	Western Sydney Wanderers	0–0	Adelaide United	Parramatta
19:40 AEDT		Report		Stadium: Pirtek Stadium; Attendance: 16,312; Referee: Ben Williams

9 January 2016 14	Perth Glory	1–3	Adelaide United	Perth
18:40 AWST	Elrich 6' (o.g.)	Report	Cirio 27'; Carrusca 47'; Goodwin 90+4'	Stadium: nib Stadium; Attendance: 9,009; Referee: Strebre Delovski

16 January 2016 15	Adelaide United	3–1	Central Coast Mariners	Adelaide
16:45 ACDT	Goodwin 60'; Sánchez 80'; Dugandzic 90+2'	Report	F. Ferreria 67'	Stadium: Coopers Stadium; Attendance: 11,125; Referee: Matthew Conger

22 January 2016 16	Brisbane Roar	1–4	Adelaide United	Brisbane
19:00 AEST	Henrique 50' (pen.)	Report	C. Brown 19' (o.g.); Djite 56' (pen.), 67'; Carrusca 90+2'	Stadium: Suncorp Stadium; Attendance: 12,923; Referee: Jarred Gillett

31 January 2016 17	Adelaide United	1–0	Newcastle Jets	Adelaide
16:30 ACDT	Carrusca 43'	Report		Stadium: Coopers Stadium; Attendance: 12,434; Referee: Ben Williams

5 February 2016 18	Adelaide United	2–2	Sydney FC	Adelaide
19:10 ACDT	Cirio 2', 45'	Report	Simon 37'; Hološko 45+3'	Stadium: Coopers Stadium; Attendance: 11,785; Referee: Chris Beath

14 February 2016 19	Central Coast Mariners	2–3	Adelaide United	Gosford
19:00 AEDT	F. Ferreira 32'; Bingham 90+4'	Report	Isaías 54'; Djite 66'; Mauk 90+2'	Stadium: Central Coast Stadium; Attendance: 5,096; Referee: Jarred Gillett

19 February 2016 20	Melbourne Victory	0–1	Adelaide United	Melbourne
19:40 AEDT		Report	Kamau 90'	Stadium: AAMI Park; Attendance: 18,924; Referee: Ben Williams

27 February 2016 21	Adelaide United	3–0	Brisbane Roar	Adelaide
16:45 ACDT	Kamau 38'; Djite 50'; Sánchez 81'	Report		Stadium: Coopers Stadium; Attendance: 12,712; Referee: Shaun Evans

5 March 2016 22	Wellington Phoenix	0–4	Adelaide United	Wellington
19:15 NZDT		Report	McGowan 31'; Mauk 41'; Djite 49'; Sánchez 90'	Stadium: Westpac Stadium; Attendance: 6,595; Referee: Peter Green

11 March 2016 23	Adelaide United	0–1	Melbourne City	Adelaide
19:30 ACDT		Report	Fitzgerald 71'	Stadium: Coopers Stadium; Attendance: 14,274; Referee: Chris Beath

19 March 2016 24	Western Sydney Wanderers	0–0	Adelaide United	Parramatta
19:30 AEDT		Report		Stadium: Pirtek Stadium; Attendance: 15,208; Referee: Takuto Okabe (Japan)

27 March 2016 25	Adelaide United	4–2	Central Coast Mariners	Adelaide
16:30 ACDT	Isaías 29'; Mauk 35'; Djite 38'; Sánchez 81' (pen.)	Report	O'Donovan 16', 83'	Stadium: Coopers Stadium; Attendance: 10,269; Referee: Stephen Lucas

2 April 2016 26	Sydney FC	0–2	Adelaide United	Sydney
19:30 AEDT		Report	Djite 26', 45'	Stadium: Sydney Football Stadium; Attendance: 8,981; Referee: Peter Green

8 April 2016 27	Melbourne City	0–2	Adelaide United	Melbourne
19:40 AEST		Report	Isaías 4'; Djite 45+2' (pen.)	Stadium: AAMI Park; Attendance: 11,454; Referee: Strebre Delovski

==== Finals series ====
22 April 2016 Semi-finals	Adelaide United	4–1	Melbourne City	Adelaide
19:15 ACST	Djite 48', 60' (pen.); McGowan 88'; Sánchez 90+4'	Report	Fitzgerald 72'	Stadium: Coopers Stadium; Attendance: 15,489; Referee: Strebre Delovski

1 May 2016 Grand Final	Adelaide United	3–1	Western Sydney Wanderers	Adelaide
15:30 ACST	Kamau 21'; Isaías 32'; Sánchez 89'	Report	Neville 58'	Stadium: Adelaide Oval; Attendance: 50,119; Referee: Jarred Gillett

=== FFA Cup ===
5 August 2015 Round of 32	Darwin Olympic	1–6	Adelaide United	Darwin
20:00 ACST	Tsounias 19'	Report	Carrusca 18' (pen.); Jeggo 40', 41'; Cirio 78'; Babalj 80'; Sánchez 82'	Stadium: Darwin Football Stadium; Attendance: 3,175; Referee: Lucien Laverdure

26 August 2015 Round of 16	Adelaide United	2–1 (a.e.t.)	Sydney FC	Adelaide
19:00 ACST	Sánchez 41'; McGowan 114'	Report	Grant 16'	Stadium: Coopers Stadium; Attendance: 5,066; Referee: Shaun Evans

22 September 2015 Quarter-finals	Melbourne Victory	3–1	Adelaide United	Melbourne
19:30 AEST	Finkler 10'; Barbarouses 45+1'; Berisha 82' (pen.)	Report	Carrusca 78' (pen.)	Stadium: AAMI Park; Attendance: 10,521; Referee: Peter Green

=== AFC Champions League ===
==== Qualifying play-off ====
9 February 2016 Play-off round	Adelaide United (Australia)	1–2	(China) Shandong Luneng Taishan	Adelaide
19:30 ACDT	Cirio 89'	Report (FFA); Report (AFC)	Yang 17'; Tardelli 39'; Wang (yellow card) 2' (yellow-red card) 69'	Stadium: Hindmarsh Stadium; Attendance: 8,487; Referee: Minoru Tōjō (Japan)

== Statistics ==
=== Appearances and goals ===
No.	Pos	Nat	Player	Total		A-League		A-League Finals		FFA Cup		Champions League	
No.	Pos	Nat	Player	Apps	Goals	Apps	Goals	Apps	Goals	Apps	Goals	Apps	Goals
1	GK	(Australia) AUS	Eugene Galekovic	26	0	20	0	2	0	3	0	1	0
2	DF	(Australia) AUS	Michael Marrone	30	1	23+1	1	2	0	2+1	0	1	0
3	DF	(Italy) ITA	Iacopo La Rocca	15	0	10+1	0	2	0	1+1	0	0	0
4	DF	(Australia) AUS	Dylan McGowan	32	3	27	1	2	1	2	1	1	0
6	MF	(Australia) AUS	Stefan Mauk	14	3	9+2	3	2	0	0	0	1	0
7	MF	(Spain) ESP	Pablo Sánchez	27	11	8+15	7	0+2	2	1+1	2	0	0
8	MF	(Spain) ESP	Isaías	31	5	24+1	4	2	1	3	0	1	0
9	FW	(Spain) ESP	Sergio Cirio	31	5	24+1	4	2	0	3	0	1	1
10	MF	(Argentina) ARG	Marcelo Carrusca	32	7	22+4	5	2	0	3	2	1	0
11	FW	(Australia) AUS	Bruce Djite	29	11	20+4	9	2	2	2	0	1	0
12	MF	(Australia) AUS	Mark Ochieng	1	0	0+1	0	0	0	0	0	0	0
14	MF	(Australia) AUS	George Mells	25	0	11+14	0	0	0	0	0	0	0
15	DF	(Australia) AUS	Ben Warland	1	0	0+1	0	0	0	0	0	0	0
16	DF	(Australia) AUS	Craig Goodwin	30	4	24	4	2	0	3	0	1	0
17	FW	(Australia) AUS	Mate Dugandzic	21	1	4+14	1	0	0	1+1	0	0+1	0
19	FW	(Australia) AUS	Eli Babalj	8	0	2+3	0	0	0	0+3	0	0	0
20	GK	(Australia) AUS	John Hall	6	0	6	0	0	0	0	0	0	0
21	DF	(Australia) AUS	Tarek Elrich	26	0	20	0	0+2	0	3	0	1	0
23	DF	(Australia) AUS	Jordan Elsey	18	0	14+2	0	0+1	0	0	0	1	0
24	FW	(Australia) AUS	Bruce Kamau	19	3	7+9	2	2	1	0	0	0+1	0
28	MF	(Australia) AUS	Antoni Trimboli	2	0	0+2	0	0	0	0	0	0	0
29	MF	(Australia) AUS	Riley McGree	1	0	0+1	0	0	0	0	0	0	0
30	GK	(Australia) AUS	Daniel Margush	1	0	1	0	0	0	0	0	0	0
Player(s) transferred out but featured this season
5	MF	(Australia) AUS	Osama Malik	10	0	7	0	0	0	3	0	0	0
18	MF	(Australia) AUS	James Jeggo	18	2	15	0	0	0	3	2	0	0
18	FW	(Indonesia) IDN	Sergio van Dijk	1	0	0	0	0	0	0	0	0+1	0

- Source: Soccerway

== See also ==
- 2015–16 Adelaide United FC (W-League) season
