= 2014–15 Adelaide United FC season =

Adelaide United
2014–15 season
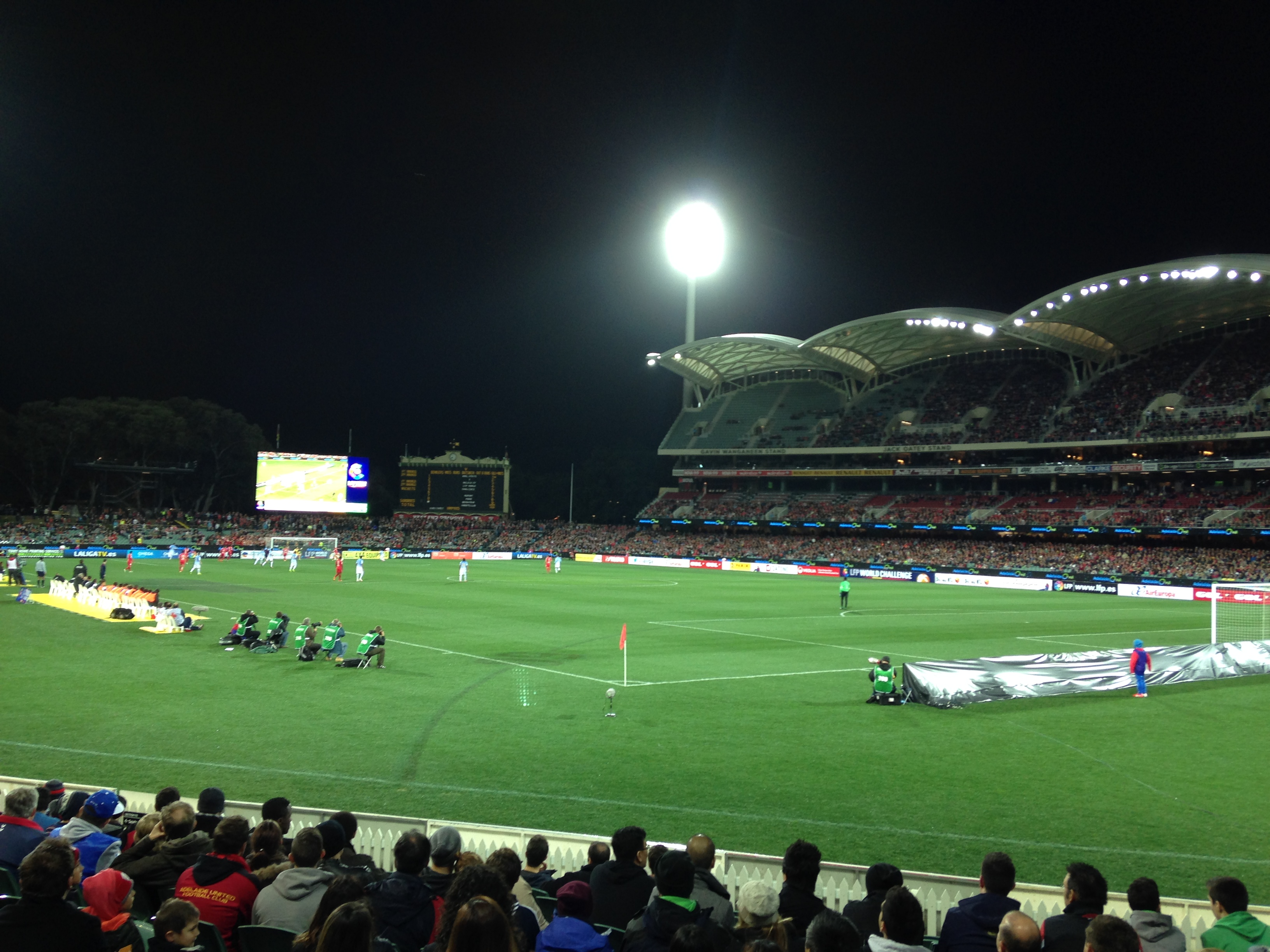
- Adelaide United playing against Málaga during pre-season
- Chairman: Greg Griffin
- Head Coach: Josep Gombau
- Stadium: Coopers Stadium
- A-League: 3rd
- A-League Finals: Semi-finals
- FFA Cup: Winners
- Top goalscorer: League: Pablo Sánchez (8); All: Sergio Cirio (13)
- Highest home attendance: 33,126 vs. Melbourne Victory (17 October 2014); A-League
- Lowest home attendance: 2,804 vs. Wellington Phoenix (5 August 2014); FFA Cup
- Average home league attendance: 12,637
- Biggest win: 7–0 vs. Newcastle Jets (H) (24 January 2015); A-League
- Biggest defeat: 1–4 vs. Sydney FC (A) (9 May 2015); A-League Finals
Home colours	Away colours

The 2014–15 Adelaide United FC season was the club's 11th season since its establishment in 2003. The club participated in the A-League for the 10th time and the FFA Cup for the first time.

== Players ==
=== Squad information ===
Note: Flags indicate national team as defined under FIFA eligibility rules; some limited exceptions apply. Players may hold more than one non-FIFA nationality.

No.	Pos.	Nation	Player
1	GK	AUS	Eugene Galekovic (captain)
2	DF	AUS	Michael Marrone
3	DF	AUS	Nigel Boogaard
4	DF	AUS	Dylan McGowan
5	MF	AUS	Osama Malik
7	FW	ESP	Pablo Sánchez
8	MF	ESP	Isaías
9	FW	ESP	Sergio Cirio
10	MF	ARG	Marcelo Carrusca
11	FW	AUS	Bruce Djite
12	MF	AUS	Mark Ochieng
13	FW	AUS	Dylan Smith

No.	Pos.	Nation	Player
14	MF	AUS	Cameron Watson
15	DF	AUS	Ben Warland
16	DF	AUS	Craig Goodwin
17	FW	AUS	Awer Mabil
18	MF	AUS	James Jeggo
19	FW	ESP	Miguel Palanca
20	GK	AUS	Paul Izzo
21	DF	AUS	Tarek Elrich
23	DF	AUS	Jordan Elsey
24	MF	AUS	Bruce Kamau
30	GK	AUS	John Hall
32	MF	AUS	Nathan Konstandopoulos

=== From youth squad ===
N	Pos.	Nat.	Name	Age	Notes

=== Transfers in ===
No.	Pos.	Nat.	Name	Age	Moving from	Type	Transfer window	Ends	Transfer fee	Source
7	FW	(Spain)	Pablo Sánchez	31	CD Lugo (Spain)	Transfer	Pre-season	2015	Free	
18	MF	(Australia)	James Jeggo	22	Melbourne Victory	Transfer	Pre-season	2016	Free	
4	DF	(Australia)	Dylan McGowan	22	Heart of Midlothian (Scotland)	Transfer	Pre-season	2016	Free	
16	DF	(Australia)	Craig Goodwin	22	Newcastle Jets	Transfer	Pre-season		Free	
19	FW	(Spain)	Miguel Palanca	27	CD Numancia (Spain)	Transfer	January	2015	Free	

=== Transfers out ===
No.	Pos.	Nat.	Name	Age	Moving to	Type	Transfer window	Transfer fee	Source
15	CM	(Australia)	Jacob Melling	19	Melbourne City	Contract terminated	Pre-season	Free	
19	AM	(Australia)	Jake Barker-Daish	20	Colne (England)	End of contract	Pre-season	Free	
16	RWB	(Australia)	Daniel Bowles	22	Brisbane Roar	End of contract	Pre-season	Free	
7	WI	(Argentina)	Jerónimo Neumann	28	Newcastle Jets	Transfer	Pre-season	Free	
4	CB	(Australia)	Jonathan McKain	31	Kelantan (Malaysia)	End of contract	Pre-season	Free	
18	LB	(Australia)	Michael Zullo	25	Utrecht (Netherlands)	End of loan	Pre-season		
6	LB	(Brazil)	Cássio	34		Contract terminated	January		
22	WI	(Portugal)	Fábio Ferreira	25	Central Coast Mariners	Transfer	January	Free	

== Technical staff ==
Position	Staff
Head coach	(Spain) Josep Gombau
Assistant & Fitness coach	(Spain) Pau Martí
Assistant coach	(Australia) Michael Valkanis
Technical Director	(Spain) Guillermo Amor
High Performance Manager	(Australia) Adam Hewitt
Goalkeeper coach	(Australia) Peter Blazincic
Youth team coach	(Australia) Angelo Costanzo
Physiotherapist	(Australia) Peter Chitti

== Statistics ==
=== Squad statistics ===
N	Pos.	Nat.	Name	Total					A-League					FFA Cup
N	Pos.	Nat.	Name	Apps	Goals	Yellow card	Second yellow card	Red card	Apps	Goals	Yellow card	Second yellow card	Red card	Apps	Goals	Yellow card	Second yellow card	Red card
1	GK	(Australia)	Eugene Galekovic	30	0	1	0	0	26	0	0	0	0	4	0	1	0	0
2	DF	(Australia)	Michael Marrone	27	0	5	0	1	18+6	0	5	0	1	2+1	0	0	0	0
3	DF	(Australia)	Nigel Boogaard	27	2	8	0	1	21+1	2	7	0	1	5	0	1	0	0
4	DF	(Australia)	Dylan McGowan	31	1	5	0	0	20+6	1	5	0	0	4+1	0	0	0	0
5	MF	(Australia)	Osama Malik	21	0	6	0	0	16+2	0	5	0	0	2+1	0	1	0	0
6	DF	(Brazil)	Cássio	0	0	0	0	0	0	0	0	0	0	0	0	0	0	0
7	FW	(Spain)	Pablo Sánchez	30	8	1	0	0	17+9	8	1	0	0	3+1	0	0	0	0
8	MF	(Spain)	Isaías	32	1	9	0	0	27	1	8	0	0	5	0	1	0	0
9	FW	(Spain)	Sergio Cirio	34	13	2	0	0	29	7	2	0	0	5	6	0	0	0
10	MF	(Argentina)	Marcelo Carrusca	25	7	4	0	0	21	7	4	0	0	4	0	0	0	0
11	FW	(Australia)	Bruce Djite	27	9	1	0	0	22+1	6	0	0	0	4	3	1	0	0
12	DF	(Australia)	Mark Ochieng	2	0	0	0	0	0	0	0	0	0	0+2	0	0	0	0
13	FW	(Australia)	Dylan Smith	1	0	0	0	0	0+1	0	0	0	0	0	0	0	0	0
14	MF	(Australia)	Cameron Watson	12	1	2	0	0	2+9	1	2	0	0	0+1	0	0	0	0
15	DF	(Australia)	Ben Warland	1	0	0	0	0	0+1	0	0	0	0	0	0	0	0	0
16	DF	(Australia)	Craig Goodwin	29	6	3	0	0	25+4	6	3	0	0	0	0	0	0	0
17	FW	(Australia)	Awer Mabil	26	7	5	0	0	7+14	6	4	0	0	5	1	1	0	0
18	MF	(Australia)	James Jeggo	33	1	9	0	0	27+1	1	7	0	0	5	0	2	0	0
19	FW	(Spain)	Miguel Palanca	14	1	1	0	0	5+9	1	1	0	0	0	0	0	0	0
20	GK	(Australia)	Paul Izzo	4	0	0	0	0	3	0	0	0	0	1	0	0	0	0
21	DF	(Australia)	Tarek Elrich	31	1	10	0	0	26	1	9	0	0	5	0	1	0	0
22	MF	(Portugal)	Fábio Ferreira	11	1	1	0	0	5+3	1	0	0	0	0+3	0	1	0	0
23	DF	(Australia)	Jordan Elsey	1	0	0	0	0	0	0	0	0	0	0+1	0	0	0	0
24	MF	(Australia)	Bruce Kamau	13	0	0	0	0	2+9	0	0	0	0	1+1	0	0	0	0
25	MF	(Australia)	Ryan Kitto	0	0	0	0	0	0	0	0	0	0	0	0	0	0	0
30	GK	(Australia)	John Hall	1	0	0	0	0	0+1	0	0	0	0	0	0	0	0	0
32	MF	(Australia)	Nathan Konstandopoulos	3	0	0	0	0	0	0	0	0	0	0+3	0	0	0	0

- Last updated: 9 May 2015
- Source: au.soccerway.com
- (yellow card) = Number of bookings; (second yellow card) = Number of sending offs after a second yellow card; (red card) = Number of sending offs by a direct red card.

== Pre-season and friendlies ==
20 July 2014	Adelaide United (Australia)	1–0	(Australia) Perth Glory	Sydney, Australia
16:00 (ACST)	Boogaard 72'	Report		Stadium: Belmore Sports Ground

25 July 2014	Adelaide United (Australia)	1–5	(Spain) Málaga	Adelaide, Australia
19:00 (ACST)	Djite 58'	Report	Malik 17' (o.g.); Pérez 49'; Alberto 52'; Juanmi 62', 86'	Stadium: Adelaide Oval; Attendance: 23,254; Referee: Jarred Gillett

21 August 2014	Alice Springs All Stars (Australia)	0–10	(Australia) Adelaide United	Alice Springs, Australia
19:30 (ACST)		Report	Kamau 8', 75'; Djite 24'; Mabil 31'; Jeggo 47'; Cirio 51'; Elsey 78'; Ochieng 85'; Sánchez 88'; D. Smith 90+1'	Stadium: Anzac Oval; Attendance: 600

23 August 2014	Adelaide United (Australia)	1–0	(Australia) Melbourne City	Alice Springs, Australia
15:00 (ACST)	Cirio 3'	Report		Stadium: Anzac Oval; Attendance: 1,550; Referee: Lucien Laverdure

26 August 2014	NorZone All Stars (Australia)	0–6	(Australia) Adelaide United	Darwin, Australia
19:00 (ACST)		Report	Carrusca 23' (pen.); Djite 48', 70'; Jeggo 58'; Ochieng 80'; D. Smith 90+2'	Stadium: Darwin Football Stadium; Attendance: 1,887; Referee: Rick Schneider

4 September 2014	Adelaide United (Australia)	1–1	(Australia) Perth Glory	Adelaide, Australia
15:00 (ACST)	Cirio 32'	Report	Thwaite 38'	Stadium: Coopers Stadium; Attendance: 0 (Behind closed doors); Referee: Rick Schneider

12 September 2014	Adelaide United (Australia)	0–1	(Australia) Melbourne Victory	Adelaide, Australia
15:00 (ACST)		Report	Berisha 34' (pen.)	Stadium: Coopers Stadium; Attendance: 0 (Behind closed doors); Referee: Adam Fielding

16 September 2014	Adelaide United (Australia)	2–0	(Australia) Melbourne City	Adelaide, Australia
15:00 (ACST)	Mabil 33'; Goodwin 45'	Report		Stadium: Coopers Stadium; Attendance: 0 (Behind closed doors); Referee: Daniel Goodwin

1 October 2014	Adelaide United (Australia)	1–1	(Australia) Adelaide City	Adelaide, Australia
19:00 (ACST)	Carrusca 8'	Report	Love 68'	Stadium: Marden Sports Complex; Attendance: 2,174; Referee: Daniel Elder

29 May 2015 2015 LFP World Club Challenge	Adelaide United (Australia)	2–3	(Spain) Villarreal	Adelaide, Australia
19:30 (ACST)	Goodwin 34'; Marrone 51'	Report	Trigueros 63'; Vietto 86'; Gerard 90+1'	Stadium: Coopers Stadium; Attendance: 9,036; Referee: Peter Green

== Competitions ==
=== Overall ===
Competition	Started round	Final position / round	First match	Last match
A-League	—	3rd	12 October 2014	25 April 2015
A-League Finals	Elimination-finals	Semi-finals	1 May 2015	17 May 2015
FFA Cup	Round of 32	Winners	5 August 2014	16 December 2014

=== A-League ===
==== League table ====
Pos	Team	Pld	W	D	L	GF	GA	GD	Pts	Qualification
1	Melbourne Victory (C)	27	15	8	4	56	31	+25	53	Qualification for 2016 AFC Champions League group stage and Finals series
2	Sydney FC	27	14	8	5	52	35	+17	50	Qualification for 2016 AFC Champions League group stage and Finals series
3	Adelaide United	27	14	4	9	47	32	+15	46	Qualification for 2016 AFC Champions League qualifying play-off and Finals series
4	Wellington Phoenix (Note: Wellington Phoenix cannot qualify for the AFC Champions League as they are not recognised as an AFC club.)	27	14	4	9	45	35	+10	46	Qualification for Finals series
5	Melbourne City	27	9	8	10	36	41	−5	35	Qualification for Finals series
6	Brisbane Roar	27	10	4	13	42	43	−1	34	Qualification for Finals series
7	Perth Glory (Note: Perth Glory disqualified from the Finals series and given a compulsory 7th-place finish due to salary cap violations.)	27	14	8	5	45	35	+10	50	
8	Central Coast Mariners	27	5	8	14	26	50	−24	23	
9	Western Sydney Wanderers	27	4	6	17	29	44	−15	18	
10	Newcastle Jets	27	3	8	16	23	55	−32	17	

Source: A-League
Rules for classification: 1) points; 2) goal difference; 3) number of goals scored.
(C) Champions

==== Results summary ====
Overall								Home						Away					
Pld	W	D	L	GF	GA	GD	Pts	W	D	L	GF	GA	GD	W	D	L	GF	GA	GD
27	14	4	9	47	32	+15	46	7	4	3	28	15	+13	7	0	6	19	17	+2

Last updated: 25 April 2015.
Source: ultimatealeague.com

==== Results by round ====
Round	1	2	3	4	5	6	7	8	9	10	11	12	13	14	15	16	17	18	19	20	21	22	23	24	25	26	27
Ground	A	H	H	A	H	H	A	A	H	H	A	A	H	A	H	A	H	H	A	A	H	H	A	A	H	A	H
Result	W	D	W	W	D	W	W	L	W	L	L	W	L	W	W	L	D	W	L	L	W	D	W	W	L	L	W
Position	2	4	3	3	4	2	2	3	3	3	3	2	4	4	2	3	3	3	3	5	5	5	5	3	4	5	3

Updated to match(es) played on 26 April 2015. Source: ultimatealeague.com
A = Away; H = Home; W = Win; D = Draw; L = Loss

==== Matches ====
12 October 2014 1	Brisbane Roar	1–2	Adelaide United	Brisbane
Sunday 16:00 AEST	Broich 20'; McKay (yellow card) 71' (red card) 72'	Report	Djite 33'; Donachie 56' (o.g.)	Stadium: Suncorp Stadium; Attendance: 16,195; Referee: Ben Williams

17 October 2014 2	Adelaide United	1–1	Melbourne Victory	Adelaide
Friday 19:00 ACDT	Cirio 85'	Report	Ben Khalfallah 89'	Stadium: Adelaide Oval; Attendance: 33,126; Referee: Peter O'Leary

26 October 2014 3	Adelaide United	2–0	Perth Glory	Adelaide
Sunday 16:30 ACDT	Cirio 18'; Mabil 68'	Report		Stadium: Coopers Stadium; Attendance: 11,473; Referee: Kris Griffiths-Jones

31 October 2014 4	Melbourne City	1–2	Adelaide United	Melbourne
Friday 19:40 AEDT	Kisnorbo 9'	Report	Djite 38'; Carrusca 80' (pen.)	Stadium: AAMI Park; Attendance: 13,083; Referee: Chris Beath

7 November 2014 5	Adelaide United	0–0	Sydney FC	Adelaide
Friday 19:45 ACDT		Report		Stadium: Coopers Stadium; Attendance: 16,015; Referee: Alan Milliner

15 November 2014 6	Adelaide United	2–1	Wellington Phoenix	Adelaide
Saturday 16:30 ACDT	Boogaard 36'; Cirio 90+4'	Report	Bonevacia 15'	Stadium: Coopers Stadium; Attendance: 9,726; Referee: Strebre Delovski

23 November 2014 7	Central Coast Mariners	0–2	Adelaide United	Gosford
Sunday 17:00 AEDT	Montgomery (yellow card) 44' (red card) 71'	Report	Sánchez 40', 42'	Stadium: Central Coast Stadium; Attendance: 6,404; Referee: Jarred Gillett

28 November 2014 8	Melbourne Victory	3–2	Adelaide United	Melbourne
Friday 19:40 AEDT	Boogaard 7' (o.g.); Cirio 16' (o.g.); Broxham 32'	Report	Mabil 14'; Carrusca 37' (pen.)	Stadium: AAMI Park; Attendance: 22,334; Referee: Kris Griffiths-Jones

6 December 2014 9	Adelaide United	2–0	Western Sydney Wanderers	Adelaide
Saturday 19:30 ACDT	Carrusca 36'; F. Ferreira 55'	Report	Topor-Stanley (yellow card) 15' (yellow-red card)	Stadium: Coopers Stadium; Attendance: 12,122; Referee: Jarred Gillett

12 December 2014 10	Adelaide United	0–1	Brisbane Roar	Adelaide
Friday 19:00 ACDT		Report	Henrique 18'	Stadium: Coopers Stadium; Attendance: 11,241; Referee: Lucien Laverdue

19 December 2014 11	Newcastle Jets	2–1	Adelaide United	Newcastle
Friday 19:40 AEDT	Neville 49'; Jerónimo 81'	Report	Goodwin 69'	Stadium: Hunter Stadium; Attendance: 10,407; Referee: Strebre Delovski

26 December 2014 12	Sydney FC	0–3	Adelaide United	Sydney
Friday 19:40 AEDT		Report	Dijte 67'; Sánchez 81'; Mabil 90+1'	Stadium: Allianz Stadium; Attendance: 14,214; Referee: Jarred Gillett

31 December 2014 13	Adelaide United	1–3	Wellington Phoenix	Adelaide
Wednesday 19:00 ACDT	Cirio 73'	Report	Cunningham 54'; Boyd 77', 90+3'	Stadium: Coopers Stadium; Attendance: 10,060; Referee: Kris Griffiths-Jones

5 January 2015 14	Perth Glory	1–2	Adelaide United	Perth
Monday 17:00 AWST	Marinković 11'	Report	Goodwin 31'; Jeggo 48'	Stadium: nib Stadium; Attendance: 9,699; Referee: Strebre Delovski

24 January 2015 15	Adelaide United	7–0	Newcastle Jets	Adelaide
Saturday 16:30 ACDT	Dijte 2', 53'; Carrusca 23', 28' (pen.); Boogaard 35'; Cirio 69' (pen.); Isaías 90+2'	Report		Stadium: Coopers Stadium; Attendance: 10,960; Referee: Matthew Conger

7 February 2015 16	Central Coast Mariners	2–1	Adelaide United	Gosford
Saturday 17:00 AEDT	Fitzgerald 79'; J. Rose 83'	Report	Mabil 29'	Stadium: Central Coast Stadium; Attendance: 4,508; Referee: Alan Milliner

15 February 2015 17	Adelaide United	1–1	Perth Glory	Adelaide
Sunday 16:30 ACDT	Sánchez 11'	Report	Marinković 53'	Stadium: Coopers Stadium; Attendance: 9,711; Referee: Ben Williams

21 February 2015 18	Adelaide United	2–1	Western Sydney Wanderers	Adelaide
Saturday 19:30 ACDT	Dijte 51'; Cirio 90+2'	Report	Haliti 19'; Spiranovic (yellow card) 54' (yellow-red card) 83'	Stadium: Coopers Stadium; Attendance: 9,212; Referee: Peter O'Leary

27 February 2015 19	Melbourne City	3–1	Adelaide United	Melbourne
Friday 19:40 AEDT	Baharudin 52'; Kennedy 55'; Ramsay 87'	Report	Sánchez 32'	Stadium: AAMI Park; Attendance: 7,345; Referee: Alan Milliner

7 March 2015 20	Wellington Phoenix	2–0	Adelaide United	Lower Hutt
Saturday 17:00 NZDT	J. Griffiths 79'; Burns 82'	Report		Stadium: Hutt Recreation Ground; Attendance: 7,819; Referee: Ben Williams

12 March 2015 21	Adelaide United	2–1	Central Coast Mariners	Adelaide
Thursday 19:00 ACDT	Carrusca 24'; Goodwin 67'	Report	Cáceres 23'	Stadium: Coopers Stadium; Attendance: 7,767; Referee: Yudai Yamamoto (Japan)

21 March 2015 22	Adelaide United	2–2	Melbourne Victory	Adelaide
Saturday 19:30 ACDT	Sánchez 43'; McGowan 75'	Report	Ben Khalfallah 9'; Thompson 77'	Stadium: Coopers Stadium; Attendance: 16,077; Referee: Peter Green

29 March 2015 23	Newcastle Jets	0–1	Adelaide United	Newcastle
Sunday 17:00 AEDT		Report	Carrusca 28'	Stadium: Hunter Stadium; Attendance: 6,888; Referee: Kazuyoshi Enomoto (Japan)

4 April 2015 24	Sydney FC	0–1	Adelaide United	Sydney
Saturday 19:30 AEDT		Report	Mabil 82'	Stadium: Allianz Stadium; Attendance: 11,585; Referee: Chris Beath

11 April 2015 25	Adelaide United	2–3	Brisbane Roar	Adelaide
Saturday 16:30 ACST	Goodwin 71'; Sánchez 90+4' (pen.)	Report	Kaluđerović 26'; Galekovic 40' (o.g.); Hingert 54'; Bowles (red card) 90+4'	Stadium: Coopers Stadium; Attendance: 10,659; Referee: Strebre Delovski

18 April 2015 26	Western Sydney Wanderers	2–1	Adelaide United	Parramatta
Saturday 17:00 AEST	Juric 63' (pen.); Bridge 73'	Report	Cirio 45'; Boogaard (red card) 62'	Stadium: Pirtek Stadium; Attendance: 9,837; Referee: Jarred Gillett

25 April 2015 27	Adelaide United	4–1	Melbourne City	Adelaide
Saturday 19:00 ACST	Palanca 19'; Sánchez 23'; Elrich 33'; Watson 59' (pen.); Marrone (red card) 70'	Report	Mooy 65' (pen.); Jaliens (red card) 66'	Stadium: Coopers Stadium; Attendance: 8,773; Referee: Kris Griffiths-Jones

==== Finals series ====
1 May 2015 Elimination-finals	Adelaide United	2–1	Brisbane Roar	Adelaide
Friday 19:00 ACST	Goodwin 7'; Mabil 87'	Report	Broich 27'	Stadium: Adelaide Oval; Attendance: 20,155; Referee: Peter Green

9 May 2015 Semi-finals	Sydney FC	4–1	Adelaide United	Sydney
19:30 AEST	Ibini 19'; Brosque 45+1', 47'; Naumoff 90'	Report	Goodwin 74'	Stadium: Allianz Stadium; Attendance: 26,783; Referee: Ben Williams

=== FFA Cup ===
5 August 2014 Round of 32	Adelaide United	1–0	Wellington Phoenix	Adelaide
19:30 ACST	Cirio 31'	Report		Stadium: Marden Sports Complex; Attendance: 2,804; Referee: Shaun Evans

23 September 2014 Round of 16	Adelaide United	2–0	Brisbane Roar	Adelaide
19:00 ACST	Djite 35'; Cirio 47'	Report		Stadium: Coopers Stadium; Attendance: 4,053; Referee: Shaun Evans

21 October 2014 Quarter final	Sydney FC	1–3 (a.e.t.)	Adelaide United	Sydney
19:30 AEDT	Brosque 51'; Petković (red card) 87'	Report	Cirio 28'; Djite 99', 111'	Stadium: Allianz Stadium; Attendance: 3,536; Referee: Ben Williams

12 November 2014 Semi-final	Adelaide United	3–2	Central Coast Mariners	Adelaide
19:00 ACDT	Cirio 40', 88'; Mabil 44'	Report	Simon 48'; Rose 93'	Stadium: Coopers Stadium; Attendance: 4,548; Referee: Chris Beath

16 December 2014 Final	Adelaide United	1–0	Perth Glory	Adelaide
19:00 ACDT	Cirio 67'	Report	Risdon (yellow card) 42' (yellow-red card) 58'	Stadium: Coopers Stadium; Attendance: 16,142; Referee: Chris Beath

== Awards ==
- NAB Young Footballer of the Month (December) – James Jeggo
