= 2016 A-League Grand Final =

- Event: 2015–16 A-League
Adelaide United	Western Sydney Wanderers
3	1
- Date: 1 May 2016
- Venue: Adelaide Oval, Adelaide
- Man of the Match: Isaías
- Referee: Jarred Gillett
- Attendance: 50,119
- Weather: Partly cloudy 18 °C (64 °F)

The 2016 A-League Grand Final was the eleventh A-League Grand Final, and was played on 1 May 2016, at Adelaide Oval to determine the 2015–16 A-League Champion. The match was contested by the two winning finals series semi-finalists, Adelaide United and Western Sydney Wanderers who finished the 2015–16 A-League season in first and second position respectively.

The match was won by Adelaide United, who defeated Western Sydney Wanderers 3–1 in front of a crowd of 50,119.

The Grand Final was both teams' third, with both never having won. Adelaide losing the 2007 and 2009 grand finals against Melbourne Victory 6–0 and 1–0 respectively. Wanderers lost consecutive grand finals in 2013 and 2014, against Central Coast Mariners 2–0 and Brisbane Roar 2–1 in extra time.

As Grand Final winners, Adelaide United earned a spot in the group stage of the 2017 AFC Champions League, but had already qualified for the Asian competition prior to the match via their league position.

== Teams ==
In the following table, finals until 2004 were in the National Soccer League era, since 2006 were in the A-League era.

Team	Previous final appearances (bold indicates winners)
Adelaide United	2 (2007, 2009)
Western Sydney Wanderers	2 (2013, 2014)

== Route to the final ==
Pos	Team	Pts
1	Adelaide United	49
2	Western Sydney Wanderers	48
3	Brisbane Roar	48
4	Melbourne City	44
5	Perth Glory	43
6	Melbourne Victory	41

After the completion of the 2015–16 A-League regular season, the top six teams qualified for the finals series. Teams finishing 3rd-6th placed (Brisbane Roar, Melbourne City, Perth Glory and Melbourne Victory) began the series in the elimination-finals, with the top two teams (Adelaide United and Western Sydney Wanderers) receiving byes into the semi-finals.

The first match of the elimination-finals between Brisbane Roar and Melbourne Victory. The opening goal of the game came at the 86th minute, with Besart Berisha putting Melbourne in front. Brisbane immediately responded with a goal by Matt McKay in the 88th minute. In the third minute of added-time Thomas Broich netted in the match winner ensuring e progress to the semi-finals with a 2–1 win. The second elimination-final match between Melbourne City and Perth Glory was played in front of a crowd of 11,273 at AAMI Park. A brace from Bruno Fornaroli at either side of the break saw Melbourne progress to face Adelaide in the semi-finals.

The first match of the semi-finals was played at Hindmarsh Stadium in front of a sold-out crowd of 15,489. Adelaide took the lead at the 48th minute thanks to Bruce Djite, and the forward doubled the lead after converting a penalty in the 60th minute. Nick Fitzgerald's 72nd-minute goal gave the visitors some hope, but any chances of Melbourne City progressing were soon scrapped when Dylan McGowan scored in the 88th minute and Pablo Sánchez scored in the fourth minute of added-time to see the match finish 4–1. The win saw Adelaide through to their first A-League grand final in seven years.

In the second semi-final match Western Sydney Wanderers hosted Brisbane Roar at Parramatta Stadium in front of a sold-out crowd of 20,084. Brisbane started the game strongly by racing to a 3–0 lead inside 23 minutes via a Dimitri Petratos penalty, an Andreu Guerao own goal and a Jamie Maclaren strike. Wanderers replied with a goal in the 26th minute via Romeo Castelen, and Brendon Santalab scored in the 39th to bring the scores to 2–3. Castelen levelled the scores in 53rd minute and quickly put the home side in front with a 59th-minute goal. Another Maclaren goal within the last 10 minutes tied the scores to see the game go into extra-time. The deadlock broke in the 102nd minute with substitute Dario Vidosic netting in the decisive goal to send Wanderers to a third Grand Final in four years.

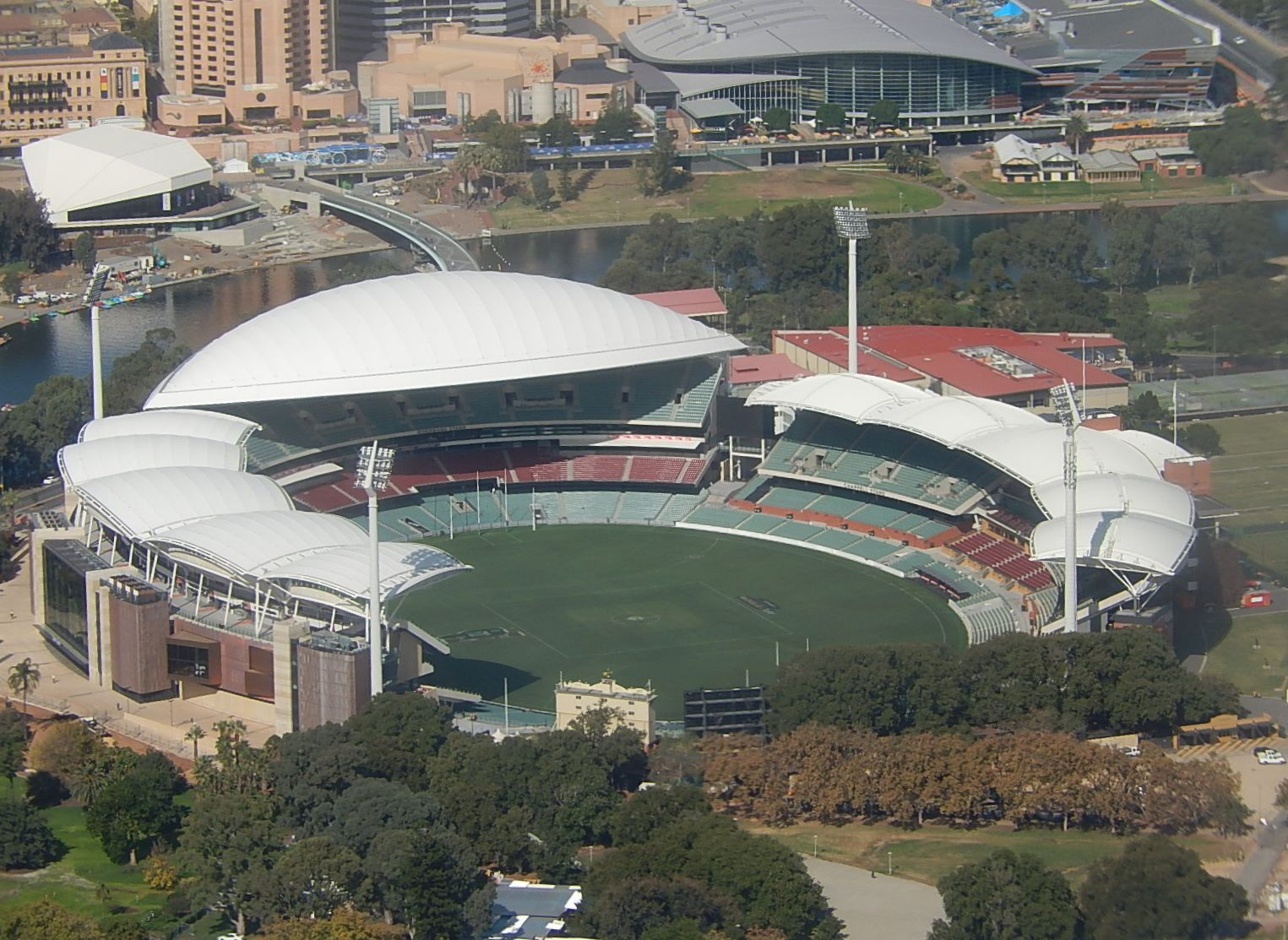
Adelaide Oval was chosen to host the 2016 A-League Grand Final

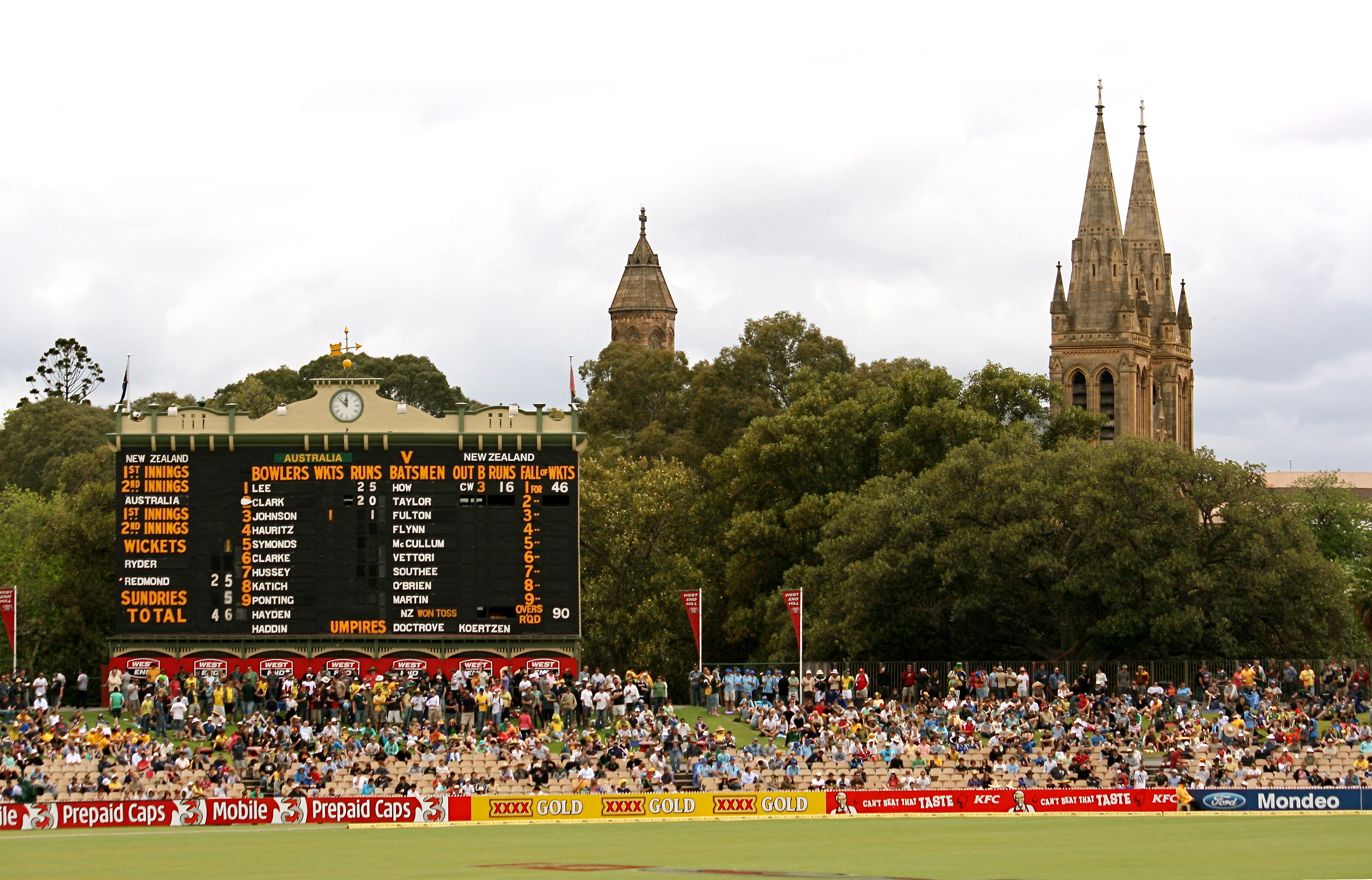
The Hill at Adelaide Oval was opened due to a high demand for tickets.

Elimination-finals
**Melbourne City**	**2**
Perth Glory	0
**Brisbane Roar**	**2**
Melbourne Victory	1

Semi-finals
**Adelaide United**	**4**
Melbourne City	1
**Western Sydney Wanderers** (a.e.t.)	**5**
Brisbane Roar	4

Grand Final
**Adelaide United**	**3**
Western Sydney Wanderers	1

== Pre-match ==
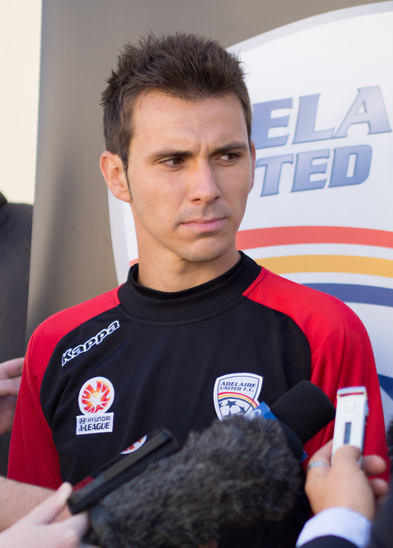
Grand Final man of the match, Isaías.

Adelaide Oval was confirmed to be the host venue of the 2016 A-League Grand Final following Adelaide United's semi-final win. The Oval was chosen as it has a capacity of 53,583, some 37,083 more than United's regular home Coopers Stadium, and had hosted a number of Adelaide United's high-profile A-League matches against Sydney FC and Melbourne Victory. Adelaide United have also played at the venue in friendly matches against Spanish side Málaga CF, in front of a crowd of 23,254, and Liverpool FC in front of 53,008 fans.

2015–16 Referee of the Year Jarred Gillett was named as the referee of the Grand Final. Gillett, a FIFA listed referee, previously took charge of the 2012 A-League Grand Final between Brisbane Roar and Perth Glory after being named the 2011–12 Referee of the Year, as well as the 2015 A-League Grand Final between Sydney FC and Melbourne Victory after being named the 2014–15 Referee of the Year. Gillett will be joined by Matthew Cream and Luke Brennan as the assistant referees, Paul Cetrangolo as the fourth official and Strebre Delovski and Chris Beath as additional assistant referees.

By 26 April, more than 43,000 tickets had been sold for the Grand Final match, with between 5,000 and 8,000 fans travelling from interstate, similar to the number of supporters that travelled north for the 2014 Grand Final in Brisbane. Owing to the high number of travelling Wanderers fans, extra flights from Sydney to Adelaide were arranged by various airlines. The increased demand saw some Qantas flights from Sydney to Adelaide almost tripling in price, with non-stop flights at $900 one-way. Virgin Australia had put on four extra flights, with the cheapest economy ticket from Sydney to Adelaide on the Saturday before the Grand Final costing $445 one-way. Tigerair Australia had also added an extra weekend flight, with tickets at $469 one-way.

Owing to the demand for tickets, FFA organised for The Hill at the Adelaide Oval to be opened for use. This added a further 1,500 tickets for the general public.

== Match ==
=== Summary ===
Bruce Kamau opened the scoring for Adelaide in the 22nd minute after finishing a cross from Marcelo Carrusca. Isaías doubled the lead for the home side 12 minutes later when he curled a free kick into the top corner past Wanderers keeper Andrew Redmayne.

Adelaide came close to adding a third early in the second half. Later, Scott Neville gave the visitors hope with a goal in the 58th minute, set up by Romeo Castelen and Brendon Šantalab. Adelaide thought they had restored a two-goal lead with just over 20 minutes to go, but when the ball was poked home from inside the box, it was ruled out for offside. Wanderers poured forward in search of an equaliser, but they could not find the necessary finish. As the game moved into the final minutes, Adelaide made sure of their title, as Pablo Sanchez burst into the penalty area and fired a shot across Redmayne into the corner of the net for 3–1.

Isaías was named man of the match, and as such was the recipient of the Joe Marston Medal.

=== Details ===
1 May 2016
15:30 ACST

Adelaide United	3–1	Western Sydney Wanderers
Kamau 21'; Isaías 32'; Sánchez 89'	Reports	Neville 58'

Adelaide Oval, Adelaide
Attendance: 50,119
Referee: Jarred Gillett

**Adelaide United**	**Western Sydney**; **Wanderers**

GK	1	(Australia) Eugene Galekovic
RB	2	(Australia) Michael Marrone	(substituted off) 73'
CB	4	(Australia) Dylan McGowan
CB	3	(Italy) Iacopo La Rocca
LB	16	(Australia) Craig Goodwin
DM	8	(Spain) Isaías
CM	10	(Argentina) Marcelo Carrusca	(substituted off) 86'
CM	6	(Australia) Stefan Mauk
RW	24	(Australia) Bruce Kamau	(substituted off) 90'
CF	11	(Australia) Bruce Djite
LW	9	(Spain) Sergio Cirio
Substitutes:
GK	20	(Australia) John Hall
DF	21	(Australia) Tarek Elrich	(substituted on) 73'
DF	23	(Australia) Jordan Elsey
MF	14	(Australia) George Mells	(substituted on) 90'
FW	7	(Spain) Pablo Sánchez	(substituted on) 86'
Manager:
(Spain) Guillermo Amor

GK	20	(Australia) Andrew Redmayne
RB	12	(Australia) Scott Neville
CB	17	(Spain) Alberto
CB	4	(Australia) Nikolai Topor-Stanley	(yellow card) 33'
LB	3	(Australia) Scott Jamieson	(yellow card) 50'	(substituted off) 86'
CM	8	(Spain) Dimas	(yellow card) 81'
CM	18	(Spain) Andreu	(yellow card) 42'	(substituted off) 78'
AM	6	(Australia) Mitch Nichols		(substituted off) 56'
RW	7	(Netherlands) Romeo Castelen
CF	11	(Australia) Brendon Šantalab
LW	19	(Australia) Mark Bridge
Substitutes:
GK	30	(Australia) Liam Reddy
DF	2	(Australia) Shannon Cole		(substituted on) 86'
DF	5	(Australia) Brendan Hamill
MF	10	(Australia) Dario Vidošić		(substituted on) 56'
FW	15	(Australia) Kearyn Baccus		(substituted on) 78'
Manager:
(Australia) Tony Popovic

Joe Marston Medal:
Isaías (Adelaide United)

Assistant referees:
Matthew Cream
Luke Brennan
Fourth official:
Paul Cetrangolo
Additional assistant referees:
Strebre Delovski
Chris Beath

**Match rules**

- 90 minutes.
- 30 minutes of extra time if necessary.
- Penalty shoot-out if scores still level.
- Five named substitutes.
- Maximum of three substitutions.

=== Statistics ===
Overall statistics
	Adelaide United	Western Sydney Wanderers
Goals scored	3	1
Total shots	15	10
Shots on target	7	3
Ball possession	35.7%	64.3%
Corner kicks	5	6
Fouls Conceded	18	14
Offsides	1	3
Yellow cards	0	4
Red cards	0	0

== Broadcasting ==
As with the previous season, the 2016 A-League Grand Final was broadcast in Australia on Foxtel and on free-to-air TV, with SBS showing the game on a one-hour delay. The Grand Final was also broadcast live on ABC NewsRadio. In New Zealand the match was broadcast live on Sky Sport.

== See also ==
- 2015–16 A-League
- List of A-League honours
