= Isaías Sánchez =

Spanish footballer

Isaías
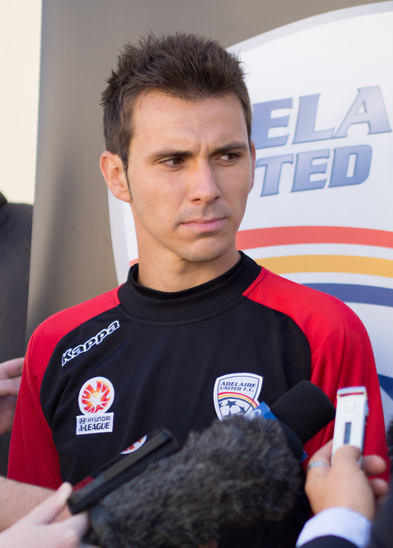
- Isaías being presented by Adelaide United in 2013

Personal information
- Full name: Isaías Sánchez Cortés
- Date of birth: 9 February 1987 (age 39)
- Place of birth: Sabadell, Spain
- Height: 1.73 m (5 ft 8 in)
- Position: Central midfielder

Team information
- Current team: Adelaide United (assistant)

Youth career
- 1993–2001: Damm
- 2001–2004: Mercantil
- 2004–2006: Badalona

Senior career*
Years	Team	Apps	(Gls)
2006–2010	Badalona	84	(0)
2010–2011	Espanyol B	23	(0)
2011–2013	Espanyol	4	(0)
2011–2013	→ Ponferradina (loan)	55	(1)
2013–2019	Adelaide United	158	(10)
2019–2021	Al-Wakrah	37	(0)
2021–2025	Adelaide United	97	(0)
Total		458	(11)
- * Club domestic league appearances and goals

Isaías Sánchez Cortés (Spanish pronunciation: [isaˈi.as ˈsantʃeθ koɾˈtes]; born 9 February 1987), known simply as Isaías, is a Spanish former professional footballer who played as a central midfielder. He is currently assistant manager of A-League club Adelaide United.

He spent most of his career in Australia with Adelaide United after signing in 2013, making 289 competitive appearances and being named the club's player of the season on four occasions. He was instrumental in their 2015–16 double winning season, which included a goal in the 2016 Grand Final. Prior to his arrival, he played four La Liga matches with Espanyol.

== Club career ==
=== Early years and Espanyol ===
Born in Sabadell, Barcelona, Catalonia, Isaías was a CF Badalona youth graduate, and started playing professionally with that club in the Segunda División B while also working as a part-time plumber. In 2010 he signed for RCD Espanyol, but spent the majority of his first year with the reserves in the Tercera División.

On 10 April 2011, Isaías made his first-team and La Liga debut, playing the last 22 minutes of a 0–0 away draw against Hércules CF. He spent the following two seasons on loan to SD Ponferradina, contributing 27 games and one goal in his second to help the side to return to Segunda División.

=== Adelaide United ===
In July 2013, Isaías signed for Adelaide United FC, penning a two-year contract. He won the Player of The Year award for his team in his debut campaign in the A-League.

Isaías scored his first goal for the club on 24 January 2015, netting from 25 meters in a 7–0 win over the Newcastle Jets FC. He repeated the feat in the 2016 A-League Grand Final in an eventual 3–1 defeat of Western Sydney Wanderers FC, through a 34th-minute free kick.

On 23 September 2017, Isaías was announced as captain at Adelaide United's season launch, taking over from Eugene Galekovic who transferred to Melbourne City FC. In January 2019, the 32-year-old became an Australian citizen.

Isaías left Adelaide United in May 2019, in order to explore overseas opportunities.

=== Later career ===
On 4 July 2019, recently promoted Al-Wakrah SC announced on Twitter the transfer of Isaías for an undisclosed fee. The 34-year-old returned to Adelaide United on 23 August 2021, signing a three-year deal.

At the end of the 2023–24 campaign, Isaías agreed to a new contract alongside his teammate Javi López, one that would see out his playing career as he also completed a coaching badge with the club. On 18 April 2025, he came off the bench in a 3–2 victory over Wellington Phoenix FC to become the Reds' most capped player in all competitions at 286 games, surpassing Galekovic.

Both Isaías and López announced their retirement on 13 May 2025. In July, the former was appointed Adelaide's assistant manager.

== Style of play ==
Playing as a defensive midfielder for Adelaide United, Isaías can switch between defensive and offensive positions and also drops into defense, allowing the full-backs to push forward. He is known for his ability to control the pace and intensity of the game, keep possession of the ball and launch attacks when his team plays from defence to attack.

Isaías was described by Adelaide manager Josep Gombau as his "foot soldier", being a complete footballer with technique, speed and controlled aggression.

== Career statistics ==
As of 9 May 2025

Appearances and goals by club, season and competition
Club	Season	League			Cup		Other		Total	
Club	Season	Division	Apps	Goals	Apps	Goals	Apps	Goals	Apps	Goals
Badalona	2006–07	Segunda División B	12	0	4	0	—		16	0
Badalona	2007–08	Segunda División B	18	0	1	0	—		19	0
Badalona	2008–09	Segunda División B	32	0	—		—		32	0
Badalona	2009–10	Segunda División B	22	0	—		—		22	0
Badalona	Total		84	0	5	0	—		89	0
Espanyol	2010–11	La Liga	4	0	0	0	—		4	0
Ponferradina (loan)	2011–12	Segunda División B	27	1	4	0	6 (Note: Appearances in Segunda División B play-offs)	0	37	1
Ponferradina (loan)	2012–13	Segunda División	28	0	4	0	—		32	0
Ponferradina (loan)	Total		55	1	8	0	6	0	69	1
Adelaide United	2013–14	A-League	27	0	—		—		27	0
Adelaide United	2014–15	A-League	27	1	5	0	—		32	1
Adelaide United	2015–16	A-League	27	4	3	0	1 (Note: Appearances in AFC Champions League)	0	31	4
Adelaide United	2016–17	A-League	22	1	1	0	3	0	26	1
Adelaide United	2017–18	A-League	26	0	5	0	0	0	31	0
Adelaide United	2018–19	A-League	29	4	5	0	0	0	34	4
Adelaide United	Total		158	10	19	0	4	0	181	10
Al-Wakrah	2019–20	Qatar Stars League	22	0	4	0	0	0	26	0
Al-Wakrah	2020–21	Qatar Stars League	15	0	5	1	1 (Note: Appearance in Emir of Qatar Cup)	0	21	1
Al-Wakrah	Total		37	0	9	1	1	0	47	1
Adelaide United	2021–22	A-League Men	25	0	2	0	0	0	27	0
Adelaide United	2022–23	A-League Men	25	0	3	0	0	0	28	0
Adelaide United	2023–24	A-League Men	25	0	2	0	0	0	27	0
Adelaide United	2024–25	A-League Men	22	0	4	0	0	0	26	0
Adelaide United	Total		97	0	11	0	0	0	108	0
Career total			435	11	52	1	11	0	498	12

== Honours ==
Adelaide United

- A-League Championship: 2016
- A-League Premiership: 2015–16
- FFA Cup: 2014, 2018

Individual

- Joe Marston Medal: 2016
- A-Leagues All Star: 2022
- Aurelio Vidmar Club Champion: 2013–14, 2016–17, 2017–18, 2018–19
