= Jimmy Jeggo =

Australian soccer player (born 1992)

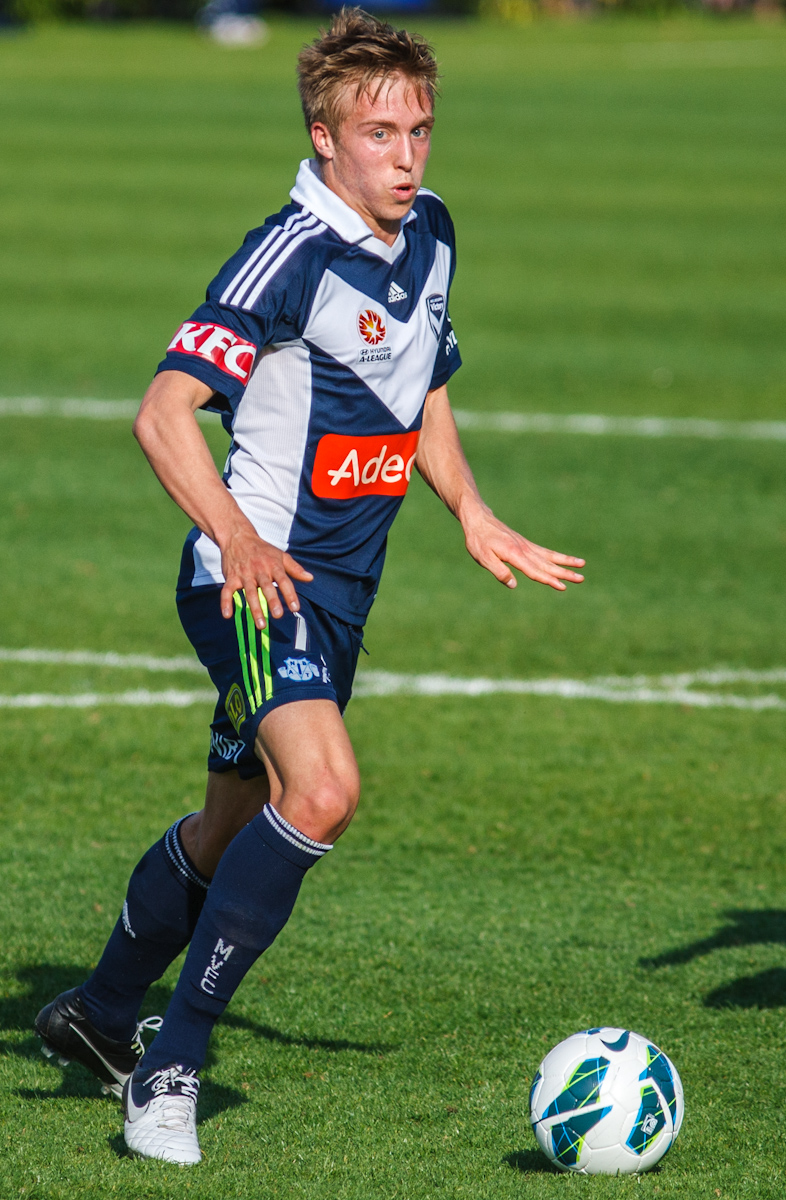
- Jeggo playing for Melbourne Victory in 2012

Personal information
- Full name: James Alexander Jeggo
- Date of birth: 12 February 1992 (age 34)
- Place of birth: Vienna, Austria
- Height: 1.79 m (5 ft 10 in)
- Position: Central midfielder

Youth career
- 1999–2002: SV Schwechat
- 2002–2006: Green Gully
- 2006–2010: VIS
- 2010–2011: Melbourne Victory

Senior career*
Years	Team	Apps	(Gls)
2011	VTC Football	10	(0)
2011–2014	Melbourne Victory	30	(2)
2014–2016	Adelaide United	43	(2)
2016–2018	Sturm Graz	61	(1)
2016	Sturm Graz II	3	(0)
2018–2020	Austria Wien	46	(1)
2020–2022	Aris	45	(0)
2022–2023	Eupen	23	(0)
2023–2024	Hibernian	36	(0)
2024–2025	Melbourne City	18	(0)
Total		315	(6)

International career
2018–2022	Australia	15	(0)
- * Club domestic league appearances and goals

James Alexander Jeggo (/ˈdʒɛɡoʊ/ JEG-oh; born 12 February 1992) is a retired Australian professional soccer player who played as a central midfielder for A-League Men club Melbourne City. Born in Austria, he plays for the Australia national team. Jeggo moved to Australia as a child, where he started his footballing career in youth football with Green Gully and at the Victorian Institute of Sport before making his professional debut for Melbourne Victory.

== Early life ==
Jeggo was born in Vienna, Austria. He moved to Australia as a child, growing up in Melbourne, Victoria. He has a brother Luc Jeggo who formerly captained the Melbourne Victory youth team, and currently plays for NPL Victoria club Preston Lions.

== Club career ==
=== Melbourne Victory ===
On 21 March 2011, Jeggo signed a three-year senior contract with A-League club Melbourne Victory after performing very well in the National Youth League. He made his professional debut in the 2011–12 A-League season on 12 November 2011, in a round 6 clash against Central Coast Mariners. Jimmy Jeggo, as referred to by the Melbourne Victory fans quickly become a fan favourite in his few appearances for Melbourne. On 10 February 2012, he was selected for his first league start for Melbourne Victory against the Central Coast Mariners at AAMI Park, where Victory went on to record a 2–1 come from behind win. Jimmy Jeggo's first league goal for the Melbourne Victory came on 16 March 2012, with a strike from outside the penalty box, in their 3–0 win over Wellington Phoenix, which would be the final home game Melbourne Victory would play in the 2011-12 A-League season.

The 2012–13 A-League season saw James Jeggo's first team opportunities reduced. He played 310 minutes, mostly from the bench, less than half the time of his break out season of 2011–12.

=== Adelaide United ===
On 1 May 2014, Jeggo signed with Adelaide United following his release from Melbourne Victory as the Victorian A-League team declined to renew his contract. Jimmy made his debut for Adelaide in round one of the 2014–15 A-League season at Lang Park, Brisbane verse then champions Brisbane Roar. Jeggo started in midfield and played the whole match as United won two goals to one. Jeggo became a regular starter at Adelaide United under Josep Gombau, playing in attacking midfield, Jeggo won the A-League Young Footballer of the Year for the 2014–15 A-League season. Jeggo played a full match for the Reds in the inaugural 2014 FFA Cup Final. Adelaide secured victory over Perth Glory in the final 1–0 with Jeggo claiming his first club trophy of his career.

=== Sturm Graz ===
On 27 January 2016, Jeggo was released from Adelaide United to join Austrian club Sturm Graz for an undisclosed fee.

On 9 May 2018, he played as Sturm Graz beat Red Bull Salzburg in extra time to win the 2017–18 Austrian Cup.

=== Austria Wien ===
On 25 May 2018, Jeggo joined Austria Wien after rejecting a contract extension from Sturm Graz.

=== Aris ===
On 16 August 2020, Jeggo joined Greek club Aris. Jeggo was roommates with Celtic's Luis Palma.

=== Eupen ===
On 4 February 2022, Jeggo signed a 1.5-year contract with Eupen in Belgium.

=== Hibernian ===
Jeggo signed an 18-month contract with Scottish club Hibernian in January 2023. He made his debut a day after signing for Hibernian, starting in a 0–3 defeat to Edinburgh derby rivals Hearts in the Scottish Cup.

=== Melbourne City ===
Jeggo returned to Australia in January 2024 and signed for Melbourne City.

== International career ==
On 7 March 2011, Jeggo was selected to represent the Australia Olympic football team in an Asian Olympic Qualifier match against Iraq.

After establishing himself in the starting squad for Sturm Graz at the beginning of the 2016–17 season, playing a key role as a defensive midfielder, Jeggo was called up to the Australia senior side for World Cup qualifiers against Saudi Arabia and Japan in October 2016.

On 20 November 2018, Jeggo made his debut for the Australia senior national team in a friendly match at ANZ Stadium against Lebanon. He came on as a second-half substitute in the 74th minute and replaced Mustafa Amini in midfield and Australia won the match 3–0.

== Career statistics ==
=== Club ===
As of match played on 27 January 2024

Appearances and goals by club, season and competition
Club	Season	League			Cup		Continental		Total	
Club	Season	Division	Apps	Goals	Apps	Goals	Apps	Goals	Apps	Goals
VTC Football	2011	Victorian Premier League	10	0	0	0	0	0	10	0
Melbourne Victory	2011–12	A-League	9	1	0	0	0	0	9	1
Melbourne Victory	2012–13	A-League	10	0	0	0	0	0	10	0
Melbourne Victory	2013–14	A-League	11	1	0	0	4	1	15	2
Melbourne Victory	Total		30	2	0	0	4	1	34	3
Adelaide United	2014–15	A-League	28	1	5	0	0	0	33	1
Adelaide United	2015–16	A-League	15	1	3	2	0	0	18	3
Adelaide United	Total		43	2	8	2	0	0	51	4
Sturm Graz II	2015–16	Austrian Regional League	3	0	0	0	0	0	3	0
Sturm Graz	2015–16	Austrian Bundesliga	0	0	1	0	0	0	1	0
Sturm Graz	2016–17	Austrian Bundesliga	32	0	3	0	0	0	35	0
Sturm Graz	2017–18	Austrian Bundesliga	29	1	6	0	2	0	37	1
Sturm Graz	Total		61	1	10	0	2	0	73	1
Austria Wien	2018–19	Austrian Bundesliga	19	1	3	0	0	0	22	1
Austria Wien	2019–20	Austrian Bundesliga	29	0	2	0	2	0	33	0
Austria Wien	Total		48	1	5	0	2	0	55	1
Aris	2020–21	Superleague Greece	30	0	4	0	1	0	35	0
Aris	2021–22	Superleague Greece	15	0	3	0	2	0	20	0
Aris	Total		45	0	7	0	3	0	55	0
Eupen	2021–22	Belgian Pro League	9	0	1	0	0	0	10	0
Eupen	2022–23	Belgian Pro League	14	0	1	0	0	0	15	0
Eupen	Total		23	0	2	0	0	0	25	0
Hibernian	2022–23	Scottish Premiership	16	0	1	0	0	0	17	0
Hibernian	2023–24	Scottish Premiership	20	0	3	0	5	0	28	0
Hibernian	Total		36	0	4	0	5	0	45	0
Career total			299	6	36	2	16	1	351	9

=== International ===
As of match played 14 November 2019

Appearances and goals by national team and year
National team	Year	Apps	Goals
Australia	2018	1	0
Australia	2019	4	0
Total		5	0

== Honours ==
Adelaide United

- FFA Cup: 2014

Sturm Graz

- Austrian Cup: 2017–18

Individual

- A-League Young Footballer of the Year: 2014–15
