= Bruce Kamau =

Australian soccer player (born 1995)

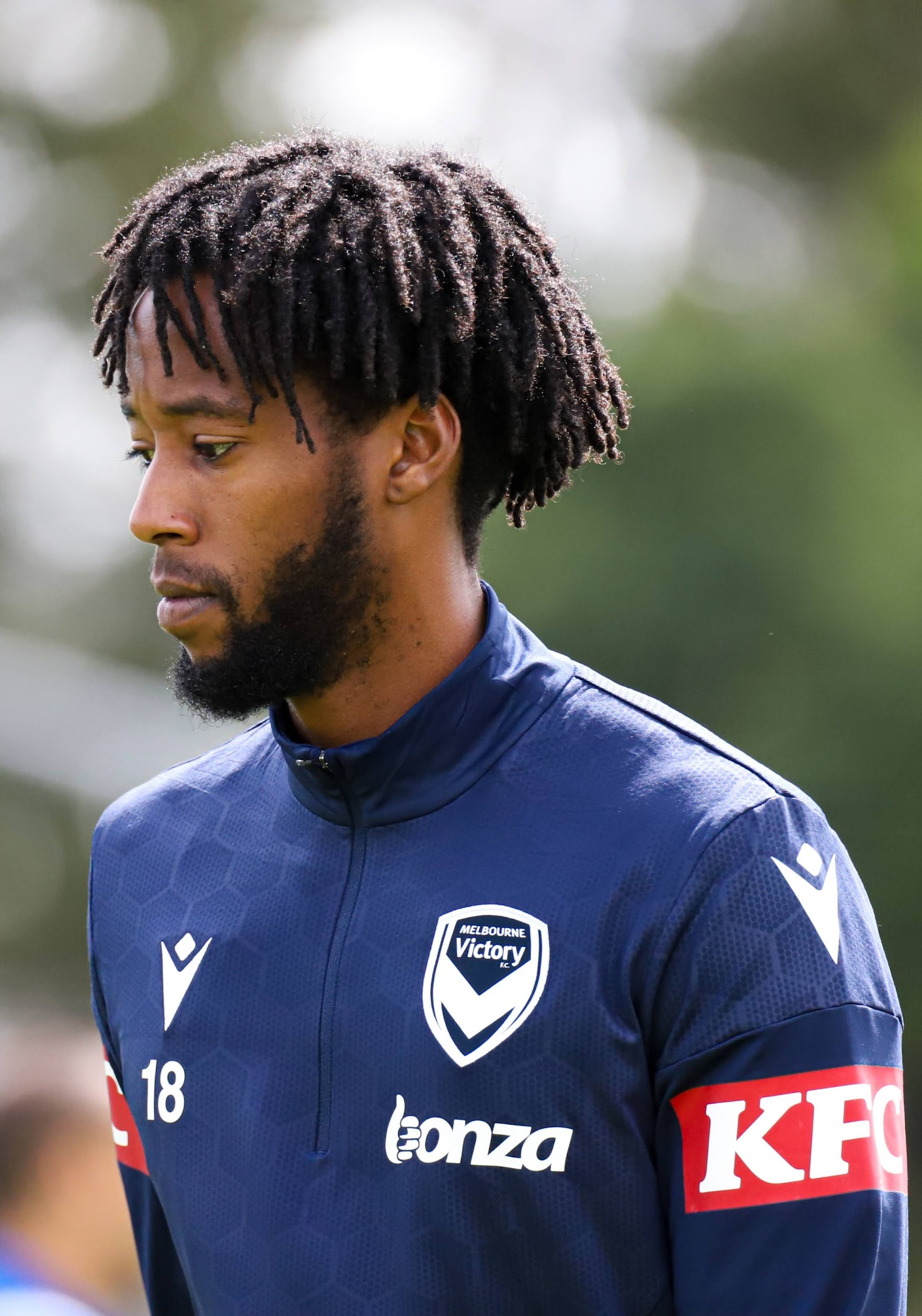
- Kamau in 2023

Personal information
- Full name: Bruce Kamau
- Date of birth: 28 March 1995 (age 31)
- Place of birth: Nairobi, Kenya
- Height: 1.77 m (5 ft 10 in)
- Positions: Winger; attacking midfielder

Team information
- Current team: Adelaide City

Youth career
- N.A.B.
- Campbelltown City
- Adelaide City
- 2013–2015: Adelaide United

Senior career*
Years	Team	Apps	(Gls)
2012–2014	Adelaide Olympic	44	(16)
2014–2016	Adelaide United	30	(3)
2016–2018	Melbourne City	42	(4)
2018–2021	Western Sydney Wanderers	64	(10)
2021–2023	OFI	22	(1)
2023	→ Melbourne Victory (loan)	8	(0)
2023–2024	Perth Glory	21	(0)
2025–2026	Adelaide City	14	(2)
2026–	Budaiya	0	(0)

International career^{‡}
2017–2018	Australia U23	5	(2)
- * Club domestic league appearances and goals as of 22 January 2026 ‡ National team caps and goals as of 22 January 2026

Bruce Kamau (born 28 March 1995) is a professional soccer player who plays as a winger for Bahraini Premier League club Budaiya Club. Born in Kenya, he has represented Australia at youth level and plays for the Kenya national team.

== Early life ==
Born in Kenya, Kamau moved to Australia at age 4. He attended Rostrevor College.

== Career ==
=== Adelaide United ===
He made his senior professional debut for Adelaide United in the 2014 FFA Cup in a match against Wellington Phoenix at the Marden Sports Complex on 5 August 2014. Adelaide won the match 1–0 in regulation time. He subsequently made his A-League debut in a match against Brisbane Roar in Round one of the 2014–15 A-League season.

Kamau scored his first A-League goal for Adelaide in a 1–0 win away to Melbourne Victory on 19 February 2016, in the 90th minute of the match in Round 20 of the 2015–16 season. Kamau started in the 2016 A-League Grand Final, scoring the first goal of the game.

=== Melbourne City ===
At the end of the season, after winning the Premiership and Championship with Adelaide United, Kamau joined Melbourne City. Kamau made his unofficial City debut in a 4–0 pre-season victory over NPL Victoria side Melbourne Knights FC.

=== Western Sydney Wanderers ===
On 3 May 2018, Kamau was released by Melbourne City and joined Western Sydney Wanderers. The club announced a squad update on 16 October 2020 where Kamau was omitted suggesting his departure from the club, but a month later announced that Kamau had re-signed. At the end of his contract, Kamau left the club to take up an opportunity overseas.

=== OFI ===
In July 2021, Kamau joined Greek Super League club OFI on a three-year contract.

==== Loan to Melbourne Victory ====
In February 2023, Kamau was loaned to A-League Men club Melbourne Victory until the end of the 2022–23 A-League Men season.

=== Perth Glory ===
In August 2023, Perth Glory announced the signing of Kamau ahead of the 2023–24 A-League Men season.

== International career ==
Kamau was named for the Kenya national team provisional squad for a set of 2026 FIFA World Cup qualification matches in June 2024.

== Career statistics ==
=== Club ===
As of 16 July 2023

Club	Season	League			Cup		Continental		Total	
Club	Season	Division	Apps	Goals	Apps	Goals	Apps	Goals	Apps	Goals
Adelaide United	2014–15	A-League	11	0	2	0	0	0	13	0
Adelaide United	2015–16	A-League	18	3	0	0	1	0	19	3
Adelaide United	Total		29	3	2	0	1	0	32	3
Melbourne City	2016–17	A-League	26	1	4	0	0	0	30	1
Melbourne City	2017–18	A-League	16	3	2	0	0	0	18	3
Melbourne City	Total		42	4	6	0	0	0	48	4
Western Sydney Wanderers	2018–19	A-League	27	1	1	0	0	0	27	1
Western Sydney Wanderers	2019–20	A-League	14	0	3	1	0	0	17	1
Western Sydney Wanderers	2020–21	A-League	23	9	0	0	0	0	23	9
Western Sydney Wanderers	Total		64	10	4	1	0	0	68	11
OFI	2021–22	Super League Greece	19	1	3	0	0	0	22	1
OFI	2022–23	Super League Greece	3	0	0	0	0	0	3	0
OFI	Total		22	1	3	0	0	0	25	1
Melbourne Victory (loan)	2022–23	A-League Men	9	0	0	0	0	0	9	0
Career total			166	18	15	1	1	0	182	19

=== International ===
No.	Date	Venue	Opponent	Score	Result	Competition
1.	23 July 2017	Thuwunna Stadium, Yangon, Myanmar	Myanmar	1–0	3–0	2020 AFC U-23 Championship qualification
2.	11 January 2018	Kunshan Stadium, Kunshan, China	Syria	2–0	3–1	2018 AFC U-23 Championship

== Honours ==
Adelaide United

- A-League Premiership: 2015–16
- A-League Championship: 2015–16
- FFA Cup: 2014

Melbourne City

- FFA Cup: 2016
