= Tarek Elrich =

Australian footballer (born 1987)

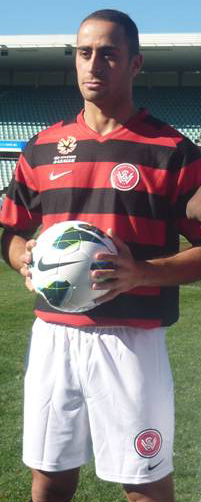
- Elrich with Western Sydney Wanderers in 2012

Personal information
- Full name: Tarek Elrich
- Date of birth: 1 January 1987 (age 39)
- Place of birth: Sydney, New South Wales, Australia
- Height: 1.88 m (6 ft 2 in)
- Position: Right back

Team information
- Current team: Parramatta FC
- Number: 21

Youth career
- Parramatta Eagles
- 2003–2005: Sydney Olympic

Senior career*
Years	Team	Apps	(Gls)
2003–2005	Sydney Olympic	2	(0)
2005–2012	Newcastle Jets	134	(4)
2012–2013	Western Sydney Wanderers	11	(0)
2013–2018	Adelaide United	101	(3)
2018–2020	Western Sydney Wanderers	32	(2)
2020	Perth Glory	10	(0)
2021–2023	Mt Druitt Town Rangers	64	(0)
2024–	Parramatta FC	27	(3)

International career^{‡}
2005–2006	Australia U-20	12	(1)
2008	Australia U-23	5	(0)
2015	Australia	3	(0)
- * Club domestic league appearances and goals as of 15 January 2025 ‡ National team caps and goals as of 8 October 2015

Tarek Elrich (born 1 January 1987) is an Australian professional soccer player who plays as a right-back or midfielder for Parramatta FC in NSW League Two.

Elrich started his senior career with local club Sydney Olympic, before moving to the Newcastle Jets in 2006. In 2012, he moved to new club Western Sydney Wanderers before moving again to Adelaide United one season later.

Tarek played youth football for Australia, before being called up to the Lebanon national team in 2012. However, he was ruled to be ineligible, having been an unused substitute for Australia in 2011 AFC Asian Cup qualification. He was later called up for Australia once again, and made his debut in early 2015.

== Early life ==
Elrich grew up in Auburn, Sydney, and is of Lebanese descent. His brother Ahmad is also an international footballer. Tarek attended Granville Boys High School.

== Club career ==
=== Early career ===
Elrich played youth football at a number of clubs, including Parramatta Eagles in the NSW Premier Youth League, and Sydney Olympic in the NSW Premier League.

=== Newcastle Jets ===
Elrich debuted in the A-League during the 2005–06 season, where which he only made three league appearances. Elrich again only made a handful of league appearances (five) during the 2006–07 season as Newcastle finished in third place on the A-League ladder. He scored his first A-League goal in the 2007–08 season during Newcastle's 3–2 preliminary final extra-time win against Queensland Roar on 17 February 2008. Elrich scored in the 111th minute. Newcastle went on to eventually beat Central Coast Mariners 1–0 in the final and qualify for the 2009 AFC Champions League. During the 2007–08 season, Elrich faced his brother, Ahmad Elrich, in a 2–1 home victory against Wellington Phoenix on 14 October 2007.

Elrich scored his first goal of the 2008–09 season in a 2–2 home draw against Wellington Phoenix on 6 October 2008. One month later, he scored his second goal of the 2008–09 season in a 2–2 away draw against Perth Glory on 9 November 2008. Having increased his appearances during the 2007–08 season and 2008–09 season, he attracted the attention of then, Australian national team coach Pim Verbeek, who included Elrich in a 2011 AFC Asian Cup qualification match in January 2009. Elrich debuted in the 2009 AFC Champions League in a 2–0 away defeat against Beijing Guoan on 10 March. He scored his first AFC Champions League goal in a 1–1 away draw against Nagoya Grampus on 7 April, scoring the first goal of the game after 9 minutes. Elrich participated in all of Newcastle's group stage fixtures as they finished in second position of their respective group. Newcastle qualified for the knockout stages where they were eventually eliminated in the round of 16 in a 6–0 away defeat to Pohang Steelers on 24 June.

Elrich went on to make 29 league appearances during the 2009–10 season, where he received his first red card in the 90th minute of a 2–1 away defeat to Sydney on 20 September 2009. During the 2011–12 season, Elrich received his second A-League red card in the 53rd minute of a 2–1 away defeat to Melbourne Victory on 7 January 2012. Over one month later, Elrich scored the only goal in the 39th minute of a 1–0 home victory against Adelaide United on 24 February 2012. Newcastle finished the season in 7th position of the A-League ladder with 35 points. At the conclusion of the 2011–12, Perth Glory and Sydney expressed interest in signing Elrich as Newcastle did not offer an extension to his contract.

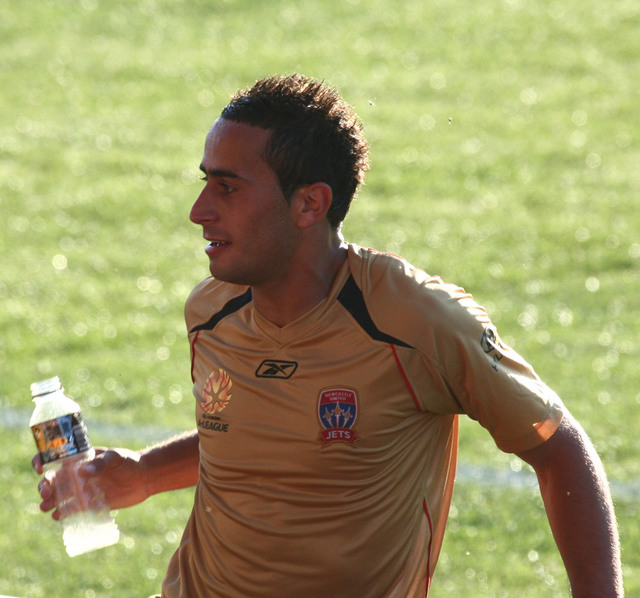
Elrich with Newcastle United Jets.

=== Western Sydney Wanderers ===
It was confirmed on 25 June 2012 that Elrich had signed with Western Sydney for the 2012–13 season. He was one of the club's first three signings, along with Aaron Mooy and Kwabena Appiah-Kubi.

Elrich, along with teammates Dino Kresinger, Joey Gibbs and Rocky Visconte were released by the Wanderers at the conclusion of the 2012–13 A-League season.

=== Adelaide United ===
Following limited success with the Wanderers, Elrich was signed by Adelaide United for the 2013–14 season. He won his first silverware with Adelaide as part of the 2014 FFA Cup winning side.

In the 2014–15 A-League season, Elrich scored a solo goal against Melbourne City in a 4–1 win with some pundits claiming the goal to be worthy of the yearly Puskas award. After this season at right-back with the Reds, he was selected in the 2014–2015 PFA Team of the Year.

In recognition of his run of form, Elrich was awarded a 2-year contract extension on 29 September 2015 running through to the 2017–18 A-League season.

=== Return to Western Sydney Wanderers ===
After 5 years at Adelaide United, on 9 May 2018, Elrich left to return to Western Sydney Wanderers, signing a two-year contract. On 24 January 2020, the club announced his departure, his final game coming against the Perth Glory.

=== Perth Glory ===
Elrich then joined Perth Glory on an 18-month contract before the January transfer window shut, going on to play 10 A-League games, finishing with a 2–0 loss in the finals series semi-final match against Sydney FC. Prior to the start of the 2020–21 A-League season, Elrich left Perth via a mutual contract termination.

=== Mt Druitt Town Rangers ===
In January 2021, Elrich joined Mt Druitt Town Rangers in the National Premier Leagues NSW.

=== Parramatta FC ===
In January 2024, Elrich joined Parramatta FC as their Head of Football.

== International career ==
=== Australia U20 ===
Elrich debuted for the Australia national under-20 team in a 3–0 win against Turkmenistan during a 2006 AFC Youth Championship qualification match on 22 February 2006. Australia finished in first position of their respective group and qualified for the 2006 AFC Youth Championship. Elrich then received a call up to a 20-man Australia U20 national team squad for a five-match tour of South America in August 2006. He participated in matches against Colo-Colo U20, Universidad de Chile U20, Chile U20 and Argentina U20. The South American tour was preparation for the 2006 AFC Youth Championship, the qualification campaign for the eventual 2007 FIFA U-20 World Cup.

=== Australia ===
Elrich was called up to the Australia national team for a 2011 AFC Asian Cup qualification match against Indonesia. Wearing the number #69 shirt, he was an unused substitute in the 0–0 draw in Jakarta on 28 January 2009.

=== Lebanon ===
After accepting an invitation from the Lebanese Football Federation to play for the Lebanon national football team, Elrich eventually debuted for Lebanon in a non-official friendly match against Lebanese Premier League club Al-Akhaa Al-Ahli Aley on 20 April 2012. The match was preparation for an international friendly scheduled for 17 May against Jordan, where Lebanon would prepare for the AFC fourth round of 2014 FIFA World Cup qualifiers. Elrich became the third Australian-born player to represent Lebanon, after Michael Reda (1999–2000) and Buddy Farah (2000–2004). Elrich, however, was not included in Theo Bucker's plans for the remainder of Lebanon's 2014 FIFA World Cup qualifying campaign. He was advised by FIFA in September 2012 that he was not eligible to represent Lebanon as he had been named in a match between Australia and Indonesia in 2009. Suddenly, later FIFA accepted him to serve for Lebanon in 2013, the only reason being that he did not play in the match between Australia and Indonesia, and he was not recalled to Australia.

=== Australia ===
On the back of a great season with Adelaide United, Tarek was called up to the Australia national team camp for the friendly games against Germany and Macedonia. Tarek made his full senior international debut for Australia on 30 March 2015 after being named in the starting 11 for the international friendly against Macedonia in Skopje.

== Honours ==
Newcastle Jets

- A-League Championship: 2007–08

Western Sydney Wanderers

- A-League Premiership: 2012–13

Adelaide United

- A-League Championship: 2015–16
- A-League Premiership: 2015–16
- FFA Cup: 2014

Australia

- AFF U-20 Youth Championship: 2006

Individual

- PFA A-League Team of the Season: 2008–09, 2014–15
- A-League Goal of the Year: 2014–15
- Adelaide United FC Player’s Player - A-League: 2014–15
- Adelaide United FC Remo Paris Club Person: 2014–15, 2015–16
