= Dylan McGowan =

Australian soccer player (born 1991)

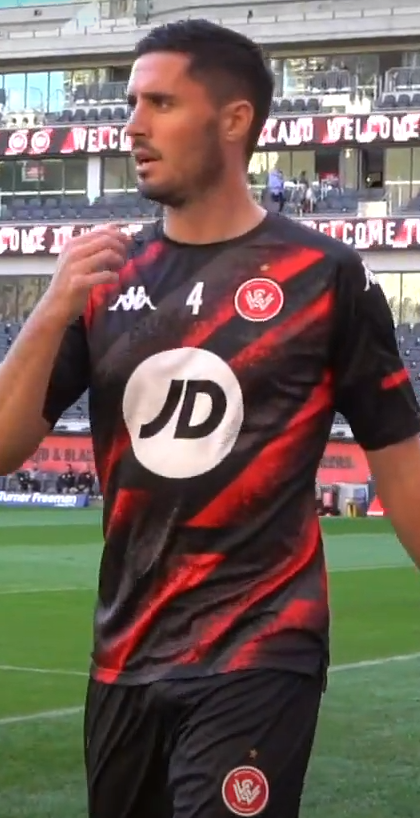
- McGowan with Western Sydney Wanderers in 2021

Personal information
- Full name: Dylan John McGowan
- Date of birth: 6 August 1991 (age 35)
- Place of birth: Adelaide, Australia
- Height: 1.86 m (6 ft 1 in)
- Position: Defender

Team information
- Current team: Hamilton Academical
- Number: 6

Youth career
- 2003–2008: Para Hills Knights
- 2008–2010: Heart of Midlothian

Senior career*
Years	Team	Apps	(Gls)
2010–2014	Heart of Midlothian	64	(0)
2010–2011	→ East Fife (loan)	23	(1)
2011–2012	→ Gold Coast United (loan)	18	(0)
2014–2017	Adelaide United	82	(7)
2017–2019	Paços de Ferreira	0	(0)
2018	→ Gangwon (loan)	15	(1)
2019	Vendsyssel	3	(1)
2019–2021	Western Sydney Wanderers	41	(1)
2021–2023	Kilmarnock	26	(0)
2023	→ Hamilton Academical (loan)	16	(1)
2023–2026	Hamilton Academical	44	(1)

International career^{‡}
2008–2011	Australia U-20	28	(4)
2012	Australia U-23	2	(0)
2017	Australia	1	(0)
Medal record
Representing Australia
Men's Association football
AFC U-20 Asian Cup
Runner-up	2010 China
- * Club domestic league appearances and goals as of 11 June 2025 ‡ National team caps and goals as of 15 November 2017

Dylan John McGowan (born 6 August 1991) is an Australian former professional soccer player who played as a defender.

McGowan was born in Adelaide, Australia, where he played youth football for Para Hills Knights before moving to Heart of Midlothian in his parents' homeland, where he made his debut after loan spells for East Fife and Gold Coast United. McGowan returned to Australia to play in the A-League for Adelaide United, where he remained for three seasons, winning the FFA Cup and A-League Championship. He had short stints in Portugal, South Korea and Denmark's top tiers before returning to Australia for Western Sydney Wanderers for two seasons. He returned to Scotland in 2021 with Kilmarnock, winning the Scottish Championship and spending time on loan at Hamilton Academical. He retired in 2026.

McGowan made one appearance for the Australian national team in 2017, in addition to numerous appearances for Australian youth teams. His brother, Ryan, also represented Hearts and the Australian national side.

== Early life ==
McGowan was born in Adelaide into a Scottish family from Glasgow. He is the brother of fellow footballer Ryan McGowan.

== Club career ==
=== Heart of Midlothian ===
McGowan signed for Heart of Midlothian in 2008 from Para Hills Knights.

Following his loan spells McGowan returned to Hearts. McGowan made his debut for the club coming on as substitute for Mehdi Taouil in the 84th minutes, in a 3–0 win over Dundee United on 22 September 2012. In a 0–0 draw against Hibernian on 4 January 2013, McGowan drew praise from Manager John McGlynn for a good display, including stopping striker Leigh Griffiths. McGowan started at right back when Hearts lost 3–2 to St Mirren in the Scottish League Cup Final. McGowan signed a new one-year contract, having started negotiations in January.

McGowan made the switch from the number 74 shirt for number 5 following the departure of Darren Barr. He made a good start when he provided a cross to Callum Paterson to make it 1–0 against Hibernian, which Hearts won on 11 August 2013. McGowan was an ever present in the team making thirty-seven appearances at the end of the 2013–14 season, With the club in administration McGowan along with other experienced players were released by the club upon expiry of his contract.

=== Loan spell ===
On 16 November 2011, McGowan joined Scottish Second Division side East Fife on loan. He made his debut on 20 November, as a substitute in their 3–1 victory over Forfar in the Scottish Cup, with his league debut coming on 14 December 2010 in a 6–0 win over Stenhousemuir. On 19 April, he scored his first goal for the club scoring the opening goal in their 3–2 win over Brechin City. In all he made 25 appearances in all competitions for East Fife, scoring one goal. Manager John Robertson was interviewed after the season on gaining McGowan services for the following season, but said at our level he's too good.

In June 2011, McGowan joined A-League franchise Gold Coast United on a season long loan. He made his debut on the opening day of the season on 9 October against Wellington Phoenix.

=== Adelaide United ===
In June 2014, McGowan returned to his hometown, signing with Adelaide United on a two-year contract. Dylan made his debut for Adelaide United in the FFA Cup in the round of 32 against the Wellington Phoenix.

He scored his first goal against rivals Melbourne victory in round 22 of the 2014/15 season.

McGowan scored an extra time winner against Sydney FC to send Adelaide United to the quarterfinal of the FFA Cup on 27 August 2015.

McGowan signed a new one-year contract with Adelaide United on 7 June 2016.

=== Paços Ferreira ===
McGowan signed a two-year contract with Portuguese club Paços Ferreira on 16 May 2017.

==== Loan to Gangwon ====
In January 2018, McGowan moved to K League 1 side Gangwon on loan.

=== Western Sydney Wanderers ===
On 22 August 2019, McGowan signed with the Western Sydney Wanderers on a three-year contract. During pre-season training he injured Radosław Majewski with a poor tackle, causing a cruciate ligament injury that stopped Majewski from ever playing for the club again. Majewski later claimed the incident was deliberate, which McGowan denied at the time. McGowan was made the club Captain for the season. He agreed a mutual contract termination with the club in July 2021, having played 2 seasons at the Wanderers with 41 league appearances. The team failed to qualify for the A-League finals series in either season.

=== Kilmarnock ===
After leaving Australia, McGowan returned to Scotland, signing a two-year deal with Kilmarnock.

==== Loan to Hamilton Academical ====
On 7 January 2023, McGowan joined Scottish Championship club Hamilton Academical on loan until the end of the season. On the same day, McGowan led the side out as captain on his debut away to Ayr United.

=== Hamilton Academical ===
On 5 September 2023, McGowan rejoined Hamilton Academical, now relegated to Scottish League One on a two-year contract. He made his second debut for Accies way to Northern Irish side, Coleraine, in the third round of the SPFL Trust Trophy on 9 September 2023.

== International career ==
McGowan has been capped 28 times and has scored 4 for the Australia U-20 side and was a member of the team that finished runners-up in the 2010 AFC U-19 Championship and the U/20 World Cup in Colombia. He has been capped by the Australia U/23 team twice.

== Career statistics ==
As of 30 August 2025

Appearances and goals by club, season and competition
Club	Season	League			National cup		League cup		Continental		Other		Total	
Club	Season	Division	Apps	Goals	Apps	Goals	Apps	Goals	Apps	Goals	Apps	Goals	Apps	Goals
Heart of Midlothian	2009–10	Scottish Premier League	0	0	0	0	0	0	0	0	—		0	0
Heart of Midlothian	2012–13	Scottish Premier League	19	0	0	0	3	0	0	0	—		22	0
Heart of Midlothian	2013–14	Scottish Premiership	37	0	1	0	4	0	—		—		42	0
Heart of Midlothian	Total		56	0	1	0	7	0	0	0	0	0	64	0
East Fife (loan)	2010–11	Scottish Second Division	23	1	2	0	0	0	—		0	0	25	1
Gold Coast United (loan)	2011–12	A-League	18	0	—		—		—		—		18	0
Adelaide United	2014–15	A-League	26	1	4	0	—		—		—		26	1
Adelaide United	2015–16	A-League	29	2	2	1	—		1	0	—		32	3
Adelaide United	2016–17	A-League	27	4	1	0	—		5	1	—		33	5
Adelaide United	Total		82	7	7	1	0	0	6	1	0	0	95	9
Paços de Ferreira	2017–18	Primeira Liga	0	0	0	0	1	0	—		—		1	0
Gangwon (loan)	2018	K League 1	15	1	1	0	—		—		—		16	1
Vendsyssel	2018–19	Danish Superliga	3	1	0	0	—		—		2	0	5	1
Western Sydney Wanderers	2019–20	A-League	23	0	3	0	—		—		—		26	0
Western Sydney Wanderers	2020–21	A-League	18	0	—		—		—		—		18	0
Western Sydney Wanderers	Total		41	0	3	0	0	0	0	0	0	0	44	0
Kilmarnock	2021–22	Scottish Championship	20	0	1	0	2	0	—		0	0	23	0
Kilmarnock	2022–23	Scottish Premiership	0	0	0	0	3	0	—		—		3	0
Kilmarnock	Total		20	0	1	0	5	0	0	0	0	0	26	0
Hamilton Academical (loan)	2022–23	Scottish Championship	16	1	2	0	—		—		5	0	23	1
Hamilton Academical	2023–24	Scottish League One	30	0	1	0	0	0	—		7	0	38	0
Hamilton Academical	2024–25	Scottish Championship	14	1	2	0	1	0	—		1	0	18	0
Hamilton Academical	2025–26	Scottish League One	0	0	0	0	1	0	—		0	0	1	0
Hamilton Academical	Total		44	1	3	0	2	0	0	0	8	0	57	1
Career total			318	12	20	1	15	0	6	1	15	0	360	13

== Honours ==
Adelaide United

- FFA Cup: 2014
- A-League Championship: 2015–16
- A-League Premiership: 2015–16

Kilmarnock

- Scottish Championship: 2021–22

Hamilton Academical

- Scottish Challenge Cup: 2022–23

Australia U-20

- AFC U-20 Asian Cup: runner-up 2010
- AFF U-19 Youth Championship: 2010
