= George Mells =

Australian-Greek footballer

Personal information
- Full name: George John Mells
- Date of birth: 23 May 1997 (age 29)
- Place of birth: Melbourne, Australia
- Height: 1.81 m (5 ft 11 in)
- Position: Central midfielder

Youth career
- 2009–2011: Chelsea
- 2011–2014: Southampton

Senior career*
Years	Team	Apps	(Gls)
2015–2017	Adelaide United	31	(0)
2018–2019	Fortuna Sittard	0	(0)
2019–2021	Brisbane Roar	0	(0)
2021–2023	Port Melbourne	59	(8)
2023–2024	Avondale	32	(1)
2025	South Melbourne	14	(2)
2025	Port Melbourne	7	(2)
2026	Dandenong Thunder	15	(1)
2026-	Bentleigh Greens	6	(1)

International career^{‡}
2012	Australia U17	3	(0)
2014	Greece U17	1	(0)
2015	Australia U20	3	(1)
Medal record
Men's football
Representing Australia
AFF U-19 Youth Championship
First place	2016 Vietnam	U-20 Team
- * Club domestic league appearances and goals as of 29 January 2025 ‡ National team caps and goals as of 24 October 2015

George John Mells Jr. (born 23 May 1997) is an Australian professional footballer who plays as a central midfielder for Bentleigh Greens in the NPL Victoria.

== Football career ==
Born in Melbourne, Mells played youth football for Chelsea and Southampton before returning to Australia to make his professional debut for Adelaide United in 2015.

His contract with Brisbane Roar was terminated by mutual agreement on 23 February 2021. He played no A-League games for Brisbane Roar. A couple of days later he joined NPL Victoria club Port Melbourne.

Mells has appeared numerous times for Australian youth teams, having also previously represented Greece U17s.

In 2023, Mells won the NPL Victoria Premiership and Championship with Avondale FC, becoming the only footballer in the NPL era (2014 onwards) to have secured both the A-League and NPL Victoria doubles.

== Honours ==
=== Club ===
Adelaide United

- A-League Premiership: 2015–16
- A-League Championship: 2015–16

Avondale FC

- NPL Victoria Premiership: 2023
- NPL Victoria Championship: 2023

South Melbourne FC

- FV Community Shield: 2025

=== International ===
Australia U20

- AFF U-19 Youth Championship: 2016

== Career statistics ==
=== Club ===
As of 10 May 2021

Appearances and goals by club, season and competition
Club	Season	League			National Cup		Continental		Total	
Club	Season	Division	Apps	Goals	Apps	Goals	Apps	Goals	Apps	Goals
Adelaide United	2015–16	A-League	25	0	0	0	0	0	25	0
Adelaide United	2016–17	A-League	6	0	0	0	0	0	6	0
Adelaide United	Adelaide total		31	0	0	0	0	0	31	0
Fortuna Sittard	2018–19	Eredivisie	0	0	0	0	0	0	0	0
Brisbane Roar	2019–20	A-League	0	0	1	0	0	0	1	0
Brisbane Roar	2020–21	A-League	0	0	0	0	0	0	0	0
Brisbane Roar	Brisbane total		0	0	1	0	0	0	1	0
Port Melbourne	2021	National Premier Leagues	9	2	2	1	0	0	11	3
Career total			40	2	3	1	0	0	43	3
