= Craig Goodwin =

Australian soccer player (born 1991)

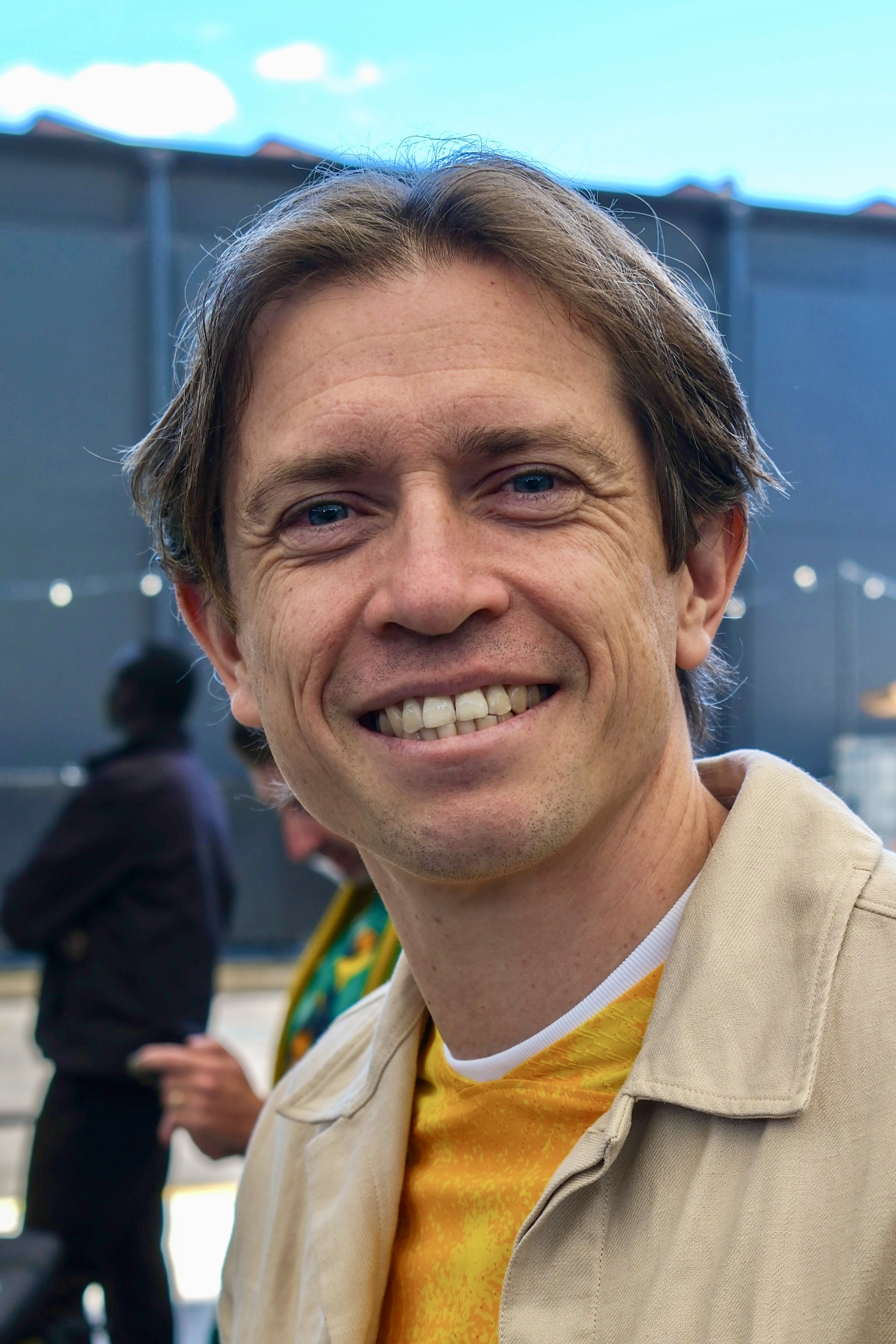
- Goodwin in 2026

Personal information
- Full name: Craig Alexander Goodwin
- Date of birth: 16 December 1991 (age 34)
- Place of birth: Adelaide, Australia
- Height: 1.83 m (6 ft 0 in)
- Position: Left winger

Team information
- Current team: Adelaide United
- Number: 11

Youth career
- Munno Para City
- Para Hills Knights
- Adelaide Raiders

Senior career*
Years	Team	Apps	(Gls)
2009–2010	Adelaide Raiders	33	(3)
2011	Oakleigh Cannons	19	(2)
2012	Melbourne Heart	4	(0)
2012–2014	Newcastle Jets	44	(5)
2014–2016	Adelaide United	55	(10)
2016–2018	Sparta Rotterdam	47	(6)
2018–2019	Adelaide United	29	(10)
2019–2022	Al-Wehda	29	(4)
2020–2021	→ Abha (loan)	16	(2)
2021–2022	→ Adelaide United (loan)	45	(16)
2022–2023	Adelaide United	28	(15)
2023–2025	Al-Wehda	50	(12)
2025–	Adelaide United	16	(3)

International career^{‡}
2012	Australia U23	1	(0)
2013–	Australia	30	(7)
- * Club domestic league appearances and goals as of 16 January 2026 ‡ National team caps and goals as of 10 October 2024

Craig Alexander Goodwin (born 16 December 1991) is an Australian professional soccer player who plays as a left winger for Adelaide United and the Australia national team. Known for his agility, crossing and shot placement, he is Adelaide United's all-time leading goalscorer and considered one of the club's greatest players.

== Club career ==
=== Early career ===
Goodwin started his career playing for amateur club Munno Para City Football Club. He later signed for one of the top local Adelaide sides Adelaide Raiders who play in the South Australian Super League. After being cut during the Adelaide United youth team trials he moved to Melbourne where he signed with Victorian Premier League side Oakleigh Cannons.

=== Melbourne Heart ===
On 2 September 2011, it was announced he had signed with the Melbourne Heart youth team who play in the National Youth League. He made his senior professional debut for Melbourne Heart during the 2011–12 A-League campaign in a round 19 fixture against Melbourne Victory in which he received the man of the match award.

=== Newcastle Jets ===
On 7 May 2012, it was announced he had signed a two-year contract with A-League club Newcastle Jets. At Newcastle, Goodwin was known for his finishing and accurate crossing, which benefited strikers Emile Heskey and Ryan Griffiths. He scored his first A-League goal against Sydney FC on 13 October 2012. His goal proved to be the winner in a 3–2 victory. Due to his consistent amazing performances Craig was nominated for NAB Young Footballer of the Year in October. On 8 April 2013 Goodwin joined English Premier League side Reading on trial for two weeks.

=== Adelaide United ===
On 7 September 2014, it was announced that Goodwin had signed with hometown A-League club Adelaide United, ending a two-year stay with Newcastle Jets.

=== Sparta Rotterdam ===
On 5 May 2016, it was announced that Goodwin had signed with Dutch club Sparta Rotterdam four days after Adelaide United's A-League Championship Grand Final victory against the Western Sydney Wanderers. He made his debut on 7 August 2016 against Ajax, coming on as a substitute for Iván Calero in the 68th minute. Goodwin scored his first goal for the club a week later, scoring the second goal for Sparta Rotterdam in their 3–0 victory over PEC Zwolle. On 1 May 2018, Goodwin and Sparta Rotterdam mutually agreed to prematurely end his contract after struggling for game time.

=== Return to Adelaide United ===
It was announced on 25 May 2018 that Goodwin had returned to Adelaide United on a 3-year contract. On 30 October 2018, he scored both of Adelaide United's goals in their FFA Cup Final victory over Sydney FC and won the Mark Viduka Medal, making him the first Australian to win the award.

=== Al-Wehda ===
On 15 July 2019, it was announced that Goodwin's buyout clause was met by Saudi Professional League side Al-Wehda for an estimated $450,000. On 17 July 2019, it was officially announced via the club's Twitter that he had signed on a two-year deal. Al-Wehda underwent a managerial change which saw a new player come in and replace Goodwin in the starting lineup, Goodwin signed a one-year contract extension and was immediately loaned out to Abha. Goodwin mutually terminated his loan with Abha over difficulties with himself and his partner living in the new city. Goodwin then returned to Adelaide United in February 2021, on a loan deal until the end of the 2020–21 A-League season. Goodwin's loan was then extended until the end of the 2021–22 A-League season.

=== Second return to Adelaide United ===
After two successive seasons on loan, Goodwin re-signed for Adelaide United in July 2022 on a three-year contract. In April 2022, while still on loan, Goodwin had become Adelaide's all-time leading goalscorer, overtaking former teammate Bruce Djite's tally of 44. He achieved this feat via a brace against Sydney FC in an A-League match. In June 2023, Goodwin won the Johnny Warren Medal, awarded to the best player of the 2022-23 A-League Men season. He was just the second Adelaide player to win the award after Marcos Flores in 2011. Goodwin was also the only player in the league to record double digits in both goals and assists – 12 goals and 10 assists from 25 appearances.

On 8 September 2023, it was announced that Goodwin would be departing Adelaide United, to make his return to the Saudi Pro League. Goodwin had stated the decision was "extremely difficult". He left the club remaining their all-time top scorer, with 60 goals across all competitions, including 53 league goals.

=== Return to Al-Wehda ===
Following his departure from Adelaide United, Al-Wehda announced the signing of Goodwin on a deal until 2025. Goodwin enjoyed a successful return to the Saudi Pro League in the 2023-24 season, which included goals in his first three matches and a brace against Al-Ettifaq. Injury ruled out Goodwin for the last month of the season as Al-Wehda finished 13th on the ladder.

In another strong start to the season, Goodwin scored a brace and an assist against Al-Riyadh in the opening game of the 2024-25 season. A highlight came during January 2025 against Saudi giants Al-Hilal when Goodwin scored a stunning free-kick goal in the 4–1 loss.

=== Third return to Adelaide United ===
On 28 May 2025 it was announced that Goodwin would return to Adelaide United for a third time, signing a 3 year contract. Goodwin assisted a goal on his competitive return for the club on 17 October 2025 in a 2-1 A-league win against Sydney FC.

== International career ==
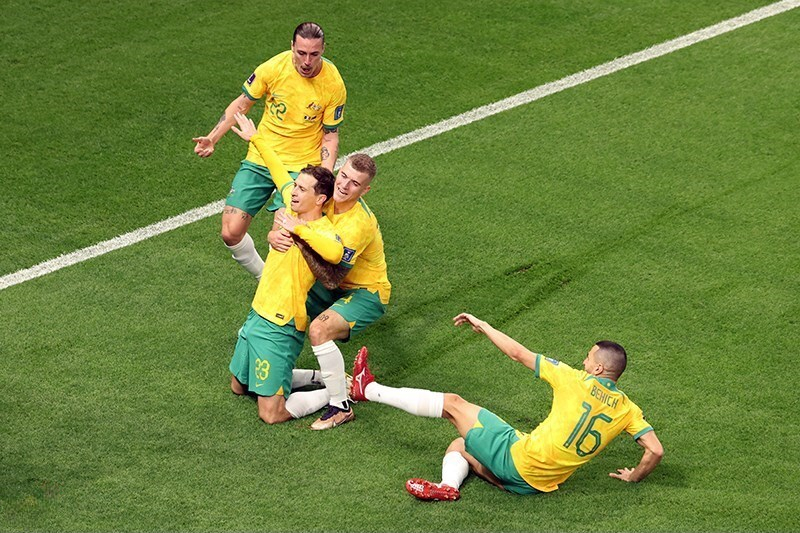
Goodwin celebrating his goal in Australia's group game against France alongside Behich, Irvine, and McGree in the 2022 FIFA World Cup.

On 7 March 2012, Goodwin was selected to represent the Australia Olympic football team in an Asian Olympic Qualifier match against Iraq.

Goodwin made his international debut for Australia on 26 July 2013, coming on as a late substitute in a loss to Japan at the 2013 EAFF East Asian Cup. He started the next match of the tournament, playing a full game in a 4–3 loss to China.

On 27 January 2022, he scored his first international goal against Vietnam in the 2022 FIFA World Cup qualification as Australia won 4–0 in Melbourne.

He was named in Australia's squad for the 2022 FIFA World Cup in November 2022. On 22 November 2022, Goodwin scored his second international goal and Australia's first World Cup goal from open play since the 2014 World Cup, in a 1–4 loss against France. In the last sixteen, his deflected strike, ultimately credited as an Argentine own goal by Enzo Fernández, halved the deficit in a 1–2 loss against eventual champions Argentina in Australia's round of 16 match. Strikes from Julian Alvarez and Lionel Messi stuck the blows against Goodwin's side.

Goodwin was again selected in Graham Arnold's squad for the 2023 AFC Asian Cup in Qatar, which was moved to 2024. Goodwin played a practice match against Bahrain and also played in Australia's opening match of the tournament against India, but was substituted off in both matches since he was carrying a minor injury. Goodwin returned to the field as a substitute in the Round of 16 match against Indonesia and scored a goal and assisted Harry Souttar in an impressive performance off the bench. Goodwin scored the opening goal of the quarter-final against South Korea, but the Socceroos were knocked out of the tournament in extra time. Goodwin's two goals of the tournament equaled the tallies of teammates Jackson Irvine and Martin Boyle and he was rewarded with an exclusive selection in the Team of the Tournament.

Goodwin scored his first international brace against Lebanon in Canberra during the 2026 World Cup qualifiers in March 2024. He then scored from outside the box against China in the third round of qualification, assisted by standing captain Jackson Irvine. The Adelaide Oval match was the first time he had represented the national team in his home town.

== Career statistics ==
=== Club ===
As of match played 26 May 2025

Appearances and goals by club, season and competition
Club	Season	League			National cup (Note: Includes Australia Cup, KNVB Cup, King Cup)		Continental		Total	
Club	Season	Division	Apps	Goals	Apps	Goals	Apps	Goals	Apps	Goals
Melbourne Heart	2011–12	A-League	4	0	–		–		4	0
Newcastle Jets	2012–13	A-League	25	3	–		–		25	3
Newcastle Jets	2013–14	A-League	19	2	1	0	–		20	2
Newcastle Jets	Total		44	5	1	0	–		45	5
Adelaide United	2014–15	A-League	28	6	1	0	–		29	6
Adelaide United	2015–16	A-League	26	4	–		1 (Note: Appearance in AFC Champions League)	0	27	4
Adelaide United	Total		54	10	1	0	1	0	56	10
Sparta Rotterdam	2016–17	Eredivisie	27	4	3	0	–		30	4
Sparta Rotterdam	2017–18	Eredivisie	20	2	1	0	–		21	2
Sparta Rotterdam	Total		47	6	4	0	–		51	6
Adelaide United	2018–19	A-League	29	10	4	5	–		33	15
Al-Wehda	2019–20	Saudi Pro League	29	4	3	0	–		32	4
Abha (loan)	2020–21	Saudi Pro League	16	2	2	0	–		18	2
Adelaide United (loan)	2020–21	A-League	18	8	–		–		18	8
Adelaide United	2021–22	A-League	27	8	–		–		27	8
Adelaide United	2022–23	A-League	28	15	2	1	–		30	16
Adelaide United	Total		55	23	2	1	–		57	24
Al-Wehda	2023–24	Saudi Pro League	22	6	2	0	–		24	6
Al-Wehda	2024–25	Saudi Pro League	28	6	2	0	–		30	6
Al-Wehda	Total		37	11	4	0	–		41	11
Adelaide United	2025–26	A-League	1	1	0	0	–		0	0
Career total			347	81	21	6	1	0	368	86

=== International ===
As of 20 March 2025

Appearances and goals by national team and year
National team	Year	Apps	Goals
Australia	2013	2	0
Australia	2016	1	0
Australia	2019	2	0
Australia	2022	9	2
Australia	2023	6	0
Australia	2024	10	5
Australia	2025	1	0
Total		31	7

List of international goals scored by Craig Goodwin
No.	Date	Venue	Opponent	Score	Result	Competition
1	27 January 2022	Melbourne Rectangular Stadium, Melbourne, Australia	Vietnam	3–0	4–0	2022 FIFA World Cup qualification
2	22 November 2022	Al Janoub Stadium, Al Wakrah, Qatar	France	1–0	1–4	2022 FIFA World Cup
3	28 January 2024	Jassim bin Hamad Stadium, Al Rayyan, Qatar	Indonesia	3–0	4–0	2023 AFC Asian Cup
4	2 February 2024	Al Janoub Stadium, Al Wakrah, Qatar	South Korea	1–0	1–2 (a.e.t.)	2023 AFC Asian Cup
5	26 March 2024	Canberra Stadium, Canberra, Australia	Lebanon	3–0	5–0	2026 FIFA World Cup qualification
6	26 March 2024	Canberra Stadium, Canberra, Australia	Lebanon	5–0	5–0	2026 FIFA World Cup qualification
7	10 October 2024	Adelaide Oval, Adelaide, Australia	China	2–1	3–1	2026 FIFA World Cup qualification

== Honours ==
Adelaide United

- A-League Championship: 2015–16
- A-League Premiership: 2015–16
- FFA Cup: 2018

Individual

- Adelaide United All-time leading goal scorer
- PFA A-League Team of the Season: 2021–22, 2022–23
- Adelaide United Aurelio Vidmar Medalist (Player of the Year) 2015–16, 2021–22 and 2022-23.
- Johnny Warren Medal: 2022–23
- Mark Viduka Medal: 2018
- A-Leagues All Star: 2022
- AFC Asian Cup Team of the Tournament: 2023
