= Dylan Smith (soccer) =

Australian soccer player (born 1996)

Personal information
- Full name: Dylan Smith
- Date of birth: 27 May 1996 (age 30)
- Place of birth: Adelaide, Australia
- Position: Winger

Team information
- Current team: Adelaide Comets

Youth career
- 2014–2015: Adelaide United

Senior career*
Years	Team	Apps	(Gls)
2013	AIS	14	(4)
2014–2016	Adelaide United	1	(0)
2015–2016	Adelaide United NPL	48	(29)
2017	Adelaide City	11	(5)
2018	Sturt Lions	22	(5)
2019–2022	MetroStars	53	(16)
2022–	Adelaide Comets	12	(0)
- * Club domestic league appearances and goals as of 12 September 2022

Dylan Smith (born 27 May 1996) is an Australian professional footballer who plays as a winger for North Eastern MetroStars.

He made his professional debut in the A-league against Melbourne City FC on 25 April 2015.

On 2 October 2018, he was announced to have signed a contract with NPL South Australia side North Eastern MetroStars.
