= Pablo Sánchez (footballer, born 1983) =

Spanish footballer

Personal information
- Full name: Pablo Sánchez Alberto
- Date of birth: 24 January 1983 (age 43)
- Place of birth: Cádiz, Spain
- Height: 1.73 m (5 ft 8 in)
- Position: Winger

Youth career
- Cádiz

Senior career*
Years	Team	Apps	(Gls)
2002–2004	Cádiz B	68	(45)
2003–2006	Cádiz	4	(1)
2004–2006	→ Sevilla B (loan)	46	(9)
2006–2008	Sevilla B	71	(8)
2008–2009	Las Palmas	38	(6)
2009–2012	Recreativo	93	(17)
2012–2013	Cádiz	35	(6)
2013–2014	Lugo	42	(5)
2014–2016	Adelaide United	51	(17)
2016–2018	Llagostera	51	(8)
2018–2019	San Fernando	37	(3)
Total		536	(125)
- * Club domestic league appearances and goals

Pablo Sánchez Alberto (born 24 January 1983) is a Spanish former professional footballer who played as a left winger.

He amassed Segunda División totals of 215 matches and 34 goals over seven seasons, mainly in service of Recreativo (three years). He played top-flight football in Australia with Adelaide United, winning the A-League in 2016.

== Club career ==
Born in Cádiz, Andalusia, Sánchez started playing football with local Cádiz CF, making his professional debut on 20 December 2003 by coming on as a 76th-minute substitute in a 4–1 home win against CD Tenerife in the Segunda División; he spent the vast majority of his spell associated with the reserves, however, scoring 45 goals in the 2003–04 season to see them promote to Tercera División after six years.

From 2004 to 2008, Sánchez represented Sevilla Atlético, the first two years on loan. In the 2006–07 campaign, he contributed 37 games and four goals – playoffs included – to help the side to reach the second division for the first time in 44 years.

After helping Sevilla B retain their league status, Sánchez continued competing in that tier the following seasons, with UD Las Palmas and Recreativo de Huelva. In 2011–12, he scored a career-best eight goals as the latter team ranked 17th and narrowly avoided relegation.

Sánchez rejoined Cádiz for the 2012–13 campaign, with the club now in the Segunda División B. He returned to division two in the subsequent off-season with CD Lugo and, at already 31, moved abroad for the first time in his career after signing with Adelaide United FC in the A-League, where he shared teams with several compatriots including manager Josep Gombau.

On 1 May 2016, shortly after having replaced Marcelo Carrusca in the 86th minute, Sánchez completed a 3–1 victory over Western Sydney Wanderers FC in the A-League Grand Final, through a skillful finish. Six days later, he was released.

== Honours ==
Sevilla B

- Segunda División B: 2006–07

Adelaide United

- A-League Championship: 2016
- A-League Premiership: 2015–16
- FFA Cup: 2014
