= Mark Ochieng =

Kenyan-Australian footballer (born 1996)

Personal information
- Full name: Mark Clint Odhiambo Ochieng
- Date of birth: 9 December 1996 (age 29)
- Place of birth: Nairobi, Kenya
- Height: 1.73 m (5 ft 8 in)
- Positions: Right back; winger

Team information
- Current team: Hume City

Youth career
- West Torrens Birkalla
- 2011–2012: FFSA NTC
- 2014–2018: Adelaide United

Senior career*
Years	Team	Apps	(Gls)
2013	AIS	14	(1)
2014–2018	Adelaide United	22	(1)
2015–2018	Adelaide United NPL	45	(3)
2018	Adelaide Comets	9	(0)
2019	Dandenong City	10	(0)
2019–2020	Hume City	18	(1)
2020	Adelaide Olympic	8	(1)
2021–	Hume City	90	(2)

International career^{‡}
2012	Australia U17	2	(0)
- * Club domestic league appearances and goals as of 12 September 2024 ‡ National team caps and goals as of 22 September 2012

Mark Ochieng is a Kenyan-Australian professional footballer who plays as a right back for Hume City in the National Premier Leagues Victoria.

== Early life ==
Ochieng's father played international football for Kenya. After growing up in Nairobi, the family moved to Plympton, South Australia when Ochieng was nine, where his father worked as an electrician.

== Club career ==
=== Adelaide United ===
He made his senior professional debut for Adelaide United FC in the 2014 FFA Cup in a match against Wellington Phoenix FC at the Marden Sports Complex on 5 August 2014. Adelaide won the match 1–0 in regulation time.

On 12 January 2017, Ochieng scored his first goal for Adelaide against Melbourne City, the 87th-minute strike helping Adelaide United to just their second win of the season.

Ochieng was released by Adelaide United in May 2018.
