= John Hall (footballer, born 1994) =

Australian soccer player

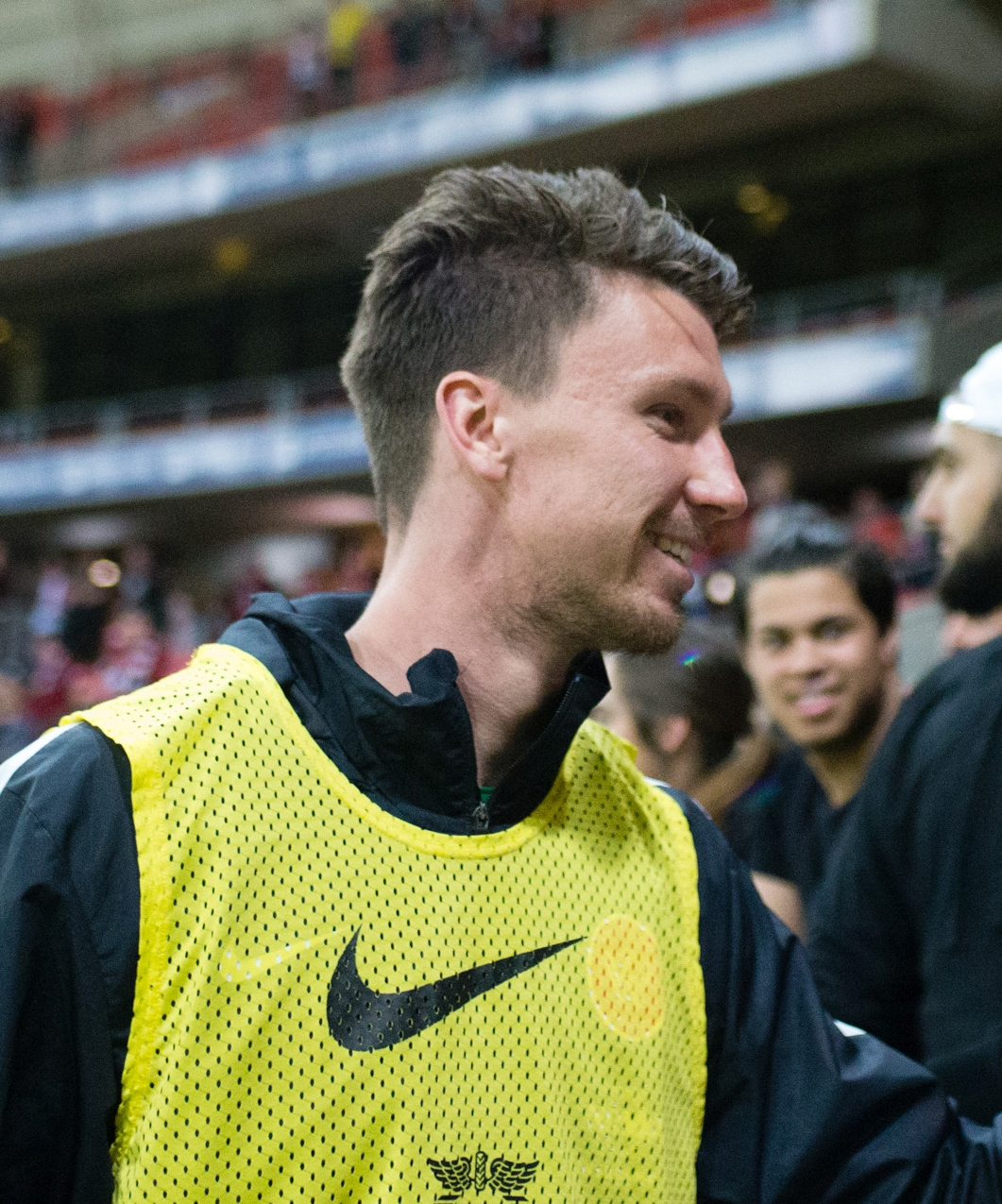
- Hall with Western Sydney Wanderers in 2017

Personal information
- Full name: John David Sinclair Hall
- Date of birth: 23 October 1994 (age 32)
- Place of birth: Adelaide, Australia
- Height: 1.95 m (6 ft 5 in)
- Position: Goalkeeper

Team information
- Current team: Adelaide City

Youth career
- Mount Barker United
- –2011: Cumberland United
- 2011–2014: Adelaide United

Senior career*
Years	Team	Apps	(Gls)
2011–2013	Cumberland United	27	(0)
2012–2017	Adelaide United	10	(0)
2017–2018	Western Sydney Wanderers	0	(0)
2018	Sydney United 58	3	(0)
2018–2022	Croydon Kings	86	(0)
2023–2024	Dandenong City	52	(0)
2025–	Adelaide City	24	(0)

International career^{‡}
2014–2015	Australia U-23	3	(0)
- * Club domestic league appearances and goals as of 28 January 2026 ‡ National team caps and goals as of 24 January 2015

John David Sinclair Hall (born 23 October 1994) is an Australian professional footballer who plays as a goalkeeper for Adelaide City in the National Premier Leagues South Australia.

== Early-life ==
Hall grew up in Adelaide, South Australia where he attended Prince Alfred College.

== Club career ==
=== Adelaide United ===
Hall signed for Adelaide United in 2012.

In the 2014–15 A-League season, he made his senior debut against the Newcastle Jets replacing Paul Izzo in the 59th minute in a 7–0 victory.

At the start of the 2015–16 A-League season, Hall replaced Eugene Galekovic due to Socceroos duty and later a knee injury.

In August 2015, Hall signed a two-year contract extension with Adelaide.

=== Western Sydney Wanderers ===
On 22 May 2017, Hall signed with the Western Sydney Wanderers as a replacement for the injured Jerrad Tyson. In January 2018, Hall departed Western Sydney Wanderers following the conclusion of his contract and Tyson returning to full fitness.

== Honors ==
Adelaide United

- A-League Premiership: 2015/16
- FFA Cup: 2014
