= 2014–15 Melbourne City FC season =

Melbourne City
2014–15 season
- Chairman: Khaldoon Al Mubarak
- Manager: John van 't Schip
- Stadium: AAMI Park, Melbourne
- A-League: 5th
- A-League Finals Series: Semi-finals
- FFA Cup: Round of 32
- Top goalscorer: League: Aaron Mooy (7); All: Aaron Mooy (7)
- Highest home attendance: 26,372 vs Melbourne Victory; 20 December 2014
- Lowest home attendance: 5,867 vs Newcastle Jets; 14 March 2015
Home colours	Away colours

The 2014–15 Melbourne City FC season was the club's fifth season since its establishment in 2009, and its first season under the "Melbourne City" moniker, after being taken over and rebranded by Manchester City. The club participated in the A-League for the fifth time and the FFA Cup for the first time.

== Players ==
=== Squad information ===
N	Pos.	Nat.	Name	Age	Since	App	Goals	Ends	Transfer fee	Notes
1	GK	(Australia)	Andrew Redmayne	37	2012	48	0	2016	Free	
3	DF	(Netherlands)	Rob Wielaert	47	2013	37	1	2015	Free	Visa player
4	DF	(Australia)	Connor Chapman	32	2014	16	0	2016	Free	
5	MF	(Australia)	Erik Paartalu	40	2014	26	3	2018	Free	
6	MF	(Australia)	Aaron Mooy	36	2014	27	7	2016	Free	
7	MF	(Australia)	Iain Ramsay	38	2013	45	3	2015	Free	
8	MF	(Australia)	Massimo Murdocca	42	2013	44	0	2015	Free	
9	FW	(Martinique)	Harry Novillo	34	2015	8	3	2015		Injury Replacement Player
10	MF	(Slovenia)	Robert Koren	46	2014	18	3	2016		Visa player/International Marquee
11	MF	(Republic of Ireland)	Damien Duff	47	2014	15	1	2015	Free	Visa player
13	MF	(Argentina)	Jonatan Germano	38	2011	52	7	2015	Free	Visa player
14	MF	(Australia)	James Brown	36	2014	14	1	2016	Free	
15	FW	(Australia)	David Williams	38	2011	91	21	2016	Free	
16	FW	(Australia)	Joshua Kennedy	44	2015	12	2	2016	Free	
17	MF	(Australia)	Jason Hoffman	37	2010	80	3	2016	Free	
18	MF	(Australia)	Paulo Retre	33	2014	6	0	2015	Youth system	
19	MF	(Australia)	Ben Garuccio	31	2012	24	0	2017	Free	
20	GK	(Australia)	Tando Velaphi	39	2013	8	0	2015	Free	
21	MF	(Australia)	Stefan Mauk	31	2012	24	0	2016	Youth system	
22	DF	(Australia)	Jack Clisby	34	2015	11	0	2016	Free	
23	FW	(Australia)	Mate Dugandzic	37	2011	75	13	2015	Free	
24	DF	(Australia)	Patrick Kisnorbo	45	2013	50	3	2015	Free	Captain
25	MF	(Australia)	Jacob Melling	31	2014	13	1	2016	Free	
26	FW	(Australia)	Marc Marino	30	2014	4	1	2016	Free	
27	DF	(Netherlands)	Kew Jaliens	48	2015	11	1	2015	Free	Injury Replacement Player
Players no longer at the club:
9	FW	(Spain)	David Villa	44	2014	4	2	2014	Free	Guest player
22	MF	(Australia)	Nick Kalmar	39	2010	69	6	2015	Free	
28	MF	(Republic of Ireland)	Liam Miller	45	2014	2	0	2014	Free	Injury Replacement Player
29	DF	(Singapore)	Safuwan Baharudin	35	2015	6	2	2015	Free	Visa player

- Last updated: 7 October 2015

=== From youth squad ===
N	Pos.	Nat.	Name	Age	Notes
18	MF	(Australia)	Paulo Retre	33	
26	DF	(Australia)	Ersin Kaya	33	
27	MF	(Australia)	Luke O'Dea	33	
28	DF	(Australia)	Nick Symeoy		
30	MF	(Australia)	Ross Archibald	32	

=== Transfers in ===
No.	Pos.	Nat.	Name	Age	Moving from	Type	Transfer window	Ends	Transfer fee	Source
4	DF	(Australia)	Connor Chapman	32	Newcastle Jets	Transfer	Pre-season	2016	Free	
14	MF	(Australia)	James Brown	36	Newcastle Jets	Transfer	Pre-season	2016	Free	
6	MF	(Australia)	Aaron Mooy	36	Western Sydney Wanderers	Transfer	Pre-season	2016	Free	
9	FW	(Spain)	David Villa	44	New York City (United States)	Loan (Guest)	Pre-season	2015	Free	
11	MF	(Republic of Ireland)	Damien Duff	47	Fulham (England)	Transfer	Pre-season	2015	Free	
25	MF	(Australia)	Jacob Melling	31	Adelaide United	Transfer	Pre-season	2016	Free	
10	MF	(Slovenia)	Robert Koren	46	Hull City (England)	Transfer	Pre-season	2016	Free	
26	FW	(Australia)	Marc Marino	30	Australian Institute of Sport	Transfer	Pre-season	2016	Free	
5	MF	(Australia)	Erik Paartalu	40	Muangthong United (Thailand)	Transfer	Pre-season	2018		
28	MF	(Republic of Ireland)	Liam Miller	45	Brisbane Roar	Transfer	Mid-season	2014		
16	FW	(Australia)	Joshua Kennedy	44	Nagoya Grampus (Japan)	Transfer	Mid-season	2016		
22	DF	(Australia)	Jack Clisby	34	Perth Glory	Transfer	Mid-season	2016		
29	DF	(Singapore)	Safuwan Baharudin	35	LionsXII (Singapore)	Loan	Mid-season	2015		
27	DF	(Netherlands)	Kew Jaliens	48	Newcastle Jets	Transfer	Mid-season	2015		
9	FW	(Martinique)	Harry Novillo	34	Clermont (France)	Transfer	Mid-season	2015		

=== Transfers out ===
No.	Pos.	Nat.	Name	Age	Moving to	Type	Transfer window	Transfer fee	Source
2	DF	(Australia)	Jeremy Walker	33	Hume City	End of contract	Pre-season	Free	
4	MF	(Netherlands)	Orlando Engelaar	47		End of contract	Pre-season	Free	
5	DF	(Australia)	Sam Mitchinson	34	Bayswater City	End of contract	Pre-season	Free	
6	DF	(Liberia)	Patrick Gerhardt	41		End of contract	Pre-season	Free	
10	MF	(Australia)	Harry Kewell	48		Retired	Pre-season	Free	
16	DF	(Australia)	Aziz Behich	35	Bursaspor (Turkey)	End of loan	Pre-season	Free	
18	DF	(Australia)	David Vranković	33	Bonnyrigg White Eagles	Transfer	Pre-season	Free	
9	FW	(Spain)	David Villa	44	New York City (United States)	End of loan	Mid-season	Free	
22	MF	(Australia)	Nick Kalmar	39	Western Sydney Wanderers	Transfer	Mid-season	Free	
22	MF	(Republic of Ireland)	Liam Miller	45	Cork City (Republic of Ireland)	End of contract	Mid-season	Free	
29	DF	(Singapore)	Safuwan Baharudin	23	LionsXII (Singapore)	End of Loan	Mid-season	Free	

== Technical staff ==
Position	Name
Head coach	(Netherlands) John van 't Schip
Senior Assistant Coach	(Australia) Luciano Trani
Assistant coaches	(Croatia) Joey Didulica
Assistant coaches	(Croatia) Ivan Jolic
Head of Performance
Head of Performance	(Italy) Simone Ripamonti
Goalkeeping coach	(Australia) Clint Bolton
Physiotherapist	(Australia) Belinda Pacella
Youth Team Coach	(Australia) Joe Palatsides

== Statistics ==
=== Squad statistics ===
N	Pos.	Nat.	Name	Total					A-League					FFA Cup
N	Pos.	Nat.	Name	Apps	Goals	Yellow card	Second yellow card	Red card	Apps	Goals	Yellow card	Second yellow card	Red card	Apps	Goals	Yellow card	Second yellow card	Red card
1	GK	(Australia)	Andrew Redmayne	12	0	1	0	0	10+1	0	1	0	0	1	0	0	0	0
3	DF	(Netherlands)	Rob Wielaert	12	1	2	0	0	11	1	2	0	0	1	0	0	0	0
4	DF	(Australia)	Connor Chapman	16	0	4	0	1	16	0	4	0	1	0	0	0	0	0
5	MF	(Australia)	Erik Paartalu	26	3	4	0	0	26	3	4	0	0	0	0	0	0	0
6	MF	(Australia)	Aaron Mooy	28	7	5	0	0	27	7	4	0	0	1	0	1	0	0
7	MF	(Australia)	Iain Ramsay	20	2	2	0	0	11+8	2	1	0	0	1	0	1	0	0
8	MF	(Australia)	Massimo Murdocca	17	0	0	0	0	7+9	0	0	0	0	1	0	0	0	0
9	FW	(Martinique)	Harry Novillo	10	2	2	0	0	8+2	2	2	0	0	0	0	0	0	0
10	MF	(Slovenia)	Robert Koren	20	3	1	0	0	18+2	3	1	0	0	0	0	0	0	0
11	MF	(Republic of Ireland)	Damien Duff	16	1	3	0	0	14+1	1	3	0	0	1	0	0	0	0
13	MF	(Argentina)	Jonatan Germano	11	1	0	0	0	10+1	1	0	0	0	0	0	0	0	0
14	FW	(Australia)	James Brown	16	1	3	0	0	5+10	1	2	0	0	0+1	0	1	0	0
15	FW	(Australia)	David Williams	27	3	0	0	0	14+12	3	0	0	0	1	0	0	0	0
16	FW	(Australia)	Joshua Kennedy	12	2	0	0	0	11+1	2	0	0	0	0	0	0	0	0
17	MF	(Australia)	Jason Hoffman	15	1	5	0	1	11+3	1	5	0	0	1	0	0	0	1
18	MF	(Australia)	Paulo Retre	14	0	2	1	0	7+7	0	2	1	0	0	0	0	0	0
19	MF	(Australia)	Ben Garuccio	8	0	1	0	0	6+1	0	1	0	0	0+1	0	0	0	0
20	GK	(Australia)	Tando Velaphi	19	0	1	0	1	19	0	1	0	1	0	0	0	0	0
21	MF	(Australia)	Stefan Mauk	6	0	0	0	0	0+5	0	0	0	0	0+1	0	0	0	0
22	DF	(Australia)	Jack Clisby	11	0	4	0	0	9+2	0	4	0	0	0	0	0	0	0
23	FW	(Australia)	Mate Dugandzic	20	2	1	0	0	15+4	2	1	0	0	1	0	0	0	0
24	DF	(Australia)	Patrick Kisnorbo	30	1	3	0	0	29	1	3	0	0	1	0	0	0	0
25	MF	(Australia)	Jacob Melling	14	1	8	0	0	10+4	1	8	0	0	0	0	0	0	0
26	FW	(Australia)	Marc Marino	5	1	0	0	0	0+5	1	0	0	0	0	0	0	0	0
27	MF	(Netherlands)	Kew Jaliens	11	1	4	0	1	11	1	4	0	1	0	0	0	0	0
28	DF	(Australia)	Nick Symeoy	2	0	0	0	0	0+2	0	0	0	0	0	0	0	0	0
30	MF	(Australia)	Ross Archibald	3	0	0	0	0	3	0	0	0	0	0	0	0	0	0
Players no longer at the club:
9	FW	(Spain)	David Villa	4	2	0	0	0	3+1	2	0	0	0	0	0	0	0	0
22	MF	(Australia)	Nick Kalmar	1	1	0	0	0	0	0	0	0	0	1	1	0	0	0
28	MF	(Republic of Ireland)	Liam Miller	2	0	0	0	0	2	0	0	0	0	0	0	0	0	0
29	DF	(Singapore)	Safuwan Baharudin	6	2	4	0	0	6	2	4	0	0	0	0	0	0	0

- Last updated: 8 May 2015
- Source: au.soccerway.com
- (yellow card) = Number of bookings; (second yellow card) = Number of sending offs after a second yellow card; (red card) = Number of sending offs by a direct red card.

== Pre-season and mid-season friendlies ==
18 June 2014	Melbourne City	7–0	Whittlesea Ranges	Melbourne, Victoria, Australia
				Stadium: Epping Stadium; Attendance: 0 (Behind closed doors)

25 June 2014	Ballarat Red Devils	0–6	Melbourne City	Ballarat, Victoria, Australia
19:00 AEST (UTC+10:00)		Report	Dugandžić 6', 11'; Wielaert 35'; Williams 37'; Konstantinidis 68'; Brown 81'	Stadium: Morshead Park; Attendance: 1200

15 June 2014 Manchester Training Camp	Bury (England)	2–2	(Australia) Melbourne City	Carrington, Greater Manchester, England
12:00 BST (UTC+01:00)	Mills (?); Jones (?)	MCFC report BFC Report	Brown 11'; Poole (trialist) (?)	Stadium: Carrington Training Centre; Attendance: 0 (Behind closed doors)

19 July 2014 Manchester Training Camp	Oldham Athletic (England)	1–1	(Australia) Melbourne City	Oldham, Greater Manchester, England
15:00 BST (UTC+01:00)	Llera 85'	Report	Williams 48'	Stadium: SportsDirect.com Park; Attendance: 1039

23 July 2014 Manchester Training Camp	Bolton Wanderers (England)	1–5	(Australia) Melbourne City	Leyland, Lancashire, England
19:30 BST (UTC+01:00)	Wilkinson 3'	Report	Kisnorbo 20'; Williams 27'; Mooy 35'; Brown 63'; Dugandžić 73'	Stadium: County Ground

19 August 2014	Hume City	0–5	Melbourne City	Broadmeadows, Victoria, Australia
19:30 AEST (UTC+10:00)		Report	Williams 24'; Kisnorbo 43'; Marino 58'; Mauk 60'; Zinni 80'	Stadium: John Ilhan Memorial Reserve

23 August 2014	Adelaide United	1–0	Melbourne City	Alice Springs, Northern Territory, Australia
15:00 ACST (UTC+09:30)	Cirio 3'	Report		Stadium: Anzac Oval; Attendance: 1,550; Referee: Lucien Laverdure

2 September 2014	FC Bendigo	0–4	Melbourne City	Huntly, Victoria, Australia
18:30 AEST (UTC+10:00)		Report	Marino 13', 54'; Prelevic 85'; Dekker 90'	Stadium: Epsom Reserve

7 September 2014 Craig Foster Cup	Melbourne City	1–1	Central Coast Mariners	Lismore, New South Wales, Australia
14:30 AEST (UTC+10:00)	Wielaert 56'	Report	Mané 57' (pen.)	Stadium: Oakes Oval; Attendance: 4,000; Referee: Jarred Gillett

16 September 2014	Adelaide United	2–0	Melbourne City	Adelaide, South Australia, Australia
15:00 ACST (UTC+09:30)	Mabil 33'; Goodwin 45'	Report		Stadium: Coopers Stadium; Attendance: 0 (Behind closed doors); Referee: Daniel Goodwin

23 September 2014	Melbourne City	1–0	Pascoe Vale	Melbourne, Victoria, Australia
19:00 AEST (UTC+10:00)	Retre 45+1'	Report		Stadium: Epping Stadium; Attendance: 2,000

26 September 2014	Melbourne City	2–1	Perth Glory	Melbourne, Victoria, Australia
	Koren 15' (pen.); Dugandzic 62'	Report	Maclaren 88'	Stadium: AAMI Park; Attendance: 0 (Behind closed doors)

11 January 2015 Abu Dhabi training camp	Al Jazira FC (United Arab Emirates)	2–0	(Australia) Melbourne City	Abu Dhabi, United Arab Emirates
19:00 UAEST (UTC+04:00)	Vučinić 58'; Kisnorbo 73' (o.g.)	Report		Stadium: Mohammed Bin Zayed Stadium

18 January 2015 Abu Dhabi training camp	Melbourne City (Australia)	1–1	(Ukraine) Dnipro Dnipropetrovsk	Abu Dhabi, United Arab Emirates
19:00 UAEST (UTC+04:00)	Williams 75'	Report	Zozulya 17'	Stadium: New York University Abu Dhabi Campus

== Competitions ==
=== Overall ===
Competition	Started round	Final position / round	First match	Last match
A-League	—	5th	11 October 2014	25 April 2015
A-League Finals	Elimination-finals	Semi-finals	3 May 2015	8 May 2015
FFA Cup	Round of 32	Round of 32	12 August 2014	12 August 2014

=== A-League ===
==== League table ====
Pos	Team	Pld	W	D	L	GF	GA	GD	Pts	Qualification
1	Melbourne Victory (C)	27	15	8	4	56	31	+25	53	Qualification for 2016 AFC Champions League group stage and Finals series
2	Sydney FC	27	14	8	5	52	35	+17	50	Qualification for 2016 AFC Champions League group stage and Finals series
3	Adelaide United	27	14	4	9	47	32	+15	46	Qualification for 2016 AFC Champions League qualifying play-off and Finals series
4	Wellington Phoenix (Note: Wellington Phoenix cannot qualify for the AFC Champions League as they are not recognised as an AFC club.)	27	14	4	9	45	35	+10	46	Qualification for Finals series
5	Melbourne City	27	9	8	10	36	41	−5	35	Qualification for Finals series
6	Brisbane Roar	27	10	4	13	42	43	−1	34	Qualification for Finals series
7	Perth Glory (Note: Perth Glory disqualified from the Finals series and given a compulsory 7th-place finish due to salary cap violations.)	27	14	8	5	45	35	+10	50	
8	Central Coast Mariners	27	5	8	14	26	50	−24	23	
9	Western Sydney Wanderers	27	4	6	17	29	44	−15	18	
10	Newcastle Jets	27	3	8	16	23	55	−32	17	

Source: A-League
Rules for classification: 1) points; 2) goal difference; 3) number of goals scored.
(C) Champions

==== Results summary ====
Overall								Home						Away					
Pld	W	D	L	GF	GA	GD	Pts	W	D	L	GF	GA	GD	W	D	L	GF	GA	GD
27	9	8	10	36	41	−5	35	6	5	2	18	10	+8	3	3	8	18	31	−13

Last updated: 25 April 2015.
Source: ultimatealeague.com

==== Results by round ====
Round	1	2	3	4	5	6	7	8	9	10	11	12	13	14	15	16	17	18	19	20	21	22	23	24	25	26	27
Ground	A	H	A	H	A	H	H	A	H	H	H	A	A	H	A	A	H	H	A	A	H	A	H	A	H	A	A
Result	D	D	L	L	W	D	L	L	W	L	W	D	W	L	W	L	D	D	W	L	W	W	W	D	D	L	L
Position	5	7	7	7	6	6	6	7	6	7	6	6	6	6	6	6	7	7	6	7	6	6	6	6	6	6	5

Updated to match(es) played on 25 April 2015. Source: ultimatealeague.com
A = Away; H = Home; W = Win; D = Draw; L = Loss

==== Matches ====
11 October 2014 1	Sydney FC	1–1	Melbourne City	Sydney
19:00 AEDT (UTC+11:00)	Gameiro 54'	Report	Villa 63'	Stadium: Allianz Stadium; Attendance: 25,525; Referee: Peter Green

19 October 2014 2	Melbourne City	1–1	Newcastle Jets	Melbourne
15:00 AEDT (UTC+11:00)	Villa 87'	Report	Montaño 62'	Stadium: AAMI Park; Attendance: 15,717; Referee: Jarred Gillett

25 October 2014 3	Melbourne Victory	5–2	Melbourne City	Melbourne
19:30 AEDT (UTC+11:00)	Thompson 23', 87'; Berisha 45+1', 46', 67' (pen.)	Report	Wielaert 13'; Hoffman 26'	Stadium: Etihad Stadium; Attendance: 43,729; Referee: Strebre Delovski

31 October 2014 4	Melbourne City	1–2	Adelaide United	Melbourne
19:40 AEDT (UTC+11:00)	Kisnorbo 9'	Report	Djite 38'; Carrusca 80' (pen.)	Stadium: AAMI Park; Attendance: 13,083; Referee: Chris Beath

8 November 2014 5	Brisbane Roar	1–3	Melbourne City	Brisbane
19:30 AEDT (UTC+11:00)	Borrello 67'	Report	Williams 8'; Dugandzic 10'; Marino 83'	Stadium: Suncorp Stadium; Attendance: 17,131; Referee: Kris Griffiths-Jones

16 November 2014 6	Melbourne City	2–2	Central Coast Mariners	Melbourne
17:00 AEDT (UTC+11:00)	Dugandzic 10'; Paartalu 53'	Report	G. Trifiro 80'; Hutchinson 90+4'	Stadium: AAMI Park; Attendance: 9,402; Referee: Adam Fielding

22 November 2014 7	Melbourne City	1–2	Sydney FC	Melbourne
19:30 AEDT (UTC+11:00)	Paartalu 88'	Report	Janko 10', 83'; Dimitrijević (yellow card) 70' (yellow-red card) 89'	Stadium: AAMI Park; Attendance: 9,474; Referee: Kris Griffiths-Jones

30 November 2014 8	Wellington Phoenix	5–1	Melbourne City	Wellington
17:00 AEDT (UTC+11:00)	Burns 34', 47', 85' (pen.); Bonevacia 40'; Krishna 50'	Report	Williams 68' (pen.)	Stadium: Westpac Stadium; Attendance: 7,410; Referee: Jarred Gillett

7 December 2014 9	Melbourne City	1–0	Brisbane Roar	Melbourne
17:00 AEDT (UTC+11:00)	Mooy 49' (pen.)	Report		Stadium: AAMI Park; Attendance: 7,721; Referee: Shaun Evans

20 December 2014 11	Melbourne City	1–0	Melbourne Victory	Melbourne
19:30 AEDT (UTC+11:00)	Paartalu 90+1'	Report		Stadium: AAMI Park; Attendance: 26,372; Referee: Kris Griffiths-Jones

26 December 2014 12	Melbourne City	1–1	Perth Glory	Melbourne
19:00 AEDT (UTC+11:00)	Mooy 47'	Report	Garcia 62'	Stadium: AAMI Park; Attendance: 9,950; Referee: Alan Milliner

30 December 2014 13	Newcastle Jets	2–5	Melbourne City	Newcastle
17:00 AEDT (UTC+11:00)	Montaño 71'; Jerónimo 79'	Report	Mooy 4' (pen.); Koren 9', 63', 74'; Duff 24'	Stadium: Hunter Stadium; Attendance: 9,935; Referee: Stephen Lucas

4 January 2015 14	Central Coast Mariners	2–0	Melbourne City	Gosford
17:00 AEDT (UTC+11:00)	Duke 12', 27'	Report	Velaphi (red card) 58'	Stadium: Central Coast Stadium; Attendance: 7,409; Referee: Peter Green

1 February 2015 15	Melbourne City	2–1	Western Sydney Wanderers	Melbourne
17:00 AEDT (UTC+11:00)	Melling 24'; Mooy 73'	Report	Takahagi 5'	Stadium: AAMI Park; Attendance: 7,561; Referee: Kris Griffiths-Jones

7 February 2015 16	Melbourne Victory	3–0	Melbourne City	Melbourne
19:30 AEDT (UTC+11:00)	Berisha 10'; Barbarouses 53'; Ben Khalfallah 62'	Report		Stadium: Etihad Stadium; Attendance: 40,042; Referee: Peter Green

14 February 2015 17	Wellington Phoenix	0–0	Melbourne City	Lower Hutt
17:00 AEDT (UTC+11:00)		Report		Stadium: Hutt Recreation Ground; Attendance: 9,232; Referee: Chris Beath

22 February 2015 18	Melbourne City	0–0	Perth Glory	Melbourne
17:00 AEDT (UTC+11:00)		Report		Stadium: AAMI Park; Attendance: 6,486; Referee: Jarred Gillett

27 February 2015 19	Melbourne City	3–1	Adelaide United	Melbourne
19:40 AEDT (UTC+11:00)	Safuwan 52'; Kennedy 55'; Ramsay 87'	Report	Sánchez 32'	Stadium: AAMI Park; Attendance: 7,345; Referee: Alan Milliner

8 March 2015 20	Central Coast Mariners	1–0	Melbourne City	Gosford
15:00 AEDT (UTC+11:00)	F. Ferreira 74'	Report		Stadium: Central Coast Stadium; Attendance: 6,079; Referee: Jarred Gillett

11 March 2015; Rescheduled 10	Western Sydney Wanderers	3–2	Melbourne City	Sydney
20:30 AEDT (UTC+11:00)	Poljak 38'; Juric 79' (pen.); Rukavytsya 90+1'	Report	Safuwan 28'; Mooy 72'; Chapman (red card) 82'	Stadium: Pirtek Stadium; Attendance: 7,239; Referee: Strebre Delovski

14 March 2015 21	Melbourne City	4–0	Newcastle Jets	Melbourne
19:30 AEDT (UTC+11:00)	Jaliens 18'; Novillo 47'; Williams 63'; Ramsay 88'	Report		Stadium: AAMI Park; Attendance: 5,867; Referee: Peter Green

20 March 2015 22	Sydney FC	0–1	Melbourne City	Sydney
19:40 AEDT (UTC+11:00)		Report	J. Brown 81'	Stadium: Allianz Stadium; Attendance: 11,638; Referee: Chris Beath

28 March 2015 23	Melbourne City	1–0	Brisbane Roar	Melbourne
19:30 AEDT (UTC+11:00)	Germano 5'	Report		Stadium: AAMI Park; Attendance: 9,561; Referee: Kris Griffiths-Jones

3 April 2015 24	Western Sydney Wanderers	1–1	Melbourne City	Sydney
19:40 AEDT (UTC+11:00)	Takahagi 20'	Report	Novillo 39'	Stadium: Pirtek Stadium; Attendance: 9,054; Referee: Jarred Gillett

12 April 2015 25	Melbourne City	0–0	Wellington Phoenix	Melbourne
17:00 AEST (UTC+10:00)		Report		Stadium: AAMI Park; Attendance: 6,720; Referee: Peter Green

19 April 2015 26	Perth Glory	3–1	Melbourne City	Perth
15:00 AEST (UTC+10:00)	Maclaren 42', 65', 87'	Report	Retre (yellow card) 44' (yellow-red card) 45+1'; Mooy 52'	Stadium: nib Stadium; Attendance: 5,821; Referee: Chris Beath

25 April 2015 27	Adelaide United	4–1	Melbourne City	Adelaide
19:00 ACST (UTC+09:30)	Palanca 19'; Sánchez 23'; Elrich 33'; Watson 59' (pen.); Marrone (red card) 70'	Report	Mooy 65' (pen.); Jaliens (red card) 66'	Stadium: Coopers Stadium; Attendance: 8,773; Referee: Kris Griffiths-Jones

==== Finals series ====
3 May 2015 Elimination-finals	Wellington Phoenix	0–2	Melbourne City	Wellington
19:00 NZST (UTC+12:00)		Report	Kennedy 61'; Moss 72' (o.g.)	Stadium: Westpac Stadium; Attendance: 10,171; Referee: Ben Williams

8 May 2015 Semi-finals	Melbourne Victory	3–0	Melbourne City	Melbourne
19:30 AEST (UTC+10:00)	Berisha 18'; Barbarouses 30'; Thompson 87'	Report		Stadium: Etihad Stadium; Attendance: 50,873; Referee: Kris Griffiths-Jones

=== FFA Cup ===
12 August 2014 Round of 32	Melbourne City (Victoria (state))	1–3 (a.e.t.)	(New South Wales) Sydney FC	Ballarat
19:30 AEST	Kalmar 64'; Hoffman (red card) 108'	Report	Gameiro 23'; Abbas 111' (pen.), 115' (pen.)	Stadium: Morshead Park Stadium; Attendance: 2,801; Referee: Shaun Evans

== Awards ==
- NAB Young Footballer of the Month (February) – Connor Chapman
