= 2015–16 Melbourne City FC season =

Melbourne City
2015–16 season
- Owner: City Football Group
- Chairman: Khaldoon Al Mubarak
- Manager: John van 't Schip
- Stadium: AAMI Park
- A-League: 4th
- A-League Finals: Semi-finals
- FFA Cup: Semi-finals
- Top goalscorer: League: Bruno Fornaroli (23); All: Bruno Fornaroli (28)
- Highest home attendance: 25,738 vs. Melbourne Victory (13 February 2016); A-League
- Lowest home attendance: 4,027 vs. Wellington Phoenix (27 November 2015); FFA Cup
- Average home league attendance: 11,061
- Biggest win: 5–0; Heidelberg United (29 September 2015); FFA Cup
- Biggest defeat: 0–3; Western Sydney Wanderers (13 November 2015); A-League; 1–4; Adelaide United (13 November 2015); A-League Finals
Home colours	Away colours

The 2015–16 season was the sixth in the history of Melbourne City Football Club. In addition to the domestic league, the club participated in the FFA Cup for the second time.

== Players ==
=== Squad information ===
As of 5 February 2016

Note: Flags indicate national team as defined under FIFA eligibility rules; some limited exceptions apply. Players may hold more than one non-FIFA nationality.

No.	Pos.	Nation	Player
1	GK	DEN	Thomas Sørensen
2	DF	AUS	Alex Wilkinson
3	DF	NIR	Aaron Hughes
4	DF	AUS	Connor Chapman
5	DF	AUS	Ivan Franjic
7	FW	AUS	Corey Gameiro
8	MF	AUS	Aaron Mooy
9	FW	MTQ	Harry Novillo
11	DF	AUS	Michael Zullo
14	MF	AUS	James Brown
16	MF	AUS	Jason Trifiro
17	FW	SRI	Wade Dekker

No.	Pos.	Nation	Player
18	MF	AUS	Paulo Retre
19	MF	AUS	Ben Garuccio
20	GK	AUS	Dean Bouzanis
22	DF	AUS	Jack Clisby
23	FW	URU	Bruno Fornaroli
24	DF	AUS	Patrick Kisnorbo (Captain)
25	MF	AUS	Jacob Melling
26	FW	AUS	Marc Marino
27	MF	AUS	Nick Fitzgerald
28	FW	AUS	Steve Kuzmanovski
29	MF	AUS	Anthony Cáceres (On Loan from Manchester City)
33	MF	AUS	Osama Malik

=== From youth squad ===
N	Pos.	Nat.	Name	Age	Notes
17	FW	(Sri Lanka)	Wade Dekker	21	
30	FW	(Australia)	Hernan Espindola	20	

=== Transfers in ===
No.	Pos.	Nat.	Name	Age	Moving from	Type	Transfer window	Ends	Transfer fee	Source
5	DF	(Australia)	Ivan Franjic	27	Free agent	Transfer	Pre-season	2018	Free	
28	FW	(Australia)	Steve Kuzmanovski	18	Western Sydney Wanderers	Transfer	Pre-season	2017	Free	
7	FW	(Australia)	Corey Gameiro	22	Sydney FC	Transfer	Pre-season	2017	Free	
3	MF	(Northern Ireland)	Aaron Hughes	35	Free agent	Transfer	Pre-season	2016	Free	
11	DF	(Australia)	Michael Zullo	26	Utrecht (Netherlands)	Transfer	Pre-season	2016	Free	
23	FW	(Uruguay)	Bruno Fornaroli	27	Danubio (Uruguay)	Transfer	Pre-season	2017	Free	
1	GK	(Denmark)	Thomas Sørensen	39	Free agent	Transfer	Pre-season	2017	Free	
16	MF	(Australia)	Jason Trifiro	27	Free agent	Transfer	Pre-season	2016	Free	
27	DF	(Australia)	Callum Richardson	19	Burnley (England)	Transfer	Pre-season	2016	Free	
20	GK	(Australia)	Dean Bouzanis	20	Western Sydney Wanderers	Transfer	Mid-season	2016	Free	
29	MF	(Australia)	Anthony Cáceres	23	Manchester City (England)	Loan	Mid-season	2016	Free	
33	MF	(Australia)	Osama Malik	25	Adelaide United	Transfer	Mid-season	2018	Free	
27	MF	(Australia)	Nick Fitzgerald	23	Free agent	Transfer	Mid-season	2016	Free	
2	DF	(Australia)	Alex Wilkinson	31	Free agent	Transfer	Mid-season	2016	Free	

=== Transfers out ===
No.	Pos.	Nat.	Name	Age	Moving to	Type	Transfer window	Transfer fee	Source
3	DF	(Netherlands)	Rob Wielaert	36		End of contract	Pre-season	Free	
7	MF	(Australia)	Iain Ramsay	27		End of contract	Pre-season	Free	
11	MF	(Republic of Ireland)	Damien Duff	36		End of contract	Pre-season	Free	
23	FW	(Australia)	Mate Dugandzic	25		End of contract	Pre-season	Free	
27	DF	(Netherlands)	Kew Jaliens	36		End of contract	Pre-season	Free	
27	DF	(Australia)	Ross Archibald	20	Fortuna Düsseldorf II (Germany)	End of contract	Pre-season	Free	
1	GK	(Australia)	Andrew Redmayne	26	Western Sydney Wanderers	Transfer	Pre-season	Free	
16	FW	(Australia)	Joshua Kennedy	32		Retired	Pre-season		
8	MF	(Australia)	Massimo Murdocca	30	Avondale FC	End of contract	Pre-season	Free	
17	DF	(Australia)	Jason Hoffman	26	Newcastle Jets	Transfer	Pre-season	Free	
13	MF	(Argentina)	Jonatan Germano	27		End of Contract	Pre-season	Free	
20	GK	(Australia)	Tando Velaphi	28		Released	Mid-season	Free	
15	FW	(Australia)	David Williams	27		Released	Mid-season	Free	
10	MF	(Slovenia)	Robert Koren	35		Released	Mid-season	Free	
21	MF	(Australia)	Stefan Mauk	20	Adelaide United	Transfer	Mid-season	Free	
27	DF	(Australia)	Callum Richardson	20		End of contract	Mid-season	Free	
6	MF	(Australia)	Erik Paartalu	29		Released	Mid-season	Free	
30	FW	(Australia)	Hernan Espindola	21	Hume City	Transfer	Mid-season	Free	
36	DF	(Australia)	Matt Millar	19	South Melbourne	Transfer	Mid-season	Free	

== Technical staff ==
Position	Name
Head coach	(Netherlands) John van 't Schip
Senior Assistant Coach	(Australia) Luciano Trani
Assistant coaches	(Croatia) Joey Didulica
Assistant coaches	(Croatia) Ivan Jolic
Goalkeeping coach	(Australia) Clint Bolton
Physiotherapist	(Australia) Belinda Pacella
Youth Team Coach	(Australia) Joe Palatsides

== Statistics ==
=== Squad statistics ===
N	Pos.	Nat.	Name	Total					A-League					A-League Finals series					FFA Cup
N	Pos.	Nat.	Name	Apps	Goals	Yellow card	Second yellow card	Red card	Apps	Goals	Yellow card	Second yellow card	Red card	Apps	Goals	Yellow card	Second yellow card	Red card	Apps	Goals	Yellow card	Second yellow card	Red card
1	GK	(Denmark)	Thomas Sørensen	30	0	3	0	0	27+0	0	3	0	0	2+0	0	0	0	0	0+1	0	0	0	0
2	DF	(Australia)	Alex Wilkinson	10	0	0	0	0	8+0	0	0	0	0	2+0	0	0	0	0	0+0	0	0	0	0
3	DF	(Northern Ireland)	Aaron Hughes	6	1	0	0	0	5+1	1	0	0	0	0+0	0	0	0	0	0+0	0	0	0	0
4	DF	(Australia)	Connor Chapman	16	1	2	0	0	12+0	1	2	0	0	0+2	0	0	0	0	2+0	0	0	0	0
5	DF	(Australia)	Ivan Franjic	18	0	5	0	0	17+1	0	5	0	0	0+0	0	0	0	0	0+0	0	0	0	0
7	FW	(Australia)	Corey Gameiro	5	0	2	0	0	2+3	0	2	0	0	0+0	0	0	0	0	0+0	0	0	0	0
8	MF	(Australia)	Aaron Mooy	30	17	3	0	0	23+1	11	1	0	0	2+0	0	1	0	0	4+0	6	1	0	0
9	FW	(Martinique)	Harry Novillo	23	11	6	0	0	20+1	10	6	0	0	0+0	0	0	0	0	2+0	1	0	0	0
11	DF	(Australia)	Michael Zullo	17	0	5	0	0	11+4	0	5	0	0	0+0	0	0	0	0	2+0	0	0	0	0
14	FW	(Australia)	James Brown	1	0	0	0	0	0+1	0	0	0	0	0+0	0	0	0	0	0+0	0	0	0	0
16	MF	(Australia)	Jason Trifiro	8	0	2	0	0	1+6	0	2	0	0	0+0	0	0	0	0	0+1	0	0	0	0
17	FW	(Sri Lanka)	Wade Dekker	9	2	2	0	0	2+3	1	2	0	0	0+0	0	0	0	0	3+1	1	0	0	0
18	MF	(Australia)	Paulo Retre	27	1	7	0	0	14+8	1	6	0	0	2+0	0	1	0	0	3+0	0	0	0	0
19	MF	(Australia)	Ben Garuccio	22	1	6	0	0	14+5	1	5	0	0	2+0	0	1	0	0	1+0	0	0	0	0
19	DF	(North Macedonia)	Philip Petreski	1	0	0	0	0	0+0	0	0	0	0	0+0	0	0	0	0	0+1	0	0	0	0
20	GK	(Australia)	Dean Bouzanis	1	0	0	0	0	0+1	0	0	0	0	0+0	0	0	0	0	0+0	0	0	0	0
22	DF	(Australia)	Jack Clisby	24	0	7	0	0	12+6	0	7	0	0	2+0	0	0	0	0	3+1	0	0	0	0
23	FW	(Uruguay)	Bruno Fornaroli	32	28	4	0	0	27+0	23	4	0	0	2+0	2	0	0	0	3+0	3	0	0	0
24	DF	(Australia)	Patrick Kisnorbo	30	2	7	0	0	24+0	2	5	0	0	2+0	0	1	0	0	3+1	0	1	0	0
25	MF	(Australia)	Jacob Melling	23	0	3	0	1	16+4	0	2	0	1	0+2	0	0	0	0	1+0	0	1	0	0
26	FW	(Australia)	Marc Marino	4	1	0	0	0	0+2	1	0	0	0	0+2	0	0	0	0	0+0	0	0	0	0
27	FW	(Australia)	Nick Fitzgerald	13	2	1	0	0	8+3	2	1	0	0	2+0	0	0	0	0	0+0	0	0	0	0
28	FW	(Australia)	Steve Kuzmanovski	7	0	1	0	0	3+3	0	1	0	0	0+0	0	0	0	0	1+0	0	0	0	0
29	MF	(Australia)	Anthony Cáceres	11	1	1	2	0	7+2	1	0	2	0	2+0	0	1	0	0	0+0	0	0	0	0
33	DF	(Australia)	Osama Malik	14	0	5	0	0	11+1	0	5	0	0	2+0	0	0	0	0	0+0	0	0	0	0
34	FW	(Australia)	Stefan Zinni	6	0	0	0	0	1+2	0	0	0	0	0+0	0	0	0	0	2+1	0	0	0	0
39	MF	(Australia)	Ali Eyigun	2	0	0	0	0	1+0	0	0	0	0	0+0	0	0	0	0	0+1	0	0	0	0
50	GK	(Australia)	Alex Pavlidis	0	0	0	0	0	0+0	0	0	0	0	0+0	0	0	0	0	0+0	0	0	0	0
Players no longer at the club:
6	MF	(Australia)	Erik Paartalu	17	4	5	0	0	14+0	4	4	0	0	0+0	0	0	0	0	3+0	0	1	0	0
10	MF	(Slovenia)	Robert Koren	8	1	0	0	0	3+3	0	0	0	0	0+0	0	0	0	0	2+0	1	0	0	0
13	MF	(Argentina)	Jonatan Germano	1	0	0	0	0	0+0	0	0	0	0	0+0	0	0	0	0	0+1	0	0	0	0
15	FW	(Australia)	David Williams	11	0	1	0	0	2+8	0	1	0	0	0+0	0	0	0	0	0+1	0	0	0	0
20	GK	(Australia)	Tando Velaphi	4	0	0	0	0	0+0	0	0	0	0	0+0	0	0	0	0	4+0	0	0	0	0
21	MF	(Australia)	Stefan Mauk	16	4	0	0	0	9+3	4	0	0	0	0+0	0	0	0	0	2+2	0	0	0	0
27	DF	(Australia)	Callum Richardson	0	0	0	0	0	0+0	0	0	0	0	0+0	0	0	0	0	0+0	0	0	0	0
30	FW	(Australia)	Hernan Espindola	5	0	0	0	0	1+3	0	0	0	0	0+0	0	0	0	0	1+0	0	0	0	0
36	DF	(Australia)	Matt Millar	5	1	3	0	0	2+2	0	3	0	0	0+0	0	0	0	0	1+0	1	0	0	0

- Last updated: 22 April 2016
- Source: au.soccerway.com
- (yellow card) = Number of bookings; (second yellow card) = Number of sending offs after a second yellow card; (red card) = Number of sending offs by a direct red card.

== Pre-season and friendlies ==
18 July 2015 Friendly	Melbourne City (Australia)	0–1	(England) Manchester City	Robina, Australia
8:20 GMT+1		Report	Nasri 86'	Stadium: Cbus Super Stadium; Referee: Strebre Delovski

28 July 2015 Friendly	Melbourne City (Australia)	5–1	(Australia) Young Socceroos	Melbourne, Australia
	Goalscorers not recorded	Report	Goalscorers not recorded	Stadium: City Football Academy; Attendance: 0 (Behind closed doors)

16 August 2015 Friendly	Melbourne City (Australia)	1–1	(Australia) Newcastle Jets	Melbourne, Australia
	Goalscorers not recorded		Goalscorers not recorded	Stadium: City Football Academy; Attendance: 0 (Behind closed doors)

22 August 2015 Friendly	Adelaide United (Australia)	4–3	(Australia) Melbourne City	Darwin, Australia
19:00 (ACST)	Sánchez 18'; Dugandzic 52'; Jeggo 80'; Goodwin 86'	Report	Espindola 16'; Germano 29'; Mauk 37'	Stadium: Larrakia Park; Attendance: 1,600

4 September 2015 Friendly	Melbourne City (Australia)	5–0	(Australia) North Geelong Warriors	Port Melbourne, Australia
19:30 (AEST)	Marino 15'; Chapman 50'; Cristaldo 77'; Dekker 79'; Mauk 80' (pen.)	Report		Stadium: JL Murphy Reserve

9 September 2015 Friendly	Oakleigh Cannons (Australia)	0–8	(Australia) Melbourne City	Oakleigh, Australia
19:30 (AEST)		Report	Paartalu 4'; Koren 7', 42'; Mauk 33'; Dekker 65', 78'; Cristaldo 71'; Espindola 84'	Stadium: Jack Edwards Reserve; Attendance: 1,907

16 September 2015 Friendly	Melbourne City (Australia)	1–3	(Australia) Adelaide United	Melbourne, Australia
13:00 (AEST)	Dekker 90'	Report	Jeggo 16'; Carrusca 21'; Cirio 58'	Stadium: City Football Academy; Attendance: 0 (Behind closed doors)

15 October 2015 Friendly	Hume City (Australia)	2–0	(Australia) Melbourne City	Melbourne, Australia
	Clark 4'; Msahli 11'	Report		Stadium: ABD Stadium

== Competitions ==
=== Overview ===
Competition	First match	Last match	Starting round	Final position	Record							
Competition	First match	Last match	Starting round	Final position	Pld	W	D	L	GF	GA	GD	Win %
A-League	10 October 2015	8 April 2016	Matchday 1	4th	27	13	5	9	63	44	+19	48.15
A-League Finals	17 April 2016	22 April 2016	Elimination-finals	Semi-finals	2	1	0	1	3	4	−1	50.00
FFA Cup	4 August 2015	21 October 2015	Round of 32	Semi-finals	4	3	0	1	13	5	+8	75.00
Total					33	17	5	11	79	53	+26	51.52

Source: Competitions

=== A-League ===
==== League table ====
Pos	Team	Pld	W	D	L	GF	GA	GD	Pts	Qualification
1	Adelaide United (C)	27	14	7	6	45	28	+17	49	Qualification for 2017 AFC Champions League group stage and Finals series
2	Western Sydney Wanderers	27	14	6	7	44	33	+11	48	Qualification for 2017 AFC Champions League group stage and Finals series
3	Brisbane Roar	27	14	6	7	49	40	+9	48	Qualification for 2017 AFC Champions League second preliminary round and Finals series
4	Melbourne City	27	13	5	9	63	44	+19	44	Qualification for Finals series
5	Perth Glory	27	13	4	10	49	42	+7	43	Qualification for Finals series
6	Melbourne Victory	27	11	8	8	40	33	+7	41	Qualification for Finals series
7	Sydney FC	27	8	10	9	36	36	0	34	
8	Newcastle Jets	27	8	6	13	28	41	−13	30	
9	Wellington Phoenix (Note: Wellington Phoenix cannot qualify for the AFC Champions League as they are not recognised as an AFC club.)	27	7	4	16	34	54	−20	25	
10	Central Coast Mariners	27	3	4	20	33	70	−37	13	

Source: A-Leagues
Rules for classification: 1) points; 2) goal difference; 3) number of goals scored.
(C) Champions

==== Results summary ====
Overall								Home						Away					
Pld	W	D	L	GF	GA	GD	Pts	W	D	L	GF	GA	GD	W	D	L	GF	GA	GD
27	13	5	9	63	44	+19	44	9	2	3	35	20	+15	4	3	6	28	24	+4

Last updated: 8 April 2016.
Source: ultimatealeague.com

==== Results by round ====
Round	1	2	3	4	5	6	7	8	9	10	11	12	13	14	15	16	17	18	19	20	21	22	23	24	25	26	27
Ground	A	A	H	H	A	H	A	H	A	A	H	A	H	H	A	H	A	A	H	H	A	H	A	H	H	A	H
Result	D	L	W	L	W	L	D	W	W	W	W	L	D	W	D	W	L	L	D	W	L	W	W	W	W	L	L
Position	4	8	5	6	5	7	7	6	5	3	3	3	3	3	4	2	3	3	4	4	4	4	4	2	1	4	4

Updated to match(es) played on 8 April 2016. Source: ultimatealeague.com
A = Away; H = Home; W = Win; D = Draw; L = Loss

==== Matches ====
Source: Melbourne City FC 2015–16 season fixtures

10 October 2015 1	Sydney FC	1–1	Melbourne City	Sydney
19:30 AEDT (UTC+11:00)	Hološko 45+3'	Report	Dekker 16'	Stadium: Allianz Stadium; Attendance: 17,051; Referee: Ben Williams

17 October 2015 2	Melbourne Victory	3–2	Melbourne City	Melbourne
19:30 AEDT (UTC+11:00)	Ben Khalfallah 23'; Barbarouses 57'; Berisha 90'	Report	Fornaroli 69'; Mauk 71'	Stadium: Etihad Stadium; Attendance: 40,217; Referee: Jarred Gillett

25 October 2015 3	Melbourne City	3–1	Central Coast Mariners	Melbourne
17:00 AEDT (UTC+11:00)	Kisnorbo 11'; Fornaroli 53', 72'	Report	Fitzgerald 13'	Stadium: AAMI Park; Attendance: 8,408; Referee: Chris Beath

30 October 2015 4	Melbourne City	2–3	Newcastle Jets	Melbourne
19:40 AEDT (UTC+11:00)	Mooy 12'; Mauk 22'	Report	Kantarovski 58'; Trifunović 74' (pen.), 79'	Stadium: AAMI Park; Attendance: 7,209; Referee: Jarred Gillett

5 November 2015 5	Adelaide United	2–4	Melbourne City	Adelaide
19:30 ACDT (UTC+10:30)	Cirio 66'; Sánchez 85' (pen.)	Report	Paartalu 8'; Mooy 35'; Fornaroli 56', 71'	Stadium: Coopers Stadium; Attendance: 8,632; Referee: Kris Griffiths-Jones

13 November 2015 6	Melbourne City	0–3	Western Sydney Wanderers	Melbourne
19:40 AEST (UTC+11:00)		Report	Nichols 47'; Piovaccari 61'; Bridge 84'	Stadium: AAMI Park; Attendance: 7,910; Referee: Peter Green

20 November 2015 7	Brisbane Roar	1–1	Melbourne City	Brisbane
20:00 AEDT (UTC+11:00)	Henrique 70'	Report	Novillo 47'	Stadium: Suncorp Stadium; Attendance: 10,812; Referee: Chris Beath

27 November 2015 8	Melbourne City	5–1	Perth Glory	Melbourne
19:40 AEDT (UTC+11:00)	Paartalu 6'; Chapman 19'; Fornaroli 35'; Novillo 53'; Mooy 82' (pen.)	Report	Sidnei 45+2'; A. Williams (yellow card) 75' (yellow-red card) 82'	Stadium: AAMI Park; Attendance: 5,953; Referee: Kris Griffiths-Jones

3 December 2015 9	Central Coast Mariners	1–5	Melbourne City	Gosford
17:00 AEDT (UTC+11:00)	Austin 86'	Report	Novillo 26', 57'; Fornaroli 45'; Mauk 75'; Mooy 90+5'	Stadium: Central Coast Stadium; Attendance: 4,514; Referee: Strebre Delovski

13 December 2015 10	Newcastle Jets	0–4	Melbourne City	Newcastle
17:00 AEDT (UTC+11:00)		Report	Mooy 43', 59'; Fornaroli 56', 62'	Stadium: Hunter Stadium; Attendance: 10,087; Referee: Chris Beath

19 December 2015 11	Melbourne City	2–1	Melbourne Victory	Melbourne
19:30 AEDT (UTC+11:00)	Mauk 20'; Retre 30'	Report	Berisha 45'	Stadium: AAMI Park; Attendance: 23,572; Referee: Ben Williams

27 December 2015 12	Brisbane Roar	3–1	Melbourne City	Brisbane
19:00 AEDT (UTC+11:00)	Kisnorbo 31' (o.g.); Borrello 40'; Henrique 90+4'	Report	Fornaroli 49'	Stadium: Suncorp Stadium; Attendance: 16,435; Referee: Jarred Gillett

2 January 2016 13	Melbourne City	2–2	Sydney FC	Melbourne
19:30 AEDT (UTC+11:00)	Hughes 37'; Fornaroli 60'	Report	Ninković 53', 78'	Stadium: AAMI Park; Attendance: 10,140; Referee: Strebre Delovski

9 January 2016 14	Melbourne City	3–2	Western Sydney Wanderers	Melbourne
19:30 AEDT (UTC+11:00)	Novillo 7', 85'; Fornaroli 24'	Report	Nichols 29'; Hughes 60' (o.g.)	Stadium: AAMI Park; Attendance: 9,776; Referee: Jarred Gillett

16 January 2016 15	Perth Glory	2–2	Melbourne City	Perth
19:40 AWST (UTC+08:00)	Castro 45+2'; Harold 60'; Collard (yellow card) 30' (yellow-red card) 63'	Report	Paartalu 31'; Mooy 47'	Stadium: nib Stadium; Attendance: 7,021; Referee: Ben Williams

25 January 2016 16	Melbourne City	3–1	Wellington Phoenix	Melbourne
19:30 AEDT (UTC+11:00)	Fornaroli 12'; Novillo 31', 49'	Report	Bonevacia 66'	Stadium: AAMI Park; Attendance: 10,825; Referee: Peter Green

29 January 2016 17	Western Sydney Wanderers	4–3	Melbourne City	Sydney
19:40 AEDT (UTC+11:00)	Nichols 32'; Bridge 60', 66'; Šantalab 89'	Report	Novillo 76'; Fornaroli 78'; Cáceres (yellow card) 65' (yellow-red card) 85'; Paartalu 90+3'	Stadium: Pirtek Stadium; Attendance: 14,820; Referee: Shaun Evans

7 February 2016 18	Newcastle Jets	2–1	Melbourne City	Newcastle
17:00 AEDT (UTC+11:00)	Trifunović 47' (pen.), 72'	Report	Melling (red card) 63'; Fornaroli 80'	Stadium: Hunter Stadium; Attendance: 7,266; Referee: Adam Fielding

13 February 2016 19	Melbourne City	2–2	Melbourne Victory	Melbourne
19:30 AEDT (UTC+11:00)	Fornaroli 22', 31'; Cáceres (yellow card) 12' (yellow-red card) 79'	Report	Khalfallah 28'; Finkler 47'	Stadium: AAMI Park; Attendance: 25,738; Referee: Chris Beath

21 February 2016 20	Melbourne City	4–1	Central Coast Mariners	Melbourne
17:00 AEDT (UTC+11:00)	Kisnorbo 48'; Mooy 66' (pen.), 90+10'; Garuccio 69'	Report	Austin 34'; Ferreira (yellow card) 55' (yellow-red card) 85'	Stadium: AAMI Park; Attendance: 7,535; Referee: Stephen Lucas

26 February 2016 21	Wellington Phoenix	2–1	Melbourne City	Wellington
19:30 NZDT (UTC+13:00)	Fenton 12'; Ridenton 15'	Report	Mooy 19'	Stadium: Westpac Stadium; Attendance: 6,591; Referee: Matthew Conger

5 March 2016 22	Melbourne City	3–0	Sydney FC	Melbourne
19:30 AEDT (UTC+11:00)	Fornaroli 41', 71', 82'	Report		Stadium: AAMI Park; Attendance: 8,584; Referee: Jarred Gillett

11 March 2016 23	Adelaide United	0–1	Melbourne City	Adelaide
19:10 ACDT (UTC+10:30)		Report	Fitzgerald 71'	Stadium: Coopers Stadium; Attendance: 14,274; Referee: Chris Beath

18 March 2016 24	Melbourne City	3–1	Brisbane Roar	Melbourne
19:40 AEDT (UTC+11:00)	Mooy 54' (pen.); Cáceres 81'; Fitzgerald 84'	Report	Petratos 22'; Hingert (yellow card) 45+1' (yellow-red card) 53'	Stadium: AAMI Park; Attendance: 7,658; Referee: Kris Griffiths-Jones

28 March 2016 25	Melbourne City	3–0	Wellington Phoenix	Melbourne
19:30 AEDT (UTC+11:00)	Novillo 43'; Fornaroli 66', 80'	Report		Stadium: AAMI Park; Attendance: 9,895; Referee: Chris Beath

3 April 2016 26	Perth Glory	3–2	Melbourne City	Perth
17:00 AWST (UTC+08:00)	Keogh 55'; Sándor 67'; Castro 71'	Report	Fornaroli 73'; Marino 90+2'	Stadium: nib Stadium; Attendance: 14,504; Referee: Shaun Evans

8 April 2016 27	Melbourne City	0–2	Adelaide United	Melbourne
19:40 AEST (UTC+10:00)		Report	Isaías 4'; Djite 45+2' (pen.)	Stadium: AAMI Park; Attendance: 11,454; Referee: Strebre Delovski

==== Finals series ====
17 April 2016 Elimination-finals	Melbourne City	2–0	Perth Glory	Melbourne
17:00 AEST (UTC+10:00)	Fornaroli 40', 76'	Report		Stadium: AAMI Park; Attendance: 11,273; Referee: Chris Beath

22 April 2016 Semi-finals	Adelaide United	4–1	Melbourne City	Adelaide
19:15 ACST (UTC+9:30)	Djite 48', 60' (pen.); McGowan 88'; Sánchez 90+4'	Report	Fitzgerald 72'	Stadium: Coopers Stadium; Attendance: 15,489; Referee: Strebre Delovski

=== FFA Cup ===
4 August 2015 Round of 32	Edgeworth Eagles (New South Wales)	1–2	(Victoria (state)) Melbourne City	Newcastle
19:30 AEST	Hammel 26' (pen.)	Report	Mooy 35', 90+3'	Stadium: Magic Park; Attendance: 2,430; Referee: Kris Griffiths Jones

26 August 2015 Round of 16	Melbourne City (Victoria (state))	5–1	(New Zealand) Wellington Phoenix	Melbourne
19:30 AEST	Mooy 18' (pen.); Novillo 21'; Fornaroli 32' (pen.); Koren 40'; Dekker 49'	Report	Krishna 34'	Stadium: AAMI Park; Attendance: 4,027; Referee: Lucien Laverdure

29 September 2015 Quarter-finals	Heidelberg United (Victoria (state))	0–5	(Victoria (state)) Melbourne City	Melbourne
20:00 AEST		Report	Fornaroli 2', 90+2'; Mooy 65', 69', 84'	Stadium: Olympic Village; Attendance: 11,372; Referee: Strebre Delovski

21 October 2015 Semi-finals	Perth Glory (Western Australia)	3–1	(Victoria (state)) Melbourne City	Perth
18:30 AWST	Sándor 24'; Garuccio 45+3' (o.g.); Harold 72'	Report	Millar 43'	Stadium: nib Stadium; Attendance: 4,165; Referee: Shaun Evans

== See also ==
- 2015–16 Melbourne City FC (W-League) season
