= Aaron Mooy =

Australian association football player (born 1990)

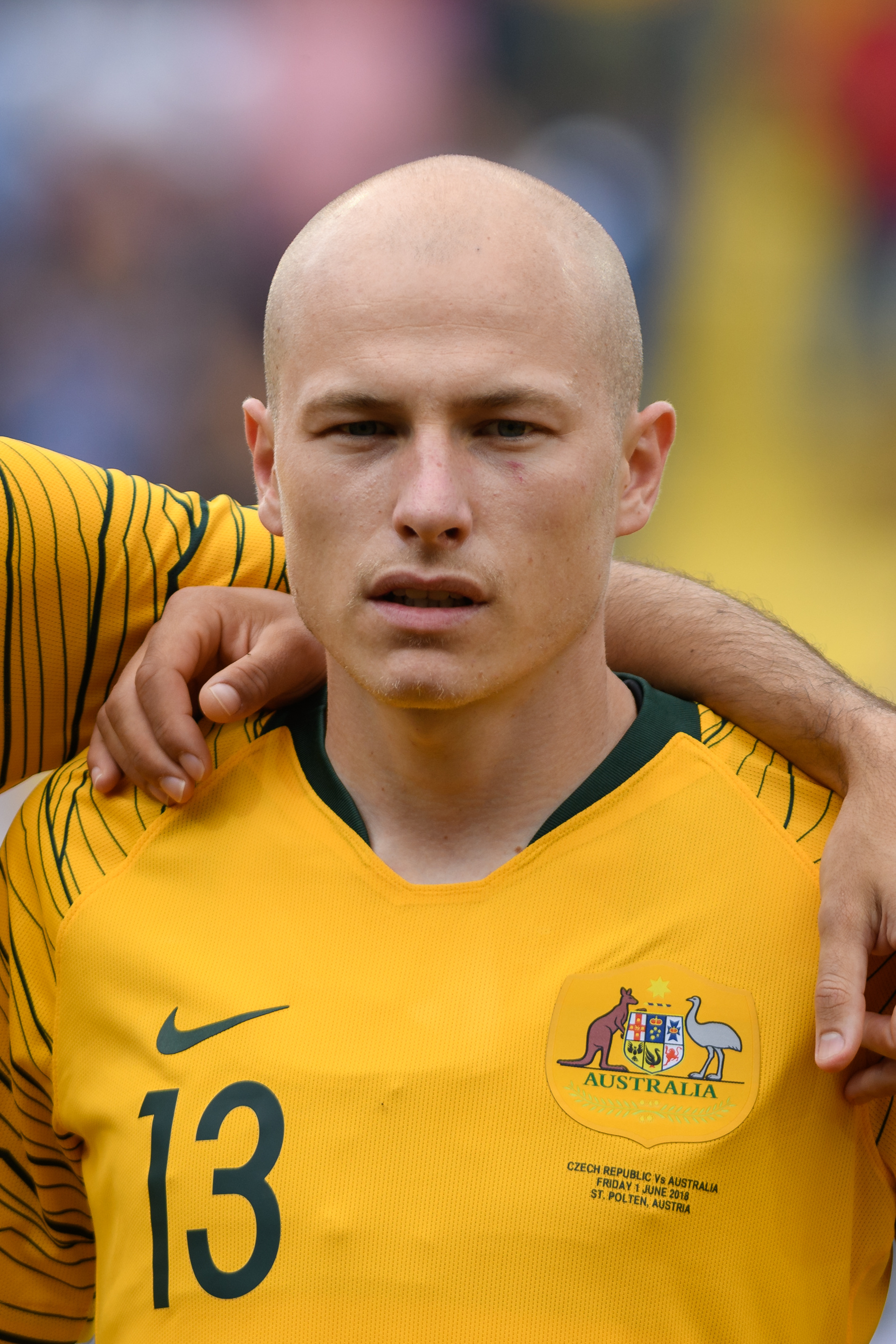
- Mooy lining up for Australia in 2018

Personal information
- Full name: Aaron Frank Mooy
- Birth name: Aaron Frank Kuhlman
- Date of birth: 15 September 1990 (age 36)
- Place of birth: Sydney, New South Wales, Australia
- Height: 1.74 m (5 ft 9 in)
- Position: Midfielder

Youth career
- Carlingford Redbacks
- 2005–2006: NSWIS
- 2006–2009: Bolton Wanderers

Senior career*
Years	Team	Apps	(Gls)
2009–2010	Bolton Wanderers	0	(0)
2010–2012	St Mirren	21	(1)
2012–2014	Western Sydney Wanderers	49	(4)
2014–2016	Melbourne City	53	(18)
2016–2017	Manchester City	0	(0)
2016–2017	→ Huddersfield Town (loan)	45	(4)
2017–2020	Huddersfield Town	66	(7)
2019–2020	→ Brighton & Hove Albion (loan)	17	(2)
2020	Brighton & Hove Albion	14	(0)
2020–2022	Shanghai Port	23	(6)
2022–2023	Celtic	29	(4)
Total		317	(46)

International career
2006	Australia U17	2	(0)
2009–2010	Australia U20	10	(4)
2011–2012	Australia U23	4	(2)
2012–2023	Australia	57	(7)
- * Club domestic league appearances and goals

Aaron Frank Mooy (né Kuhlman; /mɔɪ/ MOY; born 15 September 1990) is an Australian former professional soccer player who primarily played as a midfielder.

He is considered to be one of the great Australian midfielders and one of the best players to represent Huddersfield Town since the turn of the millennium. (Note: Citations:) Mooy was voted PFA Footballer of the Year a record three times, consecutively, and was nominated for the 2017 Asian Footballer of the Year award. He was named in the A-League Men Team of the Season twice, and was named in the PFA Team of the Year and EFL Team of the Season once. He was voted and named in Australia's Team of the Century.

Born in Sydney, Mooy made his professional debut with St Mirren in 2010 before returning to Australia with Western Sydney Wanderers, winning the A-League Premiers' title in their inaugural season. However, after inconsistent playing time, he left for Melbourne City and moved to sister team Manchester City in 2016. Mooy was immediately loaned to Huddersfield, achieving promotion to the Premier League for the first time in the club's history. He signed a permanent deal the following season. After his second season at the club ended with their relegation in the summer of 2020, Mooy was loaned out to Brighton, to whom he transferred permanently in January 2021.

The same year, he then agreed a transfer deal to the Chinese Super League with Shanghai Port but was released due to the COVID outbreak. He joined Celtic in July 2022, being a key part in their 8th treble, winning the Scottish Premiership, Scottish League Cup and Scottish Cup before retiring in June 2023.

Mooy amassed a total of 57 caps and 7 goals during his time playing for Australia, mainly playing in the World Cup qualifying campaigns. He played in the 2018 World Cup and 2022 World Cup, and made his final appearance against Argentina before retiring in June 2023.

== Early life ==
Aaron Frank Mooy was born on 15 September 1990 in Sydney, Australia. At birth, he was given the name Aaron Kuhlman, but his surname was changed by his Dutch mother after she divorced his father during Mooy's early childhood. Mooy had minimal contact with his father, with their only meeting occurring when Mooy was a toddler, and briefly again at 14 during which his father signed forms for his Dutch passport. Mooy was unaware that he had a brother with the same biological father until his brother approached him during his time at Western Sydney Wanderers.

During his upbringing, Mooy developed an interest in watching Premier League matches, particularly favouring Manchester United. David Beckham became his favourite player, and he would watch Beckham's games and practice free kicks, often pretending to be him. His mother responded to his interest in football by registering him with the Carlingford Redbacks. His German stepfather, Alan Todd, would soon join to coach his team.

Mooy's early football journey included stints with various clubs such as the Carlingford Redbacks, Granville Magpies, Blacktown City, and Northern Spirit. He enrolled at the New South Wales Institute of Sport (NSWIS) at Sydney Olympic Park and attended Westfields Sports High School. Mornings were dedicated to training, while afternoons were reserved for academic classes. Mooy left his home country at the age of 15 to pursue his ambitions.

== Club career ==
=== Early career ===
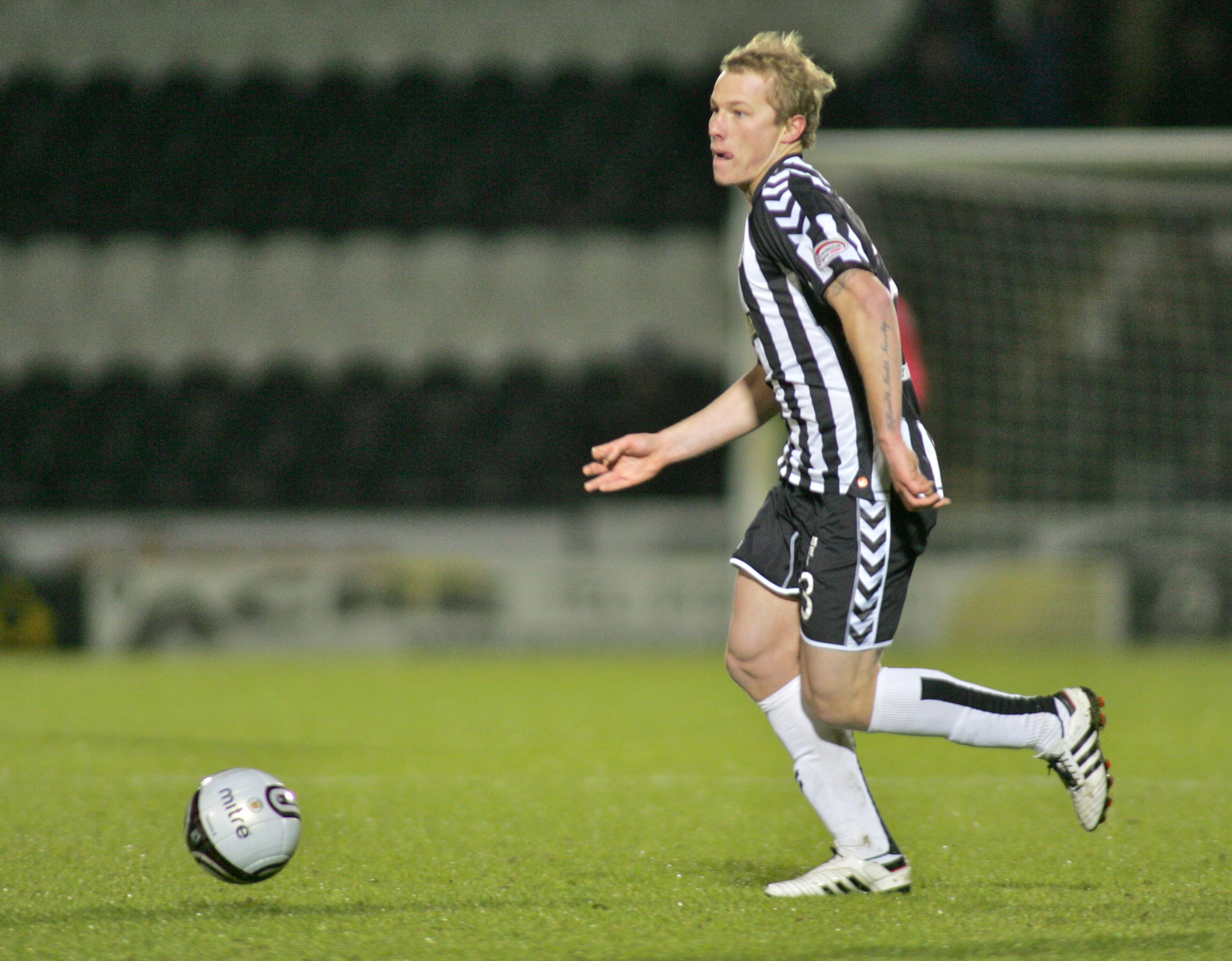
Mooy playing for St Mirren in 2011

Mooy started his career in Europe as a youth scholar at Bolton Wanderers after being spotted by Chris Sulley. He rejected a contract extension from Bolton in July 2010 in search of more first team football, and duly joined Scottish Premier League club St Mirren the following October, making his league debut in a 3–0 loss to Hearts. On 18 January 2011, he scored his first goal for the club, in the fourth-round replay, in a 6–1 win over Peterhead. Having made 18 appearances and scoring once in all competitions, he was offered a new contract in April 2011 before agreeing a two-year contract with the club in May.

The 2011–12 season was marked by Mooy having suffered a stress fracture in his back. On 17 December 2011, Mooy made his return, coming as a substitute, in a 1–1 draw against Motherwell and in the next game on Christmas Eve 2011 he scored his first league goal for the club against Rangers at St Mirren Park. On 20 June 2012, Mooy was released from St Mirren, having made 30 appearances.

=== Western Sydney Wanderers ===
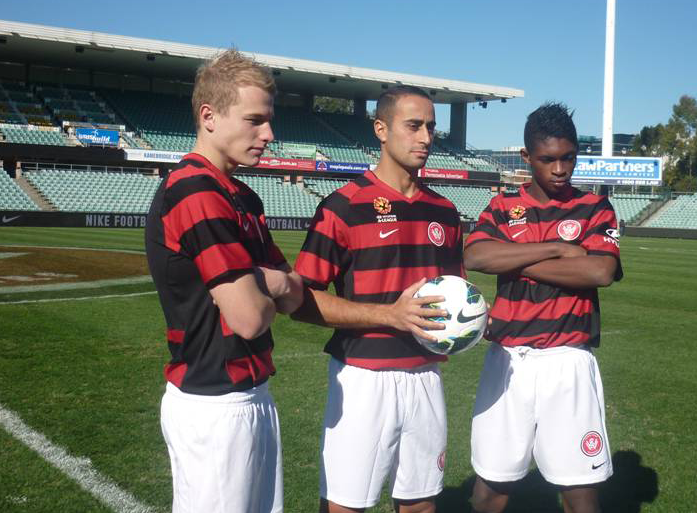
Mooy (left) at the Western Sydney Wanderers launch, along with Tarek Elrich and Kwabena Appiah

On 25 June 2012, Mooy signed with Western Sydney Wanderers, becoming one of the club's first signings for their inaugural season in the A-League. The official media launch took place at Parramatta Stadium, where he was introduced alongside Tarek Elrich and Kwabena Appiah. Mooy would be joined byMark Bridge, Michael Beauchamp and Shannon Cole prior to the club's first training session on 2 July. Mooy made his unofficial debut on 26 July at Cook Park, St Marys, in front of a crowd of 3,612, in the Wanderers' 5–0 debut win against Nepean.

On 6 October, Mooy made his competitive debut in the opening game of the season in a 0–0 home draw against Central Coast Mariners. He played in the first Sydney Derby match on 20 October, where his side succumbed to a 1–0 defeat after Alessandro Del Piero scored the winner for Sydney FC. On 23 February 2013, Mooy scored his first goal for the club, netting the winner in a 1–0 win against Perth Glory, but was benched the next game by Tony Popovic before the Wanderers' won their 8th successive win in a row. Mooy would miss the final games against Brisbane Roar and Newcastle due to a knee injury, as the Wanderers lifted the Premiers' Plate in the last round at Hunter Stadium in front of 8,000 Wanderers fans.

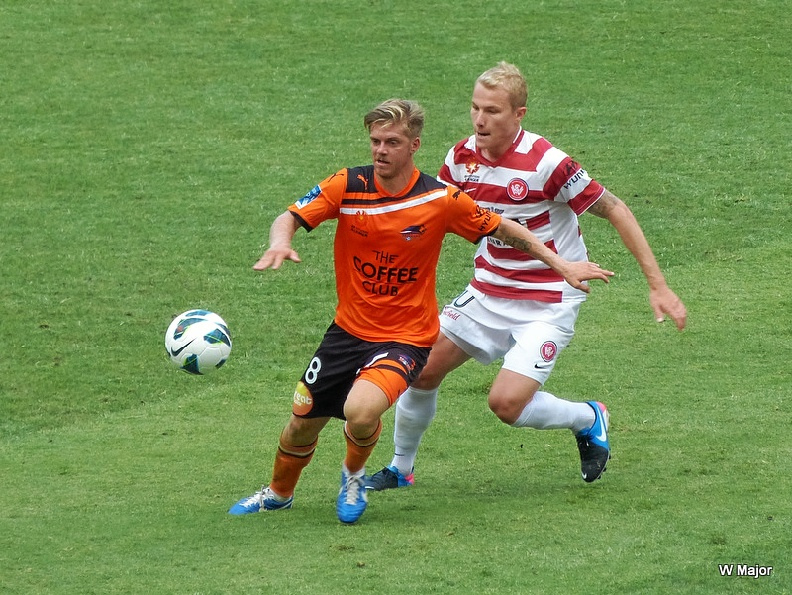
Mooy playing for Western Sydney Wanderers in 2013

He made his return in the Grand Final where his side lost 2–0 to Central Coast Mariners. In January 2014, Mooy handed in a request for an immediate transfer to Western Sydney Wanderers due to being unhappy with inconsistent game time during the season. In the following two games against Perth Glory and Newcastle he scored his 2nd and 3rd goals of the season. Mooy was included in the finalised squad for the Wanderers in their first AFC Champions League campaign. He scored his first AFC Champions League goal in a 5–0 group stage victory over Guizhou Renhe, which secured the side's qualification to the Round of 16. Two weeks later, Mooy made a substitute appearance in his second consecutive Grand Final where he was booked in extra time as the team lost 2–1 to Brisbane Roar in front of 51,153 attendees at Suncorp Stadium. On 21 May, Mooy was released by the club.

=== Melbourne City ===
==== 2014–15 ====
On the day of his release, Mooy signed a two-year contract with Melbourne City. He made his league debut on 11 October 2014 against Sydney FC, sitting in midfield behind a forward line consisting of David Villa. Mooy was named as Melbourne City's inaugural Etihad Player of the month for October, after registering two assists, and again for November due his performance in City's first win of the season against Brisbane Roar. Mooy scored his first goal on 7 December, the only goal from a penalty in the home fixture against Brisbane, and voted Man of the match for his performance. On 27 December, Mooy received his second man of the match award, scoring in City's 1–1 draw against Perth Glory.

Continuing his form in February, Mooy scored the winning goal from 20 metres against his former club, Western Sydney Wanderers, to secure his side a 2–1 win. His performances saw him labelled by John van 't Schip as his "most stable and most important player". At the end of the season, Mooy collected the Golden Boot (7 goals), Supporters’ Player of the Year and the Player of the Year in Melbourne City's award ceremony. He contributed to 47% of City's goals, led the A-League for balls into the penalty area, completed crosses, completed through balls and shot assists, while defensively he was second in the competition for effective tackles.

==== 2015–16 ====
Mooy signed a three-year deal as the club's marquee player ahead of the 2015–16 season. He started his campaign by scoring the opening goal from a penalty in a 5–1 win over Wellington Phoenix in the FFA Cup. In the subsequent round, Mooy scored his first hat-trick, the first City player to do so in a cup match, in a 5–0 victory against Heidelberg United at Olympic Village. In the first Melbourne Derby of the league season, Mooy assisted twice, helping Bruno Fornaroli to his first league goal for the club, in a 3–2 loss to Melbourne Victory at Etihad Stadium. In the following month, Mooy scored 6 goals and provided 7 assists, piquing a record $2 million offer from Saudi Arabian club Al Nassr which City rejected.

In the New Year, Mooy missed the game against Sydney FC due to a rib fracture he received three weeks before. Mooy made his return on 9 January 2016, against his former side Western Sydney Wanderers, helping his side to a 3–2 win and ending the Wanderers' 10-game unbeaten streak. On 26 February, Mooy scored his 10th goal of the season, from a deflected free kick, in a 2–1 league defeat to Wellington at Westpac Stadium. Mooy scored his 11th on 18 March against Brisbane, with City becoming the first A-League club to have three players with double-figures in goals; with Harry Novillo (10), and Bruno Fornaroli (21) contributing alongside Mooy. City finished their league campaign, and lost 4–1 to Adelaide United in the A-League semi-final.

By the end of the season, Mooy finished with 11 goals and 21 assists in the league, setting a new record for the most assists in an A-League season and became the first player in A-Leagues history to reach double digits in both goals and assists in a single season. Mooy was placed second in the Johnny Warren Medal, losing to Perth Glory's Diego Castro.

=== Huddersfield Town ===
==== 2016–17: Move to Man City and loan to Huddersfield ====
In June 2016, Mooy transferred from Melbourne City to fellow City Football Group team Manchester City, signing a three-year contract, understood to be around $4 million per year, making him one of the highest-paid Australian footballers. Six days after signing for Manchester City, Mooy was loaned to Championship side Huddersfield Town for the 2016–17 season. He made his Huddersfield debut in their 2–1 win over Brentford on 6 August, and scored his first goal for them on 10 September in a 1–0 win over Leeds United in a West Yorkshire derby. On 28 November 2016, he scored the equaliser in an eventual 2–1 loss at home to Wigan Athletic. Huddersfield Town fans voted Mooy as the best player of the season. Mooy was involved in the squad that won the play-off final, scoring one of Huddersfield's four penalties in the penalty shootout against Reading, which secured them Premier League status for the 2017–18 season, the first time in the club's history.

==== 2017–2019: Permanent transfer and Premier league debut ====
In June 2017, Huddersfield signed Mooy on a permanent basis for an initial £8 million, potentially rising to £10 million depending on add-ons, and a buy-back clause for Man City. Mooy made his Premier League debut for Huddersfield in their first game of the 2017–18 season, a 3–0 win over Crystal Palace, Mooy himself involved in two of the goals. He scored his first Premier League goal one week later, the only goal of the game as Huddersfield defeated Newcastle United. On 21 October 2017, Mooy scored the opening goal as Huddersfield upset Manchester United 2–1 in a Premier League clash at Kirklees Stadium. Following the match, a young fan gifted Mooy £5 for his performance, which he later donated to the club's Town Foundation—a charitable organization dedicated to supporting children in the local community. On 17 December, Mooy added his 3rd and 4th goal of the season, including a brace in the 89th minute from the penalty spot, securing a 4–1 win over Watford. He helped Huddersfield clinch survival on 9 May 2018, assisting Laurent Depoitre, to draw 1–1 at Stamford Bridge against Chelsea.

After recovering from bad form in the early stages of the 2018–19 season, Mooy scored two goals, his second being a free kick, to secure a 2–0 win against Wolverhampton Wanderers that took his side out of the relegation zone, and ending his 29-game run without scoring a goal. During December, Mooy sustained a knee injury after a match against Arsenal which consigned him to the sidelines for two months. Huddersfield recorded 6 losses and 1 draw in their next 7 games, returning to the bottom of the table, and manager David Wagner departed soon afterwards. Mooy returned to fitness in late January 2019, but his side's form faltered, culminating in relegation after a 3–0 defeat to Crystal Palace before the end of March; equalling Derby's record for the earliest relegation from the division. Mooy looked to depart, having a reported asking price of $25 million in the summer transfer window.

=== Brighton & Hove Albion ===
On 8 August 2019, Mooy joined Brighton & Hove Albion on a one-year loan, joining alongside international teammate Mathew Ryan. He made his debut for the club as a substitute on 17 August, in a 1–1 home draw against West Ham United in the Premier League. On 19 October, Mooy was sent off for the first time in his club career after receiving two bookings in the 30th and 35th minute (for fouling Jack Grealish) in Brighton's 2–1 loss to Aston Villa. On 9 December, Mooy assisted the winning goal, a cross to Neal Maupay, to win 2–1 against Arsenal at Emirates Stadium. In the same month, on 28 December, Mooy scored his first goal for The Albion in a 2–0 victory over Bournemouth. His goal was nominated in Premier League Goal of the Month. On 24 January 2020, Brighton announced the permanent signing of Mooy, on a three-and-a-half-year contract, in a deal reported to be worth £5 million. He finished his first season for the south-coast team having made 32 appearances.

=== Shanghai Port ===
Mooy signed for Chinese Super League team Shanghai SIPG (now known as Shanghai Port) in August 2020 after they activated a £4 million release clause. Brighton head coach Graham Potter said upon his departure "I have really enjoyed working with him, and on behalf of everyone at the club I would like to thank him for his contribution and wish him well for the future".

On 15 September 2020, Mooy scored the winning goal on his debut as a substitute in the second half in a 2–1 win against Wuhan. His side finished second in the AFC Champions League group stage, before they were knocked out in the Round of 16 after a 2–0 loss to Vissel Kobe. The next season, Mooy missed out on the 2021 AFC Champions League after Shanghai Port withdrew due to lockdown rules in China. As the lockdowns extended, Mooy refused to return to China for pre-season despite multiple request from Shanghai, in fear of being caught in the pandemic. Shanghai released Mooy in July 2022. His last competitive appearance for the club was on 9 January, after making 13 appearances and scoring 5 goals during the campaign. In order to keep fit, Mooy returned to Glasgow, where his family were based, to train with a fitness coach who flew from Australia's training camp in Dubai.

=== Celtic ===
On 19 July 2022, Mooy signed a two-year deal with Celtic, reuniting with former manager Ange Postecoglou. His contract was worth £1.2 million per year, a salary cut from his £3 million per year contract in China.

Mooy made his debut for the club on 31 July as a late substitute in a 2–0 home win over Aberdeen in the Scottish Premiership. He made his Champions League debut in a 3–0 home loss to defending champions Real Madrid on 6 September, and on 18 September earned his first start for the club in a 2–0 away loss against St Mirren. On 28 December, Mooy scored his first goals for Celtic, leading his side by netting a brace in a 4–0 victory against Hibernian at Easter Road. Mooy went on to provide 6 goals and 6 assists in all competitions by 5 February 2023, after adding a goal and an assist in a 4–1 win over St Johnstone. On 26 February, Mooy started in Celtic's 2–1 victory over Rangers in the League Cup final, contributing to the build-up of the second goal and securing his side's first trophy of the season.

Continuing on his form in the Scottish Cup, on 11 March, Mooy scored the opening goal in a 3–0 quarter finals victory over Hearts. A week later, Celtic announced Mooy's absence due to injury, after carrying "soreness" for a couple of weeks during their tight schedule. He made his return on 8 April, where his side won 3–2 against Rangers. On 7 May, Mooy helped Celtic retain the Scottish Premiership title, achieving a double, after assisting Oh Hyeon-gyu brace to ensure a 2–0 victory against Hearts at Tynecastle. It was Mooy's final appearance for the club, as back problems led to him being ruled out in the Scottish Cup final. Celtic went on to achieve a historic domestic treble, for a record 8th time, following a 3–1 final win over Inverness. Manager Postecoglou departed, and Mooy announced his retirement from professional football on 30 June.

== International career ==
=== 2009–2012: U20 World Cup and Olympic ===
As a dual Australian-Dutch national, Mooy was eligible to play for the national team of either country. In recognition of his performances with the Australia under-20 side, senior manager Pim Verbeek gave Mooy his first call-up for a friendly match against Republic of Ireland on 12 August 2009. He was an unused substitute on the day as Australia won 3–0 at Thomond Park. Returning to the youths, Mooy represented the Australia U20 side in the U-20 World Cup, being benched and playing one group match before starting on 3 October 2009, where he scored the opening goal for his side, a 40-yard free kick, against Brazil in the final group stage match. Australia lost 3–1 at full time, and came last in the group, their worst-ever finish at the tournament.

In June 2011, Mooy was named in the Australia U23 squad under coach Aurelio Vidmar. Ahead of the Olympic Games qualifiers, Australia played two legs, between 19 and 23 June, against Yemen in which Mooy recorded an assist off the bench in a 7–0 aggregate victory that saw the team qualify for the group stage. Australia were knocked out after failing to score a goal throughout the whole group stage; finishing bottom of the group with 4 draws and 2 losses, thus missing the Olympics for the first time since 1984. Mooy declared his desire to represent Australia in December 2011.

=== 2012–2017: Senior debut and World Cup qualifiers ===
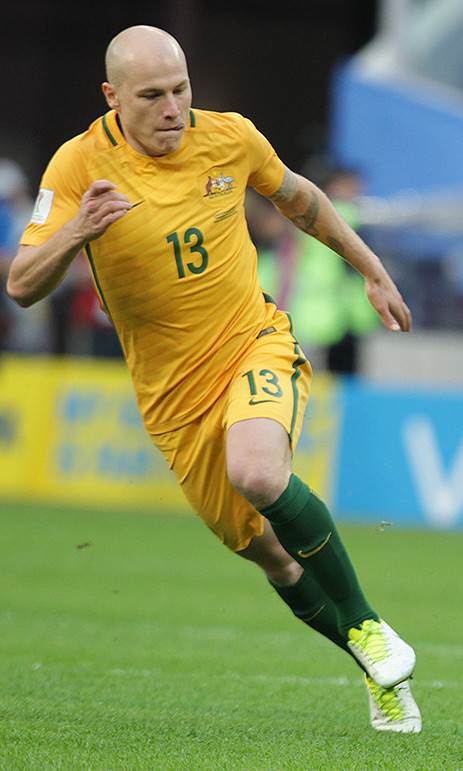
Mooy playing for Australia in 2017

On 7 December 2012, Mooy made his senior debut for Australia at Hong Kong Stadium, scoring the opening goal in a 9–0 victory against Guam in the second preliminary round of the East Asian Cup. Two days later, he scored his second goal for his nation in an 8–0 win against Chinese Taipei, ensuring qualification to the final stage of the competition. Mooy didn't make another senior appearance until he started in the last group match on 28 July 2013, scoring the equaliser in a 4–3 loss to China. Ahead of the 2015 Asian Cup, Mooy was included in the 46-man provisional squad by manager Ange Postecoglou, but was excluded from the final selection and instead participated in a 12-day camp at New York University in Abu Dhabi alongside the other 22 unselected players, playing scheduled friendlies from 11 to 18 January 2015.

Although he missed the opening match in June, Mooy was recalled under Postecoglou despite concerns of his fitness, for the World Cup qualifiers in September. He scored a brace in Australia's 5–0 win over Bangladesh and was involved in their opening goal of a 3–0 victory in their next match against Tajikistan. In the second round of the group stage, now playing as a starter, Mooy assisted once and forced an error from keeper Ruslan Amirov that led to an own goal in a 3–0 win against Kyrgyzstan, before helping The Socceroos top the table after providing a hat-trick of assists for his side in a 4–0 victory against Bangladesh on 17 November. In March 2016, Mooy went on to record 1 goal and 2 assists in the last two matches of the group against Tajikistan (7–0), and Jordan (5–1).

In the next stage of the competition, Mooy started in all group matches, continuing to be the key midfielder to provide his side chances. Australia won their first two games before drawing consecutively in the next three matches; Mooy assisted once during the first half of the group. Following the second round of the group, Mooy assisted the opening goal in a 1–1 draw against Iraq. After a 2–0 win over United Arab Emirates, he assisted the winning goal, a sharp pass to Tom Rogic in the 72nd minute, in a crucial 3–2 win against Saudi Arabia to keep his nation in contention for World Cup qualification. Australia finished the campaign in third place, missing out on direct qualification and facing a battle to qualify through a play-off round. Mooy was involved in the winning goal at extra time, securing a 3–2 aggregate win over Syria to progress to the final round against Honduras on 15 November 2017. After an initial 0–0 draw, Australia won 3–1 in the second leg to ensure qualification for the 2018 World Cup in Russia.

=== 2018–2021: World Cup and pandemic ===
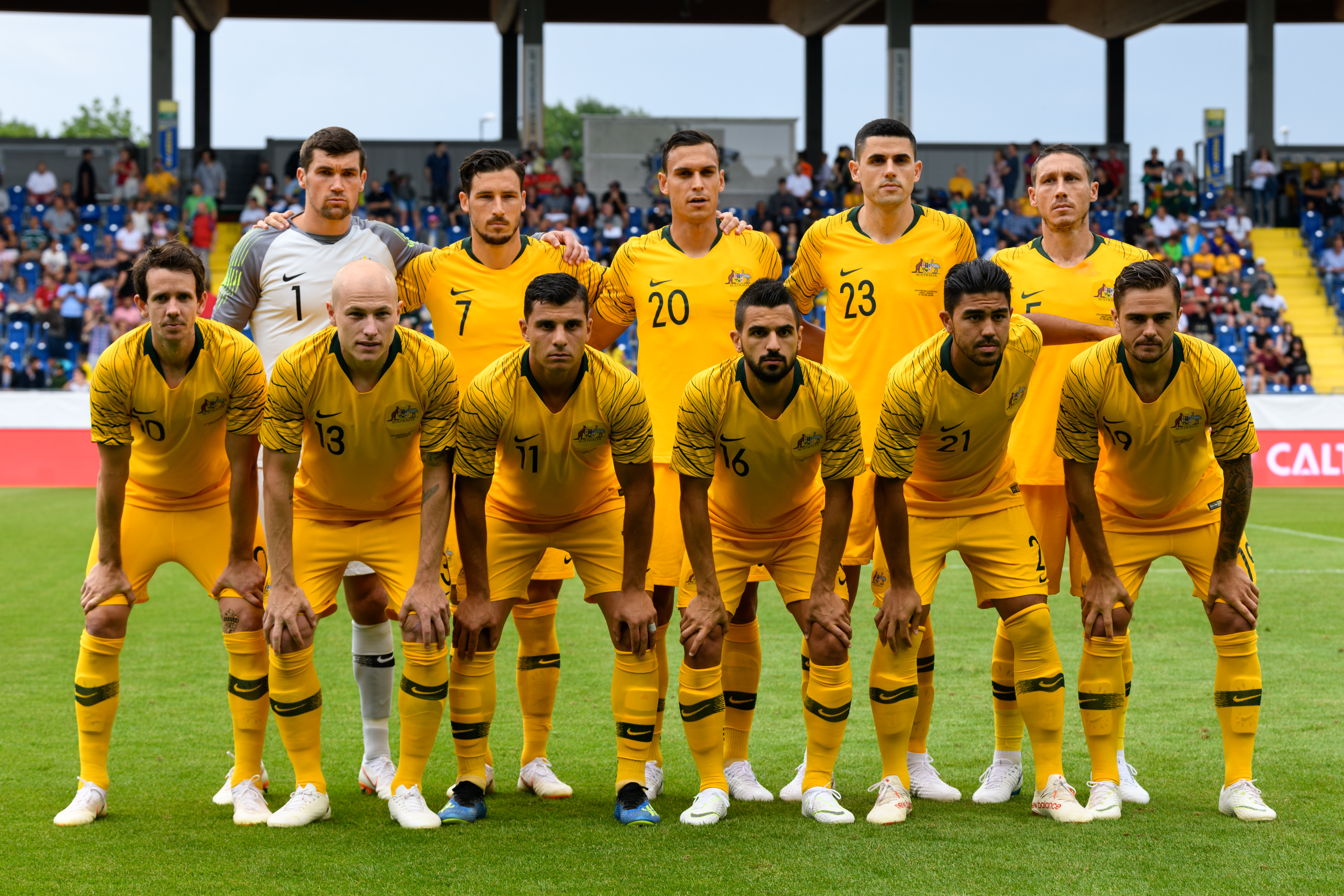
Mooy (second from the left) with Australia in 2018

On 16 June 2018, Mooy made his World Cup debut at Kazan Arena, starting in the opening match against France. He was involved in the lead-up to Australia's penalty goal, which resulted from a free kick being handled by French defender Samuel Umtiti. Mooy's presence in midfield was instrumental in limiting the opposition's scoring opportunities and creating key chances in the attacking front as his side lost 2–1 at full-time. Unfortunately, due to their lack of attacking presence, Australia fell bottom of the group, only able to score their goals from the penalty spot following a 1–1 draw against Denmark and a 2–0 defeat to Peru.

Following the tournament, Mooy would miss the entirety of the Asian Cup campaign in January 2019 due to a torn medial collateral ligament in his right knee which was expected to keep him out for three months. Despite this, he was added into the final squad for the tournament under newly appointed manager Graham Arnold. Mooy made his international return on 10 September, scoring a brace in a 3–0 win over Kuwait in Australia's first match of the 2022 World Cup qualifier. In the following matches, Mooy gathered three assists, helping his side triumph over Nepal and Chinese Taipei to continue their perfect start. After 18-months of no international football due to COVID-19, Mooy made his return with Australia in August 2021 after being added to the 27-man squad set to play in the remaining group matches and third round fixtures. He made his eventual return as a substitute on 2 September in a 3–0 victory over China.

For the remaining matches, Mooy was delegated onto the bench, only to come on to keep possession for his side when in a winning lead. He made his first start, since returning from COVID, for Australia on 12 October in a 2–0 loss to Japan at Saitama Stadium. After his side's loss, Mooy was recalled to his club, Shanghai, to return into quarantine due to the Chinese Government's rules and regulations in the pandemic which interfered with his playing time at international level. As a result, he missed the crucial qualifier matches against Saudi Arabia and China.

=== 2022–2023: Last World Cup and retirement ===
After the end of his club's domestic season, Mooy was called up to Australia in January 2022 for the forthcoming matches of the World Cup qualifier. On 1 February, he scored a goal, his first in three and a half years, for Australia in a 2–2 draw against Oman. Later that year, whilst ignoring his club's request to return, Mooy made his 50th appearance for Australia on 1 June in a friendly match against Jordan. A week later, he started in the crucial match against the United Arab Emirates in the World Cup qualification fourth round after his nation finished third in the group stage of round three; Mooy was involved in the winning goal as his corner was deflected off towards Ajdin Hrustic, whose goal gave Australia the lead in the 84th minute and ensured a 2–1 win at Ahmad bin Ali Stadium. In the play-off final against Peru, a match in which Australia was heavily favoured as the underdog, Mooy played the entire 120 minutes for his nation until the match led into a penalty shootout after 0–0 draw at the end of extra time. He scored the second penalty in the shootout before Australia eventually won 5–4 to secure World Cup qualification to Qatar.

At the 2022 FIFA World Cup, Mooy started in Australia's opening match against France where his side lost 4–1 after being 1–0 in front in the early stages of the match. However, a positive performance from Mooy in the subsequent match against Tunisia inspired his side to keep their 1–0 lead until full time. The win was Australia's first since 2010 against Serbia and first clean sheet in more than 48 years at the world stage. In the final match against Denmark, Mooy continued his good form, playing a pivotal role in midfield to influence a 1–0 win, qualifying to the Round of 16 for the first time since 2006. He started in the match against the eventual champions Argentina which Australia lost 2–1, ending their World Cup campaign.

After the tournament, Mooy missed the "Welcome Home" matches in March 2023 against Ecuador due to back soreness, forcing him to continue recovery in Scotland. His continuous back problem eventually led him to miss the friendly match against Argentina on 15 June. On 30 June, Mooy announced his retirement from professional football – club and international – with immediate effect. He ended his international career with 57 caps and 7 goals for Australia.

== Player profile ==
=== Style of play ===
Mooy was nicknamed the "Pasty Pirlo" and "Aussie Iniesta" for his skillset. He began his professional career as a deep-lying playmaker. As Mooy's career progressed, his playing style evolved. He became a box-to-box midfielder, contributing both defensively and in attack. He played in various midfield roles, including right centre midfield in Shanghai's formations and as a quarterback-like player for Huddersfield, orchestrating the team's attacks.

In terms of attacking contributions, Mooy showcased his goal-scoring ability. He was also capable of making dangerous passes and has impressive vision and passing range, but often chose lower-risk passes. While not known for his physicality, he compensated with his work rate off the ball, contributing to team efforts in pressing and breaking up opponents' play.

Mooy's playing style was characterized by his ball retention, composure, and ability to find space in crowded areas. He was a meticulous passer and often dictated the pace and tempo of the game from a deeper position. His intelligence in movement and positioning allowed him to control and manage matches effectively.

When Mooy played for Celtic under Postecoglou, he fit well into the team's 4-3-3 system as one of the "free eights" in midfield. His networking abilities and precise passing made him a vital asset in advancing the team's play. Mooy compensated for his lack of pace with an ability to protect and carry the ball effectively. His awareness, vision, and set-piece-taking abilities made him a valuable asset in creating scoring opportunities.

=== Reception ===
Mooy has received widespread acclaim for his performances throughout his career, earning recognition as one of Australia's greatest-ever midfielders. His technical ability, defensive qualities, and unique playing style garnered praise from players, coaches, and fans alike.

Huddersfield Town legend Andy Booth, who scored 137 goals for the club, went as far as suggesting that Mooy may be the best player in the club's 109-year history. Booth emphasized Mooy's phenomenal achievements and workload, highlighting his exceptional contributions to the team. David Wagner, former Huddersfield Town manager, praised Mooy for his technical ability and defensive qualities, highlighting the unusual playing style that made him stand out. Pep Guardiola, renowned as one of the top coaches in world football, praised Mooy during his loan spell at Huddersfield Town, describing his performances as "amazing." Even outside the world of football, Mooy gained recognition. Former adult film star Mia Khalifa, a notable West Ham fan, included Mooy in her top three favourite footballers alongside legends Zinedine Zidane and David Beckham.

Mooy's accolades extend beyond club recognition. He was voted and named in Australia's Team of the Century, solidifying his status as one of the country's greatest-ever midfielders. Former Socceroo goalkeeper Mark Bosnich hailed him as the best Australian midfielder playing anywhere in the world during his time at Melbourne City. In addition, former Socceroos boss Ange Postecoglou described Mooy as the best and most exciting player in the A-League.

Mooy's individual achievements are notable as well. He won the PFA Men's Footballer of the Year award three times consecutively from 2015 to 2018, becoming the first player to achieve this feat and the first to win the award in three consecutive seasons. His consistent performances and contributions to his teams did not go unnoticed. Mooy was recognized as the Melbourne City Player of the Year twice consecutively. In his debut season for Huddersfield Town, he was named the club's Player of the Year after leading them to their historic promotion to the top flight. In addition, he was nominated for 2017 Asian Footballer of the Year.

Mooy's impact on Huddersfield Town was further evident in the fans' affection for him. They dedicated a song to Mooy, adapted from the nursery rhyme "Polly Wolly Dolly," sung to the tune of Boney M's "Hooray! Hooray! It's a Holi-Holiday."

== Personal life ==
Mooy's mother Sam has described him as a "quiet soul" who prefers a low-key lifestyle, a characteristic she said comes from his biological father. When he turned 21 during his time in Scotland, Mooy chose to celebrate with his 15-year-old brother, Alex, instead of drinking at a local pub. Mooy's stepfather, Alan Todd, a former rugby league referee, helped his development as a footballer, particularly his ambidextrous abilities.

He married Nicola Mooy in May 2017 (six years after meeting) in Glasgow, just before a play-off final match with Huddersfield Town at Wembley Stadium. The couple has two children: daughter Skylar Mooy, born in 2015, and son Maximilian Andrew Mooy, born in 2018. The family faced challenges when Mooy signed for Shanghai, as his family could not join him due to the COVID-19 pandemic. Mooy described the experience as a valuable life lesson. Mooy dedicated a celebration to his daughter Skylar after scoring his fourth goal for Celtic, forming an "S" gesture, symbolizing her name.

Mooy's cousin, Brodie Mooy, is also a retired professional footballer. His uncle, Paul Cosgrove, is a senior constable police officer at Quakers Hill and his father in law, Ian, is a lifelong Celtic supporter. His brother Alex, who is six years younger than Mooy, played football in the National Premier Leagues, and died in June 2021.

At the age of 16, Mooy had a guardian angel tattooed on his shoulder, symbolizing the support he sought while being away from his family during his early days in Bolton, England. Another tattoo of his features the Dutch words "Leven, Lachen, Liefde" (Live, Love, Laugh), representing his guiding principles. The name "Mooy," which Aaron's grandfather Australianized from "Mooij" after immigrating from Holland to Australia, holds significant meaning to him, representing his connection to his family's roots.

== Career statistics ==
=== Club ===
Appearances and goals by club, season and competition
Club	Season	League			National cup (Note: Includes Scottish Cup, FFA Cup, FA Cup)		League cup (Note: Includes Scottish League Cup, EFL Cup)		Continental		Other		Total	
Club	Season	Division	Apps	Goals	Apps	Goals	Apps	Goals	Apps	Goals	Apps	Goals	Apps	Goals
St Mirren	2010–11	Scottish Premier League	13	0	5	1	0	0	—		—		18	1
St Mirren	2011–12	Scottish Premier League	8	1	4	0	0	0	—		—		12	1
St Mirren	Total		21	1	9	1	0	0	—		—		30	2
Western Sydney Wanderers	2012–13	A-League	23	1	—		—		—		—		23	1
Western Sydney Wanderers	2013–14	A-League	26	3	—		—		5 (Note: Appearances in AFC Champions League)	1	—		31	4
Western Sydney Wanderers	Total		49	4	—		—		5	1	—		54	5
Melbourne City	2014–15	A-League	27	7	1	0	—		—		—		28	7
Melbourne City	2015–16	A-League	26	11	4	6	—		—		—		30	17
Melbourne City	Total		53	18	5	6	—		—		—		58	24
Manchester City	2016–17	Premier League	—		—		—		—		—		—	
Huddersfield Town (loan)	2016–17	Championship	45	4	2	0	1	0	—		3 (Note: Appearances in Championship play-offs)	0	51	4
Huddersfield Town	2017–18	Premier League	36	4	1	0	1	0	—		—		38	4
Huddersfield Town	2018–19	Premier League	29	3	0	0	1	0	—		—		30	3
Huddersfield Town	2019–20	Championship	1	0	0	0	0	0	—		—		1	0
Huddersfield Town	Total		111	11	3	0	3	0	—		3	0	120	11
Brighton & Hove Albion (loan)	2019–20	Premier League	17	2	0	0	1	0	—		—		18	2
Brighton & Hove Albion	2019–20	Premier League	14	0	0	0	0	0	—		—		14	0
Brighton & Hove Albion	Total		31	2	0	0	1	0	—		—		32	2
Shanghai SIPG	2020	Chinese Super League	10	1	1	0	—		6	0	—		17	1
Shanghai SIPG	2021	Chinese Super League	13	5	1	0	—		0	0	—		14	5
Shanghai SIPG	Total		23	6	2	0	—		6	0	—		31	6
Celtic	2022–23	Scottish Premiership	29	4	4	3	4	0	5 (Note: Appearances in UEFA Champions League)	0	—		42	7
Career total			317	46	23	10	8	0	16	1	3	0	367	57

=== International ===
Appearances and goals by national team and year
National team	Year	Apps	Goals
Australia	2012	2	2
Australia	2013	1	1
Australia	2014	1	0
Australia	2015	7	1
Australia	2016	10	1
Australia	2017	10	0
Australia	2018	8	0
Australia	2019	4	1
Australia	2021	4	0
Australia	2022	10	1
Total		57	7

Australia score listed first, score column indicates score after each Mooy goal.

International goals by date, venue, cap, opponent, score, result and competition
No.	Date	Venue	Cap	Opponent	Score	Result	Competition
1	7 December 2012	Hong Kong Stadium, So Kon Po, Hong Kong	1	Guam	1–0	9–0	2013 EAFF East Asian Cup qualification
2	9 December 2012	Hong Kong Stadium, So Kon Po, Hong Kong	2	Chinese Taipei	6–0	8–0	2013 EAFF East Asian Cup qualification
3	28 July 2013	Seoul Olympic Stadium, Seoul, South Korea	3	China	1–1	3–4	2013 EAFF East Asian Cup
4	3 September 2015	Perth Oval, Perth, Australia	7	Bangladesh	5–0	5–0	2018 FIFA World Cup qualification
5	29 March 2016	Sydney Football Stadium, Sydney, Australia	13	Jordan	2–0	5–1	2018 FIFA World Cup qualification
6	10 September 2019	Al Kuwait Sports Club Stadium, Kuwait City, Kuwait	40	Kuwait	3–0	3–0	2022 FIFA World Cup qualification
7	1 February 2022	Sultan Qaboos Sports Complex, Muscat, Oman	49	Oman	2–1	2–2	2022 FIFA World Cup qualification

== Honours ==
Western Sydney Wanderers

- A-League Premiership: 2012–13

Huddersfield Town

- EFL Championship play-offs: 2017

Celtic

- Scottish Premiership: 2022–23
- Scottish Cup: 2022–23
- Scottish League Cup: 2022–23

Individual

- Melbourne City Player of the Year: 2014–15, 2015–16
- PFA A-League Team of the Season: 2014–15, 2015–16
- Fox Sports Alex Tobin Medal: 2014–15
- PFA Footballer of the Year: 2015–16, 2016–17
- EFL Team of the Season: 2016–17
- PFA Team of the Year: 2016–17 Championship
- Huddersfield Town Player of the Year: 2016–17
