= 2016–17 Adelaide United FC season =

Adelaide United
2016–17 season
- Chairman: Greg Griffin
- Manager: Guillermo Amor
- Stadium: Coopers Stadium, Adelaide
- A-League: 9th
- A-League Finals Series: DNQ
- FFA Cup: Round of 32
- AFC Champions League: Group stage
- Top goalscorer: League: Dylan McGowan (4 goals); All: Dylan McGowan, Baba Diawara (5 goals)
- Highest home attendance: 14,908 vs Melbourne Victory; 22 October 2016
- Lowest home attendance: 6,006 vs Perth Glory; 10 February 2017
- Average home league attendance: 9,565
Home colours	Away colours	Third colours

The 2016–17 Adelaide United FC season was the club's 13th season since its establishment in 2003. The club participated in the A-League for the 12th time, the FFA Cup for the 3rd time, as well as the AFC Champions League for the 6th time.

== Players ==
=== Squad information ===
Note: Flags indicate national team as defined under FIFA eligibility rules; some limited exceptions apply. Players may hold more than one non-FIFA nationality.

No.	Pos.	Nation	Player
1	GK	AUS	Eugene Galekovic (Captain)
2	DF	AUS	Michael Marrone
3	MF	ITA	Iacopo La Rocca
4	DF	AUS	Dylan McGowan
5	DF	AUS	Taylor Regan
7	MF	KOR	Kim Jae-sung
8	MF	ESP	Isaías
9	FW	SEN	Baba Diawara
10	MF	ARG	Marcelo Carrusca
11	FW	ESP	Sergio Cirio
12	DF	AUS	Mark Ochieng
13	FW	AUS	Marc Marino
14	MF	AUS	George Mells

No.	Pos.	Nation	Player
15	DF	AUS	Ben Warland
16	MF	AUS	Jesse Makarounas
17	MF	AUS	Nikola Mileusnic
18	MF	AUS	Riley McGree
19	DF	AUS	Ben Garuccio
20	GK	AUS	John Hall
21	DF	AUS	Tarek Elrich
22	MF	AUS	Ryan Kitto
23	DF	AUS	Jordan Elsey
24	MF	AUS	Jordan O'Doherty
30	GK	AUS	Daniel Margush
92	FW	AUS	Eli Babalj

== Transfers ==
=== Transfers in ===
No.	Position	Player	Transferred from	Type/fee	Contract length	Date	Ref
22	MF	Ryan Kitto	Unattached	Free transfer	1 year	23 May 2016	
13	FW	Marc Marino	Unattached	Free transfer	2 years	23 May 2016	
19	DF	Ben Garuccio	Melbourne City	Free transfer	2 years	16 June 2016	
16	MF	Jesse Makarounas	Unattached	Free transfer	1 year	11 July 2016	
7	FW	(Brazil) Henrique	(Malaysia) Negeri Sembilan	Free transfer	1 year	27 August 2016	
17	MF	Nikola Mileusnic	(Australia) Adelaide City	Free transfer	1 year	30 August 2016	
9	FW	(Spain) Sergi Guardiola	(Spain) Granada	Loan	1 year	14 September 2016	
25	MF	James Holland	Unattached	Free transfer	2 years	21 September 2016	
45	FW	(South Korea) Danny Choi	(Australia) Blacktown City	Loan	6 months	4 October 2016	
5	DF	Taylor Regan	Unattached	Free transfer	1 year	12 October 2018	
7	MF	(South Korea) Kim Jae-sung	(South Korea) Seoul E-Land	Free transfer	1 year	7 February 2017	
92	FW	Eli Babalj	Unattached	Free transfer	1 year	7 February 2017	
9	FW	(Senegal) Baba Diawara	Unattached	Free transfer	2 years	7 February 2017	

=== Transfers out ===
No.	Position	Player	Transferred to	Type/fee	Date	Ref
19	FW	Eli Babalj	(Netherlands) AZ	Loan return	5 May 2016	
24	MF	Bruce Kamau	Melbourne City	Free transfer	5 May 2016	
7	FW	Pablo Sánchez	Unattached	Free transfer	7 May 2016	
16	MF	Craig Goodwin	(Netherlands) Sparta Rotterdam	Free transfer	10 May 2016	
25	DF	Ruon Tongyik	Melbourne City	Free transfer	8 July 2016	
6	MF	Stefan Mauk	(Netherlands) N.E.C.	$400,000	19 July 2016	
11	FW	Bruce Djite	(South Korea) Suwon FC	Free transfer	26 July 2016	
17	FW	Mate Dugandzic	(Australia) Dandenong City	Free transfer	28 October 2016	
45	FW	(South Korea) Danny Choi	Unattached	Free transfer	8 November 2016	
25	MF	James Holland	(China) Liaoning Whowin	Undisclosed Fee	12 January 2017	
9	FW	(Spain) Sergi Guardiola	(Spain) Granada	Loan return	25 January 2017	
7	FW	(Brazil) Henrique	(Thailand) Chiangrai United	Free transfer	31 January 2017	

=== From youth squad ===
N	Pos.	Nat.	Name	Age	Notes
24	MF	(Australia)	Jordan O'Doherty	18	
18	MF	(Australia)	Riley McGree	17	
12	DF	(Australia)	Mark Ochieng	19	

=== Contract extensions ===
Name	Position	Duration	Contract Expiry	Notes
(Australia) Dylan McGowan	Defender	1 year	2017	
(Australia) Mark Ochieng	Right-back	1 year	2017	
(Australia) Ben Warland	Defender	1 year	2017	
(Spain) Isaías	Midfielder	3 years	2020	
(Australia) Michael Marrone	Right-back	2 years	2019	
(Australia) Taylor Regan	Centre back	2 years	2019	

=== Technical staff ===
Position	Staff
Head coach	(Spain) Guillermo Amor
Assistant coach	(Spain) Pau Martí
Assistant coach	(Australia) Jacobo Ramallo
High Performance Manager	(Australia) Greg King
Goalkeeper coach	(Australia) Peter Blazincic
Youth team coach	(Australia) Hussein Skenderovic
Physiotherapist	(Australia) Harry Truong

=== Kits and Sponsors ===
Kit manufacturer	Sponsor(s)	
Macron	Major Sponsor	IGA
Macron	Sleeve	TBA
Macron	Back of Shirt	Datong Australia
Macron	Front of Shorts	The Castle Tavern
Macron	Back of Shorts	TBA

Home	Away	Third

== Statistics ==
=== Squad statistics ===
N	Pos.	Nat.	Name	Total					A-League					FFA Cup					AFC Champions League
N	Pos.	Nat.	Name	Apps	Goals	Yellow card	Second yellow card	Red card	Apps	Goals	Yellow card	Second yellow card	Red card	Apps	Goals	Yellow card	Second yellow card	Red card	Apps	Goals	Yellow card	Second yellow card	Red card
1	GK	(Australia)	Eugene Galekovic	28	0	0	0	0	23+0	0	0	0	0	1+0	0	0	0	0	4+0	0	0	0	0
2	DF	(Australia)	Michael Marrone	17	0	2	0	0	11+1	0	0	0	0	0+0	0	0	0	0	5+0	0	2	0	0
3	MF	(Italy)	Iacopo La Rocca	19	0	2	0	0	17+1	0	2	0	0	1+0	0	0	0	0	0+0	0	0	0	0
4	DF	(Australia)	Dylan McGowan	33	5	7	0	0	27+0	4	5	0	0	1+0	0	0	0	0	5+0	1	2	0	0
5	DF	(Australia)	Taylor Regan	16	0	6	0	0	9+2	0	3	0	0	0+0	0	0	0	0	5+0	0	3	0	0
7	MF	(South Korea)	Kim Jae-sung	13	1	2	0	0	4+3	0	1	0	0	0+0	0	0	0	0	6+0	1	1	0	0
8	MF	(Spain)	Isaías	26	1	10	0	0	22+0	1	10	0	0	1+0	0	0	0	0	3+0	0	0	0	0
9	FW	(Senegal)	Baba Diawara	13	5	2	0	0	6+1	3	1	0	0	0+0	0	0	0	0	5+1	2	1	0	0
10	MF	(Argentina)	Marcelo Carrusca	20	2	2	1	0	16+3	2	2	1	0	1+0	0	0	0	0	0+0	0	0	0	0
11	FW	(Spain)	Sergio Cirio	26	3	2	0	0	19+1	1	2	0	0	0+0	0	0	0	0	6+0	2	0	0	0
12	DF	(Australia)	Mark Ochieng	15	2	1	0	0	3+5	1	1	0	0	0+1	0	0	0	0	2+4	1	0	0	0
13	FW	(Australia)	Marc Marino	6	0	0	0	0	1+5	0	0	0	0	0+0	0	0	0	0	0+0	0	0	0	0
14	MF	(Australia)	George Mells	6	0	0	0	0	3+3	0	0	0	0	0+0	0	0	0	0	0+0	0	0	0	0
15	DF	(Australia)	Ben Warland	4	0	1	0	0	1+0	0	0	0	0	0+1	0	0	0	0	1+1	0	1	0	0
16	MF	(Australia)	Jesse Makarounas	13	1	2	0	0	7+3	1	2	0	0	1+0	0	0	0	0	0+2	0	0	0	0
17	MF	(Australia)	Nikola Mileusnic	23	1	1	0	0	7+10	1	0	0	0	0+0	0	0	0	0	6+0	0	1	0	0
18	MF	(Australia)	Riley McGree	22	2	6	0	0	11+5	1	4	0	0	1+0	0	0	0	0	5+0	1	2	0	0
19	DF	(Australia)	Ben Garuccio	33	0	7	0	0	24+3	0	6	0	0	1+0	0	0	0	0	4+1	0	1	0	0
20	GK	(Australia)	John Hall	4	0	0	0	0	2+1	0	0	0	0	0+0	0	0	0	0	1+0	0	0	0	0
21	DF	(Australia)	Tarek Elrich	29	2	6	0	0	24+1	2	6	0	0	1+0	0	0	0	0	3+0	0	0	0	0
22	MF	(Australia)	Ryan Kitto	18	1	1	0	0	8+8	0	1	0	0	1+0	1	0	0	0	0+1	0	0	0	0
23	DF	(Australia)	Jordan Elsey	1	0	0	0	0	0+0	0	0	0	0	1+0	0	0	0	0	0+0	0	0	0	0
24	MF	(Australia)	Jordan O'Doherty	23	2	2	1	0	10+7	1	0	1	0	0+1	0	0	0	0	4+1	1	2	0	0
26	MF	(Australia)	Lachlan Brook	1	0	0	0	0	0+0	0	0	0	0	0+0	0	0	0	0	0+1	0	0	0	0
30	GK	(Australia)	Daniel Margush	3	0	0	0	0	2+0	0	0	0	0	0+0	0	0	0	0	1+0	0	0	0	0
92	FW	(Australia)	Eli Babalj	8	1	1	0	0	1+3	0	1	0	0	0+0	0	0	0	0	0+4	1	0	0	0
Players no longer at the club:
7	MF	(Brazil)	Henrique	13	3	2	0	0	12+1	3	2	0	0	0	0	0	0	0	0	0	0	0	0
9	FW	(Spain)	Sergi Guardiola	16	3	2	0	0	14+2	3	2	0	0	0	0	0	0	0	0	0	0	0	0
25	MF	(Australia)	James Holland	13	0	1	0	0	13	0	1	0	0	0	0	0	0	0	0	0	0	0	0
45	FW	(South Korea)	Danny Choi	2	0	0	0	0	0+2	0	0	0	0	0	0	0	0	0	0	0	0	0	0

- Last updated: 9 May 2017
- Source: au.soccerway.com
- (yellow card) = Number of bookings; (second yellow card) = Number of sending offs after a second yellow card; (red card) = Number of sending offs by a direct red card.

== Pre-season and friendlies ==
17 July 2016	Northern Demons (Australia)	0–5	(Australia) Adelaide United	Port Pirie, Australia
14:30 ACST		Report	Marino 45'; Ochieng 52'; Djite 80'; Mullen 86'; Elrich 89'	Stadium: Byrne Park; Attendance: 2,000; Referee: Rick Schneider

17 August 2016	Melbourne City (Australia)	1–0	(Australia) Adelaide United	Melbourne, Australia
	Fornaroli 15' (pen.)	Report		Stadium: City Football Academy; Attendance: 0 (behind closed doors)

30 August 2016 Malaysia tour	Kuala Lumpur FA (Malaysia)	0–3	(Australia) Adelaide United	Shah Alam, Malaysia
21:00 MYT		Report	McGree 7'; Marino 11'; Kitto 90+'	Stadium: Sime Darby Football Field

3 September 2016 Malaysia tour	Penang FA (Malaysia)	1–2	(Australia) Adelaide United	George Town, Malaysia
21:00 MYT	Ghazli 42'	Report	Marino 34'; Henrique 82' (pen.)	Stadium: City Stadium; Attendance: 2,500

14 September 2016	Adelaide United (Australia)	0–1	(Australia) Melbourne Victory	Adelaide, Australia
14:30 ACST		Report	Rojas 9'	Stadium: Coopers Stadium; Attendance: 0 (behind closed doors)

29 September 2016	Sydney FC (Australia)	1–0	(Australia) Adelaide United	Sydney, Australia
15:00 AEST	Brillante 38'	Report		Stadium: Allianz Stadium; Attendance: 0 (behind closed doors)

== Competitions ==
=== Overview ===
Competition	First match	Last match	Starting round	Final position	Record							
Competition	First match	Last match	Starting round	Final position	Pld	W	D	L	GF	GA	GD	Win %
A-League	9 October 2016	15 April 2017	Matchday 1	9th	27	5	8	14	25	46	−21	18.52
FFA Cup	4 August 2015	7 November 2015	Round of 32	Round of 32	1	0	0	1	1	2	−1	0.00
AFC Champions League	22 February 2017	9 May 2017	Group stage	Group stage (3rd)	6	1	2	3	10	13	−3	16.67
Total					34	6	10	18	36	61	−25	17.65

Source: Competitions

=== A-League ===
==== League table ====
Pos	Team	Pld	W	D	L	GF	GA	GD	Pts	Qualification
1	Sydney FC (C)	27	20	6	1	55	12	+43	66	Qualification for 2018 AFC Champions League group stage and Finals series
2	Melbourne Victory	27	15	4	8	49	31	+18	49	Qualification for 2018 AFC Champions League group stage and Finals series
3	Brisbane Roar	27	11	9	7	43	37	+6	42	Qualification for 2018 AFC Champions League second preliminary round and Finals series
4	Melbourne City	27	11	6	10	49	44	+5	39	Qualification for Finals series
5	Perth Glory	27	10	9	8	53	53	0	39	Qualification for Finals series
6	Western Sydney Wanderers	27	8	12	7	35	35	0	36	Qualification for Finals series
7	Wellington Phoenix (Note: Wellington Phoenix cannot qualify for the AFC Champions League as they are not recognised as an AFC club.)	27	8	6	13	41	46	−5	30	
8	Central Coast Mariners	27	6	5	16	31	52	−21	23	
9	Adelaide United	27	5	8	14	25	46	−21	23	
10	Newcastle Jets	27	5	7	15	28	53	−25	22	

Source: A-Leagues
Rules for classification: 1) points; 2) goal difference; 3) number of goals scored.
(C) Champions

==== Results summary ====
Overall								Home						Away					
Pld	W	D	L	GF	GA	GD	Pts	W	D	L	GF	GA	GD	W	D	L	GF	GA	GD
27	5	8	14	25	46	−21	23	4	4	6	16	25	−9	1	4	8	9	21	−12

Last updated: 15 April 2017.
Source: ultimatealeague.com

==== Results by round ====
Round	1	2	3	4	5	6	7	8	9	10	11	12	13	14	15	16	17	18	19	20	21	22	23	24	25	26	27
Ground	A	H	H	A	H	H	A	A	H	A	A	H	A	H	H	A	H	A	H	H	A	A	H	A	H	A	H
Result	D	L	L	L	L	D	L	D	W	L	L	L	D	L	W	L	D	L	L	W	L	D	W	W	D	L	D
Position	5	6	8	9	10	10	10	10	8	10	10	10	10	10	9	9	10	10	10	10	10	10	10	9	8	9	9

Updated to match(es) played on 15 April 2017. Source: ultimatealeague.com
A = Away; H = Home; W = Win; D = Draw; L = Loss

==== Matches ====
9 October 2016 1	Newcastle Jets	1–1	Adelaide United	Newcastle
17:00 AEDT	W. Brown 17'	Report	Makarounas 29'	Stadium: McDonald Jones Stadium; Attendance: 9,145; Referee: Alan Milliner

14 October 2016 2	Adelaide United	1–2	Western Sydney Wanderers	Adelaide
19:20 ACDT	Henrique 43'	Report	Šantalab 67', 90+2'	Stadium: Coopers Stadium; Attendance: 14,789; Referee: Shaun Evans

22 October 2016 3	Adelaide United	1–2	Melbourne Victory	Adelaide
19:20 ACDT	Elrich 68'	Report	Berisha 20'; Rojas 90+3'	Stadium: Coopers Stadium; Attendance: 14,908; Referee: Peter Green

28 October 2016 4	Melbourne City	2–1	Adelaide United	Melbourne
19:50 AEDT	Fornaroli 11', 56' (pen.)	Report	Guardiola 64'	Stadium: AAMI Park; Attendance: 10,053; Referee: Chris Beath

6 November 2016 5	Adelaide United	1–2	Central Coast Mariners	Adelaide
16:30 ACDT	Guardiola 27' (pen.)	Report	O'Donovan 47'; Pain 57'	Stadium: Coopers Stadium; Attendance: 10,974; Referee: Jarred Gillett

11 November 2016 6	Adelaide United	1–1	Brisbane Roar	Adelaide
19:20 ACDT	Guardiola 78'	Report	Holman 60'	Stadium: Coopers Stadium; Attendance: 9,146; Referee: Chris Beath

18 November 2016 7	Perth Glory	3–1	Adelaide United	Perth
19:00 AWST	Ro. Griffiths 25'; Keogh 67', 90+5'	Report	Risdon 22' (o.g.)	Stadium: nib Stadium; Attendance: 10,011; Referee: Jarred Gillett

26 November 2016 8	Sydney FC	0–0	Adelaide United	Sydney
19:50 AEDT		Report		Stadium: Allianz Stadium; Attendance: 13,179; Referee: Kris Griffiths-Jones

4 December 2016 9	Adelaide United	2–0	Wellington Phoenix	Adelaide
18:30 ACDT	Henrique 26', 39'	Report		Stadium: Coopers Stadium; Attendance: 8,539; Referee: Stephen Lucas

11 December 2016 10	Brisbane Roar	4–0	Adelaide United	Brisbane
16:00 AEST	Kristensen 28', 30'; Broich 55'; Maclaren 85' (pen.)	Report		Stadium: Suncorp Stadium; Attendance: 15,605; Referee: Peter Green

16 December 2016 11	Newcastle Jets	2–1	Adelaide United	Newcastle
19:50 AEDT	Nabbout 29'; Nordstrand 90+3'	Report	Isaías 68'	Stadium: McDonald Jones Stadium; Attendance: 5,642; Referee: Shaun Evans

26 December 2016 12	Adelaide United	0–4	Sydney FC	Adelaide
19:20 ACDT		Report	Hološko 34'; Brosque 53', 66'; R. Grant 64'	Stadium: Coopers Stadium; Attendance: 11,805; Referee: Chris Beath

1 January 2017 13	Wellington Phoenix	0–0	Adelaide United	Wellington
19:35 NZDT		Report		Stadium: Westpac Stadium; Attendance: 5,548; Referee: Matthew Conger

7 January 2017 14	Adelaide United	0–2	Melbourne Victory	Adelaide
19:20 ACDT		Report	Troisi 22'; Berisha 68'	Stadium: Coopers Stadium; Attendance: 10,036; Referee: Adam Fielding

12 January 2017 15	Adelaide United	2–1	Melbourne City	Adelaide
19:20 ACDT	McGowan 10'; Ochieng 87'	Report	Fornaroli 4'	Stadium: Coopers Stadium; Attendance: 10,607; Referee: Jonathan Barreiro

20 January 2017 16	Sydney FC	2–0	Adelaide United	Sydney
19:50 AEDT	Brosque 58'; Ninković 60'	Report		Stadium: Allianz Stadium; Attendance: 11,225; Referee: Shaun Evans

29 January 2017 17	Adelaide United	2–2	Wellington Phoenix	Adelaide
16:30 ACDT	McGree 7'; Mileusnic 80'	Report	Doyle 11'; Krishna 37'	Stadium: Coopers Stadium; Attendance: 8,313; Referee: Peter Green

5 February 2017 18	Central Coast Mariners	2–1	Adelaide United	Canberra
17:00 AEDT	Ferreira 37'; Appiah 79'	Report	O'Doherty 90+2'	Stadium: GIO Stadium; Attendance: 5,072; Referee: Shaun Evans

10 February 2017 19	Adelaide United	0–5	Perth Glory	Adelaide
20:20 ACDT		Report	La Rocca 15' (o.g.); Castro 37', 88'; Keogh 45+1'; Taggart 46'	Stadium: Coopers Stadium; Attendance: 6,006; Referee: Chris Beath

17 February 2017 20	Adelaide United	1–0	Newcastle Jets	Adelaide
19:20 ACDT	Carrusca 61' (pen.)	Report		Stadium: Coopers Stadium; Attendance: 6,642; Referee: Kurt Ams

25 February 2017 21	Melbourne Victory	2–1	Adelaide United	Melbourne
19:50 AEDT	Rojas 66'; Berisha 82'	Report	Elrich 90'	Stadium: AAMI Park; Attendance: 19,035; Referee: Matthew Conger

4 March 2017 22	Western Sydney Wanderers	0–0	Adelaide United	Sydney
19:50 AEDT		Report		Stadium: Spotless Stadium; Attendance: 8,965; Referee: Kris Griffiths-Jones

19 March 2017 23	Adelaide United	2–1	Brisbane Roar	Adelaide
16:30 ACDT	Diawara 16'; Cirio 90+8' (pen.)	Report	Maclaren 60'	Stadium: Coopers Stadium; Attendance: 7,197; Referee: Stephen Lucas

25 March 2017 24	Central Coast Mariners	2–3	Adelaide United	Gosford
17:35 AEDT	Appiah 44'; O'Donovan 90' (pen.)	Report	Diawara 56', 66'; McGowan 61'	Stadium: Central Coast Stadium; Attendance: 5,438; Referee: Kurt Ams

31 March 2017 25	Adelaide United	1–1	Perth Glory	Adelaide
19:20 ACDT	McGowan 23'	Report	Castro 45+1' (pen.)	Stadium: Coopers Stadium; Attendance: 7,307; Referee: Alan Milliner

7 April 2017 26	Melbourne City	1–0	Adelaide United	Melbourne
19:50 AEST	Cahill 36'	Report		Stadium: AAMI Park; Attendance: 9,438; Referee: Kris Griffiths-Jones

15 April 2017 27	Adelaide United	2–2	Western Sydney Wanderers	Adelaide
19:20 ACST	Carrusca 10' (pen.); McGowan 38'	Report	Dimas 63'; Lustica 74'	Stadium: Coopers Stadium; Attendance: 7,636; Referee: Chris Beath

=== FFA Cup ===
3 August 2016 Round of 32	Redlands United (Queensland)	2–1	(South Australia) Adelaide United	Brisbane
19:30 AEST	Lee 90+4'; O'Brien 98'	Report	Kitto 62'	Stadium: Perry Park; Attendance: 1,564; Referee: Adam Kersey

=== AFC Champions League ===
==== Group stage ====
Pos	Team	Pld	W	D	L	GF	GA	GD	Pts	Qualification
1	(China) Jiangsu Suning	6	5	0	1	9	3	+6	15	Advance to knockout stage
2	(South Korea) Jeju United	6	3	1	2	12	9	+3	10	Advance to knockout stage
3	(Australia) Adelaide United	6	1	2	3	10	13	−3	5	
4	(Japan) Gamba Osaka	6	1	1	4	7	13	−6	4	

Source: AFC
Rules for classification: Group stage tiebreakers

22 February 2017 1	Adelaide United (Australia)	0–3	(Japan) Gamba Osaka	Adelaide, Australia
19:30 ACDT		Report	Nagasawa 21'; Konno 45+1'; McGowan 81' (o.g.)	Stadium: Hindmarsh Stadium; Attendance: 5,071; Referee: Fahad Al-Mirdasi (Saudi Arabia)

1 March 2017 2	Jiangsu Suning (China)	2–1	(Australia) Adelaide United	Nanjing, China
19:35 CST	Teixeira 14', 72'	Report	Babalj 90+2'	Stadium: Nanjing Olympic Sports Centre; Attendance: 41,033; Referee: Ravshan Irmatov (Uzbekistan)

15 March 2017 3	Adelaide United (Australia)	3–3	(South Korea) Jeju United	Adelaide, Australia
19:30 ACDT	Diawara 51' (pen.); Cirio 73'; Ochieng 85'	Report	Mendy 61'; Toscano 71'; S.H. Kwon 84'	Stadium: Hindmarsh Stadium; Attendance: 3,539; Referee: Khamis Al-Marri (Qatar)

11 April 2017 4	Jeju United (South Korea)	1–3	(Australia) Adelaide United	Seogwipo, South Korea
20:00 KST	Magno Cruz 8'	Report	Kim 7'; McGowan 50'; McGree 65'	Stadium: Jeju World Cup Stadium; Attendance: 2,289; Referee: Ali Abdulnabi (Bahrain)

25 April 2017 5	Gamba Osaka (Japan)	3–3	(Australia) Adelaide United	Suita, Japan
19:00 JST	Nagasawa 6'; Doan 12'; Marrone 77' (o.g.)	Report	Cirio 43'; O'Doherty 54'; Diawara 90+2'	Stadium: Suita City Football Stadium; Attendance: 9,209; Referee: Alireza Faghani (Iran)

9 May 2017 6	Adelaide United (Australia)	0–1	(China) Jiangsu Suning	Adelaide, Australia
19:30 ACST		Report	Ji 82'	Stadium: Hindmarsh Stadium; Attendance: 6,797; Referee: Mohammed Abdulla Hassan Mohamed (United Arab Emirates)
