= Marc Marino =

Australian soccer player

Personal information
- Full name: Marc Marino
- Date of birth: 30 April 1996 (age 30)
- Place of birth: Adelaide, Australia
- Height: 1.79 m (5 ft 10 in)
- Position: Forward

Team information
- Current team: Campbelltown City
- Number: 9

Youth career
- 2011–2012: FFSA NTC
- 2012–2014: FFA CoE
- 2014–2016: Melbourne City

Senior career*
Years	Team	Apps	(Gls)
2013	AIS	21	(16)
2014	Campbelltown City	16	(2)
2014–2016	Melbourne City	9	(2)
2015–2016	Melbourne City NPL	6	(7)
2016–2017	Adelaide United	6	(0)
2016	Adelaide United NPL	4	(1)
2017–	Campbelltown City	151	(84)

International career^{‡}
2014	Australia U20	3	(2)
- * Club domestic league appearances and goals as of 9 September 2024 ‡ National team caps and goals as of 1 March 2014

Marc Marino (born 30 April 1996) is an Australian professional footballer who plays a centre forward for National Premier Leagues club Campbelltown City.

== Career ==
Born in Adelaide, Marino first came to national prominence when he was signed up for the Australian Institute of Sport to play in the National Youth League for the 2012–13 season. Recording six goals in his first season and eight in his second, his first-year performances were good enough to earn him an invitation to train with Adelaide United for two weeks in August 2013. A contract was not forthcoming, however, and after returning to AIS for his second season, he was instead signed up by Melbourne City on 18 August 2014.

Marino did not have to wait long for his senior debut, being brought on in the first league game of the season, a match against Sydney FC on 11 October 2014, replacing Mate Dugandzic in the 73rd minute. He scored in his next game against the Brisbane Roar.

Marc Marino sustained a serious knee injury on 4 September 2015 in a 5-0 pre-season win over North Geelong Warriors FC, a game in which he scored the opening goal. Marino was released by Melbourne City on 28 April 2016.

On 23 May 2016, Marino signed with hometown club Adelaide United. At the end of Adelaide's 2016–17 season, Marino rejoined Campbelltown City following the expiry of his contract, but nonetheless returned to Adelaide United for pre-season training under new coach Marco Kurz.

== Career statistics ==
As of 28 April 2016

Club	Season	League			Cup		Continental		Total	
Club	Season	Division	Apps	Goals	Apps	Goals	Apps	Goals	Apps	Goals
Australian Institute of Sport	2013	Victorian Premier League	8	3	0	0	–		8	3
Campbelltown City	2014	NPL South Australia	16	2	0	0	–		16	2
Melbourne City	2014–15	A-League	5	1	0	0	–		5	1
Melbourne City	2015–16	A-League	4	1	0	0	–		4	1
Melbourne City	City Total		9	2	0	0	0	0	9	2
Total			33	7	0	0	0	0	33	7
