= Hernan Espindola =

Footballer (born 1994)

Personal information
- Date of birth: 19 October 1994 (age 32)
- Place of birth: Buenos Aires, Argentina
- Height: 1.67 m (5 ft 6 in)
- Positions: Winger; attacking midfielder

Team information
- Current team: Albion Rovers

Youth career
- 2010–2011: AIS
- 2011–2013: Melbourne Victory
- 2013–: Melbourne City

Senior career*
Years	Team	Apps	(Gls)
2013	Melbourne Victory	0	(0)
2013	Pascoe Vale	10	(0)
2014	Goulburn Valley	16	(0)
2015	Melbourne City NPL	21	(6)
2015–2016	Melbourne City	4	(0)
2016	Hume City	15	(1)
2017–2020	St Albans Saints	66	(2)
2021	North Sunshine Eagles	7	(0)
2022–	Albion Rovers	21	(2)

International career
2011	Australia U17	4	(0)
- * Club domestic league appearances and goals as of 6 December 2022

Hernan Espindola (born 19 October 1994) is a professional footballer who plays as a winger for St. Albans Saints in the NPL Victoria. Born in Argentina, he is a former youth international for Australia.

He played youth football with A-League clubs Melbourne Victory and Melbourne City. In the 2015–16 season he signed a short-term senior contract with Melbourne City.

On 5 February 2016, Espindola joined Hume City.
