= Nick Symeoy =

Australian soccer player

Personal information
- Full name: Nicholas Symeoy
- Date of birth: 3 June 1994 (age 32)
- Place of birth: Australia
- Position: Defender

Team information
- Current team: Green Gully

Youth career
- –2013: Moreland Zebras
- 2014–2015: Melbourne City

Senior career*
Years	Team	Apps	(Gls)
2012–2014	Moreland Zebras	50	(9)
2015	Melbourne City NPL	14	(1)
2015	Melbourne City	2	(0)
2016–2017	Avondale FC	50	(3)
2017–2018	Green Gully	13	(0)
2018–	Brunswick Juventus	66	(2)
- * Club domestic league appearances and goals as of 18 November 2022

Nick Symeoy is an Australian footballer who plays as a defender for Green Gully in the National Premier Leagues Victoria.
