= Harry Novillo =

Martiniquais professional footballer (born 1992)

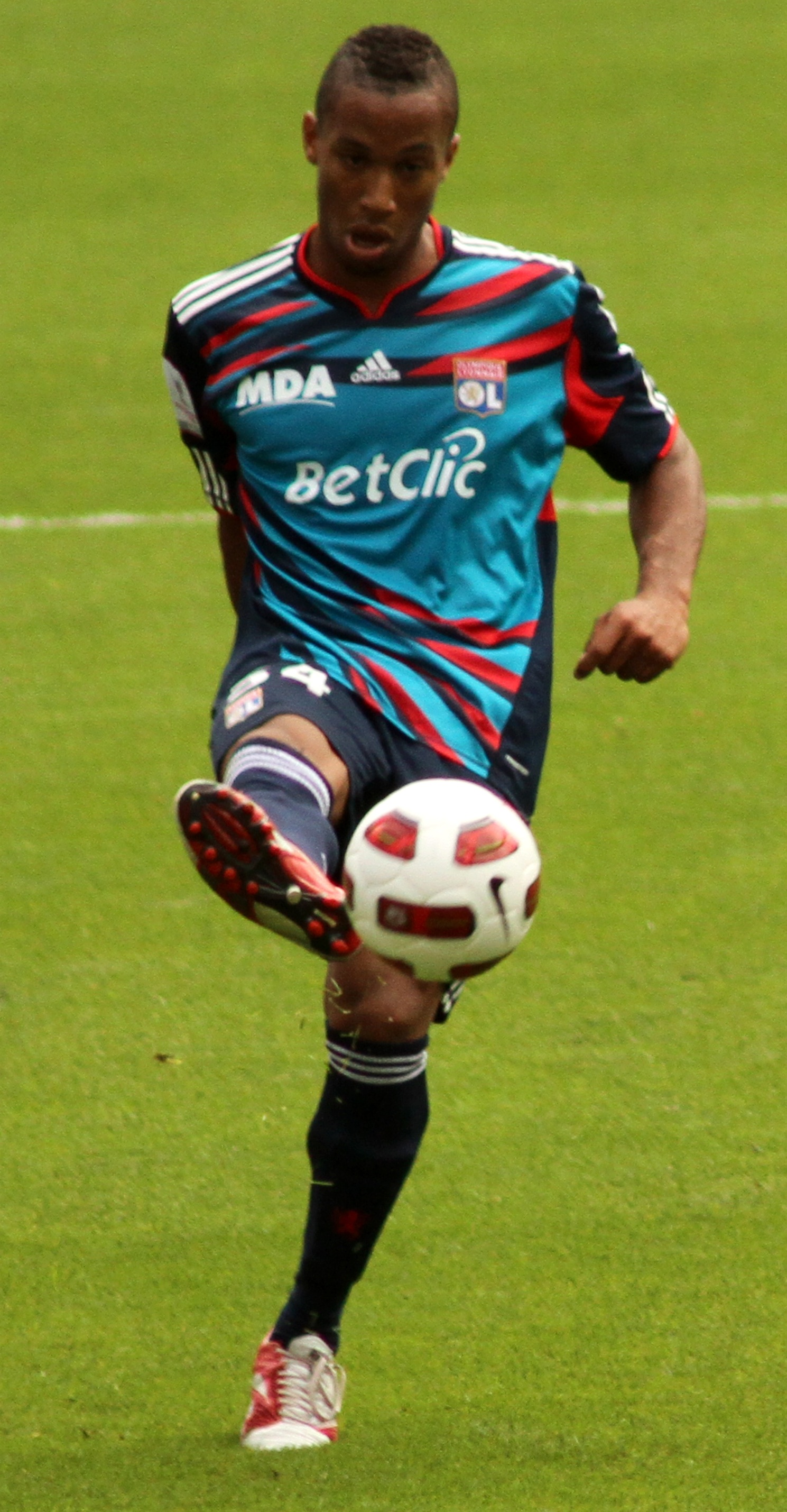
- Novillo playing for Lyon in 2010

Personal information
- Full name: Harry Christopher Novillo
- Date of birth: 11 February 1992 (age 34)
- Place of birth: Lyon, France
- Height: 1.82 m (6 ft 0 in)
- Positions: Winger; forward

Youth career
- 1998–1999: Saint-Fons
- 1999–2010: Lyon

Senior career*
Years	Team	Apps	(Gls)
2010–2013	Lyon II	33	(12)
2010–2013	Lyon	2	(0)
2011–2012	→ Le Havre (loan)	16	(1)
2012	→ Le Havre II (loan)	3	(2)
2013	→ Gazélec Ajaccio (loan)	7	(2)
2013–2014	Mons	22	(0)
2014–2015	Clermont	12	(2)
2014	Clermont II	3	(3)
2015–2016	Melbourne City	31	(13)
2016–2017	Manisaspor	6	(0)
2017–2018	Baniyas	13	(10)
2018	Johor Darul Ta'zim	3	(1)
2019	Montreal Impact	11	(1)
2020	Al Urooba	15	(5)
2021	Fréjus Saint-Raphaël	2	(0)

International career^{‡}
2008–2009	France U17	2	(0)
2010–2011	France U19	7	(2)
2014–	Martinique	2	(0)
- * Club domestic league appearances and goals as of 20 July 2019 ‡ National team caps and goals as of 3 December 2015

Harry Christopher Novillo (born 11 February 1992) is a Martiniquais professional footballer who recently played as a striker and winger.

== Club career ==
=== Olympique Lyonnais ===
Born in Lyon, France, Novillo joined Lyon when he was seven years old in 1999, having previously played for another youth academy, Saint-Fons. Novillo was promoted to professional team in July 2010.

He made his professional debut at Lyon on 7 August 2010 in a league match against Monaco, coming on as a substitute for Ederson. Novillo made his second appearance for Lyon on 13 August 2011 in a league match against Ajaccio, coming on as a substitute for Bafétimbi Gomis. Two years later, Novillo made two Europa League appearances against Sparta Prague and Hapoel Ironi Kiryat Shmona.

==== Loan to Le Havre AC ====
On deadline day, Novillo joined Le Havre on loan for the rest of the 2011–12 season. Novillo made his Le Havre debut on 9 September 2011, in a 2–1 win over Tours. Eleven days later on 20 September 2011, Novillo scored his first goal for the club, in a 1–1 draw against Le Mans. Novillo went on to make sixteen appearances for the club, having been absent throughout the season.

==== Loan to Gazélec Ajaccio ====
In January 2013, Novillo joined Gazélec Ajaccio on loan until the end of the season. Novillo's debut was delayed over dislocated shoulder in training that will keep him out from fifteen to twenty days. However, Novillo's debut came on 15 February 2013, which he scored, in a 3–2 loss against Nîmes Olympique. His second goal then came on 29 March 2013, in a 2–1 loss against Chamois Niortais. Novillo went on to make seven appearances and scoring twice for Gazélec Ajaccio. Upon returning to his parent club, Novillo was released by the club on 22 August 2013. Novillo later stated he left because of his strained relationship with then Manager Rémi Garde.

=== Mons ===
After leaving Lyon, Novillo moved abroad to Belgium by joining Mons on a two-year contract, with an options of extending into two years and was given number 10 shirt. Novillo made his Mons debut on 14 September 2013, coming on as a substitute for Mustapha Jarju, in a 1–1 draw against Waasland-Beveren.

However, Novillo only made two appearances and at the end of the season, Novillo was released by the club. Novillo said about his move on Mons, quoting: " I did not play due to certain people who had problems with those who had slightly darker skin than others" and "I think that the Belgian way of life was not for me. Already the Flemish and the Walloons don't like each other so it won't be the French who they particularly like either! That is what counted against me when I went over there. They did not want to play me for reasons that they themselves seemed to ignore."

=== Clermont Foot ===
Novillo returned to France by joining Clermont on a three-year contract.

Novillo made his Clermont Foot debut in the opening game of the season against Brest. On 22 August 2014, Novillo scored his first goal for the club, in a 4–3 loss against his former club, Gazélec Ajaccio. Four days later, Novillo scored in the second round of Coupe De La Ligue, in a 3–1 win over Châteauroux Novillo scored again on 29 September 2014, in a 1–0 win over Tours. Novillo's fourth goal came in the Round of 32 of Coupe De La Ligue, in a 4–3 loss against Caen.

After six months at Clermont Font, Novillo had his contract terminated on 13 January 2015. This came after Novillo was involved in an incident with his teammates.

Shortly leaving Clermont Font, Novillo went on trial at Saint-Étienne, with a view to earning a contract. However, Novillo didn't attend the trial as a request from the club.

=== Melbourne City ===
On 2 March 2015, Novillo signed for Australian side Melbourne City on an injury replacement contract for Damien Duff.

Novillo made his debut against the Central Coast Mariners, coming on as a substitute for David Williams, which Melbourne City lost 1–0. His next game was on 14 March 2015 against Newcastle Jets in which he scored his first goal. A week later on 3 April 2015, Novillo scored his second goal for the club, in a 1–1 draw against Western Sydney Wanderers. Novillo scored the winner against Wellington Phoenix to send City through to their first ever A-league semi-final. As his short-term was about to expire, Novillo's contract with Melbourne City was extended for two years, taking a foreign visa slot.

=== Manisaspor ===
On 22 June 2016, it was announced that Melbourne City FC had agreed to transfer Novillo to Turkish second division club Manisaspor, for an undisclosed fee. Novillo made only six appearances for Manisaspor in an injury-plagued season with the club and left the club in the January 2017 transfer window.

=== Baniyas Club ===
In January 2017, Arabian Gulf League side Baniyas Club announced it had acquired Novillo for the remainder of the 2016/17 season.

=== Johor Darul Ta'zim FC ===
In May 2018, Novillo moved to Malaysian Super League club Johor Darul Ta'zim FC, the reigning league champions. He made an immediate impression at the club, scoring in his debut match against Selangor FA.

But in the end of May, Novillo was dropped from JDT squad due poor performances after three matches, announced by Tunku Ismail Idris himself. He said, "Even after signing players for millions, if I see that those players aren't performing after a few games, they can leave and I will look for their replacements for JDT. That's never happened in Malaysian football, but this is JDT." He also said, that Novillo had done well by scoring on his debut against Selangor (on 12 May), but failed to replicate that form against Negeri Sembilan FA and PKNS FC.

=== Montreal Impact ===
On 5 December 2018, Novillo signed with the Montreal Impact that is managed by his former coach Rémi Garde. On 22 July 2019, Montreal and Novillo agreed to terminate his contract with the club.

== International career ==
Born in Lyon, France, Novillo is a France youth international, having earned caps at under-17 level. He has also represented the Martinique national football team.

== Honours ==
Personal

- PFA A-League Team of the Season: 2015-16
