= A-League Youth Golden Boot =

- Awarded for: The leading goalscorer in a given Y-League season.
- Sponsored by: Nike
- Country: Australia
- Presented by: Football Federation Australia
- First award: 2009
- Final award: 2019
- Currently held by: Moudi Najjar

Highlights
- Most awards: Francesco Monterosso (2)

The A-League Youth Golden Boot, formerly Y-League Golden Boot, is an annual soccer award presented to the leading goalscorer in the Y-League, currently referred to as the Nike Golden Boot for sponsorship purposes.

The Y-League was founded in 2008. The number of teams in the league has ranged from seven to ten during its history, and there are currently ten clubs in the league. The award is given to the top-scorer over the regular season (not including the finals series/grand final).

Francesco Monterosso is the only player to have won the award on multiple occasions.

== Winners ==
Key
Player (X)	Name of the player and number of times they had won the award at that point (if more than one)
Games	The number of Y-League regular season games played by the winner that season
Rate	The winner's goals-to-games ratio that regular season
§	Denotes the club were Y-League premiers in the same season

Y-League Golden Boot winners
Season	Player	Nationality	Club	Goals	Games	Rate	Ref(s)
2008–09	Francesco Monterosso	Australia	Adelaide United Youth	13	18	0.72	
2009–10	Francesco Monterosso (2)	Australia	Adelaide United Youth	17			
2010–11	Bernie Ibini-Isei	Australia	Central Coast Mariners Academy	12			
2011–12	Mitchell Mallia	Australia	Sydney FC Youth	13			
2012–13	Kale Bradbery	Australia	Newcastle Jets Youth	13			
2013–14	Anthony Costa	Australia	Adelaide United Youth	14			
2014–15	Wade Dekker	Australia	Melbourne City Youth^{§}	9			
2015–16	Joey Katebian	Australia	Melbourne Victory Youth	10			
2016–17	Pierce Waring	Australia	Melbourne Victory Youth	6			
2017–18	Abraham Majok	South Sudan	Western Sydney Wanderers Youth^{§}	9	7	0.78	
2018–19	Moudi Najjar	Syria	Melbourne City Youth	7	6	0.86	

== Awards won by club ==
Club	Total
Adelaide United Youth	3
Melbourne Victory Youth	2
Melbourne City Youth	2
Central Coast Mariners Academy	1
Sydney FC Youth	1
Newcastle Jets Youth	1
Western Sydney Wanderers Youth	1

== See also ==
- Y-League records and statistics
- A-League Golden Boot
- W-League Golden Boot
