= 2010–11 National Youth League (Australia) =

2010–11 A-League National Youth League
- League: A-League National Youth League
- Sport: Association football
- Duration: 2010–2011
- Teams: 9

A-League National Youth League season
- Premiers: Gold Coast United
- Top scorer: Bernie Ibini-Isei (12)

A-League National Youth League seasons
- ← 2009–10 2011–12 →

The A-League National Youth League's 2010–11 season was the third season of the Australian A-League National Youth League football competition. Like the previous season, the current season ran in parallel with the A-League 2010–11 season.

== Standings ==
Pos	Team	Pld	W	D	L	GF	GA	GD	Pts
1	Gold Coast United Youth (C)	20	14	2	4	50	27	+23	44
2	Central Coast Mariners Academy	20	11	2	7	43	28	+15	35
3	Adelaide United Youth	20	10	1	9	36	31	+5	31
4	Sydney FC Youth	20	9	3	8	36	31	+5	30
5	AIS Football Program	20	9	2	9	43	38	+5	29
6	Brisbane Roar Youth	20	8	3	9	36	37	−1	27
7	Newcastle Jets Youth	20	6	3	11	29	40	−11	21
8	Melbourne Victory Youth	19	7	0	12	29	42	−13	21
9	Perth Glory Youth	19	6	2	11	30	49	−19	20

Rules for classification: 1) points; 2) goal difference; 3) number of goals scored.
(C) Champions

== Regular season ==
The 2010–11 A-League National Youth League season was played over 23 rounds- a shorter season than the previous one – and without a subsequent finals series.

Round 1

18 September 2010	Newcastle Jets	4–1	Australian Institute of Sport	Adamstown Oval, Newcastle
	Griffiths 7'; Virgili 42'; Iacovelli 81' (pen.); Pettit 90+1'	Report	Brown 85'	Referee: Stuart Wolfe

18 September 2010	Gold Coast United	2–1	Central Coast Mariners	Owen Park, Southport, Gold Coast
	Wearing 66'; Harold 77'	Report	Ibini-Isei 22'	Referee: Matthew Gillett

19 September 2010	Melbourne Victory	0–5	Perth Glory	Epping Stadium, Melbourne
		Report	Oyet 26'; Jukic 40', 47'; Fondyke 45'; Risdon 70'	Referee: Alex Azzcura

19 September 2010	Brisbane Roar	3–3	Sydney FC	Perry Park, Brisbane
	Meyer 4', 55'; Thurtell 67'	Report	Cirjak 16'; Danning 62', 88'	Referee: Matthew Skinner

Round 2

24 September 2010	Adelaide United	1–2	Perth Glory	Hindmarsh Stadium, Adelaide
	Mullen 40' (pen.)	Report	Edwards 12', 67'	Referee: Regis Queffelec

26 September 2010	Sydney FC	0–4	Gold Coast United	Sydney Football Stadium, Sydney
		Report	Broadfoot 6', 78', 90+3'; Satake 70'	Referee: Andrew Best

26 September 2010	Brisbane Roar	3–2	Australian Institute of Sport	Luxury Paints Stadium, Richlands, Brisbane
	Milovanović 55'; McLean 75'; Meyer 82'	Report	Taggart 36'; Becket 60'	Referee: Adam Kersey

26 September 2010	Newcastle Jets	3–2	Melbourne Victory	Adamstown Oval, Newcastle
	Griffiths 5'; Iacovelli 7'; Forbes 45'	Report	Kellaway 24'; Kalifatidis 40'	Referee: Kevin Peddie

Round 3

2 October 2010	Perth Glory	0–0	Brisbane Roar	6PR Stadium, Inglewood, Perth
		Report		Referee: Josh Mihevc

3 October 2010	Central Coast Mariners	0–2	Australian Institute of Sport	Budgewoi Soccer Club, Budgewoi, Central Coast
		Report	Becket 23', 44'	Referee: Stuart Wolfe

3 October 2010	Gold Coast United	Abandoned	Melbourne Victory	Owen Park, Southport, Gold Coast
		Report		Referee: Adam Kersey

4 October 2010	Sydney FC	0–1	Adelaide United	Seymour Shaw Park, Sydney
		Report	Shin 47'	Referee: Stephen Lucas

Round 4

9 October 2010	Central Coast Mariners	2–0	Melbourne Victory	Budgewoi Soccer Club, Budgewoi, Central Coast
	Lewis 37'; Kwasnik 88'	Report		Referee: Andrew Best

9 October 2010	Newcastle Jets	2–2	Sydney FC	Adamstown Oval, Newcastle
	Iacovelli 35'; Veleski 77' (pen.)	Report	Chianese 18', 65'	Referee: Matthew Cropper

10 October 2010	Australian Institute of Sport	1–1	Adelaide United	AIS Athletics Track, Canberra
	Peterson 38'	Report	Kostopoulos 49'	Referee: Stephen Lucas

Round 5

16 October 2010	Australian Institute of Sport	3–0	Perth Glory	AIS Athletics Track, Canberra
	Barker-Daish 26'; Espindola 48'; Proia 90'	Report	Mitchell (red card) 63'	Referee: Steven Lucas

16 October 2010	Gold Coast United	2–1	Newcastle Jets	Owen Park, Southport, Gold Coast
	Broadfoot 5'; Mebrahtu 67'	Report	Veleski 64'	Referee: Jason Crow

17 October 2010	Melbourne Victory	2–1	Adelaide United	Epping Stadium, Melbourne
	Kalifatidis 79'; Stirton 86'	Report	Costa 47'	Referee: Lucien Laverdure

17 October 2010	Brisbane Roar	1–1	Central Coast Mariners	Spencer Park, Brisbane
	Archibald 77'	Report	Duke 2'	Referee: Matthew Skinner

Round 6

22 October 2010	Adelaide United	3–2	Newcastle Jets	Hindmarsh Stadium, Adelaide
	Kostopoulos 6'; Costa 30'; Monterosso 57'	Report	Virgili 55'; Green 72'	Referee: Christian Verdicchio

23 October 2010	Central Coast Mariners	1–1	Gold Coast United	Budgewoi Soccer Club, Budgewoi, Central Coast
	Ibini-Isei 45'	Report	Ronto 73'	Referee: Stephen Lucas

23 October 2010	Perth Glory	0–2	Sydney FC	6PR Stadium, Inglewood, Perth
		Report	Petratos 16'; Danning 28'	Referee: Matthew Cheeseman

24 October 2010	Brisbane Roar	2–1	Melbourne Victory	Spencer Park, Brisbane
	McLean 42'; Bush 58'	Report	Kalifatidis 71'	Referee: Matthew Gillett

Round 7

30 October 2010	Newcastle Jets	0–0	Perth Glory	Adamstown Oval, Newcastle
		Report		Referee: Tim McGilchrist

31 October 2010	Melbourne Victory	4–1	Gold Coast United	John Cain Memorial Park, Thornbury, Melbourne
	Pilkington 30', 63', 87'; Kalifatidis 51'	Report	Harold 36'	Referee: Kevin Docherty

31 October 2010	Sydney FC	4–1	Brisbane Roar	Campbelltown Stadium, Sydney
	Lum 26' (pen.); Chianese 43'; Powell 46'; Petratos 67'	Report	Meyer 11'	Referee: Kevin Peddie

Round 8

6 November 2010	Perth Glory	2–1	Adelaide United	6PR Stadium, Inglewood, Perth
	Pearson 19'; Edwards 37'	Report	Mullen 71' (pen.)	Referee: Josh Mihevc

7 November 2010	Melbourne Victory	2–1	Central Coast Mariners	John Cain Memorial Park, Thornbury, Melbourne
	Kellaway 39'; Foschini 68'	Report	Fitzgerald 6'	Referee: Alex Azcurra

7 November 2010	Brisbane Roar	1–0	Gold Coast United	Spencer Park, Brisbane
	Dougall 49'	Report		Referee: Andrew Best

Round 9

13 November 2010	Australian Institute of Sport	1–4	Brisbane Roar	AIS Athletics Track, Canberra
	Peterson 50'	Report	Brattan 58', 75', 86'; Thurtell 93'	Referee: Greg Taylor

13 November 2010	Perth Glory	3–4	Melbourne Victory	6PR Stadium, Inglewood, Perth
	Roux 6'; O'Brien 17'; Jelic 44'	Report	Stirton 1'; Lokvancic 22'; Ricciuti 48'; O'Dea 78'	Referee: Matthew Cheeseman

14 November 2010	Gold Coast United	5–0	Adelaide United	Owen Park, Southport, Gold Coast
	Birighitti 21' (o.g.); Harold 39', 90+3'; Lustica 64', 79'	Report		Referee: Jason Crow

14 November 2010	Newcastle Jets	4–2	Central Coast Mariners	Adamstown Oval, Newcastle
	Iacovelli 28'; Fiorentini 48'; Rooney 84'; Pettit 90+2'	Report	Kalouris 79'; Duke 90+3' (pen.)	Referee: Stuart Wolfe

Round 10

20 November 2010	Adelaide United	2–6	Australian Institute of Sport	Hindmarsh Stadium, Adelaide
	Monterosso 35', 40'	Report	Proia 11', 77'; Geria 15'; Espindola 26', 73'; Barker-Daish 63'	Referee: Christian Verdicchio

20 November 2010	Sydney FC	0–1	Perth Glory	WIN Stadium, Wollongong
		Report	Walmsley 40'	Referee: Matthew Cropper

20 November 2010	Central Coast Mariners	1–3	Gold Coast United	Budgewoi Soccer Club, Budgewoi, Central Coast
	Ibini-Isei 52'	Report	Lustica 21'; Wearing 27'; Harold 90+4' (pen.)	Referee: Tim McGilchrist

21 November 2010	Brisbane Roar	3–0	Newcastle Jets	Spencer Park, Brisbane
	Quinn 30'; Meyer 56'; McLean 58'	Report		Referee: Jason Crow

Round 11

27 November 2010	Australian Institute of Sport	2–0	Gold Coast United	AIS Athletics Track, Canberra
	Barker-Daish 23'; Makarounas 28'	Report		Referee: Gary Vandeburgt

27 November 2010	Central Coast Mariners	2–1	Sydney FC	Budgewoi Soccer Club, Budgewoi, Central Coast
	Mallia 74'; Ibini-Isei 81'	Report	Hayward 25'	Referee: Stephen Lucas

27 November 2010	Brisbane Roar	1–2	Adelaide United	Spencer Park, Brisbane
	McCormick 90+1'	Report	Monterosso 10'; Shin 35'	Referee: Matthew Skinner

28 November 2010	Newcastle Jets	2–1	Melbourne Victory	Adamstown Oval, Newcastle
	Talevski 25'; Veleski 80'	Report	Lokvancic 61'	Referee: Tim McGilchrist

Round 12

3 December 2010	Melbourne Victory	1–4	Australian Institute of Sport	AAMI Park, Melbourne
	Kellaway 58'	Report	Proia 26'; Edwards 67', 90'; Barker-Daish 69' (pen.)	Referee: Lucien Laverdure

4 December 2010	Gold Coast United	3–1	Sydney FC	Owen Park, Southport, Gold Coast
	Mebrahtu 48'; Brillante 63'; Halloran 82'	Report	Lum 20'	Referee: Jason Crow

4 December 2010	Perth Glory	2–1	Brisbane Roar	6PR Stadium, Inglewood, Perth
	Amphlett 27'; Skorich 37' (pen.)	Report	Thurtell 46'	Referee: Matthew Cheeseman

5 December 2010	Central Coast Mariners	5–1	Adelaide United	Budgewoi Soccer Club, Budgewoi, Central Coast
	Ibini-Isei 14', 45', 45+1', 51' (pen.); Duke 79'	Report	Kostopoulas 43'; Nicholson (red card) 88'	Referee: Matthew Cropper

Round 13

11 December 2010	Newcastle Jets	3–0	Australian Institute of Sport	Adamstown Oval, Newcastle
	Patafta 42', 87'; Misura 48'	Report		Referee: Steven Lucas

11 December 2010	Sydney FC	2–1	Brisbane Roar	WIN Stadium, Wollongong
	Hayward 23'; Powell 27'	Report	Dougall 83'	Referee: Andrew Best

11 December 2010	Perth Glory	2–4	Central Coast Mariners	6PR Stadium, Inglewood, Perth
	Quinncroft 45'; Mitchinson 51'	Report	Oates 17'; Warren 36'; Ibini-Isei 58'; Duke 76'	Referee: Josh Mihevc

12 December 2010	Melbourne Victory	2–0	Adelaide United	John Cain Memorial Park, Thornbury, Melbourne
	Foschini 18' (pen.), 56' (pen.)	Report	Birighitti (yellow card) 56' (red card)	Referee: Kevin Docherty

Round 14

17 December 2010	Adelaide United	3–1	Sydney FC	Hindmarsh Stadium, Adelaide
	Rayner 42'; Monterosso 73'; Halliday 85'; Mullen (yellow card) 60' (red card)	Report	Gan 4'	Referee: Christian Verdicchio

18 December 2010	Australian Institute of Sport	4–3	Perth Glory	AIS Athletics Track, Canberra
	Proia 41', 45+1'; Peterson 84'; Chapman 90+1'	Report	Chapman 16' (o.g.); Griffiths 52'; Jelic 88'	Referee: Brett Woodford

18 December 2010	Gold Coast United	3–0	Newcastle Jets	Owen Park, Southport, Gold Coast
	Cooper 19'; Halloran 60'; Anderson 80'	Report		Referee: Matthew Skinner

19 December 2010	Melbourne Victory	1–0	Central Coast Mariners	John Cain Memorial Park, Thornbury, Melbourne
	Kalafatidis 11'	Report		Referee: Adam Kersey

22 December 2010	Sydney FC	2–0	Newcastle Jets	Campbelltown Stadium, Sydney
	Hayward 5'; Powell (Second half)	Report

Round 15

1 January 2011	Sydney FC	2–1	Australian Institute of Sport	Campbelltown Stadium, Campbelltown, Sydney
	Chianese 36'; Cirjak 77'	Report	Makarounas 45+2'; Gan (red card) 38'	Referee: Kevin Peddie

2 January 2011	Gold Coast United	6–4	Perth Glory	Owen Park, Southport, Gold Coast
	Halloran 41', 66', 69'; Russell 62'; Lustica 81' (pen.); Harold 85' (pen.)	Report	Jelic 24', 32', 50'; Taggart 37'	Referee: Matthew Skinner

2 January 2011	Adelaide United	1–3	Brisbane Roar	Hindmarsh Stadium, Adelaide
	Norton 85'	Report	Meyer 15'; Bush 25'; Thurtell 90+2'	Referee: Regis Queffelec

4 January 2011	Central Coast Mariners	3–1	Newcastle Jets	Budgewoi Soccer Club, Budgewoi, Central Coast
	Duke 3'; Amini 20'; Ibini-Isei 25'	Report	Iacovelli 85'	Referee: Matthew Cropper

Round 16

7 January 2011	Melbourne Victory	0–3	Sydney FC	John Cain Memorial Park, Thornbury, Melbourne
		Report	Danning 46'; Chianese 54'; Powell 85'	Referee: Lucien Laverdure

8 January 2011	Australian Institute of Sport	0–1	Gold Coast United	AIS Athletics Track, Canberra
		Report	Wearing 74'	Referee: Stephen Lucas

8 January 2011	Brisbane Roar	Abandoned	Perth Glory	Spencer Park, Brisbane
		Report		Referee: Adam Kersey

8 January 2011	Newcastle Jets	2–3	Adelaide United	Adamstown Oval, Newcastle
	Veleski 34'; Pepper 39'	Report	Monterosso 13'; Wooding 57'; Millgate 68' (o.g.)	Referee: Stuart Wolfe

11 January 2011	Central Coast Mariners	3–0	Australian Institute of Sport	Budgewoi Soccer Club, Budgewoi, Central Coast
	Duke 27', 56'; Oates 79'	Report		Referee: Kurt Ams

Round 17

15 January 2011	Sydney FC	3–0	Newcastle Jets	Sydney Football Stadium, Sydney
	Danning 18', 45'; Speer 35'	Report		Referee: Lucien Laverdure

15 January 2011	Adelaide United	1–3	Gold Coast United	Hindmarsh Stadium, Adelaide
	Kostopoulos 49'	Report	Minniecon 72', 88'; Cooper 82'	Referee: Strebre Delovski

16 January 2011	Perth Glory	2–1	Melbourne Victory	6PR Stadium, Inglewood, Perth
	Oyet 3'; Taggart 47'	Report	Lokvancic 57'	Referee: Matthew Cheeseman

Round 18

21 January 2011	Adelaide United	3–2	Central Coast Mariners	Hindmarsh Stadium, Adelaide
	Rayner 27', 68'; Kostopoulous 89'	Report	Oates 31'; Mallia 78'	Referee: Christian Verdicchio

22 January 2011	Perth Glory	2–5	Australian Institute of Sport	6PR Stadium, Inglewood, Perth
	Oyet 49'; Jovic 88'	Report	Perkatis 18'; Peterson 22'; Makarounas 48'; Proia 68'; Brown 87'	Referee: Josh Mihevc

23 January 2011	Melbourne Victory	0–4	Brisbane Roar	John Cain Memorial Park, Thornbury, Melbourne
		Report	Dougall 16'; Thurtell 51'; Bowles 88'; Donachie 90'	Referee: Kevin Cocherty

23 January 2011	Gold Coast United	1–4	Sydney FC	Owen Park, Southport, Gold Coast
	Minniecon 54'	Report	Powell 4'; Gan 7'; Danning 43', 58'	Referee: Matthew Skinner

Round 19

28 January 2011	Newcastle Jets	0–0	Gold Coast United	Adamstown Oval, Newcastle
		Report		Referee: Tim McGilchrist

29 January 2011	Central Coast Mariners	4–0	Perth Glory	Pluim Park, Central Coast
	Duke 5', 40'; Johnston 23' (o.g.); Munro 85'	Report		Referee: Kurt Ams

29 January 2011	Australian Institute of Sport	3–2	Melbourne Victory	AIS Athletics Track, Canberra
	Makarounas 45+1', 53'; Edwards 64'	Report	Lokvancic 13'; O'Dea 19'	Referee: Greg Taylor

29 January 2011	Adelaide United	2–1	Sydney FC	Hindmarsh Stadium, Adelaide
	Mullen 43' (pen.); Kostopoulous 55'	Report	Cirjak 47'	Referee: Christian Verdicchio

1 February 2011 (Note: Rescheduled match.)	Brisbane Roar	2–5	Central Coast Mariners	Spencer Park, Brisbane
	Thurtell 29'; Groenewald 64'	Report	Ibini-Isei 22', 41'; Sainsbury 45+'; Mallia 80', 81'	Referee: Alan Milliner

Round 20

4 February 2011	Brisbane Roar	0–1	Adelaide United	Spencer Park, Brisbane
		Report	Wooding 23'	Referee: Jason Crow

5 February 2011	Australian Institute of Sport	3–2	Newcastle Jets	AIS Athletics Track, Canberra
	Makarounas 17', 22', 52' (pen.)	Report	Wheelhouse 66'; Veleski 72' (pen.)	Referee: Andrew Best

5 February 2011	Sydney FC	1–3	Central Coast Mariners	Marconi Stadium, Sydney
	Gan 86'	Report	Duke 21', 47'; Oates 35'	Referee: Matthew Cropper

5 February 2011	Perth Glory	1–3	Gold Coast United	6PR Stadium, Inglewood, Perth
	Jovic 49'	Report	Ronto 23', 35'; Russell 77'	Referee: Matthew Cheeseman

Round 21

12 February 2011	Australian Institute of Sport	2–2	Sydney FC	AIS Athletics Track, Canberra
	Good 86'; Proia 88'	Report	Lum 33' (pen.); Grant 45+1'	Referee: Kevin Peddie

12 February 2011	Central Coast Mariners	1–0	Brisbane Roar	Pluim Park, Central Coast
	Fitzgerald 35'	Report		Referee: Stephen Lucas

12 February 2011	Adelaide United	2–1	Melbourne Victory	Raiders Football Club, Adelaide
	Kostopoulous 45+1', 66'	Report	Jeggo 14'	Referee: Regis Queffel

12 February 2011	Perth Glory	1–2	Newcastle Jets	6PR Stadium, Inglewood, Perth
	Pearson 47'	Report	Brown 68'; Forbes 90'	Referee: Josh Mihevc

Round 22

18 February 2011	Newcastle Jets	1–2	Brisbane Roar	Adamstown Oval, Newcastle
	Brockie 50'	Report	Thurtell 23'; Quinn 90'	Referee: Kevin Peddie

19 February 2011	Gold Coast United	2–1	Australian Institute of Sport	Owen Park, Southport, Gold Coast
	Barisic 11'; Lustica 38'	Report	Makarounas 90+3'	Referee: Adam Kersey

19 February 2011	Sydney FC	4–1	Melbourne Victory	Marconi Stadium, Sydney
	Chianese 5'; Lum 20' (pen.); Sherlock 77'; Austin 90+2'	Report	Lokvancic 25'	Referee: Andrew Best

19 February 2011	Adelaide United	3–0	Perth Glory	Raiders Football Club, Adelaide
	Monterosso 38'; Kostopoulos 67' (pen.); Harris 76'	Report		Referee: Christian Verdicchio

Round 23

26 February 2011	Melbourne Victory	4–0	Newcastle Jets	Epping Stadium, Melbourne
	Selemidas 45+1'; Kellaway 59', 73'; Nakic 82'	Report		Referee: Alex Azcurra

26 February 2011	Australian Institute of Sport	1–2	Central Coast Mariners	AIS Athletics Track, Canberra
	Degenek 73'	Report	Glanville 52'; Oates 83'	Referee: Kris Griffith Jones

28 February 2011	Gold Coast United	5–2	Brisbane Roar	Owen Park, Southport, Gold Coast
	Lustica 35'; Harold 42', 90'; Halloran 66'; Russell 70'	Report	Groenewald 44'; Visconte 83' (pen.)	Referee: Jason Crow

== Leading scorers ==
Total	Player		Team	Goals per round																						
Total	Player		Team	1	2	3	4	5	6	7	8	9	10	11	12	13	14	15	16	17	18	19	20	21	22	23
12	(Australia)	Bernie Ibini-Isei	Central Coast Mariners	1					1				1	1	4	1		1				2				
11	(Australia)	Mitchell Duke	Central Coast Mariners					1				1			1	1		1	2			2	2			
9	(Australia)	Evan Kostopoulos	Adelaide United				1		1						1					1	1	1		2	1	
9	(Australia)	Jesse Makarounas	Australian Institute of Sport											1				1			1	2	3		1	
8	(Australia)	Kofi Danning	Sydney FC	2					1										1	2	2					
8	(Australia)	Chris Harold	Gold Coast United	1						1		2	1					1								2
8	(Australia)	Anthony Proia	Australian Institute of Sport					1					2		1		2				1			1		
7	(Australia)	Francesco Monterosso	Adelaide United						1				2	1			1		1						1	
7	(Australia)	Matthew Thurtell	Brisbane Roar	1								1			1			1			1	1			1	
6	(Australia)	Joel Chianese	Sydney FC				2			1								1	1						1	
6	(Australia)	Ben Halloran	Gold Coast United												1		1	3								1
6	(Australia)	Steven Lustica	Gold Coast United									2	1					1							1	1
6	(Australia)	James Meyer	Brisbane Roar	2	1					1			1					1								
5	(Australia)	Fabian Iacovelli	Newcastle Jets	1	1		1					1						1								
5	(Serbia)	Branko Jelic	Perth Glory									1					1	3								
5	(Australia)	James Kalifatidis	Melbourne Victory		1			1	1	1							1									
5	(Australia)	Geoff Kellaway	Melbourne Victory		1						1				1											2
5	(Australia)	Damir Lokvancic	Melbourne Victory									1		1						1		1			1	
5	(Australia)	James Oates	Central Coast Mariners													1			1		1		1			1
5	(Australia)	Blake Powell	Sydney FC							1						1	1		1		1					
5	(Australia)	Steven Veleski	Newcastle Jets				1	1						1					1				1			

Goal scored from penalty kick Two goals scored from penalty kick

== See also ==
- 2010–11 Adelaide United FC season
- 2010–11 Brisbane Roar FC season
- 2010–11 Central Coast Mariners FC season
- 2010–11 Gold Coast United FC season
- 2010–11 Melbourne Victory FC season
- 2010–11 Newcastle Jets FC season
- 2010–11 Perth Glory FC season
- 2010–11 Sydney FC season
- FFA Centre of Excellence
