= List of A-League Youth seasons =

The Y-League is a semi-professional association football league in Australia. It is currently consists of ten teams. The league has been contested since 2008. In its most recent form, the league includes a 10-round regular season and an end-of-season grand final playoff tournament involving the highest-placed team, culminating in the Grand Final match. The winner of the Y-League Grand Final is crowned champions, where as the regular season winners is dubbed premiers.

== List of seasons ==
The following is a list of all Y-League seasons. It contains the number of teams, the number of matches played, the champions and the top scorer(s) in regular season matches—winner of the Golden Boot.

Season (Grand Final)	Teams	Matches	Premiers	Champions	Top scorer(s)	
Season (Grand Final)	Teams	Matches	Premiers	Champions	Player	Goals
2008–09 (2009)	7	41	Sydney FC	Sydney FC	Francesco Monterosso	13
2009–10 (2010)	9	111	Central Coast Mariners	Gold Coast United	Francesco Monterosso	17
2010–11	9	98	Gold Coast United	Gold Coast United	Bernie Ibini-Isei	12
2011–12	10	109	Central Coast Mariners	Central Coast Mariners	Mitchell Mallia	11
2012–13	10	90	Melbourne Victory	Melbourne Victory	Kale Bradbery	16
2013–14	10	90	Sydney FC	Sydney FC	Anthony Costa	144
2014–15	10	66	Melbourne City	Melbourne City	Wade Dekker	9
2015–16 (2016)	10	41	(A) Adelaide United (B) Sydney FC	Sydney FC	Joey Katebian	10
2016–17 (2017)	10	41	(A) Melbourne City (B) Sydney FC	Melbourne City	Pierce Waring	6
2017–18 (2018)	10	41	(A) Melbourne City (B) Western Sydney Wanderers	Western Sydney Wanderers	Abraham Majok	9
2018–19 (2019)	10	41	(A) Brisbane Roar (B) Western Sydney Wanderers	Brisbane Roar	Moudi Najjar	7

== Grand Finals ==
The A-League Grand Final is the final match of the A-League season, the culmination of the finals series, determining the Champion of the tournament.

Year	Date	Home	Score	Away	Stadium	Attendance	Ref.
2009	21 February	Adelaide United	0–2	Sydney FC	Hindmarsh Stadium	—	
2010	20 March	Perth Glory	1–2	Gold Coast United	Etihad Stadium	—	
2016	25 January	Adelaide United	2–5	Sydney FC	Central Coast Stadium	—	
2017	28 January	Melbourne City	3–2	Sydney FC	Central Coast Stadium	—	
2018	3 February	Melbourne City	1–3	Western Sydney Wanderers	McDonald Jones Stadium	—	
2019	1 February	Western Sydney Wanderers	1–3	Brisbane Roar	ANZ Stadium	1,061	

== See also ==
- Y-League records and statistics
