= A-League Youth records and statistics =

This is a list of Y-League records and statistics

== Club honours ==
=== Champions ===
This is a list of Y-League champions, that is, all the clubs that have won the grand final of the Y-League or finished top of the table as "champions". The winning team is crowned as the Y-League Champion.

Season	Grand Final Date	Winning Team	Score	Losing Team	Location	GF Attendance
2008–09	21 February 2009	Sydney FC (1)	2–0	Adelaide United	Coopers Stadium, Adelaide	—
2009–10	20 March 2010	Gold Coast United (1)	2–1	Perth Glory	Etihad Stadium, Melbourne	—
2010–11	—	Gold Coast United (2)	By Table	Central Coast Mariners	—	—
2011–12	—	Central Coast Mariners (1)	By Table	Brisbane Roar	—	—
2012–13	—	Melbourne Victory (1)	By Table	Central Coast Mariners	—	—
2013–14	—	Sydney FC (2)	By Table	Newcastle Jets	—	—
2014–15	—	Melbourne City (1)	By Table	Brisbane Roar	—	—
2015–16	28 January 2017	Sydney FC (3)	5–2	Adelaide United	Central Coast Stadium, Gosford	—
2016–17	28 January 2017	Melbourne City (2)	3–2	Sydney FC	Central Coast Stadium, Gosford	—
2017–18	3 February 2018	Western Sydney Wanderers (1)	3–1	Melbourne City	McDonald Jones Stadium, Newcastle	—
2018–19	1 February 2019	Brisbane Roar (1)	3–1	Western Sydney Wanderers	ANZ Stadium, Sydney	1,061
2019–20	31 January 2020	Sydney FC (4)	5–1	Melbourne Victory	Jubilee Stadium, Sydney	1,460

=== Premiers ===
This is list of Y-League premiers, that is, all the teams that have won the minor premiership of the Y-League. The team which finishes first on the table at the completion of the regular season is crowned Y-League Premiers.

Season	Premier	Runner-up
2008–09	Sydney FC (1)	Adelaide United
2009–10	Central Coast Mariners (1)	Perth Glory
2015–16	(A) Adelaide United (1) (B) Sydney FC (2)	(A) Brisbane Roar (B) Newcastle Jets
2016–17	(A) Melbourne City (2) (B) Sydney FC (3)	(A) Brisbane Roar (B) Western Sydney Wanderers
2017–18	(A) Melbourne City (3) (B) Western Sydney Wanderers (1)	(A) Melbourne Victory (B) Sydney FC
2018–19	(A) Brisbane Roar (1) (B) Western Sydney Wanderers (2)	(A) Melbourne City (B) Sydney FC
2019–20	(A) Melbourne Victory (1) (B) Sydney FC (4)	(A) Brisbane Roar (B) Central Coast Mariners

The numbers in brackets indicate the number of premierships won by a team.

=== Summary ===
#	Club	Championship		Premiership	
#	Club	Champions	Runners-up	Premiers	Runners-up
1	Sydney FC Youth	4	1	4	2
2	Brisbane Roar Youth	1	2	1	3
3	Melbourne City Youth	2	1	2	1
4	Central Coast Mariners Academy	1	2	1	1
4	Western Sydney Wanderers Youth	1	1	2	1
6	Adelaide United Youth	—	2	1	1
6	Melbourne Victory Youth	1	1	1	1
8	Gold Coast United Youth	2	—	—	—
8	Perth Glory Youth	–	1	–	1
8	Newcastle Jets Youth	—	1	—	1
11	Canberra United Youth	–	–	–	–
11	FFA Centre of Excellence	–	–	–	–

== Individual honours ==
=== Player of the Year ===
Year	Player	Club	Ref.
2008–09	(Australia) Adam Sarota	Brisbane Roar Youth	
2009–10	(Australia) Panny Nikas	Central Coast Mariners Youth	
2010–11	(Australia) Steven Lustica	Gold Coast United	
2011–12	(Australia) Nicholas Fitzgerald	Brisbane Roar Youth	
2012–13	(Australia) Awer Mabil	Adelaide United Youth	
2014–15	(Australia) George Blackwood (Australia) Liam Youlley	Sydney FC Youth; Western Sydney Wanderers Youth	
2015–16	(Australia) Dylan Smith	Adelaide United Youth	
2016–17	(Australia) Marc Tokich	FFA Centre of Excellence	
2017–18	(Australia) Louis D'Arrigo	Adelaide United Youth	
2018–19	(Australia) Fabian Monge	Western Sydney Wanderers Youth	

=== Golden Boot ===
Year	Winner	Club	Goals	Ref.
2008–09	(Australia) Francesco Monterosso	Adelaide United Youth	13	
2009–10	(Australia) Francesco Monterosso	Adelaide United Youth	17	
2010–11	(Australia) Bernie Ibini-Isei	Central Coast Mariners Youth	12	
2011–12	(Australia) Mitchell Mallia	Sydney FC Youth	13	
2012–13	(Australia) Kale Bradbery	Newcastle Jets Youth	13	
2013–14	(Australia) Anthony Costa	Adelaide United Youth	14	
2014–15	(Australia) Wade Dekker	Melbourne City Youth	9	
2015–16	(Australia) Joey Katebian	Melbourne Victory Youth	10	
2016–17	(Australia) Pierce Waring	Melbourne Victory Youth	6	
2017–18	(Australia) Abraham Majok	Western Sydney Wanderers Youth	9	
2018–19	(Australia) Moudi Najjar	Melbourne City Youth	7	
2019–20	(Australia) Marco Tilio	Sydney FC Youth	9	

== League milestones ==
Milestone	Player	Match	Date	Season
1st Goal	Joshua McVey	Melbourne Victory v Brisbane Roar	26 September 2008	Round 1, 2008–09
100th Goal	Adrian Karakolevski	Queensland Roar v Newcastle Jets	16 December 2008	Round 12, 2008–09
200th Goal	Ibrahim Haydar	Adelaide United v Sydney FC	21 February 2009	Grand Final, 2008–09
300th Goal	Eli Babalj	Gold Coast United v Australian Institute of Sport	1 November 2009	Round 8, 2009–10
400th Goal	Mitchell Mallia	Sydney FC v Central Coast Mariners	3 October 2009	Round 4, 2009–10
500th Goal	Trent Sainsbury	Melbourne Victory v Australian Institute of Sport	6 February 2010	Round 23, 2009–10
600th Goal	James Meyer	Brisbane Roar v Sydney FC	19 September 2010	Round 1, 2010–11
700th Goal	Jake Barker-Daish	Adelaide United v Australian Institute of Sport	20 November 2010	Round 10, 2010–11
800th Goal	Nathan Millgate (O.G.)	Newcastle Jets v Adelaide United	8 January 2011	Round 16, 2010–11
900th Goal	Steven Lustica	Gold Coast United v Brisbane Roar	28 February 2011	Round 22, 2010–11
1000th Goal	Kale Bradbery	Newcastle Jets v Brisbane Roar	20 November 2011	Round 5, 2011–12
1st Red Card	Evan Berger	Melbourne Victory v Central Coast Mariners	17 January 2009	Round 17, 2008–09

== Club records ==
=== Titles ===
- Most Premiership titles: 4, Sydney FC
- Most Championship titles: 4, Sydney FC
- Most consecutive Premiership title wins: 2, Sydney FC (2016, 2017), Melbourne City (2017, 2018), Western Sydney Wanderers (2018, 2019)
- Most consecutive Championship title wins: 2, Gold Coast United (2010, 2011)
