= 2016–17 National Youth League (Australia) =

National Youth League
- Season: 2016–17
- Champions: Melbourne City Youth (2nd title)
- Matches: 40
- Goals: 167 (4.18 per match)
- Best Player: Marc Tokich
- Top goalscorer: Pierce Waring (6 goals)
- Biggest home win: Perth Glory Youth 5–1 Melbourne Victory Youth (11 December 2016)
- Biggest away win: FFA Centre of Excellence 0–8 Western Sydney Wanderers Youth (4 December 2016)
- Highest scoring: FFA Centre of Excellence 0–8 Western Sydney Wanderers Youth (4 December 2016); Western Sydney Wanderers Youth 6–2 FFA Centre of Excellence (15 January 2017); Melbourne City Youth 4–4 Melbourne Victory Youth (22 January 2017)
- Longest winning run: Melbourne City Youth (4 games)
- Longest unbeaten run: Melbourne City Youth (4 games)
- Longest winless run: FFA Centre of Excellence, Melbourne Victory Youth (6 games)
- Longest losing run: FFA Centre of Excellence (6 games)

The 2016–17 National Youth League (also known as the Foxtel National Youth League for sponsorship reasons) was the ninth season of the Australian National Youth League competition.

== Teams ==

Team	Home city	Home ground
Adelaide United Youth	Adelaide	Elite Systems Football Centre
Brisbane Roar Youth	Brisbane	Spencer Park / A.J. Kelly Park
Central Coast Mariners Academy	Gosford	Central Coast Mariners Centre of Excellence
FFA Centre of Excellence	Canberra	Australian Institute of Sport
Melbourne City Youth	Melbourne	CB Smith Reserve
Melbourne Victory Youth	Melbourne	Lakeside Stadium
Newcastle Jets Youth	Newcastle	Magic Park
Perth Glory Youth	Perth	Ashfield Arena
Sydney FC Youth	Sydney	Lambert Park
Western Sydney Wanderers Youth	Sydney	Marconi Stadium / Popondetta Park

== Format ==
The 2016–17 season used the same format as the previous season, with the existing ten NYL teams divided into two conferences of five teams: Conference A consisted of teams from WA, SA, Victoria and Queensland, while teams from ACT and NSW were in Conference B. Teams in each conference played each other on a home and away basis, followed by a Grand Final between the top team from each conference.

== Standings ==
Conference A
Pos	Team	Pld	W	D	L	GF	GA	GD	Pts	Qualification
1	Melbourne City Youth (C)	8	5	1	2	18	12	+6	16	Qualification to the Grand Final
2	Brisbane Roar Youth	8	4	2	2	21	14	+7	14	
3	Perth Glory Youth	8	4	0	4	12	12	0	12	
4	Adelaide United Youth	8	3	1	4	14	17	−3	10	
5	Melbourne Victory Youth	8	1	2	5	13	23	−10	5	

Source: Foxtel National Youth League
(C) Champions

Conference B
Pos	Team	Pld	W	D	L	GF	GA	GD	Pts	Qualification
1	Sydney FC Youth	8	5	1	2	23	15	+8	16	Qualification to the Grand Final
2	Western Sydney Wanderers Youth	8	4	1	3	26	15	+11	13	
3	Central Coast Mariners Academy	8	3	3	2	15	13	+2	12	
4	Newcastle Jets Youth	8	3	1	4	14	15	−1	10	
5	FFA Centre of Excellence	8	2	0	6	11	31	−20	6	

Source: Foxtel National Youth League

== Table of results ==
Conference A
Home \ Away	ADE	BRI	MCY	MVC	PER
Adelaide United Youth		2–2	2–1	0–3	3–1
Brisbane Roar Youth	3–2		1–4	3–3	0–2
Melbourne City Youth	4–1	0–4		4–4	1–0
Melbourne Victory Youth	1–4	1–2	0–3		0–2
Perth Glory Youth	2–0	0–6	0–1	5–1	

Legend: Blue = home team win; Yellow = draw; Red = away team win.

Conference B
Home \ Away	CCM	FFA	NEW	SYD	WSW
Central Coast Mariners Academy		4–2	2–2	0–3	3–1
FFA Centre of Excellence	2–1		2–1	2–5	0–8
Newcastle Jets Youth	0–2	2–0		0–2	4–3
Sydney FC Youth	2–2	4–1	4–3		3–4
Western Sydney Wanderers Youth	1–1	6–2	0–2	3–0	

Legend: Blue = home team win; Yellow = draw; Red = away team win.

=== Positions by round ===
Conference A
Team ╲ Round	1	2	3	4	5	6	7	8	9	10
Melbourne City Youth	1	1	1	1	1	2	2	2	1	1
Brisbane Roar Youth	2	2	2	3	2	1	1	1	2	2
Perth Glory Youth	4	5	5	5	4	4	4	4	4	3
Adelaide United Youth	5	4	3	2	3	3	3	3	3	4
Melbourne Victory Youth	2	3	4	4	5	5	5	5	5	5

Conference B
Team ╲ Round	1	2	3	4	5	6	7	8	9	10
Sydney FC Youth	3	1	3	2	2	3	4	3	2	1
Western Sydney Wanderers Youth	4	4	1	1	1	2	1	2	1	2
Central Coast Mariners Academy	5	5	5	5	4	4	3	1	3	3
Newcastle Jets Youth	1	2	2	3	3	1	2	4	4	4
FFA Centre of Excellence	2	3	4	4	5	5	5	5	5	5

== Group stage ==
=== Conference A ===
Round 1

12 November 2016	Melbourne City Youth	4–1	Adelaide United Youth	Melbourne
17:00 AEDT	Genreau 14'; Ahmed 25', 37'; Chapman 75'	Report	Mori 66' (pen.)	Stadium: CB Smith Reserve

13 November 2016	Brisbane Roar Youth	3–3	Melbourne Victory Youth	Brisbane
8:30 AEST	Brady 52'; D'Agostino 66'; D. Ingham 75'	Report	Waring 3'; Derrick 8'; Stanisavljevic 44'	Stadium: Spencer Park

Round 2

19 November 2016	Melbourne Victory Youth	0–3	Melbourne City Youth	Melbourne
16:00 AEDT		Report	Sylaidos 12'; Genreau 58'; Colazo 61'	Stadium: Lakeside Stadium

20 November 2016	Perth Glory Youth	0–6	Brisbane Roar Youth	Perth
10:30 AWST		Report	Rodic 16'; Katebian 34', 61'; Brady 40'; Panetta 67'; Champness 75'	Stadium: Ashfield Arena

Round 3

26 November 2016	Melbourne City Youth	1–0	Perth Glory Youth	Melbourne
10:30 AEDT	Arzani 31'	Report		Stadium: CB Smith Reserve

26 November 2016	Melbourne Victory Youth	1–4	Adelaide United Youth	Melbourne
14:50 AEDT	Waring 54'	Report	Marino 18' (pen.), 36', 47'; Mori 57'	Stadium: AAMI Park

Round 4

3 December 2016	Adelaide United Youth	3–1	Perth Glory Youth	Adelaide
10:30 ACDT	Mori 10'; Strain 13' (pen.), 40' (pen.)	Report	Stynes 80'	Stadium: Elite Systems Football Centre

22 December 2016	Brisbane Roar Youth	1–4	Melbourne City Youth	Brisbane
19:00 AEST	Katebian 85'	Report	Sylaidos 23'; Arzani 40', 48'; Portelli 90+4'	Stadium: A.J. Kelly Park; Referee: Daniel Olson

Round 5

10 December 2016	Brisbane Roar Youth	3–2	Adelaide United Youth	Brisbane
10:30 AEST	D'Agostino 15' (pen.), 23'; Katebian 45+2'	Report	Warland 52', 83'	Stadium: A.J. Kelly Park; Referee: Ryan Mooney

11 December 2016	Perth Glory Youth	5–1	Melbourne Victory Youth	Perth
10:30 AWST	A. Williams 18'; Knowles 33', 82'; Stynes 45'; Albano 46'	Report	Waring 72'	Stadium: Ashfield Arena; Referee: Tom Dowle

Round 6

17 December 2016	Adelaide United Youth	2–1	Melbourne City Youth	Adelaide
16:30 ACDT	Marino 26', 80'	Report	Genreau 68'	Stadium: Elite Systems Football Centre; Referee: Samuel Kuys

18 December 2016	Melbourne Victory Youth	1–2	Brisbane Roar Youth	Melbourne
15:30 AEDT	Hope 23'	Report	D'Agostino 13'; O'Toole 87'	Stadium: Lakeside Stadium

Round 7

2 January 2017	Melbourne City Youth	0–4	Brisbane Roar Youth	Melbourne
16:30 AEDT		Report	Driver 18', 90'; Katebian 74', 85'	Stadium: CB Smith Reserve; Referee: Andrew Meimarakis

4 January 2017	Melbourne Victory Youth	0–2	Perth Glory Youth	Melbourne
10:30 AEDT		Report	K. Petratos 14' (pen.); Knowles 80'	Stadium: Epping Stadium

Round 8

8 January 2017	Adelaide United Youth	0–3	Melbourne Victory Youth	Adelaide
10:30 ACDT		Report	Howard 25' (pen.); McGilp 29'; Waring 71'	Stadium: Elite Systems Football Centre

8 January 2017	Brisbane Roar Youth	0–2	Perth Glory Youth	Brisbane
10:30 AEST		Report	K. Petratos 4'; Knowles 32'	Stadium: A.J. Kelly Park; Referee: Daniel Olson

Round 9

14 January 2017	Adelaide United Youth	2–2	Brisbane Roar Youth	Adelaide
16:30 AEDT	Rowles 10' (o.g.); Marino 21'	Report	Prasad 62'; Rowles 90'	Stadium: Elite Systems Football Centre

15 January 2017	Perth Glory Youth	0–1	Melbourne City Youth	Perth
10:30 AWST		Report	Sylaidos 54'	Stadium: Ashfield Arena; Referee: Tom Dowle

Round 10

22 January 2017	Perth Glory Youth	2–0	Adelaide United Youth	Perth
08:00 AWST	Albano 55'; Stynes 66'	Report		Stadium: Ashfield Arena

22 January 2017	Melbourne City Youth	4–4	Melbourne Victory Youth	Melbourne
19:50 AEDT	Ahmed 75', 82', 90+4' (pen.); Crowley 84'	Report	Derrick 8'; Waring 42' (pen.), 89' (pen.); Quinn 54'	Stadium: CB Smith Reserve

=== Conference B ===
Round 1

13 November 2016	FFA Centre of Excellence	2–1	Central Coast Mariners Academy	Canberra
10:30 AEDT	Selden 21'; Roberts 62'	Report	Wales 6'	Stadium: AIS Grass Fields

13 November 2016	Newcastle Jets Youth	4–3	Western Sydney Wanderers Youth	Newcastle
16:00 AEDT	Ma 6'; Brymora 16'; Cooper 26' (pen.); Brennan 80'	Report	Shabow 54' (pen.), 56'; Majok 73'	Stadium: Jack McLaughlan Oval

Round 2

20 November 2016	Sydney FC Youth	4–1	FFA Centre of Excellence	Sydney
17:00 AEDT	Blackwood 48' (pen.); Antoniou 57'; Mutch 70'; Zapta 79'	Report	Muratovic 21'	Stadium: Lambert Park

20 November 2016	Western Sydney Wanderers Youth	1–1	Central Coast Mariners Academy	Sydney
18:00 AEDT	Shabow 73'		Stewart	Stadium: Marconi Stadium

Round 3

26 November 2016	Central Coast Mariners Academy	2–2	Newcastle Jets Youth	Gosford
10:30 AEDT	Poscoliero 15'; Safdari 82'	Report	Pavicevic 14'; Haliti 29'	Stadium: CCM Centre of Excellence

26 November 2016	Western Sydney Wanderers Youth	3–0	Sydney FC Youth	Sydney
18:00 AEDT	Majok 10', 35'; Scott 59'	Report		Stadium: Marconi Stadium

Round 4

3 December 2016	Newcastle Jets Youth	0–2	Sydney FC Youth	Newcastle
16:00 AEDT		Report	Zapata 57'; Antoniou 90'	Stadium: Magic Park

4 December 2016	FFA Centre of Excellence	0–8	Western Sydney Wanderers Youth	Canberra
16:00 AEDT		Report	Lustica 7', 45', 56'; Davies 22'; Shabow 26', 68'; Najjarine 82'; E. Martinez 87'	Stadium: AIS Grass Fields

Round 5

10 December 2016	Newcastle Jets Youth	2–0	FFA Centre of Excellence	Newcastle
10:30 AEDT	Burke 4'; Joice 7'	Report		Stadium: Magic Park

11 December 2016	Sydney FC Youth	2–2	Central Coast Mariners Academy	Sydney
17:30 AEDT	E. Gonzalez 44'; C. Gonzalez 90+2'	Report	Bingham 51' (pen.); Wales 55'	Stadium: Lambert Park; Referee: Adam Powers

Round 6

17 December 2016	Central Coast Mariners Academy	4–2	FFA Centre of Excellence	Gosford
10:30 AEDT	Wales 28'; Stewart 49', 59', 78'	Report	Roberts 64', 86'	Stadium: CCM Centre of Excellence

18 December 2016	Western Sydney Wanderers Youth	0–2	Newcastle Jets Youth	Sydney
19:30 AEDT		Report	Jennings 50'; Brymora 66'	Stadium: Popondetta Park

Round 7

30 December 2016	Newcastle Jets Youth	0–2	Central Coast Mariners Academy	Newcastle
18:30 AEDT		Report	Pratt 18'; Lee 90+1'	Stadium: Magic Park

2 January 2017	Sydney FC Youth	3–4	Western Sydney Wanderers Youth	Sydney
19:00 AEDT	Blackwood 8'; Lokolingoy 19', 42'	Report	Davies 15'; Shabow 26' (pen.), 31' (pen.); Maia 58'	Stadium: Lambert Park

Round 8

7 January 2017	Central Coast Mariners Academy	3–1	Western Sydney Wanderers Youth	Gosford
16:00 AEDT	Bingham 30', 54' (pen.); Safdari 53'	Report	Najjarine 16'	Stadium: CCM Centre of Excellence

7 January 2017	FFA Centre of Excellence	2–5	Sydney FC Youth	Canberra
16:00 AEDT	Roberts 22'; Italiano 58'	Report	Lokolingoy 5', 60'; Mutch 51'; Kuleski 82'; Antoniou 89'	Stadium: AIS Grass Fields

Round 9

15 January 2017	Western Sydney Wanderers Youth	6–2	FFA Centre of Excellence	Sydney
16:00 AEDT	Lustica 38'; Najjarine 50'; 57'; Majok 60'; Shabow 76'; Cimenti 85'	Report	19'; 73'	Stadium: Popondetta Park

15 January 2017	Sydney FC Youth	4–3	Newcastle Jets Youth	Sydney
17:00 AEDT	Lokolingoy 43'; Mutch 65'; Arditti 77'; Antoniou 90+2'	Report	Sawyer 30', 53', 67' (pen.)	Stadium: Lambert Park

Round 10

21 January 2017	FFA Centre of Excellence	2–1	Newcastle Jets Youth	Canberra
10:30 AEDT	Tokich 22', 59'	Report	Brymora 34'	Stadium: AIS Grass Fields; Referee: Adam Powers

21 January 2017	Central Coast Mariners Academy	0–3	Sydney FC Youth	Gosford
16:00 AEDT		Report	Faty 6' (o.g.); Arditti 80'; Mutch 90+1'	Stadium: CCM Centre of Excellence

== Grand Final ==
28 January 2017
14:00 AEDT

Melbourne City Youth	3–2	Sydney FC Youth
Crowley 22', 90+11' (pen.); Arzani 81' (pen.)	Report	Timotheou 58'; Lokolingoy 68'

Central Coast Stadium, Gosford
Attendance: 7,205 (Note: Attendance for A-League match between Central Coast Mariners and Perth Glory succeeding the match.)
Referee: Stephen Laurie
