= 2011–12 National Youth League (Australia) =

2011–12 A-League National Youth League
- League: A-League National Youth League
- Sport: Association football
- Duration: 2011–2012
- Teams: 10

A-League National Youth League season
- Champions: Central Coast Mariners
- Top scorer: Mitchell Mallia

A-League National Youth League seasons
- ← 2010–11 2012–13 →

The 2011–12 A-League National Youth League was the fourth season of the Australian A-League National Youth League competition. The season ran alongside the 2011-12 A-League season and the winner was the Central Coast Mariners, who won the championship for the first time. The league expanded from 9 teams the previous year to 10 teams with the Melbourne Heart participating in the competition for the first time.

== Teams ==
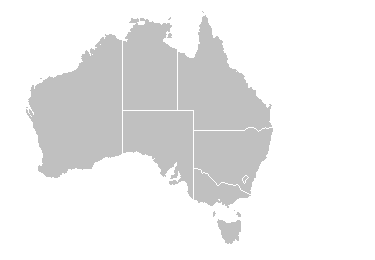

Team	Manager	Kit manufacturer	Major Sponsor
Adelaide United	(Australia) Michael Valkanis	Erreà	
Australian Institute of Sport	(Netherlands) Jan Versleijen	Reebok	
Brisbane Roar FC	(Scotland) John Sime	Puma	
Central Coast Mariners	(Australia) Tony Walmsley	Hummel	
Gold Coast United	(England) Mike Mulvey	Fi-ta	
Melbourne Heart	(Australia) John Aloisi	ISC	ParkTrent
Melbourne Victory	(Wales) Darren Davies	Adidas	
Newcastle Jets	(Australia) Craig Deans	ISC	
Perth Glory FC	(Australia) Gareth Naven	X-blades	
Sydney FC	(England) Ian Crook	Adidas	

== Standings ==
Pos	Team	Pld	W	D	L	GF	GA	GD	Pts
1	Central Coast Mariners Academy (C)	18	11	3	4	41	16	+25	36
2	Brisbane Roar Youth	18	9	5	4	50	33	+17	32
3	Perth Glory Youth	18	9	5	4	36	31	+5	32
4	Gold Coast United Youth	18	7	5	6	33	30	+3	26
5	Melbourne Heart Youth	18	8	2	8	35	37	−2	26
6	Sydney FC Youth	18	7	4	7	40	31	+9	25
7	Adelaide United Youth	18	6	5	7	30	34	−4	23
8	Newcastle Jets Youth	18	5	5	8	27	29	−2	20
9	AIS Football Program	18	5	1	12	28	59	−31	16
10	Melbourne Victory Youth	18	4	3	11	15	34	−19	15

Rules for classification: 1) points; 2) goal difference; 3) number of goals scored.
(C) Champions

== Regular season ==
Round 1

21 October 2011	Central Coast Mariners	1–1	Newcastle Jets	Pluim Park, Central Coast
	Appiah-Kubi 59'	Report	Payne 18'

22 October 2011	Perth Glory	3–0	Australian Institute of Sport	Macedonia Park
	Makarounas 45+2'; Taggart 48'; Sterjovski 70' (pen.)	Report

22 October 2011	Sydney FC	1–1	Adelaide United	Leichhardt Oval, Sydney
	Mallia 50'	Report	Wooding 72'

22 October 2011	Brisbane Roar	2–0	Gold Coast United	Cleveland Showgrounds, Cleveland
	Borello 65'; Dougall 70' (pen.)	Report

23 October 2011	Melbourne Heart	2–0	Melbourne Victory	John Cain Memorial Park, Thornbury
	Andrijasevic 33'; Z. Walker 71'	Report

Round 2

29 October 2011	Sydney FC	5–1	Melbourne Heart	Leichhardt Oval, Sydney
	Lum 13' (pen.); Mallia 32', 65', 87'; Rufer 81'	Report	Kalmar 27'

29 October 2011	Gold Coast United	2–3	Newcastle Jets	Owen Park, Southport
	Anderson 16'; Bragg 31'	Report	Ewart 4'; Payne 36' (yellow card) ?' (yellow-red card) ?'; Talevski 46'; Simic (yellow card) ?' (yellow-red card) 58'

29 October 2011	Brisbane Roar	1–3	Adelaide United	Cleveland Showgrounds, Cleveland
	Thurtell 37'	Report	Kamara 20'; Da Silva 80'; Monaco 86'

30 October 2011	Central Coast Mariners	2–3	Perth Glory	Pluim Park, Central Coast
	McDonald 28'; Duke 54'	Report	O'Neill 60'; Amphlett 68'; McGarry 71'

Round 3

2 November 2011	Newcastle Jets	1–1	Perth Glory	Adamstown Oval, Newcastle
	Vrankovic 89'	Report	Vittiglia 31'

5 November 2011	Australian Institute of Sport	2–0	Gold Coast United	AIS Athletics Track, Canberra
	Warland 50'; Williams 71'	Report

5 November 2011	Adelaide United	0–1	Melbourne Heart	Burton Park
		Report	Babalj 35'

5 November 2011	Sydney FC	0–1	Central Coast Mariners	Leichhardt Oval, Sydney
		Report	Appiah-Kubi 54'

6 November 2011	Melbourne Victory	1–5	Brisbane Roar	Kingston Heath, Cheltenham
	Jeggo 9'	Report	Nakic 26' (o.g.); Jackson 28'; Cirjak 33'; Bush 47'; Lambadaridis 84'; Brattan (red card) ?'

Round 4

11 November 2011	Central Coast Mariners	6–0	Melbourne Victory	Pluim Park, Central Coast
	McDonald 15'; Hayward 24' (pen.), 30' (pen.), 41'; Pellegrino 27'; Appiah-Kubi 85'	Report

12 November 2011	Brisbane Roar	3–2	Australian Institute of Sport	Cleveland Showgrounds, Cleveland
	Lambadaridis 10'; Fitzgerald 17', 30'; Mundy (red card) 45'	Report	Prior 12', 45' (pen.); Woodcock (yellow card) ?' (yellow-red card) 89'

13 November 2011	Perth Glory	2–5	Sydney FC	6PR Stadium, Inglewood
	Canglia 76'; Hudson 90'	Report	Mallia 29', 42', 85'; Chianese 39'; Petratos 51'

13 November 2011	Melbourne Heart	3–1	Newcastle Jets	John Cain Memorial Park, Thornbury
	Worm 2'; Groenewald 64'; Z. Walker 74'	Report	Haliti 23'; Simic (yellow card) ?' (yellow-red card) ?'

13 November 2011	Gold Coast United	4–1	Adelaide United	Owen Park, Southport
	Severino 4'; Bevan 14'; Barker-Daish 57'; Yeboah 89'	Report	Wooding 84'

Round 5

19 November 2011	Gold Coast United	3–2	Melbourne Heart	Owen Park, Southport
	Lucas 12'; Bowles 51'; Barker-Daish 63'	Report	Goodwin 71', 75'

19 November 2011	Adelaide United	2–3	Perth Glory	Burton Park
	Wooding 62', 90+2'	Report	Makeche 14'; Vittiglia 26'; Jovic 75'

20 November 2011	Central Coast Mariners	3–1	Australian Institute of Sport	Pluim Park, Central Coast
	Littler 21'; Duke 32'; Oates 63'	Report	Karatzas 90+2'

20 November 2011	Sydney FC	5–1	Melbourne Victory	Leichhardt Oval, Sydney
	Makela 14', 28'; Chianese 16'; Mallia 33'; Tomislav Mijic 50'	Report	Srahah 59'

20 November 2011	Newcastle Jets	3–6	Brisbane Roar	Adamstown Oval, Newcastle
	Virgili 3'; Bradbery 30', 63'	Report	Dougall 2'; Fitzgerald 10', 52', 80'; Visconte 36'; Cirjak 84'

Round 6

26 November 2011	Australian Institute of Sport	4–3	Sydney FC	AIS Athletics Track, Canberra
	Mauk 14'; Proia 23'; Barac 33'; Garuccio 88'	Report	Lum 41'; Mallia 65'; Powell 90'

26 November 2011	Adelaide United	0–5	Newcastle Jets	Burton Park
		Report	Payne 29', 35', 90'; Talevski 42'; Abbas 77'

27 November 2011	Melbourne Victory	1–2	Gold Coast United	AAMI Park
	O'Dea 24'	Report	Severino 80'; Bowles 90'

27 November 2011	Melbourne Heart	2–1	Central Coast Mariners	John Cain Memorial Park, Thornbury
	Andrijasevic 53'; Z. Walker 86'	Report	Hayward 73' (pen.)

27 November 2011	Brisbane Roar	2–2	Perth Glory	Cleveland Showgrounds, Cleveland
	Thurtell 42'; Fitzgerald 58'	Report	Vittiglia 33'; Makarounas 65'

Round 7

3 December 2011	Australian Institute of Sport	0–2	Melbourne Heart	AIS Athletics Track, Canberra
		Report	Oxborrow 13' (o.g.); Williams 23'

3 December 2011	Sydney FC	4–4	Brisbane Roar	Leichhardt Oval, Sydney
	Powell 15'; Mallia 50', 71'; Lum 66' (pen.)	Report	Visconte 22', 56' (pen.); Fitzgerald 57'; Cirjak 88'

3 December 2011	Adelaide United	0–2	Central Coast Mariners	Burton Park
		Report	Sainsbury 65'; Hayward 75'

4 December 2011	Perth Glory	1–0	Gold Coast United	6PR Stadium, Inglewood
	Makeche 78'	Report

4 December 2011	Newcastle Jets	2–1	Melbourne Victory	Adamstown Oval, Newcastle
	Payne 47', 52'	Report	Jeggo 56'

Round 8

10 December 2011	Gold Coast United	3–1	Sydney FC	Owen Park, Southport
	Mebrahtu 17'; Yeboah 25'; Lucas 90+3'	Report	Chianese 20'

10 December 2011	Australian Institute of Sport	0–4	Newcastle Jets	AIS Athletics Track, Canberra
		Report	Payne 1' (pen.), 34'; Pettit 50'; Ewart 69'

11 December 2011	Perth Glory	2–1	Central Coast Mariners	6PR Stadium, Inglewood
	Makeche 14', 87'; Mitchinson (red card) 65'	Report	Duke 11'

11 December 2011	Melbourne Victory	1–2	Adelaide United	Kingston Heath, Cheltenham
	Chaabani 76'	Report	Watson 58'; Kirk 66'; Golec (red card) 62'

11 December 2011	Brisbane Roar	2–5	Melbourne Heart	Cleveland Showgrounds, Cleveland
	Groenwald 4' (o.g.); Thurtell 8'	Report	Williams 70', 88'; Z. Walker 75', 76', 85'

Round 9

16 December 2011	Newcastle Jets	0–1	Sydney FC	Adamstown Oval, Newcastle
		Report	Figon 84'

17 December 2011	Melbourne Victory	0–2	Australian Institute of Sport	Kingston Heath, Cheltenham
		Report	Green 13'; Garuccio 34'

17 December 2011	Brisbane Roar	1–0	Central Coast Mariners	Suncorp Stadium
	Fitzgerald 60'	Report

17 December 2011	Adelaide United	2–2	Gold Coast United	Burton Park
	Kamara (?)	Report	Cooper (?); Mebrahtu (?)

17 December 2011	Perth Glory	3–0	Melbourne Heart	6PR Stadium, Inglewood
	Taggart 28'; Arnez (?); Makarounas 90+2'	Report	Treloar (red card) 86'

21 December 2011	Australian Institute of Sport	3–2	Melbourne Victory	AIS Athletics Track, Canberra
	Melling (?); Appiah (?); Field (?)	Report	Jeggo (?) ? (?)

Round 10

6 January 2012	Central Coast Mariners	2–1	Gold Coast United	Pluim Park, Central Coast
	Pellegrino 4'; McDonald 59'	Report	Barker-Daish 30'

7 January 2012	Australian Institute of Sport	4–4	Perth Glory	AIS Athletics Track, Canberra
	Perkatis 3'; Proia 17', 65'; Garuccio 48'	Report	O'Neill 22'; Amphlett 28'; Makeche 20', 47'

7 January 2012	Melbourne Heart	1–3	Sydney FC	John Cain Memorial Park, Thornbury
	Petreski 67'	Report	Powell 49', 90'; Chianese 73'

8 January 2012	Melbourne Victory	2–0	Newcastle Jets	Kingston Heath, Cheltenham
	O'Dea 37'; Srahah 78'	Report

8 January 2012	Adelaide United	1–1	Brisbane Roar	Burton Park
	Kostopoulos 16'	Report	Quinn 90'

10 January 2012	Central Coast Mariners	3–1	Melbourne Heart	Pluim Park, Central Coast
	Treloar 7' (o.g.); Duke 57', 73'	Report	Z. Walker 3'

Round 11

13 January 2012	Newcastle Jets	1–4	Central Coast Mariners	Adamstown Oval, Newcastle
	Hoole 5'	Report	Rogic 28', 45', 74' (pen.); Appiah-Kubi 64'

14 January 2012	Gold Coast United	5–3	Australian Institute of Sport	Owen Park, Southport
	Lucas 22'; Barker-Daish 23', 28'; Cooper 76', 90+1'	Report	Proia 5'; Garuccio 27'; Barresi 66'

14 January 2012	Adelaide United	1–0	Melbourne Victory	Burton Park
	Kamara 69'	Report

15 January 2012	Brisbane Roar	0–3	Sydney FC	Cleveland Showgrounds, Cleveland
		Report	Mallia 29'; Chianese 46'; Powell 89'

16 January 2012	Melbourne Heart	3–4	Perth Glory	John Cain Memorial Park, Thornbury
	Bosnjak 11', 26' (pen.); Walker 29'	Report	Treloar 13' (o.g.); Clisby 62'; Makeche 84'; Arnez 87'

Round 12

20 January 2012	Newcastle Jets	1–0	Australian Institute of Sport	Ausgrid Stadium
	Talevski 82'	Report

20 January 2012	Central Coast Mariners	3–0	Adelaide United	Pluim Park, Central Coast
	Gallagher 32'; Appiah-Kubi 42'; Caceres 53'	Report	Wooding (red card)

21 January 2012	Sydney FC	1–3	Gold Coast United	WIN Jubilee, Kogarah
	Sherlock 66'	Report	Cooper 15', 77'; Minniecon 52'

21 January 2012	Perth Glory	0–0	Melbourne Victory	6PR Stadium, Inglewood
		Report

22 January 2012	Melbourne Heart	1–5	Brisbane Roar	John Cain Memorial Park, Thornbury
	Goodwin 63'	Report	Fitzgerald 7'; Thurtell 49', 75'; Lambadaridis 73'; Cirjak 90'

Round 13

28 January 2012	Australian Institute of Sport	0–4	Central Coast Mariners	AIS Athletics Track, Canberra
		Report	Hayward 50'; Duke 60'; Farina 72'; Littler 82'

28 January 2012	Melbourne Heart	2–2	Gold Coast United	John Cain Memorial Park, Thornbury
	Goodwin 6'; Zahra 27'	Report	Severino 21'; Lucas (red card); Russell 77'

28 January 2012	Perth Glory	2–2	Adelaide United	6PR Stadium, Inglewood
	O'Brien 14'; Makarounas 37'	Report	Elsey 36'; Kostopoulos 55'

29 January 2012	Melbourne Victory	2–1	Sydney FC	Kingston Heath, Cheltenham
	Srahah 26'; O'Dea 33'	Report	Mallia 10'

29 January 2012	Brisbane Roar	1–1	Newcastle Jets	Cleveland Showgrounds, Cleveland
	Cirjak 27'	Report	Virgili 16'

Round 14

3 February 2012	Central Coast Mariners	2–0	Brisbane Roar	Pluim Park, Central Coast
	Duke 34', 90'	Report

4 February 2012	Adelaide United	5–1	Australian Institute of Sport	Burton Park
	Kostopoulos 2', 58'; Da Silva 8'; Mabil 47'; N. Mavromatis 83'	Report	Mauk 68'

4 February 2012	Gold Coast United	3–1	Perth Glory	Owen Park, Southport
	Cooper 18'; Tesfagabr 41'; Russell 90+1'	Report	O'Brien 82'

4 February 2012	Sydney FC	1–1	Newcastle Jets	WIN Jubilee, Kogarah
	Mallia 87'	Report	Jesic 6'

5 February 2012	Melbourne Victory	2–1	Melbourne Heart	Kingston Heath, Cheltenham
	Srahah 16'; Cristaldo 70'	Report	Zahra 23'

Round 15

10 February 2012	Newcastle Jets	Abandoned	Gold Coast United	Adamstown Oval, Newcastle
		Report

11 February 2012	Melbourne Victory	0–0	Central Coast Mariners	Kingston Heath, Cheltenham
		Report

11 February 2012	Australian Institute of Sport	2–11	Brisbane Roar	AIS Athletics Track, Canberra
	Karatzas 29'; Mauk 73'	Report	Proia 14', 33', 42'; Nakajima Farran 16', 49', 54'; Danning 24' (pen.); Thurtell 51', 80', 92'; Geria 85'

11 February 2012	Sydney FC	1–2	Perth Glory	Sydney Football Stadium
	Madonis 69'	Report	O'Brien 43', 90'

12 February 2012	Melbourne Heart	1–1	Adelaide United	John Cain Memorial Park, Thornbury
	Walker 24'	Report	Kamara 50'

Round 16

18 February 2012	Melbourne Heart	4–0	Australian Institute of Sport	John Cain Memorial Park, Thornbury
	Walker 40', 57', 84'; Peluso 91'	Report

18 February 2012	Adelaide United	3–4	Sydney FC	Burton Park
	Mavromatis 40'; Elsey 53'; Wooding 58'	Report	Powell 20', 48'; Figon 31'; Gibbs 82'

19 February 2012	Brisbane Roar	2–1	Melbourne Victory	Cleveland Showgrounds, Cleveland
	Lambadaridis 17'; Cirjak 66' (pen.)	Report	Srahah 48'

19 February 2012	Gold Coast United	3–6	Central Coast Mariners	Owen Park, Southport
	Rigters 32', 52'; Yeboah 79'	Report	Stanojevic 9'; Jurman 26'; Musialik 70'; Duke 72'; Appiah-Kubi 82', 86'

19 February 2012	Perth Glory	1–0	Newcastle Jets	6PR Stadium, Inglewood
	Amphlett 88'	Report

Round 17

25 February 2012	Newcastle Jets	1–2	Adelaide United	Adamstown Oval, Newcastle
	Haliti 87'	Report	Kirk 10', 80'; Melling (red card) 25'

26 February 2012	Perth Glory	2–4	Brisbane Roar	6PR Stadium, Inglewood
	Amphlett 50'; Makeche 88'	Report	Donachie 53'; Thurtell 73', 78'; Lambadaridis 85'

26 February 2012	Gold Coast United	Abandoned	Melbourne Victory	Owen Park, Southport
		Report

26 February 2012	Sydney FC	1–2	Australian Institute of Sport	WIN Jubilee, Kogarah
	Figon 65'	Report	Appiah 13'; Barresi 83'

Round 18

2 March 2012	Gold Coast United	Abandoned	Brisbane Roar	Owen Park, Southport

3 March 2012	Australian Institute of Sport	1 – 4 Abandoned after 60 minutes.	Adelaide United	AIS Athletics Track, Canberra
	Taurasi 32'	Report	Welsh 8', 18'; Mabil 12'; Kirk 15'

4 March 2012	Melbourne Victory	1–0	Perth Glory	Kingston Heath, Cheltenham
	Srahah 37'	Report

4 March 2012	Newcastle Jets	2–3	Melbourne Heart	Adamstown Oval, Newcastle
	Bradbery 28'; Virgili 90+1'	Report	Kalmar 32'; Williams 50'; Walker 75' (pen.)

4 March 2012	Central Coast Mariners	Abandoned	Sydney FC	Pluim Park, Central Coast

=== Leading scorers ===
Updated to end of round 10

Total	Player		Club	Goals per Week																	
Total	Player		Club	1	2	3	4	5	6	7	8	9	10	11	12	13	14	15	16	17	18
11	(Australia)	Mitchell Mallia	Sydney FC	1	3		3	1	1	2											
9	(Australia)	Chris Payne	Newcastle Jets	1	1				3	2	2										
8	(Australia)	Nicholas Fitzgerald	Brisbane Roar				2	3	1	1		1									
7	(Australia)	Zac Walker	Melbourne Heart	1			1		1		3			1							
6	(Australia)	Ndumba Makeche	Perth Glory					1		1	2		2								
6	(Australia)	Geoffrey Srahah	Melbourne Victory				1	1		1		1	1	1							
5	(Australia)	Justin Hayward	Central Coast Mariners				3		1	1											
5	(Australia)	Anthony Prior	Australian Institute of Sport			2		1					2								
5	(Australia)	Mitchell Duke	Central Coast Mariners		1			1			1			2							
4	(Australia)	Liam Wooding	Adelaide United	1			1	2													
4	(Australia)	Joel Chianese	Sydney FC				1	1			1		1								
4	(Australia)	Blake Powell	Sydney FC						1	1			2								
3	(Australia)	Kwabena Appiah	Central Coast Mariners	1		1	1														
3	(Australia)	Reece Vittiglia	Perth Glory			1		1	1												
3	(Australia)	Rocky Visconte	Brisbane Roar					1		2											
3	(Australia)	Jared Lum	Sydney FC		1				1	1											
3	(Australia)	Tomislav Cirjak	Brisbane Roar			1		1		1											
3	(Australia)	Matthew Thurtell	Brisbane Roar		1				1		1										
3	(Australia)	David Williams	Melbourne Heart							1	2										
3	(Australia)	Teeboy Kamara	Adelaide United		1							2									
3	(Australia)	Jesse Makarounas	Perth Glory	1					1			1									
3	(Australia)	James Jeggo	Melbourne Victory		1				1			1									
3	(Australia)	Jake Barker-Daish	Gold Coast United				1	1					1								
3	(Australia)	Brad McDonald	Central Coast Mariners		1		1						1								
3	(Australia)	Ben Garuccio	Australian Institute of Sport					1			1		1								
3	(Australia)	Luke O'Dea	Melbourne Victory				1	1					1								
2	(Australia)	George Lambadaridis	Brisbane Roar			1	1														
2	(Australia)	Craig Goodwin	Melbourne Heart					2													
2	(Finland)	Juho Makela	Sydney FC					2													
2	(Australia)	Kenneth Dougall	Brisbane Roar	1				1													
2	(Australia)	Kale Bradbery	Newcastle Jets					2													
2	(Australia)	David Talevski	Newcastle Jets		1				1												
2	(Australia)	Daniel Severino	Gold Coast United				1		1												
2	(Australia)	Daniel Bowles	Gold Coast United					1	1												
2	(Australia)	Stipo Andrijesevic	Melbourne Heart	1					1												
2	(Australia)	Kwame Yeboah	Gold Coast United				1				1										
2	(Australia)	Chris Lucas	Gold Coast United					1			1										
2	(Australia)	Kyle Ewart	Newcastle Jets		1						1										
2	(Australia)	Gol-Gol Mebrahtu	Gold Coast United								1	1									
2	(Australia)	Adam Taggart	Perth Glory	1								1									
2	(Australia)	Adriano Pellegrino	Central Coast Mariners				1						1								
2	(Australia)	Brandon O'Neill	Perth Glory		1								1								
2	(Australia)	Tommy Amphlett	Perth Glory		1								1								
1	(Australia)	Mile Sterjovski	Perth Glory	1																	
1	(Australia)	Brandon Borello	Brisbane Roar	1																	
1	(Australia)	Nick Kalmar	Melbourne Heart		1																
1	(New Zealand)	Caleb Rufer	Sydney FC		1																
1	(Australia)	Zachary Anderson	Gold Coast United		1																
1	(Australia)	Daniel Bragg	Gold Coast United		1																
1	(Australia)	Ricardo Da Silva	Adelaide United		1																
1	(Australia)	Jake Monaco	Adelaide United		1																
1	(Scotland)	Steven McGarry	Perth Glory		1																
1	(Australia)	David Vrankovic	Newcastle Jets			1															
1	(Australia)	Ben Warland	Australian Institute of Sport		1																
1	(Australia)	Jakob Williams	Australian Institute of Sport		1																
1	(Australia)	Eli Babalj	Melbourne Heart			1															
1	(Australia)	Lachlan Jackson	Brisbane Roar			1															
1	(Australia)	Chris Bush	Brisbane Roar			1															
1	(Australia)	Dimitri Petratos	Sydney FC				1														
1	(Australia)	Alex Canglia	Perth Glory				1														
1	(Australia)	Byron Hudson	Perth Glory				1														
1	(Netherlands)	Rutger Worm	Melbourne Heart				1														
1	(Australia)	Labinot Haliti	Newcastle Jets				1														
1	(Australia)	Josh Groenewald	Melbourne Heart				1														
1	(Australia)	Mitch Bevan	Gold Coast United				1														
1	(Australia)	Alec Jovic	Perth Glory					1													
1	(Australia)	Nicholas Littler	Central Coast Mariners					1													
1	(Australia)	James Oates	Central Coast Mariners					1													
1	(Australia)	John Karatzas	Australian Institute of Sport				1														
1	(Australia)	Tomislav Mijic	Sydney FC					1													
1	(Australia)	James Virgili	Newcastle Jets					1													
1	(Australia)	Stefan Mauk	Australian Institute of Sport					1													
1	(Australia)	Daniel Barac	Australian Institute of Sport					1													
1	(Iraq)	Ali Abbas	Newcastle Jets						1												
1	(Australia)	Trent Sainsbury	Central Coast Mariners							1											
1	(Australia)	Scott Pettit	Newcastle Jets								1										
1	(Australia)	Cameron Watson	Adelaide United								1										
1	(Australia)	Dion Kirk	Adelaide United								1										
1	(Australia)	Daniel Chaabani	Melbourne Victory							1											
1	(Australia)	Jordan Figon	Sydney FC									1									
1	(Australia)	Jack Green	Australian Institute of Sport								1										
1	(Australia)	Mitch Cooper	Gold Coast United									1									
1	(Australia)	Clayton Arnez	Perth Glory									1									
1	(Australia)	Jacob Melling	Australian Institute of Sport									1									
1	(Australia)	Bright Appiah	Australian Institute of Sport									1									
1	(Australia)	James Field	Australian Institute of Sport									1									
1	(Australia)	Yianni Perkatis	Australian Institute of Sport										1								
1	(Australia)	Phil Petreski	Melbourne Heart										1								
1	(Costa Rica)	Jean Carlos Solórzano	Melbourne Victory										1								
1	(Australia)	Evan Kostopoulos	Adelaide United										1								
1	(Australia)	Alistair Quinn	Brisbane Roar										1								

Goal scored from penalty kick Two goals scored from penalty kick
