= Ben Wearing =

Australian soccer player

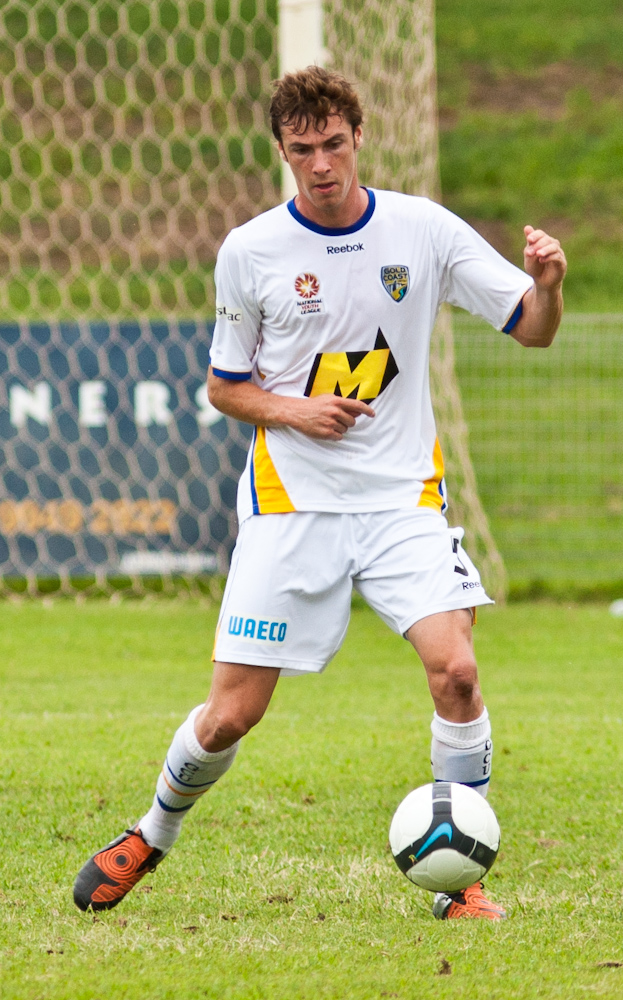
- Wearing playing for Gold Coast United Youth in 2010

Personal information
- Full name: Benjamin Wearing
- Date of birth: 8 May 1989 (age 37)
- Place of birth: Maitland, Australia
- Height: 1.90 m (6 ft 3 in)
- Position: Centre back

Youth career
- Tamborine Mountain
- Magic United
- Coomera
- Musgrave
- 2009–2011: Gold Coast United

Senior career*
Years	Team	Apps	(Gls)
2009–2010	Gold Coast United	1	(0)
2011	→ Heidelberg United (loan)	11	(1)
- * Club domestic league appearances and goals as of 09:57, 13 September 2009 (UTC) ‡ National team caps and goals as of 03:27, 20 September 2009 (UTC)

Ben Wearing (born 8 May 1989) is a former Australian footballer.

== Club career ==
On 28 November 2009, Ben made his senior debut for Gold Coast United starting in a four nill loss to Melbourne Victory.

Wearing was sent out on loan to VPL club Heidelberg United during the A-League and Youth League off seasons.

== Honours ==
With Gold Coast United:

- National Youth League Championship: 2009–2010, 2010–2011
