= 2010–11 Melbourne Victory FC season =

Melbourne Victory
2010–11 season
- Manager: Ernie Merrick; Mehmet Durakovic (caretaker)
- A-League: 5th
- Finals: Qualified
- AFC Champions League: Qualified
- Top goalscorer: Robbie Kruse - 11
- Highest home attendance: 32,231 v Melbourne Heart (22 Jan 2011)
- Lowest home attendance: 10,287 v Gold Coast United (30 Jan 2011)
Home colours	Away colours

The 2010–11 season was Melbourne Victory's sixth season in the Hyundai A-League. It was the first A-League season with two teams from the same city, after the introduction of Melbourne Heart.

== Season summary ==
The 2010–11 season was Melbourne Victory's sixth in the A-League. It was the first A-League season with a second club from Victoria (Melbourne Heart). This hoped to create a Melbourne derby more fierce than those with Sydney FC and Adelaide United. The rivalry reached a new level when Victory skipper Kevin Muscat was red carded for an unacceptable tackle on young Heart player Adrian Zahra. Victory moved their home games to AAMI Park for regular season matches. Melbourne Victory started their pre-season by signing former Socceroos keeper Michael Petkovic from Sivasspor, promoted Diogo Ferreira, Petar Franjic and Sebastian Mattei from the youth team and with Archie Thompson sidelined with a long term injury, Ricardinho was officially unveiled as Melbourne Victory's international marquee player from Oeste Futebol Clube, where he signed a two-year deal and was handed the number 9 shirt. Victory also loaned Geoff Kellaway from Victorian Premier League Premier Dandenong Thunder. On 24 December 2010, Daniel Allsopp rejoined Victory after a year with Al-Rayyan Sports Club and D.C. United.

Meanwhile, promising goalkeeper Mitch Langerak was transferred to Borussia Dortmund after his impressive 2010 AFC Champions League performance. goalkeeper Glen Moss was also transferred to Gold Coast United and attacking midfielder Nick Ward to Wellington Phoenix. Nathan Elasi was released to Bonnyrigg White Eagles and Mathew Theodore was released to Dandenong Thunder.

2010–11 saw Melbourne Victory finish in fifth place in the regular season and qualify for the finals to face fourth placed Gold Coast United in the first week knockout stage. On 20 February 2011, Gold Coast United's Dino Djulbic 90+1 header bundled Melbourne Victory out of the championship race with a stunning 1–0 win in sweltering conditions at Skilled Park.

Melbourne Victory were drawn into Group E in the 2011 AFC Champions League along with Jeju United, Gamba Osaka and sister city team Tianjin Teda. Isaka Cernak had been signed from North Queensland Fury for the 2011 AFC Champions League and the following season.

Towards the end of the 2010–11 A-League season was preceded by major changes at the club, not only in the playing group but also on the board. Inaugural chairman Geoff Lord stepped down and was replaced by Anthony Di Pietro. This led to a changing of the coaching staff. On 12 March 2011, Ernie Merrick came to an agreement with the board of directors to part company with the club after being publicly criticised by fans and media for the club's poor 2010–11 season performance, especially the 4–1 loss to arch rival Adelaide United, and the 5–1 loss to Gamba Osaka in its opening 2011 AFC Champions League game. Youth team head coach and former Socceroo Mehmet Durakovic was then appointed as caretaker manager for the remaining 2011 AFC Champions League competition. Merrick's sacking was followed by that of former Socceroos striker Gary Cole on 12 April 2011 as Football Operation Manager after six years of service. Assistant coach Aaron Healey joined the casualty list of the post-Merrick era the following week, as the club sought to reinvent itself as the pre-eminent football force in Australia. Captain Kevin Muscat announced his retirement after the 2011 AFC Champions League.

Many changes were made to the playing group in the off-season. The club announced on 8 February 2011 that they had signed Perth Glory goalkeeper Tando Velaphi on a two-year deal. On 28 February 2011, it was announced that Mate Dugandžić strengthened the rivalry between the two Melbourne clubs by signing for cross town rival Melbourne Heart and became the first player transferred directly from Victory to Heart. Aziz Behich and Kristian Sarkies were the first two players to play for both teams but not transferred directly as Aziz Behich played for Hume City FC after Victory and before Heart during the A-League off-season while Kristian Sarkies transferred via Adelaide United. The club ended weeks of speculation on 11 March 2011 by officially confirming that they had signed attacking midfielder Marco Rojas for the upcoming season, securing him on a two-year deal. Ricardinho was not selected as one of the five foreign imports for Melbourne's 2011 AFC Champions League campaign, and as a result was loaned to Campeonato Brasileiro Série B club Paraná Clube until 31 December 2011. On 26 March 2011, Socceroos striker Robbie Kruse announced he had signed with 2. Bundesliga side Fortuna Düsseldorf on a three-year contract beginning with the 2011–12 season. The club announced the signing of Jean Carlos Solorzano from Brisbane Roar on 28 March 2011, with L.D. Alajuelense extending his loan deal for one more season so that the move could take place.

== Players ==
=== First team squad ===
Note: Flags indicate national team as defined under FIFA eligibility rules; some limited exceptions apply. Players may hold more than one non-FIFA nationality.

No.	Pos.	Nation	Player
1	GK	AUS	Michael Petkovic
2	DF	AUS	Kevin Muscat (Captain)
3	MF	AUS	Mate Dugandžić (Youth)
4	DF	AUS	Petar Franjic (Youth)
5	DF	THA	Surat Sukha
6	MF	AUS	Leigh Broxham
7	DF	AUS	Matthew Kemp
8	MF	SCO	Grant Brebner
9	FW	BRA	Ricardinho (Marquee)
10	FW	AUS	Archie Thompson (Australian Marquee)
11	MF	CRC	Marvin Angulo (on loan from CS Herediano)
12	DF	AUS	Rodrigo Vargas

No.	Pos.	Nation	Player
13	MF	AUS	Diogo Ferreira (Youth)
14	MF	AUS	Billy Celeski
15	MF	AUS	Tom Pondeljak
16	MF	CRC	Carlos Hernández
17	DF	AUS	Matthew Foschini (Youth)
18	FW	AUS	Danny Allsopp
19	DF	AUS	Evan Berger
20	GK	AUS	Sebastian Mattei (Youth)
21	FW	AUS	Robbie Kruse
23	DF	AUS	Adrian Leijer (Vice Captain)
27	MF	WAL	Geoff Kellaway

== Transfers ==
=== Winter ===
==== In ====
Player	From	League	Fee	Date
(Australia) Diogo Ferreira	Melbourne Victory – Youth	(Australia) National Youth League	Free	April 2010
(Australia) Petar Franjic	Melbourne Victory – Youth	(Australia) National Youth League	Free	April 2010
(Australia) Michael Petkovic	Sivasspor	(Turkey) Süper Lig	Free	June 2010
(Australia) Sebastian Mattei	Melbourne Victory – Youth	(Australia) National Youth League	Free	July 2010
(Wales) Geoff Kellaway	Dandenong Thunder	(Australia) Victorian Premier League	Loan	August 2010
(Brazil) Ricardinho	Oeste Futebol Clube	(Brazil) Campeonato Brasileiro Série D	Not disclosed	August 2010
(Australia) Danny Allsopp	D.C. United	(United States) Major League Soccer	Free	December 2010

==== Out ====
Player	To	League	Fee	Date
(Australia) Mitchell Langerak	Borussia Dortmund	(Germany) Fußball-Bundesliga	Not disclosed	May 2010
(Australia) Nathan Elasi	Bonnyrigg White Eagles	(Australia) NSW Premier League	Released	May 2010
(Australia) Mathew Theodore	Altona Magic	(Australia) Victorian Premier League	Released	May 2010
(Australia) Nik Mrdja	Central Coast Mariners	(Australia) A-League	End of Loan	May 2010
(New Zealand) Glen Moss	Gold Coast United	(Australia) A-League	Free	July 2010
(Australia) Nick Ward	Wellington Phoenix	(Australia) A-League	Free	August 2010

=== Summer ===
==== In ====
Player	From	League	Fee	Date
(Australia) Tando Velaphi	Perth Glory	(Australia) A-league	Free	March 2011
(Australia) Isaka Cernak	North Queensland Fury	(Australia) A-league	Free	March 2011
(New Zealand) Marco Rojas	Wellington Phoenix	(Australia) A-league	Free	March 2011

==== Out ====
Player	To	League	Fee	Date
(Australia) Mate Dugandzic	Melbourne Heart	(Australia) A-League	Free	March 2011
(Australia) Evan Berger	Perth Glory	(Australia) A-League	Free	March 2011

=== Managerial and captain changes ===
Outgoing manager	Manner of departure	Date of vacancy	Table	Incoming manager	Date of appointment	Time
(Scotland) (Australia) Ernie Merrick	Sacked	12 March 2011	5th (10–11)	Mehmet Durakovic (caretaker)	12 March 2011	GF week

Previous captain	Manner of change hand	Date of change hand	New captain	Date of appointment	Time
(Australia) Kevin Muscat	Resigned as captain	16 February 2011	Adrian Leijer	16 February 2011	Regular season

== Matches ==
=== 2010–11 Pre-season friendlies ===
6 July 2010	Melbourne Victory (Australia)	2–1	(Australia) Bentleigh Greens	Olympic Park, Melbourne
	Pondeljak 21'; O'Dea 75'	Report	85' Crenich	Attendance: 16,019

16 July 2010	Melbourne Victory (Australia)	0–1	(Argentina) Boca Juniors	Etihad Stadium, Melbourne
		Report	42' Canete	Attendance: 13,020

20 July 2010	Melbourne Victory (Australia)	2–1	(Australia) Dandenong Thunder	Olympic Park, Melbourne
	Pondeljak 75'; Celeski 89'	Report	50' Reed

25 July 2010	Melbourne Victory (Australia)	0–0	(Australia) Central Coast Mariners	Aurora Stadium, Launceston
		Report

=== 2010–11 Hyundai A-League fixtures ===
7 August 2010	Sydney FC	3–3	Melbourne Victory	Sydney Football Stadium, Sydney
Saturday 20:00 EST	A. Brosque 36'; McFlynn 53'; Cole 86'	Report; Summary	Broxham 66'; Dugandžić 68'; Celeski 73'	Attendance: 12,106; Referee: (Australia) Matthew Breeze

14 August 2010	Melbourne Victory	0–2	Perth Glory	AAMI Park, Melbourne
Saturday 19:30 EST		Report; Summary	Harnwell 23'; Sterjovski 49'	Attendance: 20,358; Referee: (Australia) Gerard Parsons

22 August 2010	Melbourne Victory	2–2	North Queensland Fury	AAMI Park, Melbourne
Sunday 15:00 EST	K. Muscat 30' (pen.), 75' (pen.)	Report; Summary	Sseppuya 16'; Grossman (red card) 30'; Akoto (red card) 81'; Payne 82' (pen.)	Attendance: 13,318; Referee: (Scotland) Chris Boyle

29 August 2010	Gold Coast United	0–1	Melbourne Victory	Skilled Park, Gold Coast
Sunday 15:00 EST		Report; Summary	Kruse 20'	Attendance: 3,624; Referee: (Australia) Ben Williams

3 September 2010	Central Coast Mariners	2–0	Melbourne Victory	Bluetongue Stadium, Gosford
Friday 20:00 EST	Rostyn Griffiths 21'; McBreen 50'	Report; Summary		Attendance: 6,829; Referee: (Australia) Chris Beath

12 September 2010	Melbourne Victory	3–0	Brisbane Roar	AAMI Park, Melbourne
Sunday 15:00 EST	Pondeljak 51'; Ricardinho 56'; Brebner 71'	Report; Summary		Attendance: 13,792; Referee: (Australia) Ryan Shepheard

15 September 2010	Melbourne Victory	0–0	Wellington Phoenix	AAMI Park, Melbourne
Wednesday 19:30 EST		Report; Summary		Attendance: 11,513; Referee: (Australia) Ben Williams

18 September 2010	North Queensland Fury	0–0	Melbourne Victory	Dairy Farmers Stadium, Townsville
Saturday 17:15 EST		Report; Summary		Attendance: 4,922; Referee: (Australia) Chris Beath

25 September 2010	Newcastle Jets	0–0	Melbourne Victory	EnergyAustralia Stadium, Newcastle
Saturday 19:30 EST		Report; Summary		Attendance: 8,652; Referee: (Australia) Chris Beath

8 October 2010 (Note: Game was moved to stop a clash with the AFL grand final replay Archived 4 November 2010 at the Wayback Machine)	Melbourne Heart	2–1	Melbourne Victory	AAMI Park, Melbourne
Friday 19:30 EDT	Aloisi 11'; Alex 48'; Behich (yellow card) 48' (yellow-red card) 74'	Report; Summary	Kruse 37'	Attendance: 25,897; Referee: (Australia) Ben Williams

16 October 2010	Melbourne Victory	3–0	Sydney FC	Etihad Stadium, Melbourne
Saturday 18:45 EDT	Vargas 20'; Hernández 49'; Kruse 90'	Report; Summary		Attendance: 17,299; Referee: (Australia) Ben Williams

23 October 2010	Brisbane Roar	2–1	Melbourne Victory	Suncorp Stadium, Brisbane
Saturday 20:15 EST	Nichols 26'; Solórzano 77'	Report; Summary	Kruse 48'	Attendance: 9,425; Referee: (Australia) Peter Green

29 October 2010	Melbourne Victory	2–1	Adelaide United	Etihad Stadium, Melbourne
Friday 20:00 EDT	Kruse 22'; Hernández 68'	Report; Summary	Fyfe 2'	Attendance: 16,269; Referee: (Australia) Ben Williams

6 November 2010	Melbourne Victory	0–1	Gold Coast United	Etihad Stadium, Melbourne
Saturday 19:00 EDT		Report; Summary	Vargas 55' (o.g.)	Attendance: 15,534; Referee: (Australia) Peter Green

14 November 2010	Perth Glory	3–1	Melbourne Victory	nib Stadium, Perth
Sunday 16:00 WST	Fowler 13', 64', 71'	Report; Summary	Dugandžić 79'	Attendance: 6,217; Referee: (Australia) Chris Beath

18 November 2010	Melbourne Victory	2–2	Central Coast Mariners	AAMI Park, Melbourne
Thursday 19:30 EDT	Vargas 62'; Hernández 64'	Report; Summary	McBreen 29'; Kwasnik 78'	Attendance: 11,674; Referee: (Australia) Gerard Parsons

27 November 2010	Wellington Phoenix	2–2	Melbourne Victory	Westpac Stadium, Wellington
Saturday 18:00 NZDT	T. Brown 18'; Ifill 84'	Report; Summary	A. Thompson 21'; Kruse 40'	Attendance: 6,475; Referee: (New Zealand) Peter O'Leary

3 December 2010	Melbourne Victory	3–3	Brisbane Roar	AAMI Park, Melbourne
Friday 20:00 EDT	Kruse 63', 77'; A. Thompson 71'	Report; Summary	Kemp 30' (o.g.); Solórzano 45+1'; McKay 90+4'	Attendance: 11,886; Referee: (Australia) Peter Green

11 December 2010	Melbourne Heart	1–3	Melbourne Victory	AAMI Park, Melbourne
Saturday 19:00 EDT	Sibon 17'	Report; Summary	Kruse 12', 28'; Srhoj 54' (o.g.)	Attendance: 23,059; Referee: (Australia) Chris Beath

18 December 2010	Melbourne Victory	2–0	Perth Glory	AAMI Park, Melbourne
Saturday 19:00 EDT	A. Thompson 45+4'; Vargas 64'	Report; Summary		Attendance: 12,124; Referee: (Australia) Matthew Breeze

27 December 2010	Melbourne Victory	2–1	Newcastle Jets	AAMI Park, Melbourne
Monday 18:00 EDT	Hernández 20'; Ricardinho 90'	Report; Summary	Zadkovich 54'	Attendance: 16,378; Referee: (Australia) Matthew Breeze

31 December 2010	Central Coast Mariners	1–2	Melbourne Victory	Bluetongue Stadium, Gosford
Friday 18:00 EDT	Leijer 48' (o.g.); Kwasnik (yellow card) 41' (yellow-red card) 53'	Report; Summary	Ferreira 85'; Brebner 87'	Attendance: 12,409; Referee: (Australia) Ben Williams

5 January 2011	Wellington Phoenix	2–0	Melbourne Victory	Westpac Stadium, Wellington
Wednesday 19:30 NZDT	Macallister 67'; Rojas 72'	Report; Summary		Attendance: 9,496; Referee: (Australia) Chris Beath

9 January 2011	Melbourne Victory	1–4	Adelaide United	AAMI Park, Melbourne
Sunday 15:00 EDT	K. Muscat (yellow card) 57' (yellow-red card) 65'; Dugandžić 90+4'	Report; Summary	Flores 12' van Dijk 57', 78'; Barbiero 74'	Attendance: 18,558; Referee: (Australia) Peter Green

15 January 2011	Sydney FC	1–1	Melbourne Victory	Sydney Football Stadium, Sydney
Saturday 19:30 EDT	Makela 90+1'	Report; Summary	Allsopp 52'	Attendance: 11,387; Referee: (Australia) Matthew Breeze

22 January 2011	Melbourne Victory	2–2	Melbourne Heart	Etihad Stadium, Melbourne
Saturday 19:00 EDT	Allsopp 10'; Hernández 31'; K. Muscat (red card) 79'	Report; Summary	Aloisi 45+2', 51'	Attendance: 32,231; Referee: (Australia) Chris Beath

26 January 2011	North Queensland Fury	0–3	Melbourne Victory	Dairy Farmers Stadium, Townsville
Wednesday 19:00 EST		Report; Summary	Allsopp 27'; Dugandzic 69', 73'	Attendance: 4,093; Referee: (Australia) Jarred Gillett

30 January 2011	Melbourne Victory	2–0	Gold Coast United	AAMI Park, Melbourne
Sunday 17:00 EDT	Allsopp 25', 56'	Report; Summary		Attendance: 10,287; Referee: (Australia) Peter Green

2 February 2011	Melbourne Victory	2–0	Newcastle Jets	Etihad Stadium, Melbourne
Wednesday 19:00 EDT	Pondeljak 57'; Kruse 69'	Report; Summary	Fiorentini (red card) 61'	Attendance: 11,296; Referee: (Australia) Strebre Delovski

11 February 2011	Adelaide United	2–1	Melbourne Victory	Adelaide Oval, Adelaide
Friday 19:30 CDT	Reid 6'; T. Dodd 78'	Report; Summary	A. Thompson 65'	Attendance: 21,083; Referee: (Australia) Ryan Shepheard

=== 2010–11 Finals series ===
20 February 2011 Semi-Final 4 v 5	Gold Coast United	1–0	Melbourne Victory	Skilled Park, Gold Coast
Sunday 16:30 EST	Djulbic 90+1'	Report; Summary		Attendance: 3,281; Referee: (Australia) Strebre Delovski

Pos	Team	Pld	W	D	L	GF	GA	GD	Pts	Qualification
1	Brisbane Roar (C)	30	18	11	1	58	26	+32	65	Qualification for 2012 AFC Champions League group stage and Finals series (Note: First place qualifies for the 2012 AFC Champions League group stage. Winning the 2011 A-League Grand Final automatically earns qualification for the 2012 AFC Champions League group stage, unless first place are champions. Second place qualifies for the 2012 AFC Champions League qualifying play-off, unless they qualify for the 2011 A-League Grand Final alongside first place or become A-League Champions, subsequently third place then qualify for the 2012 AFC Champions League qualifying play-off.)
2	Central Coast Mariners	30	16	9	5	50	31	+19	57	Qualification for 2012 AFC Champions League group stage and Finals series
3	Adelaide United	30	15	5	10	51	36	+15	50	Qualification for 2012 AFC Champions League qualifying play-off and Finals series
4	Gold Coast United	30	12	10	8	40	32	+8	46	Qualification for Finals series
5	Melbourne Victory	30	11	10	9	45	39	+6	43	Qualification for Finals series
6	Wellington Phoenix	30	12	5	13	39	41	−2	41	Qualification for Finals series
7	Newcastle Jets	30	9	8	13	29	33	−4	35	
8	Melbourne Heart	30	8	11	11	32	42	−10	35	
9	Sydney FC	30	8	10	12	35	40	−5	34	
10	Perth Glory	30	5	8	17	27	54	−27	23	
11	North Queensland Fury	30	4	7	19	28	60	−32	19	

Source: ultimatealeague.com
Rules for classification: 1) points; 2) goal difference; 3) number of goals scored.
(C) Champions

== Statistics ==
=== Leading scorers ===
Total	Player		Goals per Match																													
Total	Player		1	2	3	4	5	6	7	8	9	10	11	12	13	14	15	16	17	18	19	20	21	22	23	24	25	26	27	28	29	30
11	(Australia)	Robbie Kruse				1						1	1	1	1				1	2	2										1	
5	(Costa Rica)	Carlos Hernández											1		1			1					1					1				
5	(Australia)	Mate Dugandžić	1														1									1			2			
5	(Australia)	Daniel Allsopp																									1	1	1	2		
4	(Australia)	Archie Thompson																		1	1		1									1
3	(Australia)	Rodrigo Vargas											1					1				1										
2	(Australia)	Kevin Muscat			2																											
2	(Brazil)	Ricardinho						1															1									
2	(Scotland)	Grant Brebner						1																1								
2	(Australia)	Tom Pondeljak						1																							1	
1
1	(Australia)	Leigh Broxham	1																													
1	(Australia)	Billy Celeski	1																													
1	(Australia)	Diogo Ferreira																						1								

=== Discipline ===
Updated as end of the season

Name	Cautions (yellow card)	2nd Caution – Send-Off (yellow card) (yellow card) (red card)	Send-Offs (red card)
(Australia) Rodrigo Vargas	6		
(Australia) Billy Celeski	6		
(Scotland) Grant Brebner	5		
(Australia) Adrian Leijer	6		
(Australia) Leigh Broxham	4		
(Australia) Robbie Kruse	5		
(Australia) Diogo Ferreira	5		
(Australia) Mate Dugandzic	2		
(Australia) Matthew Foschini	1		
(Brazil) Ricardinho	3		
(Thailand) Surat Sukha	1		
(Australia) Kevin Muscat	5	1	1
(Costa Rica) Carlos Hernández	4		
(Costa Rica) Marvin Angulo	3		
(Australia) Michael Petkovic	4		
(Australia) Matthew Kemp	1		
(Australia) Tom Pondeljak	3		
(Australia) Daniel Allsopp	2		
(Australia) Evan Berger	1		

== 2011 AFC Champions League ==
=== Group stage ===
Pos	Team	Pld	W	D	L	GF	GA	GD	Pts	Qualification
1	(Japan) Gamba Osaka	6	3	1	2	13	7	+6	10 (Note: Tiebreakers: Gamba Osaka and Tianjin Teda are ranked by their head-to-head records: Gamba Osaka (3 pts, +1 GD), Tianjin Teda (3 pts, –1 GD).)	Advance to knockout stage
2	(China) Tianjin Teda	6	3	1	2	8	6	+2	10	Advance to knockout stage
3	(South Korea) Jeju United	6	2	1	3	6	10	−4	7	
4	(Australia) Melbourne Victory	6	1	3	2	7	11	−4	6	

Notes:
1 March 2011
19:00 UTC+09:00

Gamba Osaka (Japan)	5–1	(Australia) Melbourne Victory
Takei 4'; Adriano 7' (pen.); Lee Keun-Ho 10'; Futagawa 62'; Kim Seung-Yong 90+1'	Report	Muscat 21' (pen.)

Osaka Expo '70 Stadium, Suita
Attendance: 12,949
Referee: Ali Hamad Madhad Saif Albadwawi (UAE)
15 March 2011

Melbourne Victory (Australia)	1–2	(South Korea) Jeju United
Allsopp 37'	Report; Summary	Park Hyun-Beom 41'; Lee Hyun-Ho 84'

Etihad Stadium, Melbourne
Attendance: 4,825
Referee: Subkhiddin Mohd Salleh (Malaysia)
5 April 2011
19:30 UTC+08:00

Tianjin Teda (China)	1 – 1	(Australia) Melbourne Victory
Zorić 19'	Report	Muscat 52'

TEDA Football Stadium, Tianjin
Attendance: 25,456
Referee: Valentin Kovalenko (Uzbekistan)
20 April 2011
19:30 UTC+10:00

Melbourne Victory (Australia)	2 – 1	(China) Tianjin Teda
Hernández 44'; Muscat 45+1' (pen.)	Report	Chen Tao 37'

Docklands Stadium, Melbourne
Attendance: 5,693
Referee: Alireza Faghani (Iran)
4 May 2011
19:30 UTC+10:00

Melbourne Victory (Australia)	1 – 1	(Japan) Gamba Osaka
Leijer 12'	Report	Nakazawa 43'

Docklands Stadium, Melbourne
Attendance: 7,437
Referee: Abdulrahman Abdou (Qatar)
11 May 2011
19:30 UTC+09:00

Jeju United (South Korea)	1 – 1	(Australia) Melbourne Victory
Kim Eun-Jung 25'	Report	Ferreira 61'

Jeju World Cup Stadium, Jeju
Attendance: 1,519
Referee: Valentin Kovalenko (Uzbekistan)

Round	Date	Home team	Score	Away team	Crowd	Stadium
Group Stage	1 March 2011	Gamba Osaka	5–1	Melbourne Victory	12,949	Osaka Expo '70 Stadium, Suita
Group Stage	15 March 2011	Melbourne Victory	1–2	Jeju United	4,825	Etihad Stadium
Group Stage	5 April 2011	Tianjin Teda	1–1	Melbourne Victory	25,456	TEDA Football Stadium, Tianjin
Group Stage	20 April 2011	Melbourne Victory	2-1	Tianjin Teda	5,693	Etihad Stadium
Group Stage	4 May 2011	Melbourne Victory	1–1	Gamba Osaka	7,437	Etihad Stadium
Group Stage	11 May 2011	Jeju United	1–1	Melbourne Victory	1,519	Jeju World Cup Stadium

Preceded by Central Coast Mariners	A-League Premiers; 2008/09	Succeeded by Sydney FC
Preceded by Newcastle Jets	A-League Champions; 2008/09	Succeeded by Sydney FC
