= Steven Lustica =

Australian soccer player

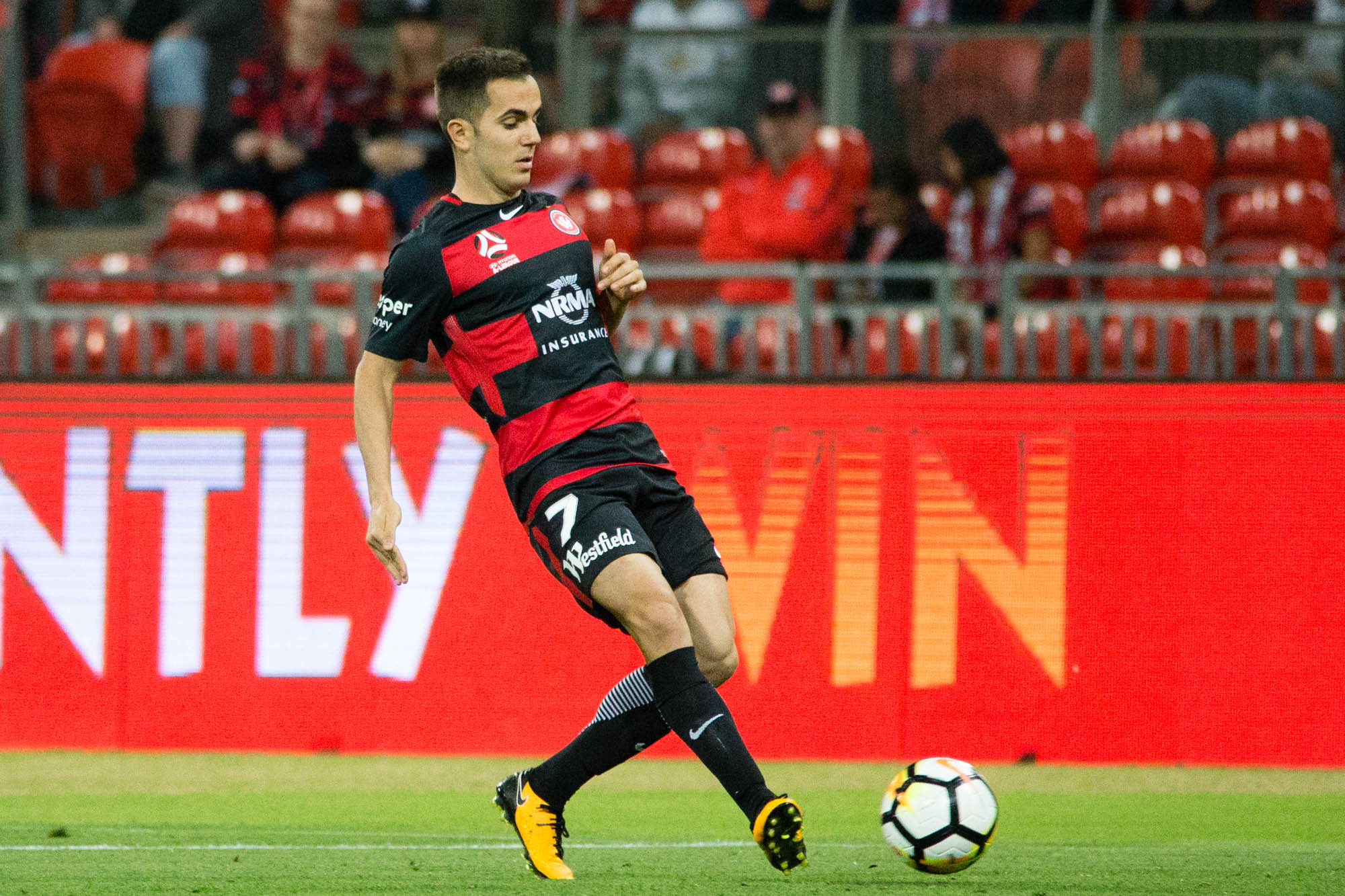
- Steven Lustica playing for Western Sydney Wanderers in 2017

Personal information
- Full name: Steven Lustica
- Date of birth: 12 April 1991 (age 35)
- Place of birth: Canberra, Australia
- Height: 1.75 m (5 ft 9 in)
- Position: Central midfielder

Youth career
- 2003–2005: Canberra FC
- 2005–2008: ACTAS
- 2008–2009: Sydney FC
- 2009–2011: Gold Coast United

Senior career*
Years	Team	Apps	(Gls)
2009–2011	Gold Coast United	4	(0)
2011–2013	Hajduk Split	34	(1)
2012	→ Dugopolje (loan)	10	(1)
2013	→ Brisbane Roar (loan)	12	(2)
2013–2014	Adelaide United	15	(1)
2014–2016	Brisbane Roar	62	(6)
2016–2018	Western Sydney Wanderers	25	(3)
2018–2019	Inter Zaprešić	14	(0)
2019–2020	Qizilqum Zarafshon	13	(1)
2020–2024	Western United	84	(7)

International career
2009–2011	Australia U-20	21	(3)
Medal record
Representing Australia
Men's Association football
AFC U-20 Asian Cup
Runner-up	2010 China
- * Club domestic league appearances and goals as of 10 May 2024

Steven Lustica (Croatian: Luštica; born 12 April 1991) is an Australian soccer player who plays as a central midfielder.

== Club career ==
=== Gold Coast ===
On 24 April 2009, it was confirmed that Lustica had been signed by Gold Coast United, after impressing United's assistant coach, Paul Okon, during his tenure as under-18s coach at the Australian Olympic Youth Festival.

On 19 September 2009, he made his senior debut for Gold Coast, coming off the bench in the 88th minute against Central Coast Mariners.

=== Hajduk Split ===
On 8 June 2011, it was announced that Lustica signed a four-year contract with Croatian giant Hajduk Split. He made his debut against F.C. Barcelona on 23 July 2011. He made his Prva HNL debut on 13 August 2011 against NK Istra in a 3–0 away win with Lustica getting an assist. On 5 June 2011, Lustica scored his first goal for HNK Hajduk Split in a man of the match performance against NK Varazdin also getting an assist in the game.

=== Dugopolje (loan) ===
On 25 January 2012 it was announced that Lustica would join Croatian 2. HNL side NK Dugopolje for the second half of the 2011–12 season. Lustica made 10 appearances for Dugopolje, scoring one goal and assisting the club in achieving promotion to Prva HNL as they beat NK Pomorac Kostrena to the 2. HNL Championship by one point. Lustica returned to Hajduk Split at the conclusion of Dugopolje's season.

=== Brisbane Roar (loan) ===
On 26 January 2013, Brisbane Roar in the Australian A-League signed Lustica on a loan deal which would see him stay at the club until the end of the 2012–13 A-League season. Prior to his signing, Brisbane were having a disappointing season, losing 10 of their opening 17 games of the season and picking up just 17 points. Reunited with former coach Mike Mulvey, Lustica would help turn around Brisbane's season. The club lost only two league games in the remaining 10 games of the regular season, qualifying for the post-season Finals, a feat which looked unlikely after the first two-thirds of the season. Despite the Roar being interested in retaining Lustica, Hajduk Split refused to release him and he returned to Hajduk in June 2013. Luštica scored two goals in his 12 appearances on loan with Brisbane.

=== Adelaide United ===
In September 2013, Hajduk Split changed their mind about releasing him and Lustica was granted a release from his contract which allowed him to return to the A-League with Adelaide United where he agreed a one-year contract for the 2013–14 season. Lustica impressed in his appearances for United, earning himself a place in the Team of the Week in Round 13.

==== Departure from Adelaide United ====
Lustica's time at Adelaide was to be short-lived however, when on 29 January 2014 he requested an early termination to his contract in order to make himself available to former club Brisbane Roar. As Lustica entered the final six months of his contract, he was in negotiations with Adelaide over a one-year extension. According to Adelaide, an agreement was reached in principle but not formalised. Around the same time, Brisbane approached him and an enquiry was made as to whether Adelaide would consider releasing him to join the club immediately, which Adelaide refused. Following this, Adelaide head coach Josep Gombau reported that Lustica had failed to attend training and declared that Lustica was no longer welcome at the club. Lustica was subsequently released from contract with Adelaide United on 2 February 2014.

=== Return to Brisbane Roar ===
On 4 February 2014, it was announced that Lustica had re-signed with former club, Brisbane Roar until the end of the 2015–16 season. Lustica scored his first return goal for Brisbane Roar against the Newcastle Jets in a Round 6 clash which ended in a 4–0 victory for Roar, courtesy of an Henrique hattrick. He scored another goal in the 5–4 battering of Roar against Sydney FC. He rounded off his fairly prolific goalscoring season with a hattrick in a 6–1 win against the Central Coast Mariners at Suncorp Stadium, also providing an assist for Brandon Borrello. The first season of his second spell at the club, Lustica made 25 appearances, scoring five goals and notching two assists.

Lustica opened his goal tally for the 2015–16 season netting a composed finish against the Wellington Phoenix, a 2–1 win to the Roar, as they braved hot conditions in Cairns. Brisbane Roar tabled Lustica a new contract offer in December 2015.

=== Western Sydney Wanderers ===
On 23 May 2016, Lustica signed with the Western Sydney Wanderers on a 2-year contract. The versatile midfielder will forever be etched in Wanderers history for his goal against English Premier League giants Arsenal in July 2017. On 30 June 2018, after making 35 appearances in all competitions, Lustica departed from Western Sydney Wanderers to pursue offers in Europe.

=== Inter Zaprešić ===
In July 2018, shortly after leaving Western Sydney Wanderers, Lustica joined Croatian club Inter Zaprešić. Romanian top-tier team F.C Botosani offered Lustica a contract that he declined.

== Personal life ==
Lustica is of Croat heritage. He is related to former Hajduk Split player Slavko Luštica, who was his grandfather Božidar's cousin.

== Career statistics ==
As of 21 April 2024

Club	Season	League			Cup		Continental		Total	
Club	Season	Division	Apps	Goals	Apps	Goals	Apps	Goals	Apps	Goals
Gold Coast United	2009–10	A-League	2	0	–		–		2	0
Gold Coast United	2010–11	A-League	2	0	–		–		2	0
Gold Coast United	Total		4	0	0	0	0	0	4	0
Hajduk Split	2011–12	Croatian First Football League	18	1	1	0	0	0	11	1
Hajduk Split	2012–13	Croatian First Football League	7	0	2	0	2	0	11	0
Hajduk Split	2013–14	Croatian First Football League	5	0	0	0	0	0	5	0
Hajduk Split	Total		22	1	3	0	2	0	27	1
Dugopolje (loan)	2011–12	Croatian Second Football League	10	1	0	0	–		10	1
Brisbane Roar (loan)	2012–13	A-League	12	2	0	0	1	0	13	2
Adelaide United	2013–14	A-League	15	1	0	0	–		15	1
Brisbane Roar	2013–14	A-League	10	0	0	0	–		10	0
Brisbane Roar	2014–15	A-League	22	5	2	0	1	0	25	5
Brisbane Roar	2015–16	A-League	22	1	0	0	–		22	1
Brisbane Roar	Total		54	6	2	0	1	0	57	6
Western Sydney Wanderers	2016–17	A-League	7	1	3	0	2	1	12	2
Western Sydney Wanderers	2017–18	A-League	16	0	2	1	–		18	1
Western Sydney Wanderers	Total		23	1	5	1	2	1	30	3
Inter Zaprešić	2018–19	Croatian First Football League	14	0	2	0	–		9	0
Qizilqum Zarafshon	2019	Uzbekistan Super League	13	1	1	0	–		14	1
Western United	2019–20	A-League	10	1	0	0	–		10	1
Western United	2020–21	A-League	20	1	–		–		20	1
Western United	2021–22	A-League Men	26	5	2	0	–		28	5
Western United	2022–23	A-League Men	13	0	2	0	–		15	0
Western United	2023–24	A-League Men	15	0	–		–		15	0
Western United	Total		84	7	4	0	0	0	88	7
Career total			225	20	17	1	6	1	248	22

== Honours ==
=== Player ===
Sydney FC Youth

- National Youth League Championship: 2008–09
- National Youth League Premiership: 2008–09

Gold Coast Youth

- National Youth League Championship: 2009–10, 2010–11
- National Youth League Premiership: 2010–11

Dugopolje

- Croatian Second Football League: 2011–12

Brisbane Roar

- A-League Championship: 2013–14
- A-League Premiership: 2013–14

Western United

- A-League Men Championship: 2021–22

Australia U-20

- AFC U-20 Asian Cup: runner-up 2010
- AFF U-19 Youth Championship: 2010

=== Individual ===
- National Youth League Player of the Season: 2010–11
