= Mathew Cheeseman =

Australian soccer referee

- Full name: Mathew Cheeseman
- Born: 2 April 1985 (age 41); Perth, Western Australia
- Other occupation: US Soccer Senior Referee Manager

Domestic
Years	League	Role
2006–2016	Football West State League Premier Division	Referee & Assistant referee
2006–2016	A-League	Assistant referee

International
Years	League	Role
2013–2016	FIFA listed	Assistant referee

Mathew Cheeseman (born 2 April 1985) is a retired Australian soccer referee. He officiated 84 games in the A-League as an Assistant Referee as well officiating 420 games across all disciplines in the Football West State League. He was the Referees Manager for Football Federation Australia.

Cheeseman was appointed as an Assistant Referee for the 2012 A-League Grand Final, becoming only the second Western Australian official to be appointed to a national league grand final.

In 2012 Cheeseman won his third consecutive Golden Whistle as Referee of the Year in the Football West State League. He has also won four State League Assistant Referee of the Year trophies in 2005, 2009, 2010 & 2011.

He was added to the FIFA International Referees List for 2013 as an assistant referee.

An Achilles injury and subsequent surgery saw him retire from active refereeing in August 2016, however he remains involved in the game as a referee assessor and instructor for Football Federation Australia.

Cheeseman currently serves as a senior referee manager for US Soccer.
