= Ryan Pearson (footballer) =

Australian soccer player

Personal information
- Full name: Ryan Pearson
- Date of birth: 31 July 1989 (age 37)
- Place of birth: Perth, Western Australia, Australia
- Height: 1.73 m (5 ft 8 in)
- Position: Right full-back

Team information
- Current team: Balcatta Etna

Senior career*
| Years | Team | Apps | (Gls) |
| 2008 | Armadale SC | | |
| 2009–2012 | Perth Glory | 3 | (0) |
| 2011 | → Sorrento FC (loan) | | |
| 2012–2018 | Sorrento FC | | |
| 2018–2022 | Bayswater City | 53 | (1) |
| 2022– | Balcatta Etna | 22 | (2) |
- * Club domestic league appearances and goals as of 23 November 2023

Ryan Pearson (born 31 July 1989) is an Australian soccer player who plays for Sorrento FC. He joined the club on 1 December 2015. Pearson played the defender right-back position in the field.

== Club career ==
Pearson made his senior debut for Perth Glory on 3 October 2010, coming on as a substitute in the 73rd minute against the Brisbane Roar. Pearson joined the club on 1 December 2015, playing the defender right-back position in the field.
