= Alistair Quinn =

Australian soccer player

Personal information
- Full name: Alistair Quinn
- Date of birth: 1 June 1993 (age 33)
- Place of birth: Brisbane, Australia
- Height: 1.79 m (5 ft 10 1/2 in)
- Position: Full back

Youth career
- 2009–2012: Brisbane Roar
- 2010–2011: QAS
- 2012–2013: Western Sydney Wanderers
- 2014: NAC Breda

Senior career*
Years	Team	Apps	(Gls)
2013	Brisbane Strikers	17	(0)
2014	Richmond SC	2	(1)
2014–2015	Telstar	6	(0)
2015	Olympic FC	8	(2)

International career^{‡}
2011	Australia U-20	1	(0)
- * Club domestic league appearances and goals as of 19 September 2015 ‡ National team caps and goals as of 19 November 2014

Alistair Quinn (born 1 June 1993) is an Australian footballer who plays as a left or right full back for Olympic FC.
