= Geoff Kellaway =

English footballer

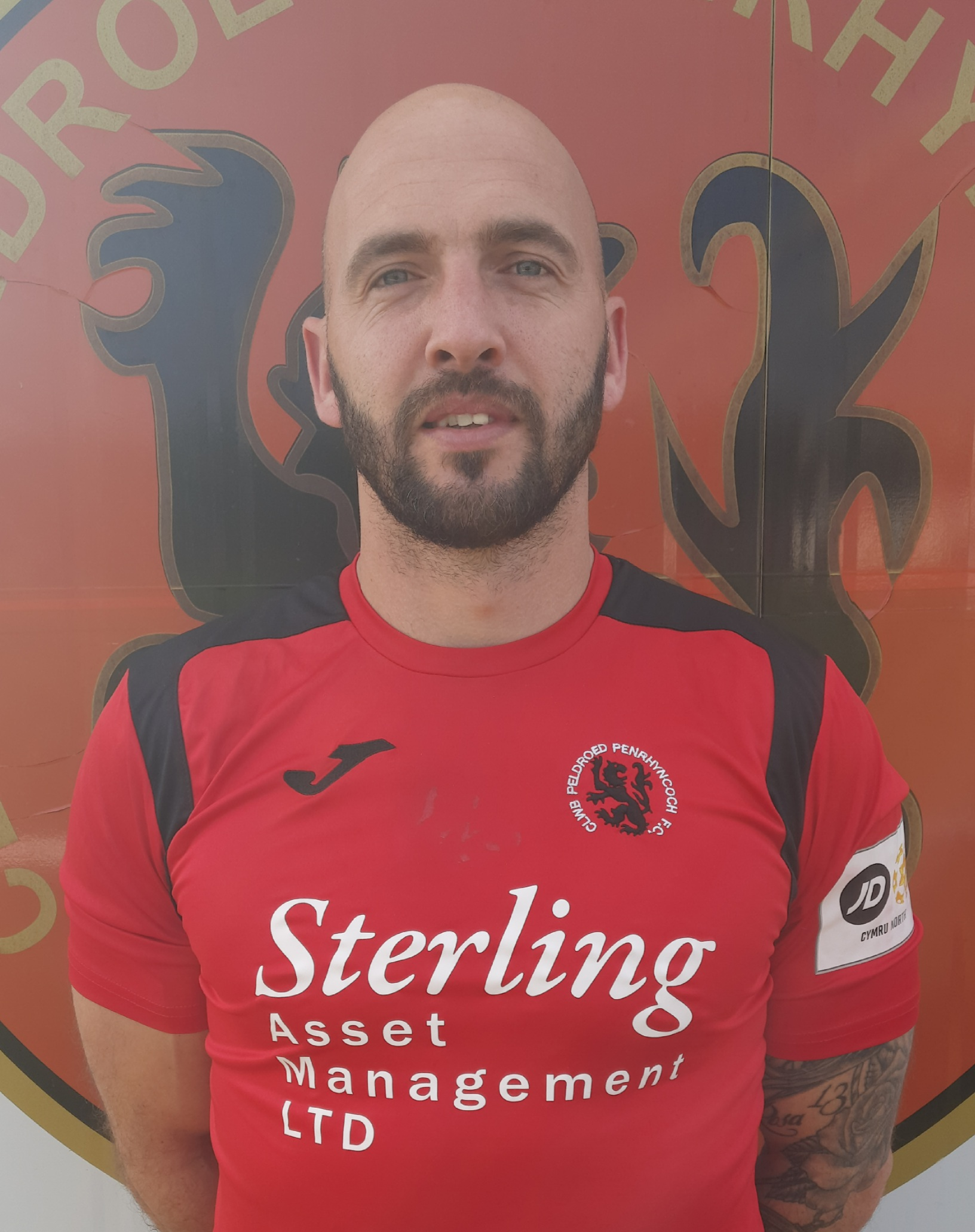
- Kellaway with Penrhyncoch in 2021

Personal information
- Full name: Geoffrey Allan Kellaway
- Date of birth: 7 April 1986 (age 40)
- Place of birth: Dorchester, England
- Position: Left winger

Team information
- Current team: Penrhyncoch

Youth career
- Aberystwyth Town

Senior career*
Years	Team	Apps	(Gls)
2003–2010	Aberystwyth Town	114	(24)
2010	Dandenong Thunder	6	(1)
2010–2011	Melbourne Victory	8	(0)
2011–2012	Aberystwyth Town	27	(8)
2012–2013	Llanelli	16	(1)
2013	Carmarthen Town	11	(3)
2013–2021	Aberystwyth Town	182	(44)
2021–	Penrhyncoch	108	(43)
- * Club domestic league appearances and goals as of 19:08, 30 September 2026 (UTC)

Geoffrey Allan Kellaway (born 7 April 1986) is an English footballer who plays as a winger for Penrhyncoch.

== Early life ==
Born in Dorchester, England, Kellaway moved to Wales as a teenager, growing up in Lampeter. He is a supporter of Manchester United.

== Club career ==
Kellaway began his career with Aberystwyth Town, making his debut during the 2003–04 season. He went on to make over 100 appearances for the club and also featured in the 2009 Welsh Cup final defeat to Bangor City. In May 2010, having been named in the 2009–10 Welsh Premier League team of the season, Kellaway joined Dandenong Thunder along with fellow Welsh Premier players Luke Sherbon and Jamie Reed, making his debut in a 1–0 victory over Hume City on 29 May 2010.

On 17 August 2010, he was signed to a three-month injury replacement contract with A-League side Melbourne Victory to cover for Matthew Kemp, after impressing in a trial match against the side. He made his debut for the club as a substitute during a 2–2 draw with North Queensland Fury, becoming the 500th player to make an appearance in the A-League. He was released by the Victory and returned to Britain at the end of the 2010–11 season.

In July 2011, he re-joined Aberystwyth Town. In June 2012 he moved to Llanelli but the club folded in April 2013. He had a brief spell with Carmarthen Town before returning to Aberystwyth Town for a third spell.

Kellaway signed a new contract to carry on playing for Aberystwyth for the 2019–2020 season. He scored 9 goals in 19 games in 2018–2019 ending up as the club's top goalscorer that season.

In June 2021, Kellaway joined Cymru North side Penrhyncoch.

== Personal life ==
Kellaway also works as a bathroom fitter alongside playing football.

== Honours ==
- Welsh Premier League Team of the Year: 2009–10
- Welsh Premier League Clubman of the Year: 2017–18
