= Liam Wooding =

Australian soccer player

Personal information
- Full name: Liam Christy Wooding
- Date of birth: 25 May 1993 (age 33)
- Place of birth: Adelaide, Australia
- Height: 1.75 m (5 ft 9 in)
- Positions: Forward; attacking midfielder

Team information
- Current team: Adelaide Olympic

Youth career
- 2009–2013: Adelaide United

Senior career*
Years	Team	Apps	(Gls)
2010	Adelaide Galaxy	9	(0)
2012	Adelaide United	1	(0)
2012	Birkalla	2	(0)
2013	MetroStars	20	(4)
2014	Northcote City	21	(4)
2015–2018	MetroStars	83	(20)
2019	South Adelaide Panthers	12	(6)
2019	MetroStars	12	(1)
2021–2022	South Adelaide Panthers	39	(2)
2023–	Adelaide Olympic	10	(2)

International career^{‡}
2012	Australia U-20	3	(1)
- * Club domestic league appearances and goals as of 11 September 2023 ‡ National team caps and goals as of 15 October 2012

Liam Wooding (born 25 May 1993) is an Australian footballer who plays for North Eastern MetroStars.

== Club career ==
=== Adelaide United ===
In 2009, he signed a youth contract with A-League club Adelaide United. He made his professional debut in the 2011-12 A-League season on 23 March 2012 in a round 27 match against Melbourne Heart at the Hindmarsh Stadium.

=== Adelaide Galaxy ===
In 2010, he was loaned out to FFSA Super League club Adelaide Galaxy in the off season where he made 9 appearances for the senior team.

=== MetroStars ===
In February 2013, Wooding agreed to join South Australian club North Eastern MetroStars, agreeing to a two-year deal.
