= Pierce Waring =

Australian footballer

Personal information
- Full name: Pierce Waring
- Date of birth: 18 November 1998 (age 27)
- Place of birth: Clayton, Victoria, Australia
- Height: 1.91 m (6 ft 3 in)
- Position: Forward

Team information
- Current team: Dandenong City
- Number: 10

Youth career
- FTS Academy
- Nunawading City
- 2015–2018: Melbourne Victory

Senior career*
Years	Team	Apps	(Gls)
2015–2018	Melbourne Victory NPL	49	(13)
2016–2018	Melbourne Victory	1	(0)
2018–2020	Cerezo Osaka U23	38	(3)
2018–2020	Cerezo Osaka	0	(0)
2021	Bentleigh Greens	12	(7)
2021	Sichuan Jiuniu	7	(2)
2022	Bentleigh Greens	16	(8)
2023	Green Gully	22	(13)
2024–2026	Oakleigh Cannons	32	(2)
2026–	Dandenong City	12	(4)

International career^{‡}
2015	Australia U17	3	(1)
2019	Australia U23	2	(3)
- * Club domestic league appearances and goals as of 29 August 2026 ‡ National team caps and goals as of 24 March 2019

Pierce Waring (born 18 November 1998) is an Australian professional footballer who plays as a forward for National Premier Leagues Victoria club Dandenong City.

== Personal life ==
Born in Melbourne to an Australian father and a Japanese mother, Waring moved to Shanghai when he was just two years old, as his parents were working in China, before moving to Japan for another four years. Waring subsequently moved back to Melbourne at the age of eight.

== Club career ==
=== Melbourne Victory Reserves ===
Waring made his youth debut in 2015 after gaining promotion from the under 20 team under John Aloisi. Waring won the 2016/2017 National Youth League Golden Boot.

=== Melbourne Victory ===
Pierce Waring signed his first professional A-League contract with the Melbourne Victory squad in September 2017. On 24 February 2018, he made his first appearance coming on in the 85th minute as a substitute for Besart Berisha against Adelaide United.

Waring made his debut first-team start on 18 April 2018 in an AFC Champions League match against Shanghai SIPG. In the same match, Waring scored his debut first-team goal in the 40th minute of the match, in an eventual 2–1 win.

=== Cerezo Osaka ===
On 4 July 2018, Waring joined J1 League club Cerezo Osaka.

=== Oakleigh Cannons ===
In 2024 NPL Victoria, Waring join with Oakleigh Cannons.

== International career ==
Waring represented Australia at the 2015 FIFA U-17 World Cup, scoring his first international goal against Germany.

== Honours ==
=== Club ===
- Melbourne Victory Reserves
  - 2016/17 NYL Golden Boot
