= Francesco Monterosso =

Australian soccer player

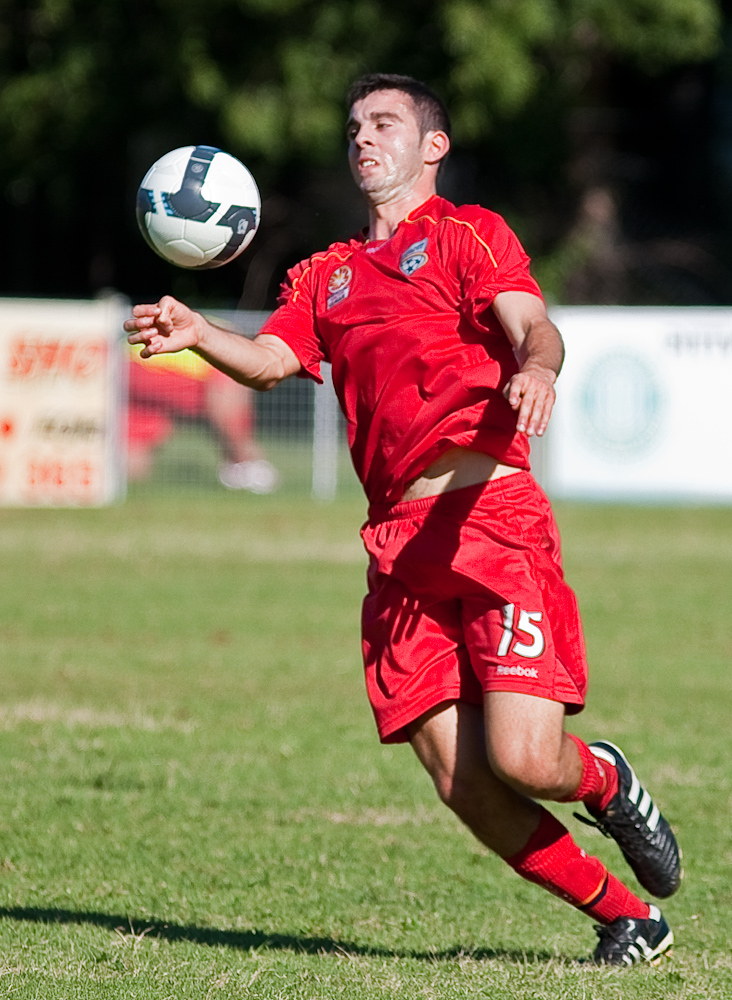

Personal information
- Full name: Francesco Battiste Monterosso
- Date of birth: 20 April 1991 (age 35)
- Place of birth: Adelaide, Australia
- Height: 1.87 m (6 ft 1 1/2 in)
- Position: Striker

Youth career
- 2006–2008: SASI
- 2008–2009: Adelaide United

Senior career*
Years	Team	Apps	(Gls)
2007–2008	MetroStars	1	(0)
2009–2011	Adelaide United	7	(0)
2009	→ MetroStars (loan)	10	(4)
2011–2012	MetroStars	30	(6)

International career^{‡}
2009	Australia U-20	1	(0)
- * Club domestic league appearances and goals as of 24 September 2012 ‡ National team caps and goals as of 17:30, 29 October 2010 (UTC)

Francesco Monterosso (born 20 April 1991 in Adelaide) is an Australian former professional soccer player.

== Club career ==
On 3 June 2009 he was signed to a two-year deal by Adelaide United after scoring 13 goals in 19 appearances for their inaugural National Youth League squad.

On 16 August 2009 he made his senior debut for Adelaide, coming off the bench in the 84th minute against Sydney FC.

He has signed with MetroStars for the 2011 South Australian Super league. Monterosso capped off an impressive return to his former club with a brace of goals against the Modbury Jets in the Carlsberg Cup.

== A-League career statistics ==
(Correct as of 19 March 2011)

Club	Season	League		Finals		Continental		International		Total	
Club	Season	Apps	Goals	Apps	Goals	Apps	Goals	Apps	Goals	Apps	Goals
Adelaide United	2009–10	5	0	0	0	1	0	0	0	6	0
Adelaide United	2010–11	2	0	0	0	0	0	0	0	2	0
Total		7	0	0	0	1	0	0	0	8	0

== Honours ==
Personal honours:

- National Youth League Top Scorer: 2008–2009 with Adelaide United – 13 goals
- National Youth League Top Scorer: 2009–2010 with Adelaide United – 17 goals
