= Central Coast Mariners Academy =

- Full name: Central Coast Mariners Football Club Academy
- Nickname: Mariners
- Founded: 2008 (as Central Coast Mariners Youth); 2012 (as Central Coast Mariners Academy)
- Ground: Pluim Park
- Capacity: 2,000
- Chairman: Vacant
- Head Coach: Lucas Vilela
- League: NSW League One; A-League Youth
- 2026: 12th of 16
- Website: http://www.ccmariners.com.au
Home colours	Away colours	Third colours

The Central Coast Mariners Academy (CCMA) is the youth system of Central Coast Mariners FC based in Gosford, Australia. The academy teams play in the National Premier Leagues NSW competition, the top flight of the NPL NSW system. Senior players occasionally play in the academy side, as in the case when they're recovering from injury. Lucas Vilela is the current academy first grade coach. They train at the Central Coast Mariners Centre of Excellence and play their home games at Pluim Park.

== Academy team history ==
=== First Academy (2012–2014) ===
Central Coast Mariners Academy was formed as a joint venture between the Mariners and Central Coast Football to provide a junior development pathway to the NYL and A-League sides. Prior to 2012 the academy existed solely as a junior side; however in 2012 it was accepted to participate in the New South Wales Premier League. In October 2012 the club announced that Joey Peters had been appointed as senior coach. The club finished tenth from twelve clubs in its first two seasons.

CCMA prided themselves on producing talented young players and providing a pathway for Central Coast Mariners in the Hyundai A-League. Based on appearances for CCMA 15 year old Daniel McFarlane earned trials in the UK with Swansea City and Birmingham City. Patrick Zwaanswijk signed up McFarlane up for the CCMA in the National Youth League. Local players Steve Whyte, Josh Forbes, Bradley Wilson and Nathan Verity also made sufficient impressions in the NSWPL season to earn them a contract in the NYL squad.

Following disputes between the Mariners and Central Coast Football over technical and financial aspects of the program, the Football NSW licence to run the representative side on the Central Coast was handed back to Central Coast Football in August 2014 and the academy program was closed.

=== 2015–present ===
A competitions review conducted by Football NSW in 2015 recommended that academy sides from Sydney FC and Western Sydney Wanderers be included in the National Premier Leagues NSW competitions, with the inclusion of a Central Coast side to be determined between the Mariners and Central Coast Football. The Mariners subsequently applied for entry to the NPL and SAP in August 2015 and were accepted from the 2016 season onwards, replacing Central Coast FC. The Mariners won the 2020 NPL2 premiership and grand final, as well as the 2022 NPL2 premiership, securing their promotion to the 2023 NPL competition.

On 13 January 2026, the Central Coast Mariners Academy was placed into liquidation. On 23 January 2026, the APL announced it would take over operations of the academy through to the end of the 2026 NPL season.

== Players ==
As of February 2024

Note: Flags indicate national team as defined under FIFA eligibility rules; some limited exceptions apply. Players may hold more than one non-FIFA nationality.

No.	Pos.	Nation	Player
2	DF	AUS	Michael Paragalli
3	DF	SSD	Cher Deng
4	DF	AUS	Parker Williams
5	DF	AUS	Harry Menham
6	MF	AUS	Jordan Small
7	MF	AUS	Arthur De Lima
8	MF	MLT	Lucas Scicluna
9	FW	AUS	Nicholas Duarte
10	FW	AUS	Luka Smyth
11	FW	AUS	Donatien Niyonkuru
12	MF	AUS	Taye Hedley
13		AUS	Yani Nassis
14	DF	AUS	Jacob Tresoglavic
15	MF	AUS	Amponsah Antwi

No.	Pos.	Nation	Player
18	FW	AUS	Adil Toska
19		AUS	Harvey James
20	GK	AUS	Jai Ajanovic
21		AUS	Agieg Aluk
22	DF	AUS	Rocco Smith
24		AUS	Angus Reid
26		AUS	Freddie Clunas
27	DF	AUS	Sasha Kuzevski
30	GK	AUS	Daniel Vickers
35	MF	AUS	Haine Eames
36		AUS	Adam Hall
37	FW	AUS	Bailey Brandtman
38		AUS	Will Rankin
40	GK	AUS	Dylan Peraic-Cullen
—		AUS	Prayaag Thapa

== Current staff ==
Lucas Vilela	1st Grade Head Coach
Andy Bernal; Matt Simon	1st Grade Assistant coach
Blake Longford	1st Grade Manager

== Honours ==
Youth

- NPL 2/NSW League One Premiership
  - Runners-up: 2014
  - Premiers: 2020, 2022
  - Champions: 2020

Under-23s

- Y-League Premiership
  - Premiers: 2009–10, 2011–12
  - Runners-up: 2010–11, 2012–13

== Notable academy and youth team players ==
The following list of youth team or Academy players have been capped in a full international.

- (Australia) Max Balard
- (Australia) Patrick Beach
- (Australia) Anthony Caceres
- (Australia) Mitchell Duke
- (Australia) Bernie Ibini-Isei
- (Australia) Garang Kuol
- (Australia) Josh Nisbet
- (Australia) Mathew Ryan
- (Australia) Lewis Miller
- (Australia) Gianni Stensness
- (Cook Islands) Cade Mapu
- (Lebanon) Jackson Khoury
- (Malaysia) Quentin Cheng
- (Malaysia) Brad Tapp
- (Malta) Trent Buhagiar
- (New Zealand) Lachlan Bayliss
- (Papua New Guinea) Brad McDonald
- (Philippines) Jesse Curran
- (South Sudan) Dor Jok
- (South Sudan) Teng Kuol
- (Tanzania) Charles M'Mombwa

== See also ==
- Central Coast Mariners FC
- Central Coast Mariners FC (W-League)
