= Perth Glory FC Youth =

Perth Glory Youth and Under-23s
- Full name: Perth Glory Football Club (Youth and Under-23s)
- Nicknames: Glory, Glory NPL
- Founded: 2008
- Ground: Sam Kerr Football Centre
- Capacity: 2,500
- Manager: N/A
- League: NPL Western Australia
- 2026: 10th of 12
Home colours	Away colours	Third colours

Perth Glory Youth is the highest level squad within the youth system setup of Perth Glory Football Club based in Perth, Western Australia, Australia. They play in the National Premier Leagues and play the majority of their home games at Sam Kerr Football Centre in Queens Park. The Perth Glory Under-23s is an academy teams that formerly played in the Y-League.

== Youth team history ==
Perth Glory first entered a youth team in the 2002 Soccer West Coast Premier League as Future Glory. The team coached by Frank Arok finished seventh out of 12 teams in the league. They lost 2–1 to ECU Joondalup in the State Challenge Cup Final. The club withdrew the youth team ahead of the 2003 season, citing the uncertain future of the National Soccer League.

== Youth current squad ==
To be eligible to play in the first team, players must be between the age of 15 and 24. Two overage players are allowed for A-League players who are returning from injury or players trialing with the A-League team.

As of 17 August 2019

Note: Flags indicate national team as defined under FIFA eligibility rules; some limited exceptions apply. Players may hold more than one non-FIFA nationality.

No.	Pos.	Nation	Player
1	GK	AUS	Nicholas Speca
2	GK	AUS	Jackson Lee
3	MF	AUS	Aidan Edwards
4	DF	AUS	Cameron Murray
5	DF	AUS	Daniel Walsh
6	FW	AUS	Ethan Brooks
8	FW	AUS	Gomo Dukuly
9	MF	AUS	Henry Hore
10	MF	AUS	Jack Leech
12	MF	AUS	Sasa Njecic
13		AUS	Nicholas McDonald

No.	Pos.	Nation	Player
14	DF	AUS	Nicholas Walsh
16	DF	SOM	Zayd Farah
17	FW	AUS	Trent Ostler
18		AUS	Abias Bukuru
19	MF	AUS	Daniel Stynes
20	MF	AUS	Jordan Abrahams
22	MF	AUS	Joshua Samson
23	DF	AUS	Luke Bodnar
—	DF	AUS	Joshua Rawlins
—		AUS	Jayden Leader
—		AUS	Jaidon Selden

== Under-23s team history ==
The team was founded in 2008, as a Perth Glory representative team for the inaugural season of the National Youth League competition. On 25 September 2013, it was confirmed that the team would compete in the National Premier Leagues Western Australia competition for the 2014 season onwards.

== Honours ==
- State Challenge Cup
  - Runners-up (1): 2002
- National Premier Leagues Western Australia Premiership
  - Runners-up (1): 2018
- National Premier Leagues Western Australia Championship
  - Runners-up (1): 2018
- Y-League Premiership

Runners-up (1): 2009–10

- Y-League Championship

Runners-up (1): 2009–10
