= 2009–10 National Youth League (Australia) =

A-League National Youth League
- Season: 2009–10
- Dates: 11 September 2009 – 20 March 2010
- Matches: 111
- Top goalscorer: Chris Harold (16)
- Biggest away win: Newcastle Jets Youth 0–6 Central Coast Mariners Youth (23 October 2009)
- Highest scoring: Adelaide United Youth 4–4 Australian Institute of Sport (14 November 2009); Adelaide United Youth 4–4 Brisbane Roar Youth (6 February 2010)

The 2009–10 A-League National Youth League season was the second season of the Australian A-League National Youth League soccer competition. Like the previous season, the season ran alongside the 2009–10 A-League season.

== Teams ==
Team	Location	Stadium	Stadium capacity
Adelaide United Youth	Adelaide	Hindmarsh Stadium	16,500
A.I.S. Football Program	Canberra	Australian Institute of Sport	Unknown
Brisbane Roar Youth	Brisbane	Goodwin Park	1,500
Central Coast Mariners Youth	Gosford	Pluim Park	2,200
Melbourne Victory Youth	Melbourne	Veneto Club	Unknown
Newcastle Jets Youth	Newcastle	Energy Australia Stadium	33,000
Perth Glory Youth	Perth	Members Equity Stadium	20,500
Sydney Youth	Sydney	Sydney Football Stadium	45,500

== League table ==
Pos	Team	Pld	W	D	L	GF	GA	GD	Pts	Qualification
1	Central Coast Mariners Academy	24	12	8	4	48	34	+14	44	Qualification to Finals Series
2	Perth Glory Youth	24	13	4	7	39	35	+4	43	Qualification to Finals Series
3	Adelaide United Youth	24	10	10	4	50	37	+13	40	Qualification to Finals Series
4	Gold Coast United Youth (C)	24	10	9	5	54	37	+17	39	Qualification to Finals Series
5	Sydney FC Youth	24	11	6	7	43	33	+10	39	
6	Melbourne Victory Youth	24	7	8	9	36	37	−1	29	
7	Newcastle Jets Youth	24	8	3	13	36	48	−12	27	
8	Brisbane Roar Youth	24	5	5	14	38	58	−20	20	
9	AIS Football Program	24	3	5	16	32	57	−25	14	

Rules for classification: 1) points; 2) goal difference; 3) number of goals scored.
(C) Champions

== Results ==
The 2009–10 A-League National Youth League season was played over 27 rounds, followed by a finals series.

Home \ Away	ADL	AIS	BRI	CCM	GCU	MVC	NEW	PER	SYD	ADL	AIS	BRI	CCM	GCU	MVC	NEW	PER	SYD
Adelaide United Youth		4–4	2–2	1–1	3–2	3–3	1–0	2–1	1–1			4–4	0–0	1–1		5–2	0–1	
A.I.S. Football Program	1–4		0–2	0–0	1–1	0–2	2–1	3–4	1–3	0–2		1–2			5–1		0–2	
Brisbane Roar Youth	1–2	4–2		1–2	2–2	0–2	0–1	3–1	0–2				1–3	2–2		2–1		1–2
Central Coast Mariners Youth	2–1	2–2	4–3		3–3	2–1	1–4	0–1	0–0		2–0			2–2		3–2	0–1	
Gold Coast United Youth	0–2	2–1	5–1	2–5		1–1	2–1	4–0	2–0		5–0				2–2		0–1	4–3
Melbourne Victory Youth	2–0	1–3	1–1	4–1	0–5		0–2	1–1	0–1		2–4	6–1	1–1					0–1
Newcastle Jets Youth	2–5	4–1	3–2	0–6	0–2	1–2		0–1	1–1	2–5	3–1			2–2	0–0			
Perth Glory Youth	1–1	3–2	3–2	2–3	1–2	0–0	4–0		3–2			2–1			0–3	2–3		3–3
Sydney Youth	3–1	1–0	5–0	1–3	3–1	2–1	2–0	0–1		3–3	2–2		1–2			1–3		

Updated to match(es) played on unknown. Source:
Legend: Blue = home team win; Yellow = draw; Red = away team win.

=== Finals series ===
==== Semi-finals ====
13 March 2010	Central Coast Mariners Youth	1–3	Gold Coast United Youth	Gosford
	Nikas 30' (pen.)	Report	Wearing 1'; Halloran 4'; Harold 83'	Stadium: Pluim Park

14 March 2010	Perth Glory Youth	1–0	Adelaide United Youth	Perth
	Trifiro 23'	Report		Stadium: Clipsal Stadium

==== Grand Final ====
20 March 2010	Perth Glory Youth	1–2	Gold Coast United Youth	Melbourne
	Evans 75'	Report	Harold 82'; Minniecon 90'	Stadium: Etihad Stadium

== Season statistics ==
=== Scoring ===
- First goal of the season: 78 minutes – Francesco Monterosso for Adelaide United Youth against Central Coast Mariners Youth (11 September 2009)
- Fastest goal in a match: 1 minute – Mario Simic for Newcastle Jets Youth against Sydney FC Youth (29 November 2009) & Ben Wearing for Gold Coast United Youth against Central Coast Mariners Youth (13 March 2010)
- Goal scored at the latest point in a match: 90+5 minutes – Tim Smits for Brisbane Roar Youth against Sydney FC Youth (31 January 2010)
- First own goal of the season: Steve Lewis Hesketh (Brisbane Roar Youth) for Perth Glory Youth, 9 minutes (18 September 2009)
- First hat-trick of the season: Nik Mrdja (Central Coast Mariners Youth) against Newcastle Jets Youth (23 October 2009)

==== Top scorers ====
Rank	Scorer	Club	Goals
1	(Australia) Francesco Monterosso	Adelaide United Youth	17
2	(Australia) Chris Harold	Gold Coast United Youth	14
3	(Australia) Kerem Bulut	Sydney Youth	13
4	(Australia) Panni Nikas	Central Coast Mariners Youth	12
5	(Australia) Andrew Barisic	Gold Coast United Youth	11
6	(Australia) Nathan Elasi	Melbourne Victory Youth	10
7	(Australia) Eli Babalj	Australian Institute of Sport	9
7	(Australia) Tim Smits	Brisbane Roar Youth	9
8	(Australia) Kamal Ibrahim	Australian Institute of Sport	8

=== Table-related statistics ===
==== Overall ====
- Most wins – Perth Glory Youth (13)
- Fewest wins – Australian Institute of Sport (3)
- Most losses – Australian Institute of Sport (16)
- Fewest losses – Central Coast Mariners Youth & Adelaide United Youth (4)
- Most goals scored – Gold Coast United Youth (54)
- Fewest goals scored – Australian Institute of Sport (32)
- Most goals conceded – Brisbane Roar Youth (58)
- Fewest goals conceded – Sydney Youth (33)
- Best goal difference – Gold Coast United Youth (+10)
- Worst goal difference – Australian Institute of Sport (−25)

== Awards ==
- Champions: Gold Coast United
- Minor Premiers: Central Coast Mariners
- Player of the Year: Panni Nikas, Central Coast Mariners
- Golden Boot: Chris Harrold (16 goals), Gold Coast United, (Francesco Monterosso, (17 goals), Was top scorer but ineligible due to being an A League contracted player)
- Fair Play Award: Brisbane Roar
