= 2014–15 Perth Glory FC season =

Perth Glory
2014–15 season
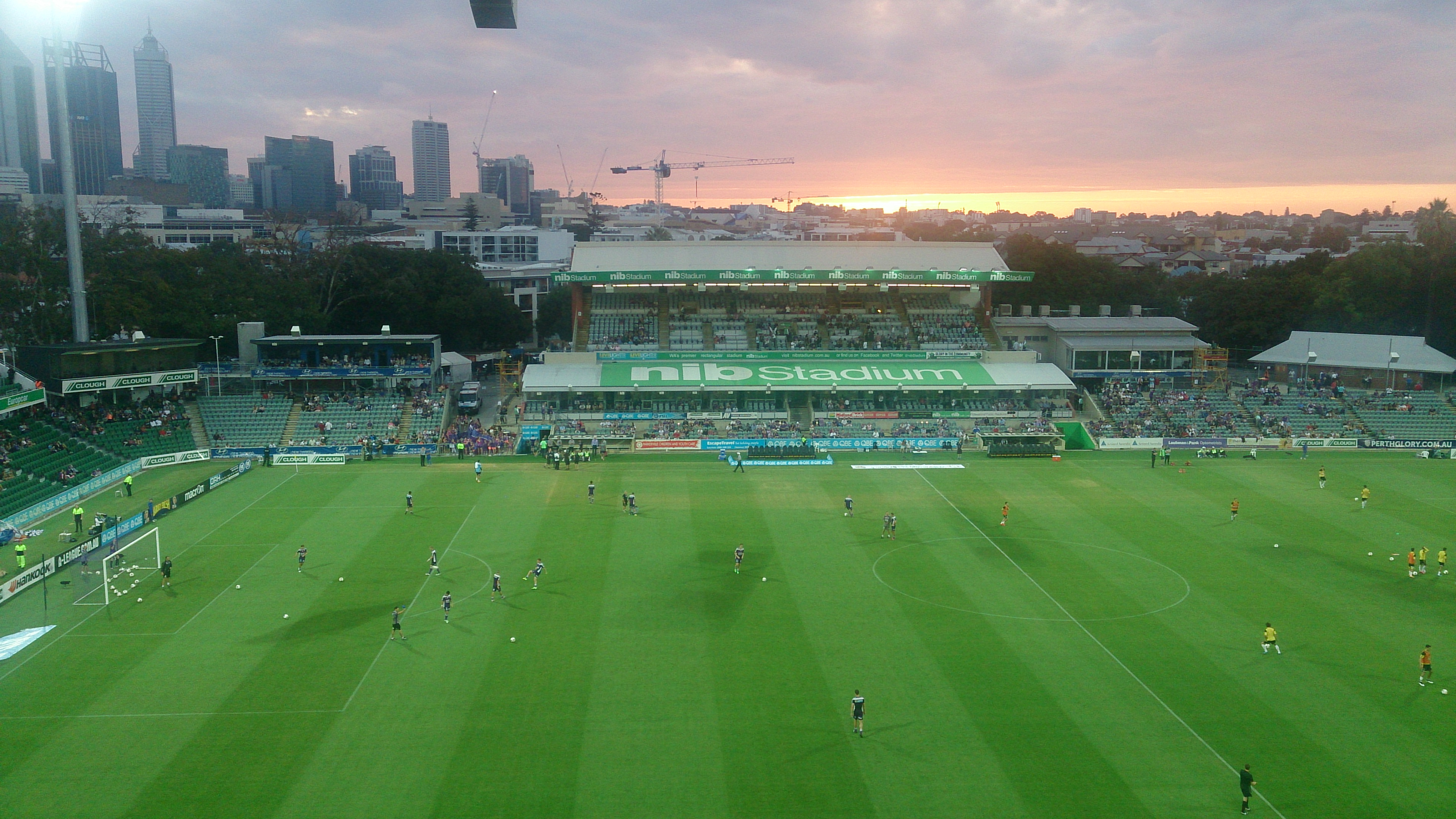
- Perth Glory training prior to a home game in 2015
- Chairman: Tony Sage
- Manager: Kenny Lowe
- Stadium: nib Stadium, Perth
- A-League: 7th (Note: Perth were disqualified from the Finals series and given a compulsory 7th place finish due to salary cap violations.)
- A-League Finals Series: Disqualified
- FFA Cup: Runners-up
- Top goalscorer: League: Andy Keogh (12); All: Andy Keogh (17)
- Highest home attendance: 12,271 vs Melbourne Victory; 25 January 2015
- Lowest home attendance: 5,821 vs Melbourne City; 19 April 2015
Home colours	Away colours

The 2014–15 Perth Glory FC season was the club's 18th season since its establishment in 1996. They participated in the A-League for the 10th time and the FFA Cup for the first time.

== Players ==
=== Squad information ===
Note: Flags indicate national team as defined under FIFA eligibility rules; some limited exceptions apply. Players may hold more than one non-FIFA nationality.

No.	Pos.	Nation	Player
1	GK	AUS	Danny Vukovic
4	DF	AUS	Riley Woodcock
5	MF	AUS	Rostyn Griffiths
6	DF	AUS	Dino Djulbic
7	MF	NED	Youssouf Hersi
8	MF	AUS	Ruben Zadkovich
9	FW	IRL	Andy Keogh
10	MF	SRB	Nebojša Marinković
11	MF	AUS	Richard Garcia
13	MF	AUS	Diogo Ferreira
14	FW	AUS	Chris Harold
15	FW	AUS	Jamie Maclaren

No.	Pos.	Nation	Player
16	FW	BRA	Sidnei
18	GK	AUS	Jack Duncan
19	DF	AUS	Josh Risdon
20	MF	AUS	Daniel De Silva (on loan from Roma)
21	DF	AUS	Scott Jamieson
23	DF	AUS	Michael Thwaite (Captain)
25	MF	AUS	Mitchell Oxborrow (Youth)
27	MF	GER	Dragan Paljić
28	DF	SLO	Denis Kramar (on loan from Getafe B)
30	GK	AUS	Jordan Thurtell
31	MF	AUS	Jacob Collard (Youth)

=== Transfers in ===
No.	Pos.	Nat.	Name	Age	Moving from	Type	Transfer window	Ends	Transfer fee	Source
1	GK	(Australia)	Danny Vukovic	29	(Japan) Vegalta Sendai	End of loan	Pre-season	2016	Free	perthglory.com.au
7	MF	(Netherlands)	Youssouf Hersi	31	Western Sydney Wanderers	Transfer	Pre-season	2016	Free	perthglory.com.au
6	DF	(Australia)	Dino Djulbic	31	(United Arab Emirates) Al Wahda	Transfer	Pre-season	2016	Free	perthglory.com.au
9	FW	(Republic of Ireland)	Andy Keogh	28	(England) Millwall	Transfer	Pre-season	2017		footballaustralia.com.au
17	MF	(Australia)	Mitch Nichols	25	(Japan) Cerezo Osaka	Loan	Pre-season	2015	Free	footballaustralia.com.au
30	GK	(Australia)	Jordan Thurtell	17	FFA Centre of Excellence	Transfer	Pre-season	2016	Free	footballaustralia.com.au
13	MF	(Australia)	Diogo Ferreira	24	Brisbane Roar	Transfer	Pre-season	2016	Free	perthglory.com.au
8	MF	(Australia)	Ruben Zadkovich	28	Newcastle Jets	Transfer	Pre-season	2016	Free	perthglory.com.au
11	MF	(Australia)	Richard Garcia	32	(United States) Minnesota United FC	Transfer	Pre-season	2016	Free	perthglory.com.au
25	MF	(Australia)	Mitchell Oxborrow	19	Newcastle Jets	Transfer	Pre-season	2015	Free	perthglory.com.au
27	MF	(Germany)	Dragan Paljić	31	(Netherlands) Heracles	Injury Replacement	Mid-season	2015		a-league.com.au
28	DF	(Slovenia)	Denis Kramar	23	(Spain) Getafe B	Loan	Mid-season	2015		a-league.com.au

=== Transfers out ===
No.	Pos.	Nat.	Name	Age	Moving to	Type	Transfer window	Transfer fee	Source
7	MF	(Australia)	Jacob Burns	36		Retired	Pre-season		footballaustralia.com.au
13	MF	(Australia)	Travis Dodd	34		Retired	Pre-season		footballaustralia.com.au
14	MF	(Scotland)	Steven McGarry	34		Retired	Pre-season		au.news.yahoo.com/thewest
4	MF	(Australia)	Ryan Edwards	20	(England) Reading	End of loan	Pre-season	Free	footballaustralia.com.au
28	FW	(Lithuania)	Darvydas Šernas	29	(Turkey) Gaziantepspor	End of loan	Pre-season	Free	footballaustralia.com.au
11	MF	(Australia)	Adrian Zahra	23	(Malta) Valletta	End of contract	Pre-season	Free	footballaustralia.com.au
9	FW	(New Zealand)	Shane Smeltz	32	Sydney FC	Transfer	Pre-season	Free	footballaustralia.com.au
2	DF	(Australia)	Jack Clisby	22	Melbourne City	Transfer	Mid-season	Free	melbournecityfc.com.au
3	DF	(Australia)	Brandon O'Neill	20		Released	Mid-season		a-league.com.au
26	MF	(Australia)	Harry O'Brien	20		Released	Mid-season		perthglory.com.au
24	DF	(Australia)	Matthew Davies	20	(Malaysia) Pahang	Released	Mid-season		perthglory.com.au
17	MF	(Australia)	Mitch Nichols	25	(Japan) Cerezo Osaka	Loan terminated	Mid-season		a-league.com.au
22	MF	(Australia)	Cameron Edwards	23	(Malaysia) Putrajaya SPA	Released	Mid-season		news.com.au

== Technical staff ==
Position	Name
Manager	(England) Kenny Lowe
Assistant manager	(England) Andrew Ord
Youth Team Manager	(Australia) Gareth Naven
Goalkeeping coach	(Australia) Danny Milosevic
Strength & Conditioning Coach	(Australia) Warren Andrews
Physiotherapist	(Australia) Chris Hutchinson

== Statistics ==
=== Squad statistics ===
N	Pos.	Nat.	Name	Total					A-League					FFA Cup
N	Pos.	Nat.	Name	Apps	Goals	Yellow card	Second yellow card	Red card	Apps	Goals	Yellow card	Second yellow card	Red card	Apps	Goals	Yellow card	Second yellow card	Red card
1	GK	(Australia)	Danny Vukovic	32	0	0	0	0	27	0	0	0	0	5	0	0	0	0
4	DF	(Australia)	Riley Woodcock	1	0	0	0	0	0+1	0	0	0	0	0	0	0	0	0
5	MF	(Australia)	Rostyn Griffiths	29	3	9	0	0	24+1	3	8	0	0	4	0	1	0	0
6	DF	(Australia)	Dino Djulbic	31	3	4	0	1	26	3	3	0	1	5	0	1	0	0
7	MF	(Netherlands)	Youssouf Hersi	11	0	1	0	0	7+1	0	0	0	0	3	0	1	0	0
8	MF	(Australia)	Ruben Zadkovich	15	1	4	0	1	8+5	1	4	0	1	1+1	0	0	0	0
9	FW	(Republic of Ireland)	Andy Keogh	32	17	3	0	0	27	12	3	0	0	5	5	0	0	0
10	MF	(Serbia)	Nebojša Marinković	30	10	4	0	0	22+3	5	4	0	0	4+1	5	0	0	0
11	MF	(Australia)	Richard Garcia	30	2	5	0	0	20+5	2	4	0	0	5	0	1	0	0
13	MF	(Australia)	Diogo Ferreira	10	0	1	0	0	2+5	0	0	0	0	2+1	0	1	0	0
14	FW	(Australia)	Chris Harold	19	4	1	0	0	9+8	3	1	0	0	0+2	1	0	0	0
15	FW	(Australia)	Jamie Maclaren	23	10	1	0	0	7+13	9	1	0	0	1+2	1	0	0	0
16	FW	(Brazil)	Sidnei	12	1	2	0	0	6+4	1	2	0	0	1+1	0	0	0	0
18	GK	(Australia)	Jack Duncan	1	0	0	0	0	1	0	0	0	0	0	0	0	0	0
19	DF	(Australia)	Josh Risdon	30	1	4	1	0	25	1	4	0	0	4+1	0	0	1	0
20	MF	(Australia)	Daniel De Silva	21	4	1	0	0	13+5	3	1	0	0	2+1	1	0	0	0
21	DF	(Australia)	Scott Jamieson	30	1	4	0	0	24+2	1	4	0	0	4	0	0	0	0
23	DF	(Australia)	Michael Thwaite	31	0	5	0	0	27	0	5	0	0	4	0	0	0	0
25	MF	(Australia)	Mitchell Oxborrow	2	0	1	0	0	2	0	1	0	0	0	0	0	0	0
27	MF	(Germany)	Dragan Paljić	12	0	1	0	0	6+6	0	1	0	0	0	0	0	0	0
28	DF	(Slovenia)	Denis Kramar	6	1	2	1	0	4+2	1	2	1	0	0	0	0	0	0
30	GK	(Australia)	Jordan Thurtell	0	0	0	0	0	0	0	0	0	0	0	0	0	0	0
31	MF	(Australia)	Jacob Collard	0	0	0	0	0	0	0	0	0	0	0	0	0	0	0
Players no longer at the club:
2	DF	(Australia)	Jack Clisby	7	0	2	0	0	1+4	0	0	0	0	2	0	2	0	0
3	DF	(Australia)	Brandon O'Neill	5	0	0	0	0	0+3	0	0	0	0	0+2	0	0	0	0
17	MF	(Australia)	Mitch Nichols	17	0	3	1	0	10+4	0	2	1	0	3	0	1	0	0
22	MF	(Australia)	Cameron Edwards	0	0	0	0	0	0	0	0	0	0	0	0	0	0	0
24	DF	(Australia)	Matthew Davies	0	0	0	0	0	0	0	0	0	0	0	0	0	0	0
26	MF	(Australia)	Harry O'Brien	0	0	0	0	0	0	0	0	0	0	0	0	0	0	0

- Last updated: 25 April 2015
- Source: au.soccerway.com
- (yellow card) = Number of bookings; (second yellow card) = Number of sending offs after a second yellow card; (red card) = Number of sending offs by a direct red card.

== Pre-season and friendlies ==
15 July 2014 Kramer Memorial Cup	Inglewood United (Australia)	1–1 (4–3 p)	(Australia) Perth Glory	Perth, Australia
18:30 AWST (UTC+08:00)	Clarke 11'	Report	Keogh 28'	Stadium: Intiga Stadium

20 July 2014	Adelaide United (Australia)	1–0	(Australia) Perth Glory	Sydney, Australia
14:30 AWST (UTC+08:00)	Boogaard 72'	Report		Stadium: Belmore Sports Ground

27 July 2014 LFP World Challenge	Perth Glory (Australia)	1–1	(Spain) Málaga	Perth, Australia
15:00 AWST (UTC+08:00)	Keogh 56'	Report	Horta 31'	Stadium: nib Stadium; Attendance: 9,000; Referee: Alan Milliner

13 August 2014 Call to Arms Cup	Perth Glory (Australia)	1–2	(Western Australia) WA State Team	Perth, Australia
19:00 AWST (UTC+08:00)	Sidnei 85'	Report	Solomons 71'; Boi 84'	Stadium: Dalmatinac Park; Attendance: 800; Referee: Adam Fielding

17 August 2014	Gosnells City (Australia)	0–6	(Australia) Perth Glory	Perth, Australia
15:00 AWST (UTC+08:00)			Chris Harold (?); De Silva (?); Maclaren (?); D. Ferreira (?)	Stadium: Walter Padbury Reserve

27 August 2014	Cockburn City (Australia)	0–3	(Australia) Perth Glory	Perth, Australia
19:00 AWST (UTC+08:00)			Keogh 45' (pen.), 55'; O'Neill 80'	Stadium: Dalmatinac Park; Referee: David Bruce

31 August 2014	Rockingham City (Australia)	0–10	(Australia) Perth Glory	Perth, Australia
15:00 AWST (UTC+08:00)			Maclaren 5', 20', 23'; Harold 12', 15', 30', 36'; Nichols 41'; Sam 70'; Clarke 80'	Stadium: Lark Hill

4 September 2014	Adelaide United (Australia)	1–1	(Australia) Perth Glory	Adelaide, Australia
15:00 ACST (UTC+09:30)	Cirio 32'	Report	Thwaite 38'	Stadium: Coopers Stadium; Attendance: 0 (Behind closed doors); Referee: Rick Schneider

7 September 2014	Melbourne Victory (Australia)	3–0	(Australia) Perth Glory	Melbourne, Australia
14:00 AEST (UTC+10:00)	Finkler 35'; Berisha 69', 75' (pen.)	Report		Stadium: AAMI Park; Attendance: 0 (Behind closed doors); Referee: Shaun Evans

20 September 2014 Todd Harnwell's Testimonial	Sorrento (Australia)	1–5	(Australia) Perth Glory	Perth, Australia
14:00 AWST (UTC+08:00)	Vittiglia 80'		Edwards 5'; Harold 10', 22'; Knowles 82'; Collard 85'	Stadium: Percy Doyle Reserve; Referee: Mathew Cheeseman

26 September 2014	Melbourne City (Australia)	2–1	(Australia) Perth Glory	Melbourne, Australia
	Koren 15' (pen.); Dugandzic 62'	Report	Maclaren 88'	Stadium: AAMI Park; Attendance: 0 (Behind closed doors)

== Competitions ==
=== Overall ===
Competition	Started round	Final position / round	First match	Last match
A-League	—	7th	12 October 2014	25 April 2015
FFA Cup	Round of 32	Runners-up	5 August 2014	16 December 2014

=== A-League ===
==== League table ====
Pos	Team	Pld	W	D	L	GF	GA	GD	Pts	Qualification
1	Melbourne Victory (C)	27	15	8	4	56	31	+25	53	Qualification for 2016 AFC Champions League group stage and Finals series
2	Sydney FC	27	14	8	5	52	35	+17	50	Qualification for 2016 AFC Champions League group stage and Finals series
3	Adelaide United	27	14	4	9	47	32	+15	46	Qualification for 2016 AFC Champions League qualifying play-off and Finals series
4	Wellington Phoenix (Note: Wellington Phoenix cannot qualify for the AFC Champions League as they are not recognised as an AFC club.)	27	14	4	9	45	35	+10	46	Qualification for Finals series
5	Melbourne City	27	9	8	10	36	41	−5	35	Qualification for Finals series
6	Brisbane Roar	27	10	4	13	42	43	−1	34	Qualification for Finals series
7	Perth Glory (Note: Perth Glory disqualified from the Finals series and given a compulsory 7th-place finish due to salary cap violations.)	27	14	8	5	45	35	+10	50	
8	Central Coast Mariners	27	5	8	14	26	50	−24	23	
9	Western Sydney Wanderers	27	4	6	17	29	44	−15	18	
10	Newcastle Jets	27	3	8	16	23	55	−32	17	

Source: A-League
Rules for classification: 1) points; 2) goal difference; 3) number of goals scored.
(C) Champions

==== Results summary ====
Overall								Home						Away					
Pld	W	D	L	GF	GA	GD	Pts	W	D	L	GF	GA	GD	W	D	L	GF	GA	GD
27	14	8	5	45	35	+10	50	8	2	4	29	24	+5	6	6	1	16	11	+5

Last updated: 25 April 2015.
Source: ultimatealeague.com

==== Results by round ====
Round	1	2	3	4	5	6	7	8	9	10	11	12	13	14	15	16	17	18	19	20	21	22	23	24	25	26	27
Ground	A	H	A	H	A	H	H	A	A	H	H	A	A	H	H	H	A	A	H	A	H	A	H	A	H	H	A
Result	W	W	L	W	W	W	W	D	W	W	W	D	W	L	D	L	D	D	D	D	L	D	W	W	L	W	W
Position	3	1	5	4	1	1	1	1	1	1	1	1	1	1	1	1	1	1	1	1	4	4	4	2	3	3	7

Updated to match(es) played on 25 April 2015. Source: ultimatealeague.com
A = Away; H = Home; W = Win; D = Draw; L = Loss

==== Matches ====
12 October 2014 1	Wellington Phoenix	1–2	Perth Glory	Wellington
Sunday 17:00 NZDT	McGlinchey 73'	Report	Keogh 32'; Maclaren 86'	Stadium: Westpac Stadium; Attendance: 7,767; Referee: Alan Milliner

19 October 2014 2	Perth Glory	3–2	Brisbane Roar	Perth
Sunday 14:00 AWST	Keogh 49' (pen.), 74', 90+2'	Report	Kurtiši 39'; Henrique 55'	Stadium: nib Stadium; Attendance: 8,789; Referee: Shaun Evans

26 October 2014 3	Adelaide United	2–0	Perth Glory	Adelaide
Sunday 16:30 ACDT	Cirio 18'; Mabil 68'	Report		Stadium: Coopers Stadium; Attendance: 11,473; Referee: Kris Griffiths-Jones

1 November 2014 4	Perth Glory	2–1	Newcastle Jets	Perth
Saturday 16:30 AWST	Maclaren 77', 79'	Report	Jerónimo 74'	Stadium: nib Stadium; Attendance: 8,624; Referee: Ben Williams

9 November 2014 5	Central Coast Mariners	0–1	Perth Glory	Gosford
Saturday 17:00 AEDT		Report	Marinković 43'	Stadium: Central Coast Stadium; Attendance: 6,399; Referee: Peter Green

15 November 2014 6	Perth Glory	2–1	Western Sydney Wanderers	Perth
Saturday 18:45 AWST	Djulbic 9'; Jamieson 78'	Report	Sotirio 85'	Stadium: nib Stadium; Attendance: 12,166; Referee: Shaun Evans

21 November 2014 7	Perth Glory	2–1	Wellington Phoenix	Perth
Friday 18:45 AWST	De Silva 2'; Keogh 60'	Report	Krishna 84' (pen.)	Stadium: nib Stadium; Attendance: 9,233; Referee: Lucien Laverdure

29 November 2014 8	Brisbane Roar	1–1	Perth Glory	Brisbane
Saturday 16:00 AEST	Henrique 86'	Report	Djulbic 20'	Stadium: Suncorp Stadium; Attendance: 13,043; Referee: Strebre Delovski

4 December 2014 9	Sydney FC	1–2	Perth Glory	Sydney
Thursday 19:30 AEDT	Smeltz 57' (pen.)	Report	R. Griffiths 83'; Keogh 87' (pen.)	Stadium: Allianz Stadium; Attendance: 11,280; Referee: Alan Milliner

12 December 2014 10	Perth Glory	2–0	Newcastle Jets	Perth
Friday 18:45 AWST	Garcia 11'; Marinković 86'	Report		Stadium: nib Stadium; Attendance: 9,716; Referee: Kris Griffiths-Jones

20 December 2014 11	Perth Glory	4–1	Central Coast Mariners	Perth
Saturday 18:45 AWST	Harold 33', 79'; Keogh 35'; De Silva 71'	Report	Simon 49'	Stadium: nib Stadium; Attendance: 9,660; Referee: Peter Green

26 December 2014 12	Melbourne City	1–1	Perth Glory	Melbourne
Saturday 17:30 AEDT	Mooy 48'	Report	Garcia 62'	Stadium: AAMI Park; Attendance: 9,550; Referee: Alan Milliner

2 January 2015 13	Melbourne Victory	1–2	Perth Glory	Geelong
Friday 19:40 AEDT	Berisha 58' (pen.)	Report	Keogh 9'; Harold 16'	Stadium: Simonds Stadium; Attendance: 21,289; Referee: Shaun Evans

5 January 2015 14	Perth Glory	1–2	Adelaide United	Perth
Monday 17:00 AWST	Marinković 11'	Report	Goodwin 31'; Jeggo 48'	Stadium: nib Stadium; Attendance: 9,699; Referee: Strebre Delovski

25 January 2015 15	Perth Glory	3–3	Melbourne Victory	Perth
Sunday 17:00 AWST	Keogh 21'; R. Griffiths 78'; Maclaren 89'	Report	Ben Khalfallah 18'; Berisha 42'; Barbarouses 57'	Stadium: nib Stadium; Attendance: 12,271; Referee: Peter Green

7 February 2015 16	Perth Glory	1–3	Sydney FC	Perth
Saturday 19:00 AWST	Kramar 73'	Report	Janko 30'; Dimitrijević 69'; Ibini 89'	Stadium: nib Stadium; Attendance: 11,637; Referee: Kris Griffiths-Jones

15 February 2015 17	Adelaide United	1–1	Perth Glory	Adelaide
Thursday 16:30 ACDT	Sánchez 11'	Report	Marinković 53'	Stadium: Coopers Stadium; Attendance: 9,711; Referee: Ben Williams

22 February 2015 18	Melbourne City	0–0	Perth Glory	Melbourne
Sunday 17:00 AEDT		Report		Stadium: AAMI Park; Attendance: 6,486; Referee: Jarred Gillett

28 February 2015 19	Perth Glory	2–2	Brisbane Roar	Perth
Saturday 17:00 AWST	De Silva 26'; Djulbic 84'	Report	Solórzano 59'; McKay 62'	Stadium: nib Stadium; Attendance: 10,422; Referee: Ben Williams

7 March 2015 20	Melbourne Victory	1–1	Perth Glory	Melbourne
Saturday 19:30 AEDT	Georgievski 63'	Report	Keogh 43'	Stadium: AAMI Park; Attendance: 22,525; Referee: Kris Griffiths-Jones

14 March 2015 21	Perth Glory	1–2	Wellington Phoenix	Perth
Saturday 18:45 AWST	Zadkovich 29'	Report	Krishna 23', 78'	Stadium: nib Stadium; Attendance: 9,178; Referee: Chris Beath

22 March 2015 22	Central Coast Mariners	1–1	Perth Glory	Gosford
Sunday 15:00 AEDT	Montgomery 90+2'	Report	Maclaren 79'	Stadium: Central Coast Stadium; Attendance: 5,338; Referee: Ben Williams

28 March 2015 23	Perth Glory	3–2	Western Sydney Wanderers	Perth
Saturday 18:45 AWST	Sidnei 55'; R. Griffiths 68'; Risdon 87'	Report	Castelen 13'; Bulut 72'	Stadium: nib Stadium; Attendance: 9,415; Referee: Stephen Lucas

6 April 2015 24	Newcastle Jets	0–2	Perth Glory	Newcastle
Monday 17:00 AEDT		Report	Keogh 50'; Marinković 84'	Stadium: Hunter Stadium; Attendance: 4,162; Referee: Peter Green

10 April 2015 25	Perth Glory	0–3	Sydney FC	Perth
Friday 19:45 AWST		Report	Brosque 35', 65'; Ibini 60'	Stadium: nib Stadium; Attendance: 7,426; Referee: Kris Griffiths-Jones

19 April 2015 26	Perth Glory	3–1	Melbourne City	Perth
Sunday 19:30 AWST	Maclaren 42', 65', 87'	Report	Mooy 52'	Stadium: nib Stadium; Attendance: 5,821; Referee: Chris Beath

25 April 2015 27	Western Sydney Wanderers	1–2	Perth Glory	Parramatta
Saturday 17:00 AEST	Youlley 53'	Report	Maclaren 17'; Keogh 66'	Stadium: Pirtek Stadium; Attendance: 8,852; Referee: Matthew Conger

=== FFA Cup ===
5 August 2014 Round of 32	Newcastle Jets	0–2	Perth Glory	Newcastle
19:30 AEST		Report	Keogh 20', 88'	Stadium: Wanderers Oval; Attendance: 2,877; Referee: Kris Griffiths-Jones

23 September 2014 Round of 16	St Albans Saints (Victoria (state))	1–4	Perth Glory	Melbourne
19:30 AEST	McGuffie 68' (pen.)	Report	Marinković 37', 90+4'; Maclaren 62'; Keogh 72'	Stadium: Knights Stadium; Attendance: 3,500; Referee: Lucien Laverdure

29 October 2014 Quarter final	Perth Glory	4–2 (a.e.t.)	Melbourne Victory	Perth
19:00 AWST	Keogh 15' (pen.), 82'; De Silva 103'; Marinković 111'	Report	Ben Khalfallah 8'; Finkler 90+2'	Stadium: nib Stadium; Attendance: 3,899; Referee: Alan Milliner

11 November 2014 Semi-final	Bentleigh Greens (Victoria (state))	0–3	Perth Glory	Melbourne
19:30 AEDT		Report	Marinković 29', 50'; Harold 84'	Stadium: Kingston Heath Soccer Complex; Attendance: 3,300; Referee: Kris Griffiths-Jones

16 December 2014 Final	Adelaide United	1–0	Perth Glory	Adelaide
19:00 ACDT	Cirio 67'	Report		Stadium: Coopers Stadium; Attendance: 16,142; Referee: Chris Beath

== Awards ==
- NAB Young Footballer of the Month (April) – Jamie Maclaren
