= 2013–14 Perth Glory FC season =

Perth Glory FC
2013–14 season
- Chairman: Tony Sage
- Head coach: Alistair Edwards (until 17 December 2013); Kenny Lowe (from 20 December 2013)
- Stadium: nib Stadium, Perth (20,441)
- A-League: 8th
- Top goalscorer: Shane Smeltz, Steven McGarry (4)
Home colours	Away colours	Third colours

The 2013–14 Perth Glory FC season was the club's ninth season in the A-League and its 17th season since its establishment. It was Alistair Edwards' first full season in charge after the sacking of Ian Ferguson; however, he was subsequently sacked as Manager on 17 December 2013, and replaced on an interim basis by Kenny Lowe.

== Players ==
=== Squad ===
Note: Flags indicate national team as defined under FIFA eligibility rules; some limited exceptions apply. Players may hold more than one non-FIFA nationality.

No.	Pos.	Nation	Player
2	DF	AUS	Jack Clisby
3	MF	AUS	Brandon O'Neill (Youth)
4	MF	AUS	Ryan Edwards (On loan from Reading)
5	MF	AUS	Rostyn Griffiths
6	MF	AUS	Cameron Edwards
7	MF	AUS	Jacob Burns (Captain)
8	MF	SRB	Nebojša Marinković
9	FW	NZL	Shane Smeltz
10	FW	AUS	Jamie Maclaren (Youth)
11	MF	AUS	Adrian Zahra
13	MF	AUS	Travis Dodd
14	MF	SCO	Steven McGarry
16	FW	BRA	Sidnei
17	FW	AUS	Chris Harold

No.	Pos.	Nation	Player
18	GK	AUS	Jack Duncan (Youth)
19	DF	AUS	Joshua Risdon
20	MF	AUS	Daniel De Silva (Youth)
21	DF	AUS	Scott Jamieson
23	DF	AUS	Michael Thwaite (Vice Captain)
24	DF	MAS	Matthew Davies (Youth)
25	DF	AUS	Riley Woodcock (Youth)
26	FW	AUS	Harry O'Brien
27	MF	AUS	Dean Evans (3-month injury replacement)
28	FW	LTU	Darvydas Šernas (On loan from Gaziantepspor)
30	GK	AUS	Devon Spence (Youth)
36	DF	FRA	William Gallas
39	GK	AUS	Luke Radonich

== Transfers ==
=== Winter ===
==== In ====
Player	From†	Transfer Price
(Australia) Cameron Edwards	(Australia) Melbourne Heart	Free
(Australia) Isaka Cernak	(New Zealand) Wellington Phoenix	Free
(Australia) Jack Duncan	(Australia) Newcastle Jets	Free
(Malaysia) Matthew Davies	(Australia) Perth Glory Youth	Promotion
(Australia) Daniel De Silva	(Australia) Perth Glory Youth	Promotion
(Australia) Riley Woodcock	(Australia) Perth Glory Youth	Promotion
(Australia) Jamie Maclaren	(England) Blackburn Rovers	Free
(Japan) Ryo Nagai	(Japan) Cerezo Osaka	Loan
(Brazil) Sidnei	Free agent	
(Australia) Ryan Edwards	(England) Reading	Loan
(Australia) Ljubo Miličević	(Australia) Melbourne Knights	
(Australia) Dean Evans	Free agent	Injury Replacement
(France) William Gallas	Free agent	

==== Out ====
Player	To†	Transfer Price
(Argentina) Matías Córdoba	(Bolivia) Oriente Petrolero	Free
(Australia) Dean Heffernan	(Australia) Western Sydney Wanderers	Release
(Australia) Evan Berger	(Australia) Marconi Stallions	Release
(Australia) Nick Ward	Free agent	Release
(Australia) Lewis Italiano	(New Zealand) Wellington Phoenix	Release
(Republic of Ireland) Liam Miller	(Australia) Brisbane Roar	Free
(New Zealand) Storm Roux	(Australia) Central Coast Mariners	Free
(Australia) Neil Young	–	Release
(Australia) Ljubo Miličević	–	Release
(Australia) Steve Pantelidis	(Malaysia) Selangor FA	Free

=== Summer ===
==== In ====
Player	From†	Transfer Price
(Lithuania) Darvydas Šernas	(Turkey) Gaziantepspor	Loan until end of season
(Serbia) Nebojša Marinković	Free agent	
(Australia) Rostyn Griffiths	(China) Guangzhou R&F	

==== Out ====
Player	To†	Transfer Price
(Japan) Ryo Nagai	(Japan) Cerezo Osaka	Termination of Loan
(Australia) Isaka Cernak	(Australia) Central Coast Mariners	Free
(Australia) Ndumba Makeche	(Malaysia) FELDA United	Free
(Australia) Danny Vukovic	(Japan) Vegalta Sendai	Loan

== Competitions ==
=== Overall ===
Competition	Started round	Current position / round	Final position / round	First match	Last match
A-League	—	—	8th	13 October 2013	13 April 2014
National Youth League	—	—	9th	26 October 2013	1 March 2014
National Premier League	—	10th		8 March 2014	23 August 2014

=== A-League ===
==== Pre-season ====
6 July 2013 Friendly	Kwinana United	0–3	Perth Glory	Perth
Saturday 14:00 AWST		Report	Sidnei 16'; McGarry 48'; Smeltz 75'	Stadium: Kelly Park; Attendance: 1,200; Referee: Trent Fleskens

13 July 2013 Friendly	Gosnells City	1–9	Perth Glory	Perth
Saturday 15:00 AWST	D. Francis 25'	Report	B. O'Neill 2'; Nagai 4'; Sidnei 13'; Jamieson 30'; Logue 39' (o.g.); Makeche 48', 65'; Zahra 58'; Harold 75'	Stadium: Walter Padbury Reserve; Attendance: 1,500; Referee: David Bruce

25 July 2013 South Africa Tour	Mpumalanga Black Aces (South Africa)	1–0	(Australia) Perth Glory	Nelspruit
	69'	Report		Stadium: Mbombela Stadium

28 July 2013 South Africa Tour	University of Pretoria (South Africa)	2–0	(Australia) Perth Glory	Pretoria
	Selolwane (?); Tarumbwa (?)	Report

31 July 2013 South Africa Tour	SuperSport United (South Africa)	2–0	(Australia) Perth Glory	Pretoria
15:00	Khumalo (?); Nkoana (?)	Report		Stadium: Groenkloof Campus

14 August 2013 Friendly	Darul Takzim (Malaysia)	0–2	(Australia) Perth Glory	Johor Bahru
		Report	McGarry 35' (pen.); Makeche 90+3'	Stadium: Larkin Stadium; Attendance: 30,000

21 August 2013 Call To Arms Cup	WA State Team (Western Australia)	1–3	Perth Glory	Perth
	G. Knight 2'	Report	McGarry 50' (pen.); De Silva 82'; Makeche 88'	Stadium: Intiga Stadium; Referee: David Bruce

25 August 2013 Friendly	Cockburn City	0–7	Perth Glory	Perth
Sunday 14:00 AWST		Report	Miličević 1'; Nagai 20', 47'; Sidnei 29', 59'; O'Brien 68', 79'	Stadium: Dalmatinac Park

4 September 2013 Friendly	Stirling Lions	0–4	Perth Glory	Perth
Wednesday 19:00 AWST		Report	Miličević 31'; R. Edwards 35'; Maclaren 71'; Zahra 87'	Stadium: Macedonia Park; Referee: David Bruce

11 September 2013 Friendly	Perth Glory	1–0	Melbourne Heart	Perth
Wednesday 15:30 AWST	Maclaren 9'	Report		Stadium: Intiga Stadium

14 September 2013 Friendly	Perth Glory	1–1	Melbourne Heart	Mandurah
Saturday 15:00 AWST	McGarry 88'	Report	Kewell 84'	Stadium: Hyundai Stadium

18 September 2013 Friendly	Northern All Stars	1–3	Perth Glory	Joondalup
Wednesday 16:00 AWST	Stynes 17' (pen.)	Report	Burns 7'; Maclaren 8', 42'	Stadium: ECU Joondalup Sport Complex; Referee: Adam Fielding

25 September 2013 Friendly	WA State Amateur Team (Western Australia)	1–2	Perth Glory	Perth
Wednesday 19:00 AWST	Kelly 68'	Report	Marulanda 18'; McGarry 21'	Stadium: Percy Doyle Reserve; Referee: Trent Fleskens

29 September 2013 Friendly	Sydney FC	0–3	Perth Glory	Sydney
Sunday 16:00 AEST		Report	Maclaren 15', 89'; Sidnei 48'	Stadium: Jubilee Oval; Referee: Alan Milliner

==== Friendlies ====
10 December 2013	Perth Glory (Australia)	9–0	(Malaysia) FELDA United	Perth
Tuesday 17:00 AWST	Makeche 17', 32', 34'; Maclaren 39'; Sam 64', 86'; J. Burns 70' (pen.); Zahra 73'; O'Neill 84' (pen.)	Report		Stadium: Dorrien Gardens; Referee: David Bruce

==== League table ====
Pos	Team	Pld	W	D	L	GF	GA	GD	Pts	Qualification
1	Brisbane Roar (C)	27	16	4	7	43	25	+18	52	Qualificaition for 2015 AFC Champions League group stage and finals series
2	Western Sydney Wanderers	27	11	9	7	34	29	+5	42	Qualificaition for 2015 AFC Champions League group stage and finals series
3	Central Coast Mariners	27	12	6	9	33	36	−3	42	Qualification for 2015 AFC Champions League qualifying play-off and finals series (Note: Since the winner of 2014 A-League Grand Final (Brisbane Roar) qualified for the 2015 AFC Champions League group stage, the 2nd and 3rd placed teams qualified for the group stage and the qualifying play-off of 2015 AFC Champions League.)
4	Melbourne Victory	27	11	8	8	42	43	−1	41	Qualification for Finals series
5	Sydney FC	27	12	3	12	40	38	+2	39	Qualification for Finals series
6	Adelaide United	27	10	8	9	45	36	+9	38	Qualification for Finals series
7	Newcastle Jets	27	10	6	11	34	34	0	36	
8	Perth Glory	27	7	7	13	28	37	−9	28	
9	Wellington Phoenix (Note: Wellington Phoenix cannot qualify for the AFC Champions League as they are not recognised as an AFC club.)	27	7	7	13	36	51	−15	28	
10	Melbourne Heart	27	6	8	13	36	42	−6	26	

Updated to match(es) played on 13 April 2014. Source: ultimatealeague.com
Rules for classification: 1) points; 2) goal difference; 3) number of goals scored.
(C) Champions

==== Results summary ====
Overall								Home						Away					
Pld	W	D	L	GF	GA	GD	Pts	W	D	L	GF	GA	GD	W	D	L	GF	GA	GD
27	7	7	13	28	36	−8	28	6	4	3	18	11	+7	1	3	10	10	25	−15

Last updated: 13 April 2014.
Source: Competitive Matches

==== Results by round ====
Round	1	2	3	4	5	6	7	8	9	10	11	12	13	14	15	16	17	18	19	20	21	22	23	24	25	26	27
Ground	A	A	H	H	A	H	H	A	H	A	H	A	A	H	H	A	H	A	A	H	A	A	H	A	H	H	A
Result	L	D	W	W	D	D	L	L	W	L	D	L	W	W	D	L	D	L	L	L	L	D	L	L	W	W	L
Position	9	9	6	4	4	4	7	7	7	7	7	8	7	5	6	7	7	8	9	9	10	10	10	10	10	8	8

Updated to match(es) played on 13 April 2014. Source: Matches
A = Away; H = Home; W = Win; D = Draw; L = Loss

==== Matches ====
13 October 2013 1	Adelaide United	3–1	Perth Glory	Coopers Stadium, Adelaide
Sunday 16:30 ACDT	Jerónimo 9', 25'; F. Ferreira 64'; Isaías (yellow card) 40' (red card) 65'; Boogaard (yellow card) 53' (red card) 79'	Report	Nagai 11'	Attendance: 10,320; Referee: Ben Williams

20 October 2013 2	Newcastle Jets	0–0	Perth Glory	Hunter Stadium, Newcastle
Sunday 15:00 AEDT		Report		Attendance: 12,383; Referee: Shaun Evans

27 October 2013 3	Perth Glory	1–0	Melbourne Heart	nib Stadium, Perth
Sunday 14:00 AWST	Maclaren 51'	Report		Attendance: 13,856; Referee: Kris Griffiths-Jones

2 November 2013 4	Perth Glory	1–0	Sydney FC	nib Stadium, Perth
Saturday 14:30 AWST	McGarry 9' (pen.)	Report		Attendance: 10,613; Referee: Ben Williams

9 November 2013 5	Wellington Phoenix	1–1	Perth Glory	AMI Stadium, Christchurch
Saturday 17:00 NZDT	Durante 4'	Report	Nagai 29'	Attendance: 9,671; Referee: Alan Milliner

16 November 2013 6	Perth Glory	1–1	Adelaide United	nib Stadium, Perth
Saturday 14:30 AWST	Harold 69'	Report	Malik 52'	Attendance: 8,574; Referee: Shaun Evans

23 November 2013 7	Perth Glory	1–2	Central Coast Mariners	nib Stadium, Perth
Sunday 18:45 AWST	Maclaren 25'	Report	McGlinchey 35'; Duke 90+3'	Attendance: 8,923; Referee: Adam Kersey

30 November 2013 8	Brisbane Roar	1–0	Perth Glory	Suncorp Stadium, Brisbane
Saturday 16:30 AEST	Berisha 57'	Report		Attendance: 12,308; Referee: Tim McGilchrist

6 December 2013 9	Perth Glory	4–2	Wellington Phoenix	nib Stadium, Perth
Friday 18:45 AWST	Sidnei 16', 90+1'; Thwaite 60'; Zahra 82'	Report	Huysegems 36'; Ifill 49'	Attendance: 8,232; Referee: Matthew Gillett

13 December 2013 10	Melbourne Victory	2–0	Perth Glory	AAMI Park, Melbourne
Friday 19:30 AEDT	Traoré 36'; Finkler 90'	Report		Attendance: 17,008; Referee: Peter Green

21 December 2013 11	Perth Glory	0–0	Adelaide United	nib Stadium, Perth
Saturday 18:30 AWST		Report		Attendance: 9,436; Referee: Alan Milliner

31 December 2013 12	Central Coast Mariners	2–1	Perth Glory	Bluetongue Stadium, Gosford
Tuesday 19:30 AEDT	Sainsbury 11'; McGlinchey 90+6'	Report	McGarry 83' (pen.); J. Burns (yellow card) 89' (red card) 90+4'	Attendance: 12,919; Referee: Shaun Evans

4 January 2014 13	Newcastle Jets	0–1	Perth Glory	Hunter Stadium, Newcastle
Saturday 17:30 AEDT		Report	Harold 38'	Attendance: 11,966; Referee: Matthew Gillett

10 January 2014 14	Perth Glory	3–0	Melbourne Heart	nib Stadium, Perth
Friday 18:45 AWST	Zahra 64'; Smeltz 86', 89'	Report	Macallister (yellow card) 75' (red card) 81'	Attendance: 9,045; Referee: Peter Green

17 January 2014 15	Perth Glory	0–0	Brisbane Roar	nib Stadium, Perth
Friday 18:45 AWST		Report	Berisha (yellow card) 2' (red card) 32'	Attendance: 11,026; Referee: Kris Griffiths-Jones

26 January 2014 16	Western Sydney Wanderers	3–1	Perth Glory	Pirtek Stadium, Parramatta
Sunday 19:00 AEDT	Šantalab 28'; Mooy 35'; Bridge 71' (pen.)	Report	Smeltz 56'	Attendance: 14,111; Referee: Strebre Delovski

31 January 2014 17	Perth Glory	1–1	Melbourne Victory	nib Stadium, Perth
Friday 18:45 AWST	Šernas 50'	Report	Finkler 37' (pen.)	Attendance: 10,151; Referee: Kris Griffiths-Jones

9 February 2014 18	Melbourne Heart	2–1	Perth Glory	Lavington Sports Ground, Albury
Sunday 17:00 AEDT	Kisnorbo 51'; Williams 81'	Report	McGarry 73'	Attendance: 7,218; Referee: Lucien Laverdure

15 February 2014 19	Sydney FC	2–1	Perth Glory	Allianz Stadium, Sydney
Saturday 17:30 AEDT	Despotović 17'; Antonis 64'; Calver (yellow card) 50' (red card) 89'	Report	Ro. Griffiths 67'	Attendance: 11,160; Referee: Chris Beath

22 February 2014 20	Perth Glory	0–2	Western Sydney Wanderers	nib Stadium, Perth
Saturday 18:30 AWST		Report	Poljak 12'; Juric 70'	Attendance: 8,543; Referee: Shaun Evans

28 February 2014 21	Brisbane Roar	3–1	Perth Glory	Suncorp Stadium, Brisbane
Friday 19:00 AEST	Franjić 56'; Miller 80'; Broich 85'	Report	Smeltz 90+1'	Attendance: 10,896; Referee: Ben Williams

9 March 2014 22	Wellington Phoenix	1–1	Perth Glory	Westpac Stadium, Wellington
Sunday 17:00 NZDT	Cunningham 85'	Report	Gallas 34'	Attendance: 6,401; Referee: Jarred Gillett

15 March 2014 23	Perth Glory	1–2	Melbourne Victory	nib Stadium, Perth
Saturday 19:15 AWST	Milligan 27' (o.g.)	Report	Milligan 40' (pen.); A. Thompson 90'	Attendance: 7,068; Referee: Shaun Evans

23 March 2014 24	Western Sydney Wanderers	3–0	Perth Glory	Pirtek Stadium, Parramatta
Sunday 17:00 AEDT	Polenz 42'; Bridge 61'; Juric 78'	Report		Attendance: 12,128; Referee: Tim McGilchrist

29 March 2014 25	Perth Glory	2–1	Newcastle Jets	nib Stadium, Perth
Sunday 18:30 AWST	Marinković 84'; Harold 86'	Report	Taggart 62'	Attendance: 5,837; Referee: Kris Griffiths-Jones

5 April 2014 26	Perth Glory	3–1	Central Coast Mariners	nib Stadium, Perth
Sunday 18:30 AWST	McGarry 8' (pen.); Sidnei 71'; Anderson 86' (o.g.)	Report	Fitzgerald 19' (pen.)	Attendance: 11,127; Referee: Stephen Lucas

13 April 2014 27	Sydney FC	2–1	Perth Glory	Allianz Stadium, Sydney
Sunday 17:00 AEST	Antonis 38'; Garcia 90+3'	Report	Ro. Griffiths 45+1'	Attendance: 15,285; Referee: Lucien Laverdure

==== League Goalscorers per Round ====
Total	Player		Goals per Round																										
Total	Player		1	2	3	4	5	6	7	8	9	10	11	12	13	14	15	16	17	18	19	20	21	22	23	24	25	26	27
4	(New Zealand)	Shane Smeltz														2		1					1						
4	(Scotland)	Steven McGarry				1								1						1								1	
3	(Australia)	Chris Harold						1							1												1		
3	(Brazil)	Sidnei									2																	1	
2	(Japan)	Ryo Nagai	1				1																						
2	(Australia)	Jamie Maclaren			1				1																				
2	(Australia)	Adrian Zahra									1					1													
2	(Australia)	Rostyn Griffiths																			1								1
2	–	Own goal																							1			1	
1	(Australia)	Michael Thwaite									1																		
1	(Lithuania)	Darvydas Šernas																	1										
1	(France)	William Gallas																						1					
1	(Serbia)	Nebojša Marinković																									1		
28	TOTAL		1	0	1	1	1	1	1	0	4	0	0	1	1	3	0	1	1	1	1	0	1	1	1	0	2	3	1

== Awards ==
- Player of the Week (Round 9) – Sidnei Sciola
