= 2012–13 Perth Glory FC season =

Perth Glory FC
2012–13 season
- Chairman: Tony Sage
- Head coach: Ian Ferguson until 11 February 2013; Alistair Edwards interim manager from 11 February 2013
- A-League: 6th
- Finals series: Elimination Finals vs Melbourne Victory
- Top goalscorer: League: Shane Smeltz (7); All: Shane Smeltz (7)
- Highest home attendance: 16,707 vs Adelaide United; 30 March 2013
- Lowest home attendance: 4,821 vs Brisbane Roar; 26 January 2013
- Average home league attendance: 8,876
Home colours	Away colours

The 2012–13 season was Perth Glory's 8th season since the inception of the A-League and 16th since the club's founding, in 1996. It was their third season with Ian Ferguson as head coach (he was replaced by Alistair Edwards in February 2013).

== Home Stadia ==
Due to redevelopment reducing the capacity to 9500, the 2012/2013 A-League season saw the club reclaim Patersons Stadium (formerly Subiaco Oval) as a home stadium in addition to their traditional home at nib Stadium. Perth Glory had not competed at Patersons Stadium since the 2003–04 National Soccer League (NSL) Preliminary Final, where they defeated Adelaide United by five goals. Perth Glory began their campaign against Brisbane Roar at Patersons Stadium, a rematch of the 2012 A-League Grand Final.

== First-team squad ==
Note: Flags indicate national team as defined under FIFA eligibility rules; some limited exceptions apply. Players may hold more than one non-FIFA nationality.

No.	Pos.	Nation	Player
1	GK	AUS	Danny Vukovic
2	DF	AUS	Jack Clisby (Youth)
5	DF	AUS	Steve Pantelidis
6	MF	AUS	Nick Ward
7	MF	AUS	Jacob Burns (Captain)
8	DF	AUS	Dean Heffernan
9	FW	NZL	Shane Smeltz
10	MF	EIR	Liam Miller
11	MF	AUS	Adrian Zahra
12	FW	JPN	Ryo Nagai (On loan from Cerezo Osaka)
13	MF	AUS	Travis Dodd
14	MF	SCO	Steven McGarry
15	MF	AUS	Brandon O'Neill (Youth)

No.	Pos.	Nation	Player
16	DF	AUS	Evan Berger
17	FW	AUS	Chris Harold (Youth)
18	MF	ARG	Matías Córdoba
19	DF	AUS	Joshua Risdon (Youth)
20	GK	AUS	Neil Young
21	DF	AUS	Scott Jamieson
22	FW	AUS	Ndumba Makeche (Youth)
23	DF	AUS	Michael Thwaite (Vice Captain)
24	DF	NZL	Storm Roux
25	MF	LBR	Blamo Quaqua
28	MF	AUS	Daniel De Silva
30	GK	AUS	Lewis Italiano
31	MF	AUS	Andy Higgins

Trialists

- (Australia) Tyson Holmes

=== Contract extensions ===
Squad #	Position	Player	Contract extension	Contract end
5	DF	(Australia) Steve Pantelidis		
35	DF	(Australia) Dean Heffernan		
14	MF	(Scotland) Steven McGarry	One year	May 2013

=== Transfers ===
==== In ====
Squad #	Position	Player	From†	Date	Notes
6	MF	(Australia) Nick Ward	(New Zealand) Wellington Phoenix	27 April 2012	
	FW17	(Australia) Chris Harold	Free agent	30 April 2012	
11	MF	(Australia) Adrian Zahra	Free agent	30 April 2012	
26	MF	(Australia) Brandon O'Neill	(Australia) Perth Glory Youth	1 May 2012	
28	FW	(Australia) Ndumba Makeche	(Australia) Perth Glory Youth	1 May 2012	
21	DF	(Australia) Scott Jamieson	(Australia) Sydney FC	17 May 2012	
23	DF	(Australia) Michael Thwaite	(Australia) Gold Coast United	18 May 2012	
12	FW	(Japan) Ryo Nagai	(Japan) Cerezo Osaka (Loan)	September 2012	
128	MF	(Argentina) Matías Córdoba	(Chile) Deportes La Serena	6 February 2013	

==== Out ====
Squad #	Position	Player	To†	Date	Notes
11	MF	(Netherlands) Victor Sikora	Contract expired	28 February 2012	Retired
22	FW	(Australia) Adam Taggart	(Australia) Newcastle Jets	2 March 2012	
27	MF	(Brazil) Andrezinho	(Cyprus) AEP Paphos	24 April 2012	Released
2	DF	(Australia) Josh Mitchell	(Australia) Newcastle Jets	27 April 2012	Released
6	DF	(Australia) Chris Coyne	Released	27 April 2012	
15	FW	(Australia) Tommy Amphlett	(Australia) Joondalup	27 April 2012	Released
17	MF	(Australia) Todd Howarth	Released	27 April 2012	
12	DF	(Australia) Scott Neville	(Australia) Newcastle Jets	7 May 2012	
4	FW	(Republic of Ireland) Billy Mehmet	(Thailand) Bangkok Glass	4 January 2013	
18	FW	(Australia) Jesse Makarounas	(Australia) Melbourne Victory	18 January 2013	
3	DF	(Netherlands) Bas van den Brink			Released

== Competitions ==
=== Overall ===
Competition	Started round	Current position / round	Final position / round	First match	Last match
A-League	—	—	6th	7 October 2012	30 March 2013
A-League Final series	Elimination Final	Elimination Final	5th	5 April 2013	5 April 2013
National Youth League	—	—	5th	20 October 2012	24 February 2013
W-League	—	—	2nd	21 October 2012	12 January 2013
W-League Final series	Semi-finals	Semi-finals	3rd	20 January 2013	20 January 2013

=== A-League ===
==== Preseason ====
18 July 2012	Perth Glory (Australia)	6–0	(Western Australia) West Australian Amateur Team	Perth
19:00 AWST	Sambind 1'; Makarounas 53', 61'; Zahra 57'; Dodd 66'; O'Neill 86'	Report		Stadium: Intiga Stadium

25 July 2012 South African tour	AmaZulu (South Africa)	1–0	(Australia) Perth Glory	Mbombela Stadium
	Mbhele 37'	Report

28 July 2012 South African tour	Platinum Stars (South Africa)	0–3	(Australia) Perth Glory	Mbombela Stadium
		Report	Dodd 37'; Harold 58'; Holmes 87'

31 July 2012 South African tour	Bidvest Wits (South Africa)	1–2	(Australia) Perth Glory	Mbombela Stadium
	Chapman 41'	Report	Heffernan 14'; Mehmet 29'

22 August 2012	Perth Glory (Australia)	3–0	(Western Australia) WA State Team	Perth
18:45 AWST	Smeltz 9'; Makarounas 17'; Makeche 72'	Report		Stadium: Intiga Stadium; Attendance: ~1,500; Referee: Matthew Cheeseman

25 August 2012	Bayswater City SC (Australia)	0–5	(Australia) Perth Glory	Perth
11:00 AWST		Report	Mehmet 2', 58'; Dodd 18'; McGarry 24'; Zahra 68'	Stadium: Frank Drago Reserve

5 September 2012	Inglewood United (Australia)	0–5	(Australia) Perth Glory	Perth
19:00 AWST		Report	McGarry 33', 35'; Burns 63', 90'; Ward 83'	Stadium: Intiga Stadium

12 September 2012	Perth Glory (Australia)	1–0	(Western Australia) WA State Team	Perth
19:00 AWST	Dodd 2'	Report		Stadium: Intiga Stadium

19 September 2012	Melbourne Victory (Australia)	1–2	(Australia) Perth Glory	Melbourne
14:00 AEST	Flores 36' (pen.)	Report	Ward 10'; Mehmet 37' (pen.)	Stadium: AAMI Park; Referee: Brenton Hayward

22 September 2012	Melbourne Heart (Australia)	0–5	(Australia) Perth Glory	Melbourne
13:30 AEST		Report	Smeltz 10' (pen.), 20'; Burns 42'; Mehmet 65'; Nagai 67'	Stadium: Epping Stadium

==== Results by round ====
Round	1	2	3	4	5	6	7	8	9	10	11	12	13	14	15	16	17	18	19	20	21	22	23	24	25	26	27
Ground	H	A	H	A	H	A	H	H	A	A	H	A	H	A	H	A	H	H	A	A	H	A	H	A	H	A	H
Result	W	L	W	L	W	D	L	D	L	L	W	W	D	L	D	L	L	L	L	L	W	L	W	W	L	W	D
Position	4	6	2	4	3	4	4	5	6	8	5	5	5	5	5	6	8	9	10	10	9	9	9	9	8	7	6

Updated to match(es) played on 24 March 2013. Source: Results
A = Away; H = Home; W = Win; D = Draw; L = Loss

==== Results summary ====
Overall								Home						Away					
Pld	W	D	L	GF	GA	GD	Pts	W	D	L	GF	GA	GD	W	D	L	GF	GA	GD
27	9	5	13	29	31	−2	32	6	4	4	19	14	+5	3	1	9	10	17	−7

==== Results ====
7 October 2012 1	Perth Glory	1–0	Brisbane Roar	Perth
14:00 AWST (UTC+8)	Mehmet 88'	Summary		Stadium: Patersons Stadium; Attendance: 14,385; Referee: Ben Williams

14 October 2012 2	Central Coast Mariners	1–0	Perth Glory	Gosford
15:00 AWST (UTC+8)	McBreen 70'	Summary		Stadium: Bluetongue Stadium; Attendance: 9,192; Referee: Jarred Gillett

21 October 2012 3	Perth Glory	2–0	Melbourne Heart	Perth
14:00 AWST (UTC+8)	Heffernan 39'; Mehmet 86'	Summary		Stadium: nib Stadium; Attendance: 5,548; Referee: Matthew Gillett

28 October 2012 4	Sydney FC	2–1	Perth Glory	Sydney
15:00 AWST (UTC+8)	Del Piero 59' (pen.); Emerton 70'	Summary	Dodd 18'	Stadium: Allianz Stadium; Attendance: 22,128; Referee: Peter Green

3 November 2012 5	Perth Glory	3–2	Newcastle Jets	Perth
18:45 AWST (UTC+8)	McGarry 11'; Ward 38'; Harold 85'	Summary	Tiago 6'; Mitchell 71'	Stadium: nib Stadium; Attendance: 9,293; Referee: Alan Milliner

11 November 2012 6	Adelaide United	1–1	Perth Glory	Adelaide
14:00 AWST (UTC+8)	Vidošić 49'	Summary	Mehmet 43'	Stadium: Hindmarsh Stadium; Attendance: 9,212; Referee: Peter O'Leary

18 November 2012 7	Perth Glory	0–1	Western Sydney Wanderers	Perth
14:00 AWST (UTC+8)		Summary	La Rocca 15'	Stadium: nib Stadium; Attendance: 8,060; Referee: Kris Griffiths-Jones

24 November 2012 8	Perth Glory	1–1	Wellington Phoenix	Perth
18:45 AWST (UTC+8)	Smeltz 62'	Summary	Brockie 73'	Stadium: nib Stadium; Attendance: 7,982; Referee: Strebre Delovski

30 November 2012 9	Melbourne Victory	1–0	Perth Glory	Melbourne
16:30 AWST (UTC+8)	Rojas 58'	Summary		Stadium: AAMI Park; Attendance: 17,676; Referee: Jarred Gillett

8 December 2012 10	Melbourne Heart	1–0	Perth Glory	Melbourne
14:30 AWST (UTC+8)	Mebrahtu 89'	Summary		Stadium: AAMI Park; Attendance: 4,505; Referee: Peter Green

14 December 2012 11	Perth Glory	3–0	Newcastle Jets	Perth
18:45 AWST (UTC+8)	Dodd 45+1', 49'; Smeltz 75' (pen.)	Summary		Stadium: nib Stadium; Attendance: 6,967; Referee: Ben Williams

21 December 2012 12	Brisbane Roar	0–1	Perth Glory	Brisbane
18:00 AWST (UTC+8)		Summary	McGarry 45'	Stadium: Suncorp Stadium; Attendance: 11,352; Referee: Peter Green

27 December 2012 13	Perth Glory	1–1	Western Sydney Wanderers	Perth
18:45 AWST (UTC+8)	Ward 87'	Summary	Haliti 38'	Stadium: Patersons Stadium; Attendance: 9,236; Referee: Ben Williams

31 December 2012 14	Central Coast Mariners	1–0	Perth Glory	Gosford
15:00 AWST (UTC+8)	Ibini-Isei 68'	Summary		Stadium: Bluetongue Stadium; Attendance: 14,591; Referee: Strebre Delovski

5 January 2013 15	Perth Glory	2–2	Sydney FC	Perth
18:45 AWST (UTC+8)	Smeltz 39', 80'	Summary	Culina 63'; Ryall 82'	Stadium: nib Stadium; Attendance: 11,200; Referee: Kris Griffiths-Jones

11 January 2013 16	Adelaide United	3–2	Perth Glory	Adelaide
16:30 AWST (UTC+8)	Neumann 29', 37'; Ramsay 46'	Summary	Smeltz 90' (pen.); McGarry 90+2'	Stadium: Hindmarsh Stadium; Attendance: 10,129; Referee: Peter Green

19 January 2013 17	Perth Glory	0–1	Melbourne Victory	Perth
18:45 AWST (UTC+8)		Summary	Jamieson 24' (o.g.)	Stadium: nib Stadium; Attendance: 7,603; Referee: Regis Queffelec

26 January 2013 18	Perth Glory	0–1	Brisbane Roar	Perth
17:00 AWST (UTC+8)		Summary	James Meyer 16'	Stadium: nib Stadium; Attendance: 4,821; Referee: Alan Milliner

2 February 2013 19	Wellington Phoenix	1–0	Perth Glory	Auckland
12:00 AWST (UTC+8)	Brockie 42'	Summary		Stadium: Eden Park; Attendance: 11,566; Referee: Adam Kersey

9 February 2013 20	Melbourne Heart	2–0	Perth Glory	Melbourne
14:30 AWST (UTC+8)	Kalmar 23'; Babalj 56'	Summary		Stadium: AAMI Park; Attendance: 6,096; Referee: Alan Milliner

16 February 2013 21	Perth Glory	2–1	Central Coast Mariners	Perth
18:45 AWST (UTC+8)	Dodd 27'; Smeltz 65'	Summary	Ibini-Isei 13'	Stadium: nib Stadium; Attendance: 5,909; Referee: Jarred Gillett

23 February 2013 22	Western Sydney Wanderers	1–0	Perth Glory	Sydney
14:30 AWST (UTC+8)	Mooy 58'	Summary		Stadium: Parramatta Stadium; Attendance: 11,772; Referee: Ben Williams

2 March 2013 23	Perth Glory	2–1	Sydney FC	Perth
18:45 AWST (UTC+8)	Harold 20'; Smeltz 35'	Summary	Del Piero 29'	Stadium: nib Stadium; Attendance: 8,378; Referee: Strebre Delovski

8 March 2013 24	Newcastle Jets	1–2	Perth Glory	Newcastle
16:30 AWST (UTC+8)	Taggart 45'	Summary	Córdoba 24'; Thwaite 90'	Stadium: Hunter Stadium; Attendance: 10,807; Referee: Adam Kersey

17 March 2013 25	Perth Glory	1–2	Wellington Phoenix	Perth
16:00 AWST (UTC+8)	Nagai 76'	Summary	Ifill 35'; Huysegems 67'	Stadium: nib Stadium; Attendance: 6,360; Referee: Tim McGilchrist

23 March 2013 26	Melbourne Victory	2–3	Perth Glory	Melbourne
14:30 AWST (UTC+8)	Leijer 13'; Cristaldo 89'	Summary	Harold 21'; Dodd 38'; Risdon 90+4'	Stadium: AAMI Park; Attendance: 16,839; Referee: Peter O'Leary

30 March 2013 27	Perth Glory	1–1	Adelaide United	Perth
18:45 AWST (UTC+8)	Zahra 58'	Summary	Barker-Daish 90'	Stadium: nib Stadium; Attendance: 16,707; Referee: Kris Griffiths-Jones

==== Finals series ====
5 April 2013 Elimination Final	Melbourne Victory	2–1 (a.e.t.)	Perth Glory	Melbourne
17:30 AWST (UTC+8)	Milligan 90+1' (pen.); Thompson 95'	Summary	Nagai 15'	Stadium: Etihad Stadium; Attendance: 22,902; Referee: Jarred Gillett

==== League table ====
Pos	Team	Pld	W	D	L	GF	GA	GD	Pts	Qualification
1	Western Sydney Wanderers	27	18	3	6	41	21	+20	57	Qualification for 2014 AFC Champions League group stage and finals series
2	Central Coast Mariners (C)	27	16	6	5	48	22	+26	54	Qualification for 2014 AFC Champions League group stage and finals series
3	Melbourne Victory	27	13	5	9	48	45	+3	44	Qualification for 2014 AFC Champions League qualifying play-off and finals series (Note: Since the winner of 2013 A-League Grand Final (Central Coast Mariners) qualified for the 2014 AFC Champions League group stage, the 3rd placed team qualified for the qualifying play-off of 2014 AFC Champions League.)
4	Adelaide United	27	12	5	10	38	37	+1	41	Qualification for Finals series
5	Brisbane Roar	27	10	5	12	33	29	+4	35	Qualification for Finals series
6	Perth Glory	27	9	5	13	29	31	−2	32	Qualification for Finals series
7	Sydney FC	27	9	5	13	41	51	−10	32	
8	Newcastle Jets	27	8	7	12	30	45	−15	31	
9	Melbourne Heart	27	8	3	16	31	40	−9	27	
10	Wellington Phoenix (Note: Wellington Phoenix cannot qualify for the AFC Champions League as they are not recognised as an AFC club.)	27	7	6	14	31	49	−18	27	

Updated to match(es) played on 30 March 2013. Source: ultimatealeague.com
Rules for classification: 1) points; 2) goal difference; 3) number of goals scored.
(C) Champions

=== National Youth League ===
==== Regular season ====
20 October 2012 1	Perth Glory Youth	1–2	Brisbane Roar Youth	Perth
13:00	Donachie 10' (o.g.)	Report	Lambadaridis 72'; Do 83'	Stadium: Intiga Stadium

28 October 2012 2	Sydney FC Youth	2–4	Perth Glory Youth	Sydney
14:15	Urosevski 17'; Triantis 51'	Report	Zahra 21'; O'Neill 27'; M. Davies 36'; O'Brien 79'	Stadium: ANZ Stadium

4 November 2012 3	Perth Glory Youth	2–3	Newcastle Jets Youth	Perth
15:00	Nagai 30'; Makarounas 90+3'	Report	Bradbery 10' (pen.), 88'; Pavicevic 90'	Stadium: Intiga Stadium

10 November 2012 4	Melbourne Heart Youth	1–4	Perth Glory Youth	Melbourne
15:00	Groenewald 33'	Report	Makeche 17', 90+2' (pen.); O'Brien 74'; Zahra 90'	Stadium: John Cain Memorial Park

17 November 2012 5	Perth Glory Youth	0–1	Central Coast Mariners Youth	Perth
10:30		Report	Dixon 48'	Stadium: Intiga Stadium

25 November 2012 6	Perth Glory Youth	0–3	Melbourne Victory Youth	Perth
15:00		Report	Buceto 42', 50'; L. Jeggo 66'	Stadium: Intiga Stadium

2 December 2012 7	AIS Football Program	1–2	Perth Glory Youth	Canberra
11:00	Gersbach 25'	Report	Makeche 6'; Kalau 29'	Stadium: AIS Athletics Track

8 December 2012 8	Adelaide United Youth	6–2	Perth Glory Youth	Adelaide
11:00	Mabil 8' van Dijk 20', 55'; Wooding 35'; Melling 45'; Briscoe 85'	Report	Makeche 1', 70'	Stadium: Burton Park

15 December 2012 9	Perth Glory Youth	5–1	Western Sydney Wanderers Youth	Perth
10:30	Nagai 4'; Makarounas 43'; Makeche 45+4'; O'Neill 46'; Kalau 74'	Report	Barac 78'	Stadium: Intiga Stadium

23 December 2012 10	Brisbane Roar Youth	2–2	Perth Glory Youth	Brisbane
15:00	Proia 2'; Liftin 48'	Report	O'Neill 22'; Lowry 35'	Stadium: Goodwin Park

6 January 2013 11	Perth Glory Youth	1–2	AIS Football Program	Perth
11:00	Higgins 70'	Report	Schmidt 81'; Barresi 82'	Stadium: Intiga Stadium

13 January 2013 12	Newcastle Jets Youth	4–6	Perth Glory Youth	Newcastle
10:30	Ribeiro 13'; Jesic 32', 35', 88' (pen.)	Report	Harold 10' (pen.); Clisby 50'; Sam 61'; Woodcock 68'; Zahra 78'; Kalau 80'	Stadium: Wanderers Oval; Referee: Stephan Luca

20 January 2013 13	Perth Glory Youth	5–2	Adelaide United Youth	Perth
17:00	Harold 12'; Nagai 48'; Woodcock 51'; Sam 84'; Makeche 90'	Report	Melling 66'; Kirk 82'	Stadium: Intiga Stadium

27 January 2013 14	Perth Glory Youth	3–4	Sydney FC Youth	Perth
17:00	O'Brien 27'; Makeche 34'; O'Neill 78'	Report	Gligor 16'; Petkovski 37', 63'; Taneski 54'	Stadium: Intiga Stadium

3 February 2013 15	Melbourne Victory Youth	7–0	Perth Glory Youth	Melbourne
15:00	S. Gallagher 15', 55'; Nabbout 20'; Stella 77', 79', 90'; Buceto 90+4'	Report		Stadium: SS Anderson Reserve

9 February 2013 16	Central Coast Mariners Youth	1–3	Perth Glory Youth	Tuggerah
10:30	McDonald 70'	Report	Vulin 5'; Zahra 54'; Makeche 84'	Stadium: Central Coast Mariners Centre of Excellence

17 February 2013 17	Perth Glory Youth	4–1	Melbourne Heart Youth	Perth
17:00	Córdoba 28'; Zahra 50'; Sam 78'; Vulin 82'	Report	Mullett 89'	Stadium: Intiga Stadium

24 February 2013 18	Western Sydney Wanderers Youth	2–1	Perth Glory Youth	Sydney
10:00	Haliti 42'; McGing 90+3'	Report	Vulin 81'	Stadium: Cook Park

==== League table ====
Pos	Team	Pld	W	D	L	GF	GA	GD	Pts
1	Melbourne Victory Youth (C)	18	12	1	5	57	20	+37	37
2	Central Coast Mariners Academy	18	12	1	5	38	28	+10	37
3	Newcastle Jets Youth	18	10	1	7	54	36	+18	31
4	Brisbane Roar Youth	18	9	3	6	39	34	+5	30
5	Perth Glory Youth	18	8	1	9	45	45	0	25
6	Melbourne Heart Youth	18	8	1	9	32	34	−2	25
7	Western Sydney Wanderers Youth	18	7	4	7	29	41	−12	25
8	Adelaide United Youth	18	6	4	8	35	42	−7	22
9	Sydney FC Youth	18	6	3	9	41	46	−5	21
10	AIS Football Program	18	2	1	15	23	58	−35	7

Source: au.soccerway.com
Rules for classification: 1) points; 2) goal difference; 3) number of goals scored.
(C) Champions

==== Results summary ====
Overall								Home						Away					
Pld	W	D	L	GF	GA	GD	Pts	W	D	L	GF	GA	GD	W	D	L	GF	GA	GD
18	8	1	9	45	45	0	25	3	0	6	21	19	+2	5	1	3	24	26	−2

==== League Goalscorers by round ====
Total	Player		Goals per Game																	
Total	Player		1	2	3	4	5	6	7	8	9	10	11	12	13	14	15	16	17	18
9	(Australia)	Ndumba Makeche				2			1	2	1				1	1		1		
5	(Australia)	Adrian Zahra		1		1								1				1	1	
4	(Australia)	Brandon O'Neill		1							1	1				1				
3	(Australia)	Moses Kalau							1		1			1						
3	(Japan)	Ryo Nagai			1						1				1					
3	(Australia)	Harry O'Brien		1		1										1				
3	(Australia)	Borbor Sam												1	1				1	
3	(Australia)	Slobodan Vulin																1	1	1
2	(Australia)	Jesse Makarounas			1						1									
2	(Australia)	Chris Harold												1	1					
2	(Australia)	Riley Woodcock												1	1					
1	(Australia)	Matthew Davies		1																
1	(Australia)	Ryan Lowry										1								
1	(Australia)	Andy Higgins											1							
1	(Australia)	Jack Clisby												1						
1	(Argentina)	Matías Córdoba																	1	
1	–	Own goal	1																	
45	Total		1	4	2	4			2	2	5	2	1	6	5	3		3	4	1

=== W-League ===
==== Regular season ====
21 October 2012 1	Perth Glory	2–0	Melbourne Victory	Perth
10:30	Gill 75'; Tabain 88'	Report		Stadium: Intiga Stadium; Referee: Kirralee Gardner

27 October 2012 2	Perth Glory	2–1	Adelaide United	Perth
15:00	Gill 45+2'; D'Ovidio 88'	Report	Mayo 44'	Stadium: Intiga Stadium; Referee: Renee Silvester

3 November 2012 3	Western Sydney Wanderers	2–0	Perth Glory	Sydney
14:00	Camilleri 43', 61'	Report		Stadium: Campbelltown Stadium; Referee: Alison Logue

10 November 2012 4	Newcastle Jets	1–6	Perth Glory	Newcastle
16:30	Huster 73'	Report	De Vanna 4'; McCallum 19'; Gill 58', 62', 90+2' (pen.); Tabain 68'	Stadium: Wanderers Oval; Referee: Peta McCallum

17 November 2012 5	Perth Glory	3–1	Sydney FC	Perth
11:00	R. Sutton 18', 76', 85'	Report	Logarzo 19'	Stadium: nib Stadium; Referee: Rebecca Durcau

5 December 2012 6	Canberra United	2–1	Perth Glory	Canberra
18:00	Munoz 5' (pen.); Washington 53'	Report	R. Sutton 9'	Stadium: Deakin Stadium; Referee: Peta McCallum

1 December 2012 7	Perth Glory	3–0	Western Sydney Wanderers	Perth
16:00	Tabain 17'; Gill 25'; McCallum 59'	Report		Stadium: Intiga Stadium; Referee: Renee Silvester

8 December 2012 8	Brisbane Roar	2–2	Perth Glory	Brisbane
10:00	T. Butt 61'; Gorry 87'	Report	Gill 34'; Tabain 44'	Stadium: QSAC; Referee: Kirralee Gardner

15 December 2012 9	Sydney FC	5–7	Perth Glory	Sydney
17:00	K. Simon 41'; Kete 43'; Billson 62'; Foord 81'; Kerr 90+2'	Report	De Vanna 13', 72', 87'; Luik 56'; D'Ovidio 60', 61'; Gill 87'	Stadium: Allianz Stadium; Referee: Kirralee Gardner

22 December 2012 10	Perth Glory	3–3	Canberra United	Perth
16:00	Luik 33'; Milne 35'; De Vanna 49'	Report	Washington 24'; Raso 44'; C. Cooper 71'	Stadium: Intiga Stadium; Referee: Kate Jacewicz

5 January 2013 11	Perth Glory	2–2	Newcastle Jets	Perth
16:00	R. Sutton 22'; Gill 56'	Report	van Egmond 3'; Courtenay 77'	Stadium: Intiga Stadium; Attendance: 736; Referee: Catherine Hoffman

12 January 2013 12	Adelaide United	1–3	Perth Glory	Adelaide
10:00	Quigley 52'	Report	Gill 18', 65'; Tabain 86'	Stadium: Burton Park; Referee: Kelly Jones

==== Finals series ====
20 January 2013 Semi Final	Perth Glory	1–1 (a.e.t.) (3–4 p)	Melbourne Victory	Perth
13:00	McCallum 56' (f.k.)	Report	L. Špiranović 51'	Stadium: nib Stadium; Attendance: 1,589; Referee: Katie Patterson
	Penalties
	McCallum (penalty scored); Gill (penalty scored); Luik (penalty missed); R. Sutton (penalty missed); De Vanna (penalty scored)		(penalty scored) Johnson; (penalty missed) Friend; (penalty scored) P. Larsson; (penalty scored) Koca; (penalty scored) McDonald

==== Results summary ====
Overall								Home						Away					
Pld	W	D	L	GF	GA	GD	Pts	W	D	L	GF	GA	GD	W	D	L	GF	GA	GD
12	7	3	2	34	20	+14	24	4	2	0	15	7	+8	3	1	2	19	13	+6

==== League table ====
Pos	Team	Pld	W	D	L	GF	GA	GD	Pts	Qualification
1	Brisbane Roar	12	8	2	2	28	15	+13	26	Qualification to Finals series
2	Perth Glory	12	7	3	2	34	20	+14	24	Qualification to Finals series
3	Melbourne Victory	12	7	2	3	26	14	+12	23	Qualification to Finals series
4	Sydney FC (C)	12	6	2	4	30	24	+6	20	Qualification to Finals series
5	Canberra United	12	5	3	4	25	20	+5	18	
6	Western Sydney Wanderers	12	4	1	7	19	23	−4	13	
7	Newcastle Jets	12	1	3	8	15	33	−18	6	
8	Adelaide United	12	2	0	10	12	40	−28	6	

Source: au.soccerway.com
Rules for classification: 1) points; 2) goal difference; 3) number of goals scored.
(C) Champions

==== League goalscorers by round ====
Total	Player		Goals per Game												
Total	Player		1	2	3	4	5	6	7	8	9	10	11	12	SF
11	(Australia)	Kate Gill	1	1		3			1	1	1		1	2	
5	(Australia)	Lisa De Vanna				1					3	1			
5	(Australia)	Rosie Sutton					3	1					1		
5	(Australia)	Marianna Tabain	1			1			1	1				1	
3	(Australia)	Elisa D'Ovidio		1							2				
3	(Australia)	Collette McCallum				1			1						1
2	(Australia)	Aivi Luik									1	1			
1	(New Zealand)	Elizabeth Milne										1			

== Squad statistics ==
=== Appearances and goals ===
As of 5 April 2013

No.	Pos	Nat	Player	Total		A League		Finals	
No.	Pos	Nat	Player	Apps	Goals	Apps	Goals	Apps	Goals
1	GK	(Australia) AUS	Danny Vukovic	28	0	27+0	0	1+0	0
2	DF	(Australia) AUS	Jack Clisby	3	0	1+2	0	0+0	0
5	DF	(Australia) AUS	Steve Pantelidis	19	0	15+3	0	1+0	0
6	MF	(Australia) AUS	Nick Ward	23	2	9+14	2	0+0	0
7	MF	(Australia) AUS	Jacob Burns	17	0	15+1	0	1+0	0
8	DF	(Australia) AUS	Dean Heffernan	23	1	21+1	1	0+1	0
9	FW	(New Zealand) NZL	Shane Smeltz	18	7	16+1	7	1+0	0
10	MF	(Republic of Ireland) IRL	Liam Miller	24	0	23+0	0	1+0	0
11	MF	(Australia) AUS	Adrian Zahra	8	1	4+3	1	1+0	0
12	FW	(Japan) JPN	Ryo Nagai	18	2	13+4	1	1+0	1
13	MF	(Australia) AUS	Travis Dodd	24	4	22+2	4	0+0	0
14	MF	(Scotland) SCO	Steven McGarry	27	3	26+0	3	0+1	0
15	MF	(Australia) AUS	Brandon O'Neill	2	0	0+2	0	0+0	0
16	DF	(Australia) AUS	Evan Berger	6	0	2+4	0	0+0	0
17	FW	(Australia) AUS	Chris Harold	22	3	11+11	3	0+0	0
18	MF	(Argentina) ARG	Matías Córdoba	7	1	5+1	1	1+0	0
19	DF	(Australia) AUS	Joshua Risdon	26	1	25+0	1	1+0	0
21	DF	(Australia) AUS	Scott Jamieson	23	0	21+1	0	1+0	0
22	FW	(Australia) AUS	Ndumba Makeche	1	0	0+1	0	0+0	0
23	DF	(Australia) AUS	Michael Thwaite	21	1	20+0	1	1+0	0
28	MF	(Australia) AUS	Daniel De Silva	4	0	0+3	0	0+1	0
31	MF	(Australia) AUS	Andy Higgins	3	0	0+2	0	0+1	0
Players who appeared for Perth Glory no longer at the club:
3	DF	(Netherlands) NED	Bas van den Brink	13	0	12+1	0	0+0	0
4	FW	(Republic of Ireland) IRL	Billy Mehmet	13	3	9+4	3	0+0	0
18	FW	(Australia) AUS	Jesse Makarounas	3	0	0+3	0	0+0	0

=== Goal scorers ===
Rank	Player		Goals per Game																																
Rank	Player		1	2	3	4	5	6	7	8	9	10	11	12	13	14	15	16	17	18	19	20	21	22	23	24	25	26	27	Total	EF	SF	Grand Final	Total	Total
1	(New Zealand)	Shane Smeltz								1			1				2	1					1		1					7					7
2	(Australia)	Travis Dodd				1							2										1					1		5					5
3	(Republic of Ireland)	Billy Mehmet	1		1			1																						3					3
3	(Scotland)	Steven McGarry					1							1				1												3					3
3	(Australia)	Chris Harold					1																		1			1		3					3
6	(Australia)	Nick Ward					1								1															2					2
6	(Japan)	Ryo Nagai																									1			1	1			1	2
8	(Australia)	Dean Heffernan			1																									1					1
8	(Argentina)	Matías Córdoba																								1				1					1
8	(Australia)	Michael Thwaite																								1				1					1
8	(Australia)	Joshua Risdon																										1		1					1
8	(Australia)	Adrian Zahra																											1	1					1

1 goal was scored from a penalty kick 2 goals were scored from penalty kicks

=== Disciplinary record ===
No.	Position	Name	A League			Finals			Total		
No.	Position	Name	Yellow card	Yellow card Yellow card Red card	Red card	Yellow card	Yellow card Yellow card Red card	Red card	Yellow card	Yellow card Yellow card Red card	Red card
1	GK	(Australia) Danny Vukovic	3	0	0	0	0	0	3	0	0
3	DF	(Netherlands) Bas van den Brink	3	0	0	–	–	–	3	0	0
4	FW	(Republic of Ireland) Billy Mehmet	3	0	0	–	–	–	3	0	0
5	DF	(Australia) Steve Pantelidis	2	0	1	2	1	0	4	1	1
6	MF	(Australia) Nick Ward	4	0	0	0	0	0	4	0	0
7	MF	(Australia) Jacob Burns	7	0	0	0	0	0	7	0	0
8	DF	(Australia) Dean Heffernan	4	0	0	0	0	0	4	0	0
9	FW	(New Zealand) Shane Smeltz	1	0	0	0	0	0	1	0	0
10	MF	(Republic of Ireland) Liam Miller	8	0	0	0	0	0	8	0	0
12	FW	(Japan) Ryo Nagai	1	0	0	0	0	0	1	0	0
13	MF	(Australia) Travis Dodd	1	0	0	0	0	0	1	0	0
14	MF	(Scotland) Steven McGarry	3	0	0	0	0	0	3	0	0
17	FW	(Australia) Chris Harold	2	0	0	0	0	0	2	0	0
19	DF	(Australia) Joshua Risdon	5	1	0	0	0	0	5	1	0
21	DF	(Australia) Scott Jamieson	5	0	0	1	0	0	6	0	0
23	DF	(Australia) Michael Thwaite	4	0	0	0	0	0	4	0	0
31	MF	(Australia) Andy Higgins	1	0	0	0	0	0	1	0	0
