= Jesse Makarounas =

Australian soccer player

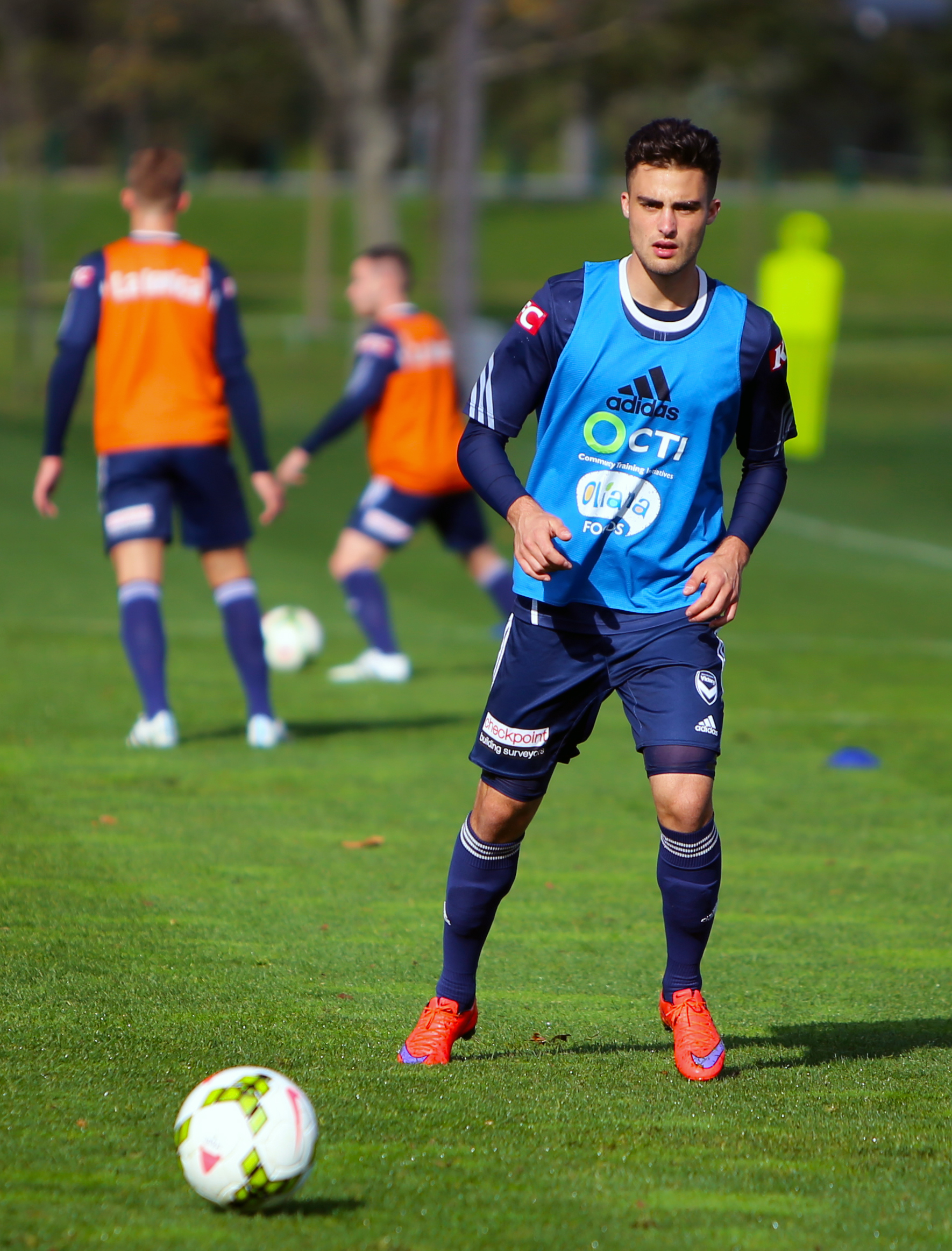
- Makarounas with Melbourne Victory in 2015.

Personal information
- Full name: Jesse David Makarounas
- Date of birth: 18 April 1994 (age 32)
- Place of birth: Darwin, Australia
- Height: 1.79 m (5 ft 10 in)
- Position: Attacking midfielder

Team information
- Current team: Brunswick City

Youth career
- Wanneroo City
- Sorrento SC
- Inglewood United
- WA NTC
- 2010–2011: AIS Football Program

Senior career*
| Years | Team | Apps | (Gls) |
| 2011–2013 | Perth Glory | 4 | (0) |
| 2013–2016 | Melbourne Victory | 36 | (0) |
| 2016–2017 | Adelaide United | 10 | (1) |
| 2018–2019 | Moreland City | 43 | (19) |
| 2020–2025 | Brunswick City | 49 | (22) |
| 2025– | Bayside Argonauts | 15 | (3) |

International career^{‡}
| 2010–2011 | Australia U17 | 19 | (11) |
| 2011–2014 | Australia U20 | 9 | (4) |
- * Club domestic league appearances and goals as of 14 April 2026 ‡ National team caps and goals as of 13 May 2015

Jesse David Makarounas (born 18 April 1994) is an Australian professional football (soccer) player who plays as a midfielder for Bayside Argonauts in VPL Men 2.

== Early life ==
Born in Darwin, Makarounas played youth football at the WA NTC and AIS Football Program before making his professional debut for Perth Glory in 2012. In 2013, he moved to Melbourne Victory, where he played until 2016.

Makarounas made numerous appearances for the Australia under-17 and Australia under-20 sides.

== Club career ==
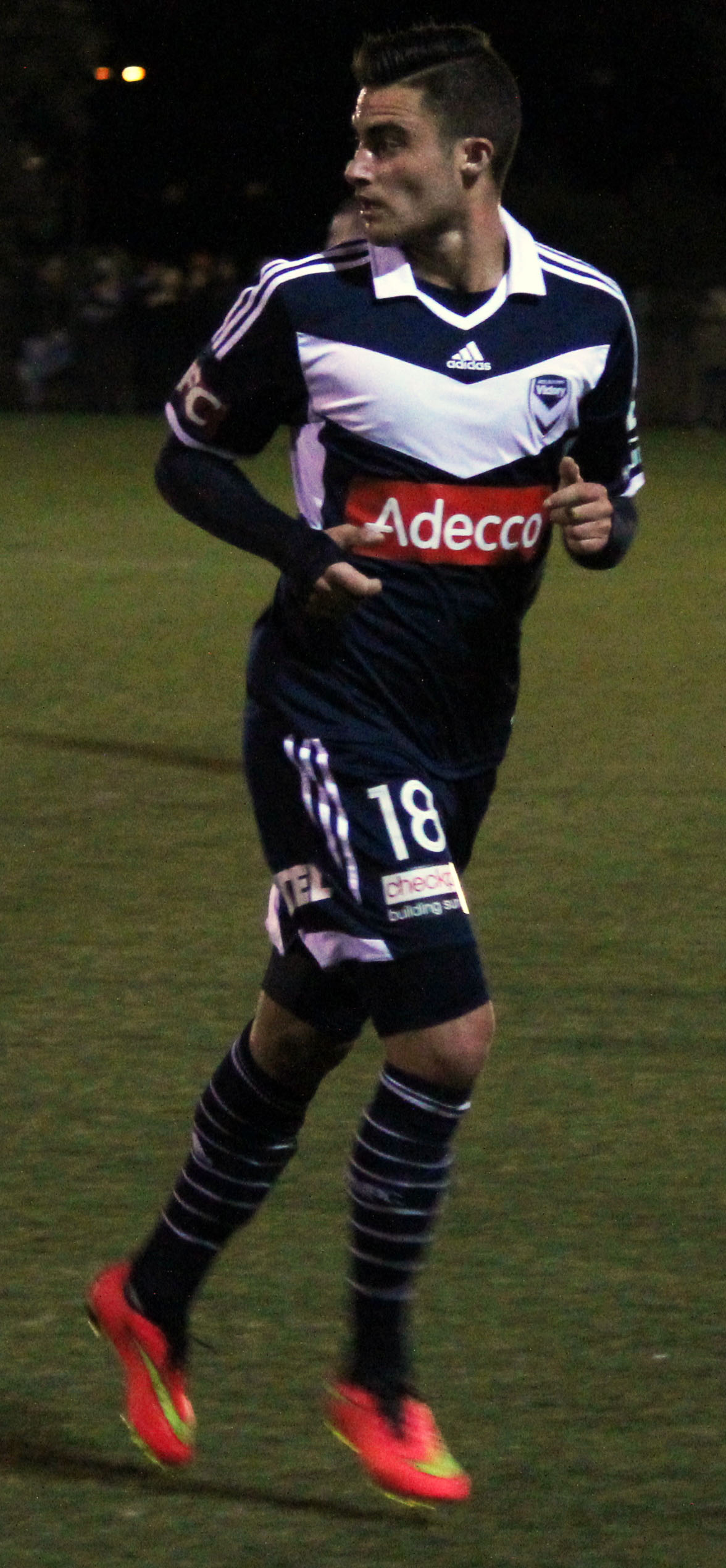
Makarounas in 2014

=== Perth Glory ===
On 29 April 2011, Makarounas signed for Perth Glory having previously played for the Australian Institute of Sport in the National Youth League. Jesse made his professional debut, and debut for Perth Glory on 24 March 2012, coming on as a half-time substitute for Steven McGarry, in 4–2 home win against Melbourne Victory.

=== Melbourne Victory ===
In January 2013 Makarounas signed with rival club Melbourne Victory.

Makarounas was released by Melbourne Victory on 28 May 2016.

=== Adelaide United ===
On 11 July 2016, Adelaide United announced that they had signed Makarounas on a one-year contract. Makarounas scored his first A-League goal in Adelaide's first game of the 2016–17 A-League, capitalising on a defensive error to score the equaliser in a draw with Newcastle Jets. However, by the end of 2016, Makarounas had lost his position in the Adelaide side, featuring only once between December 2016 and March 2017. Makarounas departed Adelaide at the end of the 2016–17 season.

=== Moreland City ===
Makarounas joined Moreland City on 13 February 2018 alongside Christopher Cristaldo & Alex Wilkinson, hours before the transfer deadline. Jesse Makarounas' skill and temperament was clearly evident in every game.

== Career statistics ==
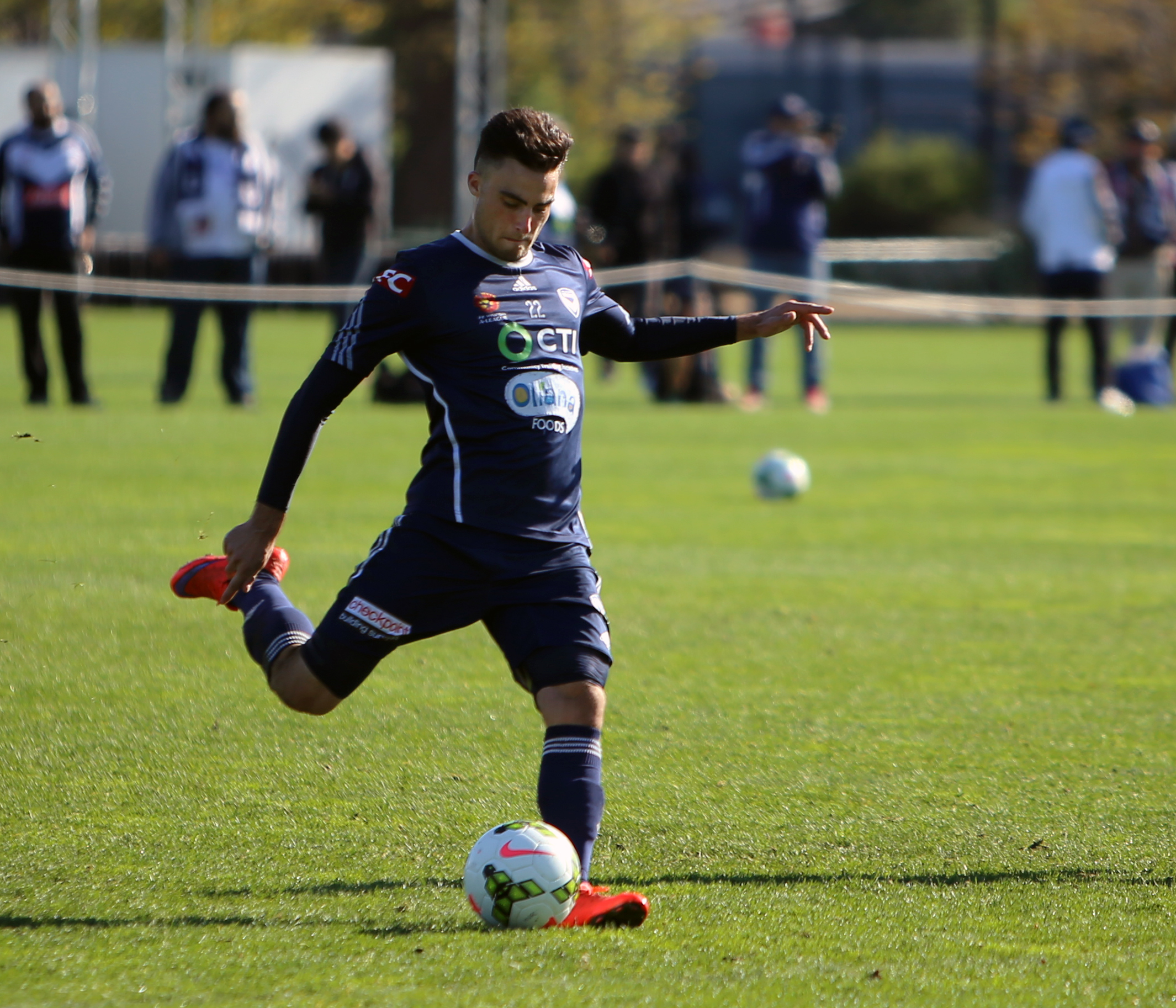
Makarounas in 2015

As of 11 May 2017

| Club | Season | League | | Cup | | Asia | | Total | |
| Club | Season | Apps | Goals | Apps | Goals | Apps | Goals | Apps | Goals |
|---|---|---|---|---|---|---|---|---|---|
| Perth Glory | 2011–12 | 1 | 0 | 0 | 0 | 0 | 0 | 1 | 0 |
| Perth Glory | 2012–13 | 3 | 0 | 0 | 0 | 0 | 0 | 3 | 0 |
| Perth Glory | Total | 4 | 0 | 0 | 0 | 0 | 0 | 4 | 0 |
| Melbourne Victory | 2012–13 | 3 | 0 | 0 | 0 | 0 | 0 | 3 | 0 |
| Melbourne Victory | 2013–14 | 9 | 0 | 0 | 0 | 5 | 0 | 14 | 0 |
| Melbourne Victory | 2014–15 | 9 | 0 | 2 | 0 | 0 | 0 | 11 | 0 |
| Melbourne Victory | 2015–16 | 15 | 0 | 3 | 2 | 8 | 1 | 26 | 3 |
| Melbourne Victory | Total | 36 | 0 | 5 | 2 | 13 | 1 | 54 | 3 |
| Adelaide United | 2016–17 | 10 | 1 | 1 | 0 | 2 | 0 | 13 | 1 |
| Career total | | 50 | 1 | 6 | 2 | 15 | 1 | 66 | 4 |

== Honours ==
=== Club ===
Melbourne Victory

- A-League Premiership: 2014–15
- FFA Cup: 2015
