= Ryo Nagai =

Japanese footballer

Ryo Nagai 永井 龍
Personal information
- Full name: Ryo Nagai
- Date of birth: 23 May 1991 (age 35)
- Place of birth: Nishinomiya, Hyōgo, Japan
- Height: 1.80 m (5 ft 11 in)
- Position: Forward

Team information
- Current team: Giravanz Kitakyushu
- Number: 10

Youth career
- 2004–2009: Cerezo Osaka

Senior career*
| Years | Team | Apps | (Gls) |
| 2010–2015 | Cerezo Osaka | 47 | (3) |
| 2012–2014 | → Perth Glory (loan) | 26 | (3) |
| 2015 | → Oita Trinita (loan) | 9 | (2) |
| 2016 | V-Varen Nagasaki | 41 | (17) |
| 2017 | Nagoya Grampus | 24 | (6) |
| 2018–2019 | Matsumoto Yamaga | 51 | (6) |
| 2020–2022 | Sanfrecce Hiroshima | 26 | (1) |
| 2022 | → Fagiano Okayama (loan) | 12 | (1) |
| 2022–2023 | Fagiano Okayama | 0 | (0) |
| 2023 | Sanfrecce Hiroshima (Loan) | 34 | (3) |
| 2023-2024 | Fagiano Okayama | 2 | (1) |
| 2024- | Giravanz Kitakyushu | 73 | (21) |
- * Club domestic league appearances and goals as of 24 August 2026

Ryo Nagai (永井 龍, Nagai Ryo; born 23 May 1991) is a Japanese football player who can play as a forward, currently playing for J3 League club Giravanz Kitakyushu.

== Club career ==
=== Cerezo Osaka ===
During the 2011/12 season, Nagai made his AFC Champions League debut as a 74th-minute substitute for Cerezo Osaka against Chinese club Shandong Luneng on 10 May 2011. Cerezo Osaka won the group G match 4–0 at the Nagai Stadium, Osaka, Japan.

=== Perth Glory ===
On 28 September 2012 it was announced that Nagai had signed with Perth Glory for a season long loan deal. He played his first game for Perth Glory coming off the bench in the team's 1–0 loss to the Central Coast Mariners.

During his first season with the Glory, Ryo found it hard to break into the starting team under then coach Ian Ferguson. His playing time was greatly restricted until Ferguson stood down in February and Perth Glory appointed Alistair Edwards as his replacement. Under Edwards, Nagai flourished and his performances improved with each game played and Nagai contributed to Glory's surprise push for the A-League finals.

On 5 July 2013 it was announced that Perth Glory and Cerezo Osaka had finally agreed to a new loan deal for Ryo to spend the 2013/14 A-League season with the Western Australian club. Upon the announcement of the signing, Perth Glory head coach, Alistair Edwards, told the media that Ryo had become one of the family and highlighted his versatility in attack as one of the major reasons Glory were keen to secure his signature for a second time.

On 11 January 2014 Perth Glory and Nagai parted company with the Western Australian club terminating the speedy winger's loan contract. Nagai was unable to participate in the remainder of the A-League season after suffering a serious hamstring tear in Perth's round 11 0–0 draw with Adelaide United. It was mutually agreed that Nagai would be best served in his recovery by returning to Japan to parent club Cerezo Osaka. Perth Glory CEO, Jason Brewer, praised Nagai for being a fantastic player, citing Ryo's attacking flair on his departure from the club as the main reason why in just two years Nagai had become a firm fan favourite. Nagai responded to his departure from the club in an equally positive fashion, stating "I have met some great people here and I will take all the positive experiences I have learnt at Perth back to Japan with me".

On 26 December 2016, Nagai signed for Nagoya Grampus.

== International career ==
Ryo Nagai has previously represented and captained Japan at U-19 level.

== Career statistics ==
=== Club ===
As of match played 4 July 2022.

Appearances and goals by club, season and competition
| Club | Season | League | | | National Cup | | League Cup | | Continental | | Other | | Total | |
| Club | Season | Division | Apps | Goals | Apps | Goals | Apps | Goals | Apps | Goals | Apps | Goals | Apps | Goals |
|---|---|---|---|---|---|---|---|---|---|---|---|---|---|---|
| Cerezo Osaka | 2010 | J1 League | 7 | 0 | 2 | 2 | 0 | 0 | - | | - | | 9 | 2 |
| Cerezo Osaka | 2011 | J1 League | 10 | 0 | 0 | 0 | 0 | 0 | 1 | 0 | - | | 11 | 0 |
| Cerezo Osaka | 2012 | J1 League | 8 | 0 | 0 | 0 | 5 | 0 | - | | - | | 13 | 0 |
| Cerezo Osaka | 2013 | J1 League | 0 | 0 | 0 | 0 | 0 | 0 | - | | - | | 0 | 0 |
| Cerezo Osaka | 2014 | J1 League | 21 | 3 | 2 | 0 | 2 | 1 | - | | - | | 25 | 4 |
| Cerezo Osaka | 2015 | J2 League | 1 | 0 | 0 | 0 | 0 | 0 | - | | - | | 1 | 0 |
| Perth Glory (loan) | 2012–13 | A-League | 17 | 1 | - | | - | | - | | 1 | 1 | 18 | 2 |
| Perth Glory (loan) | 2013–14 | A-League | 9 | 2 | - | | - | | - | | - | | 9 | 2 |
| Oita Trinita | 2015 | J2 League | 9 | 2 | 0 | 0 | – | | – | | – | | 9 | 2 |
| V-Varen Nagasaki | 2016 | J2 League | 41 | 17 | 0 | 0 | – | | – | | – | | 41 | 17 |
| Nagoya Grampus | 2017 | J2 League | 23 | 6 | 2 | 1 | – | | – | | 1 | 0 | 26 | 7 |
| Matsumoto Yamaga | 2018 | J2 League | 24 | 3 | 2 | 2 | – | | – | | – | | 26 | 5 |
| Matsumoto Yamaga | 2019 | J1 League | 27 | 3 | 0 | 0 | 1 | 0 | – | | – | | 28 | 3 |
| Sanfrecce Hiroshima | 2020 | J1 League | 15 | 1 | 0 | 0 | 1 | 0 | – | | – | | 16 | 1 |
| Sanfrecce Hiroshima | 2021 | J1 League | 3 | 0 | 0 | 0 | 1 | 0 | – | | – | | 4 | 0 |
| Sanfrecce Hiroshima | 2022 | J1 League | 8 | 0 | 1 | 0 | 5 | 2 | – | | – | | 14 | 2 |
| Career total | | | 223 | 38 | 9 | 5 | 15 | 3 | 1 | 0 | 2 | 1 | 250 | 47 |
