= Liam Miller =

Irish footballer (1981–2018)

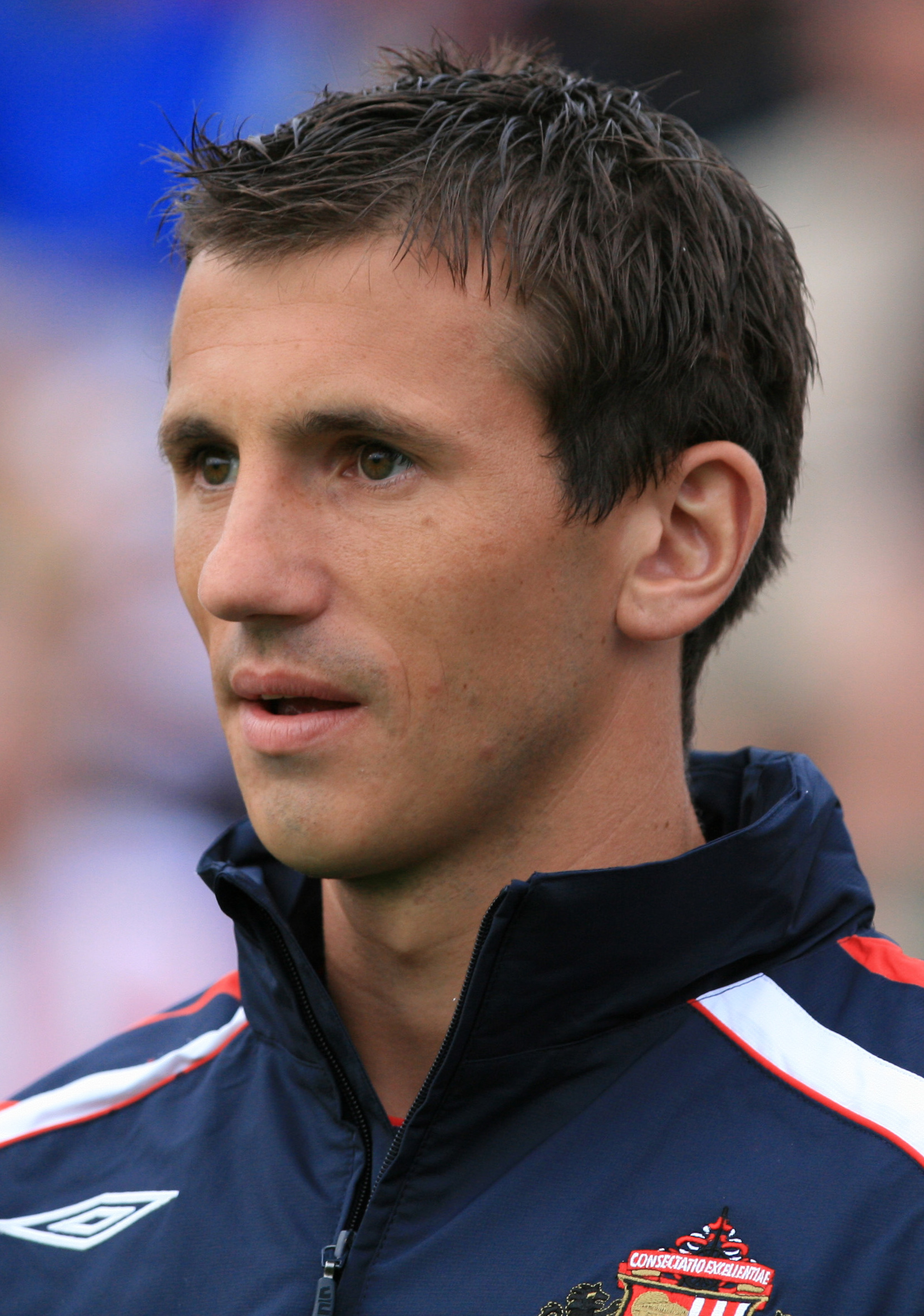
- Miller with Sunderland in 2007

Personal information
- Full name: Liam William Peter Miller
- Date of birth: 13 February 1981
- Place of birth: Cork, Ireland
- Date of death: 9 February 2018 (aged 36)
- Place of death: Cork, Ireland
- Height: 5 ft 7 in (1.70 m)
- Position: Midfielder

Youth career
- –1997: Ballincollig AFC
- 1997–2000: Celtic

Senior career*
Years	Team	Apps	(Gls)
2000–2004	Celtic	26	(2)
2001	→ AGF (loan)	18	(0)
2004–2006	Manchester United	9	(0)
2005–2006	→ Leeds United (loan)	28	(1)
2006–2009	Sunderland	57	(3)
2009	Queens Park Rangers	13	(0)
2009–2011	Hibernian	66	(7)
2011–2013	Perth Glory	44	(2)
2013–2014	Brisbane Roar	21	(3)
2014	Melbourne City	2	(0)
2015	Cork City	29	(0)
2016	Wilmington Hammerheads	25	(1)
Total		338	(19)

International career
1998	Republic of Ireland U16	9	(0)
1998–1999	Republic of Ireland U18	7	(0)
2002	Republic of Ireland U20	4	(0)
2001–2003	Republic of Ireland U21	11	(1)
2004–2009	Republic of Ireland	21	(1)
Medal record
Men's football
Representing Republic of Ireland
UEFA Euro U-16
Winner	1998 Scotland
- * Club domestic league appearances and goals

Liam William Peter Miller (13 February 1981 – 9 February 2018) was an Irish professional footballer. Miller began his career with Celtic and was later loaned to Aarhus in 2001. He returned to Celtic Park and broke into the first-team squad during the 2003–04 season. Rejecting the offer of a new contract from Celtic, he joined Manchester United in 2004 on a free transfer under the Bosman ruling. Loaned to Leeds United during the 2005–06 season, Miller made 22 first-team appearances for Manchester United.

From 2006 until 2009, he played for Sunderland, followed by a short stay at Queens Park Rangers from January until May 2009, when he was released. Miller joined Hibernian in September of that year on a free transfer. He moved to Australia's A-League in 2011 after his contract with Hibernian expired, and represented Perth Glory, Brisbane Roar and Melbourne City there. In 2015, he joined his hometown team Cork City, and a year later Wilmington Hammerheads.

Miller represented the Republic of Ireland team internationally, making his debut in 2004 against the Czech Republic. He earned 21 caps over the next five years, scoring one international goal. Miller died of pancreatic cancer in 2018.

== Early life ==
Miller was born in Cork, Ireland, to Billy Miller, a Scot who was a Celtic fan. He grew up in Ovens, County Cork, and attended Coachford College. As a boy, Miller also played Gaelic games for his hometown club Éire Óg and represented Cork GAA at youth level. In a web chat in 2007, Miller said that his family was his largest influence in football, and that Martin O'Neill and Sir Alex Ferguson were also influential to his career.

== Club career ==
=== Celtic ===
Miller joined Celtic in 1997 as a youth player, and made his professional league debut against Dundee United on 21 May 2000, as a 77th-minute substitute for fellow debutant Ryan McCann. His UEFA Cup debut came against Luxembourg-based club Jeunesse Esch on 24 August 2000 in the second leg of the qualifying round. He came close to scoring in the 64th minute of the 7–0 win (11–0 aggregate). During his time at Celtic Park, he had been on a six-month loan spell with Danish football club AGF Aarhus during the 2001–02 season, making 18 appearances without scoring a goal. They considered signing him permanently for £300,000.

Miller scored his first professional goal on 30 July 2003 in the first leg of the second qualifying round of the UEFA Champions League, coming on as a late substitute to complete a 4–0 win at Lithuania's Kaunas. Two months later in the group stage, he scored against Lyon, and subsequently manager Martin O'Neill offered him a long-term contract, attempting to keep Miller at the club. His first Scottish Premier League goals came in a 5–0 win over Hearts on 18 October, and on 5 November he scored a goal and was given a standing ovation when he was substituted in a 3–1 European win over Anderlecht at Celtic Park. Manchester United manager Sir Alex Ferguson attended the game to scout Anderlecht's Vincent Kompany, but instead was convinced to approach Miller. Miller was on the pitch as a substitute when Celtic secured the 2003–04 Scottish Premier League title.

Despite his offer of a new contract, Miller signed a pre-contract agreement on 9 January 2004 with English Premier League club Manchester United. This move greatly disappointed O'Neill, who had intended to build a new Celtic team around Miller.

=== Manchester United ===
Miller joined Manchester United for free on 1 July 2004, at the expiration of his Celtic contract. He made his United debut on 11 August as a 67th-minute substitute for Darren Fletcher in a 2–1 win at Dinamo Bucharest in the first leg of the third qualifying round of the Champions League. Four days later he made his debut in England's top flight, starting in a 1–0 loss at eventual champions Chelsea on the opening day. He scored his first goal for the club on 26 October against Crewe Alexandra in the third round of the League Cup, finishing a pass by David Bellion in a 3–0 win at Gresty Road. After the start of his career for the Red Devils, he found first-team opportunities rare towards the end of the 2004–05 season. He was given a rare first-team start in January 2005 in an FA Cup tie against non-league Exeter City, but turned in a poor performance and was substituted in the second half. In his entire time at the club he made only 22 first-team appearances. Miller later commented that "Man Utd didn't work out but I have no regrets about giving it a go."

On 4 November 2005, Miller joined Championship club Leeds United on loan for three months, though this was later extended to the end of the 2005–06 season. He made his debut at Elland Road the next day by starting in a goalless draw with Preston North End. Miller scored one goal during his time at Leeds, the winning goal in the 4–3 away win against Southampton on 19 November, this coming after Leeds had been 3–0 down with 19 minutes remaining. Miller featured in the play-off final on 21 May 2006, in which his team lost 3–0 to Watford and he was substituted after 62 minutes for David Healy. During his time at Elland Road, he had scored one goal in 28 games.

In July 2006, The Daily Telegraph reported that Miller would be allowed to leave Manchester United, should the Red Devils receive a suitable offer. On 31 August 2006, he moved to newly relegated Sunderland for free on a three-year deal, joining up with new Sunderland manager and former teammate Roy Keane. He left Manchester United after playing just nine league games in two seasons.

=== Sunderland ===
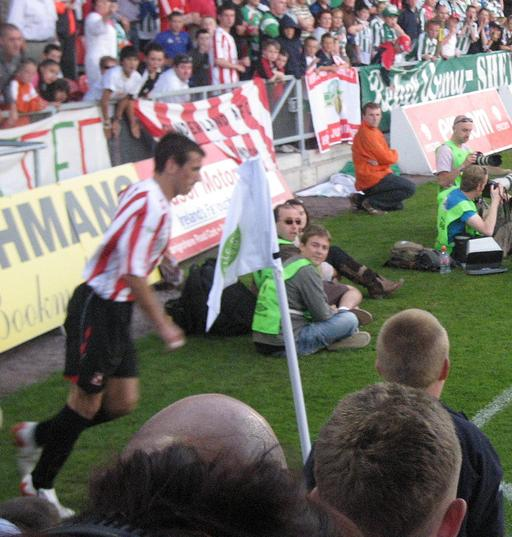
Miller playing against his hometown team Cork City in Sunderland's pre-season tour of Ireland, July 2007

Miller made his debut for Sunderland in a 2–1 win over Derby County on 9 September 2006 at Pride Park Stadium, and scored his first goal in the following game against former team Leeds on 13 September in a 3–0 win, shooting across the goalkeeper from 14 yards. On 6 January 2007, he was sent off by referee Iain Williamson in the 37th minute of an FA Cup third round match against Preston, after receiving his second yellow card for a foul on David Nugent; Sunderland went on to lose the match 1–0. Sunderland ended the season as league champions, returning to the Premier League.

Miller scored his first Premier League goal on 22 September 2007 against North-East rivals Middlesbrough in the Tees-Wear derby; his 89th minute 20-yard left-footed shot sealed a 2–2 draw at the Riverside Stadium. He was sent off for the second time in his Sunderland career by Peter Walton; against Chelsea on 8 December for a push on Claudio Pizarro, as the Black Cats lost 2–0.

In February 2008, Keane placed Miller on the transfer list after deeming him to be surplus to requirements. He was linked with a move to Toronto FC, a Canadian club with ties to former Sunderland players Danny Dichio, Carl Robinson and Andy Welsh.

=== Queens Park Rangers ===
Miller received interest in January 2009 as Championship club Queens Park Rangers expressed their wishes to secure a loan deal. Sunderland manager Ricky Sbragia said "There's been some interest in Liam from QPR, so something might happen there". On 15 January, Miller signed a permanent contract until the end of the season for an undisclosed fee.

He made his debut 12 days later, starting in a 3–0 win at Blackpool. On 19 May, QPR released Miller along with five other players.

=== Hibernian ===
Miller was left without a club after the summer transfer window closed on 31 August 2009, and he was training with clubs in Ireland to maintain his fitness. He called Hibernian manager John Hughes to offer his services. Hughes, who was surprised that Miller was available to him on a free transfer, offered a two-year contract that Miller signed on 11 September. Miller quickly established himself in the Hibs first team, with Graham Spiers describing him as the "king of Hibs" after a 1–1 draw against Rangers at Ibrox. His early performances for Hibs were rewarded with the SPL player of the month award for October 2009. On 20 February, he was sent off in the first half of a 1–0 loss at Motherwell for fouling Jim O'Brien. Despite a downturn in form, Hibs finished fourth in the 2009–10 Scottish Premier League and qualified for European competition. Miller was named in the PFA Scotland Team of the Year for 2009–10.

Miller's form also went into a slump during 2010, and poor results at the start of the 2010–11 season led to the departure of Hughes in October. Miller was sent off near the end of a 2–1 loss at Kilmarnock on 18 December for a foul on Conor Sammon, but on appeal the punishment was reduced to a yellow card. New manager Colin Calderwood signed three new midfielders in January 2011 and Miller was left out of the starting lineup for two games soon afterwards. Calderwood expressed hope that improved results would bring better form out of Miller, who he described as a top-level player. On 3 April, his penalty opened the scoring in a 2–2 draw against Hearts in the Edinburgh derby at Easter Road. Miller expressed a desire to stay at Hibs in March 2011, but the two parties did not agree a new contract and he left at the end of the season.

=== Australia ===
Australian A-League club Perth Glory signed Miller on a two-year contract on 3 June 2011. He made his debut on 9 October, playing the full 90 minutes as the season began with a 1–0 win over Adelaide United at the Perth Oval. On 20 November, he received a straight red card in the first half of a 2–2 draw at Melbourne Victory for denying Archie Thompson a clear goalscoring opportunity. He scored his first goal in Australia on 29 January 2012, concluding a 3–0 win at Adelaide. On 22 April, he played the entirety of the 2012 A-League Grand Final, which his team lost 2–1 at Brisbane Roar. A report from Radio Australia noted how Miller and midfield partner Jacob Burns were "outstanding in leading the Glory's well-structured and hardworking defensive set-up which stifled the Roar's fluid style", until he conceded a penalty with a foul on Besart Berisha at the end of the match, from which the Brisbane player scored the winning goal.

On 17 April 2013, it was announced Miller would not be signing a new deal with Perth, despite an offer being on the table. He joined Brisbane on a free transfer on a two-year deal on 22 May. Miller started for the A-League All Stars in the inaugural A-League All Stars Game against Manchester United on 20 July, losing 5–1 to his former team at the Stadium Australia in Sydney. On 4 May, he played in the 2014 A-League Grand Final at Lang Park, a 2–1 extra-time win over Western Sydney Wanderers.

On 30 October 2014, Miller was released by Brisbane Roar after asking to have his contract terminated following being dropped from the squad for two games with no explanation, which he found unprofessional and disrespectful.

Eleven days after leaving the Roar, Miller signed for another A-League club, Melbourne City, on a short-term contract as a National Replacement Player in place of Aaron Mooy, joining fellow former Irish international Damien Duff. After playing a good game for on his short-term contract, Miller signed another contract with Melbourne City as an Injury Replacement Player in place of Jonatan Germano until the end of December.

=== Later career ===
Miller joined League of Ireland outfit Cork City on 15 January 2015, choosing his hometown club over several offers in Asia. Miller made his debut on 7 March as the season began with a 1–1 draw at Sligo Rovers. Miller was a regular in his only season at Turners Cross, in which his team finished as runners-up in the league and the FAI Cup to Dundalk, and on 19 January 2016 he chose to leave.

He signed with American third-tier United Soccer League side Wilmington Hammerheads on 18 February 2016. He made 27 total appearances for the North Carolina–based club, scoring a last-minute equaliser in a 2–2 draw at Orlando City B on 24 July.

In 2017, Miller held an assistant coaching role at Real Monarchs, a USL affiliate of Real Salt Lake. He left in November due to his cancer treatment.

== International career ==
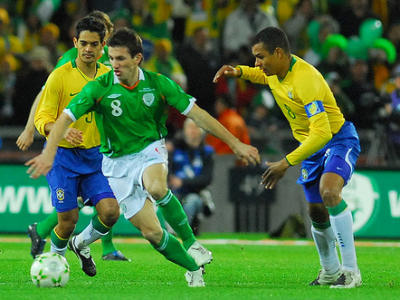
Miller (in green) playing for the Republic of Ireland against Brazil in February 2008

Miller was part of the Irish squad that won the UEFA European Under-16 Football Championship in 1998. He made nine appearances for the Republic of Ireland at under-16 level. He then progressed to the Ireland under-21 team. He was fielded in a game against Albania in 2003 despite having been suspended after receiving two yellow cards in UEFA European Under-21 Football Championship games against Switzerland and Albania. The Football Association of Ireland admitted the mistake and apologised to UEFA.

Miller's debut for the senior team came on 31 March 2004 against Czech Republic in a 2–1 win at Lansdowne Road; he came on as a substitute for Matt Holland. His first goal for Ireland came in a 3–0 win over Sweden on 1 March 2006 where he made a run and a 25-yard shot rifled into the top of the net. Despite Miller being without a club during the summer of 2009, manager Giovanni Trapattoni continued to select him for the Ireland squad. Miller later commented that "I am very grateful to the manager. He didn't need to pick me in the squad but he showed faith in me and I'm delighted with that".

== Personal life ==
Miller and his wife Clare had three children together – two sons and a daughter.

== Death ==
In November 2017, it was made public that Miller was receiving treatment for pancreatic cancer. He had chemotherapy at the Huntsman Cancer Institute in Salt Lake City before returning to Ireland. He died on 9 February 2018, only four days shy of his 37th birthday.

A benefit football match was played on 25 September 2018, with the intention of raising funds for Miller's family and charities. The Gaelic Athletic Association permitted the game to be played at Páirc Uí Chaoimh in Cork, which would not normally have been allowed under GAA rules. The match, between a Manchester United XI and a team composed of former Celtic and Republic of Ireland players, ended with the United XI winning on penalties following a 2–2 draw.

== Career statistics ==
=== Club ===
Appearances and goals by club, season and competition
Club	Season	League			National cup		League cup		Continental (Note: AFC Champions League statistics are included in season commencing during group stages (i.e. ACL 2010 and A-League season 2009–2010 etc.))		Other (Note: Includes Football League play-offs and A-League Finals series.)		Total	
Club	Season	Division	Apps	Goals	Apps	Goals	Apps	Goals	Apps	Goals	Apps	Goals	Apps	Goals
Celtic	1999–2000	Scottish Premier League	1	0	0	0	0	0	0	0	—		1	0
Celtic	2000–01	Scottish Premier League	0	0	0	0	0	0	1	0	—		1	0
Celtic	2002–03	Scottish Premier League	0	0	0	0	1	0	1	0	—		2	0
Celtic	2003–04	Scottish Premier League	25	2	1	0	1	0	13	3	—		40	5
Celtic	Total		26	2	1	0	2	0	15	3	—		44	5
AGF (loan)	2001–02	Danish Superliga	18	0	0	0	—		—		—		18	0
Manchester United	2004–05	Premier League	8	0	4	0	2	1	5	0	0	0	19	1
Manchester United	2005–06	Premier League	1	0	0	0	1	1	1	0	—		3	1
Manchester United	Total		9	0	4	0	3	2	6	0	0	0	22	2
Leeds United (loan)	2005–06	Championship	28	1	2	0	0	0	—		3	0	33	1
Sunderland	2006–07	Championship	30	2	1	0	0	0	—		—		31	2
Sunderland	2007–08	Premier League	24	1	0	0	1	0	—		—		25	1
Sunderland	2008–09	Premier League	3	0	0	0	1	0	—		—		4	0
Sunderland	Total		57	3	1	0	2	0	—		—		60	3
Queens Park Rangers	2008–09	Championship	13	0	0	0	0	0	—		—		13	0
Hibernian	2009–10	Scottish Premier League	33	2	4	0	1	0	—		—		38	2
Hibernian	2010–11	Scottish Premier League	33	5	2	0	1	0	2	0	—		38	5
Hibernian	Total		66	7	6	0	2	0	2	0	—		76	7
Perth Glory	2011–12	A-League	21	2	—		—		—		4	0	25	2
Perth Glory	2012–13	A-League	23	0	—		—		—		1	0	24	0
Perth Glory	Total		44	2	—		—		—		5	0	49	2
Brisbane Roar	2013–14	A-League	19	3	—		—		—		2	0	21	3
Brisbane Roar	2014–15	A-League	2	0	0	0	—		0	0	0	0	2	0
Brisbane Roar	Total		21	3	0	0	—		0	0	2	0	23	3
Melbourne City	2014–15	A-League	2	0	0	0	—		—		0	0	2	0
Cork City	2015	League of Ireland	29	0	4	0	0	0	2	0	—		35	0
Wilmington Hammerheads	2016	USL	25	1	2	0	—		—		—		27	1
Career total			338	19	20	0	9	2	25	3	10	0	402	24

=== International ===
Score and result list Republic of Ireland's goal tally first, score column indicates score after Miller goal.

International goal scored by Liam Miller
No.	Date	Venue	Opponent	Score	Result	Competition
1	1 March 2006	Lansdowne Road, Dublin, Republic of Ireland	Sweden	3–0	3–0	Friendly

== Honours ==
Celtic

- Scottish Premier League: 2003–04

Sunderland

- Football League Championship: 2006–07

Brisbane Roar

- A-League Championship: 2013–14
- A-League Premiership: 2013–14

Republic of Ireland U16

- UEFA European Under-16 Championship: 1998

Individual

- PFA Scotland Premier League Team of the Year: 2009–10
- A-League All Star: 2013
