= Andy Higgins (footballer, born 1993) =

Australian soccer player

Personal information
- Full name: Andrew Higgins
- Date of birth: 21 September 1993 (age 33)
- Place of birth: Perth, Western Australia
- Positions: Left back; left winger

Youth career
- –2010: ECU Joondalup
- 2010–2012: Portsmouth
- 2013–2014: Perth Glory

Senior career*
Years	Team	Apps	(Gls)
2012	Portsmouth	0	(0)
2012–2013	Perth Glory	0	(0)
2013–2014	Heathridge		
2014–2022	ECU Joondalup	138	(9)
2023	Perth RedStar	22	(1)
- * Club domestic league appearances and goals

Andrew Higgins (born 21 September 1993) is an Australian retired soccer player who played as a left back or left winger.

== Career ==
=== Portsmouth ===
Born in Perth, Higgins moved to England, and signed a two-year scholarship with Portsmouth on 15 July 2010.

On 14 August 2012, he made his debut in the League Cup in a 3–0 defeat at Plymouth Argyle.

=== Perth Glory ===
On 20 November 2012, Higgins cancelled his contract at Portsmouth to return home to Australia, in order to search for first team football, and subsequently joined Perth Glory's U21 squad. On 13 January 2013 he made his debut, coming on as a second-half substitute in a 6–4 Youth Football League win at Newcastle Jets.

Higgins appeared in three further Youth League matches during the season (against Sydney FC, Central Coast Mariners and Melbourne Heart) before subsequently leaving the club.

=== ECU Joondalup ===
In January 2014, Higgins joined his first club ECU Joondalup.

== Career statistics ==
As of 19 September 2018

Club	Season	League		FA Cup		League Cup		Other		Total	
Club	Season	Apps	Goals	Apps	Goals	Apps	Goals	Apps	Goals	Apps	Goals
Portsmouth	2012–13	0	0	0	0	1	0	—		1	0
Perth Glory	2012–13	0	0	0	0	0	0	—		0	0
ECU Joondalup	2014	21	0	0	0	0	0	—		21	0
ECU Joondalup	2015	9	0	0	0	0	0	—		9	0
ECU Joondalup	2016	20	1	0	0	0	0	—		20	1
ECU Joondalup	2017	0	0	0	0	0	0	—		0	0
ECU Joondalup	2018	22	1	0	0	0	0	—		22	1
ECU Joondalup	Subtotal	72	2	0	0	0	0	—		72	2
Career total		72	2	0	0	1	0	—		73	2
