= Cameron Edwards =

Australian soccer player (born 1992)

Personal information
- Full name: Cameron James Edwards
- Date of birth: 27 March 1992 (age 34)
- Place of birth: Sydney, Australia
- Height: 1.80 m (5 ft 11 in)
- Position: Central midfielder

Team information
- Current team: Bayswater City

Youth career
- –2008: Cockburn City
- 2009–2011: Perth Glory
- 2011–2012: Reading
- 2012–2013: Melbourne Heart

Senior career*
Years	Team	Apps	(Gls)
2008	Cockburn City		
2011	Perth Glory	1	(0)
2012–2013	Melbourne Heart	0	(0)
2013–2015	Perth Glory	13	(0)
2014	Perth Glory NPL	8	(0)
2015	Putrajaya SPA	9	(0)
2016–2021	Cockburn City	118	(5)
2022–	Bayswater City	19	(1)

International career
- Australia U17
- * Club domestic league appearances and goals as of 23 November 2023

Cameron James Edwards (born 27 March 1992) is an Australian professional soccer player who plays as a midfielder for Fremantle City FC. Edwards previously trained with the Nike Football Academy after being released by Reading in May 2012.

== Career ==
=== Perth Glory ===
Born in Sydney, Edwards made his professional debut in the A-League for Perth Glory on 23 January 2011 against Wellington Phoenix, coming on as a substitute in the 84th minute of the game in a 4–0 loss.

=== Reading ===
On 29 April 2011, it was announced he had signed with Championship side Reading along with his younger brother Ryan. On 2 May 2012 Reading announced that Cameron had been released by the club.

=== Melbourne Heart ===
On 31 December 2012 it was announced that Edwards had joined A-League side Melbourne Heart following a stint at the Nike Football Academy.

=== Perth Glory ===
Edwards signed with Perth Glory in May 2013, linking up with his father. His brother would later join the Glory on a season long loan. Edwards made his debut for the Glory on 20 October 2013, coming on as a 59th-minute substitute for Steven McGarry, in their 0-0 away draw against Newcastle Jets.

== Personal life ==
Cameron is a son of former Australian international Alistair Edwards, his mother is a Singaporean national, and he is the older brother of fellow soccer player Ryan.
