= Riley Woodcock =

Australian soccer player

Personal information
- Full name: Riley Paul Woodcock
- Date of birth: 23 May 1995 (age 31)
- Place of birth: Perth, Australia
- Height: 1.74 m (5 ft 8 1/2 in)
- Position: Left back

Team information
- Current team: Fremantle City (fitness trainers)

Youth career
- –2010: Cockburn City
- 2010: FW NTC
- 2010–2012: AIS
- 2012–2015: Perth Glory

Senior career*
Years	Team	Apps	(Gls)
2013–2015	Perth Glory	14	(0)
2014–2015	Perth Glory NPL	8	(2)
2015–2016	Sydney FC	1	(0)
2016	Cockburn City	4	(0)
2016–2017	Sydney FC	0	(0)
2017	Sydney United	11	(1)
2018	Sydney Olympic	28	(0)
2019–2021	Cockburn City	29	(5)
2021	ECU Joondalup	16	(1)
2022–2024	Floreat Athena	8	(2)

International career^{‡}
2011	Australia U17	4	(2)
2014–2015	Australia U20	6	(1)
2014–2015	Australia U23	2	(0)
- * Club domestic league appearances and goals as of 15 September 2022 ‡ National team caps and goals as of 13 September 2015

Riley Paul Woodcock is a former Australian professional soccer player who played as a left back.

== Early career ==
Woodcock advanced through the youth setup at Cockburn City SC, the Australian Institute of Sport and Perth Glory FC.

== Senior career ==
=== Sydney FC ===
After getting limited game time at Perth despite consistently being selected for and captaining Australian youth squads, Woodcock opted to join fellow Western Australian Brandon O'Neill and switch to the eastern seaboard, both signing with Sydney FC for the 2015–16 A-League season. After 6 appearances in all tournaments over the season, Woodcock was released from Sydney FC as part of their rebuild.

Despite being released by Sydney FC, Woodcock played the 2nd half of a pre-season friendly against Adelaide United. Days before the start of the 2016–17 A-League season, it was announced that he had re-signed on a one-year deal.

In February 2017, Woodcock was released by Sydney FC to pursue other career options. Riley signed with Sydney United for the 2017 NSW Premier League season. In September 2017, Riley signed with NSW Premier League club Sydney Olympic for the 2018 season.

== Career statistics ==
=== Club ===
As of 26 May 2016

Club	Season	League			Cup		Continental		Total	
Club	Season	Division	Apps	Goals	Apps	Goals	Apps	Goals	Apps	Goals
Perth Glory	2013–14	A-League	13	0	—		—		13	0
Perth Glory	2014–15	A-League	1	0	0	0	—		1	0
Perth Glory	Total		14	0	0	0	—		14	0
Sydney FC	2015–16	A-League	1	0	2	0	3	0	6	0
Career total			15	0	2	0	3	0	20	0
