= Sidnei Sciola =

Brazilian footballer

Personal information
- Full name: Sidnei Sciola Moraes
- Date of birth: 2 November 1986 (age 40)
- Place of birth: Santana de Parnaíba, São Paulo, Brazil
- Height: 1.76 m (5 ft 9 in)
- Position: Winger

Senior career*
Years	Team	Apps	(Gls)
2007	Noroeste		
2008	Bandeirante		
2008–2009	Boavista	28	(4)
2009–2011	Rio Ave	33	(1)
2011	Enosis Neon Paralimni	13	(2)
2012–2013	Alki Larnaca	44	(3)
2013–2016	Perth Glory	42	(6)
2016–2017	Juárez	33	(2)
2018	Ituano	6	(1)
2018	Ethnikos Achna	8	(2)
2019	Omonia Aradippou	9	(3)
2020	Veranópolis	3	(1)
- * Club domestic league appearances and goals as of 14:36, 24 May 2021 (UTC)

Sidnei Sciola Moraes (born 2 February 1986, in Santana de Parnaíba, São Paulo) was a former footballer who played as a winger.
