= Steven McGarry =

Scottish former footballer

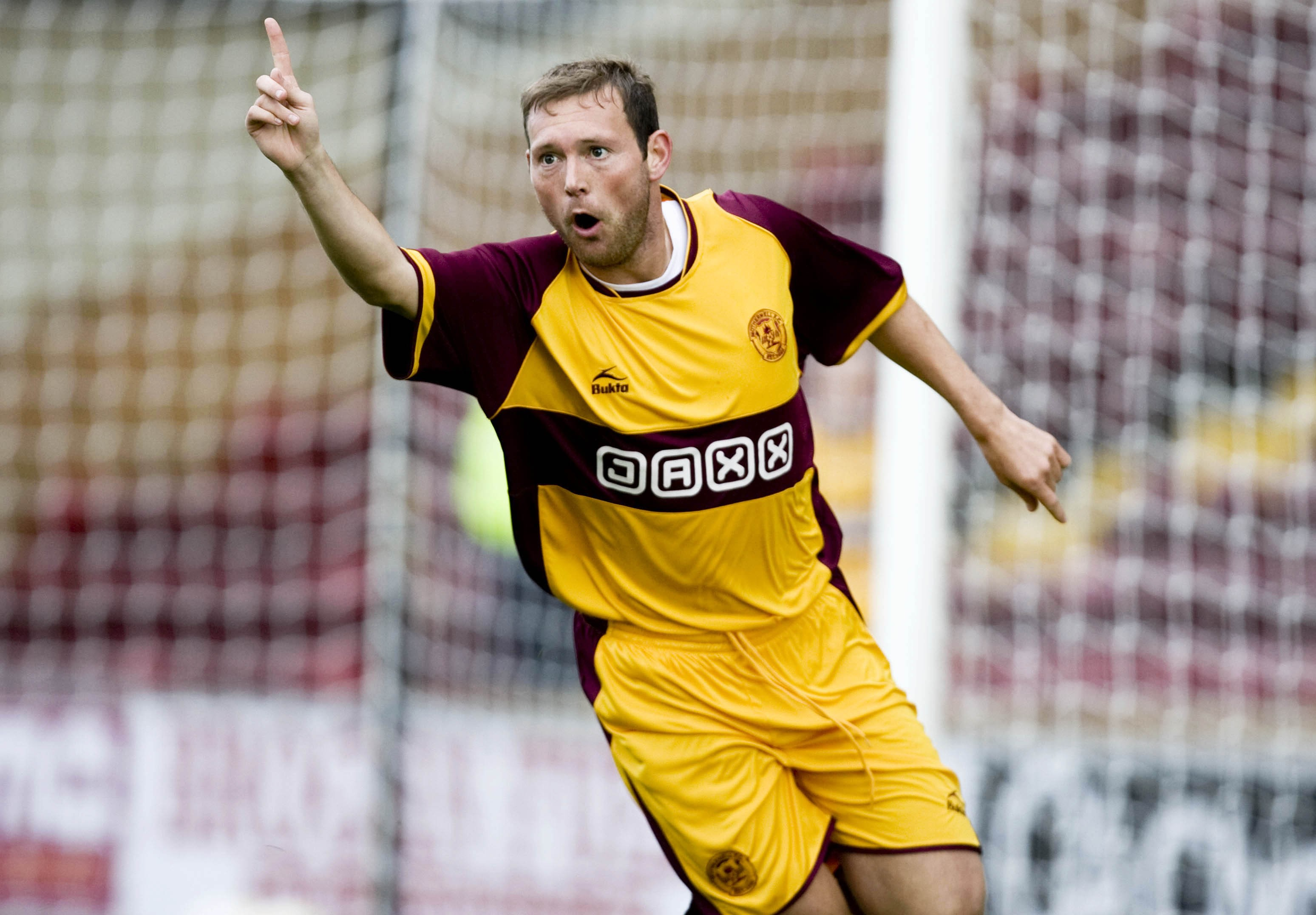
- Steven McGarry playing for Motherwell.

Personal information
- Full name: Steven Thomas McGarry
- Date of birth: 28 September 1979 (age 47)
- Place of birth: Paisley, Scotland
- Position: Central midfielder

Team information
- Current team: Nakhon Si United (head coach)

Senior career*
Years	Team	Apps	(Gls)
1996–2002	St Mirren	151	(25)
2002	→ Boston United (loan)	6	(0)
2002–2006	Ross County	102	(13)
2006–2010	Motherwell	89	(4)
2010–2014	Perth Glory	114	(11)
2015	Gwelup Croatia		
2016–2018	ECU Joondalup	62	(9)
Total		524	(62)

International career
1996	Scotland U17		
1996	Scotland U19		
1997	Scotland U21	3	(1)

Managerial career
- 2020–2022: Perth Glory (assistant)
- 2023–2025: Sorrento FC
- 2026–: Nakhon Si United
- * Club domestic league appearances and goals

Steven Thomas McGarry (born 28 September 1979) is a Scottish football coach and former professional player. He is the current head coach of Thai League 3 club Nakhon Si United. He started coaching as assistant at A-League Men side Perth Glory, the club McGarry last played for.

McGarry is on the Scotland U21s youngest scorer list, scoring in the 1997 Toulon Tournament against the USA, aged 17 years and 241 days. In March 2018, McGarry was one of four former St Mirren F.C. players voted by supporters to have a street named in his honour – McGarry Terrace – following a public competition run by Renfrewshire Council.

== Club career ==
McGarry previously played for St Mirren and Ross County in Scottish Premier League and also had a loan spell at Boston United in England. He also played for Motherwell between 2006 and 2010.

=== Perth Glory FC ===
McGarry moved to Australian team Perth Glory during the 2010 January transfer window. On 9 May 2012, he signed a one-year contract extension with the club.

In 2013 McGarry was crowned the Most Glorious Player (MGP), while also picking up the players' player of the year award and the goal of the year prize for his stunning strike in a 1–0 victory over Brisbane Roar in December.

== Coaching career ==
=== Perth Glory FC ===
Post playing career in 2015, McGarry transitioned into coaching Perth Glory's NYL & NPL U20s squads. McGarry rejoined the club in 2018 to take up the position of academy technical director & NPL U18s head coach.

=== ECU Joondalup SC ===
In 2016 he accepted a position at NPL team ECU Joondalup to return to playing, while also taking up the 1st team assistant & technical director roles. While still at ECU Joondalup, McGarry was appointed assistant coach to Chris Coyne for the Western Australia state team.

== Media ==
In October 2017, McGarry joined the inaugural Croc Media Expert commentary team. He was expert commentator for the blockbuster clash between English Giants Manchester United & Leeds United at Optus Stadium during their tour of Australia in 2019.

== Managerial statistics ==
As of match played 25 April 2026

Managerial record by team and tenure
Team	Nat.	From	To	Record					Ref.
Team	Nat.	From	To	G	W	D	L	Win %	Ref.
Nakhon Si United	(Thailand)	27 February 2026	Present	9	1	5	3	11.11	

== Honours ==
=== Player ===
St Mirren

- Scottish Championship 1999–2000 Scottish First Division

Individual
St Mirren

- Young Player of the Year 1999–2000 Scottish First Division

Perth Glory

- Most Glorious Player (MGP) 2012–13 Perth Glory FC season
- Goal of the Season 2012–13
- Players Player of the Year 2012–13
- Golden Boot 2013–14 Perth Glory FC season

=== Managerial ===
Sorrento

- Football West State League Division 1: 2024
