= Adrian Zahra =

Australian footballer (born 1990)

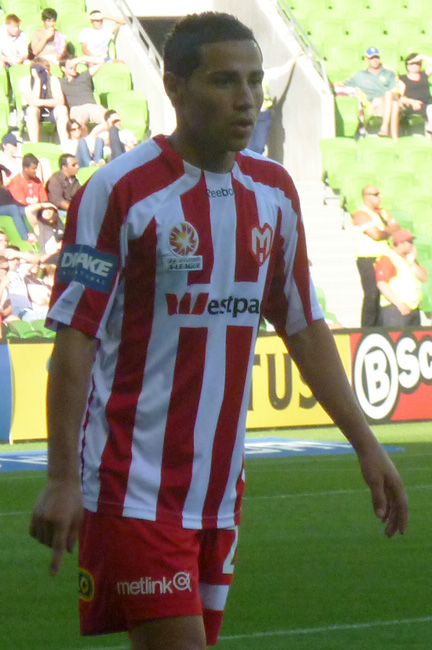
- Zahra playing for Melbourne Heart in 2011

Personal information
- Date of birth: 24 September 1990 (age 36)
- Place of birth: Melbourne, Australia
- Height: 1.69 m (5 ft 7 in)
- Position: Midfielder

Team information
- Current team: Essendon Royals
- Number: 8

Youth career
- Fawkner Blues
- North City Lions
- Melbourne Knights

Senior career*
Years	Team	Apps	(Gls)
2007–2010	Melbourne Knights	45	(2)
2009	→ Western Suburbs (loan)	20	(4)
2010–2012	Melbourne Heart	19	(2)
2012–2014	Perth Glory	18	(3)
2014	Valletta	4	(2)
2015	Melbourne Knights	11	(0)
2015–2016	Port Melbourne	33	(2)
2016–2024	Heidelberg United	163	(24)
2025	Bentleigh Greens	23	(1)
2026–	Essendon Royals	8	(0)
- * Club domestic league appearances and goals as of 11 April 2026

Adrian Zahra (born 24 September 1990) is an Australian professional footballer who plays for Victoria Premier League 2 club Essendon Royals.

== Career ==
=== Melbourne Knights ===
Zahra started his career being coached by Billy Vojtek in the youth system of Melbourne Knights before progressing to the senior side for the 2007–08 season. He played nearly every game for the Knights in 2008 off the bench, but was soon loaned out to Western Suburbs SC in 2009 in the league below, the Victorian State League Division 1. In 2010, Zahra returned to the Knights and capped off a sensational year with the club by receiving the 2010 Victorian Premier League U21 Player of the Year Award.

=== Melbourne Heart ===
While still with Melbourne Knights, Zahra made a trial appearance for new A-League side Melbourne Heart, in an exhibition match against Premier League team Everton on 14 July 2010, which Heart lost 2–0. Melbourne Heart went on to sign Zahra midway through their inaugural 2010-11 A-League season on a short-term contract upon the completion of the 2010 Victorian Premier League season. His contract was originally four weeks in length. He made his début for the Heart in October 2010, in the first ever Melbourne derby. After an extended trial period, in which he scored two goals for Heart, he was signed by the club in December for an extra two years, his contract starting at the beginning of the 2011–12 season.

His season was cut short after an infamous incident during the third Melbourne derby on 22 January 2011. He was tackled by Melbourne Victory's Kevin Muscat late in the game, which made worldwide headlines. As a result, Zahra sustained a serious knee injury in his right leg. Muscat received a red card for the tackle and was subsequently handed an 8-match ban. Zahra was substituted out of the match, being unable to continue playing. He missed the remainder of the season due to the injury. Surgery was required on his knee.

The injury & recovery kept him out for the entire 2011/12 season.

=== Perth Glory ===
On 27 April 2012, Zahra signed with the Perth Glory. He made eight appearances for Perth in his first season there, including one goal against Adelaide United in Round 27. The following season, Zahra made 10 appearances, scoring two goals. After the completion of his contract at the end of the 2013–14 season, Zahra left the Glory.

=== Valletta ===
Zahra then signed his first overseas contract, penning a deal with Maltese side Valletta. His stay there was only short lived, making five appearances and scoring two goals before being released in early December 2014.

=== NPL Victoria ===
Zahra's return to Melbourne Knights FC was confirmed by the club on 16 February 2015, days before the start of the 2015 NPL Victoria season. The winger left the Knights in mid-2015 to sign for NPL Victoria rivals Port Melbourne SC. At Port Melbourne, Zahra made 33 appearances and netted two goals. He left Port Melbourne at the end of the 2016 season to sign with league heavyweights Heidelberg United FC for the 2017 season.

== Personal life ==
Zahra is of Maltese, Italian descent. He attended high school at Penola Catholic College.
