= Jacob Burns (soccer) =

Australian soccer player

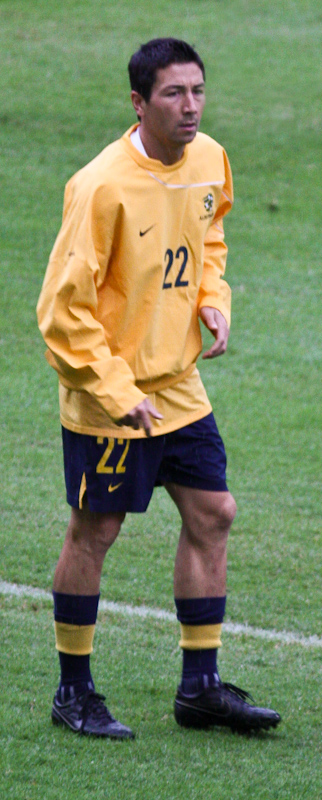
- Burns training with Australia in 2009

Personal information
- Full name: Jacob Geoffrey Burns
- Date of birth: 21 April 1978 (age 48)
- Place of birth: Sydney, Australia
- Height: 1.78 m (5 ft 10 in)
- Position: Defensive midfielder

Youth career
- Sydney Olympic
- St George Saints

Senior career*
Years	Team	Apps	(Gls)
1996–1999	Sydney United	60	(5)
1999–2000	Parramatta Power	25	(3)
2000–2003	Leeds United	27	(0)
2003–2006	Barnsley	89	(6)
2006–2008	Wisła Kraków	22	(0)
2008–2009	Unirea Urziceni	19	(0)
2009–2014	Perth Glory	116	(3)
Total		337	(17)

International career
1999–2000	Australia U23	10	(0)
2000–2010	Australia	11	(0)
- * Club domestic league appearances and goals

Jacob Geoffrey Burns (born 21 April 1978) is an Australian former professional footballer who played as a defensive midfielder.

== Biography ==
=== Club career ===
Jacob Burns began his career with the local team Sydney United. He then moved to local rivals Parramatta Power, whom he left in 2000 to join the Premier League club Leeds United. They signed him as squad cover, and he only played ten games during his three-year stay. This included three appearances during Leeds' run to the semi-finals of the 2000-01 UEFA Champions League.

His contract was allowed to run out, and on 17 October 2003 he joined Barnsley on a free transfer. He also spent three seasons at Barnsley however these were a lot more respectable, as he played 91 times gaining 8 goals and one assist, as well as the club captaincy.

However, he craved another chance at international football, and so in 2006 he followed the chance of Champions League football to Ekstraklasa champions Wisla Krakow.

When Wisła manager Dan Petrescu moved to Romanian top-flight team Unirea Urziceni at the start of the 2008–09 season, the Australian followed.

Burns' time in Romania was of mixed form and inconsistent appearances, and at the end of that one season, he decided the time was right for a return to his home land. On 4 May 2009, it was announced that Burns had signed a three-year contract with A-League club Perth Glory. He has also been awarded the club captaincy.

In the 2011–12 season, Burns led the Glory to the A-League Grand Final, and despite losing, he was awarded the Joe Marston Medal awarded to the best player of the match. Burns was in turns praised and criticised for the sportsmanship he showed after the match, following the controversial penalty decision that won Brisbane Roar the championship, and the FFA 'administrative error' which saw the Joe Marston medal incorrectly awarded to Thomas Broich during the on-field presentations.

Burns played his 100th game for Glory on 23 November 2013 in a game against Central Coast Mariners, and he was handed a two-match ban.

On 4 April 2014 Jacob Burns announced his retirement from football.

=== International career ===
Burns made his full international debut in 2000 against Scotland, and played again in 2001 against Colombia. However his lack of first team football, and then the level of football he played with Barnsley meant that he dropped out of contention.

He made his return to the Australia squad for the 2–0 loss to Kuwait on 6 September 2006.

His fourth cap came against Denmark in 2007. In the same year he came off the bench to earn his fifth cap against China where Australia won the match 2–0. He received a late call up to the Australian squad against Nigeria as a replacement for Tim Cahill, and came on at the start of the second half. He gained another cap in a friendly game against Ghana in Sydney, where he started the match, and came off on the 79th minute.

He earned another cap on 10 September 2008 when he replaced Jason Culina in the starting line-up to face Uzbekistan in a World Cup Qualifier. Burns won the praise of Socceroos coach Pim Verbeek for filling in for a virus-stricken Culina at the last minute and performing admirably alongside Carl Valeri in defensive midfield in the side's 1–0 win in Tashkent.

His most recent appearance was on 17 June 2009 when he came on as a second-half substitute against Japan in a World Cup Qualifier won 2–1 by Australia.

== National team statistics ==
Australia
Year	Apps	Goals
2000	1	0
2001	1	0
2007	3	0
2008	4	0
2009	1	0
2010	1	0
Total	11	0

== Honours ==
Sydney United

- Australian National Soccer League: 1998–99

Unirea Urziceni

- Liga I: 2008–09
