= 2014–15 National Youth League (Australia) =

National Youth League
- Season: 2014–15
- Premiers: Melbourne City Youth (1st title)
- Matches: 66
- Goals: 223 (3.38 per match)
- Top goalscorer: Wade Dekker (9)
- Biggest home win: Central Coast Mariners Youth 6–0 FFA Centre of Excellence (17 December 2014); Brisbane Roar Youth 6–0 FFA Centre of Excellence (15 February 2015)
- Biggest away win: FFA Centre of Excellence 0–5 Newcastle Jets Youth (8 November 2014)
- Highest scoring: Perth Glory Youth 5–3 Central Coast Mariners Youth (16 November 2014)

The 2014–15 National Youth League (Also known as the Foxtel National Youth League for sponsorship reasons) was the seventh season of the Australian National Youth League competition. The season ran in parallel with the 2014–15 A-League season.

== Teams ==
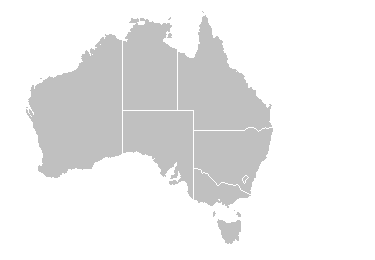

Team	Home city	Home ground
Adelaide United Youth	Adelaide	Adelaide Shores Football Centre
Brisbane Roar Youth	Brisbane	Goodwin Park
Central Coast Mariners Youth	Gosford	Central Coast Mariners Centre of Excellence
FFA Centre of Excellence	Canberra	Australian Institute of Sport
Melbourne City Youth	Melbourne	Epping Stadium
Melbourne Victory Youth	Melbourne	Lakeside Stadium
Newcastle Jets Youth	Newcastle	Rockwell Automation Park
Perth Glory Youth	Perth	Intiga Stadium
Sydney FC Youth	Sydney	Lambert Park
Western Sydney Wanderers Youth	Sydney	Blacktown International Sportspark

== Standings ==
Pos	Team	Pld	W	D	L	GF	GA	GD	Pts
1	Melbourne City Youth (C)	18	10	5	3	40	27	+13	35
2	Brisbane Roar Youth	18	11	2	5	38	25	+13	35
3	Perth Glory Youth	18	10	4	4	33	24	+9	34
4	Sydney FC Youth	18	8	4	6	40	27	+13	28
5	Melbourne Victory Youth	18	8	3	7	34	33	+1	27
6	Central Coast Mariners Academy	18	8	2	8	38	34	+4	26
7	Adelaide United Youth	18	7	2	9	28	27	+1	23
8	Newcastle Jets Youth	18	7	2	9	31	37	−6	23
9	Western Sydney Wanderers Youth	18	6	2	10	21	29	−8	20
10	FFA Centre of Excellence	18	1	2	15	11	51	−40	5

Source: au.soccerway.com
Rules for classification: 1) points; 2) goal difference; 3) number of goals scored.
(C) Champions

== Positions by round ==
Team ╲ Round	1	2	3	4	5	6	7	8	9	10	11	12	13	14	15	16	17	18
Melbourne City	10	3	3	1	2	2	2	2	2	2	2	2	1	1	1	1	1	1
Brisbane Roar	6	2	1	4	3	4	3	3	3	3	3	3	3	4	3	3	3	2
Perth Glory	2	5	2	2	1	1	1	1	1	1	1	1	2	2	2	2	2	3
Sydney FC	9	10	7	5	4	5	5	6	7	6	5	7	9	8	7	4	4	4
Melbourne Victory	4	1	5	7	7	6	6	8	8	8	8	8	7	6	5	8	5	5
Central Coast Mariners	6	7	8	9	6	8	7	5	5	7	6	5	6	5	6	6	7	6
Adelaide United	1	4	6	8	9	7	8	7	6	5	7	6	4	3	4	5	6	7
Newcastle Jets	4	8	10	6	8	9	9	9	9	9	9	9	8	9	8	7	8	8
Western Sydney Wanderers	3	6	4	3	5	3	4	4	4	4	4	4	5	7	9	9	9	9
FFA Centre of Excellence	8	9	9	10	10	10	10	10	10	10	10	10	10	10	10	10	10	10

NOTES:

- Melbourne Victory were tied with Newcastle Jets at the end of Round 1, as were Brisbane Roar and Central Coast Mariners.
- Newcastle Jets and Sydney FC have a game in hand between Rounds 2 and 13, with their Round 2 game to be played before the start of Round 14 on Tuesday 27 January.
- Western Sydney Wanderers and FFA Centre of Excellence have a game in hand between Rounds 7 and 13, with their Round 2 game to be played before the start of Round 14 on Tuesday 27 January.

== Fixtures ==
=== Round 1 ===
14 October 2014	Sydney FC Youth	0–1	Western Sydney Wanderers Youth	Sydney
18:00 AEDT		Report	Trajkovski 2'	Stadium: Lambert Park

18 October 2014	Perth Glory Youth	3–2	FFA Centre of Excellence	Perth
11:00 AWST	Knowles 44', 48'; Sam 79'		10'; 20'	Stadium: Intiga Stadium

18 October 2014	Adelaide United Youth	3–1	Melbourne City Youth	Adelaide
14:30 ACDT	D. Smith 65', 81'; Costa 89'	Report	Kecojevic 88'	Stadium: Adelaide Shores Football Centre; Attendance: 220

18 October 2014	Newcastle Jets Youth	3–3	Melbourne Victory Youth	Newcastle
16:00 AEDT		Report	Dover (?); Nabbout (?); Katebian (?)	Stadium: Magic Park; Referee: Trent Nash

19 October 2014	Central Coast Mariners Youth	0–0	Brisbane Roar Youth	Tuggerah
14:30 AEDT		Report		Stadium: Central Coast Mariners Centre of Excellence; Referee: Lachlan Daniel

=== Round 2 ===
25 October 2014	FFA Centre of Excellence	1–1	Central Coast Mariners Youth	Canberra
15:00 AEDT	Arzani 41'		Buhagiar 39'	Stadium: Australian Institute of Sport; Referee: Ben Abrahams

25 October 2014	Brisbane Roar Youth	1–0	Adelaide United Youth	Brisbane
16:00 AEST	Clut 7'	Report		Stadium: Goodwin Park; Referee: Dylan Lambert

26 October 2014	Melbourne City Youth	4–1	Western Sydney Wanderers Youth	Melbourne
14:00 AEDT	Prelevic 3'; Marino 39', 79'; Mauk 63'	Report	Trajkovski 64'	Stadium: Broadmeadows Valley; Referee: Harley Natis

26 October 2014	Melbourne Victory Youth	3–1	Perth Glory Youth	Melbourne
14:30 AEDT	Nabbout 6', 69'; Katebian 45+1'	Report	Knowles 20'	Stadium: Lakeside Stadium; Referee: Adrian Arndt

27 January 2015	Newcastle Jets Youth	2–3	Sydney FC Youth	Weston
16:00 AEDT	Crowley 22'; Timotheou 24' (o.g.)	Report	Tsekenis 50', 55'; Koleski 72'	Stadium: Rockwell Automation Park

=== Round 3 ===
1 November 2014	Melbourne Victory Youth	1–2	Brisbane Roar Youth	Melbourne
13:30 AEDT	Maclean 2'	report	Clut 15'; Danning 73'	Stadium: Lakeside Stadium; Referee: Adam Bavcar

1 November 2014	Melbourne City Youth	2–1	FFA Centre of Excellence	Melbourne
14:00 AEDT	Dekker 16'; Brown 90+1'	Report	Arzani 39' (pen.)	Stadium: Broadmeadows Valley

2 November 2014	Western Sydney Wanderers Youth	1–0	Adelaide United Youth	Sydney
13:30 AEDT	Lo 89'	Report		Stadium: Blacktown International Sportspark

2 November 2014	Perth Glory Youth	3–0	Newcastle Jets Youth	Perth
11:00 AWST	B. O'Neill 38'; Knowles 39', 47' (pen.)	Report	Oxborrow (yellow card) ?' (red card) 76'	Stadium: Ashfield Sports Club; Referee: Nico Hoyle

3 November 2014	Sydney FC Youth	1–0	Central Coast Mariners Youth	Sydney
18:00 AEDT	Burgess (red card) 29'; Andrew 85'	Report		Stadium: Lambert Park; Referee: Lachlan Daniel

=== Round 4 ===
8 November 2014	Central Coast Mariners Youth	1–2	Perth Glory Youth	Tuggerah
11:00 AEDT	Perre 49'	Report	Vulin 45+2' (yellow card) ?' (red card) 90+3'; Harold 75'	Stadium: Central Coast Mariners Centre of Excellence; Referee: Trent Nash

8 November 2014	Western Sydney Wanderers Youth	3–0	Melbourne Victory Youth	Sydney
14:30 AEDT	Kuzmanovski (?); Maia (?)	Report		Stadium: Blacktown International Sportspark

8 November 2014	FFA Centre of Excellence	0–5	Newcastle Jets Youth	Canberra
16:00 AEDT			Lundy 42', 81'; Pavicevic 64'; 73'; 88'	Stadium: Australian Institute of Sport; Referee: Harley Natis

8 November 2014	Adelaide United Youth	0–4	Sydney FC Youth	Adelaide
16:00 AEDT		Report	Blackwood 18'; Andrew 25'; Antoniou 43'; Araujo 81'	Stadium: Adelaide Shores Football Centre; Referee: Jarrod Muller

9 November 2014	Brisbane Roar Youth	0–3	Melbourne City Youth	Brisbane
14:30 AEST		Report	Kecojevic 44'; Mauk 67'; Mullett 74'	Stadium: Goodwin Park

=== Round 5 ===
15 November 2014	Melbourne Victory Youth	0–0	Melbourne City Youth	Melbourne
15:00 AEDT		Report		Stadium: Lakeside Stadium

15 November 2014	Newcastle Jets Youth	0–2	Brisbane Roar Youth	Weston
19:00 AEDT			Clut 51'; Danning 77' (pen.)	Stadium: Rockwell Automation Park

16 November 2014	Perth Glory Youth	3–1	Western Sydney Wanderers Youth	Perth
11:00 AWST	B. O'Neill 9', 30'; Knowles 78'	Report	Kuzmanovski 90'	Stadium: Ashfield Sports Club; Referee: Matthew Southern

16 November 2014	Adelaide United Youth	0–1	Central Coast Mariners Youth	Adelaide
16:30 ACDT		Report	Perre 78'	Stadium: Adelaide Shores Football Centre

16 November 2014	Sydney FC Youth	5–2	FFA Centre of Excellence	Sydney
17:00 AEDT	Blackwood 18', 76'; Antoniou 33'; Andrew 45'; Araujo 80'	Report	Reiners 13' (pen.); Kim 85'	Stadium: Lambert Park; Referee: Brenton Kopra

=== Round 6 ===
22 November 2014	FFA Centre of Excellence	0–4	Adelaide United Youth	Canberra
10:30 AEDT		Report	Costa (?); D. Smith (?); Altundag (?); Maiolo (?)	Stadium: Australian Institute of Sport

23 November 2014	Brisbane Roar Youth	0–2	Perth Glory Youth	Brisbane
10:00 AEST		Report	Harold 15'; 18' (o.g.)	Stadium: Goodwin Park

23 November 2014	Melbourne City Youth	2–1	Newcastle Jets Youth	Melbourne
14:00 AEDT	Whyte 30' (o.g.); Dekker 39'	Report	Lundy 85'	Stadium: Lower Playing Fields, La Trobe University

23 November 2014	Melbourne Victory Youth	3–2	Sydney FC Youth	Melbourne
16:00 AEDT	Nabbout 8' (pen.), 74'; Howard 77'	Report	Tratt 3'; Gligor 61'	Stadium: Lakeside Stadium; Referee: James Sherry

23 November 2014	Western Sydney Wanderers Youth	2–1	Central Coast Mariners Youth	Sydney
16:00 AEDT	(?) (?)	Report	Kalik (?)	Stadium: Blacktown International Sportspark

=== Round 7 ===
29 November 2014	Newcastle Jets Youth	2–3	Central Coast Mariners Youth	Weston
11:00 AEDT	Pavicevic 21'; Lundy 39'	Report	Perre 52' (pen.); Kalik 68'; Versi 90+1'	Stadium: Rockwell Automation Park; Referee: Trent Nash

29 November 2014	Melbourne City Youth	4–2	Adelaide United Youth	Melbourne
15:00 AEDT	Dekker 45', 48'; Espindola 55'; Retre 68'	Report	D. Smith 75'; Tongyik 82'	Stadium: Lower Playing Fields, La Trobe University

30 November 2014	Perth Glory Youth	2–1	Melbourne Victory Youth	Perth
11:00 AWST		Report		Stadium: Ashfield Sports Club

30 November 2014	Brisbane Roar Youth	3–2	Sydney FC Youth	Brisbane
14:30 AEST	Clut 3'; Sibatuara 70'; Yango 72'	Report	Muata-Marlow 14'; Lokoli-Ngoy 87'	Stadium: Dunmore Park

27 January 2015	Western Sydney Wanderers Youth	1–2	FFA Centre of Excellence	Campbelltown
16:00 AEDT				Stadium: Campbelltown Stadium

=== Round 8 ===
6 December 2014	Sydney FC Youth	1–1	Perth Glory Youth	Sydney
11:00 AEDT	Tsekenis 36'	Report	Harold 90'	Stadium: Lambert Park

6 December 2014	Central Coast Mariners Youth	5–1	Melbourne Victory Youth	Tuggerah
14:30 AEDT	McGing 26', 60', 70'; Bingham 52'; Buhagiar 80'	Report	Cristaldo 34'	Stadium: Central Coast Mariners Centre of Excellence

6 December 2014	Western Sydney Wanderers Youth	2–0	Melbourne City Youth	Sydney
16:00 AEDT				Stadium: Sportingbet Stadium

7 December 2014	FFA Centre of Excellence	0–2	Brisbane Roar Youth	Canberra
14:00 AEDT			Clut 10'; S. O'Neill 65'	Stadium: Australian Institute of Sport

7 December 2014	Adelaide United Youth	1–0	Newcastle Jets Youth	Adelaide
14:00 AEDT	Costa 10'	Report		Stadium: Adelaide Shores Football Centre; Attendance: 160

=== Round 9 ===
13 December 2014	FFA Centre of Excellence	0–1	Melbourne Victory Youth	Canberra
13:00 AEDT			Howard 14'	Stadium: Australian Institute of Sport

14 December 2014	Brisbane Roar Youth	3–4	Newcastle Jets Youth	Brisbane
11:00 AEDT	Hore 22'; Yango 24'; Theodore 62'	Report	Lundy 17' (pen.), 40'; Welsh 45'; Crowley 55'	Stadium: Dunmore Park

14 December 2014	Perth Glory Youth	5–3	Central Coast Mariners Youth	Perth
11:00 AWST	Harold 1', 55'; 11' (o.g.); Knowles 60', 66'	Report	Kalik 34' (pen.); Perre 63'; Buhagiar 80'	Stadium: Ashfield Sports Club

14 December 2014	Adelaide United Youth	2–0	Western Sydney Wanderers Youth	Adelaide
15:00 AEDT	Altundag 12' (pen.); Konstandopoulos 34'	Report		Stadium: Adelaide Shores Football Centre; Attendance: 280

14 December 2014	Sydney FC Youth	3–3	Melbourne City Youth	Sydney
15:00 AEDT	Blackwood 40' (pen.), 90+3'; Lokoli-Ngoy 90+5'	Report	Petreski 1'; Rizk 36' (red card) 38'; Espindola 46'; Stevanja (yellow card) ?' (yellow-red card) 76'	Stadium: Lambert Park

=== Round 10 ===
20 December 2014	Sydney FC Youth	1–1	Adelaide United Youth	Sydney
15:00 AEDT	Tsekenis (?)	Report	Costa (?)	Stadium: Lambert Park

20 December 2014	Brisbane Roar Youth	2–1	Melbourne Victory Youth	Brisbane
14:30 AEST	Sibatuara 18', 90+3'	Report	Howard 69'	Stadium: Dunmore Park; Referee: Dylan Lambert

21 December 2014	Melbourne City Youth	2–1	Perth Glory Youth	Melbourne
11:00 AEDT	Espindola 20', 54'	Report	Sam 24'	Stadium: Lower Playing Fields, La Trobe University

21 December 2014	Newcastle Jets Youth	1–0	FFA Centre of Excellence	Weston
11:00 AEDT	Crowley 88'		? (yellow card) 90+4' (yellow-red card)	Stadium: Rockwell Automation Park

21 December 2014	Central Coast Mariners Youth	2–3	Western Sydney Wanderers Youth	Tuggerah
15:00 AEDT	Kalik 80'; McGing 90+2'	Report	Appiah 50'; Trajkovski 71'; Aspropotamitis 75'	Stadium: Central Coast Mariners Centre of Excellence

=== Round 11 ===
17 December 2014	Central Coast Mariners Youth	6–0	FFA Centre of Excellence	Tuggerah
16:00 AEDT	Kalik 25', 56'; Bingham 27'; McGing 30'; Perre 41'; Morton 63'	Report		Stadium: Central Coast Mariners Centre of Excellence

26 December 2014	Western Sydney Wanderers Youth	1–2	Sydney FC Youth	Sydney
16:00 AEDT	Trajkovski 59'	Report	Tsekenis 8'; Blackwood 84'	Stadium: Blacktown International Sportspark

27 December 2014	Melbourne Victory Youth	4–1	Newcastle Jets Youth	Melbourne
15:30 AEDT	Nabbout 8'; Howard 13', 67'; Cristaldo 27' (pen.)	Report	Finlayson (red card) 27'; Pavicevic 72' (pen.) ? (red card) 88'	Stadium: AAMI Park; Attendance: 2,371

28 December 2014	Perth Glory Youth	0–0	Adelaide United Youth	Perth
11:00 AWST		Report		Stadium: Ashfield Sports Club; Referee: Matthew Southern

28 December 2014	Melbourne City Youth	3–2	Brisbane Roar Youth	Melbourne
15:00 AEDT	Rizk 6'; Dekker 32', 71'	Report	Brady 14', 88'	Stadium: Lower Playing Fields, La Trobe University

=== Round 12 ===
3 January 2015	Central Coast Mariners Youth	4–3	Melbourne City Youth	Tuggerah
14:30 AEDT	Beumie 5'; Kalik 27' (pen.), 84'; Bingham 52'		Dekker 71'; Prelavic 77', 90'	Stadium: Central Coast Mariners Centre of Excellence

4 January 2015	Adelaide United Youth	3–0	Melbourne Victory Youth	Adelaide
11:30 AEDT	Warland 43'; Costa 51'; Konstandopoulos 59'	Report		Stadium: Adelaide Shores Football Centre; Attendance: 317

4 January 2015	Western Sydney Wanderers Youth	0–2	Newcastle Jets Youth	Sydney
16:00 AEDT				Stadium: Blacktown International Sportspark

4 January 2015	Sydney FC Youth	0–1	Brisbane Roar Youth	Sydney
17:00 AEDT		Report	Litfin 4'	Stadium: Lambert Park

4 February 2015	FFA Centre of Excellence	1–2	Perth Glory Youth	Canberra
15:00 AEDT	H. Davies 40'; Arzani (red card) 79'	Report	Sam 29'; Spaseski 90+2'	Stadium: Australian Institute of Sport; Referee: Adrian Arndt

=== Round 13 ===
24 January 2015	Melbourne City Youth	2–1	Sydney FC Youth	Ballarat
15:00 AEDT	Dekker 60'; Espindola 90+3' (pen.)	Report	Lokoli-Ngoy 73'	Stadium: Morshead Park

25 January 2015	Newcastle Jets Youth	2–0	Perth Glory Youth	Weston
11:00 AEDT	Crowley 39'; Papadimitrios 44'			Stadium: Rockwell Automation Park

25 January 2015	Adelaide United Youth	4–0	FFA Centre of Excellence	Adelaide
11:00 ACDT	Trimboli 44', 70'; D. Smith 63', 73'	Report		Stadium: Adelaide Shores Football Centre

25 January 2015	Melbourne Victory Youth	3–2	Central Coast Mariners Youth	Melbourne
15:00 AEDT	Nabout 10', 60'; Howard 23'; Cristaldo (red card) 80'		Buhagiar 65'; Jamba 72'	Stadium: Lakeside Stadium

11 February 2015	Brisbane Roar Youth	1–1	Western Sydney Wanderers Youth	Brisbane
14:00 AEST	Danning 71'	Report	Youlley 10'	Stadium: Perry Park

=== Round 14 ===
1 February 2015	FFA Centre of Excellence	0–3	Melbourne City Youth	Canberra
12:00 AEDT				Stadium: Australian Institute of Sport

1 February 2015	Perth Glory Youth	1–1	Sydney FC Youth	Perth
11:00 AWST	B. O'Niell 15'	Report	Tratt 2'	Stadium: Ashfield Sports Club

1 February 2015	Central Coast Mariners Youth	3–1	Newcastle Jets Youth	Tuggerah
15:00 AEDT	De Godoy 33' (o.g.); Kalik 51'; M. Bosnar 80'	Report	Ensor 24'	Stadium: Central Coast Mariners Centre of Excellence

1 February 2015	Melbourne Victory Youth	3–0	Western Sydney Wanderers Youth	Melbourne
15:00 AEDT	Makarounas 12', 52'; Pain 44'	Report		Stadium: Lakeside Stadium

1 February 2015	Adelaide United Youth	4–3	Brisbane Roar Youth	Adelaide
15:00 ACDT	Kamau 47'; Zafridis 57'; D. Smith 75'; Costa 90+3'	Report	D'Agostino 14'; Brady 33'; 90'	Stadium: Adelaide Shores Football Centre

=== Round 15 ===
6 February 2015	Western Sydney Wanderers Youth	1–2	Perth Glory Youth	Sydney
11:00 AEDT	Maia 30'	Report	Costello 43'; Vulin 84' (pen.)	Stadium: Marconi Stadium

7 February 2015	Brisbane Roar Youth	5–1	Central Coast Mariners Youth	Brisbane
15:00 AEST	Clut 25' (pen.), 81'; Kaluđerović 33'; Brady 62'; Dais 76'	Report	Curran 2'	Stadium: Perry Park

8 February 2015	Newcastle Jets Youth	2–1	Adelaide United Youth	Newcastle
10:30 AEDT	Crowley 42'; Waller 80'	Report	19'	Stadium: Magic Park

8 February 2015	FFA Centre of Excellence	1–3	Sydney FC Youth	Canberra
15:00 AEDT	Petratos 75'	Report	Blackwood 4'; Zuvela 12'; Andrew 43'	Stadium: Australian Institute of Sport

8 February 2015	Melbourne City Youth	2–2	Melbourne Victory Youth	Melbourne
15:00 AEDT	Prelevic 9'; Rizk 68'	Report	Makarounas 81', 84'	Stadium: Epping Stadium

=== Round 16 ===
14 February 2015	Central Coast Mariners Youth	2–1	Adelaide United Youth	Tuggerah
11:00 AEDT	Bingham 33', 48' (pen.); Pandurevic (yellow card) ?' (yellow-red card) 89'	Report	Costa 3'	Stadium: Central Coast Mariners Centre of Excellence

14 February 2015	Perth Glory Youth	2–2	Melbourne City Youth	Perth
11:00 AWST	Sam 45'; Vulin 49'; Oxborrow (yellow card) 22' (yellow-red card) 79'	Report	Dekker 18'; Efe 30'	Stadium: Ashfield Sports Club; Referee: Nico Hoyle

15 February 2015	Brisbane Roar Youth	6–0	FFA Centre of Excellence	Brisbane
11:00 AEST	Clut 2', 58'; Schmidt 21'; Lambadaridis 43'; Theodore 85'; D'Agostino 87'	Report		Stadium: Perry Park

15 February 2015	Newcastle Jets Youth	2–1	Western Sydney Wanderers Youth	Newcastle
15:00 AEDT	Welsh 3'; De Godoy 44'	Report	Darko 77'	Stadium: Magic Park

15 February 2015	Sydney FC Youth	3–1	Melbourne Victory Youth	Sydney
16:00 AEDT	Tsekenis 5'; Gligor 12'; Tomelic 59'	Report	Cristaldo 48'	Stadium: Lambert Park

=== Round 17 ===
21 February 2015	Western Sydney Wanderers Youth	2–3	Brisbane Roar Youth	Sydney
14:30 AEDT				Stadium: Popondetta Park

21 February 2015	Melbourne City Youth	2–0	Central Coast Mariners Youth	Melbourne
15:00 AEDT	Ramsay 39'; Espindola 41'	Report		Stadium: Epping Stadium

22 February 2015	Adelaide United Youth	1–2	Perth Glory Youth	Adelaide
10:00 ACDT	D. Smith 85'	Report	Knowles (?); O’Brien 42'	Stadium: Adelaide Shores Football Centre

22 February 2015	Melbourne Victory Youth	2–1	FFA Centre of Excellence	Melbourne
14:30 AEDT				Stadium: Lakeside Stadium

22 February 2015	Sydney FC Youth	6–1	Newcastle Jets Youth	Sydney
17:00 AEDT	Blackwood 5', 44'; Burgess 22'; Tsekenis (?); Stambolziev 68'; Lokoli-Ngoy 90'	Report	Crowley 24'	Stadium: Lambert Park

=== Round 18 ===
27 February 2015	FFA Centre of Excellence	0–0	Western Sydney Wanderers Youth	Canberra
16:00 AEDT		Report		Stadium: Australian Institute of Sport

1 March 2015	Newcastle Jets Youth	2–2	Melbourne City Youth	Newcastle
12:30 AEDT	Germano 4' (o.g.); 88'	Report	Zinni 2'; Germano 52'	Stadium: Magic Park

1 March 2015	Melbourne Victory Youth	5–1	Adelaide United Youth	Melbourne
14:00 AEDT				Stadium: AAMI Park

1 March 2015	Perth Glory Youth	1–2	Brisbane Roar Youth	Perth
11:00 AWST	Oxborrow 13'	Report	Bowles 29'; Clut 48'	Stadium: Ashfield Sports Club; Referee: Nico Hoyle

1 March 2015	Central Coast Mariners Youth	3–2	Sydney FC Youth	Tuggerah
16:00 AEDT	Major 1', 36'; Sim 55'	Report	Andrew 46', 57'	Stadium: Central Coast Mariners Centre of Excellence

== Table of results ==
Home \ Away	ADE	BRI	CCM	FFA	MCY	MVC	NEW	PER	SYD	WSW
Adelaide United		4–3	0–1	4–0	3–1	3–0	1–0	1–2	0–4	2–0
Brisbane Roar	1–0		5–1	6–0	0–3	2–1	3–4	0–2	3–2	1–1
Central Coast Mariners	2–1	0–0		6–0	4–3	5–1	3–1	1–2	3–2	2–3
FFA Centre of Excellence	0–4	0–2	1–1		0–3	0–1	0–5	1–2	1–3	0–0
Melbourne City	4–2	3–2	2–0	2–1		2–2	2–1	2–1	2–1	4–1
Melbourne Victory	5–1	1–2	3–2	2–1	0–0		4–1	3–1	3–2	3–0
Newcastle Jets	2–1	0–2	2–3	1–0	2–2	3–3		2–0	2–3	2–1
Perth Glory	0–0	1–2	5–3	3–2	2–2	2–1	3–0		1–1	3–1
Sydney FC	1–1	0–1	1–0	5–2	3–3	3–1	6–1	1–1		0–1
Western Sydney Wanderers	1–0	2–3	2–1	1–2	2–0	3–0	0–2	1–2	1–2	

Legend: Blue = home team win; Yellow = draw; Red = away team win.

== Season statistics ==
=== Goals scored ===
Regular season
Club	Goals	Average
Central Coast Mariners Youth	29	2.23
Melbourne City Youth	29	2.23
Perth Glory Youth	23	1.92
Sydney FC Youth	22	1.83
Newcastle Jets Youth	21	1.75
Melbourne Victory Youth	21	1.62
Brisbane Roar Youth	18	1.5
Adelaide United Youth	20	1.54
Western Sydney Wanderers Youth	15	1.25
FFA Centre of Excellence	6	0.6

=== Clean sheets ===
Regular season
Club	Clean Sheets
Adelaide United Youth	6
Brisbane Roar Youth	5
Newcastle Jets Youth	4
Western Sydney Wanderers Youth	4
Perth Glory Youth	3
Central Coast Mariners Youth	3
Brisbane Roar Youth	5
Melbourne Victory Youth	2
Sydney FC Youth	2
Melbourne City Youth	2
FFA Centre of Excellence	0

== End-of-season awards ==
George Blackwood of Sydney FC Youth and Liam Youlley of Western Sydney Wanderers FC Youth were voted co-winners of the Foxtel National Youth League Player of the Year Award while Brisbane Roar FC Youth was selected as the winner of the Foxtel National Youth League Fair Play Award.
