= 2015–16 National Youth League (Australia) =

National Youth League
- Season: 2015–16
- Champions: Sydney FC Youth (3rd title)
- Matches: 40
- Goals: 183 (4.58 per match)
- Best Player: Dylan Smith
- Top goalscorer: Joey Katebian (10 goals)
- Biggest home win: Brisbane Roar Youth 10–0 Adelaide United Youth (19 December 2015)
- Biggest away win: Melbourne Victory Youth 1–5 Brisbane Roar Youth (15 January 2016)
- Highest scoring: Brisbane Roar Youth 10–0 Adelaide United Youth (19 December 2015)
- Longest winning run: Adelaide United Youth, Melbourne Victory Youth, Newcastle Jets Youth, Sydney FC Youth (3 games)
- Longest unbeaten run: Adelaide United Youth, Melbourne Victory Youth, Newcastle Jets Youth, Sydney FC Youth (3 games)
- Longest winless run: FFA Centre of Excellence (7 games)
- Longest losing run: FFA Centre of Excellence (7 games)

The 2015–16 National Youth League (Also known as the Foxtel National Youth League for sponsorship reasons) was the eighth season of the Australian National Youth League competition. The season ran in a different, reduced format to previous years, and in parallel with the 2015–16 A-League season.

== Teams ==

Team	Home city	Home ground
Adelaide United Youth	Adelaide	Elite Systems Football Centre
Brisbane Roar Youth	Brisbane	Cleveland Showgrounds
Central Coast Mariners Academy	Gosford	Central Coast Mariners Centre of Excellence
FFA Centre of Excellence	Canberra	Australian Institute of Sport
Melbourne City Youth	Melbourne	CB Smith Reserve
Melbourne Victory Youth	Melbourne	Lakeside Stadium
Newcastle Jets Youth	Newcastle	Magic Park
Perth Glory Youth	Perth	Ashfield Reserve
Sydney FC Youth	Sydney	Lambert Park
Western Sydney Wanderers Youth	Sydney	Popondetta Park / Blacktown International Sportspark

== Format ==
This season was run with a new format. From 2016, all A-League clubs now have youth teams entered into their local conferences of the National Premier Leagues. By having NPL teams, there is now less reliance on the NYL to provide an avenue for youth players to their respective clubs. There was also pressure from A-League clubs to reduce travel budgets. As such the season was shortened from 18 games per team to 8 games plus a Grand Final. The existing ten NYL teams were divided into two conferences of five teams: Conference A consisted of teams from WA, SA, Victoria and Queensland, while teams from ACT and NSW were in Conference B. All teams played all other teams in their conference on a home and away basis. After the home and away series a Grand Final was played between the top teams from each conference.

== Standings ==
Conference A
Pos	Team	Pld	W	D	L	GF	GA	GD	Pts	Qualification
1	Adelaide United Youth	8	6	0	2	17	18	−1	18	Qualification to the Grand Final
2	Brisbane Roar Youth	8	5	0	3	28	10	+18	15	
3	Melbourne City Youth	8	3	1	4	18	23	−5	10	
4	Melbourne Victory Youth	8	3	0	5	17	22	−5	9	
5	Perth Glory Youth	8	2	1	5	8	15	−7	7	

Source: Foxtel National Youth League

Conference B
Pos	Team	Pld	W	D	L	GF	GA	GD	Pts	Qualification
1	Sydney FC Youth (C)	8	6	0	2	21	11	+10	18	Qualification to the Grand Final
2	Newcastle Jets Youth	8	5	1	2	17	12	+5	16	
3	Western Sydney Wanderers Youth	8	4	1	3	20	25	−5	13	
4	Central Coast Mariners Academy	8	3	0	5	24	22	+2	9	
5	FFA Centre of Excellence	8	1	0	7	13	25	−12	3	

Source: Foxtel National Youth League
(C) Champions

== Results ==
Conference A
Home \ Away	ADE	BRI	MCY	MVC	PER
Adelaide United Youth		1–0	3–1	4–2	2–1
Brisbane Roar Youth	10–0		5–2	3–1	0–1
Melbourne City Youth	3–2	4–3		2–1	1–1
Melbourne Victory Youth	1–2	1–5	5–4		3–0
Perth Glory Youth	0–3	0–2	3–1	2–3	

Legend: Blue = home team win; Yellow = draw; Red = away team win.

Conference B
Home \ Away	CCM	FFA	NEW	SYD	WSW
Central Coast Mariners Academy		5–3	2–3	1–2	7–2
FFA Centre of Excellence	1–4		4–3	0–1	2–5
Newcastle Jets Youth	3–0	1–0		1–0	3–3
Sydney FC Youth	5–3	3–2	1–2		5–0
Western Sydney Wanderers Youth	3–2	3–1	2–1	2–4	

Legend: Blue = home team win; Yellow = draw; Red = away team win.

=== Positions by round ===
Conference A
Team ╲ Round	1	2	3	4	5	6	7	8	9	10
Adelaide United Youth	1	2	3	2	1	1	1	1	1	1
Brisbane Roar Youth	2	1	1	1	3	4	3	3	2	2
Melbourne City Youth	3	3	2	4	2	3	2	2	3	3
Melbourne Victory Youth	4	5	4	3	4	2	4	4	4	4
Perth Glory Youth	5	4	5	5	5	5	5	5	5	5

Conference B
Team ╲ Round	1	2	3	4	5	6	7	8	9	10
Sydney FC Youth	1	3	1	1	1	2	1	1	1	1
Newcastle Jets Youth	2	4	5	2	2	1	2	2	2	2
Western Sydney Wanderers Youth	2	1	2	3	3	3	4	3	3	3
Central Coast Mariners Academy	5	5	3	4	4	4	3	4	4	4
FFA Centre of Excellence	4	2	4	5	5	5	5	5	5	5

== Group stage ==
=== Conference A ===
Round 1

7 November 2015	Perth Glory Youth	0–2	Brisbane Roar Youth	Perth
10:30 AWST		Report	D'Agostino 11', 55'	Stadium: Ashfield Reserve; Referee: Tom Dowle

7 November 2015	Adelaide United Youth	4–2	Melbourne Victory Youth	Adelaide
15:00 ACDT	D. Smith 15', 22', 89'; Trimboli 40'	Report	Katebian 37', 45'	Stadium: Elite Systems Football Centre

Round 2

13 November 2015	Melbourne City Youth	1–1	Perth Glory Youth	Melbourne
	Cristaldo 3'	Report	Vulin 49'	Stadium: CB Smith Reserve; Referee: Adam Bavcar

13 November 2015	Brisbane Roar Youth	3–1	Melbourne Victory Youth	Brisbane
	D. Ingham 31'; Daley 35'; H. Sawyer 71' (pen.)	Report	Katebian 67'	Stadium: Cleveland Showgrounds; Referee: Alan Milliner

Round 3

22 November 2015	Melbourne City Youth	3–2	Adelaide United Youth	Melbourne
12:00 AEDT	Zinni 6'; Kuzmanovski 20'; Espindola 47'	Report	Altundag 68'; Smith 70'	Stadium: CB Smith Reserve

22 November 2015	Melbourne Victory Youth	3–0	Perth Glory Youth	Melbourne
16:00 AEDT	Whitney 14' (o.g.); Katebian 45'; Makarounas 57'	Report		Stadium: Lakeside Stadium

Round 4

29 November 2015	Adelaide United Youth	1–0	Brisbane Roar Youth	Adelaide
10:00 ACDT	Trimboli 22'	Report		Stadium: Elite Systems Football Centre

29 November 2015	Melbourne Victory Youth	5–4	Melbourne City Youth	Melbourne
16:00 AEDT	Pain 36', 46'; Katebian 38', 90+1'; Dover 45+2'	Report	Garuccio 53'; Dekker 72'; Cristaldo 82' (pen.), 90+3' (pen.)	Stadium: Lakeside Stadium

Round 5

5 December 2015	Perth Glory Youth	0–3	Adelaide United Youth	Perth
10:30 AWST		Report	Trimboli 30'; D. Smith 69', 76'	Stadium: Ashfield Reserve; Referee: Zach Piccicacco

5 December 2015	Melbourne City Youth	4–3	Brisbane Roar Youth	Melbourne
16:00 AEDT	Dekker 3', 47', 63'; Espindola 41'	Report	D'Agostino 18', 50'; Fadljevic 38' (o.g.)	Stadium: CB Smith Reserve

Round 6

12 December 2015	Adelaide United Youth	3–1	Melbourne City Youth	Adelaide
10:30 ACDT	O'Doherty 53'; Trimboli 63', 75'	Report	Gallo 60'	Stadium: Elite Systems Football Centre

13 December 2015	Perth Glory Youth	2–3	Melbourne Victory Youth	Perth
10:30 AWST	Oxborrow 35'; Valentini 45'	Report	Nigro 18'; Katebian 20', 21'	Stadium: Ashfield Reserve

Round 7

19 December 2015	Brisbane Roar Youth	10–0	Adelaide United Youth	Brisbane
10:30 AEST	Clut 11' (pen.), 32', 50' (pen.); H. Sawyer 13', 25', 65', 67', 83'; Daley 54'; D'Agostino 82' (pen.)	Report	Warland (red card) 75'	Stadium: Cleveland Showgrounds; Referee: Matthew Male

20 December 2015	Melbourne City Youth	2–1	Melbourne Victory Youth	Melbourne
13:00 AEDT	Cristaldo 7'; N. Gonzalez 87'	Report	Katebian 55'	Stadium: CB Smith Reserve

Round 8

2 January 2016	Melbourne Victory Youth	1–2	Adelaide United Youth	Melbourne
16:00 AEDT	Katebian 55' (pen.)	Report	D. Smith 53'; O'Doherty 82'	Stadium: Lakeside Stadium

3 January 2016	Brisbane Roar Youth	0–1	Perth Glory Youth	Brisbane
10:30 AEST		Report	Talimdzioski 64'	Stadium: Cleveland Showgrounds; Referee: Daniel Olson

Round 9

9 January 2016	Brisbane Roar Youth	5–2	Melbourne City Youth	Brisbane
16:00 AEST	Wenzel-Halls 19'; Champness (red card) 28'; D. Ingham 32'; Leck 87', 90+1'; Prasad 90+3'	Report	Zinni 64', 90+2'	Stadium: Cleveland Showgrounds; Referee: Matthew Male

10 January 2016	Adelaide United Youth	2–1	Perth Glory Youth	Adelaide
09:45 ACDT	McGree 5'; O'Doherty 16'	Report	Teece 33'	Stadium: Elite Systems Football Centre

Round 10

15 January 2016	Melbourne Victory Youth	1–5	Brisbane Roar Youth	Melbourne
16:30 AEDT	Maclean 45'	Report	D. Ingham 2'; Daley 66'; D'Agostino 80', 88'; Hore 90+2'	Stadium: AAMI Park

17 January 2016	Perth Glory Youth	3–1	Melbourne City Youth	Perth
10:30 AWST	Knowles 46', 83'; Stynes 81'	Report	Kuzmanovski 17'; Athanasiou (yellow card) 65' (yellow-red card) 90'	Stadium: Ashfield Reserve; Referee: Tom Dowie

=== Conference B ===
Round 1

7 November 2015	Central Coast Mariners Academy	1–2	Sydney FC Youth	Gosford
16:00 AEDT	Wales 47'	Report	Calver 32'; Lokoli-Ngoy 38'	Stadium: Central Coast Mariners Centre of Excellence

8 November 2015	Newcastle Jets Youth	3–3	Western Sydney Wanderers Youth	Newcastle
10:00 AEDT	Cowburn 7'; Lundy 51', 90+3'	Report	Scott 39', 41'; Maia 58'	Stadium: Magic Park; Referee: Alex Merkel

Round 2

15 November 2015	FFA Centre of Excellence	4–3	Newcastle Jets Youth	Canberra
	Panetta 56', 58', 62'; Dimitroff 90+6' (pen.)	Report	Brymora 8'; Crowley 43', 90+3'	Stadium: AIS Grass Fields; Referee: Samuel Grasso

15 November 2015	Western Sydney Wanderers Youth	3–2	Central Coast Mariners Academy	Sydney
10:30 AEDT	Scott 3'; Shabow 26'; Maia 57'; Baccus (yellow card) ?' (yellow-red card) 90+2'	Report	Buhagiar 28'; Berry 48'	Stadium: Marconi Stadium

Round 3

22 November 2015	Central Coast Mariners Academy	5–3	FFA Centre of Excellence	Gosford
10:30 AEDT	Heffernan 2', 13', 64'; Duncan 39'; Buhagiar 71'	Report	Joice 1'; Arzani 33', 44'	Stadium: Central Coast Mariners Centre of Excellence

22 November 2015	Sydney FC Youth	5–0	Western Sydney Wanderers Youth	Sydney
19:00 AEDT	Burgess 24', 48', 80' (pen.); Zuvela 60'; Lokoli-Ngoy 83'	Report	Youlley (yellow card) 63' (yellow-red card) 67'	Stadium: Lambert Park; Referee: Tim Danaskos

Round 4

28 November 2015	FFA Centre of Excellence	0–1	Sydney FC Youth	Canberra
16:00 AEDT		Report	Blackwood 35'	Stadium: AIS Grass Fields

29 November 2015	Newcastle Jets Youth	3–0	Central Coast Mariners Academy	Newcastle
10:00 AEDT	Cooper 3'; Lundy 71' (pen.); Barresi 73'	Report		Stadium: Magic Park; Referee: Adam Vanauskas

Round 5

6 December 2015	Western Sydney Wanderers Youth	3–1	FFA Centre of Excellence	Sydney
16:00 AEDT	Shabow 3'; Alessi 22', 27'; Gaspari (yellow card) 62' (yellow-red card) 64'	Report	83'	Stadium: Blacktown International Sportspark

6 December 2015	Sydney FC Youth	1–2	Newcastle Jets Youth	Sydney
19:00 AEDT	Naumoff 8'	Report	Lundy 16'; Carroll 44'	Stadium: Lambert Park

Round 6

12 December 2015	Newcastle Jets Youth	1–0	FFA Centre of Excellence	Newcastle
16:00 AEDT	Brymora 15'	Report		Stadium: Magic Park

13 December 2015	Central Coast Mariners Academy	7–2	Western Sydney Wanderers Youth	Gosford
16:00 AEDT	Peterson 24' (pen.), 66', 84'; Heffernan 29'; Buhagiar 38'; Whyte 48'; McFarlane 73'	Report	Abou Serhal 41'; Shabow 59'	Stadium: Central Coast Mariners Centre of Excellence

Round 7

19 December 2015	FFA Centre of Excellence	1–4	Central Coast Mariners Academy	Canberra
17:00 AEDT	Hope 81'	Report	Kalik 8'; Buhagiar 28', 50'; Duncan 62'	Stadium: AIS Grass Fields

20 December 2015	Western Sydney Wanderers Youth	2–4	Sydney FC Youth	Sydney
17:00 AEDT	Macdonald 52', 57'	Report	A. Mullen 17'; Fox 45+1' (o.g.); Spyrakis 48'; Stambolziev 84'	Stadium: Popondetta Park

Round 8

2 January 2016	Western Sydney Wanderers Youth	2–1	Newcastle Jets Youth	Sydney
16:00 AEDT	Scott 48' (?)	Report	Parris (?)	Stadium: Popondetta Park

3 January 2016	Sydney FC Youth	5–3	Central Coast Mariners Academy	Sydney
17:00 AEDT	Stambolziev 41'; Abbas 45+1'; Antoniou 48'; C. Gonzalez 80'; Zuvela 81'	Report	Fitzgerald 27'; Kalik 64'; G. Trifiro 70' (pen.)	Stadium: Lambert Park

Round 9

9 January 2016	FFA Centre of Excellence	2–5	Western Sydney Wanderers Youth	Canberra
16:00 AEDT	Davies (red card) 8'; Hope 10'; Devereux 45'	Report	Cole 9'; Alessi 21'; Macdonald 49', 68', 78'	Stadium: AIS Grass Fields

10 January 2016	Newcastle Jets Youth	1–0	Sydney FC Youth	Newcastle
16:00 AEDT	Brennan 4'	Report		Stadium: Magic Park

Round 10

16 January 2016	Central Coast Mariners Academy	2–3	Newcastle Jets Youth	Gosford
10:30 AEDT	Kalik 24'; Le May 28'	Report	Parris 14'; Barresi 33', 34'	Stadium: Central Coast Mariners Centre of Excellence

17 January 2016	Sydney FC Youth	3–2	FFA Centre of Excellence	Sydney
17:00 AEDT	E. Gonzalez 18'; Antoniou 40', 86'	Report	Devereux 31'; Tokich 78'	Stadium: Lambert Park

== Grand Final ==
23 January 2016	Adelaide United Youth	2–5	Sydney FC Youth	Gosford
16:00 AEDT	Tratt 32' (o.g.); Altundag 61'	Report	A. Mullen 12', 49'; Zuvela 23'; Burgess 40'; C. Gonzalez 56'	Stadium: Central Coast Stadium; Referee: Lachlan Keevers
