= 2017–18 Y-League =

Y-League
- Season: 2017–18
- Champions: Western Sydney Wanderers U21 (1st title)
- Matches: 40
- Goals: 181 (4.53 per match)
- Best Player: Louis D'Arrigo
- Top goalscorer: Abraham Majok (9 goals)

The 2017–18 Y-League (also known as the Foxtel Y-League for sponsorship reasons) was the tenth season of the Australian Y-League competition.

== Teams ==

In April 2017, the closing of the FFA Centre of Excellence (previously the Australian Institute of Sport Football Program) was announced. They were replaced by Canberra United, who were granted a National Youth League licence.

Team	Home city	Home ground
Adelaide United Youth	Adelaide	Marden Sports Complex
Brisbane Roar Youth	Brisbane	Lanham Park
Central Coast Mariners Academy	Gosford	Central Coast Mariners Centre of Excellence
Canberra United Youth	Canberra	Australian Institute of Sport
Melbourne City Youth	Melbourne	CB Smith Reserve
Melbourne Victory Youth	Melbourne	Epping Stadium
Newcastle Jets Youth	Newcastle	Newcastle No.2 Sportsground
Perth Glory Youth	Perth	Dorrien Gardens
Sydney FC Youth	Sydney	Lambert Park
Western Sydney Wanderers Youth	Sydney	Marconi Stadium / Popondetta Park

== Format ==
The 2017–18 season was structured with the same format as the previous two seasons, with the existing ten NYL teams divided into two conferences of five teams: Conference A consists of teams from WA, SA, Victoria and Queensland, while teams from ACT and NSW are in Conference B. Teams in each conference played each other on a home and away basis, followed by a Grand Final between the top team from each conference.

== Standings ==
Conference A
Pos	Team	Pld	W	D	L	GF	GA	GD	Pts	Qualification
1	Melbourne City Youth	8	5	1	2	24	12	+12	16	Qualification to the Grand Final
2	Melbourne Victory Youth	8	4	1	3	17	25	−8	13	
3	Adelaide United Youth	8	3	2	3	20	15	+5	11	
4	Perth Glory Youth	8	3	1	4	14	14	0	10	
5	Brisbane Roar Youth	8	2	1	5	11	20	−9	7	

Source: Foxtel National Youth League

Conference B
Pos	Team	Pld	W	D	L	GF	GA	GD	Pts	Qualification
1	Western Sydney Wanderers Youth (C)	8	6	0	2	29	12	+17	18	Qualification to the Grand Final
2	Sydney FC Youth	8	5	2	1	18	9	+9	17	
3	Newcastle Jets Youth	8	3	3	2	19	19	0	12	
4	Central Coast Mariners Academy	8	2	1	5	14	17	−3	7	
5	Canberra United Youth	8	1	0	7	15	38	−23	3	

Source: Foxtel National Youth League
(C) Champions

== Results ==
Conference A
Home \ Away	ADE	BRI	MCY	MVC	PER
Adelaide United Youth		4–1	1–1	3–4	2–2
Brisbane Roar Youth	1–4		0–3	4–1	0–1
Melbourne City Youth	4–3	3–0		9–2	2–1
Melbourne Victory	1–0	3–3	2–1		1–3
Perth Glory Youth	1–3	1–2	3–1	2–3	

Legend: Blue = home team win; Yellow = draw; Red = away team win.

Conference B
Home \ Away	CAN	CCM	NEW	SYD	WSW
Canberra United Youth		3–6	2–3	2–5	3–6
Central Coast Mariners Academy	1–2		2–3	0–1	0–2
Newcastle Jets Youth	6–3	1–1		2–2	0–3
Sydney FC Youth	3–0	3–1	1–1		2–0
Western Sydney Wanderers Youth	8–0	2–3	5–3	3–1	

Legend: Blue = home team win; Yellow = draw; Red = away team win.

=== Positions by round ===
Conference A
Team ╲ Round	1	2	3	4	5	6	7	8	9	10
Melbourne City Youth	1	1	1	1	1	1	1	1	1	1
Melbourne Victory Youth	3	5	5	4	4	4	4	2	2	2
Adelaide United Youth	2	2	3	3	2	2	2	3	3	3
Perth Glory Youth	4	4	4	5	5	5	5	5	4	4
Brisbane Roar Youth	5	3	2	2	3	3	3	4	5	5

Conference B
Team ╲ Round	1	2	3	4	5	6	7	8	9	10
Western Sydney Wanderers Youth	1	1	1	1	1	1	1	1	1	1
Sydney FC Youth	4	3	3	4	4	3	3	2	2	2
Newcastle Jets Youth	2	2	2	2	2	2	2	3	3	3
Central Coast Mariners Academy	2	4	4	3	3	4	4	4	4	4
Canberra United Youth	5	5	5	5	5	5	5	5	5	5

== Group stage ==
=== Conference A ===
Round 1

18 November 2017	Melbourne City Youth	3–0; Awarded	Brisbane Roar Youth	Melbourne
15:30 AEDT	Genreau 3'; Crowley 23'; Najjarine 28'	Report		Stadium: CB Smith Reserve; Referee: Andrew Meimarakis

19 November 2017	Perth Glory Youth	1–3	Adelaide United Youth	Perth
10:30 AWST	Mustafa 72'	Report	Stamatelopoulos 30', 54', 90+2'	Stadium: Dorrien Gardens; Referee: Shane Skinner

Round 2

25 November 2017	Adelaide United Youth	1–1	Melbourne City Youth	Adelaide
16:00 ACDT	Devereux 56'	Report	Crowley 18'	Stadium: Marden Sports Complex; Attendance: 368; Referee: Samuel Kuys

26 November 2017	Brisbane Roar Youth	4–1	Melbourne Victory Youth	Brisbane
10:30 AEST	Gameiro 7', 35'; Leck 62'; Muratovic 72'	Report	Sehavdic 64'	Stadium: Lanham Park; Referee: Ryan Mooney

Round 3

3 December 2017	Perth Glory Youth	1–2	Brisbane Roar Youth	Perth
10:30 AWST	Domfeh 72'	Report	Leck 22'; Bafford 52'	Stadium: Dorrien Gardens; Referee: Shane Skinner

3 December 2017	Melbourne City Youth	9–2	Melbourne Victory Youth	Melbourne
20:00 AEDT	Arzani 25', 55'; Cavallo 30'; Genreau 33'; Crowley 71', 74', 76'; Najjarine 90+1', 90+2'	Report	Carrigan 18'; Said 47'	Stadium: CB Smith Reserve; Attendance: 100; Referee: Luke Camilleri

Round 4

8 December 2017	Melbourne Victory Youth	1–0	Adelaide United Youth	Melbourne
17:00 AEDT	Waring 90+2' (pen.)	Report		Stadium: Etihad Stadium; Referee: Andrew Meimarakis

9 December 2017	Melbourne City Youth	2–1	Perth Glory Youth	Melbourne
10:30 AEDT	Genreau 73'; Delic 77'	Report	Hore 56'	Stadium: CB Smith Reserve; Referee: Luke Camilleri

Round 5

16 December 2017	Brisbane Roar Youth	1–4	Adelaide United Youth	Brisbane
10:30 AEST	De Vere 41'	Report	K. Konstandopoulos 28'; Niyongabire 61', 90+4'; Irabona 64'	Stadium: Lanham Park; Attendance: 263; Referee: Albert Krause

17 December 2017	Perth Glory Youth	2–3	Melbourne Victory Youth	Perth
10:30 AWST	Brimmer 51' (pen.); Hore 53'	Report	Waring 29'; Sette 57'; Sehavdic 60'	Stadium: Dorrien Gardens; Referee: Shane Skinner

Round 6

28 December 2017	Adelaide United Youth	2–2	Perth Glory Youth	Adelaide
10:30 ACDT	Niyongabire 20'; Devereux 67' (pen.)	Report	Chok 55'; Mustafa 72'	Stadium: Marden Sports Complex; Attendance: 420; Referee: Samuel Kuys

29 December 2017	Brisbane Roar Youth	0–3	Melbourne City Youth	Brisbane
16:30 AEST		Report	Pierias 41'; Bates 63'; Derrick 84'	Stadium: Lanham Park; Attendance: 388

Round 7

7 January 2018	Melbourne Victory Youth	3–3	Brisbane Roar Youth	Melbourne
16:00 AEDT	Theoharous 43' (pen.); Hope 77'; Sette 87'	Report	Trewin 18'; Bafford 28'; Martin 39'	Stadium: Epping Stadium; Attendance: 150; Referee: Luke Camilleri

8 January 2018	Melbourne City Youth	4–3	Adelaide United Youth	Melbourne
13:30 AEDT	Crowley 6'; Najjarine 30'; Cook 76' (o.g.); Pierias 81'	Report	Armiento 25'; Devereux 49' (pen.), 70' (pen.)	Stadium: CB Smith Reserve

Round 8

13 January 2018	Adelaide United Youth	3–4	Melbourne Victory Youth	Adelaide
10:30 ACDT	Crout 10'; Beric 17', 90+2'	Report	Waring 28', 35', 37'; Kirdar 31'	Stadium: Marden Sports Complex; Attendance: 210; Referee: Samuel Kuys

13 January 2018	Perth Glory Youth	3–1	Melbourne City Youth	Perth
10:00 AWST	Knowles 5'; Timmins 11'; Stynes 62'	Report	Iannucci 18'	Stadium: Dorrien Gardens; Referee: Shane Skinner

Round 9

19 January 2018	Brisbane Roar Youth	0–1	Perth Glory Youth	Brisbane
10:30 AEST		Report	Annis 82'	Stadium: Lanham Park; Attendance: 220; Referee: Albert Krause

20 January 2018	Melbourne Victory Youth	2–1	Melbourne City Youth	Melbourne
16:00 AEDT	Kirdar 9'; Waring 13'	Report	Najjarine 56'	Stadium: Epping Stadium; Referee: Shane Skinner

Round 10

28 January 2018	Melbourne Victory Youth	1–3	Perth Glory Youth	Melbourne
10:30 AEDT	Theoharous 39' (pen.)	Report	Mustafa 35'; McGilp 37' (o.g.); Annis 73'	Stadium: Epping Stadium; Attendance: 100; Referee: Albert Krause

1 February 2018	Adelaide United Youth	4–1	Brisbane Roar Youth	Adelaide
10:30 ACDT	Beric 4'; Armiento 37'; Niyongabire 53', 64'	Report	C. Aloisi 90+2'	Stadium: Smith Partners Stadium; Attendance: 54; Referee: Samuel Kuys

=== Conference B ===
Round 1

19 November 2017	Western Sydney Wanderers Youth	8–0	Canberra United Youth	Sydney
16:30 AEDT	Adam 9'; Puflett 41', 56' (pen.); Majok 53', 88', 90+2'; Monge 66'; Najjar 80'	Report		Stadium: Marconi Stadium; Referee: Jarryd McFarlane

19 November 2017	Newcastle Jets Youth	1–1	Central Coast Mariners Academy	Newcastle
19:30 AEDT	Clut 37' (pen.)	Report	Powell 72'	Stadium: No.2 Sportsground; Referee: Hassan Jomaa

Round 2

25 November 2017	Central Coast Mariners Academy	0–2	Western Sydney Wanderers Youth	Gosford
10:30 AEDT		Report	Lustica 30', 49'	Stadium: CCM Centre of Excellence; Attendance: 220; Referee: Michael Bailey

26 November 2017	Sydney FC Youth	1–1	Newcastle Jets Youth	Sydney
17:00 AEDT	Cox 37'	Report	K. Petratos 85'	Stadium: Lambert Park; Referee: Alex Twomey

Round 3

1 December 2017	Western Sydney Wanderers Youth	3–1	Sydney FC Youth	Sydney
19:30 AEDT	Majok 45'; Scott 62'; Adam 76'	Report	Cox 8'	Stadium: Marconi Stadium; Referee: Adrian Brett

3 December 2017	Newcastle Jets Youth	6–3	Canberra United Youth	Newcastle
16:30 AEDT	Thurgate 5', 66', 70', 71'; Shabow 15'; O'Connor 62'	Report	Gulevski 28'; Fabrizio 85'; Katsoulis 90+4'	Stadium: No.2 Sportsground; Referee: Joel Ralston

Round 4

8 December 2017	Western Sydney Wanderers Youth	5–3	Newcastle Jets Youth	Sydney
19:00 AEDT	Adam 12'; Tokich 51'; Grozos 70', 83'; Hayes 90+2' (o.g.)	Report	Y. Petratos 5', 37'; Burke-Gilroy 78'	Stadium: Marconi Stadium

9 December 2017	Canberra United Youth	3–6	Central Coast Mariners Academy	Canberra
10:30 AEDT	Strika 12', 30'; Krklec 67'	Report	Paz 1', 51'; Kekeris 24', 85', 90+5'; M'Mombwa 90+2'	Stadium: AIS Grass Fields

Round 5

16 December 2017	Canberra United Youth	3–6	Western Sydney Wanderers Youth	Canberra
16:30 AEDT	Strika 75' (pen.); Barisic 84'; Obst 90+1'	Report	Majok 13', 87'; Scott 27'; Tokich 33'; Grozos 37', 88'	Stadium: AIS Grass Fields; Attendance: 247; Referee: Hassan Jomaa

17 December 2017	Central Coast Mariners Academy	0–1	Sydney FC Youth	Gosford
16:30 AEDT		Report	Cox 65'	Stadium: CCM Centre of Excellence; Attendance: 203; Referee: Jarryd McFarlane

Round 6

29 December 2017	Sydney FC Youth	3–0	Canberra United Youth	Sydney
18:30 AEDT	Zuvela 29', 33'; Jalloh 86'	Report		Stadium: Lambert Park; Referee: Adrian Brett

30 December 2017	Central Coast Mariners Academy	2–3	Newcastle Jets Youth	Gosford
10:30 AEDT	Markovic 31'; Wales 58'	Report	Joice 46'; Parris 89'; Thurgate 90'	Stadium: CCM Centre of Excellence; Attendance: 342

Round 7

6 January 2018	Western Sydney Wanderers Youth	2–3	Central Coast Mariners Academy	Sydney
19:00 AEDT	Adam 27'; Silvera 73'	Report	Nisbet 17'; Kekeris 38'; Paz 83'	Stadium: Popondetta Park; Referee: Hassan Jomaa

7 January 2018	Newcastle Jets Youth	2–2	Sydney FC Youth	Newcastle
19:00 AEDT	Burke-Gilroy 16', 43'	Report	Tilio 71'; Koop 85'	Stadium: No.2 Sportsground; Referee: Joel Ralston

Round 8

13 January 2018	Central Coast Mariners Academy	1–2	Canberra United Youth	Gosford
10:30 AEDT	Paz 58'	Report	Griffiths 45+5'; Timotheou 90+1'	Stadium: CCM Centre of Excellence; Referee: Adrian Brett

13 January 2018	Sydney FC Youth	2–0	Western Sydney Wanderers Youth	Sydney
19:00 AEDT	Tilio 58'; Cox 88'	Report		Stadium: Lambert Park; Referee: Michael Bailey

Round 9

20 January 2018	Canberra United Youth	2–3	Newcastle Jets Youth	Canberra
16:30 AEDT	Katsoulis 88', 90+5'	Report	Harrison 5', 25'; K. Petratos 45+5'	Stadium: McKellar Park; Referee: Adrian Brett

21 January 2018	Sydney FC Youth	3–1	Central Coast Mariners Academy	Sydney
17:00 AEDT	Cox 20'; Zuvela 45+2'; Jalloh 51'	Report	Kekeris 67'	Stadium: Lambert Park; Referee: Alex Twomey

Round 10

27 January 2018	Canberra United Youth	2–5	Sydney FC Youth	Canberra
16:30 AEDT	Katsoulis 33'; Gulevski 59'	Report	Jalloh 5'; Flottmann 7'; McIllhatton 61'; Cox 64'; Ivanovic 90+5'	Stadium: AIS Grass Fields; Attendance: 349; Referee: Alex Twomey

27 January 2018	Newcastle Jets Youth	0–3	Western Sydney Wanderers Youth	Newcastle
16:30 AEDT		Report	Majok 9', 17', 71'	Stadium: No.2 Sportsground; Attendance: 357; Referee: Joel Ralston

== Grand Final ==
3 February 2018	Melbourne City Youth	1–3 (a.e.t.)	Western Sydney Wanderers Youth	Newcastle
14:00 AEDT	Genreau 54' (pen.)	Report	Scott 70'; Tokich 101'; Roberts 111'	Stadium: McDonald Jones Stadium; Referee: Andrew Meimarakis

== Top goalscorers ==
Rank	Player	Club	Goals
1	(Australia) Braedyn Crowley	Melbourne City Youth	7
2	(South Sudan) Abraham Majok	Western Sydney Wanderers Youth	6
3	(Australia) Angus Thurgate	Newcastle Jets Youth	5
