= 2018 National Premier Leagues Victoria =

7th season of the National Premier Leagues Victoria

National Premier Leagues Victoria
- Season: 2018
- Dates: 22 February – 23 September
- Matches played: 187
- Goals scored: 576 (3.08 per match)
- Top goalscorer: Brandon Barnes (22 goals)

The 2018 National Premier Leagues Victoria was the fifth season of the National Premier Leagues Victoria, the top league in Victorian football. Bentleigh Greens were the defending champions, having won their second championship title the previous season.

== Teams ==
Fourteen teams competed in the league – the top twelve teams from previous season and the two teams promoted from the NPL Victoria 2. The promoted teams were Dandenong Thunder from the Eastern conference and Northcote City from the Western conference. They replaced North Geelong Warriors and St Albans Saints.

=== Stadiums and locations ===
Note: Table lists in alphabetical order.

Team	Suburb	Stadium	Capacity
Avondale	Avondale Heights	City Vista Recreation Reserve	4,000
Bentleigh Greens	Cheltenham	Kingston Heath Soccer Complex	3,300
Dandenong City	Endeavour Hills	Frank Holohan Soccer Complex	4,000
Dandenong Thunder	Danedenong	George Andrews Reserve	5,000
Green Gully	St Albans	Green Gully Reserve	10,000
Heidelberg United	Heidelberg West	Olympic Village	12,000
Hume City	Broadmeadows	ABD Stadium	5,000
Kingston City	Clayton South	The Grange Reserve	1,000
Melbourne Knights	North Sunshine	Knights Stadium	1,000
Oakleigh Cannons	Oakleigh	Jack Edwards Reserve	5,000
Pascoe Vale	Coburg North	Hosken Reserve	1,325
Port Melbourne	Altona	SS Anderson Reserve	1,000
South Melbourne	Albert Park	Lakeside Stadium	15,000

== League table ==
Pos	Team	Pld	W	D	L	GF	GA	GD	Pts	Qualification or relegation
1	Heidelberg United (C)	26	19	2	5	60	29	+31	59	Qualification for the 2019 National Premier Leagues Finals series
2	Bentleigh Greens	26	18	4	4	53	28	+25	58	Qualification for the 2019 National Premier Leagues Victoria Finals series
3	Avondale	26	17	4	5	57	32	+25	55	Qualification for the 2019 National Premier Leagues Victoria Finals series
4	Pascoe Vale	26	13	6	7	42	31	+11	45	Qualification for the 2019 National Premier Leagues Victoria Finals series
5	Oakleigh Cannons	26	12	2	12	41	39	+2	38	Qualification for the 2019 National Premier Leagues Victoria Finals series
6	Port Melbourne	26	10	6	10	37	41	−4	36	Qualification for the 2019 National Premier Leagues Victoria Finals series
7	Kingston City	26	10	4	12	39	45	−6	34	
8	Dandenong Thunder	26	11	1	14	45	55	−10	34	
9	Melbourne Knights	26	9	5	12	45	53	−8	32	
10	South Melbourne	26	8	4	14	48	53	−5	28	
11	Hume City	26	7	7	12	29	43	−14	28	
12	Green Gully	26	7	5	14	41	49	−8	26	Qualification for the 2019 Relegation play-offs
13	Northcote City (R)	26	5	7	14	32	53	−21	22	Relegation to the National Premier Leagues Victoria 2
14	Bulleen Lions (R)	26	6	3	17	33	51	−18	21	Relegation to the National Premier Leagues Victoria 2

Source: SportsTG
Rules for classification: 1) Points; 2) Goal difference; 3) Goals scored
(C) Champions; (R) Relegated

== Results ==
Home \ Away	AVO	BEN	BUL	DTH	GRE	HEI	HUM	KIN	NOR	MBK	OAK	PAS	PMS	SOU
Avondale	—	1–2	2–0	1–0	3–0	1–1	3–0	3–0	1–0	4–3	2–0	1–1	0–1	6–2
Bentleigh Greens	1–0	—	6–2	3–1	2–0	1–0	1–0	2–0	3–1	2–1	3–0	2–0	3–4	0–1
Bulleen Lions	5–1	1–3	—	1–4	1–1	0–1	2–0	1–2	1–1	1–0	0–3	0–1	1–5	1–1
Dandenong Thunder	0–1	3–4	2–1	—	1–2	0–1	3–0	4–1	4–2	2–0	2–4	3–2	0–1	0–9
Green Gully	3–4	1–2	2–0	2–3	—	1–3	1–2	1–3	0–1	0–1	2–1	0–2	2–2	2–3
Heidelberg United	2–3	3–0	1–0	5–2	4–1	—	0–2	6–1	3–1	1–0	3–0	0–2	6–1	4–2
Hume City	2–5	0–3	2–0	1–1	2–2	1–2	—	1–1	1–0	3–3	0–2	2–1	1–0	0–1
Kingston City	2–0	4–4	0–4	0–1	1–1	4–1	4–2	—	2–0	1–0	1–2	0–1	0–1	0–2
Northcote City	1–3	0–0	2–4	3–2	2–4	0–1	1–1	3–1	—	1–1	2–1	0–1	1–1	3–2
Melbourne Knights	2–2	2–2	3–2	1–2	1–5	2–2	2–3	1–2	4–1	—	3–2	1–3	3–2	3–2
Oakleigh Cannons	2–2	0–1	2–1	2–1	0–1	1–3	1–0	2–0	5–2	3–4	—	2–1	1–1	4–1
Pascoe Vale	1–2	2–1	3–2	3–1	2–2	2–3	1–1	1–1	4–1	0–1	1–0	—	0–0	2–2
Port Melbourne	1–3	0–1	2–0	1–3	3–2	0–1	1–1	0–4	2–2	0–2	2–0	1–2	—	4–2
South Melbourne	0–3	1–1	1–2	4–0	0–3	1–3	2–1	1–4	1–1	5–1	0–1	2–3	0–1	—

Source: SportsTG
Legend: Blue = home team win; Yellow = draw; Red = away team win.

=== Finals series ===
==== Elimination-finals ====
7 September 2018	Pascoe Vale	1–2	Oakleigh Cannons	Fawkner
19:30	Lazarides 89'	Report	Dekker 42'; Brennan 50'	Stadium: CB Smith Reserve; Referee: Michael Mammis

8 September 2018	Avondale	3–1	Oakleigh Cannons	Parkville
15:00	Boland 33' (pen.); Katebian 75'; Germano 89'	Report	Stella 10'	Stadium: Avenger Park; Referee: Michael Mammis

==== Semi-finals ====
14 September 2018	Bentleigh Greens	3–4	Avondale	Cheltenham
19:30	Lucas 43', 105', 115'	Report	Kelly 119' (o.g.), 120+1' (o.g.); Germano 120+4'	Stadium: Kingston Heath Soccer Complex; Referee: Jack Morgan

14 September 2018	Heidelberg United	1–1 (5–4 p)	Oakleigh Cannons	Heidelberg West
19:30	Petrie 61'	Report	Bosnjak 39' (pen.)	Stadium: Olympic Village; Referee: Jonathan Barreiro

==== Grand Final ====
23 September 2018
18:30

Heidelberg United	2–1	Avondale
Zahra 5'; Cartanos 41'	Report	Germano 78'

AAMI Park, Richmond
Referee: Adam Bavcar

== Season statistics ==
=== Scoring ===
==== Top scorers ====
Rank	Player	Club	Goals
1	(Australia) Brandon Barnes	Dandenong Thunder	22
2	(England) Liam Boland	Avondale	16
3	(Australia) Davey van 't Schip	Pascoe Vale	15
4	(Australia) Thomas Cahill	Bentleigh Greens	14
4	(England) Kaine Sheppard	Avondale	14
6	(Australia) Joey Katebian	Avondale	11

=== Discipline ===
==== Player ====
- Most yellow cards: 8
  - (Australia) Blair Govan (Hume City)
  - (Australia) Joey Katebian (Avondale)
  - (Australia) Tomislav Uskok (Melbourne Knights)
  - (Australia) Reuben Way (Heidelberg United)
- Most red cards: 2
  - (Australia) Darby Dexter (Hume City)
  - (Australia) Lewis Hall (Heidelberg United)
  - (Australia) Shaun Timmins (Melbourne Knights)
