= Ryan Peterson =

Ryan Peterson may refer to:

- Ryan Peterson (politician), Canadian politician
- Ryan Peterson (soccer, born 1996), Australian soccer player
- Ryan Peterson (soccer, born 1995), American soccer player

== See also ==
- Ryan Petersen, producer and songwriter
