= Australia–South Sudan relations =

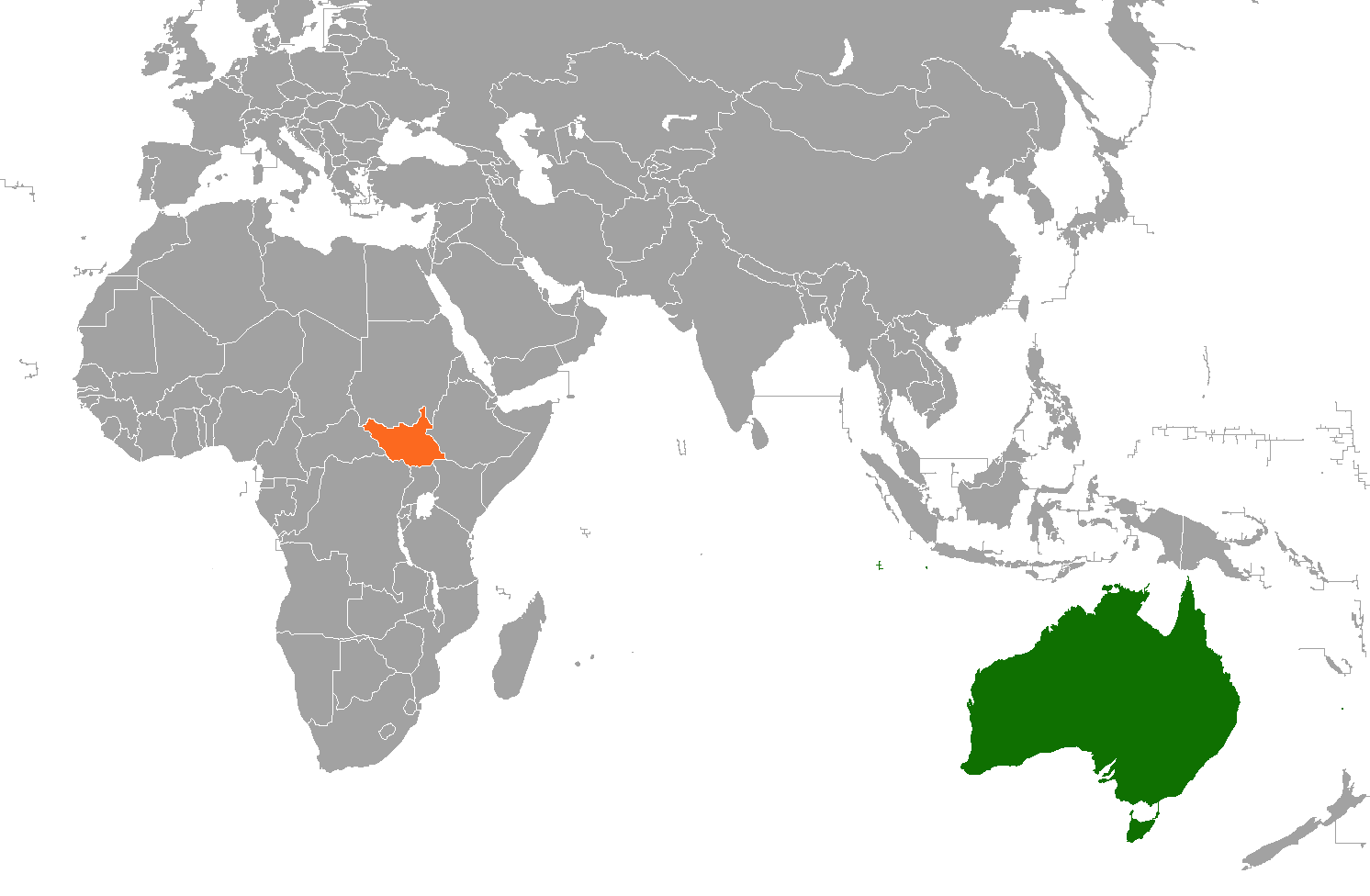

- Australia: South Sudan

Official relations exist between Australia and South Sudan. While the two countries do not have official embassies in each other's nation, they share a strong and common tie.

== Historical and current tie ==
Both were formerly parts of the British Empire, and the English is the main language in both nations.

Throughout the Sudanese Civil Wars (1955–1972 and 1983–2005), many South Sudanese refugees had sought refuge in Kenya. Australia was one of the first countries to announce its support in resettling South Sudanese refugees. Thus, the South Sudanese community was the first-ever organized African community in Australia, and also the largest African diaspora in that country.

When South Sudan gained independence in 2011, Australia was one of the first countries to recognize it. However, due to the ongoing South Sudanese Civil War, Australia was forced to play a peacekeeping role in the new nation. And because of the large South Sudanese diaspora in the country, Australia was subsequently asked to play a larger role.

== South Sudanese in Australia ==
South Sudanese refugees first arrived in Australia during the 1990s.

While the South Sudanese community in Australia tends to be well-integrated, racism remains an issue in the country. Criminal activity by South Sudanese gangs prompted hostility and xenophobia against South Sudanese by Australians, creating fear for South Sudanese people in the country. Racial issues also played a role in the cancellation of the South Sudanese Australian Basketball Association Summer Slam in 2018.

Nonetheless, a number of famous South Sudanese Australians had taken steps to slow anti-South Sudanese sentiment in Australia. Notable figures include Awer Mabil, who won a FIFA global award for his charity work with South Sudanese refugees in Kenya, Thomas Deng, Abraham Majok and Bruce Kamau.

== See also ==
- South Sudanese Australians
