= Sydney FC Centre of Excellence =

Australian soccer ground in Gosford, NSW

Sydney FC Centre Of Excellence
- Sky Park
- Interactive map of Sydney FC Centre Of Excellence
- Location: North Ryde, New South Wales, Australia
- Owner: Macquarie University
- Operator: Sydney FC
- Capacity: 1,000
- Surface: Grass

Construction
- Groundbreaking: July 2021
- Opened: May 2023
- Cost: $20 million

Tenants
- Sydney FC (men) (Training and administration); Sydney FC (women) (Training and administration); Sydney FC (NPL/Academy) (Training, administration, NPL)

Website
- sydneyfc.com/sky-park

The Sydney FC Centre Of Excellence colloquially known as Sky Park is the training and administrative headquarters of professional Australian soccer club Sydney FC, located in the sporting precinct of Macquarie University in North Ryde, New South Wales. The club has based its training and academy facilities at Macquarie University since 2007.

== History ==
Sydney FC has been a long-term tenant of the university, having based its training facilities out of the University's sporting fields since 2007. In 2019 former CEO Danny Townsend announced that the club would be transitioning into new facilities, either at the university or in the sporting precinct of Moore Park, adjacent to the Sydney Football Stadium

In May 2021 it was announced that the club would be extending its partnership with Macquarie University on a 25-year lease, with the construction of the centre of excellence to begin shortly thereafter, with the club choosing to stay at the university over other sites in Moore Park, Tempe, St George and Leichhardt. The construction of the centre of excellence was partially funded by the NSW Government under its Centre of Excellence Grant scheme with the club receiving $5 million towards the program.

== Facilities ==
The facility is used by the Sydney FC men's, women's, and National Premier League teams, in addition to both the men's and women's Academy. The elite facility includes 3 full sized training fields, including a marquee pitch with grandstand facilities, high tech training and medical facilities, gender inclusive change rooms, hot and cold recovery aquatic pools, and a multi-purpose lecture theatre. In addition, within the administrative section of the main building there is a museum hosting the club history and trophy displays.

== See also ==
- Adelaide United Training Centre
- City Football Academy (Melbourne, 2022)
- Central Coast Mariners Centre of Excellence
