= Heidelberg United FC =

Heidelberg United
- Full name: Heidelberg United Alexander Football Club
- Nicknames: Αλέξανδρος (Aléxandros; Alexander); Μέγας (Mégas; Great); Bergers; Warriors; The People's Club
- Founded: 1958; 68 years ago (as Alexander The Great-Melbourne Soccer Club)
- Ground: Olympic Park, Heidelberg West, Victoria
- Capacity: 12,000
- Manager: John Anastasiadis
- League: NPL Victoria
- 2026: 5th of 14
- Website: hufc.com.au
Home colours	Away colours

Heidelberg United Alexander Football Club, commonly known as Heidelberg United, ‘’’ Heidelberg Florina’’’, Alexander the Great (Greek: Μέγας Αλέξανδρος), or simply Alexander (Greek: Αλέξανδρος), is an Australian professional soccer club based in Heidelberg West, a suburb of Melbourne, Victoria. Founded in 1958 by Greek Macedonian immigrants, the club currently competes in the National Premier Leagues Victoria. Heidelberg United plays its home matches at Olympic Park.

== History ==
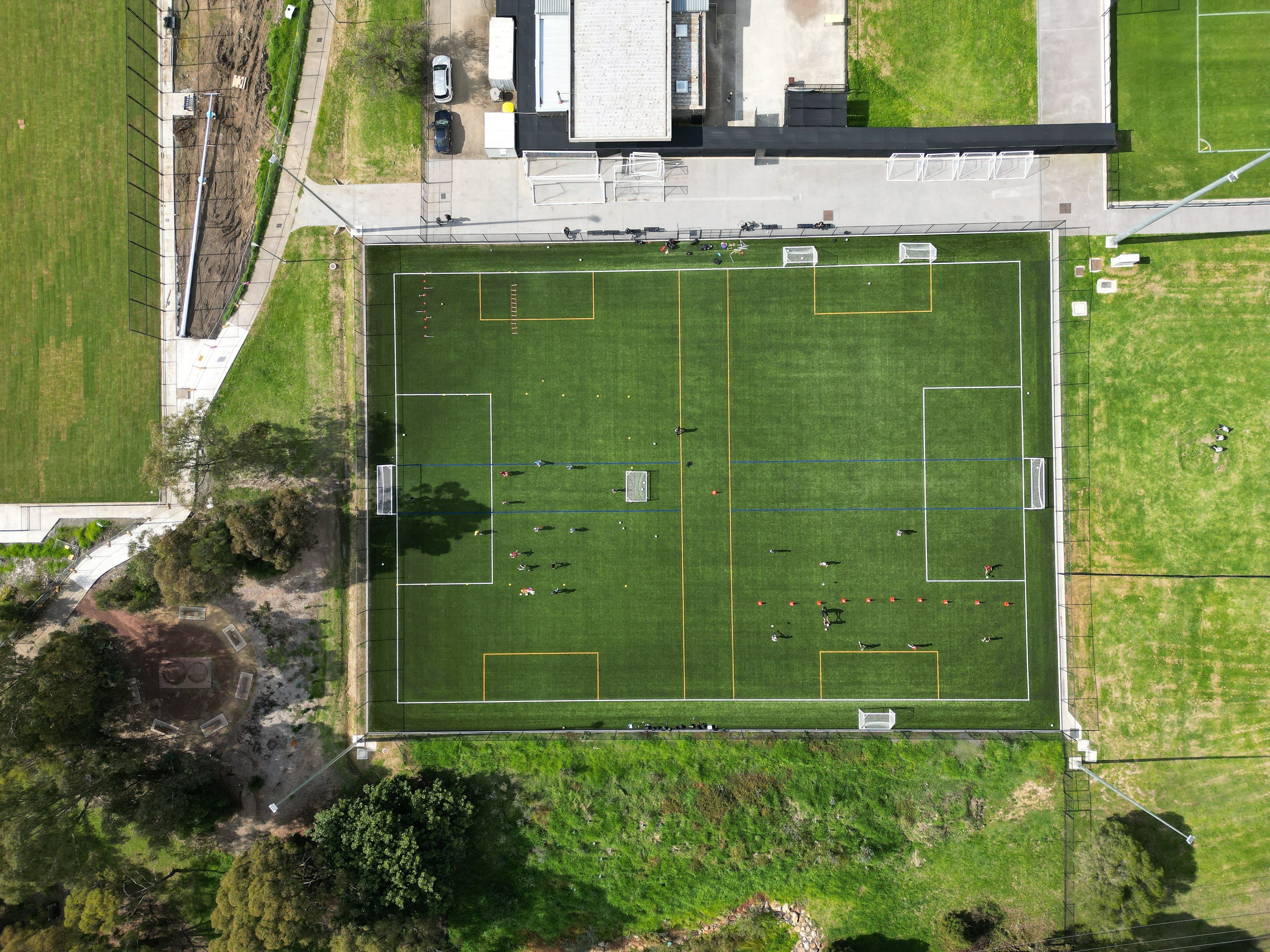
Aerial perspective of Heidelberg United Football Club. April 2023.

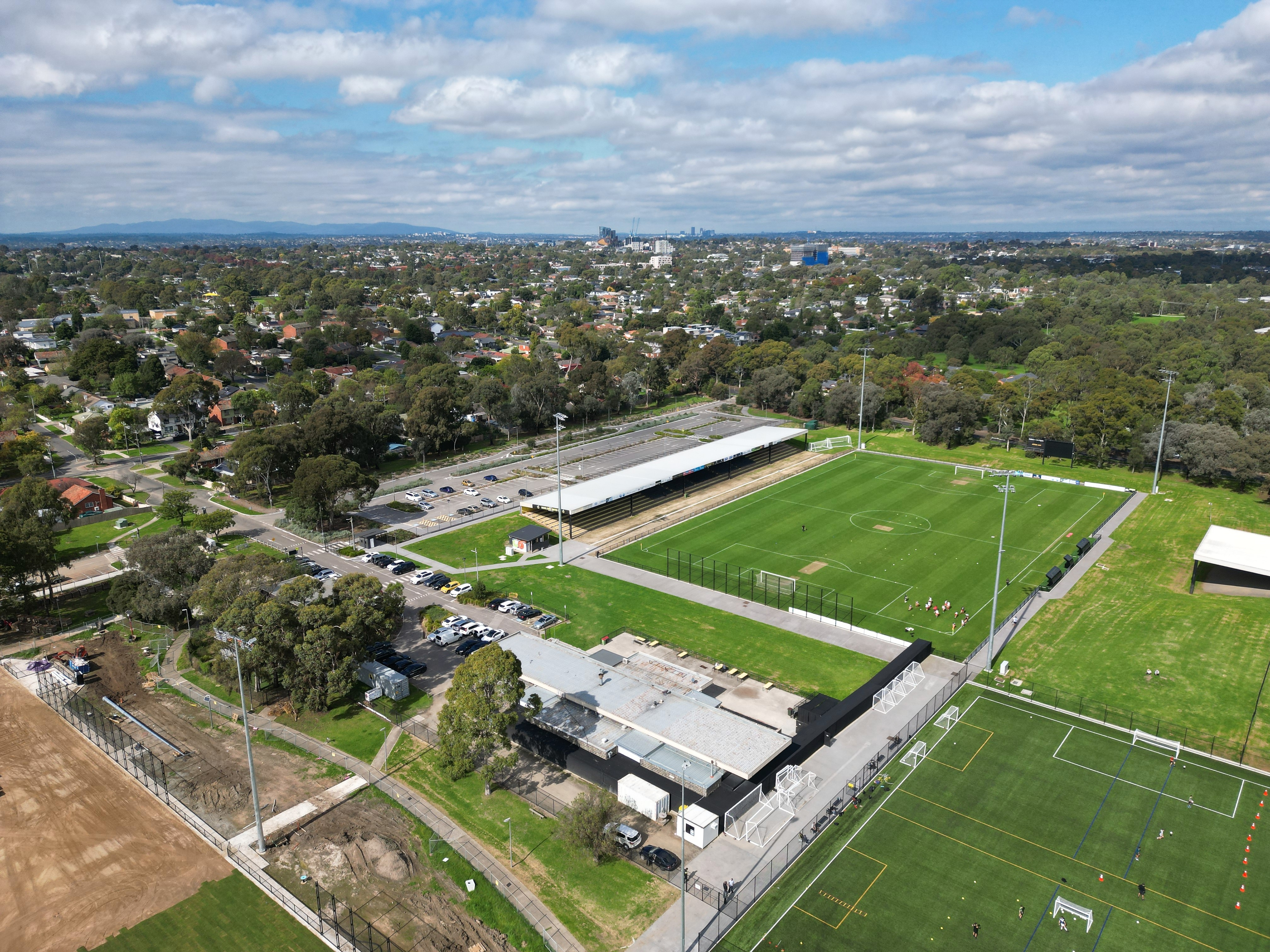
Aerial perspective of Heidelberg United Football Club amidst the Olympic Park Village. April 2023.

=== Foundation and beginnings (1958–1979) ===
The Heidelberg United Alexander Soccer Club was founded in 1958 by Greek immigrants from Florina, Greece. They decided to form their own social club, the Clifton Hill Social Club. It was at that time when families, mainly immigrants wives and their unmarried children, began to arrive in Australia in great numbers.

In May 1955 the founding members, George Evgeniadis”Mouchos", George Baniscas, Nicholas Themelkos, Nick Romanidis, Tryphon Rakovalis, Tryphon Avramopoulos, Chris Samartzis and Peter Economidis commenced their meetings at the residence of Tryphon Rakovalis in Fairfield. Their successful gathering attracted mostly Florinians, as well as from other regions. In 1957 discussions to establish "Alexander The Great" began.

Markos Economidis managed to convince the committee of Clifton Hill Social Club to contribute the funds required to purchase the necessary gear for the team. On 12 May 1958, the Clifton Hill members organised their first appeal. A total of 125 pounds was collected. Wishing to broaden support for the soccer team and in an effort to avoid any political affiliation and, thus, conflict, the leaders of "Alexander The Great" launched a campaign to run a completely independent sporting club. Their move gained momentum immediately.

The first committee consisting of George Baniscas (president), Markos Economidis (secretary), Nicholas Themelkos (vice-president), Tryphon Rakovalis (treasurer), A. Doukas, E. Mangopoulos, G. Milopoulos, V. Iliopoulos and T. Iliopoulos and members. They declared Megas Alexandros its administrative independence from Clifton Hill Social Club.

During the first two years (1958–1959) "Alexander the Great" received the financial support of the Clifton Hill Social Club, as well as of their own membership, the spectators and supporters, even the players. The records of the club indicate, for example, that on 1 February 1960 the players donated the amount of £5/3/- (5 pounds, 3 shillings). The inaugural game was played on 13 September 1958 attracting 400 spectators and £2/2/10 (2 pounds, 2 shillings, 10 pence) was collected, an amount which was increased to £5/8/3 (5 pounds, 8 shillings, 3 pence) within three months following the successful and popular start up of the club. The committee members walked around the fences to collect the entrance 'tickets' in a hat. Their wives were responsible for washing the playing gear and for having the first-aid box ready. The main expenditure areas included the hiring of the soccer grounds, administrative expenses, players' clothing, fees for the referee, usually £1/10/0- (1 pound, 10 shillings) and drinks for the players.

In 1959 the first elections took place which returned the old committee with the addition of A. Nicolaides, L. Pavlides, E. Kreskas, P Boubis, S. Sakellarides, and S. Theos. The new committee increased the numbers of social activities in an effort to attract more family members to stabilise the affairs of the club and create a stronger team. The weekly social dances of the club were held at the Masonic Hall, Queens Parade, Clifton Hill. The members paid two shillings and sixpence as an entrance fee, which cleared an average of 40 pounds per week.

Following the successful first two years, Alexander the Great applied unsuccessfully for a place in the Victorian Amateur Soccer Football Association (VASFA). The club's secretary, Markos Economides, in his letters dated 9 February and 17 March 1959 to the President of the VASF H.J. Dockerty, requested Alexander the Great's admission to the Victoria Provisional League. The club received a negative reply in a letter signed by VASFA's Secretary-Manager, S. Beaton, claiming that the club had not played a sufficient number of games to prove its strength, durability and financial stability. In September 1959, the committee, amidst renewed recruitment of players and membership, reapplied. This time Alexander the Great was admitted to the Provisional League, together with four other teams. By this time, the club had managed to build a strong and skilful squad of twenty-one players, almost unbeatable in their category in Victoria. The 1958 and 1959 team included the players A. Balis, A. Boutlis, J. Dafinis, Th. Doukas, D. Filippou, V. Hatzigeorgiou, V. lordanis, K. Korfiatis, A. Politis, N. Romanides, C. Rakovalis, S. Savvides, A. Soumelides, P Themelkos, C. Zouros and C. Zygomanis. In 1960 Megas Alexandros was enriched and further strengthened with Th. Boutlis, L. Foutoulis, the brothers Evan and George Morihovitis, Th. Tangas, E. Taskas, K. Xanthopoulos and C. Zouros.

During its inaugural appearance in the provisional league competition, Alexander the Great was declared the undisputed champions of the league, easily winning 34 points and scoring 113 goals. The official magazine of the VASFA, Soccer News, in its 24 September 1960 edition under the title 'Alexander are Real Champions' paid tribute to the club implicitly signalling, perhaps, remorse for the delayed admission: "of the entrants, Alexander proved themselves champions when they easily won the League Championship with a total of 34 points. Their attack was the best of any team competing in Victorian soccer this season, with 113 goals scored."

With its successful appearance in competitive soccer, the club received an additional boost in the following years (1961–1963), winning all league competitions and climbing to the State League in 1964. In 1965 Alexander's activities declined due to internal administrative problems and the team was relegated. Next year (1966) the club again won the first division premiership and was promoted to State League only to drop back in 1969. In 1970 it survived the transition and became a leading force when it won the 1975 Victorian State League (today's Victorian Premier League) Championship under its then name of Fitzroy United Alexander Soccer Club under coach Manolis Poulakakis.

=== National Soccer League (1977–1996) ===
Chart of yearly table positions for Heidelberg United in NSL

Fitzroy United Alexander was a founding member of the National Soccer League and proved to be a model team for consistency, since it managed to score, throughout the years, the second best performance rate of all Australian teams competing in the highest league. At one stage (1982–1985) seven of the 16 national Socceroo players were players from the club.

Following the formation of the National Soccer League in 1977, the club commenced negotiations with the Heidelberg City Council to move its grounds from Fitzroy to Heidelberg. The local council decided to lease the historic Olympic Village (the training venue for the Melbourne 1956 Olympics) to Alexander. The terms and conditions of the lease were advantageous to the Club which was obtaining access to a prestigious soccer field, with a pavilion and track and field facilities. The committee, led by a solicitor and ex-player of the team, James Mangopoulos, began in November 1977 negotiating the possibility of leasing the grounds surrounding the pitch at the Olympic Village.

In 1978 the Mangopoulos Committee announced its plan to move to Heidelberg and advertised the erection of a covered grandstand seating 1,500 spectators, turnstiles and public facilities for 3,000 people, incurring a cost of $400,000 out of a total cost of the overall scheme of about $950,000. The contracts, however, were not finalised until 1982. The City of Heidelberg agreed to lease the land for thirty years, charging the club a nominal amount. The club in the meantime obtained an official legal status by its registration with the Corporate Affairs Commission of Victoria in 1977.

The late 1970s and early 1980s the Club went through what many regard as its "Golden Era". In 1980, the Club won the "Top 4" play-off series beating Sydney City by 4 goals to nil in Canberra. Towards the end of the 1980s, the Club encountered difficulties both on and off the park. It was twice relegated (1987 and 1989) but managed to be promoted the next year back into the NSL. During this period for Heidelberg players such Juan Toro, Derek Lea and Charlie Yankos participated in this golden era.

In the 1990s it continued to play a prominent role in Australian soccer, operating with a yearly budget of more than $500,000. However, in 1995 the Club suffered a major setback when it was excluded from the National Soccer League along with Melbourne Zebras and the Parramatta Eagles. Soccer Australia, led by David Hill began the "cleansing process" of the league trying to remove all remnants of ethnicity by forcing Clubs to change their names. Alexander The Great made an attempt to rejoin the National League in a joint partnership arrangement with the Collingwood Football Club and whilst things looked promising at the start, pressure from the AFL saw the venture collapse by the end of its inaugural season. The team did however manage to win the National League Cup in 1996 emulating the feats of Heidelberg United who won the cup for the first time three years earlier in 1993.

=== Victorian Premier League (1996–2013) ===
On their return to the Victorian league in 1996, Heidelberg had a reasonably successful season, eventually losing in the Grand Final against Altona Magic in penalties after scores were locked at 3–3 after extra time. In 1998 they found themselves relegated, but won promotion back at their first attempt, rejoining the VPL in 2000, and winning the title in 2001. Their rollercoaster recent history however saw them relegated the next season, until they found themselves back in the VPL once more in 2005, and finishing runners up to Green Gully. A solid season in 2006 saw them reach the Preliminary Final, where they were knocked out by Altona Magic in extra time. An inconsistent season in 2007 saw the Bergers finish 8th and miss out on finals.

Celebrating the 50-year anniversary of the club, 2008 transpired to be a successful season which included United winning the Hellenic Cup for the first time in its history. The season continued its positive direction seeing Heidelberg finish 4th in the Victorian Premier League after the Home and Away matches, and finishing the season in 3rd place following the finals series where they lost to the Melbourne Knights in the Preliminary final. 2010 was another strong season for the Warriors, finishing fourth in the league. They won their elimination final against Northcote City 3–1 but lost the minor semi final to Hume City 2–0.

In 2012, the club was relegated after a bottom place finish, but quickly returned to the top flight after taking out the State League 1 Championship in 2013.

=== National Premier Leagues Victoria (2014–current) ===
The club's first season in the newly established National Premier Leagues Victoria, what was formerly the Victorian Premier League, saw them finish in 3rd place.

In the 2015 season, the Club qualified for the 2015 FFA Cup, through the Dockerty Cup. The Club progressed from the Round of 32 by beating Broadmeadow Magic FC 3–1 in Newcastle, then becoming one of the five Victorian clubs to progress through to the last eight, after defeating former NSL giants Sydney United 58 FC. Daniel Heffernan's goal after 26 seconds was the fastest ever goal scored in the FFA Cup. The club signed 116-time capped Greek international Kostas Katsouranis for their FFA Cup clash with Melbourne City FC. The Bergers went down 5–0 to their A-League opponents in the quarter final, but managed to draw a crowd of 11,372 at their home ground Olympic Village. The crowd was the second biggest crowd in FFA Cup history. The Warriors also made the reintroduced finals series of the 2015 National Premier Leagues Victoria season, after a third placed league finish, but lost to Pascoe Vale SC at the first hurdle.

In September 2015, the Bergers' star strikers Daniel Heffernan was signed by A-League club Central Coast Mariners. Heidelberg made a strange start to their 2016 campaign, opening the season with a record 6–0 defeat to South Melbourne FC at Lakeside Stadium, before bouncing back to defeat Melbourne Knights FC with an incredible scoreline of 6–1, scoring 4 goals in the opening 15 minutes. On 5 August 2016, Heidelberg confirmed the signing of Melbourne Victory icon Archie Thompson. Heidelberg finished the season in 2nd place, losing 2–1 to South Melbourne in the finals series semi-final.

On 1 August 2017, Heidelberg United defeated A-League side Perth Glory FC 1–0 at Olympic Village in the Round of 32 at the 2017 FFA Cup. Heidelberg took out the 2017 NPL Victoria premiership, but lost out to Bentleigh Greens in the Grand Final. Heidelberg became national champions of the NPL for the first time after defeating Bayswater City SC, APIA Leichhardt Tigers FC and Brisbane Strikers FC.

On 19 August 2018, Heidelberg secured back-to-back NPL Victoria Premierships with two rounds remaining after defeating South Melbourne at Olympic Village 4–2. The premiership was secured in the Bergers' 60th year of existence. Heidelberg went on to claim the championship, defeating Avondale FC 2–1 at AAMI Park. It was Heidelberg's first Premier League title since 2001.

In June 2019, Heidelberg began demolition of their home ground Olympic Village in preparation of a staged refurbishment of the precinct. The total cost of the project is $11m. To date, the club has secured $2m in state government funding, $3.1m from the City of Banyule and $0.5m from Soltilo Soccer School. On the last round of the 2019 NPL Victoria season, the Bergers secured a third consecutive Premiers Plate with a 3–0 victory over South Melbourne.

=== 2025 ===
After finishing 2nd for the NPLM 2025 season, Heidelberg United were crowned National Premier League Victoria champions as they defeated Dandenong City 2–1 in the final, which was played at Lakeside Stadium in front of a crowd of over 9,000.

They will also compete in the inaugural 2025 Australian Championship after finishing runners-up in the regular season of NPL Victoria in the 2025 season.

During the 2025 Australia Cup, Heidelberg defeated three A-League teams in a row (Western Sydney Wanderers 3–0, Wellington Phoenix 4–0, Aukland FC 2–0) and reached the final on 4 October, where they faced A-League team Newcastle Jets. Newcastle defeated Heidelberg 3–1 in extra time in front of a 10,000 strong crowd at Lakeside Stadium.

=== 2026 ===
Since 2025 Australia Cup winners Newcastle Jets qualified for the Champions League Elite via their league position, the spot in the 2026–27 AFC Champions League Two reserved for the Australia Cup winners was transferred to Heidelberg United as the runners-up. On 19 May 2026, the AFC has advised Football Australia that Heidelberg United FC is ineligible for the ACL Two slot under its regulations.

== Stadium ==
Heidelberg's home ground is Olympic Village in Heidelberg West.

Olympic Park (Village) was built for the 1956 Olympic Games in Melbourne, Australia. The venue was used as the official warm-up venue for the Olympics.

The ground has a main grandstand with seating for 1,000 as well as undercover standing room. Opposite the main stadium is smaller grandstand with more undercover standing room. Both stands have grass hills on either side but there is no spectator room behind each of the goals. One end contains player facilities while the other has a fence with advertising and the scoreboard. The original athletics track was removed in late 2019. The total capacity of the ground is 12,000.

The stadium has been Heidelberg's home for most of their history and has seen many large crowds against rivals such as South Melbourne FC and Melbourne Knights FC.

A crowd of 11,372 people turned up to watch the 2015 FFA Cup quarter final match between Heidelberg United and Melbourne City. This was the second highest crowd in FFA Cup history.

== Crest and colours ==
Heidelberg's crest features Greek icon Alexander the Great holding a shield, who was born in the city in which the founders of the club originated from.

The club colours are primarily yellow and black.

== Players ==
As of 1 August 2026

Note: Flags indicate national team as defined under FIFA eligibility rules; some limited exceptions apply. Players may hold more than one non-FIFA nationality.

No.	Pos.	Nation	Player
1	GK	AUS	Yaren Sözer
2	DF	IRL	Karl O'Sullivan
3	DF	AUS	Ben Collins
4	DF	AUS	Ryan Lethlean
5	DF	AUS	Tass Mourdoukoutas
6	MF	AUS	Anthony Lesiotis
7	MF	AUS	Fletcher Fulton
8	MF	AUS	Marcus Humbert
9	FW	AUS	Ciaran Bramwell
10	MF	JPN	Asahi Yokokawa
11	MF	AUS	Angus Taylor
14	DF	AUS	Kayne Razmovski

No.	Pos.	Nation	Player
15	FW	SSD	Chok Dau
17	MF	AUS	Jay McGowan
18	DF	AUS	Anthony Theodoropoulos
19	MF	NZL	Joseph Lee
20	FW	AUS	Max Bisetto
21	DF	AUS	Ethan Sardellis
22	GK	AUS	Ashton Bonsall
25	MF	AUS	Yani Nassis
27	MF	AUS	Nick Tsimos
—	MF	SSD	Gideon Arok
—	MF	AUS	Christian Theoharous

== Notable players ==
- (Greece) Michalis Simigdalas
- (Greece) Kostas Nikolaidis
- (Greece) Spyros Pomonis
- (Greece) Kostas Papageorgiou
- (Australia) Andreas Govas
- (Argentina) Adrian Caceres
- (Greece) Kostas Katsouranis

== Honours ==
- National Soccer League
  - Winners: (Note: The NSL finals series was not considered the championship for the 1980 National Soccer League.) 1980
  - Runners-up: 1979
- NSL Cup
  - Winners: 1992–93, 1996–97
  - Runners-up: 1980, 1982, 1983, 1994–95
- Australia Cup
  - Runners-up: 2025
- National Premier Leagues
  - Champions: 2017
- National Premier Leagues Victoria
  - Champions: 1975, 1988, 1990, 2001, 2018, 2025
  - Minor premiers: 2017, 2018, 2019
- Victorian Metropolitan League 1
  - Champions: 1965, 1969
- Victorian State League 1
  - Champions: 2004, 2013
- Victorian Division 1 North
  - Champions: 1963
- Victorian Division 2 North
  - Champions: 1961
- Victorian Provisional League
  - Champions: 1960
- Buffalo Gold Cup
  - Winners: 1985
- Hellenic Cup
  - Winners: 2008
- Dockerty Cup
  - Winners: 2017

== Individual honours ==
- Victorian Premier League Player of the Year Award
- 1973 – Vince Bannon
- 1974 – Pat Bannon
- 2008 – Graham Hockless
- Bill Fleming Medal
- 2001 – Jim Kourtis
- 2009 – Osagie Ederaro
- Victorian Premier League Coach of the Year Award
- 2005 – Phil Stubbins
- Victorian Premier League Top Goalscorer Award
- 1975 – Frank Donachie
- 1990 – Paul Lewis
- 1996 – Bobby Despotovski
- Victorian Premier League Goalkeeper of the Year Award
- 2001 – Jim Kourtis
- National Soccer League Top Goalscorer Award
- 1980 – Gary Cole 21
- 1981 – Gary Cole 16
- National Soccer League Under 21 Player of the Year
- 1985 George Katsakis
- 1986 Nick Ousalkas
- 1992 Kevin Muscat

== See also ==
- Collingwood Warriors
