= Adelaide United Training Centre =

Training ground of Adelaide United Football Club

- Interactive map of Adelaide United Training Centre
- Location: Ridley Reserve, Elizabeth
- Coordinates: 34°43′46.1″S 138°40′21.9″E
- Owner: Adelaide United FC
- Type: Football training ground

Construction
- Built: 16 September 2015
- Opened: 17 September 2015
- Construction cost: $700,000

The Adelaide United Training Centre, often referred to as its geographical location in Ridley Reserve, is the training ground of Adelaide United Football Club.

== History and development ==
At the commencement of construction Glenn Docherty (the Mayor of the City of Playford) remarked that having Adelaide United at the new facilities within Elizabeth would be fantastic. The Training Centre was officially opened by Adelaide United Chief Executive Michael Petrillo on 17 September 2015.

== See also ==
- City Football Academy (Melbourne, 2022)
- Central Coast Mariners Centre of Excellence
- Sydney FC Centre of Excellence
