= Abraham Majok =

South Sudanese footballer (born 1998)

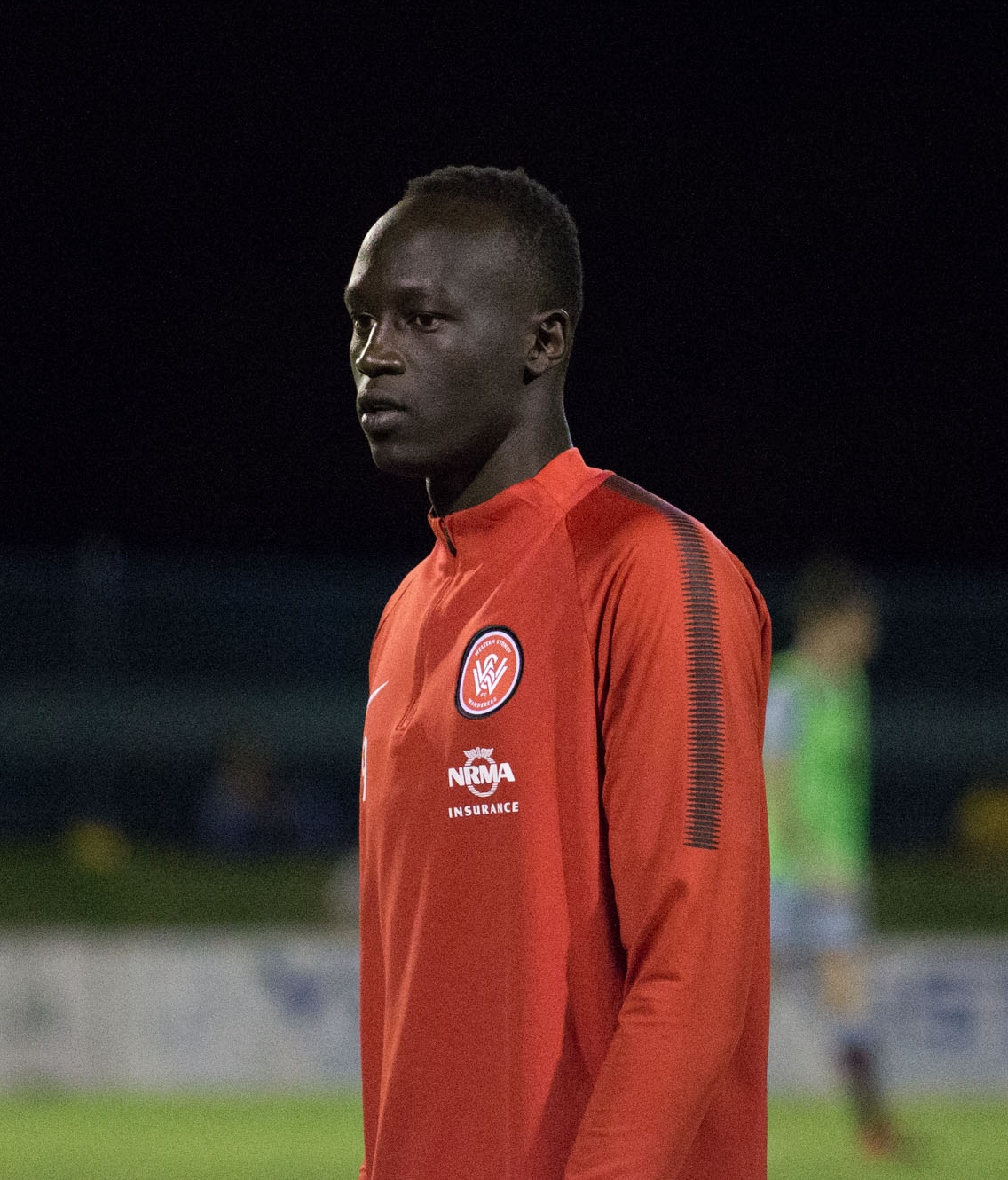
- Majok warming up for Western Sydney Wanderers

Personal information
- Full name: Manyiel Riel Majok
- Date of birth: 13 October 1998 (age 28)
- Place of birth: Kakuma, Kenya
- Height: 1.85 m (6 ft 1 in)
- Positions: Winger; forward

Team information
- Current team: Mounties Wanderers
- Number: 45

Youth career
- GHFA Spirit

Senior career*
| Years | Team | Apps | (Gls) |
| 2014–2015 | GHFA Spirit | 27 | (13) |
| 2016 | Mt Druitt Town Rangers | 28 | (8) |
| 2016–2019 | Western Sydney Wanderers | 19 | (2) |
| 2017–2019 | Western Sydney Wanderers NPL | 20 | (11) |
| 2019–2020 | Central Coast Mariners | 2 | (0) |
| 2020–2021 | PAEEK | 10 | (2) |
| 2022 | AmaZulu | 4 | (0) |
| 2022–2023 | Anagennisi Deryneia | 24 | (2) |
| 2024–2025 | Sydney Olympic | 22 | (4) |
| 2025 | Mt Druitt Town Rangers | 10 | (1) |
| 2026– | Mounties Wanderers | 16 | (5) |

International career^{‡}
| 2019 | Australia U23 | 2 | (2) |
| 2022– | South Sudan | 1 | (0) |
- * Club domestic league appearances and goals as of 31 August 2026 ‡ National team caps and goals as of 28 March 2022

Manyiel Riel "Abraham" Majok (born 13 October 1998) is a South Sudanese professional footballer who plays for Football NSW League Two side Mounties Wanderers.

== Club career ==
He began his career with Spirit FC before joining Mt Druitt Town Rangers. After impressing the coaching staff at the Western Sydney Wanderers during a match against the club, Majok was invited to train with the A-League side before being offered a place with their youth team.

=== Western Sydney Wanderers ===
On 21 February 2017, after playing for the club's youth team, Majok made his professional debut for the Western Sydney Wanderers in their AFC Champions League clash against the Urawa Red Diamonds, playing 66 minutes before being replaced by Ryan Griffiths. He followed this up a week later by playing in the Wanderers' clash with Shanghai SIPG, seeing out the final 5 minutes as they were defeated 5–1. He made his first league appearance in a Round 27 clash with Adelaide United at Coopers Stadium, replacing Nicolás Martínez in the 64th minute, the match going on to finish 2–2.

On 19 May 2017, he signed a two-year professional contract with the Wanderers, having previously been on a youth contract. Majok was part of the 2017-18 Y-League championship winning Western Sydney Wanderers Youth team. He played the full 90 minutes as they beat Melbourne City Youth 3–1 in the 2018 Y-League Grand Final on 3 February 2018. He finished the season as top-scorer with nine goals in seven games, collecting the Y-League Golden Boot for his efforts.

Majok made his first appearance of the 2018–19 season as a second-half substitute in a Round 1 clash against Sydney FC in the Sydney Derby, the Wanderers' losing the match 2–0. He scored his first professional goal on 13 January 2019, scoring Western Sydney's 3rd as they were beaten 4–3 by Perth Glory.

=== Central Coast Mariners ===
On 21 June 2019, Majok signed a one-year contract with the Central Coast Mariners. He scored his first goal for the club in a late win over Hume in the FFA Cup in September 2019.

He was released by the Mariners in March 2020, and made a total of two A-League appearances for the team.

=== PAEEK ===
In July 2020, Majok signed with Cypriot club PAEEK.

== International career ==
After representing Australia at under-23 level, he was selected for the South Sudan national team in September 2019 but declined the call up. He accepted a call up from South Sudan in June 2021, however he didn't take part in the game against Jordan due to COVID-19 pandemic. He debuted with South Sudan in 1–0 2023 Africa Cup of Nations qualification win over Djibouti on 27 March 2022.

== Honours ==
Mounties Wanderers

- Football NSW League Two Premiership: 2026

Western Sydney Wanderers

- Y-League: 2017–18

PAEEK

- Cypriot Second Division: 2020–21

Individual

- Y-League Golden Boot: 2017–18
