= Jeremy Cox =

American football player (born 1996)

No. 35
- Position: Running back

Personal information
- Born: August 16, 1996 (age 30); Hope Mills, North Carolina, U.S.
- Listed height: 6 ft 0 in (1.83 m)
- Listed weight: 226 lb (103 kg)

Career information
- High school: South View (Hope Mills, North Carolina)
- College: Old Dominion
- NFL draft: 2019: undrafted

Career history
- Los Angeles Chargers (2019)*; Denver Broncos (2020); Arlington Renegades (2023)*; Houston Roughnecks (2023); Southwest Kansas Storm (2024); Arlington Renegades (2024)
- * Offseason or practice squad member only
- Stats at Pro Football Reference

Jeremy Cox (born August 16, 1996) is an American former football running back. He played college football at Old Dominion.

== College career ==
Cox was a member of the Old Dominion Monarchs for four seasons. He finished his collegiate career second in school history with 2,175 rushing yards and fourth with 23 rushing touchdowns on 451 carries and also caught 75 passes for 532 yards and one touchdown.

== Professional career ==
Pre-draft measurables
Height	Weight	Arm length	Hand span	40-yard dash	10-yard split	20-yard split	20-yard shuttle	Three-cone drill	Vertical jump	Broad jump	Bench press
5 ft 11 5/8 in (1.82 m)	223 lb (101 kg)	31 in (0.79 m)	9 1/2 in (0.24 m)	4.42 s	1.62 s	2.59 s	4.19 s	6.90 s	39.0 in (0.99 m)	10 ft 7 in (3.23 m)	25 reps
All values from Pro Day

=== Los Angeles Chargers ===
Cox was signed by the Los Angeles Chargers as an undrafted free agent on April 28, 2019. He was waived on August 31, 2019, during final roster cuts.

=== Denver Broncos ===
Cox was signed to a reserve/futures contract by the Denver Broncos on February 17, 2020. He was waived on September 5, 2020, during final roster cuts and was re-signed to the team's practice squad the following day. Cox was elevated to the active roster and made his NFL debut on October 18, 2020, in an 18–12 win over the New England Patriots before being reverted to the practice squad the following day. He was elevated to the active roster for the team's week 7 game against the Kansas City Chiefs, and reverted to the practice squad again after the game. He was promoted to the active roster on October 31, 2020. Cox was waived on December 11, 2020, and re-signed to the practice squad four days later. On January 4, 2021, Cox signed a reserve/futures contract with the Broncos. He was waived on May 4, 2021.

=== Arlington Renegades ===
Cox was assigned to the Arlington Renegades of the XFL on January 6, 2023. He was released during final roster cuts.

=== Houston Roughnecks ===
On April 12, 2023, Cox was signed by the Houston Roughnecks of the XFL. The Roughnecks brand was transferred to the Houston Gamblers when the XFL and USFL merged to create the United Football League (UFL).

=== Arlington Renegades (second stint) ===
On May 22, 2024, Cox signed with the Renegades.
