= Michael Trajkovski =

Australian soccer player

Personal information
- Full name: Michael Trajkovski
- Date of birth: 19 May 1997 (age 29)
- Place of birth: Sydney, Australia
- Positions: Striker; attacking midfielder

Team information
- Current team: South Coast Flame

Youth career
- Sydney Olympic
- 2015–2016: Western Sydney Wanderers

Senior career*
| Years | Team | Apps | (Gls) |
| 2015 | Western Sydney Wanderers | 1 | (0) |
| 2016 | Western Sydney Wanderers NPL | 4 | (0) |
| 2018 | St George FA | 9 | (1) |
| 2019 | APIA Leichhardt | 0 | (0) |
| 2021 | Canterbury Bankstown | 14 | (4) |
| 2023 | Shellharbour FC | | |
| 2024– | South Coast Flame | 28 | (24) |
- * Club domestic league appearances and goals as of 4 December 2024 ‡ National team caps and goals as of January 1, 2015

Michael Trajkovski is an Australian professional footballer who plays a striker for Canterbury Bankstown.
