= 2019 National Premier Leagues Victoria =

7th season of the National Premier Leagues Victoria

National Premier Leagues Victoria
- Season: 2019
- Dates: 14 February – 15 September
- Matches: 182
- Goals: 614 (3.37 per match)
- Top goalscorer: Liam Boland (22 goals)

The 2019 National Premier Leagues Victoria was the sixth season of the National Premier Leagues Victoria, the top league in Victorian football. Heidelberg United were the defending champions, having won their first championship title the previous season.

== Teams ==
Fourteen teams competed in the league – the top twelve teams from previous season and the two teams promoted from the NPL Victoria 2. The promoted teams were Dandenong City from the Eastern conference and Altona Magic from the Western conference. They replaced Northcote City and Bulleen Lions.

=== Stadiums and locations ===
Note: Table lists in alphabetical order.

Team	Suburb	Stadium	Capacity
Altona Magic	Altona North	Paisley Park Soccer Complex	5,000
Avondale	Avondale Heights	City Vista Recreation Reserve	4,000
Bentleigh Greens	Cheltenham	Kingston Heath Soccer Complex	3,300
Dandenong City	Endeavour Hills	Frank Holohan Soccer Complex	4,000
Dandenong Thunder	Danedenong	George Andrews Reserve	5,000
Green Gully	St Albans	Green Gully Reserve	10,000
Heidelberg United	Heidelberg West	Olympic Village	12,000
Hume City	Broadmeadows	ABD Stadium	5,000
Kingston City	Clayton South	The Grange Reserve	1,000
Melbourne Knights	North Sunshine	Knights Stadium	1,000
Oakleigh Cannons	Oakleigh	Jack Edwards Reserve	5,000
Pascoe Vale	Coburg North	Hosken Reserve	1,325
Port Melbourne	Altona	SS Anderson Reserve	1,000
South Melbourne	Albert Park	Lakeside Stadium	15,000

== League table ==
Pos	Team	Pld	W	D	L	GF	GA	GD	Pts	Qualification or relegation
1	Heidelberg United	26	17	4	5	53	28	+25	55	Qualification for the 2019 National Premier Leagues Finals series
2	Oakleigh Cannons	26	13	6	7	45	32	+13	45	Qualification for the 2019 National Premier Leagues Victoria Finals series
3	Green Gully	26	12	8	6	55	40	+15	44	Qualification for the 2019 National Premier Leagues Victoria Finals series
4	Bentleigh Greens (C)	26	13	4	9	47	45	+2	43	Qualification for the 2019 National Premier Leagues Victoria Finals series
5	Hume City	26	12	5	9	41	37	+4	41	Qualification for the 2019 National Premier Leagues Victoria Finals series
6	Avondale	26	16	5	5	63	29	+34	35 (Note: Avondale were penalised 18 competition points.)	Qualification for the 2019 National Premier Leagues Victoria Finals series
7	Dandenong City	26	10	5	11	42	47	−5	35	
8	South Melbourne	26	10	4	12	27	42	−15	34	
9	Port Melbourne	26	8	7	11	41	37	+4	31	
10	Melbourne Knights	26	10	4	12	35	42	−7	31 (Note: Melbourne Knights were penalised three competition points.)	
11	Altona Magic	26	9	2	15	43	51	−8	29	
12	Dandenong Thunder	26	6	6	14	44	70	−26	24	Qualification for the 2019 Relegation play-offs
13	Kingston City (R)	26	6	5	15	35	51	−16	23	Relegation to the National Premier Leagues Victoria 2
14	Pascoe Vale (R)	26	6	3	17	33	53	−20	21	Relegation to the National Premier Leagues Victoria 2

Source: SportsTG
Rules for classification: 1) Points; 2) Goal difference; 3) Goals scored
(C) Champions; (R) Relegated

== Results ==
Home \ Away	ALT	AVO	BEN	DCY	DTH	GRE	HEI	HUM	KIN	MBK	OAK	PAS	PMS	SOU
Altona Magic	—	0–2	3–0	1–2	3–2	0–1	0–1	2–2	3–1	1–2	2–1	1–2	2–1	1–2
Avondale	3–0	—	1–2	0–0	6–2	1–2	2–3	3–0	2–1	2–1	3–1	3–1	1–0	4–0
Bentleigh Greens	2–1	0–3	—	1–0	1–3	3–1	0–3	2–0	2–2	4–0	3–2	3–1	3–2	3–1
Dandenong City	1–4	1–4	3–2	—	3–4	2–2	2–3	1–0	2–0	0–2	1–1	0–1	1–1	3–0
Dandenong Thunder	1–3	1–1	2–2	1–1	—	2–4	2–5	1–0	0–2	4–1	3–5	2–1	0–3	2–2
Green Gully	2–4	2–5	1–1	2–3	6–2	—	4–2	1–0	5–2	1–1	1–1	4–0	3–3	0–0
Heidelberg United	4–1	1–1	2–0	5–2	2–0	1–1	—	1–2	3–2	2–0	0–0	1–1	2–0	1–3
Hume City	2–0	1–1	0–2	5–1	3–0	1–3	1–2	—	1–5	3–1	1–0	2–1	1–0	3–1
Kingston City	1–2	1–3	3–4	1–3	1–3	0–4	1–0	1–1	—	2–0	1–1	0–2	1–2	1–0
Melbourne Knights	4–3	2–0	2–0	0–2	3–3	2–1	0–1	1–2	1–1	—	0–1	2–1	3–2	0–1
Oakleigh Cannons	1–0	4–3	3–0	3–1	1–3	3–0	2–1	1–1	3–2	1–2	—	1–0	1–1	4–1
Pascoe Vale	5–2	2–5	2–4	1–4	1–1	0–1	1–3	2–2	4–1	1–3	1–2	—	0–1	2–0
Port Melbourne	4–4	1–1	1–1	2–3	3–1	0–2	0–1	5–1	0–0	2–1	1–0	4–0	—	1–2
South Melbourne	2–0	0–3	3–2	1–0	3–0	1–1	0–3	0–2	0–2	1–1	0–2	1–0	2–1	—

Source: SportsTG
Legend: Blue = home team win; Yellow = draw; Red = away team win.

== Season statistics ==
=== Scoring ===
==== Top scorers ====
Rank	Player	Club	Goals
1	(Australia) Liam Boland	Avondale	22
2	(England) Alex Salmon	Green Gully	21
3	(Australia) Brandon Barnes	Dandenong Thunder	19
4	(Australia) Matthew Thurtell	Bentleigh Greens	15
5	(Australia) James Brown	Hume City	14
6	(Australia) Stefan Zinni	Avondale	12
7	(Australia) Harry White	Oakleigh Cannons	11
7	(Australia) Joe Guest	Oakleigh Cannons	11
7	(Australia) Sean Ellis	Heidelberg United	11
10	(New Zealand) Hamish Watson	Melbourne Knights	9
10	(Australia) Matthew Fletcher	Green Gully	9

=== Discipline ===
==== Player ====
- Most yellow cards: 10
  - (Australia) Matthew Reid (Avondale)
- Most red cards: 2
  - (Australia) James Kelly (Dandenong City)
  - (Australia) Jack Petrie (Heidelberg United)
