= George Howard (footballer) =

English-born Australian footballer

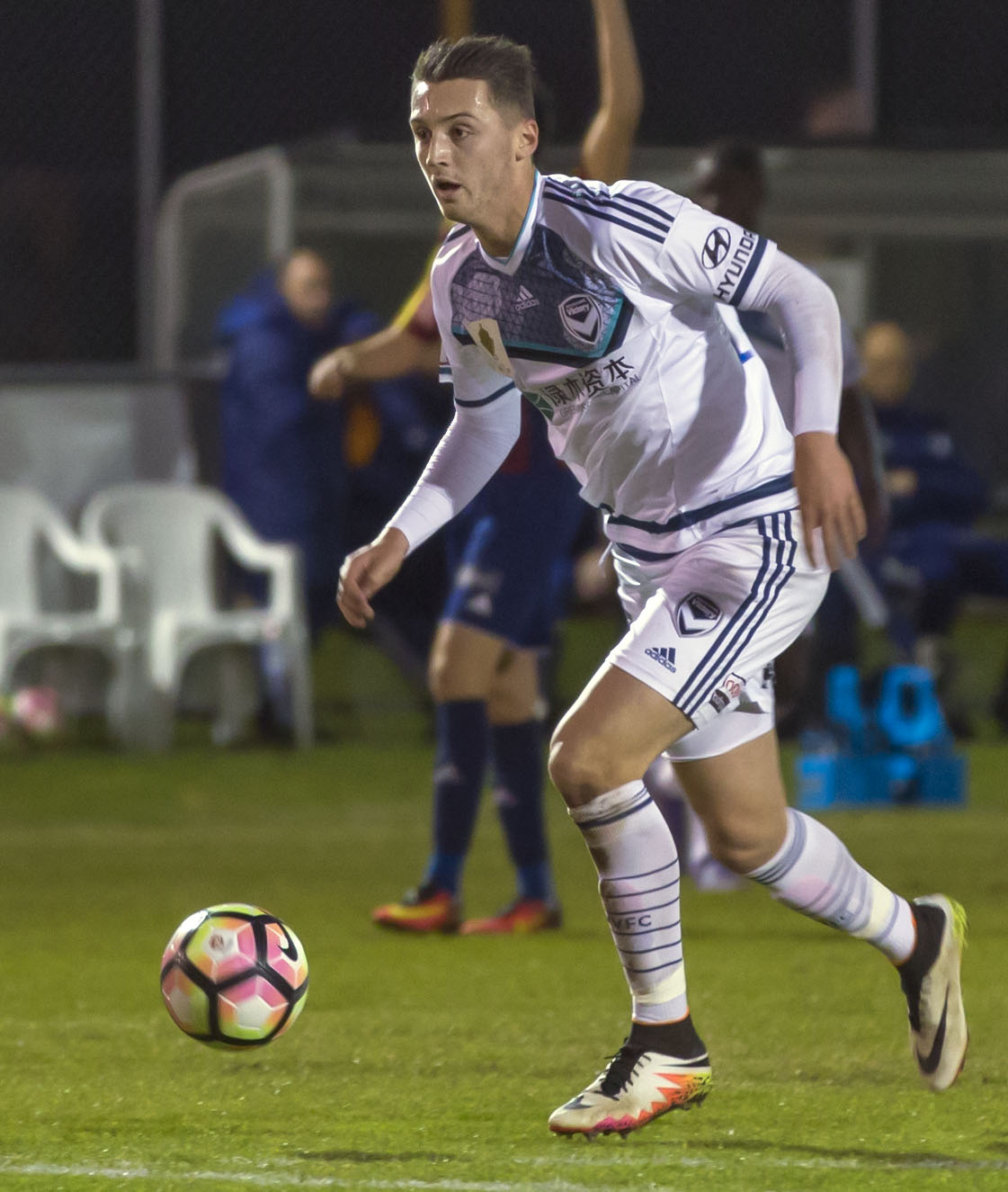
- Howard playing for Melbourne Victory in a friendly match against Port Melbourne, 9 August 2016

Personal information
- Full name: George Howard
- Date of birth: 8 October 1996 (age 30)
- Place of birth: England
- Height: 1.93 m (6 ft 4 in)
- Position: Striker

Team information
- Current team: Langwarrin SC

Youth career
- Sheffield United
- 2013: Eastern Lions
- 2014: Box Hill United
- 2015: Melbourne Victory

Senior career*
Years	Team	Apps	(Gls)
2013	Eastern Lions	5	(0)
2014	Box Hill United	11	(1)
2015–2017	Melbourne Victory NPL	35	(17)
2015–2017	Melbourne Victory	13	(1)
2018	APIA Leichhardt	9	(2)
2018	South Melbourne	12	(1)
2019	Hume City	7	(0)
2021–	Langwarrin SC	10	(0)
- * Club domestic league appearances and goals as of 8 September 2021 ‡ National team caps and goals as of March 28, 2015

George Howard (born 8 October 1996) is an English-born Australian professional footballer who plays as a striker.

== Club career ==
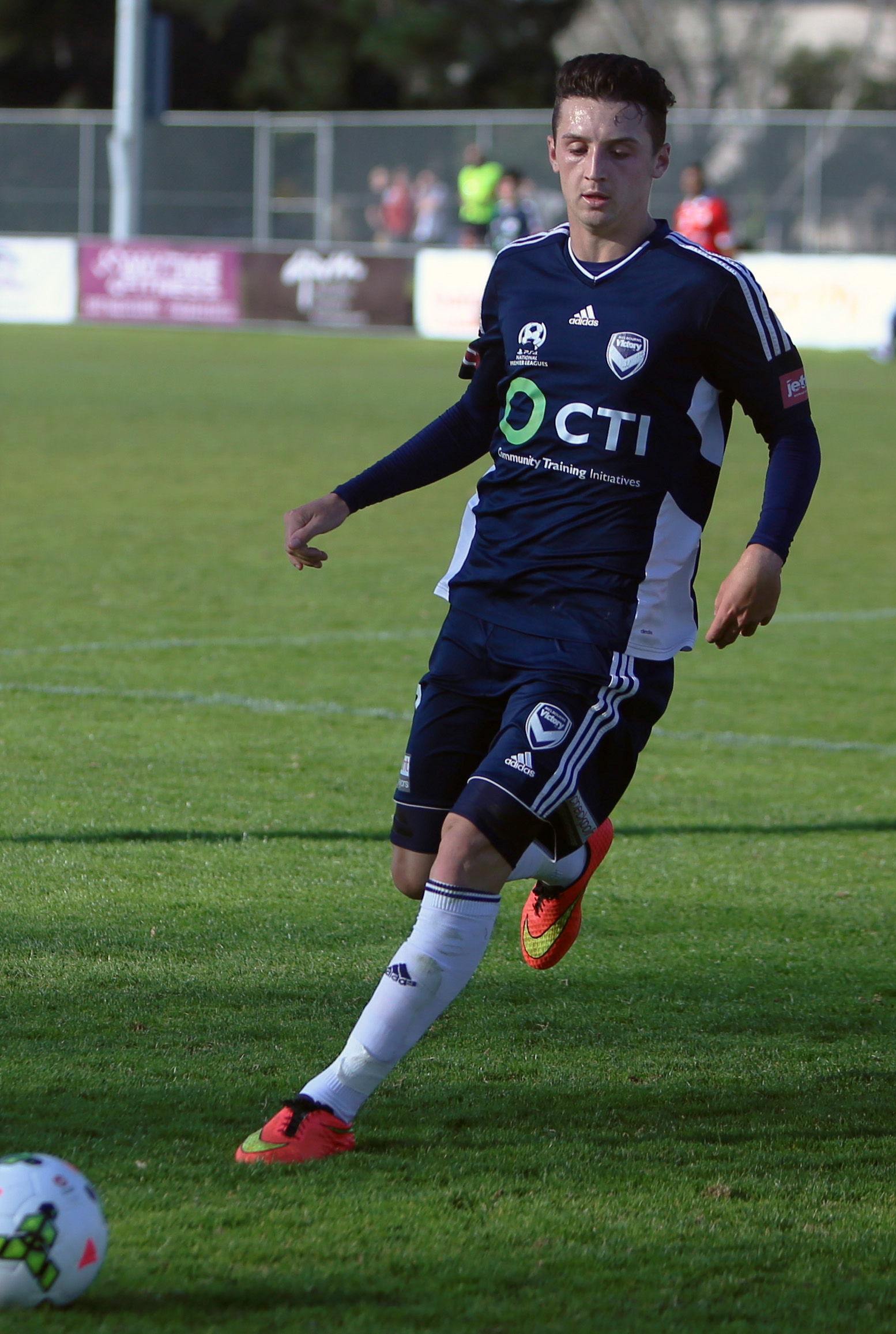
Howard playing for Melbourne Victory Youth in September 2015

George Howard moved to Australia with his family aged 1 or 15 from England where he had participated in the Sheffield United Academy, and was playing senior football for then fourth tier Victorian State League Division 1 side Eastern Lions by age 16. Howard joined National Premier Leagues Victoria 1 club Box Hill United in 2014, and was recruited to the Melbourne Victory Youth squad by Darren Davies in 2015. He trialled with the senior team in friendly games before the 2014–15 A-League season, scoring against Hume City. Howard made his senior A-League debut late in the 2014–15 season, replacing Archie Thompson against Central Coast Mariners on 27 March 2015. He won the NYL squad's Golden Boot award for 2014–15, with nine goals.

Howard was listed in the Melbourne Victory senior squad ahead of the 2015–16 season. He made his second A-League appearance replacing Besart Berisha seconds before the final whistle against Adelaide United on 9 October 2015.

Howard scored his first A-League goal in the 93rd minute of Melbourne Victory's Round 26 match against Wellington Phoenix on 2 April 2016.

On 12 May 2017, Howard left the Victory.
