= Roko Strika =

Australian soccer player

Personal information
- Full name: Roko Zvonimir Strika
- Date of birth: 12 February 1994 (age 32)
- Place of birth: Canberra, Australia
- Position: Winger

Youth career
- Belnorth United
- Monaro Panthers
- 2008–2011: ACTAS
- 2012–2013: Dinamo Zagreb

Senior career*
Years	Team	Apps	(Gls)
2013–2014	Maksimir	10	(3)
2014	HNK Gorica	7	(0)
2014–2015	Zagreb	2	(0)
2015	→ Zagreb II	13	(2)
2016–2017	Šibenik	2	(0)
2017	Imotski	13	(0)
2018	Canberra Olympic	7	(4)
2019–2022	Tigers FC	21	(6)
2022-2024	Monaro Panthers FC	48	(25)
- * Club domestic league appearances and goals as of 2 June 2026

Roko Strika (born 12 February 1994) is an Australian professional footballer who most recently played as a utility for Monaro Panthers FC.
