= Joey Katebian =

Australian soccer player

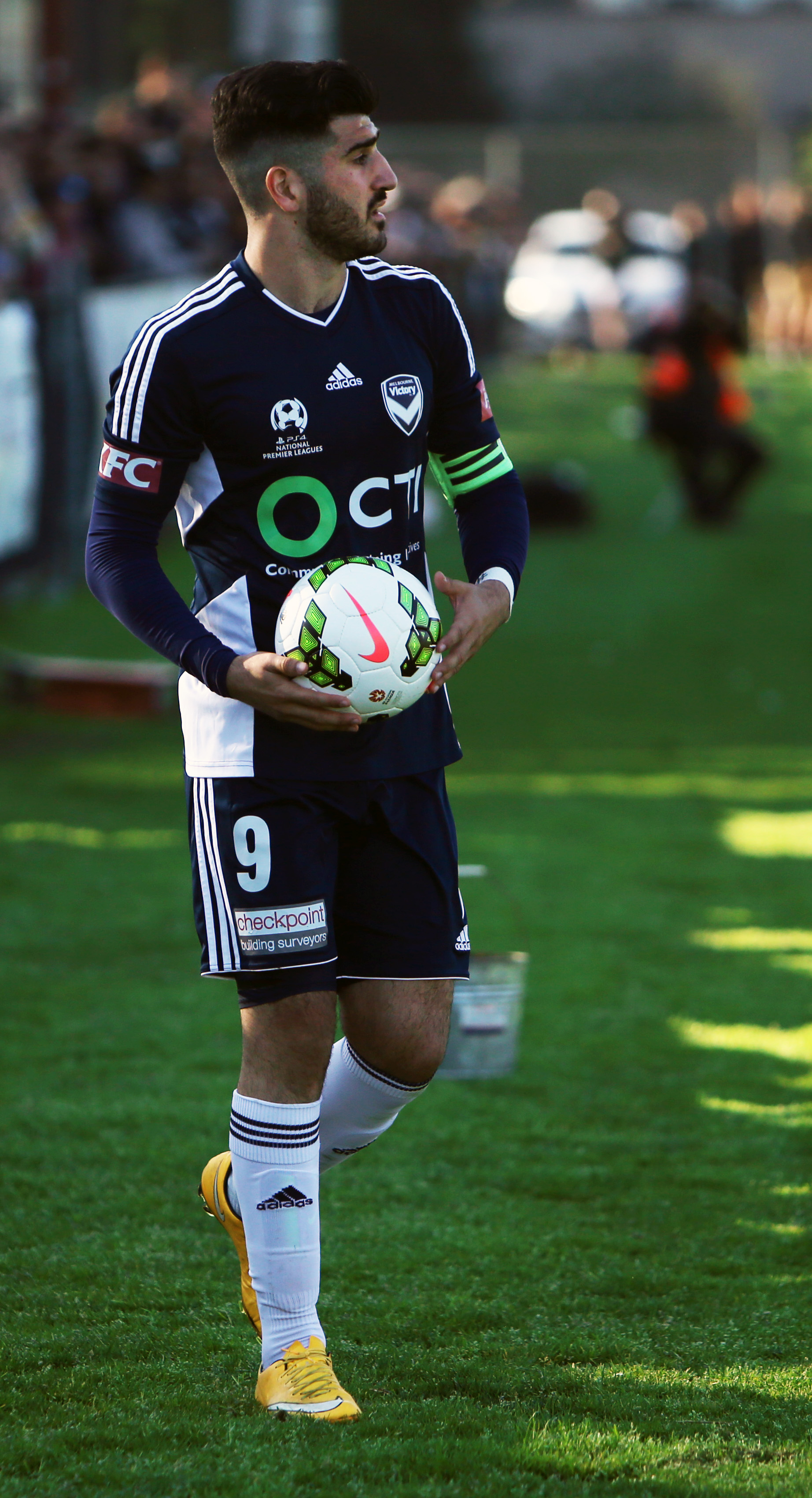
- Katebian playing for Melbourne Victory Youth, 26 September 2015

Personal information
- Full name: Joseph Katebian
- Date of birth: 9 November 1995 (age 31)
- Place of birth: Melbourne, Australia
- Position: Forward

Team information
- Current team: Avondale FC

Youth career
- 2006–2013: Bulleen Lions
- 2014–2016: Melbourne Victory

Senior career*
Years	Team	Apps	(Gls)
2013–2014	Bulleen	37	(27)
2014–2016	Melbourne Victory NPL	41	(40)
2015–2016	Melbourne Victory	1	(0)
2016–2017	Brisbane Roar	4	(0)
2017–	Avondale FC	131	(21)
- * Club domestic league appearances and goals as of 29 January 2025

Joseph Katebian (born 9 November 1995) is an Australian footballer who plays as a forward for NPL Victoria club Avondale.

== Early life ==
Katebian was born in Melbourne on 9 November 1995, to Lebanese Australian parents of distant Armenian origin.

Katebian played football from a young age for local club Bulleen Lions where he would later play for the senior squad. Katebian also played for Ivanhoe Grammar School's first eleven in his later years of high school, where he graduated in 2013.

== Club career ==
=== Youth career ===
Katebian spent his early years playing for FC Bulleen Lions in Melbourne's eastern suburbs, before joining Melbourne Heart Youth for the 2013–14 season. At the season's end, Katebian joined cross-town rivals Melbourne Victory, that he later captained in the National Premier Leagues Victoria, where he won the league's 2015 player's player of the year and golden boot awards. Katebian featured in the starting eleven players who defeated North Geelong Warriors on 26 September 2015, which promoted Melbourne Victory NPL Youth to the highest level of the National Premier Leagues Victoria.

=== Melbourne Victory ===
Katebian made his official competitive debut for the Melbourne Victory senior squad on 1 September 2015, in the 2015 FFA Cup round of 16 clash against Rockdale City Suns, coming on as a substitute in the 85th minute for Archie Thompson. His A-League debut came two months later on 19 November 2015, in the round five clash against Central Coast Mariners, substituted on for Gui Finkler in the 90th minute of the 2–1 victory at AAMI Park. On 31 May 2016, Katebian departed Melbourne Victory to pursue football opportunities abroad.

In June 2016, he went to Serbia for trials at FK Čukarički.

=== Brisbane Roar ===
On 5 August 2016, Katebian signed a one-year contract with Brisbane Roar, reuniting with John Aloisi who coached him at Melbourne Victory Youth. After managing just 27 minutes of A-League football, Katebian was released by the Roar.

=== Avondale FC ===
On 1 November 2017, it was announced that Katebian had joined Avondale FC.

== Career statistics ==
As of 21 September 2015

Club	Season	League		Cup		Continental		Other		Total	
Club	Season	Apps	Goals	Apps	Goals	Apps	Goals	Apps	Goals	Apps	Goals
Melbourne Victory	2015–16	1	0	1	0	0	0	0	0	2	0
Melbourne Victory	Total	1	0	1	0	0	0	0	0	2	0
A-League total		1	0	1	0	0	0	0	0	2	0

== Honours ==
With Melbourne Victory Youth:

- National Premier Leagues Victoria 1 Playoff Promotion Winners: 2015

Individual

- Melbourne Victory Youth Player's Player of the year: 2015
- Melbourne Victory Youth Youth medal: 2016
- National Premier Leagues Victoria 1 Player's Player of the year: 2015
- National Premier Leagues Victoria 1 Golden Boot: 2015
- National Youth League Golden Boot: 2015–16
