= Ryan Peterson (soccer, born 1996) =

Australian soccer player (born 1996)

Personal information
- Full name: Ryan Peterson
- Date of birth: 19 June 1996 (age 30)
- Place of birth: Australia
- Positions: Attacking midfielder; central midfielder; right back

Youth career
- 2008–2014: Blacktown City
- 2016–2017: Central Coast Mariners

College career
Years	Team	Apps	(Gls)
2017	Virginia Cavaliers	17	(1)

Senior career*
Years	Team	Apps	(Gls)
2015	Marconi Stallions	10	(0)
2015–2017	CCM Academy	37	(11)
2016–2017	Central Coast Mariners	1	(0)
2017	Northern Tigers	13	(9)
- * Club domestic league appearances and goals as of 29 September 2017

Ryan Peterson (born 19 June 1996) is an Australian professional footballer who plays college soccer for the University of Virginia.

He had previously played for the Central Coastal Mariners Academy and the Central Coast Mariners FC.
