= Antoni Trimboli =

Australian soccer player

Personal information
- Full name: Antoni Trimboli
- Date of birth: 30 July 1996 (age 30)
- Place of birth: Australia
- Position: Forward

Team information
- Current team: FK Beograd

Youth career
- –2012: Adelaide Comets
- 2012: SA NTC
- 2013: Eastern United
- 2014–2015: Perugia
- 2015–2016: Adelaide United

Senior career*
Years	Team	Apps	(Gls)
2013–2014	Eastern United	14	(1)
2015–2016	Adelaide United NPL	27	(13)
2015–2016	Adelaide United	2	(0)
2016	Adelaide Blue Eagles	7	(2)
2016–2017	Croydon Kings	14	(1)
2018	Adelaide Olympic	18	(2)
2018–2023	Croydon Kings	74	(12)
2023	Campbelltown City	21	(3)
2024–	FK Beograd	18	(3)
- * Club domestic league appearances and goals as of 19 September 2024

Antoni Trimboli (born 30 July 1996) is an Australian professional footballer who plays as a striker for Adelaide United. He'd previously played with Perugia in Italy.
