= Wade Dekker =

Sri Lankan football player

Personal information
- Full name: Wade Dekker
- Date of birth: 21 April 1994 (age 32)
- Place of birth: Melbourne, Victoria, Australia
- Height: 1.82 m (6 ft 0 in)
- Position: Striker

Team information
- Current team: Dandenong Thunder
- Number: 11

Youth career
- Northcote City
- 2013–2015: Melbourne City

Senior career*
Years	Team	Apps	(Gls)
2012–2014	Northcote City	23	(7)
2015	Melbourne City NPL	17	(10)
2015–2016	Melbourne City	5	(1)
2017	Green Gully	27	(13)
2018–2023	Oakleigh Cannons	128	(46)
2024–2026	Dandenong Thunder	47	(14)
2026–	Dandenong City	7	(2)

International career^{‡}
2024–	Sri Lanka	13	(2)
- * Club domestic league appearances and goals as of 18 Sep 2026 ‡ National team caps and goals as of 8 June 2026

Wade Dekker (born 21 April 1994) is a soccer player who plays as a striker for NPL Victoria club Dandenong Thunder. Born in Australia, he represents Sri Lanka internationally.

== Early life ==
Dekker was born in Melbourne, Australia to a Dutch father and a Sri Lankan Burgher mother.

== Club career ==
Wade grew up playing for Knox Churches SC in the VCFA league. On 25 August 2015, Dekker scored his first professional goal in only his 2nd professional game in a 5–1 win over Wellington Phoenix in the FFA Cup. On 10 October 2015 Dekker scored in his first A-League game, away against Sydney FC.

On 28 April 2016, Dekker was released by Melbourne City due to a long injury, then later made a comeback in football in March 2017.

== International career ==
Dekker joined the Sri Lanka national football team in April 2024. He made his debut for Sri Lanka against Brunei in June 2024.

Dekker scored his first international goal on 20 March 2025 in a friendly against Laos at the New Laos National Stadium.

== Career statistics ==
=== Club ===
As of Matches Played 18/9/2026

Appearances and goals by club, season and competition
Club	Season	League			Cup		Continental		Total	
Club	Season	Division	Apps	Goals	Apps	Goals	Apps	Goals	Apps	Goals
Northcote City FC	2014	NPL Victoria	19	7	0	0	-	-	19	7
Melbourne City FC Youth	2015	NPL1 West Victoria	17	10	0	0	-	-	17	10
Melbourne City FC	2015–16	A-League Men	5	1	3	1	-	-	6	1
Green Gully SC	2017	NPL Victoria	27	13	0	0	-	-	27	10
Oakleigh Cannons FC	2018	NPL Victoria	28	10	0	0	-	-	28	10
Oakleigh Cannons FC	2019	NPL Victoria	28	7	0	0	-	-	28	7
Oakleigh Cannons FC	2020	NPL Victoria	5	1	0	0	-	-	5	1
Oakleigh Cannons FC	2021	NPL Victoria	16	4	0	0	-	-	16	4
Oakleigh Cannons FC	2022	NPL Victoria	28	16	4	3	-	-	32	19
Oakleigh Cannons FC	2023	NPL Victoria	18	5	1	0	-	-	19	5
Dandenong Thunder FC	2024	NPL Victoria	19	7	0	0	-	-	19	7
Dandenong Thunder FC	2025	NPL Victoria	21	7	0	0	-	-	21	7
Dandenong Thunder FC	2026(Jan-Jun)	NPL Victoria	17	0	0	0	-	-	17	0
Dandenong City SC	2026(jun-	NPL Victoria	7	2	0	0	-	-	7	2
Career total			253	86	8	4	-	-	261	90
Goal to appearance ratio			0.34		0.50		-		0.34	

=== International ===
As of 8 June 2026

Appearances and goals by national team and year
National team	Year	Apps	Goals
Sri Lanka	2024	6	0
Sri Lanka	2025	6	1
Sri Lanka	2026	1	1
Total		13	2

=== International goals ===
Scores and results list Sri Lanka's goal tally first.

No.	Date	Venue	Opponent	Score	Result	Competition
1.	20 March 2025	New Laos National Stadium, Vientiane, Laos	Laos	1–0	2–1	Friendly
2.	8 June 2026	NT Stadium, Bangkok, Thailand	Bhutan	1–0	4–1	Friendly
