= Central Coast Mariners Centre of Excellence =

Australian football ground in Gosford, NSW

- Interactive map of Central Coast Mariners Centre of Excellence
- Address: 1 Bryant Drive
- Location: Tuggerah, New South Wales, Australia
- Coordinates: 33.3110°S 151.4225°E
- Capacity: 3,000
- Surface: Grass

Construction
- Groundbreaking: July 2011
- Opened: August 2014

Tenant
- Central Coast Mariners Academy

Website
- www.ccmariners.com.au

Mariners Centre of Excellence is the training ground and academy base of Central Coast Mariners, located in Tuggerah, Australia. It is used by the club's youth team and the Central Coast Mariners Academy as a training base and for matches, as well as by the club's senior team for training. The facility also has a stadium with a capacity of 3,000 people. The facility was purpose-built for the Central Coast-based club and is the club's home base.

== History ==
Work on the site commenced in 2011.

== Structure and facilities ==
The Mariners Centre of Excellence includes:

- 2 full-size grass pitches and a 3,000 seat grandstand
- 10 sports courts
- 1 heated aquatic and hydrotherapy centre
- 1 gymnasium
- 1 educational learning centre
- 1 medicine centre
- 1 event centre

== See also ==
- Adelaide United Training Centre
- City Football Academy (Melbourne, 2022)
- Sydney FC Centre of Excellence
