= Joe Knowles =

Australian soccer player (born 1996)

Personal information
- Full name: Joseph Knowles
- Date of birth: 10 July 1996 (age 30)
- Place of birth: Perth, Australia
- Height: 1.82 m (6 ft 0 in)
- Position: Winger

Team information
- Current team: Olympic Kingsway

Youth career
- ECU Joondalup
- 2014–2017: Perth Glory

Senior career*
| Years | Team | Apps | (Gls) |
| 2014–2018 | Perth Glory NPL | 66 | (25) |
| 2015–2018 | Perth Glory | 15 | (1) |
| 2018–2019 | Largs Thistle | 14 | (8) |
| 2019 | ECU Joondalup | 13 | (8) |
| 2019–2022 | Oakleigh Cannons | 48 | (24) |
| 2022–2023 | Brisbane Roar | 21 | (1) |
| 2023–2024 | Hyderabad | 11 | (0) |
| 2024– | Olympic Kingsway | 0 | (0) |
- * Club domestic league appearances and goals as of 08:08, 18 January 2024 (UTC)

Joseph Knowles (born 10 July 1996) is an Australian professional footballer who plays as a winger for Olympic Kingsway in the NPL WA.

== Club career ==
In January 2017, he was offered a senior contract for the 2017–18 season, while in May the club confirmed he signed it.

In 2018/19, Knowles played for 4 months with Scottish outfit Largs Thistle.

Before the 2022–23 A-League Men season, Knowles trialed for A-League Men club Brisbane Roar, scoring against Leeds United in a pre-season friendly. Knowles won a contract with the Brisbane Roar for that season, before being released at the end of that season.

On 15 July 2023, Indian Super League club Hyderabad completed the signing of Knowles on a one-year deal.
