= 2013–14 National Youth League (Australia) =

A-League National Youth League
- Season: 2013–14
- Premiers: Sydney FC Youth (2nd title)
- Matches: 90
- Goals: 395 (4.39 per match)
- Top goalscorer: Anthony Costa (14)
- Biggest home win: Sydney FC Youth 9–2 Perth Glory Youth (5 January 2014); Melbourne Victory Youth 8–1 AIS Football Program (15 February 2014)
- Biggest away win: Sydney FC Youth 1–7 Newcastle Jets Youth (23 February 2014)
- Highest scoring: Sydney FC Youth 9–2 Perth Glory Youth (5 January 2014); Melbourne Heart Youth 7–4 Brisbane Roar Youth (22 February 2014)
- Longest winning run: Sydney FC Youth (7)
- Longest unbeaten run: Sydney FC Youth (10)
- Longest winless run: Central Coast Mariners Youth (10)
- Longest losing run: Perth Glory Youth (7)

The 2013–14 A-League National Youth League (Also known as the Foxtel National Youth League for sponsorship reasons) was the sixth season of the Australian A-League National Youth League competition. The season ran alongside the 2013–14 A-League season. The schedule was released on 10 September 2013.

== Teams ==
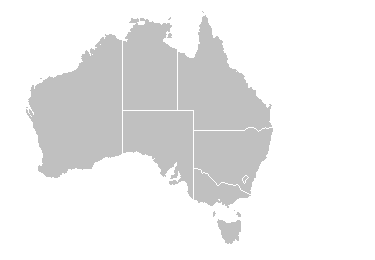

Team	Location	Home ground
Adelaide United Youth	Adelaide	Para Hills
AIS Football Program	Canberra	AIS Athletics Track
Brisbane Roar Youth	Brisbane	Goodwin Park
Central Coast Mariners Youth	Tuggerah	Central Coast Mariners Centre of Excellence
Melbourne Heart Youth	Melbourne	Epping Stadium
Melbourne Victory Youth	Melbourne	Lakeside Stadium
Newcastle Jets Youth	Newcastle	Wanderers Oval
Perth Glory Youth	Perth	Intiga Stadium
Sydney FC Youth	Sydney	Cromer Park
Western Sydney Wanderers Youth	Sydney	Cook Park

== Standings ==
Pos	Team	Pld	W	D	L	GF	GA	GD	Pts
1	Sydney FC Youth (C)	18	13	2	3	49	29	+20	41
2	Newcastle Jets Youth	18	11	4	3	50	29	+21	37
3	Melbourne Victory Youth	18	9	4	5	50	36	+14	31
4	Adelaide United Youth	18	9	3	6	41	36	+5	30
5	Melbourne Heart Youth	18	8	4	6	40	30	+10	28
6	Western Sydney Wanderers Youth	18	7	2	9	37	33	+4	23
7	Brisbane Roar Youth	18	6	5	7	41	45	−4	23
8	AIS Football Program	18	6	3	9	32	47	−15	21
9	Perth Glory Youth	18	5	0	13	35	67	−32	15
10	Central Coast Mariners Academy	18	1	3	14	20	43	−23	6

Source: au.soccerway.com
Rules for classification: 1) points; 2) goal difference; 3) number of goals scored.
(C) Champions

== Positions by round ==
Team ╲ Round	1	2	3	4	5	6	7	8	9	10	11	12	13	14	15	16	17	18
Sydney FC	2	1	1	1	1	1	1	1	1	1	1	1	1	1	1	1	1	1
Newcastle Jets	10	5	7	5	3	2	2	2	2	2	2	3	2	2	2	2	2	2
Melbourne Victory	4	3	2	2	2	4	5	4	4	3	3	2	3	4	3	3	3	3
Adelaide United	6	6	5	7	5	3	3	3	3	4	4	4	4	3	4	4	4	4
Melbourne Heart	2	2	4	4	7	8	8	8	8	8	8	7	8	8	7	7	5	5
Western Sydney Wanderers	8	8	9	9	8	6	6	7	5	6	5	6	5	6	5	6	7	6
Brisbane Roar	4	7	6	6	4	5	4	5	6	7	6	5	6	5	6	5	6	7
Australian Institute of Sport	1	4	3	3	6	7	7	6	7	5	7	8	7	7	8	8	8	8
Perth Glory	8	10	10	10	9	9	9	9	9	9	9	9	9	9	9	9	9	9
Central Coast Mariners	6	8	8	8	10	10	10	10	10	10	10	10	10	10	10	10	10	10

NOTES:

- Melbourne Heart were tied with Sydney FC at the end of Round 1, as were Brisbane Roar with Melbourne Victory, Adelaide United with Central Coast Mariners and Perth Glory with Western Sydney Wanderers.
- Central Coast Mariners were tied with Western Sydney Wanderers at the end of Round 2.

== Table of results ==
Home \ Away	ADE	AIS	BRI	CCM	MHT	MVC	NEW	PER	SYD	WSW
Adelaide United		3–5	1–3	4–2	0–0	2–1	1–0	4–2	4–1	3–1
Australian Institute of Sport	0–1		4–4	2–5	1–1	1–2	2–0	5–2	0–0	0–3
Brisbane Roar	4–3	0–2		0–0	1–2	3–3	2–2	2–7	3–2	2–1
Central Coast Mariners	0–0	0–1	1–1		0–2	3–4	1–3	0–3	1–2	2–3
Melbourne Heart	1–4	8–1	7–4	4–2		3–1	0–0	5–1	1–2	0–3
Melbourne Victory	5–2	4–1	5–2	5–2	2–0		1–2	4–1	2–2	4–1
Newcastle Jets	4–2	6–3	2–1	2–1	1–1	2–2		6–1	0–3	4–3
Perth Glory	1–4	2–4	0–5	2–0	0–1	5–2	2–6		0–3	4–1
Sydney FC	5–2	3–0	2–1	2–0	4–3	3–2	1–7	9–2		1–0
Western Sydney Wanderers	1–1	3–0	1–3	3–0	3–1	1–1	2–3	6–0	1–4	

Legend: Blue = home team win; Yellow = draw; Red = away team win.

== Matches ==
Round 1

26 October 2013	AIS Football Program	2–0	Newcastle Jets Youth	Canberra
15:00 AEDT	Gersbach 24'; Antoniou 72'	Report		Stadium: AIS Grass Fields

26 October 2013	Brisbane Roar Youth	3–3	Melbourne Victory Youth	Brisbane
14:30 AEST	Walker 53'; Hore 71'; Ingham 74'	Report	Nabbout 2', 68'; Karvelis 25'	Stadium: Goodwin Park

26 October 2013	Perth Glory Youth	0–1	Melbourne Heart Youth	Perth
15:00 AWST		Report	Kaya 33'	Stadium: Intiga Stadium

27 October 2013	Central Coast Mariners Youth	0–0	Adelaide United Youth	Tuggerah
10:30 AEDT		Report		Stadium: Central Coast Mariners Centre of Excellence; Attendance: 150; Referee: Stephen Lucas

27 October 2013	Sydney FC Youth	1–0	Western Sydney Wanderers Youth	Sydney
17:00 AEDT	Naumoff 90+2'	Report		Stadium: Cromer Park

Round 2

2 November 2013	Brisbane Roar Youth	1–2	Melbourne Heart Youth	Brisbane
14:30 AEST	Clut 73'	Report	Archibald 54'; Garuccio 90+4'	Stadium: Goodwin Park

3 November 2013	Perth Glory Youth	0–3	Sydney FC Youth	Perth
10:00 AWST		Report	Mallia 43'; Powell 53'; Urosevski 73'	Stadium: Intiga Stadium

3 November 2013	Melbourne Victory Youth	4–1	AIS Football Program	Melbourne
14:30 AEDT	J. Jeggo 5'; Nabbout 28', 58'; Duzel 75'	Report	Madden 78'	Stadium: Lakeside Stadium; Attendance: 100; Referee: Patrick Chaplin

3 November 2013	Western Sydney Wanderers Youth	1–1	Adelaide United Youth	Sydney
14:30 AEDT	Hanna 59'	Report	Elsey 57'	Stadium: Marconi Stadium

3 November 2013	Newcastle Jets Youth	2–1	Central Coast Mariners Youth	Newcastle
15:00 AEDT	Pavicevic 7'; Forbes 25' (o.g.)	Report	Curran 19'	Stadium: Wanderers Oval; Attendance: 200; Referee: Trent Nash

Round 3

9 November 2013	Central Coast Mariners Youth	1–2	Sydney FC Youth	Tuggerah
10:30 AEDT	Forbes 53'	Report	Tomelic 5'; Petkovski 56'; Burgess (red card) 77'	Stadium: Central Coast Mariners Centre of Excellence; Attendance: 80; Referee: Adam Gehrig

10 November 2013	Adelaide United Youth	1–0	Newcastle Jets Youth	Adelaide
10:30 ACDT	Cowburn 7' (o.g.)	Report		Stadium: Thebarton Oval; Referee: Rick Schneider

10 November 2013	AIS Football Program	5–2	Perth Glory Youth	Canberra
11:00 AEDT	Kalik 11' (pen.); Schmidt 18'; Warland 29'; Marino 63', 90+3'	Report	Pudler 69' (o.g.); Cosgrove 76'	Stadium: AIS Grass Fields; Referee: Luke Withell

10 November 2013	Western Sydney Wanderers Youth	1–3	Brisbane Roar Youth	Sydney
16:10 AEDT	D'Cunha 90+2'	Report	Brady 23'; Ingham 34', 84'	Stadium: Marconi Stadium

10 November 2013	Melbourne Victory Youth	2–0	Melbourne Heart Youth	Melbourne
17:45 AEDT	Nabbout 86'; Makarounas 90+1'	Report		Stadium: Lakeside Stadium; Attendance: 300; Referee: Alex Azcurra

Round 4

16 November 2013	Newcastle Jets Youth	6–1	Perth Glory Youth	Newcastle
10:00 AEDT	Bradbery 10'; Virgili 27', 62'; Waller 57'; Gibbs 81', 86'	Report	Knowles 12'	Stadium: Wanderers Oval

16 November 2013	AIS Football Program	1–1	Melbourne Heart Youth	Canberra
12:00 AEDT	Marino 90+3'	Report	Garuccio 68'	Stadium: AIS Grass Fields

16 November 2013	Sydney FC Youth	5–2	Adelaide United Youth	Wollongong
12:15 AEDT	Mallia 12', 48', 82'; MacDonald 32' (pen.); Zuvela 63'	Report	Costa 58' (pen.); Milesunic 80'	Stadium: WIN Stadium

16 November 2013	Central Coast Mariners Youth	1–1	Brisbane Roar Youth	Tuggerah
15:00 AEDT	Kwasnik 32'	Report	Sibatuara 68'	Stadium: Central Coast Mariners Centre of Excellence; Attendance: 150; Referee: Trent Nash

17 November 2013	Melbourne Victory Youth	4–1	Western Sydney Wanderers Youth	Melbourne
15:00 AEDT	J. Jeggo 40', 56'; Nabbout 71'; Stella 80'	Report	Hanna 61'	Stadium: Lakeside Stadium; Attendance: 70; Referee: Greg Gontscharow

Round 5

23 November 2013	Newcastle Jets Youth	6–3	AIS Football Program	Newcastle
11:00 AEDT	Virgili 14', 17', 73'; Oxborrow 20'; Bradbery 60'; Gibbs 90+3' (pen.)	Report	D. Smith 12'; Kalik 57', 75'	Stadium: Wanderers Oval

23 November 2013	Brisbane Roar Youth	3–2	Sydney FC Youth	Brisbane
10:30 AEST	Ferreira 21'; Borrello 28', 35'	Report	Mallia 52'; Tratt 77' (pen.)	Stadium: Goodwin Park

23 November 2013	Western Sydney Wanderers Youth	3–1	Melbourne Heart Youth	Sydney
15:00 AEDT	Hanna 18'; Barresi 62'; Sotirio 80'	Report	Espindola 1'	Stadium: Marconi Stadium

24 November 2013	Perth Glory Youth	2–0	Central Coast Mariners Youth	Perth
10:00 AWST	O'Neill 23' (pen.); O'Brien 37'	Report		Stadium: Percy Doyle Reserve

24 November 2013	Adelaide United Youth	2–1	Melbourne Victory Youth	Adelaide
14:30 ACDT	Kitto 45'; Costa 57'	Report	Stella 36'	Stadium: Thebarton Oval

Round 6

30 November 2013	Central Coast Mariners Youth	1–3	Newcastle Jets Youth	Tuggerah
10:30 AEDT	Kwasnik 68'	Report	Bradbery 15'; Pavicevic 35'; Cooper 90+2'	Stadium: Central Coast Mariners Centre of Excellence; Attendance: 150; Referee: Adrian Arndt

30 November 2013	Melbourne Heart Youth	1–4	Adelaide United Youth	Melbourne
14:00 AEDT	Cartanos 90'	Report	Melling 4'; Milesunic 22', 53'; O'Doherty 86'	Stadium: Epping Stadium; Attendance: 125; Referee: Patrick Chaplin

30 November 2013	AIS Football Program	0–3	Western Sydney Wanderers Youth	Canberra
15:00 AEDT	Rose (red card) 50'	Report	K. Appiah 50' (pen.), 56' (pen.); McGing 65'	Stadium: AIS Grass Fields; Referee: Luke Withell

1 December 2013	Brisbane Roar Youth	2–7	Perth Glory Youth	Brisbane
10:30 AEST	Theodore 50'; Borrello 64'	Report	Makeche 15', 88'; O'Brien 33'; Cernak 41'; Zahra 65', 86'; O'Neill 90+4'	Stadium: Goodwin Park

1 December 2013	Sydney FC Youth	3–2	Melbourne Victory Youth	Sydney
15:00 AEDT	Mallia 2', 45'; Urosevski 5'	Report	Cristaldo 31'; Proia 68'	Stadium: Cromer Park; Attendance: 350; Referee: Stephen Lucas

Round 7

7 December 2013	Adelaide United Youth	1–3	Brisbane Roar Youth	Adelaide
15:00 ACDT	Harvey (red card) 10'; Melling 66'	Report	Altundag 7'; Petratos 10' (pen.); Borrello 72'	Stadium: Thebarton Oval

8 December 2013	Perth Glory Youth	2–4	AIS Football Program	Perth
10:30 AWST	Makeche 8'; Jovic 88'	Report	Kalik 38'; D. Smith 46'; Antoniou 61'; Schmidt 70'	Stadium: Percy Doyle Reserve

8 December 2013	Sydney FC Youth	4–3	Melbourne Heart Youth	Wollongong
14:15 AEDT	Warren 14'; Tomelic 55'; Gameiro 70' (pen.), 80'	Report	Dugandžić 13' (pen.), 90+1'; Schroen 43'	Stadium: WIN Stadium; Attendance: 200; Referee: Lachlan Daniel

8 December 2013	Melbourne Victory Youth	1–2	Newcastle Jets Youth	Melbourne
14:30 AEDT	Stella 14'	Report	Gibbs 35'; Virgili 40'	Stadium: AAMI Park; Attendance: 800; Referee: Greg Gontscharow

8 December 2013	Western Sydney Wanderers Youth	3–0	Central Coast Mariners Youth	Blacktown
16:00 AEDT	Sotirio 31'; McGing 75'; Fofanah 90+2'	Report		Stadium: Blacktown Football Park

Round 8

14 December 2013	Western Sydney Wanderers Youth	1–4	Sydney FC Youth	Sydney
17:00 AEDT	Hanna 77'	Report	Gameiro 28'; Tomelic 64'; Petkovski 71'; MacDonald 86'	Stadium: Marconi Stadium

15 December 2013	Adelaide United Youth	4–2	Central Coast Mariners Youth	Adelaide
10:30 ACDT	Milesunic 59'; Costa 65'; Bladen 70'; Konstandopoulos 83'	Report	Kwasnik 11' (pen.); Griffiths (red card) 28'; Fitzgerald 44'; Neill (yellow card) 25' (red card) 75'	Stadium: Thebarton Oval; Referee: Kyle Bartlett

15 December 2013	Newcastle Jets Youth	1–1	Melbourne Heart Youth	Newcastle
10:30 AEDT	82'		39'; (red card) 52'	Stadium: Wanderers Oval

15 December 2013	AIS Football Program	4–4	Brisbane Roar Youth	Canberra
14:00 AEDT	D. Smith 8'; Marino 27'; Ochieng 48'; Jackson 70' (o.g.)	Report	Hore 13'; Altundag 23', 72'; Borrello 80'	Stadium: AIS Grass Fields

15 December 2013	Melbourne Victory Youth	4–1	Perth Glory Youth	Melbourne
15:00 AEDT	Cristaldo 32'; Miskulin 62'; Nabbout 64', 90+3'	Report	O'Neill 72'	Stadium: Lakeside Stadium

Round 9

21 December 2013	Sydney FC Youth	3–0	AIS Football Program	Sydney
14:00 AEDT	Urosevski 18'; Mallia 50'; Powell 70' (pen.)	Report		Stadium: Cromer Park

21 December 2013	Brisbane Roar Youth	2–2	Newcastle Jets Youth	Brisbane
14:00 AEST	Borrello 57', 61'	Report	Goodwin 45+2'; Cooper 49'	Stadium: Goodwin Park

21 December 2013	Perth Glory Youth	1–4	Adelaide United Youth	Perth
19:00 AWST	O'Brien 42'	Report	Golec 25'; Costa 35'; Kirk 73'; Kamau 74'	Stadium: Intiga Stadium; Referee: David Bruce

22 December 2013	Central Coast Mariners Youth	3–4	Melbourne Victory Youth	Tuggerah
14:30 AEDT	Whyte 17'; Bingham 25'; Griffiths 35'	Report	Makarounas 4'; Proia 37'; Murnane 51'; Cristaldo 57'	Stadium: Central Coast Mariners Centre of Excellence

22 December 2013	Melbourne Heart Youth	0–3	Western Sydney Wanderers Youth	Melbourne
15:00 AEDT		Report	Barresi 56'; Fofanah 68'; Andrijasevic 74' (o.g.)	Stadium: Epping Stadium; Attendance: 200; Referee: Patrick Chaplin

Round 10

4 January 2014	Adelaide United Youth	3–5	AIS Football Program	Adelaide
11:00 ACDT	Konstandopoulos 21'; Kamau 23'; Gersbach 45' (o.g.)	Report	D. Smith 14', 38'; Marino 48'; Ochieng 51'; Antoniou 85'	Stadium: Thebarton Oval

4 January 2014	Central Coast Mariners Youth	0–2	Melbourne Heart Youth	Tuggerah
14:30 AEDT		Report	Garuccio 13'; Schroen 38'	Stadium: Central Coast Mariners Centre of Excellence; Referee: Lachlan Daneil

5 January 2014	Sydney FC Youth	9–2	Perth Glory Youth	Sydney
11:00 AEDT	Tomelic 14'; Urosevski 27'; Mallia 27', 29'; McFlynn 42'; Powell 57', 62', 68', 72'	Report	Collard 68'; Risdon 86'	Stadium: Jubilee Oval

5 January 2014	Newcastle Jets Youth	4–3	Western Sydney Wanderers Youth	Newcastle
15:00 AEDT	Pavicevic 32'; Oxborrow 72'; Bradbery 76', 86'	Report	Olsen 77'; McGing 90'; Symons 90+2'	Stadium: Wanderers Oval

5 January 2014	Melbourne Victory Youth	5–2	Brisbane Roar Youth	Melbourne
15:00 AEDT	Nabbout 29', 65', 90+1'; Proia 67'; Stella 70'	Report	Murnane 18' (o.g.); Altundag 87'	Stadium: Lakeside Stadium; Attendance: 300; Referee: Alex Azcurra

Round 11

11 January 2014	AIS Football Program	2–5	Central Coast Mariners Youth	Canberra
15:00 AEDT	Rose 26'; Marino 73'	Report	Esposito 22'; Dixon 32'; Curran 44'; Morton 45+3'; Ferguson 56'	Stadium: AIS Grass Fields

12 January 2014	Western Sydney Wanderers Youth	6–0	Perth Glory Youth	Sydney
10:30 AEDT	Sotirio 16'; Cindric 33' (pen.), 39', 80', 86'; Perkatis 62'	Report		Stadium: Cook Park

12 January 2014	Brisbane Roar Youth	4–3	Adelaide United Youth	Brisbane
10:30 AEST	Borrello 63'; Ingham 68', 85', 90+3'	Report	Costa 21', 27', 87' (pen.); Elsey (yellow card) ?' (red card) 90'	Stadium: Goodwin Park

12 January 2014	Melbourne Heart Youth	3–1	Melbourne Victory Youth	Melbourne
15:00 AEDT	Mebrahtu 17'; Germano 55'; Schroen 67'	Report	Proia 90+3'	Stadium: Epping Stadium

12 January 2014	Newcastle Jets Youth	0–3	Sydney FC Youth	Newcastle
15:00 AEDT		Report	Calver 60'; Urosevski 86'; Mallia 90+2'	Stadium: Wanderers Oval

Round 12

18 January 2014	Perth Glory Youth	0–5	Brisbane Roar Youth	Perth
10:30 AWST	Castiello (red card) 12'; Barnett (yellow card) 40' (red card) 74'	Report	Ingham 13' (pen.), 78' (pen.); Borrello 20', 29'; Sibatuara 64'	Stadium: Intiga Stadium

18 January 2014	Adelaide United Youth	3–1	Western Sydney Wanderers Youth	Adelaide
10:30 ACDT	Costa 48', 62'; Mileusnic 74'	Report	Barresi 82'	Stadium: Thebarton Oval

18 January 2014	Melbourne Heart Youth	0–0	Newcastle Jets Youth	Melbourne
15:00 AEDT		Report		Stadium: Epping Stadium; Attendance: 200; Referee: Harley Natis

19 January 2014	AIS Football Program	1–2	Melbourne Victory Youth	Canberra
14:30 AEDT	Marino 9'; Kalik (yellow card) 22' (red card) 38'	Report	Proia 54'; MacLean 63'	Stadium: AIS Grass Fields

19 January 2014	Sydney FC Youth	2–0	Central Coast Mariners Youth	Sydney
17:45 AEDT	Mallia 33'; Naumoff 36'	Report		Stadium: Sydney United Sports Centre

Round 13

25 January 2014	Brisbane Roar Youth	0–2	AIS Football Program	Brisbane
10:30 AEST		Report	Marino 15'; Rose 81'	Stadium: Goodwin Park

25 January 2014	Perth Glory Youth	2–6	Newcastle Jets Youth	Perth
10:30 AWST	Makeche 12', 41'	Report	Bradbery 8', 31', 62'; Oxborrow 26'; Pavicevic 47'; Virgili 54'; Whiteside (yellow card) 61' (red card) 90+4'	Stadium: Intiga Stadium

26 January 2014	Adelaide United Youth	0–0	Melbourne Heart Youth	Adelaide
14:30 ACDT		Report		Stadium: Thebarton Oval

26 January 2014	Central Coast Mariners Youth	2–3	Western Sydney Wanderers Youth	Tuggerah
15:00 AEDT	Dixon 35'; Pandurevic 47'	Report	K. Appiah 6', 89'; Olsen 65'	Stadium: Central Coast Mariners Centre of Excellence

27 January 2014	Melbourne Victory Youth	2–2	Sydney FC Youth	Melbourne
15:00 AEDT	Cristaldo 54'; Proia 89'	Report	Burgess 26'; Powell 65'	Stadium: Lakeside Stadium

Round 14

1 February 2014	Perth Glory Youth	5–2	Melbourne Victory Youth	Perth
10:30 AWST	R. Edwards 59'; Maclaren 65', 80', 90+3'; Sam 75'	Report	Cristaldo 31'; J. Jeggo 77'	Stadium: Intiga Stadium

1 February 2014	Melbourne Heart Youth	1–2	Sydney FC Youth	Melbourne
15:00 AEDT	Mauk 5'	Report	MacDonald 43' (pen.); Urosevski 85'	Stadium: Epping Stadium

1 February 2014	Brisbane Roar Youth	0–0	Central Coast Mariners Youth	Brisbane
14:30 AEST		Report		Stadium: Goodwin Park

2 February 2014	AIS Football Program	0–1	Adelaide United Youth	Canberra
11:00 AEDT		Report	Costa 45'	Stadium: AIS Grass Fields

2 February 2014	Western Sydney Wanderers Youth	2–3	Newcastle Jets Youth	Sydney
18:00 AEDT	Hanna 17'; Fofanah 54'	Report	Virgili 32', 62'; Brown (red card) 49'; Cowburn 77'	Stadium: Campbelltown Stadium

Round 15

8 February 2014	Melbourne Heart Youth	5–1	Perth Glory Youth	Melbourne
10:30 AEDT	Kaya 6'; Espindola 19', 59'; Dao 43'; O'Dea 55'	Report	R. Edwards 28'	Stadium: Epping Stadium

8 February 2014	Western Sydney Wanderers Youth	3–0	AIS Football Program	Sydney
15:30 AEDT	Fofanah 7'; Cindric 34'; Perkatis 70'	Report		Stadium: Cook Park

8 February 2014	Newcastle Jets Youth	4–2	Adelaide United Youth	Newcastle
19:00 AEDT	Pavicevic 54', 80'; Bradbery 57'; Cowburn 87'	Report	Costa 9'; Mileusnic 61'	Stadium: Wanderers Oval

9 February 2014	Sydney FC Youth	2–1	Brisbane Roar Youth	Sydney
14:30 AEDT	Antonis 9'; Mallia 21'	Report	Sibatuara 57'	Stadium: Sydney United Sports Centre

9 February 2014	Melbourne Victory Youth	5–2	Central Coast Mariners Youth	Melbourne
15:00 AEDT	Cristaldo 20', 33', 40'; Makarounas 50', 90+2'	Report	Bingham 11', 31' (pen.)	Stadium: Lakeside Stadium; Attendance: 50; Referee: Harley Natis

Round 16

15 February 2014	Newcastle Jets Youth	2–2	Melbourne Victory Youth	Newcastle
10:30 AEDT	Pavicevic 13'; Bradbery 45+1'	Report	Proia 49', 80'	Stadium: Wanderers Oval

15 February 2014	Melbourne Heart Youth	8–1	AIS Football Program	Melbourne
14:30 AEDT	Schroen 5'; Mifsud 17', 34', 45'; Dao 73'; Andrijasevic 81'; Katebian 89'; Retre 90+3' (pen.)	Report	Madden 71'	Stadium: Epping Stadium; Attendance: 150; Referee: Patrick Chaplin

15 February 2014	Brisbane Roar Youth	2–1	Western Sydney Wanderers Youth	Brisbane
14:30 AEST	Borrello 37' (pen.); Ingham 58'	Report	McGing 45+3'	Stadium: Goodwin Park

15 February 2014	Adelaide United Youth	4–1	Sydney FC Youth	Adelaide
16:00 ACDT	Kitto 8'; Kamau 10'; Pollock 30', 49'	Report	Naumoff 90+2'	Stadium: Thebarton Oval

16 February 2014	Central Coast Mariners Youth	0–3	Perth Glory Youth	Lisarow
10:30 AEDT	B. Griffiths (red card) 45'; Verity (yellow card) ?' (red card) 90+1'	Report	Zahra 45' (pen.), 90+2'; Albano 87'	Stadium: Pluim Park; Referee: Lachlan Daniel

Round 17

22 February 2014	Central Coast Mariners Youth	0–1	AIS Football Program	Lisarow
10:30 AEDT	Esposito (yellow card) 28' (red card) 79'	Report	Kalik 16' (pen.)	Stadium: Pluim Park; Attendance: 80; Referee: Lachlan Daniel

22 February 2014	Melbourne Heart Youth	7–4	Brisbane Roar Youth	Melbourne
15:00 AEDT	Dao 39', 86'; Schroen 45'; Walker 64'; Mifsud 66'; Espindola 67' (pen.); Kaya 79'	Report	Clut 28'; Lustica 37'; Borrello 50'; Ingham 53'	Stadium: Epping Stadium

23 February 2014	Melbourne Victory Youth	5–2	Adelaide United Youth	Melbourne
10:00 AEDT	J. Jeggo 12'; Stella 37' (pen.); Pain 48'; Miskulin 66', 90+4'	Report	Bouzalas 17'; Kamau 89'	Stadium: Lakeside Stadium

23 February 2014	Perth Glory Youth	4–1	Western Sydney Wanderers Youth	Perth
10:00 AWST	Maclaren 24', 58', 60'; Zahra 90'	Report	Barresi 80'	Stadium: Intiga Stadium

23 February 2014	Sydney FC Youth	1–7	Newcastle Jets Youth	Wollongong
15:00 AEDT	Tratt (red card) 38'; Urosevski 82'	Report	Pavicevic 6', 51'; Brown 42', 83', 90+1'; Gibbs 45', 68'	Stadium: WIN Stadium

Round 18

1 March 2014	Adelaide United Youth	4–2	Perth Glory Youth	Adelaide
10:00 ACDT	Barker-Daish 29'; Costa 45', 63', 90+3'	Report	Knowles 21'; Vulin 77'	Stadium: Thebarton Oval

1 March 2014	Western Sydney Wanderers Youth	1–1	Melbourne Victory Youth	Sydney
15:00 AEDT	Olsen 23'; Alessi (yellow card) ?' (red card) 31'	Report	Proia 71'	Stadium: Cook Park

1 March 2014	Newcastle Jets Youth	2–1	Brisbane Roar Youth	Newcastle
16:00 AEDT	Bradbery 33' (pen.); Chapman 75'	Report	Ingham 45'	Stadium: Wanderers Oval

2 March 2014	Melbourne Heart Youth	4–2	Central Coast Mariners Youth	Melbourne
15:00 AEDT	O'Dea 4' (pen.), 10'; Retre 73'; Dao 74'	Report	G. Trifiro 6'; Dixon 90+2'	Stadium: Epping Stadium; Attendance: 200; Referee: Greg Gontscharow

2 March 2014	AIS Football Program	0–0	Sydney FC Youth	Canberra
15:00 AEDT		Report		Stadium: AIS Grass Fields; Attendance: 200; Referee: Luke Withell

== Season statistics ==
=== Top scorers ===
As of 2 March 2014

Rank	Player	Club	Goals
1	(Australia) Anthony Costa	Adelaide United Youth	14
2	(Australia) Mitchell Mallia	Sydney FC Youth	13
3	(Australia) Brandon Borrello	Brisbane Roar Youth	12
4	(Australia) Kale Bradbery	Newcastle Jets Youth	11
4	(New Zealand) Jai Ingham	Brisbane Roar Youth	11
4	(Australia) Andrew Nabbout	Melbourne Victory Youth	11
7	(Australia) Radovan Pavicevic	Newcastle Jets Youth	9
7	(Australia) Anthony Proia	Melbourne Victory Youth	9
7	(Australia) James Virgili	Newcastle Jets Youth	9
10	(Australia) Christopher Cristaldo	Melbourne Victory Youth	8
10	(Australia) Marc Marino	AIS Football Program	8
