= Ersin =

Ersin is a Turkish given name for males and a surname. Notable people with the name include:

== Given name ==
- Ersin Demir (born 1977), Turkish football player
- Ersin Destanoğlu (born 2001), Turkish football player
- Ersin Durgut (born 1982), Turkish volleyball player
- Ersin Erçin, Turkish diplomat
- Ersin Güreler (born 1978), Turkish football player
- Ersin Kalaycıoğlu, Turkish political scientist
- Ersin Kaya (born 1993), Australian football player
- Ersin Mehmedović (born 1981), Serbian football player
- Ersin Tacir (born 1985), Turkish race walker
- Ersin Tatar (born 1960), Turkish Cypriot politician and current president of Northern Cyprus

== Surname ==
- Fahir Ersin (1929–1988), Turkish journalist
- Nurettin Ersin (1918–2005), Turkish general
- Onur Ersin (born 1992), Turkish handballer

== See also ==
- Ersen, list of people with a similar name
