= Ersan =

Ersan is a Turkish given name for males. Notable people named Ersan include:

- Ersan Dogu, Turkish footballer
- Ersan Erdura, a Turkish singer
- Ersan Gülüm, Turkish footballer
- Ersan İlyasova, Turkish basketball player
- Ersan Keleş, Turkish-Belgian futsal player
- Ersan Şen (born 1966), Turkish lawyer and academic

== See also ==
- Ersen, list of people with a similar name
