= Brandon Borrello =

Australian footballer (born 1995)

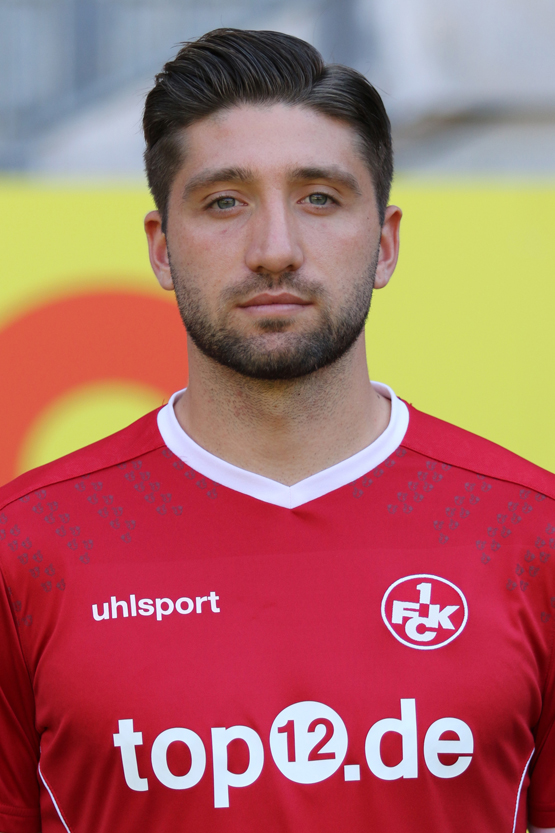
- Borrello with 1. FC Kaiserslautern in 2017

Personal information
- Full name: Brandon Joel Gaetano Borrello
- Date of birth: 25 July 1995 (age 31)
- Place of birth: Adelaide, Australia
- Height: 1.78 m (5 ft 10 in)
- Position: Right winger

Team information
- Current team: Western Sydney Wanderers
- Number: 26

Youth career
- Salisbury Villa
- Western Strikers
- Modbury Jets
- 2011–2014: Brisbane Roar

Senior career*
Years	Team	Apps	(Gls)
2013–2017	Brisbane Roar	71	(13)
2014–2017	Brisbane Roar NPL	5	(4)
2017–2018	1. FC Kaiserslautern	19	(3)
2017–2018	1. FC Kaiserslautern II	2	(0)
2018–2021	SC Freiburg II	9	(0)
2019–2021	SC Freiburg	7	(0)
2020–2021	→ Fortuna Düsseldorf (loan)	22	(1)
2021–2022	Dynamo Dresden	16	(0)
2022–	Western Sydney Wanderers	53	(19)

International career^{‡}
2014–2015	Australia U20	8	(1)
2015–2016	Australia U23	3	(0)
2019–	Australia	16	(2)
- * Club domestic league appearances and goals as of 9 January 2025 ‡ National team caps and goals as of 10 July 2025

Brandon Joel Gaetano Borrello (Italian: [ɡaeˈtaːno borˈrɛllo]; born 25 July 1995) is an Australian professional association football player who plays as a right winger for A-League club Western Sydney Wanderers and the Australia national team.

Borrello moved to Brisbane in 2011 where he played for Brisbane Roar, for whom he made his A-League Men debut in November 2013. In the following seasons, he established himself in the first-team and as one of Brisbane's most potent attackers, helping his side towards qualifications in both the A-League Finals Series and AFC Champions League. Borrello eventually moved to Germany where he remained for 5 years before moving back to Australia with Western Sydney Wanderers in July 2022.

== Early life ==
Borrello was born on 25 July 1995 in Adelaide, Australia, to parents of Italian heritage, and grew up in Salisbury Downs. He began his football journey playing for local clubs in the Adelaide area, including Salisbury United, Salisbury Villa, Western Strikers, and Modbury Jets. From a young age, Borrello and his family avidly followed the "Socceroos" matches, fostering his passion for the sport. From then on, representing Australia on the international stage became his childhood dream.

Borrello's initial football development took place at Salisbury Villa and later continued at the Royal Park-based Western Strikers, where he joined at the age of nine. Despite being part of the South Australian Sports Institute (SASI) program, in 2011, Borrello's family relocated to Brisbane when Borrello was offered a soccer scholarship at the Queensland Academy of Sport that provided top-tier training facilities and coaching to further his development as a player.

In his high school years, Borrello attended St Columban's College and graduated from the college in 2013.

== Club career ==
=== Brisbane Roar ===
==== 2013–2015 ====
In late October 2013, Borrello received his first call-up to the A-League squad for Brisbane Roar ahead of the clash against Melbourne Hearts on 3 November. He made his senior debut on the day, coming off the bench in the 74th minute, where Brisbane won 3–0 at Suncorp Stadium. Leading up to April 2014, Borrello still played within the youth squad for the A-League Youth tournemount where he was named NYL Player of the Year by the end of the 2013–14 season.

Ahead of the 2014–15 season, Borrello would find a place within the first team following the absence of Besart Berisha who was out with an injury. On 8 November 2014, Borrello scored his first goal for the club where his lost 3–1 at home to Sydney FC. On 4 March 2015, he scored his first AFC Champions League goal, netting the only goal in the 2nd minute, in a 1–0 win over Urawa Reds, handing them their second consecutive defeat in the group stage. Four days later, Borrello scored the winning goal, his second that same week, in a league tie against Western Sydney Wanderers where he contributed to a 1–0 victory to put his club on 6th place in the league table and into finals contention. Following his decisive performances, Borrello was named March Nominee for Young Footballer of the Year.

Borrello was named as one out of five Young Footballer of the Year nominees at the end of the league season, but lost the award to Adelaide United's midfielder James Jeggo.

==== 2015–2017 ====
On 18 October 2015, Borrello scored twice to secure a 2–1 victory over Central Coast Mariners. Two rounds later, he scored two goals again, including a stoppage-time brace, to seal a 3–0 win against Adelaide United. By early November, Borrello contributed to a third of Brisbane's total goals, scoring 4 goals in 7 appearances and earning him the October nominee for the Hyundai A-League's NAB Young Footballer of the Year award. His lethal form in front of goal led his coach John Aloisi to give Borrello a permanent starting-position over Henrique on the wing, and tipped him for success into becoming a full Australian international in the future.

On 27 December, Borrello scored his 5th goal of the season in a 3–1 win over Melbourne City. Following the match, Borrello didn't score for the remainder of the campaign and finished the season with 5 goals in 22 appearances. He missed out on the Young Footballer of the Year award for a second time, coming short of teammate Jamie Maclaren. On 10 February 2016, Borrello signed a two-year contract (his first professional contract) with Brisbane Roar. In the subsequent season, following a poor league start due to Maclaren's dip in form, Borrello scored the winning goal in Brisbane's 2–1 win against Perth Glory on 30 October 2016, to give his side their second win out of five rounds. However, for the next months, he found himself sitting on the bench, due to hamstring problems, leading him to lose a starting place within the squad.

After recovering by December, on 21 January 2017, Borrello retained his starting place and continued to contribute, earning Man of the match after assisting the winner to Maclaren, in a crucial 1–0 win over Wellington Phoenix to bring them eight points behind Melbourne Victory who sat second. His performance was described as brilliant by Aloisi, whilst Borrello afterwards stated it was “just a snippet of what’s to come”. On 30 January, in an AFC Champions League play-off match, Borrello scored a record 4 goals, the most scored by any A-League player, in a 6–0 thrashing against Global at Suncorp Stadium. In the next round, Borrello provided an assist and the winning goal, most notably in Carlos Tevez's debut, in a 2–0 away victory over Shanghai Shenhua, helping his side qualify to the group stage. He was nominated in January 2017 for the Young Footballer of the Year award for the 2016–17 season.

=== 1. FC Kaiserslautern ===
On 26 May 2017, it was announced that Borrello had signed a three-year deal with 2. Bundesliga side 1. FC Kaiserslautern after his buyout clause was triggered. However, his initial months with the club saw him mostly sitting on the bench during the league campaign.

It wasn't until 9 September 2017 that Borrello made his club debut, coming off the bench in the 57th minute in a 2–1 loss against Holstein Kiel at Holstein-Stadion. Despite making his debut, Borrello struggled to find consistent playing time under manager Jeff Strasser and only managed to make three appearances by the end of October, leading him to be delegated to the U23 team. Borrello's fortunes changed when he replaced Nicklas Shipnoski in the starting lineup and earned his first start for the club on 3 November 2017 against Bochum.

Under new manager Michael Frontzeck, following the departure of Strasser due to health problems, Borrello established himself as a regular starter within his system and on 28 February 2018, he scored his first goal for the club in a 2–1 away win against Darmstadt. The following match on 2 March, Borrello showcased an outstanding individual display against Union Berlin, when he scored the opening goal in the fifth minute, a volley from outside the box, putting his side 1–0 up. Later in the match, he won his side a penalty and provided an assist to contribute to a thrilling 4–3 victory for Kaiserslautern. His impressive performances drew attention, and he was even considered a potential candidate for the 2018 World Cup Australia squad by the media. However, he was ultimately overlooked by coach Bert van Marwijk in the final selection.

On 24 April, during a training session, Borrello suffered a cruciate ligament rupture in his right knee that ruled him out for the remainder of the season. Following Kaiserslautern's relegation to the 3. Liga (the third division of German football) at the end of the season, Borrello looked to depart the club and finished his campaign with 3 goals and 8 assists in 19 league appearances.

=== SC Freiburg ===
On 23 July 2018, Borrello made a move to the Bundesliga club SC Freiburg, for an undisclosed transfer fee, although some reports stated it was on free due to Borrello's working paper expiring sooner with Kaiserslautern than its initial date in June 2020. In terms of the contract, Borrello was not paid by the club at the time whilst he was rehabilitating and was instead paid by the employers' liability insurance association for the first few months. He did not play any competitive football or participated in training sessions until February 2019 when he started training with the second team (U23s).

==== 2018–2020: Comeback and Bundesliga debut ====
Continuing his progress and working towards a full recovery, Borrello featured for the U23 team for the remainder of the season. He made his competitive return on 21 February 2019 in a regional league match against TSV Steinbach. Borrello gradually increased his involvement with the U23s and by 13 April, he had made 6 appearances for the team where he had played the full 90 minutes in the last matches against Elversberg and Astoria Walldorf respectively. By the end of the season, Borrello had amassed a total of 9 league appearances solely with the second team.

The following season marked Borrello's return to training with the first team, and in a symbolic gesture of his comeback, he shaved off his trademark beard. On 17 August, he finally made his long-awaited Bundesliga debut, starting in a 3–1 win against Mainz. In the early stages of the season, Borrello made 7 league appearances for SC Freiburg, with 4 of them being starts, helping the team accumulate 26 points in the league table. However, due to his relative inexperience and the need for further improvement at the top level, Borrello was eventually dropped from the squad by coach Christian Streich. Nonetheless, Borrello remained with the team for the 2020–2021 season and participated in the training camp in Austria to gain first-team experience before the possibility of loan offers was considered as part of his development.

==== 2020–2021: Loan to Fortuna Düsseldorf ====
On 1 September 2020, Borrello joined 2. Bundesliga side Fortuna Düsseldorf on a one-year loan deal. Just five days later, he made his unofficial debut in an exhibition match against Paderborn, where he provided an assist for the winning goal. His competitive debut for Fortuna Düsseldorf came on 12 September in a DFB Pokal tie against Ingolstadt, which his team won 1–0. Throughout the majority of the campaign, Borrello primarily made appearances off the bench. However, his performances garnered criticism from fans and media regarding his effectiveness in attack. Coach Uwe Rösler defended Borrello, stating, “I have no understanding for that. He is an absolute team player and has an enviable character.”

On 7 March 2021, Borrello played a crucial role, contributing with an assist in a 3–1 victory against Nürnberg to help his side close the gap for a top 4 finish. This performance marked his first significant contribution after initially finding it challenging to adapt as a substitute. Subsequently, on 3 May, Borrello scored his first goal for the club just five minutes after coming on as a substitute in a 3–2 win against Karlsruher SC at the Merkur Spiel-Arena. Fortuna Düsseldorf finished the season in 5th place, with Borrello's performances excelling during the final phase of the campaign. Borrello returned to SC Freiburg following the expiration of his loan on 24 May.

=== Dynamo Dresden ===
On 3 July 2021, Brandon Borrello signed a two-year contract with newly promoted 2. Bundesliga club Dynamo Dresden, in a deal worth £390,000 per year, for an undisclosed transfer fee.

After promising performances in his first three starts for the club, Borrello was voted Man of the match after an impressive display in a DFP Pokal tie against Paderborn. On 10 August, he suffered an injury during a training duel, leading him to seek immediate medical attention. After undergoing a thorough examination at the Carl Gustav Carus University Hospital in Dresden, he was diagnosed with a metatarsal fracture on his left foot. He made his return on 21 November, in a 1–0 win against his former side Fortuna Düsseldorf at Rudolf-Harbig-Stadion.

In a match against Heidenheim on 19 February 2022, Borrello came on as a substitute in the 46th minute but was forced to leave the field in the 84th minute due to behavioural issues on the pitch. His coach, Alexander Schmidt, openly criticised him for his unprofessionalism, stating, "I'm not talking around it," adding, "he had the wrong shoes. You can't accept that, he should have gone out and changed his shoes." On 24 May 2022, Borrello played in the relegation play-off final against his former club, Kaiserslautern where Dynamo Dresden suffered relegation as Kaiserslautern won the tie 2–0 on aggregate. Following the club's relegation, Borrello was among the four players who departed the team just one week after the relegation fixture.

=== Western Sydney Wanderers ===
On 25 July 2022, Borrello made his return to the A-League, signing a two-year contract with Western Sydney Wanderers. On 28 October 2022, he scored his first league goal since 2017 in a 2–0 victory against the Newcastle Jets, extending the Wanderers' unbeaten streak at the start of the season.

However, Borrello's season was not without controversy. Following a 1–0 defeat to Sydney FC in the Sydney Derby on 11 February 2023, he expressed frustration with his team's performance, particularly highlighting his belief that Sydney FC did not deserve the win and commented towards the end, "It’s hard not to sound like a sore loser, but bang average". His comments drew criticism from Sydney FC fans but garnered attention from the media who praised it.

On 25 February, Borrello scored his 6th goal in 9 appearances in the Wanderers' 4–0 victory over Macarthur. In the following match against Macarthur on 8 April, he scored twice, including a 95th-minute brace that brought his goal tally for the season to 10. The game ended in a 2–2 draw at Campbelltown Stadium. On 21 April, Borrello scored in his 100th A-League appearance in a convincing 4–0 win against Wellington Phoenix at CommBank Stadium.

Borrello finished his debut season as the top goalscorer for the Wanderers, registering 13 goals and 5 assists. His performances earned him recognition at the Western Sydney Wanderers' end-of-year ceremony, where he received six awards, including the Rod Allen Award for Media Player of the Year, the Isuzu UTE A-League Members Player of the Year, the Isuzu UTE A-League Golden Boot, and the Isuzu UTE A-League Player of the Year. On 5 June, Borrello received the Alex Tobin Medal for the 2022–23 season coming out on top ahead of Melbourne City's Mathew Leckie and Sydney FC's marquee man Joe Lolley.

Borrello's second campaign with the Wanderers was impacted by injury, with a foot fracture sustained during the Sydney Derby in round 5 ruling him out for 3 months.

== International career ==
=== Youth ===
In September 2014, Borrello received his first call-up to the Australia U20 team for the AFC U19 Championship in Myanmar. He scored in the first game against the United Arab Emirates, helping Australia secure a 1–1 draw on 10 October. He made a further two appearances in the group stage before Australia failed to qualify for the AFC U19 Championships knockout stages, finishing 3rd, resulting in their absence from the FIFA U20 World Cup.

Borrello's next international appearance came for the Australia U23 team, initially during a training camp, before the AFC U-23 Championship in 2016. He made two appearances in the tournament as Australia finished in 3rd place, mirroring Borrello's previous Asian tournament experience, this time falling short of qualifying for the Olympics.

=== Senior ===
In May 2018, Borrello received his first call-up to the senior Australia national team for a friendly against South Korea on 7 June 2019. He made his debut in the 70th minute, replacing Awer Mabil, as his side suffered a 1–0 defeat by full-time in Busan. Borrello earned his 2nd cap on September 10, in a 3–0 World Cup qualifier victory against Kuwait. Despite being considered a fringe player, he went on to make his 3rd and 4th caps in matches against Chinese Taipei on 15 October (7–1) and 7 June 2021 (5–1), respectively.

After a 13-month absence from international duty, Borrello made his return to Australia in the two friendly matches against Ecuador. In the first match on 24 March, he came on in the second half before Australia won 3–1 at CommBank Stadium. In the second match on 28 March 2023, he scored his first international goal, opening the scoring for his team before succumbing to a 2–1 defeat to La Tri at Marvel Stadium.

Shortly after Borrello's return to the national team, he sustained a fractured foot while playing for Western Sydney Wanderers, ruling him out for the 2023 AFC Asian Cup.

== Style of play ==
Brandon Borrello is a wide attacker known for his strength and direct running at defenders. While primarily deployed as a winger, Borrello is also capable of playing as a striker.

During his time with Brisbane Roar, Borrello was often positioned on the right side of attack in a 4-3-3 formation. He excelled in this role, utilising his speed and composure in front of goal to contribute to the team's attacking play. When deployed on the wing, Borrello showcases his dribbling skills by cutting inside from the right and delivering accurate crosses to create scoring opportunities for his teammates.

In his stint with Freiburg, Borrello initially played as a right-winger before being converted to a no. 10 role. This versatility demonstrates his ability to adapt to different positions and contribute effectively to the team's style of play. Similarly, during his loan spell with Fortuna Düsseldorf, Borrello predominantly operated as a right winger, utilising his attacking prowess from wide areas.

Upon joining Western Sydney Wanderers, Borrello was transformed into a striker by head coach Marko Rudan, following Sulejman Krpić departure after failing to lead the attack for the Wanderers. This change in position highlighted Borrello's movement, positivity, and willingness to go forward, bringing a unique set of attributes to the frontline, including technical ability, sharp shooting, and consistent energy off the ball. His work rate and pressing ability make him particularly effective against a 2-chain CB pair and a single pivot, disrupting the opposition's defensive structure and creating opportunities for the attacking midfielders to exploit.

== Personal life ==
=== Family and relationship ===
During his younger years, Borrello worked at the family business, gaining valuable experience in the food industry. Additionally, Borrello's uncle is a junior coach with Western Strikers in Royal Park, Adelaide.

Borrello is married to Kristina Petrovic who is from Germany. The couple shares a love for spending time at the beach, with Borrello being particularly fond of surfing. Notably, Borrello is fluent in German.

=== Education ===
In 2015, while playing football with Brisbane Roar, Borrello enrolled in a bachelor of a business degree at Griffith University, a public research university in South East Queensland on the east coast of Australia. This opportunity was made possible through the partnership between Griffith University and Brisbane Roar, allowing Borrello to pursue his studies while continuing his football career. As a member of the Griffith Sports College, Borrello received support to balance his academic pursuits and training, ultimately working towards obtaining a degree.

== Career statistics ==
=== Club ===
As of 1 July 2019

Appearances and goals by club, season and competition
Club	Season	League (Note: Appearances in A-League final series)			Cup		Continental (Note: Appearances in AFC Champions League)		Total	
Club	Season	Division	Apps	Goals	Apps	Goals	Apps	Goals	Apps	Goals
Brisbane Roar	2013–14	A-League	6	0	—		—		6	0
Brisbane Roar	2014–15	A-League	22	4	1	0	6	2	29	6
Brisbane Roar	2015–16	A-League	22	5	1	0	—		23	5
Brisbane Roar	2016–17	A-League	25	4	1	0	7	5	33	9
Brisbane Roar	Total		75	13	3	0	13	7	91	20
1. FC Kaiserslautern	2017–18	2. Bundesliga	19	3	1	0	—		20	3
SC Freiburg	2018–19	Bundesliga	0	0	0	0	—		0	0
SC Freiburg	2019–20	Bundesliga	0	0	0	0	—		0	0
SC Freiburg	Total		0	0	0	0	0	0	0	0
Career total			94	16	4	0	13	7	111	23

=== International ===
As of match played 5 June 2025

Appearances and goals by national team and year
National team	Year	Apps	Goals
Australia	2019	3	0
Australia	2020	0	0
Australia	2021	1	0
Australia	2022	0	0
Australia	2023	7	2
Australia	2024	2	0
Australia	2025	3	0
Total		16	2

List of international goals scored by Brandon Borrello
No.	Date	Venue	Opponent	Score	Result	Competition
1	28 March 2023	Marvel Stadium, Melbourne, Australia	Ecuador	1–0	1–2	Friendly
2	16 November 2023	Melbourne Rectangular Stadium, Melbourne, Australia	Bangladesh	2–0	7–0	2026 FIFA World Cup qualification

== Honours ==
Brisbane Roar

- A-League Premiership: 2013–14

Individual

- Y-League BRFC Player of the Year: 2013–14
- PFA A-League Team of the Season: 2022–23
