= Jai Ingham =

Australian footballer

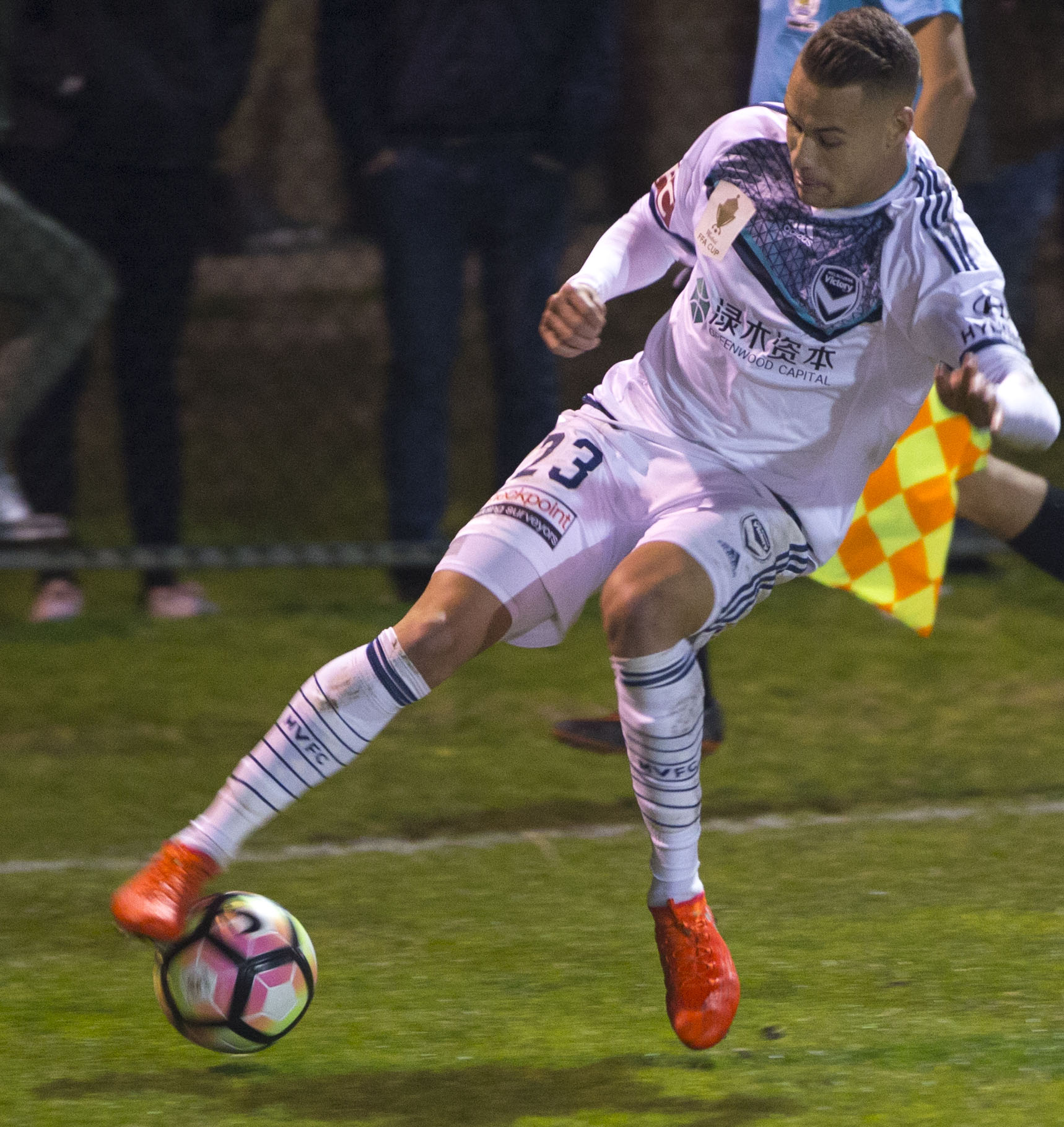
- Ingham playing for Melbourne Victory in a friendly match against Port Melbourne, 9 August 2016

Personal information
- Full name: Jai Emile Mau'u Ingham
- Date of birth: 14 August 1993 (age 33)
- Place of birth: Lismore, New South Wales, Australia
- Height: 1.80 m (5 ft 11 in)
- Position: Winger

Team information
- Current team: Malvern City
- Number: 10

Youth career
- 2013–2014: Brisbane Roar

Senior career*
Years	Team	Apps	(Gls)
2012–2013	Olympic FC	23	(14)
2013–2014	Brisbane Roar NPL	11	(13)
2014–2015	Brisbane Roar	1	(0)
2015–2016	Hume City	26	(9)
2016–2019	Melbourne Victory	52	(4)
2019	Central Coast Mariners	0	(0)
2019–2021	Brisbane Roar	12	(0)
2021	United City	0	(0)
2021–2022	Gold Coast Knights	0	(0)
2022–2023	South Melbourne	28	(2)
2023–	Malvern City	69	(18)

International career^{‡}
2017–	New Zealand	4	(0)
- * Club domestic league appearances and goals as of 18 April 2026 ‡ National team caps and goals as of 24 December 2018

Jai Emile Mau'u Ingham (born 14 August 1993) is a professional footballer who plays a winger for Victorian Premiere League 2 club Malvern City. Born in Australia and of New Zealand and Samoan descent, Ingham has represented the New Zealand internationally.

== Career ==
=== Olympic FC ===
Ingham started his career with Olympic FC seniors in the National Premier League while training to be an electrician. In July 2013, he was picked as one of Australia's top eight players outside the A-League. Selected in the QLD NPL football team of the year 2013.

=== Brisbane Roar ===
At the beginning of the 2013–14 National Youth League, Ingham joined Brisbane Roar's youth side. Scoring 13 goals in 11 appearances. Including a second half hat-trick that secured victory over Adelaide.

On 24 January 2014, Ingham debuted for the senior team, coming on as a substitute in the 72nd minute of a 2–1 victory over Wellington Phoenix.

=== Hume City ===
Ingham drew positive reactions while at National Premier Leagues Victoria side Hume City during the 2015 FFA Cup.

=== Melbourne Victory ===
Ingham trained with Melbourne Victory for a month ahead of the 2016 January transfer window and was signed as the club's first use of the Mature Age Rookie salary cap allowance. Ingham made his debut for Melbourne Victory against the Central Coast Mariners on 8 January 2016, coming on as a 77th-minute substitute for Fahid Ben Khalfallah in an eventual 3–3 draw.

Ingham made his first start for Melbourne Victory in their opening 2016 AFC Champions League match against Shanghai SIPG F.C. on 24 February 2016, in what was only his third appearance for the club. During the match, he scored his first goal for the club, scoring in the 31st minute in an eventual 2–1 win. He then went on to make his first A-League starting appearance on 6 March against the Central Coast Mariners, setting up both Besart Berisha and Fahid Ben Khalfallah for goals and was voted best on ground in a 2–0 win at Central Coast Stadium. Ingham scored the equaliser against Juventus FC in a pre-2016–17 A-League season friendly match at the MCG. Ingham scored his first A-League goal for Melbourne Victory on 12 November 2016, against the Western Sydney Wanderers, in an eventual 3–0 win.

Ingham has an impressive AFC Champions League record for Melbourne Victory with 9 appearances 3 goals and 1 assist. Due to this Fox Sports commentator Andy Harper gave him the nickname "The Asian Specialist," after his third goal in Asian Champions League against Chinese giants Guangzhou Evergrande, 22 April 2019.

Ingham was released by Melbourne Victory at the conclusion of the 2018–19 A-League season.

=== Central Coast Mariners ===
In June 2019, Ingham joined Central Coast Mariners on a two-year contract among a host of signings under new coach Alen Stajcic.

=== Return to Brisbane Roar ===
In August 2019, less than 2 months after signing with Central Coast Mariners, Ingham negotiated a mutual contract release with the club and joined Brisbane Roar. In March 2021, Ingham departed Brisbane Roar.

=== United City ===
Ingham signed a contract with Philippines Football League side United City as one of their foreign players and the final player in a slew of new signings. This came a few hours after it was announced that Brisbane Roar and Ingham had mutually agreed to terminate the player's contract.

=== Malvern City ===
After a solitary season with NPL Victoria side South Melbourne FC in 2022, Ingham joined Victorian State League 1 South-East side Malvern City for the 2023 season.

He was also announced as the club's MiniRoos technical director in 2024.

== International career ==
In May 2016, Ingham was named to the Samoan national squad for the 2016 OFC Nations Cup however he did not travel to Papua New Guinea for the tournament and was listed as an absentee.

In March 2017, Ingham was called up to the New Zealand national squad for World Cup qualifiers, along with his brother Dane. He made his debut on 28 March 2017 against Fiji.

== Personal life ==
Jai is the cousin of Samoan international Johnny Hall and brother of player Dane Ingham who currently playing in Malaysia top-flight league Sabah F.C.. In addition to holding an Australian passport, Ingham also holds Samoan and New Zealand passports, as he has a Samoan-New Zealand mother and an Australian father.

== Honours ==
Melbourne Victory

- A-League Championship: 2017–18
