= 2018–19 Y-League =

Y-League
- Season: 2018–19
- Champions: Brisbane Roar Youth (1st title)
- Matches: 41
- Goals: 141 (3.44 per match)
- Top goalscorer: Moudi Najjar (7 goals)
- Biggest home win: Brisbane Roar Youth 6–0 Melbourne Victory Youth (23 December 2018)
- Biggest away win: Perth Glory Youth 0–3 Melbourne City Youth (24 November 2018); Canberra United 0–3 Sydney FC Youth (20 January 2019)
- Highest scoring: Brisbane Roar Youth 6–0 Melbourne Victory Youth (23 December 2018)
- Longest winless run: 8 matches Canberra United
- Longest losing run: 7 matches Canberra United
- Highest attendance: 1,061; Western Sydney Wanderers Youth vs. Brisbane Roar Youth (1 February 2019)
- Lowest attendance: 65; Melbourne Victory Youth vs. Brisbane Roar Youth (25 January 2019)
- Average attendance: 226

The 2018–19 Y-League season (also known as the 2018–19 Foxtel Y-League season for sponsorship reasons) was the eleventh season of the Australian Y-League, the premier national competition for youth football in the country.

== Teams ==
The competition featured the same ten teams as the previous season:

=== Conference A ===
Conference A contains teams from outside of New South Wales and the Australian Capital Territory.

Locations of the 2018–19 Y-League Conference A teams

Team	Home city	Home ground
Adelaide United Youth	Adelaide	Marden Sports Complex
Brisbane Roar Youth	Brisbane	Logan Football Complex
Melbourne City Youth	Melbourne	CB Smith Reserve
Melbourne Victory Youth	Melbourne	Epping Stadium
Perth Glory Youth	Perth	Dorrien Gardens

=== Conference B ===
Conference B contains teams from New South Wales and the Australian Capital Territory.

Locations of the 2018–19 Y-League Conference B teams

Team	Home city	Home ground
Central Coast Mariners Academy	Gosford	Central Coast Mariners Centre of Excellence
Canberra United	Canberra	Deakin Stadium
Newcastle Jets Youth	Newcastle	Newcastle No.2 Sportsground
Sydney FC Youth	Sydney	Lambert Park
Western Sydney Wanderers Youth	Sydney	Marconi Stadium / Valentine Sports Park

=== Managerial changes ===
Team	Outgoing manager	Manner of departure	Date of vacancy	Replaced by	Date of appointment	Table
Canberra United	Ryan Grogan			Dean Ugrinic	4 May 2018	Pre-season
Central Coast Mariners Academy	Wayne O'Sullivan	Completion of tenure	18 April 2018	Ray Junna	8 November 2018	Pre-season

== Standings ==
Conference A
Pos	Team	Pld	W	D	L	GF	GA	GD	Pts	Qualification
1	Brisbane Roar Youth (C)	8	5	1	2	19	8	+11	16	Qualification to the Grand Final
2	Melbourne City Youth	8	5	1	2	19	14	+5	16	
3	Perth Glory Youth	8	3	2	3	14	14	0	11	
4	Adelaide United Youth	8	3	1	4	15	17	−2	10	
5	Melbourne Victory Youth	8	1	1	6	8	22	−14	4	

Source: Y-League
(C) Champions

Conference B
Pos	Team	Pld	W	D	L	GF	GA	GD	Pts	Qualification
1	Western Sydney Wanderers Youth	8	6	0	2	15	8	+7	18	Qualification to the Grand Final
2	Sydney FC Youth	8	5	0	3	15	8	+7	15	
3	Central Coast Mariners Academy	8	5	0	3	14	12	+2	15	
4	Newcastle Jets Youth	8	3	1	4	14	14	0	10	
5	Canberra United Youth	8	0	1	7	4	20	−16	1	

Source: Y-League

== Results ==
Conference A
Home \ Away	ADE	BRI	MCY	MVC	PER
Adelaide United Youth		2–1	1–2	3–2	2–1
Brisbane Roar Youth	2–2		2–0	6–0	2–1
Melbourne City Youth	3–2	1–3		4–1	3–3
Melbourne Victory	2–1	0–2	2–3		1–1
Perth Glory Youth	4–2	2–1	0–3	2–0	

Legend: Blue = home team win; Yellow = draw; Red = away team win.

Conference B
Home \ Away	CAN	CCM	NEW	SYD	WSW
Canberra United Youth		2–3	1–1	0–3	0–1
Central Coast Mariners Academy	2–1		1–3	0–2	0–2
Newcastle Jets Youth	2–0	1–3		0–2	5–1
Sydney FC Youth	4–0	0–3	3–2		0–1
Western Sydney Wanderers Youth	4–0	1–2	3–0	2–1	

Legend: Blue = home team win; Yellow = draw; Red = away team win.

=== Positions by round ===
Conference A
Team ╲ Round	1	2	3	4	5	6	7	8	9	10
Brisbane Roar Youth	5	2	1	3	1	1	1	1	1	1
Melbourne City Youth	3	5	4	2	3	4	2	2	2	2
Perth Glory Youth	2	1	3	4	5	3	4	3	3	3
Adelaide United Youth	1	2	1	1	2	2	3	4	4	4
Melbourne Victory Youth	4	4	5	5	4	5	5	5	5	5

Conference B
Team ╲ Round	1	2	3	4	5	6	7	8	9	10
Western Sydney Wanderers Youth	3	2	4	3	2	1	1	1	1	1
Sydney FC Youth	1	1	1	1	1	2	2	3	3	2
Central Coast Mariners Academy	2	4	2	4	4	4	3	2	2	3
Newcastle Jets Youth	5	3	3	2	3	3	4	4	4	4
Canberra United Youth	4	5	5	5	5	5	5	5	5	5

== Fixtures ==
The season fixtures were announced on 22 October 2018.

=== Conference A ===
Round 1

10 November 2018	Perth Glory Youth	2–1	Brisbane Roar Youth	Perth
10:30 AWST	Seldon 18'; Bukuru 44'	Report	Wellsmore 89'	Stadium: Dorrien Gardens; Attendance: 150; Referee: Adrien Liechti

10 November 2018	Adelaide United Youth	3–2	Melbourne Victory Youth	Adelaide
16:30 ACDT	D'Arrigo 64'; Armiento 75'; Carpenter 90+3'	Report	Said 19'; Sette 85'	Stadium: Marden Sports Complex; Attendance: 417; Referee: Nick Elagin

Round 2

17 November 2018	Melbourne Victory Youth	1–1	Perth Glory Youth	Melbourne
10:30 AEDT	Said 71'	Report	Ostler 27'	Stadium: Lakeside Stadium; Attendance: 100; Referee: Jake Keating

17 November 2018	Brisbane Roar Youth	2–0	Melbourne City Youth	Brisbane
15:00 AEST	Muratovic 59', 69'	Report		Stadium: Lions Stadium; Attendance: 200; Referee: Zijad Ahmetovic

Round 3

24 November 2018	Perth Glory Youth	0–3	Melbourne City Youth	Perth
10:30 AWST		Report	Najjar 19'; Pierias 86'; Leader 90' (o.g.)	Stadium: Dorrien Gardens; Attendance: 203; Referee: Shane Skinner

25 November 2018	Brisbane Roar Youth	2–2	Adelaide United Youth	Ipswich
15:00 AEST	Leck 63'; Brady 87'	Report	Beric 6'; Niyongabire 85'	Stadium: Eric Evans Reserve; Attendance: 500; Referee: Zijad Ahmetovic

Round 4

1 December 2018	Melbourne City Youth	4–1	Melbourne Victory Youth	Melbourne
16:30 AEDT	Najjar 21', 57' (pen.); Metcalfe 26', 84'	Report	Said 58'	Stadium: CB Smith Reserve; Attendance: 200; Referee: Rhys Shelmerdine

2 December 2018	Adelaide United Youth	2–1	Perth Glory Youth	Adelaide
10:30 ACDT	Nunn 22'; Farah 63' (o.g.)	Report	Popovic 87'	Stadium: Marden Sports Complex; Attendance: 310; Referee: Nick Elagin

Round 5

8 December 2018	Brisbane Roar Youth	2–1	Perth Glory Youth	Brisbane
10:30 AEST	Brady 19'; Muratovic 25'	Report	Harold 8' (pen.)	Stadium: Lions Stadium; Attendance: 252; Referee: Zijad Ahmetovic

8 December 2018	Melbourne Victory Youth	2–1	Adelaide United Youth	Melbourne
17:00 AEDT	Said 12'; Clark 25' (o.g.)	Report	K. Konstandopoulos 57' (pen.)	Stadium: Marvel Stadium; Attendance: 125; Referee: Seun Yinka-Kehinde

Round 6

15 December 2018	Melbourne City Youth	1–3	Brisbane Roar Youth	Melbourne
15:30 AEDT	Najjar 27'	Report	Cavallo 14' (o.g.); Leck 45'; Muratovic 74'	Stadium: CB Smith Reserve; Attendance: 100; Referee: Jake Keating

16 December 2018	Perth Glory Youth	2–0	Melbourne Victory Youth	Perth
10:30 AWST	Stynes 6'; Hore 55'	Report		Stadium: Dorrien Gardens; Attendance: 100; Referee: Shane Skinner

Round 7

23 December 2018	Brisbane Roar Youth	6–0	Melbourne Victory Youth	Brisbane
10:30 AEST	Duncan 3'; L. Brooks 14'; Leck 16', 20', 34'; Muratovic 43'	Report		Stadium: Logan Football Complex; Attendance: 100; Referee: Max Crane

23 December 2018	Melbourne City Youth	3–2	Adelaide United Youth	Melbourne
16:00 AEDT	Pierias 37'; Colakovski 53'; Najjar 76'	Report	Armiento 23', 24'	Stadium: CB Smith Reserve; Attendance: 150; Referee: Yoav Fisher

Round 8

5 January 2019	Melbourne Victory Youth	2–3	Melbourne City Youth	Melbourne
09:30 AEDT	Palazzolo 15'; Kamsoba 25'	Report	Colakovski 37'; Goulding 46' (o.g.); Iannucci 64'	Stadium: Epping Stadium; Attendance: 225; Referee: Jake Keating

5 January 2019	Perth Glory Youth	4–2	Adelaide United Youth	Perth
10:30 AWST	Selden 29'; Stynes 54', 77' (pen.); E. Brooks 78'	Report	Niyongabire 66'; Gomulka 79'	Stadium: Dorrien Gardens; Attendance: 80; Referee: Shane Skinner

Round 9

19 January 2019	Adelaide United Youth	2–1	Brisbane Roar Youth	Adelaide
19:00 ACDT	Armiento 45+2' (pen.); Irabona 74'	Report	D'Arrigo 73' (o.g.)	Stadium: Marden Sports Complex; Attendance: 100; Referee: Shane Skinner

20 January 2019	Melbourne City Youth	3–3	Perth Glory Youth	Melbourne
16:00 AEDT	Najjar 13', 31'; Najjarine 24'	Report	Stynes 16' (pen.); Brooks 20'; Popovic 90'	Stadium: CB Smith Reserve; Attendance: 150; Referee: Rhys Shelmerdine

Round 10

25 January 2019	Melbourne Victory Youth	0–2	Brisbane Roar Youth	Melbourne
16:00 AEDT		Report	Brady 45'; Leck 80' (pen.)	Stadium: Epping Stadium; Attendance: 65; Referee: Yoav Fisher

25 January 2019	Adelaide United Youth	1–2	Melbourne City Youth	Adelaide
16:00 ACDT	Stamatelopoulos 3'	Report	Vidošić 17'; Pierias 85'	Stadium: Marden Sports Complex; Attendance: 333; Referee: Nick Elagin

=== Conference B ===
Round 1

10 November 2018	Canberra United Youth	2–3	Central Coast Mariners Academy	Canberra
18:30 AEDT	Clarkson 3'; Barbatano 62'	Report	Vinci 53'; Macdonald 86'; Wiley 90' (o.g.)	Stadium: Deakin Stadium; Attendance: 400; Referee: Joel Ralston

11 November 2018	Newcastle Jets Youth	0–2	Sydney FC Youth	Newcastle
16:30 AEDT		Report	Tilio 34', 66'	Stadium: Adamstown Oval; Attendance: 236; Referee: Hassan Jomaa

Round 2

17 November 2018	Central Coast Mariners Academy	1–3	Newcastle Jets Youth	Tuggerah
10:30 AEDT	Kekeris 61'	Report	Tipaldo 71', 90'; Cowburn 75'	Stadium: Central Coast Mariners Centre of Excellence; Attendance: 100; Referee: Jarryd McFarlane

17 November 2018	Canberra United Youth	0–1	Western Sydney Wanderers Youth	Canberra
18:30 AEDT		Report	Roberts 90+1' (pen.)	Stadium: Deakin Stadium; Attendance: 600; Referee: Nathan Shakespear

Round 3

24 November 2018	Sydney FC Youth	4–0	Canberra United Youth	Sydney
16:30 AEDT	Ivanovic 5', 45'; Lamberton 54'; Van Meurs 56'	Report		Stadium: Lambert Park; Attendance: 100; Referee: Hassan Jomaa

24 November 2018	Western Sydney Wanderers Youth	1–2	Central Coast Mariners Academy	Sydney
16:30 AEDT	Puflett 90+2'	Report	Berry 60'; Mourdoukoutas 78' (o.g.)	Stadium: Marconi Stadium; Attendance: 300; Referee: Jarryd McFarlane

Round 4

1 December 2018	Newcastle Jets Youth	2–0	Canberra United Youth	Maitland
16:30 AEDT	K. Petratos 22' (pen.); Harrison 78'	Report		Stadium: Maitland No. 2 Sportsground; Attendance: 120; Referee: Stuart Hansen

2 December 2018	Sydney FC Youth	0–1	Western Sydney Wanderers Youth	Sydney
10:30 AEDT		Report	Peterson 23' (pen.)	Stadium: Lambert Park; Attendance: 200; Referee: Jarryd McFarlane

Round 5

8 December 2018	Western Sydney Wanderers Youth	3–0	Newcastle Jets Youth	Sydney
19:30 AEDT	Agamemnonos 21'; Scott 51'; Russell 73'	Report		Stadium: Valentine Sports Park; Attendance: 150; Referee: Joel Ralston

9 December 2018	Central Coast Mariners Academy	0–2	Sydney FC Youth	Tuggerah
16:30 AEDT		Report	Glassock 51' (o.g.); Tilio 77'	Stadium: Central Coast Mariners Centre of Excellence; Attendance: 180; Referee: Hassan Jomaa

Round 6

15 December 2018	Central Coast Mariners Academy	0–2	Western Sydney Wanderers Youth	Tuggerah
10:30 AEDT		Report	Puflett 9'; Monge 39'	Stadium: Central Coast Mariners Centre of Excellence; Attendance: 181; Referee: Jarryd McFarlane

20 January 2019	Canberra United Youth	0–3	Sydney FC Youth	Canberra
16:30 AEDT		Report	Tilio 33'; Talbot 45+3'; Swibel 79'	Stadium: AIS Grass Fields; Attendance: 200; Referee: Nathan Shakespear

Round 7

22 December 2018	Newcastle Jets Youth	1–3	Central Coast Mariners Academy	Newcastle
16:30 AEDT	Tipaldo 75'	Report	Smylie 34', 90+1'; M'Mombwa 90+4'	Stadium: Adamstown Oval; Attendance: 238; Referee: Joel Ralston

22 December 2018	Western Sydney Wanderers Youth	4–0	Canberra United Youth	Sydney
16:30 AEDT	Agamemnonos 2'; Adam 41', 49'; Monge 86'	Report		Stadium: Valentine Sports Park; Referee: Hassan Jomaa

Round 8

3 January 2019	Newcastle Jets Youth	5–1	Western Sydney Wanderers Youth	Maitland
16:30 AEDT	Cowburn 6'; Austin 69', 89'; K. Petratos 81', 88'	Report	Peterson 52'	Stadium: Maitland No. 2 Sportsground; Attendance: 225; Referee: Joel Ralston

5 January 2019	Sydney FC Youth	0–3	Central Coast Mariners Academy	Sydney
		Report	Faust 65'; Ruiz-Diaz 81'; Katsoulis 90+1'	Stadium: Lambert Park; Attendance: 120; Referee: Nathan Shakespear

Round 9

12 January 2019	Central Coast Mariners Academy	2–1	Canberra United Youth	Tuggerah
10:30 AEDT	Ruiz-Diaz 55'; M'Mombwa 90+7'	Report	Carli 15'	Stadium: Central Coast Mariners Centre of Excellence; Attendance: 189; Referee: Hassan Jomaa

12 January 2019	Sydney FC Youth	3–2	Newcastle Jets Youth	Sydney
	Van der Saag 11', 89'; Lamberton 64'	Report	Simmons 21'; Champness 37'	Stadium: Lambert Park; Attendance: 100; Referee: Jarryd McFarlane

Round 10

26 January 2019	Canberra United Youth	1–1	Newcastle Jets Youth	Canberra
18:30 AEDT	Juach 84'	Report	Simmons 11'	Stadium: Deakin Stadium; Attendance: 300; Referee: Hassan Jomaa

27 January 2019	Western Sydney Wanderers Youth	2–1	Sydney FC Youth	Sydney
16:30 AEDT	Adam 45'; Roberts 82'	Report	Koop 19'	Stadium: Marconi Stadium; Attendance: 200

=== Grand Final ===
1 February 2019	Western Sydney Wanderers Youth	1–3	Brisbane Roar Youth	Sydney
16:20 AEST	Mourdoukoutas 79'	Report	Brady 22'; Leck 38'; Muratovic 61'	Stadium: ANZ Stadium; Attendance: 1,061; Referee: Shane Skinner

== Season statistics ==
=== Scoring ===
==== Top scorers ====
Rank	Player	Club	Goals
1	(Syria) Moudi Najjar	Melbourne City Youth	7
2	(Australia) Daniel Leck	Brisbane Roar Youth	6
3	(Australia) Mirza Muratovic	Brisbane Roar Youth	5
4	(Australia) Carlo Armiento	Adelaide United Youth	4
4	(Australia) Yazid Said	Melbourne Victory Youth	4
4	(Australia) Daniel Stynes	Perth Glory Youth	4
4	(Australia) Marco Tilio	Sydney FC Youth	4
8	(Sudan) Mohamed Adam	Western Sydney Wanderers Youth	3
8	(Australia) Shannon Brady	Brisbane Roar Youth	3
8	(Australia) Kosta Petratos	Newcastle Jets Youth	3
8	(Australia) Dylan Pierias	Melbourne City Youth	3
8	(Australia) Cai Tipaldo	Newcastle Jets Youth	3

==== Hat-tricks ====
Player	For	Against	Result	Date	Ref
(Australia) Daniel Leck	Brisbane Roar Youth	Melbourne Victory Youth	6–0	23 December 2018	

=== Clean sheets ===
Rank	Player	Club	Clean sheets
1	(Australia) Duro Dragicevic	Sydney FC Youth	4
1	(Australia) Nicholas Suman	Western Sydney Wanderers Youth	4
3	(Australia) Macklin Freke	Brisbane Roar Youth	2

=== Discipline ===
==== Player ====
- Most yellow cards: 3 – (Australia) Joshua Varga (Melbourne City Youth)
- Most red cards: 1 (seven players)

== See also ==
- 2018–19 A-League
- 2018–19 W-League
