= 2016–17 Brisbane Roar FC season =

Brisbane Roar
2016–17 season
- Chairman: Rahim Soekasah
- Manager: John Aloisi
- Stadium: Suncorp Stadium, Brisbane
- A-League: 3rd
- A-League Finals Series: Semi-finals
- FFA Cup: Round of 32
- AFC Champions League: Group stage
- Top goalscorer: League: Jamie Maclaren (19 goals); All: Jamie Maclaren (23 goals)
- Highest home attendance: 20,198 vs Melbourne City (4 November 2016)
- Lowest home attendance: 8,113 vs Central Coast Mariners (2 April 2017)
- Average home league attendance: 13,892
| Home colours | Away colours | Third colours |

The 2016–17 Brisbane Roar FC season was the club's twelfth season participating in the A-League, the FFA Cup for the third time, as well as the AFC Champions League for the fourth time. The soccer team is based in Brisbane, Queensland, Australia.

== Players ==
=== Squad information ===
Correct as of 30 September 2016 – players' numbers as per the official Brisbane Roar website

Note: Flags indicate national team as defined under FIFA eligibility rules; some limited exceptions apply. Players may hold more than one non-FIFA nationality.

| No. | Pos. | Nation | Player |
|---|---|---|---|
| 1 | GK | AUS | Michael Theo |
| 3 | DF | AUS | Luke DeVere |
| 4 | DF | AUS | Daniel Bowles |
| 5 | DF | AUS | Corey Brown |
| 6 | DF | GRE | Avraam Papadopoulos (Injury replacement) |
| 7 | MF | DEN | Thomas Kristensen |
| 8 | MF | AUS | Jacob Pepper |
| 9 | FW | AUS | Jamie Maclaren |
| 10 | MF | AUS | Brett Holman |
| 11 | MF | AUS | Tommy Oar |
| 13 | DF | AUS | Jade North (Vice-captain) |
| 15 | MF | ESP | Manuel Arana |

| No. | Pos. | Nation | Player |
|---|---|---|---|
| 16 | MF | AUS | Nathan Konstandopoulos |
| 17 | MF | AUS | Matt McKay (Captain) |
| 19 | DF | AUS | Jack Hingert |
| 20 | FW | AUS | Shannon Brady |
| 21 | GK | ENG | Jamie Young |
| 22 | MF | GER | Thomas Broich |
| 24 | DF | AUS | Connor O'Toole |
| 25 | DF | AUS | Kye Rowles |
| 26 | FW | AUS | Nicholas D'Agostino |
| 28 | FW | AUS | Brandon Borrello |
| 29 | MF | AUS | Joe Caletti |
| 33 | FW | AUS | Joey Katebian |

=== From youth squad ===
| N | Pos. | Nat. | Name | Age | Notes |
|---|---|---|---|---|---|
| 26 | FW | (Australia) | Nicholas D'Agostino | 18 | |
| 16 | MF | (Australia) | Nathan Konstandopoulos | 20 | |

=== Transfers in ===
| No. | Position | Player | Transferred from | Type/fee | Contract length | Date | Ref |
|---|---|---|---|---|---|---|---|
| 25 | DF | Kye Rowles | (Australia) Australian Institute of Sport | Free transfer | 2 years | 3 May 2016 | |
| 24 | DF | Connor O'Toole | Adelaide United | Undisclosed Fee | 2 years | 3 May 2016 | |
| 8 | MF | Jacob Pepper | Unattached | Free transfer | 1 year | 6 July 2016 | |
| 7 | MF | (Denmark) Thomas Kristensen | (Netherlands) ADO Den Haag | Free transfer | 1 year | 27 July 2016 | |
| 33 | FW | Joey Katebian | Unattached | Undisclosed Fee | 1.5 years | 5 August 2016 | |
| 10 | MF | Brett Holman | Unattached | Free transfer | 2 years | 1 September 2016 | |
| 15 | MF | (Spain) Manuel Arana | Unattached | Undisclosed Fee | 1 year | 30 September 2016 | |
| 6 | DF | (Greece) Avraam Papadopoulos | (Japan) Júbilo Iwata | Injury replacement loan | 1 year | 14 February 2017 | |

=== Transfers out ===
| No. | Position | Player | Transferred to | Type/fee | Date | Ref |
|---|---|---|---|---|---|---|
| 16 | MF | Devante Clut | Newcastle Jets | Free transfer | 28 April 2016 | |
| 11 | FW | (Costa Rica) Jean Carlos Solórzano | Unattached | Free transfer | 29 April 2016 | |
| 3 | DF | Shane Stefanutto | Retired | | 30 April 2016 | |
| 18 | MF | (Spain) Javier Hervás | (Bosnia and Herzegovina) Željezničar | Free transfer | 3 May 2016 | |
| 8 | MF | Steven Lustica | Unattached | Free transfer | 3 May 2016 | |
| 15 | DF | James Donachie | Unattached | Free transfer | 1 June 2016 | |
| 10 | FW | (Brazil) Henrique | (Malaysia) Negeri Sembilan | Free transfer | 16 June 2016 | |
| 7 | MF | (Spain) Corona | (Spain) Almería | Free transfer | 15 July 2016 | |
| 6 | DF | (Germany) Jérome Polenz | Retired | | 15 August 2016 | |
| 23 | FW | Dimitri Petratos | (South Korea) Ulsan Hyundai | $300,000 (Note: Following Petratos signing a pre-contract with Newcastle Jets for next season, the transfer fee was split.) | 6 February 2017 | |

=== Contract extensions ===
| Name | Position | Duration | Contract Expiry | Notes |
|---|---|---|---|---|
| (Australia) Jade North | Centre back | 1 year | 2017 | |
| (Australia) Matt McKay | Central midfielder | 1 year | 2018 | |
| (Denmark) Thomas Kristensen | Midfielder | 2 years | 2019 | |
| (Australia) Luke DeVere | Centre back | 2 years | 2019 | |
| (Australia) Jade North | Centre back | 1 year | 2018 | |

== Technical staff ==
| Position | Name |
|---|---|
| Manager | (Australia) John Aloisi |
| Assistant manager | (Australia) Ross Aloisi |
| Goalkeeping coach | (Australia) Jason Kearton |
| Youth coach | (Australia) Josh McCloughan |
| Strength & Conditioning Coach | (Australia) Karl Dodd |
| Physiotherapist | (Australia) Tony Ganter |

== Statistics ==
=== Squad statistics ===
| N | Pos. | Nat. | Name | Total | | | | | A-League | | | | | FFA Cup | | | | | AFC Champions League |
| N | Pos. | Nat. | Name | Apps | Goals | Yellow card | Second yellow card | Red card | Apps | Goals | Yellow card | Second yellow card | Red card | Apps | Goals | Yellow card | Second yellow card | Red card | Apps | Goals | Yellow card | Second yellow card | Red card |
|---|---|---|---|---|---|---|---|---|---|---|---|---|---|---|---|---|---|---|---|---|---|---|---|
| 1 | GK | (Australia) | Michael Theo | 26 | 0 | 4 | 0 | 1 | 24 | 0 | 3 | 0 | 1 | 1 | 0 | 0 | 0 | 0 | 1 | 0 | 1 | 0 | 0 |
| 3 | DF | (Australia) | Luke DeVere | 29 | 1 | 3 | 0 | 0 | 25 | 1 | 3 | 0 | 0 | 0 | 0 | 0 | 0 | 0 | 4 | 0 | 0 | 0 | 0 |
| 4 | DF | (Australia) | Daniel Bowles | 9 | 0 | 2 | 0 | 0 | 2+4 | 0 | 1 | 0 | 0 | 1 | 0 | 1 | 0 | 0 | 1+1 | 0 | 0 | 0 | 0 |
| 5 | DF | (Australia) | Corey Brown | 30 | 1 | 10 | 0 | 0 | 25 | 1 | 7 | 0 | 0 | 1 | 0 | 1 | 0 | 0 | 4 | 0 | 2 | 0 | 0 |
| 6 | DF | (Greece) | Avraam Papadopoulos | 10 | 0 | 5 | 0 | 0 | 7 | 0 | 2 | 0 | 0 | 0 | 0 | 0 | 0 | 0 | 3 | 0 | 3 | 0 | 0 |
| 7 | MF | (Denmark) | Thomas Kristensen | 29 | 4 | 6 | 0 | 0 | 24+1 | 4 | 6 | 0 | 0 | 0 | 0 | 0 | 0 | 0 | 4 | 0 | 0 | 0 | 0 |
| 8 | MF | (Australia) | Jacob Pepper | 17 | 0 | 7 | 0 | 0 | 5+7 | 0 | 5 | 0 | 0 | 1 | 0 | 0 | 0 | 0 | 3+1 | 0 | 2 | 0 | 0 |
| 9 | FW | (Australia) | Jamie Maclaren | 35 | 23 | 1 | 0 | 0 | 25+3 | 20 | 1 | 0 | 0 | 1 | 0 | 0 | 0 | 0 | 5+1 | 3 | 0 | 0 | 0 |
| 10 | MF | (Australia) | Brett Holman | 26 | 6 | 3 | 0 | 0 | 18+3 | 5 | 3 | 0 | 0 | 0 | 0 | 0 | 0 | 0 | 5 | 1 | 0 | 0 | 0 |
| 11 | MF | (Australia) | Tommy Oar | 30 | 2 | 0 | 0 | 0 | 19+5 | 1 | 0 | 0 | 0 | 1 | 0 | 0 | 0 | 0 | 4+1 | 1 | 0 | 0 | 0 |
| 13 | DF | (Australia) | Jade North | 32 | 0 | 5 | 0 | 0 | 25+1 | 0 | 5 | 0 | 0 | 1 | 0 | 0 | 0 | 0 | 5 | 0 | 0 | 0 | 0 |
| 15 | MF | (Spain) | Manuel Arana | 24 | 2 | 3 | 0 | 0 | 7+11 | 0 | 2 | 0 | 0 | 0 | 0 | 0 | 0 | 0 | 4+2 | 2 | 1 | 0 | 0 |
| 16 | MF | (Australia) | Nathan Konstandopoulos | 4 | 0 | 0 | 0 | 0 | 0+2 | 0 | 0 | 0 | 0 | 0+1 | 0 | 0 | 0 | 0 | 1 | 0 | 0 | 0 | 0 |
| 17 | MF | (Australia) | Matt McKay | 29 | 0 | 2 | 1 | 0 | 23 | 0 | 0 | 1 | 0 | 1 | 0 | 1 | 0 | 0 | 5 | 0 | 1 | 0 | 0 |
| 19 | DF | (Australia) | Jack Hingert | 32 | 0 | 4 | 0 | 0 | 25 | 0 | 4 | 0 | 0 | 1 | 0 | 0 | 0 | 0 | 6 | 0 | 0 | 0 | 0 |
| 20 | FW | (Australia) | Shannon Brady | 7 | 0 | 0 | 0 | 0 | 0+3 | 0 | 0 | 0 | 0 | 0 | 0 | 0 | 0 | 0 | 1+3 | 0 | 0 | 0 | 0 |
| 21 | GK | (England) | Jamie Young | 13 | 0 | 0 | 0 | 0 | 5+1 | 0 | 0 | 0 | 0 | 0 | 0 | 0 | 0 | 0 | 7 | 0 | 0 | 0 | 0 |
| 22 | MF | (Germany) | Thomas Broich | 31 | 2 | 1 | 0 | 0 | 19+6 | 2 | 1 | 0 | 0 | 0+1 | 0 | 0 | 0 | 0 | 4+1 | 0 | 0 | 0 | 0 |
| 24 | DF | (Australia) | Connor O'Toole | 2 | 0 | 0 | 0 | 0 | 0 | 0 | 0 | 0 | 0 | 0 | 0 | 0 | 0 | 0 | 0+2 | 0 | 0 | 0 | 0 |
| 25 | DF | (Australia) | Kye Rowles | 4 | 0 | 0 | 0 | 0 | 0+2 | 0 | 0 | 0 | 0 | 0 | 0 | 0 | 0 | 0 | 2 | 0 | 0 | 0 | 0 |
| 26 | FW | (Australia) | Nicholas D'Agostino | 14 | 2 | 0 | 0 | 0 | 0+8 | 2 | 0 | 0 | 0 | 0 | 0 | 0 | 0 | 0 | 2+4 | 0 | 0 | 0 | 0 |
| 28 | FW | (Australia) | Brandon Borrello | 33 | 9 | 8 | 0 | 0 | 17+8 | 4 | 7 | 0 | 0 | 1 | 0 | 0 | 0 | 0 | 7 | 5 | 1 | 0 | 0 |
| 29 | MF | (Australia) | Joe Caletti | 15 | 0 | 1 | 0 | 0 | 8+2 | 0 | 1 | 0 | 0 | 0 | 0 | 0 | 0 | 0 | 2+3 | 0 | 0 | 0 | 0 |
| 33 | FW | (Australia) | Joey Katebian | 6 | 0 | 0 | 0 | 0 | 0+4 | 0 | 0 | 0 | 0 | 0 | 0 | 0 | 0 | 0 | 2 | 0 | 0 | 0 | 0 |
| 43 | GK | (Australia) | Tomislav Bilic | 1 | 0 | 0 | 0 | 0 | 0 | 0 | 0 | 0 | 0 | 0 | 0 | 0 | 0 | 0 | 0+1 | 0 | 0 | 0 | 0 |
| 46 | DF | (Australia) | Cameron Crestani | 6 | 0 | 3 | 0 | 0 | 2+1 | 0 | 2 | 0 | 0 | 0 | 0 | 0 | 0 | 0 | 3 | 0 | 1 | 0 | 0 |
| 50 | FW | (New Zealand) | Dane Ingham | 7 | 1 | 1 | 0 | 0 | 2+1 | 1 | 0 | 0 | 0 | 0 | 0 | 0 | 0 | 0 | 3+1 | 0 | 1 | 0 | 0 |
Players no longer at the club:
| 23 | FW | (Australia) | Dimitri Petratos | 15 | 2 | 1 | 0 | 0 | 12+2 | 2 | 1 | 0 | 0 | 1 | 0 | 0 | 0 | 0 | 0 | 0 | 0 | 0 | 0 |

- Last updated: 10 May 2017
- Source: au.soccerway.com
- (yellow card) = Number of bookings; (second yellow card) = Number of sending offs after a second yellow card; (red card) = Number of sending offs by a direct red card.

== Pre-season and friendlies ==
| 29 July 2016 | Brisbane Roar (Australia) | 1–2 | (Australia) Western Sydney Wanderers | Gold Coast, Australia |
| 15:00 AEST | Broich 54' | Report | Shabow 17'; Sotirio 26' | Stadium: Cbus Super Stadium; Attendance: 0 (behind closed doors); Referee: Alex King |

| 20 August 2016 | Brisbane Roar (Australia) | 1–2 | (Australia) Sydney FC | Gold Coast, Australia |
| 15:00 AEST | Maclaren 45' | Report | Simon 12'; Zullo 89' | Stadium: Cbus Super Stadium; Attendance: 0 (behind closed doors); Referee: Peter Green |

| 27 August 2016 | Brisbane Roar (Australia) | 4–0 | (Australia) BPL Select | Brisbane, Australia |
| 19:30 AEST | D. Petratos 33'; Maclaren 39'; Bowles 86'; Leck 88' | Report | | Stadium: QSAC |

| 10 September 2016 | Brisbane Roar (Australia) | Cancelled | (Australia) Central Coast Mariners | Brisbane, Australia |
| 15:00 AEST | | Cancellation | | Stadium: Corporate Travel Management Stadium |

| 20 September 2016 | Perth Glory (Australia) | 0–4 | (Australia) Brisbane Roar | Sydney, Australia |
| 15:00 AEST | | Report | Risdon 35' (o.g.); Maclaren 38'; D. Petratos 65'; Broich 71' | Stadium: Leichhardt Oval; Attendance: 0 (behind closed doors) |

| 24 September 2016 | Brisbane Roar (Australia) | 3–1 | (Australia) NPL Queensland U-23 Select | Brisbane, Australia |
| 15:00 AEST | Broich 24'; Maclaren 35', 83' | Report | Duckworth 58' | Stadium: QSAC; Referee: Casey Reibelt |

== Competitions ==
=== Overview ===
| Competition | First match | Last match | Starting round | Final position | Record | | | | | | | |
| Competition | First match | Last match | Starting round | Final position | Pld | W | D | L | GF | GA | GD | Win % |
|---|---|---|---|---|---|---|---|---|---|---|---|---|
| A-League | 7 October 2016 | 16 April 2017 | Matchday 1 | 3rd | 27 | 11 | 9 | 7 | 43 | 37 | +6 | 40.74 |
| A-League Finals | 16 April 2017 | 21 April 2017 | Elimination-finals | Semi-finals | 2 | 0 | 1 | 1 | 1 | 2 | −1 | 0.00 |
| FFA Cup | 10 August 2016 | | Round of 32 | Round of 32 | 1 | 0 | 0 | 1 | 0 | 2 | −2 | 0.00 |
| AFC Champions League | 21 February 2017 | 10 May 2017 | Preliminary round 2 | Group stage (4th) | 8 | 3 | 1 | 4 | 12 | 16 | −4 | 37.50 |
| Total | | | | | 38 | 14 | 11 | 13 | 56 | 57 | −1 | 36.84 |

Source: Competitions

=== A-League ===
==== League table ====
| Pos | Team | Pld | W | D | L | GF | GA | GD | Pts | Qualification |
|---|---|---|---|---|---|---|---|---|---|---|
| 1 | Sydney FC (C) | 27 | 20 | 6 | 1 | 55 | 12 | +43 | 66 | Qualification for 2018 AFC Champions League group stage and Finals series |
| 2 | Melbourne Victory | 27 | 15 | 4 | 8 | 49 | 31 | +18 | 49 | Qualification for 2018 AFC Champions League group stage and Finals series |
| 3 | Brisbane Roar | 27 | 11 | 9 | 7 | 43 | 37 | +6 | 42 | Qualification for 2018 AFC Champions League second preliminary round and Finals series |
| 4 | Melbourne City | 27 | 11 | 6 | 10 | 49 | 44 | +5 | 39 | Qualification for Finals series |
| 5 | Perth Glory | 27 | 10 | 9 | 8 | 53 | 53 | 0 | 39 | Qualification for Finals series |
| 6 | Western Sydney Wanderers | 27 | 8 | 12 | 7 | 35 | 35 | 0 | 36 | Qualification for Finals series |
| 7 | Wellington Phoenix (Note: Wellington Phoenix cannot qualify for the AFC Champions League as they are not recognised as an AFC club.) | 27 | 8 | 6 | 13 | 41 | 46 | −5 | 30 | |
| 8 | Central Coast Mariners | 27 | 6 | 5 | 16 | 31 | 52 | −21 | 23 | |
| 9 | Adelaide United | 27 | 5 | 8 | 14 | 25 | 46 | −21 | 23 | |
| 10 | Newcastle Jets | 27 | 5 | 7 | 15 | 28 | 53 | −25 | 22 | |

Source: A-Leagues
Rules for classification: 1) points; 2) goal difference; 3) number of goals scored.
(C) Champions

==== Results summary ====
| Overall | | | | | | | | Home | | | | | | Away | | | | | |
| Pld | W | D | L | GF | GA | GD | Pts | W | D | L | GF | GA | GD | W | D | L | GF | GA | GD |
|---|---|---|---|---|---|---|---|---|---|---|---|---|---|---|---|---|---|---|---|
| 27 | 11 | 9 | 7 | 43 | 37 | +6 | 42 | 7 | 4 | 2 | 25 | 14 | +11 | 4 | 5 | 5 | 18 | 23 | −5 |

Last updated: 16 April 2017.
Source: ultimatealeague.com

==== Results by round ====
| Round | 1 | 2 | 3 | 4 | 5 | 6 | 7 | 8 | 9 | 10 | 11 | 12 | 13 | 14 | 15 | 16 | 17 | 18 | 19 | 20 | 21 | 22 | 23 | 24 | 25 | 26 | 27 |
|---|---|---|---|---|---|---|---|---|---|---|---|---|---|---|---|---|---|---|---|---|---|---|---|---|---|---|---|
| Ground | H | A | A | H | H | A | H | A | A | H | A | H | A | H | A | A | H | H | A | A | H | A | A | H | H | A | H |
| Result | D | L | W | W | W | D | D | D | D | W | W | D | L | L | L | W | W | D | D | D | L | W | L | W | W | L | W |
| Position | 5 | 9 | 7 | 5 | 2 | 3 | 3 | 4 | 4 | 4 | 3 | 3 | 3 | 4 | 4 | 4 | 3 | 3 | 3 | 4 | 5 | 4 | 4 | 4 | 3 | 4 | 3 |

Updated to match(es) played on 16 April 2017. Source: ultimatealeague.com
A = Away; H = Home; W = Win; D = Draw; L = Loss

==== Matches ====
| 7 October 2016 1 | Brisbane Roar | 1–1 | Melbourne Victory | Brisbane |
| 18:50 AEST | DeVere 90+6' | Report | Austin 83' | Stadium: Suncorp Stadium; Attendance: 15,805; Referee: Shaun Evans |

| 16 October 2016 2 | Newcastle Jets | 4–0 | Brisbane Roar | Newcastle |
| 17:00 AEDT | Hingert 8' (o.g.); Boogaard 62'; Ugarković 71'; Clut 86' | Report | | Stadium: McDonald Jones Stadium; Attendance: 8,335; Referee: Peter Green |

| 22 October 2016 3 | Central Coast Mariners | 0–1 | Brisbane Roar | Gosford |
| 17:35 AEDT | | Report | Kristensen 33' | Stadium: Central Coast Stadium; Attendance: 7,073; Referee: Adam Fielding |

| 30 October 2016 4 | Brisbane Roar | 2–1 | Perth Glory | Brisbane |
| 16:00 AEST | Maclaren 31'; Borrello 75' | Report | Marinković 54' | Stadium: Suncorp Stadium; Attendance: 13,428; Referee: Jonathan Barreiro |

| 4 November 2016 5 | Brisbane Roar | 1–0 | Melbourne City | Brisbane |
| 18:50 AEST | Maclaren 11' | Report | | Stadium: Suncorp Stadium; Attendance: 20,198; Referee: Peter Green |

| 11 November 2016 6 | Adelaide United | 1–1 | Brisbane Roar | Adelaide |
| 19:20 ACDT | Guardiola 78' | Report | Holman 60' | Stadium: Coopers Stadium; Attendance: 9,146; Referee: Chris Beath |

| 19 November 2016 7 | Brisbane Roar | 1–1 | Sydney FC | Brisbane |
| 18:50 AEST | Kristensen 40' | Report | Brillante 13' | Stadium: Suncorp Stadium; Attendance: 17,322; Referee: Alan Milliner |

| 25 November 2016 8 | Western Sydney Wanderers | 1–1 | Brisbane Roar | Sydney |
| 19:50 AEDT | Kusukami 56' | Report | Maclaren 18' (pen.) | Stadium: Spotless Stadium; Attendance: 11,201; Referee: Adam Fielding |

| 3 December 2016 9 | Melbourne City | 1–1 | Brisbane Roar | Melbourne |
| 19:50 AEDT | Colazo 54' | Report | Maclaren 38' | Stadium: AAMI Park; Attendance: 8,394; Referee: Shaun Evans |

| 11 December 2016 10 | Brisbane Roar | 4–0 | Adelaide United | Brisbane |
| 16:00 AEST | Kristensen 28', 30'; Broich 55'; Maclaren 85' (pen.) | Report | | Stadium: Suncorp Stadium; Attendance: 15,605; Referee: Peter Green |

| 18 December 2016 11 | Central Coast Mariners | 1–2 | Brisbane Roar | Gosford |
| 17:00 AEDT | O'Donovan 57' | Report | D. Petratos 33'; Maclaren 76' | Stadium: Central Coast Stadium; Attendance: 6,063; Referee: Chris Beath |

| 23 December 2016 12 | Brisbane Roar | 1–1 | Western Sydney Wanderers | Brisbane |
| 18:50 AEST | C. Brown 52' | Report | Dimas 69' | Stadium: Suncorp Stadium; Attendance: 13,110; Referee: Kris Griffiths-Jones |

| 30 December 2016 13 | Sydney FC | 2–0 | Brisbane Roar | Sydney |
| 19:50 AEDT | Brosque 36'; Ninković 63' | Report | | Stadium: Allianz Stadium; Attendance: 16,510; Referee: Shaun Evans |

| 7 January 2017 14 | Brisbane Roar | 2–3 | Newcastle Jets | Brisbane |
| 16:35 AEST | Oar 15'; Maclaren 82' (pen.) | Report | Hoole 45+1'; Nabbout 72'; Nordstrand 84' | Stadium: Suncorp Stadium; Attendance: 14,470; Referee: Kurt Ams |

| 13 January 2017 15 | Melbourne Victory | 3–2 | Brisbane Roar | Melbourne |
| 19:50 AEDT | Troisi 12'; Rojas 17'; Berisha 27' (pen.) | Report | Petratos 30'; Donachie 41' (o.g.) | Stadium: AAMI Park; Attendance: 21,103; Referee: Chris Beath |

| 21 January 2017 16 | Wellington Phoenix | 0–1 | Brisbane Roar | Wellington |
| 19:35 NZDT | | Report | Maclaren 87' | Stadium: Westpac Stadium; Attendance: 6,449; Referee: Jonathan Barreiro |

| 28 January 2017 17 | Brisbane Roar | 2–1 | Western Sydney Wanderers | Brisbane |
| 18:50 AEST | Borrello 22'; Holman 90+3' | Report | Kusukami 32' | Stadium: Suncorp Stadium; Attendance: 13,058; Referee: Chris Beath |

| 3 February 2017 18 | Brisbane Roar | 0–0 | Sydney FC | Brisbane |
| 18:50 AEST | | Report | | Stadium: Suncorp Stadium; Attendance: 13,095; Referee: Peter Green |

| 11 February 2017 19 | Melbourne City | 2–2 | Brisbane Roar | Melbourne |
| 19:50 AEDT | Kamau 59'; Colazo 61' (pen.) | Report | Maclaren 34' (pen.), 45+1' | Stadium: AAMI Park; Attendance: 8,414; Referee: Alan Milliner |

| 18 February 2017 20 | Perth Glory | 2–2 | Brisbane Roar | Perth |
| 19:00 AWST | Marinković 38'; Taggart 48' | Report | Maclaren 31'; D. Ingham 40' | Stadium: nib Stadium; Attendance: 10,762; Referee: Jarred Gillett |

| 25 February 2017 21 | Brisbane Roar | 1–2 | Wellington Phoenix | Brisbane |
| 16:35 AEST | Borrello 75' | Report | Smeltz 32'; Krishna 61' | Stadium: Suncorp Stadium; Attendance: 10,723; Referee: Kris Griffiths-Jones |

| 5 March 2017 22 | Newcastle Jets | 1–3 | Brisbane Roar | Newcastle |
| 19:00 AEDT | Nabbout 10' (pen.) | Report | Maclaren 62' (pen.), 74'; D'Agostino 90' | Stadium: McDonald Jones Stadium; Attendance: 7,122; Referee: Jarred Gillett |

| 19 March 2017 23 | Adelaide United | 2–1 | Brisbane Roar | Adelaide |
| 16:30 ACDT | Diawara 16'; Cirio 90+8' (pen.) | Report | Maclaren 60' | Stadium: Coopers Stadium; Attendance: 7,197; Referee: Stephen Lucas |

| 25 March 2017 24 | Brisbane Roar | 1–0 | Melbourne Victory | Brisbane |
| 18:50 AEST | Maclaren 51' | Report | | Stadium: Suncorp Stadium; Attendance: 13,576; Referee: Matthew Conger |

| 2 April 2017 25 | Brisbane Roar | 5–1 | Central Coast Mariners | Brisbane |
| 19:00 AEST | Maclaren 62', 66', 70'; Broich 82'; D'Agostino 90+1' | Report | Ferreira 49' | Stadium: Suncorp Stadium; Attendance: 8,113; Referee: Daniel Elder |

| 8 April 2017 26 | Perth Glory | 3–1 | Brisbane Roar | Perth |
| 19:00 AWST | Garcia 35'; Keogh 67'; Ro. Griffiths 76' | Report | Holman 57' | Stadium: nib Stadium; Attendance: 8,834; Referee: Chris Beath |

| 16 April 2017 27 | Brisbane Roar | 4–3 | Wellington Phoenix | Brisbane |
| 17:00 AEST | Holman 21', 67'; Borrello 51'; Maclaren 53' | Report | Krishna 6'; Finkler 38'; McGlinchey 41' | Stadium: Suncorp Stadium; Attendance: 12,098; Referee: Kris Griffiths-Jones |

==== Finals series ====
| 21 April 2017 Elimination-final | Brisbane Roar | 1–1 (a.e.t.) (6–5 p) | Western Sydney Wanderers | Brisbane |
| 19:50 AEST | Maclaren 55' | Report | Antonis 45+2' (pen.) | Stadium: Suncorp Stadium; Attendance: 17,530; Referee: Jarred Gillett |
| | Penalties |
| | Borrello (penalty scored); D'Agostino (penalty scored); Maclaren (penalty scored); DeVere (penalty scored); Kristensen (penalty scored); Oar (penalty scored) | | (penalty scored) Antonis; (penalty scored) Dimas; (penalty scored) N. Martínez; (penalty scored) Hamill; (penalty scored) Cornthwaite; (penalty missed) Kusukami |

| 30 April 2017 Semi-final | Melbourne Victory | 1–0 | Brisbane Roar | Melbourne |
| 17:00 AEST | Berisha 70' | Report | | Stadium: AAMI Park; Attendance: 20,202; Referee: Kris Griffiths-Jones |

=== FFA Cup ===
| 10 August 2016 Round of 32 | Brisbane Roar (Queensland) | 0–2 | (Western Australia) Perth Glory | Brisbane |
| 19:30 AEST | | Report | Djulbic 12', 19' | Stadium: Ballymore Stadium; Attendance: 3,028; Referee: Chris Beath |

=== AFC Champions League ===
==== Qualifying play-offs ====
| 31 January 2017 Preliminary round 2 | Brisbane Roar (Australia) | 6–0 | (Philippines) Global | Brisbane, Australia |
| 19:00 AEST | Borrello 11', 25', 29', 80'; Arana 37', 65' | Report | | Stadium: Brisbane Stadium; Attendance: 3,657; Referee: Khamis Al-Marri (Qatar) |

| 8 February 2017 Play-off round | Shanghai Shenhua (China) | 0–2 | (Australia) Brisbane Roar | Shanghai, China |
| 19:45 CST | | Report | Borrello 2'; Oar 41' | Stadium: Hongkou Football Stadium; Attendance: 23,980; Referee: Valentin Kovalenko (Uzbekistan) |

==== Group stage ====
| Pos | Team | Pld | W | D | L | GF | GA | GD | Pts | Qualification |
|---|---|---|---|---|---|---|---|---|---|---|
| 1 | (Japan) Kashima Antlers | 6 | 4 | 0 | 2 | 13 | 5 | +8 | 12 | Advance to knockout stage |
| 2 | (Thailand) Muangthong United | 6 | 3 | 2 | 1 | 7 | 3 | +4 | 11 | Advance to knockout stage |
| 3 | (South Korea) Ulsan Hyundai | 6 | 2 | 1 | 3 | 9 | 9 | 0 | 7 | |
| 4 | (Australia) Brisbane Roar | 6 | 1 | 1 | 4 | 4 | 16 | −12 | 4 | |

Source: AFC
Rules for classification: Group stage tiebreakers

| 21 February 2017 1 | Brisbane Roar (Australia) | 0–0 | (Thailand) Muangthong United | Brisbane, Australia |
| 19:00 AEST | | Report | | Stadium: Brisbane Stadium; Attendance: 4,536; Referee: Fahad Al-Marri (Qatar) |

| 28 February 2017 2 | Ulsan Hyundai (South Korea) | 6–0 | (Australia) Brisbane Roar | Ulsan, South Korea |
| 19:30 KST | I.S. Kim 10', 68'; Oršić 13', 34'; Kovačec 55'; J.H. Lee 90+3' | Report | | Stadium: Ulsan Munsu Football Stadium; Attendance: 1,303; Referee: Turki Al-Khudhayr (Saudi Arabia) |

| 14 March 2017 3 | Kashima Antlers (Japan) | 3–0 | (Australia) Brisbane Roar | Kashima, Japan |
| 19:00 JST | Suzuki 43'; Ueda 76'; Endo 79' | Report | | Stadium: Kashima Soccer Stadium; Attendance: 6,558; Referee: Alireza Faghani (Iran) |

| 12 April 2017 4 | Brisbane Roar (Australia) | 2–1 | (Japan) Kashima Antlers | Brisbane, Australia |
| 20:00 AEST | Maclaren 18'; Holman 49' | Report | Nagaki 79' | Stadium: Brisbane Stadium; Attendance: 5,567; Referee: Wang Di (China) |

| 26 April 2017 5 | Muangthong United (Thailand) | 3–0 | (Australia) Brisbane Roar | Pak Kret, Thailand |
| 19:30 ICT | Xisco 37'; Chanathip 83'; Teerasil 89' | Report | | Stadium: SCG Stadium; Attendance: 11,807; Referee: Fahad Al-Mirdasi (Saudi Arabia) |

| 10 May 2017 6 | Brisbane Roar (Australia) | 2–3 | (South Korea) Ulsan Hyundai | Brisbane, Australia |
| 20:00 AEST | Maclaren 18', 37' | Report | Seo 9'; Nam 54'; Y.J. Kim 76' | Stadium: Brisbane Stadium; Attendance: 3,245; Referee: Mohanad Qasim Eesee Sarray (Iraq) |
