= Mirza Muratovic =

Australian soccer player

Personal information
- Full name: Mirza Muratovic
- Date of birth: 14 January 2000 (age 26)
- Place of birth: Oberon, New South Wales, Australia
- Position: Forward

Team information
- Current team: Wollongong Wolves
- Number: 10

Senior career*
Years	Team	Apps	(Gls)
2016–2017	FFA CoE	30	(20)
2018–2019	Brisbane Roar NPL	40	(21)
2019–2020	Brisbane Roar	13	(2)
2020–2021	Wellington Phoenix	8	(2)
2021–2022	Gold Coast Knights	24	(6)
2022–	Wollongong Wolves	11	(2)

International career^{‡}
2015–2016	Australia U17	11	(8)
- * Club domestic league appearances and goals as of 28 August 2022 ‡ National team caps and goals as of 6 October 2023

Mirza Muratovic (Bosnian: Mirza Muratović; born 14 January 2000) is an Australian professional soccer player who plays as a forward for Wollongong Wolves in the National Premier Leagues.

== Club career ==
=== Brisbane Roar ===
Muratovic was part of the 2018–19 Y-League championship winning Brisbane Roar Youth team. He played 90 minutes and scored the third goal as the Young Roar beat Western Sydney Wanderers Youth 3–1 in the 2019 Y-League Grand Final on 1 February 2019.

Muratovic made his professional debut for the Roar on 28 December 2019, playing the full game in a 1–1 draw against the Newcastle Jets at McDonald Jones Stadium. He made a second consecutive start 4 days later, providing an assist for Bradden Inman's winner in a 2–1 victory over Western Sydney Wanderers. For his performance, he was named in the Round 13 Hyundai A-League Team of the Week. Muratovic scored his first professional goal in a Round 18 clash against Adelaide United on 8 February 2020, scoring the equaliser in an eventual 2–1 win. He scored his second goal of the season the following week, tapping home the winner in a 1–0 victory over Western United.

=== Wellington Phoenix ===
On the 10 November, it was announced that Muratovic had signed a one-year deal with Wellington Phoenix for the upcoming 2020–21 season.

=== Wollongong Wolves ===
On the 31st of October 2022, Wollongong Wolves announced that they had signed Muratovic for the upcoming NPL 2023 Season.

== Honours ==
=== Club ===
Brisbane Roar

- Y-League: 2018–19

=== International ===
Australia U17

- AFF U-16 Youth Championship: 2016
