= Daniel Leck =

Australian soccer player (born 1999)

Personal information
- Full name: Daniel Leck
- Date of birth: 16 February 1999 (age 27)
- Place of birth: Brisbane, Australia
- Height: 1.78 m (5 ft 10 in)
- Position: Winger

Team information
- Current team: Olympic FC

Youth career
- 2013–2015: Palm Beach Sharks
- 2015–2019: Brisbane Roar

Senior career*
Years	Team	Apps	(Gls)
2015–2019	Brisbane Roar NPL	40	(12)
2017–2019	Brisbane Roar	14	(0)
2019	Pascoe Vale	11	(0)
2020–	Olympic FC	95	(49)
- * Club domestic league appearances and goals as of 21 September 2023

Daniel Leck (born 16 February 1999), is an Australian professional footballer who plays as a winger for Olympic FC in the National Premier Leagues Queensland.

== Club career ==
=== Brisbane Roar ===
Leck made his first appearance as a second-half substitute in the Roar's 2–1 loss to Melbourne Victory in Round 11 of the 2017–18 season.

Leck was part of the 2018-19 Y-League championship winning Brisbane Roar U21 team. He scored the 2nd goal as Roar beat Western Sydney Wanderers U21 3–1 in the 2019 Y-League Grand Final on 1 February 2019.

=== Pascoe Vale ===
In June 2019, Leck signed for Pascoe Vale.

== Honours ==
Brisbane Roar

- Y-League: 2018–19
