= Shannon Brady =

Australian footballer

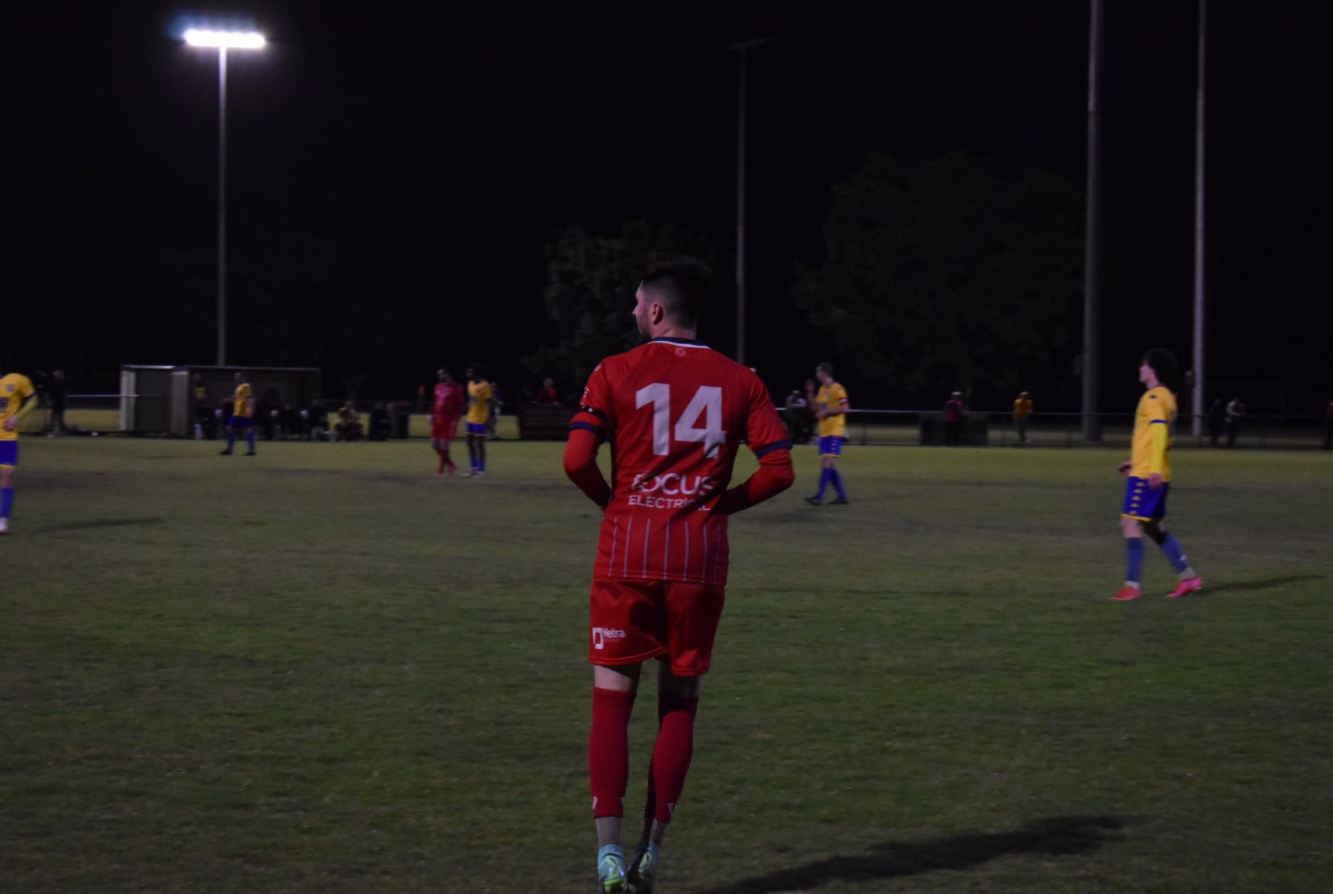
- Brady in a match against Capalaba FC, 3 September 2021

Personal information
- Full name: Shannon Jon Brady
- Date of birth: 21 June 1996 (age 30)
- Place of birth: Gold Coast, Australia
- Height: 1.74 m (5 ft 8 1/2 in)
- Position: Winger

Youth career
- Gold Coast Knights
- Brisbane Roar

Senior career*
Years	Team	Apps	(Gls)
2013	QAS	21	(0)
2014–2019	Brisbane Roar NPL	20	(5)
2014–2019	Brisbane Roar	15	(0)
2019	Gold Coast Knights	17	(7)
2020	Brisbane City	24	(4)
2021–2022	Olympic FC	50	(27)

International career^{‡}
2014–2015	Australia U20	7	(2)
- * Club domestic league appearances and goals as of 21 September 2022 ‡ National team caps and goals as of 25 March 2020

Shannon Jon Brady (born 21 June 1996) is an Australian footballer who plays as a winger.

== Club career ==
=== Brisbane Roar ===
Brady made his first appearance as a second-half substitute in the Roar's 4–0 win over Newcastle Jets in Round 6 of the 2014–15 season. On 30 March 2015 after 4 appearances in the A-League, Brady signed a 4-year deal with Brisbane Roar.

Brady scored the opening goal in the Young Roar's 3–1 win over Western Sydney Wanderers Youth in the 2019 Y-League Grand Final, the first time the Roar have won the competition. For his performance, he was named as man of the match.

On 11 March 2019, after 5 years at the club, Brady left the Brisbane Roar after terminating his contract by mutual consent.

=== Gold Coast Knights ===
On 13 March 2019, Brady signed a two-month contract with Gold Coast Knights as an injury replacement for defender Eoghan Murphy. Brady made his first appearance on 16 March 2019 against Gold Coast United in the first edition of the Gold Coast Derby, replacing Nicholas Panetta in the 84th minute as the two sides played out a 1–1 draw. He scored his first goals for the Knights in a 6–1 victory over Brisbane Strikers on 22 March 2019, bagging a second-half brace and assisting Jarrod Kyle's goal. He followed this up 5 days later by scoring on his maiden league start, his cross finding the back of the net in a 3–0 win over his former side Brisbane Roar Youth. On 20 July 2019, Brady scored the winner in a 2–1 win over SWQ Thunder to make it 3 goals from 3 starts in his Knights career. For his performance, he was named in the Team of the Week. He was an unused sub as the Knights defeated Olympic FC 2–1 in the 2019 NPL Queensland Grand Final, claiming their first piece of top-flight silverware in their inaugural campaign.

=== Brisbane City ===
On 23 January 2020, Brady joined Brisbane City on a one-year contract for the 2020 NPL Queensland season. He made his debut in City's 2–1 win over Brisbane Strikers in Round 3, playing the full game and providing the assist for Jean Carlos Solórzano's winner. A week later, he again assisted Solorzano’s goal, the opener in a 1–1 draw with Magpies Crusaders at Sologinkin Oval. Brady scored his first goal for City in a 2-0 win over Brisbane Roar Youth on 16 August 2020. He scored in consecutive weeks when he found the back of the net against Capalaba FC, bagging his side's second as they secured a 3-2 victory. Brady took his season assist tally to eight when he assisted both goals in a Round 10 clash with the then table-topping Gold Coast Knights, playing out a 2-2 draw in Carrara. On 12 September 2020, he assisted Alex Simmons' equalizer before scoring an 84th minute consolation goal as City were beaten 3-2 by Redlands United at CTM Stadium. Brady started in their relegation decider against Olympic on 15 November 2020, scoring his side's first before assisting Matt Smith's late equalizer as they secured a 3-3 draw. However, the result meant that City fell short of Capalaba on the basis of games won and were relegated from the NPL Queensland. Brady finished the season with four goals and ten assists, responsible for over a third of his side's 37 goals.

=== Olympic FC ===
Brady departed Brisbane City after their relegation, signing on with Olympic FC for the 2021 NPL Queensland season. He made his debut in a 1-0 win over Gold Coast United on the opening day of the season, starting before being substituted in the second-half.

== International career ==
On 30 September 2014, Brady was selected in the Young Socceroos squad for the 2014 AFC U-19 Championship. He made his only appearance in the Young Socceroos' Group B clash with Indonesia, playing 63 minutes before being replaced by Awer Mabil in the 1–0 win. He scored in a friendly clash against Mexico on 24 May 2015, grabbing Australia's second as they were held to a 2–2 at Jubilee Oval.

== Career statistics ==
As of 9 May 2024

Club	Season	League			Cup		Continental		Total	
Club	Season	Division	Apps	Goals	Apps	Goals	Apps	Goals	Apps	Goals
Brisbane Roar	2014–15	A-League	6	0	0	0	0	0	6	0
Brisbane Roar	2015–16	A-League	2	0	0	0	0	0	2	0
Brisbane Roar	2016–17	A-League	3	0	0	0	4	0	7	0
Brisbane Roar	2017–18	A-League	3	0	1	0	1	0	5	0
Brisbane Roar	2018–19	A-League	1	0	0	0	0	0	1	0
Brisbane Roar	Brisbane total		15	0	1	0	5	0	21	0
Gold Coast Knights	2019	NPL Queensland	17	7	2	0	0	0	19	7
Gold Coast Knights	Gold Coast total		17	7	2	0	0	0	19	7
Brisbane City	2020	NPL Queensland	24	4	0	0	0	0	24	4
Brisbane City	City total		24	4	0	0	0	0	24	4
Olympic FC	2021	NPL Queensland	27	14	4	1	0	0	31	15
Olympic FC	2022	NPL Queensland	23	13	4	2	0	0	27	15
Olympic FC	Olympic total		50	27	8	3	0	0	58	30
Career total			96	38	11	3	5	0	122	41

== Honours ==
Brisbane Roar Youth

- Y-League: 2018–19

Gold Coast Knights

- NPL Queensland Championship: 2019

Olympic FC

- NPL Queensland Championship runner-up: 2021, 2022
