= Ersan Keleş =

Turkish-Belgian futsal player

Ersan Keleş (also known as Ersan Keles in Belgium) (born January 12, 1987) is a Turkish-Belgian futsal player. He currently plays for Paraske Bowl Morlanwelz and previously played for Charleroi Action 21.

He is a member of the Turkey national futsal team in the UEFA Futsal Championship.
