= Jayden Leader =

Australian soccer player

Personal information
- Full name: Jayden Leader
- Date of birth: 4 April 2003 (age 23)
- Place of birth: Australia
- Position: Midfielder

Team information
- Current team: Armadale SC

Youth career
- Perth SC
- Perth Glory

Senior career*
Years	Team	Apps	(Gls)
2019–2022	Perth Glory NPL	30	(2)
2021–2022	Perth Glory	0	(0)
2023	Rockingham City	9	(6)
2024 -	Armadale SC	3	(0)
- * Club domestic league appearances and goals as of 10 February 2024

Jayden Leader (born 4 April 2003) is an Australian professional soccer player who plays as a midfielder for Armadale SC. He made his professional debut in a FFA Cup playoff match against Melbourne Victory on 24 November 2021.
