= Ersin Erçin =

Turkish diplomat

Ambassador, Special Envoy Ersin Erçin

Ambassador to the Federative Republic of Brazil
- In office 2009–2013

Minister Counselor, Deputy Director-General, Department of North and South America, MFA.
- In office 2007–2009

Deputy Permanent Representative to the United Nations, New York.
- In office 2004–2007

Deputy Permanent Representative to the OSCE, Vienna.
- In office 2001–2004

Personal details
- Born: 21 January 1959 (age 67) Ankara, Turkey
- Education: University of Ankara
- Website: mfa.gov.tr

Ambassador Ersin Erçin is a senior Turkish diplomat, with an extensive experience in multilateral diplomacy particularly on matters of international, Euro-Atlantic and Eurasian security, disarmament, and economic and environmental security.

== Early life and career ==
Ersin Erçin has served in a range of positions in the Ministry of Foreign Affairs in Ankara, and in diplomatic missions in Europe, the Middle East, Africa, and Latin America. He has also earned multiple assignments to represent Turkey at multilateral and security organizations such as the Organisation for Economic Co-operation and Development (OECD) in Paris, the Conference on Security and Cooperation in Europe (CSCE), the Organization for Security and Cooperation in Europe (OSCE) in Vienna, and the United Nations in New York. Erçin has lectured at universities as well as civilian and military groups on the topics of early warning, crisis management, conflict prevention and resolution, and post-conflict rehabilitation.

After joining the Ministry of Foreign Affairs in 1981, Erçin served in the position of Third Secretary in the Department of Economic Relations and later as Second Secretary for the Turkish Permanent Delegation to the OECD in Paris. From 1989, he continued with consecutive and increasingly senior assignments in Vienna at the CSCE and, later, the newly named OSCE, the largest regional security organization in the world. He served at OSCE as Turkey's deputy permanent representative from 2001 to 2004.

In 2004, he was selected as Turkey's Deputy Permanent Representative to the United Nations in New York and later as Minister Counselor for the Ministry's Department of North and South America. Earlier in his career, Erçin was posted to the Turkish Embassy in Khartoum, Sudan, with the rank of Second Secretary, and in Damascus, Syria, as Counselor. In 2009, he was appointed Ambassador to the Federative Republic of Brazil. Ambassador Erçin is a graduate of the Faculty of Political Science, University of Ankara, with a specialization in international relations and organizations.

== Chronology ==
Year	Event
1982	Joined the Ministry of Foreign Affairs (MFA) of the Republic of Turkey.
1982	Third Secretary, Department of Economic Relations.
1984	Second Secretary, Turkish Permanent Delegation to the Organisation for Economic Co-operation and Development (OECD), Paris.
1987	Second Secretary, Embassy of the Republic of Turkey in Khartoum/Sudan.
1989	First Secretary, Department of International Security Disarmament and Conference on Security and Co-operation in Europe (CSCE), and NATO, MFA.
1991	First Secretary, Turkish Permanent Delegation to the Conference for Security and Co-operation in Europe (CSCE), Vienna.
1995	Counselor, Embassy of the Republic of Turkey in Damascus/Syria.
1998	Head of Department of Maritime Affairs, MFA (represented Turkey at the International Maritime Organization).
2001	Deputy Permanent Representative, Turkish Permanent Representation to the OSCE, Vienna.
2004	Deputy Permanent Representative, Turkish Permanent Representation to the United Nations, New York.
2007	Minister Counselor, Deputy Director-General, Department of North and South America, MFA.
2009 - 2013	Ambassador Plenipotentiary to the Federative Republic of Brazil.
2010	Special Envoy of the HE Abdullah Gül President of the Republic of Turkey for European Security.
2011	Turkey's candidate for the Secretary General of the Organization for Security Cooperation in Europe(OSCE) in Vienna.
2014	Director General for Asia Pacific, Ministry of Foreign Affairs.
2018	Ambassador Plenipotentiary to the Republic of Korea (Accredited to the Democratic People's Republic of Korea).

== See also ==
- Organisation for Economic Co-operation and Development (OECD)
- Organization for Security and Co-operation in Europe (OSCE)
- North Atlantic Treaty Organization (NATO)
- List of diplomatic missions of Turkey
