= Ersen =

Ersen is a Turkish masculine given name. It refers to something that is not difficult. The word is also used as a surname in Turkey.

Notable people with the name include:

== Given name ==
- Ersen Dinleten, founder of Turkish rock band Ersen ve Dadaşlar
- Ersen Martin (1979–2024), Turkish football player

== Surname ==
- Murat Ersen (born 1984), known by the stage name Muhabbet (born 1984), Turkish-German singer
