= Ersin Kaya =

Australian soccer player

Personal information
- Full name: Ersin Kaya
- Date of birth: 5 July 1993 (age 33)
- Place of birth: Melbourne, Australia
- Positions: Right wing; right back

Team information
- Current team: Sydenham Park

Youth career
- 2009: AIS
- 2012–2013: Melbourne City

Senior career*
Years	Team	Apps	(Gls)
2010	Hume City	1	(0)
2011	Moreland Zebras	21	(5)
2012–2014	Melbourne City	1	(0)
2013	Hume City	18	(1)
2014	Northcote City	9	(0)
2014	Werribee City	6	(1)
2015	Bayrampaşaspor	11	(0)
2016	Bulleen Lions	14	(2)
2017–2020	Hume City	57	(5)
2021–	Sydenham Park	3	(0)

International career
- Australia U17
- * Club domestic league appearances and goals as of 30 September 2021

Ersin Kaya (born 5 July 1993) is an Australian footballer who last played as a right winger or right back for National Premier Leagues Victoria club Hume City.

== Club career ==
After being a part of the Australian Institute of Sport set-up in 2009, Ersin Kaya signed for Turkish-backed Victorian Premier League club Hume City FC in 2010. Kaya then moved to Victorian State League Division 1 side Moreland Zebras, where he linked up with current coach Domenic Barba. Kaya won promotion to the VPL with the Zebras at the age of 17. After that, Kaya joined the Melbourne Heart youth squad in 2012, before returning to play VPL with Hume City FC, Northcote City FC and Werribee City FC. He then spent a year in Turkey with Bayrampasaspor before returning to Victoria, joining the newly promoted FC Bulleen Lions in 2016.
