= Brisbane Roar FC Youth =

Brisbane Roar Youth
- Full name: Brisbane Roar Football Club Youth
- Nickname: Young Roar
- Founded: 2008
- Ground: A.J. Kelly Park
- Capacity: 3000
- Owner: Bakrie Group
- Chairman: Rahim Soekasah
- Head Coach: Karl Dodd
- League: NPL Queensland; A-League Youth
- 2026: 12th of 12 (relegated); FQPL
Home colours	Away colours

Brisbane Roar Football Club Youth is the youth system of Brisbane Roar Football Club based in Brisbane, Queensland, Australia. The team plays in the National Premier Leagues, the second level of the soccer pyramid in Australia.

Brisbane Roar Under-23s, is the second team within the academy, functioning as a reserve team on matchdays.

== Players ==
=== NPLQLD ===
These are the players that play in the National Premier Leagues Queensland and are also eligible to play with the senior squad.

As of 22 January 2026

Note: Flags indicate national team as defined under FIFA eligibility rules; some limited exceptions apply. Players may hold more than one non-FIFA nationality.

No.	Pos.	Nation	Player
—	DF	AUS	Charlie Parkin
—	DF	NZL	Jackson O'Reilly
—	DF	AUS	Roman Canosa
—	FW	AUS	Mikael Evagorou-Alao
—	MF	AUS	Taj Sorensen
—	FW	AUS	Niall Thom
—	GK	AUS	George Plusnin
—	MF	AUS	Emmett Shaw
—	MF	AUS	James Durrington
—	FW	AUS	Aaron Morris
—	FW	AUS	Rhys Williams
—	GK	AUS	Oscar Page
—	DF	AUS	Kade Kerry

No.	Pos.	Nation	Player
—	DF	AUS	Harry Marshall
—	FW	AUS	Carter Hammond
—	DF	AUS	Nelson Deng
—	DF	AUS	Archie Mitchell
—	DF	AUS	Adam Shaker
—	FW	AUS	Zach Harrison
—	GK	AUS	Tyson Rusden
—	DF	AUS	Oscar Myers
—	MF	AUS	Khodar Abdulkarim
—	MF	AUS	Jory Schneider
—	DF	AUS	Riley Bond
—	MF	AUS	Jack Flanagan
—	MF	AUS	Ianni Valkanis

== Staff ==
(Spain) Borja Souto	NPL Head Coach
(Liberia) Sekou Jomanday	NPL Assistant Coach
(England) Tom Collins	NPL Goalkeeping Coach

== History ==
=== Brisbane Roar Youth (2008–2019) ===
The National Youth League team was founded in 2008 as a Brisbane Roar (then Queensland Roar) representative for the inaugural season of the National Youth League competition.

On 1 February 2019, Brisbane Roar Youth were crowned Champions for the first time in the Y-League winning 3–1 over Western Sydney Wanderers U21 with the three goals coming from Shannon Brady, Daniel Leck and Mirza Muratovic.

=== Brisbane Roar Academy (2015–present) ===
In January 2014, it was confirmed that the NPL team would compete in the National Premier Leagues Queensland competition for 2014 season onwards.

In January 2017, Brisbane Roar announced their new under-20s team to be played in the National Premier Leagues Queensland U-20.

On 1 February 2019, Brisbane Roar Youth were crowned Champions for the first time in the Y-League winning 3–1 over Western Sydney Wanderers U21 with the three goals coming from Shannon Brady, Daniel Leck and Mirza Muratovic.

== Honours ==
NPLQ Seniors

- Premiership
  - Runners-up : 2021

Y-League

- Premiership
  - Winners: 2018–19
  - Runners-up : 2011–12, 2014–15, 2015–16, 2016–17
- Grand Final
  - Winners : 2019

== See also ==
- Brisbane Roar FC
- Brisbane Roar FC (W-League)
