= 2011–12 Brisbane Roar FC season =

Coordinates: 27°27′53″S 153°0′34″E

Brisbane Roar
2011–12 season
- Chairman: Eugenie Buckley; Michael Bowers (caretaker); Dali Tahir
- Manager: Ange Postecoglou
- A-League: 2nd
- Finals: Champions (1st)
- AFC Champions League: Group stage (4th)
- Top goalscorer: League: Besart Berisha (19 goals); All: Besart Berisha (23 goals)
- Highest home attendance: League: 19,339 vs Perth Glory, 26 November 2011 (Round 8); All: 50,334 vs Perth Glory, 22 April 2012 (grand final)
- Lowest home attendance: League: 9,293 vs Newcastle Jets, 28 January 2012 (Round 19); All: 5,615 vs Beijing Guoan, 16 May 2012 (ACL matchday 6)
- Average home league attendance: League: 15,963; All: 14,673
Home colours	Away colours

The 2011–12 season is Brisbane Roar's seventh season in the A-League. Brisbane successfully defended their Championship by defeating Perth Glory 2–1 in front of 50,344, but relinquished the Premiership to Central Coast Mariners, who ended the regular season 2 points ahead of the Roar, with the result going to down to the last day of the regular season. They will compete in the 2012 Asian Champions League, for finishing the regular season first. On 2 August 2011, the club confirmed they would be supplied with kits and training gear by German multinational apparel company Puma. It is the first time in the history of the club and A-League that they will not be wearing a kit that is made by Reebok.

On 4 October 2011, four days out from the start of the 2011–12 A-League season, The World Game reported that the Bakrie Group had struck a 10-year deal to take 70% ownership of the club, with the other 30% being occupied by the FFA. The deal was officially unveiled by the club on Friday, the day before the club faced Central Coast Mariners in a grand final rematch of the previous season. On 6 February 2012, it was announced that the Bakrie Group had acquired the full 100% stake in the club. Brisbane went on a 36-game undefeated streak, breaking the Australian football code record set by the Eastern Suburbs rugby league team in 1935–37 (35 games).

== Managers ==
- (Australia) Ange Postecoglou – (16 October 2009 – 24 April 2012)
- (Australia) Rado Vidošić – (25 April 2012 – Current)

On 24 April, Championship winning coach Ange Postecoglou, resigned from is post as manager just days after winning his second back to back championship for the Roar. The following day, long serving assistant manager and youth team coach Rado Vidošić was named successor to makes his return to head coach of the Roar having served as caretaker for one game after the sacking of former coach Frank Farina.

== Squad lineup for 2011/12 ==
Correct as of 2 February 2012 – players numbers as per the official Brisbane Roar website
Note: Flags indicate national team as defined under FIFA eligibility rules; some limited exceptions apply. Players may hold more than one non-FIFA nationality.

No.	Pos.	Nation	Player
1	GK	AUS	Michael Theoklitos
2	DF	AUS	Matt Smith (Captain)
3	DF	AUS	Shane Stefanutto (Vice Captain)
4	DF	AUS	Matthew Jurman
5	DF	AUS	Ivan Franjic
6	MF	AUS	Erik Paartalu
7	FW	ALB	Besart Berisha
8	MF	AUS	Massimo Murdocca
9	FW	AUS	Kofi Danning (Youth)
10	FW	BRA	Henrique
11	MF	CAN	Issey Nakajima-Farran
12	DF	AUS	Matt Mundy
14	MF	AUS	Rocky Visconte (Youth)

No.	Pos.	Nation	Player
16	DF	BHR	Sayed Mohamed Adnan
17	MF	AUS	Mitch Nichols
18	MF	AUS	Luke Brattan (Youth)
19	DF	SRI	Jack Hingert (Youth)
20	GK	AUS	Andrew Redmayne
21	MF	AUS	James Meyer
22	MF	GER	Thomas Broich
24	FW	AUS	Nicholas Fitzgerald (Youth)
25	MF	AUS	George Lambadaridis (Youth)
26	DF	AUS	Corey Brown (Youth)
28	FW	AUS	Anthony Proia (Youth)
29	DF	AUS	James Donachie (Youth)

Successful Trialists

- (Australia) Nicholas Fitzgerald from Central Coast Mariners Youth Team (Note: Football Federation Australia regulations allow for 3 players young enough to play in the NYL to be paid full-time wages outside the A-League salary cap.)
- (Australia) George Lambadaridis from Club Brugge
- (Australia) Corey Brown from AIS
- (Australia) Brandon Borello from QAS
- (New Zealand) Jack Bladen from Macarthur Rams
- (Australia) Tomislav Cirjak from Sydney FC Youth Team
- (Australia) Jason Geria from AIS

Notes

Unsuccessful Trialists

- (Australia) Alan De La Cuadra from Macarthur Rams
- (Australia) Daniel Angelucci from Macarthur Rams
- (Scotland) Paul-Jon Sludden from Taringa Rovers
- (Italy) Stefano Salandra from Ponte S Pietro
- (Australia) Joshua Jokic from Delta State University
- (Germany) Nikolas Schmitz from 1. FC Köln
- (Australia) Michael Hibbert from Free agent

== Transfers ==
=== In ===
Date	Pos.	Name	From	Contract (Season end)	Fee	Notes
10 February 2011	DF	(Australia) Matthew Jurman	(Australia) Sydney FC	2012/13	Free	
27 June 2011	FW	(Australia) Kofi Danning	Free Agent	2012/13	N/A	
4 July 2011	DF	(Sri Lanka) Jack Hingert	(Australia) Dandenong Thunder	2012/13	Free	
16 August 2011	DF	(Bahrain) Sayed Mohamed Adnan	Free Agent	2011/12	N/A	
16 August 2011	FW	(Albania) Besart Berisha	(Germany) Arminia Bielefeld	2011/12	Free	Resigned to 2013/14.
30 August 2011	MF	(Canada) Issey Nakajima-Farran	(Denmark) AC Horsens	2011/12	Free	
23 September 2011	DF	(Australia) Corey Brown	(Australia) Australian Institute of Sport	2012/13	Free	
23 September 2011	MF	(Australia) George Lambadaridis	(Belgium) Club Brugge	2012/13	Free	
23 September 2011	FW	(Australia) Nicholas Fitzgerald	(Australia) Central Coast Mariners Youth Team	2012/13	Free	
2 February 2012	FW	(Australia) Anthony Proia	(Australia) Australian Institute of Sport	2013/14	Free	

=== Out ===
Date	Pos.	Name	To	Fee
17 March 2011	DF	(Australia) Milan Susak	(Indonesia) Minangkabau F.C.	Undisclosed
28 March 2011	FW	(Costa Rica) Jean Carlos Solórzano	(Australia) Melbourne Victory	End of loan
16 July 2011	FW	(New Zealand) Kosta Barbarouses	(Russia) FC Alania Vladikavkaz	Undisclosed
25 August 2011	MF	(Australia) Matt McKay	(Scotland) Rangers F.C.	Undisclosed

== Season ==
=== Season recap ===
On 10 February 2011, Brisbane Roar announced the signing of talented young defender Matthew Jurman from Sydney FC, to take the spot left open by Luke DeVere from the previous season. After making a solid return to the A League after spending a few years in Germany, defender Milan Susak jetted off to Indonesia to play for Minangkabau F.C. in Liga Primer Indonesia. After weeks of speculation about his impending move to Melbourne Victory, it was revealed on 28 March that Costa Rican forward Jean Carlos Solórzano had indeed made the move south. Football Federation Australia made their first bit of business after taking back the license, other than re-signing Ange Postecoglou, by having Roar CEO Peter McLennan step down at the end of April.

It was revealed by both the Roar and the Courier Mail that Eugenie Buckley, a sports lawyer that helped out with the formation of the A League and its push into Asia, had become the new general manager for the team, taking over from the spot left by Peter McLennan. On 2 May, it was announced that Rocky Visconte had signed a deal with the club for a further two seasons after coming off contract with the club at the end of the season. On 21 June, former Socceroo Paul Trimboli was appointed the general manager of Football, a role that was expanded from the position of Football Manager, held previously by Thiago Cruz.

On 27 June, the club announced it had signed current Young Socceroo Kofi Danning, who was released by Sydney FC at the end of the 2010–11 A-League Season. On 4 July 2011, the Roar announced they had signed young Australian defender Jack Hingert from Dandenong Thunder. On 16 July 2011, the Roar revealed that leading goalscorer from the 10/11 season, Kosta Barbarouses, had signed with Russian outfit FC Alania Vladikavkaz on a 3yr deal. On 2 August 2011, the Roar announced they had signed a 3yr deal with apparel company Puma.

After much speculation in the media, former Bahraini International Sayed Mohamed Adnan signed a 1yr deal on 16 August 2011. Just a day later, the Roar announced a second signing in Albanian International striker Besart Berisha. The striker impressed Roar assistant coach Rado Vidosic during a match for German outfit Arminia Bielefeld, where the Roar Youth team coach was watching his son Dario Vidosic, who was then on loan from German Bundesliga side 1. FC Nürnberg. After over a month of uncertainty, the Roar were left with a massive hole in the side when skipper and original Roar player/captain Matt McKay was granted a UK working visa for his move to Scottish Premier League side Glasgow Rangers FC on 25 August.

On 30 August 2011, the club announced they had signed Canadian International midfielder Issey Nakajima-Farran from Danish top-flight team AC Horsens on a one-year deal. On 5 September 2011, the club released their kits for the upcoming season.

The day after the kit unveiling, the club announced Matt Smith as the successor to Matt McKay's captaincy, with the midfielder having moved to Glasgow Rangers FC. On 20 September, CEO Eugenie Buckley announced her departure, stepping down after her contract runs out, believed to be at the end of September. For Brisbane Lions CEO Michael Bowers will take the reins of the club for the time being, until new owners are found for the Roar. On 23 September, the Roar announce they had signed 3 young Australians (Nicholas Fitzgerald, George Lambadaridis & Corey Brown), each to two-year contracts. Football Federation Australia regulations allow for 3 players young enough to play in the NYL to be paid full-time wages outside the A-League salary cap.

On 4 October 2011, it was announced that the Bakrie family had acquired 70% of the club for a fee thought to be around $8M. The new Chairman of the club will be former AFC executive committee member Dali Tahir. On 28 October 2011, the Roar set a record for the biggest victory by the club, beating Adelaide United 7–1 at Suncorp Stadium. The scoreline also created another record, being the most goals in a match with 8. New striker Besart Berisha also created history, scoring the most goals in a game for Brisbane with 4. The Roar went on to draw their following 2 games, 2–2 away vs Melbourne Victory and 1–1 at home to Wellington Phoenix. The style of play being played against the Roar was described as "parking the bus", a term meaning the opposition side would defend, with most, if not all, players behind the ball to protect the scoreline.

The following week, Brisbane recorded a 2–1 win away to Newcastle Jets, with the result being the Roar's 35th consecutive unbeaten match, equaling the 74-year-old record for all Australian sporting codes, held by Rugby league Eastern Suburbs, who are now known as the Sydney Roosters. A week later, Brisbane defeated Perth Glory 4–0 at home, the team's 36th consecutive match without loss, to set a record for the longest unbeaten streak at the top level of any football code in Australia. The Roar's streak came to an end a week later against Sydney FC in wet and windy conditions at WIN Jubilee Oval. A goal in the first minute and another 20 minutes later saw the Roar lose for just the second time in 42 matches.

On 6 December 2011, the draw for the group stages of the 2012 Asian Champions League was made. The Roar, drawn in Group F faced the winners of the Japanese 2011 Emperor's Cup winners and 2011 J. League Division 2 champions F.C. Tokyo, 2011 K-League runners-up Ulsan Hyundai & 2011 Chinese Super League runners-up Beijing Guoan.

Following the defeat to Sydney FC, the Roar then suffered a succession of defeats to Melbourne Heart (1–2 at home), Wellington Phoenix (0–2 away), Central Coast Mariners (1–2 at home) and Gold Coast United (0–1 away). The defeats coincided with the loss of key first team players Thomas Broich, Henrique, Mitch Nichols, James Meyer and club captain, Matt Smith. In addition to a poor spell of form and injuries, the Roar were on the end of some contentious refereeing decision, no more notable than the 88-minute penalty awarded to Gold Coast United for a foul that appeared to have occurred outside the penalty box. This defeat consigned the Roar to their longest losing streak to date of 5 matches.

In Round 14, in front of a home crowd, the club snapped their losing streak in unlikely style. The Roar came from behind after conceding an early goal to win 3–1 against a star-studded Melbourne Victory. The Roar followed this up in Rounds 15 and 16 with draws away from home against Perth Glory (3–3) and Adelaide United (1–1). Like, the defeat to Gold Coast in Round 13, both matches were overshadowed by contentious penalty decisions which cost the Roar a potential win on both occasions. In their Round 15 clash with Perth Glory, it looked as though Brisbane's form slump continued as they conceded two early goals to the Perth side, only to come back to be leading 3–2 with 20 minutes to play. However, in the 79th minute, referee Chris Beath pointed to the spot after Mile Sterjovski went down softly under the challenge of Ivan Franjic, the penalty was converted by Sterjovski and the Roar came away with only one point. The Roar's bad luck with the match officials continued in their Round 16 draw with Adelaide United. The Roar dominated the match in terms of possession and chances and were awarded with a goal to winger, Issey Nakajima-Farran with a half-hour to play. However, for the second match running, in the 79th minute referee Ben Williams awarded Adelaide a dubious penalty. Matt Smith appeared to be accidentally tripped by Adelaide striker Bruce Djite, former Roar striker Sergio van Dijk then fell over the fallen Roar captain and the penalty was awarded. The penalty was converted and Brisbane again went home with just a single point.

In the buildup to the Round 17 clash with Sydney FC, Ange Postecoglou announced that key playmakers Thomas Broich and Henrique who were returning from injury were likely to feature. Both Broich and Henrique made their return, both coming on as 56th-minute substitutes as the Roar completed a come-from-behind win in spectacular fashion. Mark Bridge gave Sydney a 39th-minute lead, before Sayed Mohamed Adnan curled a sumptuous 25-yard free-kick over the wall in the fourth minute of the allocated five minutes' injury time. Besart Berisha completed the stunning comeback with just 15 seconds remaining, netting his 10th goal of the season after some good buildup play on the left from Shane Stefanutto. At the end of the game, Besart Berisha took off his shirt whilst running towards Sydney FC defender Pascal Bosschaart before grabbing his arm and gesturing towards the players tunnel. This caused an altercation between the two sides, with teammates wrestling with one another and against players from the opposition side. The actions from Berisha were thought to have stemmed from the last time the two teams played each other, where it was alleged that Bosschaart made derogatory comments towards Berisha's family.

Later that week, Berisha was sent a "Please explain" letter by Football Federation Australia following his actions the resulted in the post match altercation. The Roar had the option of accepting a 1 match ban or opting to choose whether or not to appeal. The club chose the latter, allowing the striker to play against Melbourne Heart the following week. The match against the Heart ended 1–1 in controversial fashion with Berisha scoring the leveling goal for the Roar, after an earlier Jonatan Germano goal had put the Heart in front. In the week following the draw, the club opted to not appeal the suspension, resulting in the Albanian striker missing the 1–0 home defeat to Newcastle Jets the following week. On 2 February 2012, the club announced the signing of 17-year-old Young Socceroo Anthony Proia on a 2 1/2-year contract.

The following round, Brisbane stunned the league leaders' Central Coast Mariners at Bluetongue Stadium running out 2–0 winners thanks to first-half goals from Besart Berisha and Erik Paartalu, keeping intact the Roar's unbeaten record at the Gosford venue. The Roar then went on to record back-to-back wins the following round away against second placed Wellington Phoenix. A first time volleyed Besart Berisha goal on the stroke of half-time after an inch perfect lob over the top of the Phoenix defence gave the Roar the lead. Despite looking to let the Phoenix back into the game, returning Olyroo Mitch Nichols settled the game with his seventh goal of the season – a curling long-range effort that gave Wellington 'keeper Mark Paston no chance. This game also saw Massimo Murdocca equal the club appearance record of 131, held by former captain Matt McKay.

Prior to the Phoenix match, on 6 February 2012, The Bakrie Group announced that it had acquired 100% ownership of the club. On 14 February 2012, it was announced that striker Besart Berisha had agreed a new two-year contract extension, taking him through to the end of the 2013/14 season. On 18 February 2012, the Roar saw 2 club records broken as they defeated Melbourne Victory 3–2. Massimo Murdocca became the most capped player for the Roar, playing in his 132nd match on the night that he also picked up the Man of the Match award. Albanian striker Besart Berisha also became a record holder, scoring both his 14th and 15th goals respectively to become the club's highest scoring player in a single season, surpassing the 13 held by Sergio van Dijk scored in the 2008–09 A-League season.

The following round, the Roar played away to Perth Glory, winning the game 3–0 with Besart Berisha scoring 2 goals after Henrique opened the scoring. The Brazilian was also sent off after slapping Jacob Burns in the throat following a nasty challenge by the former Socceroo. Henrique picked up the mandatory 1-game suspension, with the Match Review Panel adding 1 game to the ban. In Round 24, the following round to the Perth game, the Roar had the chance to claim equal first on the ladder, with the Central Coast Mariners to play the following day, if they beat Melbourne Heart at home that night. The Roar went up 1–0 via Mitch Nichols with Heart youngster Curtis Good leveling the scores in the 49th minute. With the scores locked at 1–1, Roar and league topscorer Besart Berisha won a penalty in the 3rd minute of extra time. Bahraini International Sayed Mohamed Adnan stepped up to take the spot kick, blasting it to the top left hand corner of the goal only for Heart Goalkeeper Clint Bolton to get a hand to it and turn it past the post for a corner which eventuated to nothing.

Mid week the Roar made their AFC Champions League debut at home to J-League outfit FC Tokyo. The match turned out to be a baptism of fire with the Roar unable to contain the Japanese team, losing 2–0 with goals from Tatsuya Yazawa and Aria Jasuru Hasegawa. At the end of the week, the Roar played at home again on 11 March 2012 against then 2nd last team Adelaide United, with the chance to go equal first again after the Mariners drew 1–1 the previous week. With that in mind, the Roar conceded first through a counterattack, with speedster Ian Ramsay opening the scoring via a low cross by Bruce Djite. The Roar were given some hope when in form striker Besart Berisha scored in the 70th minute. The hope in the match came to nothing however with the match ending 1–1. The hope, though, rolled over to the next match between the Central Coast Mariners and Perth Glory when an uncharacteristic error by Matt Ryan led to the only goal by Travis Dodd. The result meant the Roar trailed top spot by 2 points with 2 games left in the regular season.

On 17 March 2012, the Roar played away to Newcastle Jets with the Central Coast Mariners playing at the same time against Adelaide United. The Roar went up 1–0 through a toe-poked goal by Berisha before a sublime free kick by Ali Abbas leaving Michael Theoklitos stranded to level the scores at 1–1. The Roar got a Penalty after a foul on Jack Hingert. Henrique took the penalty but it was hit poorly, making an easy save for Ben Kennedy. During the match, the Mariners scored through Bernie Ibini-Isei, meaning the Roar have to win to keep their title hopes alive. They got another chance to take the lead when a foul on Erik Paartalu got another penalty for the away side. This time they benefited through Mitch Nichols, who scored the winning goal, leaving the race for the title to go down to the final round. Before that could happen, the Roar travelled to China to face Beijing Guoan on Matchday 2. The Roar went down 1–0 in the 8th minute through Piao Cheng. The Roar scored 13 minutes later though, with a cross from Ivan Franjic being headed home by Mitch Nichols to level the score. The Roar dominated the rest of the first half but were not able to add to the 1 goal they had scored. The tide turned though in the second with the Roar being outplayed for most of the second half. The Roar started to get the upper hand at the back end of the second half but neither sides being able to take their chances

With the Roar to face Gold Coast United in the M1 Derby in the last round, the Roar had to hope that Wellington Phoenix would draw or defeat the Mariners to have any hope of clinching the Minor Premiership for the second straight season. The opposite of what the Roar wanted happened, with the Mariners winning 2–1, meaning the Roar rested most of their first XI in preparation for the major semi-final 1st leg at home the following week. James Donachie made his debut for the club at Centre Back with other young players making up the starting XI and bench spots. Andrew Redmayne also made his first start for the club against the only side he'd played against in a Roar jersey. The Roar went down 1–0 to ex-Roar player Daniel Bowles and went into Half-Time down by the goal. The Roar came out hungry to gather some form prior to the Finals series and got a goal through young prodigy Nicholas Fitzgerald, who scored his first A-League and Roar goal with an assist by the inside of the frame of the goal. In the last minute of the regulated time, another youngster in George Lambadaridis scored the winning goal with a curling left footed effort from outside the penalty area to win the game 2–1.

With the 2 legged Semi-final teams already being known prior, the Roar hosted the first leg of the tie on 31, 4 March days before the club faced Ulsan Hyundai FC. The Roar gained the advantage for the second leg, keeping a clean sheet as they ran out 2–0 winners. Goals by Henrique and Erik Paartalu saw the club in good stead for the return fixture a week later. The only sour bit of the first leg was a missed penalty by Henrique, just a minute before he put the home side ahead. The boys flew out the following day to South Korea, where they faced K-League outfit Ulsan Hyundai. The Roar grabbed the first goal and went into half time 1–0 courtesy of a well-crafted goal taken by youngster Nicholas Fitzgerald. Just 2 minutes into the second half, the Roar conceded a penalty through Matthew Jurman, who was sent off with a straight red card. The Roar was reprieved as goalkeeper Michael Theoklitos parried the effort to keeper the away side ahead. The save counted for little when the home side grabbed an equaliser 4 minutes later, started via a corner. The corner kick was cleared only for it to be crossed back in, with central defender Lee Jae-Seong swinging his left foot to drill the ball into the back of the net.

The Roar returned to Australia to play the second leg of the major semi-final. With the Central Coast Mariners needing to score 3 goals at minimum to host the grand final, the home side's hopes took a dent with a Thomas Broich's free kick floating untouched past the crowd of players into the far side of the net after just 2 minutes of play. In the 26th minute, the Roar went up 2–0 after a lovely passing move saw the ball at the feet of Mitch Nichols, who scored his 10th A-League goal of the season. The visitors conceded just 3 minutes where a long striker by Patrick Zwaanswijk went into the bottom corner of the net. Another 3 minutes passed before the game was level once more through striker Adam Kwasnik, found a small amount of space to guide the ball into the same corner of the net. With the sides locked at 2–2, it meant the Mariners needed to score another 3 goals and not concede to win the hosting right of the Grans Final. With their chances slim at best, they were all but washed away when Henrique nutmegged Matt Ryan to pass the ball into the net to put the away side up 3–2. The match ended with that scoreline and the aggregate score at 5–2, meaning the Roar became the first side in A-League history to host, and later win, 2 consecutive grand finals.

Before they hosted their second consecutive grand final, they faced Ulsan Hyundai FC on the Tuesday before the grand final in a must win fixture to have any hope of continuing through to the knock-out phase of the 2012 AFC Champions League. Their chances hit a temporary snag when a sublime strike by Julián Estiven Vélez left goalkeeper Michael Theoklitos no chance of keeping the ball out of the net. With the strike swerving all over the place, the best effort by the custodian was to get a palm of the ball, doing little to help. A short while later, the Roar grabbed their equaliser, where a cross field ball was attempted to be centered by Shane Stefanutto. The attempt went at defender Kwak Tae-Hwi, taking a minor deflection that guided it past the South Korean's goalkeeper. Although the ball's course was diverted, it was deemed not to be an own goal, gifting the Roar left-back his first goal for the club. Things, however, ended in vain where a contentious penalty was given when Sayed Mohamed Adnan was adjudged to have fouled one of the Ulsan Hyundai players. Ironically, Kwak Tae-Hwi converted the penalty to give Ulsan Hyundai FC the win. The Roar turned their focus to the buildup of the grand final, dubbed "Orange Sunday II". With all the buildup, the lingering rumours of coach Ange Postecoglou leaving the club were the only dampener on a grand final that created history, regardless of the winner or result.

The big day came on 22 April 2012, a day that created a number historic moments. The crowd was decked out in orange and purple, the colours of both respective clubs. The first bit of history was made before the whistle sounded, with the size of the crowd reaching 50,334, becoming Brisbane Roar's largest ever attendance, with 166 more people attending than that of last year's attendance of 50,168. Kick off sounded at 4 pm (UTC+10:00), where Perth Glory had the bulk of possession in the first 5–10 minutes. Brisbane started to work their way back into the game, having a number of chances to score early but failed to take advantage of them. The away side started to level out the game, pressuring every pass and movement the host team made. Both sides counted the other side out, leading the score going into half time at 0–0. The away side came out in the second half the same way they started the first, pressuring the Roar and creating a number of chances. The Glory got the opener of the match, where a cross by Travis Dodd took a major deflection off Ivan Franjic, rolling into the back of the net to give the Perth side the lead. The Roar started to dominate the match, as they had done most of the season, nearly scoring a number of times. Things didn't change much, until the 84th minute, where a teasing cross by Johnny Warren Medal winner Thomas Broich was met with a precise header Golden Boot winner Besart Berisha. The Albanian was the first player to score more than 20 goals in a full season, making another historic moment. The Roar continued to push for the win, and just 6 minutes after the goal, in the 90th minute, they got the upper hand, when Glory left-back Dean Heffernan collected his second yellow card, after a foul on Broich, to be sent off.

Things fell the way of the home side, when a contentious penalty was given after a lunging tackle from behind on Berisha by Glory midfielder Liam Miller was adjudged to have made contact on the Albanian striker as he was about to take a shot on goal after weaving through the Glory defence. Despite Perth Glory players' best efforts to appeal the decision by referee of the year Jarred Gillett, the penalty stood and the Brisbane striker lined up, and converted successfully, to get the winning goal to send the biggest crowd to attend a football match at Suncorp Stadium into raptures in the last minute of extra time. Post game, Glory captain Jacob Burns condemned the decision, saying the "decision cost us (Perth) the game". Despite the Joe Marston medal being announced to have gone to Broich, the real winner, Jacob Burns, was announced to have won via Twitter and the official A-League website. Just two days later, the Roar was honored for their achievements with a ticker tape parade, with the side showing off their defended silverware in front of thousands of adhering Roar fans. This was soured just an hour later, where the rumours of Ange Postecoglou leaving the side were confirmed, as the master coach resigned from the post of head coach of the club, effective immediately.

Just the following day, Rado Vidošić was appointed the head coach, signing a 5-year contract to graduate to the head role having served under all three former head coaches in Miron Bleiberg, Frank Farina and the departed Ange Postecoglou. The Roar had a short turn around after their heroics against Perth Glory, taking on FC Tokyo in matchday 5 of the 2012 AFC Champions League. Despite getting the first goal through Besart Berisha early on, the Roar went on to lose the game 4–2 in a thrilling game showcase by the slick attacks and end to end football. Needing to win to keep their hopes of progressing to the group stages, the loss spelled the end of their campaign in Asia. Just 3 days later, the Roar staged their annual awards night, with star Albanian striker Besart Berisha taking all the top awards for the night, including the famed Gary Wilkins Medal. Things took a sour note though, with recently departed coach Postecoglou being banned from attending the awards ceremony. Throughout the week, rumours began to stem from the media that the Roar were locking horns with Ange Postecoglou's Melbourne Victory for the signature of in demand ex-Gold Coast United striker Ben Halloran. The Cairns product eventually signed a 3-year deal with the Roar, citing it was the best decision for his career to make the move to the Roar, with another factor being said for his desire to stay in Brisbane with his family.

Things turned to the last game of the season, a home game in the final game of the Group stages of the 2012 AFC Champions League. The game also marked the first home game of Rado Vidošić's tenure as Roar coach. The Roar took the lead through in form striker Berisha, with the Albanian scoring his 23rd goal of the season in 35 matches. The Roar, however, were pegged back through a cracking goal by Li Hanbo which flew into the top corner of the net. In front of the lowest crowd of the game, a mere 5,615, the Roar recorded their 3rd draw of the Asian Champions League to finish 4th in their group, with the Chinese side pinching 3rd on goal difference.

=== Pre-season ===
It was announced by the Roar on 5 July that the club would not be playing an overseas team in a match for the Translink Cup

Pre-Season Friendly; 3 June 2011	Redlands United (Australia)	0–1	(Australia) Brisbane Roar	Cleveland
19:00 UTC+10		(Report)	Franjic 53'	Stadium: Cleveland Showgrounds; Attendance: 2,138; Referee: Jim Bellos

Pre-Season Friendly; 8 June 2011	Peninsula Power (Australia)	0–3	(Australia) Brisbane Roar	Kippa-Ring
19:00 UTC+10		(Report)	Bush 33'; Sludden 63'; Schmitz 70+2'	Stadium: A.J. Kelly Park; Attendance: 2,364; Referee: Jason Crow

Pre-Season Friendly; 12 June 2011	Sunshine Coast Fire (Australia)	1–1	(Australia) Brisbane Roar	Kawana Waters
14:30 UTC+10	Holmes 39'	(Report)	Fitzgerald 65'	Stadium: Stockland Park; Attendance: 2,388; Referee: Alan Milliner

Pre-Season Friendly; 22 June 2011	Eastern Suburbs (Australia)	0–3	(Australia) Brisbane Roar	East Brisbane
19:00 UTC+10		(Report)	Barbarouses 32'; Fitzgerald (??); McKay (??)	Stadium: Heath Park; Attendance: 1,863; Referee: TBD

Pre-Season Friendly; 29 June 2011	Brisbane Olympic (Australia)	1–5	(Australia) Brisbane Roar	Yeronga
19:00 UTC+10	Chung 23'	(Report)	Murdocca 21'; Broich 28'; Nichols 73'; Barbarouses 80'; McKay 80+3'	Stadium: Goodwin Park; Attendance: TBC; Referee: Nathan McDonald

Pre-Season Friendly; 17 July 2011	Ipswich Invitational XI (Australia)	0–3	(Australia) Brisbane Roar	Ipswich
15:00 UTC+10		(Report)	Broich 11'; Nichols 57'; Quinn 90'	Stadium: QLD Group Stadium; Attendance: 3,914; Referee: Matthew Skinner

Pre-Season Friendly; 27 July 2011	Rochedale Rovers (Australia)	0–2	(Australia) Brisbane Roar	Rochedale
19:00 UTC+10		(Report)	Fitzgerald 57' 87'	Stadium: Underwood Park; Referee: David Wiebe

Pre-Season Friendly; 3 August 2011	Wynnum Wolves (Australia)	2–4	(Australia) Brisbane Roar	Tingalpa
19:00 UTC+10	Hopkins 16' (pen.); Clulow 30'	(Report)	Nichols 22' (pen.); Fitzgerald 26'; Meyer 59'; Jurman 72'	Stadium: Carmichael Park; Referee: Adam Kersey

Pre-Season Friendly; 10 August 2011	Brisbane City (Australia)	2–4	(Australia) Brisbane Roar	Newmarket
19:00 UTC+10	Shepherd 20'; Shepherd 38'	(Report)	Murdocca 11'; Brattan 53'; Cirjak 70'; Dougall 83'	Stadium: Spencer Park

Pre-Season Friendly; 16 August 2011	Brisbane Strikers (Australia)	0–5	(Australia) Brisbane Roar	Bowen Hills
19:00 UTC+10		(Report)	Meyer 4' 10'; Bush 64' 83'; Danning 67'	Stadium: Perry Park; Referee: Matt Gillett

Pre-Season Friendly; 20 August 2011	Wellington Phoenix (New Zealand)	1–5	(Australia) Brisbane Roar	Dunedin
17:30 UTC+12	Rigters 66'	(Report)	Meyer 46' 90+2'; Nichols 47'; Broich 57' 73'	Stadium: Forsyth Barr Stadium

Pre-Season Friendly; 27 August 2011	QSL Northern All Stars (Australia)	0–1	(Australia) Brisbane Roar	Bowen Hills (Note: Game was abandoned after half time due to rain. The Roar are credited the win in accordance with FIFA laws.)
16:15 UTC+10		(Report)	Nichols (??)	Stadium: Perry Park

Pre-Season Friendly; 11 September 2011	Melbourne Victory (Australia)	2–0	(Australia) Brisbane Roar	Launceston
14:00 UTC+10	Hernandez 39' (pen.); Allsopp 59'	(Report)		Stadium: Aurora Stadium; Attendance: 6,307

Pre-Season Friendly; 17 September 2011	Brisbane Roar (Australia)	0–3	(Australia) Adelaide United	Toowoomba
19:00 UTC+10	Murdocca 10' (o.g.); Djite 48'; Lastella 69'	(Report)		Stadium: Clive Berghofer Stadium; Referee: Adam Kersey

Pre-Season Friendly; 24 September 2011	University of Queensland FC (Australia)	0–3	(Australia) Brisbane Roar	St Lucia
15:00 UTC+10		(Report)	Meyer 2' 10' 15'	Stadium: St Lucia Campus

=== 2011–12 Hyundai A-League ===
==== Regular season ====
Round 1 Saturday, 8 October 2011	Brisbane Roar (Australia)	1–0	(Australia) Central Coast Mariners	Brisbane, Queensland
19:45 UTC+10	Nichols 71'	(Report) (Summary)		Stadium: Suncorp Stadium; Attendance: 13,467; Referee: Chris Beath

Round 2 Saturday, 15 October 2011	Sydney FC (Australia)	0–2	(Australia) Brisbane Roar	Sydney
19:45 UTC+11		(Report) (Summary)	Berisha 42'; Broich 70'	Stadium: Sydney Football Stadium; Attendance: 15,789; Referee: Strebre Delovski

Round 3 Friday, 21 October 2011	Brisbane Roar (Australia)	3–0	(Australia) Gold Coast United	Brisbane, Queensland
19:30 UTC+10	Paartalu 13'; Berisha 60'; Nichols 78'	(Report) (Summary)		Stadium: Suncorp Stadium; Attendance: 13,425; Referee: Peter Green

Round 4 Friday, 28 October 2011	Brisbane Roar (Australia)	7–1	(Australia) Adelaide United	Brisbane, Queensland
19:00 UTC+10	Henrique 21' (pen.), 36' (pen.); Berisha 23', 27', 29', 69'; Nakajima-Farran 81'	(Report) (Summary)	Vidosic 5'	Stadium: Suncorp Stadium; Attendance: 11,762; Referee: Strebre Dilovski

Round 5 Saturday, 5 November 2011	Melbourne Victory (Australia)	2–2	(Australia) Brisbane Roar	Melbourne
19:45 UTC+11	Archie Thompson 9', 20'; Covic (red card) 2'; Foschini (red card) 36'	(Report) (Summary)	Henrique 5' (pen.); Broich 27'	Stadium: Etihad Stadium; Attendance: 24,820; Referee: Ben Williams

Round 6 Sunday, 13 November 2011	Brisbane Roar (Australia)	1–1	(New Zealand) Wellington Phoenix	Brisbane, Queensland
16:00 UTC+10	Berisha 11'	(Report) (Summary)	Brown 36'	Stadium: Suncorp Stadium; Attendance: 16,428; Referee: Jarred Gillett

Round 7 Saturday, 19 November 2011	Newcastle Jets (Australia)	1–2	(Australia) Brisbane Roar	Newcastle, New South Wales
17:30 UTC+11	Griffiths 44'	(Report) (Summary)	Henrique 56'; Meyer 82'	Stadium: Ausgrid Stadium; Attendance: 13,173; Referee: Gerard Parsons

Round 8 Saturday, 26 November 2011	Brisbane Roar (Australia)	4–0	(Australia) Perth Glory	Brisbane, Queensland
18:45 UTC+10	Berisha 23' 45'; Nakajima-Farran 33' 41'	(Report) (Summary)		Stadium: Suncorp Stadium; Attendance: 19,339; Referee: Jarred Gillett

Round 9 Sunday, 4 December 2011	Sydney FC (Australia)	2–0	(Australia) Brisbane Roar	Kogarah, New South Wales
17:00 UTC+11	Petratos 1'; Emerton 19'	(Report) (Summary)		Stadium: WIN Jubilee; Attendance: 11,555; Referee: Peter Green

Round 10; Friday, 9 December 2011	Brisbane Roar (Australia)	1–2	(Australia) Melbourne Heart	Brisbane, Queensland
19:00 UTC+10	Nichols 78'	(Report) (Summary)	Germano 12'; Babalj 27'	Stadium: Suncorp Stadium; Attendance: 10,666; Referee: Kris Griffiths Jones

Round 11; Wednesday, 14 December 2011	Wellington Phoenix (New Zealand)	2–0	(Australia) Brisbane Roar	Dunedin, New Zealand
19:30 UTC+13	Ifill 27'; Ward 81'	(Report) (Summary)		Stadium: Forsyth Barr Stadium; Attendance: 4,628; Referee: Gerard Parsons

Round 12; Saturday, 17 December 2011	Brisbane Roar (Australia)	1–2	(Australia) Central Coast Mariners	Brisbane, Queensland
18:45 UTC+10	Danning 83'	(Report) (Summary)	Amini 6'; Bojic 45+2'	Stadium: Suncorp Stadium; Attendance: 10,006; Referee: Peter Green

Round 13; Monday, 26 December 2011	Gold Coast United (Australia)	1–0	(Australia) Brisbane Roar	Gold Coast, Queensland
18:30 UTC+10	Severino 88' (pen.)	(Report) (Summary)		Stadium: Skilled Park; Attendance: 6,927; Referee: Kris Griffiths-Jones

Round 14; Saturday, 31 December 2011	Brisbane Roar (Australia)	3–1	(Australia) Melbourne Victory	Brisbane, Queensland
19:30 UTC+10	Nichols 43'; Visconte 49'; Franjic 83'	(Report) (Summary)	Kewell 2'	Stadium: Suncorp Stadium; Attendance: 14,852; Referee: Jarrad Gillett

Round 15; Wednesday, 4 January 2012	Perth Glory (Australia)	3–3	(Australia) Brisbane Roar	Perth, Western Australia
19:00 UTC+8	Dodd 17'; Sterjovski 24' 79' (pen.)	(Report) (Summary)	Nichols 41' 69'; Paartalu 45+1'	Stadium: NIB Stadium; Attendance: 6,912; Referee: Chris Beath

Round 16; Saturday, 7 January 2012	Adelaide United (Australia)	1–1	(Australia) Brisbane Roar	Adelaide, South Australia
17:00 UTC+10:30	Van Dijk 79' (pen.)	(Report) (Summary)	Nakajima-Farran 60'	Stadium: Hindmarsh Stadium; Attendance: Ben Williams; Referee: 11,274

Round 17; Saturday, 14 January 2012	Brisbane Roar (Australia)	2–1	(Australia) Sydney FC	Brisbane, Queensland
18:45 UTC+10	Adnan 90+4'; Berisha 90+5'	(Report) (Summary)	Bridge 39'	Stadium: Suncorp Stadium; Attendance: 14,545; Referee: Ryan Shepheard

Round 18; Saturday, 21 January 2012	Melbourne Heart (Australia)	1–1	(Australia) Brisbane Roar	Melbourne
19:45 UTC+11	Germano 31'	(Report) (Summary)	Berisha (penalty missed) 38' (pen.); Berisha 69'	Stadium: AAMI Park; Attendance: 7,118; Referee: Chris Beath

Round 19; Saturday, 28 January 2012	Brisbane Roar (Australia)	0–1	(Australia) Newcastle Jets	Brisbane, Queensland
18:45 UTC+10		(Report) (Summary)	Wheelhouse 23'	Stadium: Suncorp Stadium; Attendance: 9,293; Referee: Ben Williams

Round 20; Saturday, 4 February 2012	Central Coast Mariners (Australia)	0–2	(Australia) Brisbane Roar	Gosford, New South Wales
17:30 UTC+11		(Report) (Summary)	Paartalu 5'; Berisha 38'	Stadium: Bluetongue Stadium; Attendance: 10,217; Referee: Kris Griffiths-Jones

Round 21; Sunday, 12 February 2012	Wellington Phoenix (New Zealand)	0–2	(Australia) Brisbane Roar	Wellington, New Zealand
17:00 UTC+13		(Report) (Summary)	Berisha 42'; Nichols 80'	Stadium: Westpac Stadium; Attendance: 13,009; Referee: Jared Gillett

Round 22; Saturday, 18 February 2012	Brisbane Roar (Australia)	3–2	(Australia) Melbourne Victory	Brisbane, Queensland
18:45 UTC+10	Berisha 1' 32'; Henrique 38' (pen.)	(Report) (Summary)	Kewell 9' 50'	Stadium: Suncorp Stadium; Attendance: 18,523; Referee: Jared Gillett

Round 23; Saturday, 25 February 2012	Perth Glory (Australia)	0–3	(Australia) Brisbane Roar	Perth, Western Australia
19:00 UTC+8		(Report) (Summary)	Henrique 21' (red card) 65'; Berisha 59', 63'	Stadium: NIB Stadium; Attendance: 10,367; Referee: Strebre Delovski

Round 24; Friday, 2 March 2012	Brisbane Roar (Australia)	1–1	(Australia) Melbourne Heart	Brisbane, Queensland
19:00 UTC+10	Nichols 33'; Adnan (penalty missed) 90+3' (pen.)	(Report) (Summary)	Good 49'	Stadium: Suncorp Stadium; Attendance: 10,988; Referee: Ryan Shepheard

Round 25; Sunday, 11 March 2012	Brisbane Roar (Australia)	1–1	(Australia) Adelaide United	Brisbane, Queensland
16:00 UTC+10	Berisha 70'	(Report) (Summary)	Ramsay 14'	Stadium: Suncorp Stadium; Attendance: 10,937; Referee: Strebre Dilovski

Round 26; Sunday, 18 March 2012	Newcastle Jets (Australia)	1–2	(Australia) Brisbane Roar	Newcastle, New South Wales
UTC+11	Berisha 12'; Nichols 81' (pen.); Henrique (penalty missed) 53' (pen.)	(Report) (Summary)	Abbas 14'	Stadium: Ausgrid Stadium; Attendance: 11,471; Referee: Jared Gillett

Round 27; Sunday, 25 March 2012	Gold Coast United (Australia)	1–2	(Australia) Brisbane Roar	Gold Coast, Queensland
17:30 UTC+10	Bowles 28'	(Report) (Summary)	Fitzgerald 57'; Lambadaridis 89'	Stadium: Skilled Park; Attendance: 6,102; Referee: Peter Green

==== Finals series ====
Major SF Leg 1 Saturday, 31 March 2011	Brisbane Roar (Australia)	2–0	(Australia) Central Coast Mariners	Brisbane, Queensland
16:30 UTC+10	Henrique 8'; Paartalu 86'; Henrique (penalty missed) 7' (pen.)	(Report) (Summary)		Stadium: Suncorp Stadium; Attendance: 15,081; Referee: Strebre Dilovski

Major SF Leg 2 Sunday, 8 April 2012	Central Coast Mariners (Australia)	2–3	(Australia) Brisbane Roar	Gosford, New South Wales
17:00 UTC+10	Zwaanswijk 29'; Kwasnik 32'	(Report) (Summary)	Broich 2'; Nichols 26'; Henrique 68'	Stadium: Bluetongue Stadium; Attendance: 9,846; Referee: Jared Gillett

Brisbane Roar advance to host the grand final by winning the tie 5–2 on aggregate

Grand final Sunday, 22 April 2012	Brisbane Roar (Australia)	2–1	(Australia) Perth Glory	Brisbane, Queensland
16:00 UTC+10	Berisha 84'; Berisha 90+4' (pen.)	(Report) (Summary)	Franjic 51' (o.g.); Heffernan (yellow card) 56' (yellow-red card) 90'	Stadium: Suncorp Stadium; Attendance: 50,344; Referee: Jared Gillett

=== 2012 Asian Champions League ===
Brisbane qualified for the 2012 AFC Champions League as a result of finishing the 2010–11 A-League season as Champions. They will enter the competition at the group stage along with K-League team Ulsan Hyundai, Beijing Guoan from the Chinese Super League and the winner of the Japanese 2011 Emperor's Cup, FC Tokyo. Due to Asian Football Confederation strict kit regulations, it was necessary for the club to use an alternate kit for the Champions League competition; this was released on 24 February 2012.

Home	Away

The Roar made their debut in the Asian Champions League at Suncorp Stadium against the FC Tokyo on 6 March 2012. A strong performance from the Japanese side, saw the Roar outclassed as they went down 2–0 courtesy of goals to Tatsuya Yazawa and Aria Jasuru Hasegawa. On Matchday 2, a much better performance from the Roar resulted in the club scoring their first ever goal in the competition – through a Mitch Nichols header – and picking up their first competitive point in a 1–1 draw away to Beijing Guoan.

Matchday 1 Tuesday, 6 March 2012	Brisbane Roar (Australia)	0–2	(Japan) FC Tokyo	Brisbane, Queensland
19:30 UTC+10		(Report) (Summary)	Yazawa 45+1'; Hasegawa 55'	Stadium: Suncorp Stadium; Attendance: 12,037; Referee: (Uzbekistan) Kovalenko Valentin

Matchday 2 Tuesday, 20 March 2012	Beijing Guoan (China)	1–1	(Australia) Brisbane Roar	Beijing, China
19:30 UTC+08:00	Cheng 8'	(Report) (Summary)	Nichols 21'	Stadium: Workers Stadium; Attendance: 41,000; Referee: (Qatar) Abdulrahman Mohammed Hussain

Matchday 3 Wednesday, 4 April 2012	Ulsan Hyundai (South Korea)	1–1	(Australia) Brisbane Roar	Ulsan, South Korea
19:30 UTC+09:00	Jae-Seong 54'; Keun-Ho (penalty missed) 48' (pen.)	(Report) (Summary)	Fitzgerald 36'; Jurman (red card) 47'	Stadium: Ulsan Munsu Football Stadium; Attendance: 1,673; Referee: (Lebanon) Andre El Haddad

Matchday 4 Tuesday, 17 April 2012	Brisbane Roar (Australia)	1–2	(South Korea) Ulsan Hyundai	Brisbane, Queensland
19:30 UTC+10	Stefanutto 25'	(Report) (Summary)	Vélez 11'; Tae-Hwi 73' (pen.)	Stadium: Suncorp Stadium; Attendance: 7,015; Referee: (Iran) Mohsen Torky

Matchday 5 Wednesday, 2 May 2012	FC Tokyo (Japan)	4–2	(Australia) Brisbane Roar	Shinjuku, Tokyo, Japan
19:30 UTC+09:00	Takahashi 5'; Mukuhara 20'; Watanabe 44'; Watanabe 60'	[ (Report)] (Summary)	Berisha 4'; Broich 33'	Stadium: National Olympic Stadium; Attendance: 8,492; Referee: (Qatar) Abdullah Balideh

Matchday 6 Wednesday, 16 May 2012	Brisbane Roar (Australia)	1–1	(China) Beijing Guoan	Brisbane, Queensland
19:30 UTC+10	Berisha 15'	Report; Summary	Li Hanbo 34'	Stadium: Suncorp Stadium; Attendance: 5,615; Referee: (United Arab Emirates) Ali Al Badwawi

== Statistics ==
=== Squad statistics ===
Statistics accurate as of 16 May 2012
90 Minutes played is counted as a full game. Injury Time is not counted. A sub's appearance is counted up to the 90th minute as well
A-League Games played: 27
A-League Finals series Games played: 3
ACL Games played: 6

No.	Nat.	Name	League				Finals				Asia				Total			
No.	Nat.	Name	Start	Sub	Mins.	Goal	Start	Sub	Mins.	Goal	Start	Sub	Mins.	Goal	Start	Sub	Mins.	Goal
Goalkeepers
1	(Australia)	Michael Theoklitos	26	–	2340	–	3	–	270	–	6	–	540	–	35	–	3150	–
20	(Australia)	Andrew Redmayne	1	–	90	–	–	–	–	–	–	–	–	–	1	–	90	–
Defenders
2	(Australia)	Matt Smith	24	–	2048	–	3	–	270	–	5	–	450	–	32	–	2768	–
3	(Australia)	Shane Stefanutto	26	–	2250	–	3	–	249	–	5	–	450	1	34	–	2949	1
4	(Australia)	Matthew Jurman	16	2	1287	–	–	1	7	–	2	1	159	–	18	4	1453	–
5	(Australia)	Ivan Franjic	26	–	2325	1	3	–	263	–	6	–	540	–	35	–	3128	1
12	(Australia)	Matt Mundy	–	2	30	–	–	–	–	–	–	–	–	–	–	2	30	–
16	(Bahrain)	Sayed Mohamed Adnan	17	4	1595	1	3	–	270	–	5	–	428	–	25	4	2293	1
19	(Sri Lanka)	Jack Hingert	2	8	358	–	–	1	21	–	–	1	38	–	2	10	417	–
26	(Australia)	Corey Brown	–	–	–	–	–	–	–	–	1	–	90	–	1	–	90	–
29	(Australia)	James Donachie	1	–	90	–	–	–	–	–	–	–	–	–	1	–	90	–
Midfielders
6	(Australia)	Erik Paartalu	27	–	2346	3	3	–	244	1	6	–	531	–	36	–	3121	4
8	(Australia)	Massimo Murdocca	19	7	1719	–	3	–	184	–	5	–	350	–	27	7	2255	–
11	(Canada)	Issey Nakajima-Farran	16	7	1308	4	–	–	–	–	–	–	–	–	16	7	1308	4
14	(Australia)	Rocky Visconte	6	3	566	1	–	–	–	–	1	2	86	–	7	5	652	1
17	(Australia)	Mitch Nichols	20	1	1626	9	3	–	270	1	4	1	356	1	27	2	2252	11
18	(Australia)	Luke Brattan	4	8	479	–	–	3	86	–	1	4	152	–	6	15	717	–
21	(Australia)	James Meyer	2	10	417	1	–	1	17	–	1	4	121	–	3	14	555	1
22	(Germany)	Thomas Broich	16	1	1428	2	3	–	270	1	6	–	540	1	25	1	2238	4
25	(Australia)	George Lambadaridis	–	2	38	1	–	–	–	–	–	–	–	–	–	2	38	1
Forwards
7	(Albania)	Besart Berisha	26	–	2319	19	3	–	270	2	6	–	508	2	35	–	3097	23
9	(Australia)	Kofi Danning	3	9	436	1	–	–	–	–	1	2	126	–	4	11	562	1
10	(Brazil)	Henrique	14	2	1050	6	3	–	225	2	3	–	256	–	20	2	1531	8
24	(Australia)	Nicholas Fitzgerald	7	3	607	1	–	2	54	–	2	1	174	1	9	6	835	2

=== Disciplinary record ===
Correct as of 16 May 2012

#	Nat.	Pos.	Name	League		Finals		Asia		Total	
#	Nat.	Pos.	Name	Yellow card	Red card	Yellow card	Red card	Yellow card	Red card	Yellow card	Red card
2	(Australia)	DF	Matt Smith	6	–	1	–	1	–	8	-
7	(Albania)	FW	Besart Berisha	4	–	–	–	2	–	6	-
16	(Bahrain)	DF	Sayed Mohamed Adnan	3	–	–	–	2	–	5	-
5	(Australia)	DF	Ivan Franjic	3	–	1	–	1	–	5	-
10	(Brazil)	FW	Henrique	2	1	1	–	–	–	3	1
4	(Australia)	DF	Matthew Jurman	3	–	–	–	–	1	3	1
17	(Australia)	MF	Mitch Nichols	3	–	–	–	1	–	4	-
3	(Australia)	DF	Shane Stefanutto	2	–	–	–	1	–	3	-
8	(Australia)	MF	Massimo Murdocca	2	–	–	–	1	–	3	-
1	(Australia)	GK	Michael Theoklitos	2	–	–	–	–	–	2	-
11	(Canada)	MF	Issey Nakajima-Farran	2	–	–	–	–	–	2	-
19	(Sri Lanka)	DF	Jack Hingert	2	–	–	–	–	–	2	-
24	(Australia)	FW	Nicholas Fitzgerald	2	–	–	–	–	–	2	-
18	(Australia)	MF	Luke Bratten	1	–	–	–	1	–	2	-
9	(Australia)	FW	Kofi Danning	1	–	–	–	–	–	1	-
6	(Australia)	MF	Erik Paartalu	1	–	–	–	–	–	1	-
21	(Australia)	MF	James Meyer	1	–	–	–	–	–	1	-
			TOTALS	39	1	3	0	10	1	52	2

=== League Goalscorers by round ===
Total	Player		Goals per Round																													
Total	Player		1	2	3	4	5	6	7	8	9	10	11	12	13	14	15	16	17	18	19	20	21	22	23	24	25	26	27	SF1	SF2	GF
21	(Albania)	Besart Berisha		1	1	4		1		2									1	1		1	1	2	2		1	1				2
10	(Australia)	Mitch Nichols	1		1							1				1	2						1			1		1			1	
8	(Brazil)	Henrique				2	1		1															1	1					1	1	
4	(Canada)	Issey Nakajima-Farran				1				2								1														
4	(Australia)	Erik Paartalu			1												1					1								1		
3	(Germany)	Thomas Broich		1			1																								1	
1	(Australia)	James Meyer							1																							
1	(Australia)	Kofi Danning												1																		
1	(Australia)	Rocky Visconte														1																
1	(Australia)	Ivan Franjic														1																
1	(Bahrain)	Sayed Mohamed Adnan																	1													
1	(Australia)	Nicholas Fitzgerald																											1			
1	(Australia)	George Lambadaridis																											1			
57	TOTAL		1	2	3	7	2	1	2	4	0	1	0	1	0	3	3	1	2	1	0	2	2	3	3	1	1	2	2	2	3	2

A goal was scored from a penalty kick
Two goals were scored from penalty kicks

=== ACL Goalscorers by matchday ===
Total	Player		Goals per Matchday					
Total	Player		1	2	3	4	5	6
2	(Albania)	Besart Berisha					1	1
1	(Australia)	Mitch Nichols		1				
1	(Australia)	Nicholas Fitzgerald			1			
1	(Australia)	Shane Stefanutto				1		
1	(Germany)	Thomas Broich					1	
6	TOTAL		0	1	1	1	2	1

A goal was scored from a penalty kick
Two goals were scored from penalty kicks

== Home attendance ==
Win Draw Loss
League attendance and average includes Finals series

Competition	Round	Date	Score	Opponent	Attendance
A-League	1	8 October 2011	1–0	Central Coast Mariners	13,467
A-League	3	21 October 2011	3–0	Gold Coast United	13,425
A-League	4	28 October 2011	7–1	Adelaide United	11,762
A-League	6	13 November 2011	1–1	Wellington Phoenix	16,428
A-League	8	26 November 2011	4–0	Perth Glory	19,339
A-League	10	9 December 2011	1–2	Melbourne Heart	10,666
A-League	12	17 December 2011	1–2	Central Coast Mariners	10,006
A-League	14	31 December 2011	3–1	Melbourne Victory	14,852
A-League	17	14 January 2012	2–1	Sydney FC	14,545
A-League	19	28 January 2012	0–1	Newcastle Jets	9,293
A-League	22	18 February 2012	3–2	Melbourne Victory	18,523
A-League	24	2 March 2012	1–1	Melbourne Heart	10,988
ACL	Matchday 1	6 March 2012	0–2	FC Tokyo	12,037
A-League	25	11 March 2012	1–1	Adelaide United	10,739
Finals series	Semi-final Leg 1	31 March 2012	2–0	Central Coast Mariners	15,081
ACL	Matchday 4	17 April 2012	1–2	Ulsan Hyundai	7,015
Finals series	Grand final	22 April 2012	2–1	Perth Glory	50,334
ACL	Matchday 6	16 May 2012	1–1	Beijing Guoan	5,615
				League Attendance	239,448
				League Average Attendance	15,963
				Total Attendance	264,115
				Total Average Attendance	14,673

== Ladder ==
Pos	Team	Pld	W	D	L	GF	GA	GD	Pts	Qualification
1	Central Coast Mariners	27	15	6	6	40	24	+16	51	Qualification for 2013 AFC Champions League group stage and finals series (Note: First place qualifies for the 2013 AFC Champions League group stage. Winning the 2012 A-League Grand Final automatically earns qualification for the 2013 AFC Champions League qualifying play-off, unless first place are champions.)
2	Brisbane Roar (C)	27	14	7	6	50	28	+22	49	Qualification for 2013 AFC Champions League qualifying play-off and finals series
3	Perth Glory	27	13	4	10	40	35	+5	43	Qualification for Finals series
4	Wellington Phoenix	27	12	4	11	34	32	+2	40	Qualification for Finals series
5	Sydney FC	27	10	8	9	37	42	−5	38	Qualification for Finals series
6	Melbourne Heart	27	9	10	8	35	34	+1	37	Qualification for Finals series
7	Newcastle Jets	27	10	5	12	38	41	−3	35	
8	Melbourne Victory	27	6	11	10	35	43	−8	29	
9	Adelaide United	27	5	10	12	26	44	−18	25	
10	Gold Coast United	27	4	9	14	30	42	−12	21	

Source: ultimatealeague.com
Rules for classification: 1) points; 2) goal difference; 3) number of goals scored.
(C) Champions

=== 2012 Asian Champions League (Group F) ===
Pos	Team	Pld	W	D	L	GF	GA	GD	Pts	Qualification	ULS	TOK	BBR	BEG
1	(South Korea) Ulsan Hyundai	6	4	2	0	11	7	+4	14	Advance to knockout stage	—	1–0	1–1	2–1
2	(Japan) FC Tokyo	6	3	2	1	12	6	+6	11	Advance to knockout stage	2–2	—	4–2	3–0
3	(Australia) Brisbane Roar	6	0	3	3	6	11	−5	3 (Note: Brisbane Roar and Beijing Guoan are tied on their head-to-head record (2 pts, 0 GD, 2 GF), overall goal difference and overall goals scored, and so are ranked by their fair play record (Brisbane Roar: 12 pts; Beijing Guoan: 18 pts).)		1–2	0–2	—	1–1
4	(China) Beijing Guoan	6	0	3	3	6	11	−5	3		2–3	1–1	1–1	—

Source: WorldFootball.net

== See also ==
- Brisbane Roar FC records and statistics
- List of Brisbane Roar FC players
- Brisbane Roar end of season awards
- 2012 AFC Champions League
- Brisbane Roar website
- A-League website
