= List of Brisbane Roar FC records and statistics =

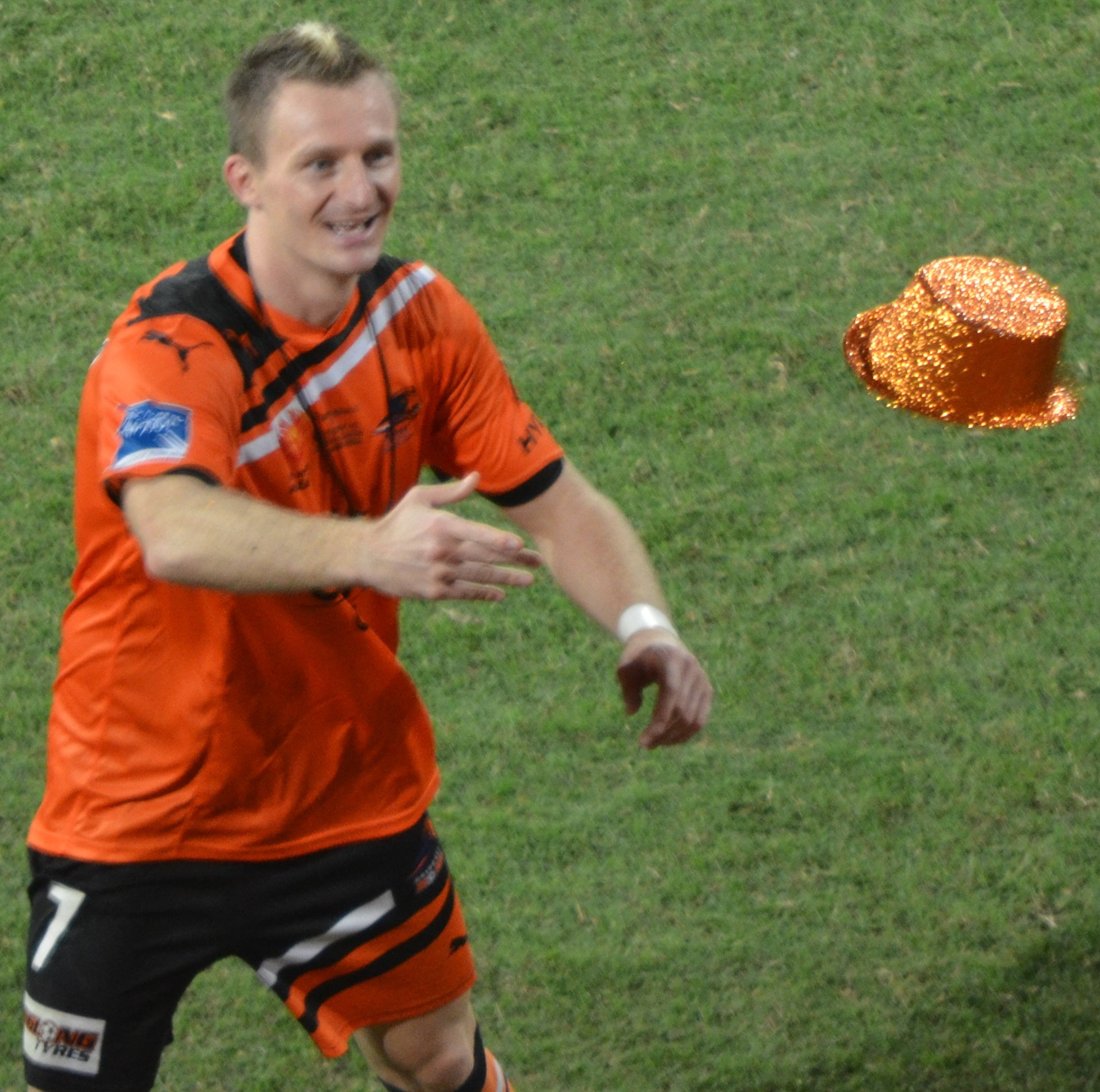
Besart Berisha became Brisbane Roar's record goalscorer in October 2012.

Brisbane Roar Football Club is an Australian professional association football club based in Milton, Brisbane. The club was formed in 2005 as Queensland Roar before breaking off from the Queensland Lions in 2005. Brisbane Roar became the first Queensland member admitted into the A-League Men in 2005.

The list encompasses the honours won by Brisbane Roar at national and friendly level, records set by the club, their managers and their players. The player records section itemises the club's leading goalscorers and those who have made most appearances in first-team competitions. Attendance records at Lang Park, the club's home ground since 2005 and Dolphin Stadium are also included.

Brisbane Roar have won five top-flight titles. The club's record appearance maker is Matt McKay, who made 303 appearances between 2005 and 2019. Besart Berisha is Brisbane Roar's record goalscorer, scoring 50 goals in total.

All figures are correct as of 29 December 2024

== Honours and achievements ==
=== Domestic ===
- A-League Men Premiership

Winners (2): 2010–11, 2013–14
Runners-up (1): 2011–12

- A-League Men Championship

Winners (3): 2011, 2012, 2014

- Australia Cup

Runners-up (1): 2023

=== Friendly titles ===
==== Pre-season ====
- Translink Cup

Winners (2): 2007, 2008
Runners-up (2): 2009, 2010

- Surf City Cup

Winners (1): 2019

== Player records ==
=== Appearances ===
- Most A-League Men appearances: Matt McKay, 272
- Most national cup appearances: Matt McKay, 18
- Most AFC Champions League appearances: Thomas Broich, 18
- Youngest first-team player: Quinn MacNicol, 15 years, 216 days (against Newcastle Jets, Australia Cup, 14 August 2023)
- Oldest first-team player: Massimo Maccarone, 38 years, 226 days (against Melbourne City, A-League Men Finals, 20 April 2018)
- Most consecutive appearances: Erik Paartalu, 85 (from 8 August 2010 to 12 January 2013)

==== Most appearances ====
Competitive matches only, includes appearances as substitute. Numbers in brackets indicate goals scored. Players in bold are currently playing for Brisbane Roar

#	Name	Years	A-League Men		National Cup^{a}	AFC Champions League	Other^{b}	Total
#	Name	Years	Regular season	Finals series	National Cup^{a}	AFC Champions League	Other^{b}	Total
1	(Australia) Matt McKay	2005–2011; 2013–2019	256 (23)	16 (3)	18 (0)	12 (0)	1 (0)	**303** (26)
2	(Sri Lanka) **Jack Hingert**	2011–	268 (4)	8 (0)	18 (0)	15 (0)	0 (0)	**309** (4)
3	(Germany) Thomas Broich	2010–2017	166 (17)	15 (4)	4 (0)	18 (1)	0 (0)	**203** (22)
4	(Australia) Massimo Murdocca	2005–2013	150 (3)	12 (0)	15 (1)	5 (0)	1 (0)	**183** (4)
5	(Brazil) Henrique	2009; 2009–2016; 2018–2019	155 (40)	13 (5)	3 (1)	6 (0)	0 (0)	**177** (46)
6	(Australia) **Corey Brown**	2011–2018; 2020–2022; 2023–	150 (4)	8 (0)	7 (2)	6 (0)	0 (0)	**173** (6)
7	(Australia) Michael Theo	2010–2018	148 (0)	11 (0)	2 (0)	9 (0)	0 (0)	**170** (0)
8	(England) Jamie Young	2014–2021	136 (0)	8 (0)	6 (0)	13 (0)	0 (0)	**163** (0)
9	(Republic of Ireland) **Jay O'Shea**	2019–	137 (26)	2 (0)	14 (3)	0 (0)	0 (0)	**153** (29)
10	(Australia) Ivan Franjic	2009–2014; 2017–2018	121 (12)	10 (1)	0 (0)	8 (0)	0 (0)	**139** (13)

a. Includes the A-League Pre-Season Challenge Cup and Australia Cup
b. Includes goals and appearances (including those as a substitute) in the 2005 Australian Club World Championship Qualifying Tournament.

=== Goalscorers ===
- Most goals in a season: Besart Berisha, 23 goals (in the 2011–12 season)
- Most league goals in a season: Besart Berisha, 21 goals in the A-League, 2011–12)
- Most goals in a match: 4 goals (against Adelaide United, A-League, 28 October 2011)
- Youngest goalscorer: Quinn MacNicol, at 15 years, 228 days (against Sydney United 58, Australia Cup, 26 August 2023)
- Oldest goalscorer: Massimo Maccarone, 38 years, 156 days (against Melbourne Victory, A-League, 9 February 2018)

==== Top goalscorers ====
Competitive matches only, includes appearances as substitute. Numbers in brackets indicate appearances made.

#	Name	Years	A-League Men		National Cup^{a}	AFC Champions League	Other^{b}	Total
#	Name	Years	Regular season	Finals series	National Cup^{a}	AFC Champions League	Other^{b}	Total
1	(Kosovo) Besart Berisha	2011–2014	44 (71)	4 (7)	0 (0)	2 (7)	0 (0)	**50** (83)
2	(Brazil) Henrique	2009; 2009–2016; 2018–2019	40 (156)	5 (12)	1 (3)	0 (6)	0 (0)	**46** (177)
3	(Australia) Jamie Maclaren	2015–2017	37 (49)	3 (4)	0 (2)	3 (6)	0 (0)	**43** (61)
4	(Republic of Ireland) **Jay O'Shea**	2019–	26 (137)	0 (2)	3 (14)	0 (0)	0 (0)	**29** (153)
5	(Indonesia) Sergio van Dijk	2008–2010	24 (47)	1 (3)	2 (3)	0 (0)	0 (0)	**27** (53)
6	(Australia) Matt McKay	2005–2011; 2013–2019	23 (256)	3 (16)	0 (18)	0 (12)	0 (1)	**26** (303)
6	(Brazil) Reinaldo	2005; 2006–2008; 2008–2010	21 (89)	3 (3)	2 (6)	0 (0)	0 (0)	**26** (98)
8	(Australia) Mitch Nichols	2007–2013	21 (113)	3 (12)	0 (7)	1 (6)	0 (0)	**25** (138)
9	(Germany) Thomas Broich	2010–2017	17 (166)	4 (15)	0 (4)	1 (18)	0 (0)	**22** (203)
10	(Australia) Brandon Borrello	2013–2017	13 (71)	0 (4)	0 (3)	7 (13)	0 (0)	**20** (91)

a. Includes the A-League Pre-Season Challenge Cup and Australia Cup
b. Includes goals and appearances (including those as a substitute) in the 2005 Australian Club World Championship Qualifying Tournament.

=== Awards ===
A-League Golden Boot

- (Australia) Alex Brosque – 2005–06
- (Albania) Besart Berisha – 2011–12
- (Australia) Jamie Maclaren – 2016–17

A-League Coach of the Year

- (Australia) Ange Postecoglou – 2010–11
- (England) Mike Mulvey – 2013–14

A-League Goalkeeper of the Year

- (Australia) Michael Theoklitos – 2010–11
- (England) Jamie Young – 2017–18

A-League Young Footballer of the Year

- (Australia) Tommy Oar – 2009–10
- (Australia) Jamie Maclaren – 2015–16
- (Australia) Jamie Maclaren – 2016–17

A-League Goal of the Year

- (Australia) Erik Paartalu – 2010–11
- (France) Éric Bauthéac – 2018–19

Johnny Warren Medal

- (Germany) Thomas Broich – 2011–12
- (Germany) Thomas Broich – 2013–14

Joe Marston Medal

- (Germany) Thomas Broich – 2014

== Managerial records ==
- First full-time head coach: Rado Vidošić managed Brisbane Roar from 1 January 2005 to 30 June 2005.
- Longest-serving head coach: John Aloisi – 3 years, 216 days (26 May 2015 to 28 December 2018)
- Shortest tenure as head coach: Rado Vidošić – 1 day (14 October 2009 to 15 October 2009)
- Highest win percentage: Mike Mulvey, 50.00%
- Lowest win percentage: Ruben Zadkovich, 8.33%

== Club records ==
=== Matches ===
==== Firsts ====
- First A-League Men match: Queensland Roar 2–0 New Zealand Knights, 28 August 2005
- First national cup match: Central Coast Mariners 3–1 Queensland Roar, A-League Pre-Season Challenge Cup, 23 July 2005
- First Australia Cup match: Stirling Lions 0–4 Brisbane Roar, Round of 32, 19 August 2014
- First AFC Champions League match: Brisbane Roar 0–2 FC Tokyo, Group stage, 6 March 2012
- First match at Suncorp Stadium: Queensland Roar 2–0 New Zealand Knights, A-League, 28 August 2005
- First match at Dolphin Stadium: Brisbane Roar 4–3 Melbourne City, A-League, 17 November 2019

==== Record wins ====
- Record A-League Men win: 7–1 against Adelaide United, A-League, 28 October 2011
- Record national cup win: 5–0 against New Zealand Knights, A-League Pre-Season Challenge Cup group stage, 30 July 2005
- Record AFC Champions League win: 6–0 against Global, Second preliminary round, 31 January 2017

==== Record defeats ====
- Record A-League Men defeat: 1–8 against Melbourne City, A-League Men, 28 December 2023
- Record national cup defeat: 1–5 against Melbourne Victory, FFA Cup Round of 32, 9 August 2017
- Record AFC Champions League defeat: 0–6 against Ulsan Hyundai, Group stage, 21 February 2017

==== Record consecutive results ====
Brisbane Roar hold the record for the longest unbeaten sequence in the top flight, with 36.

- Record consecutive wins: 5
  - from 26 January 2011 to 19 February 2011
  - from 13 March 2011 to 28 October 2011
  - from 10 May 2022 to 31 August 2022
  - from 29 April 2023 to 24 September 2023
- Record consecutive defeats: 7, from 26 April 2017 to 22 October 2017
- Record consecutive matches without a defeat: 36, from 18 September 2010 to 26 November 2011
- Record consecutive matches without a win: 15, from 13 April 2024 to 7 January 2025
- Record consecutive matches without conceding a goal: 4
  - from 30 July 2005 to 2 September 2005
  - from 2 November 2007 to 25 November 2007
  - from 8 August 2010 to 5 September 2010
  - from 13 February 2013 to 2 March 2013
- Record consecutive matches without scoring a goal: 4
  - from 5 November 2006 to 24 November 2006
  - from 28 November 2021 to 12 January 2022

=== Goals ===
- Most league goals scored in a season: 58 in 30 matches, 2010–11
- Fewest league goals scored in a season: 25 in 21 matches, 2006–07 and 2007–08
- Most league goals conceded in a season: 71 in 27 matches, 2018–19
- Fewest league goals conceded in a season: 21 in 21 matches, 2007–08

=== Points ===
- Most points in a season: 65 in 30 matches, 2010–11
- Fewest points in a season: 18 in 27 matches, 2018–19

=== Attendances ===
This section applies to attendances at Lang Park, where Brisbane Roar played their home matches since 2005 and Dolphin Stadium, their switch ground from 2020 to 2023.

- Highest attendance at Lang Park: 51,153 against Western Sydney Wanderers, A-League Grand Final, 4 May 2014
- Lowest attendance at Lang Park: 3,245 against Ulsan Hyundai, AFC Champions League group stage, 10 May 2017
- Highest attendance at Dolphin Stadium: 9,387 against Melbourne City, A-League, 17 November 2019
- Lowest attendance at Dolphin Stadium: 1,600 against Wellington Phoenix, A-League Men, 30 March 2022

== See also ==
- Brisbane Roar FC
- A-League Men
- List of Brisbane Roar FC players
- Brisbane Roar end of season awards
- A-League all-time records
