= List of Brisbane Roar FC players =

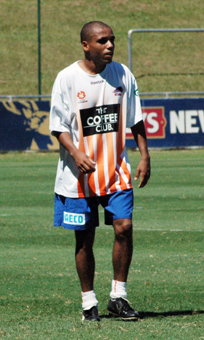
Henrique is Brisbane Roar's second-highest all-time goalscorer.

Brisbane Roar Football Club, an association football club based in Milton, Brisbane, founded in 2005 as Queensland Roar. They became the first Queensland member admitted into the A-League Men in 2005 after a break off with other associated club Queensland Lions. The club's first team have competed in numerous nationally and internationally organised competitions, and all players who have played in 100 or more such matches, either as a member of the starting eleven or as a substitute, are listed below.

Matt McKay holds the record for the greatest number of appearances for Brisbane Roar. Between 2005 and 2019 the Australian midfielder played 303 times for the club. As of 2023, two other players have made more than 200 appearances for Brisbane Roar who are Jack Hingert and Thomas Broich. The club's goalscoring record is held by Besart Berisha, who scored 50 goals in all competitions between 2011 and 2014. He surpassed the previous record of 25 goals in league competition, held by Sergio van Dijk in 2012.

== Key ==
- The list is ordered first by date of debut, and then if necessary in alphabetical order.
- Appearances as a substitute are included.
- Statistics are correct up to and including the match played on 29 December 2024. Where a player left the club permanently after this date, his statistics are updated to his date of leaving.

Positions key
GK	Goalkeeper
DF	Defender
MF	Midfielder
FW	Forward

Nationality
Unless otherwise noted, the nationality of a player is determined by the country/countries which he has played for, or if said person has not played international football, their country of birth.
Position
Playing positions are listed according to the tactical formations that were employed at the time.
Club career
Club career is defined as the first and last calendar years in which the player appeared for the club in any of the competitions listed below.
Total appearances and Total goals
Total appearances and goals comprise those in the A-League Men regular season and finals series, A-League Pre-Season Challenge Cup, Australia Cup, AFC Champions League and the 2005 Australian Club World Championship Qualifying Tournament

== Players ==
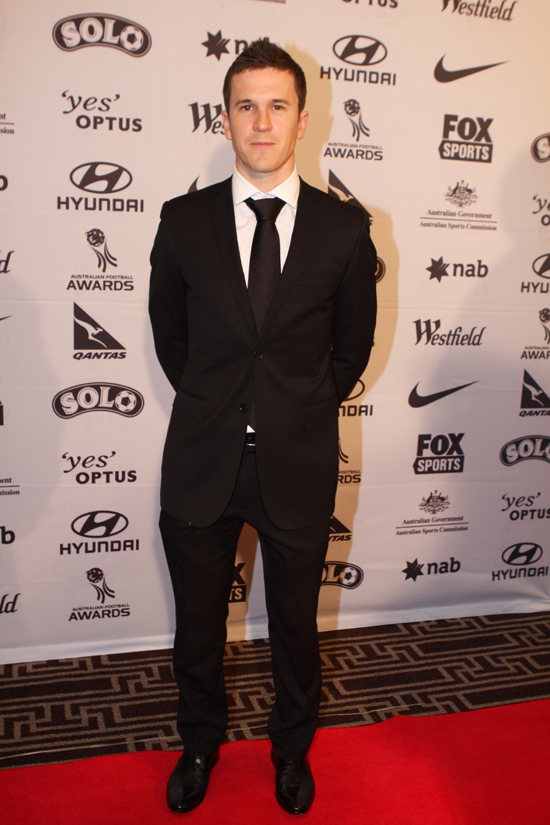
Matt McKay is Brisbane Roar's record appearance-maker with 303 appearances and longest serving captain.

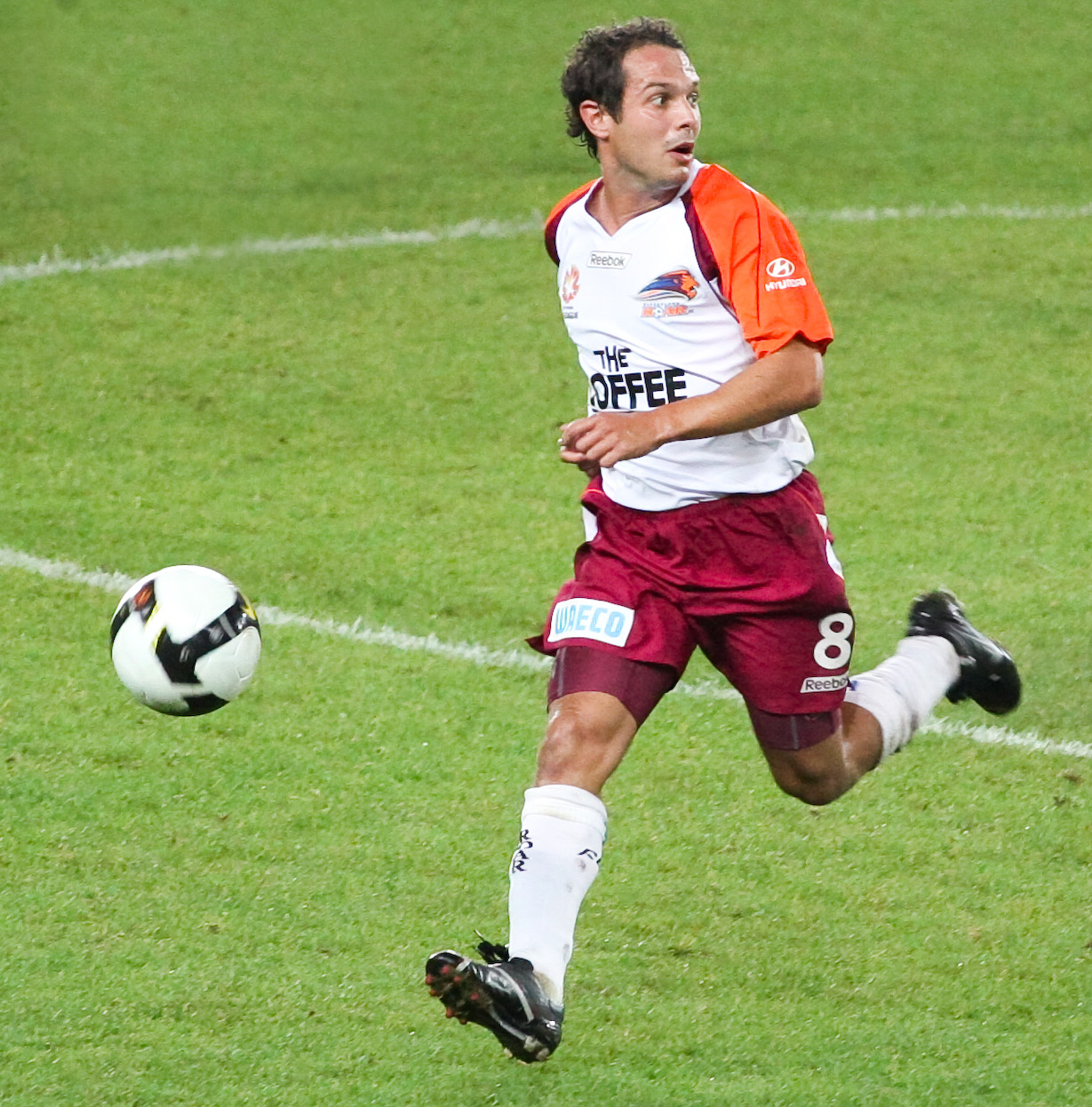
Massimo Murdocca played 183 times for the club from 2005 to 2013.

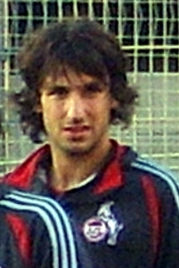
German midfielder Thomas Broich played 203 games, scoring 22 goals for the club.

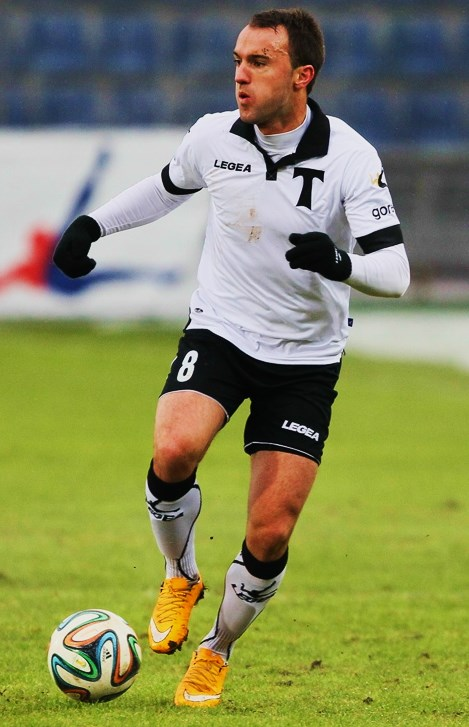
Ivan Franjic made 139 appearances for Brisbane Roar in two stints for the club.

Players highlighted in bold are still actively playing at Brisbane Roar.

List of Brisbane Roar players with 100 or more appearances
Player	Nationality	Pos	Club career	Starts	Subs	Total	Goals
Player	Nationality	Pos	Club career	Appearances			Goals
Sayed Mohammed Adnan	Bahrain	DF	2011-2012	4	20	24	1
Josh McCloughan	Australia	DF	2005–2010	90	10	100	5
Matt McKay	Australia	MF	2005–2019	300	3	303	26
Massimo Murdocca	Australia	MF	2005–2013	148	35	183	4
Mitch Nichols	Australia	MF	2007–2013	91	47	138	25
Luke DeVere	Australia	DF	2008–2019	116	5	121	6
Henrique	Brazil	FW	2009–2016; 2018–2019	105	72	177	46
Ivan Franjic	Australia	DF	2009–2014; 2017–2018	132	7	139	13
Luke Brattan	Australia	MF	2009–2015	79	26	105	4
Thomas Broich	Germany	MF	2010–2017	192	11	203	22
Matt Smith	Australia	DF	2010–2014	118	1	119	6
Shane Stefanutto	Australia	DF	2010–2016	135	3	138	1
Michael Theo	Australia	GK	2010–2018	170	0	170	0
**Jack Hingert**	Sri Lanka	DF	2011–	252	43	295	4
**Corey Brown**	Australia	DF	2011–2018; 2020–	150	23	173	6
Jade North	Australia	DF	2013–2018	127	3	130	4
Dimitri Petratos	Australia	FW	2013–2017	80	22	102	15
Jamie Young	Australia	GK	2014–2021	162	1	163	0
Tom Aldred	Scotland	DF	2019–2024	115	0	115	3
**Scott Neville**	Australia	DF	2019–	106	4	110	4
**Jay O'Shea**	Ireland	MF	2019–	148	4	152	28
Kai Trewin	Australia	DF	2020–2024	100	12	112	1

== Captains ==
Dates	Captain
2005–06	Chad Gibson (AUS)
2006–07	Stuart McLaren (AUS)
2007–09	Chad Gibson (AUS)
2009–11	Matt McKay (AUS)
2011–15	Matt Smith (AUS)
2015–19	Matt McKay (AUS)
2019–	Tom Aldred (SCO)
2024-	Jay O’Shea (IRL)
