= Reggiani =

Reggiani is a surname. Notable people with the surname include:

- Julia Reggiani (born 1970), French swimmer
- Loris Reggiani (born 1959), Italian motorcycle racer
- Luca Reggiani (born 2008), Italian footballer
- Patrizia Reggiani (born 1948), Italian, ex-wife of Maurizio Gucci
- Primo Reggiani (born 1983), Italian actor
- Serge Reggiani (1922–2004), Italian-born French singer and actor
- Thiago Cruz Reggiani (born 1981), Brazilian footballer
