= 2012 A-League Grand Final =

- Event: 2011–12 A-League
Brisbane Roar	Perth Glory
2	1
- Date: 22 April 2012
- Venue: Suncorp Stadium, Brisbane
- Man of the Match: Jacob Burns, Perth Glory
- Referee: Jarred Gillett
- Attendance: 50,334

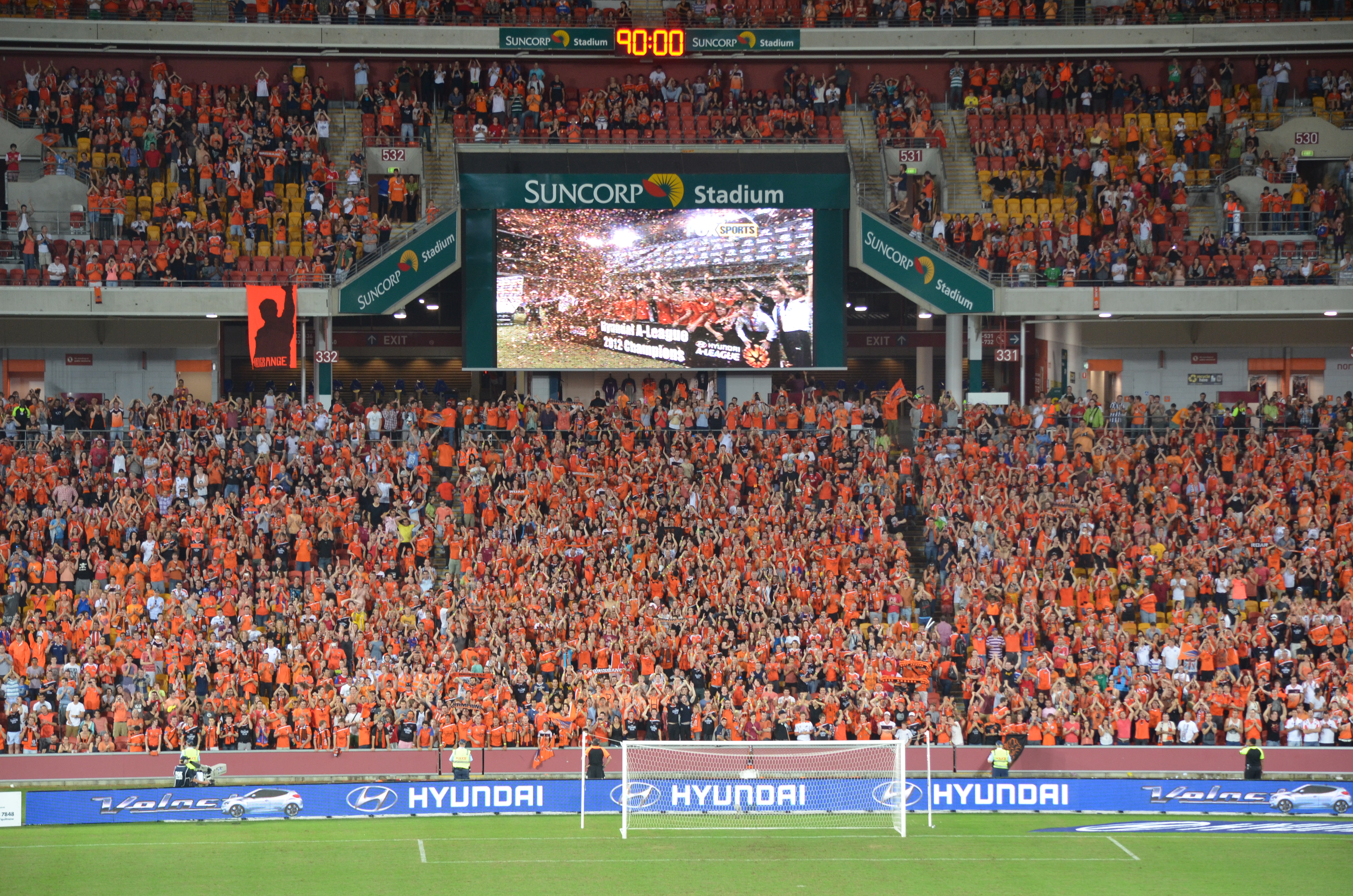
Brisbane Roar fans during the trophy ceremony

The 2012 A-League Grand Final was the seventh A-League Grand Final, which took place on 22 April 2012 at Suncorp Stadium in Brisbane for the second year running. Brisbane Roar played in their second Grand Final in two years, and were aiming to become the first A-League team to win back-to-back Championships. Perth Glory played in their first Grand Final since the 2004 NSL Grand Final, and their first A-League Grand Final. Additionally, it was the second Grand Final since 2006 that did not include the Premiers.

Brisbane Roar won the game, coming from behind after conceding an own goal, through Besart Berisha's two late goals including a controversial penalty in the final minute of injury time after the Glory had been reduced to ten men two minutes earlier. As the Grand Final winner, Brisbane Roar qualified for the 2013 AFC Champions League.

== Route to the final ==
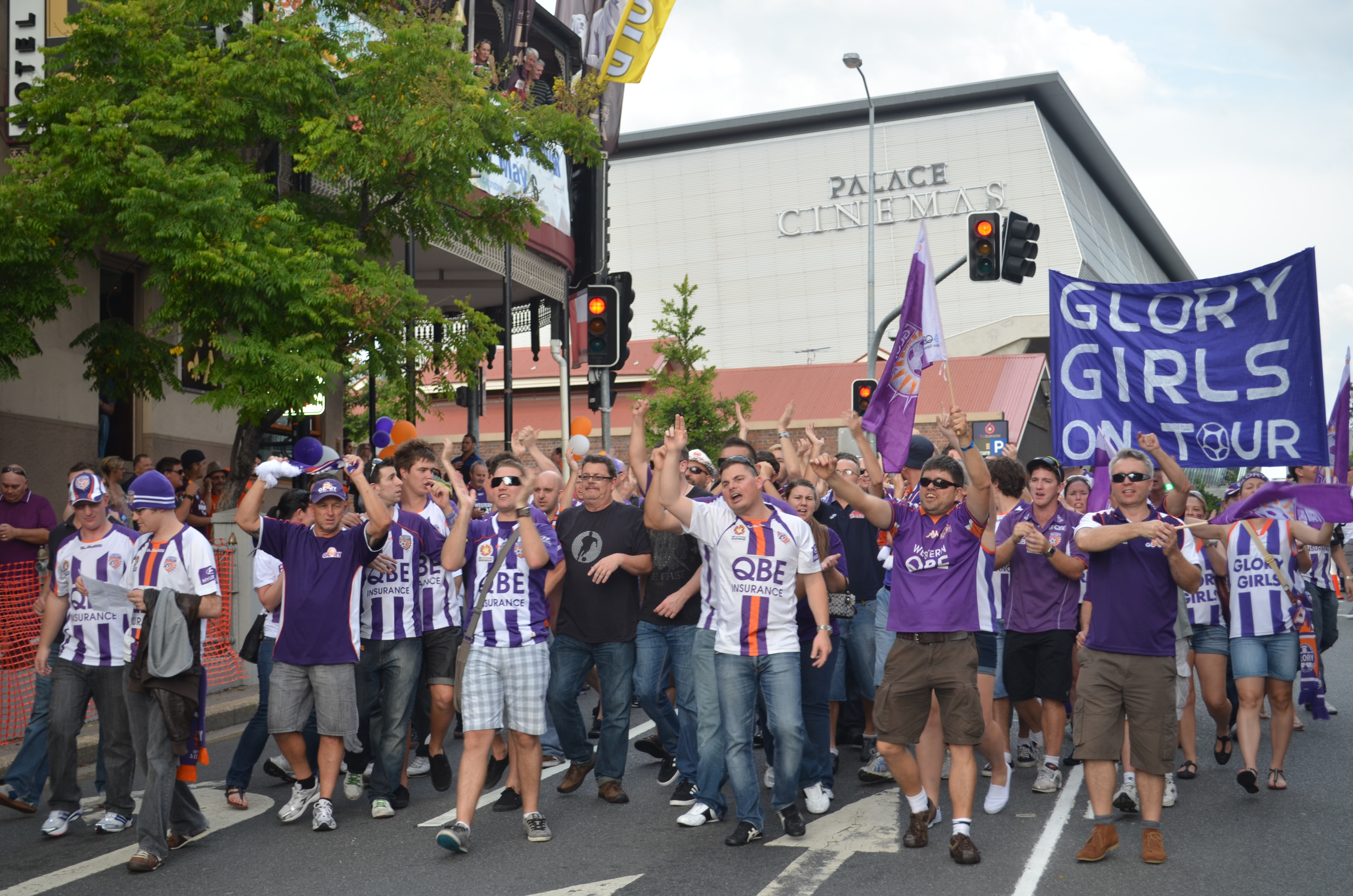
Perth Glory supporters prior to the Grand Final

The Roar went into the 2012 A-League Grand Final as clear favourites, with most pundits expecting an easy victory for the reigning Champions who were hosting the Grand Final for the second consecutive season. The Roar had easily accounted for 2011 runners-up, Central Coast Mariners 5-2 on aggregate in the major semi final, as they had done in the previous season to earn the rights to host the Grand Final at Suncorp Stadium. Perth also qualified for the final by defeating the Mariners; the Glory won the 2012 Premiers in a tense Penalty Shoot-out in the Preliminary Final at Bluetongue Stadium.

Elimination finals
3	Perth Glory	3
6	Melbourne Heart	0
4	Wellington Phoenix	3
5	Sydney FC	2

Semifinals
1	Central Coast Mariners	0	2
2	Brisbane Roar	2	3
Perth Glory	3
Wellington Phoenix	2

Preliminary final
Central Coast Mariners	1 (3)
Perth Glory (pen.)	1 (5)

Grand final
Brisbane Roar	2
Perth Glory	1

== Match ==
=== Summary ===
In front of an official-sellout crowd of 50,334, it would be Brisbane Roar who would become the first A-League team to win back-to-back titles, at the expense of their West coast opponents, in the dying minutes of the game.

The opening half an hour was evenly contested with both sides not really threatening, the best chance for either team fell to Sayed Mohamed Adnan who mistimed a free header over the crossbar from a Thomas Broich corner. Perth suffered a scare after 15 minutes when the A-League's all-time leading goal-scorer, Shane Smeltz suffered a deep laceration to the face following an accidental collision with Roar captain, Matt Smith. The Kiwi striker was treated on the pitch and played on but was substituted, for tactical reasons, in the 80th minute. Smeltz would later be taken to hospital where he would be treated by a plastic-surgeon and receive 50 stitches to repair the damage.

After the opening half an hour, the game started to open up, and with half time approaching, Brisbane had two chances to open the scoring through Mitch Nichols and Thomas Broich. However, the best chance of the half fell to Ivan Franjic, who saw a 20m low-driving effort tipped away by Glory goalkeeper, Danny Vukovic. That save by Vukovic ensured that the teams would go into half-time at 0-0.

The second half started off where the first half had ended. Some trickery from Broich gave himself some space in the Perth box where he forced another superb save from Vukovic. It proved to be a vital save as not 60 seconds later, Perth had the opening goal of the game. Following the save from Vukovic, the ball was played to Billy Mehmet who made a strong run through the midfield where he played the ball out to Travis Dodd who was in space on the left wing. Dodd's initial cross was blocked however, on the second attempt, his low cross was inadvertently deflected into the Michael Theoklitos’ net off the leg of Ivan Franjic for an unfortunate own goal.

Following the goal, Perth changed to a slightly more defensive game plan which also saw attacking options Travis Dodd and Shane Smeltz substituted for defensive players, Scott Neville and Steven McGarry (respectively). Roar manager, Ange Postecoglou also saw need for change bringing off the Roar’s two goal scorer’s from the 2011 Grand Final, Henrique and Erik Paartalu as well as club appearance record holder, Massimo Murdocca for the attack-minded young trio of James Meyer, Luke Brattan and Nicholas Fitzgerald in an attempt to find an equalising goal. However, the Roar were unable to immediately capitalise and Perth were able to keep the Brisbane sides’ attack at bay, at least temporarily.

The breakthrough for the Roar eventually came in the 82nd minute. A throw-in near the corner flag of the Perth half by Shane Stefanutto found Broich in space, who was able to control and send in a cross that Besart Berisha met and fired an unstoppable header into the top left hand corner of Vukovic's goal. The game looked to be heading for extra-time when Dean Heffernan, who had earlier been booked for a needless yellow card in the 58th minute, was given his marching orders in the first minute of injury time after he was given a second yellow card following a scything tackle on Ivan Franjic.

This encouraged Brisbane to push forward and they got the goal that arguably their dominance deserved, albeit through controversial circumstances. Liam Miller was adjudged to have brought down Bersart Berisha in the penalty box and referee Jared Gillett awarded the Roar a penalty. On replay, though Miller did make contact with Berisha's standing foot, many argued for and against that the contact was/was not sufficient to cause Berisha to miss the ball which resulted in the striker falling over. Following the game, Miller admitted there was contact and referee boss Mark Shield backed the referee's decision. However, none of that mattered as Berisha sent Vukovic the wrong way to secure Brisbane Roar their second A-League Championship and into the history books as the first team to win consecutive Championships.

Perth captain, Jacob Burns was awarded the Joe Marston Medal for his man-of-the-match performance in midfield which stifled the Roar's attacking options. Burns’ award was incorrectly awarded to Thomas Broich during the post-match presentation; this was corrected and Burns was presented with his medal some 90 minutes after the presentation at the formal post-match press-conference.

=== Details ===
Sunday, 22 April 2012
16:00 UTC+10

Brisbane Roar	2–1	Perth Glory
Berisha 84, 90+4' (pen.)	Reports	Franjic 51' (o.g.); Heffernan (yellow card) 56' (yellow-red card) 90'

Suncorp Stadium, Brisbane, Queensland
Attendance: 50,334
Referee: Jared Gillett

Brisbane Roar	Perth Glory

GK	1	(Australia) Michael Theoklitos
RB	5	(Australia) Ivan Franjic	(yellow card) 88'
CB	2	(Australia) Matt Smith (c)
CB	16	(Bahrain) Sayed Mohamed Adnan
LB	3	(Australia) Shane Stefanutto
DM	6	(Australia) Erik Paartalu		(substituted off) 64'
CM	17	(Australia) Mitch Nichols
CM	8	(Australia) Massimo Murdocca		(substituted off) 64'
RW	10	(Brazil) Henrique		(substituted off) 73'
LW	22	(Germany) Thomas Broich
ST	7	(Albania) Besart Berisha
Substitutes:
GK	20	(Australia) Andrew Redmayne
DF	4	(Australia) Matthew Jurman
MF	21	(Australia) James Meyer		(substituted on) 73'
MF	18	(Australia) Luke Brattan		(substituted on) 64'
FW	24	(Australia) Nicholas Fitzgerald		(substituted on) 64'
Manager:
(Australia) Ange Postecoglou

GK	1	(Australia) Danny Vukovic	(yellow card) 90'
RB	19	(Australia) Joshua Risdon
CB	5	(Australia) Steve Pantelidis
CB	3	(Netherlands) Bas van den Brink
LB	35	(Australia) Dean Heffernan	(yellow card) 56' (yellow-red card) 90'
RM	13	(Australia) Travis Dodd		(substituted off) 75'
CM	10	(Republic of Ireland) Liam Miller	(yellow card) 7'
CM	7	(Australia) Jacob Burns	(yellow card) 48'
LM	17	(Australia) Todd Howarth
ST	9	(New Zealand) Shane Smeltz		(substituted off) 79'
ST	4	(Republic of Ireland) Billy Mehmet	(yellow card) 90'
Substitutes:
GK	20	(Australia) Neil Young
DF	2	(Australia) Josh Mitchell
DF	12	(Australia) Scott Neville		(substituted on) 75'
MF	14	(Scotland) Steven McGarry		(substituted on) 79'
MF	27	(Brazil) Andrezinho
Manager:
(Scotland) Ian Ferguson

Joe Marston Medal:
Jacob Burns (Perth Glory)

Assistant referees:
Mathew Cheeseman
Matthew Cream
Fourth official:
Ben Williams

Match rules

- 90 minutes
- 30 minutes of extra time if necessary.
- Penalty shoot-out if scores still level.

A-League
2012 Champions

Brisbane Roar
Second Title

=== Statistics ===
Teams	Brisbane Roar	Perth Glory
Possession	62%	38%
Territory (inside own half)	46%	54%
Attack
Shots at Goal	12	2
Shots on Target	6	0
Shots off Target	4	1
Shots - Woodwork	0	0
Corners	7	1
Offsides	3	0
Completed Passes	411	229
Total Crosses	21	12
Defence
Keeper Saves	0	4
Clearances	8	23
Tackles	29	42
Discipline
Fouls Committed	7	18
Yellow Cards	1	6
Red Cards	0	1

== See also ==
- 2011–12 A-League
- List of A-League champions
