= George Lambadaridis =

Australian soccer player

Personal information
- Date of birth: 23 April 1992 (age 34)
- Place of birth: Melbourne, Australia
- Height: 1.86 m (6 ft 1 in)
- Position: Midfielder

Team information
- Current team: Dandenong City

Youth career
- Altona Magic
- 2009–2010: Oakleigh Cannons
- 2010–2011: Club Brugge

Senior career*
| Years | Team | Apps | (Gls) |
| 2009 | Oakleigh Cannons | 1 | (0) |
| 2011–2015 | Brisbane Roar | 9 | (1) |
| 2015 | Brisbane Roar | 1 | (0) |
| 2016–2018 | Green Gully | 63 | (8) |
| 2019–2022 | Bentleigh Greens | 66 | (9) |
| 2023– | Dandenong City | 20 | (0) |

International career^{‡}
| 2011 | Australia U20 | 1 | (0) |
- * Club domestic league appearances and goals as of 21 July 2023 ‡ National team caps and goals as of 17:30, 6 October 2011 (UTC)

George Lambadaridis (born 23 April 1992) is an Australian soccer player who plays as a midfielder for Dandenong City in NPL Victoria 2.

== Club career ==
George Lambadaridis started his career at Altona Magic. With the Magic, he would win his first team championship as the club won the 2008–09 season.

The following year, he would play for fellow Victorian club Oakleigh Cannons.

In 2010, he joined Belgian side Club Brugge, where he would play for the Under 19 team. He then returned to Australia.

Throughout August 2011, he trialed with A-League side Brisbane Roar. On 23 September 2011, he signed a two-year deal with the club as a player on a youth contract. On 4 February 2012, he made his debut for Brisbane Roar in a match against Central Coast Mariners. He scored his first goal away against Gold Coast United - an amazing celebrated goal from long range. In May 2015, Brisbane Roar confirmed that Lambadaridis had been released from his contract at the [A-League club.

He joined Melbourne City on trial in the summer of 2015. During September 2015 he trialed with Brisbane Roar during preseason.

On 23 September 2015, he signed a two-month contract with Brisbane Roar as an injury replacement for Henrique, who was undergoing rehab following knee reconstruction.

On 15 November 2015, Green Gully head coach Arthur Papas announced that Lambadaridis had signed with the club for the 2016 NPL season. Lambadaridis scored on debut for Gully, hitting the opener in a 1–1 draw with Melbourne Knights at Knights Stadium in Round 1 of the NPLV.

== Personal life ==
Lambadaridis is of Greek descent and is married to Kristelle. He attended Brentwood Secondary College and graduated from Monash University with a Bachelor of Business. He also completed a diploma in finance and mortgage brokering.
