= Corey Brown (soccer) =

Australian football player (born 1994)

Personal information
- Full name: Corey Edward Brown
- Date of birth: 7 January 1994 (age 32)
- Place of birth: Brisbane, Queensland, Australia
- Height: 1.74 m (5 ft 9 in)
- Position: Left back

Team information
- Current team: Brisbane City

Youth career
- 2009–2010: QAS
- 2009–2010: Brisbane City
- 2010–2011: AIS

Senior career*
Years	Team	Apps	(Gls)
2011–2018	Brisbane Roar	88	(2)
2018–2020	Melbourne Victory	29	(1)
2020–2022	Brisbane Roar	53	(2)
2023–2025	Brisbane Roar	19	(0)
2025–	Brisbane City	4	(0)

International career^{‡}
2007–2009	Australia U-17	14	(1)
2011–2013	Australia U-20	10	(1)
2014–2016	Australia U-23	8	(0)
- * Club domestic league appearances and goals as of 25 June 2024 ‡ National team caps and goals as of 16 November 2015

Corey Brown (born 7 January 1994) is an Australian soccer player who plays as a left back for Brisbane City. He previously played in the A-League for Brisbane Roar and Melbourne Victory.

He is the son of Rod Brown, who scored for Brisbane Strikers in the 1997 NSL Grand Final and held the record for most NSL goals scored (137 goals) playing throughout the 1980s and 1990s with Marconi, APIA-Leichhardt, Newcastle Breakers and Brisbane Strikers.

== Club career ==
Brown attended a Brisbane all boys school, from grades 5 through to 10; Marist College Ashgrove. In 2009, Brown was awarded a scholarship with the Queensland Academy of Sport at the age of 15. Whilst he was at and played for the QAS, he played on loan for Brisbane City but did not make a senior appearance. In 2010, he was offered a scholarship with the AIS, which he accepted. He made numerous appearances for them in the National Youth League.

On 23 September 2011, it was announced that Brown, who had been on trial for several weeks, had secured a contract with the Brisbane Roar. Brown signed a three-year deal with the club as a player on a full-time youth contract, which allowed him to be on the first team roster but be paid outside of the salary cap.

On 16 May 2012, Brown made his debut at senior level for Brisbane Roar against Chinese side Beijing Guoan in the Champions League, filling in for the injured Shane Stefanutto.

Since then Brown has gone from strength to strength with the Roar, winning the players' player of the season (Gary Wilkins Medal) at the club in the 2016–17 season.

On 27 April 2018, Brisbane Roar confirmed Brown's departure following an approach from Melbourne Victory. Two months later, he officially signed a two-year contract with Melbourne Victory.

On 17 January 2020, Victory released Brown and he rejoined the Brisbane Roar.

=== Return to Brisbane & controversial release ===
After making over 50 appearances on his return to Brisbane, on 18 August 2022 Brisbane Roar released a statement advising the termination of Corey Brown's contract for serious misconduct over alleged drug use. Brown's termination was shrouded in controversy with the Professional Footballers Australia labeling the decision by the club as "bizarre" and "misleading". Brown, who has never failed a drug test vehemently denied the allegations and in response initiated legal proceedings against the club. Brown returned to the club ahead of the 2023-24 season under new manager Ross Aloisi.

== Career statistics ==
As of 19 August 2022

Club	Season	League			Cup		Continental		Total	
Club	Season	Division	Apps	Goals	Apps	Goals	Apps	Goals	Apps	Goals
Brisbane Roar	2011–12	A-League	0	0	0	0	1	0	1	0
Brisbane Roar	2012–13	A-League	4	0	0	0	0	0	4	0
Brisbane Roar	2013–14	A-League	15	0	0	0	0	0	15	0
Brisbane Roar	2014–15	A-League	17	0	2	1	3	0	22	1
Brisbane Roar	2015–16	A-League	15	1	0	0	0	0	15	1
Brisbane Roar	2016–17	A-League	25	1	1	0	4	0	30	1
Brisbane Roar	2017–18	A-League	12	0	1	0	0	0	13	0
Brisbane Roar	Total		88	2	4	1	8	0	100	3
Melbourne Victory	2018–19	A-League	23	1	2	0	5	0	30	1
Melbourne Victory	2019–20	A-League	6	0	1	0	0	0	7	0
Melbourne Victory	Total		29	1	3	0	5	0	37	1
Brisbane Roar	2019–20	A-League	10	1	0	0	0	0	10	1
Brisbane Roar	2020–21	A-League	26	0	0	0	0	0	26	0
Brisbane Roar	2021–22	A-League	12	1	2	1	0	0	14	2
Brisbane Roar	Total		48	2	2	1	0	0	50	3
Career total			165	5	9	2	13	0	187	7
