= Rado Vidošić =

Croatian football manager (1961–2026)

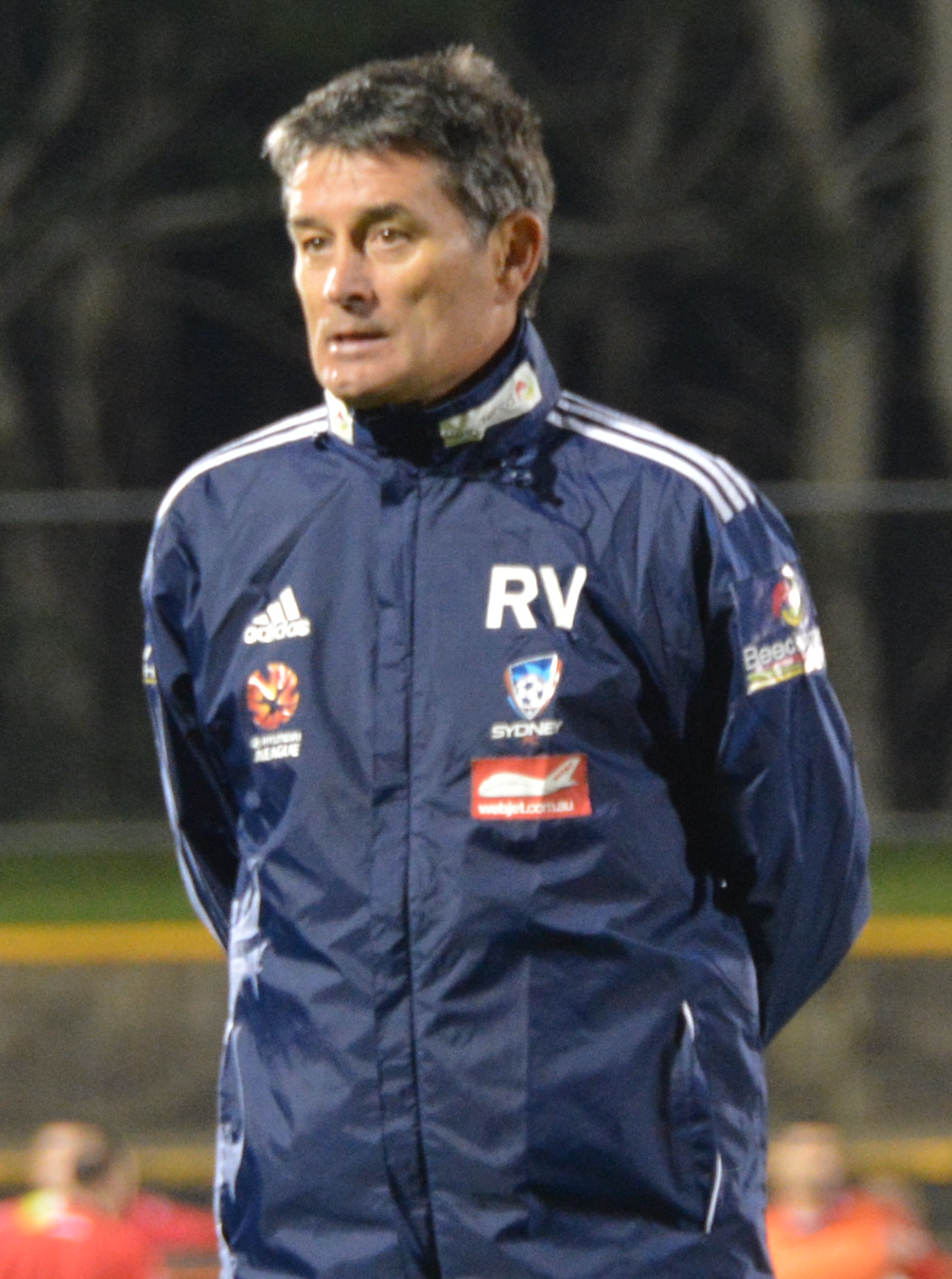
- Vidošić with Sydney FC in 2014

Personal information
- Date of birth: 4 April 1961
- Place of birth: Osijek, PR Croatia, FPR Yugoslavia
- Date of death: 27 January 2026 (aged 64)
- Place of death: Queensland, Australia

Managerial career
- Years: Team
- 2005: Queensland Lions
- 2006–2009: Brisbane Roar (assistant)
- 2008–2010: Brisbane Roar Youth
- 2009: Brisbane Roar (caretaker)
- 2009–2012: Brisbane Roar (assistant)
- 2012: Brisbane Roar
- 2012–2013: Brisbane Roar (technical director)
- 2013–2014: Sydney FC (assistant)
- 2014–2015: Brisbane Roar (assistant)
- 2015–2016: Melbourne Victory (assistant)
- 2017: Wellington Phoenix (assistant)
- 2018–2022: Melbourne City Women
- 2022–2023: Melbourne City
- 2025–2026: Brighton & Hove Albion Women (women’s and girls’ head of coaching)

Rado Vidošić (4 April 1961 – 27 January 2026) was a Croatian-Australian association football manager who was most known for his extended career in both the A-League Men's and Women's leagues, consisting of both head coaching and assistant roles at Brisbane Roar, Melbourne City Men, Melbourne City Women, Melbourne Victory, Sydney FC and Wellington Phoenix respectively. His final role was as women's and girl's head of coaching with Brighton & Hove Albion Women.

== Managerial career ==
=== Brisbane Roar ===
Vidošić had served as the assistant coach of Brisbane Roar since their inaugural A-League season. He served as the club's caretaker manager from 10 October 2009 to 15 October 2009 after manager Frank Farina was sacked due to drink-driving charges. He was succeeded by former Australia U-20 team manager Ange Postecoglou. On 25 April 2012, he was named as the new manager of Brisbane, following the departure of Ange Postecoglou, who left to manage his hometown club Melbourne Victory.

On 18 December 2012, just 11 games into the season, after a poor run of results in the 2012–13 season and with the Roar sitting 9th out of 10 teams on the ladder, Vidošić was reassigned to the role of technical director and was replaced by Melbourne Victory W-League manager Mike Mulvey as interim coach until May 2013.

=== Sydney FC ===
In June 2013, Sydney FC signed Vidošić as Assistant Coach. working alongside Frank Farina once again.

=== Return to Brisbane Roar ===
In December 2014, Sydney FC announced that Vidošić had returned to Brisbane for personal reasons. Despite being a former head coach and technical director, he subsequently took the unusual step of taking up an assistant coaching role with his former club Brisbane Roar.

=== Melbourne Victory ===
On 13 July 2015, Vidošić joined Melbourne Victory as an assistant coach, following the resignation of Jean-Paul de Marigny. On 31 May 2016, after one season at the club, Vidošić left his role as the result of the return of former assistant coach de Marigny.

=== Wellington Phoenix ===
On 7 June 2017, Vidošić was announced as the assistant coach of Wellington Phoenix working alongside Darije Kalezić who was announced as the new head coach. On 20 December 2017, Vidošić left the club together with his son Dario.

=== Melbourne City ===
In July 2018, Vidosic joined Melbourne City as the club's technical director and head coach of the W-League team.

On 23 November 2022, after Patrick Kisnorbo was announced as manager of French top division side, and fellow City Football Group club, Troyes, Vidosic was appointed caretaker manager of Melbourne City. In February 2023, Vidosic was appointed Men's head coach on a permanent basis.

After a 6–0 loss to Adelaide United, Rado and Melbourne City announced they had parted ways, on 1 November 2023.

=== Brighton and Hove Albion ===
In January 2025 Vidošić was appointed Head of Women's and Girl's Coaching at Women's Super League Club Brighton and Hove Albion where his son Dario is head coach of the women's team.

== Personal life and death ==
At the time of death his son, Dario Vidošić was the Brighton & Hove Albion W.F.C. manager. On 4 November 2012, Vidošić managed the Brisbane Roar against Dario's Adelaide United at Suncorp Stadium, with Dario's goal in the 3rd minute of the match securing victory for Adelaide United over his father's team.

Rado Vidošić died from cancer in Queensland, Australia on 27 January 2026, at the age of 64.

== Managerial statistics ==
As of 12 May 2023

Team	Nat	From	To	Record				
Team	Nat	From	To	G	W	D	L	Win %
Brisbane Roar Youth	(Australia)	26 September 2008	27 February 2010	42	15	8	19	35.71
Brisbane Roar (caretaker)	(Australia)	10 October 2009	15 October 2009	1	0	0	1	0.00
Brisbane Roar	(Australia)	25 April 2012	18 December 2012	13	3	3	7	23.08
Melbourne City	(Australia)	23 November 2022	1 November 2023	20	11	6	3	55.00
Total				76	29	17	30	38.16

== Honours ==
=== Assistant manager ===
Brisbane Roar

- A-League Men Championship
  - Winners (2): 2011, 2012
- A-League Men Premiership
  - Winners (2): 2010–11, 2013–14
  - Runners Up (1): 2011–12

Melbourne Victory

- Australia Cup
  - Winners (1): 2015

=== Manager ===
Melbourne City

- A-League Men Championship
  - Runners Up (1): 2023
- A-League Men Premiership
  - Winners (1): 2022–23

Melbourne City Women

- A-League Women Championship
  - Winners (1): 2020
- A-League Women Premiership:
  - Winners (1): 2019–20
  - Runners Up (1): 2021–22
