= Thiago Cruz =

Brazilian footballer

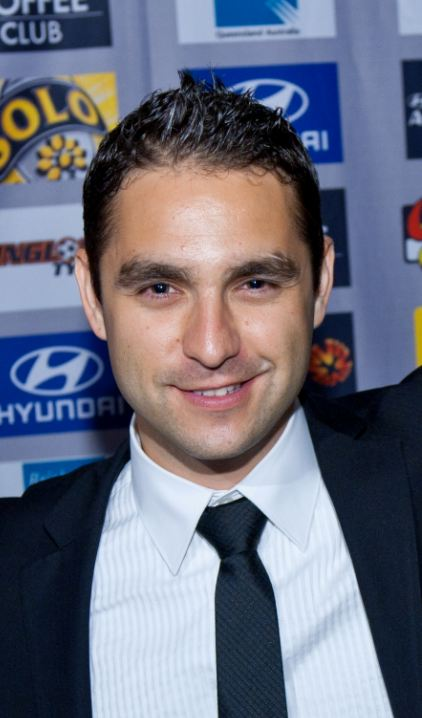
- Thiago Cruz during Brisbane Roar 2011 Awards Night

Personal information
- Full name: Thiago Cruz Reggiani
- Date of birth: 15 July 1981 (age 45)
- Place of birth: São Paulo, Brazil
- Height: 1.80 m (5 ft 11 in)
- Position: Striker

Youth career
- 1998: São Paulo FC
- 1999: Boca Juniors
- 2000: Gimnasia La Plata

Senior career*
Years	Team	Apps	(Gls)
2000	All Boys		

Managerial career
- 2007–2011: Brisbane Roar (Director of Football)
- 2012–2015: Ituano Futebol Clube (Director of Football)
- 2016–: Middlesbrough (Head of Academy Recruitment)
- * Club domestic league appearances and goals

Thiago Cruz Reggiani (born 15 July 1981) is a football former striker.

He was the director of football of Australian club Brisbane Roar during the 2010–11 A-League season when the club won its first ever Premiership and Championship after a season which saw them go undefeated in 28 games, including the Grand Final. With that feat, they won automatic entry into the 2012 AFC Champions League.

At the beginning of the 2012, Thiago Cruz returned to Brazil and took over the position of Director of Football of Brazilian football club Ituano, owned by former Brazilian international Juninho Paulista. In 2014, Ituano won the Campeonato Paulista, defeating Santos Futebol Clube on penalty kicks.

In May 2016, Thiago Cruz took a position as Head of Academy Recruitment Operations for English club Middlesbrough.
