= Shane Stefanutto =

Australian soccer player

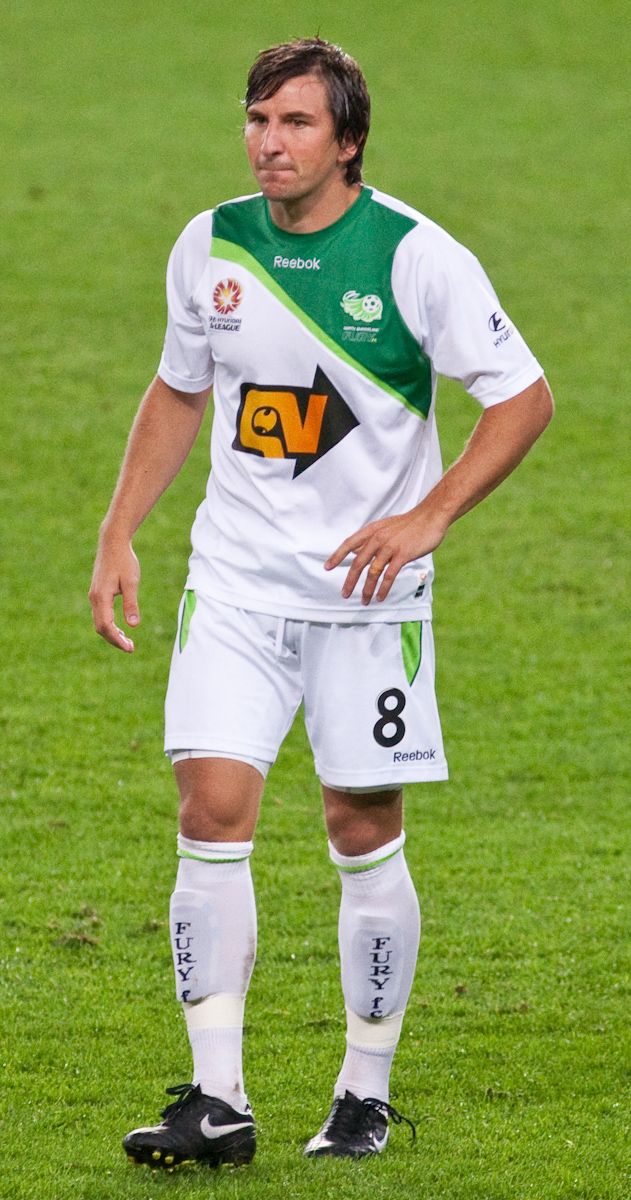
- Stefanutto playing for North Queensland Fury in 2009

Personal information
- Full name: Shane Peter Stefanutto
- Date of birth: 12 January 1980 (age 46)
- Place of birth: Cairns, Queensland, Australia
- Height: 1.77 m (5 ft 10 in)
- Position: Left back

Team information
- Current team: Brisbane Roar (Technical Director)

Youth career
- Edge Hill United FC
- 1997–1998: QAS

Senior career*
| Years | Team | Apps | (Gls) |
| 1998–2004 | Brisbane Strikers | 124 | (1) |
| 2004–2007 | Lillestrøm | 78 | (1) |
| 2008–2009 | Lyn | 43 | (0) |
| 2009–2010 | North Queensland Fury | 7 | (0) |
| 2010–2016 | Brisbane Roar | 134 | (0) |
| 2016–2018 | Olympic FC | 47 | (0) |

International career
| 2007–2009 | Australia | 3 | (0) |

Managerial career
- 2019–: Brisbane Roar (Technical Director)
- * Club domestic league appearances and goals as of 13 September 2018

Shane Stefanutto (born 12 January 1980) is an Australian former professional soccer player who is the Technical Director of Brisbane Roar. He previously played for Brisbane Strikers, Lillestrøm, Lyn, North Queensland Fury, Brisbane Roar, Olympic FC and Australian national team.

== Club career ==
Stefanutto trained at the Queensland Academy of Sport before playing for the Brisbane Strikers in the defunct National Soccer League from 1998 to 2004, before transferring Lillestrøm in Norway. On 26 August 2007, Stefanutto scored his first goal for LSK in his 112th match, against Aalesund. The goal came from a long-range free kick. His contract with Lillestrøm expired at the end of the 2007 season, and he played for Lyn Oslo in the 2008 season, before signing for North Queensland Fury on 5 August 2009.

He sustained a potentially season-ending knee injury in a match against Perth Glory after an innocuous challenge with Adriano Pellegrino, which was presumed to be a ruptured anterior cruciate ligament. The injury hindered his World Cup 2010 selection hopes. On 13 April 2010, Stefanutto signed a contract with the Brisbane Roar, which would see him play there for the next three seasons.

Shane announced his retirement from professional football on 30 April 2016 at the end of the 2015–16 A-League season.

In June 2016, he signed with National Premier Leagues Queensland side Olympic FC.

== International career ==
On 2 November 2006 he received his first call-up to the Australian national team for an international friendly against Ghana, in London but did not play. On 24 March 2007 Stefanutto won his first international cap in a friendly match against China. He remained out of the team for more than two years before receiving a recall in Australia's final qualification match for the 2010 World Cup against Japan in June 2009.

== Personal life ==
Stefanutto is also an Italian citizen, and his family originates from the town of Latisana, near the city of Udine, in the region of Friuli-Venezia Giulia. He is married to Tammy Woolf and they have two children, Stella and Max. Following his professional retirement in 2016, Stefanutto transitioned into Brisbane Roar's administration staff, re-joining the club as their Media & Communications Officer.

== A-League statistics ==
As of 30 April 2016

| Club | Season | League^{1} | | Cup | | International^{2} | | Total | |
| Club | Season | Apps | Goals | Apps | Goals | Apps | Goals | Apps | Goals |
|---|---|---|---|---|---|---|---|---|---|
| North Queensland Fury | 2009–10 | 7 | 0 | – | – | 0 | 0 | 7 | 0 |
| North Queensland Fury | Total | 7 | 0 | – | – | 0 | 0 | 7 | 0 |
| Brisbane Roar | 2010–11 | 23 | 0 | – | – | 0 | 0 | 23 | 0 |
| Brisbane Roar | 2011–12 | 29 | 0 | – | – | 5 | 1 | 34 | 1 |
| Brisbane Roar | 2012–13 | 28 | 0 | – | – | 1 | 0 | 29 | 0 |
| Brisbane Roar | 2013–14 | 18 | 0 | – | – | – | – | 18 | 0 |
| Brisbane Roar | 2014–15 | 13 | 0 | 0 | 0 | 3 | 0 | 16 | 0 |
| Brisbane Roar | 2015–16 | 16 | 0 | 1 | 0 | - | - | 17 | 0 |
| Brisbane Roar | Total | 134 | 0 | 1 | 0 | 9 | 1 | 144 | 0 |
| Career Total | | 141 | 0 | 1 | 0 | 9 | 1 | 151 | 1 |

^{1} - includes A-League final series statistics
^{2} - includes FIFA Club World Cup statistics; AFC Champions League statistics are included in season commencing after group stages (i.e. ACL and A-League seasons etc.)

== Honours ==
=== Club ===
Lillestrøm:

- Norwegian Cup: 2007

Brisbane Roar:

- A-League Premiership: 2010–11, 2013–14
- A-League Championship: 2010–11, 2011–12, 2013–14
