= Mitch Nichols =

Australian soccer player (born 1989)

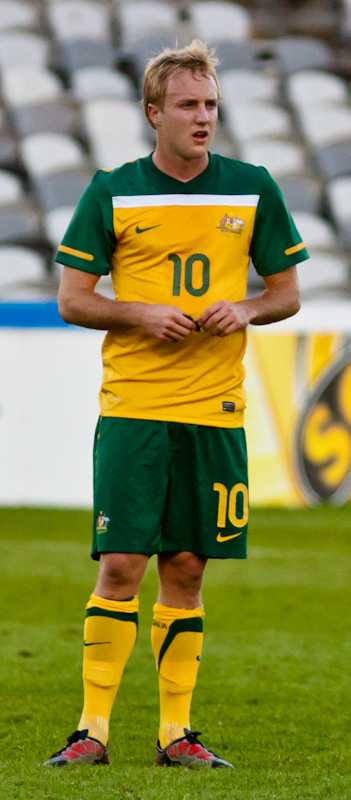
- Nichols playing for the Australian Under 23 team

Personal information
- Full name: Mitchell Ian Nichols
- Date of birth: 1 May 1989 (age 37)
- Place of birth: Southport, Queensland, Australia
- Height: 1.81 m (5 ft 11 1/2 in)
- Position: Midfielder

Team information
- Current team: Gold Coast United FC

Youth career
- 1994–2006: Palm Beach

Senior career*
Years	Team	Apps	(Gls)
2007	Palm Beach	8	(9)
2007–2013	Brisbane Roar	125	(24)
2013–2014	Melbourne Victory	14	(3)
2014–2015	Cerezo Osaka	6	(0)
2014–2015	→ Perth Glory (loan)	14	(0)
2015–2017	Western Sydney Wanderers	53	(11)
2017–2018	Perth Glory	13	(1)
2018–2019	Wellington Phoenix	7	(0)
2019–2022	Gold Coast Knights	77	(18)
2022–2023	Olympic FC	8	(3)

International career^{‡}
2007–2009	Australia U-20	22	(11)
2010–2012	Australia U-23	5	(2)
2009–2014	Australia	5	(0)

Managerial career
- 2023–: Brisbane Roar Academy (Assistant coach)
- * Club domestic league appearances and goals as of 21 September 2022 ‡ National team caps and goals as of 2 December 2020

Mitchell Ian Nichols (born 1 May 1989) is an Australian professional footballer who last played as a midfielder for Olympic FC in the National Premier Leagues Queensland. He is currently the Assistant coach of the Brisbane Roar Academy in the NPL Queensland.

== Club career ==
=== Brisbane Roar ===
He signed a two-year deal on 11 May 2007 with the Roar after impressing in the opening rounds of the Gold Coast Premier League with Palm Beach Sharks, leading the goal scoring charts from midfield after 7 matches. Roar manager Frank Farina stated that Nichols was "one for the future" the official press conference following his signing.

Nichols made a solid start to his career in the A-League with a number of substitute appearances. He also received his first call-up to the Australian Under 20 squad for a training camp on 7 October 2007. He scored his first goal for the Roar in his side's 4–1 victory over Perth Glory midway through the 2008–09 season. In the 2011–12 season, the midfielder exceeded expectations pre-season, scoring 10 goals, mostly from long range. He also made the A-league Team of the Season, alongside teammates Thomas Broich and Besart Berisha.

=== Melbourne Victory ===
Before he joined Melbourne Victory he went on trial at Danish club Randers. On 13 May 2013, it was announced by Melbourne Victory that Nichols had signed a two-year deal with the club, reuniting him with his former Roar manager Ange Postecoglou. He became Postecoglou's first new signing ahead of the 2013/14 Hyundai A-League season.

=== Cerezo Osaka ===
Japanese J1 League Club Cerezo Osaka made multiple bids for Nichols during the January 2014 transfer window, the highest of which reaching $400,000. Melbourne Victory stood firm despite Nichols' interest in the offer, however look set to complete the deal in the hope of acquiring young Australian midfielder, Tom Rogic.

In the end following Nichols' interest in moving and Tom Rogic joining Melbourne Victory, Nichols joined Cerezo Osaka. Nichols made his debut for Cerezo on 11 March 2014, coming off the bench in an AFC Champions League match against Shandong Luneng Taishan, which Cerezo lost 1–3.

==== Loan to Perth Glory ====
On 23 June 2014, Nichols joined Perth Glory on a one-year loan.

=== Western Sydney Wanderers ===
On 3 July 2015, Nichols signed a two-year deal with A-League side Western Sydney Wanderers. Nichols made his Wanderers debut against Brisbane Roar on 8 October 2015, scoring his debut goal for the club in the 13th minute of Wanderers' 3–1 defeat. On 11 May 2017, it was announced that Wanderers would not be renewing Nichols' contract.

Despite Nichols admitting to drug possession, on 13 June 2017, Perth Glory signed him on a two-year deal. On 20 February 2018, Nichols and Perth Glory mutually terminated his contract due to family reasons.

=== Wellington Phoenix ===
On 23 July 2018, it was announced that Nichols had signed a two-year deal with Wellington Phoenix to stay in the A-league.

On 15 January 2019, it was announced that Nichols and the Phoenix had parted ways.

=== Gold Coast Knights ===
On 15 March 2019, Nichols signed for National Premier Leagues Queensland side Gold Coast Knights.

=== Olympic FC ===
On 23 June 2022, Nichols signed for National Premier Leagues Queensland side Olympic FC.

=== Gold Coast United FC ===
On 9 January 2023, it was announced that Nichols signed for National Premier Leagues Queensland side Gold Coast United FC.

== International career ==
Nichols represented the Australia U-20 team during the AFC U-19 Championship in Saudi Arabia. He scored two goals in the Quarter Final match against North Korea including a spectacular overhead kick in extra time. Nichols represented the Australia U-23 team receiving his first cap in 2010. Nichols made his first senior international debut for the Socceroos on 4 March 2009 in an AFC Asian Cup qualifying match versus Kuwait.

== Career statistics ==
As of match played 15 January 2019

Club	Season	Division	League^{1}		Cup		Asia^{2}		Total	
Club	Season	Division	Apps	Goals	Apps	Goals	Apps	Goals	Apps	Goals
Palm Beach	2007	Queensland Premier League	8	9	—		—		8	9
Brisbane Roar	2007–08	A-League	10	0	—		—		12	0
Brisbane Roar	2008–09	A-League	13	5	—		—		17	6
Brisbane Roar	2009–10	A-League	20	1	—		—		20	1
Brisbane Roar	2010–11	A-League	32	6	—		—		32	6
Brisbane Roar	2011–12	A-League	24	10	—		5	1	29	11
Brisbane Roar	2012–13	A-League	26	2	—		1	0	27	2
Brisbane Roar	Total		125	24	—		6	1	131	25
Melbourne Victory	2013–14	A-League	14	3	—		—		14	3
Cerezo Osaka	2014	J1 League	6	0	0	0	4	0	10	0
Perth Glory	2014–15	A-League	14	0	3	0	—		17	0
Western Sydney Wanderers	2015–16	A-League	29	10	3	0	—		32	10
Western Sydney Wanderers	2016–17	A-League	24	1	3	1	4	1	31	3
Western Sydney Wanderers	Total		53	11	6	1	4	1	63	13
Perth Glory	2017–18	A-League	13	1	0	0	—		13	1
Wellington Phoenix	2018–19	A-League	7	0	1	0	—		8	0
Career total			240	48	10	1	14	2	264	51

^{1} – includes A-League final series statistics
^{2} – includes FIFA Club World Cup statistics; AFC Champions League statistics are included in season commencing after group stages (i.e. ACL and A-League seasons etc.)

== Honours ==
=== Club ===
Brisbane Roar:

- A-League Premiership: 2010–2011
- A-League Championship: 2010–2011, 2011–12

Gold Coast Knights

- NPL Queensland Championship: 2019

=== Country ===
Australia:

- AFF U19 Youth Championship: 2008

=== Individual ===
- PFA Team of the Season: 2011–12, 2015–16
