= Sayed Mohamed Adnan =

Bahraini footballer

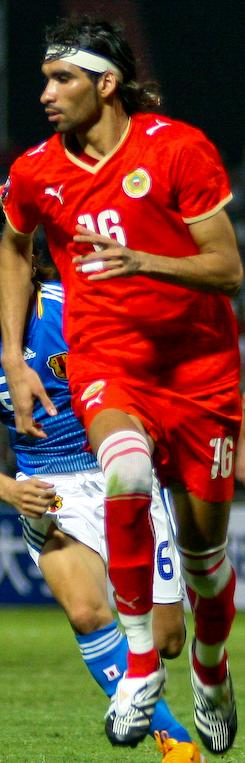
- Sayed Mohamed Adnan in 2008

Personal information
- Full name: Sayed Mohamed Adnan Mahfoodh Mohamed
- Date of birth: 5 February 1983 (age 43)
- Place of birth: Malé, Maldives
- Height: 1.89 m (6 ft 2 in)
- Position: Defender

Team information
- Current team: Malkiya

Senior career*
Years	Team	Apps	(Gls)
2003–2005	Malkiya	35	(3)
2005–2011	Al-Khor	149	(33)
2011–2012	Brisbane Roar	24	(1)
2012–2013	Al-Arabi (Kuwait)	35	(7)
2013–2014	Al-Arabi (Qatar)	12	(2)
2014–2016	Al Hidd		
2016–2017	→ Al Ahli (loan)		
2017–2018	Al Manama		
2018–2022	Al Hidd		
2022–2026	Malkiya		

International career^{‡}
2004–2016	Bahrain	97	(11)
2023	Bahrain Olympic	3	(0)
- * Club domestic league appearances and goals as of 3 June 2013 ‡ National team caps and goals as of 27 September 2023

Sayed Mohamed Adnan (Arabic: سيد محمد عدنان; born 5 February 1983) is a Bahraini footballer who once played for the national team, and currently playing for Malkiya.

== Club career ==
=== Brisbane Roar, Australia ===
On 17 July 2011, it was reported in the Australian media that Adnan was on trial with 2010–11 A-League Champions Brisbane Roar. On 16 August 2011, he signed a one-year contract with the club. Adnan scored his first goal for Brisbane from a free-kick against Sydney FC. On 9 July 2012, it was announced that Adnan would not be extending his contract with Brisbane and that he would return home to his family in Bahrain.

=== Al Arabi Kuwait ===
On 28 July 2012, it was reported on the Al Arabi Sporting Club website that Adnan signed a one-year deal worth US$500,000 to play for the Kuwaiti Premier League side.

=== Al Arabi Qatar ===
On 28 May 2013, he signed a deal with the Qatar Stars League side Al-Arabi.

=== Al-Hidd Bahrain ===
In 2014–2016, he played for top flight Al-Hidd Sports and Cultural Club in Bahrain.

=== Al Ahli Dohar ===
He played for Al Ahli in 2016–2017.

== International career ==
He was a member of the Bahrain national football team starting from 2004. In 2009, he was nominated for the Asian Player of The Year award.

In the final round of the 2010 World Cup Qualifications he missed a crucial penalty against New Zealand which left the whole nation in sadness after just missing out on the FIFA World Cup for the second time in succession.

In 2023, at the age of 40, Adnan was called up to the Bahrain Olympic for the 2022 Asian Games and was named team captain. He appeared in three games during the competition before Bahrain was knocked out by North Korea in the round of 16.

== 2011 detention for dissent in Bahrain ==
On 5 April 2011, along with members of the Bahrain national football team A'ala and Mohamed Hubail, Sayed Mohamed Adnan was arrested by the Bahraini authorities, who claimed that the footballers had taken part in "illegal, violent protests". Local human rights activists maintained that the three footballers, together with more than 150 other sportsmen, women and administrators, had been targeted for punishment because they had been involved in protests against the government.

On 23 June, it was announced that Mohamed Hubail had been secretly tried and sentenced to two years in prison by the Bahraini special security court established under the martial law regime imposed in March 2011. On 24 June FIFA, the world football governing body, announced that it had asked the Bahraini football authorities to provide information about cases of players detained during political protests.

Following allegations of government interference in the sport after Mohammed Hubail's prison sentence and the suspension of over 150 athletes, coaches and referees for taking part in anti-government protests, Bahrain faced a ban from world football. Suspension by FIFA could prevent Bahrain participating in Asian Olympic Games qualifying round match.

According to the Office of the United Nations High Commissioner for Human Rights in Geneva, the trials appeared to bear the marks of political persecution and there were serious concerns that the due process rights of the defendants were not respected. On 29 June 2011 the Bahrain News Agency reported that the Bahrain Defence Force military public prosecutor had announced that "defendants involved at medical and sport crimes" had been released, but trials would continue in accordance with Bahraini legal procedures.
