= Massimo Murdocca =

Australian soccer player

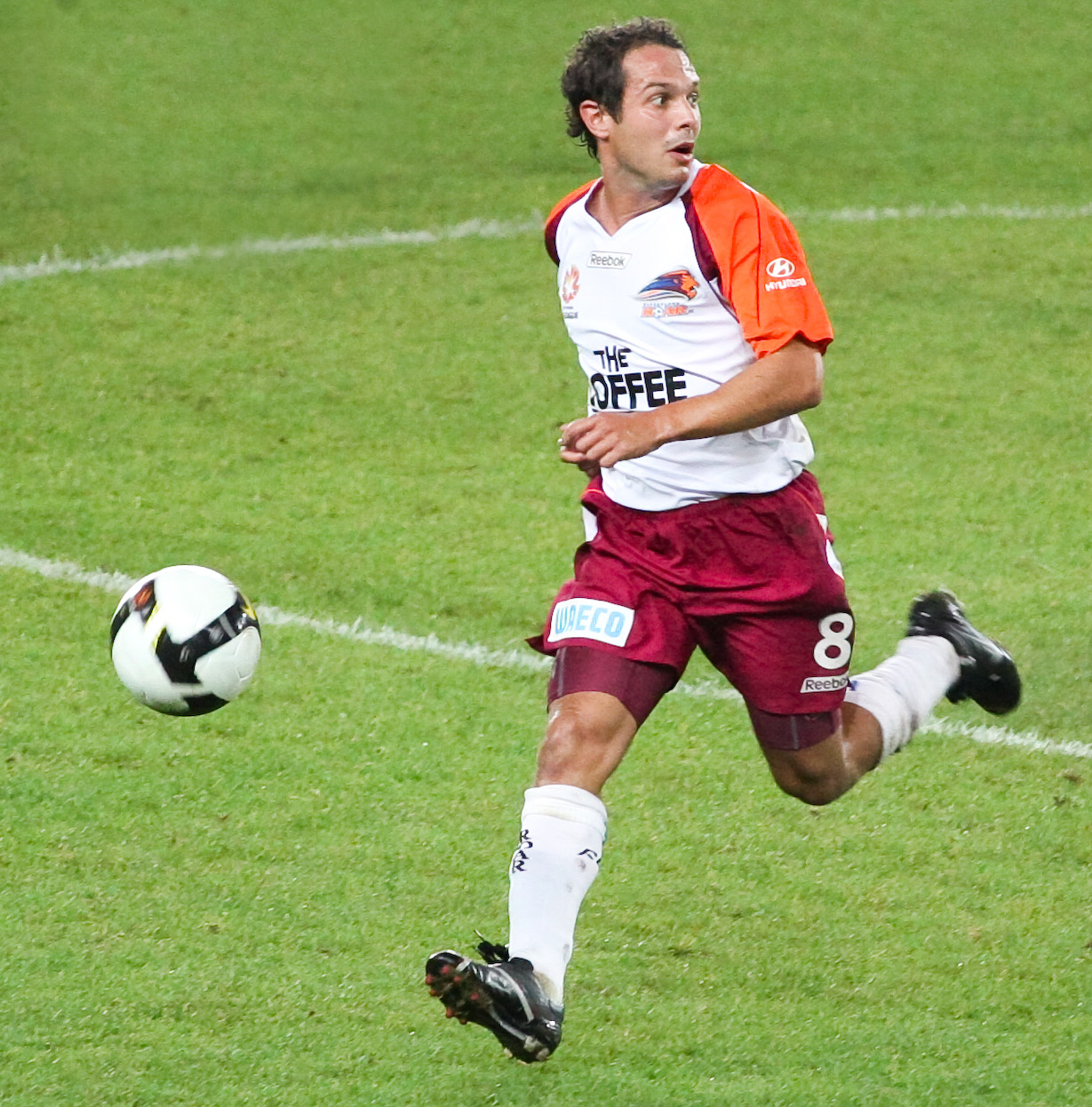
- Murdocca with Brisbane Roar in 2008

Personal information
- Full name: Massimo Murdocca
- Date of birth: 2 September 1984 (age 42)
- Place of birth: Carlton, Victoria Australia
- Height: 1.65 m (5 ft 5 in)
- Position: Central midfielder

Youth career
- Regent Bulla
- Fawkner Blues

Senior career*
Years	Team	Apps	(Gls)
1998–1999	Carlton SC	3	(0)
2000–2004	South Melbourne	59	(1)
2004–2005	Fawkner Blues	12	(0)
2005–2013	Brisbane Roar (Note: The team was known as Queensland Roar prior to 2009.)	162	(4)
2013–2015	Melbourne City (Note: The team was known as Melbourne Heart prior to 2014.)	44	(0)
2015–2017	Avondale	62	(3)
2018–2019	Nunawading City FC	28	(2)

International career
1999–2001	Australia U17	5	(0)
2003	Australia U20	2	(0)
2003–2004	Australia U23	1	(0)
Medal record
Representing Australia
Men's Association football
OFC U-20 Championship
Winner	2002 Fiji/Vanuatu
- * Club domestic league appearances and goals as of 25 September 2018

Massimo Murdocca (born 2 September 1984) is an Australian retired professional soccer player who last played as a right or central midfielder for National Premier Leagues club Nunawading City FC.

== Club career ==
Before joining Brisbane Roar, Murdocca played for South Melbourne and Carlton SC in the now defunct National Soccer League, and for Fawkner Blues in the Victorian Premier League.

Murdocca had a hugely successful spell with the Roar, making 182 appearances and scoring four goals over eight seasons from 2005 to 2013.

After his release from Brisbane, Murdocca signed a two-year deal with Melbourne Heart. Murdocca played in all 27 games of the 2013–14 A-League season, as his side finished in bottom place. The following season, Murdocca's role was reduced, starting in just 7 games. Murdocca was released from the club at the end of the 2014–15 season.

In May 2015 Murdocca signed with Avondale. Murdocca made 11 appearances in the second half of the 2015 NPL Victoria season, scoring two goals as his side finished ninth.

In November 2015, Avondale confirmed that Murdocca had signed on for the 2016 NPL Victoria season. Murdocca made 24 appearances as Avondale finished one place higher than the 2015 season, in eighth.

Murdocca, made captain for the 2017 season, led Avondale to the club's first ever finals series, after making 27 appearances in their run to third place. However, Avondale went 2-1 down to Oakleigh Cannons FC in the elimination round. Murdocca was given the NPL Victoria Gold Medal at the end of season awards night.

On 26 October 2017 it was announced Massimo had signed for Nunawading City FC where former Melbourne Heart/City teammates Patrick Gerhardt & James Brown were already.

== International career ==
Murdocca represented Australia in the 2003 FIFA World Youth Championship.

== Playing style ==
Murdocca is widely known in the A-League for his high work rate and stamina.

== Career statistics ==
=== Club ===
As of 26 May 2015

Club	Season	League^{1}		Cup		International^{2}		Total	
Club	Season	Apps	Goals	Apps	Goals	Apps	Goals	Apps	Goals
Brisbane Roar	2005–06	21	1	3	1	–	–	24	2
Brisbane Roar	2006–07	9	0	6	0	–	–	15	0
Brisbane Roar	2007–08	20	0	3	0	–	–	24	2
Brisbane Roar	2008–09	24	0	3	0	–	–	27	0
Brisbane Roar	2009–10	9	0	–	–	–	–	9	0
Brisbane Roar	2010–11	27	1	–	–	–	–	27	1
Brisbane Roar	2011–12	29	0	–	–	5	0	34	0
Brisbane Roar	2012–13	23	1	–	–	0	0	23	1
Brisbane Roar	Total	162	3	15	1	5	0	182	4
Melbourne City	2013–14	27	0	–	–	–	–	27	0
Melbourne City	2014–15	17	0	1	0	–	–	18	0
Melbourne City	Total	44	0	1	0	0	0	45	0
Career total		206	3	16	1	5	0	227	4

^{1} - includes A-League final series statistics
^{2} - includes FIFA Club World Cup statistics; AFC Champions League statistics are included in season ending during group stages (i.e. ACL 2012 and A-League 2011–12 seasons etc.)

== Honors ==
Brisbane

- A-League Premiership: 2010–2011
- A-League Championship: 2010–2011, 2011–12

Australia U-20

- OFC U-19 Men's Championship: 2002
