= Henrique (footballer, born 9 May 1985) =

Brazilian-Australian footballer

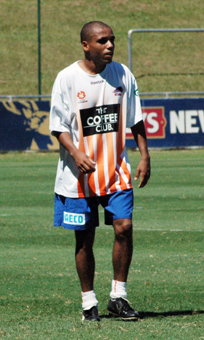
- Henrique training with Brisbane Roar in 2009

Personal information
- Full name: Henrique Andrade Silva
- Date of birth: 9 May 1985 (age 41)
- Place of birth: São Paulo, São Paulo, Brazil
- Height: 1.65 m (5 ft 5 in)
- Position: Winger

Team information
- Current team: Coomera Colts (sporting director)

Youth career
- 1999–2003: América Mineiro

Senior career*
| Years | Team | Apps | (Gls) |
| 2003–2004 | Feyenoord | 0 | (0) |
| 2004–2009 | América Mineiro | 36 | (10) |
| 2007 | → Guarani (loan) | 11 | (4) |
| 2007 | → Uberaba (loan) | 8 | (2) |
| 2008 | → Formiga (loan) | 18 | (6) |
| 2009 | → Brisbane Roar (loan) | 2 | (0) |
| 2009–2016 | Brisbane Roar | 136 | (39) |
| 2016 | Negeri Sembilan | 11 | (1) |
| 2016–2017 | Adelaide United | 13 | (3) |
| 2017 | Chiangrai United | 14 | (1) |
| 2018 | Jumpasri United | 0 | (0) |
| 2018–2019 | Brisbane Roar | 32 | (6) |
| 2019 | Coomera Colts | 4 | (6) |
| Total | | 285 | (78) |

Managerial career
- 2019–2020: Brisbane Roar U16
- * Club domestic league appearances and goals

Henrique Andrade Silva, generally known as Henrique (Brazilian Portuguese: [ẽˈʁiki]; born 9 May 1985), is a Brazilian-Australian former professional footballer who is the sporting director for Coomera Colts. On 7 October 2015, he officially became an Australian citizen.

== Career ==
Henrique played his youth football in Brazil with América Mineiro and in 2003 joined Dutch giants Feyenoord. After failing to break into the first team, Henrique returned to Brazil where he played senior football with América and was loaned out to several other Brazilian clubs. Henrique is nicknamed the Slippery Fish.

=== Brisbane Roar ===
Henrique joined Brisbane Roar initially as a temporary injury replacement for fellow Brazilian Reinaldo in February 2009, after impressing coach Frank Farina in a week-long trial after being given permission to talk with the Australian club by América.

He made his first appearance as a second-half substitute in the Roar's second-leg 2–1 win over Central Coast Mariners in the 2009 A-League semi-finals. There was minor controversy due to the transfer being completed only four hours before his debut appearance. Henrique signed a one-year contract with the Roar on 4 March 2009, after impressing during his loan spell.

On 17 September 2009, he signed a new three-year deal with the Roar. Henrique missed up to two months of the 2010–11 season because of a broken arm, which he injured in a match against Melbourne Victory. Henrique came back as a wild card for the Roar and in the 2010–11 grand final against Central Coast Mariners, scored a goal in extra-time and the winning penalty.

On 4 May 2014, Henrique scored the winning goal against the Western Sydney Wanderers in the 2014 Hyundai A-League Grand Final at Suncorp Stadium.

On 14 November 2014, Henrique came off the bench and scored a hat-trick as Brisbane Roar registered their first win of the season with a 4–0 result over Newcastle. Henrique finished the season rather early, as he was required to undergo knee reconstruction, effectively ruling him out for the rest of 2014–15. Despite this, he finished 2014–15 as his most successful, netting eight goals in 16 games.

Henrique netted a stunning goal, his third of the season, from half-way, lengthwise equivalent to 45 metres, as Roar defeated Melbourne City 3–1.

On 16 June 2016, it was announced that Henrique would depart the Roar after seven seasons with the club.

=== Adelaide United ===
On 27 August 2016, Henrique joined Adelaide United on a one-year deal. On 4 December 2016, Henrique scored a brace against Wellington Phoenix to win Adelaide United's first match of the 16/17 season, as the match ended 2–0.

=== Chiangrai United ===
On 31 January 2017, Henrique left Adelaide United after 13 games to join Thai club Chiangrai United

=== Return to Brisbane Roar ===
After training with Brisbane Roar and the club announcing they won't sign Henrique for the current season, on 22 February 2018, the club back-flipped on their decision and signed Henrique, including him in the match-day squad for the current round.

In December 2018, Henrique reached 150 games with Brisbane Roar and also scored a goal during the game against Adelaide United. He left the Roar after the 2018–19 season.

== Personal life ==
On 7 October 2015, Henrique officially became an Australian citizen. Four years after becoming an Australian citizen, he said: “I didn’t expect to be here for a decade. From the very first day, I fell in love with the city and Australia. I got my citizenship and my family is happy so I’m going to be around.”

== Honours ==
Brisbane Roar

- A-League Premiership: 2010–11, 2013–14
- A-League Championship: 2010–11, 2011–12, 2013–14
