= 2014 A-League Grand Final =

- Event: 2013–14 A-League
Brisbane Roar	Western Sydney Wanderers
2	1
- 1 – 1 at the conclusion of regulation time
- Date: 4pm AEST, 4 May 2014
- Venue: Suncorp Stadium, Brisbane
- Man of the Match: Thomas Broich, Brisbane Roar; Iacopo La Rocca, Western Sydney Wanderers
- Referee: Peter Green
- Attendance: 51,153

The 2014 A-League Grand Final was the ninth A-League Grand Final, and was played on 4 May 2014, at Suncorp Stadium, Brisbane. The match was contested by the two winning semi-finalists, Brisbane Roar and Western Sydney Wanderers, who finished first and second respectively in the 2013–14 A-League regular season. The match was won by Brisbane Roar, who beat Western Sydney Wanderers 2–1 in extra time, after the game was drawn at 1–1 at full-time.

That match was played in front of a sold-out crowd of 51,153 people. It was Brisbane Roar's third Grand Final victory in as many attempts whilst the match was Western Sydney Wanderers' second Grand Final loss.

== Teams ==
In the following table, finals until 2004 were in the National Soccer League era, since 2006 were in the A-League era.

Team	Previous final appearances (bold indicates winners)
Brisbane Roar	2 (**2011**, **2012**)
Western Sydney Wanderers	1 (2013)

== Route to the final ==
After the completion of the 2013–14 A-League regular season, the top six teams qualified for the Finals Series. Teams finishing 3rd-6th placed (Central Coast Mariners, Melbourne Victory, Sydney FC and Adelaide United) would have to begin the series in the elimination-finals, with the top two teams (Brisbane Roar and Western Sydney Wanderers) receiving byes into the semi-finals.

The first match of the elimination-finals saw 4th placed Melbourne Victory defeat 5th placed Sydney FC 2–1 on 18 April 2014, at Docklands Stadium. In the second elimination-finals match Central Coast Mariners defeated Adelaide United 1–0 on 19 April 2014, at Central Coast Stadium.

Central Coast Mariners progressed to play Western Sydney Wanderers at Pirtek Stadium on 26 April 2014. The match ended 2–0, with Western Sydney Wanderers progressing to their second consecutive A-League Grand Final. In the other semi-final, Brisbane Roar hosted and defeated Melbourne Victory 1–0 at Suncorp Stadium on 27 April 2014, to continue to the Grand Final, which Brisbane Roar hosted as the higher ranked team.

Elimination-finals
**Melbourne Victory**	**2**
Sydney FC	1
**Central Coast Mariners**	**1**
Adelaide United	0

Semi-finals
**Brisbane Roar**	**1**
Melbourne Victory	0
**Western Sydney Wanderers**	**2**
Central Coast Mariners	0

Grand Final
**Brisbane Roar** (a.e.t.)	**2**
Western Sydney Wanderers	1

== Pre-match ==
On 29 April it was announced that American singer Jason Derulo would perform during the pre-match show.

A-League 2013–14 Referee of the Year, Peter Green, was confirmed as the match referee, with David Walsh and Nathan MacDonald assisting and Kris Griffiths-Jones as the fourth official.

== Match ==
=== Summary ===
The match began with Western Sydney controlling the ball early on, not allowing the hosts to settle while threatening Brisbane's defence with a series of balls into the area. Wanderers had a claim for a penalty in the 15th minute when Mark Bridge's pass struck Ivan Franjic's arm in the box but referee Peter Green waved away the opportunity. Brisbane's first clear chance at goal came to the feet of Besart Berisha, but the Wanderers' defence was quick to close the striker down. The visitors had another scare in the 27th minute when Thomas Broich broke through the defence before producing a long-range drive which went just wide of the post. Wanderers continued to push back as the first half progressed and they were almost made to pay in the 44th minute, when Franjic's cross from defence clipped the crossbar before Luke Brattan curled a shot straight at Ante Covic as the first half came to a close with no goals scored.

The second half of the match was much more open with both teams pressing high to take shots in the opening few minutes. It did not take long for Wanderers to capitalise on an attempt when Matthew Spiranovic headed Shinji Ono's corner kick at the near post in the 55th minute. Roar responded positively and Berisha soon had a chance to level the score in the 67th minute when he was played in by Broich, only for his effort to be deflected just wide. Two minutes later and the player had another opportunity when he was found Broich's free-kick, but he headed the ball wide. Keen to turn their dominance into a goal, Brisbane coach Mike Mulvey brought on Henrique and Steven Lustica. Roar continued to commit players forward in their attack, however it almost became their downfall when Youssouf Hersi went close to settling the match in the 84th minute after he collected a deflected ball in the six-yard box but was immediately closed down by a desperate Roar defence. It proved significant as the Roar went on to equalise a minute later thanks to the combination of Broich and Berisha to send the match into extra time.

The first half of extra time was a back-and-forth affair. The match was settled three minutes into the second half of extra time when James Donachie cut back the ball to a waiting Henrique in the box. The Brazilian who, after settling, found the top of the net to give Brisbane the win.

=== Details ===
4 May 2014
16:00 AEST

Brisbane Roar	2–1 (a.e.t)	Western Sydney Wanderers
Berisha 86'; Henrique 108'	Reports	Špiranović 56'

Suncorp Stadium, Brisbane
Attendance: 51,153
Referee: Peter Green

**Brisbane Roar**	**Western Sydney Wanderers**

GK	1	(Australia) Michael Theo
RB	5	(Australia) Ivan Franjic
CB	13	(Australia) Jade North
CB	2	(Australia) Matt Smith (c)
LB	3	(Australia) Shane Stefanutto
RM	11	(Republic of Ireland) Liam Miller	(substituted off) 74'
CM	18	(Australia) Luke Brattan	(substituted off) 90'
LM	17	(Australia) Matt McKay
RF	23	(Australia) Dimitri Petratos	(substituted off) 69'
CF	7	(Albania) Besart Berisha
LF	22	(Germany) Thomas Broich
Substitutions:
GK	20	(Australia) Matthew Acton
DF	15	(Australia) James Donachie	(substituted on) 90'
MF	8	(Australia) Steven Lustica	(substituted on) 74'
FW	10	(Brazil) Henrique	(substituted on) 69'
FW	16	(Costa Rica) Jean Carlos Solórzano
Manager:
(England) Mike Mulvey

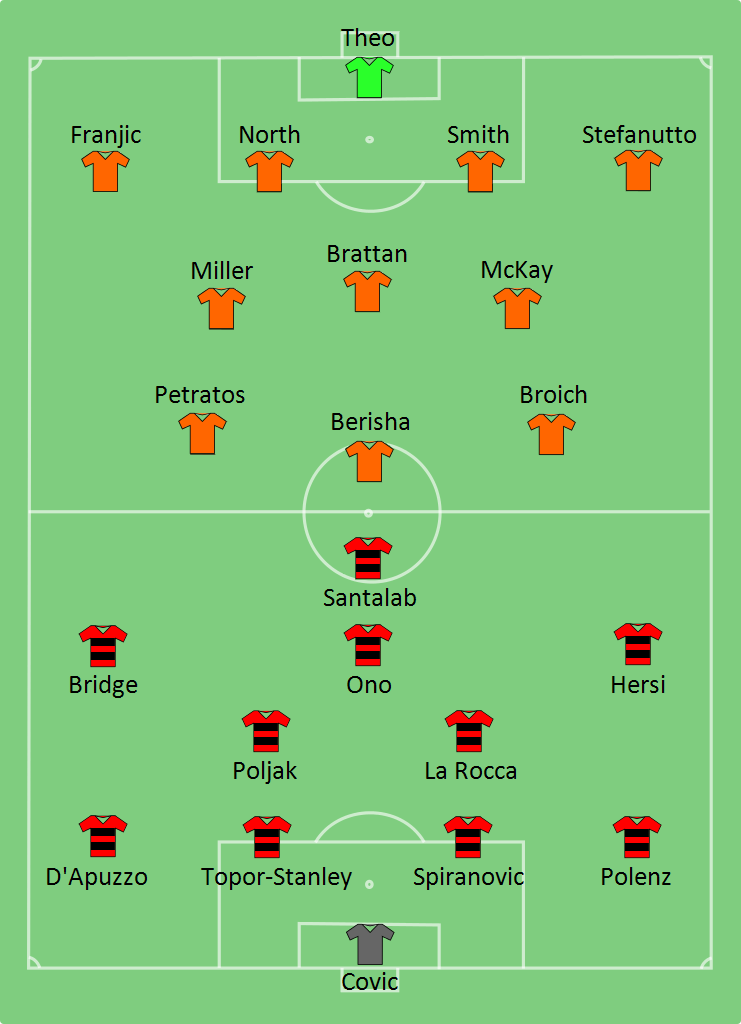

GK	1	(Australia) Ante Covic
RB	6	(Germany) Jérome Polenz	(yellow card) 107'
CB	13	(Australia) Matthew Spiranovic
CB	4	(Australia) Nikolai Topor-Stanley (c)		(substituted off) 64'
LB	3	(Australia) Adam D'Apuzzo	(yellow card) 39'
CM	18	(Italy) Iacopo La Rocca
CM	8	(Croatia) Mateo Poljak	(yellow card) 103'
RW	17	(Netherlands) Youssouf Hersi	(yellow card) 60'
AM	21	(Japan) Shinji Ono		(substituted off) 82'
LW	19	(Australia) Mark Bridge
CF	11	(Australia) Brendon Santalab	(yellow card) 25'	(substituted off) 71'
Substitutions:
GK	20	(Australia) Jerrad Tyson
DF	2	(Australia) Shannon Cole
MF	10	(Australia) Aaron Mooy	(yellow card) 109'	(substituted on) 64'
FW	7	(Australia) Labinot Haliti		(substituted on) 82'
FW	9	(Australia) Tomi Juric		(substituted on) 71'
Manager:
(Australia) Tony Popovic

Joe Marston Medal:
Thomas Broich (Brisbane Roar) &
Iacopo La Rocca (Western Sydney Wanderers)

Assistant referees:
David Walsh
Nathan MacDonald
Fourth official:
Kris Griffiths-Jones

Match rules:

- 90 minutes.
- 30 minutes of extra-time if necessary.
- Penalty shoot-out if scores still level.
- Five named substitutes.
- Maximum of three substitutions.

A-League
2014 Champions

**Brisbane Roar**
**Third Title**

=== Statistics ===
	Brisbane Roar	Western Sydney Wanderers
Goals scored	2	1
Total shots	20	10
Shots on target	5	7
Ball possession	59%	41%
Corner kicks	4	7
Fouls committed	13	32
Offsides	2	1
Yellow cards	0	6
Second yellow card & red card	0	0
Red cards	0	0

== Broadcasting ==
As well as being broadcast in Australia on Foxtel, the 2014 A-League Grand Final was the first to be broadcast on Australian free-to-air TV, with SBS showing the game on a one-hour delay. The Grand Final was also Broadcast live on SBS Radio for the first time. It was also the first A-League Grand Final to be broadcast live into major European, North American and Asian markets, with a total of 57 countries showing the game live, including Italy, the UK, Ireland, USA, China, Singapore, Mexico and South Africa. In addition, highlights of the match were shown in 53 countries throughout Asia and the Middle East, including Japan and South Korea. The match was also live streamed internationally.

The match was the most watched game in the nine season history of the A-League, setting records for both Fox Sports and SBS. The game attracted an average audience of 334,000 on Fox Sports 2, with peak of 524,000 viewers. Although on a one-hour delayed coverage, SBS 2 received an average audience of 358,000, with a peak of 772,000, the biggest audience ever achieved on the channel. Total viewer numbers were substantially higher than the 308,000 from the previous year's Grand Final.

== See also ==
- 2013–14 A-League
- List of A-League honours
- Replay the Full SBS Radio coverage
