= 2013–14 Brisbane Roar FC season =

Brisbane Roar FC
2013–14 season
- Chairman: Dali Tahir
- Manager: Mike Mulvey
- Stadium: Suncorp Stadium
- A-League: 1st
- A-League Finals series: Champions
- Top goalscorer: League: Besart Berisha (11); All: Besart Berisha (13)
- Highest home attendance: HAL: 21,841 (R1 v SFC); All: 51,153 (GF v WSW)
- Lowest home attendance: HAL: 10,101 (R25 v MH); All: 10,101 (R25 v MH)
- Average home league attendance: HAL: 14,957; All: 18,056
Home colours	Away colours	Third colours

The 2013–14 Brisbane Roar season was Roar's ninth season in the A-League. Having arguably fallen from their mantle of being the best team in the country, the Roar were striving to get back to title winning ways by any means necessary. The failure to qualify for the AFC Champions League was seen as an advantage, allowing the club to focus on domestic competition without the distraction of foreign competition. Manager Mike Mulvey was also looking to make his mark on the club during his first full pre season at the club and prove his credentials to the country in the new season.

== Squad lineup for 2013/14 ==
Correct as of 13 February 2014 – players numbers as per the official Brisbane Roar website Note: Flags indicate national team as defined under FIFA eligibility rules; some limited exceptions apply. Players may hold more than one non-FIFA nationality.

No.	Pos.	Nation	Player
1	GK	AUS	Michael Theo
2	DF	AUS	Matt Smith (Captain)
3	DF	AUS	Shane Stefanutto (Vice Captain)
5	DF	AUS	Ivan Franjić
7	FW	ALB	Besart Berisha
8	MF	AUS	Steven Lustica
10	FW	BRA	Henrique
11	MF	IRL	Liam Miller
12	FW	AUS	Julius Davies (Youth)
13	DF	AUS	Jade North
14	MF	AUS	Diogo Ferreira
15	DF	AUS	James Donachie
16	FW	CRC	Jean Carlos Solórzano
17	MF	AUS	Matt McKay

No.	Pos.	Nation	Player
18	MF	AUS	Luke Brattan
19	DF	AUS	Jack Hingert
20	GK	AUS	Matt Acton
22	MF	GER	Thomas Broich
23	MF	AUS	Dimitri Petratos
25	MF	AUS	George Lambadaridis
26	DF	AUS	Corey Brown
27	MF	AUS	Devante Clut
28	FW	AUS	Brandon Borrello (FT Youth)
30	MF	AUS	Ben Litfin (FT Youth)
33	GK	AUS	Fraser Chalmers (Youth)
34	FW	AUS	Patrick Theodore (FT Youth)
35	MF	AUS	Jai Ingham (Youth)

Successful trialists

- (Australia) Dimitri Petratos – Free agent
- (Australia) Diogo Ferreira – Free agent
- (Australia) Jai Ingham – (Australia) Olympic FC
- (Costa Rica) Jean Carlos Solórzano – Free agent

Unsuccessful trialists

- (Scotland) James Keatings – (Scotland) Celtic
- (France) Nicolas Bechar – (Australia) Sunshine Coast
- (Australia) Chris Lucas – (Australia) Palm Beach Sharks
- (Australia) Jarrod Kyle – (Australia) Palm Beach Sharks
- (England) Antonio Murray – (Australia) Brisbane City
- (Australia) Matt Thompson – Free agent
- (Australia) Aryn Williams – Free agent
- (Australia) Panny Nikas – (Australia) Sutherland Sharks
- (Australia) Jamie Young – Free agent
- (Democratic Republic of the Congo) (Australia) Kado Aoci – (Australia) Brisbane Wolves
- (Australia) Kaz Patafta – Free agent

== Transfers and contracts ==
=== New contracts ===
Date	Pos.	Name	Contract (Season end)	Notes
21 November 2013	DF	(Australia) James Donachie	2016/17	Re-Signing
9 January 2014	FW	(Australia) Dimitri Petratos	2015/16	Re-Signing
10 January 2014	DF	(Australia) Shane Stefanutto	2014/15	Re-Signing
13 February 2014	MF	(Australia) Devante Clut	2015/16	Re-Signing
13 February 2014	FW	(Australia) Patrick Theodore	2015/16	Re-Signing (Full Time Youth)
13 February 2014	FW	(Australia) Brandon Borrello	2015/16	Re-Signing (Full Time Youth)

=== Senior team ===
==== In ====
Date	Pos.	Name	From	Contract	Fee
4 March 2013	MF	(Australia) Ben Litfin	Brisbane Roar Youth	2014/15	Promoted
4 March 2013	FW	(Australia) Kwame Yeboah	Brisbane Roar Youth	2014/15	Promoted
22 May 2013	MF	(Republic of Ireland) Liam Miller	Free agent	2014/15	Free
27 June 2013	MF	(Australia) Diogo Ferreira	Free agent	2013/14	Free
27 June 2013	MF	(Australia) Dimitri Petratos	Free agent	2013/14	Free
11 August 2013	MF	(Australia) Matt McKay	Free agent	2014/15	Free
5 October 2013	FW	(Australia) Brandon Borrello	Brisbane Roar Youth	2014/15	Promoted
17 November 2013	FW	(Australia) Patrick Theodore	Brisbane Roar Youth	2014/15	Promoted
29 January 2014	FW	(Costa Rica) Jean Carlos Solórzano	Free agent	2013/14	Free
4 February 2013	MF	(Australia) Steven Lustica	(Australia) Adelaide United	2015/16	Free
13 February 2014	MF	(Australia) Devante Clut	Brisbane Roar Youth	2015/16	Promoted

==== Out ====
Date	Pos.	Name	To	Fee
17 April 2013	DF	(Australia) Matthew Jurman	Free agent	Free (Contract expired)
17 April 2013	MF	(Australia) James Meyer	Free agent	Free (Contract expired)
17 April 2013	MF	(Netherlands) Stef Nijland	(Netherlands) PSV Eindhoven	End of loan
10 May 2013	MF	(Australia) Mitch Nichols	Free agent	Free (Contract expired)
20 May 2013	MF	(Australia) Massimo Murdocca	(Australia) Melbourne Heart	Free (Contract mutually terminated)
22 May 2013	MF	(Australia) Ben Halloran	(Germany) Fortuna Düsseldorf	Undisclosed
27 June 2013	MF	(Australia) Steven Lustica	(Croatia) Hajduk Split	End of loan
17 July 2013	FW	(South Korea) Do Dong-Hyun	(Japan) F.C. Gifu	Free (Released)
1 January 2014	FW	(Australia) Kwame Yeboah	(Germany) Borussia Mönchengladbach	Undisclosed

=== Youth Team ===
==== In ====
Date	Pos.	Name	From	Contract	Fee
22 September 2013	MF	(Australia) Devante Clut	Free agent	????/??	Free
24 October 2013	FW	(Australia) Samed Altundag	(Italy) Perugia	????/??	Free
24 October 2013	FW	(Australia) Shannon Brady	(Australia) QAS	????/??	Free
24 October 2013	GK	(Australia) Denver Crickmore	(Australia) Buderim Wanderers	????/??	Free
24 October 2013	MF	(Australia) Sam Cronin	(Australia) QAS	????/??	Free
24 October 2013	MF	(Australia) Mitchell Hore	(Australia) QAS	????/??	Free
24 October 2013	MF	(Australia) Jai Ingham	(Australia) Olympic FC	????/??	Free
24 October 2013	MF	(Australia) Jordon Lampard	(Australia) Palm Beach Sharks	????/??	Free
24 October 2013	DF	(Australia) Jaiden Walker	(Australia) Murwillumbah FC	????/??	Free

==== Out ====
Date	Pos.	Name	To	Fee
4 March 2013	MF	(Australia) Ben Litfin	Brisbane Roar (Senior Team)	Promoted
4 March 2013	FW	(Australia) Kwame Yeboah	Brisbane Roar (Senior Team)	Promoted
5 October 2013	FW	(Australia) Brandon Borrello	Brisbane Roar (Senior Team)	Promoted
24 October 2013	FW	(Australia) Jordan Lambi	Free agent	Released
24 October 2013	DF	(Australia) Cameron Crestani	Free agent	Released
24 October 2013	MF	(Australia) Ross Archibald	(Australia) Melbourne Heart Youth	Released
24 October 2013	GK	(Australia) Nicholas Tubbs	Free agent	Released
13 February 2014	MF	(Australia) Devante Clut	Brisbane Roar (Senior Team)	Promoted

== Competitions ==
=== Overall ===
Competition	Current position / round	Final position / round	First match	Last match
A-League	1st	1st	13 October 2013	12 April 2014
Finals Series	1st	1st	27 April 2014	4 May 2014
National Youth League	—	7th	26 October 2013	1 March 2014
National Premier League	10th	10th	8 March 2014	31 August 2014

=== A-League ===
==== Preseason ====
16 July 2013 Friendly	**Lions FC (Australia)**	**1–0**	**(Australia) Brisbane Roar**	Richlands
Tuesday 19:00 AEST	Campbell 61'	Report		Stadium: Luxury Paints Stadium

23 July 2013 Friendly	**Albany Creek Excelsior (Australia)**	**0–5**	**(Australia) Brisbane Roar**	Albany Creek
Tuesday 19:00 AEST		Report	Murray 20', 32'; Petratos 42' (pen.); Brown 50'; Ferreira 64'	Stadium: Wolter Park; Referee: Jarred Gillett

31 July 2013 Friendly	**Brisbane City (Australia)**	**0–3**	**(Australia) Brisbane Roar**	Newmarket
Wednesday 19:00 AEST		Report	Miller 4'; Berisha 18'; Brown 30'	Stadium: Spencer Park

7 August 2013 Friendly	**Brisbane Strikers (Australia)**	**0–11**	**(Australia) Brisbane Roar**	Bowen Hills
Wednesday 19:00 AEST		Report	Petratos 2', 39'; Hooper 23' (o.g.); Berisha 30', 85'; Miller 37'; Hingert 41'; Broich 57', 62'; Theodore 81'; Murray 90' (pen.)	Stadium: Perry Park; Referee: Matthew Skinner

13 August 2013 Friendly	**Wynnum Wolves (Australia)**	**1–2**	**(Australia) Brisbane Roar**	Tingalpa
Tuesday 19:00 AEST	Janovsky 86'	Report	Berisha 82', 88'	Stadium: Carmichael Park

20 August 2013 Friendly	**Palm Beach Sharks (Australia)**	**0–3**	**(Australia) Brisbane Roar**	Palm Beach
Tuesday 19:00 AEST		Report	Georgopoulos 21'; Petratos 71' (pen.); Ferreira 81'	Stadium: Mallawa Drive Sporting Complex

25 August 2013 Friendly	**Melbourne Heart**	**0–3**	**Brisbane Roar**	Lismore
Sunday 14:30 AEST		Report	Berisha 1', 66', 83'	Stadium: Oakes Oval; Attendance: 5,132; Referee: David Wiebe

7 September 2013 Friendly	**Central Coast Mariners**	**1–2**	**Brisbane Roar**	Bathurst
Saturday 16:00 AEST	Simon 64'	Report	Miller 12'; Brown 60'	Stadium: Carrington Park

14 September 2013 Friendly	**Brisbane Roar**	**1–0**	**Melbourne Victory**	Ipswich
Saturday 15:15 AEST	Yeboah 83'	Report		Stadium: Qld Group Stadium; Attendance: 2,542; Referee: Alan Milliner

18 September 2013 Friendly	**Western Pride (Australia)**	**2–5**	**(Australia) Brisbane Roar**	Toowoomba
Wednesday 15:15 AEST	Woodruffe 25'; Drager 29'	Report	Borrello 6', 31'; Brady 39'; Yeboah 41'; Litfin 64'	Stadium: Toowoomba Grammar School; Attendance: 1,000

22 September 2013 Friendly	**Brisbane Roar**	**4–1**	**Sydney FC**	Cairns
Sunday 15:00 AEST	Yeboah 1', 51'; C. Brown 9'; Berisha 48'	Report	Chianese 70'	Stadium: Barlow Park; Attendance: 4,707

29 September 2013 Friendly	**Olympic FC (Australia)**	**1–11**	**(Australia) Brisbane Roar**	Yeronga
Sunday 15:00 AEST	Glockner 77'	Report	Broich 10', 48'; Litfin 18'; Yeboah 31', 60'; McKay 55', 72'; Henrique 66', 69', 77'; Borrello 87'	Stadium: Goodwin Park

==== Regular season ====
13 October 2013 1	**Wellington Phoenix**	**1–2**	**Brisbane Roar**	Wellington
Sunday 17:00 NZDT	Huysegems 22'	Report; Summary	Berisha 46'; Franjić 90+2'	Stadium: Westpac Stadium; Attendance: 8,239; Referee: Tim McGilchrist

19 October 2013 2	**Brisbane Roar**	**4–0**	**Sydney FC**	Brisbane
Saturday 18:30 AEST	Smith 37'; Henrique 39'; North 44'; Broich 80'	Report; Summary		Stadium: Suncorp Stadium; Attendance: 21,841; Referee: Peter Green

25 October 2013 3	**Melbourne Victory**	**1–0**	**Brisbane Roar**	Melbourne
Friday 19:30 AEDT	Troisi 56'	Report; Summary		Stadium: Etihad Stadium; Attendance: 21,693; Referee: Ben Williams

3 November 2013 4	**Brisbane Roar**	**3–0**	**Melbourne Heart**	Brisbane
Sunday 16:00 AEST	Henrique 48', 65'; Smith 77'	Report; Summary		Stadium: Suncorp Stadium; Attendance: 15,011; Referee: Lucien Laverdure

10 November 2013 5	**Central Coast Mariners**	**0–1**	**Brisbane Roar**	Gosford
Sunday 17:00 AEDT		Report; Summary	Yeboah 89'	Stadium: Bluetongue Stadium; Attendance: 8,303; Referee: Ben Williams

17 November 2013 6	**Newcastle Jets**	**2–1**	**Brisbane Roar**	Newcastle
Sunday 17:00 AEDT	Taggart 51', 74'; Jaliens (red card) 87'	Report; Summary	Brattan 39'	Stadium: Hunter Stadium; Attendance: 7,692; Referee: Matthew Gillett

22 November 2013 7	**Brisbane Roar**	**3–1**	**Western Sydney Wanderers**	Brisbane
Friday 19:00 AEST	Berisha 5'; Franjić 19'; Yeboah 90+1'	Report; Summary	Šantalab 28'	Stadium: Suncorp Stadium; Attendance: 19,066; Referee: Strebre Delovski

30 November 2013 8	**Brisbane Roar**	**1–0**	**Perth Glory**	Brisbane
Saturday 16:30 AEST	Berisha 57'	Report; Summary		Stadium: Suncorp Stadium; Attendance: 12,308; Referee: Tim McGilchrist

6 December 2013 9	**Adelaide United**	**1–2**	**Brisbane Roar**	Adelaide
Friday 19:00 ACDT	Malik 7'	Report; Summary	Berisha 21' (pen.), 72'	Stadium: Coopers Stadium; Attendance: 8,861; Referee: Peter O'Leary

14 December 2013 10	**Wellington Phoenix**	**1–2**	**Brisbane Roar**	Wellington
Saturday 17:30 NZDT	Hernández 48' (pen.)	Report; Summary	Smith 37'; Franjić 74'	Stadium: Westpac Stadium; Attendance: 6,127; Referee: Shaun Evans

20 December 2013 11	**Brisbane Roar**	**0–2**	**Newcastle Jets**	Brisbane
Friday 19:00 AEST		Report; Summary	Donachie 34' (o.g.); Gibbs 87'	Stadium: Suncorp Stadium; Attendance: 14,848; Referee: Peter Green

26 December 2013 12	**Sydney FC**	**2–5**	**Brisbane Roar**	Sydney
Thursday 19:30 AEDT	Del Piero 11'; Garcia 90+4'	Report; Summary	Broich 20'; Petratos 23' (pen.), 35', 78' (pen.); Franjić 90+3'	Stadium: Allianz Stadium; Attendance: 17,662; Referee: Ben Williams

4 January 2014 13	**Melbourne Victory**	**0–3**	**Brisbane Roar**	Melbourne
Saturday 19:30 AEDT		Report; Summary	Miller 28'; McKay 56'; Petratos 68'	Stadium: AAMI Park; Attendance: 23,121; Referee: Kris Griffiths-Jones

11 January 2014 14	**Brisbane Roar**	**1–2**	**Adelaide United**	Brisbane
Saturday 16:30 AEST	Berisha 80'; D. Ferreira (yellow card) 11' (yellow-red card) 40'	Report; Summary	Jerónimo 21'; Elsey 90+1'	Stadium: Suncorp Stadium; Attendance: 17,593; Referee: Alan Milliner

17 January 2014 15	**Perth Glory**	**0–0**	**Brisbane Roar**	Perth
Friday 18:45 AWST		Report; Summary	Berisha (yellow card) 2' (yellow-red card) 32'	Stadium: nib Stadium; Attendance: 11,026; Referee: Kris Griffiths-Jones

24 January 2014 16	**Brisbane Roar**	**2–1**	**Wellington Phoenix**	Brisbane
Friday 19:00 AEST	Clut 50'; Brattan 87'	Report; Summary	Huysegems 36'	Stadium: Suncorp Stadium; Attendance: 13,889; Referee: Chris Beath

2 February 2014 17	**Brisbane Roar**	**2–1**	**Central Coast Mariners**	Brisbane
Sunday 16:00 AEST	Henrique 66'; Berisha 90'	Report; Summary	Sterjovski 36' (pen.)	Stadium: Suncorp Stadium; Attendance: 16,078; Referee: Strebre Delovski

7 February 2014 18	**Western Sydney Wanderers**	**1–1**	**Brisbane Roar**	Parramatta
Friday 19:30 ADST	Haliti 85'	Report; Summary	Berisha 13'	Stadium: Pirtek Stadium; Attendance: 16,401; Referee: Kris Griffiths-Jones

16 February 2014 19	**Brisbane Roar**	**0–1**	**Newcastle Jets**	Brisbane
Sunday 16:00 AEST		Report; Summary	Taggart 59' (pen.)	Stadium: Suncorp Stadium; Attendance: 13,066; Referee: Takuto Okabe (Japan)

23 February 2014 20	**Melbourne Heart**	**1–0**	**Brisbane Roar**	Melbourne
Sunday 17:00 AEDT	Engelaar 61'	Report; Summary		Stadium: AAMI Park; Attendance: 7,816; Referee: Adam Kersey

28 February 2014 21	**Brisbane Roar**	**3–1**	**Perth Glory**	Brisbane
Friday 19:00 AEST	Franjić 56'; Miller 80'; Broich 85'	Report; Summary	Smeltz 90+1'	Stadium: Suncorp Stadium; Attendance: 10,896; Referee: Ben Williams

9 March 2014 22	**Brisbane Roar**	**2–1**	**Adelaide United**	Brisbane
Sunday 16:00 AEST	Berisha 22', 51'	Report; Summary	Jerónimo 90+3'	Stadium: Suncorp Stadium; Attendance: 12,514; Referee: Shaun Evans

14 March 2014 23	**Sydney FC**	**1–1**	**Brisbane Roar**	Sydney
Friday 19:30 AEDT	Ryall 35'	Report; Summary	Berisha 23' (red card) 40'	Stadium: Allianz Stadium; Attendance: 13,073; Referee: Peter O'Leary

22 March 2014 24	**Brisbane Roar**	**1–0**	**Melbourne Victory**	Brisbane
Saturday 18:30 AEST	Brattan 90+2'	Report; Summary		Stadium: Suncorp Stadium; Attendance: 17,965; Referee: Peter Green

28 March 2014 25	**Brisbane Roar**	**2–1**	**Melbourne Heart**	Brisbane
Friday 19:00 AEST	Petratos 36'; Berisha (red card) 49'; Henrique 73'	Report; Summary	Behich 18'	Stadium: Suncorp Stadium; Attendance: 10,101; Referee: Chris Beath

5 April 2014 26	**Western Sydney Wanderers**	**1–1**	**Brisbane Roar**	Parramatta
Saturday 19:30 AEDT	Juric 61'	Report; Summary	Miller 35'	Stadium: Pirtek Stadium; Attendance: 15,573; Referee: Peter Green

12 April 2014 27	**Brisbane Roar**	**0–2**	**Central Coast Mariners**	Brisbane
Saturday 19:30 AEST		Report; Summary	Fitzgerald 24'; Caceres 28'	Stadium: Suncorp Stadium; Attendance: 14,218; Referee: Kris Griffiths-Jones

==== Finals Series ====
27 April 2014 Semi-final	**Brisbane Roar**	**1–0**	**Melbourne Victory**	Brisbane
Sunday 17:00 AEST	Berisha 58'	Report; Summary		Stadium: Suncorp Stadium; Attendance: 28,350; Referee: Strebre Delovski

4 May 2014 Grand Final	**Brisbane Roar**	**2 – 1** **(a.e.t)**	**Western Sydney Wanderers**	Brisbane
Sunday 16:00 AEST	Berisha 86'; Henrique 108'	Report; Summary	Špiranović 56'	Stadium: Suncorp Stadium; Attendance: 51,153; Referee: Peter Green

==== Statistics ====
===== Results summary =====
Overall								Home						Away					
Pld	W	D	L	GF	GA	GD	Pts	W	D	L	GF	GA	GD	W	D	L	GF	GA	GD
27	16	4	7	43	25	+18	52	10	0	4	24	13	+11	6	4	3	19	12	+7

Last updated: 12 April 2014.
Source: Competitive matches

===== Ladder =====
Pos	Team	Pld	W	D	L	GF	GA	GD	Pts	Qualification
**1**	Brisbane Roar (C)	**27**	**16**	**4**	**7**	**43**	**25**	**+18**	52	**Qualificaition for 2015 AFC Champions League group stage and finals series**
2	Western Sydney Wanderers	27	11	9	7	34	29	+5	42	**Qualificaition for 2015 AFC Champions League group stage and finals series**
3	Central Coast Mariners	27	12	6	9	33	36	−3	42	Qualification for 2015 AFC Champions League qualifying play-off and finals series (Note: Since the winner of 2014 A-League Grand Final (Brisbane Roar) qualified for the 2015 AFC Champions League group stage, the 2nd and 3rd placed teams qualified for the group stage and the qualifying play-off of 2015 AFC Champions League.)
4	Melbourne Victory	27	11	8	8	42	43	−1	41	Qualification for Finals series
5	Sydney FC	27	12	3	12	40	38	+2	39	Qualification for Finals series
6	Adelaide United	27	10	8	9	45	36	+9	38	Qualification for Finals series
7	Newcastle Jets	27	10	6	11	34	34	0	36	
8	Perth Glory	27	7	7	13	28	37	−9	28	
9	Wellington Phoenix (Note: Wellington Phoenix cannot qualify for the AFC Champions League as they are not recognised as an AFC club.)	27	7	7	13	36	51	−15	28	
10	Melbourne Heart	27	6	8	13	36	42	−6	26	

Updated to match(es) played on 13 April 2014. Source: ultimatealeague.com
Rules for classification: 1) points; 2) goal difference; 3) number of goals scored.
(C) Champions

===== Results and position per round =====
Round	1	2	3	4	5	6	7	8	9	10	11	12	13	14	15	16	17	18	19	20	21	22	23	24	25	26	27
Ground	A	H	A	H	A	A	H	H	A	A	H	A	A	H	A	H	H	A	H	A	H	H	A	H	H	A	H
Result	W	W	L	W	W	L	W	W	W	W	L	W	W	L	D	W	W	D	L	L	W	W	D	W	W	D	L
Position	3	1	1	1	1	2	1	1	1	1	1	1	1	1	1	1	1	1	1	1	1	1	1	1	1	1	1

Updated to match(es) played on 12 April 2014. Source: Matches
A = Away; H = Home; W = Win; D = Draw; L = Loss

===== Squad statistics =====
Squad and statistics accurate as of 4 May 2014
90 Minutes played is counted as a full game. Injury Time is not counted. A sub's appearance is counted up to the 90th minute as well. If a substitution is made during extra time, it is counted as a full game (90mins) to the player that started. The substitute is credited with the number of minutes made up from 30 seconds for every substitution in the game by both teams combined. If there is an uneven number of substitutions made in total, the number of minutes is rounded up to the following number (2.5 mins = 3 mins).
If a shot is taken by a player but then saved by the goalkeeper before a follow-up shot scores a goal, the player/s that took the shot before the save is/are NOT credited with an assist
If a Finals game goes to Extra Time and a substitution is made, per the original rule, only the 30 minutes (2x 15-minute halves) is counted, NOT injury time. If the referee adds injury to either half and a substitution IS made during injury time, it also reverts to the original rule (2.5 mins = 3 mins)
A-League Games played: 27
Finals Games played: 2
Player has departed the club mid season
Player has joined the club mid season
Player has been injured before or during the season and in turn, has ended their season. For a player to be coloured, they need to miss 6 games before the end of the season (including finals)

No.	Nat.	Name	Contract	League					Finals					Total					Notes
No.	Nat.	Name	Contract	Start	Sub	Mins.	Goals	Assists	Start	Sub	Mins.	Goals	Assists	Start	Sub	Mins.	Goals	Assists	Notes
Goalkeepers
1	(Australia)	Michael Theo	2016/17	25	–	2250	–	–	2	–	210	–	–	**26**	–	**2340**	–	–	^{[4]}
20	(Australia)	Matt Acton	2013/14	2	–	180	–	–	–	–	–	–	–	**2**	–	**180**	–	–	
33	(Australia)	Fraser Chalmers	2013/14	–	–	–	–	–	–	–	–	–	–	–	–	–	–	–	
Defenders
2	(Australia)	Matt Smith	2015/16	27	–	2430	3	1	2	–	210	–	–	**28**	–	**2520**	**3**	**1**	^{[4]}
3	(Australia)	Shane Stefanutto	2014/15	16	–	1426	–	–	2	–	210	–	–	**17**	–	**1516**	–	–	^{[4]}
5	(Australia)	Ivan Franjić	2015/16	18	1	1618	5	3	2	–	210	–	–	**19**	**1**	**1708**	**5**	**3**	^{[4]}
13	(Australia)	Jade North	2015/16	20	–	1707	1	–	2	–	210	–	–	**21**	–	**1797**	**1**	–	^{[4]}
15	(Australia)	James Donachie	2016/17	9	5	925	–	1	–	1	30	–	1	**9**	**5**	**925**	–	**1**	^{[4]}
19	(Australia)	Jack Hingert	2015/16	17	3	1497	–	2	–	–	–	–	–	**17**	**3**	**1497**	–	**2**	
26	(Australia)	Corey Brown	2014/15	9	6	868	–	–	–	–	–	–	–	**9**	**6**	**868**	–	–	^{[1]}
Midfielders
8	(Australia)	Steven Lustica	2015/16	2	6	219	–	–	–	2	48	–	–	**2**	**7**	**221**	–	–	^{[2]} ^{[3]} ^{[4]}
11	(Republic of Ireland)	Liam Miller	2015/16	19	1	1554	3	3	2	–	164	–	–	**20**	**1**	**1644**	**3**	**3**	^{[1]} ^{[3]} ^{[4]}
14	(Australia)	Diogo Ferreira	2013/14	8	3	599	–	–	–	–	–	–	–	**8**	**3**	**599**	–	–	
17	(Australia)	Matt McKay	2014/15	21	1	1887	1	6	2	–	210	–	1	**22**	**1**	**1977**	**1**	**7**	^{[4]}
18	(Australia)	Luke Brattan	2014/15	26	–	2209	3	3	2	–	180	–	–	**27**	–	**2299**	**3**	**3**	^{[4]}
22	(Germany)	Thomas Broich	2016/17	27	–	2430	3	10	2	–	210	–	1	**28**	–	**2520**	**3**	**10**	^{[4]}
25	(Australia)	George Lambadaridis	2014/15	–	–	–	–	–	–	–	–	–	–	–	–	–	–	–	
27	(Australia)	Devante Clut	2015/16	1	–	72	1	–	–	–	–	–	–	**1**	–	**72**	**1**	–	
30	(Australia)	Ben Litfin	2014/15	–	–	–	–	–	–	–	–	–	–	–	–	–	–	–	
35	(Australia)	Jai Ingham	????/??	–	1	18	–	–	–	–	–	–	–	–	**1**	**18**	–	–	
Forwards
7	(Albania)	Besart Berisha	2013/14	17	1	1291	11	–	2	–	210	2	–	**18**	**1**	**1381**	**12**	–	^{[4]}
10	(Brazil)	Henrique	2015/16	13	12	1254	5	2	–	2	62	1	–	**13**	**13**	**1265**	**5**	**2**	^{[4]}
12	(Australia)	Julius Davies	2014/15	–	–	–	–	–	–	–	–	–	–	–	–	–	–	–	
16	(Costa Rica)	Jean Carlos Solórzano	2013/14	1	4	119	–	–	–	–	–	–	–	**1**	**4**	**119**	–	–	
23	(Australia)	Dimitri Petratos	2015/16	16	9	1586	5	–	2	–	148	–	–	**17**	**9**	**1665**	**5**	–	^{[2]} ^{[4]}
28	(Australia)	Brandon Borrello	2015/16	–	6	78	–	–	–	–	–	–	–	–	**6**	**78**	–	–	
29	(Australia)	Kwame Yeboah	2014/15	3	7	313	2	–	–	–	–	–	–	**3**	**7**	**313**	**2**	–	
34	(Australia)	Patrick Theodore	2015/16	–	1	6	–	–	–	–	–	–	–	–	**1**	**6**	–	–	

- ^{[1]} – Corey Brown replaced Liam Miller in the 90th minute vs Central Coast Mariners FC in (Rnd 17). 5 substitutions were made in total (3mins)
- ^{[2]} – Steven Lustica replaced Dimitri Petratos in the 90th minute vs Western Sydney Wanderers FC in (Rnd 18). 5 substitutions were made in total (3mins)
- ^{[3]} – Steven Lustica replaced Liam Miller in the 90th minute vs Melbourne Victory FC in (semi-final). 4 substitutions were made in total (2mins)
- ^{[4]} – Despite the regular time of a match being 90 minutes, the Grand Final went to Extra Time, an additional 30 minutes. In total, this equates, in the finals columns, 120 minutes (90mins + 30mins = 120mins). This note is only added to those players who featured in the Grand Final

===== Disciplinary record =====
Correct as of 4 May 2014
Red card column denotes players who were sent off after receiving a straight red card. The two yellow cards column denotes players who were sent off after receiving two yellow cards.

#	**Nat.**	**Pos.**	**Name**	**League**			**Finals**			Total		
#	**Nat.**	**Pos.**	**Name**	Yellow card	Yellow card	Red card	Yellow card	Yellow card	Red card	Yellow card	Yellow card	Red card
11	(Republic of Ireland)	MF	Liam Miller	6	–	–	1	–	–	7	–	–
7	(Albania)	FW	Besart Berisha	3	1	2	–	–	–	3	**1**	**2**
14	(Australia)	MF	Diogo Ferreira	3	1	–	–	–	–	3	**1**	–
18	(Australia)	MF	Luke Brattan	6	–	–	–	–	–	5	–	–
19	(Australia)	DF	Jack Hingert	4	–	–	–	–	–	4	–	–
2	(Australia)	DF	Matt Smith	4	–	–	–	–	–	4	–	–
13	(Australia)	DF	Jade North	3	–	–	–	–	–	3	–	–
1	(Australia)	GK	Michael Theo	3	–	–	–	–	–	3	–	–
3	(Australia)	DF	Shane Stefanutto	3	–	–	–	–	–	3	–	–
5	(Australia)	DF	Ivan Franjić	3	–	–	–	–	–	2	–	–
17	(Australia)	MF	Matt McKay	2	–	–	–	–	–	2	–	–
22	(Germany)	MF	Thomas Broich	2	–	–	–	–	–	2	–	–
26	(Australia)	DF	Corey Brown	2	–	–	–	–	–	2	–	–
10	(Brazil)	FW	Henrique	1	–	–	–	–	–	1	–	–
			**TOTALS**	**40**	**2**	**2**	**1**	**0**	**0**	41	**2**	**2**

===== League Goalscorers per Round =====
Correct as of 4 May 2014.

Total	Player		Goals per Round																												
Total	Player		1	2	3	4	5	6	7	8	9	10	11	12	13	14	15	16	17	18	19	20	21	22	23	24	25	26	27	SF	GF
13	(Albania)	Besart Berisha	1						1	1	2					1			1	1				2	1					1	1
6	(Brazil)	Henrique		1		2													1								1				1
5	(Australia)	Ivan Franjić	1						1			1		1									1								
5	(Australia)	Dimitri Petratos												3	1												1				
3	(Australia)	Matt Smith		1		1						1																			
3	(Germany)	Thomas Broich		1										1									1								
3	(Australia)	Luke Brattan						1										1								1					
3	(Republic of Ireland)	Liam Miller													1								1					1			
2	(Australia)	Kwame Yeboah^{[1]}					1		1																						
1	(Australia)	Jade North		1																											
1	(Australia)	Matt McKay													1																
1	(Australia)	Devante Clut																1													
46	TOTAL		2	4	0	3	1	1	3	1	2	2	0	5	3	1	0	2	2	1	0	0	3	2	1	1	2	1	0	1	2

Goal scored from a penalty kick Two goals scored from penalty kicks Player suspended Player injured/sick Player on international duty Player was unused sub Player not in match-day squad

- ^{[1]} Kwame Yeboah left the club following the Round 12 fixture against Sydney FC.

===== Home attendance =====
The two attendance figures in BOLD signals the highest attendances for both the regular season and overall highest attendance
Win Draw Loss
League attendance and average includes Finals Series

Competition	Round	Date	Day	Time	Score	Opponent	Attendance
A-League	2	19 October 2013	Saturday	18:45	4–0	Sydney FC	**21,841**
A-League	4	3 November 2013	Sunday	16:00	3–0	Melbourne Heart	15,011
A-League	7	22 November 2013	Friday	19:00	3–1	Western Sydney Wanderers	19,066
A-League	8	30 November 2013	Saturday	16:30	1–0	Perth Glory	12,308
A-League	11	20 December 2013	Friday	19:00	0–2	Newcastle Jets	14,848
A-League	14	11 January 2014	Saturday	16:30	1–2	Adelaide United	17,593
A-League	16	24 January 2014	Friday	19:00	2–1	Wellington Phoenix	13,889
A-League	17	2 February 2014	Sunday	16:00	2–1	Central Coast Mariners	16,078
A-League	19	16 February 2014	Sunday	16:00	0–1	Newcastle Jets	13,066
A-League	21	28 February 2014	Friday	19:00	3–1	Perth Glory	10,896
A-League	22	9 March 2014	Sunday	16:00	2–1	Adelaide United	12,514
A-League	24	22 March 2014	Saturday	18:45	1–0	Melbourne Victory	17,965
A-League	25	28 March 2014	Friday	19:00	2–1	Melbourne Heart	10,101
A-League	27	12 April 2014	Saturday	19:45	0–2	Central Coast Mariners	14,218
Finals Series	Semi Final	27 April 2014	Sunday	17:00	1–0	Melbourne Victory	28,350
Finals Series	Grand Final	4 May 2014	Sunday	16:00	2–1	Western Sydney Wanderers	**51,153**
						Total League Attendance	209,394
						Total League Average Attendance	14,957
						Total Attendance	288,897
						Total Average Attendance	18,056

== See also ==
- Brisbane Roar FC records and statistics
- List of Brisbane Roar FC players
- Brisbane Roar end of season awards
- Brisbane Roar website
- A-League website
- National Youth League website

== Awards ==
- Player of the Week (Round 2) – Thomas Broich
- Player of the Week (Round 12) – Dimitri Petratos
- Player of the Week (Round 16) – Luke Brattan
- Player of the Week (Round 17) – Thomas Broich
- NAB Young Footballer of the Month (January) – Dimitri Petratos
