= 2010–11 Brisbane Roar FC season =

Coordinates: 27°27′53″S 153°0′34″E

Brisbane Roar
2010–11 season
- Chairman: Chris Bombolas
- Manager: Ange Postecoglou
- A-League: 1st (Premiers)
- Finals: 1st (champions)
- Top goalscorer: League: Jean Carlos Solórzano, Kosta Barbarouses (11 Goals Each); All: Kosta Barbarouses (12 Goals)
- Highest home attendance: League: 20,831 vs Gold Coast United, 12 February 2011 (Round 30); All: 50,168 vs Central Coast Mariners, 13 March 2011 (grand final)
- Lowest home attendance: League: 3,522 vs Wellington Phoenix, 26 January 2011 (Round 27); All: 3,522 vs Wellington Phoenix, 26 January 2011 (Round 27)
- Average home league attendance: League: 9,279; All: 12,619
Home colours	Away colours

The 2010–11 season was Brisbane Roar's 6th season in the A-League. On Friday 4 February 2011, Brisbane Roar were confirmed as Premiers with two games remaining in the regular season. The seasons' Premiers Plate is the first piece of silverware for the club and meant automatic qualification for the group stages of the 2012 Asian Champions League. After a thrilling grand final which went to a penalty shootout, the Roar prevailed and were crowned A-League Champions.

== Squad Lineup for 2010/11 ==
Correct as of 1 January 2011 – players numbers as per the official Brisbane Roar website Note: Flags indicate national team as defined under FIFA eligibility rules; some limited exceptions apply. Players may hold more than one non-FIFA nationality.

No.	Pos.	Nation	Player
1	GK	AUS	Michael Theoklitos
2	DF	AUS	Matt Smith
4	DF	AUS	Shane Stefanutto (Vice Captain)
5	DF	AUS	Ivan Franjic
6	MF	AUS	Erik Paartalu
7	FW	NZL	Kosta Barbarouses (Youth)
8	MF	AUS	Massimo Murdocca
9	FW	CRC	Jean Carlos Solórzano
10	MF	BRA	Henrique
12	DF	AUS	Matt Mundy

No.	Pos.	Nation	Player
14	MF	AUS	Rocco Visconte (Youth)
15	MF	AUS	Matt McKay (Captain)
16	DF	AUS	Daniel Bowles (Youth)
17	MF	AUS	Mitch Nichols
18	MF	AUS	Luke Brattan
19	MF	AUS	Chris Bush (Youth)
20	GK	AUS	Andrew Redmayne
21	MF	AUS	James Meyer
22	MF	GER	Thomas Broich
23	DF	AUS	Milan Susak

Current Trialists

- n/a

Unsuccessful Trialists

- (Australia) Dean Evans from Perth Glory Youth Team
- (Australia) Ludovic Boi from Perth Glory Youth Team
- (Australia) Daniel Visevic from Richmond SC
- (Australia) Adrian Zahra from Melbourne Knights
- (Australia) Nathan Sherlock from Sydney FC Youth Team
- (South Korea) Kim Min Kyum from Chunnam Dragons
- (Uruguay) Waldemar Acosta – Free Agent

== Transfers ==
=== In ===
Date	Pos.	Name	From	Contract	Fee
18 January 2010	GK	(Australia) Andrew Redmayne	(Australia) Central Coast Mariners	2 Years	Free
11 February 2010	FW	(New Zealand) Kosta Barbarouses	(New Zealand) Wellington Phoenix	3 Years	Free
24 February 2010	MF	(Australia) Luke Brattan	(Australia) Brisbane Roar (Youth)	3 Years	N/A
24 February 2010	MF	(Australia) Erik Paartalu	(Scotland) Greenock Morton	3 Years	Free
14 March 2010	GK	(Australia) Michael Theoklitos	(England) Norwich City	3 Years	Free
13 April 2010	DF	(Australia) Shane Stefanutto	(Australia) North Queensland Fury	3 Years	Free
16 April 2010	DF	(Australia) Matt Smith	(Australia) North Queensland Fury	2 Years	Free
10 May 2010	MF	(Australia) Rocco Visconte	(Scotland) Hearts	1 Year	Free
11 May 2010	MF	(Germany) Thomas Broich	(Germany) 1. FC Nürnberg	3 Years	Free
10 June 2010	DF	(Australia) Milan Susak	(Germany) SpVgg Unterhaching	2 Years	Free
30 June 2010	MF	(Australia) James Meyer	(Australia) Eastern Suburbs F.C.	1 Year	Free
15 July 2010	FW	(Costa Rica) Jean Carlos Solórzano	(Costa Rica) L.D. Alajuelense	1 Year	Loan
31 December 2010	MF	(Australia) Chris Bush	(Australia) Brisbane Roar (Youth)	1 Year	N/A
7 February 2011	DF	(Australia) Daniel Bowles	(Australia) Brisbane Roar (Youth)	1 Year	N/A

=== Out ===
Date	Pos.	Name	To	Fee
14 March 2010	FW	(Netherlands) Serginho van Dijk	(Australia) Adelaide United	End of contract
2 April 2010	MF	(Australia) Thomas Oar	(Netherlands) FC Utrecht	Undisclosed
2 April 2010	MF	(Australia) Adam Sarota	(Netherlands) FC Utrecht	Undisclosed
2 April 2010	MF	(Australia) Michael Zullo	(Netherlands) FC Utrecht	Undisclosed
5 April 2010	GK	(Australia) Matt Ham	(Australia) North Queensland Fury	End of contract
5 April 2010	GK	(Australia) Griffin McMaster	(Australia) Oakleigh Cannons	End of contract
19 April 2010	DF	(Australia) Andrew Packer	Retired	Mutual Termination
3 June 2010	MF	(Australia) Isaka Cernak	(Australia) North Queensland Fury	End of contract
Other	DF	(Belgium) Pieter Collen	Released	End of Contract
Other	DF	(Australia) Josh McCloughan	Retired	End of Contract
Other	MF	(Australia) David Dodd	(Australia) Manly United	End of Contract
Other	FW	(Australia) Tim Smits	(Australia) Rochedale Rovers	End of Contract
15 December 2010	FW	(Brazil) (Australia) Reinaldo	(Qatar) Al-Ahli	Undisclosed
26 January 2011	DF	(Australia) Luke DeVere	(South Korea) Gyeongnam	Undisclosed

== Season ==
=== Season recap ===
The club faced the losses of top scorer Sergio van Dijk to A-League team Adelaide United, and established youngsters Tommy Oar, Michael Zullo and Adam Sarota to overseas club FC Utrecht. Despite losing some of the team's forwards; new signings and a restructure in formations saw the Roar start the season well and playing an entertaining brand of football. On 20 October, Roar defeated Central Coast Mariners 2–0, with strikes from Thomas Broich and Ivan Franjic. After 1/3 of the way through the season, Brisbane Roar continue to play beautiful football after drawing 1–1 against Sydney FC at the SFS on 30 October. Following that result, Brisbane had racked up six wins, five draws and a solitary loss to the Melbourne Victory in Melbourne on 12 September. On 3 November 2010, Brisbane ended Wellington Phoenix's record home undefeated record of 24 games as the Roar defeated the Phoenix 4–1.

Following the third game in eight days, the Roar thrashed Adelaide United 4–0 with a 10-man squad. Striker Reinaldo was sent off in the second-half following the first goal in the first half. The crowd for the game was the biggest for the Roar in the season so far with 13,248 attending. Adelaide United coach Rini Coolen credited the way the Roar play, saying "They are definitely the best team we've played against and definitely the best team in the league. It was too much for us today and 4–0 was a fair result. They're getting better and better. The way they play, the movement, the transition movement, it's a real high level. It's the biggest level here in our league and it's definitely a kind of level that belongs to Europe."

On 28 November 2010, against Central Coast Mariners, the Brisbane Roar broke another record by going undefeated in 14 matches, beating the previous record of 13 set by Adelaide United earlier in the season. The match ended 5–1. The Roar would follow up their record run against Melbourne Victory, drawing 3–3 at the death in a heated match with Matt McKay scoring with the last kick of the game to ensure Brisbane would stretch their unbeaten period to 15 matches. There was a number of controversies in the match, both on and off the field. The first came when Roar goalkeeper Michael Theoklitos appeared to catch the ball while being outside his penalty box which the referee appeared to have missed or waved away. Michael Theoklitos then booted the ball down field where Reinaldo would nod the ball onto an on running Matt McKay to level the match despite efforts by Michael Petkovic and the Victory defence. The second would come at the end of the match with hardman Kevin Muscat punching Roar goalkeeping coach Fernando Vaz Alves in the stomach during an altercation. Muscat received an official reprimand and a $1,500 fine.

The Roar would break another record on 12 December 2010, by grabbing their first win in the A-League at the Sydney Football Stadium, defeating Sydney FC 1–0. The win would see another record brought into the light, becoming only the 2nd club behind South Melbourne FC in the 2000/01 season, coincidentally coached at the time by current Roar coach Ange Postecoglou, by going 16 matches undefeated in an Australian league. It was revealed on 15 December 2010, after he had been left out of the lineup altogether for the match against Sydney FC a few days before, that Reinaldo had played his last game for the Roar after signing a 2-year, $2,000,000 contract for Qatari club Al Ahli. In the second M1 Derby of the season on Boxing Day, 2010, The Roar played out a spectacular 2–2 draw with the Gold Coast United, with some labeling it one of the best matches of the season to date. What added more to the match was that it was played in torrential rain. The rain bucketed down without reprieve for the whole match, with the lines on the pitch having to be remarked at both the half time interval and the 82nd minute. The result extended the Roar's record unbeaten run to 18 matches

With the departure of Reinaldo to Qatari club Al-Ahli, youth team captain Chris Bush was brought into the senior team to make up the minimum squad number of 20. With the 2010–11 Queensland floods wreaking havoc in South East Queensland and other parts of the state, the Roar were left without a home ground to play at after Suncorp Stadium was flooded in and also caught fire due to a small explosion in an isolated transformer room. The Roar's fixtures that were disrupted were changed with the initial match between the Roar and Wellington Phoenix being moved from 16 to 26 January in a hope the stadium would be ready to house the fixture. The match was later moved to Skilled Park by the FFA with the Roar's next match, also a home fixture, being moved back a day to the 29th from the 28th, also at the same venue.

On Australia Day 2011, Brisbane Roar had a bitter sweet meeting with Wellington Phoenix in a rescheduled fixture at Skilled Park due to the 2010–11 Queensland floods. Although winning the fixture 2–0 with both goals by supersub James Meyer, it would see the farewell of solid defender Luke DeVere, Brisbane Roar's 2009–2010 player of the season, who departed for Korean club Gyeongnam. On 29 January 2011, Brisbane Roar would beat the longest unbeaten streak by an Australian football team, held by APIA Leichhardt in the 1986–87 NSL season, by going 23 games undefeated. On Friday 4 February 2011, Brisbane Roar were confirmed as Premiers with two games remaining in the regular season as second placed Central Coast Mariners failed to beat Melbourne Heart. The seasons' Premiers Plate is the first piece of silverware for the club and meant automatic qualification for the group stages of the 2012 Asian Champions League.

On 7 February 2011, Brisbane Roar youth team player Daniel Bowles signed a 1-year contract as a replacement for the departed Luke DeVere. On 10 February 2011, Brisbane Roar signed Matthew Jurman for the 2011/2012 season, with the young defender joining the team on a 2-year deal after Sydney FC's 2011 Asian Champions League campaign. On 12 February 2011, the Brisbane Roar W League team won its second championship in 3 years by beating Sydney FC 2–1 in the grand final at Campbelltown Stadium. The same night, the Roar would record their first win in the M1 Derby by defeating Gold Coast United for the first time on return to Suncorp Stadium after the 2010–11 Queensland floods in a resounding 4–0 victory in front of their best crowd of the regular season of 20,831. After the game, the Roar were presented with the Premier's Plate, after a fantastic season where the Roar only lost 1 game.

At the PFA Team of the Year presentation, 7 Brisbane Roar players out of the possible 11 starting lineup were selected with Roar skipper Matt McKay being chosen to captain the side. The other players in the starting side in a 4–3–3 formation were Michael Theoklitos, Ivan Franjic, Luke DeVere and Matt Smith, Matt McKay, Thomas Broich and Kosta Barbarouses. Roar striker Jean Carlos Solórzano, on loan from Costa Rican side L.D. Alajuelense made it onto the bench of 5 with Ange Postecoglou being named as coach. Unrecognised at the PFA Awards was the fact the Brisbane Roar took out both the best defence and best attack in the season, with 58 goals scored and 26 conceded respectively. The Roar also won the A-League Fair-Play Trophy for the season, being the most disciplined in the league.

On 26 February 2011, the Brisbane Roar would draw 2–2 with the Central Coast Mariners in the 2nd Leg of the major semi-final, winning the tie 4–2 on aggregate after defeating the Mariners 2–0 in the 1st leg at Bluetongue Stadium. The win in the tie means the Roar will have a weeks break before hosting the grand final on Sunday, 13 March 2011 at Suncorp Stadium. On 5 March 2011, Central Coast Mariners would win the rights to face Brisbane in the 2010–11 A-League grand final, defeating Gold Coast United 1–0 at Bluetongue Stadium. The following day at the annual A League awards night, the presentation for all of the awards for both the A-League and W-League, the Roar collected 4 awards. The club had won the A-League Fair-Play Trophy along with Ange Postecoglou being named Manager of the Year. The other two awards would go to Michael Theoklitos and Erik Paartalu respectively. The former would be named Goalkeeper of the Year and the latter picking up the Solo Goal of the Year award with his stunning volley into the top corner of the net against Gold Coast United in the final game of the regular season.

To top off a remarkable season, Brisbane would go on to win the 2011 A-League Grand Final, and in one of the most spectacular fashions ever seen in Australian football. After finishing 0–0 in regular play, the game went to extra time, with the Mariners scoring twice in the first period, and looked to have sealed the game. But with only four minutes of play left, Brisbane netted home what looked to be a consolation goal through Henrique, before Erik Paartalu headed in a corner from the last play of the game to make it 2–2. The game went on to penalties. Roar Goalkeeper of the Year Michael Theoklitos saved 2 penalty shots to win 4–2 in the penalty shootout. In front of a 50,168 record crowd for both the Roar and football in Brisbane, Ange Postecoglou would be left in awe, saying "We've had an absolutely extraordinary season, so I should have expected an extraordinary finish." The Roar were given the keys to the city after winning the grand final, with the presentation of the key including a tickertape parade to honour the team for their success.

The future surrounding Ange Postecoglou's future at the club were ended on 18 March 2011, when it was announced by both the FFA, who were financially aiding the club after the Roar's license was taken back to ease the burden on the owners, and the club that the reigning Manager of the Year had signed a 2-year addition to his current contract that would see him at the helm for the Roar until the end of the 2013–14 season, assuring he would coach the team through the 2012 Asian Champions League.

At the Roar's end of season awards night, German import Thomas Broich would take home the coveted Gary Wilkins Medal as the best player of the season. Captain Matt McKay would pick up two awards, winning both the Player's Player Awards and the Member's Player of the Year Award. Kiwi Kosta Barbarouses would pick up the clubs Golden Boot by scoring 12 goals, edging out Jean Carlos Solórzano by 1 goal, despite being tied with him on 11 at the end of the regular season. Barbarouses would score against the Central Coast Mariners in the 1st leg of the major semi-final at Bluetongue Stadium to take home the award. English born defender Matt Smith would pick up the Queensland Roars Against Racism Ambassador Award as well as young defender James Donachie picking up the Youth League Player of the Year Award. Matilda Elise Kellond-Knight picked up the W League Player of the Year Award with teammate Aivi Luik picking up the W League Player's Player Award.

=== Pre-season ===
==== Roar Roadshow ====
Pre-Season Friendly; 19 May 2010	Brisbane City	2–3	Brisbane Roar	Newmarket
19:15 UTC+10	Last 21'; Knipe 66'	(Report)	Nichols 24' 55'; Henrique 72'	Stadium: Spencer Park

Pre-Season Friendly; 1 June 2010	Brisbane Olympic	0–4	Brisbane Roar	Yeronga
19:15 UTC+10		(Report)	Henrique 8'; Murdocca 17'; Barbarouses 41'; Reinaldo 45'	Stadium: Goodwin Park

Pre-Season Friendly; 8 June 2010	Peninsula Power	0–3	Brisbane Roar	Kippa-Ring
19:15 UTC+10		(Report)	Smith 20'; Reinaldo 30'; McKay 60'	Stadium: A.J. Kelly Park

George Wani Fundraiser; 12 June 2010	African Invitational XI	0–2	Brisbane Roar	Yeronga
19:00 UTC+10		(Report)	Henrique; Murdocca	Stadium: Goodwin Park

Pre-Season Friendly; 20 June 2010	Ipswich Invitational XI	0–5	Brisbane Roar	Ipswich
15:00 UTC+10		(Report)	Brattan; Henrique; McKay; Barbarouses; DeVere	Stadium: QLD Group Stadium; Attendance: 3,500

Pre-Season Friendly; 25 June 2010	Brisbane Roar	2–0	Melbourne Heart	Toowoomba
19:15 UTC+10	Nicholls; McKay	(Report)		Stadium: Clive Berghofer Stadium; Attendance: 2,893

Pre-Season Friendly; 30 June 2010	Sunshine Coast F.C.	1–3	Brisbane Roar	Gympie
19:15 UTC+10	Towle	(Report)	Barbarouses; Henrique; Barbarouses	Stadium: One Mile Ovals

Pre-Season Friendly; 6 July 2010	Brisbane Invitational Xl	2–3	Brisbane Roar	Rochedale
19:05 UTC+10	Shepherd; Waddell	(Report)	Reinaldo; Meyer; Thurtell	Stadium: Underwood Park

Pre-Season Friendly; 10 July 2010	Wellington Phoenix	2–1	Brisbane Roar	Hamilton
14:00 UTC+12	Ifill 17'; MacAllister 25'	(Report)	McKay 79'	Stadium: Waikato Stadium

Pre-Season Friendly; 25 July 2010	Newcastle Jets	0–1	Brisbane Roar	Port Macquarie
14:00 UTC+10		(Report)	Franjic 85' (pen)	Stadium: Port Macquarie Regional Stadium; Referee: Stuart Wolfe

==== Translink Cup ====
On 30 April 2010, Everton FC confirmed on their official website that they would be touring Australia as part of their pre-season for their 2010–11 Premier League campaign. Everton's tour included a match against the Brisbane Roar at Suncorp Stadium on 10 July 2010 where they contested the Translink Cup. The match was later changed to 17 July 2010.

Translink Cup; 17 July 2010	Brisbane Roar	1–2	(England) Everton F.C.	Brisbane
19:30 UTC+10	Barbarouses 66'	Report	Rodwell 48'; Gueye 83'	Stadium: Suncorp Stadium; Attendance: 19,786

=== 2010–11 A-League ===
Round 1 Sunday, 8 August 2010	Gold Coast United	0–0	Brisbane Roar	Gold Coast, Queensland
15:00 UTC+10		(Report) (Summary)		Stadium: Skilled Park; Attendance: 6,394; Referee: Peter Green

Round 2 Saturday, 21 August 2010	Brisbane Roar	1–0	Sydney FC	Brisbane, Queensland
19:30 UTC+10	McKay 53'	(Report) (Summary)		Stadium: Suncorp Stadium; Attendance: 10,339; Referee: Chris Beath

Round 3 Friday, 27 August 2010	Brisbane Roar	1–0	Wellington Phoenix	Brisbane, Queensland
20:00 UTC+10	Barbarouses 73'	(Report) (Summary)		Stadium: Suncorp Stadium; Attendance: 7,339; Referee: Chris Beath

Round 4 Sunday, 5 September 2010	Newcastle Jets	0–0	Brisbane Roar	Newcastle, New South Wales
15:00 UTC+10	(red card) 82' Zadkovich	(Report) (Summary)		Stadium: Energy Australia Stadium; Attendance: 7,066; Referee: Kris Griffiths-Jones

Round 5 Sunday, 12 September 2010	Melbourne Victory	3–0	Brisbane Roar	Melbourne
15:00 UTC+10	Pondeljak 51'; Ricardinho 56'; Brebner 71'	(Report) (Summary)		Stadium: AAMI Park; Attendance: 13,792; Referee: Ryan Shepheard

Round 6 Saturday, 18 September 2010	Brisbane Roar	1–1	Adelaide United	Brisbane, Queensland
19:30 UTC+10	Broich 33'	(Report) (Summary)	Leckie 27'; (red card) 87' Cássio	Stadium: Suncorp Stadium; Attendance: 7,080; Referee: Ben Williams

Round 7 Saturday, 25 September 2010	Brisbane Roar	4–0	Melbourne Heart	Brisbane, Queensland
17:15 UTC+10	Barbarouses 24'; Paartalu 38'; Reinaldo 48' (Pen); Nichols 76'	(Report) (Summary)	(red card) 54' Heffernan	Stadium: Suncorp Stadium; Attendance: 6,342; Referee: Chris Boyle

Round 8 Sunday, 3 October 2010	Perth Glory	1–2	Brisbane Roar	Perth, Western Australia
17:00 UTC+8	Neville 6'	(Report) (Summary)	Reinaldo 2'; Visconte 90+4'	Stadium: NIB Stadium; Attendance: 9,758; Referee: Ben Williams

Round 9 Saturday, 16 October 2010	Brisbane Roar	1–1	Newcastle Jets	Brisbane, Queensland
19:45 UTC+10	Reinaldo 78'	(Report) (Summary)	Smith 18' (o.g.)	Stadium: Suncorp Stadium; Attendance: 10,191; Referee: Jarred Gillett

Round 10; Wednesday, 20 October 2010	Brisbane Roar	2–0	Central Coast Mariners	Brisbane, Queensland
19:00 UTC+10	Broich 21'; Franjic 61'	(Report) (Summary)		Stadium: Suncorp Stadium; Attendance: 5,051; Referee: Chris Beath

Round 11; Saturday, 23 October 2010	Brisbane Roar	2–1	Melbourne Victory	Brisbane, Queensland
19:45 UTC+10	Nichols 26'; J.C. Solórzano 77'	(Report) (Summary)	Kruse 48'	Stadium: Suncorp Stadium; Attendance: 9,425; Referee: Peter Green

Round 12; Saturday, 30 October 2010	Sydney FC	1–1	Brisbane Roar	Sydney
17:15 UTC+11	Brosque 34'	(Report) (Summary)	DeVere 8'	Stadium: Sydney Football Stadium; Attendance: 10,746; Referee: Peter Green

Round 13; Wednesday, 3 November 2010	Wellington Phoenix	1–4	Brisbane Roar	Wellington, New Zealand
19:30 UTC+13	Brown 37'	(Report) (Summary)	Barbarouses 4'; Broich 45'; Murdocca 76'; Nichols 90+2'	Stadium: Westpac Stadium; Attendance: 5,529; Referee: Peter O'Leary

Round 14; Saturday, 6 November 2010	Brisbane Roar	4–0	Adelaide United	Brisbane, Queensland
20:15 UTC+10	Reinaldo 43'; Smith 56'; Barbarouses 62'; Barbarouses 67'; (yellow card) 43' (yellow-red card) 54' Reinaldo	(Report) (Summary)		Stadium: Suncorp Stadium; Attendance: 13,248; Referee: Matthew Breeze

Round 15; Sunday, 14 November 2010	Melbourne Heart	1–2	Brisbane Roar	Melbourne
17:00 UTC+11	Sibon 11'	(Report) (Summary)	Barbarouses 65'; J.C. Solórzano 88'	Stadium: AAMI Park; Attendance: 7,034; Referee: Ryan Shepheard

Round 16; Wednesday, 17 November 2010	Newcastle Jets	1–1	Brisbane Roar	Newcastle, New South Wales
19:30 UTC+11	Kantarovski 54'	(Report) (Summary)	J.C. Solórzano 80'	Stadium: Energy Australia Stadium; Attendance: 7,829; Referee: Peter Green

Round 17; Saturday, 20 November 2010	Brisbane Roar	1–1	North Queensland Fury	Brisbane, Queensland
20:15 UTC+10	Franjic 85'	(Report) (Summary)	Edds 9'	Stadium: Suncorp Stadium; Attendance: 10,126; Referee: Alan Milliner

Round 18; Wednesday, 24 November 2010	Brisbane Roar	3–2	Perth Glory	Brisbane, Queensland
20:00 UTC+10	J.C. Solórzano 41'; Matt Smith 58'; J.C. Solórzano 76' (Pen)	(Report) (Summary)	Fowler 66' (Pen); Pellegrino 83'; (yellow card) 69' (yellow-red card) 75' Neville; (red card) 90+2' Mitchell	Stadium: Suncorp Stadium; Attendance: 6,836; Referee: Matt Gillett

Round 19; Sunday, 28 November 2010	Central Coast Mariners	1–5	Brisbane Roar	Gosford, New South Wales
16:00 UTC+11	Kwasnik 50'; (yellow card) 54' (yellow-red card) 90+3' McBreen	(Report) (Summary)	J.C. Solórzano 8'; J.C. Solórzano 11'; Nichols 24'; Reinaldo 88'; Wilkinson 89' (o.g.)	Stadium: Bluetongue Stadium; Attendance: 5,858; Referee: Ryan Shepheard

Round 20; Friday, 3 December 2010	Melbourne Victory	3–3	Brisbane Roar	Melbourne
20:00 UTC+11	Kruse 63'; Thompson 70'; Kruse 77'	(Report) (Summary)	Kemp 29' (o.g.); J.C. Solórzano 45'; McKay 90+3'	Stadium: AAMI Park; Attendance: 11,886; Referee: Peter Green

Round 21; Sunday, 12 December 2010	Sydney FC	0–1	Brisbane Roar	Sydney
17:00 UTC+11		(Report) (Summary)	Barbarouses 41'	Stadium: Sydney Football Stadium; Attendance: 7,554; Referee: Jarred Gillett

Round 22; Saturday, 18 December 2010	North Queensland Fury	0–2	Brisbane Roar	Townsville, Queensland
20:15 UTC+10		(Report) (Summary)	Barbarouses 7'; Barbarouses 76'	Stadium: Dairy Farmers Stadium; Attendance: 4,412; Referee: Peter Green

Round 23; Sunday, 26 December 2010	Brisbane Roar	2–2	Gold Coast United	Brisbane, Queensland
18:15 UTC+10	Barbarouses 30'; J.C. Solórzano 66' (Pen)	(Report) (Summary)	Djulbic 14'; Robson 55'	Stadium: Suncorp Stadium; Attendance: 13,065; Referee: Chris Beath

Round 24; Sunday, 2 January 2011	Adelaide United	0–1	Brisbane Roar	Adelaide, South Australia
18:30 UTC+10:30		(Report) (Summary)	J.C. Solórzano 69'	Stadium: Hindmarsh Stadium; Attendance: 14,420; Referee: Matthew Breeze

Round 25; Friday, 7 January 2011	Brisbane Roar	1–1	Perth Glory	Brisbane, Queensland
19:30 UTC+10	Nichols 63'	(Report) (Summary)	Sterjovski 31'	Stadium: Suncorp Stadium; Attendance: 11,574; Referee: Jarred Gillett

Round 26; Wednesday, 12 January 2011	Central Coast Mariners	3–3	Brisbane Roar	Gosford, New South Wales
19:30 UTC+11	Kwasnik 37'; Simon 47'; Perez 74' (Pen)	(Report) (Summary)	Paartalu 23'; Broich 65'; Meyer 79'	Stadium: Bluetongue Stadium; Attendance: 7,312; Referee: Peter Green

Round 27; Wednesday, 26 January 2011	Brisbane Roar	2–0	Wellington Phoenix	Gold Coast, Queensland
17:00 UTC+10	Meyer 85'; Meyer 90'	(Report) (Summary)		Stadium: Skilled Park; Attendance: 3,522; Referee: Ryan Shepheard

Round 28; Saturday, 29 January 2011	Brisbane Roar	2–1	Melbourne Heart	Gold Coast, Queensland
16:30 UTC+10	J.C. Solórzano 5'; Meyer 63'	(Report) (Summary)	Sibon 75'	Stadium: Skilled Park; Attendance: 4,213; Referee: Matthew Breeze

Round 29; Tuesday, 8 February 2011	North Queensland Fury	1–2	Brisbane Roar	Gold Coast, Queensland
19:00 UTC+10	Kilian 65'	(Report) (Summary)	Nichols 14'; Henrique 58'	Stadium: Skilled Park; Attendance: Jarred Gillett; Referee: 1,003

Round 30; Saturday, 12 February 2011	Brisbane Roar	4–0	Gold Coast United	Brisbane, Queensland
20:15 UTC+10	Barbarouses 3'; Paartalu 42'; Henrique 66'; Broich 85'	(Report) (Summary)		Stadium: Suncorp Stadium; Attendance: 20,831; Referee: Peter Green

=== Finals series ===
Major SF Leg 1 (Away Leg); Saturday, 19 February 2011	Central Coast Mariners (Australia)	0–2	(Australia) Brisbane Roar	Gosford, New South Wales
19:00 UTC+11		(Report) (Summary)	Barbarouses 52'; McKay 73'	Stadium: Bluetongue Stadium; Attendance: 10,166; Referee: Matthew Breeze

Major SF Leg 2 (Home Leg); Saturday, 26 February 2011	Brisbane Roar (Australia)	2–2	(Australia) Central Coast Mariners	Brisbane, Queensland
19:00 UTC+10	Broich 63'; Henrique 90+1'	(Report) (Summary)	McBreen 39'; Bozanic 40'; Bojic (yellow card) 81' (yellow-red card) 90+3'	Stadium: Suncorp Stadium; Attendance: 25,168; Referee: Peter Green

Brisbane Roar advance to host the grand final by winning the tie 4–2 on aggregate

Grand final Sunday, 13 March 2011	Brisbane Roar (Australia)	2–2 (4–2 p)	(Australia) Central Coast Mariners	Brisbane, Queensland
16:00 UTC+10	Henrique 117'; Paartalu 120'	(Report) (Summary)	Kwasnik 96'; Bozanic 103'	Stadium: Suncorp Stadium; Attendance: 50,168; Referee: Matthew Breeze
	Penalties
	Franjic (penalty scored); Paartalu (penalty scored); McKay (penalty scored); Henrique (penalty scored)		(penalty scored) Hutchinson; (penalty scored) Wilkinson; (penalty missed) McBreen; (penalty missed) Bojic

Brisbane Roar won on Penalties

== Statistics ==
=== Goalscorers ===
Total	Player		Goals per Round																																
Total	Player		1	2	3	4	5	6	7	8	9	10	11	12	13	14	15	16	17	18	19	20	21	22	23	24	25	26	27	28	29	30	SF1	SF2	GF
12	(New Zealand)	Kosta Barbarouses			1				1						1	2	1						1	2	1							1	1		
11	(Costa Rica)	Jean Carlos Solorzano											1				1	1		2	2	1			1	1				1					
6	(Germany)	Thomas Broich						1				1			1													1				1		1	
6	(Australia)	Mitch Nichols							1				1		1						1						1				1				
5	(Brazil)	Reinaldo							1	1	1					1					1														
4	(Australia)	Erik Paartalu							1																			1				1			1
4	(Australia)	James Meyer																										1	2	1					
4	(Brazil)	Henrique																													1	1		1	1
3	(Australia)	Matt McKay		1																		1											1		
2	(Australia)	Ivan Franjic										1							1																
2	(Australia)	Matt Smith														1				1															
2	Goal	Own goal																			1	1													
1	(Australia)	Rocky Visconte								1																									
1	(Australia)	Luke DeVere												1																					
1	(Australia)	Massimo Murdocca													1																				
64	TOTAL		0	1	1	0	0	1	4	2	1	2	2	1	4	4	2	1	1	3	5	3	1	2	2	1	1	3	2	2	2	4	2	2	2

Ivan Franjic, Erik Paartalu, Matt McKay and Henrique scored in the 4–2 Penalty shootout in the grand final

A goal was scored from a penalty kick
Two goals were scored from penalty kicks

== Home attendance ==
Correct as of 13 March 2011 (grand final)
** Denotes midweek fixture

Round	Date	Score	Opponent	Attendance
2	21 August 2010	1–0	Sydney FC	10,339
3	27 August 2010	1–0	Wellington Phoenix	7,339
6	18 September 2010	1–1	Adelaide United	7,080
7	25 September 2010	4–0	Melbourne Heart	6,342
9	16 October 2010	1–1	Newcastle Jets	10,191
10	20 October 2010	2–0	** Central Coast Mariners **	5,051
11	23 October 2010	2–1	Melbourne Victory	9,425
14	6 November 2010	4–0	Adelaide United	13,248
17	20 November 2010	1–1	North Queensland Fury	10,126
18	24 November 2010	3–2	** Perth Glory **	6,836
23	26 December 2010	2–2	Gold Coast United	13,065
25	7 January 2011	1–1	Perth Glory	11,574
27	26 January 2011	2–0	** Wellington Phoenix **	3,522
28	29 January 2011	2–1	Melbourne Heart	4,213
30	12 February 2011	4–0	Gold Coast United	20,831
SF Leg 2	26 February 2011	2–2	Central Coast Mariners	25, 168
GF	13 March 2011	2–2	Central Coast Mariners	50,168
			Total Attendance Before Finals	139,182
			Average Attendance Before Finals	9,279
			Overall Attendance	214,518
			Overall Average Attendance	12,619

== Ladder ==
Pos	Team	Pld	W	D	L	GF	GA	GD	Pts	Qualification
1	Brisbane Roar (C)	30	18	11	1	58	26	+32	65	Qualification for 2012 AFC Champions League group stage and Finals series (Note: First place qualifies for the 2012 AFC Champions League group stage. Winning the 2011 A-League Grand Final automatically earns qualification for the 2012 AFC Champions League group stage, unless first place are champions. Second place qualifies for the 2012 AFC Champions League qualifying play-off, unless they qualify for the 2011 A-League Grand Final alongside first place or become A-League Champions, subsequently third place then qualify for the 2012 AFC Champions League qualifying play-off.)
2	Central Coast Mariners	30	16	9	5	50	31	+19	57	Qualification for 2012 AFC Champions League group stage and Finals series
3	Adelaide United	30	15	5	10	51	36	+15	50	Qualification for 2012 AFC Champions League qualifying play-off and Finals series
4	Gold Coast United	30	12	10	8	40	32	+8	46	Qualification for Finals series
5	Melbourne Victory	30	11	10	9	45	39	+6	43	Qualification for Finals series
6	Wellington Phoenix	30	12	5	13	39	41	−2	41	Qualification for Finals series
7	Newcastle Jets	30	9	8	13	29	33	−4	35	
8	Melbourne Heart	30	8	11	11	32	42	−10	35	
9	Sydney FC	30	8	10	12	35	40	−5	34	
10	Perth Glory	30	5	8	17	27	54	−27	23	
11	North Queensland Fury	30	4	7	19	28	60	−32	19	

Source: ultimatealeague.com
Rules for classification: 1) points; 2) goal difference; 3) number of goals scored.
(C) Champions
