= Thomas Broich =

German footballer (born 1981)

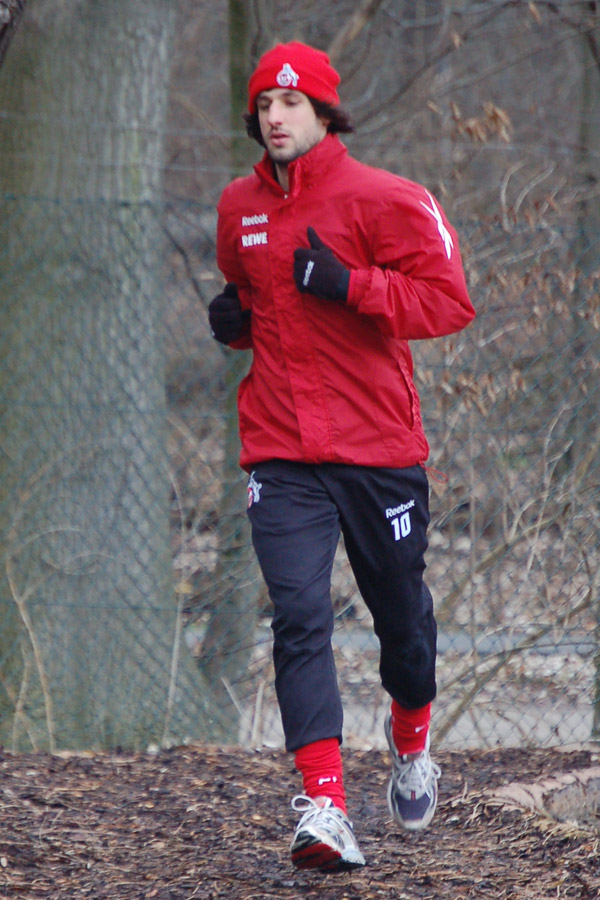
- Broich at training with 1. FC Köln in 2009

Personal information
- Date of birth: 29 January 1981 (age 45)
- Place of birth: Munich, West Germany
- Height: 1.82 m (6 ft 0 in)
- Positions: Attacking midfielder; winger

Youth career
- 1987–1993: ASV Rott am Inn
- 1993–1996: TSV 1860 Rosenheim
- 1996–2000: SpVgg Unterhaching

Senior career*
Years	Team	Apps	(Gls)
2000–2001	SpVgg Unterhaching		
2001–2003	Wacker Burghausen	78	(8)
2004–2006	Borussia Mönchengladbach	68	(4)
2006–2009	1. FC Köln	69	(4)
2009–2010	1. FC Nürnberg	7	(0)
2010–2017	Brisbane Roar	166	(17)
Total		398	(33)

International career
2002–2004	Germany U21	7	(0)
2004–2005	Germany B	2	(0)
- * Club domestic league appearances and goals

Thomas Broich (born 29 January 1981) is a German former professional footballer who played as an attacking midfielder. A SpVgg Unterhaching youth product, Broich went on to play for Wacker Burghausen, Borussia Mönchengladbach, 1. FC Köln, and 1. FC Nürnberg in Germany. In 2010, he moved to Australia joining Brisbane Roar where he spent seven seasons before retiring.

A dual Johnny Warren Medal winner, a three-time A-League Champion, a two time A-League Premier, a two time Gary Wilkins Medal winner and the winner of the 2014 Joe Marston Medal, Broich is considered one of the greatest players in A-League history. With 66 assists, Broich is the leading assister in A-League history.

== Club career ==
=== Germany ===
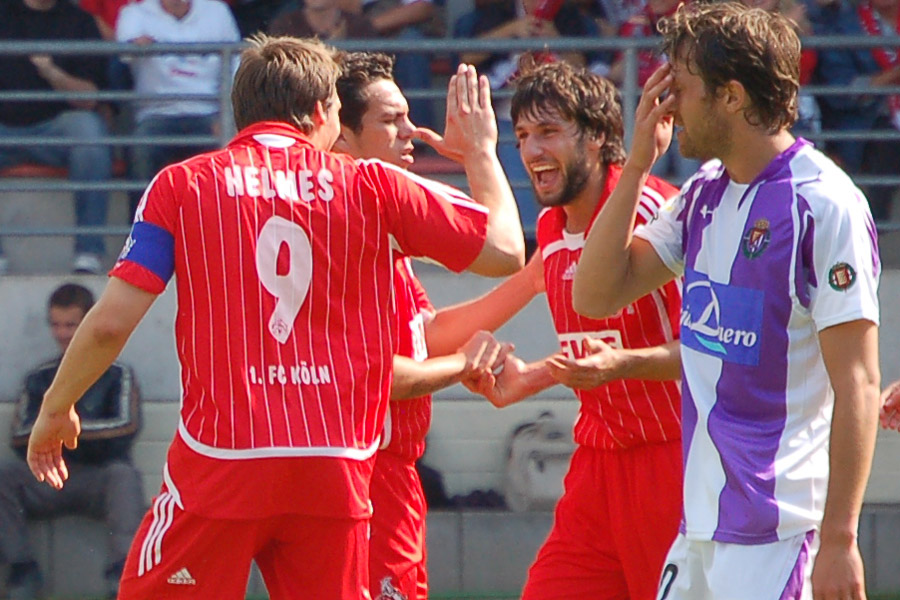
Broich (second from right) celebrates a goal with teammates in 2007

Broich played in several Bavarian youth teams such as ASV Rott am Inn, TSV 1860 Rosenheim and SpVgg Unterhaching. Later he played for the U23 team of Unterhaching and could have earned promotion to the Regionalliga Süd (Then Germany's 3rd league), but the manager did not include him in the first squad so he decided to leave. He signed a contract with SV Wacker Burghausen of the Regionalliga Süd and earned promotion to the 2. Bundesliga in 2002. During this time, he gained the reputation of a "thinking-man's player", being dubbed "Mozart" by his teammates, who often spotted him reading classic German literature and listening to classical music. With Burghausen, he became a standout midfielder and caught the eye of several top Bundesliga teams, including FC Bayern Munich.

In January 2004, he decided to sign with Borussia Mönchengladbach in the Bundesliga. Alongside Bastian Schweinsteiger and Lukas Podolski, Broich was considered to be the "bearer of hope" for the Germany national team and many media sources predicted that he would be a future player for the national team. However, he injured his foot in May 2004 and was unable to participate in the 2004 UEFA European Under-21 Football Championship with the German team. During his injury, he struggled with the pressure to represent his country, drawing comparisons between himself and Sebastian Deisler, another Germany national team player who in 2003 suffered depression as a result of enormous national pressure, eventually retiring from football.

At the start of the 2004–05 season, Mönchengladbach fired manager Holger Fach and hired Dutch coach Dick Advocaat. Broich became a fan favorite and his jersey surged to the top-sold in the club's fan shop. However, Broich clashed on and off the field with his new manager, Advokaat criticising "Mozart's" lack of physicality and free-spirited style, even going as far to sending him down to play with the club's second team. Despite this tough period in the Bundesliga, Broich was called up to participate in the preliminary team for the 2006 World Cup, and after a standout match against Scotland, caught the attention of the national media, including future national team coach Jogi Löw. Advocaat was eventually fired, and Broich, under new trainer Horst Köppel, returned to the starting rotation, playing a large role in helping the team avoid relegation.

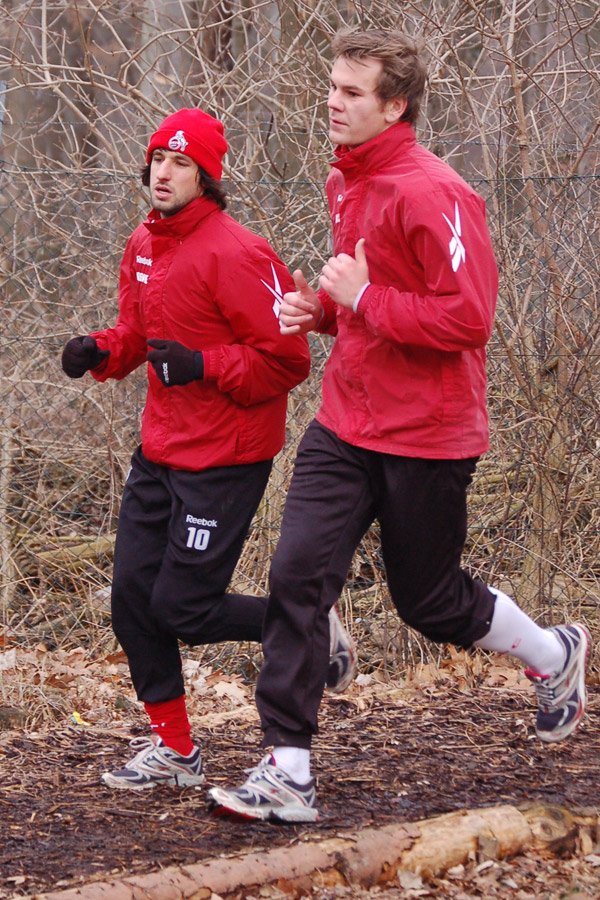
Broich, with Thomas Kessler in 2009

During the season hiatus, Broich found out that his contract with Mönchengladbach would not be extended. Borussia Dortmund were very interested in signing Broich as a replacement for Tomáš Rosický, who had signed with Arsenal. But it was rivals 1. FC Köln, hoping to bolster their squad to gain promotion from the second league to the Bundesliga, who were also strongly interested, who Broich signed with for the 2006–07 season. It was a season of ups and downs, with the highlight being a 4–2 DFB-Pokal win over Schalke 04, who at that time were ranked first in the Bundesliga. Broich scored the deciding goal in the 89th minute. However, back in the Second Bundesliga, he clashed with newly recruited coach Christoph Daum, who he felt was not giving him enough playing time. Köln gained promotion to the Bundesliga, but the relationship between player and coach never improved.

Broich again started to think about playing abroad, attempting to move to the Australian A-League with Adelaide United. However, he was convinced by former Mönchengladbach assistant manager and Broich-fan Michael Oenning, who now had a head coach position with 1. FC Nürnberg, to join him on his new team. Broich signed a one-year contract on 9 June 2009, but, after an early season-injury, he had a slow start and considered giving football in Germany up for good. After only seven season caps, he completed his contract with Nürnberg and again began to look south to Australia.

=== Brisbane Roar ===
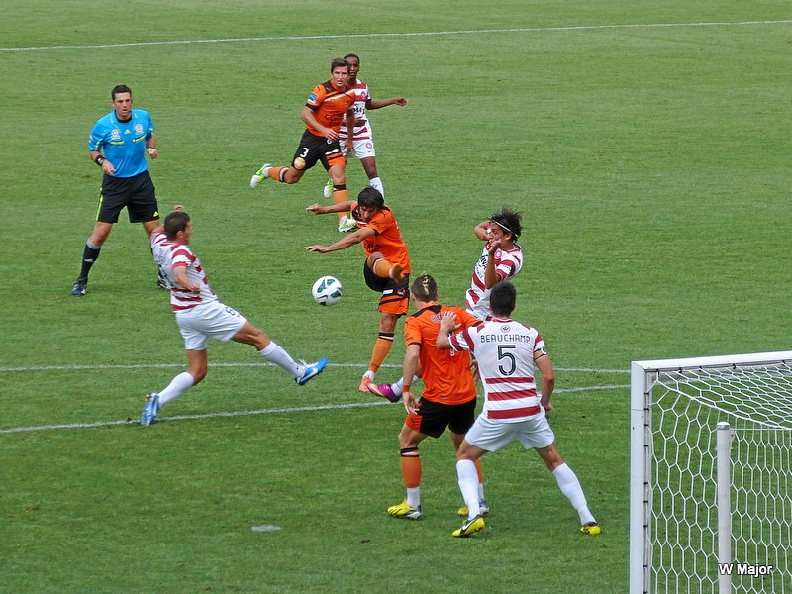
Broich (centre, shooting) in action with Brisbane Roar in 2013

On 11 May 2010, Broich signed a three-year deal with A-League club Brisbane Roar. He made his debut for the club against Everton in a pre-season Translink Cup game. He scored his first goal for the Roar in round seven against Adelaide United. With six goals and 14 assists, Broich was instrumental in his debut season, which saw the Roar win their first ever Premiership and Championship. Broich assisted both of Brisbane's goals in the grand final. It was his corner kick that assisted Erik Paartalu's last minute equaliser to send the final to a penalty shootout.

Broich won the Gary Wilkins Medal, which is awarded to Brisbane Roar's player of the year and was runner up to Marcos Flores for the Johnny Warren Medal, which is awarded to the A-League's player of the year. He finished the 2010–11 season with 12 assists, which was the highest in the league. Broich has only lost two A-League matches while playing for Brisbane, a 3–0 away loss to the Melbourne Victory on 12 September 2010 and a 1–0 home loss to the Newcastle Jets on 28 January 2012. In the 2011–12 season, Broich won the Johnny Warren Medal for player of the year and the A-League Foreign Player of the Year award.

On 10 September 2012, it was announced that Broich had signed a four-year contract extension with the Roar, which means he is contracted to Brisbane until the end of the 2016–17 campaign.

In the Grand Final on 4 May 2014, Broich was named joint Man of the Match along with Iacopo La Rocca as Brisbane came from a goal down to defeat Western Sydney Wanderers 2–1.

On the opening game of the 2014–15 season, Broich netted a free kick opening the scoring for Brisbane, despite eventually going down 2–1 to Adelaide. Brisbane's horrible start to the season was further hampered when Broich was sidelined for six weeks after undergoing ankle surgery. Broich scored again against Adelaide in the elimination final, dispossessing defender Dylan McGowan to level the scores at 1–1. However, Brisbane again went down 2–1.

On 19 April 2017, Broich announced that he would be leaving the Roar at the end of the season, ending a seven-year association with the club.

== Style and influence ==
Broich has exceptional footwork and vision. Since his arrival in Australia, Broich has received praise for his footballing talents, some saying that he is the "best foreigner we've seen" in Australian football. Brisbane coach Ange Postecoglou called Broich one of the best players in the A-League. Broich is highly influential in the Brisbane Roar squad. When missing because of an injury, Roar managed to win only one in eight games, ending their record-breaking undefeated streak of 36 games.

A documentary film about Broich titled Tom Meets Zizou was released to German cinemas in 2011, after eight years in the making.

== Coaching career ==
In August 2017, Broich was appointed an assistant coach of National Premier Leagues Queensland club Brisbane City FC.

In March 2020, Broich and former Roar teammate Jérome Polenz were appointed as coaches of Eintracht Frankfurt's U15 team, with the appointments to take effect from 1 July 2020.

After serving as Head of Methodology at Hertha BSC, Broich was appointed the head of Borussia Dortmund's youth academy.

== International career ==
From 2002 to 2004, Broich played seven times for the Germany U-21. In 2004 and 2005, he was a member of the "Team 2006", a team that gives players a chance to play international friendlies to gain experience for a future in the national squad.

== Career statistics ==
Appearances and goals by club, season and competition
Club	Season	Division	League		Cup (Note: Appearances in DFB-Pokal and FFA Cup)		Continental (Note: Appearances in AFC Champions League)		Other (Note: Appearances in A-League final series)		Total	
Club	Season	Division	Apps	Goals	Apps	Goals	Apps	Goals	Apps	Goals	Apps	Goals
Wacker Burghausen	2001–02	Regionalliga	29	2	–		–		–		29	2
Wacker Burghausen	2002–03	2. Bundesliga	32	3	1	0	–		–		33	3
Wacker Burghausen	2003–04	2. Bundesliga	17	3	1	0	–		–		18	3
Wacker Burghausen	Total		78	8	2	0	–		–		80	8
Borussia Mönchengladbach	2003–04	Bundesliga	13	2	2	0	–		–		15	2
Borussia Mönchengladbach	2004–05	Bundesliga	27	0	1	0	–		–		28	0
Borussia Mönchengladbach	2005–06	Bundesliga	28	2	1	0	–		–		29	2
Borussia Mönchengladbach	Total		68	4	4	0	–		–		72	4
1. FC Köln	2006–07	2. Bundesliga	29	3	3	1	–		–		32	4
1. FC Köln	2007–08	2. Bundesliga	28	1	1	0	–		–		29	1
1. FC Köln	2008–09	Bundesliga	12	0	1	0	–		–		13	0
1. FC Köln	Total		69	4	5	1	–		–		74	5
1. FC Nürnberg	2009–10	Bundesliga	7	0	2	0	–		–		9	0
Brisbane Roar	2010–11	A-League	29	5	–		–		3	1	32	6
Brisbane Roar	2011–12	A-League	17	2	–		6	1	3	1	26	4
Brisbane Roar	2012–13	A-League	27	3	–		1	0	2	0	30	3
Brisbane Roar	2013–14	A-League	27	3	–		–		2	0	29	3
Brisbane Roar	2014–15	A-League	16	1	2	0	5	0	1	1	24	2
Brisbane Roar	2015–16	A-League	27	1	1	0	–		2	1	30	2
Brisbane Roar	2016–17	A-League	23	2	1	0	6	0	2	0	32	2
Brisbane Roar	Total		166	17	4	0	18	1	15	4	203	22
Career total			388	33	17	1	18	1	15	4	438	39

== Honours ==
Brisbane Roar

- A-League Premiership: 2010–11, 2013–14
- A-League Championship: 2010–11, 2011–12, 2013–14

Individual

- Johnny Warren Medal for Player of the Season: 2011–12, 2013–14
- Joe Marston Medal for Player of the Grand Final: 2014
- Gary Wilkins Medal: 2010–11, 2012–13
- A-League Foreign Player of the Year: 2011–12
- A-League Team of the Season: 2010–11, 2011–12, 2013–14
- A-League All Stars: 2013, 2014 (Man of the Match)
- A-League PFA Team of the Decade: 2005–2015

Individual records

- Most Johnny Warren Medal Awards: 2
