= Translink Cup =

- Founded: 2007
- Region: Australia
- Current champions: (England) Everton (1st title)
- Most championships: Brisbane Roar (2 titles)
- 2010 Translink Cup

The Translink Cup, also known as the Roar Against Racism Trophy, was an Australian association football invitational trophy contested in an annual charity friendly match hosted by Brisbane Roar of the A-League. It was held at Suncorp Stadium, and was often used as a pre-season match for both teams to warm them up for the regular season. The friendly also served to promote the decline of racism on the football pitch. All proceeds from the match went to the anti-racism charity Kick It Out; a donation was also made by TransLink, who sponsored and had naming rights to the cup.

== Competition ==
The competition was little known for the first 2 years of format with Queensland Roar booking under-rated overseas teams such as Supersport United with the game pulling only just over 12,000 fans into Suncorp Stadium. The competition got major media publicity in 2009 when talk of English Premier League clubs Fulham or Everton would tour to Brisbane to play against Queensland Roar in the Translink Cup. But original plans for Queensland to play Fulham were scrapped after the team went into a financial crisis. The 2009 version was then locked in with Scottish Premier League club Celtic for 12 July. The Game was a huge success after new Celtic Manager Tony Mowbray decided to use the game as a warm-up for UEFA Champions League qualifiers and bring many of his first team squad to Brisbane, this included Polish international goalkeeper Artur Boruc, former Barcelona player Marc Crosas, former Manchester City star and Greek international striker Georgios Samaras, Andreas Hinkel who has been capped by Germany 19 times, Scottish international Shaun Maloney and the team was captained by Australian Star Scott McDonald. Brisbane were eventually overpowered by the Scottish giants 3-0 with New Zealand International Chris Killen picking up the Man of the Match award after scoring a double in quick succession. The match was also notable as 3 Brisbane Roar players (Craig Moore, Charlie Miller and Bob Malcolm) had previously played for Rangers for a combined total of 483 appearances. Over 31,000 people from around the globe turned up to the match, with many of the 31,000 Celtic supporters.

=== 2007 ===
The inaugural translink cup was fought between Queensland Roar and Supersport United at Suncorp Stadium, the game started off at a high tempo with Simon Lynch creating a close-range shot only to be saved by the keeper, Reinaldo eventually opened the scoring in the 12th minute after a low header from a corner, he doubled the home sides lead in the 37 minute after dazzling footwork to get past a back. Mashego gave Supersport an almost instant reply with a low and fast shot into the bottom corner of the net in the 39th minute. By Half-Time Queensland Roar were the better team. Queensland came back scoring 7 minutes into the second half through prolific striker Simon Lynch. Mashego came close to scoring a double in the 63rd minute after his shot hit the crossbar, Queensland Roar finished off the scoring in the 70th minute through newly signed youth player Tahj Minniecon. Queensland Roar 4, Supersport United 1.

Facts:

- This was Tahj Minniecon's first game in Queensland Roar colours
- Queensland Roar won their first Translink Cup
- This was Queensland Roar first major or minor silverware
- Reinaldo was awarded the man of the match award

=== 2008 ===
Queensland Roars Against Racism clash started with both Matt McKay and Serginho van Dijk going close to scoring in the opening 20 minutes before Smits opened the scoring on 35 minutes. The youngster outjumped Fabio to meet Hyuk-Su Seo's cross and drilled the football past the keeper. Frank Farina's men responded with McKay doubling the lead just before the break. Palmeiras youngster Portela found the bottom corner of the roar's goal through a free kick in the 57th minute. Palmeiras had a goal ruled out on 62 minutes with Valdivia ruled offside as he turned in a free kick from Portela. Farina made changes after the goal, bringing on Robbie Kruse and Scottish trialist Charlie Miller. Five minutes from the end Miller went close with a volley thudding against the crossbar. But the former Scottish international showed his ability as a provider, beating two defenders before teeing up Murdocca to thump home the third goal in injury time. Queensland Roar 3, Palmeiras B 1

Facts:

- This was Charlie Miller's and Serginho van Dijk's debut game for the Roar
- Queensland Roar win their second Translink Cup
- Portela from Palmeiras B was awarded the man of the match award

=== 2009 ===
Celtic Manager Tony Mowbray decided to use the game as a warm-up for European Champions League qualifiers and brought a near full-strength squad for the fixture, including Artur Boruc, Lee Naylor, Stephen McManus, Gary Caldwell, Massimo Donati, Marc Crosas, Georgios Samaras, Andreas Hinkel, Shaun Maloney and Scott McDonald.

The game started fast and furious and it looked as though Brisbane Roar could overcome the Glasgow giants with Brisbane youngster, Robbie Kruse having 3 shots in the opening 10 minutes that force Celtic goalkeeper Artur Boruc into making many acrobatic saves. Celtic also forced Brisbane Roar goalkeeper Liam Reddy also made two noticeable saves in the first 30 minutes. The pace of the game eventually eased up after the half-hour mark and Celtic took advantage of this with New Zealand international Chris Killen scoring from a header in the 39th minute. He managed to get his second only 2 minutes later with a low shot going under Liam Reddy. At half-time Scottish trialist Bob Malcolm came on to the pitch where he showed glimpses of his ability with the former Rangers man making a few good tackles to break up play. Japanese international Koki Mizuno came on at half time along with Georgios Samaras. Mizuno made an almost instant impact scoring with a powerful header in the 50th minute to seal the win for Celtic. Another high point of the game for Celtic fans was when Marc-Antoine Fortune came onto the field in the 70th minute to make his debut for Celtic after recently signing for the club from FC Nancy for £3.5 million. Celtic controlled the game for majority of the second half limiting Brisbane Roar to only one shot on goal. The game ended after one minute of injury time and a minor injury to Celtic youngster Milan Misun. Celtic FC 3, Brisbane Roar 0.

Facts:

- Bob Malcolm and Luke Brattan made their debuts for Brisbane Roar
- Celtic FC won their first Translink Cup
- Chris Killen won the man of the match award
- This was Tony Mowbray's first game as manager of Celtic
- Marc-Antoine Fortune made his debut for Celtic
- The match broke the record for highest attendance at a Translink Cup Match
- It is also notable as 3 Brisbane Roar players (Craig Moore, Charlie Miller and Bob Malcolm) had previously played for Rangers - Celtic's arch rivals in Scotland - for a combined total of 483 appearances.

=== 2010 ===
Everton's third game on tour in Australia included Jermaine Beckford's first start for the blues. Jack Rodwell scored his second goal of the tour to give Everton the lead four minutes into the second half. The Toffees appeared to be in cruise control until Roar substitute Kosta Barbarouses equalised in the 66th minute. But Magaye Gueye turned in Jose Baxter's tantalising cross from close range seven minutes from time.

=== 2011 ===
It was announced by the Roar on 5 July that the club would not be playing an overseas team in a match for the Translink Cup and have never played for the cup since.

== Results ==
=== Match ===
==== 2007 ====
1 July 2007
20:00 UTC+10

Queensland Roar	4 – 1	(South Africa) Supersport United
Reinaldo 12', 37'; Lynch 52'; Minniecon 70'		Mashego 39'

Suncorp Stadium
Brisbane, Queensland
Attendance: 12,000+
Referee: Matthew Breeze

==== 2008 ====
12 July 2008
19:00 UTC+10

Queensland Roar	3 – 1	(Brazil) Palmeiras B
Smits 35'; McKay 43'; Murdocca 90+2'	(Report)	Portela 57'

Suncorp Stadium
Brisbane, Queensland
Attendance: 12,841
Referee: Peter Green

==== 2009 ====
12 July 2009
19:00 UTC+10

Brisbane Roar	0 – 3	(Scotland) Celtic
	(Report)	Killen 39', 41'; Mizuno, 50'

Suncorp Stadium
Brisbane, Queensland
Attendance: 31,340
Referee: Peter Green

==== 2010 ====
10 July 2010
19:00 UTC+10

Brisbane Roar	1 – 2	(England) Everton
Barbarouses 66'		Rodwell 49'; Gueye 83'

Suncorp Stadium
Brisbane, Queensland
Attendance: 19,786

=== Summaries ===
Year	Crowd	Match		
Year	Crowd	Home team	Score	Away team
2007; Details	12,000+	(Australia) Queensland Roar	4–1	(South Africa) Supersport United
2008; Details	12,841	(Australia) Queensland Roar	3–1	(Brazil) Palmeiras B
2009; Details	31,430	(Australia) Brisbane Roar	0-3	(Scotland) Celtic
2010; Details	19,786	(Australia) Brisbane Roar	1-2	(England) Everton
