= Ivan Franjic =

Australian association football player (born 1987)

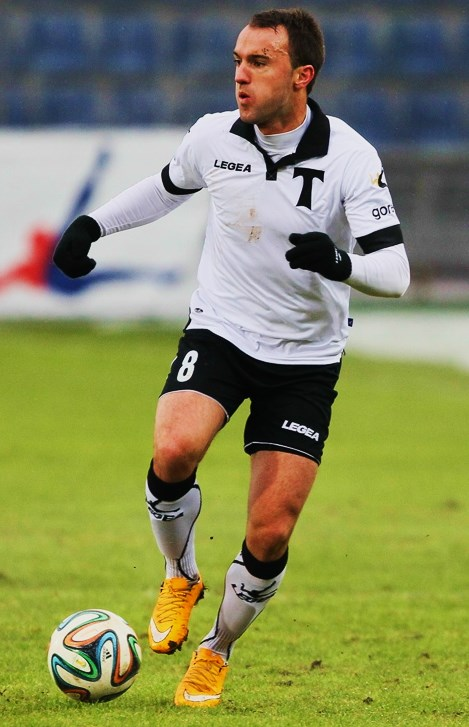
- Franjic playing for Torpedo Moscow in 2014

Personal information
- Full name: Ivan Frankie Franjic
- Date of birth: 10 September 1987 (age 39)
- Place of birth: Melbourne, Victoria, Australia
- Height: 1.80 m (5 ft 11 in)

Team information
- Current team: Whittlesea United (head coach)

Senior career*
| Years | Team | Apps | (Gls) |
| 2005–2006 | St Albans Saints | 39 | (5) |
| 2007–2008 | Melbourne Knights | 50 | (9) |
| 2009 | Oakleigh Cannons | 17 | (2) |
| 2009–2014 | Brisbane Roar | 115 | (11) |
| 2014–2015 | Torpedo Moscow | 4 | (0) |
| 2015–2017 | Melbourne City | 39 | (1) |
| 2017 | Daegu FC | 2 | (0) |
| 2017–2018 | Brisbane Roar | 16 | (2) |
| 2018–2020 | Perth Glory | 53 | (4) |
| 2020–2021 | Macarthur FC | 19 | (0) |
| 2021 | George Cross | 1 | (0) |
| 2022 | Heidelberg United | 21 | (2) |
| 2023–2024 | Melbourne Knights | 43 | (4) |
| 2025–2026 | Uni Hill Eagles | 40 | (6) |
| Total | | 447 | (45) |

International career^{‡}
| 2012–2015 | Australia | 20 | (0) |

Managerial career
- 2024–2025: Melbourne Knights
- 2026–: Whittlesea United
Medal record
Representing Australia
Men's Association football
AFC Asian Cup
| Winner | 2015 Australia |
- * Club domestic league appearances and goals as of 5 September 2026 ‡ National team caps and goals as of 4 September 2015

Ivan Frankie Franjic (croatian:Franjić) (born 10 September 1987) is a former Australian soccer player, who last played rightback for Uni Hill Eagles in the Victorian State League 2 North-West He currently a head coach for Whittlesea United in Victoria Premier League 2.

== Club career ==
=== Victorian Premier League ===
Franjic played at Junior level for Meadow Park Eagles, Melbourne Knights, and St Albans Saints. During the 2005 season he made his senior debut for the Saints, playing 39 times for a reward of five goals. He then moved back to his former Youth club Melbourne Knights where he played 50 times, scoring nine goals. After the 2008 season he moved to Oakleigh Cannons where his performances would soon earn him a move to the A-League with Brisbane Roar. Due to the Victorian Premier League being a semi-professional league, Franjic also was employed as a Carpenter.

=== Brisbane Roar ===
On 31 August 2009, he was signed as a short-term injury replacement for Andrew Packer. After being signed on loan to Brisbane he was signed on a long-term contract. During his first season in the A-League he made a combined 20 appearances for the club.

Franjic scored his first goal for Brisbane in a pre-season friendly against the Newcastle Jets on 2 July 2010. His 85th-minute penalty was the match-winning goal, with the Roar winning 1–0. His first A-League goal for Brisbane came in the Round 10, midweek clash with Central Coast Mariners at Suncorp Stadium with a powerful volley from outside of the box. His goal was made famous for his team's "human kayak" celebration. Brisbane won the game 2–0. Playing as a wingback, Franjic impressed at the Roar.

In Round 17, Franjic scored an equalising goal against the North Queensland Fury in the 85th minute. The game ended 1–1. This goal meant that the Roar continued their undefeated run, extending it to 12 matches. Franjic played at right-back for the Brisbane Roar in the 2011 A-League Grand Final. The Roar were down 2–0 in extra time against the Central Coast Mariners before scoring two goals in under four minutes to send the match to a penalty shoot-out. Franjic scored the first penalty for the Roar who ended up winning 4–2 in the shootout after two saves from Michael Theoklitos.

Franjic was one of six Brisbane Roar players to be selected in the All-Star Team for the 2010–11 season. Goal.com named Franjic as one of five Australian defenders in the A-League who are ready to play in Europe.

In 2011, Franjic produced a foul throw against home team Sydney FC. This event produced much laughter from the home fans.

In 2012, Franjic played in the 2012 A-League Grand Final against Perth Glory, where he scored an own goal to give Perth an unlikely lead. Brisbane managed to claw back and take the lead courtesy a late penalty by Besart Berisha, becoming the first A-League side to win the championship two years in succession.

=== Torpedo Moscow ===
In August 2014, Franjic moved to newly promoted Russian Premier League side FC Torpedo Moscow, signing a three-year contract at the club. Franjic made his debut for Torpedo on 25 October 2014, in a 0–0 home draw against FC Kuban Krasnodar, coming on as a half-time substitute for Ivan Novoseltsev. During January 2015 Torpedo blocked a loan move for Franjic back to the A-League, with Franjic later being linked with a move to Dinamo Zagreb during the summer of 2015. He quit Torpedo Moscow due to unpaid wages on 23 April 2015.

=== Melbourne City ===
Just over a month after leaving Russia, Franjic was unveiled as A-League side Melbourne City's first signing of the summer. Signing a three-year deal, Franjic expressed his pleasure at returning to his home town, and cited the prospect of first team football as a key factor in his decision to join City, particularly in light of his desire to retain his place in the Socceroos starting line-up.

=== Daegu FC ===
After two injury-plagued seasons at Melbourne City, Franjic was released from the third year of his contract to allow him to join South Korean club Daegu FC. Franjic announced that he was leaving the club in October 2017, having made just two K League Classic appearances.

=== Return to Brisbane Roar ===
Franjic returned to Brisbane Roar on a one-season contract in November 2017. On his second appearance for Brisbane Roar after joining he scored a left foot curled effort after two minutes on the pitch to claim a 2–0 win over Western Sydney Wanderers. At the end of the season, he refused Brisbane Roar's offer to re-sign him.

=== Perth Glory ===
On 31 May 2018, following his release from Brisbane Roar, Franjic signed for fellow A-League club, Perth Glory on a two-year deal.

=== Macarthur FC ===
In September 2020, Franjic signed with Macarthur FC for their inaugural season.

=== Return to Melbourne Knights ===
On 3 November 2022, Franjic and his brother Joseph agreed to join Melbourne Knights for the 2023 season.

== International career ==
In December 2012, Franjic made his international debut for the Socceroos under Holger Osieck.

In the 2014 FIFA World Cup in Brazil he started at right back in Australia's 3–1 loss to Chile. At the 35th minute he crossed to Tim Cahill who scored Australia's only goal in the game. Franjic later succumbed to a hamstring injury and was substituted in the second half. He was later ruled out of the remainder of the tournament to his bitter disappointment.

Franjic was named as part of Australia's squad for the 2015 AFC Asian Cup. Franjic started in Australia's first match of the tournament against Kuwait, playing the full 90 minutes and providing the assist for Massimo Luongo to score Australia's second goal of the match.

Franjic started for Australia in the 2015 AFC Asian Cup Final. However, after suffering an injury in the middle of the second half, Franjic was substituted off for Matt McKay as Australia won 2–1.

Away from football, Franjic was completing a carpentry apprenticeship before deciding to pursue a professional football career.

== Career statistics ==
As of match played 13 April 2015

| Club performance | | | League | | Cup | | Continental | | Total | |
| Season | Club | League | Apps | Goals | Apps | Goals | Apps | Goals | Apps | Goals |
|---|---|---|---|---|---|---|---|---|---|---|
| 2009–10 | Brisbane Roar | A-League | 19 | 0 | – | | – | | 19 | 0 |
| 2010–11 | Brisbane Roar | A-League | 23 | 2 | – | | – | | 23 | 2 |
| 2011–12 | Brisbane Roar | A-League | 29 | 1 | – | | 6 | 0 | 35 | 1 |
| 2012–13 | Brisbane Roar | A-League | 23 | 3 | – | | 1 | 0 | 24 | 3 |
| 2013–14 | Brisbane Roar | A-League | 21 | 5 | – | | – | | 21 | 5 |
| 2014–15 | Torpedo Moscow | Russian Premier League | 4 | 0 | 1 | 0 | – | | 5 | 0 |
| 2015–16 | Melbourne City FC | A-League | 0 | 0 | 0 | 0 | – | | 0 | 0 |
| Total | Australia | | 115 | 11 | – | | 7 | 0 | 122 | 11 |
| Total | Russia | | 4 | 0 | 1 | 0 | – | | 5 | 0 |
| Career total | | | 119 | 11 | 1 | 0 | 7 | 0 | 127 | 11 |

== Honours ==
=== Player ===
Brisbane Roar

- A-League Premiership: 2010–11, 2013–14
- A-League Championship: 2010–11, 2011–12, 2013–14

Melbourne City

- FFA Cup: 2016

Perth Glory

- A-League: Premiers 2018–19

Australia

- AFC Asian Cup: 2015

=== Individual ===
- PFA A-League Team of the Season: 2010–11, 2013–14
- PFA A-League Team of the Decade: 2005–15
