= 2011 A-League Grand Final =

- Event: 2010–11 A-League
Brisbane Roar	Central Coast Mariners
2	2
- After extra time Brisbane won 4–2 on penalties
- Date: 13 March 2011
- Venue: Suncorp Stadium, Brisbane
- Man of the Match: Mathew Ryan, Central Coast Mariners
- Referee: Matthew Breeze
- Attendance: 50,168

The 2011 A-League Grand Final was the sixth A-League Grand Final taking place on 13 March 2011 at Suncorp Stadium. It was the final match in the A-League 2010–11 season, played between premiers Brisbane Roar and runners-up Central Coast Mariners.

== Route to the final ==
Elimination finals
3	Adelaide United	1
6	Wellington Phoenix	0
4	Gold Coast United	1
5	Melbourne Victory	0

Semifinals
1	Brisbane Roar (agg.)	2	2
2	Central Coast Mariners	0	2
Adelaide United	2
Gold Coast United	3

Preliminary final
Central Coast Mariners	1
Gold Coast United	0

Grand final
Brisbane Roar (pen.)	2 (4)
Central Coast Mariners	2 (2)

== Match ==
=== Summary ===
In front of a crowd of 50,168, a record for both Brisbane Roar and football in Brisbane, the home side lifted their first A-League title after a match that was decided in a penalty shoot-out.

Both teams had periods of quality possession and created chances; however, the game remained scoreless going into halftime. Brisbane Roar midfielder Mitch Nichols went closest for the home side in the first half, hitting the crossbar following a corner from Thomas Broich. Central Coast Mariners captain Alex Wilkinson came closest for the Gosford side only for the ball to be cleared off the line by the opposing captain, Matt McKay.

For the majority of the second half, the Mariners were put under a lot of pressure as the Roar pushed forward searching for a goal, forcing Mariners goalkeeper Mathew Ryan into a number of saves. The Mariners defended resiliently and were able to exert some pressure of their own through young substitute Bernie Ibini-Isei, whose shot was saved by Roar goalkeeper Michael Theoklitos. Ibini-Isei was nearly put through one-on-one with Theoklitos in the dying seconds of the second half, only for referee Matthew Breeze to whistle for the end of 90 minutes just as the pass to Ibini-Isei was played. As the scores were deadlocked at 90 minutes with both teams failing to grasp their chances, the match was destined for extra time.

Central Coast started the first half of extra time the better of the two sides and were threatening the Brisbane goal. This pressure brought reward for the Mariners in the 96th minute, with Ibini-Isei winning a corner after Theoklitos could only deflect the young strikers' shot behind. The resulting corner saw a Mariners' header well saved by Theoklitos, only for the ball to land in front of striker Adam Kwasnik, who scored the first goal of the game despite the efforts of Matt McKay on the goal line. Seven minutes later, Kwasnik was the provider for the Mariners' second goal of the game. After being put through on goal with only Theoklitos to beat, Kwasnik had his shot blocked, however the striker managed to regain the ball and pass to an unmarked Oliver Bozanic who managed to score despite efforts on goal line from the Roar defence.

As the first half of extra time ended, the Roar appeared beaten, with the Mariners holding what appeared to be a comfortable two-goal lead into the final period of the game. In contrast to the start of the first half of extra time, the Roar were the ones pushing forward as they chased a goal that would give them hope. Their reward came three minutes from full-time. Roar captain, Matt McKay's lobbed pass to Jean Carlos Solórzano, whose first time chest control gave him space he needed to find a pass to Thomas Broich who set up Henrique to side-foot the ball into the Mariners' goal. The Roar then sensationally equalised with barely seconds to go through Roar midfielder Erik Paartalu. Young Roar substitute Rocky Visconte won a corner for the Roar when Mariners substitute striker Daniel McBreen's clearance went behind the goals. Thomas Broich's corner was met by Paartalu's strong header which completed the comeback and sent the game to a penalty shootout.

The shootout was taken in front of the Brisbane Roar home end, with the Central Coast Mariners to take the first penalty kick. Veteran Mariners' and Maltese international midfielder, John Hutchinson took the first kick, which he converted, taking a deflection off Roar goalkeeper Michael Theoklitos. Brisbane Roar right back Ivan Franjic stepped up first for the Roar and duly converted his penalty, sending Mariners' goalkeeper the wrong way. Mariners' captain Alex Wilkinson and the Roar's goalscoring hero Erik Paartalu both converted their penalty kicks taking the score to 2-2. Mariners' striker Daniel McBreen then struck his shot well to the right of Theoklitos; however, the Roar goalkeeper was equal to it and palmed the shot around the post. Roar captain Matt McKay then took his penalty successfully, giving the Roar a 3–2 advantage. Right back Pedj Bojic took the Mariners' fourth penalty kick. Bojic's powerful strike looked destined for the top left-hand corner of Theoklitos' goal; however, the three-time A-League Goalkeeper of the Year pulled off a one-handed save to palm the ball over the bar and deny the Mariners for a second time in the shootout. With the score at 3–2 and the Roar still having two penalty kicks in hand, this meant that the next penalty kick for the Roar would be enough. Brisbane's Brazilian winger Henrique stepped up and converted his penalty kick, beating the Mariners' keeper and Joe Marston Medalist Mathew Ryan to seal Brisbane Roar's first ever A-League Championship.

=== Details ===
13 March 2011
Sunday 16:00 EST

Brisbane Roar	2–2 (a.e.t.)	Central Coast Mariners
Henrique 117'; Paartalu 120'	Reports	Kwasnik 96'; Bozanic 103'
Penalties
Franjic (penalty scored); Paartalu (penalty scored); McKay (penalty scored); Henrique (penalty scored)	4–2	(penalty scored) Hutchinson; (penalty scored) Wilkinson; (penalty missed) McBreen; (penalty missed) Bojić

Suncorp Stadium
Attendance: 50,168
Referee: Matthew Breeze

Brisbane Roar	Central Coast Mariners

GK	1	(Australia) Michael Theoklitos
RB	5	(Australia) Ivan Franjic
CB	2	(Australia) Matt Smith
CB	23	(Australia) Milan Susak		(substituted off) 102'
LB	4	(Australia) Shane Stefanutto
DM	6	(Australia) Erik Paartalu	120'
CM	17	(Australia) Mitch Nichols		(substituted off) 82'
CM	15	(Australia) Matt McKay (c)
RW	7	(New Zealand) Kosta Barbarouses		(substituted off) 71'
LW	22	(Germany) Thomas Broich
CF	9	(Costa Rica) Jean Carlos Solórzano
Substitutes:
MF	8	(Australia) Massimo Murdocca		(substituted on) 82'
FW	10	(Brazil) Henrique	117'	(substituted on) 71'
DF	12	(Australia) Matt Mundy
FW	14	(Australia) Rocky Visconte		(substituted on) 102'
GK	20	(Australia) Andrew Redmayne
Manager:
(Australia) Ange Postecoglou

GK	20	(Australia) Mathew Ryan
RB	4	(Australia) Pedj Bojić
CB	18	(Australia) Alex Wilkinson (c)
CB	6	(Netherlands) Patrick Zwaanswijk
LB	3	(Australia) Joshua Rose
DM	8	(Australia) Rostyn Griffiths		(substituted off) 89'
CM	14	(New Zealand) Michael McGlinchey
CM	11	(Australia) Oliver Bozanic	103'
AM	22	(Australia) Mustafa Amini		(substituted off) 60'
CF	19	(Australia) Matt Simon		(substituted off) 72'
CF	23	(Australia) Adam Kwasnik	96'
Substitutes:
FW	2	(Australia) Daniel McBreen		(substituted on) 72'
MF	7	(Malta) John Hutchinson		(substituted on) 60'
DF	16	(Australia) Trent Sainsbury
FW	24	(Australia) Bernie Ibini-Isei		(substituted on) 89'
GK	30	(Australia) Paul Henderson
Manager:
(Australia) Graham Arnold

Joe Marston Medal:
Mathew Ryan (Central Coast Mariners)

Assistant referees:
Ben Wilson
Brad Hobson
Fourth official:
Strebre Delovski

Match rules

- 90 minutes
- 30 minutes of extra time if necessary.
- Penalty shoot-out if scores still level.

=== Statistics ===
	Brisbane	Central Coast
Attempts at goal	21	15
Attempts on target	12	7
Attempts off target	8	8
Attempts - woodwork	1	0
Keeper saves	1	7
Ball possession	57%	43%
Corners	11	6
Fouls committed	4	11
Offsides	1	4
Yellow cards	0	0
Red cards	0	0

== See also ==
- 2010–11 A-League
- List of A-League champions
