= Jean Carlos Solórzano =

Costa Rican footballer (born 1988)

Personal information
- Full name: Jean Carlos Solórzano Madrigal
- Date of birth: 8 January 1988 (age 38)
- Place of birth: Nicoya, Costa Rica
- Height: 1.80 m (5 ft 11 in)
- Position: Forward

Team information
- Current team: Brisbane Strikers
- Number: 29

Senior career*
Years	Team	Apps	(Gls)
2005–2013	Alajuelense	67	(21)
2010–2011	→ Brisbane Roar (loan)	25	(11)
2011–2012	→ Melbourne Victory (loan)	14	(0)
2013	Puntarenas	4	(0)
2014–2016	Brisbane Roar	36	(6)
2016	Rochedale Rovers	5	(0)
2017	St Albans Saints	12	(0)
2017	Municipal Liberia	17	(4)
2018–2019	Lions FC	17	(4)
2019–2020	Brisbane City	31	(22)
2020	Gold Coast Knights	3	(0)
2020–2023	Lions FC	72	(24)
2023–	Brisbane Strikers	5	(0)

International career^{‡}
2003–2005	Costa Rica U-17	9	(3)
2006–2007	Costa Rica U-20	11	(4)
2012	Costa Rica	1	(0)
- * Club domestic league appearances and goals as of 30 July 2023 ‡ National team caps and goals as of 29 October 2010

Jean Carlos Solórzano Madrigal (born 8 January 1988) is a Costa Rican footballer who plays as a forward for Brisbane Strikers in the Football Queensland Premier League. He officially became an Australian citizen in 2020.

== Club career ==
He made his official debut with the Alajuelense first team during the 2005–06 season, on 14 December, against Santacruceña, with only 17 years, and played 29 minutes for his team. He was the top scorer for his team in the 2006–07 season, scoring eight goals in 17 games.

=== Brisbane Roar ===
It was announced that he had signed with Australian A-League club Brisbane Roar on-loan for a year from Alajuelense. Solorzano impressed at Brisbane, scoring 11 goals. Solorzano went on to win the 2011 A-League Grand Final in stunning fashion against Central Coast Mariners. Solorzano stated that he wanted to stay at the Roar.

=== Melbourne Victory ===
It was announced on 28 March 2011 that Melbourne Victory signed Solorzano from Brisbane Roar, with Alajuelense extending his loan deal for one more season so that the move could take place. Solorzano failed to make an impact at Melbourne due to limited game-time, and returned to Costa Rica at the end of the season.

=== Puntarenas ===
Solórzano signed with Puntarenas in June 2013.

=== Return to Brisbane Roar ===
On 29 January 2014 Solórzano re-signed with the club that he won Premiership and Championship medals with in 2010–11. He has initially signed on until the end of the 2013–14 season following a successful week-long trial. It took him almost a year to score his first Brisbane Roar goals scoring a brace against the Central Coast Mariners. Solórzano then scored 6 goals in his next 7 games.

On 29 April 2016, following an injury-riddled season, Solórzano was released by Brisbane Roar.

=== Rochedale Rovers ===
Solórzano joined Rochedale in June 2016, ahead of their FFA Cup match against Redlands United.

=== St Albans Saints ===
In January 2017, Solorzano joined St Albans Saints ahead of their 2017 National Premier Leagues Victoria season.

== International career ==
Solórzano has represented Costa Rica at U-17 level, was part of the Costa Rican 2005 FIFA U-17 World Championship squad as well as the 2007 FIFA U-20 World Cup squad.

He made his senior debut for Costa Rica in an April 2012 friendly match against Honduras, coming on as a substitute for Olman Vargas.

== Honors ==
=== Club ===
Brisbane Roar:

- A-League Premiership: 2010–2011, 2013–14
- A-League Championship: 2010–2011, 2013–14

Lions FC

- National Premier Leagues Queensland Premiership: 2018
- National Premier Leagues Queensland Championship: 2018

=== Individual ===
- A-League PFA Team of the Season: 2010–11
