= Chris Bush (Australian soccer) =

Australian footballer

Christopher Bush
Personal information
- Full name: Christopher Anthony Bush
- Date of birth: 13 February 1992 (age 34)
- Place of birth: Goulburn, Australia
- Height: 1.66 m (5 ft 5 1/2 in)
- Position: Central midfielder

Youth career
- Southern Tabelands SA
- Woden Valley
- ACTAS
- 2009–2010: AIS
- 2010–2012: Brisbane Roar FC

Senior career*
Years	Team	Apps	(Gls)
2010–2012	Brisbane Roar FC	1	(0)
2012	Blacktown Spartans FC	10	(0)
2013	Dapto Dandaloo Fury	5	(3)

International career
2007–2009	Australia U-17	15	(0)
2010–2011	Australia U-20	4	(0)
- * Club domestic league appearances and goals

Christopher Bush (born 13 February 1992) is an Australian footballer who plays for Dapto Dandaloo Fury.

== Club career ==
Bush was promoted to the Brisbane Roar senior team after Reinaldo departed the club in order to meet the 20 player minimum imposed on A-League clubs.

== Career statistics ==
(Correct as of 29 December 2013)

Club	Season	League		Finals		Continental		International		Total	
Club	Season	Apps	Goals	Apps	Goals	Apps	Goals	Apps	Goals	Apps	Goals
Brisbane Roar	2010–11	1	0	0	0	0	0	0	0	1	0
Total		1	0	0	0	0	0	0	0	1	0

== Honours ==
With Australia:

- AFF U-19 Youth Championship: 2010
- AFF U-16 Youth Championship: 2008
