= Patrick Theodore =

Australian soccer player

Personal information
- Full name: Patrick Samuel Theodore
- Date of birth: 16 May 1996 (age 30)
- Place of birth: Brisbane, Queensland, Australia
- Height: 1.73 m (5 ft 8 in)
- Position: Forward

Team information
- Current team: Northstar Football Club

Youth career
- Wynnum District
- Wynnum Wolves FC
- 2012–2013: Brisbane Roar

Senior career*
Years	Team	Apps	(Gls)
2013–2015	Brisbane Roar	3	(0)
2014–2015	Brisbane Roar NPL	15	(6)
2016–2017	Bayside United	29	(7)
2021–2022	Bayside United	30	(32)
2022–	Northstar Football Club	12	(10)
- * Club domestic league appearances and goals as of 23 September 2022

Patrick Samuel Theodore (born 16 May 1996) is an Australian professional soccer player.

== Career ==
Born in Brisbane, Queensland, Theodore attended Iona College in Lyndum and was a member of the Iona First XI. Theodore began his career as a youth player for Wynnum District. He then spent the 2012–13 season with the Brisbane Roar youth side in the A-League National Youth League. Before the commencement of the 2013–14 A-League season, it was reported that the Brisbane Roar FC head coach Mike Mulvey had earmarked Theodore to play a part during the campaign.

Theodore eventually did make his professional debut with the Roar on 17 November 2013 against the Newcastle Jets in which he came on as an 84th-minute substitute for James Donachie as the Roar lost the match 2–1.

Theodore's 2014–15 inauguration came late in the 2014-15 when he was an inclusion as a starting left-winger versus Melbourne Victory, a 1–0 win to the Victorians. He then started the match against the Newcastle Jets where he was denied from close range by Jet's custodian Ben Kennedy. He was substituted for Kofi Danning in the 69th minute who went on to score the opening goal.

== Career statistics ==
As of 17 November 2013

Club	Season	League			Finals series		Asia^{1}		Total	
Club	Season	Division	Apps	Goals	Apps	Goals	Apps	Goals	Apps	Goals
Brisbane Roar	2013–14	A-League	1	0	-	-	-	-	1	0
Brisbane Roar	Total		1	0	0	0	0	0	1	0
Career total			1	0	0	0	0	0	1	0

^{1} – AFC Champions League statistics are included in season commencing during group stages (i.e. ACL 2013 and A-League season 2012–2013 etc.)
