= Matt McKay =

Australian association football player (born 1983)

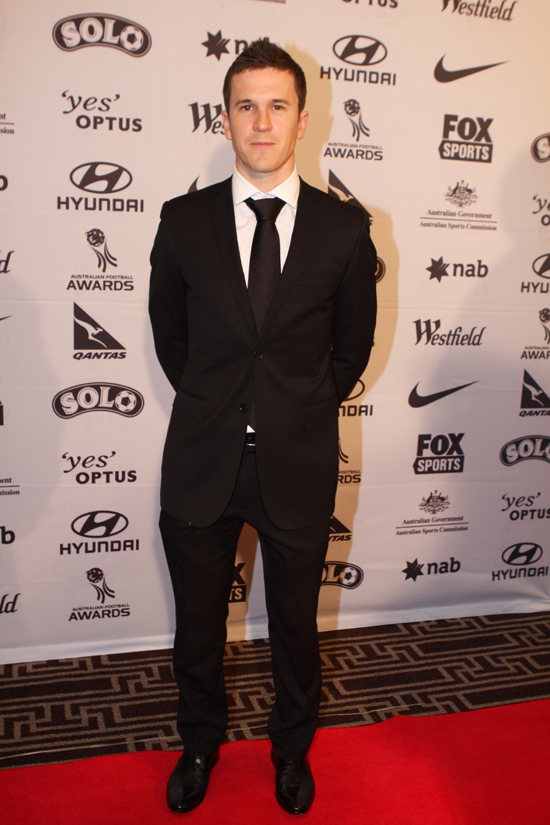
- McKay in 2011

Personal information
- Full name: Matthew Graham McKay
- Date of birth: 11 January 1983 (age 43)
- Place of birth: Brisbane, Queensland, Australia
- Height: 1.71 m (5 ft 7 in)
- Positions: Central midfielder; left midfielder; left back

Youth career
- 1999–2000: QAS
- 2001: AIS

Senior career*
Years	Team	Apps	(Gls)
2001–2004	Brisbane Strikers	51	(2)
2004	Eastern Suburbs	12	(1)
2005–2011	Brisbane Roar	131	(18)
2009	→ Changchun Yatai (loan)	15	(0)
2011–2012	Rangers	3	(0)
2012–2013	Busan IPark	27	(1)
2013	Changchun Yatai	16	(0)
2013–2019	Brisbane Roar	141	(8)
2020–	Capalaba FC II	42	(18)
2022–	Capalaba FC	1	(0)
Total		396	(30)

International career
2003	Australia U-20	4	(0)
2004	Australia U-23	1	(0)
2006–2016	Australia	59	(2)
Medal record
Representing Australia
Men's Association football
AFC Asian Cup
Winner	2015 Australia
Runner-up	2011 Qatar
OFC U-20 Championship
Winner	2002 Fiji/Vanuatu
- * Club domestic league appearances and goals

Matthew Graham McKay (born 11 January 1983) is a retired Australian professional footballer who last played for Australian A-League club Brisbane Roar, and previously with the Australian national team. McKay currently holds the club's record for league appearances, 272. McKay played for Brisbane Roar since their first season in the A-League, and was their club captain up until the 2010–11 season, in which he led Brisbane to their first ever A-League championship and premiership. Following this triumphant victory McKay sought a new challenge in the first division of the Scottish Premiership with Rangers. McKay played an integral role in Australia's second placing in the 2011 AFC Asian Cup notably with 30m cross to centre forward Harry Kewell. He was also part of the Australian squad at the 2014 World Cup and 2015 AFC Asian Cup.

== Club career ==
McKay spent his formative youth years at both the QAS and AIS. McKay's first club signing was in 1991 for the Sunnybank Saints Soccer Club, competing under the Queensland Christian Soccer Association. McKay was signed by NSL team the Brisbane Strikers in 2001, where he stayed until the conclusion of the 2003–04 National Soccer League season. McKay's last game for the Strikers was a 4–1 Victory over Adelaide United in the Elimination Final #1 as the Strikers could only level the tie 4–4 and bow out of the finals on away goals.

=== Brisbane Roar ===
McKay signed on as an inaugural member of the, then, Queensland Roar prior to the 2005–06 season – the first in the history of the A-League. McKay was given the number 17 shirt, which he has retained throughout his career at the Roar. Initially signed as a squad player behind the more established South Korean duo Hyuk-Su Seo and Tae-Yong Shin, McKay quickly got his opportunity due to a career-ending injury suffered by Shin in the clubs' first ever A-League fixture, against the now defunct, New Zealand Knights. Following the departure of club captain, Craig Moore midway through the 2009–10 season, McKay was named as club captain. He has played the highest number of games for the Roar with 184 appearances, scoring 21 goals.

McKay led Brisbane to their first A-League premiership and championship in 2011. The Roar topped the table, and continued their record-breaking 28-game (run finished at 36) unbeaten run with a miraculous 4–2 (2–2 aet) penalty shoot-out win over the Central Coast Mariners in the 2011 A-League Grand Final. It was reported after the match that a stirring speech by McKay at half-time in extra time boosted the Roar's morale sufficiently to unbelievably overcome a 2–0 deficit.

During his time at Brisbane Roar, McKay had a loan spell in 2009 during the A-League off season.. He joined Changchun Yatai F.C. in the Chinese Super League where he made 15 appearances.

=== Rangers ===
On 16 August 2011 Rangers confirmed the signing of McKay awaiting a work-permit, which was granted three days later, with a UK work visa granted a week later. McKay made his Rangers debut against Dundee United on 10 September 2011, coming on as a late substitute.

On 12 January 2012, it was reported that he had rejected the chance to go on loan to Al Ittihad who reportedly made an offer to Rangers of a loan-to-buy deal.

=== Busan IPark ===
Rangers began to have financial problems and on 14 February 2012 a dispute with HMRC came to a head when the business was placed into administration. Rangers were deducted 10 points as per SPL rules, which left them 14 points behind leaders Celtic.

On 22 February 2012, Rangers confirmed that they had agreed a fee with South Korean club Busan IPark for midfielder Matt McKay.

=== Changchun Yatai ===
In January 2013, McKay signed a two-year deal with Chinese Super League side Changchun Yatai. In July 2013, McKay mutually terminated his contract by the club.

=== Brisbane Roar ===
On 11 August 2013, McKay was announced as Brisbane Roar Australian Marquee for the next 2 seasons

== International career ==
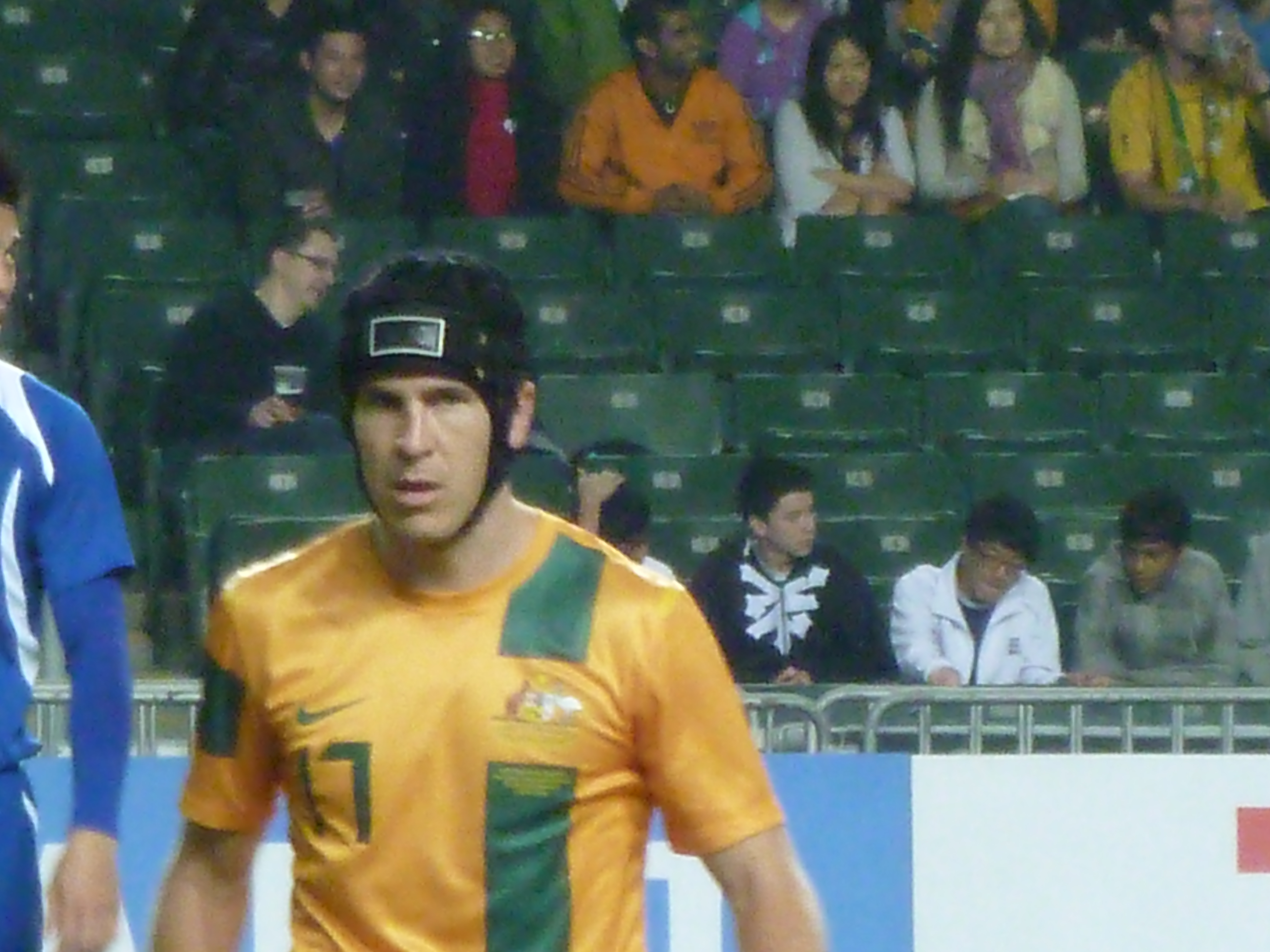
McKay with Australia in 2012

McKay represented Australia at U-20 level in the 2003 FIFA World Youth Championship.

On 16 August 2006, McKay came on as a substitute for Australia in the 90th minute of the 2007 Asian Cup qualifying match against Kuwait at Sydney Football Stadium for his first Socceroo cap.

McKay would have to wait until 28 January 2009 for his second cap, starting in Australia's 2011 Asian Cup qualifying match against Indonesia in Jakarta. He would also feature in two more qualification games for the 2011 Asian Cup, starting against Kuwait on 5 March 2009 at Canberra Stadium and playing the second half of the return tie against Indonesia on 3 March 2010 at Suncorp Stadium.

McKay missed out on Pim Verbeek's 2010 FIFA World Cup squad, however he returned to the Socceroos under new manager Holger Osieck and featured in three of Australia's friendlies in the leadup to the 2011 AFC Asian Cup. He came off the bench in the match against Paraguay on 9 October 2010 at the Sydney Football Stadium as well as coming off the bench against Egypt in Cairo on 17 November 2010.

McKay was selected for the 2011 AFC Asian Cup squad by Holger Osieck, and started in the team's pre-tournament friendly against the United Arab Emirates on 5 January 2011 in Al Ain. McKay went on to play a part in every game Australia played at the tournament, initially coming off the bench in the first two games against India and South Korea. He was named in the starting 11 for both the final group stage match against Bahrain and the subsequent quarter-final match against Iraq, and played a vital role in the latter, leading Australia to a 1–0 extra time victory, executing an inch-perfect cross for striker Harry Kewell to head into the goal for the match winner. McKay retained his starting position for the semi-final against Uzbekistan, and was again a key player for Australia in the team's 6–0 win, setting up three goals and being awarded man of the match. Due to McKay's excellent form, he was retained in the starting XI by Osieck for the Asian Cup Final, playing the full 120 minutes as the Socceroos lost 1–0 to Japan.

McKay captained Australia for the first time on 7 December 2012 against Guam in the 2013 EAFF East Asian Cup qualifiers. Australia won the match 9–0.

McKay also represented Australia at the 2014 World Cup in Brazil, playing in his preferred midfield position.

McKay was named as part of Australia's 2015 AFC Asian Cup squad. He made his first appearance of the tournament as a starter in Australia's 2nd group game against Oman, scoring Australia's first goal of the game off a Trent Sainsbury header, in an eventual 4–0 win.

== Career statistics ==
=== Club ===
As of 18 December 2016

Club	Season	Division	League^{1}		Cup^{2}		International^{3}		Total	
Club	Season	Division	Apps	Goals	Apps	Goals	Apps	Goals	Apps	Goals
Brisbane Strikers	2001–02	NSL	15	0	-	-	-	-	15	0
Brisbane Strikers	2002–03	NSL	21	1	-	-	-	-	21	1
Brisbane Strikers	2003–04	NSL	15	1	-	-	-	-	15	1
Brisbane Strikers	Total		51	2	-	-	-	-	51	2
Eastern Suburbs	2004	Brisbane Premier League	12	1	-	-	-	-	12	1
Eastern Suburbs	Total		12	1	-	-	-	-	12	1
Brisbane Roar	2005–06	A-League	18	2	0	0	0	0	18	2
Brisbane Roar	2006–07	A-League	20	3	0	0	0	0	20	3
Brisbane Roar	2007–08	A-League	23	3	0	0	0	0	23	0
Brisbane Roar	2008–09	A-League	24	5	0	0	0	0	24	5
Brisbane Roar	2009–10	A-League	19	2	0	0	0	0	19	2
Brisbane Roar	2010–11	A-League	27	3	0	0	0	0	27	3
Brisbane Roar	Total		131	18	0	0	0	0	131	18
Incheon United (loan)	2006	K-League	0	0	0	0	0	0	0	0
Changchun Yatai (loan)	2009	Chinese Super League	15	0	0	0	0	0	15	0
Rangers	2011–12	Scottish Premier League	3	0	0	0	0	0	3	0
Busan IPark	2012	K-League	27	1	1	0	0	0	28	1
Brisbane Roar	2013–14	A-League	24	1	0	0	0	0	24	1
Brisbane Roar	2014–15	A-League	18	2	0	0	6	0	24	2
Brisbane Roar	2015–16	A-League	26	2	1	0	0	0	27	2
Brisbane Roar	2016–17	A-League	14	0	1	0	0	0	11	0
Brisbane Roar	Total		82	5	2	0	6	0	90	5
Brisbane Roar	Club Total		213	23	2	0	6	0	221	23
Career Total			321	27	3	0	6	0	330	27

^{1} – includes A-League final series statistics
^{2} – includes Korean FA Cup and FFA Cup statistics ^{3} – includes FIFA Club World Cup statistics; AFC Champions League statistics are included in season commencing after group stages (i.e. ACL and A-League seasons etc.)

=== International ===
As of 28 May 2016

Australia national team
Year	Apps	Goals
2006	1	0
2007	0	0
2008	0	0
2009	2	0
2010	3	0
2011	17	0
2012	10	1
2013	12	0
2014	5	0
2015	8	1
2016	1	0
Total	59	2

Scores and results list Australia's goal tally first, score column indicates score after each McKay goal.

List of international goals scored by Matt McKay
No.	Date	Venue	Opponent	Score	Result	Competition	Ref.
1	6 September 2012	Tripoli Municipal Stadium, Tripoli, Lebanon	Lebanon	2–0	3–0	Friendly	
2	13 January 2015	ANZ Stadium, Sydney, Australia	Oman	1–0	4–0	2015 AFC Asian Cup	

== Honours ==
=== Player ===
Brisbane Roar

- A-League Premiership: 2010–11, 2013–14
- A-League Championship: 2010–11, 2013–14

Australia

- AFC Asian Cup: 2015; runner-up 2011

Australia U-20

- OFC U-19 Men's Championship: 2002

=== Individual ===
- Brisbane Roar Gary Wilkins Medal: 2006–07
- Brisbane Roar Players Player of the Year: 2006–07, 2010–11
- Brisbane Roar Members Player of the Year: 2006–07, 2010–11
- Football Media Association Player of the Year 2010–11
- PFA Footballer of the Year: 2010–11
- PFA A-League Team of the Season: 2010–11
- PFA A-League Team of the Decade: (2005–2015)
