= 2012–13 Melbourne Heart FC season =

Melbourne Heart
2012–13 season
- Chairman: Peter Sidwell
- Manager: John Aloisi
- Stadium: AAMI Park
- A-League: 9th
| Home colours | Away colours | Third colours |

The 2012–13 Melbourne Heart FC season was the club's third since its establishment in 2009. The club participated in the A-League for the third time.

== Players ==
=== Squad ===
Note: Flags indicate national team as defined under FIFA eligibility rules; some limited exceptions apply. Players may hold more than one non-FIFA nationality.

| No. | Pos. | Nation | Player |
|---|---|---|---|
| 1 | GK | AUS | Clint Bolton |
| 2 | DF | AUS | Michael Marrone |
| 3 | MF | AUS | Cameron Edwards (Youth) |
| 4 | DF | AUS | Simon Colosimo |
| 5 | MF | BRA | Fred (Captain) |
| 6 | DF | LBR | Patrick Gerhardt |
| 8 | MF | AUS | Matt Thompson (Vice Captain) |
| 9 | FW | AUS | Dylan Macallister |
| 10 | FW | CRO | Josip Tadić |
| 11 | MF | AUS | Richard Garcia |
| 13 | MF | ARG | Jonatan Germano |
| 14 | FW | AUS | Golgol Mebrahtu |
| 15 | FW | AUS | David Williams |
| 16 | DF | AUS | Aziz Behich |
| 16 | MF | NED | Marcel Meeuwis |

| No. | Pos. | Nation | Player |
|---|---|---|---|
| 17 | MF | AUS | Jason Hoffman |
| 18 | DF | AUS | David Vranković (Youth) |
| 19 | MF | AUS | Ben Garuccio (Youth) |
| 20 | GK | AUS | Andrew Redmayne |
| 21 | DF | IRL | Steven Gray |
| 21 | DF | AUS | Jamie Coyne |
| 22 | MF | AUS | Nick Kalmar |
| 23 | FW | AUS | Mate Dugandžić |
| 24 | DF | AUS | Sam Mitchinson (Youth) |
| 25 | DF | AUS | Jeremy Walker (Youth) |
| 26 | MF | AUS | Ersin Kaya (Youth) |
| 27 | MF | AUS | Stefan Mauk (Youth) |
| 31 | MF | AUS | Vince Grella |
| 36 | FW | AUS | Eli Babalj |

=== Transfers in ===
| Name | Position | Moving from | Notes |
|---|---|---|---|
| (Australia) Andrew Redmayne | Goalkeeper | (Australia) Brisbane Roar | 2-year contract |
| (Liberia) Patrick Nyema Gerhardt | Midfielder | (Bosnia and Herzegovina) Željezničar | 2-year contract (with visa) |
| (Australia) Golgol Mebrahtu | Forward | (Australia) Gold Coast United | 2-year contract |
| (Republic of Ireland) Steven Gray | Defender | (Australia) Oakleigh Cannons | 1-year contract (VISA) |
| (Croatia) Josip Tadić | Forward | (Poland) Lechia Gdańsk | 1-year contract (VISA) |
| (Australia) Dylan Macallister | Forward | (Australia) Gold Coast United | 2-year contract |
| (Australia) David Vranković | Defender | (Australia) Bonnyrigg White Eagles | 2-year contract |
| (Australia) Richard Garcia | Midfielder | (England) Hull City | 1-year contract |
| (Australia) Ben Garuccio | Midfielder | (Australia) Australian Institute of Sport | 1-year contract |
| (Australia) Vince Grella | Midfielder | (England) Blackburn Rovers | 1-year contract |
| (Australia) Cameron Edwards | Midfielder | (England) Reading | Half-year contract |
| (Australia) Eli Babalj | Striker | (Serbia) Red Star Belgrade | 1 and 1/2-year contract |
| (Australia) Jamie Coyne | Defender | (Indonesia) Sriwijaya | Half-year contract |
| (Netherlands) Marcel Meeuwis | Midfielder | (Netherlands) VVV-Venlo | Half-year contract (VISA) |

=== Transfers out ===
| Name | Position | Moving to | Notes |
|---|---|---|---|
| (Netherlands) Rutger Worm | Winger | (Netherlands) FC Emmen | Released |
| (Australia) Kristian Sarkies | Midfield | (Australia) Heidelberg United | Released |
| (Brazil) Maycon | Forward | (Malaysia) Pahang FA | Released |
| (Brazil) Alex Terra | Forward | (South Korea) Daejeon Citizen | Released |
| (Australia) Kamal Ibrahim | Winger | (Australia) Heidelberg United | Released |
| (Australia) Kliment Taseski | Midfield | (Australia) Moreland Zebras | Released |
| (Australia) Nikola Roganovic | Goalkeeper | (Australia) Green Gully | Released |
| (Australia) Adrian Zahra | Winger | (Australia) Perth Glory | Allowed to leave |
| (Australia) Craig Goodwin | Winger | (Australia) Newcastle Jets | Rejected new deal |
| (Australia) Eli Babalj | Striker | (Serbia) Red Star Belgrade | $430,000 transfer fee |
| (Australia) Wayne Srhoj | Midfield | Free agent | Released |
| (Australia) Brendan Hamill | Defender | (South Korea) Seongnam Ilhwa Chunma | |
| (Australia) Curtis Good | Defender | (England) Newcastle United | $600,000 transfer fee |
| (Australia) Michael Marrone | Defender | (China) Shanghai Shenxin | Undisclosed transfer fee |
| (Australia) Vince Grella | Midfielder | Retired | Retired |
| (Australia) Aziz Behich | Defender | (Turkey) Bursaspor | Undisclosed transfer free |
| (Republic of Ireland) Steven Gray | Defender | Free agent | Released |

== Statistics ==
=== Squad statistics ===
| N | Pos. | Nat. | Name | Total | | | | | A-League |
| N | Pos. | Nat. | Name | Apps | Goals | Yellow card | Second yellow card | Red card | Apps | Goals | Yellow card | Second yellow card | Red card |
|---|---|---|---|---|---|---|---|---|---|---|---|---|---|
| 1 | GK | (Australia) | Clint Bolton | 14 | 0 | 0 | 0 | 0 | 14 | 0 | 0 | 0 | 0 |
| 20 | GK | (Australia) | Andrew Redmayne | 13 | 0 | 3 | 0 | 0 | 13 | 0 | 3 | 0 | 0 |
| 2 | DF | (Australia) | Michael Marrone | 13 | 0 | 1 | 0 | 0 | 13 | 0 | 1 | 0 | 0 |
| 3 | DF | (Republic of Ireland) | Steven Gray | 1 | 0 | 1 | 0 | 0 | 1 | 0 | 1 | 0 | 0 |
| 4 | DF | (Australia) | Simon Colosimo | 21 | 0 | 5 | 0 | 2 | 21 | 0 | 5 | 0 | 2 |
| 6 | DF | (Liberia) | Patrick Gerhardt | 23 | 1 | 9 | 0 | 1 | 23 | 1 | 9 | 0 | 1 |
| 16 | DF | (Australia) | Aziz Behich | 14 | 0 | 5 | 0 | 0 | 14 | 0 | 5 | 0 | 0 |
| 17 | MF | (Australia) | Jason Hoffman | 17 | 0 | 5 | 0 | 0 | 9+ 8 | 0 | 5 | 0 | 0 |
| 18 | DF | (Australia) | David Vranković | 13 | 0 | 4 | 0 | 0 | 8+ 5 | 0 | 4 | 0 | 0 |
| 21 | DF | (Australia) | Jamie Coyne | 7 | 0 | 4 | 0 | 0 | 7 | 0 | 4 | 0 | 0 |
| 24 | DF | (Australia) | Sam Mitchinson | 9 | 0 | 2 | 0 | 0 | 8+ 1 | 0 | 2 | 0 | 0 |
| 25 | DF | (Australia) | Jeremy Walker | 13 | 0 | 2 | 0 | 0 | 13 | 0 | 2 | 0 | 0 |
| 5 | MF | (Brazil) | Fred | 19 | 2 | 3 | 0 | 0 | 15+ 4 | 2 | 3 | 0 | 0 |
| 8 | MF | (Australia) | Matt Thompson | 27 | 1 | 3 | 0 | 0 | 27 | 1 | 3 | 0 | 0 |
| 11 | MF | (Australia) | Richard Garcia | 24 | 6 | 6 | 0 | 0 | 24 | 6 | 6 | 0 | 0 |
| 13 | MF | (Argentina) | Jonatan Germano | 13 | 1 | 2 | 0 | 0 | 12+ 1 | 1 | 2 | 0 | 0 |
| 16 | DF | (Netherlands) | Marcel Meeuwis | 6 | 0 | 1 | 0 | 0 | 3+ 3 | 0 | 1 | 0 | 0 |
| 19 | MF | (Australia) | Ben Garuccio | 5 | 0 | 0 | 0 | 0 | 3+ 2 | 0 | 0 | 0 | 0 |
| 22 | MF | (Australia) | Nick Kalmar | 17 | 2 | 1 | 0 | 0 | 10+ 7 | 2 | 1 | 0 | 0 |
| 26 | MF | (Australia) | Ersin Kaya | 1 | 0 | 0 | 0 | 0 | 0+ 1 | 0 | 0 | 0 | 0 |
| 27 | MF | (Australia) | Stefan Mauk | 1 | 0 | 0 | 0 | 0 | 0+ 1 | 0 | 0 | 0 | 0 |
| 28 | MF | (Australia) | Paulo Retre | 0 | 0 | 0 | 0 | 0 | 0 | 0 | 0 | 0 | 0 |
| 31 | MF | (Australia) | Vince Grella | 1 | 0 | 0 | 0 | 0 | 0+ 1 | 0 | 0 | 0 | 0 |
| 9 | FW | (Australia) | Dylan Macallister | 20 | 1 | 2 | 0 | 0 | 5+15 | 1 | 2 | 0 | 0 |
| 10 | MF | (Croatia) | Josip Tadic | 22 | 6 | 3 | 0 | 0 | 19+ 3 | 6 | 3 | 0 | 0 |
| 14 | FW | (Australia) | Golgol Mebrahtu | 14 | 4 | 0 | 0 | 0 | 4+10 | 4 | 0 | 0 | 0 |
| 15 | FW | (Australia) | David Williams | 24 | 5 | 6 | 0 | 1 | 20+ 4 | 5 | 6 | 0 | 1 |
| 23 | FW | (Australia) | Mate Dugandžić | 7 | 0 | 1 | 0 | 0 | 6+ 1 | 0 | 1 | 0 | 0 |
| 36 | MF | (Australia) | Eli Babalj | 9 | 1 | 2 | 0 | 0 | 5+ 4 | 1 | 2 | 0 | 0 |

- Last updated: 7 October 2015
- Source: espnfc.com
- (yellow card) = Number of bookings; (second yellow card) = Number of sending offs after a second yellow card; (red card) = Number of sending offs by a direct red card.

=== Goal scorers ===
| Total | Player | | Goals per round | | | | | | | | | | | | | | | | | | | | | | | | | | | | |
|---|---|---|---|---|---|---|---|---|---|---|---|---|---|---|---|---|---|---|---|---|---|---|---|---|---|---|---|---|---|---|---|
| | Player | | | | 1 | 2 | 3 | 4 | 5 | 6 | 7 | 8 | 9 | 10 | 11 | 12 | 13 | 14 | 15 | 16 | 17 | 18 | 19 | 20 | 21 | 22 | 23 | 24 | 25 | 26 | 27 |
| 6 | (Croatia) | Josip Tadić | | | | | 1 | 1 | | 1 | | | | | | 1 | 1 | | 1 | | | | | | | | | | | | |
| 6 | (Australia) | Richard Garcia | | | | | | 1 | | 2 | | | | | | | | 1 | 1 | | | | | | | | | | 1 | | |
| 4 | (Australia) | David Williams | 1 | | | | | 1 | | | | | | | | | 1 | | | | 1 | | | 1 | | | | | | | |
| 4 | (Australia) | Golgol Mebrahtu | | | | | | | | | | 1 | | | 1 | 1 | | | | | | | | | | | 1 | | | | |
| 2 | (Brazil) | Fred | | | | | | | | | | | | 1 | | | 1 | | | | | | | | | | | | | | |
| 2 | (Australia) | Nick Kalmar | | | | | | | | | | | | | | | | | | | | 1 | | 1 | | | | | | | |
| 1 | (Australia) | Dylan Macallister | 1 | | | | | | | | | | | | | | | | | | | | | | | | | | | | |
| 1 | (Australia) | Matt Thompson | | 1 | | | | | | | | | | | | | | | | | | | | | | | | | | | |
| 1 | (Liberia) | Patrick Gerhardt | | | | | | 1 | | | | | | | | | | | | | | | | | | | | | | | |
| 1 | (Australia) | Eli Babalj | | | | | | | | | | | | | | | | | | | | 1 | | | | | | | | | |
| 1 | (Argentina) | Jonatan Germano | | | | | | | | | | | | | | | | | | | | | | 1 | | | | | | | |
| 1 | | Own Goal | | | | | | | | | | | | | 1 | | | | | | | | | | | | | | | | |
| 31 | Total | | 2 | 1 | 0 | 0 | 1 | 4 | 0 | 3 | 0 | 1 | 0 | 1 | 2 | 2 | 3 | 1 | 2 | 0 | 1 | 2 | 0 | 3 | 0 | 0 | 1 | 0 | 1 | | |

== Competitions ==
=== Pre-season ===
| 27 July 2012 1 | Victorian Champions League XI | 0 – 4 | Melbourne Heart | Stead Park, Geelong |
| 20:00 | | Match highlights | Macallister 42', 52'; Kalmar 74'; Colosimo 89' | Attendance: 500 |

| 1 August 2012 2 | Port Melbourne Sharks | 0 – 8 | Melbourne Heart | JL Murphy Reserve, Port Melbourne |
| 19:30 | | Match report | Macallister 20', 27', 33', 60'; Grech 69' (o.g.); Z. Walker 70', 85'; Williams 87' |

| 8 August 2012 3 | Melbourne Knights | 0 – 2 | Melbourne Heart | Knights Stadium, Sunshine |
| 19:30 | | Match report | Macallister 18'; Williams 83' |

| 15 August 2012 4 | Northcote City | 0 – 1 | Melbourne Heart | Epping Stadium |
| 19:30 | | | Macallister (?) |

| 21 August 2012 5 | Melbourne Heart | 1 – 2 | Adelaide United | Epping Stadium |
| 19:30 | Mebrahtu 28' | Match highlights | Vidošić 10', 73' (pen.) |

| 31 August 2012 6 | Western Sydney Wanderers | 0 – 0 | Melbourne Heart | Oakes Oval, Lismore |
| 19:30 | | Match report |

| 16 September 2012 7 | Peninsula XI | 0 – 2 | Melbourne Heart | Langwarrin Soccer Club |
| 15:00 | | Match report | Mebrahtu 26'; Macallister 38' |

| 23 September 2012 8 | Melbourne Heart | 0 – 5 | Perth Glory | Epping Stadium |
| 13:00 | | | Smeltz 10' (pen.), 20'; Burns 42'; Makarounas 65'; Nagai 67' |

=== A-League ===
==== League table ====
| Pos | Team | Pld | W | D | L | GF | GA | GD | Pts | Qualification |
|---|---|---|---|---|---|---|---|---|---|---|
| 1 | Western Sydney Wanderers | 27 | 18 | 3 | 6 | 41 | 21 | +20 | 57 | Qualification for 2014 AFC Champions League group stage and finals series |
| 2 | Central Coast Mariners (C) | 27 | 16 | 6 | 5 | 48 | 22 | +26 | 54 | Qualification for 2014 AFC Champions League group stage and finals series |
| 3 | Melbourne Victory | 27 | 13 | 5 | 9 | 48 | 45 | +3 | 44 | Qualification for 2014 AFC Champions League qualifying play-off and finals series (Note: Since the winner of 2013 A-League Grand Final (Central Coast Mariners) qualified for the 2014 AFC Champions League group stage, the 3rd placed team qualified for the qualifying play-off of 2014 AFC Champions League.) |
| 4 | Adelaide United | 27 | 12 | 5 | 10 | 38 | 37 | +1 | 41 | Qualification for Finals series |
| 5 | Brisbane Roar | 27 | 10 | 5 | 12 | 33 | 29 | +4 | 35 | Qualification for Finals series |
| 6 | Perth Glory | 27 | 9 | 5 | 13 | 29 | 31 | −2 | 32 | Qualification for Finals series |
| 7 | Sydney FC | 27 | 9 | 5 | 13 | 41 | 51 | −10 | 32 | |
| 8 | Newcastle Jets | 27 | 8 | 7 | 12 | 30 | 45 | −15 | 31 | |
| 9 | Melbourne Heart | 27 | 8 | 3 | 16 | 31 | 40 | −9 | 27 | |
| 10 | Wellington Phoenix (Note: Wellington Phoenix cannot qualify for the AFC Champions League as they are not recognised as an AFC club.) | 27 | 7 | 6 | 14 | 31 | 49 | −18 | 27 | |

Updated to match(es) played on 30 March 2013. Source: ultimatealeague.com
Rules for classification: 1) points; 2) goal difference; 3) number of goals scored.
(C) Champions

==== Results summary ====
| Overall | | | | | | | | Home | | | | | | Away | | | | | |
| Pld | W | D | L | GF | GA | GD | Pts | W | D | L | GF | GA | GD | W | D | L | GF | GA | GD |
|---|---|---|---|---|---|---|---|---|---|---|---|---|---|---|---|---|---|---|---|
| 27 | 8 | 3 | 16 | 31 | 40 | −9 | 27 | 7 | 2 | 4 | 23 | 17 | +6 | 1 | 1 | 12 | 8 | 23 | −15 |

Source: Competitive Matches

==== Results by round ====
| Round | 1 | 2 | 3 | 4 | 5 | 6 | 7 | 8 | 9 | 10 | 11 | 12 | 13 | 14 | 15 | 16 | 17 | 18 | 19 | 20 | 21 | 22 | 23 | 24 | 25 | 26 | 27 |
|---|---|---|---|---|---|---|---|---|---|---|---|---|---|---|---|---|---|---|---|---|---|---|---|---|---|---|---|
| Ground | A | H | A | H | A | H | A | H | A | H | A | H | A | H | H | A | H | A | A | H | A | H | A | H | H | A | A |
| Result | W | D | L | L | L | W | L | D | D | W | L | L | L | W | W | L | W | L | L | W | L | W | L | L | L | L | L |
| Position | 3 | 3 | 7 | 9 | 10 | 6 | 9 | 8 | 9 | 7 | 8 | 8 | 10 | 9 | 6 | 7 | 5 | 6 | 7 | 5 | 8 | 6 | 7 | 9 | 9 | 9 | 9 |

Source: Competitive Matches
A = Away; H = Home; W = Win; D = Draw; L = Loss

==== Matches ====
| 5 October 2012 1 | Melbourne Victory | 1 - 2 | Melbourne Heart | Etihad Stadium, Melbourne |
| Friday 19:30 AEST | Rojas 25' | Report | Williams 15'; Macallister 45+2' | Attendance: 42,032; Referee: Jarred Gillett |

| 14 October 2012 2 | Melbourne Heart | 1 - 1 | Wellington Phoenix | AAMI Park, Melbourne |
| Sunday 15:00 AEDT | Thompson 21'; Colosimo (red card) 47' | Report | Ifill 48' (pen.) | Attendance: 11,007; Referee: Kris Griffiths-Jones |

| 21 October 2012 3 | Perth Glory | 2 - 0 | Melbourne Heart | nib Stadium, Perth |
| Sunday 14:00 AWST | Heffernan 39'; Mehmet 85' | Report | | Attendance: 7,548; Referee: Matthew Gillett |

| 28 October 2012 4 | Melbourne Heart | 0 - 1 | Central Coast Mariners | AAMI Park, Melbourne |
| Sunday 15:00 AEDT | | Report | Bojić 51' | Attendance: 6,357; Referee: Chris Beath |

| 2 November 2012 5 | Western Sydney Wanderers | 2 - 1 | Melbourne Heart | Parramatta Stadium, Sydney |
| Friday 19:30 AEST | Bridge 28'; Gerhardt 52' (o.g.) | Report | Tadić 57' | Attendance: 8,075; Referee: Regis Queffelec |

| 9 November 2012 6 | Melbourne Heart | 4 - 1 | Brisbane Roar | AAMI Park, Melbourne |
| Friday 19:30 AEDT | Gerhardt 20'; Garcia 63'; Tadić 72' (pen.); Williams 75' | Report | Henrique 82' | Attendance: 5,466; Referee: Shaun Evans |

| 17 November 2012 7 | Adelaide United | 1 - 0 | Melbourne Heart | Hindmarsh Stadium, Adelaide |
| Saturday 17:00 ACDT | Neumann 58' | Report | | Attendance: 8,816; Referee: Ben Williams |

| 24 November 2012 8 | Melbourne Heart | 3 - 3 | Newcastle Jets | AAMI Park, Melbourne |
| Saturday 17:30 AEDT | Garcia 1', 72'; Tadić 6' (pen.) | Report | Goodwin 56'; Zadkovich 63'; Griffiths 87' (pen.) | Attendance: 7,125; Referee: Jarred Gillett |

| 2 December 2012 9 | Sydney FC | 0 - 0 | Melbourne Heart | Allianz Stadium, Sydney |
| Sunday 17:00 AEDT | | Report | | Attendance: 12,425; Referee: Strebre Delovski |

| 8 December 2012 10 | Melbourne Heart | 1 - 0 | Perth Glory | AAMI Park, Melbourne |
| Saturday 17:30 AEDT | Mebrahtu 89' | Report | | Attendance: 4,505; Referee: Peter Green |

| 14 December 2012 11 | Central Coast Mariners | 2 - 0 | Melbourne Heart | Bluetongue Stadium, Gosford |
| Friday 19:30 AEDT | Bojić 49', 69' | Report | | Attendance: 6,921; Referee: Lucien Laverdure |

| 22 December 2012 12 | Melbourne Heart | 1 - 2 | Melbourne Victory | AAMI Park, Melbourne |
| Saturday 19:45 AEDT | Fred 81' | Report | Rojas 67'; Thompson 90+3' | Attendance: 26,457; Referee: Alan Milliner |

| 27 December 2012 13 | Wellington Phoenix | 3 - 2 | Melbourne Heart | Westpac Stadium, Wellington |
| Thursday 19:30 NZDT | Fenton 21'; Brockie 66' (pen.), 71' | Report | Mebrahtu 14'; Durante 15' (o.g.) | Attendance: 6,401; Referee: Shaun Evans |

| 1 January 2013 14 | Melbourne Heart | 2 - 1 | Newcastle Jets | AAMI Park, Melbourne |
| Tuesday 16:00 AEDT | Mebrahtu 7'; Tadić 27' (pen.) | Report | R. Griffiths 18' (pen.) | Attendance: 5,641; Referee: Chris Beath |

| 6 January 2013 15 | Melbourne Heart | 3 - 2 | Brisbane Roar | AAMI Park, Melbourne |
| Sunday 16:00 AEDT | Williams 15'; Tadić 37'; Fred 53'; Williams (red card) 67' | Report | Berisha 74' (pen.), 77' | Attendance: 6,303; Referee: Alan Milliner |

| 13 January 2013 16 | Sydney FC | 2 - 1 | Melbourne Heart | Allianz Stadium, Sydney |
| Sunday 17:00 AEDT | Emerton 85'; Grant 90+3' | Report | Garcia 24' | Attendance: 13,125; Referee: Peter O'Leary |

| 18 January 2013 17 | Melbourne Heart | 2 - 0 | Adelaide United | AAMI Park, Melbourne |
| Friday 19:30 AEDT | Tadić 5'; Garcia 50' | Report | | Attendance: 7,181; Referee: Lucien Laverdure |

| 26 January 2013 18 | Western Sydney Wanderers | 1 - 0 | Melbourne Heart | Parramatta Stadium, Sydney |
| Saturday 19:45 AEDT | Polenz (red card) 13'; Ono 73' (pen.) | Report | | Attendance: 14,624; Referee: Strebre Delovski |

| 2 February 2013 19 | Melbourne Victory | 2 - 1 | Melbourne Heart | Etihad Stadium, Melbourne |
| Saturday 19:45 AEDT | Thompson 28'; Milligan 55' (pen.) | Report | Williams 72' | Attendance: 41,203; Referee: Strebre Delovski |

| 9 February 2013 20 | Melbourne Heart | 2 - 0 | Perth Glory | AAMI Park, Melbourne |
| Saturday 17:30 AEDT | Kalmar 23'; Babalj 57' | Report | | Attendance: 6,096; Referee: Alan Milliner |

| 15 February 2013 21 | Newcastle Jets | 2 - 0 | Melbourne Heart | Hunter Stadium, Newcastle |
| Friday 19:30 AEDT | Heskey 10'; R. Griffiths 81' | Report | | Attendance: 11,396; Referee: Chris Beath |

| 24 February 2013 22 | Melbourne Heart | 3 - 1 | Sydney FC | AAMI Park, Melbourne |
| Sunday 17:00 AEDT | Kalmar 31'; Germano 36'; Williams 55' (pen.) | Report | J. Griffiths 58' | Attendance: 13,752; Referee: Alan Milliner |

| 3 March 2013 23 | Wellington Phoenix | 1 - 0 | Melbourne Heart | Forsyth Barr Stadium, Dunedin |
| Sunday 16:30 NZDT | Brockie 19'; Huysegems (yellow card) 45' (red card) 85' | Report | | Attendance: 3,060; Referee: Brenton Hayward |

| 11 March 2013 24 | Melbourne Heart | 0 - 2 | Adelaide United | AAMI Park, Melbourne |
| Monday 19:30 AEDT | | Report | Vidošić 41' (pen.); Ramsay 54' | Attendance: 5,393; Referee: Chris Beath |

| 16 March 2013 25 | Melbourne Heart | 1 - 3 | Western Sydney Wanderers | AAMI Park, Melbourne |
| Saturday 17:30 AEDT | Mebrahtu 40'; Colosimo (yellow card) 75' (red card) 79' | Report | Haliti 28', 59'; La Rocca 88' | Attendance: 6,101; Referee: Ben Williams |

| 24 March 2013 26 | Brisbane Roar | 2 - 0 | Melbourne Heart | Suncorp Stadium, Brisbane |
| Sunday 16:00 AEST | Berisha 12' (pen.); Broich 32' | Report | | Attendance: 9,869; Referee: Matthew Gillett |

| 30 March 2013 27 | Central Coast Mariners | 2 - 1 | Melbourne Heart | Bluetongue Stadium, Gosford |
| Saturday 17:30 AEDT | McBreen 35' (pen.); Duke 63' | Report | Gerhardt (red card) 33'; Garcia 73' | Attendance: 8,271; Referee: Jarred Gillett |
