= 2015–16 Brisbane Roar FC season =

Brisbane Roar
2015–16 season
- Chairman: Chris Fong (until 9 November 2015); Rahim Soekasah (from 9 November 2015)
- Manager: John Aloisi
- Stadium: Suncorp Stadium, Brisbane
- A-League: 3rd
- A-League Finals Series: Semi-finals
- FFA Cup: Round of 32
- Top goalscorer: League: Jamie Maclaren (18 goals); All: Jamie Maclaren (20 goals)
- Highest home attendance: 17,696 vs Perth Glory (2 January 2016)
- Lowest home attendance: 5,162 vs Wellington Phoenix (12 December 2015)
- Average home league attendance: 12,850
Home colours	Away colours	Third colours

The 2015–16 Brisbane Roar FC season was the club's eleventh season participating in the A-League and in the FFA Cup for the second time.

== Players ==
=== Squad information ===
Note: Flags indicate national team as defined under FIFA eligibility rules; some limited exceptions apply. Players may hold more than one non-FIFA nationality.

No.	Pos.	Nation	Player
1	GK	AUS	Michael Theo
3	DF	AUS	Shane Stefanutto (Vice Captain)
5	DF	AUS	Corey Brown
6	DF	GER	Jérome Polenz
7	MF	ESP	Corona
8	MF	AUS	Steven Lustica
9	FW	AUS	Jamie Maclaren
10	FW	BRA	Henrique
11	FW	CRC	Jean Carlos Solórzano
13	DF	AUS	Jade North
14	DF	AUS	Daniel Bowles
15	DF	AUS	James Donachie

No.	Pos.	Nation	Player
16	MF	AUS	Devante Clut
17	MF	AUS	Matt McKay (Captain)
18	MF	ESP	Javier Hervás
19	DF	AUS	Jack Hingert
20	FW	AUS	Shannon Brady
21	GK	ENG	Jamie Young
22	MF	GER	Thomas Broich
23	FW	AUS	Dimitri Petratos
24	MF	AUS	Tommy Oar
28	FW	AUS	Brandon Borrello (FT Youth)
29	MF	AUS	Joe Caletti
33	DF	AUS	Luke DeVere

=== From youth squad ===
N	Pos.	Nat.	Name	Age	Notes

=== Transfers in ===
No.	Pos.	Nat.	Name	Age	Moving from	Type	Transfer window	Ends	Transfer fee	Source
9	FW	(Australia)	Jamie Maclaren	21	Perth Glory	Transfer	Pre-season	2016	Free	
32	MF	(Australia)	George Lambadaridis	23		Injury Replacement	Pre-season	2015	Free	
7	MF	(Spain)	Corona	34		Transfer	Pre-season	2017	Free	
18	MF	(Spain)	Javier Hervás	26		Transfer	Pre-season	2016	Free	
29	MF	(Australia)	Joe Caletti	17	FFA Centre of Excellence	Transfer	Round 17		Free	
24	MF	(Australia)	Tommy Oar	24		Transfer	Round 22	2018	Free	

=== Transfers out ===
No.	Pos.	Nat.	Name	Age	Moving to	Type	Transfer window	Transfer fee	Source
20	FW	(Australia)	Kofi Danning	24	Oakleigh Cannons	Transfer	Pre-season	Free	
4	MF	(Australia)	Adam Sarota	26	Utrecht (Netherlands)	Loan return	Pre-season	Free	
6	MF	(Australia)	George Lambadaridis	23		Released	Pre-season		
27	MF	(Australia)	Ben Litfin	20		Released	Pre-season		
9	FW	(Serbia)	Andrija Kaluđerović	27		Released	Pre-season		
26	DF	(Australia)	Lachlan Jackson	20	Newcastle Jets	Transfer	Pre-season		
18	MF	(Australia)	Luke Brattan	25		Released	Pre-season		
37	MF	(Australia)	Abraham Yango	19	Avondale FC	Transfer	Mid-season		

== Technical staff ==
Position	Name
Manager	(Australia) John Aloisi
Assistant manager	(Australia) Ross Aloisi
Goalkeeping coach	(Australia) Jason Kearton
Youth coach	(Australia) Josh McCloughan
Strength & Conditioning Coach	(Australia) Karl Dodd
Physiotherapist	(Australia) Tony Ganter

== Statistics ==
=== Squad statistics ===
N	Pos.	Nat.	Name	Total					A-League					FFA Cup
N	Pos.	Nat.	Name	Apps	Goals	Yellow card	Second yellow card	Red card	Apps	Goals	Yellow card	Second yellow card	Red card	Apps	Goals	Yellow card	Second yellow card	Red card
1	GK	(Australia)	Michael Theo	9	0	2	0	0	9	0	2	0	0	0	0	0	0	0
3	DF	(Australia)	Shane Stefanutto	17	0	5	0	0	15+1	0	5	0	0	1	0	0	0	0
5	DF	(Australia)	Corey Brown	15	1	3	0	0	13+2	1	3	0	0	0	0	0	0	0
6	DF	(Germany)	Jérome Polenz	1	0	0	0	0	1	0	0	0	0	0	0	0	0	0
7	MF	(Spain)	Corona	29	2	3	0	0	29	2	3	0	0	0	0	0	0	0
8	MF	(Australia)	Steven Lustica	22	1	1	0	0	6+16	1	1	0	0	0	0	0	0	0
9	FW	(Australia)	Jamie Maclaren	26	20	1	0	0	25	20	1	0	0	1	0	0	0	0
10	FW	(Brazil)	Henrique	24	8	1	0	0	7+17	8	1	0	0	0	0	0	0	0
12	FW	(Costa Rica)	Jean Carlos Solórzano	7	0	0	0	0	2+5	0	0	0	0	0	0	0	0	0
13	DF	(Australia)	Jade North	30	3	8	0	0	29	3	8	0	0	1	0	0	0	0
14	DF	(Australia)	Daniel Bowles	22	1	7	0	0	21+1	1	7	0	0	0	0	0	0	0
15	DF	(Australia)	James Donachie	11	0	1	0	0	9+1	0	1	0	0	1	0	0	0	0
16	MF	(Australia)	Devante Clut	9	0	1	0	0	0+8	0	1	0	0	0+1	0	0	0	0
17	MF	(Australia)	Matt McKay	27	2	5	0	0	26	2	5	0	0	1	0	0	0	0
18	MF	(Spain)	Javier Hervás	17	0	0	0	0	2+15	0	0	0	0	0	0	0	0	0
19	DF	(Australia)	Jack Hingert	29	0	3	1	0	28	0	3	1	0	1	0	0	0	0
21	GK	(England)	Jamie Young	21	0	0	0	0	20	0	0	0	0	1	0	0	0	0
22	MF	(Germany)	Thomas Broich	30	2	0	0	0	28+1	2	0	0	0	1	0	0	0	0
23	MF	(Australia)	Dimitri Petratos	30	7	4	0	0	25+4	7	4	0	0	1	0	0	0	0
24	MF	(Australia)	Tommy Oar	6	0	1	0	0	2+4	0	1	0	0	0	0	0	0	0
26	FW	(Australia)	Nicholas D'Agostino	1	0	0	0	0	1	0	0	0	0	0	0	0	0	0
28	FW	(Australia)	Brandon Borrello	23	5	2	0	0	21+1	5	2	0	0	1	0	0	0	0
29	MF	(Australia)	Joe Caletti	0	0	0	0	0	0	0	0	0	0	0	0	0	0	0
29	FW	(Australia)	Patrick Theodore	0	0	0	0	0	0	0	0	0	0	0	0	0	0	0
33	DF	(Australia)	Luke DeVere	0	0	0	0	0	0	0	0	0	0	0	0	0	0	0
34	MF	(Australia)	Shannon Brady	2	0	0	0	0	0+2	0	0	0	0	0	0	0	0	0
36	GK	(Australia)	Andre Jannese	0	0	0	0	0	0	0	0	0	0	0	0	0	0	0
41	MF	(Australia)	Luke Pavlou	0	0	0	0	0	0	0	0	0	0	0	0	0	0	0
Players no longer at the club:
18	MF	(Australia)	Luke Brattan	1	0	1	0	0	0	0	0	0	0	1	0	1	0	0
32	MF	(Australia)	George Lambadaridis	1	0	0	0	0	0+1	0	0	0	0	0	0	0	0	0
37	MF	(Australia)	Abraham Yango	1	0	0	0	0	0	0	0	0	0	0+1	0	0	0	0

- Last updated: 24 April 2016
- Source: au.soccerway.com
- (yellow card) = Number of bookings; (second yellow card) = Number of sending offs after a second yellow card; (red card) = Number of sending offs by a direct red card.

== Pre-season and friendlies ==
17 July 2015	Brisbane Roar (Australia)	1–2	(England) Liverpool	Brisbane, Australia
18:45 (AEST)	D. Petratos 17'	Report	Lallana 28'; Milner 75'	Stadium: Suncorp Stadium; Attendance: 50,000; Referee: Hiroyuki Kimura (Japan)

19 August 2015 SE Queensland Tour	Brisbane Roar (Australia)	0–1	(Australia) Melbourne Victory	Southport, Australia
19:00 (AEST)		Report	Geria 71'	Stadium: Fankhauser Reserve; Referee: Alan Milliner

30 August 2015 SE Queensland Tour	Gold Coast All-Stars (Australia)	0–10	(Australia) Brisbane Roar	Ashmore, Australia
15:00 (AEST)		Report	Maclaren 11' (pen.), 13', 21', 23', 57', 64', 73', 87'; Borrello 72'; Yango 83'	Stadium: Ashmore Village Park

12 September 2015 SE Queensland Tour	Brisbane Roar (Australia)	0–0	(Australia) Newcastle Jets	Redland City, Australia
14:00 (AEST)		Report		Stadium: Cleveland Showgrounds; Referee: Jarred Gillett

19 September 2015 SE Queensland Tour	Brisbane Roar (Australia)	8–0	(Australia) NPL Queensland U23 All-Stars	Brisbane, Australia
16:30 (AEST)	Solórzano 5'; Lustica 6' (pen.), 14', 39'; Borrello 21'; Polenz 61'; D. Petratos 76'; Hingert 79'	Report		Stadium: QSAC; Referee: Chris Beath

26 September 2015 SE Queensland Tour	Brisbane Roar (Australia)	3–1	(Australia) Central Coast Mariners	Kawana Waters, Australia
19:00 (AEST)	Brown 51'; D. Petratos 59'; Borrello 83'	Report	Fitzgerald 13'	Stadium: Sunshine Coast Stadium; Referee: Chris Beath

== Competitions ==
=== Overview ===
Competition	First match	Last match	Starting round	Final position	Record							
Competition	First match	Last match	Starting round	Final position	Pld	W	D	L	GF	GA	GD	Win %
A-League	8 October 2015	9 April 2016	Matchday 1	3rd	27	14	6	7	49	40	+9	51.85
A-League Finals	15 April 2016	24 April 2016	Elimination-finals	Semi-finals	2	1	0	1	6	6	+0	50.00
FFA Cup	11 August 2015		Round of 32	Round of 32	1	0	0	1	0	1	−1	0.00
Total					30	15	6	9	55	47	+8	50.00

Source: Competitions

=== A-League ===
==== League table ====
Pos	Team	Pld	W	D	L	GF	GA	GD	Pts	Qualification
1	Adelaide United (C)	27	14	7	6	45	28	+17	49	Qualification for 2017 AFC Champions League group stage and Finals series
2	Western Sydney Wanderers	27	14	6	7	44	33	+11	48	Qualification for 2017 AFC Champions League group stage and Finals series
3	Brisbane Roar	27	14	6	7	49	40	+9	48	Qualification for 2017 AFC Champions League second preliminary round and Finals series
4	Melbourne City	27	13	5	9	63	44	+19	44	Qualification for Finals series
5	Perth Glory	27	13	4	10	49	42	+7	43	Qualification for Finals series
6	Melbourne Victory	27	11	8	8	40	33	+7	41	Qualification for Finals series
7	Sydney FC	27	8	10	9	36	36	0	34	
8	Newcastle Jets	27	8	6	13	28	41	−13	30	
9	Wellington Phoenix (Note: Wellington Phoenix cannot qualify for the AFC Champions League as they are not recognised as an AFC club.)	27	7	4	16	34	54	−20	25	
10	Central Coast Mariners	27	3	4	20	33	70	−37	13	

Source: A-Leagues
Rules for classification: 1) points; 2) goal difference; 3) number of goals scored.
(C) Champions

==== Results summary ====
Overall								Home						Away					
Pld	W	D	L	GF	GA	GD	Pts	W	D	L	GF	GA	GD	W	D	L	GF	GA	GD
27	14	6	7	49	40	+9	48	10	2	1	32	15	+17	4	4	6	17	25	−8

Last updated: 9 April 2016.
Source: ultimatealeague.com

==== Results by round ====
Round	1	2	3	4	5	6	7	8	9	10	11	12	13	14	15	16	17	18	19	20	21	22	23	24	25	26	27
Ground	A	H	A	H	A	H	H	A	A	H	A	H	H	A	A	H	A	H	H	A	A	H	H	A	H	H	A
Result	W	W	L	W	D	W	D	D	L	W	W	W	W	D	L	L	W	W	D	L	L	W	W	L	W	W	D
Position	1	1	2	2	2	1	1	3	4	2	2	2	1	1	1	3	2	2	1	2	3	3	1	3	2	1	3

Updated to match(es) played on 10 April 2016. Source: ultimatealeague.com
A = Away; H = Home; W = Win; D = Draw; L = Loss

==== Matches ====
8 October 2015 1	Western Sydney Wanderers	1–3	Brisbane Roar	Parramatta
Thursday 20:00 AEDT	Nichols 13'	Report	Maclaren 9', 34'; Bowles 23'	Stadium: Pirtek Stadium; Attendance: 14,122; Referee: Jarred Gillett

18 October 2015 2	Brisbane Roar	2–1	Central Coast Mariners	Brisbane
Sunday 16:00 AEST	Borrello 14', 60'	Report	Bingham 88'	Stadium: Suncorp Stadium; Attendance: 14,471; Referee: Ben Williams

24 October 2015 3	Wellington Phoenix	3–2	Brisbane Roar	Wellington
Saturday 19:15 NZDT	McGlinchey 35'; Krishna 49'; Powell 78'	Report	D. Petratos 26'; North 60'	Stadium: Westpac Stadium; Attendance: 6,103; Referee: Jarred Gillett

31 October 2015 4	Brisbane Roar	3–0	Adelaide United	Brisbane
Saturday 18:30 AEST	Borrello 9', 90+2'; Maclaren 79'	Report		Stadium: Suncorp Stadium; Attendance: 10,707; Referee: Chris Beath

6 November 2015 5	Sydney FC	0–0	Brisbane Roar	Sydney
Friday 19:40 AEDT		Report		Stadium: Allianz Stadium; Attendance: 12,857; Referee: Strebre Delovski

15 November 2015 6	Brisbane Roar	1–0	Perth Glory	Brisbane
Sunday 16:00 AEST	Henrique 74'	Report		Stadium: Suncorp Stadium; Attendance: 11,748; Referee: Shaun Evans

20 November 2015 7	Brisbane Roar	1–1	Melbourne City	Brisbane
Friday 19:00 AEST	Henrique 70'	Report	Novillo 47'	Stadium: Suncorp Stadium; Attendance: 10,812; Referee: Chris Beath

28 November 2015 8	Newcastle Jets	1–1	Brisbane Roar	Newcastle
Saturday 17:15 AEDT	Kantarovski 71'	Report	Maclaren 52'	Stadium: Hunter Stadium; Attendance: 10,155; Referee: Peter Green

5 December 2015 9	Western Sydney Wanderers	2–1	Brisbane Roar	Parramatta
Saturday 19:30 AEDT	Bridge 29'; Nichols 79'	Report	Maclaren 36'	Stadium: Pirtek Stadiuk; Attendance: 9,860; Referee: Kris Griffiths-Jones

12 December 2015 10	Brisbane Roar	2–1	Wellington Phoenix	Cairns
Saturday 16:15 AEST	Lustica 71'; Maclaren 86'	Report	Krishna 45+1'	Stadium: Cazaly's Stadium; Attendance: 5,162; Referee: Jarred Gillett

20 December 2015 11	Central Coast Mariners	0–1	Brisbane Roar	Gosford
Sunday 17:00 AEDT		Report	D. Petratos 85'	Stadium: Central Coast Stadium; Attendance: 5,124; Referee: Chris Beath

27 December 2015 12	Brisbane Roar	3–1	Melbourne City	Brisbane
Sunday 18:00 AEST	Kisnorbo 31' (o.g.); Borrello 40'; Henrique 90+4'	Report	Fornaroli 49'	Stadium: Suncorp Stadium; Attendance: 16,435; Referee: Jarred Gillett

2 January 2016 13	Brisbane Roar	2–1	Perth Glory	Brisbane
Saturday 16:15 AEST	Maclaren 52'; Henrique 61'	Report	Gligor 70'	Stadium: Suncorp Stadium; Attendance: 17,696; Referee: Chris Beath

10 January 2016 14	Wellington Phoenix	0–0	Brisbane Roar	Wellington
Sunday 19:00 NZDT		Report		Stadium: Westpac Stadium; Attendance: 7,774; Referee: Stephen Lucas

15 January 2016 15	Melbourne Victory	4–0	Brisbane Roar	Melbourne
Friday 19:40 AEDT	Ben Khalfallah 5'; Barbarouses 11', 30'; Berisha 52'	Report		Stadium: AAMI Park; Attendance: 23,207; Referee: Shaun Evans

22 January 2016 16	Brisbane Roar	1–4	Adelaide United	Brisbane
Friday 19:00 AEST	Henrique 50' (pen.)	Report	C. Brown 19' (o.g.); Djite 56' (pen.), 67'; Carrusca 90+2'	Stadium: Suncorp Stadium; Attendance: 12,923; Referee: Jarred Gillett

30 January 2016 17	Sydney FC	1–3	Brisbane Roar	Sydney
Saturday 19:30 AEDT	Corona 52' (o.g.)	Report	Maclaren 8', 76'; McKay 67'	Stadium: Allianz Stadium; Attendance: 12,548; Referee: Peter Green

6 February 2016 18	Brisbane Roar	4–0	Central Coast Mariners	Brisbane
Saturday 16:15 AEST	North 20'; Maclaren 36'; Corona 59'; Henrique 72' (pen.)	Report	Ascroft (red card) 71'	Stadium: Suncorp Stadium; Attendance: 11,788; Referee: Matthew Conger

12 February 2016 19	Brisbane Roar	2–2	Newcastle Jets	Brisbane
Friday 19:00 AEST	Maclaren 6'; Alivodić 69' (o.g.)	Report	Cooper 15'; Trifunović 19' (pen.)	Stadium: Suncorp Stadium; Attendance: 9,382; Referee: Kris Griffiths-Jones

20 February 2016 20	Perth Glory	6–3	Brisbane Roar	Perth
Saturday 18:40 AWST	Keogh 5'; Harold 32'; Marinković 38'; Lowry 41'; Castro 49' (pen.); R. Garcia 86'	Report	Maclaren 17'; D. Petratos 28'; North 36'	Stadium: nib Stadium; Attendance: 12,156; Referee: Strebre Delovski

27 February 2016 21	Adelaide United	3–0	Brisbane Roar	Adelaide
Saturday 16:45 ACDT	Kamau 38'; Djite 50'; Sánchez 81'	Report		Stadium: Coopers Stadium; Attendance: 12,712; Referee: Shaun Evans

4 March 2016 22	Brisbane Roar	3–2	Western Sydney Wanderers	Brisbane
Friday 19:00 AEST	Maclaren 5', 81'; D. Petratos 84'	Report	Andreu 74' (pen.); Castelen 78'	Stadium: Suncorp Stadium; Attendance: 13,157; Referee: Ben Williams

12 March 2016 23	Brisbane Roar	5–0	Melbourne Victory	Brisbane
Saturday 18:30 AEST	Maclaren 18', 22', 87'; Brown 55'; Corona 76'	Report		Stadium: Suncorp Stadium; Attendance: 15,892; Referee: Jarred Gillett

18 March 2016 24	Melbourne City	3–1	Brisbane Roar	Melbourne
Friday 19:40 AEDT	Mooy 54' (pen.); Cáceres 81'; Fitzgerald 84'	Report	Petratos 22'; Hingert (yellow card) 45+1' (yellow-red card) 54'	Stadium: AAMI Park; Attendance: 7,658; Referee: Kris Griffiths-Jones

26 March 2016 25	Brisbane Roar	3–2	Sydney FC	Brisbane
Saturday 18:30 AEST	D. Petratos 32'; Maclaren 36'; Henrique 88'	Report	Hološko 24', 87'	Stadium: Suncorp Stadium; Attendance: 14,897; Referee: Shaun Evans

3 April 2016 26	Brisbane Roar	2–1	Newcastle Jets	Brisbane
Sunday 17:00 AEST	Henrique 67' (pen.); Broich 74'	Report	Leonardo 50' (pen.); Boogaard (red card) 66'	Stadium: Suncorp Stadium; Attendance: 14,825; Referee: Strebre Delovski

9 April 2016 27	Melbourne Victory	0–0	Brisbane Roar	Melbourne
Saturday 19:30 AEST		Report		Stadium: AAMI Park; Attendance: 20,012; Referee: Peter Green

==== Finals series ====
15 April 2016 Elimination-finals	Brisbane Roar	2–1	Melbourne Victory	Brisbane
19:30 AEST	McKay 88'; Broich 90+3'	Report	Geria (red card) 83'; Berisha 86'	Stadium: Suncorp Stadium; Attendance: 20,157; Referee: Jarred Gillett

24 April 2016 Semi-finals	Western Sydney Wanderers	5–4	Brisbane Roar	Parramatta
16:30 AEST	Castelen 26', 53', 59'; Šantalab 39'; Vidošić 102'	Report	D. Petratos 16' (pen.); Andreu 20' (o.g.); Maclaren 23', 81'	Stadium: Pirtek Stadium; Attendance: 20,084; Referee: Peter Green

=== FFA Cup ===
11 August 2015 Round of 32	Western Sydney Wanderers (New South Wales)	1 – 0	(Queensland) Brisbane Roar	Sydney
19:30 AEST	Mebrahtu 69'	Report		Stadium: Penrith Stadium; Attendance: 6,028; Referee: Kris Griffiths-Jones

== See also ==
- 2015–16 Brisbane Roar FC (W-League) season
