= 2012–13 A-League =

36th season of top-tier soccer league in Australia

A-League
- Season: 2012–13
- Dates: 5 October 2012 – 21 April 2013
- Champions: Central Coast Mariners (1st title)
- Premiers: Western Sydney Wanderers (1st title)
- Champions League: Western Sydney Wanderers; Central Coast Mariners; Melbourne Victory
- Matches: 135
- Goals: 370 (2.74 per match)
- Top goalscorer: Daniel McBreen (19 goals)
- Best goalkeeper: Ante Covic
- Biggest home win: Sydney FC 7–1 Wellington Phoenix (19 January 2013)
- Biggest away win: Newcastle Jets 0–3 Wellington Phoenix (18 November 2012); Newcastle Jets 0–3 Western Sydney Wanderers (29 March 2013)
- Highest scoring: Central Coast Mariners 7–2 Sydney FC (3 November 2012)
- Longest winning run: Western Sydney Wanderers (10)
- Longest unbeaten run: Western Sydney Wanderers (13)
- Longest winless run: Perth Glory (8)
- Longest losing run: Melbourne Heart (5); Perth Glory (5)
- Highest attendance: 42,032
- Lowest attendance: 3,060
- Average attendance: 12,341 ( 1,853)

The 2012–13 A-League was the 36th season of top-flight soccer in Australia, and the eighth season of the Australian A-League since its establishment in 2004. The 2012–13 season saw the introduction of a new Western Sydney-based team, the return of Newcastle Jets FC after their A-League licence was returned by FFA, and the end of Gold Coast United after they were removed from the competition at the end of the previous season. This season was also the last A-League season to be broadcast exclusively on paid television, after SBS obtained the rights to a live Friday night game each week of the A-League season, and all A-League finals games on a one-hour delay, on a $160 million four-year broadcast deal, effective from the 2013–14 A-League season onwards.

== Clubs ==

Team	City	Home ground	Capacity
Adelaide United	Adelaide	Hindmarsh Stadium	17,000
Brisbane Roar	Brisbane	Suncorp Stadium	52,500
Central Coast Mariners	Gosford	Bluetongue Stadium	20,119
Melbourne Heart	Melbourne	AAMI Park	30,050
Melbourne Victory	Melbourne	Etihad Stadium; AAMI Park	56,347; 30,050
Newcastle Jets	Newcastle	Hunter Stadium	33,000
Perth Glory	Perth	NIB Stadium; Patersons Stadium	20,500; 43,500
Sydney FC	Sydney	Allianz Stadium	45,500
Wellington Phoenix	Wellington	Westpac Stadium	36,000
Western Sydney Wanderers	Sydney	Parramatta Stadium	21,487

=== Personnel and kit specifications ===
Team	Manager	Captain	Kit manufacturer	Kit partner
Adelaide United	(Australia) Michael Valkanis	(Australia) Eugene Galeković	Kappa	Unleash Solar
Brisbane Roar	(England) Mike Mulvey	(Australia) Matt Smith	Puma	The Coffee Club
Central Coast Mariners	(Australia) Graham Arnold	(Malta) John Hutchinson	Kappa	Masterfoods
Melbourne Heart	(Australia) John Aloisi	(Brazil) Fred	Kappa	Westpac
Melbourne Victory	(Australia) Ange Postecoglou	(Australia) Adrian Leijer	Adidas	Adecco
Newcastle Jets	(Australia) Gary van Egmond	(Australia) Ruben Zadkovich	ISC	Hunter Ports
Perth Glory	(Australia) Alistair Edwards	(Australia) Jacob Burns	X-blades	QBE Insurance
Sydney FC	(Australia) Frank Farina	(Northern Ireland) Terry McFlynn	Adidas	Webjet
Wellington Phoenix	(England) Chris Greenacre	(Australia) Andrew Durante	Adidas	Sony
Western Sydney Wanderers	(Australia) Tony Popovic	(Australia) Michael Beauchamp	Nike	NRMA Insurance

=== Managerial changes ===
Team	Outgoing manager	Manner of departure	Date of vacancy	Table	Incoming manager	Date of appointment
Melbourne Heart	(Netherlands) John van 't Schip	Mutual termination	1 February 2012	Pre-season	(Australia) John Aloisi	8 May 2012
Sydney FC	(Czech Republic) Vitezslav Lavicka	Contract expired	3 February 2012	Pre-season	(England) Ian Crook	14 May 2012
Melbourne Victory	(Northern Ireland) Jim Magilton	Contract expired	1 April 2012	Pre-season	(Australia) Ange Postecoglou	26 April 2012
Western Sydney Wanderers	Inaugural		4 April 2012	Pre-season	(Australia) Tony Popovic	17 May 2012
Brisbane Roar	(Australia) Ange Postecoglou	Resigned	24 April 2012	Pre-season	(Croatia) Rado Vidošić	25 April 2012
Sydney FC	(England) Ian Crook	Resigned	11 November 2012	8th	(Australia) Frank Farina	28 November 2012
Brisbane Roar	(Croatia) Rado Vidošić	Mutual Consent	19 December 2012	9th	(England) Mike Mulvey	19 December 2012
Adelaide United	(Australia) John Kosmina	Resigned	28 January 2013	4th	(Australia) Michael Valkanis	28 January 2013
Perth Glory	(Scotland) Ian Ferguson	Termination	11 February 2013	10th	(Australia) Alistair Edwards	11 February 2013
Wellington Phoenix	(New Zealand) Ricki Herbert	Resigned	26 February 2013	10th	(England) Chris Greenacre	26 February 2013

=== Foreign players ===
Club	Visa 1	Visa 2	Visa 3	Visa 4	Visa 5	Non-Visa foreigner(s)	Former player(s)
Adelaide United	(Argentina) Marcelo Carrusca	(Argentina) Jerónimo	(Indonesia) Sergio van Dijk	(Philippines) Iain Ramsay^{2} (Portugal) Fábio Ferreira		(Brazil) Cássio^{1}	(Netherlands) Sergio van Dijk
Brisbane Roar	(Albania) Besart Berisha	(Brazil) Henrique	(Germany) Thomas Broich	(Netherlands) Stef Nijland	(South Korea) Do Dong-Hyun	(Sri Lanka) Jack Hingert^{2}	
Central Coast Mariners	(Netherlands) Patrick Zwaanswijk	(New Zealand) Michael McGlinchey	(Scotland) Nick Montgomery			(Malta) John Hutchinson^{2} (Papua New Guinea) Brad McDonald^{2}	
Melbourne Heart	(Argentina) Jonatan Germano	(Brazil) Fred	(Croatia) Josip Tadic	(Liberia) Patrick Gerhardt	(Netherlands) Marcel Meeuwis		
Melbourne Victory	(Argentina) Marcos Flores	(Brazil) Guilherme Finkler	(Ivory Coast) Adama Traore	(Mauritius) Jonathan Bru	(New Zealand) Marco Rojas		
Newcastle Jets	(Brazil) Bernardo Ribeiro	(England) Michael Bridges	(England) Emile Heskey	(Switzerland) Dominik Ritter			(Brazil) Tiago
Perth Glory	(Argentina) Matías Córdoba	(Republic of Ireland) Liam Miller	(Japan) Ryo Nagai	(Scotland) Steven McGarry		(New Zealand) Storm Roux^{2} (New Zealand) Shane Smeltz^{2} (Zambia) Ndumba Makeche^{1}	(Republic of Ireland) Billy Mehmet
Sydney FC	(Brazil) Fabio	(Croatia) Kruno Lovrek	(Italy) Alessandro Del Piero	(Netherlands) Pascal Bosschaart	(Panama) Yairo Yau	(Brazil) Tiago^{3} (Croatia) Vedran Janjetović^{1} (Iraq) Ali Abbas^{1} (Northern Ireland) Terry McFlynn^{1}	
Wellington Phoenix	(Barbados) Paul Ifill	(Belgium) Stein Huysegems	(Solomon Islands) Benjamin Totori	(Spain) Dani Sánchez	(United States) Alex Smith	(Malta) Manny Muscat^{2}	
Western Sydney Wanderers	(Croatia) Dino Kresinger	(Croatia) Mateo Poljak	(Germany) Jérome Polenz	(Italy) Iacopo La Rocca	(Netherlands) Youssouf Hersi	(Japan) Shinji Ono^{5} (New Zealand) Kwabena Appiah^{2}	

The following do not fill a Visa position:
^{1}Those players who were born and started their professional career abroad but have since gained Australian Residency (and New Zealand Residency, in the case of Wellington Phoenix);
^{2}Australian residents (and New Zealand residents, in the case of Wellington Phoenix) who have chosen to represent another national team;
^{3}Injury Replacement Players, or National Team Replacement Players;
^{4}Guest Players (eligible to play a maximum of ten games)
^{5}Additional Expansion Club Visa Player

=== Salary cap exemptions and captains ===
Club	Australian Marquee	International Marquee	Captain	Vice-Captain
Adelaide United	(Australia) Dario Vidosic	(Indonesia) Sergio van Dijk (Note: Van Dijk was mutually released from his contract and marquee deal by Adelaide United part-way through on 30 January 2013.)	(Australia) Eugene Galekovic	(Brazil) Cássio
Brisbane Roar	None	(Germany) Thomas Broich	(Australia) Matt Smith	(Australia) Shane Stefanutto
Central Coast Mariners	None	None	(Malta) John Hutchinson	(Netherlands) Patrick Zwaanswijk
Melbourne Heart	None	(Brazil) Fred	(Brazil) Fred	(Australia) Matt Thompson
Melbourne Victory	(Australia) Archie Thompson	(Argentina) Marcos Flores	(Australia) Adrian Leijer	(Australia) Mark Milligan
Newcastle Jets	None	(England) Emile Heskey	(Australia) Jobe Wheelhouse (Australia) Ruben Zadkovich (Note: Zadkovich replaced Wheelhouse as captain mid-season, after Wheelhouse left the club in January 2013.)	(Australia) Ryan Griffiths
Perth Glory	None	(New Zealand) Shane Smeltz	(Australia) Jacob Burns	(Australia) Michael Thwaite
Sydney FC	(Australia) Brett Emerton	(Italy) Alessandro Del Piero	(Northern Ireland) Terry McFlynn	(Italy) Alessandro Del Piero (Australia) Brett Emerton
Wellington Phoenix	None	None	(New Zealand) Andrew Durante	(New Zealand) Ben Sigmund
Western Sydney Wanderers	None	(Japan) Shinji Ono	(Australia) Michael Beauchamp	(Australia) Tarek Elrich (Australia) Nikolai Topor-Stanley

== Regular season ==
=== League table ===
Pos	Team	Pld	W	D	L	GF	GA	GD	Pts	Qualification
1	Western Sydney Wanderers	27	18	3	6	41	21	+20	57	Qualification for 2014 AFC Champions League group stage and finals series
2	Central Coast Mariners (C)	27	16	6	5	48	22	+26	54	Qualification for 2014 AFC Champions League group stage and finals series
3	Melbourne Victory	27	13	5	9	48	45	+3	44	Qualification for 2014 AFC Champions League qualifying play-off and finals series (Note: Since the winner of 2013 A-League Grand Final (Central Coast Mariners) qualified for the 2014 AFC Champions League group stage, the 3rd placed team qualified for the qualifying play-off of 2014 AFC Champions League.)
4	Adelaide United	27	12	5	10	38	37	+1	41	Qualification for Finals series
5	Brisbane Roar	27	10	5	12	33	29	+4	35	Qualification for Finals series
6	Perth Glory	27	9	5	13	29	31	−2	32	Qualification for Finals series
7	Sydney FC	27	9	5	13	41	51	−10	32	
8	Newcastle Jets	27	8	7	12	30	45	−15	31	
9	Melbourne Heart	27	8	3	16	31	40	−9	27	
10	Wellington Phoenix (Note: Wellington Phoenix cannot qualify for the AFC Champions League as they are not recognised as an AFC club.)	27	7	6	14	31	49	−18	27	

Updated to match(es) played on 30 March 2013. Source: ultimatealeague.com
Rules for classification: 1) points; 2) goal difference; 3) number of goals scored.
(C) Champions

=== Home and away season ===
The 2012–13 season sees each team play 27 games, kicking off on 5 October 2012, and concluding on 31 March 2013.

==== Week 1 ====
5 October 2012	Melbourne Victory	1–2	Melbourne Heart	Etihad Stadium, Melbourne
Friday 19:30 AEST	Rojas 26'	Report	14' Williams; 45+2' Macallister	Attendance: 42,032; Referee: Jarred Gillett

6 October 2012	Wellington Phoenix	2–0	Sydney FC	Westpac Stadium, Wellington
Saturday 19:30 NZDT	Huysegems 43'; Fenton 75'	Report		Attendance: 12,057; Referee: Peter Green

6 October 2012	Western Sydney Wanderers	0–0	Central Coast Mariners	Parramatta Stadium, Sydney
Saturday 19:45 AEST		Report		Attendance: 10,458; Referee: Alan Milliner

7 October 2012	Newcastle Jets	0–2	Adelaide United	Hunter Stadium, Newcastle
Sunday 15:00 AEDT		Report	2' Vidošić; 75' Ramsay	Attendance: 14,868; Referee: Shaun Evans

7 October 2012	Perth Glory	1–0	Brisbane Roar	Patersons Stadium, Perth
Sunday 14:00 AWST	Mehmet 88'	Report		Attendance: 14,085; Referee: Ben Williams

==== Week 2 ====
12 October 2012	Adelaide United	1–0	Western Sydney Wanderers	Hindmarsh Stadium, Adelaide
Friday 19:00 ACDT	Neumann 70'	Report		Attendance: 8,950; Referee: Brenton Hayward

13 October 2012	Sydney FC	2–3	Newcastle Jets	Allianz Stadium, Sydney
Saturday 17:30 AEDT	Del Piero 26'; Powell 76'	Report	11' Griffiths; 41' Heskey; 64' Goodwin	Attendance: 35,419; Referee: Chris Beath

13 October 2012	Brisbane Roar	5–0	Melbourne Victory	Suncorp Stadium, Brisbane
Saturday 18:45 AEST	Broich 22'; Paartalu 23'; Berisha 64', 90+2'; Nichols 82'	Report		Attendance: 17,364; Referee: Strebre Delovski

14 October 2012	Melbourne Heart	1–1	Wellington Phoenix	AAMI Park, Melbourne
Sunday 15:00 AEDT	Thompson 20'	Report	Ifill 45' (pen.)	Attendance: 10,097; Referee: Kris Griffiths-Jones

14 October 2012	Central Coast Mariners	1–0	Perth Glory	Bluetongue Stadium, Gosford
Sunday 17:00 AEDT	McBreen 70'	Report		Attendance: 9,192; Referee: Jarred Gillett

==== Week 3 ====
19 October 2012	Melbourne Victory	2–1	Adelaide United	Etihad Stadium, Melbourne
Friday 19:30 AEDT	Milligan 52'; Rojas 67'	Report	Vidošić 50' (pen.)	Attendance: 19,174; Referee: Peter Green

20 October 2012	Newcastle Jets	2–1	Central Coast Mariners	Hunter Stadium, Newcastle
Saturday 17:30 AEDT	Griffiths 5' (pen.); Heskey 61'	Report	Ibini-Isei 71'	Attendance: 15,289; Referee: Ben Williams

20 October 2012	Western Sydney Wanderers	0–1	Sydney FC	Parramatta Stadium, Sydney
Saturday 19:45 AEST		Report	Del Piero 54'	Attendance: 19,126; Referee: Strebre Delovski

21 October 2012	Wellington Phoenix	1–1	Brisbane Roar	Westpac Stadium, Wellington
Sunday 16:30 NZDT	Huysegems 16'	Report	Berisha 39'	Attendance: 9,182; Referee: Adam Kersey

21 October 2012	Perth Glory	2–0	Melbourne Heart	nib Stadium (reduced capacity), Perth
Sunday 14:00 AWST	Heffernan 38'; Mehmet 85'	Report		Attendance: 7,548; Referee: Matthew Gillett

==== Week 4 ====
26 October 2012	Newcastle Jets	2–1	Melbourne Victory	Hunter Stadium, Newcastle
Friday 19:30 AEDT	Heskey 54', 56'	Report	Thompson 71'	Attendance: 13,912; Referee: Alan Milliner

27 October 2012	Adelaide United	3–1	Wellington Phoenix	Hindmarsh Stadium, Adelaide
Saturday 17:00 ACDT	Neumann 55', 85'; Cássio 68'	Report	Huysegems 42'	Attendance: 8,497; Referee: Jarred Gillett

27 October 2012	Brisbane Roar	0–1	Western Sydney Wanderers	Suncorp Stadium, Brisbane
Saturday 18:45 AEST		Report	Bridge 19'	Attendance: 12,663; Referee: Lucien Laverdure

28 October 2012	Melbourne Heart	0–1	Central Coast Mariners	AAMI Park, Melbourne
Sunday 15:00 AEDT		Report	Bojić 51'	Attendance: 6,357; Referee: Chris Beath

28 October 2012	Sydney FC	2–1	Perth Glory	ANZ Stadium, Sydney
Sunday 17:00 AEDT	Del Piero 59'; Emerton 70'	Report	Dodd 18'	Attendance: 22,128; Referee: Peter Green

==== Week 5 ====
2 November 2012	Western Sydney Wanderers	2–1	Melbourne Heart	Parramatta Stadium, Sydney
Friday 19:30 AEST	Bridge 28'; Gerhardt 51' (o.g.)	Report	Tadić 57'	Attendance: 8,075; Referee: Regis Queffelec

3 November 2012	Perth Glory	3–2	Newcastle Jets	nib Stadium, Perth
Saturday 18:45 AWST	McGarry 10'; Ward 37'; Harold 84'	Report	Calvano 5'; Mitchell 70'	Attendance: 9,293; Referee: Alan Milliner

3 November 2012	Central Coast Mariners	7–2	Sydney FC	Bluetongue Stadium, Gosford
Saturday 19:30 AEDT	Rogić 16', 63'; Ryall 30' (o.g.); McBreen 39' (pen.), 65', 67'; McGlinchey 56'	Report	Yau 8'; Abbas 54'	Attendance: 15,686; Referee: Strebre Delovski

4 November 2012	Brisbane Roar	0–1	Adelaide United	Suncorp Stadium, Brisbane
Sunday 16:00 AEST		Report	Vidošić 3'	Attendance: 12,856; Referee: Chris Beath

5 November 2012	Melbourne Victory	3–2	Wellington Phoenix	Etihad Stadium, Melbourne
Monday 19:30 AEDT	Rojas 23', 48'; Flores 38'	Report	Brockie 81', 90+2'	Attendance: 20,683; Referee: Shaun Evans

==== Week 6 ====
9 November 2012	Melbourne Heart	4–1	Brisbane Roar	AAMI Park, Melbourne
Friday 19:30 AEDT	Gerhardt 20'; Garcia 63'; Tadić 71' (pen.); Williams 74'	Report	Henrique 82'	Attendance: 5,466; Referee: Shaun Evans

10 November 2012	Western Sydney Wanderers	1–2	Newcastle Jets	Parramatta Stadium, Sydney
Saturday 17:30 AEST	Gibbs 15'	Report	Griffiths 28'; Heskey 37'	Attendance: 9,011; Referee: Brenton Hayward

10 November 2012	Sydney FC	2–3	Melbourne Victory	Allianz Stadium, Sydney
Saturday 19:45 AEDT	Yau 14'; Bosschaart 48'	Report	Nabbout 78', 90'; Thompson 86'	Attendance: 21,531; Referee: Kris Griffith-Jones

11 November 2012	Wellington Phoenix	0–1	Central Coast Mariners	Westpac Stadium, Wellington
Sunday 16:30 NZDT		Report	McBreen 68'	Attendance: 6,568; Referee: Lucien Lavendure

11 November 2012	Adelaide United	1–1	Perth Glory	Hindmarsh Stadium, Adelaide
Sunday 16:30 ACDT	Vidošić 48'	Report	Mehmet 42'	Attendance: 9,212; Referee: Peter O'Leary

==== Week 7 ====
16 November 2012	Brisbane Roar	4–2	Sydney FC	Suncorp Stadium, Brisbane
Friday 19:00 AEST	Broich 29'; Paartalu 32'; Halloran 44'; Berisha 56'	Report	Del Piero 41', 48'	Attendance: 22,970; Referee: Alan Milliner

17 November 2012	Adelaide United	1–0	Melbourne Heart	Hindmarsh Stadium, Adelaide
Saturday 17:00 ACDT	Neumann 58'	Report		Attendance: 8,816; Referee: Ben Williams

17 November 2012	Melbourne Victory	2–2	Central Coast Mariners	Etihad Stadium, Melbourne
Saturday 19:45 AEDT	Nabbout 10'; Milligan 40'	Report	McBreen 4', 22'	Attendance: 19,462; Referee: Strebre Delovski

18 November 2012	Newcastle Jets	0–3	Wellington Phoenix	Hunter Stadium, Newcastle
Sunday 15:00 AEDT		Report	Brockie 44', 81'; Ifill 87' (pen.)	Attendance: 13,116; Referee: Chris Beath

18 November 2012	Perth Glory	0–1	Western Sydney Wanderers	nib Stadium, Perth
Sunday 14:00 AWST		Report	La Rocca 15'	Attendance: 9,060; Referee: Kris Griffiths-Jones

==== Week 8 ====
23 November 2012	Sydney FC	1–2	Adelaide United	Allianz Stadium, Sydney
Friday 19:30 AEDT	Yau 56'	Report	20' Ferreira; 88' Vidošić	Attendance: 13,317; Referee: Peter Green

24 November 2012	Melbourne Heart	3–3	Newcastle Jets	AAMI Park, Melbourne
Saturday 17:30 AEDT	Garcia 1', 71'; Tadić 5' (pen.)	Report	Goodwin 56'; Zadkovich 63'; Griffiths 87' (pen.)	Attendance: 7,125; Referee: Jarred Gillett

24 November 2012	Perth Glory	1–1	Wellington Phoenix	nib Stadium, Perth
Saturday 18:45 AWST	Smeltz 62'	Report	Brockie 73'	Attendance: 7,982; Referee: Strebre Delovski

24 November 2012	Western Sydney Wanderers	0–2	Melbourne Victory	Parramatta Stadium, Sydney
Saturday 19:45 AEST		Report	Beauchamp 44' (o.g.); Thompson 60'	Attendance: 9,614; Referee: Ben Williams

25 November 2012	Central Coast Mariners	2–1	Brisbane Roar	Bluetongue Stadium, Gosford
Sunday 17:00 AEDT	Ibini-Isei 4'; Rogic 81'	Report	Murdocca 32'	Attendance: 9,084; Referee: Chris Beath

==== Week 9 ====
30 November 2012	Melbourne Victory	1–0	Perth Glory	AAMI Park, Melbourne
Friday 19:30 AEDT	Rojas 58'	Report		Attendance: 17,676; Referee: Jarred Gillett

1 December 2012	Central Coast Mariners	2–1	Adelaide United	Bluetongue Stadium, Gosford
Saturday 17:30 AEDT	Rose 45'; Montgomery 76'	Report	Djite 17'	Attendance: 6,885; Referee: Alan Milliner

1 December 2012	Brisbane Roar	1–0	Newcastle Jets	Suncorp Stadium, Brisbane
Saturday 18:45 AEST	Berisha 41' (pen.)	Report		Attendance: 12,546; Referee: Brenton Hayward

2 December 2012	Wellington Phoenix	1–0	Western Sydney Wanderers	Westpac Stadium, Wellington
Sunday 16:30 NZDT	Brockie 22'	Report		Attendance: 5,405; Referee: Matthew Gillett

2 December 2012	Sydney FC	0–0	Melbourne Heart	Allianz Stadium, Sydney
Sunday 17:00 AEDT		Report		Attendance: 12,425; Referee: Strebre Delovski

==== Week 10 ====
7 December 2012	Adelaide United	4–2	Melbourne Victory	Hindmarsh Stadium, Adelaide
Friday 19:00 ACDT	Kostopoulos 3', 32'; Ferreira 21'; Carrusca 25'	Report	Nabbout 5'; Rojas 47'	Attendance: 14,115; Referee: Chris Beath

8 December 2012	Melbourne Heart	1–0	Perth Glory	AAMI Park, Melbourne
Saturday 17:30 AEDT	Mebrahtu 89'	Report		Attendance: 4,505; Referee: Peter Green

8 December 2012	Newcastle Jets	0–2	Central Coast Mariners	Hunter Stadium, Newcastle
Saturday 19:45 AEDT		Report	McBreen 49', 66'	Attendance: 13,122; Referee: Jarred Gillett

9 December 2012	Wellington Phoenix	1–2	Sydney FC	Westpac Stadium, Wellington
Sunday 16:30 NZDT	Brockie 90+2' (pen.)	Report	Ryall 45+1'; Grant 70'	Attendance: 7,375; Referee: Kris Griffiths-Jones

9 December 2012	Western Sydney Wanderers	1–0	Brisbane Roar	Parramatta Stadium, Sydney
Sunday 17:00 AEST	Ono 87' (pen.)	Report		Attendance: 6,755; Referee: Alan Milliner

==== Week 11 ====
14 December 2012	Perth Glory	3–0	Newcastle Jets	nib Stadium, Perth
Friday 18:45 AWST	Dodd 45+1', 49'; Smeltz 75' (pen.)	Report		Attendance: 6,967; Referee: Ben Williams

14 December 2012	Central Coast Mariners	2–0	Melbourne Heart	Bluetongue Stadium, Gosford
Friday 19:30 AEDT	Bojić 50', 69'	Report		Attendance: 6,921; Referee: Lucien Laverdure

15 December 2012	Melbourne Victory	1–1	Brisbane Roar	AAMI Park, Melbourne
Saturday 17:30 AEDT	Milligan 49'	Report	Halloran 24'	Attendance: 17,128; Referee: Jarred Gillett

15 December 2012	Sydney FC	0–2	Western Sydney Wanderers	Allianz Stadium, Sydney
Saturday 19:45 AEDT		Report	Hersi 24'; Beauchamp 77'	Attendance: 26,176; Referee: Chris Beath

16 December 2012	Adelaide United	3–1	Wellington Phoenix	Hindmarsh Stadium, Adelaide
Sunday 16:30 ACDT	Carrusca 19', 24'; Ferreira 45+2'	Report	Sánchez 81'	Attendance: 8,657; Referee: Strebre Delovski

==== Week 12 ====
21 December 2012	Western Sydney Wanderers	6–1	Adelaide United	Parramatta Stadium, Sydney
Friday 19:00 AEDT	Bridge 18', 45', 58'; Kresinger 45'; Ono 51'; Gibbs 90'	Report	Vidošić 68'	Attendance: 9,056; Referee: Jarred Gillett

21 December 2012	Brisbane Roar	0–1	Perth Glory	Suncorp Stadium, Brisbane
Friday 20:00 AEST		Report	McGarry 45'	Attendance: 11,352; Referee: Peter Green

22 December 2012	Wellington Phoenix	1–1	Central Coast Mariners	Westpac Stadium, Wellington
Saturday 17:00 NZDT	Sánchez 84'	Report	McBreen 45'	Attendance: 5,961; Referee: Peter O'Leary

22 December 2012	Newcastle Jets	2–1	Sydney FC	Hunter Stadium, Newcastle
Saturday 17:30 AEDT	Goodwin 13'; Heskey 27'	Report	Yau 32'	Attendance: 17,402; Referee: Strebre Delovski

22 December 2012	Melbourne Heart	1–2	Melbourne Victory	AAMI Park, Melbourne
Saturday 19:45 AEDT	Fred 81'	Report	Rojas 67'; Thompson 90+3'	Attendance: 26,457; Referee: Alan Milliner

==== Week 13 ====
26 December 2012	Adelaide United	0–1	Brisbane Roar	Hindmarsh Stadium, Adelaide
Wednesday 19:00 ACDT		Report	Henrique 65'	Attendance: 11,035; Referee: Adam Kersey

27 December 2012	Wellington Phoenix	3–2	Melbourne Heart	Westpac Stadium, Wellington
Thursday 19:30 NZDT	Fenton 21'; Brockie 66' (pen.), 70'	Report	Mebrahtu 14'; Durante 16' (o.g.)	Attendance: 6,401; Referee: Shaun Evans

27 December 2012	Sydney FC	1–0	Central Coast Mariners	Allianz Stadium, Sydney
Thursday 19:30 AEDT	Emerton 89'	Report		Attendance: 16,887; Referee: Peter Green

27 December 2012	Perth Glory	1–1	Western Sydney Wanderers	Patersons Stadium, Perth
Thursday 18:45 AWST	Ward 87'	Report	Haliti 38'	Attendance: 9,236; Referee: Ben Williams

28 December 2012	Melbourne Victory	3–2	Newcastle Jets	AAMI Park, Melbourne
Friday 19:30 AEDT	Rojas 33', 74'; Thompson 44'	Report	Zadkovich 63'; Heskey 72'	Attendance: 21,054; Referee: Kris Griffiths-Jones

==== Week 14 ====
31 December 2012	Central Coast Mariners	1–0	Perth Glory	Bluetongue Stadium, Gosford
Monday 18:00 AEDT	Ibini-Isei 68'	Report		Attendance: 14,591; Referee: Strebre Delovski

31 December 2012	Adelaide United	3–0	Sydney FC	Hindmarsh Stadium, Adelaide
Monday 19:30 ACDT	Vidosic 18' (pen.), 28'; Ramsay 61'	Report		Attendance: 10,934; Referee: Jarred Gillett

1 January 2013	Melbourne Heart	2–1	Newcastle Jets	AAMI Park, Melbourne
Tuesday 16:00 AEDT	Mebrahtu 6'; Tadic 25' (pen.)	Report	Griffiths 18' (pen.)	Attendance: 5,641; Referee: Chris Beath

1 January 2013	Western Sydney Wanderers	2–1	Melbourne Victory	Parramatta Stadium, Sydney
Tuesday 18:15 AEDT	Ono 42', 79'	Report	Dilevski 72'	Attendance: 13,659; Referee: Lucian Laverdure

1 January 2013	Brisbane Roar	2–1	Wellington Phoenix	Suncorp Stadium, Brisbane
Tuesday 19:30 AEST	Berisha 14'; Halloran 59'	Report	Brockie 37'	Attendance: 11,358; Referee: Tim McGilchrist

==== Week 15 ====
5 January 2013	Newcastle Jets	0–0	Adelaide United	Hunter Stadium, Newcastle
Saturday 17:30 AEDT		Report		Attendance: 10,721; Referee: Matthew Gillett

5 January 2013	Perth Glory	2–2	Sydney FC	nib Stadium, Perth
Saturday 18:45 AWST	Smeltz 39', 80'	Report	Culina 63'; Ryall 82'	Attendance: 9,817; Referee: Kris Griffith-Jones

5 January 2013	Melbourne Victory	2–0	Wellington Phoenix	AAMI Park, Melbourne
Saturday 19:45 AEDT	Flores 43'; Rojas 52'	Report		Attendance: 18,609; Referee: Ben Williams

6 January 2013	Melbourne Heart	3–2	Brisbane Roar	AAMI Park, Melbourne
Sunday 16:00 AEDT	Williams 13'; Tadic 35'; Fred 53'	Report	Berisha 74' (pen.), 76'	Attendance: 6,303; Referee: Alan Milliner

6 January 2013	Western Sydney Wanderers	0–2	Central Coast Mariners	Parramatta Stadium, Sydney
Sunday 18:00 AEDT		Report	Daniel McBreen 41', 90+6'	Attendance: 16,387; Referee: Chris Beath

==== Week 16 ====
11 January 2013	Adelaide United	3–2	Perth Glory	Hindmarsh Stadium, Adelaide
Friday 19:00 ACDT	Neumann 28', 36'; Ramsay 46'	Report	Smeltz 89' (pen.); McGarry 90+2'	Attendance: 10,129; Referee: Peter Green

12 January 2013	Melbourne Victory	1–1	Central Coast Mariners	Aurora Stadium, Launceston
Saturday 17:30 AEDT	Flores 41'	Report	McBreen 76' (pen.)	Attendance: 6,238; Referee: Jarred Gillett

12 January 2013	Newcastle Jets	1–0	Brisbane Roar	Hunter Stadium, Newcastle
Saturday 19:45 AEDT	Griffiths 47'	Report		Attendance: 10,164; Referee: Strebre Delovski

13 January 2013	Wellington Phoenix	0–2	Western Sydney Wanderers	Westpac Stadium, Wellington
Sunday 16:30 NZDT		Report	Topor-Stanley 72'; Haliti 82'	Attendance: 6,608; Referee: Shaun Evans

13 January 2013	Sydney FC	2–1	Melbourne Heart	Allianz Stadium, Sydney
Sunday 17:00 AEDT	Emerton 85'; Grant 90+3'	Report	Garcia 24'	Attendance: 13,125; Referee: Peter O'Leary

==== Week 17 ====
18 January 2013	Melbourne Heart	2–0	Adelaide United	AAMI Park, Melbourne
Friday 19:30 AEDT	Tadic 4'; Garcia 49'	Report		Attendance: 7,181; Referee: Lucien Laverdure

19 January 2013	Sydney FC	7–1	Wellington Phoenix	Allianz Stadium, Sydney
Saturday 17:30 AEDT	J. Griffiths 10'; Del Piero 20', 22' (pen.), 38', 69'; Culina 26'; Yau 83'	Report	Sigmund 79'	Attendance: 12,691; Referee: Kris Griffith-Jones

19 January 2013	Perth Glory	0–1	Melbourne Victory	nib Stadium, Perth
Saturday 18:45 AWST		Report	Jamieson 24' (o.g.)	Attendance: 7,603; Referee: Regis Queffelec

19 January 2013	Central Coast Mariners	0–0	Newcastle Jets	Bluetongue Stadium, Gosford
Saturday 19:45 AEDT		Report		Attendance: 11,249; Referee: Alan Milliner

20 January 2013	Brisbane Roar	1–2	Western Sydney Wanderers	Suncorp Stadium, Brisbane
Sunday 16:00 AEST	Nichols 22'	Report	Bridge 65'; Hersi 70'	Attendance: 11,917; Referee: Matthew Gillett

==== Week 18 ====
25 January 2013	Central Coast Mariners	3–1	Adelaide United	Bluetongue Stadium, Gosford
Friday 19:30 AEDT	Duke 67', 72'; McGlinchey 88'	Report	Bowles 39'	Attendance: 8,294; Referee: Peter O'Leary

26 January 2013	Melbourne Victory	3–1	Sydney FC	AAMI Park, Melbourne
Saturday 17:30 AEDT	Ryall 22' (o.g.); Thompson 66'; Rojas 71'	Report	J. Griffiths 74'	Attendance: 26,882; Referee: Chris Beath

26 January 2013	Western Sydney Wanderers	1–0	Melbourne Heart	Parramatta Stadium, Sydney
Saturday 19:45 AEST	Ono 73' (pen.)	Report		Attendance: 14,624; Referee: Strebre Delovski

26 January 2013	Perth Glory	0–1	Brisbane Roar	nib Stadium, Perth
Saturday 18:45 AWST		Report	Meyer 15'	Attendance: 4,821; Referee: Alan Milliner

27 January 2013	Wellington Phoenix	1–1	Newcastle Jets	Westpac Stadium, Wellington
Sunday 16:30 NZDT	Fenton 20'	Report	Heskey 72'	Attendance: 6,429; Referee: Ben Williams

==== Week 19 ====
1 February 2013	Brisbane Roar	2–2	Central Coast Mariners	Suncorp Stadium, Brisbane
Friday 19:00 AEST	Berisha 47', 69'	Report	McGlinchey 8'; McBreen 80'	Attendance: 10,604; Referee: Lucien Laverdure

2 February 2013	Wellington Phoenix	1–0	Perth Glory	Eden Park, Auckland
Saturday 17:00 NZDT	Brockie 42'	Report		Attendance: 11,566; Referee: Adam Kersey

2 February 2013	Newcastle Jets	2–2	Sydney FC	Hunter Stadium, Newcastle
Saturday 17:30 AEDT	Griffiths 15' (pen.), 89' (pen.)	Report	Del Piero 12'; Powell 57'	Attendance: 12,428; Referee: Jarred Gillett

2 February 2013	Melbourne Victory	2–1	Melbourne Heart	Etihad Stadium, Melbourne
Saturday 19:45 AEDT	Thompson 29'; Milligan 56' (pen.)	Report	Williams 73'	Attendance: 41,203; Referee: Strebre Delovski

3 February 2013	Adelaide United	2–4	Western Sydney Wanderers	Hindmarsh Stadium, Adelaide
Sunday 16:30 ACDT	Djite 61'; Ramsay 87'	Report	Hersi 43', 52'; Bridge 45'; Poljak 68'	Attendance: 9,686; Referee: Chris Beath

==== Week 20 ====
7 February 2013	Central Coast Mariners	5–0	Wellington Phoenix	Bluetongue Stadium, Gosford
Thursday 19:00 AEDT	Ibini-Isei 30', 84'; Hutchinson 65'; McBreen 69'; Duke 89'	Report		Attendance: 6,774; Referee: Kris Griffiths-Jones

8 February 2013	Adelaide United	1–0	Melbourne Victory	Hindmarsh Stadium, Adelaide
Friday 19:00 ACDT	Neumann 43'	Report		Attendance: 12,029; Referee: Jarred Gillett

9 February 2013	Melbourne Heart	2–0	Perth Glory	AAMI Park, Melbourne
Saturday 17:30 AEDT	Kalmar 23'; Babalj 56'	Report		Attendance: 6,096; Referee: Alan Milliner

9 February 2013	Western Sydney Wanderers	2–1	Newcastle Jets	Campbelltown Stadium, Campbelltown
Saturday 19:45 AEDT	Hersi 45'; Bridge 83'	Report	Zadkovich 90'	Attendance: 10,589; Referee: Peter Green

10 February 2013	Sydney FC	2–1	Brisbane Roar	Allianz Stadium, Sydney
Sunday 17:00 AEDT	Del Piero 7'; Triantis 69'	Report	Berisha 45' (pen.)	Attendance: 14,589; Referee: Ben Williams

==== Week 21 ====
15 February 2013	Newcastle Jets	2–0	Melbourne Heart	Hunter Stadium, Newcastle
Friday 19:30 AEDT	Heskey 10'; Griffiths 81'	Report		Attendance: 11,396; Referee: Chris Beath

16 February 2013	Sydney FC	2–1	Adelaide United	Allianz Stadium, Sydney
Saturday 17:30 AEDT	Antonis 49'; Powell 67'	Report	Juric 78'	Attendance: 15,602; Referee: Strebre Delovski

16 February 2013	Perth Glory	2–1	Central Coast Mariners	nib Stadium, Perth
Saturday 18:45 AWST	Dodd 27'; Smeltz 65'	Report	Ibini-Isei 13'	Attendance: 5,909; Referee: Jarred Gillett

16 February 2013	Melbourne Victory	1–2	Western Sydney Wanderers	AAMI Park, Melbourne
Saturday 19:45 AEDT	Pain 75'	Report	La Rocca 11'; Ono 72'	Attendance: 21,638; Referee: Peter Green

17 February 2013	Brisbane Roar	2–0	Wellington Phoenix	Suncorp Stadium, Brisbane
Sunday 16:00 AEST	Lustica 33'; Berisha 49'	Report		Attendance: 9,282; Referee: Alan Milliner

==== Week 22 ====
22 February 2013	Newcastle Jets	0–0	Brisbane Roar	Hunter Stadium, Newcastle
Friday 19:30 AEDT		Report		Attendance: 8,310; Referee: Lucien Laverdue

23 February 2013	Western Sydney Wanderers	1–0	Perth Glory	Parramatta Stadium, Sydney
Saturday 17:30 AEST	Mooy 58'	Report		Attendance: 11,772; Referee: Ben Williams

23 February 2013	Central Coast Mariners	6–2	Melbourne Victory	Bluetongue Stadium, Gosford
Saturday 19:45 AEDT	Duke 18', 32'; McGlinchey 57', 87', 90'; Fitzgerald 81'	Report	Milligan 23' (pen.); Sainsbury 68' (o.g.)	Attendance: 6,081; Referee: Strebre Delovski

24 February 2013	Wellington Phoenix	2–2	Adelaide United	Westpac Stadium, Wellington
Sunday 16:30 NZDT	Brockie 31'; Gameiro 80'	Report	Juric 20'; Carrusca 34'	Attendance: 4,892; Referee: Tim McGilchrist

24 February 2013	Melbourne Heart	3–1	Sydney FC	AAMI Park, Melbourne
Sunday 17:00 AEDT	Kalmar 31'; Germano 36'; Williams 55' (pen.)	Report	J. Griffiths 58'	Attendance: 13,752; Referee: Alan Milliner

==== Week 23 ====
2 March 2013	Adelaide United	0–1	Brisbane Roar	Hindmarsh Stadium, Adelaide
Saturday 17:00 ACDT		Report	Halloran 82'	Attendance: 6,878; Referee: Shaun Evans

2 March 2013	Central Coast Mariners	0–1	Western Sydney Wanderers	Bluetongue Stadium, Gosford
Saturday 19:45 AEDT		Report	Haliti 81'	Attendance: 18,721; Referee: Alan Milliner

2 March 2013	Perth Glory	2–1	Sydney FC	nib Stadium, Perth
Saturday 18:45 AWST	Harold 20'; Smeltz 35'	Report	Del Piero 29'	Attendance: 8,378; Referee: Strebre Delovski

3 March 2013	Wellington Phoenix	1–0	Melbourne Heart	Forsyth Barr Stadium, Dunedin
Sunday 16:30 NZDT	Brockie 19'	Report		Attendance: 3,060; Referee: Brenton Hayward

3 March 2013	Melbourne Victory	5–0	Newcastle Jets	AAMI Park, Melbourne
Sunday 17:00 AEDT	Rojas 8', 65'; Leijer 15'; Milligan 30' (pen.), 57' (pen.)	Report		Attendance: 17,778; Referee: Jarred Gillett

==== Week 24 ====
8 March 2013	Newcastle Jets	1–2	Perth Glory	Hunter Stadium, Newcastle
Friday 19:30 AEDT	Taggart 45+2'	Report	Córdoba 24'; Thwaite 90'	Attendance: 10,807; Referee: Adam Kersey

9 March 2013	Sydney FC	2–0	Central Coast Mariners	Allianz Stadium, Sydney
Saturday 17:30 AEDT	Ryall 25'; Chianese 73'	Report		Attendance: 16,155; Referee: Jarred Gillett

9 March 2013	Brisbane Roar	1–1	Melbourne Victory	Suncorp Stadium, Brisbane
Saturday 21:45 AEDT	Franjic 60'	Report	Broxham 11'	Attendance: 12,624; Referee: Peter Green

10 March 2013	Western Sydney Wanderers	2–1	Wellington Phoenix	Parramatta Stadium, Sydney
Sunday 17:00 AEST	Ono 8' (pen.); Bridge 49' (pen.)	Report	Brockie 22'	Attendance: 15,809; Referee: Strebre Delovski

11 March 2013	Melbourne Heart	0–2	Adelaide United	AAMI Park, Melbourne
Monday 19:30 AEDT		Report	Vidošić 40' (pen.); Ramsay 53'	Attendance: 5,393; Referee: Chris Beath

==== Week 25 ====
15 March 2013	Adelaide United	1–1	Newcastle Jets	Hindmarsh Stadium, Adelaide
Friday 19:00 ACDT	Carrusca 49'	Report	Bridges 44'	Attendance: 7,284; Referee: Lucien Laverdue

16 March 2013	Melbourne Heart	1–3	Western Sydney Wanderers	AAMI Park, Melbourne
Saturday 17:30 AEDT	Mebrahtu 39'	Report	Haliti 28', 60'; La Rocca 89'	Attendance: 6,101; Referee: Ben Williams

16 March 2013	Sydney FC	1–1	Melbourne Victory	Allianz Stadium, Sydney
Saturday 19:45 AEDT	Yau 85'	Report	Milligan 3'	Attendance: 22,233; Referee: Strebre Delovski

17 March 2013	Perth Glory	1–2	Wellington Phoenix	nib Stadium, Perth
Sunday 16:00 AWST	Nagai 76'	Report	Ifill 35'; Huysegems 67'	Attendance: 6,360; Referee: Tim McGilchrist

17 March 2013	Central Coast Mariners	1–0	Brisbane Roar	Bluetongue Stadium, Gosford
Sunday 17:00 AEDT	Ibini-Isei 34'	Report		Attendance: 7,225; Referee: Alan Milliner

==== Week 26 ====
27 February 2013	Wellington Phoenix	1–2	Newcastle Jets	Westpac Stadium, Wellington
Wednesday 19:00 NZDT	Brockie 60'	Report	Taggart 19'; Bridges 44'	Attendance: 4,025; Referee: Kris Griffiths-Jones

23 March 2013	Melbourne Victory	2–3	Perth Glory	AAMI Park, Melbourne
Saturday 17:30 AEDT	Leijer 13'; Cristaldo 89'	Report	Harold 21'; Dodd 38'; Risdon 90+4'	Attendance: 16,839; Referee: Peter O'Leary

23 March 2013	Western Sydney Wanderers	1–1	Sydney FC	Parramatta Stadium, Sydney
Saturday 19:45 AEDT	Cole 70'	Report	Del Piero 34'	Attendance: 19,585; Referee: Alan Milliner

24 March 2013	Brisbane Roar	2–0	Melbourne Heart	Suncorp Stadium, Brisbane
Sunday 16:00 AEST	Berisha 12' (pen.); Broich 31'	Report		Attendance: 9,869; Referee: Jarred Gillett

24 March 2013	Adelaide United	0–2	Central Coast Mariners	Hindmarsh Stadium, Adelaide
Sunday 18:30 ACDT		Report	McBreen 4'; Sterjovski 90+4'	Attendance: 8,069; Referee: Kris Griffiths-Jones

==== Week 27 ====
28 March 2013	Brisbane Roar	3–1	Sydney FC	Suncorp Stadium, Brisbane
Thursday 19:00 AEST	Berisha 30'; Lustica 51'; Franjic 79'	Report	Del Piero 84' (pen.)	Attendance: 19,010; Referee: Peter Green

29 March 2013	Newcastle Jets	0–3	Western Sydney Wanderers	Hunter Stadium, Newcastle
Friday 17:30 AEDT		Report	Bridge 6', 33'; Visconte 80'	Attendance: 22,518; Referee: Ben Williams

30 March 2013	Central Coast Mariners	2–1	Melbourne Heart	Bluetongue Stadium, Gosford
Saturday 17:30 AEDT	McBreen 35' (pen.); Duke 63'	Report	Garcia 73'	Attendance: 8,271; Referee: Jarred Gillett

30 March 2013	Perth Glory	1–1	Adelaide United	nib Stadium, Perth
Saturday 18:45 AWST	Zahra 58'	Report	Barker-Daish 90'	Attendance: 16,707; Referee: Kris Griffiths-Jones

31 March 2013	Wellington Phoenix	2–3	Melbourne Victory	Westpac Stadium, Wellington
Sunday 16:30 NZDT	Huysegems 64'; Brockie 66'	Report	Rojas 10'; Flores 56'; Thompson 83'	Attendance: 6,813; Referee: Adam Kersey

=== Table of results ===
Abbreviation and Colour Key: Adelaide United – AU; Brisbane Roar – BR; Central Coast Mariners – CCM; Melbourne Heart – MH; Melbourne Victory – MV; Newcastle Jets – NJ; Perth Glory – PG; Sydney FC – SFC; Wellington Phoenix – WP; Western Sydney Wanderers – WSW; Win; Loss; Draw; Home
Club	Match																										
Club	1	2	3	4	5	6	7	8	9	10	11	12	13	14	15	16	17	18	19	20	21	22	23	24	25	26	27
Adelaide United	NUJ	WSW	MV	WP	BR	PG	MH	SFC	CCM	MV	WP	WSW	BR	SFC	NUJ	PG	MH	CCM	WSW	MV	SFC	WP	BR	MH	NUJ	CCM	PG
Adelaide United	0–2	1–0	2–1	3–1	0–1	1–1	1–0	1–2	2–1	4–2	3–1	6–1	0–1	3–0	0–0	3–2	2–0	3–1	2–4	1–0	2–1	2–2	0–1	0–2	1–1	0–2	1–1
Brisbane Roar	PG	MV	WP	WSW	AU	MH	SFC	CCM	NUJ	WSW	MV	PG	AU	WP	MH	NUJ	WSW	PG	CCM	SFC	WP	NUJ	AU	MV	CCM	MH	SFC
Brisbane Roar	1–0	5–0	1–1	0–1	0–1	4–1	4–2	2–1	1–0	1–0	1–1	0–1	0–1	2–1	3–2	1–0	1–2	0–1	2–2	2–1	2–0	0–0	0–1	1–1	1–0	2–0	3–1
Central Coast Mariners	WSW	PG	NUJ	MH	SFC	WP	MV	BR	AU	NUJ	MH	WP	SFC	PG	WSW	MV	NUJ	AU	BR	WP	PG	MV	WSW	SFC	BR	AU	MH
Central Coast Mariners	0–0	1–0	2–1	0–1	7–2	0–1	2–2	2–1	2–1	0–2	2–0	1–1	1–0	1–0	0–2	1–1	0–0	3–1	2–2	5–0	2–1	6–2	0–1	2–0	1–0	0–2	2–1
Melbourne Heart	MV	WP	PG	CCM	WSW	BR	AU	NUJ	SFC	PG	CCM	MV	WP	NUJ	BR	SFC	AU	WSW	MV	PG	NUJ	SFC	WP	AU	WSW	BR	CCM
Melbourne Heart	1–2	1–1	2–0	0–1	2–1	4–1	1–0	3–3	0–0	1–0	2–0	1–2	3–2	2–1	3–2	2–1	2–0	1–0	2–1	2–0	2–0	3–1	1–0	0–2	1–3	2–0	2–1
Melbourne Victory	MH	BR	AU	NUJ	WP	SFC	CCM	WSW	PG	AU	BR	MH	NUJ	WSW	WP	CCM	PG	SFC	MH	AU	WSW	CCM	NUJ	BR	SFC	PG	WP
Melbourne Victory	1–2	5–0	2–1	2–1	3–2	2–3	2–2	0–2	1–0	4–2	1–1	1–2	3–2	2–1	2–0	1–1	0–1	3–1	2–1	1–0	1–2	6–2	5–0	1–1	1–1	2–3	2–3
Newcastle Jets	AU	SFC	CCM	MV	PG	WSW	WP	MH	BR	CCM	PG	SFC	MV	MH	AU	BR	CCM	WP	SFC	WSW	MH	BR	WP	MV	PG	AU	WSW
Newcastle Jets	0–2	2–3	2–1	2–1	3–2	1–2	0–3	3–3	1–0	0–2	3–0	2–1	3–2	2–1	0–0	1–0	0–0	1–1	2–2	2–1	2–0	0–0	1–2	5–0	1–2	1–1	0–3
Perth Glory	BR	CCM	MH	SFC	NUJ	AU	WSW	WP	MV	MH	NUJ	BR	WSW	CCM	SFC	AU	MV	BR	WP	MH	CCM	WSW	SFC	NUJ	WP	MV	AU
Perth Glory	1–0	1–0	2–0	2–1	3–2	1–1	0–1	1–1	1–0	1–0	3–0	0–1	1–1	1–0	2–2	3–2	0–1	0–1	1–0	2–0	2–1	1–0	2–1	1–2	1–2	2–3	1–1
Sydney FC	WP	NUJ	WSW	PG	CCM	MV	BR	AU	MH	WP	WSW	NUJ	CCM	AU	PG	MH	WP	MV	NUJ	BR	AU	MH	PG	CCM	MV	WSW	BR
Sydney FC	2–0	2–3	0–1	2–1	7–2	2–3	4–2	1–2	0–0	1–2	0–2	2–1	1–0	3–0	2–2	2–1	7–1	3–1	2–2	2–1	2–1	3–1	2–1	2–0	1–1	1–1	3–1
Wellington Phoenix	SFC	MH	BR	AU	MV	CCM	NUJ	PG	WSW	SFC	AU	CCM	MH	BR	MV	WSW	SFC	NUJ	PG	CCM	BR	AU	NUJ	MH	WSW	PG	MV
Wellington Phoenix	2–0	1–1	1–1	3–1	3–2	0–1	0–3	1–1	1–0	1–2	3–1	1–1	3–2	2–1	2–0	0–2	7–1	1–1	1–0	5–0	2–0	2–2	1–2	1–0	2–1	1–2	2–3
Western Sydney Wanderers	CCM	AU	SFC	BR	MH	NUJ	PG	MV	WP	BR	SFC	AU	PG	MV	CCM	WP	BR	MH	AU	NUJ	MV	PG	CCM	WP	MH	SFC	NUJ
Western Sydney Wanderers	0–0	1–0	0–1	0–1	2–1	1–2	0–1	0–2	1–0	1–0	0–2	6–1	1–1	2–1	0–2	0–2	1–2	1–0	2–4	2–1	1–2	1–0	0–1	2–1	1–3	1–1	0–3

== Finals series ==
In its eighth season the A-League has adopted a new knock-out format for the finals with six teams competing over a three-week series climaxing in the decider. As a result, the play-offs have been reduced from four to three weeks and the top two teams no longer receive a double chance. Instead they will get the opening week of the final series off and will only need to win one game to make the grand final.

Elimination-finals
Adelaide United	1
Brisbane Roar	2
Melbourne Victory (a.e.t.)	2
Perth Glory	1

Semi-finals
Western Sydney Wanderers	2
Brisbane Roar	0
Central Coast Mariners	1
Melbourne Victory	0

Grand Final
Western Sydney Wanderers	0
Central Coast Mariners	2

=== Elimination-finals ===
5 April 2013
19:30 AEDT

Melbourne Victory	2–1 (a.e.t.)	Perth Glory
Milligan 90+1' (pen.); Thompson 95'	Report	Nagai 15'

Etihad Stadium, Melbourne
Attendance: 22,902
Referee: Jarred Gillett

7 April 2013
16:30 ACST

Adelaide United	1–2	Brisbane Roar
Vidošić 89'	Report	Brattan 28'; Franjic 45+2'

Hindmarsh Stadium, Adelaide
Attendance: 10,234
Referee: Chris Beath

=== Semi-finals ===
12 April 2013
19:30 AEST

Western Sydney Wanderers	2–0	Brisbane Roar
Kresinger 16'; Ono 71'	Report

Parramatta Stadium, Sydney
Attendance: 19,369
Referee: Alan Milliner

14 April 2013
17:00 AEST

Central Coast Mariners	1–0	Melbourne Victory
McBreen 42'	Report

Bluetongue Stadium, Gosford
Attendance: 10,651
Referee: Strebre Delovski

=== Grand Final ===
21 April 2013
16:00 AEST

Western Sydney Wanderers	0–2	Central Coast Mariners
	Report	Zwaanswijk 44'; McBreen 68' (pen.)

Allianz Stadium, Sydney
Attendance: 42,102
Referee: Peter Green

== Season statistics ==
=== Top scorers ===
As of matches played on 31 March 2013

Rank	Player	Club	Goals
1	(Australia) Daniel McBreen	Central Coast Mariners	17
2	(New Zealand) Jeremy Brockie	Wellington Phoenix	16
3	(New Zealand) Marco Rojas	Melbourne Victory	15
4	(Albania) Besart Berisha	Brisbane Roar	14
4	(Italy) Alessandro Del Piero	Sydney FC	14
6	(Australia) Mark Bridge	Western Sydney Wanderers	11
7	(Australia) Ryan Griffiths	Newcastle Jets	9
7	(England) Emile Heskey	Newcastle Jets	9
7	(Australia) Dario Vidošić	Adelaide United	9
10	(Australia) Mark Milligan	Melbourne Victory	8
10	(Australia) Archie Thompson	Melbourne Victory	8

==== Own goals ====
Player		Team	Against	Week
(Liberia)	Patrick Gerhardt	Melbourne Heart	Western Sydney Wanderers	5
(Australia)	Sebastian Ryall	Sydney FC	Central Coast Mariners	5
(Australia)	Michael Beauchamp	Western Sydney Wanderers	Melbourne Victory	8
(Australia)	Andrew Durante	Wellington Phoenix	Melbourne Heart	13
(Australia)	Scott Jamieson	Perth Glory	Melbourne Victory	17
(Australia)	Sebastian Ryall	Sydney FC	Melbourne Victory	18
(Australia)	Trent Sainsbury	Central Coast Mariners	Melbourne Victory	22

=== Attendances ===
These are the attendance records of each of the teams at the end of the home and away season. The table does not include finals series attendances.

Team	Hosted	Average	High	Low	Total
Melbourne Victory	14	21,885	42,032	16,839	306,396
Sydney FC	13	18,637	35,419	12,425	242,278
Brisbane Roar	13	13,417	22,970	9,282	174,415
Newcastle Jets	13	13,388	22,518	8,310	174,043
Western Sydney Wanderers	14	12,466	19,585	6,755	174,520
Central Coast Mariners	13	9,921	18,721	6,081	128,974
Adelaide United	14	9,592	14,115	6,878	134,287
Perth Glory	14	8,819	16,707	4,821	123,466
Melbourne Heart	13	8,560	26,457	4,505	111,284
Wellington Phoenix	14	6,882	12,057	3,060	96,342
League total	135	12,341	42,032	3,060	1,666,005

Updated to 3 February 2013

==== Top 10 Season Attendances ====
Attendance	Round	Date	Home	Score	Away	Venue	Weekday	Time of Day
42,102	GF	21 April 2013	Western Sydney Wanderers	0–2	Central Coast Mariners	Allianz Stadium	Sunday	Afternoon
42,032	1	5 October 2012	Melbourne Victory	1–2	Melbourne Heart	Etihad Stadium	Friday	Night
41,203	19	2 February 2013	Melbourne Victory	2–1	Melbourne Heart	Etihad Stadium	Saturday	Night
35,419	2	13 October 2012	Sydney FC	2–3	Newcastle Jets	Allianz Stadium	Saturday	Dusk
26,882	18	26 January 2013	Melbourne Victory	3–1	Sydney FC	AAMI Park	Saturday	Dusk
26,457	12	22 December 2012	Melbourne Heart	1–2	Melbourne Victory	AAMI Park	Saturday	Night
26,176	11	15 December 2012	Sydney FC	0–2	Western Sydney Wanderers	Allianz Stadium	Saturday	Night
22,970	7	16 November 2012	Brisbane Roar	4–2	Sydney FC	Suncorp Stadium	Friday	Night
22,902	EF	5 April 2013	Melbourne Victory	2–1	Perth Glory	Etihad Stadium	Friday	Night
22,518	27	29 March 2013	Newcastle Jets	0–3	Western Sydney Wanderers	Hunter Stadium	Friday	Dusk

=== Discipline ===
The Fair Play Award will go to the team with the lowest points on the fair play ladder at the conclusion of the home and away season.

1 point	Yellow Card
2 points	Second Caution Red Card
3 points	Direct Red Card

Team	Yellow card	Yellow card Yellow card Red card	Red card	Points
Adelaide United	32	0	0	32
Brisbane Roar	30	1	0	32
Central Coast Mariners	30	2	1	37
Melbourne Heart	37	0	1	40
Melbourne Victory	43	1	1	48
Newcastle Jets	44	2	1	51
Perth Glory	40	2	1	47
Sydney FC	45	1	0	47
Wellington Phoenix	29	1	1	34
Western Sydney Wanderers	35	1	2	43
Totals	365	11	8	

Current as of 5 January 2013

Notes

- Brisbane Roar's Thomas Broich was given a straight red card that was later rescinded by the Match Review Panel.

== Awards ==
=== End-of-season awards ===
- Johnny Warren Medal – (New Zealand) Marco Rojas, Melbourne Victory
- NAB Young Footballer of the Year – (New Zealand) Marco Rojas, Melbourne Victory
- Nike Golden Boot Award – (Australia) Daniel McBreen, Central Coast Mariners, 17 Goals
- Goalkeeper of the Year – (Australia) Ante Covic, Western Sydney Wanderers
- Manager of the Year – (Australia) Tony Popovic, Western Sydney Wanderers
- Fair Play Award – Brisbane Roar
- Referee of the Year – (Australia) Peter Green
- Goal of the Year – (Argentina) Marcos Flores, Melbourne Victory (Melbourne Victory v Wellington Phoenix, 05-Nov-12)

=== Team of the season ===
Formation: 4–3–3

Position	Name	Club
GK	(Australia) Ante Covic	Western Sydney Wanderers
RB	(Germany) Jérome Polenz	Western Sydney Wanderers
CB	(Australia) Trent Sainsbury	Central Coast Mariners
CB	(Australia) Nikolai Topor-Stanley	Western Sydney Wanderers
LB	(Ivory Coast) Adama Traoré	Melbourne Victory
RM	(Japan) Shinji Ono	Western Sydney Wanderers
CM	(Australia) Mark Milligan (Captain)	Melbourne Victory
LM	(New Zealand) Michael McGlinchey	Central Coast Mariners
RF	(New Zealand) Jeremy Brockie	Wellington Phoenix
ST	(Italy) Alessandro Del Piero	Sydney FC
LF	(New Zealand) Marco Rojas	Melbourne Victory
Coach	(Australia) Tony Popovic	Western Sydney Wanderers
Substitutes:
GK	(Australia) Eugene Galekovic	Adelaide United
CB	(Australia) Michael Thwaite	Perth Glory
CM	(Argentina) Marcelo Carrusca	Adelaide United
ST	(Australia) Archie Thompson	Melbourne Victory
ST	(Australia) Daniel McBreen	Central Coast Mariners

== See also ==
- 2012–13 Adelaide United FC season
- 2012–13 Brisbane Roar FC season
- 2012–13 Central Coast Mariners FC season
- 2012–13 Melbourne Heart FC season
- 2012–13 Melbourne Victory FC season
- 2012–13 Newcastle Jets FC season
- 2012–13 Perth Glory FC season
- 2012–13 Sydney FC season
- 2012–13 Wellington Phoenix FC season
- 2012–13 Western Sydney Wanderers FC season
