= Luke Pavlou =

Australian soccer player

Personal information
- Full name: Luke Pavlou
- Date of birth: 26 August 1996 (age 30)
- Place of birth: Australia
- Height: 1.83 m (6 ft 0 in)
- Position: Central midfielder

Team information
- Current team: Malvern City

Youth career
- Mt Gravatt
- –2013: Eastern Suburbs
- 2014–2016: Brisbane Roar

Senior career*
Years	Team	Apps	(Gls)
2013	Eastern Suburbs	15	(0)
2014–2016	Brisbane Roar NPL	27	(0)
2015–2016	Brisbane Roar	2	(0)
2016	Brisbane City	21	(0)
2017–2018	South Melbourne	39	(0)
2018–2019	Oakleigh Cannons	42	(1)
2020–2021	South Melbourne	20	(0)
2022–2023	Bulleen Lions	22	(1)
2023	→ Dandenong Thunder (loan)	8	(0)
2024	Bentleigh Greens	8	(0)
2024–2025	Western Suburbs	15	(1)
2025–	Malvern City	11	(0)
- * Club domestic league appearances and goals as of 28 June 2025 ‡ National team caps and goals as of 18 April 2015

Luke Pavlou is an Australian professional footballer who currently plays as a central midfielder for Victorian State League side Malvern City FC.

== Career ==
=== Brisbane Roar FC ===
He made his professional debut on 18 April 2015 for Brisbane Roar FC against Melbourne Victory.

=== Brisbane City FC ===
After his departure from Brisbane Roar he signed for National Premier Leagues Queensland side Brisbane City FC under Head Coach John Kosmina for the 2016 season.

=== South Melbourne FC ===
Following on from his season at Brisbane City, Pavlou signed with National Premier Leagues Victoria giants South Melbourne FC until the end of the 2019 NPL Victoria season. He made 39 league appearances for South Melbourne and featured heavily in their 2017 FFA Cup run which culminated in a 5-2 defeat to the reigning A-League champions, Sydney FC in the semi-final.

=== Oakleigh Cannons FC ===
On 28 May 2018, NPL Victoria side Oakleigh Cannons announced the signing of Pavlou until the end of the 2018 NPL Victoria season.

=== South Melbourne FC ===
Pavlou returned to South Melbourne for the 2020 NPL Victoria Season.
