= Marcel Meeuwis =

Dutch former professional footballer (born 1980)

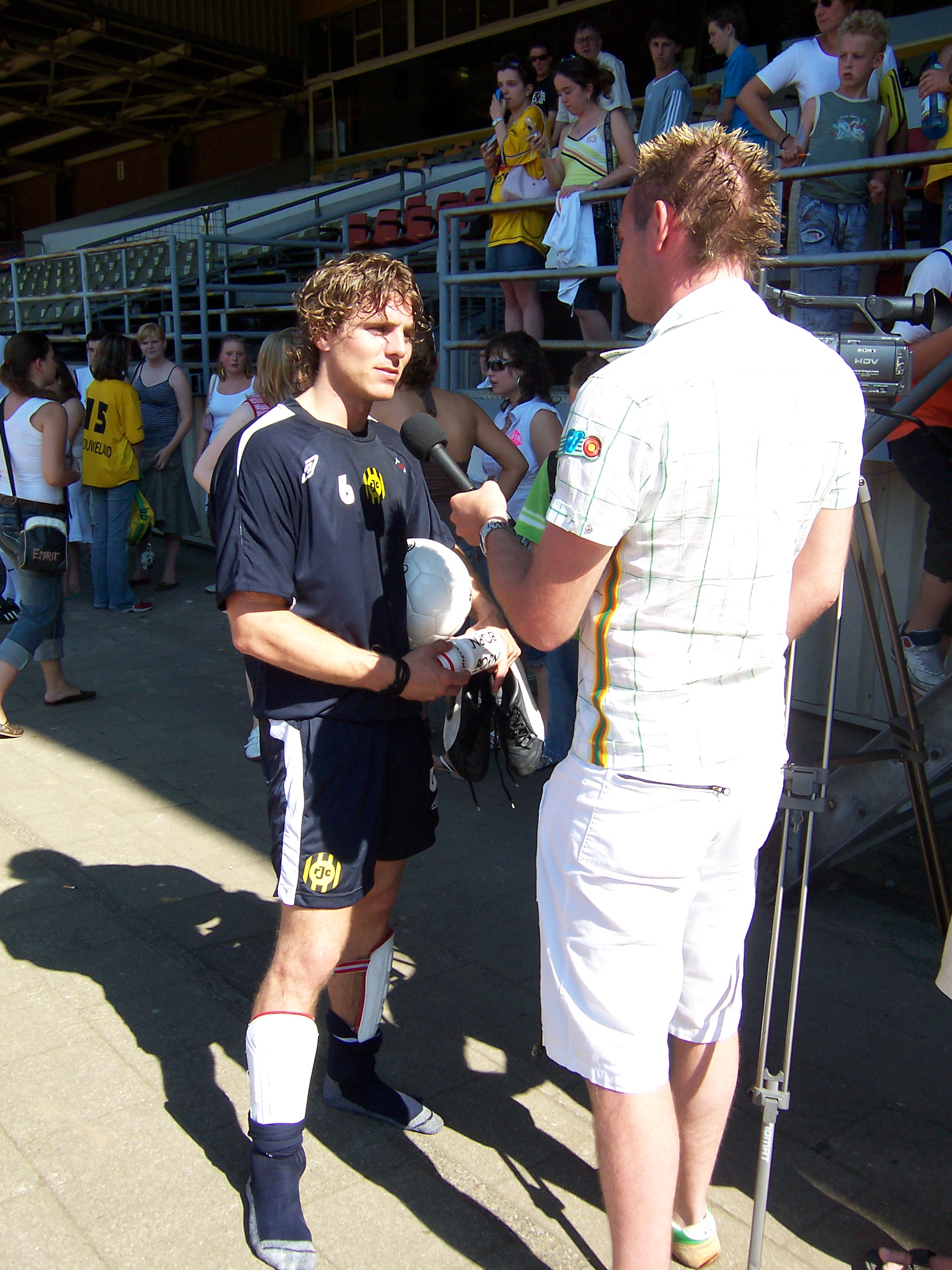
- Meeuwis in 2006

Personal information
- Full name: Marcel Meeuwis
- Date of birth: 31 October 1980 (age 46)
- Place of birth: Goirle, Netherlands
- Height: 1.72 m (5 ft 8 in)
- Position: Midfielder

Youth career
- Taxandria

Senior career*
Years	Team	Apps	(Gls)
2000–2004	Willem II	6	(0)
2002–2003	→ VVV-Venlo (loan)	24	(5)
2003–2004	→ VVV-Venlo (loan)	34	(1)
2004–2006	VVV-Venlo	60	(4)
2006–2009	Roda JC	97	(11)
2009–2011	Borussia Mönchengladbach	20	(0)
2011	→ Feyenoord (loan)	13	(0)
2011–2012	VVV-Venlo	41	(0)
2013	Melbourne Heart	6	(0)
Total		301	(21)
- * Club domestic league appearances and goals

Marcel Meeuwis (born 31 October 1980) is a Dutch former professional footballer who played as a midfielder.

== Career ==
Meeuwis played for amateur club Taxandria, and made his debut in professional football in the 2000–01 season at Willem II. During his second season for Willem II, Meeuwis only played four games. In the summer of 2002, he moved to VVV-Venlo in the Eerste Divisie, where he played a larger number of matches. Meeuwis played for VVV for a total of four seasons, growing into one of the team's key players.

Meeuwis moved to Roda JC in the Eredivisie in 2006, where he signed a contract until 2012. He announced his transfer to Borussia Mönchengladbach for the up-coming season on 18 May 2009. He signed a three-year contract and joined his new club on 1 July 2009.

On 8 February 2013, it was announced he had signed with A-League club Melbourne Heart on a three-month contract.

== Career statistics ==
Appearances and goals by club, season and competition
Club	Season	League			Cup		Continental		Other		Total	
Club	Season	Division	Apps	Goals	Apps	Goals	Apps	Goals	Apps	Goals	Apps	Goals
Willem II	2000–01	Eredivisie	2	0	1	0	–		–		3	0
Willem II	2001–02	Eredivisie	4	0	1	0	–		–		5	0
Willem II	Total		6	0	2	0	0	0	0	0	8	0
VVV-Venlo	2002–03	Eerste Divisie	24	5	2	0	–		–		26	5
VVV-Venlo	2003–04	Eerste Divisie	34	1	2	0	–		6	0	42	1
VVV-Venlo	2004–05	Eerste Divisie	32	3	2	0	–		6	0	40	3
VVV-Venlo	2005–06	Eerste Divisie	28	1	3	1	–		2	0	33	2
VVV-Venlo	Total		118	10	9	1	0	0	14	0	141	11
Roda JC	2006–07	Eredivisie	33	2	3	0	–		2	0	38	2
Roda JC	2007–08	Eredivisie	31	6	5	2	–		2	0	38	8
Roda JC	2008–09	Eredivisie	33	3	3	0	–		4	0	40	3
Roda JC	Total		97	11	11	2	0	0	8	0	116	13
Borussia Mönchengladbach	2009–10	Bundesliga	18	0	0	0	0	0	–		18	0
Borussia Mönchengladbach	2010–11	Bundesliga	2	0	0	0	0	0	–		2	0
Borussia Mönchengladbach	Total		20	0	0	0	0	0	–		20	0
Feyenoord	2010–11	Eredivisie	13	0	0	0	0	0	–		13	0
VVV-Venlo	2011–12	Eredivisie	32	0	0	0	–		4	0	36	0
VVV-Venlo	2012–13	Eredivisie	9	0	1	0	–		0	0	10	0
VVV-Venlo	Total		41	0	1	0	0	0	4	0	46	0
Melbourne Heart	2012–13	A-League	6	0	0	0	0	0	–		6	0
Career total			301	21	23	3	0	0	26	0	350	24
