= Jérome Polenz =

German footballer (born 1986)

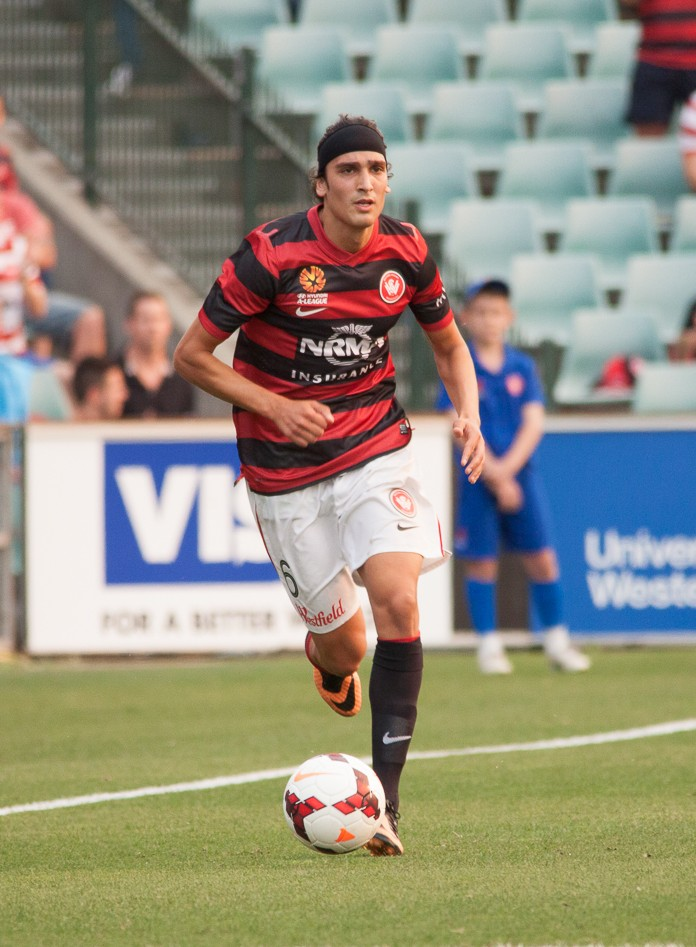
- Polenz in action for Western Sydney Wanderers

Personal information
- Date of birth: 7 November 1986 (age 40)
- Place of birth: Berlin, East Germany
- Height: 1.83 m (6 ft 0 in)
- Positions: Centre back; defensive midfielder; full-back

Youth career
- 1993–1997: SC Siemensstadt
- 1997–1998: CFC Hertha 06
- 1998–2002: TeBe Berlin
- 2002–2005: Werder Bremen

Senior career*
Years	Team	Apps	(Gls)
2004–2007	Werder Bremen II	64	(15)
2006–2007	Werder Bremen	3	(0)
2007–2008	Alemannia Aachen II	1	(0)
2007–2010	Alemannia Aachen	51	(0)
2010–2012	Union Berlin	14	(0)
2012–2014	Western Sydney Wanderers	47	(2)
2014	Sarpsborg 08	2	(0)
2015–2016	Brisbane Roar	12	(0)
Total		194	(17)

International career
	Germany U19	3	(0)
	Germany U20	1	(0)
- * Club domestic league appearances and goals

Jérome Polenz (born 7 November 1986) is a German retired professional footballer who mostly played as a defender.

== Club career ==
=== Early career ===
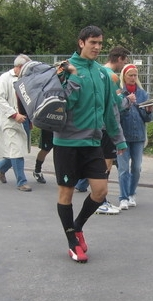
Polenz pictured during his time at Werder Bremen in June 2007.

Polenz was born in Berlin, Germany, to an Algerian father and a German mother. He first began his youth career with SC Siemensstadt at the age of seven before advancing through the youth systems of CFC Hertha 06 and TeBe Berlin. Growing up, Polenz attended the Gymnasium Obervieland and graduated with an Abitur diploma.

When he was fifteen years old, Polenz joined Werder Bremen and quickly developed his way through the club's teams. After three years on Bremen's reserve team, he made his first team debut on 4 February 2006, beating Mainz 4–2. Following his debut, Polenz signed his first professional contract with the club, keeping him until 2009. He later went on to make three appearances at the end of the 2005–06 season. Polenz made no appearances in the first team throughout the 2006–07 season.

=== Alemannia Aachen ===
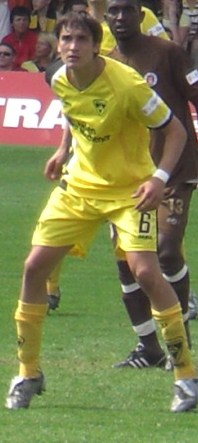
Polenz playing for Alemannia Aachen in 2008.

It was announced on 15 June 2007 that Polenz joined Alemannia Aachen on a three–year contract, effectively joining the club on 1 July 2007.

He made his debut for the club, coming on as an 83rd-minute substitute, in a 3–0 win against FC Normannia Gmünd in the first round of the DFB–Pokal. In a follow–up match, Polenz made his first start for Alemannia Aachen, playing in the defensive midfield position, as the club drew 2–2 against Carl Zeiss Jena. Since joining Alemannia Aachen, he was involved in the first team, rotating in playing as a striker, right–midfield and right–back positions. Polenz also began to contribute assists, assisting four times However, along the way, he was plagued with injuries on five occasions. At the end of the 2007–08 season, Polenz went on to make twenty–seven appearances in all competitions.

At the start of the 2008–09 season, Polenz continued to regain his first team place and began playing in the right–back position. However, he suffered a torn ankle ligament injury while training and was sidelined for "a long time". Polenz did not return to the first team until on 14 December 2008 against FC Augsburg, coming on as an 82nd-minute substitute, as Alemannia Aachen lost 3–1. However, in a match against Hansa Rostock on 6 February 2009, he was sent–off for a straight red card in the 45th minute, as the club drew 3–3. After the match, it was announced that Polenz would have to serve a two match suspension. After serving a two match suspension, he returned to the first team against MSV Duisburg on 2 March 2009, coming on as a 60th-minute substitute, in a 2–1 loss. In a follow–up against SC Freiburg, Polenz set up Alemannia Aachen's only goal of the game, in a 2–1 loss. Despite being sidelined on two occasions later in the 2008–09 season, he later regained his first team place, playing in the right–back position for the rest of the season. At the end of the 2008–09 season, Polenz went on to make twenty–four appearances in all competitions.

At the start of the 2009–10 season, however, Polenz suffered a posterior cruciate ligament injury in his right knee in a 4–2 loss against Hearts in a friendly match. After the match, Alemannia Aachen announced on their website that he would be sidelined for about ten weeks. By October, Polenz recovered from his injury and was featured in two matches for the club's reserve team. He did not make his return to the first team until 1 November 2009 against FC Augsburg, coming on as a 77th-minute substitute, in a 1–0 win. However, Polenz continued to remain out of the sidelined, including another injury that saw out for a month. As a result, he was restricted to two starts for Alemannia Aachen.

=== Union Berlin ===
On 11 May 2010, Polenz signed for Union Berlin for the 2010–11 season, signing a three–year contract.

He made his debut for the club against Halle in the first round of the DFB–Pokal, and started the whole game, as Union Berlin lost 1–0. After joining the club, Polenz found himself competing with Marc Pfertzel and Paweł Thomik. As a result, he found his first team opportunities, resulting in him being placed on the substitute bench, as well as, his own injury concern. In December 2010, Polenz, along with Kenan Şahin, was barred from the first team squad and instead, the duo trained in the reserve squad. Following this, he never played in the first team for the rest of the 2010–11 season and made seven appearances in all competitions.

Ahead of the 2011–12 season, it was expected that Polenz would be leaving 1. FC Union Berlin, but ended up staying at the club. After nine months without playing in the first team, he was called back into the first team on 26 September 2011. Having appeared four times as an unused substitute, Polenz made his first appearance, coming on as a substitute in a 2–1 win over Eintracht Braunschweig on 4 November 2011. However, he found his first team place hard to come by and made two starts towards the 2011–12 season. At the end of the 2011–12 season, Polenz went on to make eight appearances in all competitions. Following this, he was released by the club.

=== Western Sydney Wanderers ===
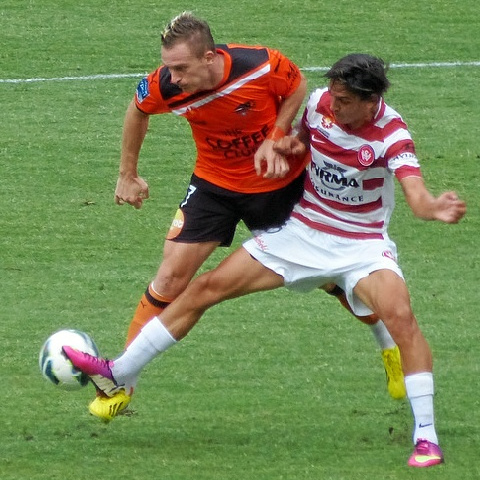
Polenz playing against Besart Berisha in 2013 during his time at Western Sydney Wanderers.

On 21 August 2012, Polenz signed a contract to be an inaugural squad member of Western Sydney Wanderers of Australia. He explained joining the club after watching his friend Thomas Broich's documentary called Tom Meets Zizou.

Western Sydney Wanderers made their debut in a 0–0 draw against Central Coast Mariners, where Polenz played in the right-back position on 6 October 2012. After joining the club, he quickly established himself in this position in the starting eleven, playing in the right–back position. His performance saw him signed a contract extension for the 2013–14 season. Polenz then contributed an assist for Mark Bridge to score an equaliser as Western Sydney Wanderers beat Brisbane Roar 2–1 on 20 January 2013. In a follow–up match against Melbourne Heart, he was sent–off in the 13th minute for an unprofessional foul, as the club won 1–0. After serving a one match suspension, Polenz returned to the starting line–up against Newcastle Jets on 9 February 2013 and set up Western Sydney Wanderers' second goal of the game, in a 2–1 win. He later helped the club finish first place in the league and qualify for the Final Series. After suffering an injury during a 3–1 win against Melbourne Heart on 16 March 2013, Polenz did not make his return to the first team until a match against Brisbane Roar in the semi–finals of the Final Series, starting a match before being substituted in the 41st minute once, as Western Sydney Wanderers won 2–0. In the Grand Final against Central Coast Mariners, he returned to the starting line–up and played 76 minutes before being substituted, as the club lost 2–0. At the end of the 2012–13 season, Polenz went on to make twenty-five appearances in all competitions. For his performance, he was named A-League Team of the Season.

Polenz scored his first ever senior goal in the Western Sydney Wanderers one all draw with Wellington Phoenix in round 2 of the 2013–14 season. Two weeks later on 1 November 2013, he set up a winning goal for Tomi Juric, who scored twice, in a 2–1 win against Adelaide United. By the end of the year, Polenz helped the club keeping five clean sheets. After the start of the 2013–14 season, Polenz continued to regain his first team place, playing in the right–back position. He then made his AFC Champions League debut, playing the whole game, in a 3–1 loss against Ulsan Hyundai on 26 February 2014. A month later on 23 March 2014, Polenz scored his second goal for Western Sydney Wanderers, in a 3–0 win against Perth Glory. He helped the club reach the Grand Final, only to lose 2–1 against Brisbane Roar on 4 May 2014. Despite being sidelined on three occasions later in the 2013–14 season, Polenz went on to make twenty-five appearances and scoring two times in all competitions. Following this, he was released by the club, ending the speculation over his future at Western Sydney Wanderers.

=== Sarpsborg 08 ===
On the eve of the summer transfer window in 2014, Sarpsborg 08 signed Polenz for the remainder of the season.

He made his debut for the club against Molde on 17 August 2014, coming on as a 75th-minute substitute, in a 2–0 loss. Two months later against Stabæk on 26 October 2014, Polenz made his first start for Sarpsborg 08, as the club drew 1–1. However, his first team opportunities were limited to the substitute bench, as he made two appearances for Sarpsborg 08 in all competitions.

=== Brisbane Roar ===
At the opening of the A-League transfer window in 2015, Polenz was signed by Brisbane Roar as their last foreign player. He had been trialing with the club since the middle of December 2014 and signed a deal which binds him until the end of the 2016–17 season.

Polenz made his debut for the club, starting the whole game, against Wellington Phoenix on 2 February 2015 and assisted the winning goal for Jean Carlos Solórzano, in a 3–2 win. After joining Brisbane Roar, he quickly established himself in the first team, playing in the right–back position. This lasted until Polenz suffered an injury while warming up and was out for weeks. He made his return to the first team against Melbourne Victory on 18 April 2015, coming on as a second-half substitute, in a 1–0 loss. At the end of the 2014–15 season, Polenz went on to make eleven appearances in all competitions.

After playing only 75 minutes during the 2015–16 season, he was released a year early from his contract.

== Post-playing career ==
Following his departure from Brisbane Roar, Polenz retired from professional football that summer. Afterwards, he initially worked in online marketing, but later relocated to Barcelona. Polenz revealed that he had a short and unsuccessful excursion into the fashion business during his career in Berlin after his fashion label called "Propeller" failed and didn't mainstay for the time after, reflecting: "The idea was good, the implementation was not."

In March 2020, Eintracht Frankfurt appointed Polenz and his former teammate Thomas Broich as their U15 coach, effectively starting from 1 July 2020.

== International career ==
Polenz was eligible to play for Germany and Algeria but ended up playing for Germany.

In September 2004, Polenz was called up to the Germany U19 squad and made his debut for the U19 side, losing 4–1 against Spain U19 on 17 September 2004. He played a part in the 2005 UEFA European Under-19 Championship in the group stage against Serbia and Montenegro coming on as a substitute in the 78th minute replacing Markus Heppke. However, Polenz was unable to take part in the remaining fixtures of the group stage and the semi-final against France due to an injury and returned to Germany prior to the match alongside Sascha Dum and Markus Steinhöfer who were also injured. He went on to make three appearances for Germany U19.

In September 2005, Polenz was called up to the Germany U20 squad and made his U20 debut, losing 2–1 against Switzerland on 14 September 2005. A year later on 6 December 2006, he made his second appearance for Germany U19, in a 1–0 against Italy U20. Polenz went on to make two appearances for Germany U20.

== Personal life ==
Polenz revealed that he began playing football at a young age. Polenz has two brothers and a sister. One of his brothers played amateur football. In addition to speaking German, he speaks French. Polenz is married to his wife Svenja.

== Career statistics ==
Appearances and goals by club, season and competition
Club	Season	League			Cup		Continental		Other		Total	
Club	Season	Division	Apps	Goals	Apps	Goals	Apps	Goals	Apps	Goals	Apps	Goals
Werder Bremen II	2004–05	Regionalliga Nord	4	2	—		—		—		26	8
Werder Bremen II	2005–06	Regionalliga Nord	29	9	—		—		—		13	2
Werder Bremen II	2006–07	Regionalliga Nord	31	4	—		—		—		23	0
Werder Bremen II	Total		64	15	0	0	0	0	0	0	64	15
Werder Bremen	2005–06	Bundesliga	3	0	0	0	0	0	—		3	0
Werder Bremen	2006–07	Bundesliga	0	0	0	0	0	0	—		0	0
Werder Bremen	Total		3	0	0	0	0	0	0	0	3	0
Alemannia Aachen	2007–08	2. Bundesliga	24	0	2	0	—		—		26	0
Alemannia Aachen	2008–09	2. Bundesliga	23	0	1	0	—		—		24	0
Alemannia Aachen	2009–10	2. Bundesliga	4	0	0	0	—		—		4	0
Alemannia Aachen	Total		51	0	3	0	0	0	0	0	54	0
Union Berlin	2010–11	2. Bundesliga	6	0	1	0	—		—		7	0
Union Berlin	2011–12	2. Bundesliga	8	0	0	0	—		—		8	0
Union Berlin	Total		14	0	1	0	0	0	0	0	15	0
Western Sydney Wanderers	2012–13	A-League	25	0	—		—		—		25	1
Western Sydney Wanderers	2013–14	A-League	22	2	—		3	0	—		25	2
Western Sydney Wanderers	Total		47	2	0	0	3	0	0	0	50	2
Sarpsborg 08	2014	Tippeligaen	2	0	0	0	—		—		2	0
Brisbane Roar	2014–15	A-League	11	0	—		0	0	—		11	0
Brisbane Roar	2015–16	A-League	1	0	0	0	—		—		1	0
Brisbane Roar	Total		12	0	0	0	0	0	0	0	12	0
Career total			192	17	4	0	3	0	0	0	199	17

== Honors ==
Western Sydney Wanderers

- A-League Premiership: 2012–13
- A-League Championship Runners-up: 2012–13, 2013–14

Individual

- A-League PFA Team of the Season: 2012–13
