= Abrahim Yango =

Liberian footballer

Personal information
- Full name: Abrahim Yango
- Date of birth: 6 August 1996 (age 30)
- Place of birth: Liberia
- Position: Winger

Team information
- Current team: Eastern Suburbs

Youth career
- Holland Park Hawks
- 2014–2016: Brisbane Roar

Senior career*
Years	Team	Apps	(Gls)
2013	QAS	21	(4)
2014	Brisbane Roar NPL	16	(8)
2015–2016	Brisbane Roar	2	(0)
2016	Avondale FC	21	(1)
2017–	Eastern Suburbs	102	(30)
- * Club domestic league appearances and goals as of 23 September 2022 ‡ National team caps and goals as of 18 April 2015

Abrahim Yango (born 6 August 1996) is a Liberian footballer who plays as a winger for Eastern Suburbs in the National Premier Leagues Queensland.

== Club career ==
Yango started his career with A-League side Brisbane Roar. He made his senior debut on 18 April 2015 against Melbourne Victory FC.

Yango signed with Avondale FC in February 2016 ahead of the NPL Victoria season.
