= Steven Gray (footballer) =

Irish footballer

Personal information
- Date of birth: 17 October 1981 (age 45)
- Place of birth: Leixlip, Ireland
- Position: Centre back

Youth career
- Leixlip United
- Cherry Orchard
- Verona
- Southampton

Senior career*
Years	Team	Apps	(Gls)
2002–2007	Drogheda United	123	(0)
2008–2009	Derry City	49	(0)
2010	Bohemians	4	(0)
2011	Dandenong Thunder	22	(0)
2012	Oakleigh Cannons	5	(0)
2012–2013	Melbourne Heart	1	(0)
2013	Oakleigh Cannons	9	(0)
Total		223	(0)
- * Club domestic league appearances and goals

Steven Gray (born 17 October 1981) is an Irish retired footballer who played for Drogheda United, Derry City & Bohemians in the League of Ireland as well as Dandenong Thunder, Oakleigh Cannons (2 spells) & Melbourne Heart in Australia. Gray played as a centre back.

== Club career ==
Gray played as a youth with hometown club Leixlip United, Cherry Orchard and Verona before moving to Southampton. He returned home and was captured by Drogheda United where he made his League of Ireland debut on 22 November 2002. He was voted Drogheda United Player of the Year in 2004. During his time at United Park, Gray won a League Championship medal, an FAI Cup winners medal and two Setanta Cups. Gray made three appearances in the UEFA Cup for the Boynesiders.

He signed for Derry City on 26 November 2007, following the departure of Ken Oman from the club. Gray recorded his first goal for Derry City on 3 February 2009 with a game-winning goal in a 2–1 victory against Danish-side Esbjerg fB in a preseason friendly. Two weeks later, he scored his second goal with the club in a preseason friendly with Longford Town.

After his time at Derry finished, he signed for Bohemians in January 2010. In February 2010, he scored the winner against Bluebell United in the Leinster Senior Cup in his first competitive game for the Gypsies. However an achilles injury ruined Gray's campaign and he made only 4 league appearances during the 2010 season. At the end of 2010, financial difficulties beset Bohemians and Steven became involved in a court action over unpaid wages.

In June 2012, Gray went on trial with A-League club Melbourne Heart. On 2 July 2012, he signed a two-year contract with Melbourne Heart. On 6 February 2013 he was released to make way for Jamie Coyne.

After eight years in Australia Gray returned home and joined the Shamrock Rovers Academy where he ran the Transition Year programme.

In August 2025, he was announced as the chief executive officer of Athlone Town.

== Honours ==
Drogheda United

- League of Ireland Premier Division: 2007
- FAI Cup: 2005
- Setanta Sports Cup: 2006, 2007

Bohemians

- Setanta Sports Cup: 2010

== Sources ==
- League of Ireland Media Guide 2010
