= Patrick Nyema Gerhardt =

Liberian footballer (born 1985)

Patrick Gerhardt
Personal information
- Full name: Patrick Nyema Gerhardt
- Date of birth: 31 July 1985 (age 41)
- Place of birth: Bern, Switzerland
- Height: 6 ft 1/2 in (1.84 m)
- Position: Defender

Youth career
- 2000–2004: Young Boys

Senior career*
| Years | Team | Apps | (Gls) |
| 2004–2008 | Young Boys | 1 | (0) |
| 2004–2005 | → Young Boys II (loan) | 22 | (11) |
| 2006–2007 | → Concordia Basel (loan) | 11 | (0) |
| 2007–2008 | → SR Delémont (loan) | 30 | (3) |
| 2008–2009 | CS Otopeni | 4 | (1) |
| 2010–2011 | Brantford Galaxy | 12 | (0) |
| 2011–2012 | Željezničar Sarajevo | 33 | (2) |
| 2012–2014 | Melbourne Heart | 40 | (1) |
| 2015 | Sarawak FA | 2 | (1) |
| 2017 | Melbourne Knights | 3 | (0) |
| 2017 | Nunawading City | 11 | (3) |

International career^{‡}
| 2011–2015 | Liberia | 8 | (0) |
- * Club domestic league appearances and goals as of 4 October 2017 ‡ National team caps and goals as of 22 March 2016

Patrick Nyema Gerhardt (born 31 July 1985) is a former professional footballer who last played for National Premier Leagues Victoria 2 side Nunawading City. Born in Switzerland, he represented the Liberia national football team. He is known for his strength, technical skill, heading ability and industrious work rate.

== Early life ==
Gerhardt was born in Bern, Switzerland. He holds a Liberian citizenship through his heritage. He began his football career at Bern, local club FC Bumpliz, before impressing enough to be selected in the BSC Young Boys youth system, where he played for the under 15, under 17, under 18 and under 21 teams. He also won international youth caps for the Swiss national under 15 and under 16 side.

== Career ==
After four years in the youth system and at the age of 19 he won a senior contract with BSC, playing 22 times for the BSC Young Boys II team. After a series of loans to local sides Concordia Basel and SR Delémont he left BSC after just one senior appearance. Gerhardt left BSC in the middle of 2008 and joined newly promoted Romanian Liga I team CS Otopeni. He left after a frustrating season which saw Otopeni relegated and few first team chances. In 2010, he joined Canadian Soccer League side Brantford Galaxy. After an up and down 'regular season' Gerhardt helped the side win the league playoffs, where they came from way back in 7th place to beat Hamilton Croatia 0–3 in the final.

=== FK Željezničar ===
On 26 January 2011, FK Željezničar Sarajevo announced that Gerhardt was coming on trial with the club. He signed for FK Željezničar on 7 February, for the remainder of the 2010–11 season. After helping the Club win the National league cup he was awarded a 1-year contract, keeping him at the club until the end of the 2011/12 season.

The 2011–12 season was an even better one for the club and for Gerhardt, winning 'the Double' (League and Cup titles), as well as qualifying for the UEFA Champions League. It was the first double for any club since the unified Bosnia and Herzegovina football competitions started in 2002.

=== Melbourne Heart FC ===
On 22 June 2012, he signed for Australian A-League club Melbourne Heart. He was released by the club on 30 April 2014.

After a stint with Malaysian Sarawak FA, Gerhardt returned to Australia, signing for National Premier Leagues Victoria club Melbourne Knights FC. After battling various injuries in the first part of the season, Gerhardt made his Knights debut in Round 14, coming on as a late substitute in a 1–0 win over Hume City FC. He moved to Nunawading City in June 2017.

== International career ==
Despite being born in Bern, Switzerland, Gerhardt accepted the call to play for the Liberian national team. He was eligible to play for Liberia due to his heritage. He debuted on 26 March 2011 in a 2012 Africa Cup of Nations qualification match against Cape Verde Islands, a 2–4 loss.

== Honors ==
=== FK Željezničar ===
Winner

- Premier League of Bosnia and Herzegovina: 2011/2012
- Bosnia and Herzegovina Football Cup: 2010/2011, 2011/2012

=== Brantford Galaxy ===
Winner

- Canadian Soccer League (playoffs): 2010
