= Golgol Mebrahtu =

Professional soccer player

Personal information
- Full name: Golgol Tedros Mebrahtu
- Date of birth: 28 August 1990 (age 36)
- Place of birth: Khartoum, Sudan
- Height: 1.82 m (6 ft 0 in)
- Position: Forward

Youth career
- Brisbane Northern Districts
- Brisbane Olympic
- 2009–2010: Gold Coast United

Senior career*
Years	Team	Apps	(Gls)
2009	Brisbane Strikers	8	(0)
2009–2012	Gold Coast United	26	(0)
2012–2014	Melbourne Heart	26	(4)
2014–2016	Western Sydney Wanderers	9	(0)
2016–2018	Mladá Boleslav	35	(14)
2018–2019	Sparta Prague	7	(0)
2019–2020	Puskás Akadémia	17	(1)
2021	Brisbane Roar	12	(1)
2022	PSM Makassar	7	(0)
2022–2023	Avondale	1	(0)
2023	Bentleigh Greens	7	(0)
Total		151	(20)

International career
2011	Australia U23	1	(0)
- * Club domestic league appearances and goals

Golgol Mebrahtu (born 28 August 1990) is a former professional soccer player who played as a forward. Born as an Eritrean refugee in Sudan, he has represented Australia at youth level.

== Early life ==
Born in Sudan, Mebrahtu is of Eritrean descent. Mebrahtu moved to Brisbane, Queensland, Australia at age nine. Mebrahtu currently resides in Melbourne, Australia. He is a Coptic Orthodox Christian.

== Club career ==
=== Gold Coast United ===
In June 2009, Mebrahtu signed a 3-year contract with Gold Coast United, after a successful trial at the club in April.

He was discovered by Gold Coast coach Miron Bleiberg, while he was waiting for a helicopter to take him from Brisbane to the Gold Coast. Bleiberg spotted Mebrahtu training by himself and recognised him from a previous scouting mission.

=== Melbourne Heart ===
For the 2012–13 season Mebrahtu played for Melbourne Heart. He wore the number 14 football jersey. In his first game for Melbourne Heart, he scored the winning goal in the 88th minute against Perth Glory. On 1 January 2013, he scored the first goal of that year.

On 2 February 2014, he was released from Melbourne Heart, 3 days before the end of the transfer window.

=== Western Sydney Wanderers ===
On 3 February 2014, Mebrahtu signed with the Western Sydney Wanderers along with Daniel Mullen. However, since there were no spaces remaining in the club's A-League squad, he was only eligible to participate in the Western Sydney Wanderers' 2014 AFC Champions League campaign during the 2013–14 season. On 5 March 2014, following a long-term injury to Tahj Minniecon, Mebrahtu was added to Western Sydney Wanderers' A-League squad. Mebrahtu made his debut for the Wanderers against Sydney FC as a substitute in the 71st minute, but was replaced 6 minutes later when injured in a tackle by Sydney FC midfielder Richard Garcia.

On 5 May 2016, Mebrahtu was released by the Western Sydney Wanderers.

=== Mladá Boleslav ===
In mid-2016, Mebrahtu joined Czech First League club Mladá Boleslav in the Czech Republic. He scored 6 goals in 14 matches in the 2017–18 season, but fell out of the matchday squad after the arrival of new Mladá Boleslav head coach Jozef Weber and Mebrahtu's contract was mutually terminated in August 2018.

=== Sparta Prague ===
On 20 August 2018, it was announced he had signed a one-year contract with Sparta Prague and left the club at the end of the season.

=== Brisbane Roar ===
On 22 January 2021, it was announced that Mebrahtu had signed a deal with Brisbane Roar. He scored his first goal for the club on March 21, a late equaliser in a 1–1 draw against Wellington Phoenix.

=== PSM Makassar ===
On 11 January 2022, Indonesian top flight side PSM Makassar announced it had signed Mebrahtu.

== International career ==
Mebrahtu made his international debut for Australia's under-23 squad in 2011, coming on in the second half of in a loss to Japan U23.

Because of his birthplace and ancestry, Mebrahtu is eligible to represent multiple teams internationally: Australia, the country he is now a naturalised citizen of and gained the status of professional footballer in, Sudan, the country of his birth, and, Eritrea, the country of his ancestry.

Mebrahtu was approached by Daniel Solomon, an agent from the Eritrean National Football Federation, to play for Eritrea, the land of his ancestry, in August 2018.

He was called up to the Eritrean team for a World Cup qualifying playoff against Namibia in September 2019, but did not feature in the matchday squads.

== Honours ==
=== Club ===
Gold Coast United

- National Youth League: 2009–10

Western Sydney Wanderers

- AFC Champions League: 2014
