= List of A-League Men head coaches =

The A-League Men is a professional soccer league in Australia which is at the top of the Australian league system. The league was formed in 2005 as a replacement for the original National Soccer League.

Some of the people have served spells as caretaker (temporary) managers in the period between a managerial departure and appointment. Several caretaker managers such as Tony Walmsley at Central Coast Mariners have gone on to secure a permanent managerial post. As of 2023, Ernie Merrick, Mike Mulvey, John Aloisi, Marko Rudan and Tony Popovic are the only coaches to have managed more than two A-League Men clubs.

== Managers ==
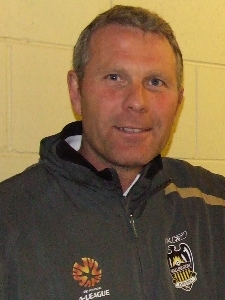
Ricki Herbert has been in charge of both New Zealand Knights and Wellington Phoenix in the A-League.

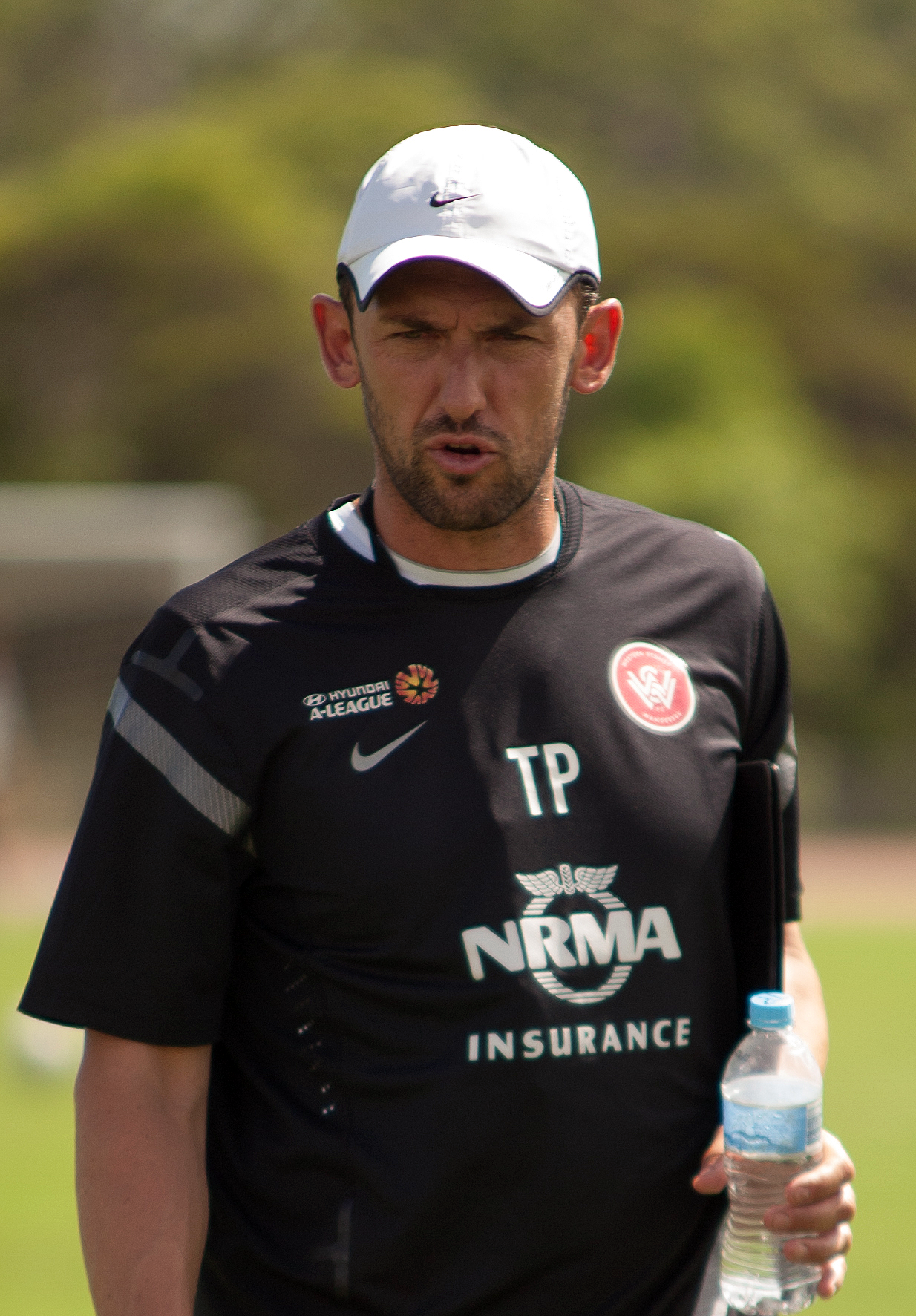
Tony Popovic was the first coach of Western Sydney Wanderers.

The list of managers includes everyone who has managed clubs while they were in the A-League Men, whether in a permanent or temporary role. Caretaker managers are listed only when they managed the team for at least one match in that period.

The dates of appointment and departure may fall outside the club's period in the A-League Men, for example, John Kosmina was appointed as Adelaide United manager in 2003 (before the A-League was formed in 2005) and remained in his position through the league's establishment.

Key
†	Incumbent manager
‡	Caretaker manager
*	Present up to date as of 31 January 2025

Managers
Name	Nat.	Club	From	Until	Duration (days)	Seasons in A-League Men	Ref.
John Kosmina	AUS	Adelaide United	13 September 2003	23 February 2007	1259	2	
Aurelio Vidmar	AUS	Adelaide United	23 February 2007	3 June 2010	1196	3	
Rini Coolen	NED	Adelaide United	6 July 2010	18 December 2011	530	2	
John Kosmina	AUS	Adelaide United	18 December 2011	28 January 2013	407	2	
Michael Valkanis ‡	AUS	Adelaide United	28 January 2013	10 April 2013	72	1	
Josep Gombau	ESP	Adelaide United	30 April 2013	24 July 2015	815	2	
Guillermo Amor	ESP	Adelaide United	24 July 2015	10 May 2017	652	2	
Marco Kurz	GER	Adelaide United	16 August 2017	30 June 2019	684	2	
Gertjan Verbeek	NED	Adelaide United	1 July 2019	29 April 2020	304	1	
Carl Veart ‡	AUS	Adelaide United	15 June 2020	15 June 2020	95	1	
Carl Veart †	AUS	Adelaide United	18 September 2020	Present*	2349	5	
Steve Corica †	AUS	Auckland FC	20 December 2023	Present*	1066	1	
Frank Farina	AUS	Brisbane Roar	15 November 2006	14 October 2009	1064	4	
Rado Vidošić ‡	CRO	Brisbane Roar	14 October 2009	17 October 2009	3	1	
Ange Postecoglou	AUS	Brisbane Roar	17 October 2009	24 April 2012	920	3	
Rado Vidošić	CRO	Brisbane Roar	25 April 2012	18 December 2012	237	1	
Mike Mulvey	ENG	Brisbane Roar	18 December 2012	23 November 2014	705	3	
Frans Thijssen ‡	NED	Brisbane Roar	23 November 2014	26 May 2015	184	1	
John Aloisi	AUS	Brisbane Roar	26 May 2015	28 December 2018	1313	4	
Darren Davies ‡	WAL	Brisbane Roar	29 December 2018	30 June 2019	184	1	
Robbie Fowler	ENG	Brisbane Roar	1 July 2019	29 June 2020	365	1	
Warren Moon Darren Davies ‡	AUS; WAL	Brisbane Roar	29 June 2020	16 July 2020	18	1	
Warren Moon	AUS	Brisbane Roar	16 July 2020	20 February 2023	950	4	
Nick Green ‡	ENG	Brisbane Roar	21 February 2023	2 May 2023	70	1	
Ross Aloisi	AUS	Brisbane Roar	2 May 2023	24 December 2023	237	1	
Luciano Trani ‡	AUS	Brisbane Roar	24 December 2023	1 January 2024	9	1	
Ben Cahn	ENG	Brisbane Roar	1 January 2024	1 February 2024	31	1	
Ruben Zadkovich ‡	AUS	Brisbane Roar	1 February 2024	22 April 2024	82	1	
Ruben Zadkovich	ENG	Brisbane Roar	22 April 2024	Present*	942	2	
Lawrie McKinna	SCO	Central Coast Mariners	10 October 2004	9 February 2010	1948	5	
Graham Arnold	AUS	Central Coast Mariners	9 February 2010	14 November 2013	1374	4	
Phil Moss	AUS	Central Coast Mariners	15 November 2013	5 March 2015	475	2	
Tony Walmsley	ENG	Central Coast Mariners	5 March 2015	8 August 2016	522	2	
Paul Okon	AUS	Central Coast Mariners	28 August 2016	20 March 2018	570	2	
Wayne O'Sullivan ‡	IRL	Central Coast Mariners	20 March 2018	18 April 2018	184	1	
Mike Mulvey	ENG	Central Coast Mariners	1 July 2018	10 March 2019	253	1	
Alen Stajcic ‡	AUS	Central Coast Mariners	12 March 2019	1 May 2019	51	1	
Alen Stajcic	AUS	Central Coast Mariners	1 May 2019	1 May 2021	732	2	
Nick Montgomery	SCO	Central Coast Mariners	2 July 2021	11 September 2023	802	2	
Mark Jackson †	ENG	Central Coast Mariners	27 September 2023	Present*	1150	2	
Miron Bleiberg	ISR	Gold Coast United	6 June 2008	19 February 2012	1353	3	
Mike Mulvey ‡	ENG	Gold Coast United	19 February 2012	5 April 2012	46	1	
Ante Milicic	AUS	Macarthur FC	15 May 2019	8 May 2022	1090	2	
Dwight Yorke	TRI	Macarthur FC	15 May 2022	21 January 2023	252	1	
Mile Sterjovski †	AUS	Macarthur FC	23 January 2022	Present*	1397	2	
John van 't Schip	NED	Melbourne Heart	12 October 2009	26 April 2012	927	2	
John Aloisi	AUS	Melbourne Heart	7 May 2012	29 December 2013	601	2	
John van 't Schip	NED	Melbourne City	29 December 2013	3 January 2017	1101	4	
Michael Valkanis ‡	AUS	Melbourne City	3 January 2017	27 January 2017	24	1	
Michael Valkanis	AUS	Melbourne City	27 January 2017	19 June 2017	144	1	
Warren Joyce	ENG	Melbourne City	19 June 2017	8 May 2019	659	2	
Erick Mombaerts	FRA	Melbourne City	26 June 2019	3 September 2020	436	1	
Patrick Kisnorbo	AUS	Melbourne City	3 September 2020	23 November 2022	812	3	
Rado Vidošić ‡	CRO	Melbourne City	23 November 2022	6 February 2023	76	1	
Rado Vidošić	CRO	Melbourne City	6 February 2023	1 November 2023	269	2	
Aurelio Vidmar †	AUS	Melbourne City	1 November 2023	Present*	1115	2	
Ernie Merrick	SCO	Melbourne Victory	20 December 2004	11 March 2011	2272	6	
Mehmet Durakovic	AUS	Melbourne Victory	11 March 2011	6 January 2012	301	2	
Kevin Muscat ‡	AUS	Melbourne Victory	6 January 2012	7 January 2012	1	1	
Jim Magilton ‡	NIR	Melbourne Victory	7 January 2012	1 April 2012	85	1	
Ange Postecoglou	AUS	Melbourne Victory	26 April 2012	25 October 2013	547	2	
Kevin Muscat	AUS	Melbourne Victory	31 October 2013	19 May 2019	2027	6	
Marco Kurz	GER	Melbourne Victory	27 June 2019	14 January 2020	202	1	
Carlos Pérez Salvachúa ‡	ESP	Melbourne Victory	14 January 2020	29 May 2020	137	1	
Grant Brebner ‡	SCO	Melbourne Victory	1 June 2020	24 August 2020	85	1	
Grant Brebner	SCO	Melbourne Victory	24 August 2020	17 April 2021	237	1	
Steve Kean ‡	SCO	Melbourne Victory	19 April 2021	30 June 2021	73	1	
Tony Popovic	AUS	Melbourne Victory	1 July 2021	12 June 2024	1078	3	
Patrick Kisnorbo	AUS	Melbourne Victory	25 June 2024	17 December 2024	176	1	
Arthur Diles ‡	AUS	Melbourne Victory	17 December 2024	31 January 2025	46	1	
Arthur Diles †	AUS	Melbourne City	31 January 2025	Present*	658	1	
John Adshead	NZL	New Zealand Knights	14 January 2005	10 April 2006	451	1	
Paul Nevin	ENG	New Zealand Knights	10 April 2006	15 November 2006	219	1	
Barry Simmonds ‡	ENG	New Zealand Knights	15 November 2006	14 December 2006	29	1	
Ricki Herbert	NZL	New Zealand Knights	14 December 2006	1 April 2007	108	1	
Richard Money	ENG	Newcastle Jets	25 May 2005	3 April 2006	313	1	
Nick Theodorakopoulos	AUS	Newcastle Jets	5 April 2006	10 October 2006	188	1	
Gary van Egmond	AUS	Newcastle Jets	10 October 2006	28 June 2009	992	3	
Branko Culina	AUS	Newcastle Jets	30 June 2009	4 October 2011	826	2	
Craig Deans ‡	AUS	Newcastle Jets	4 October 2011	20 October 2011	16	1	
Gary van Egmond	AUS	Newcastle Jets	20 October 2011	19 January 2014	822	3	
Clayton Zane ‡	AUS	Newcastle Jets	19 January 2014	5 May 2014	106	1	
Phil Stubbins	ENG	Newcastle Jets	5 May 2014	26 May 2015	386	1	
Scott Miller	AUS	Newcastle Jets	18 June 2015	7 September 2016	447	1	
Mark Jones	AUS	Newcastle Jets	23 September 2016	16 April 2017	205	1	
Ernie Merrick	SCO	Newcastle Jets	9 May 2017	6 January 2020	973	3	
Craig Deans Qiang Li ‡	AUS; CHN	Newcastle Jets	9 January 2020	6 February 2020	29	1	
Carl Robinson	WAL	Newcastle Jets	6 February 2020	14 October 2020	252	1	
Craig Deans ‡	AUS	Newcastle Jets	14 October 2020	9 February 2021	119	1	
Craig Deans	AUS	Newcastle Jets	9 February 2021	3 June 2021	115	1	
Arthur Papas	AUS	Newcastle Jets	28 June 2021	19 June 2023	722	2	
Robert Stanton †	AUS	Newcastle Jets	26 June 2023	Present*	1243	2	
Ian Ferguson	SCO	North Queensland Fury	15 September 2008	6 April 2010	568	1	
František Straka	CZE	North Queensland Fury	8 June 2010	1 March 2011	266	1	
Steve McMahon	ENG	Perth Glory	25 January 2005	7 December 2005	316	1	
Alan Vest ‡	NZL	Perth Glory	8 December 2005	26 July 2006	230	1	
Ron Smith	AUS	Perth Glory	26 July 2006	3 November 2007	465	2	
Dave Mitchell	AUS	Perth Glory	3 November 2007	11 October 2010	1073	4	
Ian Ferguson	SCO	Perth Glory	11 October 2010	11 February 2013	854	3	
Alistair Edwards	AUS	Perth Glory	11 February 2013	17 December 2013	309	2	
Kenny Lowe	ENG	Perth Glory	20 December 2013	20 April 2018	1583	5	
Tony Popovic	AUS	Perth Glory	11 May 2018	27 August 2020	840	2	
Hayden Foxe ‡	AUS	Perth Glory	2 September 2020	18 September 2020	16	1	
Richard Garcia	AUS	Perth Glory	18 September 2020	20 March 2022	549	2	
Ruben Zadkovich ‡	AUS	Perth Glory	20 March 2022	2 June 2022	75	1	
Ruben Zadkovich	AUS	Perth Glory	2 June 2022	2 June 2023	366	1	
Kenny Lowe ‡	ENG	Perth Glory	12 July 2023	3 August 2023	23	1	
Alen Stajcic	AUS	Perth Glory	3 August 2023	25 June 2024	328	1	
David Zdrilic †	AUS	Perth Glory	28 June 2024	Present*	875	1	
Miron Bleiberg	ISR	Queensland Roar	5 February 2005	14 November 2006	647	2	
Pierre Littbarski	GER	Sydney FC	26 February 2005	3 May 2006	431	1	
Terry Butcher	ENG	Sydney FC	17 May 2006	8 February 2007	267	1	
Branko Culina	AUS	Sydney FC	13 February 2007	22 October 2007	251	1	
John Kosmina	AUS	Sydney FC	24 October 2007	31 January 2009	465	2	
Vítězslav Lavička	CZE	Sydney FC	3 February 2009	30 March 2012	1151	3	
Ian Crook	AUS	Sydney FC	14 May 2012	11 November 2012	181	1	
Steve Corica ‡	AUS	Sydney FC	11 November 2012	28 November 2012	17	1	
Frank Farina	AUS	Sydney FC	28 November 2012	23 April 2014	511	2	
Graham Arnold	AUS	Sydney FC	8 May 2014	31 May 2018	1485	4	
Steve Corica	AUS	Sydney FC	1 June 2018	7 November 2023	1986	6	
Ufuk Talay †	AUS	Sydney FC	8 November 2023	Present*	1108	1	
Ricki Herbert	NZL	Wellington Phoenix	19 March 2007	26 February 2013	2171	6	
Chris Greenacre ‡	ENG	Wellington Phoenix	26 February 2013	20 May 2013	83	1	
Ernie Merrick	SCO	Wellington Phoenix	20 May 2013	5 December 2016	1296	4	
Des Buckingham Chris Greenacre ‡	ENG ENG	Wellington Phoenix	5 December 2016	1 January 2017	28	1	
Des Buckingham	ENG	Wellington Phoenix	1 January 2017	7 June 2017	158	1	
Darije Kalezić	BIH	Wellington Phoenix	7 June 2017	7 March 2018	274	1	
Marko Rudan	AUS	Wellington Phoenix	30 May 2018	3 May 2019	339	1	
Ufuk Talay	AUS	Wellington Phoenix	20 May 2019	6 May 2023	1448	4	
Giancarlo Italiano †	AUS	Wellington Phoenix	6 May 2023	Present*	1294	1	
Tony Popovic	AUS	Western Sydney Wanderers	18 May 2012	1 October 2017	1963	5	
Hayden Foxe ‡	AUS	Western Sydney Wanderers	3 October 2017	1 November 2017	30	1	
Josep Gombau	ESP	Western Sydney Wanderers	1 November 2017	19 April 2018	170	1	
Markus Babbel	GER	Western Sydney Wanderers	19 May 2018	20 January 2020	612	2	
Jean-Paul De Marigny ‡	AUS	Western Sydney Wanderers	20 January 2020	14 July 2020	177	1	
Jean-Paul De Marigny	AUS	Western Sydney Wanderers	14 July 2020	12 October 2020	91	1	
Carl Robinson	WAL	Western Sydney Wanderers	15 October 2020	30 January 2022	473	2	
Marko Rudan	AUS	Western Sydney Wanderers	31 January 2022	16 May 2024	837	3	
Alen Stajcic †	AUS	Western Sydney Wanderers	25 June 2024	Present*	878	1	
Marko Rudan	AUS	Western United	23 May 2019	23 May 2021	748	2	
John Aloisi †	AUS	Western United	15 July 2021	Present*	1954	2	

=== By club ===
Club	Total
Adelaide United	10
Auckland FC	1
Brisbane Roar	15
Central Coast Mariners	11
Gold Coast United	2
Macarthur FC	3
Melbourne City	8
Melbourne Victory	12
Newcastle Jets	15
New Zealand Knights	4
North Queensland Fury	2
Perth Glory	13
Sydney FC	10
Wellington Phoenix	8
Western Sydney Wanderers	8
Western United	2

== Most games coached in A-League Men ==
List of head coaches who have taken charge of over 100 A-League Men matches—As of 4 July 2026
Rank	Head coach	Games	Club(s)
1	(Scotland) Ernie Merrick	308	Melbourne Victory (151), Wellington Phoenix (90), Newcastle Jets (67)
2	(Australia) Tony Popovic	284	Western Sydney Wanderers (142), Perth Glory (57), Melbourne Victory (85)
3	(Australia) John Aloisi	245	Melbourne Heart (39), Brisbane Roar (95), Western United (111)
4	(Australia) Graham Arnold	211	Central Coast Mariners (98), Sydney FC (113)
5	(Australia) Steve Corica	199	Sydney FC (146), Auckland FC (53)
6	(Australia) Ufuk Talay	147	Wellington Phoenix (105), Sydney FC (42)
7	(Australia) Kevin Muscat	172	Melbourne Victory (172)
8	(New Zealand) Ricki Herbert	159	New Zealand Knights (5), Wellington Phoenix (154)
9	(Australia) Marko Rudan	153	Wellington Phoenix (28), Western United (54), Western Sydney Wanderers (71)
10	(Australia) Aurelio Vidmar	152	Adelaide United (73), Melbourne City (79)
11	(Netherlands) John van 't Schip	144	Melbourne City (144)
12	(Australia) Carl Veart	143	Adelaide United (143)
13	(Australia) Gary van Egmond	130	Newcastle Jets (130)
13	(England) Kenny Lowe	128	Perth Glory (128)
14	(Australia) Alen Stajcic	124	Central Coast Mariners (59), Perth Glory (26), Western Sydney Wanderers (39)
15	(Scotland) Lawrie McKinna	120	Central Coast Mariners (120)
16	(Australia) John Kosmina	118	Adelaide United (83), Sydney FC (35)
17	(Israel) Miron Bleiberg	114	Queensland Roar (33), Gold Coast United (81)
18	(Australia) Frank Farina	113	Brisbane Roar (66), Sydney FC (47)
19	(Australia) Ange Postecoglou	112	Brisbane Roar (80), Melbourne Victory (32)
20	(Australia) Warren Moon	101	Brisbane Roar (75), Central Coast Mariners (26)
