= List of Brisbane Roar FC head coaches =

Brisbane Roar FC is an association football club based in Brisbane, Australia. This page consists of information and statistics about all previous and current Managers of the Roar Men’s First Team.

== Managerial history ==
=== Bleiberg ===
Miron Bleiberg was appointed as the then Queensland Roar's inaugural manager on 2 March 2005. Under pressure from the fans to deliver on his promises of attractive, attacking and successful football he resigned on 12 November 2006 following a poor start to the 2006–07 season. After much speculation, Bleiberg was replaced by former Australian national team coach, Frank Farina just three days after Bleiberg's resignation.

=== Farina ===
Frank Farina's arrival led to a mini-revival which saw the club narrowly miss out on what would have been the Roar's first finals appearance, on goal difference. The 2007–08 season, however, saw Farina make up for the shortfall of the previous season, qualifying for the finals for the first time in the club's history. A memorable performance in the second leg of the semi-final saw the Roar defeat arch rivals 2–0 (2–0 agg.) Sydney FC in front of a (then) club record 36,221 fans to qualify for the preliminary final against the Newcastle Jets. The Roar would controversially lose 3–2 to the Newcastle side, who would ultimately go on to win the Grand Final. Farina again qualified for the finals in 2008–09, where the Roar dispatched of Central Coast Mariners 4–2 on aggregate, however they ultimately lost, again in the preliminary final, to Adelaide United after failing to capitalise on their dominance. On 10 October 2009, Farina was arrested by Queensland Police for Driving under the influence. He was initially suspended by the Roar and asked to show cause as to why he should not be sacked for tarnishing the name of the club. It was announced that assistant manager, Rado Vidošić fwould step into a caretakers role until a decision had been made which would include the M1 Derby, which the Roar lost 1–0 at home. Farina was ultimately sacked on 14 October 2009 and was replaced by former Australian Under-20 national team coach, Ange Postecoglou.

=== Postecoglou ===
Ange Postecoglou arrived mid-season armed with the task of picking up the pieces of a season in tatters. The 2009–10 season ended as the worst in the club's short history, finishing second from the bottom. Postecoglou completed a turn-around in the 2010–11 season. He made wholesale changes to the squad, commencing with the replacement of the "old-guard" of Charlie Miller, Craig Moore and Danny Tiatto and brought in his own squad which was a mixture of youth and talented experience. Under his brand of possession/attacking football, he would lead the team to win the club's inaugural Championship and go on to complete the club's first Double by also wrapping up the Premiership in a memorable 2011 A-League Grand Final in front of a then club record 50,168 supporters. The club went on an Australian sporting record 36-match unbeaten run which commenced in the 2010–11 season and ran through to the 2011–12 season. After much speculation on his future at the club, it was reported that Postecoglou had signed a three-year contract extension.

With such a successful season behind him, there was much talk as to whether the Roar could equal or better that in the 2011–12 season. Their title credentials were in doubt when the club went on a club-record worst losing streak of five matches immediately following the ending of their record 36-match unbeaten streak. Postecoglou remained steadfast in the club's footballing philosophy and the club went on to record just one loss in the last 14 games of the regular season to finish league runners-up. Unable to retain the Premiers Plate, Postecoglou led the club to back-to-back Premierships in a 2012 A-League Grand Final in front of a club-record 50,344 supporters. Postecoglou also led the Roar's initial foray into the 2012 Asian Champions League as reward for their success in the previous season. Success was mixed, picking up two draws from four matches.

On 24 April 2012, Postecoglou left the club by way of mutual consent, citing a desire to seek "a new challenge". Ange leaves the club as the most successful manager in the club's history.

On 26 April 2012, it was reported that Postecoglou did not, in fact, sign a new contract at the conclusion of the 2010–11 season due to the uncertainty around the club's ownership at the time. That allowed his original two-year contract with the club to expire at the conclusion of the 2011–12 season and leave to join Melbourne Victory without the Victory needing to pay out his "contract" with the Roar.

=== Vidošić ===
On 25 April 2012, Rado Vidošić was promoted to the Managers' position after serving seven years as Assistant Manager under the three previous managers before him. On 18 December 2012, Vidošić was removed as coach, taking up the role of technical director for the club. Vidošić was only manager for thirteen (13) matches before transferring to the new role, similar to the one offered to Postecoglou before his exit earlier in 2012.

=== Mike Mulvey ===
On 18 December 2012, Mike Mulvey was appointed manager after Rado Vidošić was "removed" from his position.

The 2013–14 season began with the Roar winning eight of their first ten games. This form continued for the rest of the season as the club became dominant premiers. Players like Ivan Franjic, Luke Brattan and Dimitri Petratos shone while the return of former captain Matt McKay bolstered the midfield. Brisbane won the grand final 2–1 after extra time against Western Sydney Wanderers. Club talisman Besart Berisha and star utility Ivan Franjic left the club over the off-season for Melbourne Victory and Torpedo Moscow, respectively.

=== Frans Thijssen (interim) 2015 ===
After a run of poor results at the beginning of the 2014–15 season, Mulvey stepped down from the head-coach role. Frans Thijssen was appointed caretaker coach for the remainder of the season.

Thinssen's first game in charge was a 1–1 draw against Perth Glory and ended with a 1–2 defeat against Urawa Red Diamonds. In total Thijssen was in charge for 28 games, winning eleven, drawing five and losing twelve.

Captain Matt Smith left the club in December, joining Bangkok Glass, and was replaced by former captain and club favourite Matt McKay. The season ended with the club recovering to finish in sixth position and qualify for the finals series. Brisbane were knocked out by Adelaide United in the elimination final 2–1.

=== John Aloisi ===
On 26 May 2015, John Aloisi was named manager of Brisbane Roar. In both of his first two seasons at the club, the Roar achieved a top 3 finish in the league, and made it to the semi-finals.

In May 2017, Aloisi signed a new three-year contract to stay on as manager of Brisbane.

=== Darren Davies (interim) 2019 ===
Following Aloisi's departure, Darren Davies was appointed interim head coach for an unspecified period. His tenure began with a 2–1 defeat away to Sydney FC and a 2–2 draw away to Newcastle Jets.

On 23 April 2019, the club announced Robbie Fowler as the new head coach, with Davies to take charge for the one remaining A-League game, on ANZAC Day.

Davies' final game in charge ended with a 5–3 home defeat by Adelaide United, in front of almost 12,000 fans including the new head coach. Davies' coaching record was: played 18, won 3, drew 3 and lost 12, scoring 28 goals and conceding 54. The final season of the Aloisi/Davies era saw Roar finish ninth on the ladder, with a home attendance of 9,632, the fourth-best in the competition that season.

=== Fowler era (2019–2020) ===
It was also announced that Tony Grant was joining the coaching team, alongside Fowler. Shortly after Fowler's appointment, the club announced a mass exodus of playing staff, with fourteen players released in late April 2019, including marquee signing Eric Bautheac

In June 2019 Fowler announced his first signing in Roy O'Donovan from Newcastle United Jets.

Fowler's first competitive match came in a 2–0 away win at reigning A-League Champions Sydney FC on 7 August 2019 in the FFA Cup.

On 29 June 2020, Roar announced Fowler would not be returning to the club after departing during the COVID-19 crisis. He left with a 45% win record (10 wins from 22 A-League games).

=== Warren Moon era (2020–2023) ===
Following Fowler's departure, the club announced internal appointment Warren Moon as his permanent replacement. He was to manage the senior men's team on an open-ended contract. Moon also maintained his role as academy head coach. Moon was an "A-League Foundation Player", having played sixteen games in Roars first season in the competition. He guided the team to fourth place in his first full season in charge, before losing the elimination final at home to Adelaide United. He also presided over Brisbane's Australia Cup semi-final loss to Sydney United 58. In Moon's second full season at the club, the club fell to eleventh place in the table. He was sacked on 20 February 2023. In total, Moon coached 75 games, winning 22, drawing 22 and losing 31.

=== Nick Green era (2023 R18 to EOS) ===
Following the departure of Warren Moon, the club announced the surprise appointment of Nick Green as interim coach through to the end of the season. Green finished with a nine-game record of 4 wins, 4 losses and a draw.

=== Ross Aloisi era (2023) ===
On 2 May 2023, Ross Aloisi, brother of former coach John, was appointed as head coach.He made a successful competitive debut in a 3–2 win away to Newcastle Jets in the Australia Cup. Ross managed a total of nine A League games, winning 4 and losing 3. In preseason, Ross also coached Roar to their first Australia Cup final, losing 3–1 away to Sydney. Roar were forced to play in Sydney due to the unavailability of Suncorp Stadium.

Ross resigned unexpectedly on Christmas Eve 2023, with his assistant, Luciano Trani, taking charge. He managed one game as Roar, an 8–1 away defeat at Melbourne City. His replacement, Ben Cahn, managed the club for five games, before leaving the club for "personal reasons", resulting in Roar having four coaches in little over a month.

=== Ruben Zadkovich era (2024–2025) ===
Taking over from Ben Cahn on an Interim basis, Ruben Zadkovich led Roar to a ninth-placed finish, but only winning three games out of twelve. He was offered the head coach position on a full-time basis at the end of April 2024.

In his first pre-season and after an early Australia Cup exit at the hands of Perth Glory, Zadkovich took his side to India and participated in 2024 Bhausaheb Bandodkar Memorial Trophy. They began the tournament campaign on 24 August, with a 5–1 win over local side Dempo. In their next match, Roar suffered a 1–0 defeat to FC Goa. The club then sealed their spot in semi-finals, defeating Sporting Goa 2–0 in the final group fixture.

The 2024/25 A League season started poorly and Zadkovich’s side recorded the worst start to an A League season in the history of the club and the worst start of any A League team, failing to record a win in their first 12 games.

Roar also recorded an unwanted record losing eight consecutive home games in the A-League Men competition, breaking the mark of seven the now defunct New Zealand Knights team set in 2005

Having finished second last in the ladder, on May 6 the club announced Zadkovich had left the club with immediate effect.

Zadkovich coached a total of 39 games winning just 8 and departed at a time Roars home crowds were at an all time low.

=== Michael Valkanis era (2025 -) ===
On the 7th of May 2025 Brisbane Roar unveiled former Socceroo Michael Valkanis as Head Coach with his first game being the Australian Cup playoff vs Wellington Phoenix in Darwin on May 14 resulting in a disappointing performance and 1-0 defeat.

== Managerial Records ==
List of Brisbane Roar FC managers
Name	Nationality	From	To	M	W	D	L	GF	GA	Win %	Honours	Notes
Rado Vidošić	Croatia	1 January 2005	30 June 2005	0	0	0	0	0	0	—		
Miron Bleiberg	Israel	1 July 2005	13 November 2006	42	13	16	13	53	41	30.95		
Frank Farina	Australia	15 November 2006	13 October 2009	75	30	21	24	103	92	40.00		
Rado Vidošić	Croatia	14 October 2009	15 October 2009	0	0	0	0	0	0	—		
Ange Postecoglou	Australia	16 October 2009	24 April 2012	84	41	25	18	142	94	48.81	A-League premiers: 2010–11; A-League champions: 2011, 2012	
Rado Vidošić	Croatia	25 April 2012	17 December 2012	13	3	3	7	17	19	23.08		
Mike Mulvey	England	18 December 2012	23 November 2014	56	28	7	21	79	57	50.00	A-League premiers: 2013–14; A-League champions: 2014	
Frans Thijssen (caretaker)	Netherlands	24 November 2014	25 May 2015	27	11	5	11	42	43	40.74		
John Aloisi	Australia	26 May 2015	28 December 2018	102	39	24	39	157	170	38.24		
Darren Davies (caretaker)	Wales	29 December 2018	30 June 2019	18	3	3	12	28	54	16.67		
Robbie Fowler	England	1 September 2019	16 July 2020	24	11	5	8	29	21	45.83		
Warren Moon	Australia	16 July 2020	20 February 2023	83	28	22	33	102	89	33.73		
Nick Green (caretaker)	England	21 February 2023	1 May 2023	9	4	1	4	15	12	44.44		
Ross Aloisi	Australia	2 May 2023	23 December 2023	10	4	2	4	16	15	40.00	Australian Cup Finalists 2023	
Luciano Trani (caretaker)	Australia	24 December 2023	31 December 2023	1	0	0	1	1	8	0.00		
Ben Cahn	England	1 January 2024	2 February 2024	5	1	0	4	5	11	20.00		
Ruben Zadkovich	Australia	2 February 2024	6 May 2025	38	8	9	21	53	74	21.05		
Michael Valkanis	Australia	7 May 2025		25	6	8	11	26	34	24.00		

- Manager dates and statistics are sourced from WorldFootball.net
- Only first-team competitive matches are counted. Wins, losses and draws are results at the final whistle; the results of penalty shoot-outs are not counted.
- Statistics are complete up to and including the match played on 14 September 2021.

=== Key ===
- M = matches played; W = matches won; D = matches drawn; L = matches lost; GF = Goals for; GA = Goals against; Win % = percentage of total matches won.
