= Paul Nevin =

Football player and manager (born 1969)

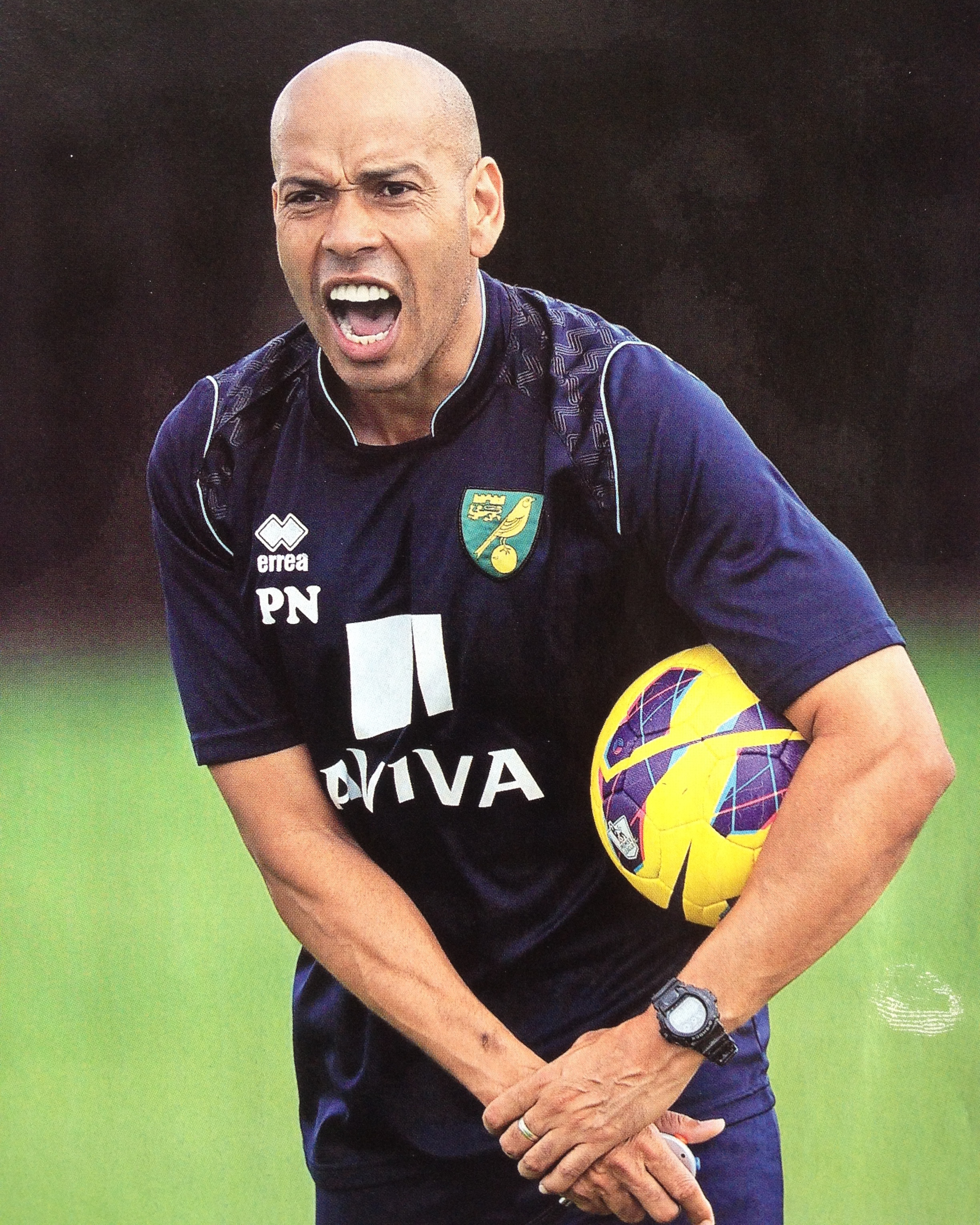
- Nevin with Norwich City in 2016

Personal information
- Full name: Paul Richard Nevin
- Date of birth: 23 June 1969 (age 57)
- Place of birth: Lewisham, England
- Position: Forward

Youth career
- Shrewsbury Town

College career
Years	Team	Apps	(Gls)
1987–1990	University of Evansville		

Senior career*
Years	Team	Apps	(Gls)
1990–1991	Shrewsbury Town	0	(0)
1991–1992	Carlisle United	8	(0)
1992–1994	Yeovil Town	35	(3)
Total		43	(3)

Managerial career
- 2006: New Zealand Knights
- 2007–2012: Aspire Academy
- 2020–2023: West Ham United (assistant)
- 2021–2024: England (assistant)
- 2023–2024: Strasbourg (assistant)
- 2024–2025: England U20 (interim)
- * Club domestic league appearances and goals

Paul Richard Nevin (born 23 June 1969) is a football coach and former player.

== Playing career ==
Nevin was born in Lewisham, London and began his playing career at Shrewsbury Town, before playing college soccer with Evansville Purple Aces whilst studying for a bachelor’s degree in communications at the University of Evansville in the United States. In 1991, Nevin returned to England, making eight Football League appearances for Carlisle United, as the club finished bottom of the Football League. Following his spell at Carlisle, Nevin joined Yeovil Town for two seasons, making 48 appearances in all competitions, before retiring from football at the age of 24, due to a back injury.

== Coaching career ==
Whilst at Yeovil, Nevin did volunteering at a children's home and took up a job as a social worker in Wandsworth. He continued with his football career working part-time for Fulham’s Centre of Excellence. He worked his way up at Craven Cottage becoming youth team coach, reserve team manager and by 2000 he was working under first-team manager Jean Tigana. In 2006 he accepted an invitation to improve the fortunes of the struggling New Zealand Knights, who competed in the Australian A-League. Nevin was appointed as manager following the departure of former coach John Adshead at the completion of the 2005–06 A-League season. Following his year in New Zealand, Nevin then took up a position at Aspire Academy in Qatar in 2007. He was responsible for developing players for Qatar's junior and senior national teams, while also being involved in coach development. After five years in the Middle East, Nevin returned to the Premier League as head of coaching at Norwich City and later became First team coach.

In 2014, Nevin was approached by the Premier League to become head of academy coach development, a role that saw Nevin work with all the Premier League and Category One clubs, and support each of them with their Coach Development programmes. Nevin has also worked with the FA as a coach with the youth national teams. In 2016 he was appointed as assistant manager to Chris Hughton at Brighton & Hove Albion. In October 2018, Nevin was temporarily appointed to Gareth Southgate's England national team coaching staff as part of the FA's BAME coaching initiative across all national teams. Nevin remained with the Three Lions through to their third-place finish at the 2019 UEFA Nations League Finals.

In February 2020, Nevin was appointed as first team coach at West Ham United. On 31 August 2021, it was confirmed that Nevin had returned to the England coaching staff alongside his West Ham duties. Nevin left West Ham in July 2023 to join Strasbourg.

On 23 August 2024, Nevin was placed in charge of England U20s on an interim basis. Nevin joined Stoke City on 1 January 2025 as assistant manager to Mark Robins alongside James Rowberry. Nevin left his role at Stoke in February 2026.

== Honours ==
England

- UEFA Nations League third place: 2019
