= Ben Cahn =

Australian soccer player and manager (born 1988)

Personal information
- Date of birth: 28 February 1988 (age 38)
- Place of birth: London, England

Team information
- Current team: Solomon Kings (head coach)

Youth career
- Years: Team
- Crystal Palace
- Fulham

Managerial career
- 2016–2017: Central Coast Mariners (assistant)
- 2017–2022: Olympic FC
- 2022–2023: Melbourne Knights
- 2024: Brisbane Roar
- 2025–: Solomon Kings
- 2026–: Solomon Islands (interim)

Ben Cahn (born 28 February 1988) is an Australian professional football manager who is currently the head coach of OFC Professional League club Solomon Kings and the Solomon Islands national football team.

== Career ==
=== Early life and move to Australia ===
Cahn was born in London, England, to an Australian mother. As a teenager he played in the academies for Crystal Palace, and Fulham. It was whilst at Fulham, his hopes of becoming a professional footballer were cut short when he was told by the club he would never make it professionally. When he was 21, Cahn travelled to Australia and started coaching in some football academies in the Sunshine Coast.

In 2015 he joined the Central Coast Mariners, becoming an integral part of their successful academy side, overseeing the development and rise of future A-League players Trent Buhagiar, Steve Whyte, Lachlan Wales and Adam Pearce. He was also briefly assistant to both Paul Okon and Tony Walmsley throughout their stints as manager. In 2017 he departed the Mariners and was signed as the head coach of Olympic FC in the NPL Queensland.

At the helm of Olympic FC, Cahn's team reached the grand final of the competition five times consecutively, however they lost all 5 grand finals.

In February 2023, Cahn took a further step in his managerial career, taking on the managerial role at Melbourne Knights. In his sole season in charge, Cahn led the Knights to a fourth-place finish in the 2023 NPL Victoria season, along with making the NPL Victoria, Dockerty Cup, and Australia Cup semi-finals, before leaving his position in order to become Brisbane Roar's Youth Technical Director.

=== Brisbane Roar ===
On 1 January 2024, Cahn was announced as the manager of Brisbane Roar, after interim manager Luciano Trani was sacked after one game following an 8–1 loss to Melbourne City. The appointment marks Cahn's first role as manager of a professional football club, along with his appointment being the fifth manager Brisbane Roar had signed in under a year since Warren Moon was sacked in February 2023.

After five games in charge with one win and four losses, Cahn went on long-term medical leave from 1 February 2024. He had been diagnosed with thyroid cancer and underwent throat surgery that left him unable to continue his work. Recently appointed assistant manager Ruben Zadkovich was elevated as his interim replacement. On 19 April 2024, Brisbane Roar announced Cahn had permanently departed the club.

=== Solomon Kings ===
On 13 December 2025, Cahn was appointed as the head coach of OFC Professional League club Solomon Kings.
