= Brisbane Roar FC =

Australian professional football club

Brisbane Roar
- Full name: Brisbane Roar Football Club
- Nicknames: Roar, Lions, The Orange
- Founded: 1957 (69 years ago) as Hollandia-Inala F.C.
- Ground: Suncorp Stadium / Kayo Stadium
- Capacity: 52,500/10,000
- Owner: Bakrie Group
- Chairman: Kaz Patafta
- Head coach: Michael Valkanis
- League: A-League Men
- 2025–26: 11th of 12
- Website: brisbaneroar.com.au
Home colours	Away colours	Third colours

Brisbane Roar Football Club is a professional association football club based in Brisbane, Queensland. The club competes in Australia's premier men's competition, A-League Men, which is the highest tier of Australia's football pyramid.

When Queensland Lions F.C. were the only Queensland bidder for the new A-League competition following the Crawford Report and the new FFA under Frank Lowy, Lions withdrew their men's team from the State Competition and entered it in to the A-League.

Initially competing under the name Queensland Roar before rebranding in 2009 to Brisbane Roar, the Roar has a rich history in the A-League, having won two Premierships and three Championships, while also holding the record for the longest unbeaten streak in the league's history, at 36 matches.

The team's core colour is orange, reflecting its Dutch heritage, and this has evolved over time. For the 2024–25 season, to mark the 20th anniversary of the A-League, Brisbane Roar announced a return to their original orange and blue colours. The club plays its home games at Lang Park in Milton, although they have used various other venues throughout their history, especially during the COVID-19 pandemic.

Brisbane Roar has won the domestic title on three occasions and holds the longest unbeaten record of 36 league matches without defeat. The club has a shared history with Queensland Lions FC, which competed in the inaugural A-League season as Queensland Roar.

== Background ==
Formed in 1957 as Hollandia-Inala by Dutch immigrants, the club became 'Brisbane Lions' and then transitioned into Queensland Roar, playing under that name from the inaugural 2005–06 season of the A-League until the 2008–09 season before finally becoming 'Brisbane Roar'.

Since joining the A-League, the club has won two league Premierships, three Championships and has competed in five AFC Champions League competitions.

The youth team competes in the A-League Youth and the women's team competes in the A-League Women. Commencing in 2014, the youth teams also compete in the NPL Queensland in order to provide sufficient matches to further develop their abilities. The youth team competes in the senior men's NPLQ division while the women's team compete in the NPLQ-W. The youth matches are typically played Roar's CoE while women's matches are played at various locations across Brisbane, including Heritage Park, Goodwin Park, QSAC, A.J. Kelly Park, Perry Park and occasionally Suncorp Stadium.

== History ==
=== Foundation as Hollandia-Inala F.C. (1957–1970s) ===
The origins of Brisbane Roar are traced back to the founding of Hollandia F.C. by Dutch immigrants in 1957. The club competed under this name for almost 20 years until, in the interest of inclusiveness and because perceptions that members of the public saw soccer as a migrants' game, all clubs were required to adopt non-ethnic names after a ruling by the Queensland Soccer Federation in 1973.

=== Brisbane Lions F.C. (1973–2009) ===
The club continued to be based in the Brisbane suburb of Richlands. After adopting the name Brisbane Lions in the 1970s, the club joined the National Soccer League (NSL) as one of the founding clubs in the 1977 season and competed until the end of the 1988 season before reverting down to the Brisbane Premier League thereafter.

In the 1990s, the club again changed its name to Queensland Lions after a legal dispute and subsequent agreement with the Australian rules football club, Brisbane Lions.

At the end of the 2004 season, Queensland Lions withdrew from the local Senior Men's competition to compete in the new National A-League as Queensland Roar. The Premier Youth team remained in the local soccer league.

For the next 3 seasons the senior Lions FC men's team was the Brisbane Roar but after three financially challenging years, Queensland Lions relinquished ownership of the Roar and reformed their men's team in the local senior men's competition.

==== Entering the A-League (2004) ====
Lions FC entered the A-League as Queensland Roar as a foundation member in 2004. The club continued to be based at Richlands, where club administration and player training continued.

At the time of conception of the A-League, teams from several capital cities were preferred to form the foundation clubs. By June 2004, two of the twenty submissions for joining the league were sought by partnerships formed in Brisbane, the capital of Queensland. On 1 November 2004, the group headed by Queensland Lions were chosen as operators of the Brisbane team. On 2 March the following year, Queensland Roar FC were officially announced.

The board consisted of chairman John Ribot, a former CEO of both National Rugby League clubs Brisbane Broncos and Melbourne Storm, deputy chairman Gary Wilkins, former Queensland and Australian international player, and CEO Lawrence Oudendyk, who was also Queensland Lions CEO.

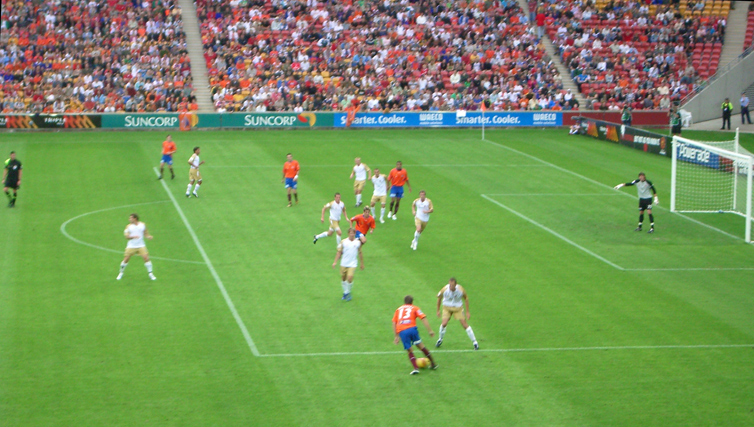
Roar playing at home in 2006.

Miron Bleiberg was appointed as the inaugural manager on 2 March 2005 but resigned during his second season with the club on 12 November 2006.

After much speculation, Bleiberg was replaced by former Australian national team coach, Frank Farina just three days after Bleiberg's resignation.

Frank Farina's arrival led to a mini-revival which saw the club narrowly miss out on what would have been the Roar's first finals appearance, on goal difference. The 2007–08 season, however, saw Farina make up for the shortfall of the previous season, qualifying for the finals for the first time in the club's history. A memorable performance in the second leg of the semi-final saw the Roar defeat arch rivals 2–0 (2–0 agg.) Sydney FC in front of a (then) club record 36,221 fans to qualify for the preliminary final against the Newcastle Jets. The Roar would controversially lose 3–2 to the Newcastle side, who would ultimately go on to win the Grand Final. Farina again qualified for the finals in 2008–09, where the Roar dispatched of Central Coast Mariners 4–2 on aggregate; however they ultimately lost, again in the preliminary final, to Adelaide United after failing to capitalise on their dominance.

On 10 October 2009, Farina was arrested by Queensland Police for drink driving. He was initially suspended by the Roar and asked to show cause as to why he should not be sacked for tarnishing the name of the club. It was announced that assistant manager Rado Vidošić would step into a caretaker role until a decision had been made which would include the M1 Derby, which the Roar lost 1–0 at home. Farina was ultimately sacked on 14 October 2009, with the club tasked with finding a replacement for the remainder of the 2009–10 season.

=== Brisbane Roar (2009–) ===
In 2009, the club was officially renamed to Brisbane Roar Football Club due to two other Queensland-based clubs entering the A-League competition, namely Gold Coast United and North Queensland Fury.

This was the club's fifth change of name after Hollandia-Inala, Brisbane Lions, Queensland Lions and Queensland Roar.

=== Postecoglou era (2009–2012) ===
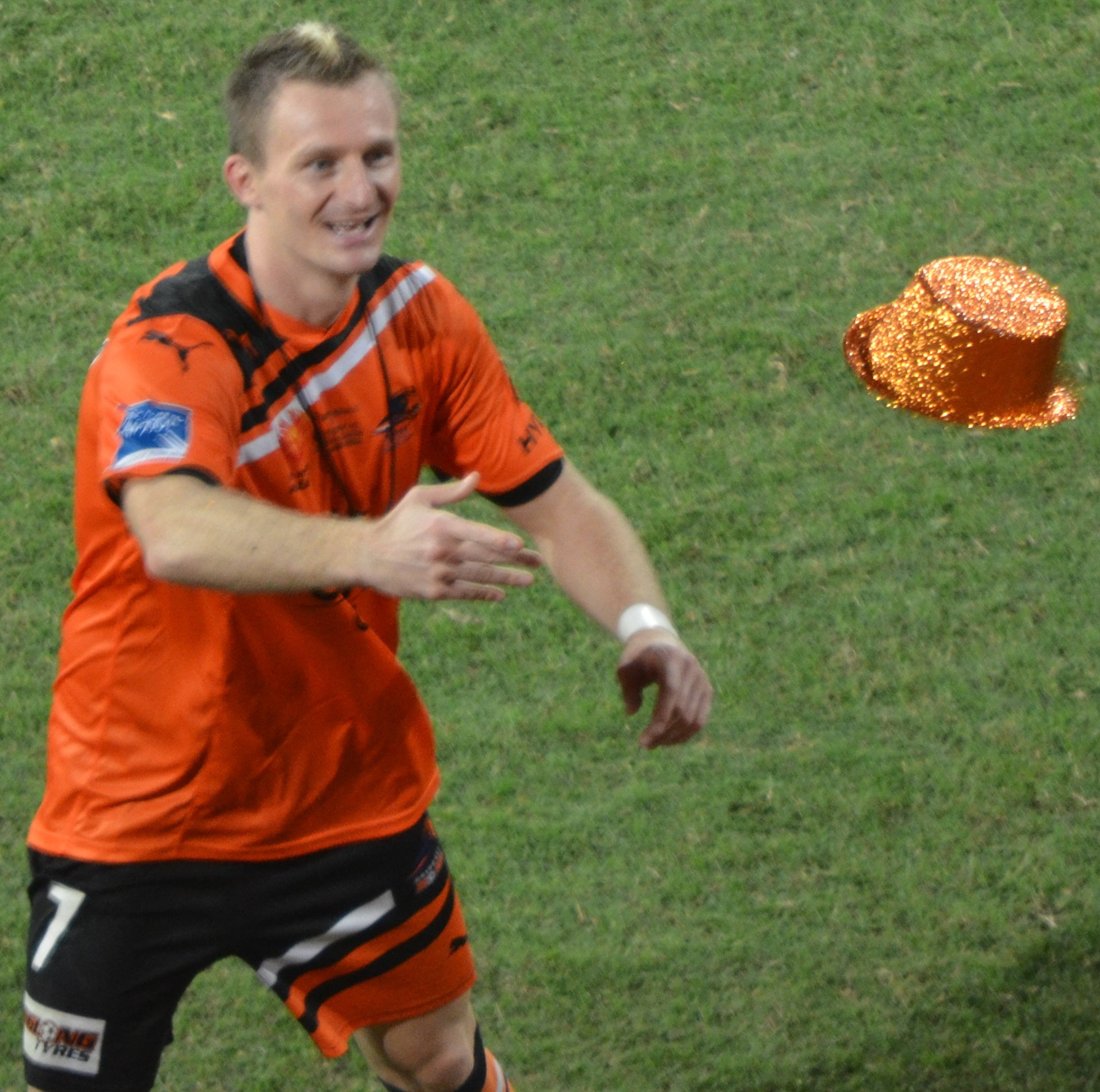
Besart Berisha, became the club's top-scorer.

Ange Postecoglou arrived mid-season armed with the task of picking up the pieces of a season in tatters. Postecoglou's first season ended as the worst in the club's short history, finishing second from the bottom. Postecoglou completed a turn-around in the 2010–11 season. He made wholesale changes to the squad, commencing with the replacement of the "old-guard" of Charlie Miller, Craig Moore and Danny Tiatto and brought in his own squad which was a mixture of youth and talented experience. Under his brand of possession/attacking soccer, he led the team to win the club's inaugural premiership and go on to complete the club's first Double by also wrapping up the championship in the 2011 A-League Grand Final in front of a then-club-record 50,168 supporters. The club went on an Australian sporting record 36-match unbeaten run, which commenced in the 2010–11 season and ran through to the 2011–12 season. After much speculation on his future at the club, it was reported that Postecoglou had signed a three-year contract extension.

With such a successful season behind him, there was much talk as to whether the Roar could equal or better that in the 2011–12 season. Their title credentials were in doubt when the club went on a club-record worst losing streak of five matches immediately following the ending of their record 36-match unbeaten streak. Postecoglou remained steadfast in the club's philosophy and the club went on to record just one loss in the last 14 games of the regular season to finish league runners-up. Unable to retain the Premiers Plate, Postecoglou led the club to back-to-back championships in the 2012 A-League Grand Final in front of a club-record 50,344 supporters. Postecoglou also led the Roar's initial foray into the 2012 Asian Champions League as reward for their success in the previous season. Success was mixed, picking up two draws from four matches.

On 24 April 2012, Postecoglou left the club by way of mutual consent, citing a desire to seek "a new challenge". He left the club as the most successful manager in the club's history. On 26 April 2012, it was reported that Postecoglou did not, in fact, sign a new contract at the conclusion of the 2010–11 season due to the uncertainty around the club's ownership at the time. That allowed his original two-year contract with the club to expire at the conclusion of the 2011–12 season and leave to join Melbourne Victory without the Victory needing to pay out his "contract" with the Roar.

=== Mulvey era (2012–2014) ===
On 25 April 2012, Rado Vidošić was promoted to the manager's position after serving seven years as Assistant Manager under the three previous managers before him. On 18 December 2012, Vidošić was removed as coach, taking up the role of technical director for the club, with Mike Mulvey, then coach of the Melbourne Victory women's named as his replacement. Vidošić was only manager for thirteen matches before transferring to the new role, similar to the one offered to Postecoglou before his exit earlier in 2012. At the end of the 2012–13 season, the Roar finished in fifth place, carried by striker Besart Berisha's fourteen goals during the season. The club made it to the semi-final in the finals series, bowing out to premiers Western Sydney Wanderers 2–0.

The 2013–14 season began with the Roar winning eight of their first ten games. This form continued for the rest of the season as the club became dominant premiers. Players like Ivan Franjic, Luke Brattan and Dimitri Petratos shone while the return of former captain Matt McKay bolstered the midfield. Brisbane won the grand final 2–1 after extra time against Western Sydney Wanderers. Club talisman Besart Berisha and star utility Ivan Franjic left the club over the off-season for Melbourne Victory and Torpedo Moscow, respectively.

=== Frans Thijssen (interim) 2015 ===
After a run of poor results at the beginning of the 2014–15 season, Mulvey stepped down from the head-coach role. Frans Thijssen was appointed caretaker coach for the remainder of the season.

Thinssen's first game in charge was a 1–1 draw against Perth Glory and ended with a 1–2 defeat against Urawa Red Diamonds. In total Thijssen was in charge for 28 games, winning eleven, drawing five and losing twelve.

Captain Matt Smith left the club in December, joining Bangkok Glass, and was replaced by former captain and club favourite Matt McKay. The season ended with the club recovering to finish in sixth position and qualify for the finals series. Brisbane were knocked out by Adelaide United in the elimination final 2–1.

=== John Aloisi era (2015–2018) ===
On 26 May 2015, John Aloisi was appointed head coach. Amidst off-field drama regarding the club's ownership during his first season as head coach, Aloisi led the Roar to third place on the ladder, narrowly missing out on the championship in the last game of the season and finishing only one point behind eventual champions Adelaide.

The 2015–16 performance was sufficient for the Roar to enter qualification for the 2017 Asian Champions League. After defeating Global F.C. and Shanghai Greenland Shenhua F.C. in 2017, Brisbane qualified for the ACL Group Stage for the fourth time in their history. They were knocked out in the group stage, winning one match and losing four, including a 6–0 defeat to Ulsan Hyundai FC. This, coupled with the Western Sydney Wanderers' 5–1 loss to Shanghai SIPG F.C. on the same day, led to Fox Sports commentators Mark Rudan and Mark Bosnich labelling the matchday as "the darkest day in Australian club football".

Roar's first competitive match of the 2017–18 season was a round-of-32 FFA Cup tie with Melbourne Victory FC at local ground, Perry Park. The home side started with an experimental side with some players playing in positions they were not usually deployed in. The game ended in a 5–1 defeat to their Melbourne opponents. Petros Skapetis scored his first goal for Roar with a shot coming from outside of the box and nestling in the top left corner of the Victory net. The season did not improve much with Brisbane without a win after six matches creating their worst-ever season start. The Roar finally got their first win of the season at home to Melbourne City FC. The score was 3–1, with central defender Avraam Papadopoulos scoring an unlikely brace. Roar slowly climbed the A-league ladder with wins against Western Sydney Wanderers FC, Adelaide United FC and Perth Glory FC in the new year.

After finishing third on the A-league table in the 2016–17 season, Roar gained entry into the second qualifying round of the Asian Champions League, in which they were drawn against Ceres-Negros F.C. The match was to be played at the Queensland Sport and Athletics Centre.

Roar's results slightly improved with more wins against Central Coast Mariners FC, Adelaide United FC and surprise victories over then-current champions and future premiers Sydney FC and future grand final winners Melbourne Victory FC. Roar ended the regular season with wins over Central Coast Mariners and Perth Glory. They managed a sixth-placed finish in the table, earning just two more points than seventh placed Western Sydney Wanderers. This placement gave the Roar qualification for the A-League Finals Series, in which they played Melbourne City in a preliminary final away. Melbourne won 2–0.

The post season review saw numerous changes behind the scenes. The club finally moved in to its purpose built $10m training facility in Logan City in time for pre-season training and a new strength and conditioning coach was hired (from Western Sydney Wanderers), along with a former English Premier League physiotherapist. In addition, Darren Davies was appointed second assistant coach at Aloisi's request. In addition, new player signings were made early, avoiding mistakes of previous seasons, with 21 out of 23 players reporting for pre-season training and – amid growing optimism for the new season with Aloisi promising to turn Suncorp Stadium in to a "fortress" – membership and club sponsorship approached record levels.

Aloisi's team again exited the FFA Cup at the first hurdle, losing 1–0 at home to Melbourne City, despite having been back in pre-season training for six weeks prior to the game. The game was held at Dolphin Oval in Redcliffe in front of a club-record FFA Cup home crowd of 6,151.

Ahead of the new season, Aloisi was very optimistic about Roar's chances following a near-perfect pre-season free from off-field distractions, claiming his side "has never been better".

The season opened with a tense, come-from-behind 1–1 draw against Central Coast Mariners, in front of nearly 15,000 fans. Mariners went on to record the worst-ever start by any A-League club. A second home game the following week saw a goalless draw ith Wellington Phoenix in front of more than 15,000 fans. The next two games were away from home, with a come-from-behind 2–2 draw against Western Sydney Wanderers at the Glen Willow Sports Complex, followed by a 1–2 defeat at Perth Glory. After the first four games, all against sides who had failed to make finals the previous season, Roar were winless with three points but then managed a 2–0 home win against Melbourne City, putting Roar into a finals ladder position for the first time.

Roar went on to lose their next four games, including conceding four goals in consecutive matches, to slump to ninth on the ladder. As the season start went from bad to worse, Aloisi had to defend his team from multiple criticisms, including that many players were too old. On 28 December 2018, despite having received a "vote of confidence" from the board two weeks earlier, Aloisi resigned as manager of Roar, with the club second-bottom on the A-League ladder with one win in nine matches at the time of his departure, the worst-ever start to a season by a Brisbane Roar team. He left as Roar's longest-serving manager.

=== Darren Davies (interim) 2019 ===
Following Aloisi's departure, Darren Davies was appointed interim head coach for an unspecified period. His tenure began with a 2–1 defeat away to Sydney FC and a 2–2 draw away to Newcastle Jets.

On 23 April 2019, the club announced Robbie Fowler as the new head coach, with Davies to take charge for the one remaining A-League game, on ANZAC Day.

Davies' final game in charge ended with a 5–3 home defeat by Adelaide United, in front of almost 12,000 fans including the new head coach. Davies' coaching record was: played 18, won 3, drew 3 and lost 12, scoring 28 goals and conceding 54. The final season of the Aloisi/Davies era saw Roar finish ninth on the ladder, with a home attendance of 9,632, the fourth-best in the competition that season.

=== Fowler era (2019–2020) ===
It was also announced that Tony Grant was joining the coaching team, alongside Fowler. Shortly after Fowler's appointment, the club announced a mass exodus of playing staff, with fourteen players released in late April 2019, including marquee signing Éric Bauthéac.

In June 2019 Fowler announced his first signing in Roy O'Donovan from Newcastle United Jets.

Fowler's first competitive match came in a 2–0 away win at reigning A-League Champions Sydney FC on 7 August 2019 in the FFA Cup.

On 29 June 2020, Roar announced Fowler would not be returning to the club after departing during the COVID-19 crisis. He left with a 45% win record (10 wins from 22 A-League games).

=== Warren Moon era (2020–2023) ===
Following Fowler's departure, the club announced internal appointment Warren Moon as his permanent replacement. He was to manage the senior men's team on an open-ended contract. Moon also maintained his role as academy head coach. Moon was an "A-League Foundation Player", having played sixteen games in Roars first season in the competition. He guided the team to fourth place in his first full season in charge, before losing the elimination final at home to Adelaide United. He also presided over Brisbane's Australia Cup semi-final loss to Sydney United 58. In Moon's second full season at the club, the club fell to eleventh place in the table. He was sacked on 20 February 2023. In total, Moon coached 75 games, winning 22, drawing 22 and losing 31.

=== Nick Green era (2023 R18 to EOS) ===
Following the departure of Warren Moon, the club announced the surprise appointment of Nick Green as interim coach through to the end of the season. Green finished with a nine-game record of 4 wins, 4 losses and a draw.

=== Ross Aloisi era (2023) ===
On 2 May 2023, Ross Aloisi, brother of former coach John, was appointed as head coach. He made a successful competitive debut in a 3–2 win away to Newcastle Jets in the Australia Cup. Ross managed a total of nine A League games, winning 4 and losing 3. In preseason, Ross also coached Roar to their first Australia Cup final, losing 3–1 away to Sydney. Roar were forced to play in Sydney due to the unavailability of Suncorp Stadium.

Ross resigned unexpectedly on Christmas Eve 2023, with his assistant, Luciano Trani, taking charge. He managed one game as Roar, an 8–1 away defeat at Melbourne City. His replacement, Ben Cahn, managed the club for five games, before leaving the club for "personal reasons", resulting in Roar having four coaches in little over a month.

=== Ruben Zadkovich era (2024–2025) ===
Taking over from Ben Cahn on an Interim basis, Ruben Zadkovich led Roar to a ninth-placed finish, but only winning three games out of twelve. He was offered the head coach position on a full-time basis at the end of April 2024.

In his first pre-season and after an early Australia Cup exit at the hands of Perth Glory, Zadkovich took his side to India and participated in the 2024 Bandodkar Trophy. They began the tournament campaign on 24 August, with a 5–1 win over local side Dempo. In their next match, Roar suffered a 1–0 defeat to FC Goa. The club then sealed their spot in semi-finals, defeating Sporting Goa 2–0 in the final group fixture.

The 2024/25 A League season started poorly and Zadkovich’s side recorded the worst start to an A League season in the history of the club and the worst start of any A League team, failing to record a win in their first 12 games.

Roar also recorded an unwanted record losing eight consecutive home games in the A-League Men competition, breaking the mark of seven the now defunct New Zealand Knights team set in 2005

Having finished second last in the ladder, on May 6 the club announced Zadkovich had left the club with immediate effect.

Zadkovich coached a total of 39 games winning just 8 and departed at a time Roars home crowds were at an all time low.

=== Michael Valkanis era (2025–present) ===
On 7 May 2025, Brisbane Roar unveiled former Socceroo Michael Valkanis as Head Coach with his first game being an Australian Cup playoff vs Wellington Phoenix in Darwin. Unfortunately his debut resulted in a defeat, with a disappointing performance. The first half of the season saw Roar perform well despite picking up criticism for their assertive playing style, but the second half of the season was seen as a disappointment with Roar only winning one game after the New Year. Roar finished 2nd last for the second consecutive season and scoring fewer goals that the previous year. Following the seasons conclusion the Roar responded with a massive player clean out, announcing 15 first team departures.

== Crest and colours ==
Orange is Brisbane Roars core colour, reflecting the Dutch heritage of the club. Since separation from Queensland Lions the core colours have morphed slightly in to Orange with black shorts and trim (and not the blue) although for the 20th anniversary of the A League Men season Roar in 2024–25, the club announced it would revert to Orange and Blue as a nod to the past.

The Active Supporters group, The Den, have developed a popular anthem, 'Follow you for ever more', which is sung at most matches paying homage to "the Black and Orange".

Previous club crest (2009–14)

Roar's first kit

=== Evolution of Club colours ===
During the first two seasons the Roar played in a predominantly orange home strip with blue shorts and maroon socks. Queensland sporting teams traditionally play in maroon but the original home strip kept with the colours used by the team in its earlier, Dutch inspired, incarnations.

The colours of orange and blue honoured the club's Dutch origins. On 31 July 2007 the club announced that it had ordered a strip that was half orange and half maroon, but that the colours were manufactured for prominence on television. For season 3 the home kit had been redesigned, the home strip was still orange but featured maroon sleeves, the shorts maroon instead of blue, and orange socks were worn. Danny Tiatto and Craig Moore modelled in the strip launch on 1 August 2007

Before the 2009–10 A-League season, in accordance with the name changing of the club from Queensland Roar to Brisbane Roar, the club's logo was also changed with "Queensland" being dropped to make way for "Brisbane".

On 20 May 2009, Reinaldo and Sergio van Dijk unveiled a new kit for the club, which would be worn for the next two seasons. The club stuck with the maroon and orange they had used for the last kit, but instead opted to drop the white slashes on the home kit. The orange used for the previous kit was brightened to the one used in season 1 of the A-League, with the design of both the new home and away kits changing. The slashes were dropped for a shoulder-pad style. The maroon shoulder pads would be displayed on an orange body, with maroon shorts. This was reversed on the away kit, with the shoulder-pads being orange on a white body with orange shorts.

Prior to the 2011–12 A-League season, the club announced that maroon, which had featured in some way on the club's kits since the A-League inception, would be removed and replaced with black. On 5 September 2011, the club released their kits for the upcoming season. The club showed off their home kit, which was orange with black diagonal shoulders with a thin, white line under the black. This was supported by orange with black banded socks. The away kit would turn out to be predominately black, with only the orange shoulders on the top with the white line underneath and the black with orange banded socks. The same pants would be used for both the home and away kits, which would sport two orange bands and a white band on black pants. The kits released were almost identical to the same design used by Tottenham Hotspur during their 2010–11 season with the only difference being full diagonal sashes and a collared neck instead of a "V" neck.

After two seasons in the diagonally sashed kit, both yielding Final Series soccer, the first season, winning the Grand Final, Puma released a new set of kits, including, for the first time, an alternative strip, deemed by the club as an "Event" kit. The home kit consisted of the usual orange, with black sides, black arm cuffs and a black V-neck collar, which also had a white piece of round-collared fabric attached, which had 3 centrally based lines, white in the centre, orange on the left and black on the right with white on the outside of the black and orange lines. The away kit reverted to the white with orange sides, black arm cuffs and a black V-neck collar. As with the home kit, the away kit had an orange piece of collared fabric attached to the collar, which had 3 centrally based lines, orange in the middle with a white stripe on the left and black on the right of the orange stripe with orange on the outside of the black and white lines. The alternative, or "event" strip, was silver with a top left to bottom right, orange diagonal sash. It also had black arm cuffs and a black V-neck collar with the inner silver fabric and the 3 centrally based stripes. Silver stripe in the middle with a black stripe on either side of the silver stripe and silver on the outside of the two black stripes.

On 15 August 2014, before the 2014 FFA Cup game vs Stirling Lions of the 2014–15 season, the Roar would reveal that Umbro would be making their kits for the next 4 years, ending a 4-year tenure with Puma. Two days later, Brisbane Roar changed their logo to a more "traditional" shield type crest, the biggest change since the club was renamed ahead of the 2009–10 season.

The revelation received mixed reviews, some saying it lost the plastic, American franchise logo feel and some saying it was too bland and that not enough time was put into it. 2 days later, the Roar released their new Umbro home kit, ditching the black pants and going with an all orange kit. The top was completely orange with white piping on the collar; the pants were orange as well with a white vertical strip going 3/4 of the way up the sides of the pants from the bottom, topped off with orange socks; the socks traditionally have two black bands encircling each sock – said to represent the two identities of the club .

== Sponsors ==
Period	Kit manufacturer	Shirt sponsor (AL)	Shirt sponsor (AFC)
2005–2006	Reebok	—	—
2006–2007	Reebok	Jayco	—
2007–2011	Reebok	The Coffee Club	—
2011–2013	Puma	The Coffee Club	The Coffee Club
2013–2014	Puma	The Coffee Club	—
2014–2015	Umbro	The Coffee Club	Griffith University
2015–2016	Umbro	Steadfast	—
2016–2017	Umbro	Steadfast	16Visa.com
2017–2018	Umbro	Central Home Loans	—
2018–2021	Umbro	Actron Air	—
2021–2022	New Balance	Actron Air	—
2022–2023	New Balance	Cars4Us	—
2023–2024	New Balance	Outkast	—
2024–2025	Cikers Australia	Outkast	—

On 30 November 2007, the club signed a two-and-a-half-year deal with cafe chain The Coffee Club to be their main shirt sponsor. The Coffee Club would re-sign with the Roar in August 2010 for another 3 years, making it one of the longest sponsorship deals in the A-League. After the club's licence was taken back by Football Federation Australia in March 2011, the Coffee Club committed their future to the club, signing a $2 Million dollar, 3-year contract extension, sealing their future as sponsors until at least 2015.

At the conclusion of the 2010–11 A-League season, the League's collective kit deal with Reebok came to an end meaning that all A-League clubs could enter into their own separate kit manufacturer agreements. On 2 August 2011, the Roar announced that Puma would be the club's first kit manufacturer decided by the club, and agreed to a three-year deal with the sports brand. The club announced that Puma would manufacture the official playing kits for all Brisbane Roar teams, including the Youth and Women's teams as well as replica kits and other merchandise.

Before the start of the 2014/15 A-League season Brisbane Roar announced that Umbro would be replacing Puma as the club's playing kit and apparel partner for the next four seasons.

On 24 February 2015, it was announced that Griffith University would be the principal kit Sponsor for the 2015 AFC Champions League campaign.

On 3 July 2015, it was announced that former front shirt sponsor, The Coffee Club would not renew its sponsorship with the club for the 2015/16 season. It was then announced that Ladbrokes would be the front shirt sponsor for the Roar's friendly against Liverpool on 17 July 2015.

Steadfast were announced as "Principal Partners" and "Front of Shirt Sponsors" by the club on 10 August 2015 for the duration of the 2015–16 A-League season. Steadfast had previously sponsored the rear of the men's teams' shirts and this new partnership would see the Steadfast logo feature on the shirts of all three Brisbane Roar teams.

Season 2017/18 commenced without a formal sponsor in place so the Roar featured the Starlight Children's Foundation branding on the front of its kits for the initial rounds of the 2017–18 A-League season.

In February 2018 Roar announced Central Home Loans (CHL) had been secured as principal partner and would feature on the front of the men's shirt for the remainder of the season

in July 2018 Roar announced Australian company ActronAir as principal partner, with the company logo to be displayed on the front of the men's shirt as well as feature on the women's team shirts. The value of the two-year deal was undisclosed.

Commercial painting company BBC Painting was later signed as Platinum Partner and back-of-shirt sponsor for the 2019 season.

in July 2023, the architectural design and construction company Outkast (not to be confused with Atlanta rap duo OutKast) signed a 3-year deal as major sponsor.

== Stadium and facilities ==
Roar Men's Team traditional home is the 52,500-capacity Lang Park stadium in Milton although the club has played home A League Men fixtures at five different grounds in its history.

Apart from three seasons permanently away from Lang Park where, during COVID, the club moved fixtures to Dolphin Oval, announcing a return to games in Brisbane in time for the 2023/24 Season . In addition, Roar played two fixtures at Cbus Super Stadium during the 2011 floods, and one game each at Ballymore and Cazalys Stadium in Cairns, and in 2025 announced a home A League fixture at Sunshine Coast Stadium following a hugely successful preseason game there.

Women's fixtures are currently hosted homes games at Imperial Corp Stadium, Newmarket, previously they split between Lang Park, Ballymore, and Perry Park Brisbane.

=== Dolphin Oval ===
Roar had previously hosted home games at Dolphin Oval in Redcliffe including their 2018 FFA Cup game versus Melbourne City, and again in 2019 versus Central Coast Mariners.

Prior to the release of the 2019–20 season fixtures the club announced three games would be switched from Suncorp Stadium to Dolphin Oval increasing their use of the stadium from FFA Cup and W-League matches. The stadium has a capacity of 10,000 including 7,000 seated. After a three-year stay, Roar moved back to Lang Park in Brisbane.

=== Potential new stadium ===
On 6 February 2020 Roar announced plans to fund a $60m boutique stadium of their own. By 2024 plans emerged of a potential joint venture with Football Queensland and a revamped Perry Park. and within weeks the Club Chairman was floating ideas that club owners were willing to invest $7–$10 million "of their own money" to get the project going.

==== Alternative stadiums ====
Throughout their history Roar have hosted games at alternative venues including Cbus Stadium, Spencer Park and Perry Park; typically for Australia Cup games and ACL matches.

At the beginning of the 2010–11 season, during negotiations with the operator of Suncorp Stadium, there were suggestions that the club may move its home games to Ballymore Stadium where the club then had its administration and training facilities. However, the owners of the club opted to stay at Suncorp Stadium on a new restructured contract that would ensure the financial viability of hosting games at the more expensive Suncorp Stadium.

Following the flooding of Suncorp Stadium in the 2010–11 Queensland floods, the Roar were forced to move two home games against Wellington Phoenix and Melbourne Heart to the regular home of Gold Coast United at Skilled Park on the Gold Coast. These matches are the first 'home' league fixtures that the Roar have played at a venue other than Suncorp Stadium in the club's history.

==== Largest attendances ====
In a spectacular 2011 A-League Grand Final, the 50,168 strong fans would make history, being the largest crowd to watch both the Roar and a football match in Brisbane. This was bettered the following season when 50,334 people saw Brisbane defeat Perth in the 2012 A-League Grand Final. The attendance of the 2012 Grand Final would be bettered two years later when the 2013–14 Premiers, the Roar, would do the double, beating Western Sydney Wanderers in the 2014 A-League Grand Final in front of 51,153 passionate fans.

=== Training ground ===
Roar have had a nomadic existence moving between a variety of training venues since the club's separation from Queensland Lions.

The initial training ground was at Lions F.C. while the team was a part of that club but moved to share Ballymore with the Queensland Rugby Union (QRU) in 2008.

During their 2015–16 campaign, the Nathan campus of Griffith University became Brisbane Roar's new training base, with the Roar's contract at long-time training venue Ballymore Stadium expiring, and the field at their previous Perry Park administration base not meeting the standards required by the Roar.

In 2016, Brisbane Roar announced the club would move to a permanent administration and training facility in Logan City. The $9 million Logan Metro Sports Park would also be the headquarters to the club's academy, youth and women's sides, as well as Football Brisbane.

In mid-2017, Roar announced a 5-year deal with QUT to locate their U12-U16 Academy teams at QUT's Kelvin Grove sportsground in Brisbane's North. Prior to the commencement of the 2016–17 season, it was announced that Brisbane would return to Ballymore until their new Logan training centre was complete.

In March 2018 the club formally opened their state-of-the-art Logan Center-of-Excellence with Administration moving in immediately and pre-season training for the men's team commencing in June 2018

In October 2020, after a dispute with Logan City Council over an unpaid water bill, the Roar moved their training base to the Gold Coast Sports Precinct in the suburb of Carrara, Queensland.

Sometime in 2023/2024 the club targeted utilising a new purpose-built facility in Brendale in Brisbane's north.

However, in March 2023 the club announced Roar would be returning to Ballymore for training and to play as many matches as possible.

in October 2023, after less than a month training at Ballymore, the club announced it would be leaving the facility due to concerns over the quality of the training surface and return to QSAC

By July 2026 both Men and Women’s teams were training at the new Brendale facility.

== Affiliations ==
- (Australia) Queensland Lions – Founded the club and withdrew their Senior Men's team from local competition to enter it as Queensland Roar in the inaugural A-League season. Cooperation between the two clubs continues today.
- Academy Partners – Roar have affiliations with several local clubs as part of their Academy Preparation Program. Partnerships include Souths United, Gold Coast City, Grange Thistle SC, Sunshine Coast Wanderers F.C., Cairns F.C., Logan Lightning FC and Olympic FC
- Gareth Edds Soccer Academy – in Townsville, QLD, the BRFC Academy is represented by GESA
- Player Development Project – in July 2018 Roar were announced as a founding partner in the 'Player Development Project' along with Birmingham City FC, Fulham FC and AIK FC. A program designed to help clubs create a learning environment for their coaches
- East Coast Futsal Academy – in June 2019 a partnership between East Coast Futsal Academy in Port Macquarie and the Roar was announced specifically targeting players aged 13–16.

== Ownership and finances ==
=== Current owners (2011–present) ===
Currently, the club is 100% owned by Bakrie Group.

In March 2011, just a week after the club won its first Grand Final, the FFA would take back the club's licence, agreeing to fund the club until new owners were found.

Football Federation Australia CEO Ben Buckley thanked the previous owners for pouring money into the Roar, who said they could not keep up with the future costs for the club.

On 4 October 2011, The World Game reported that Indonesian conglomerate, Bakrie Group, would takeover ownership of the club from the FFA under a 10-year term. Under the terms of the deal, Bakrie Group paid A$8 million for a 70% share of the club, with the FFA retaining the remaining 30% share. Under the terms of this deal, Bakrie Group had the option to purchase a further 20% stake in the club with the FFA holding the remaining 10% share. Following this change of ownership, the new chairman of the Roar was announced as Dali Tahir.

After becoming the first majority-share foreign owner of an A-League team, on 6 February 2012, the FFA announced that Bakrie Group had acquired 100 percent ownership of the Brisbane club.

=== Previous owners (2009–11) ===
On 16 April 2009 reports surfaced that the FFA were willing to purchase up to a 55% share in the Roar to ensure its financial stability. This 55% encompassed CEO Lawrence Oudendyk's 15% per cent interest, the 25% previously owned by Queensland Lions and the 15% share owned by Rob Jones and Rob Jansen.

The FFA advised that any takeover by the FFA would see Oudendyk replaced as CEO. Ultimately a new Brisbane-based ownership structure was formed with investors Emmanuel Drivas, Emmanuel Kokoris, Claude Baradel and Serge Baradel taking over 100% ownership of the club.

On 30 April 2009 the FFA confirmed their offer to take a controlling share in the Roar. The new ownership group declined the FFA's assistance on 22 May 2009. The owners' commitment to the club was reinforced in a statement released by Emmanuel Drivas on behalf of the owners on 12 April 2010 after further speculation that the Roar would require financial assistance from the FFA after a poor 2009–10 season.

=== Founding owners (2004–2008) ===
Brisbane Roar was established and owned by Queensland Lions SC in March 2005 as the team that would represent Brisbane in the newly formed A-League.

Queensland Lions held a majority share in the club through to 2008. It is understood that in 2008 the 25% share owned by Queensland Lions was bought by the Roar board at a discount. This led to financial instability in the club and rumours of the club handing back its A-League licence to Football Federation Australia (FFA).

== Support ==
Brisbane Roar maintains one of the highest average attendances in the Hyundai A League, normally above the competition's season average, and by the end of 2023–24 season a grand total of 2,949,075 supporters had seen Roar home games, giving an all-season average attendance of 11,656.

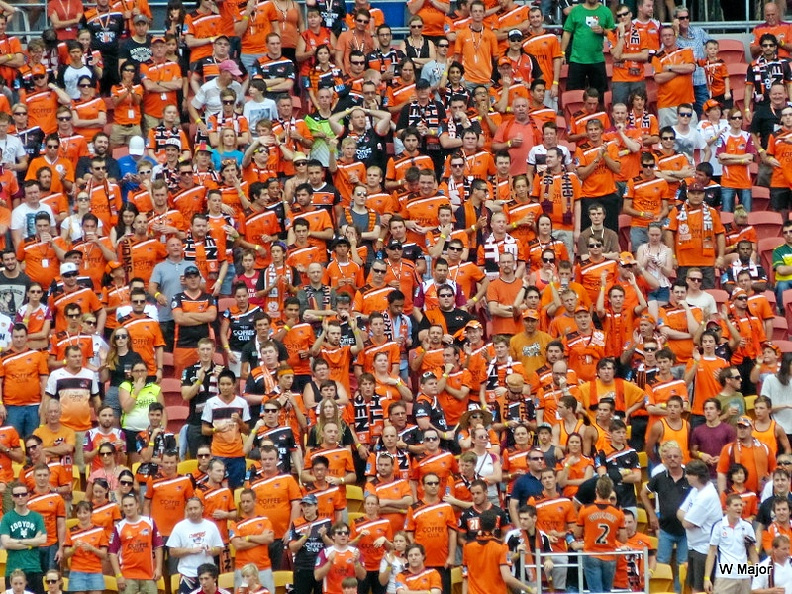
Brisbane Roar supporters at an A-League match against Western Sydney in 2013

The 2018–19 season saw Roar welcome their 2,500,000th A-League Fan through the gates.

Unlike some European clubs all Supporters groups are operated independently of the club itself, and it's not unusual for supporters to come in to conflict with club Management and Owners.

Brisbane has two main supporters groups. The oldest is "The Den" which is the "Active Support Group" located in Bay 332 of the Northern stand of Suncorp Stadium, where they have been since the inaugural season of the A-League. As a Supporters group The Den can trace its origins back to Richlands and Lions F.C.

In 2016, the "Roar Supporters Federation" (RSF) were formed, which is a broad based supporters group intended to give a voice to all fans with club owners and management.

In October 2017, the RSF launched a dedicated supporters group for Brisbane's W-League side – "The Roar Corps" to be modelled on support groups in the American National Women's Soccer League.

A third supporters group exists on Facebook called the Brisbane Roar Supporters Club (BRSC). Founded in 2014, this is an open group, with nearly seven thousand members, and is often considered a melting-pot of supporters thinking.

Supporter groups have emerged in cities away from Brisbane including "Roar Fans in Melbourne", "Roar Fans in Sydney", "Roar Fans in Tasmania", "Roar Fans in Adelaide", and "Roar Fans on the Gold Coast".

=== Dispute between club and Active Support ===
In January 2019, Roar became the latest A-League club to become embroiled in a dispute with active supporters.

Hours before kickoff of their round 14 fixture against Melbourne Victory the club announced that they were withdrawing their support from the incumbent steering committee of "The Den".

The remainder of the season was played out with no formal active support.

== Mascots ==
The Brisbane Roar's mascots are Roary and Rosie, a Lion and Lioness.

They feature prominently in match day activations as well as participating in various club events, including community appearances, sponsor events, pre-season matches, in addition to ALW/ALM games.

The roles are normally filled by club volunteers and Roar actively looks for individuals to fill these roles, performing as Roary or Rosie.

== Rivalries ==
- The Roar currently have no obvious rivals.
- Gold Coast United – Now defunct. Known as the M1 Derby, it shared the name of the main highway between the two cities, the M1. Due to Brisbane's close proximity to the Gold Coast, Brisbane Roar's geographical derby opponent was naturally going to be Gold Coast United. The glitzy Coast side only won 1 more game between the two (4 to 3), having won the first 3 games, all in Gold Coast's first season of 2009–10. They would, however, win only 1 of the 6 other games the two sides would play. The rivalry, however, concluded on 5 April 2012 when Football Federation Australia officially announced the axing of the Gold Coast side. There was also a rivalry with (now defunct) North Queensland Fury due to both clubs being in the same state although it was widely considered a regular match due to the distance between the two teams. The Fury was axed just a year prior to Gold Coast United being culled.
- Perth Glory – following an incident in the 2012 A League Grand Final with the winning goal for Brisbane coming from a controversial penalty awarded in Bersart Berisha, a fierce rivalry resulted requiring Roar to keep travel plans in to Western Australia a secret. 14 years later and Glory fans still take to social media to complain.

== Players ==
=== First team squad ===
As of 4 September 2026

Note: Flags indicate national team as defined under FIFA eligibility rules; some limited exceptions apply. Players may hold more than one non-FIFA nationality.

No.	Pos.	Nation	Player
1	GK	AUS	Dean Bouzanis
2	DF	AUS	Jacob Nasso
3	DF	AUS	Dimitri Valkanis
5	DF	SCO	Tom Aldred (captain)
6	MF	AUS	Noah Maieroni (scholarship)
8	MF	AUS	Tyrese Francois
9	FW	MDA	Virgiliu Postolachi
10	MF	KOR	Nam Tae-hee
11	FW	GER	Marko Ilic
13	DF	AUS	Tate Russell
14	MF	AUS	Emin Durakovic
15	DF	AUS	Hosine Bility
16	DF	AUS	Joel King

No.	Pos.	Nation	Player
17	FW	AUS	Justin Vidic
19	FW	AUS	Sabit Ngor
21	MF	AUS	Max Court (scholarship)
22	FW	AUS	Nathan Amanatidis
23	GK	AUS	Oscar Page (scholarship)
38	MF	AUS	Taj Sorensen (scholarship)
39	FW	AUS	Niall Thom (scholarship)
40	GK	AUS	George Plusnin (scholarship)
41	MF	AUS	Emmett Shaw (scholarship)
44	MF	AUS	Jordan Lauton
53	DF	AUS	Archie Mitchell (scholarship)
77	MF	BIH	Milorad Stajić

=== Youth ===
Players to have been featured in a first-team matchday squad for Brisbane Roar in a competitive match

Note: Flags indicate national team as defined under FIFA eligibility rules; some limited exceptions apply. Players may hold more than one non-FIFA nationality.

No.	Pos.	Nation	Player
32	DF	AUS	Charlie Parkin
33	DF	NZL	Jackson O'Reilly

No.	Pos.	Nation	Player
35	DF	AUS	Mikael Evagorou-Alao
36	FW	AUS	Ianni Valkanis

== Notable Player Transfers ==
Notable player transfers include

2007

Spase Dilevski to FC U Craiova 1948 for €375,000 (Romania)

2011

Matt Mackay to Rangers F.C. for £250,000 (Scotland, Scottish Premier League).

Reinaldo to Al-Raed for €500,000 (Saudi Arabia)

2017

Tommy Oar to APOEL F.C. for €350,000 (Cyprus, Cypriot First Division).

2019

Adam Taggart to Suwon Bluewings for $150,000 (estimate) (Korea, K-League).

2025

Thomas Waddingham to Portsmouth F.C. (England, English Football League Championship)

2026

Lucas Herrington to Colorado Rapids F.C. (Record Fee, A$1,560,000) (USA, Major League Soccer).

Sam Klein to F.C. St. Pauli (Germany, Bundesliga).

== End of Season Awards ==
The Brisbane Roar FC End of Season Awards are held at the end of each season with the men’s Player of the Year awarded the Gary Wilkins Medal and the Women’s, the Kate McShea Medal.

== Club officials ==
=== Management ===
Position	Name
Chairman & CEO	(Australia) Kaz Patafta
Vice-chairman	vacant
Director	(Indonesia) Faisal Arief Subandi
Director	(Indonesia) Helmi Rahman
Director and company secretary	vacant
Sporting director	(England) James Gow

=== Football Department ===
Position	Name
A-League Men Team
Head Coach	(Australia) Michael Valkanis
Senior Assistant Coach	(Italy) Iacopo La Rocca
Individual Development coach	(Australia) Andy Bernal
Head Goalkeeping coach	(England) Tom Fawdry
Head of Analysis	(Russia) Maxim Gaydovskiy
Head of Performance	(Australia) Tim Schleiger
Kit and Equipment Officer	(Australia) Lloyd Cabilan
Head of Football Operations	(Australia) Shane Stefanutto
Head of Medical	(Australia) Luis Resa
Chief Medical Officer	(Australia) Dr Dougal Middleton
Head Strength and Conditioning Coach	(New Zealand) Raffaele Moro
Club Physiotherapist	(Canada) Tevan Sandhu
A-League Youth Team
Head coach	vacant
Assistant coach	(Liberia) Sekou Jomanday
A-League Women Team
Head coach	(Australia) Johnathan Clemente
Assistant coach	vacant
Team manager	vacant

=== Administration ===
Position	Name
Executive chairman	vacant
General manager	vacant
Commercial manager	Charlie Mann
General manager – club services	Rizka Laya
Marketing manager	Sean Nicoll
Media officer	Sonia Emanuel
Digital & design coordinator	Armando Cacace
Memberships manager	Josh Springfield
Memberships officer	Jonas Kissel & Breanne Clarke
Chief operations officer	Zac Anderson
Finance director	Damien Moffrey
Finance manager	Novita Dumais
Finance officer	vacant
Academy administrator	Klui Lapun

== Coaching History ==
To coach in the A-League Men, Coaches need to be a minimum of 18 years old and possess the Football Australia Pro-Diploma, otherwise known as Pro A-Licence

For a List of Brisbane Roar FC head coaches see the related page.

== Captaincy History ==
Brisbane have had eight captains throughout their A-League history with Matt McKay holding the position on two separate occasions:

Dates	Name	Notes	Honours (as captain)
2005–2006	(Australia) Chad Gibson	Inaugural club captain, 14 games as Captain	
2006–2007	(Australia) Stuart McLaren	15 games as Captain	
2007–2009	(Australia) Craig Moore	44 games as Captain	Player of the Season both years
2009–2012	(Australia) Matt McKay	First spell as captain	2010–11 A-League Premiership; 2010–11 A-League Championship
2012–2014	(Australia) Matt Smith	Most successful captain, 37 games	2011–12 A-League Championship; 2013–14 A-League Premiership; 2013–14 A-League Championship
2014–2019	(Australia) Matt McKay	88 games as Captain & most A-League appearances (272)	
2019–2024	(Scotland) Tom Aldred	First foreign captain, 104 games as Captain. Longest serving Captain.	Player of the Season 22–23
2024–2026	(Republic of Ireland) Jay O'Shea	48 games as Captain	Players Player of the Season for 6 consecutive seasons
2026-	(Scotland) Tom Aldred	2nd stint as Captain	

== Honours ==
=== A-League ===
==== Brisbane Roar ====
Chart of yearly table positions for Brisbane Roar in A-League Men

- A-League Men Championship
  - Winners (3): 2011, 2012, 2014
- A-League Men Premiership
  - Winners (2): 2010–11, 2013–14
  - Runners-up (1): 2011–12

=== Domestic cups ===
==== Brisbane Lions ====
- NSL Cup
  - Winners (1): 1981

==== Brisbane Roar ====
- Australia Cup
  - Runners-up (1): 2023

=== BPL ===
==== Brisbane Lions and Queensland Lions ====
- Brisbane Premier League
  - Winners (7): 1987, 1990, 1991, 1996, 2002, 2003, 2004
  - Runners-up (3): 1989, 1994, 2000
- Brisbane Premier League Finals
  - Winners (5): 1987, 1991, 1996, 2002, 2003, 2004
  - Runners-up (1): 1990

== Records ==
- Biggest win – Brisbane Roar 7–1 Adelaide United, 28 October 2011.
- Biggest defeat – Brisbane Roar 1–8 Melbourne City, A-League, 28 December 2023
- Most consecutive games without defeat – 36, 18 September 2010 – 26 November 2011
- Most consecutive away games without defeat – 16, 3 October 2010 to 19 November 2011 (A-League record).
- Fastest goal scored – 32s, Florin Berenguer vs. Wellington Phoenix, 4th November 2023
- Fastest goal conceded – 40s, Aaron Calver, Sydney, 29 March 2019.
- Most appearances – 304, Jack Hingert
- All-time top scorer – 50 Bersart Berisha (48 league goals plus 2 in the Asian Champions League).
- Fastest hat-trick – 6 minutes, Besart Berisha v Adelaide United, 28 October 2011.
- Highest attendance – 51,153, 2014 Grand Final vs. Western Sydney Wanderers.
- Most games coached – John Aloisi, 95 games, 2015–2018
- Youngest player – Quinn MacNicol, 15 years and 216 days, 14 August 2023
- Youngest goal scorer – Quinn MacNicol, 15 years and 228 days, 26 August 2023 vs. Sydney United 58.

== Hall of Fame ==
BRFC's Hall of Fame was inaugurated in 2017. To date it has three inductees:

- Thomas Broich
- Michael Theo
- Matt McKay

== Academy ==
In July 2020 the club announced a partnership with Morton Bay Council for the development of an $18m training facility for use of the W-League team and the club's Academy

The Roar Academy has three pathways:

=== Brisbane Academy ===
The Club launched its Academy in January 2018. and provides development for boys in the U14 age group through to U19.

=== Pre-Academy ===
The Pre-Academy serves players in the U10 age group up to U13 and is delivered through a network of partner clubs.

=== Pathway for Girls ===
The Academy does not currently accommodate girls. Instead BRFC and Football Queensland partner to deliver the National Training Center (NTC) curriculum. Development teams compete in National Premier Leagues (Queensland) under the name "Brisbane Roar NTC" in acknowledgment of this partnership. An approach that was further strengthened in September 2024 further aligning female pathways between FQ and Brisbane Roar

== Controversies ==
In 2009, Football Federation Australia revoked the club's Licence to participate. In addition, there were suggestions the FFA would use this opportunity to change certain branding elements including colours and the lion on the shirt. These changes did not eventuate but the club's name was changed to reflect its identity as a Brisbane club as other QLD sides entered the competition.

In 2009, head coach Frank Farina's second charge for drink-driving within two-and-a-half years occurred as he made his way to training, which forced Roar to launch an internal investigation, that led to his sacking.

In 2015, Roar switched their home Asian Champions League games away from Brisbane and instead played them on The Gold Coast, a distance of 83 km, having earlier teased fans with an “exciting times ahead" announcement leaving fans frustrated. This move angered many supporters.

In 2015 the club endured a financial crisis with FFA CEO David Gallop instructed the club owners to immediately address the Roar's financial problems or have their A-League licence revoked. Bakrie Group injected an initial sum of $1m to stabilise the club's finances before successfully retaining ownership of the club.

In 2015, star midfielder Luke Brattan walked out on the club over unpaid Super contributions.

In 2016, Roar Director Daniel Cobb blamed Bakrie Group for late player payments. A crisis engulfed Brisbane Roar when the club's managing director effectively accused club owners of lying over promises to fund the club properly. Cobb eventually quit on the eve of the season start.

In 2017, just 14 months after being appointed by club owners to replace Cobb, MD Mark Kingsman was fired in a surprise move by Roar chairman Rahim Soekasah who cited continued growth, greater governance and oversight and deeper connection with members, the business sector and the wider community as reasons for the move.

In 2018, Roar's peeling shirt numbers and a shock loss to Ceres-Negros in the Asian Champions League caused embarrassment with supporters calling it the "lowest moment in the club's history". The club were forced to make a public apology in relation to the incident.

In 2019, in January the organising committee of 'The Den' supporters group withdrew organisation of Active Support issued demands on the club and refused to organise support for games until they were met, in response the club withdrew recognition of the organising committee.

In late 2020, a public dispute erupted between Roar and Logan City Council over $150,000 of unpaid bills that resulted in the club abandoning the base after just two years of tenancy. A facility built for football was then handed over to a Rugby Club.

In 2021 the Holman v Brisbane Roar Court case confirmed Bret Holman was entitled to recover insurance payments made to club but withheld from the player.

In August 2022, Corey Brown had his contract terminated over alleged misconduct but after a long dispute with the PFA the player was eventually cleared and reinstated.

In October 2022, the club abandoned its youth academy to focus on its First and U23 teams. In a move described as "a shambles" and one that angered players and fans

In October 2024, Roar and Football Queensland announced a collaboration in men's player pathways which inspired a club mutiny involving several NPL clubs, with anger aimed at both BRFC and FQ

In May 2025, the ATO issued a winding up order against Brisbane Roar over unpaid debts. The third such winding order against the club

in June 2025, Roar took its major sponsor and front-of-shirt sponsor OutKast to court over an alleged $130,000 in moneys owed. In return, OutKast stated they had terminated the agreement and Roar were in breach of their agreement

In July 2025 a further winding up order was placed against at the club relating to debts incurred by the Recruitment company that hired Kaz and Zac to their roles was placed

In June 2026 it was leaked that the club had sold their 20% sell-on clause for Lucas Herrington back to Colorado Rapids F.C. for $560k who was subsequently transferred to Hull City in the EPL costing BRFC a loss of between $3 million and $6 million in lost transfer revenue

== See also ==
- Brisbane Roar FC (W-League)
- Brisbane Roar FC Reserves
- Season History
- List of Brisbane Roar FC Head Coaches
- Brisbane Roar FC End of Season Awards
