= Luciano Trani =

Australian soccer player

Personal information
- Full name: Luciano Trani
- Date of birth: 10 August 1966 (age 60)
- Place of birth: Melbourne, Australia
- Height: 1.78 m (5 ft 10 in)
- Position: Midfielder

Team information
- Current team: Zhejiang FC (assistant coach)

Senior career*
Years	Team	Apps	(Gls)
- Thomastown Devils
- Melton Reds
- Fawkner Blues

Managerial career
- 2003–2004: Fawkner Blues
- 2004: Whittlesea Stallions
- 2006: Essendon Royals
- 2007: Fawkner Blues
- 2009–2011: Wellington Phoenix (asst coach)
- 2011–2012: Adelaide United (asst coach)
- 2013–2014: Brisbane Roar (asst coach)
- 2014–2016: Melbourne City (asst coach)
- 2016: Newcastle Jets (asst coach)
- 2018: North Geelong Warriors FC
- 2020: Sint-Truidense V.V. (assistant)
- 2021–2023: Melbourne Victory (assistant)
- 2023: Brisbane Roar (assistant)
- 2023: Brisbane Roar (caretaker)
- 2024: Brisbane Roar (assistant)
- 2026–: Zhejiang FC (assistant)
- * Club domestic league appearances and goals as of 28 July 2023 ‡ National team caps and goals as of 25 July 2011

Luciano Trani (born 10 August 1966 in Melbourne, Victoria) is an Australian former soccer player who currently serves as the assistant manager of Chinese Super League club Zhejiang FC.

== Coaching career ==
Trani began coaching at the Victorian Premier League and National Soccer League levels with the Fawkner Blues, Essendon Royals, Whittlesea Stallions, Brisbane Strikers and the Melbourne Knights. He then took up roles as a coaching instructor for Football Federation Victoria and Head Coach of Pascoe Vale FC, before joining Wellington Phoenix. He then transferred to a job at Adelaide United where he joined as Assistant coach and was the Acting Coach

On 23 August 2012, Trani had left his post at Adelaide United after rejecting a reshuffle into a youth coaching role. Trani was officially announced as the new assistant coach of Brisbane Roar FC on 8 August 2013. After a title-winning season with Brisbane Roar, he moved to take up the same role at league rivals Melbourne City FC in May 2014.

In May 2016, Trani parted ways with Melbourne City FC.

One month later, he joined the Newcastle Jets as their assistant coach. However, he was sacked so as to resolve internal issues between himself and the head coach, Scott Miller.

Trani returned to management in October 2017, when he took up a role as senior head coach of National Premier Leagues Victoria 2 side North Geelong Warriors FC. Trani resigned from his position on 7 May 2018.

Trani joined Belgian First Division A club Sint-Truidense V.V. as an assistant coach in 2020.

On 1 July 2021, Trani joined Melbourne Victory FC as an assistant coach.

On 28 July 2023, Trani joined Brisbane Roar as an assistant for the second time. On 24 December 2023, he was announced as interim coach of Brisbane Roar, following the departure of head coach Ross Aloisi. After one match in charge, in which the team lost 1–8 to Melbourne City, the club appointed Ben Cahn as head coach to replace Trani who returned to his assistant coach role.

On 10 January 2026, Trani was nnounced as the new assistant coach of Chinese Super League club Zhejiang FC.
