= Mike Mulvey =

Australian-English football manager

Personal information
- Date of birth: 25 February 1963 (age 63)
- Place of birth: Manchester, England
- Position: Midfielder

Team information
- Current team: South West Queensland Thunder (head coach)

Youth career
- 1980–1982: Manchester United

Senior career*
Years	Team	Apps	(Gls)
1983–1986	Brisbane Lions		

Managerial career
- 1998: Ipswich Knights FC
- 1999–2007: Queensland Sting
- 2007–2009: Australia U20 (assistant)
- 2007–2010: QAS
- 2009–2012: Gold Coast United (youth)
- 2010–2012: Gold Coast United (assistant)
- 2012: Gold Coast United (caretaker)
- 2012: Melbourne Victory FC W-League
- 2012–2014: Brisbane Roar
- 2015–2016: Sabah FA (technical director)
- 2015–2016: Sabah FA
- 2016–2017: Terengganu (technical director)
- 2017: Terengganu (caretaker)
- 2017: BEC Tero Sasana
- 2018–2019: Central Coast Mariners
- 2019–2021: Western Pride (technical director)
- 2025–: South West Queensland Thunder (head coach)
- * Club domestic league appearances and goals

Mike Mulvey (born 25 February 1963) is an Australian-English football manager, who is the former technical director and current head coach of South West Queensland Thunder. He had previously been in charge of clubs in Australia, Thailand and Malaysia.

Mulvey is best known for his coaching performance in 2013–14, when he took Brisbane Roar to their record-breaking third A-League title. He was named A-League Coach of the Year in the same season – just 12 months after being named W-League Coach of the Year.

In December 2014, he was named as the Queensland's Coach of the Year at the annual state coaching awards.

== Playing career ==
Born in Manchester, Mulvey began his playing career as a trainee at Manchester United, before his family decided to emigrate to Australia in 1982. Once arriving in Brisbane, he soon signed with National Soccer League club Brisbane Lions (now Brisbane Roar), where spent several seasons. He later joined his brother Phil at North Star in the Brisbane Premier League.

== Managerial career ==
Mulvey's first senior coaching role was as the inaugural coach of Ipswich Knights in 1998.

Mulvey was the assistant coach at former A-League club Gold Coast United. On 20 February 2012, it was announced Mulvey had been appointed caretaker coach of Gold Coast, after Head Coach Miron Bleiberg left.

After the club dissolved, he joined Melbourne Victory as the women's team coach. Mulvey transformed the team into W-League championship contenders, sparking interest from A-League clubs.

In December 2012, Mulvey was appointed Head Coach at Brisbane Roar Football Club on an interim basis. In February 2013, Mulvey was appointed as the permanent Head Coach at the club. Following his appointment, Brisbane Roar only lost one of their remaining seven regular season matches.

He went on to take the Roar to the semifinals in the Hyundai A-league's 2012/13 season, losing 2–1 to Premier's Plate winners Western Sydney Wanderers in the preliminary final.

The following season, 2013/14, Mulvey took the Roar to winning their second Premier's Plate and third A-League Championship in four years. Mulvey's Roar won the Premier's Plate by 10 points, the second largest margin in the history of the A-League. The team then went on to beat Melbourne Victory 1–0 in the semi-final and then beating the Western Sydney Wanderers 2–1 after extra time in the Grand Final to win the 2013/2014 A-League Championship.

On 23 November 2014, Mulvey was sacked from his position as manager of the Brisbane Roar after a series of defeats

Despite the successful 2013–14 season, Brisbane Roar managed only one win out of 6 games at the beginning of the 2014–15 season and on 23 November 2014, Mulvey stepped down from the role of head coach.

In February 2015, Mulvey was appointed as a Technical Director for Sabah FA, before officially become the head coach for the club in less than a month.

Mulvey moved on to become Technical Director at Malaysian Premier League club Terengganu in July 2016, before being installed as caretaker manager. He left the club at the end of the season.

Mulvey was hired by Thai League 1 side Police Tero F.C. at the commencement of the 2017 Season and despite playing with the league's smallest budget, he steered the Bangkok club to safety.

Just three months after arriving in Thailand, Mulvey was voted to take charge of the Thai League 1 All-Stars for their match against the Thailand national team at the Bannayinda Stadium in August 2017. The match finished in a 3–3 draw.

In April 2018, Mulvey was announced as the new head coach of the Central Coast Mariners, replacing Paul Okon. In March 2019, he parted ways with the club.

In October 2019, Mulvey returned to Queensland and joined Western Pride FC in a dual role as Technical Director and Youth Coach, winning the Football Queensland Premier League U-18 Title in his first season in charge, going through the season undefeated.

He subsequently accepted a combined position as the Technical Director for Football Queensland Premier League side South West Queensland Thunder FC and as Head Coach at Toowoomba Grammar School.

== Coaching style ==
In an interview with the Sydney Morning Herald in 2014, Mulvey's Roar side was lauded for playing "the most tactically savvy and technically proficient football of the year".

Mulvey said his ideal tactical style embraced a flexible system designed to keep possession with a pro-active, high-tempo style: "I don't like seeing long-ball. I'll switch the television off if someone starts with that stuff. My teams play football the way I like it played – you keep possession, you pass, you attack."

== Managerial statistics ==
As of 31 August 2021.

Team	Nat	From	To	Record				
Team	Nat	From	To	G	W	D	L	Win %
Gold Coast United Youth	Australia	13 September 2009	4 March 2012	61	30	15	16	49.18
Gold Coast United (caretaker)	Australia	22 February 2012	25 March 2012	7	1	3	3	14.29
Melbourne Victory W-League	Australia	20 October 2012	18 December 2012	9	5	1	3	55.56
Brisbane Roar	Australia	18 December 2012	23 November 2014	56	28	7	21	50.00
Sabah FA	Malaysia	1 April 2015	30 November 2015	8	4	2	2	50.00
Terengganu FA	Malaysia	1 December 2015	17 July 2016	11	4	1	6	36.36
BEC Tero Sasana	Thailand	June 2017	November 2017	24	8	5	11	33.33
Central Coast Mariners	Australia	11 April 2018	10 March 2019	22	1	4	17	4.55
Western Pride (Youth)	Australia	1 October 2019	1 February 2021	11	8	3	0	72.73
Total				208	89	41	78	42.79

== Honours ==
=== As a Manager ===
Brisbane Roar

- A-League Premiership: 2013–14
- A-League Championship: 2013–14
