= Warren Moon (soccer) =

Australian footballer (born 1982)

Personal information
- Date of birth: 27 May 1982 (age 44)
- Place of birth: Gravesend, England
- Height: 1.83 m (6 ft 0 in)
- Position: Midfielder

Team information
- Current team: Visakha FC (head coach)

Youth career
- Taringa Rovers

Senior career*
Years	Team	Apps	(Gls)
2003–2004	Brisbane Strikers		
2005–2006	Queensland Roar	16	(3)
2006–2007	Queen of the South	15	(2)
2008	Eastern Suburbs	12	(0)
2009	Brisbane Strikers		
2010–2014	Peninsula Power		
2014–2016	Queensland Lions	34	(5)

Managerial career
- 2008: Eastern Suburbs
- 2012–2014: Peninsula Power
- 2014–2019: Lions FC
- 2020–2023: Brisbane Roar
- 2023–2024: Papua New Guinea
- 2023–2024: Papua New Guinea U23
- 2025–2026: Central Coast Mariners (caretaker)
- 2026–: Visakha FC
- * Club domestic league appearances and goals

Warren Moon (born 27 May 1982) is an English-born Australian soccer manager and former player who is the head coach of Cambodian Premier League (CPL) club Visakha FC.

== Club career ==
=== Brisbane Strikers ===
Moon completed his schooling at Marist College Rosalie in Brisbane and joined the Brisbane Strikers from 2003 in the National Soccer League (NSL). He played in the 2003 and 2004 seasons before the NSL was superseded by the Australian A-League.

=== Queensland Roar ===
Moon was signed by Queensland Roar for the 2005 inaugural A-League season. He played with the Queensland Roar, where he made 14 appearances and scored 2 goals.

At the end of the 2005 season, Moon travelled to Scotland to trial with Hibernian.

=== Queen of the South ===
When Moon was not offered a contract with Hibernian, he signed with Queen of the South on 31 August 2006. Moon then returned to Australia after struggling with injury and signed as a coach/player for Brisbane Premier League First Division team Eastern Suburbs in 2008.

== Managerial career ==
=== Eastern Suburbs ===
Moon took charge of Eastern Suburbs in the Brisbane Premier League Division 1 for 2008. In his first full year of coaching he took the club from 10th the previous year to champions, on the way making it to the Premier Cup Grand Final where they were beaten on penalties by Peninsula Power.

=== Brisbane Strikers ===
In 2009, Moon signed for the Brisbane Strikers in the Queensland state league.

=== Peninsula Power ===
After securing the 2009 QSL champions medal, Moon signed for the 2009 Brisbane Premier League champions Peninsula Power.

=== Queensland Lions ===
In 2012 Moon was appointed head coach along with longtime friend and player Scott Macnicol. At the end of the 2014 season he was offered head coach of Queensland Lions, where he once trained with the Queensland Roar.

=== Anglican Church Grammar School ===
Moon also coached the Anglican Church Grammar School First XI, with his last season at the school being in 2019.

Warren Moon was head coach of the First XI at Anglican Church Grammar School. In 2019, he coached the school to their first GPS Football premiership.

=== Brisbane Roar ===
Moon left the school after accepting an offer to become the new general manager of the Brisbane Roar Academy in 2019.

On 16 July 2020 the Roar appointed Moon to the A-League head coaching role replacing interim coach Darren Davies after winning just 3 games in his 18 match spell.

Moon was sacked by the club on 20 February 2023 after a 1–1 draw with Sydney FC that extended the team's run without a win to 7 games and left them in 2nd last place on the table. His final statistics as Brisbane manager were 22 wins, 22 draws (29% respectively) and 31 (41%) losses, qualifying for the A-League finals twice & being knocked out in the first week both occasions, and a highest finish in the Australia Cup of the semi-final in the 2022 edition, losing 3–2 to NPL team Sydney United.

=== Central Coast Mariners ===
Moon was appointed as the interim coach of A-League Men club Central Coast Mariners (CCM), a week out from the beginning of the 2025–26 season, after the sudden departure of Mark Jackson. On 31 December 2025, during the club's annual New Year's Eve home match at Central Coast Stadium, he was involved in an altercation with head coach Michael Valkanis (who picked up a red card that resulted in a one-match suspension) of his old club Brisbane Roar (who won 2–1) in the tunnel at half-time, which he claimed resulted in misconduct that led to the police being called. These claims were denied by the Roar, who threatened legal action in a statement released on 1 January 2026 (New Year's Day), while Football Australia launched a review into the incident. He departed the club at the end of the season, with Mariners finishing in ninth place.

=== Visakha FC ===
During the 2026–27 season, Moon was appointed head coach of Cambodian Premier League (CPL) club Visakha FC, replacing English manager Scott Cooper who became the club's technical director.

== Managerial statistics ==
As of 3 March 2026

Team	Nat	From	To	Record				
Team	Nat	From	To	G	W	D	L	Win %
Brisbane Roar	(Australia)	2020	2023	83	28	22	33	33.73
Central Coast Mariners	(Australia)	October 2025	Present	18	6	5	7	33.33
Total				101	34	27	40	33.66
