= Darren Davies (Welsh footballer) =

Welsh footballer and coach (born 1978)

Personal information
- Date of birth: 13 August 1978 (age 48)
- Place of birth: Port Talbot, Wales
- Position: Left back

Team information
- Current team: Al-Ettifaq (assistant)

Youth career
- Tottenham Hotspur

Senior career*
Years	Team	Apps	(Gls)
1998–????	Barry Town		
2000–2001	Greenock Morton	22	(0)
2001–2002	Stirling Albion	1	(0)
- Dover Athletic
- Tiverton Town
2004–2005	Forest Green Rovers	29	(0)
- Merthyr Tydfil
2008–2009	Port Talbot Town		
2009–2010	Redland City Devils		

International career
- Wales U21

Managerial career
- 2011–2016: Melbourne Victory Youth
- 2018–2019: Brisbane Roar (caretaker)
- 2021: Swansea City U16
- 2021–2023: Swansea City U18
- * Club domestic league appearances and goals

Darren Davies (born 13 August 1978) is a Welsh former professional footballer and coach who is the assistant coach of Saudi Pro League club Al-Ettifaq.

== Club career ==
A Wales U21 international, Davies started his career at Tottenham Hotspur in England, before becoming a member of the Barry Town squad to compete in the UEFA Champions League qualifying stages. He later plied his trade in Scotland at Greenock Morton and Stirling Albion, before dropping into non-league football in England and Wales.

== Managerial career ==
Davies has since relocated to Australia, initially employed as head coach at the Queensland Academy of Sport prior to taking a role at Melbourne Victory. In March 2013, he coached his team to success in the National Youth League Championship, and was also promoted to the assistant job of the senior squad, following Ange Postecoglou's promotion to the Socceroos.

On 24 July 2015, Davies was appointed as Paul Okon's assistant coach for the Young Socceroos, alongside his roles at Melbourne Victory.

On 30 May 2016, Gareth Naven was appointed as the coach of Melbourne Victory's NYL&NPL sides instead of him.

On 8 August 2016, Davies was appointed as an assistant coach at Melbourne Victory.

In June 2017, Davies, along with Kevin Muscat and Ross Aloisi, were called up by Ange Postecoglou to serve as members of Australia's coaching staff for the 2017 FIFA Confederations Cup.

On 28 December 2018, Davies was appointed as the caretaker coach of Brisbane Roar after the resignation of manager John Aloisi. Davies resumed his previous duty as assistant coach for Brisbane Roar following the appointment of Robbie Fowler as the club's new head coach.

In summer 2021, Davies joined Swansea City as their under 16s coach, and was quickly promoted to under 18s coach by November, when Byron Anthony left to become Bristol Rovers Academy Manager.

In October 2023, Davies moved to Cardiff City as the capital city club's new individual development coach. His role is overseeing an "elite training group" which will feature the best young talents from the academy as well as fringe players from the first team.

In February 2024, Davies joined Saudi Pro League side Al-Ettifaq as first-team coach, working under manager Steven Gerrard.

== Managerial statistics ==
As of 4 June 2019

Team	Nat	From	To	Record				
Team	Nat	From	To	G	W	D	L	Win %
Brisbane Roar	(Australia)	December 2018	May 2019	18	3	3	12	16.67
Total				18	3	3	12	16.67
