= List of Western Sydney Wanderers FC records and statistics =

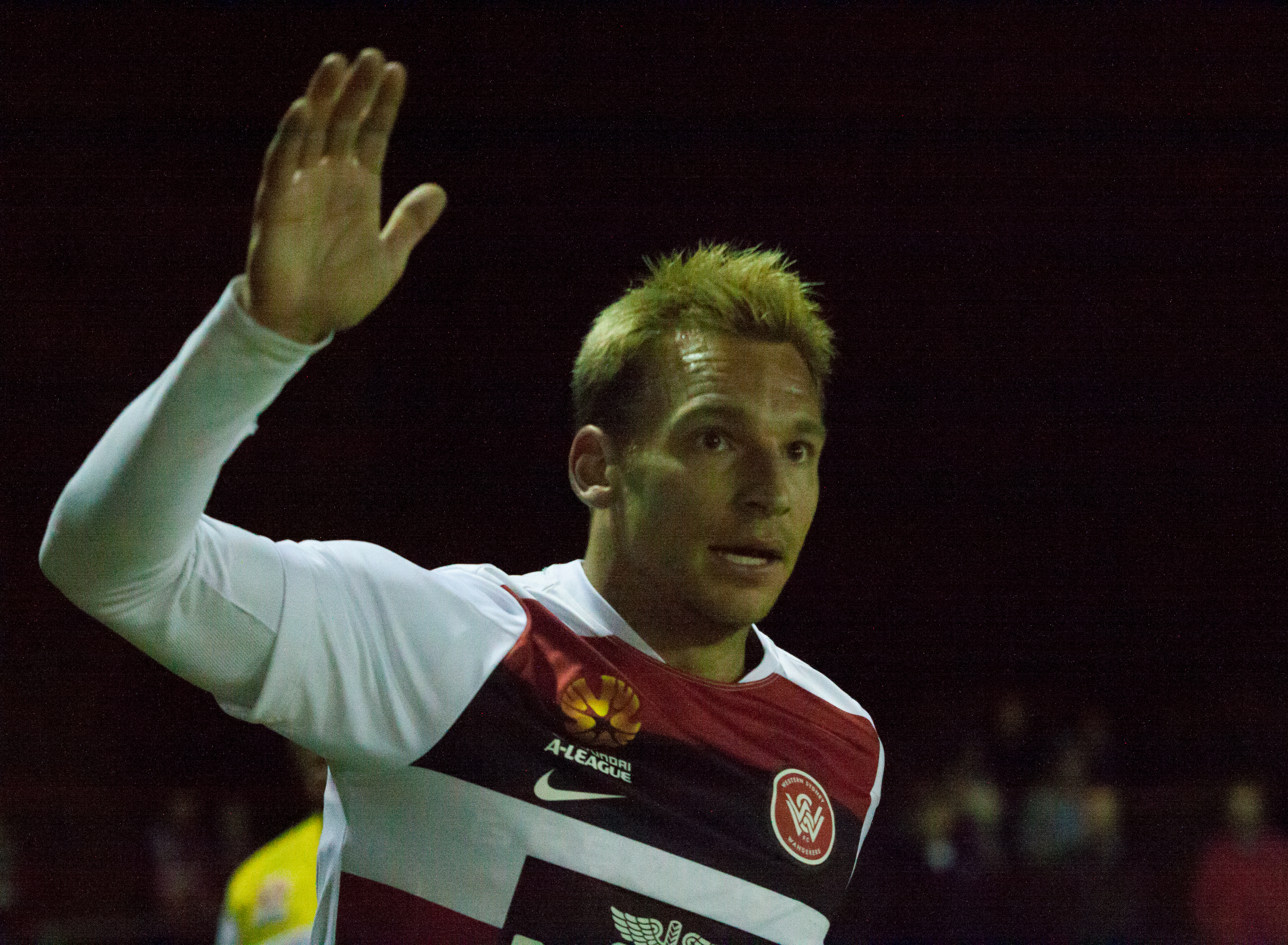
Brendon Santalab is the Western Sydney Wanderers' record goalscorer.

Western Sydney Wanderers Football Club is an Australian professional association football club based in Rooty Hill, Sydney. The club was formed and admitted into the A-League Men in 2012.

The list encompasses the honours won by Western Sydney Wanderers, records set by the club, their managers and their players. The player records section itemises the club's leading goalscorers and those who have made most appearances in first-team competitions. It also records notable achievements by Western Sydney Wanderers players on the international stage. Attendance records at Parramatta Stadium, Stadium Australia and Western Sydney Stadium are also included.

Western Sydney Wanderers have won two top-flight titles and are the only Australian team to win the AFC Champions League. The club's record appearance maker is Mark Bridge, who made 141 appearances between 2012 and 2019. Brendon Santalab is the Western Sydney Wanderers' record goalscorer, scoring 41 goals in total.

All figures are correct as of the match played on 1 December 2023.

== Honours and achievements ==
=== Domestic ===
- A-League Men Premiership

Winners (1): 2012–13
Runners-up (2): 2013–14, 2015–16

- A-League Men Championship

Runners-up (3): 2013, 2014, 2016

=== AFC ===
- AFC Champions League

Winners (1): 2014

== Player records ==
=== Appearances ===
- Most A-League Men appearances: Mark Bridge, 121
- Most Australia Cup appearances: Kearyn Baccus, 12
- Most Asian appearances: Shannon Cole, 20
- Youngest first-team player: Alusine Fofanah, 15 years, 189 days (against Adelaide United, A-League, 19 January 2014)
- Oldest first-team player: Ante Covic, 39 years, 326 days (against Guangzhou Evergrande Taobao, AFC Champions League, 5 May 2015)
- Most consecutive appearances: Mitch Nichols, 52 (from 11 August 2015 to 28 January 2017)

==== Most appearances ====
Competitive matches only, includes appearances as substitute. Numbers in brackets indicate goals scored.

#	Name	Years	A-League Men	Australia Cup	Asia	Other^{a}	Total
1	(Australia) Mark Bridge	2012–2016; 2017–2019	121 (33)	6 (1)	13 (4)	1 (0)	141 (38)
2	(Australia) Nikolai Topor-Stanley	2012–2016	104 (3)	5 (0)	15 (1)	1 (0)	125 (4)
3	(Australia) Brendon Santalab	2013–2018	97 (35)	5 (3)	12 (3)	0 (0)	114 (41)
4	(Australia) Keanu Baccus	2016–2022	106 (6)	6 (0)	1 (0)	0 (0)	113 (6)
5	(Australia) Brendan Hamill	2014–2019	80 (4)	10 (3)	12 (0)	1 (0)	103 (7)
6	Jack Clisby	2016-2018, 2023-2025	85 (3)	8 (1)	5 (0)	0 (0)	98 (4)
7	(Australia) Ante Covic	2012–2015	78 (0)	1 (0)	17 (0)	1 (0)	97 (0)
7	(Australia) Jaushua Sotirio	2013–2019	81 (11)	9 (0)	6 (2)	1 (0)	97 (13)
9	(Australia) Tate Russell	2018–2024	85 (5)	6 (1)	0 (0)	0 (0)	91 (8)
10	(Albania) Labinot Haliti	2012–2015	64 (7)	1 (0)	19 (3)	2 (0)	86 (10)

a. Includes goals and appearances (including those as a substitute) in the FIFA Club World Cup.

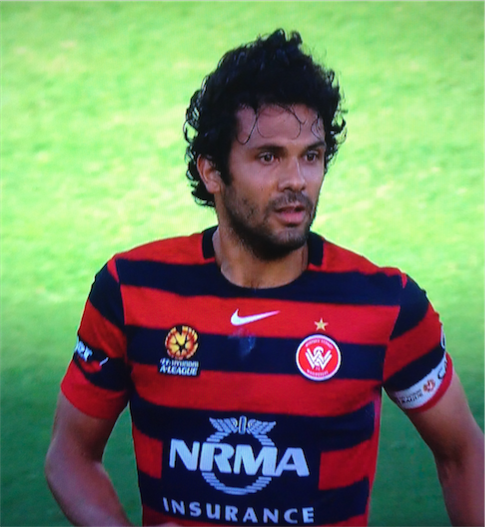
Nikolai Topor-Stanley has made the second-most appearances for the Wanderers.

=== Goalscorers ===
- Most goals in a season: Brendon Santalab, 16 goals (in the 2016–17 season)
- Most league goals in a season: Oriol Riera, 15 goals in the A-League, 2017–18)
- Youngest goalscorer: Alexander Badolato, 16 years, 260 days (against Broadmeadow Magic, FFA Cup, 10 November 2021)
- Oldest goalscorer: Miloš Ninković, 38 years, 247 days (against Adelaide United, Australian Cup, 29 August 2023)

==== Top goalscorers ====
Competitive matches only. Numbers in brackets indicate appearances made.

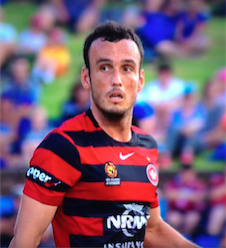
Mark Bridge is the second-highest goal scorer for the Wanderers.

#	Name	Years	A-League Men	Australia Cup	Asia	Other^{a}	Total
1	(Australia) Brendon Santalab	2013–2018	35 (97)	3 (5)	3 (12)	0 (0)	41 (114)
2	(Australia) Mark Bridge	2012–2016; 2017–2019	33 (121)	1 (6)	4 (13)	0 (1)'	38 (141)
3	(Spain) Oriol Riera	2017–2019	25 (49)	7 (8)	0 (0)	0 (0)	32 (57)
4 =	(Australia) Mitchell Duke	2019–2020; 2021	24 (54)	0 (0)	0 (0)	0 (0)	24 (54)
4 =	Nicolas Milanovic	2023- 2025	22 (63)	2 (5)	0 (0)	0 (0)	24 (68)
6	(Australia) Brandon Borrello	2022–Present	20 (68)	3 (6)	0 (0)	0 (0)	23 (74)
7	(Australia) Tomi Juric	2013–2015	12 (34)	0 (1)	5 (14)	0 (2)	17 (51)
8	(Australia) Mitch Nichols	2015–2017	11 (53)	1 (6)	1 (4)	0 (0)	13 (63)
8	(Australia) Jaushua Sotirio	2013–2019	11 (81)	0 (9)	2 (6)	0 (1)	13 (97)
10	Lachlan Brook	2023- 2024	8 (22)	5 (2)	0 (0)	0 (0)	13 (24)

a. Includes goals and appearances (including those as a substitute) in the FIFA Club World Cup.

=== International ===
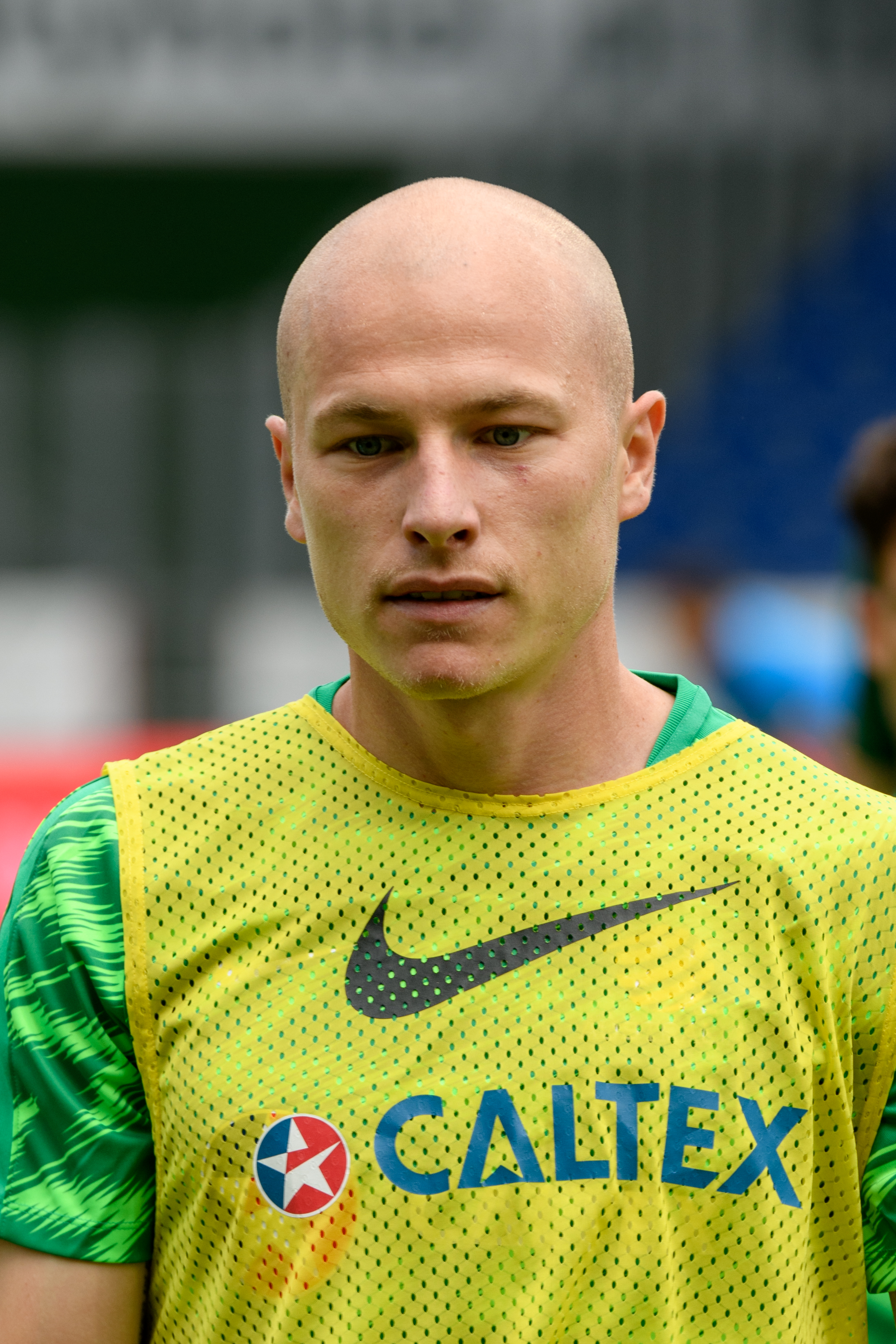
Aaron Mooy was the first Western Sydney Wanderers player to receive an international cap.

This section refers to caps won while a Western Sydney Wanderers player.

- First capped player: Aaron Mooy for Australia against Guam on 7 December 2012
- Most capped player: Tomi Juric with 13 caps.
- First player to play in the World Cup finals: Matthew Spiranovic, for Australia against Chile on 13 June 2014

== Managerial records ==
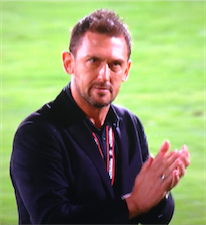
Tony Popovic was the first manager of the Wanderers.

- First full-time manager: Tony Popovic managed the Western Sydney Wanderers from May 2012 to October 2017
- Longest-serving manager: Tony Popovic — 5 years, 137 days (17 May 2012 to 1 October 2017)
- Shortest tenure as manager: Hayden Foxe — 4 weeks, 1 day (3 October 2017 to 1 November 2017)
- Highest win percentage: Tony Popovic, 42.78%
- Lowest win percentage: Hayden Foxe, 16.67%

== Club records ==
=== Matches ===
==== Firsts ====
- First match: Nepean 0–5 Western Sydney Wanderers, friendly, 25 July 2012
- First A-League Men match: Western Sydney Wanderers 0–0 Central Coast Mariners, 6 October 2012
- First Australia Cup match: Adelaide City 1–0 Western Sydney Wanderers, 12 August 2014
- First Asian match: Western Sydney Wanderers 1–3 Ulsan Hyundai, AFC Champions League group stage, 26 February 2014

==== Record wins ====
- Record A-League Men win:
  - 6–1 against Adelaide United, A-League, 21 December 2012
  - 5–0 against Western United, A-League, 8 May 2021
  - 5–0 against Western United, A-League Men, 28 October 2023
- Record Australia Cup win: 7–1 against Sydney United 58, Round of 16, 28 August 2019
- Record Asian win: 5–0 against Guizhou Renhe, AFC Champions League group stage, 22 April 2014

==== Record defeats ====
- Record A-League Mens defeat: 0–7 against Melbourne City, A-League, 12 March 2024
- Record Australia Cup defeat:
  - 1–4 against Melbourne City, Quarter-finals, 21 September 2016
  - 0–3 against Sydney FC, Semi-finals, 6 October 2018
  - 0–3 against Melbourne City, Quarter-finals, 18 September 2019
- Record Asian defeat: 1–6 against Urawa Red Diamonds, AFC Champions League group stage, 26 April 2017

==== Record consecutive results ====
- Record consecutive wins: 10, from 13 January 2013 to 16 March 2013
- Record consecutive defeats: 6, from 1 January 2019 to 22 January 2019
- Record consecutive matches without a defeat: 13, from 13 January 2013 to 12 April 2013
- Record consecutive matches without a win: 14, from 1 November 2014 to 1 February 2015.
- Record consecutive matches without conceding a goal: 4, from 12 March 2014 to 23 March 2014
- Record consecutive matches without scoring a goal: 3
  - from 6 October 2012 to 20 October 2012
  - from 26 November 2017 to 9 December 2017

=== Goals ===
- Most A-League Men goals scored in a season: 58 in 26 matches, 2024-25
- Fewest A-League Men goals scored in a season: 29 in 27 matches, 2014–15
- Most A-League Men goals conceded in a season: 54 in 27 matches, 2018–19
- Fewest A-League Men goals conceded in a season: 21 in 27 matches, 2012–13

=== Points ===
- Most points in a season: 57 in 27 matches: A-League, 2012–13
- Fewest points in a season: 18 in 27 matches: A-League, 2014–15

=== Attendances ===
This section applies to attendances at Parramatta Stadium, where Western Sydney Wanderers played their home matches from 2012 to 2016, Stadium Australia which acted as an alternative home and Western Sydney Stadium, the club's present ground are also included.

- Highest attendance at Parramatta Stadium: 20,084 against Brisbane Roar, A-League, 24 April 2016
- Lowest attendance at Parramatta Stadium: 5,221 against Kashima Antlers, AFC Champions League group stage, 21 April 2015
- Highest attendance at Stadium Australia: 61,880, against Sydney FC, A-League, 8 October 2016
- Lowest attendance at Stadium Australia: 7,062 against Melbourne Victory, A-League, 5 January 2019
- Highest attendance at Western Sydney Stadium: 28,519 against Sydney FC, A-League, 26 October 2019
- Lowest attendance at Western Sydney Stadium: 1,118 against Melbourne Victory, A-League, 12 August 2020

== See also ==
- List of Western Sydney Wanderers FC seasons
- Western Sydney Wanderers FC league record by opponent
