= Western Sydney Wanderers FC league record by opponent =

Western Sydney Wanderers FC are a professional association football club based in Rooty Hill, New South Wales. They were founded in 2012. They then became the fourth team based in NSW and the second based in Sydney to compete in the A-League.

This page shows the record between the Wanderers and their A-League opposition since they started playing in the 2012–13 A-League season.

== Key ==
- The records include the results of matches played in the A-League and finals only. No FFA Cup, AFC Champions League, FIFA Club World Cup or pre-season matches are included.
- P = matches played; W = matches won; D = matches drawn; L = matches lost; F = Goals scored; A = Goals conceded; GD = Goal difference; Win% = percentage of total matches won
- †Teams with this background and symbol in the "Club" column are competing in the 2021–22 A-League alongside Western Sydney Wanderers.

== All-time league record ==
As of 5 February 2022

Club	P	W	D	L	P	W	D	L	P	W	D	L	F	A	GD	Win%	Source
Club	Home				Away				Total							Win%	Source
Adelaide United †	12	4	5	3	15	4	5	6	27	8	10	9	43	39	+4	29.63	
Brisbane Roar †	16	6	5	5	16	5	4	7	32	11	9	13	47	45	+2	34.38	
Central Coast Mariners †	15	6	6	3	14	8	2	4	29	14	8	7	40	27	+13	48.28	
Macarthur FC †	2	0	0	2	1	0	1	0	3	0	1	2	2	5	-3	0.00	
Melbourne Heart/City †	13	7	3	3	14	4	3	6	27	11	6	9	45	43	+2	40.74	
Melbourne Victory †	13	5	1	7	12	2	3	7	25	7	4	14	25	47	-22	28.00	
Newcastle Jets †	14	3	6	5	12	6	3	3	26	9	9	8	36	38	-2	34.62	
Perth Glory †	14	8	3	3	13	2	4	7	27	10	7	10	38	38	0	37.04	
Sydney FC †	15	4	5	6	14	3	4	7	29	7	9	13	28	45	-17	24.14	
Wellington Phoenix †	13	8	1	4	15	5	4	6	28	13	5	10	48	37	+11	46.43	
Western United †	4	2	1	1	2	0	0	2	6	2	1	3	11	9	+2	33.33	
Total	130	52	36	42	127	39	33	55	257	91	69	97	362	370	-8	35.41	
