= 2012–13 Melbourne Victory FC season =

Melbourne Victory
2012–13 season
- Chairman: Anthony Di Pietro
- Manager: Ange Postecoglou
- Stadium: Etihad Stadium / AAMI Park
- A-League: 3rd
- Finals series: 3rd
- Top goalscorer: League: Marco Rojas (12); All: Marco Rojas (12)
- Highest home attendance: 42,032 vs Melbourne Heart (5 October 2012)
- Lowest home attendance: 17,128 vs Brisbane Roar (15 December 2012)
- Average home league attendance: 20,893
Home colours	Away colours

The Melbourne Victory 2012–13 season is Melbourne Victory's eighth A-League season.

== Season summary ==
At the start of the 2012–13 season Ubay Luzardo and Jean Carlos Solórzano returned to their respective clubs after their loan deals had expired.

In April 2012 Ange Postecoglou was appointed as Melbourne Victory manager. Veterans Grant Brebner and Ante Covic were released from Melbourne Victory. Fabio was then released and signed a two-year contract with archrival Sydney FC.

In May 2012, it was announced that Carlos Hernandez had exited Melbourne Victory after the club couldn't come to agree a new deal with him as they attempted to slash costs to fit him into the salary cap. On 26 May, Matthew Kemp retired from the A-League.

In June 2012 Harry Kewell quit Melbourne Victory to return to England to be with his family due to problems with his mother-in-law's health.

Several signings took place during pre-season period. Ivorian defender Adama Traoré was signed from the defunct Gold Coast United, Sam Gallagher was signed from Central Coast Mariners, Brazilian attacking midfielder Guilherme Finkler was signed from Criciúma Esporte Clube, Mauritian defensive midfield Jonathan Bru was signed from Moreirense F.C., Spase Dilevski was signed from Adelaide United, Theo Markelis was signed from Vicenza Calcio, former Johnny Warren Medal winner Marco Flores was signed from Henan Jianye and Mark Milligan was signed from JEF United Ichihara Chiba after an impressive loan spell with Melbourne Victory under former coach Jim Magilton.

In July 2012 it was announced that the club had agreed to a sponsorship deal for naming rights of the newly formed statewide Victory League based in Tasmania.

On 18 October 2012 Daniel Allsopp announced his retirement from professional football after four games from the new season. while Nathan Coe returned to Australia to sign with Melbourne Victory on a three-year deal. on 24 October 2012.

During January transfer window, Petar Franjic, Isaka Cernak & Julius Davies were released and replaced by Francesco Stella, Jesse Makarounas, Jason Geria & Scott Galloway. Former Adelaide United defender Daniel Mullen was loaned from Dalian Aerbin to replace injured Nicolas Ansell for the rest of the season.

Melbourne Victory finished the season in third place in the ladder and lost to Central Coast Mariners in final series semi-final but they are qualified for 2014 Asian Champions League if Australia is given 2.5 slots based on the 2013 AFC Champions League evaluation.

On 18 April 2013, a few days before the previous season ended, Marco Rojas quit Melbourne Victory to pursue his career in Europe after Melbourne Victory was defeated in the final series semi-final. On the following day, Tando Velaphi, Diogo Ferreira, Sam Gallagher and Spase Dilevski were released from the club.

== Players ==
=== Squad ===
As of 28 January 2013. Note: Flags indicate national team as defined under FIFA eligibility rules; some limited exceptions apply. Players may hold more than one non-FIFA nationality.

No.	Pos.	Nation	Player
1	GK	AUS	Tando Velaphi
2	DF	AUS	Matthew Foschini
3	DF	CIV	Adama Traoré
5	DF	AUS	Mark Milligan
6	MF	AUS	Leigh Broxham
7	MF	BRA	Guilherme Finkler
8	MF	MRI	Jonathan Bru
9	MF	ARG	Marcos Flores
10	FW	AUS	Archie Thompson (Vice-captain)
11	MF	NZL	Marco Rojas
13	MF	AUS	Diogo Ferreira
14	MF	AUS	Billy Celeski
15	DF	AUS	Sam Gallagher
16	FW	AUS	Theo Markelis (Youth)

No.	Pos.	Nation	Player
17	MF	AUS	James Jeggo (Youth)
18	MF	AUS	Francesco Stella
20	GK	AUS	Lawrence Thomas (Youth)
21	DF	AUS	Spase Dilevski
22	FW	AUS	Jesse Makarounas (Youth)
23	DF	AUS	Adrian Leijer (Captain)
24	DF	AUS	Nicolas Ansell (Youth)
25	FW	AUS	Luke O'Dea (Youth)
26	FW	AUS	Andrew Nabbout (Youth)
27	MF	AUS	Christopher Cristaldo (Youth)
30	DF	AUS	Jason Geria (Youth)
31	DF	AUS	Scott Galloway (Youth)
32	FW	AUS	Connor Pain (Youth)
39	GK	AUS	Nathan Coe

=== From the youth system ===
Note: Flags indicate national team as defined under FIFA eligibility rules; some limited exceptions apply. Players may hold more than one non-FIFA nationality.

No.	Pos.	Nation	Player
24	DF	AUS	Nicolas Ansell
25	FW	AUS	Luke O'Dea
26	FW	AUS	Andrew Nabbout

No.	Pos.	Nation	Player
27	MF	AUS	Christopher Cristaldo
30	DF	AUS	Jason Geria

== Transfers ==
=== Winter ===
==== In ====
Note: Flags indicate national team as defined under FIFA eligibility rules; some limited exceptions apply. Players may hold more than one non-FIFA nationality.

No.	Pos.	Nation	Player
3	DF	CIV	Adama Traoré (Free Transfer from (Australia) Gold Coast United)
5	DF	AUS	Mark Milligan (Free Transfer from (Japan) JEF United Ichihara Chiba)
7	MF	BRA	Guilherme Finkler (Free Transfer from (Brazil) Criciúma)
8	MF	MRI	Jonathan Bru (Free Transfer from (Portugal) Moreirense)
9	MF	ARG	Marcos Flores (Free Transfer from (China) Henan Jianye)
15	DF	AUS	Sam Gallagher (Free Transfer from (Australia) Central Coast Mariners)

No.	Pos.	Nation	Player
16	FW	AUS	Theo Markelis (Free Transfer from (Italy) Vicenza)
21	DF	AUS	Spase Dilevski (Free Transfer from (Australia) Adelaide United)
22	FW	AUS	Julius Davies (Free Transfer from (Germany) TSG 1899 Hoffenheim)
39	GK	AUS	Nathan Coe (Free Transfer from (Denmark) SønderjyskE)

==== Out ====
Note: Flags indicate national team as defined under FIFA eligibility rules; some limited exceptions apply. Players may hold more than one non-FIFA nationality.

No.	Pos.	Nation	Player
3	DF	BRA	Fábio (Free Transfer to (Australia) Sydney FC)
7	DF	AUS	Matthew Kemp (Free Transfer to (Australia) West Adelaide)
8	MF	SCO	Grant Brebner (Free Transfer to (Australia) Moreland Zebras)
9	FW	CRC	Jean Carlos Solórzano (Loan Return to (Costa Rica) Alajuelense)
12	DF	AUS	Rodrigo Vargas (Free Transfer to (Australia) Green Gully)
15	MF	AUS	Tom Pondeljak (Free Transfer to (Australia) St Albans Saints)

No.	Pos.	Nation	Player
16	MF	CRC	Carlos Hernández (Free Transfer to (India) Prayag United)
18	FW	AUS	Danny Allsopp (Retired)
21	GK	AUS	Ante Čović (Free Transfer to (Australia) Western Sydney Wanderers)
22	FW	AUS	Harry Kewell (Released)
28	DF	ESP	Ubay Luzardo (Loan Return to (Hong Kong) Kitchee)

=== Summer ===
==== In ====
Note: Flags indicate national team as defined under FIFA eligibility rules; some limited exceptions apply. Players may hold more than one non-FIFA nationality.

No.	Pos.	Nation	Player
18	MF	AUS	Francesco Stella (Free Transfer from (Scotland) Rangers)
22	FW	AUS	Jesse Makarounas (Free Transfer from (Australia) Perth Glory)
30	DF	AUS	Jason Geria (Free Transfer from (Australia) Brisbane Roar Youth)
31	DF	AUS	Scott Galloway (Free Transfer from (Australia) AIS)
33	DF	AUS	Daniel Mullen (Loan from (China) Dalian Aerbin)

==== Out ====
Note: Flags indicate national team as defined under FIFA eligibility rules; some limited exceptions apply. Players may hold more than one non-FIFA nationality.

No.	Pos.	Nation	Player
4	DF	AUS	Petar Franjic (Released)
19	MF	AUS	Isaka Cernak (Free Transfer to (New Zealand) Wellington Phoenix)
22	FW	AUS	Julius Davies (Free Transfer to (Australia) Brisbane Roar)

=== Post-season ===
==== Out ====
Note: Flags indicate national team as defined under FIFA eligibility rules; some limited exceptions apply. Players may hold more than one non-FIFA nationality.

No.	Pos.	Nation	Player
1	GK	AUS	Tando Velaphi (Released)
11	FW	AUS	Marco Rojas (Free transfer to (Germany) VfB Stuttgart)
13	DF	AUS	Diogo Ferreira (Released)
15	DF	AUS	Sam Gallagher (Released)
21	DF	AUS	Spase Dilevski (Released)
33	DF	AUS	Daniel Mullen (Loan return to (China) Dalian Aerbin)

== Coaching staff ==
Position	Staff
Manager	(Australia) Ange Postecoglou
Assistant manager	(Australia) Kevin Muscat
Coach	(Northern Ireland) Chris O'Loughlin
Goalkeeping Coach	(Australia) Steve Mautone
Fitness Coach	(Australia) Adam Basil
Sports Scientist	(Australia) Anita Pedrana
Physiotherapist	(Australia) Sam Bugeja
Physiotherapist	(Australia) Daniel Jones
Physiotherapist	(Australia) Sharbil Wehbe
Personal Trainer	(Australia) Andrew Brown
Club Doctor	(Australia) Dr. Anik Shawdon

== Competitions ==
=== Overall ===
Competition	Started round	Current position / round	Final position / round	First match	Last match
A-League	—	—	3rd	5 October 2012	31 March 2013
A-League final series	Elimination final	Semi-finals	3rd	5 April 2013	14 April 2013
National Youth League	—	—	Premiers	20 October 2012	3 March 2013
W-League	—	—	3rd	20 October 2012	13 January 2013
W-League final series	Semi-finals	Grand final	Runners-up	20 January 2013	27 January 2013

=== A-League ===
==== Pre-season ====
19 May 2012	Melbourne Victory (Australia)	1–4	(Greece) Olympiacos	Melbourne
	Thompson 29' (pen.)	Report	Fuster 10', 88'; Fetfatzidis 22'; Franjic 25' (o.g.)	Stadium: Etihad Stadium; Attendance: 16,879

17 July 2012	Port Melbourne Sharks (Australia)	1–2	(Australia) Melbourne Victory	Melbourne
	? (?)		Finkler 15'; Allsopp 84' (pen.)	Stadium: SS Anderson Reserve; Attendance: 1,500

24 July 2012	Oakleigh Cannons (Australia)	0–3	(Australia) Melbourne Victory	Melbourne
			Allsopp 51'; Cristaldo 80'; O'Dea 87'	Stadium: Jack Edwards Reserve; Attendance: 4,000

31 July 2012	Richmond (Australia)	4–3	(Australia) Melbourne Victory	Melbourne
	Tom Cahill 6', 44'; Milicevic 72'; Kweifio-Okai 78'	Report	Finkler 32'; Cristaldo 86'; Broxham 88'	Stadium: Kevin Bartlett Reserve; Attendance: 3,700

7 August 2012	Bentleigh Greens (Australia)	0–1	(Australia) Melbourne Victory	Melbourne
		Gallery	Foschini 43'	Stadium: Kingston Heath Soccer Complex; Attendance: 3,500

14 August 2012	Dandenong Thunder (Australia)	1–4	(Australia) Melbourne Victory	Melbourne
Monday 19:30	? 59'	Gallery	Allsopp 8' (pen.); Broxham 54'; J. Davies 77', 90'	Stadium: George Andrews Reserve; Attendance: 2,000

21 August 2012 Tasmania Trip	Tasmania XI (Australia)	0–4	(Australia) Melbourne Victory	Hobart
Monday 19:00		Report	Markelis 19'; J. Davies 30'; Milligan 79' (pen.); Allsopp 80'	Stadium: KGV Park; Attendance: 4,071; Referee: Shaun Evans

24 August 2012 Tasmania Trip	Melbourne Victory (Australia)	4–2	(Australia) Adelaide United	Launceston
Friday 19:00	Allsopp 6'; Thompson 12', 35'; Finkler 77'	Report	Vidošić 45+1' van Dijk 90+1'	Stadium: Aurora Stadium; Attendance: 3,147; Referee: Alex Azcurra

4 September 2012	Moreland Zebras (Australia)	0–3	(Australia) Melbourne Victory	Melbourne
		Report	J. Davies 5'; Markelis 28'; Flores 59' (pen.)	Stadium: Epping Stadium; Attendance: 3,500

16 September 2012	Central Coast Mariners (Australia)	1–1	(Australia) Melbourne Victory	Sydney
Sunday 15:00	Zwaanswijk 3'	Report	Thompson 61'	Stadium: Knox Grammar School; Attendance: 2,000

19 September 2012	Melbourne Victory (Australia)	1–2	(Australia) Perth Glory	Melbourne
Wednesday 14:00	Flores 37' (pen.)	Report	Ward 10'; Mehmet 34' (pen.)	Stadium: AAMI Park; Referee: Brenton Hayward

23 September 2012 Intra-club Match	Melbourne Victory (Australia)	6–0	(Australia) Melbourne Victory B	Melbourne
	Thompson 13'; Flores 23' (pen.); Traoré 28'; Rojas 33', 45', 67'	Report		Stadium: AAMI Park; Attendance: 3,000

==== Regular season ====
5 October 2012 1	Melbourne Victory	1–2	Melbourne Heart	Melbourne
Friday 19:30	Rojas 25'	Report	Williams 15'; Macallister 45+2'	Stadium: Etihad Stadium; Attendance: 42,032; Referee: Jarred Gillett

13 October 2012 2	Brisbane Roar	5–0	Melbourne Victory	Brisbane
Saturday 19:45	Broich 22'; Paartalu 24'; Berisha 64', 90'; Nichols 82'	Report		Stadium: Suncorp Stadium; Attendance: 17,364; Referee: Strebre Delovski

19 October 2012 3	Melbourne Victory	2–1	Adelaide United	Melbourne
Friday 19:30	Milligan 52'; Rojas 68'	Report	Vidošić 50' (pen.)	Stadium: Etihad Stadium; Attendance: 19,174; Referee: Peter Green

26 October 2012 4	Newcastle Jets	2–1	Melbourne Victory	Newcastle
Friday 19:30	Heskey 54', 56'	Report	Thompson 71'	Stadium: Hunter Stadium; Attendance: 13,912; Referee: Alan Milliner

5 November 2012 5	Melbourne Victory	3–2	Wellington Phoenix	Melbourne
Monday 19:30	Rojas 23', 49'; Flores 38'	Report	Brockie 81', 90+2'	Stadium: Etihad Stadium; Attendance: 20,683; Referee: Shaun Evans

10 November 2012 6	Sydney FC	2–3	Melbourne Victory	Sydney
Saturday 19:45	Yau 14'; Bosschaart 48'	Report	Nabbout 78', 90'; Thompson 86'	Stadium: Allianz Stadium; Attendance: 21,531; Referee: Kris Griffiths-Jones

17 November 2012 7	Melbourne Victory	2–2	Central Coast Mariners	Melbourne
Saturday 19:45	Nabbout 10'; Milligan 40'; Flores (yellow card) 65' (red card) 90'	Report	McBreen 4', 22'; Zwaanswijk (yellow card) 6' (red card) 51'	Stadium: Etihad Stadium; Attendance: 19,462; Referee: Strebre Delovski

24 November 2012 8	Western Sydney Wanderers	0–2	Melbourne Victory	Sydney
Saturday 19:45		Report	S. Gallagher (red card) 16'; Beauchamp 44' (o.g.); Thompson 60'	Stadium: Parramatta Stadium; Attendance: 9,614; Referee: Ben Williams

30 November 2012 9	Melbourne Victory	1–0	Perth Glory	Melbourne
Friday 19:30	Rojas 58'	Report		Stadium: AAMI Park; Attendance: 17,676; Referee: Jarred Gillett

7 December 2012 10	Adelaide United	4–2	Melbourne Victory	Adelaide
Friday 19:30	Kostopoulos 3', 32'; Ferreira 21'; Carrusca 24'	Report	Nabbout 5'; Rojas 47'	Stadium: Hindmarsh Stadium; Attendance: 14,115; Referee: Chris Beath

15 December 2012 11	Melbourne Victory	1–1	Brisbane Roar	Melbourne
Saturday 17:30	Milligan 49'	Report	Halloran 24'	Stadium: AAMI Park; Attendance: 17,128; Referee: Jarred Gillett

22 December 2012 12	Melbourne Heart	1–2	Melbourne Victory	Melbourne
Saturday 19:45	Fred 81'	Report	Rojas 61'; Thompson 90+3'	Stadium: AAMI Park; Attendance: 26,457; Referee: Alan Milliner

28 December 2012 13	Melbourne Victory	3–2	Newcastle Jets	Melbourne
Friday 19:30	Rojas 34', 74'; Thompson 45'	Report	Zadkovich 64'; Heskey 73'	Stadium: AAMI Park; Attendance: 21,054; Referee: Kris Griffiths-Jones

1 January 2013 14	Western Sydney Wanderers	2–1	Melbourne Victory	Sydney
Tuesday 18:15	Ono 42', 79'	Report	Dilevski 72'	Stadium: Parramatta Stadium; Attendance: 13,659; Referee: Lucien Laverdure

5 January 2013 15	Melbourne Victory	2–0	Wellington Phoenix	Melbourne
Saturday 19:45	Flores 42'; Rojas 52'	Report		Stadium: AAMI Park; Attendance: 18,609; Referee: Ben Williams

12 January 2013 16	Melbourne Victory	1–1	Central Coast Mariners	Launceston
Saturday 17:30	Flores 42'	Report	McBreen 77' (pen.)	Stadium: Aurora Stadium; Attendance: 6,238; Referee: Jarred Gillett

19 January 2013 17	Perth Glory	0–1	Melbourne Victory	Perth
Saturday 22:00		Report	Jamieson 25' (o.g.)	Stadium: nib Stadium; Attendance: 7,603; Referee: Regis Queffelec

26 January 2013 18	Melbourne Victory	3–1	Sydney FC	Melbourne
Saturday 17:30	Rojas 23', 73'; Thompson 68'	Report	Tiago (yellow card) 39' (red card) 60'; J. Griffiths 75'; Fábio (yellow card) 58' (red card) 90'	Stadium: AAMI Park; Attendance: 26,882; Referee: Chris Beath

2 February 2013 19	Melbourne Victory	2–1	Melbourne Heart	Melbourne
Saturday 19:45	Thompson 28'; Milligan 55' (pen.)	Report	Williams 72'	Stadium: Etihad Stadium; Attendance: 41,203; Referee: Strebre Delovski

8 February 2013 20	Adelaide United	1–0	Melbourne Victory	Adelaide
Friday 19:30	Neumann 42'	Report	Traoré (red card) 76'	Stadium: Hindmarsh Stadium; Attendance: 12,029; Referee: Jarred Gillett

16 February 2013 21	Melbourne Victory	1–2	Western Sydney Wanderers	Melbourne
Saturday 19:45	Pain 75'	Report	La Rocca 11'; Ono 72'	Stadium: AAMI Park; Attendance: 21,638; Referee: Peter Green

23 February 2013 22	Central Coast Mariners	6–2	Melbourne Victory	Gosford
Saturday 19:45	Duke 18', 32'; McGlinchey 56', 86', 90'; Fitzgerald 81'	Report	Milligan 23' (pen.); Sainsbury 69' (o.g.)	Stadium: Bluetongue Stadium; Attendance: 6,081; Referee: Strebre Delovski

3 March 2013 23	Melbourne Victory	5–0	Newcastle Jets	Melbourne
Sunday 17:00	Rojas 8', 66'; Leijer 15'; Milligan 30' (pen.), 58' (pen.)	Report	Regan (yellow card) 30' (red card) 56'	Stadium: AAMI Park; Attendance: 17,778; Referee: Jarred Gillett

9 March 2013 24	Brisbane Roar	1–1	Melbourne Victory	Brisbane
Saturday 19:45	Franjic 59'	Report	Broxham 11'	Stadium: Suncorp Stadium; Attendance: 12,624; Referee: Peter Green

16 March 2013 25	Sydney FC	1–1	Melbourne Victory	Sydney
Saturday 19:45	Yau 85'	Report	Milligan 4'	Stadium: Allianz Stadium; Attendance: 22,233; Referee: Strebre Delovski

23 March 2013 26	Melbourne Victory	2–3	Perth Glory	Melbourne
Saturday 17:30	Leijer 13'; Cristaldo 89'	Report	Harold 21'; Dodd 38'; Risdon 90+4'	Stadium: AAMI Park; Attendance: 16,839; Referee: Peter O'Leary

31 March 2013 27	Wellington Phoenix	2–3	Melbourne Victory	Wellington
Sunday 14:30	Huysegems 65'; Brockie 66'	Report	Rojas 10'; Flores 56'; Thompson 83'	Stadium: Westpac Stadium; Attendance: 6,813; Referee: Adam Kersey

==== Finals series ====
5 April 2013 Elimination Final	Melbourne Victory	2–1 (a.e.t.)	Perth Glory	Melbourne
Friday 19:30	Milligan 90' (pen.); Thompson 95'	Report	Nagai 15'; Pantelidis (yellow card) 68' (red card) 90'	Stadium: Etihad Stadium; Attendance: 22,902; Referee: Jarred Gillett

14 April 2013 Semi-final	Central Coast Mariners	1–0	Melbourne Victory	Gosford
Sunday 17:00	McBreen 42'; Montgomery (yellow card) 59' (red card) 90'	Report		Stadium: Bluetongue Stadium; Attendance: 10,651; Referee: Strebre Delovski

==== Results summary ====
Overall								Home						Away					
Pld	W	D	L	GF	GA	GD	Pts	W	D	L	GF	GA	GD	W	D	L	GF	GA	GD
27	13	5	9	48	45	+3	44	8	3	3	29	18	+11	5	2	6	19	27	−8

Last updated: 27 August 2013.

==== League table ====
Pos	Team	Pld	W	D	L	GF	GA	GD	Pts	Qualification
1	Western Sydney Wanderers	27	18	3	6	41	21	+20	57	Qualification for 2014 AFC Champions League group stage and finals series
2	Central Coast Mariners (C)	27	16	6	5	48	22	+26	54	Qualification for 2014 AFC Champions League group stage and finals series
3	Melbourne Victory	27	13	5	9	48	45	+3	44	Qualification for 2014 AFC Champions League qualifying play-off and finals series (Note: Since the winner of 2013 A-League Grand Final (Central Coast Mariners) qualified for the 2014 AFC Champions League group stage, the 3rd placed team qualified for the qualifying play-off of 2014 AFC Champions League.)
4	Adelaide United	27	12	5	10	38	37	+1	41	Qualification for Finals series
5	Brisbane Roar	27	10	5	12	33	29	+4	35	Qualification for Finals series
6	Perth Glory	27	9	5	13	29	31	−2	32	Qualification for Finals series
7	Sydney FC	27	9	5	13	41	51	−10	32	
8	Newcastle Jets	27	8	7	12	30	45	−15	31	
9	Melbourne Heart	27	8	3	16	31	40	−9	27	
10	Wellington Phoenix (Note: Wellington Phoenix cannot qualify for the AFC Champions League as they are not recognised as an AFC club.)	27	7	6	14	31	49	−18	27	

Updated to match(es) played on 30 March 2013. Source: ultimatealeague.com
Rules for classification: 1) points; 2) goal difference; 3) number of goals scored.
(C) Champions

=== National Youth League ===
==== Pre-season ====
9 October 2012	Altona Magic (Australia)	2–4	(Australia) Melbourne Victory Youth	Melbourne
	? (?) ? 41'	Report	Buceto 7', 10'; Nabbout 43' (f.k.), 70'	Stadium: Paisley Park

==== Regular season ====
20 October 2012 1	Melbourne Victory Youth	3–0	Adelaide United Youth	Melbourne
14:30	Markelis 9'; Cernak 68'; Nakic 78'	Report		Stadium: SS Anderson Reserve

28 October 2012 2	Brisbane Roar Youth	0–1	Melbourne Victory Youth	Brisbane
14:30		Report	Nakic 40'	Stadium: Goodwin Park

3 November 2012 3	AIS Football Program	1–7	Melbourne Victory Youth	Canberra
13:00	B. Appiah 45+2'	Report	J. Davies 16', 19'; Markelis 36'; Cernak 50'; O'Dea 55'; L. Jeggo 71'; Nabbout 72'	Stadium: AIS Athletics Track

11 November 2012 4	Western Sydney Wanderers Youth	2–1	Melbourne Victory Youth	Sydney
16:45	Barac 37'; Appiah-Kubi 90'	Report	Markelis 47'	Stadium: Campbelltown Stadium

18 November 2012 5	Melbourne Victory Youth	2–3	Sydney FC Youth	Melbourne
15:00	Cristaldo 9'; Pain 81'	Report	Urosevski 11'; Petratos 45'; Dotti 52'	Stadium: SS Anderson Reserve

25 November 2012 6	Perth Glory Youth	0–3	Melbourne Victory Youth	Perth
15:00		Report	Buceto 42', 50'; L. Jeggo 66'	Stadium: Intiga Stadium

1 December 2012 7	Melbourne Victory Youth	2–0	Newcastle Jets Youth	Melbourne
15:00	Cernak 38'; Foschini 52'; Markelis (yellow card) 84' (red card) 87'	Report		Stadium: SS Anderson Reserve

9 December 2012 8	Melbourne Victory Youth	5–0	AIS Football Program	Melbourne
15:00	Cristaldo 14'; Pain 19', 21'; Dilevski 52'; O'Dea 90+4'	Report		Stadium: SS Anderson Reserve

16 December 2012 9	Melbourne Victory Youth	1–6	Brisbane Roar Youth	Melbourne
15:00	J. Davies 90+1'	Report	Meyer 50'; Yeboah 53' (pen.), 57'; Dougall 71' (pen.); Proia 86'; Theodore 90'	Stadium: SS Anderson Reserve

23 December 2012 10	Melbourne Heart Youth	0–2	Melbourne Victory Youth	Melbourne
15:00		Report	O'Dea 36', 45+1'	Stadium: John Cain Memorial Park

6 January 2013 11	Newcastle Jets Youth	1–0	Melbourne Victory Youth	Newcastle
17:00	Ribeiro 18'	Report		Stadium: Wanderers Oval

13 January 2013 12	Melbourne Victory Youth	8–1	Central Coast Mariners Youth	Melbourne
15:00	J. Jeggo 1', 39'; Nabbout 3'; Buceto 9'; O'Dea 15', 30'; Pain 29'; Cristaldo 66'	Report	Duke 76'	Stadium: SS Anderson Reserve

20 January 2013 13	Sydney FC Youth	1–3	Melbourne Victory Youth	Sydney
17:00	Slater 20'	Report	Cristaldo 15'; Markelis 33'; Espindola 82'	Stadium: Cromer Park

27 January 2013 14	Melbourne Victory Youth	3–1	Melbourne Heart Youth	Melbourne
11:00	O'Dea 13'; Abbott 22' (o.g.); Makarounas 26'	Report	Groenewald (red card) 32'; Mauk 60'	Stadium: SS Anderson Reserve

3 February 2013 15	Melbourne Victory Youth	7–0	Perth Glory Youth	Melbourne
15:00	S. Gallagher 15', 55'; Nabbout 20'; Stella 77', 79', 90'; Buceto 90+4'	Report		Stadium: SS Anderson Reserve

9 February 2013 16	Adelaide United Youth	0–6	Melbourne Victory Youth	Adelaide
17:00		Report	Cristaldo 13', 39', 52'; Buceto 16'; Markelis 79', 87'	Stadium: Burton Park

17 February 2013 17	Melbourne Victory Youth	3–4	Western Sydney Wanderers Youth	Melbourne
15:00	Cristaldo 50', 87'; Murnane 89'	Report	J. Gibbs 7', 35'; N. Olsen 29'; Trifiro 65'	Stadium: SS Anderson Reserve

3 March 2013 18	Central Coast Mariners Youth	Cancelled (0–0)	Melbourne Victory Youth	Gosford
15:00		Report		Stadium: Bluetongue Stadium

==== League table ====
Pos	Team	Pld	W	D	L	GF	GA	GD	Pts
1	Melbourne Victory Youth (C)	18	12	1	5	57	20	+37	37
2	Central Coast Mariners Academy	18	12	1	5	38	28	+10	37
3	Newcastle Jets Youth	18	10	1	7	54	36	+18	31
4	Brisbane Roar Youth	18	9	3	6	39	34	+5	30
5	Perth Glory Youth	18	8	1	9	45	45	0	25
6	Melbourne Heart Youth	18	8	1	9	32	34	−2	25
7	Western Sydney Wanderers Youth	18	7	4	7	29	41	−12	25
8	Adelaide United Youth	18	6	4	8	35	42	−7	22
9	Sydney FC Youth	18	6	3	9	41	46	−5	21
10	AIS Football Program	18	2	1	15	23	58	−35	7

Source: au.soccerway.com
Rules for classification: 1) points; 2) goal difference; 3) number of goals scored.
(C) Champions

==== Results summary ====
Overall								Home						Away					
Pld	W	D	L	GF	GA	GD	Pts	W	D	L	GF	GA	GD	W	D	L	GF	GA	GD
18	12	1	5	57	20	+37	37	6	0	3	34	15	+19	6	1	2	23	5	+18

==== League Goalscorers by round ====
Total	Player		Goals per Game																	
Total	Player		1	2	3	4	5	6	7	8	9	10	11	12	13	14	15	16	17	18
9	(Australia)	Chris Cristaldo					1			1				1	1			3	2	
7	(Australia)	Luke O'Dea			1					1		2		2		1				
6	(Australia)	Theo Markelis	1		1	1									1			2		
5	(Australia)	John Buceto						2						1			1	1		
4	(Australia)	Connor Pain					1			2				1						
3	(Australia)	Isaka Cernak	1		1				1											
3	(Australia)	Julius Davies			2						1									
3	(Australia)	Andrew Nabbout			1									1			1			
3	(Australia)	Francesco Stella															3			
2	(Australia)	Jake Nakic	1	1																
2	(Australia)	Luc Jeggo			1			1												
2	(Australia)	James Jeggo												2						
2	(Australia)	Sam Gallagher															2			
1	(Australia)	Matthew Foschini							1											
1	(Australia)	Spase Dilevski								1										
1	(Australia)	Hernan Espindola													1					
1	(Australia)	Jesse Makarounas														1				
1	(Australia)	Dylan Murnane																	1	
1	–	Own goal														1				
57	Total		3	1	7	1	2	3	2	5	1	2		8	3	3	7	6	3	

=== W-League ===
==== Regular season ====
21 October 2012 1	Perth Glory	2–0	Melbourne Victory	Perth
10:30	Gill 75'; Tabain 88'	Report		Stadium: Intiga Stadium; Referee: Kirralee Gardner

27 October 2012 2	Melbourne Victory	0–1	Brisbane Roar	Melbourne
16:00		Report	V. Popovic 18' (f.k.)	Stadium: Veneto Club, Bulleen; Referee: Rebecca Durcau

3 November 2012 3	Melbourne Victory	1–0	Newcastle Jets	Geelong
14:00	Stott 45+2'	Report	Day (yellow card) 79' (red card) 82'	Stadium: Simonds Stadium; Referee: Katie Patterson

11 November 2012 4	Sydney FC	1–2	Melbourne Victory	Sydney
16:45	Kennedy 41'	Report	Catley 8'; L. Špiranović 81'	Stadium: Leichhardt Oval; Referee: Kirralee Gardner

17 November 2012 5	Melbourne Victory	3–0	Canberra United	Melbourne
15:00	Fishlock 28'; McDonald 45'; Barilla 80'	Report		Stadium: Wembley Park; Referee: Casey Reibelt

24 November 2012 6	Brisbane Roar	3–2	Melbourne Victory	Brisbane
10:00	Chapman 15', 89'; Spina 90+5'	Report	L. Špiranović 72'; McDonald 90+2'	Stadium: QSAC; Referee: Peta McCallum

1 December 2012 7	Adelaide United	0–5	Melbourne Victory	Adelaide
14:00		Report	L. Špiranović 8'; McDonald 38', 42'; Barilla 49'; Catley 90'	Stadium: Burton Park; Referee: Kelly Jones

8 December 2012 8	Melbourne Victory	1–1	Sydney FC	Melbourne
16:00	Ruyter-Hooley 27'	Report	Foord 4'	Stadium: Wembley Park; Referee: Peta McCallum

15 December 2012 9	Canberra United	1–2	Melbourne Victory	Canberra
14:00	Bisset 50'	Report	Jackson 31'; Fishlock 90+4'	Stadium: McKellar Park; Referee: Casey Reibelt

22 December 2012 10	Melbourne Victory	3–1	Western Sydney Wanderers	Melbourne
14:00	P. Larsson 9'; McDonald 52', 89'	Report	Hart 2'	Stadium: Wembley Park; Referee: Casey Reibelt

5 January 2013 11	Melbourne Victory	4–1	Adelaide United	Melbourne
16:00	Johnson 2'; P. Larsson 6'; McDonald 14'; L. Špiranović 57'	Report	McLaughlin 87'	Stadium: Wembley Park; Referee: Kiralee Gardener

13 January 2013 12	Newcastle Jets	3–3	Melbourne Victory	Newcastle
16:30	Courtenay 40' van Egmond 42', 84' (pen.)	Report	Jackson 4'; Barilla 33', 62'	Stadium: Wanderers Oval; Referee: Lara Smith

==== Finals series ====
20 January 2013 Semi-final	Perth Glory	1–1 (a.e.t.) (3–4 p)	Melbourne Victory	Perth
13:00	McCallum 56' (f.k.)	Report	L. Špiranović 51'	Stadium: nib Stadium; Attendance: 1,589; Referee: Katie Patterson
	Penalties
	McCallum (penalty scored); Gill (penalty scored); Luik (penalty missed); R. Sutton (penalty missed); De Vanna (penalty scored)		(penalty scored) Johnson; (penalty missed) Friend; (penalty scored) P. Larsson; (penalty scored) Koca; (penalty scored) McDonald

27 January 2013 Grand Final	Melbourne Victory	1–3	Sydney FC	Melbourne
15:30	P. Larsson 41' (f.k.); Ruyter-Hooley (red card) 84'	Report	Bolger 25'; Kerr 48'; Simon 85' (pen.)	Stadium: AAMI Park; Attendance: 4,181; Referee: Kate Jacewicz

==== Results summary ====
Overall								Home						Away					
Pld	W	D	L	GF	GA	GD	Pts	W	D	L	GF	GA	GD	W	D	L	GF	GA	GD
12	7	2	3	26	14	+12	23	4	1	1	12	4	+8	3	1	2	14	10	+4

==== League table ====
Pos	Team	Pld	W	D	L	GF	GA	GD	Pts	Qualification
1	Brisbane Roar	12	8	2	2	28	15	+13	26	Qualification to Finals series
2	Perth Glory	12	7	3	2	34	20	+14	24	Qualification to Finals series
3	Melbourne Victory	12	7	2	3	26	14	+12	23	Qualification to Finals series
4	Sydney FC (C)	12	6	2	4	30	24	+6	20	Qualification to Finals series
5	Canberra United	12	5	3	4	25	20	+5	18	
6	Western Sydney Wanderers	12	4	1	7	19	23	−4	13	
7	Newcastle Jets	12	1	3	8	15	33	−18	6	
8	Adelaide United	12	2	0	10	12	40	−28	6	

Source: au.soccerway.com
Rules for classification: 1) points; 2) goal difference; 3) number of goals scored.
(C) Champions

==== League goalscorers by round ====
Total	Player		Goals per Game													
Total	Player		1	2	3	4	5	6	7	8	9	10	11	12	SF	GF
7	(United States)	Jessica McDonald					1	1	2			2	1			
5	(Australia)	Laura Špiranović				1		1	1				1		1	
4	(Australia)	Enza Barilla					1		1					2		
3	(Sweden)	Petra Larsson										1	1			1
2	(Australia)	Stephanie Catley				1			1							
2	(Wales)	Jessica Fishlock					1				1					
2	(Australia)	Amy Jackson									1			1		
1	(New Zealand)	Rebekah Stott			1											
1	(Australia)	Maika Ruyter-Hooley								1						
1	(United States)	Danielle Johnson											1			

== Statistics ==
=== Squad stats ===
	A-League	Finals	Total Stats
Games played	27	2	29
Games won	13	1	14
Games drawn	5	0	5
Games lost	9	1	10
Goals scored	48	2	50
Goals conceded	45	2	47
Goal difference	+3	0	+3
Clean sheets	5	0	5
Red cards	2	0	2

Last updated: 26 August 2013

=== Player stats ===
No.	Pos.	Name	A-League		Finals		Total		Discipline	
No.	Pos.	Name	Apps	Goals	Apps	Goals	Apps	Goals	Yellow card	Red card
1	GK	(Australia) Tando Velaphi	1	0	0	0	1	0	1	0
2	DF	(Australia) Matthew Foschini	4	0	0	0	4	0	1	0
3	DF	(Ivory Coast) Adama Traoré	11	0	0	0	11	0	1	0
4	DF	(Australia) Petar Franjic	7	0	0	0	7	0	1	0
5	DF	(Australia) Mark Milligan	9	3	0	0	9	3	3	0
6	MF	(Australia) Leigh Broxham	1(7)	0	0	0	1(7)	0	2	0
7	MF	(Brazil) Guilherme Finkler	10	0	0	0	10	0	2	0
8	MF	(Mauritius) Jonathan Bru	5(6)	0	0	0	5(6)	0	2	0
9	MF	(Argentina) Marcos Flores	11	1	0	0	11	1	3	1
10	FW	(Australia) Archie Thompson	8	4	0	0	8	4	2	0
11	MF	(New Zealand) Marco Rojas	11	7	0	0	11	7	0	0
13	MF	(Australia) Diogo Ferreira	8	0	0	0	8	0	3	0
14	MF	(Australia) Billy Celeski	10(1)	0	0	0	10(1)	0	3	0
15	DF	(Australia) Sam Gallagher	2	0	0	0	2	0	1	1
16	FW	(Australia) Theo Markelis	(5)	0	0	0	(5)	0	0	0
17	MF	(Australia) James Jeggo	1(6)	0	0	0	1(6)	0	2	0
19	MF	(Australia) Isaka Cernak	1(2)	0	0	0	1(2)	0	0	0
20	GK	(Australia) Lawrence Thomas	2	0	0	0	2	0	0	0
21	MF	(Australia) Spase Dilevski	1(1)	0	0	0	1(1)	0	1	0
22	MF	(Australia) Julius Davies	0	0	0	0	0	0	0	0
23	DF	(Australia) Adrian Leijer	12	0	0	0	12	0	4	0
24	DF	(Australia) Nick Ansell	2	0	0	0	2	0	1	0
25	FW	(Australia) Luke O'Dea	0	0	0	0	0	0	0	0
26	FW	(Australia) Andrew Nabbout	5(4)	4	0	0	5(4)	4	0	0
27	MF	(Australia) Christopher Cristaldo	(1)	0	0	0	(1)	0	0	0
28	MF	(Australia) Kwabena Boahene	0	0	0	0	0	0	0	0
29	MF	(Australia) John Buceto	0	0	0	0	0	0	0	0
30	DF	(Australia) Jason Geria	0	0	0	0	0	0	0	0
31	MF	(Australia) Jake Nakic	0	0	0	0	0	0	0	0
32	GK	(Australia) Phillip Petrovski	0	0	0	0	0	0	0	0
33	MF	(Australia) Dylan Murnane	0	0	0	0	0	0	0	0
34	MF	(Australia) Luc Jeggo	0	0	0	0	0	0	0	0
35	DF	(Australia) Connor Pain	0	0	0	0	0	0	0	0
36	GK	(Australia) Luke Radonich	0	0	0	0	0	0	0	0
37	MF	(Australia) Jordan Brown	0	0	0	0	0	0	0	0
39	GK	(Australia) Nathan Coe	9	0	0	0	9	0	1	0
—	–	Own goals	–	0	–	0	–	0	–	–

== Awards ==
=== Goal of the Week ===
Week	Goal scorer
6	(Australia) Andrew Nabbout
9	(New Zealand) Marco Rojas
11	(Australia) Mark Milligan
12	(Australia) Archie Thompson
13	(New Zealand) Marco Rojas

=== Save of the Week ===
Week	Goalkeeper
9	(Australia) Nathan Coe
12	(Australia) Nathan Coe
