= 2011–12 Melbourne Victory FC season =

Melbourne Victory
2011–12 season
- Chairman: Anthony Di Pietro
- Manager: Mehmet Durakovic (until 5 January); Kevin Muscat (7 January); Jim Magilton (from 8 January)
- Stadium: AAMI Park and Etihad Stadium
- A-League Premiership: 8th
- A-League Championship: DNQ
- Top goalscorer: Carlos Hernández – 10
- Highest home attendance: 40,651 v Sydney FC; 8 October 2011
- Lowest home attendance: 14,023 v Wellington; 18 December 2011
- Average home league attendance: 24,284
Home colours	Away colours

The Melbourne Victory 2011–12 season is Melbourne Victory's seventh season in the Hyundai A-League, the highest level association football league in Australia.

== Season summary ==
On 27 May 2011, erratic Costa Rican Marvin Angulo was axed by Melbourne Victory just weeks after his loan deal appeared set to be extended, while goalkeeper Michael Petkovic announced his retirement. Thai defender Surat Sukha left to join Buriram PEA after he was released by the Victory on compassionate grounds. It was also announced on 16 June 2011 that Adidas had signed a five-year deal as the club's official kit manufacturer. On 21 June 2011, Mehmet Durakovic was appointed as head coach of Melbourne Victory while former Socceroo and SBS football analyst Francis Awaritefe was appointed as Director of Football. However, after a brief five-month stint in his job as the Director of Football with Melbourne Victory, Awaritefe was axed by Melbourne Victory, after a run of poor results.

On 20 August 2011, Melbourne Victory officially confirmed the signing of Socceroos and former Leeds, Liverpool and Galatasaray player Harry Kewell on a three-year contract.

On 15 September 2011, it was announced Brazilian Fabio Alves had signed a one-year contract with Victory, after an impressive trial performance in a pre-season friendly against reigning champions Brisbane Roar.

On 4 October 2011, Ante Covic signed a one-year deal with Melbourne Victory as an injury replacement for Tando Velaphi who was ruled out for 12 weeks.

On 5 January 2012, it was announced that manager Mehmet Durakovic had been sacked due to poor performances throughout the season, with only three wins from their first 14 games. Assistant coach, Kevin Muscat, was appointed caretaker coach while the club searched for a new coach.

On 7 January 2012, the former manager of Ipswich Town, Jim Magilton, was appointed as interim manager until the end of the current season.

On 23 January 2012 it was reported that Melbourne Victory was to secure Mark Milligan on loan until the end of the season. It was confirmed on 24 January that Milligan has signed the contract for a loan deal until the end of the 2011–12 A-League season. On 24 January 2012 it was confirmed that Julius Davies had signed with Melbourne Victory after impressing the staff during his two weeks of training with the club, although he was not cleared to play until 16 March 2012. On 8 February 2012 Hong Kong based Spanish defender Ubay Luzardo secured a loan deal to Melbourne Victory until the end of the season.

Veterans Tom Pondeljak, Rodrigo Vargas and Fabio were released days before the final series began.

On 15 March, Victory confirmed the signing of sought-after Gold Coast United defender Adama Traore on a two-year deal. On 16 March, Jim Magilton boosted his defensive stocks for the upcoming season with the capture of Central Coast Mariners utility Sam Gallagher.

Melbourne Victory finished the 2011–2012 season in eighth place and missed the finals campaign. Magilton was not offered a further contract and departed the club in April 2012.

The Melbourne Victory 2011–12 season is Melbourne Victory's seventh A-League season.

== Players ==
=== First team squad ===
As of 9 February 2012. Note: Flags indicate national team as defined under FIFA eligibility rules; some limited exceptions apply. Players may hold more than one non-FIFA nationality.

No.	Pos.	Nation	Player
1	GK	AUS	Tando Velaphi
2	DF	AUS	Matthew Foschini
3	DF	BRA	Fabio
4	DF	AUS	Petar Franjic
5	DF	AUS	Mark Milligan (Note: On loan from JEF United)
6	MF	AUS	Leigh Broxham
7	DF	AUS	Matthew Kemp
8	MF	SCO	Grant Brebner
9	FW	CRC	Jean Carlos Solórzano (Note: On loan from L.D. Alajuelense)
10	FW	AUS	Archie Thompson (Vice-captain)
11	MF	NZL	Marco Rojas
12	DF	AUS	Rodrigo Vargas
13	MF	AUS	Diogo Ferreira
14	MF	AUS	Billy Celeski
15	MF	AUS	Tom Pondeljak

No.	Pos.	Nation	Player
16	MF	CRC	Carlos Hernández
17	MF	AUS	James Jeggo
18	FW	AUS	Danny Allsopp
19	MF	AUS	Isaka Cernak
20	GK	AUS	Lawrence Thomas
21	GK	AUS	Ante Čović
22	MF	AUS	Harry Kewell
23	DF	AUS	Adrian Leijer (Captain)
25	MF	AUS	Luke O'Dea
26	DF	AUS	Nick Ansell
27	MF	AUS	Paulo Retre
28	DF	ESP	Ubay Luzardo (Note: On loan from Kitchee SC)
29	FW	AUS	Julius Davies
30	GK	AUS	Rani Dowisha

Player Notes

== Transfers ==
=== Winter ===
==== In ====
Date	Position	Name	From	Fee
20 October 2010	MF	(Australia) Isaka Cernak	(Australia) North Queensland Fury	Undisclosed
8 February 2011	GK	(Australia) Tando Velaphi	(Australia) Perth Glory	Undisclosed
11 March 2011	MF	(New Zealand) Marco Rojas	(New Zealand) Wellington Phoenix	Undisclosed
21 March 2011	MF	(Australia) James Jeggo	(Australia) Melbourne Victory Youth	3 yr Contract
28 March 2011	FW	(Costa Rica) Jean Carlos Solórzano	(Costa Rica) LD Alajuelense	1 yr Loan (May 2012)
20 August 2011	MF	(Australia) Harry Kewell	(Turkey) Galatasaray	3 yr Contract
15 September 2011	DF	(Brazil) Fabio Alves	(Brazil) Volta Redonda Futebol Clube	1 yr Contract
15 September 2011	GK	(Australia) Lawrence Thomas	(England) Sheffield United	2 yr Contract
4 October 2011	GK	(Australia) Ante Čović	(Sweden) IF Elfsborg	1 yr Contract

- Isaka Cernak and Tando Velaphi were signed during season 2010/11 after regular season and in between final series for the AFC Champions League.

==== Out ====
Date	Position	Name	To	Fee
16 February 2011	DF	(Australia) Kevin Muscat	Unattached	Retired
1 March 2011	DF	(Australia) Evan Berger	(Australia) Perth Glory	Free
1 March 2011	MF	(Australia) Mate Dugandzic	(Australia) Melbourne Heart	Free
21 March 2011	MF	(Brazil) Ricardinho	(Brazil) Paraná Clube	Loan, Undisclosed
26 March 2011	FW	(Australia) Robbie Kruse	(Germany) Fortuna Düsseldorf	Undisclosed
27 May 2011	GK	(Australia) Michael Petkovic	Unattached	Retired
27 May 2011	MF	(Costa Rica) Marvin Angulo	(Costa Rica) CS Herediano	Released
12 July 2011	DF	(Thailand) Surat Sukha	(Thailand) Buriram PEA	Free

=== Summer ===
==== In ====
Date	Position	Name	From	Fee
24 January 2012	DF	(Australia) Mark Milligan	(Japan) JEF United	End of Season Loan, undisclosed fee
8 February 2012	DF	(Spain) Ubay Luzardo	(Hong Kong) Kitchee SC	End of Season Loan, undisclosed fee

==== Out ====
Date	Position	Name	To	Fee
24 January 2012	FW	(Brazil) Ricardinho	Unattached	Released

=== Coaching staff ===
Position	Staff
First-team Manager	(Northern Ireland) Jim Magilton
First-team Assistant manager	(Australia) Kevin Muscat
First-team Coach	(Northern Ireland) Chris O'Loughlin
Youth-team Manager	(Wales) Darren Davies
Youth-team Assistant manager	(New Zealand) Vaughan Coveny
Youth-team Coach	(Australia) Dean Anastasiadis
Goalkeeping Coach	(Australia) Steve Mautone
Fitness Coach	(Australia) Adam Basil
Sports Scientist	(Australia) Anita Pedrana
Physiotherapist	(Australia) Sam Bugeja
Physiotherapist	(Australia) Daniel Jones
Physiotherapist	(Australia) Sharbil Wehbe
Personal Trainer	(Australia) Andrew Brown
Club Doctor	(Australia) Dr. Anik Shawdon

== Matches ==
=== 2011–2012 Pre-season friendlies ===
Date	Opponents	H / A	Result F – A	Scorers	Attendance
13 July 2011	Celtic	H	0 – 1		20,794
26 July 2011	Port Melbourne	A	2 – 0	Allsopp 15', Broxham 35'	
3 August 2011	Dandenong Thunder	N	0 – 1		
10 August 2011	Bentleigh Greens	N	2 – 3	Hernández (2)	
24 August 2011	Springvale White Eagles	A	5 – 1	Thompson (2), Solórzano, Hernández, Allsopp	
4 September 2011	Gold Coast United	N	0 – 1		
11 September 2011	Brisbane Roar	N	2 – 0	Hernández 39', Allsopp 50'	6,307
23 September 2011	Adelaide United	A	1 – 1	Hernández 87'	9,543

=== 2011–2012 Hyundai A-League fixtures ===
8 October 2011 Round 1	Melbourne Victory	0 : 0	Sydney FC	Etihad Stadium, Melbourne Docklands
		Summary		Attendance: 40,651; Referee:

14 October 2011 Round 2	Adelaide United	1 : 0	Melbourne Victory	Hindmarsh Stadium, Adelaide
	S. van Dijk 52'	Summary		Attendance: 14,573

22 October 2011 Round 3	Melbourne Victory	0 : 0	Melbourne Heart	Etihad Stadium, Melbourne Docklands
		Summary		Attendance: 39,309

30 October 2011 Round 4	Wellington Phoenix	1 : 2	Melbourne Victory	Westpac Stadium, Wellington
16:30 NZDT; 14:30 AEDT	Ben Sigmund (yellow card) 54' (red card) 66'; D. Sánchez (yellow card) 60' (goal) 71'	(0:1); Report	42' A. Thompson; (yellow card) 53' T. Pondeljak; 67' (pen.) C. Hernández; (yellow card) 82' Fabio	Attendance: 9,369; Referee: (Australia) Peter Green

5 November 2011 Round 5	Melbourne Victory	2 : 2	Brisbane Roar	Etihad Stadium, Melbourne Docklands
	A. Čović (red card) 2'; C. Hernández (yellow card) 7'; A. Thompson 9', 20' (yellow card) 90'; A. Leijer (yellow card) 25'; M. Foschini (red card) 36'; D. Allsopp (yellow card) 78'	Summary	5' (pen.) Henrique; 27' T. Broich; (yellow card) 69' B. Berisha; (yellow card) 89' L. Brattan	Attendance: 24,820; Referee: (Australia) Ben Williams

12 November 2011 Round 6	Central Coast Mariners	0 : 0	Melbourne Victory	Bluetongue Stadium
7:45pm AEDT (UTC+11)	P. Bojić (yellow card) 11'; R. Griffiths (yellow card) 61'	Report	(yellow card) 44' A. Thompson; (yellow card) 52' M. Kemp	Attendance: 10,251

20 November 2011 Round 7	Melbourne Victory	2 : 2	Perth Glory	Etihad Stadium, Melbourne Docklands
	C. Hernández 67' (pen.); D. Allsopp 57'	Summary	(red card) 36' L. Miller; 70' Andrezinho; 87' S. Smeltz	Attendance: 18,404

27 November 2011 Round 8	Melbourne Victory	3 : 2	Gold Coast United	AAMI Park, Melbourne
5:00pm AEDT (UTC+11)	Kewell 9' (pen.); Hernandez 23', 79' (red card) 34' Vargas		McAllister 45+4' (pen.); Junschlager 47'	Attendance: 16,522

3 December 2011 Round 9	Newcastle Jets	3 : 1	Melbourne Victory	Ausgrid Stadium, New Lambton
7:45 PM AEDT (UTC+11)	Griffiths 27' (pen.), 88'; Haliti 47'	Report	Hernández 20'	Attendance: 17,245

10 December 2011 Round 10	Melbourne Victory	1 : 1	Adelaide United	Etihad Stadium, Melbourne Docklands
7:45pm AEDT (UTC+11)	Thompson 59'	Report	Barbiero 82'	Attendance: 16,562

18 December 2011 Round 11	Melbourne Victory	3 : 1	Wellington Phoenix	AAMI Park, Melbourne
17:00 AEDT; 19:00 NZDT Melbourne Starting XI: 21 (Australia) GK Ante Čović; 02 (Australia) DF Matthew Foschini; 03 (Brazil) DF Fabio; 04 (Australia) DF Petar Franjic; 06 (Australia) MF Leigh Broxham; 10 (Australia) FW Archie Thompson (substituted off) 76'; 13 (Australia) MF Diogo Ferreira; 14 (Australia) MF Billy Celeski; 16 (Costa Rica) MF Carlos Hernández (substituted off) 72'; 22 (Australia) FW Harry Kewell (substituted off) 82'; 23 (Australia) DF Adrian Leijer (c); Substitutes: 20 (Australia) GK Lawrence Thomas; 11 (New Zealand) MF Marco Rojas (substituted on) 76'; 18 (Australia) FW Danny Allsopp (substituted on) 72'; 19 (Australia) MF Isaka Cernak (substituted on) 82'	A. Thompson 3'; H. Kewell (yellow card) 15'; B. Celeski (yellow card) 19' (yellow-red card) 79'; V. Lia 22' (o.g.); D. Ferreira 24'; L. Broxham (yellow card) 28'	Summary; Report; 13 Shots 18; 6 Shots on Target 5; 10 Fouls Committed 9; 3 Corners 9; 1 Offsides 2; 54% Possession 46%	84' A. Smith	Attendance: 14,023; Referee: (Australia) Matthew Gillett Wellington Starting XI: 20 (Trinidad and Tobago) GK Tony Warner; 02 (Malta) MF Manny Muscat; 04 (Australia) DF Brent Griffiths (substituted off) 63'; 06 (New Zealand) MF Tim Brown; 07 (New Zealand) MF Leo Bertos; 09 (England) FW Chris Greenacre (substituted off) 63'; 12 (Australia) MF Nick Ward (substituted off) 66'; 17 (Australia) MF Vince Lia; 18 (New Zealand) DF Ben Sigmund; 22 (Australia) DF Andrew Durante (c); 24 (United States) FW Alex Smith; Substitutes: 01 (New Zealand) GK Mark Paston; 11 (New Zealand) MF Daniel (substituted on) 63'; 14 (Australia) FW Mirjan Pavlovic (substituted on) 63'; 21 (Spain) MF Dani Sánchez (substituted on) 66'

23 December 2011 Round 12	Melbourne Heart	3 : 2	Melbourne Victory	AAMI Park, Melbourne
20:00 AEDT Melbourne Heart XI: 01 (Australia) GK Clint Bolton; 02 (Australia) DF Michael Marrone; 03 (Australia) DF Brendan Hamill; 16 (Australia) DF Aziz Behich; 25 (Australia) DF Adrian Madaschi; 05 (Brazil) MF Fred (c); 06 (Australia) MF Matt Thompson (substituted off) 78'; 10 (Australia) MF Wayne Srhoj; 07 (Netherlands) FW Rutger Worm (substituted off) 71'; 19 (Australia) FW Eli Babalj (substituted off) 59'; 23 (Australia) FW Mate Dugandžić; Substitutes: 11 (Brazil) FW Alex Terra (substituted on) 59'; 17 (Australia) FW Jason Hoffman (substituted on) 71'; 18 (Australia) DF Curtis Good (substituted on) 78'; 30 (Australia) GK Sebastian Mattei	Thompson 37', 39'; Terra 62'	Summary; Report; 55% Possession 45% 54% Territory 46% 18 Shots 15; 8 Shots On Target 5; 5 Shots Off Target 5; 6 Corners 6; 2 Offsides 297; 6 Completed Passes 315; 22 Total Crosses 15; 3 Saves 4; 12 Clearances 16; 25 Tackles 23; 15 Fouls 14; 4 Yellow Cards 1; 0 Red Cards 0	Thompson 21'; Hernández 90+2'	Attendance: 26,579; Referee: (Australia) Strebre Delovski Melbourne Victory XI: 21 (Australia) GK Ante Čović; 02 (Australia) DF Matthew Foschini; 03 (Brazil) DF Fabio (substituted off) 72'; 04 (Australia) DF Petar Franjic; 23 (Australia) DF Adrian Leijer (c); 06 (Australia) MF Leigh Broxham; 13 (Australia) MF Diogo Ferreira; 16 (Costa Rica) MF Carlos Hernández; 19 (Australia) MF Isaka Cernak (substituted off) 55'; 10 (Australia) FW Archie Thompson; 22 (Australia) FW Harry Kewell; Substitutes: 08 (Scotland) MF Grant Brebner; 11 (New Zealand) MF Marco Rojas (substituted on) 55'; 18 (Australia) FW Danny Allsopp (substituted off) 72'; 20 (Australia) GK Lawrence Thomas (substituted on) 66'

31 December 2011 Round 13	Brisbane Roar	3 : 1	Melbourne Victory	Suncorp Stadium
9:30	Sayed Adnan (yellow card) 33'; Nichols 44'; Visconte 50'; Franjic 53'	Summary	Kewell 3'; Vargas (yellow card) 20'; Celeski (yellow card) 45'; Allsopp (yellow card) 78'	Attendance: 14,852; Referee: Jarred Gillett

4 January 2012 Round 14	Central Coast Mariners	2 : 0	Melbourne Victory	Bluetongue Stadium
08:45	Simon 1', 84'; Sainsbury (yellow card) 53'	Summary		Attendance: 12,284; Referee: Peter Green

7 January 2012 Round 15	Melbourne Victory	2 : 1	Newcastle Jets	AAMI Park, Melbourne
08:45	Allsopp 6'; Franjic (yellow card) 12'; Sung-Hwan Byun 74' (o.g.); Allsopp (yellow card) 81'; Broxham (yellow card) 90'	Summary	Kantarovski (yellow card) 36'; Elrich (red card) 53'; Griffiths 85'; Simic (yellow card) 90'	Attendance: 14,897; Referee: Ryan Shepheard

13 January 2012 Round 16	Melbourne Victory	1 : 1	Adelaide United	AAMI Park, Melbourne
09:00	Thompson 6'; Brebner (yellow card) 43'; Fabinho (yellow card) 82'	Summary	van Dijk 53'; Boogaard (yellow card) 65'	Attendance: 20,959; Referee: Jarred Gillett

22 January 2012 Round 17	Perth Glory	4 : 1	Melbourne Victory	nib Stadium, Perth
08:30	Smeltz 14', 35' (pen.); Sterjovski 42' (pen.); Smeltz (yellow card) 84'; Andrezinho 90'	Summary	Kewell (yellow card) 16'; Leijer (yellow card) 34'; Kewell 69' (pen.); Cernak (yellow card) 71'; Allsopp (red card) 78'	Attendance: 12,358; Referee: Peter Green

26 January 2012 Round 18	Melbourne Victory	2 : 2	Sydney FC	AAMI Park, Melbourne
05:00	Cernak 45'; Fabinho 45+2'; Ferreira (yellow card) 59'	Summary	Bosschaart (yellow card) 45+1'; Bruno Cazarine 56'; Ryall 89'	Attendance: 20,053; Referee: Strebre Delovski

1 February 2012 Round 19	Gold Coast United	1 : 1	Melbourne Victory	Aurora Stadium, Launceston
07:30	Thwaite 90'	Summary	Kewell 66'	Attendance: 5,268

4 February 2012 Round 20	Melbourne Heart	0 : 0	Melbourne Victory	AAMI Park, Melbourne

10 February 2012 Round 21	Melbourne Victory	2 : 1	Central Coast Mariners	AAMI Park, Melbourne

18 February 2012 Round 22	Brisbane Roar	3 : 2	Melbourne Victory	Suncorp Stadium, Brisbane

25 February 2012 Round 23	Gold Coast United	1 : 1	Melbourne Victory	Skilled Park, Gold Coast

3 March 2012 Round 24	Melbourne Victory	1 : 3	Newcastle Jets	AAMI Park, Melbourne

10 March 2012 Round 25	Sydney FC	1 : 0	Melbourne Victory	Allianz Stadium, Sydney

16 March 2012 Round 26	Melbourne Victory	3 : 0	Wellington Phoenix	AAMI Park, Melbourne

24 March 2012 Round 27	Perth Glory	4 : 2	Melbourne Victory	nib Stadium, Perth

=== Exhibition Match ===
6 December 2011 Friendly	Melbourne Victory	2 : 2 (3–4 p)	Los Angeles Galaxy	Etihad Stadium, Melbourne Docklands
7:30 PM	Hernández 15', Cernak 37'	Report	Keane 40' pen, 49' pen	Attendance: 34,608; Referee: Strebre Delovski

=== Results summary ===
Overall								Home						Away					
Pld	W	D	L	GF	GA	GD	Pts	W	D	L	GF	GA	GD	W	D	L	GF	GA	GD
14	3	6	5	17	21	−4	15	2	5	0	11	8	+3	1	1	5	6	13	−7

=== Results by round ===
Round	1	2	3	4	5	6	7	8	9	10	11	12	13	14	15	16	17	18	19	20	21	22	23	24	25	26	27
Ground	H	A	H	A	H	A	H	H	A	H	H	A	A	A	H	H	A	H	A	A	H	A	A	H	A	H	A
Result	D	L	D	W	D	D	D	W	L	D	W	L	L	L	W	D	L	D	D	D	W	L	D	L	L	W	L
Position	5	8	7	4	6	6	6	3	7	8	5	6	6	8	7	8	8	8	8	8	8	8	8	8	8	8	8

A = Away; H = Home; W = Win; D = Draw; L = Loss

== Statistics ==
=== Appearances ===
No.	Pos.	Name	League		Finals		Total		Discipline	
No.	Pos.	Name	Apps	Goals	Apps	Goals	Apps	Goals	Yellow card	Red card
1	GK	(Australia) Tando Velaphi	0	0	0	0	0	0	0	0
2	DF	(Australia) Matthew Foschini	5	0	0	0	5	0	2	1
3	DF	(Brazil) Fabio	7	0	0	0	7	0	3	0
4	DF	(Australia) Petar Franjic	2	0	0	0	2	0	0	0
6	MF	(Australia) Leigh Broxham	7	0	0	0	7	0	0	0
7	DF	(Australia) Matthew Kemp	2	0	0	0	2	0	1	0
8	MF	(Scotland) Grant Brebner	3	0	0	0	3	0	0	0
9	FW	(Costa Rica) Jean Carlos Solórzano	5	0	0	0	5	0	0	0
10	FW	(Australia) Archie Thompson	7	3	0	0	7	6	1	0
11	MF	(New Zealand) Marco Rojas	7	0	0	0	7	0	0	0
12	DF	(Australia) Rodrigo Vargas	7	0	0	0	7	0	0	0
13	MF	(Australia) Diogo Ferreira	2	0	0	0	2	0	0	0
14	MF	(Australia) Billy Celeski	5	0	0	0	5	0	1	0
15	MF	(Australia) Tom Pondeljak	4	0	0	0	4	0	1	0
16	MF	(Costa Rica) Carlos Hernández	5	2	0	0	5	6	1	0
17	MF	(Australia) James Jeggo	2	0	0	0	2	0	0	0
18	FW	(Australia) Danny Allsopp	5	1	0	0	5	1	1	0
19	MF	(Australia) Isaka Cernak	3	0	0	0	3	0	0	0
20	GK	(Australia) Lawrence Thomas	2	0	0	0	2	0	0	0
21	GK	(Australia) Ante Čović	6	0	0	0	6	0	0	1
22	FW	(Australia) Harry Kewell	5	0	0	0	5	0	1	0
23	DF	(Australia) Adrian Leijer	6	0	0	0	6	0	3	1
25	FW	(Australia) Luke O'Dea	0	0	0	0	0	0	0	0
26	DF	(Australia) Nicholas Ansell	0	0	0	0	0	0	0	0
30	GK	(Australia) Rani Dowisha	0	0	0	0	0	0	0	0
–	–	Own goals	–	0	–	0	–	0	–	–

=== Ladder ===
Pos	Team	Pld	W	D	L	GF	GA	GD	Pts	Qualification
1	Central Coast Mariners	27	15	6	6	40	24	+16	51	Qualification for 2013 AFC Champions League group stage and finals series (Note: First place qualifies for the 2013 AFC Champions League group stage. Winning the 2012 A-League Grand Final automatically earns qualification for the 2013 AFC Champions League qualifying play-off, unless first place are champions.)
2	Brisbane Roar (C)	27	14	7	6	50	28	+22	49	Qualification for 2013 AFC Champions League qualifying play-off and finals series
3	Perth Glory	27	13	4	10	40	35	+5	43	Qualification for Finals series
4	Wellington Phoenix	27	12	4	11	34	32	+2	40	Qualification for Finals series
5	Sydney FC	27	10	8	9	37	42	−5	38	Qualification for Finals series
6	Melbourne Heart	27	9	10	8	35	34	+1	37	Qualification for Finals series
7	Newcastle Jets	27	10	5	12	38	41	−3	35	
8	Melbourne Victory	27	6	11	10	35	43	−8	29	
9	Adelaide United	27	5	10	12	26	44	−18	25	
10	Gold Coast United	27	4	9	14	30	42	−12	21	

Source: ultimatealeague.com
Rules for classification: 1) points; 2) goal difference; 3) number of goals scored.
(C) Champions
