= 2012–13 National Youth League (Australia) =

A-League National Youth League
- Season: 2012–13
- Premiers: Melbourne Victory Youth (1st title)
- Matches: 90
- Goals: 388 (4.31 per match)
- Top goalscorer: Kale Bradbery (16)
- Biggest home win: Newcastle Jets Youth 7 – 0 AIS Football Program (17 November 2012); Melbourne Victory Youth 8 – 1 Central Coast Mariners Youth (13 January 2013); Melbourne Victory Youth 7 – 0 Perth Glory Youth (3 February 2013)
- Biggest away win: AIS Football Program 0 – 8 Sydney FC Youth (21 November 2012)
- Highest scoring: Newcastle Jets Youth 4 – 6 Perth Glory Youth (13 January 2013)
- Longest winning run: Central Coast Mariners Youth (7)
- Longest unbeaten run: Central Coast Mariners Youth (7)
- Longest winless run: AIS Football Program (10)
- Longest losing run: AIS Football Program (8)

The 2012–13 A-League National Youth League was the fifth season of the Australian A-League National Youth League competition. The season ran in parallel with the 2012–13 A-League season. The new Western Sydney Wanderers played their inaugural season in the league, replacing the defunct Gold Coast United team.

== Teams ==
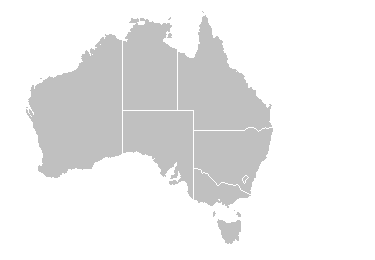

Team	Home city	Home ground
Adelaide United Youth	Adelaide	Burton Park
AIS Football Program	Canberra	Australian Institute of Sport
Brisbane Roar Youth	Brisbane	Goodwin Park
Central Coast Mariners Youth	Gosford	Central Coast Mariners Centre of Excellence
Melbourne Heart Youth	Melbourne	John Cain Memorial Park
Melbourne Victory Youth	Melbourne	SS Anderson Reserve
Newcastle Jets Youth	Newcastle	Wanderers Oval
Perth Glory Youth	Perth	Intiga Stadium
Sydney FC Youth	Sydney	Leichhardt Oval
Western Sydney Wanderers Youth	Sydney	Campbelltown Stadium

=== Managerial changes ===
Team	Outgoing manager	Manner of departure	Date of vacancy	Replaced by	Date of appointment	Table
Western Sydney Wanderers Youth	Inaugural		4 April 2012	Trevor Morgan	27 June 2012	Pre-season
Melbourne Heart Youth	John Aloisi	Moved to senior role	8 May 2012	Joe Palatsides	8 August 2012	Pre-season
Sydney FC Youth	Ian Crook	Moved to senior role	14 May 2012	Brian Dene	17 July 2012	Pre-season
Newcastle Jets Youth	Arthur Papas	Resigned	24 May 2012	Clayton Zane	8 June 2012	Pre-season
Central Coast Mariners Youth	Tony Walmsley	Resigned	21 September 2012	John McLafferty	10 October 2012	Pre-season

== Standings ==
Pos	Team	Pld	W	D	L	GF	GA	GD	Pts
1	Melbourne Victory Youth (C)	18	12	1	5	57	20	+37	37
2	Central Coast Mariners Academy	18	12	1	5	38	28	+10	37
3	Newcastle Jets Youth	18	10	1	7	54	36	+18	31
4	Brisbane Roar Youth	18	9	3	6	39	34	+5	30
5	Perth Glory Youth	18	8	1	9	45	45	0	25
6	Melbourne Heart Youth	18	8	1	9	32	34	−2	25
7	Western Sydney Wanderers Youth	18	7	4	7	29	41	−12	25
8	Adelaide United Youth	18	6	4	8	35	42	−7	22
9	Sydney FC Youth	18	6	3	9	41	46	−5	21
10	AIS Football Program	18	2	1	15	23	58	−35	7

Source: au.soccerway.com
Rules for classification: 1) points; 2) goal difference; 3) number of goals scored.
(C) Champions

== Fixture and results ==
Round 1

20 October 2012	Perth Glory Youth	1–2	Brisbane Roar Youth	Intiga Stadium, Perth
13:00 AWST	Donachie 10' (o.g.)	Report	Lambadaridis 72'; Do 83'

20 October 2012	Melbourne Victory Youth	3–0	Adelaide United Youth	SS Anderson Reserve, Melbourne
14:30 AEDT	Markelis 9'; Cernak 60'; Nakic 75'	Report

21 October 2012	Central Coast Mariners Youth	2–1	Newcastle Jets Youth	Central Coast Mariners Centre of Excellence, Tuggerah
10:30 AEDT	Cirjak 17'; Kwasnik 23'	Report	Oxborrow 47'

21 October 2012	Western Sydney Wanderers Youth	0–2	Melbourne Heart Youth	Cook Park, Sydney
15:00 AEDT		Report	Batsis 45'; Groenewald 60'

21 November 2012 (rescheduled)	AIS Football Program	0–8	Sydney FC Youth	Australian Institute of Sport, Canberra
17:00 AEDT		Report	Triantis 21', 68'; Urosevski 36', 37', 63'; Taneski 48'; Naumoff 75'; Lum 84'

Round 2

25 October 2012	Newcastle Jets Youth	2–2	Western Sydney Wanderers Youth	Wanderers Oval, Newcastle
18:30 AEDT	Ilic 44'; Bradbery 82'	Report	Caira 19', 33'

27 October 2012	Melbourne Heart Youth	1–2	Central Coast Mariners Youth	John Cain Memorial Park, Melbourne
15:00 AEDT	Andrijasevic 5'	Report	Duke 15'; Bragg 31'

28 October 2012	Adelaide United Youth	5–1	AIS Football Program	Burton Park, Adelaide
11:00 ACDT	Kostopoulos 14', 27'; Tshongo 28' (o.g.); Briscoe 30'; Karatzas 75'	Report	Barresi 8'

28 October 2012	Sydney FC Youth	2–4	Perth Glory Youth	ANZ Stadium, Sydney
14:15 AEDT	Urosevski 17'; Triantis 51'	Report	Zahra 21'; O'Neill 27'; Davies 36'; O'Brien 79'

28 October 2012	Brisbane Roar Youth	0–1	Melbourne Victory Youth	Goodwin Park, Brisbane
14:30 AEST		Report	Nakic 40'

Round 3

3 November 2012	AIS Football Program	1–7	Melbourne Victory Youth	Australian Institute of Sport, Canberra
13:00 AEDT	Appiah 45+2'	Report	Davies 16', 19'; Markelis 36'; Cernak 50'; O'Dea 55'; J. Jeggo 71'; Nabbout 72'

3 November 2012	Melbourne Heart Youth	2–1	Brisbane Roar Youth	John Cain Memorial Park, Melbourne
15:00 AEDT	Z. Walker 1'; Cartanos 90+3'	Report	Do 22'

3 November 2012	Western Sydney Wanderers Youth	2–2	Adelaide United Youth	Campbelltown Stadium, Sydney
16:45 AEDT	Z. Elrich 68'; McGing 76'	Report	Kostopoulos 19', 36'

4 November 2012	Central Coast Mariners Youth	4–2	Sydney FC Youth	Central Coast Mariners Centre of Excellence, Tuggerah
10:30 AEDT	O. Bozanic 3'; Kwasnik 25', 56'; Calver 45' (o.g.)	Report	Triantis 26', 72' (pen.)

4 November 2012	Perth Glory Youth	2–3	Newcastle Jets Youth	Intiga Stadium, Perth
15:00 AWST	Nagai 30'; Makarounas 90+3'	Report	Bradbery 10' (pen.), 88'; Pavicevic 90'

Round 4

10 November 2012	Brisbane Roar Youth	4–2	AIS Football Program	Goodwin Park, Brisbane
13:00 AEST	Liftin 20'; Do 26'; Proia 45'; Dougall 51' (pen.)	Report	Gersbach 23'; Gallaway 35' (pen.)

10 November 2012	Melbourne Heart Youth	1–4	Perth Glory Youth	John Cain Memorial Park, Melbourne
15:00 AEDT	Groenewald 33'	Report	Makeche 17', 90+2' (pen.); O'Brien 74'; Zahra 90'

10 November 2012	Adelaide United Youth	1–2	Central Coast Mariners Youth	Burton Park, Adelaide
16:30 ACDT	Mabil 74'	Report	Bragg 33'; Peterson 48'

11 November 2012	Sydney FC Youth	1–3	Newcastle Jets Youth	Leichhardt Oval, Sydney
14:00 AEDT	Calver 80'	Report	Bridges 3', 47'; Ribeiro 75'

11 November 2012	Western Sydney Wanderers Youth	2–1	Melbourne Victory Youth	Campbelltown Stadium, Sydney
16:45 AEDT	Barac 37'; Appiah-Kubi 90'	Report	Markelis 46'

Round 5

17 November 2012	Newcastle Jets Youth	7–0	AIS Football Program	Wanderers Oval, Newcastle
10:30 AEDT	Hoole 17'; Jesic 20', 23', 33'; Bradbery 25', 50' (pen.), 78'	Report

17 November 2012	Perth Glory Youth	0–1	Central Coast Mariners Youth	Intiga Stadium, Perth
10:30 AWST		Report	Dixon 48'

17 November 2012	Adelaide United Youth	1–1	Melbourne Heart Youth	Hindmarsh Stadium, Adelaide
14:15 ACDT	Mabil 74'	Report	Cartanos 67'

18 November 2012	Melbourne Victory Youth	2–3	Sydney FC Youth	SS Anderson Reserve, Melbourne
15:00 AEDT	Cristaldo 9'; Pain 81'	Report	Urosevski 11'; Petratos 45'; Dotti 52'

18 November 2012	Brisbane Roar Youth	2–2	Western Sydney Wanderers Youth	Goodwin Park, Brisbane
15:00 AEST	Meyer 16'; Yeboah 22'	Report	Appiah-Kubi 44'; Haliti 45'

Round 6

24 November 2012	Sydney FC Youth	0–3	Adelaide United Youth	Leichhardt Stadium, Sydney
14:00 AEDT		Report	Mabil 18'; Caravella 39'; Briscoe 62'

24 November 2012	Central Coast Mariners Youth	3 – 0*	Brisbane Roar Youth	Central Coast Mariners Centre of Excellence, Tuggerah
15:00 AEDT		Report	Meyer 83'

- Brisbane fielded ineligible players, CCM retrospectively awarded a 3–0 win. Original result was 0–1

25 November 2012	Melbourne Heart Youth	3–0	Newcastle Jets Youth	John Cain Memorial Park, Melbourne
15:00 AEDT	Retre 6'; Batsis 22'; Z. Walker 80'	Report

25 November 2012	Perth Glory Youth	0–3	Melbourne Victory Youth	Intiga Stadium, Perth
15:00 AWST		Report	Buceto 42', 50'; L. Jeggo 66'

25 November 2012	Western Sydney Wanderers Youth	2–1	AIS Football Program	Campbelltown Stadium, Sydney
16:45 AEDT	Appiah-Kubi 78'; Barac 90+1'	Report	Barresi 26'

Round 7

1 December 2012	Sydney FC Youth	1–5	Melbourne Heart Youth	Leichhardt Oval, Sydney
12:45 AEDT	Urosevski 68'	Report	Epifano 15'; Batsis 35', 83'; Retre 72'; Mauk 90+2'

1 December 2012	Melbourne Victory Youth	2–0	Newcastle Jets Youth	SS Anderson Reserve, Melbourne
15:00 AEDT	Cernak 38'; Foschini 52'	Report

2 December 2012	Central Coast Mariners Youth	3–0	Western Sydney Wanderers Youth	Central Coast Mariners Centre of Excellence, Tuggerah
10:30 AEDT	Kwasnik 23'; Pellegrino 30'; Dixon 86'	Report

2 December 2012	AIS Football Program	1–2	Perth Glory Youth	Australian Institute of Sport, Canberra
11:00 AEDT	Gersbach 25'	Report	Makeche 6'; Kalau 29'

2 December 2012	Brisbane Roar Youth	3–1	Adelaide United Youth	Goodwin Park, Brisbane
16:00 AEST	Proia 14', 45'; Fitzgerald 59'	Report	Mabil 24'

Round 8

8 December 2012	Adelaide United Youth	6–2	Perth Glory Youth	Burton Park, Adelaide
11:00 ACDT	Mabil 8' van Dijk 20', 55'; Wooding 35'; Melling 45'; Briscoe 85'	Report	Makeche 1', 70'

8 December 2012	Western Sydney Wanderers Youth	0–3	Sydney FC Youth	Campbelltown Stadium, Sydney
16:45 AEDT		Report	Petkovski 15'; Urosevski 26', 70'

8 December 2012	Newcastle Jets Youth	4–3	Central Coast Mariners Youth	Hunter Stadium, Newcastle
17:00 AEDT	Grossman 9'; Hoole 20'; Bradbery 31', 40'	Report	Dixon 35'; Neill 51'; Cirjak 86'

9 December 2012	Brisbane Roar Youth	2–3	Melbourne Heart Youth	Goodwin Park, Brisbane
14:30 AEST	Fitzgerald 55'; Proia 90+4'	Report	Gray 13'; Groenewald 19', 26'

9 December 2012	Melbourne Victory Youth	5–0	AIS Football Program	SS Anderson Reserve, Melbourne
15:00 AEDT	Cristaldo 14'; Pain 19', 21'; Dilevski 52'; O'Dea 90+4'	Report

Round 9

15 December 2012	Adelaide United Youth	3–2	Newcastle Jets Youth	Burton Park, Adelaide
10:30 ACDT	Mabil 27', 30', 40'	Report	Jesic 10' (pen.); Bradbery 15'

15 December 2012	Perth Glory Youth	5–1	Western Sydney Wanderers Youth	Intiga Stadium, Perth
10:30 AWST	Nagai 4'; Makarounas 43'; Makeche 45+4'; O'Neill 46'; Kalau 74'	Report	Barac 78'

15 December 2012	Central Coast Mariners Youth	0–3	Melbourne Heart Youth	Central Coast Mariners Centre of Excellence, Tuggerah
14:00 AEDT		Report	Mauk 42'; Groenewald 60', 78'

16 December 2012	Melbourne Victory Youth	1–6	Brisbane Roar Youth	SS Anderson Reserve, Melbourne
15:00 AEDT	Davies 90+1'	Report	Meyer 50'; Yeboah 53' (pen.), 57'; Dougall 71' (pen.); Proia 86'; Theodore 90'

16 December 2012	Sydney FC Youth	2–2	AIS Football Program	Cromer Park, Sydney
15:00 AEDT	Urosevski 51'; Naumoff 74'	Report	Norris 45'; Galloway 62'

Round 10

22 December 2012	AIS Football Program	1–3	Central Coast Mariners Youth	Australian Institute of Sport, Canberra
15:00 AEDT	Barresi 23'	Report	L. Bozanic 33'; Bragg 78'; Dixon 90+3'

22 December 2012	Adelaide United Youth	1–1	Western Sydney Wanderers Youth	Burton Park, Adelaide
15:00 ACDT	Briscoe 57'	Report	Perkatis 46'

23 December 2012	Newcastle Jets Youth	4–1	Sydney FC Youth	Wanderers Oval, Newcastle
10:30 AEDT	Bradbery 16', 84'; Taggart 41', 45+2'	Report	Urosevski 87'

23 December 2012	Melbourne Heart Youth	0–2	Melbourne Victory Youth	John Cain Memorial Park, Melbourne
15:00 AEDT		Report	O'Dea 36', 45+1'

23 December 2012	Brisbane Roar Youth	2–2	Perth Glory Youth	Goodwin Park, Brisbane
15:00 AEST	Proia 2'; Liftin 48'	Report	O'Neill 22'; Lowry 35'

Round 11

5 January 2013	Western Sydney Wanderers Youth	0–5	Central Coast Mariners Youth	Cook Park, Sydney
15:00 AEDT		Report	Bragg 12'; Cáceres 34'; McDonald 47'; Duke 70', 78'

5 January 2013	Brisbane Roar Youth	3–1	Sydney FC Youth	Goodwin Park, Brisbane
16:00 AEST	Theodore 53'; Yeboah 64'; Liftin 65'	Report	Mallia 37'

6 January 2013	Perth Glory Youth	1–2	AIS Football Program	Intiga Stadium, Perth
11:00 AWST	Higgins 70'	Report	Schmidt 81'; Barresi 82'

6 January 2013	Newcastle Jets Youth	1–0	Melbourne Victory Youth	Wanderers Oval, Newcastle
17:00 AEDT	Ribeiro 18'	Report

7 January 2013	Melbourne Heart Youth	0–1	Adelaide United Youth	Epping Stadium, Melbourne
10:00 AEDT		Report	Wooding 81' (pen.)

Round 12

12 January 2013	Sydney FC Youth	4–1	Western Sydney Wanderers Youth	Cromer Park, Sydney
10:00 AEDT	Mallia 8', 80'; Lum 24' (pen.); Antonis 87'	Report	Z. Elrich 48'

13 January 2013	Newcastle Jets Youth	4–6	Perth Glory Youth	Wanderers Oval, Newcastle
10:30 AEDT	Ribeiro 13'; Jesic 32', 35', 88' (pen.)	Report	Harold 10' (pen.); Glisby 50'; Sam 61'; Woodcock 68'; Zahra 78'; Kalau 80'	Referee: Stephan Luca

13 January 2013	AIS Football Program	1–3	Melbourne Heart Youth	Australian Institute of Sport, Canberra
13:00 AEDT	Rose 73'	Report	Garuccio 37'; Groenewald 70'; Epifano 75'

13 January 2013	Melbourne Victory Youth	8–1	Central Coast Mariners Youth	SS Anderson Reserve, Melbourne
15:00 AEDT	J. Jeggo 1', 39'; Nabbout 3'; Buceto 9'; O'Dea 15', 30'; Pain 29'; Cristaldo 66'	Report	Duke 76'

13 January 2013	Adelaide United Youth	3–0	Brisbane Roar Youth	Para Hills SC, Adelaide
17:00 ACDT	van Dijk 30', 31'; Melling 84'	Report

Round 13

19 January 2013	Brisbane Roar Youth	3–2	Newcastle Jets Youth	Goodwin Park, Brisbane
10:15 AEST	Theodore 19'; Schiavo 39'; Franze 77'	Report	Russell 35'; Jesic 89'

19 January 2013	Melbourne Heart Youth	1–2	Western Sydney Wanderers Youth	Epping Stadium, Melbourne
15:00 AEDT	Macallister 18' (pen.)	Report	Perkatis 10' (pen.); Barac 42'

20 January 2013	Central Coast Mariners Youth	2–1	AIS Football Program	Glen Willow Regional Sports Stadium, Mudgee
15:00 AEDT	Bragg 17'; L. Bozanic 46'	Report	Marino 43'

20 January 2013	Sydney FC Youth	1–3	Melbourne Victory Youth	Cromer Park, Sydney
17:00 AEDT	Slater 20'	Report	Cristaldo 15'; Markelis 33'; Espindola 82'

20 January 2013	Perth Glory Youth	5–2	Adelaide United Youth	Intiga Stadium, Perth
17:00 AWST	Harold 12'; Nagai 48'; Woodcock 51'; Sam 84'; Makeche 90'	Report	Melling 66'; Kirk 82'

Round 14

26 January 2013	Central Coast Mariners Youth	2–1	Adelaide United Youth	Central Coast Mariners Centre of Excellence, Tuggerah
10:30 AEDT	Dixon 24'; McDonald 30'	Report	Briscoe 55'

26 January 2013	AIS Football Program	2–5	Newcastle Jets Youth	Australian Institute of Sport, Canberra
15:00 AEDT	Marino 37'; Barresi 90+2'	Report	Jesic 2', 73'; Lundy 46', 57', 85'

27 January 2013	Melbourne Victory Youth	3–1	Melbourne Heart Youth	SS Anderson Reserve, Melbourne
11:00 AEDT	O'Dea 13'; Abbott 22' (o.g.); Makarounas 26'	Report	Mauk 60'

27 January 2013	Western Sydney Wanderers Youth	4–0	Brisbane Roar Youth	Cook Park, Sydney
16:30 AEDT	Trifiro 3'; Perkatis 34'; Cindric 61'; Visconte 75'	Report

27 January 2013	Perth Glory Youth	3–4	Sydney FC Youth	Intiga Stadium, Perth
17:00 AWST	O'Brien 27'; Makeche 34'; O'Neill 78'	Report	Gligor 16'; Petkovski 37', 63'; Taneski 54'

Round 15

2 February 2013	AIS Football Program	1–4	Western Sydney Wanderers Youth	Australian Institute of Sport, Canberra
14:00 AEDT	Kalik 63'	Report	Gibbs 1'; Caira 10'; Pizatta 59' (o.g.); McGing 76'

2 February 2013	Brisbane Roar Youth	2–0	Central Coast Mariners Youth	Goodwin Park, Brisbane
15:00 AEST	Davies 8'; Dougall 33' (pen.)	Report

2 February 2013	Adelaide United Youth	3–3	Sydney FC Youth	Burton Park, Adelaide
17:00 ACDT	Karatzas 1', 54'; Briscoe 42'	Report	Urosevski 65', 71'; Lum 87' (pen.)

3 February 2013	Melbourne Victory Youth	7–0	Perth Glory Youth	SS Anderson Reserve, Melbourne
15:00 AEDT	Gallagher 15', 55'; Nabbout 20'; Stella 77', 79', 90'; Buceto 90+4'	Report

3 February 2013	Newcastle Jets Youth	5–2	Melbourne Heart Youth	Wanderers Oval, Newcastle
17:00 AEDT	Ribeiro 5'; Taggart 34', 53', 78'; Caravella 44'	Report	Z. Walker 58', 70'

Round 16

9 February 2013	Central Coast Mariners Youth	1–3	Perth Glory Youth	Central Coast Mariners Centre of Excellence, Tuggerah
10:30 AEDT	McDonald 70'	Report	Vulin 5'; Zahra 54'; Makeche 84'

9 February 2013	Adelaide United Youth	0–6	Melbourne Victory Youth	Burton Park, Adelaide
17:00 ACDT		Report	Cristaldo 13', 39', 52'; Buceto 16'; Markelis 79', 87'

10 February 2013	Sydney FC Youth	2–2	Brisbane Roar Youth	Allianz Stadium, Sydney
14:15 AEDT	Slater 83'; Mallia 89'	Report	Do 60'; Yeboah 90'

10 February 2013	Melbourne Heart Youth	3–2	AIS Football Program	Epping Stadium, Melbourne
15:00 AEDT	Garuccio 5'; Batsis 23'; Groenewald 48'	Report	Marino 56' (pen.); Kuzmanovski 80'

10 February 2013	Western Sydney Wanderers Youth	0–4	Newcastle Jets Youth	Cook Park, Sydney
17:30 AEDT		Report	Jesic 3', 13', 80'; Bradbery 48'

Round 17

16 February 2013	AIS Football Program	3–4	Brisbane Roar Youth	Australian Institute of Sport, Canberra
14:00 AEDT	Marino 26', 29'; Smith 39'	Report	Theodore 58'; Liftin 71'; Thurtell 80', 85'

17 February 2013	Sydney FC Youth	0–4	Central Coast Mariners Youth	Cromer Park, Sydney
15:00 AEDT		Report	Jenner 30', 81'; Dixon 41'; Paull 70'

17 February 2013	Melbourne Victory Youth	3–4	Western Sydney Wanderers Youth	SS Anderson Reserve, Melbourne
15:00 AEDT	Cristaldo 50', 87'; Murnane 89'	Report	Gibbs 7' (pen.), 35'; Olsen 29'; Trifiro 65'

17 February 2013	Newcastle Jets Youth	6–1	Adelaide United Youth	Wanderers Oval, Newcastle
17:00 AEDT	Lundy 36'; Bradbery 55', 73', 90'; Hoole 64'; Pavicevic 86'	Report	Briscoe 8'

17 February 2013	Perth Glory Youth	4–1	Melbourne Heart Youth	Intiga Stadium, Perth
17:00 AWST	Córdoba 28'; Zahra 50'; Sam 78'; Vulin 82'	Report	Mullett 89'

Round 18

23 February 2013	AIS Football Program	3–1	Adelaide United Youth	Australian Institute of Sport, Canberra
11:00 AEDT	Marino 56'; Pudler 75'; Antoniou 87'	Report	Konstandopoulos 81'

23 February 2013	Melbourne Heart Youth	0–3	Sydney FC Youth	Epping Stadium, Melbourne
15:00 AEDT		Report	Kofinas 15'; Mallia 33'; Stevanja 90+2' (o.g.)

23 February 2013	Newcastle Jets Youth	1–3	Brisbane Roar Youth	Wanderers Oval, Newcastle
17:00 AEDT	Bradbery 23'	Report	Meyer 1', 32', 67'

24 February 2013	Western Sydney Wanderers Youth	2–1	Perth Glory Youth	Cook Park, Sydney
10:00 AEDT	Haliti 42'; McGing 90+3'	Report	Vulin 81'

3 March 2013	Central Coast Mariners Youth	Cancelled (0–0)	Melbourne Victory Youth	Central Coast Mariners Centre of Excellence, Tuggerah
15:00 AEDT		Report

== Top goalscorers ==
Updated to end of round 17

Total	Player		Club	Goals per Week																	
Total	Player		Club	1	2	3	4	5	6	7	8	9	10	11	12	13	14	15	16	17	18
16	(Australia)	Kale Bradbery	Newcastle Jets		1	2		3			2	1	2						1	3	1
13	(Australia)	Marko Jesic	Newcastle Jets					3				1			3	1	2		3		
12	(Australia)	Alec Urosevski	Sydney FC	3	1			1		1	2	1	1					2			
9	(Australia)	Christopher Cristaldo	Melbourne Victory					1			1				1	1			3	2	
8	(Australia)	Awer Mabil	Adelaide United				1	1	1	1	1	3									
8	(Australia)	Ndumba Makeche	Perth Glory				2			1	1	1				1	1		1		
8	(Australia)	Joshua Groenewald	Melbourne Heart	1			1				2	2			1				1		
7	(Australia)	Luke O'Dea	Melbourne Victory			1					1		2		2		1				
7	(Australia)	Thomas Briscoe	Adelaide United		1				1		1		1				1	1		1	
6	(Australia)	Anthony Proia	Brisbane Roar				1			2	1	1	1								
6	(Australia)	Theo Markelis	Melbourne Victory	1		1	1									1			2		
6	(Australia)	Patrick Dixon	Central Coast Mariners					1		1	1		1				1			1	
6	(Australia)	Marc Marino	AIS Football Program													1	1		1	2	1
6	(Australia)	James Meyer	Brisbane Roar					1	1			1									3

Goal scored from penalty kick Two goals scored from penalty kick
