= Ante Covic =

Australian soccer player (born 1975)

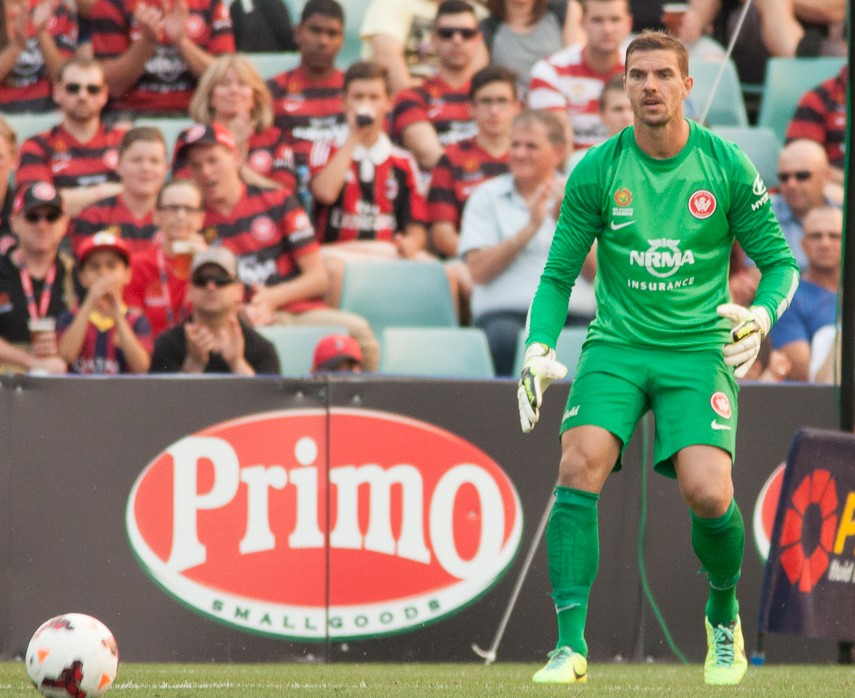
- Covic as goalkeeper for the Western Sydney Wanderers in 2013

Personal information
- Full name: Ante Covic
- Date of birth: 13 June 1975 (age 51)
- Place of birth: Sydney, Australia
- Height: 1.93 m (6 ft 4 in)
- Position: Goalkeeper

Youth career
- 1995: Hurstville Zagreb

Senior career*
| Years | Team | Apps | (Gls) |
| 1996–1997 | APIA Leichhardt Tigers | 23 | (0) |
| 1997–1999 | Marconi Stallions | 46 | (0) |
| 1999–2001 | PAOK | 8 | (0) |
| 2000 | → Kavala (loan) | 15 | (0) |
| 2001–2002 | Dinamo Zagreb | 0 | (0) |
| 2002–2007 | Hammarby IF | 121 | (0) |
| 2007–2009 | Newcastle Jets | 54 | (0) |
| 2009–2011 | IF Elfsborg | 59 | (0) |
| 2011–2012 | Melbourne Victory | 24 | (0) |
| 2012–2015 | Western Sydney Wanderers | 78 | (0) |
| 2015–2016 | Perth Glory | 28 | (0) |
| 2017–2018 | Rockdale City Suns | 49 | (0) |
| 2018 | Wellington Phoenix | 0 | (0) |
| Total | | 505 | (0) |

International career
| 2006–2008 | Australia | 2 | (0) |

Managerial career
- 2018–2023: Marconi Stallions (goalkeeping coach)
- 2024–: Bankstown City (Women)
- * Club domestic league appearances and goals

Ante Covic (born 13 June 1975) is an Australian soccer manager and former player who is the manager of Bankstown City (Women) in NSW League One. A goalkeeper, Covic was a member of the Australian national team at the 2006 FIFA World Cup in Germany and represented Australia on two occasions. In 2014 he was named Player of the Tournament for the 2014 AFC Champions League, keeping 8 clean sheets in 12 matches with the Western Sydney Wanderers as they defeated Al-Hilal in the final.

== Personal life ==
Covic is of Croatian heritage. He is married to Vanessa Covic and has two children, Emelie and Christopher.

== Club career ==
Covic formerly played for Marconi Stallions and Sydney Olympic in Australia's National Soccer League, PAOK and Kavala in Greece and Dinamo Zagreb in Croatia.

=== Hammarby IF ===
After Australia in 1999, Covic made numerous appearances for various European clubs before arriving in Hammarby IF, a Swedish club based in Stockholm. There he battled Erland Hellström for the spot as first keeper. About a month into the Swedish Allsvenskan series, Covic made his debut between the posts (however, not his debut game with Hammarby as he made an appearance roughly three weeks earlier in a cup game) and after that he was more or less given in the starting eleven.

Covic left Hammarby in 2006 after having played 121 games – a feat that has only been surpassed by three other goalkeepers in the club's history.

=== Newcastle Jets ===
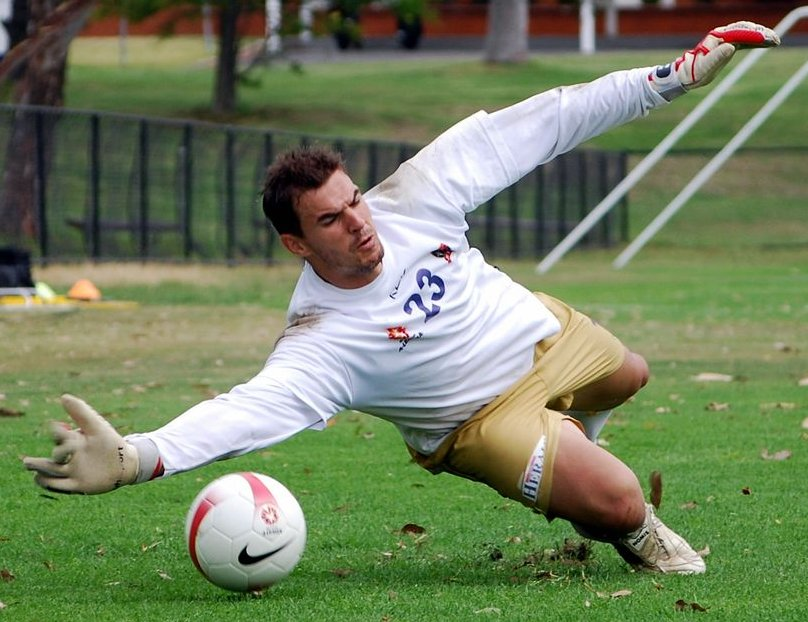
Covic training with Newcastle Jets in 2008

Covic made his A-League debut in a 3–2 loss to Adelaide United in December 2006 at Hindmarsh Stadium. Čović was the starting goalkeeper for Newcastle Jets in the 2007 season, in which he won the A-League championship. On 17 March 2009, it was announced that Covic was leaving the Jets for a three-year deal with Swedish club IF Elfsborg.

=== Melbourne Victory ===
On 4 October 2011, Covic signed a one-year deal with Melbourne Victory as an injury replacement for Tando Velaphi, who was ruled out for 12 weeks. Čović debuted in the opening game of the A-League season against Sydney FC at the Etihad Stadium. Covic achieved instant hero status with the home fans when he saved Emerton from the penalty spot in the 33rd minute, he was named man of the match in the 0–0 draw. He was again named man of the match after the Melbourne Derby two weeks later.

In the A-League fifth round match between Brisbane Roar and Melbourne Victory in 2011, Covic, along with fellow Victory defender Matthew Foschini, were controversially sent off by referee Ben Williams for challenges against Roar defenders, reducing the Victory to playing with nine men throughout the match.

On 1 May 2012, it was announced new Melbourne Victory coach Ange Postecoglou would not resign the veteran goalkeeper, opting to stay with younger goalkeepers Lawrence Thomas and Tando Velaphi. This decision followed Covic winning the Player's Player of the Year award at the Melbourne Victory Awards Dinner.

=== Western Sydney Wanderers ===
On 2 July 2012, Covic joined A-League expansion club Western Sydney Wanderers on a free transfer. The Wanderers performed above expectations and won the Premier's Plate in their maiden season, with Čović being named in the inaugural A-League All-Star team. He helped his side to win 2014 AFC Champions League, keeping 8 clean sheets in 12 matches. The Wanderers defeated Al-Hilal in the final, after which he was named as MVP of the tournament.

=== Perth Glory ===
On 8 July 2015, Covic joined Perth Glory.

=== Rockdale City and retirement ===
In June 2016, at the end of his contract, Covic decided to leave Perth Glory to return east to be closer to his family, and joined Rockdale City Suns in January 2017. He retired from football at the end of the 2018 NPL season in November 2018, after two seasons at the club, to take a position as goalkeeper coach for Marconi Stallions. In December, he joined Wellington Phoenix as short-term injury cover following an injury to first-choice goalkeeper Filip Kurto. He remained on the bench for the duration of the side's 3–1 win over Sydney FC.

== International career ==
He was part of the Australian squad for the 2006 World Cup play-offs against Uruguay and was Australia's third choice goalkeeper behind Mark Schwarzer and Zeljko Kalac for the finals in Germany.

He made his debut for Australia against Bahrain on 22 February 2006 in an Asian Cup qualifier. On 22 March 2008 he earned his second and last cap against Singapore in an international friendly and was captain for part of the second half after Harry Kewell and Jade North left the field.

== Career statistics ==
=== Club ===
As of 15 May 2015

Appearances and goals by club, season and competition
| Club | Season | League (Note: includes A-League final series.) | | | Cup | | Continental (Note: AFC Champions League statistics are included in season ending during group stages (i.e. ACL 2014 and A-League season 2013–14 etc.)) | | Total | |
| Club | Season | Division | Apps | Goals | Apps | Goals | Apps | Goals | Apps | Goals |
|---|---|---|---|---|---|---|---|---|---|---|
| Marconi Stallions | 1997–98 | National Soccer League | 25 | 0 | 0 | 0 | 0 | 0 | 25 | 0 |
| Marconi Stallions | 1998–99 | National Soccer League | 21 | 0 | 0 | 0 | 0 | 0 | 21 | 0 |
| Marconi Stallions | Total | | 46 | 0 | 0 | 0 | 0 | 0 | 46 | 0 |
| PAOK | 1999–2000 | Alpha Ethniki | 4 | 0 | 2 | 0 | 3 | 0 | 9 | 0 |
| PAOK | 2000–01 | Alpha Ethniki | 4 | 0 | 1 | 0 | 0 | 0 | 4 | 0 |
| PAOK | Total | | 8 | 0 | 3 | 0 | 3 | 0 | 13 | 0 |
| Kavala (loan) | 1999–2000 | Alpha Ethniki | 15 | 0 | 0 | 0 | 0 | 0 | 15 | 0 |
| Dinamo Zagreb | 2001–02 | Prva HNL | 0 | 0 | 0 | 0 | 0 | 0 | 0 | 0 |
| Hammarby IF | 2002 | Allsvenskan | 20 | 0 | 0 | 0 | 2 | 0 | 22 | 0 |
| Hammarby IF | 2003 | Allsvenskan | 26 | 0 | 0 | 0 | 0 | 0 | 26 | 0 |
| Hammarby IF | 2004 | Allsvenskan | 26 | 0 | 0 | 0 | 4 | 0 | 30 | 0 |
| Hammarby IF | 2005 | Allsvenskan | 26 | 0 | 0 | 0 | 0 | 0 | 26 | 0 |
| Hammarby IF | 2006 | Allsvenskan | 23 | 0 | 0 | 0 | 0 | 0 | 23 | 0 |
| Hammarby IF | Total | | 121 | 0 | 0 | 0 | 6 | 0 | 127 | 0 |
| Newcastle Jets | 2006–07 | A-League | 8 | 0 | 0 | 0 | 0 | 0 | 8 | 0 |
| Newcastle Jets | 2007–08 | A-League | 25 | 0 | 5 | 0 | 0 | 0 | 30 | 0 |
| Newcastle Jets | 2008–09 | A-League | 21 | 0 | 3 | 0 | 2 | 0 | 26 | 0 |
| Newcastle Jets | Total | | 54 | 0 | 8 | 0 | 2 | 0 | 64 | 0 |
| IF Elfsborg | 2009 | Allsvenskan | 29 | 0 | 2 | 0 | 6 | 0 | 37 | 0 |
| IF Elfsborg | 2010 | Allsvenskan | 17 | 0 | 0 | 0 | 4 | 0 | 21 | 0 |
| IF Elfsborg | 2011 | Allsvenskan | 13 | 0 | 2 | 0 | 3 | 0 | 18 | 0 |
| IF Elfsborg | Total | | 59 | 0 | 4 | 0 | 13 | 0 | 76 | 0 |
| Melbourne Victory | 2011–12 | A-League | 24 | 0 | 0 | 0 | 0 | 0 | 24 | 0 |
| Western Sydney Wanderers | 2012–13 | A-League | 29 | 0 | – | | – | | 29 | 0 |
| Western Sydney Wanderers | 2013–14 | A-League | 28 | 0 | – | | 12 | 0 | 40 | 0 |
| Western Sydney Wanderers | 2014–15 | A-League | 21 | 0 | 1 | 0 | 6 | 0 | 28 | 0 |
| Western Sydney Wanderers | Total | | 78 | 0 | 1 | 0 | 18 | 0 | 97 | 0 |
| Career total | | | 405 | 0 | 13 | 0 | 42 | 0 | 460 | 0 |

=== International ===
Appearances and goals by national team and year
| National team | Year | Apps | Goals |
|---|---|---|---|
| Australia | 2006 | 1 | 0 |
| Australia | 2007 | 0 | 0 |
| Australia | 2008 | 1 | 1 |
| Total | | 2 | 1 |

== Honours ==
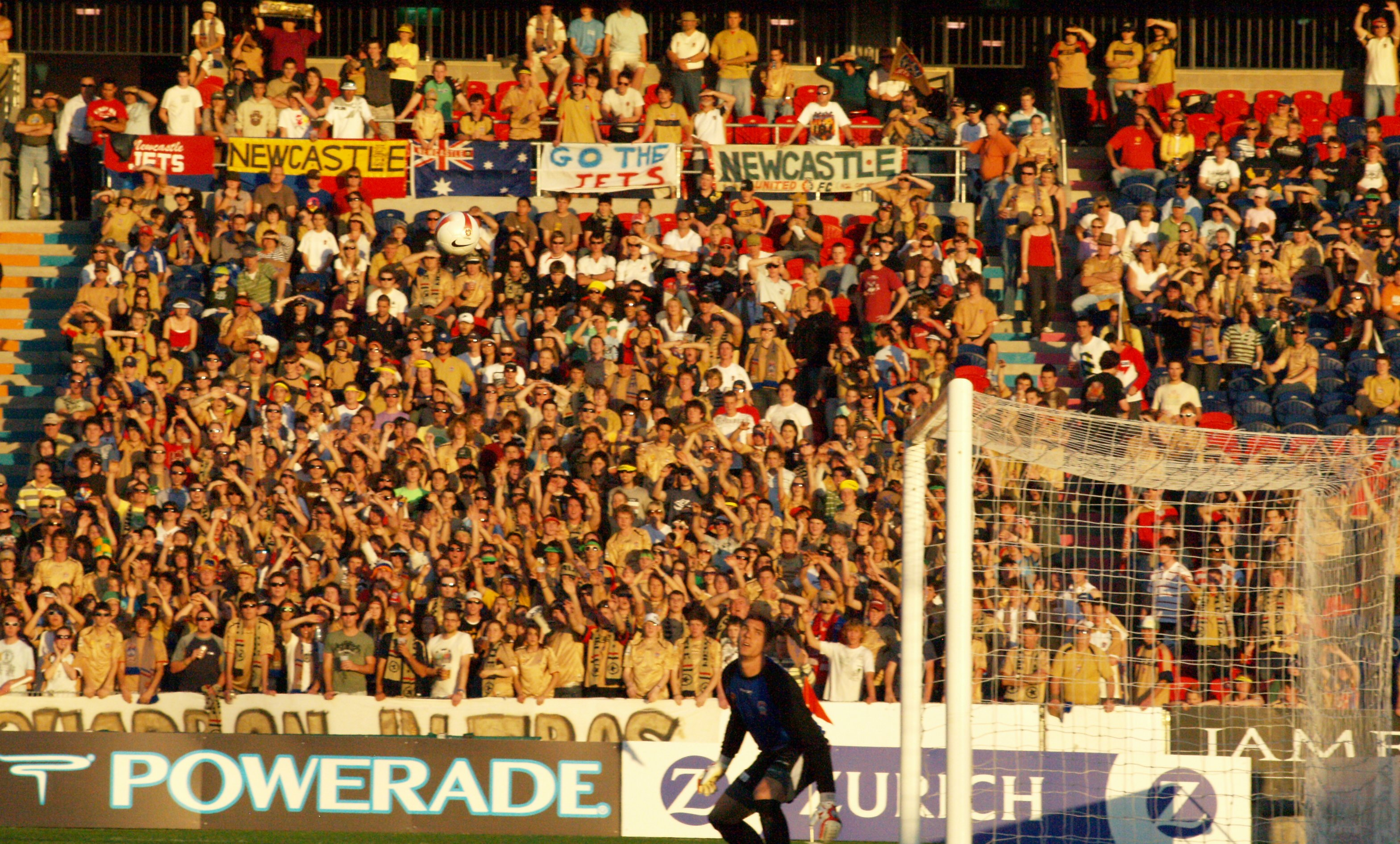
Covic playing for Newcastle Jets in front of the club's fans in 2007

PAOK

- Greek Football Cup: 2000–01

Newcastle Jets

- A-League Championship: 2007–08

Western Sydney Wanderers

- A-League Premiership: 2012–13
- AFC Champions League: 2014

Individual

- Melbourne Victory Victory Medal: 2011–12
- A-League Goalkeeper of the Year: 2012–13
- PFA A-League Team of the Season: 2012–13
- A-League All Star: 2013
- AFC Champions League Most Valuable Player: 2014

Records

- Oldest Western Sydney Wanderers player: 39 years, 326 days
- Oldest Perth Glory player: 40 years, 309 days
