= Scott Galloway (soccer) =

Australian soccer player (born 1995)

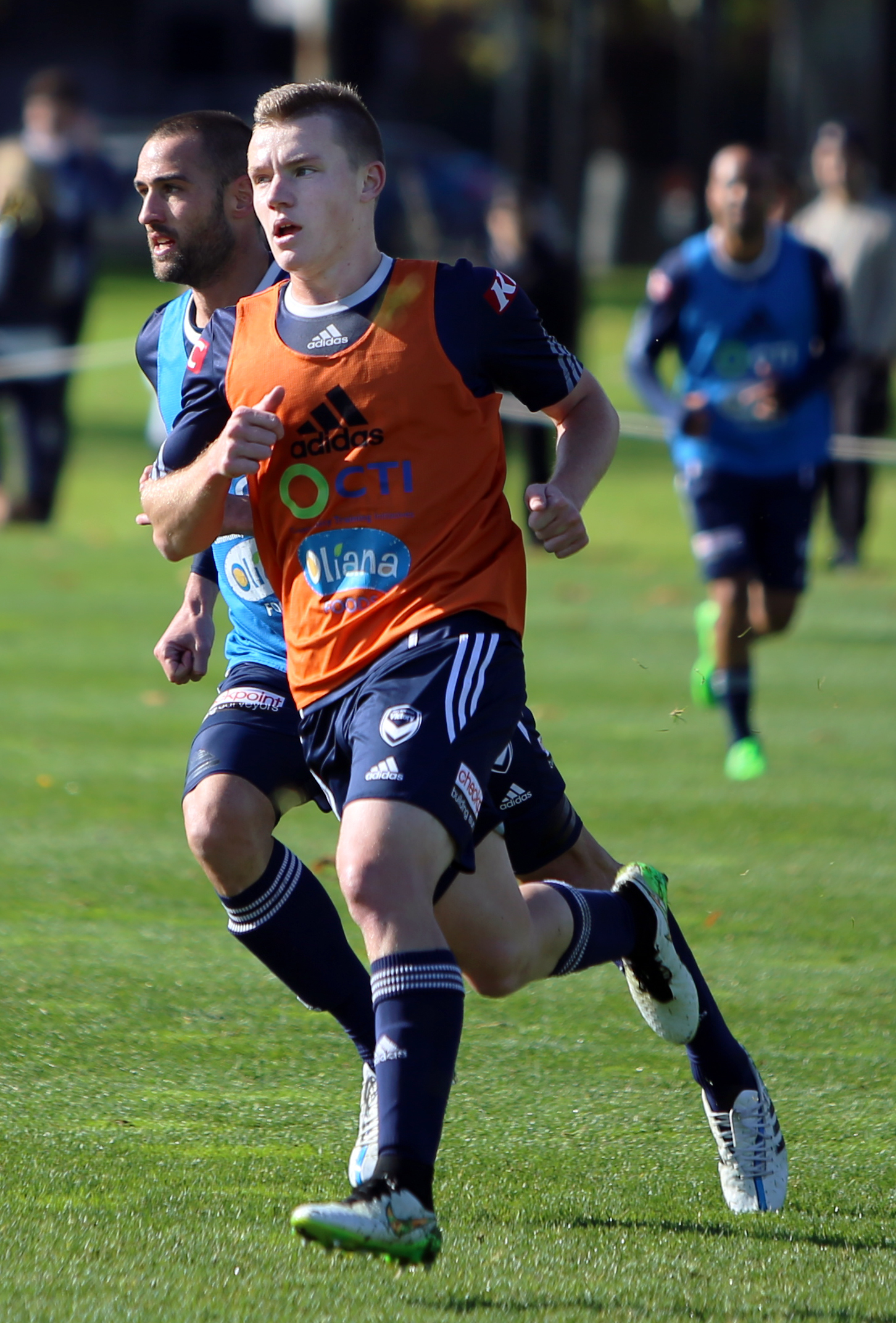
- Galloway with Melbourne Victory in 2015

Personal information
- Full name: Scott Robert Galloway
- Date of birth: 25 April 1995 (age 31)
- Place of birth: Perth, Australia
- Height: 1.72 m (5 ft 8 in)
- Positions: Fullback; defensive midfielder

Youth career
- Gosnells City
- Cockburn City
- 2012–2013: AIS
- 2013: Melbourne Victory

Senior career*
Years	Team	Apps	(Gls)
2013–2016	Melbourne Victory	54	(1)
2016–2017	Central Coast Mariners	24	(2)
2017–2018	Wellington Phoenix	22	(0)
2018−2019	Adelaide United	29	(1)
2019–2024	Melbourne City	92	(4)
2024–2025	Auckland FC	4	(0)

International career^{‡}
2013–2015	Australia U20	15	(1)
2014–2016	Australia U23	13	(0)
- * Club domestic league appearances and goals as of 20 January 2026 ‡ National team caps and goals as of 16 January 2016

Scott Robert Galloway (born 25 April 1995) is an Australian former professional soccer player who played as a fullback.

Born in Perth, Galloway played youth football for the Australian Institute of Sport before making his professional debut for Melbourne Victory in 2013. He moved to Central Coast Mariners in 2016.

Galloway made numerous appearances for Australia's under-20 and under-23 sides. He played in the 2013 FIFA U-20 World Cup.

== Early life ==
Galloway's father, himself a football fan, grew up in Northern Ireland before moving to Australia, where Scott was born. His first club was Gosnells City in Perth, and he initially played in midfield before later moving into the defence. He was also a youth taekwondo champion.

== Club career ==
=== Melbourne Victory ===
Galloway was one of three Melbourne Victory summer signings of 2013, along with Francesco Stella and Jesse Makarounas. He debuted in the Melbourne derby against crosstown rivals Melbourne Heart on 2 February 2013, a game in which they won 2-1, with goals from Archie Thompson and Mark Milligan. Galloway scored his first goal for the club in a loss to Wellington Phoenix on 2 March 2015.

=== Central Coast Mariners ===
On 19 October 2016, Galloway left Melbourne Victory after failing to secure regular game time at the club and joined Central Coast Mariners. He made his first appearance for the club as a substitute in a loss to Brisbane Roar three days later.

In May 2017, the Mariners allowed Galloway to travel to the Netherlands for a trial with Willem II. Three days later, the Mariners announced that Galloway would be leaving the club, although this was said not to be directly related to his Dutch trial.

=== Wellington Phoenix ===
Despite trialing in the Netherlands, on 29 June 2017, Galloway joined Wellington Phoenix on a one-year contract following Rado Vidošić and Darije Kalezić convincing him it would be the best place for him to develop his game.

=== Adelaide United ===
After being on trial for the club, Galloway officially signed for A-League side Adelaide United for the 2018–19 season. He scored his first goal for Adelaide in the first game of the 2018–19 A-League, a 1–1 draw with Sydney FC.

=== Melbourne City ===
Following the end of his tenure at Adelaide, Galloway signed for Melbourne City ahead of the 2019–20 A-League season. He made his league debut for the club in a 0-0 draw against his former side Melbourne Victory. Galloway would go on to make 106 appearances for the club across all competitions, scoring seven goals and lifting the A-League Premiers Plate three times and the A-League Championship once in what is cited as the clubs most successful period so far. Following the end of the 2023–24 A-League season he would depart the City via mutual termination of his remaining contract.

=== Auckland FC ===
Scott Galloway would sign for expansion club Auckland FC for their inaugural campaign ahead of the 2024–25 A-League season. Galloway would only go on to make four substitute appearances for Auckland as a calf injury ruled him out for a majority of the season. Galloway departed Auckland FC following the end of their Premiership winning season via mutual termination, citing a desire to return to Australia to be with his family. Galloway has since retired from professional football due to his injuries and began to focus on coaching the next generation of footballers.

== Career statistics ==
As of 12 May 2024

Appearances and goals by club, season and competition
Club	Season	League			National Cup (Note: Includes the FFA Cup)		Asia (Note: All appearances in AFC Champions League.)		Total	
Club	Season	Division	Apps	Goals	Apps	Goals	Apps	Goals	Apps	Goals
Melbourne Victory	2012–13	A-League	11	0	—		—		11	0
Melbourne Victory	2013–14	A-League	19	0	—		3	0	22	0
Melbourne Victory	2014–15	A-League	13	1	2	0	—		15	1
Melbourne Victory	2015–16	A-League	11	0	2	0	3	0	16	0
Melbourne Victory	2016–17	A-League	0	0	1	0	—		1	0
Melbourne Victory	Melbourne Victory Total		54	1	5	0	6	0	65	1
Central Coast Mariners	2016–17	A-League	24	2	0	0	—		24	2
Wellington Phoenix	2017–18	A-League	22	0	1	0	—		23	0
Adelaide United	2018–19	A-League	29	1	5	0	—		34	1
Melbourne City	2019–20	A-League	22	1	5	1	—		27	2
Melbourne City	2020–21	A-League	21	3	—		—		21	3
Melbourne City	2021–22	A-League	16	1	2	2	1	0	19	3
Melbourne City	2022–23	A-League	21	0	1	0	1	0	23	0
Melbourne City	2023–24	A-League	12	0	1	0	4	0	17	0
Melbourne City	Melbourne City Total		92	5	9	3	6	0	107	7
Auckland FC	2024–25	A-League	4	0	0	0	—		4	0
Career total			225	9	20	3	12	0	258	12

== Honours ==
Melbourne Victory

- A-League Premiership: 2014–15
- A-League Championship: 2014–15
- FFA Cup: 2015

Adelaide United

- FFA Cup: 2018

Melbourne City

- A-League Premiership: 2020–21, 2021–22, 2022–23
- A-League Championship: 2020–21

Auckland FC

- A-League Premiership: 2024-25
