= Francesco Stella (soccer) =

Australian soccer player

Personal information
- Full name: Francesco Stella
- Date of birth: 25 July 1991 (age 35)
- Place of birth: Melbourne, Australia
- Height: 1.82 m (6 ft 0 in)
- Position: Attacking midfielder

Youth career
- 2007–2008: A.C. ChievoVerona

Senior career*
Years	Team	Apps	(Gls)
2008–2009	South Melbourne	19	(2)
2009–2012	A.C. Siena	0	(0)
2011–2012	→ Borgo a Buggiano	21	(1)
2012–2013	Rangers	0	(0)
2013–2014	Melbourne Victory	6	(0)
2015	Sisaket	3	(0)
2015	Avondale	10	(2)
2016	Central Coast Mariners	8	(0)
2016	Nest Sotra	6	(1)
2016	Avondale	4	(0)
2017–2019	Port Melbourne	59	(12)
2019	Caroline Springs George Cross	8	(4)
2020	Port Melbourne	5	(3)
2021	Caroline Springs George Cross	14	(2)
2022	Port Melbourne	16	(1)
- * Club domestic league appearances and goals as of 3 November 2022

Francesco Stella (Italian pronunciation: [franˈtʃeskо ˈstella]; born 25 July 1991) is an Australian footballer who plays as a midfielder for Port Melbourne in the National Premier Leagues Victoria.

== Club career ==
=== Early years ===
Francesco Stella spent the 2007–08 season with the AC Chievo Verona youth team before returning to Australia to play for South Melbourne FC in the Victorian Premier League. Stella made his South debut against Altona Magic late in the 2008 season, when he replaced Fernando de Moraes. He made another substitute appearance against Richmond the following week before making a more consistent 19 appearances in 2009, scoring 2 goals. Stella was named as South Melbourne's U/21 player of the year for the 2009 season.

=== A.C Siena ===
In late 2009, he went to Italy where he was offered a three-year contract by Siena. Stella was part of the senior squad, at the time managed by Antonio Conte, although during his first year at the club he mainly played with the Primavera squad managed my Michele Mignani.

From 2011 to 2012, Stella went out on loan to Italian Lega Pro club U.S. Borgo a Buggiano 1920. Under head coach Gianluca Colonello, Stella made 21 appearances, scoring four goals and assisting 6 for the club before returning to Siena to begin the 2012/13 campaign.

=== Glasgow Rangers ===
He later moved to Scottish club Rangers for the start of the 2012–13, before returning to Australia with Melbourne Victory. He scored in a 3–1 friendly match win over Falkirk at Ibrox Stadium.

=== Melbourne Victory ===
On 17 January 2013, it was confirmed that Stella had signed a 2 1/2-year deal with Melbourne Victory after impressing coach Ange Postecoglou, becoming their third signing of the summer, along with Jesse Makarounas and Scott Galloway. He made his debut for the Victory in The Big Blue match against Sydney FC, coming on as a substitute for Marcos Flores in the 76th minute of the match. The Victory ended up winning the game 3–1, courtesy of goals from Marco Rojas and Archie Thompson.

Stella spent the majority of the 2013–14 season playing in the National Youth League, scoring eight goals. Stella was released by the Victory in July 2014. He had made just seven appearances during his time at the Victory.

=== Sisaket FC ===
Stella signed for Sisaket FC for the start of the 2015 Thai Premier League season as their designated Asia quota player. Stella left the club at the end of the first leg of the season to pursue other options.

=== Avondale FC ===
In June 2015, Stella signed a short-term contract with local club Avondale FC in the NPL Victoria. In his first game for the club he assisted two goals in a 3–0 away win over Port Melbourne SC. Stella scored 2 goals in his ten appearances for the club and was an important figure in keeping Avondale in the NPL. In November 2015, Avondale confirmed that Stella had re-signed with the club for the 2016 NPL Victoria season.

=== Central Coast Mariners ===
In January 2016, Stella signed a one-year contract with A-League club Central Coast Mariners until the end of the 2015–16 A-League season. After making eight appearances, Stella did not resign with the Mariners.

=== Nest Sotra Fotball ===
Stella signed a short-term contract with Norwegian Obos Liga Club Nest Sotra in until the conclusion of the domestic season on 31 October 2016.

=== Port Melbourne ===
Stella signed with Port Melbourne for the 2017 Victorian National Premier League season.

== Career statistics ==
As of 5 June 2016

Appearances and goals by club, season and competition
Club	Season	League			Cup		Continental		Total	
Club	Season	Division	Apps	Goals	Apps	Goals	Apps	Goals	Apps	Goals
South Melbourne	2008	Victorian Premier League	2	0	0	0	0	0	2	0
South Melbourne	2009	Victorian Premier League	17	2	0	0	0	0	17	0
South Melbourne	South Melbourne total		19	0	0	0	0	0	19	0
Siena	2009–10	Serie A	0	0	0	0	0	0	0	0
Siena	2010–11	Serie B	0	0	0	0	0	0	0	0
Siena	Siena total		0	0	0	0	0	0	0	0
Borgo a Buggiano (loan)	2011–12	Lega Pro 2	21	4	0	0	0	0	21	1
Rangers	2012–13	Scottish Third Division	0	0	0	0	0	0	0	0
Melbourne Victory	2012–13	A-League	6	0	0	0	0	0	6	0
Melbourne Victory	2013–14	A-League	0	0	0	0	0	0	0	0
Melbourne Victory	Melbourne Victory total		6	0	0	0	0	0	6	0
Sisaket	2015	Thai Premier League	4	0	0	0	0	0	3	0
Avondale	2015	National Premier Leagues	10	2	0	0	0	0	10	1
Central Coast Mariners	2015–16	A-League	8	0	0	0	0	0	8	0
Avondale	2016	National Premier Leagues	3	0	0	0	0	0	1	0
Nest Sotra	2016	Obos Liga	6	0	0	0	0	0	0	0
Total			72	8	0	0	0	0	72	8
