= Ubay Luzardo =

Spanish footballer

Personal information
- Full name: Ubay Luzardo Santana
- Date of birth: 6 November 1983 (age 43)
- Place of birth: Las Palmas, Spain
- Height: 1.92 m (6 ft 3 1/2 in)
- Positions: Centre back; forward

Youth career
- 1997–1998: Huracán
- 1998–2002: Las Palmas

Senior career*
Years	Team	Apps	(Gls)
2002–2003	Senia		
2003–2004	Norma San Leonardo	19	(1)
2004–2005	Universidad LP B	23	(1)
2005–2006	Murcia B	16	(0)
2006–2007	Rapitenca	18	(3)
2007–2009	Amposta	43	(11)
2009–2012	Kitchee	44	(10)
2012	→ Melbourne Victory (loan)	7	(0)
2012	Assyriska	9	(1)
2013	Ebbsfleet United	3	(0)
2013–2014	Farense	32	(5)
2014	Olhanense	12	(0)
2015	Socuéllamos	6	(0)
2015–2016	Farense	17	(3)
2016	Vélez		
2016–2017	Recreativo	20	(1)
2017–2019	Ebro	54	(2)
2019–2020	Yeclano Deportivo	20	(0)
2020	San Roque	5	(0)
2021	Arucas	17	(0)
- * Club domestic league appearances and goals

Ubay Luzardo Santana (born 6 November 1983) is a Spanish former footballer who played mainly as a central defender.

== Club career ==
=== Early years and Kitchee ===
Born in Las Palmas, Canary Islands, Luzardo came through local UD Las Palmas' youth system, but never represented the senior team. During his early spell in his country, he played only in Tercera División or lower.

In July 2009, Luzardo signed a three-year contract with Hong Kong side Kitchee SC. He appeared in 36 First Division games with seven goals over his first two seasons, winning the national championship in the latter and qualifying to the 2011 Premier League Asia Trophy, where he scored an own goal against Chelsea in the semi-finals and missed a penalty kick in the third-place play-off 0–3 loss to Blackburn Rovers.

Luzardo scored straight off the bench to make it 3–2 for Kitchee against Tai Po FC, before reverting to his usual centre back position.

=== Melbourne Victory ===
In January 2012, Luzardo was invited to trial with Melbourne Victory FC in the A-League. Coach Jim Magilton said: "I like what I saw. I saw a few games pre-season, he played against Chelsea and Blackburn and I like what I see". On 8 February, he signed a loan deal with the club until the end of the campaign.

On 10 March 2012, in the match against Sydney FC, Luzardo was adjudged to have brought down Bruno Cazarine in a 32nd-minute off-the-ball tussle in the box. The conceded penalty resulted in Sydney's 1–0 win, which put an official end to Victory's finals hopes. He subsequently returned to Kitchee only to be released, and went on to play professionally in Sweden and Portugal, with a brief amateur spell with Ebbsfleet United in between.

Luzardo alternated between the Portuguese Segunda Liga and his country's lower leagues in the following years.
