= Theo Markelis =

Australian soccer player

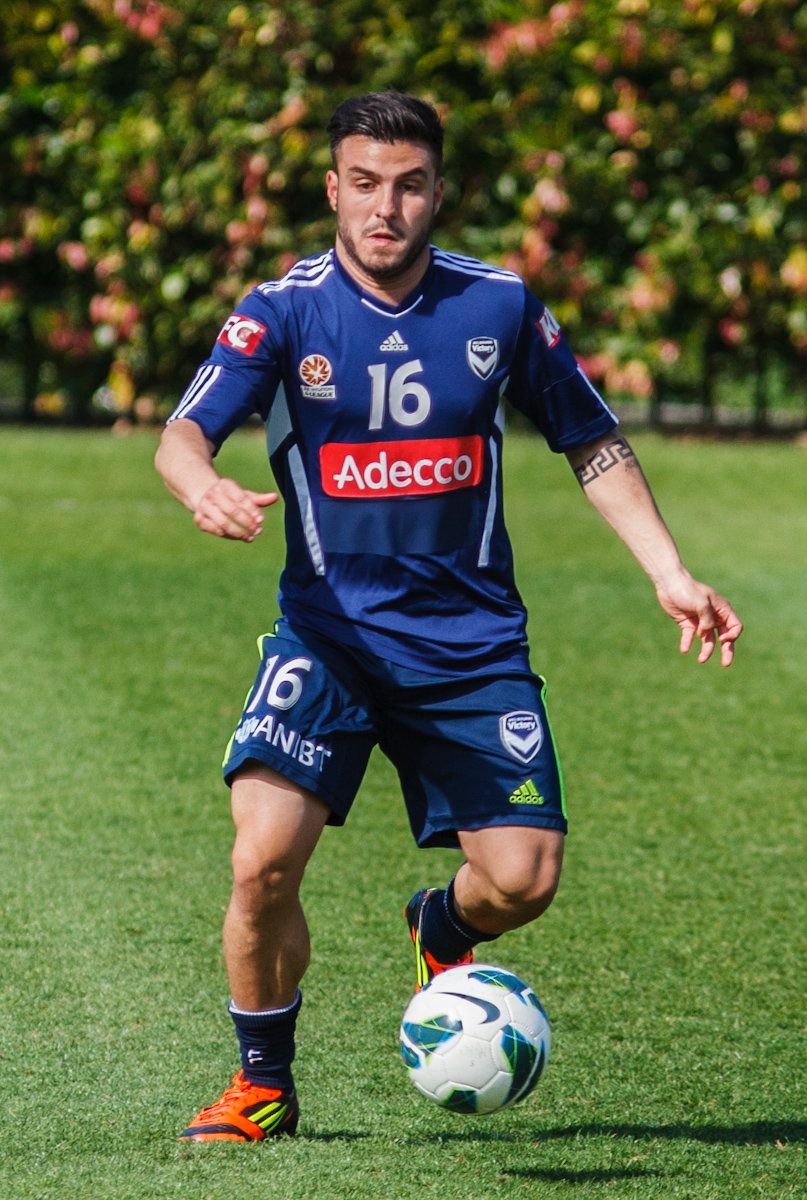
- Markelis warming-up for Melbourne Victory in 2012

Personal information
- Full name: Theodore Markelis
- Date of birth: 24 June 1992 (age 34)
- Place of birth: Melbourne, Australia
- Height: 1.74 m (5 ft 9 in)
- Positions: Striker; winger

Team information
- Current team: Hume City
- Number: 11

Youth career
- 1999–2003: Brunswick City
- 2003–2007: Green Gully
- 2007–2010: Valencia CF
- 2010–2012: Vicenza
- 2012–2013: Melbourne Victory

Senior career*
Years	Team	Apps	(Gls)
2012–2013	Melbourne Victory	5	(0)
2013	Racing Santander	0	(0)
2014	Hércules B	0	(0)
2014–2015	Veria	0	(0)
2015–2017	Hume City	67	(17)
2017–2019	Dandenong Thunder	26	(3)
2019–2021	Hume City	48	(2)
2022	Caroline Springs George Cross	13	(0)
2022–	Altona East Phoenix	7	(3)

International career^{‡}
2010–2011	Australia U-20	3	(0)
- * Club domestic league appearances and goals as of 5 December 2022 ‡ National team caps and goals as of 23:32, 5 October 2012 (UTC)

Theo Markelis (born 24 June 1992) is an Australian footballer who is currently playing for Hume City.

== Career ==
=== Club career ===
Whilst in Australia he played for Green Gully SC. In 2007, at the age of 15 he went to Spain where he was offered a contract by Valencia CF to play in the youth team, and averaged 15 goals per season. He later moved to Serie B side Vicenza for the start of the 2010–11, before returning to Australia.

=== Melbourne Victory ===
On 2 July 2012, it was confirmed that Markelis had signed a two-year deal with Melbourne Victory after impressing coach Ange Postecoglou.

Markelis was released from Melbourne Victory on 31 July 2013.

=== Return to Spain ===
In October 2013, Theo Markelis signed with Segunda B Spanish side, Racing de Santander but was not liked by his manager Paco Fernandez and did not make an appearance for the first team. In January 2014 the player was released and he signed for Hércules CF B.

=== Move to Greece ===
On 3 September 2014, the Greek Super League club Veria announced the signing of Theo.

=== Return to Melbourne ===
On 1 May 2015, Theo Markelis signed for Hume City in the mid season transfer window of the National Premier Leagues Victoria after failing to break into the first team with the Greek club Veria.
