= Petar Franjic =

Australian footballer

Personal information
- Full name: Petar Franjic
- Date of birth: 7 April 1992 (age 34)
- Place of birth: Melbourne, Australia
- Height: 1.85 m (6 ft 1 in)
- Positions: Defender; defensive midfielder

Team information
- Current team: FC Strathmore

Youth career
- 2005–2007: Bulleen Lions
- 2007–2009: VIS
- 2009: Melbourne Knights
- 2009–2010: Melbourne Victory

Senior career*
| Years | Team | Apps | (Gls) |
| 2009 | Melbourne Knights | 6 | (0) |
| 2010–2013 | Melbourne Victory | 31 | (0) |
| 2011 | FFV NTC | 7 | (0) |
| 2013 | Richmond SC | 14 | (0) |
| 2014 | Hume City | 14 | (2) |
| 2014 | Olmaliq | 3 | (0) |
| 2015–2016 | Hume City | 28 | (2) |
| 2017 | Avondale FC | 19 | (0) |
| 2018–2019 | Preston Lions | 4 | (0) |
| 2019-2020 | Dandenong City | 13 | (0) |
| 2021– | FC Strathmore | 26 | (0) |

International career^{‡}
| 2007–2009 | Australia U-17 | 16 | (0) |
| 2009–2011 | Australia U-20 | 9 | (1) |
- * Club domestic league appearances and goals as of 5 December 2022 ‡ National team caps and goals as of 17:30, 7 August 2011 (UTC)

Petar Franjic (born 7 April 1992) is an Australian footballer who currently plays for Avondale FC in the National Premier Leagues Victoria.

== Club career ==
Franjic joined the Melbourne Knights FC under 21 squad in 2009 after spending a number of years with the Victorian Institute of Sport. That year, he made his breakthrough into senior football, making six appearances for the first team in the Victorian Premier League in the first half of the season.

He was then picked up by A-League side Melbourne Victory FC, initially with the youth team. On 10 May 2010, he was signed to a two-year professional contract with Victory. On 9 January 2013, it was announced that Petar Franjic was released by mutual termination by Melbourne Victory to seek first team, playing opportunities. In his three seasons with the Victory, Franjic made 31 appearances in the league.

After short stints with Victorian sides Richmond SC and Hume City FC, in August 2014, Franjic moved to Uzbek League side Olmaliq. The Uzbeq adventure didn't last long for Franjic, who returned to Australia after making just three league appearances.

Upon his return to Australia, Franjic once more signed for Hume City FC.

Franjic signed for Avondale FC for the 2017 season.

== Honours ==
With Australia:

- AFF U-16 Youth Championship: 2008
