= Luke O'Dea (footballer) =

Australian association football player (born 1993)

Personal information
- Full name: Luke O'Dea
- Date of birth: 14 April 1993 (age 33)
- Place of birth: Warragul, Victoria, Australia
- Height: 1.78 m (5 ft 10 in)
- Position: Attacking midfielder

Team information
- Current team: Gippsland United
- Number: 9

Youth career
- 2009: VIS
- 2009–2013: Melbourne Victory
- 2013–2014: Melbourne Heart

Senior career*
Years	Team	Apps	(Gls)
2011	FFV NTC	5	(2)
2012–2013	Melbourne Victory	2	(0)
2012–2013	Bentleigh Greens	22	(6)
2013–2014	Melbourne City	0	(0)
2014–2015	Bentleigh Greens	15	(0)
2016–	Gippsland United	10	(1)

International career^{‡}
2012	Australia U20	3	(0)
- * Club domestic league appearances and goals as of 22 February 2022 ‡ National team caps and goals as of 10 January 2013

Luke O'Dea (born 14 April 1993) is an Australian association football player who played two games as an attacking midfielder for Melbourne Victory in the A-League.
