= SS Anderson Reserve =

Football venue in Victoria, Australia

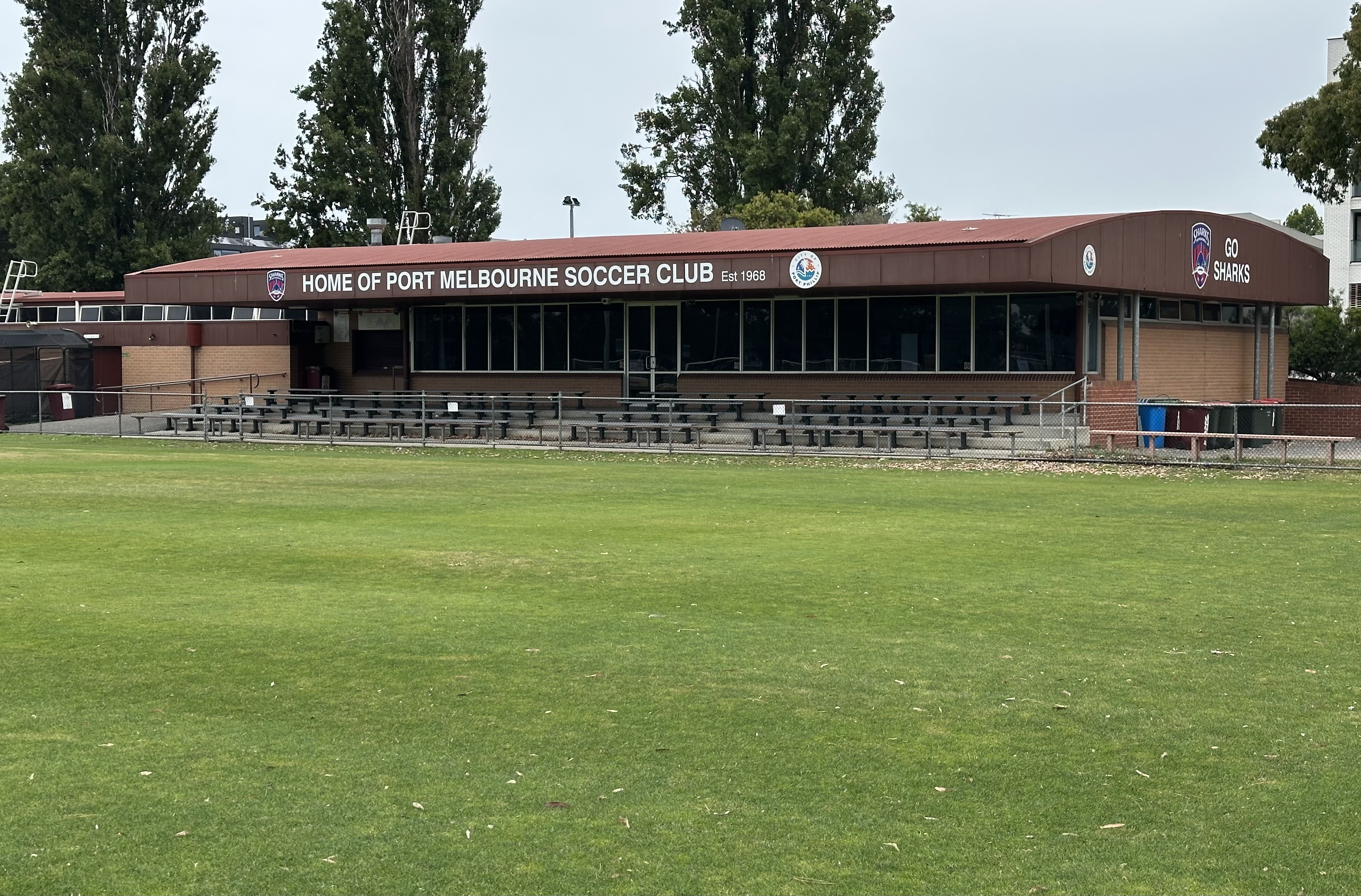
- Interactive map of SS Anderson Reserve
- Location: Port Melbourne, Victoria, Australia
- Coordinates: 37°49′59.92″S 144°55′44.17″E
- Owner: City of Port Phillip
- Capacity: 1,000
- Surface: Grass

Tenant
- Port Melbourne Sharks

SS Anderson Reserve is a football venue in JL Murphy Reserve, Port Melbourne. It is the home of the Port Melbourne Sharks club, who currently play in the National Premier Leagues Victoria.

Over the years the club has developed and expanded its facilities into one of the best in the inner city. The facilities are sufficient standard to warrant being used as training facilities for both the Commonwealth and Olympic Games. The facilities also received an upgrade for use as a training venue for the 2015 AFC Asian Cup.
