= Julius Davies =

Sierra Leonean-Australian soccer player

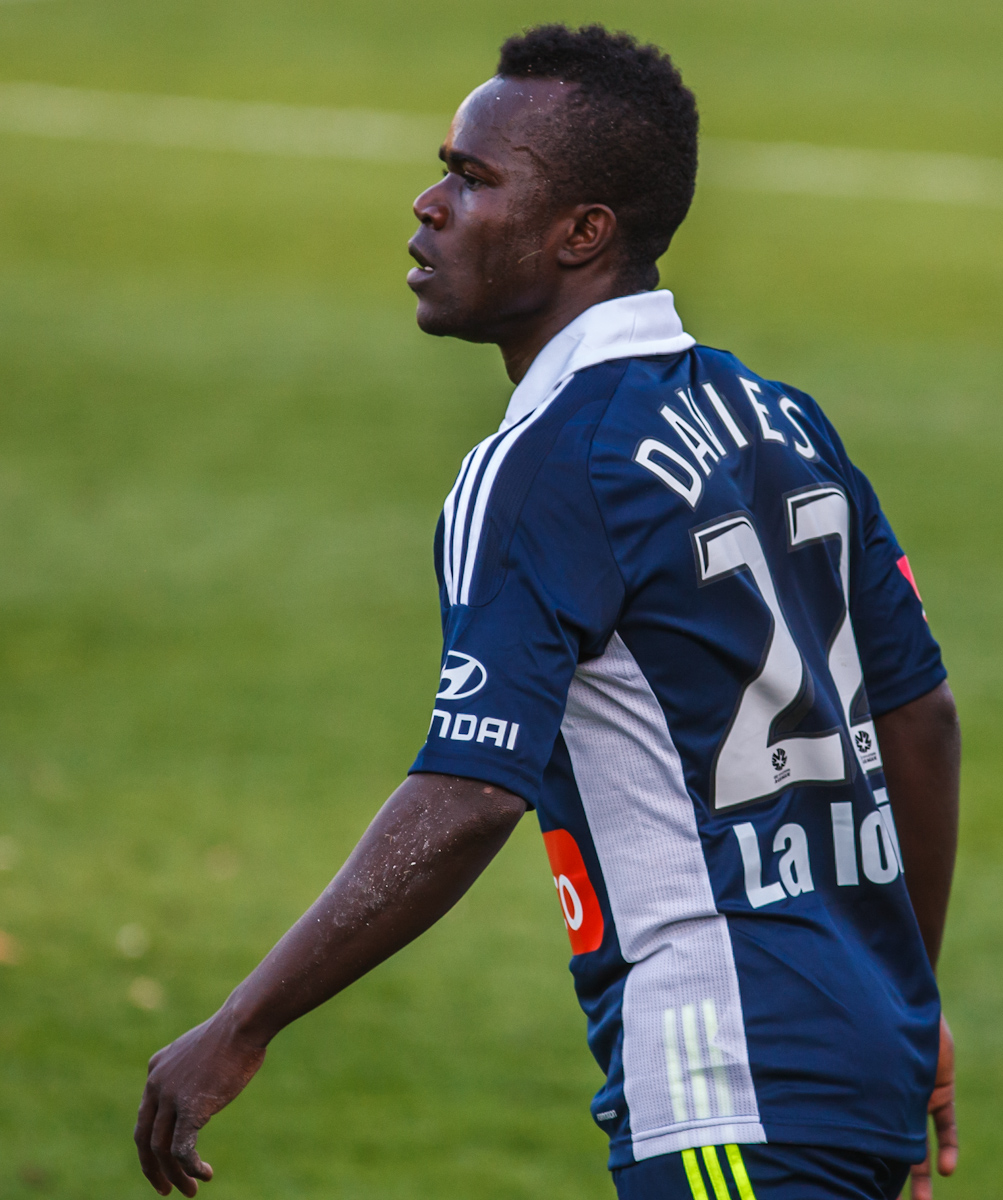
- Davies playing for Melbourne Victory in 2012

Personal information
- Full name: Julius Doe Davies
- Date of birth: 30 September 1994 (age 32)
- Place of birth: Monrovia, Liberia
- Height: 1.65 m (5 ft 5 in)
- Positions: Striker; midfielder

Team information
- Current team: Westgate FC

Youth career
- 2003–2005: Swan IC
- 2006: Inglewood United SC
- 2009–2011: Bayern Munich
- 2011–2012: 1899 Hoffenheim

Senior career*
Years	Team	Apps	(Gls)
2012–2013	Melbourne Victory	2	(0)
2013–2014	Brisbane Roar	2	(0)
2014	Oţelul Galaţi	0	(0)
2015	Port Melbourne	21	(1)
2016	Northcote City	0	(0)
2016	Melbourne Knights	7	(0)
2022–	Westgate FC	12	(0)

International career
2008	Australia U17		
- * Club domestic league appearances and goals

Julius Doe Davies (born 30 September 1994) is a Sierra Leonean-Australian football (soccer) player who last played for Melbourne Knights FC in the NPL Victoria.

== Career ==
=== Early career ===
Whilst in Australia he played for Swan IC Football Club Julius started his football career. In 2006 he moved to Inglewood where he definitely made a huge step forward towards a professional career. In fact, at Inglewood, Julius won the u/15's Premier League and the State Cup resulting to be the best youth player of that year. In 2009 Julius went to Germany where he was offered a contract by Bayern Munich to play in the U17 team, which he scored nine goals from 20 appearances. He later moved to 1899 Hoffenheim only making five appearances in their U19 team, before returning to Australia at the age of seventeen. He started training with Melbourne Victory and signed a youth contract with the club until the end of the 2011–12 A-League season.

=== Melbourne Victory ===
On 24 January 2012, it was confirmed that Davies had signed with Melbourne Victory after impressing the staff during his two weeks of training with the club. On 16 March 2012 it was confirmed that Davies was cleared to play for Melbourne Victory and on the same day made his professional debut for the club in a round 26 match against Wellington Phoenix at AAMI Park as an 81st-minute substitute for Harry Kewell in which Melbourne won 3–0, picking up an assist in the process. Julius then continued his stay at Melbourne Victory by signing an extension to 30 April 2013. On 9 January 2013, it was announced that he was to leave the club by mutual termination.

=== Brisbane Roar ===
On 9 January 2013, he signed with A-League club Brisbane Roar after his contract with Melbourne Victory was mutually terminated. Davies made his Brisbane Roar debut against the Western Sydney Wanderers at Suncorp Stadium in Brisbane on 20 January 2013, as an 81st-minute substitute for Ben Halloran. The Brisbane Roar gave Julius Doe Davies an early release before the start of the 2014/2015 A-League season to join Liga I outfit, Otelul Galati, in Romania.

=== Oţelul Galaţi ===
Julius Doe Davies joined Romanian Liga I outfit, Otelul Galati at the start of the 2014/2015 season.

=== NPL Victoria ===
Davies spent the 2015 season with Port Melbourne SC but was released at the end of that campaign. He joined Northcote City on the registration deadline day ahead of the 2016 season.

=== Melbourne Knights ===
On 9 June 2016, Davies signed with former National League champions Melbourne Knights during the NPL Victoria mid-season transfer window.

== Personal life ==
Davies was born in Monrovia, Liberia. He came to Perth, Australia from Sierra Leone as an eleven-year-old refugee.
