= Matthew Foschini =

Australian footballer

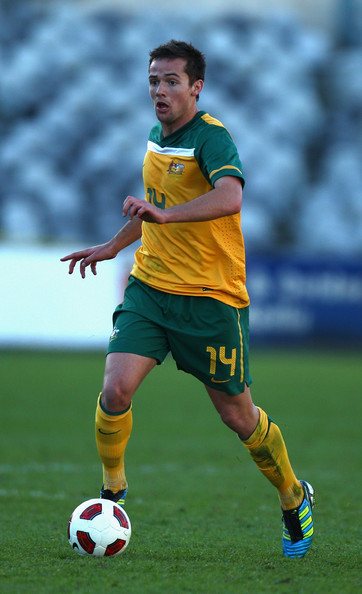

Personal information
- Date of birth: 19 October 1990 (age 36)
- Place of birth: Melbourne, Australia
- Height: 1.81 m (5 ft 11 in)
- Position: Defender

Team information
- Current team: Berwick City
- Number: 23

Youth career
- Glen Waverley
- 2007–2008: Oakleigh Cannons
- 2008–2009: Melbourne Victory

Senior career*
Years	Team	Apps	(Gls)
2009–2013	Melbourne Victory	53	(0)
2013–2014	Salgaocar	19	(1)
2015	Oakleigh Cannons	6	(0)
2016–2018	South Melbourne	90	(2)
2019–2022	Oakleigh Cannons	74	(3)
2026–	Berwick City	18	(1)

International career^{‡}
2011–2012	Australia U23	13	(0)
- * Club domestic league appearances and goals as of 5 September 2026 ‡ National team caps and goals as of 17:30, 11 June 2017 (UTC)

Matthew Foschini (born 19 October 1990) is an Australian footballer who plays as a defender for Berwick City in Victorian State League.

== Club career ==
=== Early career ===
Foschini began his football career at Glen Waverley Junior Soccer Club.

=== Melbourne Victory ===
On 18 August 2009, Foschini was signed to a contract with the Melbourne Victory senior squad on a two-year deal, becoming the first player to be signed straight from the Youth Academy. On 27 December 2009 he made his starting debut for Victory against North Queensland Fury in a 1–0 loss.

In 2012, Foschini signed another two-year contract deal with Melbourne Victory. He was given the number 2 jersey from Kevin Muscat.

Foschini was a part of Victory's 2010-2012 ACL campaigns, where played 11 games.

Foschini played a number of exhibition matches for Victory including LA Galaxy FC, Boca Juniors FC, Celtic FC, and Olympiakos FC .

On 8 August 2013, Foschini was released by the Victory.

=== Salgaocar ===
On 31 October 2013, Foschini signed for I-League club Salgaocar F.C. He made his debut for Salgaocar in the I-League on 22 November 2013 against Pune F.C. at the Duler Stadium in which he played the whole match as Salgaocar drew the match 1–1. On 18 December 2014, he scored against Mumbai F.C. in the Group Stage of the 2013–14 Indian Federation Cup, Slagaocar would ultimately win 2–1.

=== Ottawa Fury FC ===
Foschini trained with Ottawa Fury FC from early pre-season through to mid May 2015. He trained with the team full-time and played several pre-season matches. Marc Dos Santos said Foschini would have been signed already if Fury wasn't carrying the maximum number of international players."I loved him ... he's definitely an NASL-level player," said Dos Santos. "We're going to keep a door open, a good contact and maybe he could be an option in 2016."

=== Oakleigh Cannons FC ===
In June 2015, Matthew joined Oakleigh Cannons FC. Foschini was an integral part of getting the team to the FFA Cup Finals. Foschini was a versatile defender for Oakleigh and the big games was what he thrived on. Oakleigh Cannons coach Arthur Papas wished he had another 10 Matt Foschini's at his disposal following the club's heartbreaking FFA Cup quarter-final exit against Hume City.

=== South Melbourne FC ===
In December 2015, South Melbourne FC signed Foschini. South experience a shortage of defenders in 2015, and Foschini could play a number of defensive positions including right back, centre-half or holding midfield. South Melbourne won the NPL Victoria Championship, defeating Oakleigh Cannons. Foschini was awarded with the club's Most Valuable Player and Media's Team Player Choice.

== Personal life ==
Foschini was born in Melbourne, Victoria. He is the son of former Australian rules footballer Silvio Foschini. He attended Caulfield Grammar School, where he captained the First XI Team.

== See also ==
- List of Caulfield Grammar School people
