= 2014 Shanghai Greenland Shenhua F.C. season =

Shanghai Greenland
- Chairman: Zhu Jun
- Manager: Shen Xiangfu (until 29 March 2014); Sergio Batista (from 29 March 2014)
- Super League: 9th
- FA Cup: Semi-finals
- Top goalscorer: League: Giovanni Moreno (8); All: Giovanni Moreno (11)
| Home colours | Away colours |

The 2014 Shanghai Greenland Shenhua season was Shanghai Greenland Shenhua's 11th season in the Chinese Super League and 52nd overall in the Chinese top flight. They also competed in the Chinese FA Cup, reaching the Semi-Finals.

== Squad ==
Updated 27 June 2014. Note: Flags indicate national team as defined under FIFA eligibility rules; some limited exceptions apply. Players may hold more than one non-FIFA nationality.

| No. | Pos. | Nation | Player |
|---|---|---|---|
| 1 | GK | CHN | Geng Xiaofeng |
| 3 | DF | HKG | Brian Fok |
| 5 | DF | KOR | Cho Byung-Kuk |
| 6 | DF | CHN | Li Wenbo |
| 7 | MF | CHN | Wang Changqing |
| 8 | MF | CHN | Fan Lingjiang |
| 10 | MF | COL | Giovanni Moreno (captain) |
| 12 | DF | CHN | Bai Jiajun |
| 13 | DF | BRA | Paulo André |
| 14 | DF | CHN | Gu Bin |
| 15 | MF | CHN | Zhan Yilin |
| 16 | MF | CHN | Wang Fei |
| 17 | MF | TPE | Chen Po-liang |
| 18 | FW | CHN | Gao Di |
| 19 | DF | CHN | Zheng Kaimu |

| No. | Pos. | Nation | Player |
|---|---|---|---|
| 20 | MF | CHN | Xu Liang |
| 21 | MF | CHN | Jiang Kun |
| 22 | GK | CHN | Qiu Shengjiong |
| 23 | DF | CHN | Liu Jiashen |
| 24 | GK | CHN | Shen Jun |
| 25 | MF | CHN | Su Shun |
| 26 | MF | CHN | Liang Yu |
| 27 | MF | CHN | Han Yi |
| 28 | MF | CHN | Cao Yunding |
| 29 | DF | CHN | Yuan Shaohua |
| 30 | DF | CHN | Tao Jin |
| 31 | FW | BRA | Paulo Henrique |
| 34 | FW | ARG | Lucas Viatri |
| 36 | MF | CHN | Wang Shouting |
| 57 | MF | CHN | Liu Jiawei |

=== Reserve squad ===
Note: Flags indicate national team as defined under FIFA eligibility rules; some limited exceptions apply. Players may hold more than one non-FIFA nationality.

| No. | Pos. | Nation | Player |
|---|---|---|---|
| 41 | GK | CHN | Dong Guangxiang |
| 42 | GK | CHN | Dong Hang |
| 43 | MF | CHN | Yang Chen |
| 44 | MF | CHN | Zhang Jiawei |
| 45 | MF | CHN | Li lianxiang |
| 46 | DF | CHN | Liang Wei |
| 47 | FW | CHN | Wu Changqi |
| 48 | MF | CHN | Xiao Bang |
| 49 | MF | CHN | Yan Ge |

| No. | Pos. | Nation | Player |
|---|---|---|---|
| 50 | MF | CHN | Xie Fuquan |
| 51 | MF | CHN | Huang Linhao |
| 52 | MF | CHN | Xiong Zhenfeng |
| 53 | MF | CHN | Zhang Yuhao |
| 54 | MF | CHN | Bo Xiaobo |
| 55 | MF | CHN | Yang Haofeng |
| 59 | MF | CHN | Chen Tao |
| 60 | MF | CHN | Shang Yin |

== Transfers ==
=== Winter ===
In:

| No. | Pos. | Nation | Player |
|---|---|---|---|
| 1 | GK | CHN | Geng Xiaofeng (loan from (China) Shandong Luneng) |
| 5 | DF | KOR | Cho Byung-kuk (from (Japan) Júbilo Iwata) |
| 6 | DF | CHN | Li Wenbo (from (China) Guangzhou R&F) |
| 8 | MF | CHN | Fan Lingjiang (loan return from (China) Jiangxi Liansheng) |
| 9 | FW | COL | Luis Carlos Ruiz (from (Colombia) Junior) |
| 13 | DF | BRA | Paulo André (from (Brazil) Corinthians) |
| 14 | MF | CHN | Gu Bin (loan return from (China) Chongqing) |
| 17 | MF | TPE | Chen Po-liang (from (China) Shenzhen Ruby) |
| 18 | FW | CHN | Gao Di (from (China) Shandong Luneng, previously on loan to (China) Hangzhou Greentown) |
| 24 | GK | CHN | Shen Jun (from (China) Guizhou Renhe) |
| 30 | DF | CHN | Tao Jin (loan return from (China) Hunan Billows) |

Out:

| No. | Pos. | Nation | Player |
|---|---|---|---|
| 1 | GK | CHN | Wang Dalei (to (China) Shandong Luneng) |
| 2 | DF | ARG | Rolando Schiavi (to (Argentina) Club Rivadavia) |
| 4 | DF | CHN | Li Jianbin (loan return to (China) Guangzhou Evergrande) |
| 5 | DF | CHN | Dai Lin (to (China) Shandong Luneng) |
| 8 | MF | CHN | Song Boxuan (to (China) Beijing Guoan) |
| 9 | FW | CPV | Dady (to (China) Xinjiang Tianshan Leopard) |
| 27 | MF | ARG | Patricio Toranzo (to (Argentina) Huracán) |

=== Summer ===
In:

| No. | Pos. | Nation | Player |
|---|---|---|---|
| 2 | DF | HKG | Brian Fok |
| 31 | MF | BRA | Paulo Henrique (from (Turkey) Trabzonspor) |
| 34 | FW | ARG | Lucas Viatri (from (Argentina) Boca Juniors, previously on loan to (Mexico) Chiapas) |

Out:

| No. | Pos. | Nation | Player |
|---|---|---|---|
| 2 | DF | CHN | Xiong Fei (loan to (China) Wuhan Zall) |
| 9 | FW | COL | Luis Carlos Ruiz (to (Colombia) Atlético Nacional) |
| 11 | FW | SYR | Firas Al-Khatib (to (Kuwait) Al-Arabi) |

== Competitions ==
=== Chinese Super League ===
==== Results summary ====
| Overall | | | | | | | | Home | | | | | | Away | | | | | |
| Pld | W | D | L | GF | GA | GD | Pts | W | D | L | GF | GA | GD | W | D | L | GF | GA | GD |
|---|---|---|---|---|---|---|---|---|---|---|---|---|---|---|---|---|---|---|---|
| 30 | 8 | 11 | 11 | 33 | 45 | −12 | 35 | 6 | 4 | 5 | 19 | 21 | −2 | 2 | 7 | 6 | 14 | 24 | −10 |

Last updated: 19 January 2015.
Source: Soccerway

==== Results ====
| 9 March 2014 1 | Shanghai Shenxin | 0–2 | Shanghai Greenland Shenhua | Shanghai |
| 16:00 (UTC+08) | Zuojun (yellow card) 39' | Summary | Di 29', 80'; Liang (yellow card) 63'; Changqing (yellow card) 77' | Stadium: Yuanshen Sports Centre Stadium; Attendance: 12,098; Referee: Huang Yejun |

| 15 March 2014 2 | Shanghai Greenland Shenhua | 1–3 | Hangzhou Greentown | Shanghai |
| 19:45 (UTC+08) | André (yellow card) 18'; Jiajun (yellow card) 34'; Shouting (yellow card) 41'; Liang 45'; Moreno (yellow card) 49' | Summary | Angan 26', 30'; Haiqing (yellow card) 43'; Macena 69' | Stadium: Hongkou Football Stadium; Attendance: 22,325; Referee: Wang Jin |

| 24 March 2014 3 | Beijing Guoan | 2–0 | Shanghai Greenland Shenhua | Beijing |
| 19:30 (UTC+08) | Xizhe 40' (pen.); Batalla 53' | Summary | Moreno (yellow card) 90+1' | Stadium: Workers' Stadium; Attendance: 35,27; Referee: Li Jun |

| 29 March 2014 4 | Shanghai Greenland Shenhua | 0–0 | Henan Jianye | Shanghai |
| 19:45 (UTC+08) | Wenbo (yellow card) 51' | Summary | Wangsong (yellow card) 73' | Stadium: Hongkou Football Stadium; Attendance: 11,231; Referee: Xia Jun |

| 6 April 2014 5 | Changchun Yatai | 2–2 | Shanghai Greenland Shenhua | Changchun |
| 15:30 (UTC+08) | Ismailov 25'; Coelho 90+4' | Report | Ruiz 9' (yellow card) 90+2'; Cho (yellow card) 21'; Yilin (yellow card) 49'; Fei (yellow card) 88' | Stadium: Development Area Stadium; Attendance: 12,156; Referee: Huang Yejun |

| 13 April 2014 6 | Shanghai Greenland Shenhua | 2–0 | Dalian Aerbin | Shanghai |
| 19:45 (UTC+08) | Moreno 16', 74' (yellow card) 23' | Summary | Xuepeng (yellow card) 22'; Dabao (yellow card) 23'; Boyu (yellow card) 72' | Stadium: Hongkou Football Stadium; Attendance: 10,806; Referee: Wang Jin |

| 19 April 2014 7 | Guangzhou Evergrande | 2–1 | Shanghai Greenland Shenhua | Guangzhou |
| 20:00 (UTC+08) | Junyan 41'; Lin 53'; Jian (yellow card) 59' | Summary | Al-Khatib 83' (pen.) | Stadium: Tianhe Stadium; Attendance: 41,500; Referee: Fan Qi |

| 26 April 2014 8 | Shanghai SIPG | 1–1 | Shanghai Shenhua | Shanghai |
| 15:30 (UTC+08) | Jiayu (yellow card) 11'; McBreen 21' (yellow card) 64'; Huikang (yellow card) 90+1'; Shiyuan (red card) 90+5' | Summary | Jiajun (yellow card) 26' (red card) 90+6'; Yunding (yellow card) 29'; Liang 36'; Wenbo (yellow card) 59' | Stadium: Shanghai Stadium; Attendance: 23,286; Referee: Xu Fuxin |

| 29 April 2014 9 | Shanghai Greenland Shenhua | 0–0 | Guangzhou R&F | Shanghai |
| 19:45 (UTC+08) | Shouting (yellow card) 47'; Liang (yellow card) 77'; Yilin (yellow card) 86' | Summary | Yaokun (yellow card) 87' | Stadium: Hongkou Football Stadium; Attendance: 10,753; Referee: Fu Ming |

| 3 May 2014 10 | Guizhou Renhe | 3–0 | Shanghai Shenhua | Guiyang |
| 20:00 (UTC+08) | Hai (yellow card) 18'; Mączyński (yellow card) 31' (goal) 51', 77'; Hyuri 45+1' (yellow card) 71'; Jihai (yellow card) 82' | Summary | André (yellow card) 4'; Di (yellow card) 83'; Lingjiang (yellow card) 90+1' | Stadium: Guiyang Olympic Sports Center; Attendance: 11,231; Referee: Ai Kun |

| 10 May 2014 11 | Shanghai Greenland Shenhua | 1–0 | Shandong Luneng | Shanghai |
| 19:45 (UTC+08) | Shouting (yellow card) 35'; Moreno 56' (pen.); Shengjiong (yellow card) 85' | Summary | Lin (yellow card) 90+1'; Xu (yellow card) 90+5' | Stadium: Hongkou Football Stadium; Attendance: 16,750; Referee: Wang Zhe |

| 17 May 2014 12 | Harbin Yiteng | 3–3 | Shanghai Greenland Shenhua | Harbin |
| 15:30 (UTC+08) | Dori 38', 40', 87'; Hughes (yellow card) 60' | Summary | André (yellow card) 17'; Yunding (yellow card) 30'; Kun 39'; Liang (yellow card) 62'; Di 72'; Moreno 73'; Shouting (yellow card) 86' | Stadium: Harbin Sports City Center Stadium; Attendance: 33,171; Referee: Li Jun |

| 25 May 2014 14 | Tianjin Teda | 1–0 | Shanghai Greenland Shenhua | Tianjin |
| 19:35 (UTC+08) | Benjian 43'; Tao (yellow card) 69'; Weifeng (yellow card) 90+1' | Summary | Changqing (yellow card) 31' | Stadium: Tianjin Olympic Center Stadium; Attendance: 11,937; Referee: Fu Ming |

| 28 May 2014 13 | Shanghai Greenland Shenhua | 1–1 | Jiangsu Guoxin-Sainty | Shanghai |
| 19:45 (UTC+08) | Moreno 26'; Shengjiong (yellow card) 71' | Summary | Xiang (yellow card) 47'; Hang (yellow card) 50'; Ke (yellow card) 74'; Elias 81' | Stadium: Hongkou Football Stadium; Attendance: 12,546; Referee: Guo Hao |

| 10 July 2014 22 | Shanghai Greenland Shenhua | 1–2 | Guangzhou Evergrande | Shanghai |
| 19:45 (UTC+08) | Di 27'; Moreno (yellow card) 80'; Shouting (yellow card) 90' | Summary | Diamanti 9'; Bowen (yellow card) 29'; Fang (yellow card) 72'; Xuri (yellow card) 79'; Hao 90+1' | Stadium: Hongkou Football Stadium; Attendance: 17,235; Referee: Fu Ming |

| 20 July 2014 15 | Shanghai Greenland Shenhua | 3–2 | Liaoning Whowin | Shanghai |
| 19:45 (UTC+08) | Yunding 8'; Viatri 45+2', 82'; André (yellow card) 87'; Jiajun (yellow card) 90+1'; Shengjiong (yellow card) 90+4' | Summary | Taiyan (red card) 49'; Chamanga 59'; Chaosheng 68' | Stadium: Hongkou Football Stadium; Attendance: 14,328; Referee: Huang Yejun |

| 26 July 2014 16 | Shanghai Greenland Shenhua | 2–0 | Shanghai Shenxin | Shanghai |
| 19:45 (UTC+08) | Changqing (yellow card) 45'; Henrique (yellow card) 46' (goal) 64'; Shengjiong (yellow card) 87'; Moreno 90+4' | Summary | | Stadium: Hongkou Football Stadium; Attendance: 15,892; Referee: Wang Zhe |

| 30 July 2014 17 | Hangzhou Greentown | 0–0 | Shanghai Greenland Shenhua | Hangzhou |
| 19:35 (UTC+08) | Gang (yellow card) 90+2' | Summary | Shouting (yellow card) 14'; Cho (yellow card) 50' | Stadium: Huanglong Stadium; Attendance: 13,625; Referee: Zhao Zhizhi |

| 2 August 2014 18 | Shanghai Greenland Shenhua | 0–3 | Beijing Guoan | Shanghai |
| 19:45 (UTC+08) | Changqing (yellow card) 76' | Summary | Damjanović 50'; Xiaobin (yellow card) 79'; Zhizhao 83' (yellow card) 84'; Cheng 89' | Stadium: Hongkou Football Stadium; Attendance: 24,856; Referee: Fu Ming |

| 10 August 2014 19 | Henan Jianye | 2–2 | Shanghai Greenland Shenhua | Zhengzhou |
| 20:00 (UTC+08) | Yifan 53'; Xiyang 61' | Summary | Moreno (yellow card) 50'; Liang 87'; Viatri 90+5' | Stadium: Zhengzhou Hanghai Stadium; Attendance: 16,894; Referee: Zhou Gang |

| 14 August 2014 20 | Shanghai Greenland Shenhua | 2–3 | Changchun Yatai | Shanghai |
| 19:45 (UTC+08) | Moreno (yellow card) 3'; Liang (yellow card) 41'; Fei 61'; Viatri 88' (pen.) | Summary | Ismailov 43'; Huszti (yellow card) 45' (goal) 66'; Eninho 71' (yellow card) 83'; Jianjun (yellow card) 90+3' | Stadium: Hongkou Football Stadium; Attendance: 11,825; Referee: Wang Jin |

| 17 August 2014 21 | Dalian Aerbin | 0–1 | Shanghai Greenland Shenhua | Dalian |
| 19:00 (UTC+08) | Jiaqi (yellow card) 37' | Summary | Henrique 87' | Stadium: Dalian Sports Center; Attendance: 10,279; Referee: Li Haihe |

| 31 August 2014 23 | Shanghai Greenland Shenhua | 1–1 | Shanghai SIPG | Shanghai |
| 19:45 (UTC+08) | Shouting (yellow card) 10'; Kun 38' | Summary | Zhengrong 66'; Addo (yellow card) 89' | Stadium: Hongkou Football Stadium; Attendance: 22,375; Referee: Wang Zhe |

| 14 September 2014 24 | Guangzhou R&F | 4–0 | Shanghai Greenland Shenhua | Guangzhou |
| 19:30 (UTC+08) | Samuel 8', 83'; Park (yellow card) 15'; Miao (yellow card) 37'; Davi 39'; Hamdallah 70' | Summary | Shouting (yellow card) 72' (yellow-red card) 87' | Stadium: Yuexiushan Stadium; Attendance: 11,273; Referee: Zhou Gang |

| 20 September 2014 25 | Shanghai Greenland Shenhua | 1–0 | Guizhou Moutai | Shanghai |
| 19:45 (UTC+08) | Henrique 23'; Jiajun (yellow card) 37'; Shengjiong (yellow card) 89'; Cho (yellow card) 90+1' | Summary | Hanke (yellow card) 8'; Salley (yellow card) 69'; Jie (yellow card) 76' | Stadium: Hongkou Football Stadium; Attendance: 13,902; Referee: Xu Fuxin |

| 27 September 2014 26 | Shandong Luneng | 2–0 | Shanghai Greenland Shenhua | Jinan |
| 19:30 (UTC+08) | Binbin 8'; Love (yellow card) 52'; Aloísio 64'; McGowan (yellow card) 85' | Summary | Lingjiang (yellow card) 75' | Stadium: Jinan Olympic Sports Center Stadium; Attendance: 20,207; Referee: Ma Li |

| 4 October 2014 27 | Shanghai Greenland Shenhua | 2–1 | Harbin Yiteng | Shanghai |
| 19:45 (UTC+08) | Kaimu (yellow card) 2'; Henrique 78', 88' (yellow card) 90+5' | Summary | Rodrigo (yellow card) 11'; Fofo (yellow card) 13'; Tao (yellow card) 22'; Dori (yellow card) 28' (red card) 29'; Steer 66' | Stadium: Hongkou Football Stadium; Attendance: 12,513; Referee: Hai Tan |

| 18 October 2014 28 | Jiangsu Guoxin-Sainty | 1–1 | Shanghai Greenland Shenhua | Nanjing |
| 19:35 (UTC+08) | Hao 7' (yellow card) 25'; Elias (yellow card) 56' | Summary | Yunding (yellow card) 35'; Shouting (yellow card) 49'; Lingjiang (yellow card) 53'; Moreno 61' | Stadium: Nanjing Olympic Sports Centre; Attendance: 29,217; Referee: Zhao Zhizhi |

| 26 October 2014 29 | Shanghai Greenland Shenhua | 2–5 | Tianjin Teda | Shanghai |
| 14:35 (UTC+08) | Shouting (yellow card) 41'; Moreno 43' (yellow card) 84'; Henrique (yellow card) 56' (goal) 64'; Jiawei (yellow card) 70' | Summary | Benjian (yellow card) 8'; Andrezinho 24', 86', 89'; Zhenyu (yellow card) 28'; Baré 36'; Valencia 89' | Stadium: Hongkou Football Stadium; Attendance: 13,865; Referee: Wang Zhe |

| 2 November 2014 30 | Liaoning Whowin | 1–1 | Shanghai Greenland Shenhua | Panjin |
| 15:35 (UTC+08) | Yusong 7'; Shilin (yellow card) 46'; Mitchell (yellow card) 72' | Summary | Hao 46' (o.g.); Viatri (yellow card) 46'; Moreno (yellow card) 72' | Stadium: Liaoning Panjin Stadium; Attendance: 10,279; Referee: Li Haihe |

==== Table ====
| Pos | Team | Pld | W | D | L | GF | GA | GD | Pts |
|---|---|---|---|---|---|---|---|---|---|
| 7 | Tianjin TEDA | 30 | 10 | 9 | 11 | 41 | 44 | −3 | 39 |
| 8 | Jiangsu Sainty | 30 | 9 | 10 | 11 | 37 | 45 | −8 | 37 |
| 9 | Shanghai Greenland Shenhua | 30 | 8 | 11 | 11 | 33 | 45 | −12 | 35 |
| 10 | Liaoning Whowin | 30 | 8 | 9 | 13 | 33 | 48 | −15 | 33 (Note: Shanghai S. 0–0 Liaoning; Liaoning 3–0 Shanghai S.) |
| 11 | Shanghai Shenxin | 30 | 9 | 6 | 15 | 26 | 42 | −16 | 33 |

Source: Chinese Super League (in Chinese)
Rules for classification: 1st points; 2nd head-to-head points; 3rd head-to-head goal difference; 4th head-to-head goals scored; 5th reserve league points; 6th goal difference; 7th goals scored; 8th disciplinary points (1 point for each yellow card, 3 points for each red card).

=== Chinese FA Cup ===
| 15 July 2014 Third round | Chongqing Lifan | 0–3 | Shanghai Greenland Shenhua | Chongqing |
| 19:30 | | [ Summary] | Viatri 66', 70'; Gao Di 86' | Stadium: Fuling Stadium; Attendance: 8,118; Referee: Wang Jin |

| 23 July 2014 Fourth round | Yanbian Baekdu | 1–2 | Shanghai Greenland Shenhua | Yanji |
| 15:30 | Li Chenglin 65' | [ Summary] | Moreno 25'; Wang Fei 71' | Stadium: Yanji City Stadium; Attendance: 3,451; Referee: Fan Qi |

| 6 August 2014 Fifth round | Shanghai Greenland Shenhua | 4–2 | Shanghai Shenxin | Shanghai |
| 19:45 | Moreno 35', 81'; Henrique 50', 60' | [ Summary] | Utaka 7', 66' | Stadium: Hongkou Football Stadium; Attendance: 11,753; Referee: Wang Zhe |

| 1 October 2014 Semi-Final 1st leg | Shanghai Greenland Shenhua | 0–2 | Jiangsu Guoxin-Sainty | Shanghai |
| 19:45 | | [ Summary] | Wu Xi 40'; Sun Ke 41' | Stadium: Hongkou Football Stadium; Attendance: 16,258; Referee: Wang Jin |

| 23 October 2014 Semi-Final 2nd leg | Jiangsu Guoxin-Sainty | 3–0 (5–0 agg.) | Shanghai Greenland Shenhua | Nanjing |
| 19:35 | Sun Ke 58'; Wu Xi 84'; Toloza 90' | [ Summary] | | Stadium: Nanjing Olympic Sports Center; Attendance: 32,643; Referee: Shi Zhenlu |

== Squad statistics ==
=== Appearances and goals ===
| No. | Pos | Nat | Player | Total | | Super League | | FA Cup | |
| No. | Pos | Nat | Player | Apps | Goals | Apps | Goals | Apps | Goals |
|---|---|---|---|---|---|---|---|---|---|
| 1 | GK | (China) CHN | Geng Xiaofeng | 11 | 0 | 11 | 0 | 0 | 0 |
| 5 | DF | (South Korea) KOR | Cho Byung-Kuk | 29 | 0 | 29 | 0 | 0 | 0 |
| 6 | DF | (China) CHN | Li Wenbo | 14 | 0 | 13+1 | 0 | 0 | 0 |
| 7 | MF | (China) CHN | Wang Changqing | 18 | 0 | 14+4 | 0 | 0 | 0 |
| 8 | MF | (China) CHN | Fan Lingjiang | 17 | 0 | 11+6 | 0 | 0 | 0 |
| 10 | MF | (Colombia) COL | Giovanni Moreno | 28 | 8 | 28 | 8 | 0 | 0 |
| 12 | DF | (China) CHN | Bai Jiajun | 21 | 0 | 21 | 0 | 0 | 0 |
| 13 | DF | (Brazil) BRA | Paulo André | 23 | 0 | 22+1 | 0 | 0 | 0 |
| 15 | MF | (China) CHN | Zhan Yilin | 20 | 0 | 11+9 | 0 | 0 | 0 |
| 16 | MF | (China) CHN | Wang Fei | 8 | 1 | 1+7 | 1 | 0 | 0 |
| 17 | MF | (Chinese Taipei) TPE | Chen Po-liang | 12 | 0 | 2+10 | 0 | 0 | 0 |
| 18 | FW | (China) CHN | Gao Di | 21 | 5 | 20+1 | 5 | 0 | 0 |
| 19 | DF | (China) CHN | Zheng Kaimu | 16 | 0 | 6+10 | 0 | 0 | 0 |
| 20 | MF | (China) CHN | Xu Liang | 23 | 3 | 22+1 | 3 | 0 | 0 |
| 21 | MF | (China) CHN | Jiang Kun | 19 | 2 | 13+6 | 2 | 0 | 0 |
| 22 | GK | (China) CHN | Qiu Shengjiong | 18 | 0 | 18 | 0 | 0 | 0 |
| 24 | GK | (China) CHN | Shen Jun | 1 | 0 | 1 | 0 | 0 | 0 |
| 26 | MF | (China) CHN | Liang Yu | 1 | 0 | 0+1 | 0 | 0 | 0 |
| 28 | MF | (China) CHN | Cao Yunding | 28 | 1 | 24+4 | 1 | 0 | 0 |
| 30 | DF | (China) CHN | Tao Jin | 2 | 0 | 2 | 0 | 0 | 0 |
| 31 | FW | (Brazil) BRA | Paulo Henrique | 13 | 6 | 11+2 | 6 | 0 | 0 |
| 34 | FW | (Argentina) ARG | Lucas Viatri | 12 | 4 | 7+5 | 4 | 0 | 0 |
| 36 | MF | (China) CHN | Wang Shouting | 27 | 0 | 27 | 0 | 0 | 0 |
| 57 | MF | (China) CHN | Liu Jiawei | 3 | 0 | 3 | 0 | 0 | 0 |
Players who away from the club on loan:
| 2 | DF | (China) CHN | Xiong Fei | 1 | 0 | 0+1 | 0 | 0 | 0 |
Players who appeared for Shanghai Greenland Shenhua who left during the season:
| 9 | FW | (Colombia) COL | Luis Carlos Ruiz | 9 | 1 | 7+2 | 1 | 0 | 0 |
| 11 | FW | (Syria) SYR | Firas Al-Khatib | 12 | 1 | 6+6 | 1 | 0 | 0 |

=== Goal scorers ===
| Place | Position | Nation | Number | Name | Super League | FA Cup | Total |
|---|---|---|---|---|---|---|---|
| 1 | MF | (Colombia) | 10 | Giovanni Moreno | 8 | 3 | 11 |
| 2 | MF | (Brazil) | 31 | Paulo Henrique | 6 | 2 | 8 |
| 3 | FW | (China) | 18 | Gao Di | 5 | 1 | 6 |
| 3 | FW | (Argentina) | 32 | Lucas Viatri | 4 | 2 | 6 |
| 5 | MF | (China) | 20 | Xu Liang | 3 | 0 | 3 |
| 6 | MF | (China) | 21 | Jiang Kun | 2 | 0 | 2 |
| 6 | MF | (China) | 16 | Wang Fei | 1 | 1 | 2 |
| 8 | MF | (China) | 28 | Cao Yunding | 1 | 0 | 1 |
| 8 | FW | (Colombia) | 9 | Luis Carlos Ruiz | 1 | 0 | 1 |
| 8 | FW | (Syria) | 11 | Firas Al-Khatib | 1 | 0 | 1 |
| 8 | | | | Own goal | 1 | 0 | 1 |
| | | | | TOTALS | 33 | 9 | 42 |
