= 2011–12 Perth Glory FC season =

Perth Glory FC
2011–12 season
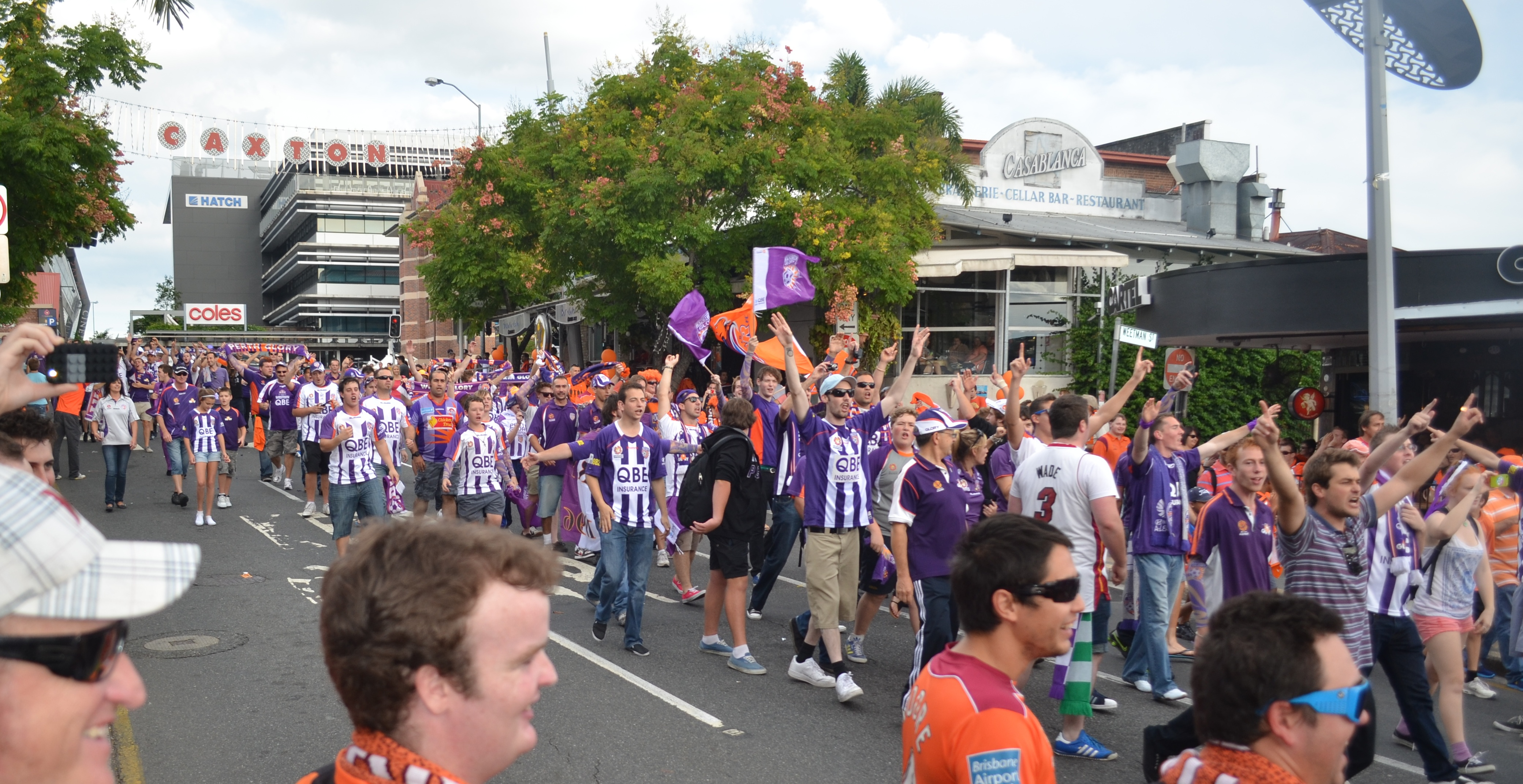
- Glory fans prior to the 2012 A-League Grand Final
- Chairman: Tony Sage
- Manager: Ian Ferguson
- A-League: 3rd
- A-League Finals Series: Runners-up
- Top goalscorer: League: Shane Smeltz – 13; All: Shane Smeltz – 17
- Highest home attendance: 12,358(regular season) v Melbourne; 22 January 2012
- Lowest home attendance: 6,484 v Gold Coast; 3 December 2011
- Average home league attendance: 8,320
Home colours	Away colours	Third colours

The 2011–12 Perth Glory FC season was the club's 15th season since its establishment in 1996. The club competed in the A-League for the 7th time. The club participated in its first A-League Grand Final this season, its 5th overall.

== Players ==
=== First team squad ===
Note: Flags indicate national team as defined under FIFA eligibility rules; some limited exceptions apply. Players may hold more than one non-FIFA nationality.

No.	Pos.	Nation	Player
1	GK	AUS	Danny Vukovic
2	DF	AUS	Josh Mitchell
3	DF	NED	Bas van den Brink
4	FW	IRL	Billy Mehmet
5	DF	AUS	Steve Pantelidis
6	DF	AUS	Chris Coyne (Vice-Captain)
7	MF	AUS	Jacob Burns (Captain)
8	MF	AUS	Adam Hughes
9	FW	NZL	Shane Smeltz
10	MF	IRL	Liam Miller
11	MF	NED	Victor Sikora
12	DF	AUS	Scott Neville

No.	Pos.	Nation	Player
13	MF	AUS	Travis Dodd
14	MF	SCO	Steven McGarry
15	FW	AUS	Tommy Amphlett
16	MF	AUS	Evan Berger
17	MF	AUS	Todd Howarth
18	FW	AUS	Jesse Makarounas (Youth)
19	DF	AUS	Joshua Risdon (Youth)
20	GK	AUS	Neil Young
22	FW	AUS	Adam Taggart (Youth)
26	MF	AUS	Brandon O'Neill (Youth)
27	MF	BRA	Andrezinho (Injury Replacement)
35	DF	AUS	Dean Heffernan

=== Transfers ===
In: Note: Flags indicate national team as defined under FIFA eligibility rules; some limited exceptions apply. Players may hold more than one non-FIFA nationality.

No.	Pos.	Nation	Player
—	DF	AUS	Dean Heffernan (from (Australia) Melbourne Heart)
1	GK	AUS	Danny Vukovic (from (New Zealand) Wellington Phoenix)
3	DF	NED	Bas van den Brink (from (South Korea) Busan I'Park)
4	FW	IRL	Billy Mehmet (from (Turkey) Samsunspor)
5	DF	AUS	Steve Pantelidis (from (Indonesia) Bintang Medan)
8	MF	AUS	Adam Hughes (from (Australia) Adelaide United)
9	FW	NZL	Shane Smeltz (from (Australia) Gold Coast United)
10	MF	IRL	Liam Miller (from (Scotland) Hibernian)
13	DF	AUS	Travis Dodd (from (Australia) Adelaide United)
16	DF	AUS	Evan Berger (from (Australia) Melbourne Victory)
18	FW	AUS	Jesse Makarounas (from (Australia) Australian Institute of Sport)
20	GK	AUS	Neil Young (from (Australia) Newcastle United Jets)
27	MF	BRA	Andrezinho (from (Japan) Consadole Sapporo)
35	DF	AUS	Dean Heffernan (from (China) Liaoning Whowin)

Out: Note: Flags indicate national team as defined under FIFA eligibility rules; some limited exceptions apply. Players may hold more than one non-FIFA nationality.

No.	Pos.	Nation	Player
—	MF	AUS	Andrija Jukic (to (Indonesia) Bogor Raya FC)
—	MF	AUS	Howard Fondyke (released)
—	DF	AUS	Naum Sekulovski (released)
—	DF	AUS	Brent Griffiths (to (Australia) Stirling Lions)
—	FW	AUS	Anthony Skorich (released)
—	DF	AUS	Jamie Coyne (to (Australia) Sydney FC)
—	DF	ENG	Andy Todd (to (England) Oldham Athletic)
—	DF	AUS	Dean Heffernan (to (China) Liaoning Whowin)
—	FW	AUS	Michael Baird (to (Australia) Central Coast Mariners)
—	GK	AUS	Aleks Vrteski (to (Indonesia) Solo FC)
—	MF	AUS	Adriano Pellegrino (to (Australia) Central Coast Mariners)
—	FW	ENG	Robbie Fowler (to (Thailand) Muangthong United)
—	FW	SRB	Branko Jelic (released)
—	MF	AUS	Cameron Edwards (to (England) Reading)
21	MF	AUS	Mile Sterjovski (to (China) Dalian Aerbin)

== Matches ==
=== 2011–12 Pre-season friendlies ===
25 June 2011	Perth Glory (Australia)	3 – 1	(Australia) Bunbury Forum Force	Hay Park, Bunbury
	Taggart 43'; Dodd 54'; Amphlett 90'		48' Fontanille	Attendance: 1,500

5 July 2011	Perth Glory (Australia)	9 – 4	(Western Australia) WA State Team	Dorrien Gardens
	Dodd 19', 45'; McGarry 24'; Risdon 56'; Vittiglia 57', 79'; Taggart (?); Amphlett 90'	Report	Morgan 30'; Pritchard 63'; Barlow (?); Kay (?)	Attendance: 1,589; Referee: David Costello

9 July 2011	Perth Glory (Australia)	0 – 2	(Scotland) Celtic	Nib Stadium, Perth
		Report	Hooper 16'; Mulgrew 51'	Attendance: 15,350; Referee: Peter Green

3 August 2011 South African tour	Platinum Stars (South Africa)	1 – 0	(Australia) Perth Glory	Royal Bafokeng Stadium, Phokeng
		Report

6 August 2011 South African tour	AmaZulu (South Africa)	1 – 3	(Australia) Perth Glory	Moses Mabhida Stadium, Durban
		[ Report]

23 August 2011	Perth Glory (Australia)	1 – 1	(United Arab Emirates) Al-Ahli	Nib Stadium, Perth
	Burns 41'	Report	Grafite 90+3'	Referee: (Australia) David Costello

3 September 2011	Bayswater City (Australia)	0 – 3	(Australia) Perth Glory	Frank Drago Reserve, Bayswater
	Taggart 43'; Dodd 54'; Amphlett 90'		Fontanille 48'

7 September 2011	Stirling Lions (Australia)	0 – 2	(Australia) Perth Glory	Macedonia Park, Stirling
	19:00	Report	Smeltz 56', 67'

10 September 2011	Balcatta (Australia)	1 – 6	(Australia) Perth Glory	McGillivray Oval, Mt Claremont
13:00	Lowry 31' (o.g.)	Report	Amphlett 13'; Sterjovski 20'; Mehmet 22'; Hughes 37'; Taggart 85'

13 September 2011	Perth Glory (Australia)	2 – 1	(United Arab Emirates) UAE U23's	AK Reserve, Mt Claremont
19:00	Taggart 8'; Dodd 63'	Report	Mabkhot 35'	Attendance: 600; Referee: Matthew Cheeseman

18 September 2011	Central Coast Mariners (Australia)	1 – 0	(Australia) Perth Glory	Knox Grammar School, Wahroonga
14:00		Report		Attendance: 5000

24 September 2011	Sydney FC (Australia)	2 – 2	(Australia) Perth Glory	Jubilee Oval, Carlton
15:00		[ Report]		Attendance: 3539

=== 2011–12 Hyundai A-League ===
==== Results by round ====
Round	1	2	3	4	5	6	7	8	9	10	11	12	13	14	15	16	17	18	19	20	21	22	23	24	25	26	27
Ground	H	A	H	A	A	H	A	A	H	A	H	H	A	H	A	A	A	H	A	H	A	H	H	A	H	A	H
Result	W	W	W	L	L	L	D	L	W	L	L	L	D	D	W	W	D	W	W	W	L	W	L	W	W	L	W
Position	2	2	2	2	3	3	4	5	5	7	8	7	7	9	7	5	5	5	4	4	4	4	4	3	3	3	3

Source: Matches
A = Away; H = Home; W = Win; D = Draw; L = Loss

==== Results summary ====
Overall								Home						Away					
Pld	W	D	L	GF	GA	GD	Pts	W	D	L	GF	GA	GD	W	D	L	GF	GA	GD
27	13	4	10	40	35	+5	43	8	1	3	24	12	+12	5	3	7	16	23	−7

==== Fixtures & Results ====
9 October 2011 Round 1	Perth Glory	1 : 0	Adelaide United	nib Stadium, Perth
16:30 AWST	B. Mehmet 76'	Summary		Attendance: 9,452

16 October 2011 Round 2	Melbourne Heart	1 : 2	Perth Glory	AAMI Park, Melbourne
17:00 AEDT; 14:00 AWST	D. Williams 45'	Report	33', 66' S. Smeltz	Attendance: 7,229

23 October 2011 Round 3	Perth Glory	1 : 0	Wellington Phoenix	nib Stadium, Perth
16:30 AWST; 21:30 NZDT Perth Starting XI: 01 (Australia) GK Danny Vukovic; 03 (Netherlands) DF Bas van den Brink; 04 (Republic of Ireland) FW Billy Mehmet; 06 (Australia) DF Chris Coyne; 07 (Australia) MF Jacob Burns (c); 09 (New Zealand) FW Shane Smeltz; 10 (Republic of Ireland) MF Liam Miller (substituted off) 85'; 12 (Australia) DF Scott Neville; 13 (Australia) MF Travis Dodd (substituted off) 63'; 17 (Australia) MF Todd Howarth; 27 (Brazil) MF Andrezinho (substituted off) 73'; Substitutes: 30 (Australia) GK Lewis Italiano; 02 (Australia) DF Josh Mitchell (substituted on) 85'; 14 (Scotland) MF Steven McGarry (substituted on) 73'; 15 (Australia) FW Tommy Amphlett (substituted on) 63'	L. Miller (yellow card) 18'; S. Smeltz 32'; C. Coyne (yellow card) 82'	(1:0); Summary; 8 Shots 12; 5 Shots on Target 2; 13 Fouls Committed 12; 4 Corners 7; 4 Offsides 4; 48% Possession 52%	(yellow card) 7' B. Sigmund; (yellow card) 12' (yellow-red card) 90' M. Muscat; (yellow card) 32' Daniel	Attendance: 8,299; Referee: (Australia) Ben Williams Wellington Starting XI: 20 (Trinidad and Tobago) GK Tony Warner; 02 (Malta) DF Manny Muscat; 03 (New Zealand) DF Tony Lochhead; 07 (New Zealand) MF Leo Bertos; 09 (England) FW Chris Greenacre; 11 (New Zealand) MF Daniel (substituted off) 75'; 12 (Australia) MF Nick Ward; 18 (New Zealand) DF Ben Sigmund; 21 (Spain) MF Dani Sánchez; 22 (Australia) DF Andrew Durante (c); 24 (United States) ST Alex Smith; Substitutes: 01 (New Zealand) GK Mark Paston; 04 (Australia) DF Brent Griffiths; 13 (Australia) DF Nikolas Tsattalios (substituted on) 75'; 15 (New Zealand) MF Cameron Lindsay

29 October 2011 Round 4	Central Coast Mariners	2 : 1	Perth Glory	Bluetongue Stadium, Gosford
17:30 AEDT	M. Simon 27'; B. Ibini-Isei 45'	Report	6' T. Dodd	Attendance: 6,883

5 November 2011 Round 5	Newcastle Jets	2 : 0	Perth Glory	Ausgrid Stadium, Newcastle
17:30 AEDT	J. Brockie 10', 11'	Report		Attendance: 12,383

12 November 2011 Round 6	Perth Glory	0 : 1	Sydney FC	nib Stadium, Perth
19:00 AWST		Summary	45' Bridge; (yellow card) 76' S. Jamieson	Attendance: 9,046

20 November 2011 Round 7	Melbourne Victory	2 : 2	Perth Glory	Etihad Stadium, Melbourne
17:00 AEDT	C. Hernandez 52' (pen.); D. Allsopp 58'	Summary	(red card) 38' L. Miller; 71' Andrezinho; 86' S. Smeltz	Attendance: 18,404

26 November 2011 Round 8	Brisbane Roar	4 : 0	Perth Glory	Suncorp Stadium, Brisbane
18:45 AEST	B. Berisha 23', 45'; I. Nakajima-Farran 34', 42'	Summary		Attendance: 19,339

3 December 2011 Round 9	Perth Glory	2 : 0	Gold Coast United	nib Stadium, Perth
19:00 AWST	M. Sterjovski 23' (pen.); S. Smeltz 54' (pen.)	Summary	(yellow card) 19' (yellow-red card) 62' Anderson	Attendance: 6,484

10 December 2011 Round 10	Wellington Phoenix	1 : 0	Perth Glory	Westpac Stadium, Wellington
17:00 NZDT; 12:00 AWST Wellington Starting XI: 20 (Trinidad and Tobago) GK Tony Warner; 02 (Malta) MF Manny Muscat; 03 (New Zealand) DF Tony Lochhead (substituted off) 90'; 06 (New Zealand) MF Tim Brown; 07 (New Zealand) MF Leo Bertos; 08 (Barbados) FW Paul Ifill; 09 (England) FW Chris Greenacre (substituted off) 83'; 17 (Australia) MF Vince Lia; 18 (New Zealand) DF Ben Sigmund; 21 (Spain) MF Dani Sánchez (substituted off) 76'; 22 (Australia) DF Andrew Durante (c); Substitutes: 01 (New Zealand) GK Mark Paston; 11 (New Zealand) MF Daniel (substituted on) 90'; 12 (Australia) MF Nick Ward (substituted on) 83'; 14 (Australia) FW Mirjan Pavlovic (substituted on) 76'	P. Ifill (yellow card) 30'; T. Lochhead (yellow card) 31'; T. Brown (yellow card) 40'; B. Sigmund 85'; M. Pavlovic (red card) 90+4'	Summary; Report; 10 Shots 9; 5 Shots on Target 4; 18 Fouls Committed 13; 6 Corners 1; 0 Offsides 1; 55% Possession 45%	(yellow card) 64' T. Howarth; (yellow card) 88' J. Mitchell	Attendance: 6,020; Referee: (Australia) Ryan Shepheard Perth Starting XI: 01 (Australia) GK Danny Vukovic; 02 (Australia) DF Josh Mitchell; 03 (Netherlands) DF Bas van den Brink; 07 (Australia) MF Jacob Burns (c); 08 (Australia) MF Adam Hughes; 09 (New Zealand) FW Shane Smeltz; 10 (Republic of Ireland) MF Liam Miller; 17 (Australia) MF Todd Howarth; 21 (Australia) FW Mile Sterjovski (substituted off) 71'; 25 (Australia) DF Trent McClenahan (substituted off) 88'; 27 (Brazil) MF Andrezinho (substituted off) 77'; Substitutes: 30 (Australia) GK Lewis Italiano; 04 (Republic of Ireland) FW Billy Mehmet (substituted on) 77'; 05 (Australia) DF Steve Pantelidis (substituted on) 88'; 15 (Australia) FW Tommy Amphlett (substituted on) 71'

17 December 2011 Round 12	Perth Glory	1 : 2	Melbourne Heart	nib Stadium, Perth
19:00 AWST	M. Thompson 35'	Summary	33' B. Mehmet; 86' A. Behich	Attendance: 6,458

23 December 2011 Round 13	Perth Glory	1 : 3	Central Coast Mariners	nib Stadium, Perth
19:00 AWST; 22:00 AEDT	Mitchell (red card) 26'; McGarry 83'	Summary	Ibini-Isei 49'; Bojić 60'; Simon 64'

31 December 2011 Round 14	Newcastle Jets	1 : 1	Perth Glory	Ausgrid Stadium, Newcastle
16:00 AEDT	Jeffers 61'	Summary	Mehmet 9'; Mehmet (red card) 34'	Referee: Strebre Delovski

4 January 2012 Round 15	Perth Glory	3 : 3	Brisbane Roar	nib Stadium, Perth
19:00 AWST; 22:00 AEDT	Dodd 16'; Sterjovski 24', 79' (pen.)	Summary	Nichols 40', 69'; Paartalu 45'	Referee: Chris Beath

8 January 2012 Round 16	Wellington Phoenix	0 : 1	Perth Glory	Westpac Stadium, Wellington
16:00 NZDT		Summary	Mitchell 90+2'	Referee: Kristian Griffiths-Jones

15 January 2012 Round 17	Melbourne Heart	1 : 2	Perth Glory	AAMI Park, Melbourne
16:00 AEDT	Sarkies 66'	Summary	Smeltz 16'; McGarry 69'	Attendance: 7,233; Referee: Chris Beath

18 January 2012 (Note: Originally scheduled for 7 December, this match was postponed due to severe weather in Perth, stopping travel for Perth Glory.) Round 11	Sydney FC	1 : 1	Perth Glory	Campbelltown Stadium, Campbelltown
	Bridge 45+3'	Summary	Hughes 89'	Attendance: 5,505; Referee: Matthew Gillet

22 January 2012 Round 18	Perth Glory	4 : 1	Melbourne Victory	nib Stadium, Perth
16:30 AWST; 19:30 AEDT	Smeltz 14', 35' (pen.); Sterjovski 42' (pen.); Andrezinho 90'	Summary	Kewell 69' (pen.); Allsopp (red card) 78'	Attendance: 12,358

29 January 2012 Round 19	Adelaide United	0 : 3	Perth Glory	Hindmarsh Stadium, Adelaide
16:30 ACDT		Summary	Smeltz 14'; McGarry 20'; Miller 82'	Attendance: 9,063; Referee: Jarred Gillett

6 February 2012 Round 20	Perth Glory	4 : 0	Gold Coast United	nib Stadium, Perth
19:00 AWST	McGarry 18'; Miller 53'; Dodd 67'; Traoré 84' (o.g.)	Summary

11 February 2012 Round 21	Sydney FC	2 : 1	Perth Glory	Sydney Football Stadium, Sydney
19:45 AEDT	Emerton 53'; Cazarinet 72'	Summary	Mehmet 86'

18 February 2012 Round 22	Perth Glory	2 : 0	Newcastle Jets	nib Stadium, Perth
19:00 AWST	Hughes 15'; Mehmet 60'	Summary		Attendance: 8,108

25 February 2012 Round 23	Perth Glory	0 : 3	Brisbane Roar	nib Stadium, Perth
19:00 AWST		Summary	Henrique 21'; Berisha 59', 63'; Henrique (red card) 65'	Attendance: 10,367

4 March 2012 Round 24	Adelaide United	0 : 2	Perth Glory	Hindmarsh Stadium, Adelaide
16:30 ACDT	Barbiero (red card) 87'	Summary	Mehmet 6'; Burns 24'

11 March 2012 Round 25	Perth Glory	1 : 0	Central Coast Mariners	nib Stadium, Perth
16:30 AWST	Dodd 25'	Summary		Attendance: 6,502

18 March 2012 Round 26	Gold Coast United	3 : 0	Perth Glory	Skilled Park, Gold Coast
17:30 AEST	Anderson 4'; Brown 83', 90+3'	Summary	Heffernan (red card) 36'	Attendance: 1,720

24 March 2012 Round 27	Perth Glory	4 : 2	Melbourne Victory	nib Stadium, Perth
18:30 AWST	Smeltz 24', 48', 63' (pen.), 66'	Summary	Hernández 22'; Milligan 45+4'	Attendance: 9,724

Pos	Team	Pld	W	D	L	GF	GA	GD	Pts	Qualification
1	Central Coast Mariners	27	15	6	6	40	24	+16	51	Qualification for 2013 AFC Champions League group stage and finals series (Note: First place qualifies for the 2013 AFC Champions League group stage. Winning the 2012 A-League Grand Final automatically earns qualification for the 2013 AFC Champions League qualifying play-off, unless first place are champions.)
2	Brisbane Roar (C)	27	14	7	6	50	28	+22	49	Qualification for 2013 AFC Champions League qualifying play-off and finals series
3	Perth Glory	27	13	4	10	40	35	+5	43	Qualification for Finals series
4	Wellington Phoenix	27	12	4	11	34	32	+2	40	Qualification for Finals series
5	Sydney FC	27	10	8	9	37	42	−5	38	Qualification for Finals series
6	Melbourne Heart	27	9	10	8	35	34	+1	37	Qualification for Finals series
7	Newcastle Jets	27	10	5	12	38	41	−3	35	
8	Melbourne Victory	27	6	11	10	35	43	−8	29	
9	Adelaide United	27	5	10	12	26	44	−18	25	
10	Gold Coast United	27	4	9	14	30	42	−12	21	

Source: ultimatealeague.com
Rules for classification: 1) points; 2) goal difference; 3) number of goals scored.
(C) Champions

== 2011–12 Finals Series ==
1 April 2012 Semi-Final 3 v 6	Perth Glory	3 : 0	Melbourne Heart	Perth
17:00 AWST (UTC+8)	Smeltz 65', 72', 90+1'	Summary	Srhoj (yellow card) 15'	Stadium: nib Stadium, Perth; Attendance: 12,600; Referee: Jarred Gillett

7 April 2012 Minor Semi-Final	Perth Glory	3 : 2 (a.e.t.)	Wellington Phoenix	Perth
17:30 AWST (UTC+8)	van den Brink 14'; Mehmet 72'; Howarth 113'	Summary	Greenacre 47'; Muscat 55'	Stadium: nib Stadium, Perth; Referee: Peter Green

14 April 2012 Preliminary final	Central Coast Mariners	1 : 1 (a.e.t.) (3 – 5 p)	Perth Glory	Gosford
16:00 AEST (UTC+10)	Kwasnik 34'	Report; Summary	Smeltz 37'	Stadium: Bluetongue Stadium,
	Penalties
	McBreen (penalty scored); Wilkinson (penalty scored); Ryan (penalty scored); McGlinchey (penalty missed)		(penalty scored) Smeltz; (penalty scored) Mehmet; (penalty scored) Miller; (penalty scored) Heffernan; (penalty scored) Burns

=== Grand Final ===
22 April 2012	Brisbane Roar	2 - 1	Perth Glory	Suncorp Stadium, Brisbane
16:00 AEST (UTC+10)	Berisha 84', 90+7' (pen)	Summary	Franjic 53' (o.g.); Heffernan (yellow card) 57' (yellow-red card) 90+1'	Attendance: 50,314; Referee: Jarred Gillett

== Statistics ==
=== Goal scorers ===
Rank	Player		Goals per Game																															
Rank	Player		1	2	3	4	5	6	7	8	9	10	11	12	13	14	15	16	17	18	19	20	21	22	23	24	25	26	27	FS-SF1	FS-SF2	FS-PF	Grand Final	Total
1	(New Zealand)	Shane Smeltz		2	1				1		1							1		2	1								4	3		1		17
2	(Republic of Ireland)	Billy Mehmet	1										1		1								1	1		1					1			7
3	(Scotland)	Steven McGarry												1				1			1	1												4
3	(Australia)	Mile Sterjovski									1					2				1														4
3	(Australia)	Travis Dodd				1										1						1					1							4
6	(Brazil)	Andrezinho							1											1														2
6	(Republic of Ireland)	Liam Miller																			1	1												2
6	(Australia)	Adam Hughes																	1					1										2
6		Own goal																				1											1	2
9	(Australia)	Josh Mitchell															1																	1
9	(Australia)	Jacob Burns																								1								1
9	(Netherlands)	Bas van den Brink																													1			1
9	(Australia)	Todd Howarth																								1					1			1

A goal was scored from a penalty kick
2 were scored from penalty kicks

=== Disciplinary record ===
No.	Position	Name	Yellow card	Yellow card Yellow card Red card	Red card
1	GK	(Australia) Danny Vukovic	3	0	0
2	DF	(Australia) Josh Mitchell	6	0	1
3	DF	(Netherlands) Bas van den Brink	4	0	0
4	FW	(Republic of Ireland) Billy Mehmet	4	0	1
5	DF	(Australia) Steve Pantelidis	7	0	0
6	DF	(Australia) Chris Coyne	3	0	0
7	MF	(Australia) Jacob Burns	9	0	0
8	DF	(Australia) Adam Hughes	1	0	0
9	FW	(Australia) Shane Smeltz	4	0	0
10	MF	(Republic of Ireland) Liam Miller	5	0	1
12	DF	(Australia) Scott Neville	1	0	0
13	MF	(Australia) Travis Dodd	1	0	0
17	MF	(Australia) Todd Howarth	4	0	0
19	DF	(Australia) Joshua Risdon	1	0	0
21	FW	(Australia) Mile Sterjovski	1	0	0
25	DF	(Australia) Trent McClenahan	1	0	0
26	MF	(Australia) Brandon O'Neill	1	0	0
27	MF	(Brazil) Andrezinho	1	0	0
35	DF	(Australia) Dean Heffernan	5	1	1
