= 2010–11 Perth Glory FC season =

Perth Glory FC
2010–11 season
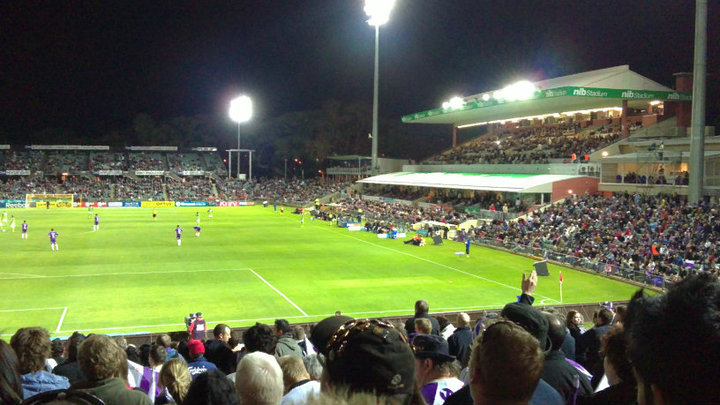
- Perth vs North Queensland
- Chairman: Tony Sage
- Manager: David Mitchell
- A-League: 10th
- Top goalscorer: Robbie Fowler – 9
- Highest home attendance: 16,019 v N. Queensland on 6 August 2010
- Lowest home attendance: 5,745 v Melbourne Heart on 3 November 2010
Home colours	Away colours

The 2010–11 Perth Glory FC season was the club's 14th season since its establishment in 1996. The club competed in the A-League for the 6th time.

== Players ==
=== First team squad ===
Note: Flags indicate national team as defined under FIFA eligibility rules; some limited exceptions apply. Players may hold more than one non-FIFA nationality.

No.	Pos.	Nation	Player
1	GK	AUS	Tando Velaphi
2	DF	AUS	Josh Mitchell
3	DF	AUS	Jamie Coyne
4	DF	ENG	Andy Todd
5	DF	AUS	Jamie Harnwell
6	DF	AUS	Chris Coyne
7	MF	AUS	Jacob Burns
8	MF	NED	Victor Sikora
9	FW	ENG	Robbie Fowler
10	FW	AUS	Michael Baird
11	FW	SRB	Branko Jelic
12	DF	AUS	Scott Neville

No.	Pos.	Nation	Player
13	FW	AUS	Tommy Amphlett
14	MF	SCO	Steven McGarry
15	MF	AUS	Howard Fondyke
16	MF	AUS	Adriano Pellegrino
17	MF	AUS	Todd Howarth
18	DF	AUS	Brent Griffiths
19	DF	AUS	Naum Sekulovski
20	GK	AUS	Alex Pearson
21	FW	AUS	Mile Sterjovski
22	FW	AUS	Anthony Skorich
23	MF	AUS	Andrija Jukic

== Squad changes for 2010-11 season ==
=== In ===
Date	Pos.	Name	From	Fee	Ref.
15 April 2010	DF	(Australia) Josh Mitchell	(Romania) Universitatea Craiova	Free	
15 April 2010	FW	(Australia) Michael Baird	(Romania) Universitatea Craiova	Free	
27 April 2010	FW	(England) Robbie Fowler	(Australia) North Queensland Fury	Free	

=== Out ===
Date	Pos.	Name	To	Fee	Ref.
2 March 2010	FW	(Australia) Daniel McBreen	(Australia) Central Coast Mariners	Free	
5 March 2010	MF	(Australia) Chris Coyne	(China) Liaoning Hongyun	Loan	
6 March 2010	MF	(Australia) Wayne Srhoj	(Australia) Melbourne Heart	Free	
March 2010	MF	(Australia) Scott Bulloch	(Australia) Dandenong Thunder	Free	
March 2010	MF	(Australia) Ludovic Boi	(Australia) Stirling Macedonia	Free	

=== Mid-Season Gains ===
Date	Pos.	Name	From	Fee	Ref.
26 December 2010	MF	(Australia) Chris Coyne	(China) Liaoning Hongyun	Loan return	

=== Mid-Season Losses ===
Date	Pos.	Name	To	Fee	Ref.
10 December 2010	GK	(Australia) Aleks Vrteski	(Indonesia) Persis Solo	Free	
6 January 2011	FW	(Australia) Michael Baird	(Australia) Central Coast Mariners	Free	
7 January 2011	FW	(Australia) Andrija Jukic	(Indonesia) Bogor Raya FC	Free	
20 January 2011	FW	(England) Andy Todd	(England) Oldham Athletic	Free	

== Matches ==
=== 2010–11 pre-season friendlies ===
15 June 2010	Perth Glory (Australia)	8–0	(Australia) Rockingham City FC	Lark Hill Sportsplex, Perth
	B. Jelic; J. Makarounas; R. Fowler; M. Baird; S. McGarry; Ghanzali

19 June 2010	Perth Glory (Australia)	3–1	(Australia) Gold Coast United	Boomerang Oval, Newman
	M. Sterjovski 24' (pen.); A. Skorich 26'; J. Makarounas 71'	Report	83' B. Halloran

18 July 2010	Armadale SC (Australia)	1–2	(Australia) Perth Glory	Alfred Skeet Reserve, Armadale
	J. Goodwin 19'		55' B. Jelic; 80' J. Harnwell

23 July 2010	Adelaide United (Australia)	1–3	(Australia) Perth Glory	Hindmarsh Stadium, Adelaide
	S. van Dijk 77'	Report	17' B. Jelic; 86' 89' M. Baird	Attendance: 1,833

28 July 2010	WA State Team (Western Australia)	1–3	(Australia) Perth Glory	E&D Litis Stadium, Mount Hawthorn
	A. Oliveria 73'	Report	45' M. Sterjovski; 90+1' R. Vittiglia; 90+2' S. Neville	Attendance: 3,121; Referee: Matthew Cheeseman

=== 2010–11 Hyundai A-League fixtures ===
6 August 2010	Perth Glory	3–3	North Queensland Fury	nib Stadium, Perth
	B. Jelic 5'; J. Burns (yellow card) 25'; N. Sekulovski (yellow card) 65'; S. Neville 73'; M. Sterjovski (yellow card) 29' (goal) 79'	(1–1) report summary	(yellow card) 24' E. Akoto; (yellow card) 33' S. Storey; 35' C. Payne; (yellow card) 45+2' M. Hughes; 64' D. Williams; 90+1' C. Grossman	Attendance: 16,019; Referee: Kevin Docherty

14 August 2010	Melbourne Victory	0–2	Perth Glory	AAMI Park, Melbourne
	G. Brebner (yellow card) 37'	(0–1) report summary	23' J. Harnwell; (yellow card) 44' S. Neville; 49' M. Sterjovski	Attendance: 17,566; Referee: Gerard Parsons

21 August 2010	Perth Glory	1–0	Newcastle Jets	nib Stadium, Perth
	S. Neville (yellow card) 29'; B. Jelic 45'; J. Burns (yellow card) 59'	(1–0); Report; Summary	(yellow card) 43' R. Zadkovich	Attendance: 12,031; Referee: Matthew Breeze

29 August 2010	Melbourne Heart	2–2	Perth Glory	AAMI Park, Melbourne
	G. Sibon 5' (pen.); N. Kalmar 37'	(2–1); Summary	19' (o.g.) Marrone; 90+4' (pen.) Fowler	Attendance: 5,878; Referee: Kurt Ams

5 September 2010	Perth Glory	2–1	Wellington Phoenix	nib Stadium, Perth
15–00 AEST; 19–00 NZST	M. Sterjovski 6' (yellow card) 25'; R. Fowler 61'	(1–0); Report; Summary; Highlights; 13 Shots 15; 5 Shots on Target 7; 14 Fouls Committed 17; 6 Corners 4; 6 Offsides 0; 48% Possession 52%	(yellow card) 45' Daniel; 71' (yellow card) 79' B. Sigmund; (yellow card) 80' T. Hearfield	Attendance: 10,844; Referee: Ben Williams

12 September 2010	Perth Glory	0–1	Gold Coast United	nib Stadium, Perth
	M. Sterjovski (yellow card) 55'	(0–1); Report; Summary	23' J. Culina; (yellow card) 34' S. Fitzsimmons; (yellow card) 36' M. Thwaite	Attendance: 10,450; Referee: Matthew Breeze

17 September 2010	Newcastle Jets	2–0	Perth Glory	EnergyAustralia Stadium, Newcastle
	M. Bridges 10'; Z. Shuo (yellow card) 45+2'; R. Zadkovich (yellow card) 58'; L. Haliti 89' (yellow card) 89'	(1–0); Report; Summary	(yellow card) 25' J. Burns	Attendance: 6,977; Referee: Ryan Shepheard

24 September 2010	Adelaide United	2–0	Perth Glory	Hindmarsh Stadium, Adelaide
	R. Cornthwaite (yellow card) 44'; P. Reid (yellow card) 65'; S. van Dijk 70' 73' (pen.)	(0–0); Summary	(yellow card) 73' T. Velaphi; (red card) 75' J. Coyne	Attendance: 13,310; Referee: Matthew Breeze

3 October 2010	Perth Glory	1–2	Brisbane Roar	nib Stadium, Perth
	S. Neville 6'; J. Burns (yellow card) 71'	(1–1); Summary	1' Reinaldo; 90+4' R. Visconte; (yellow card) 67' M. Nichols; (yellow card) 82' E. Paartalu	Attendance: 9,758; Referee: Ben Williams

15 October 2010	North Queensland Fury	2–1	Perth Glory	Dairy Farmers Stadium, Townsville
	C. Payne 16'; D. Williams 72'	(1–1); Summary	21' (yellow card) 85' M. Baird; (yellow card) 53' J. Coyne; (yellow card) 64' N. Sekulovski	Attendance: 4,011; Referee: Gerard Parsons

24 October 2010	Perth Glory	0–3	Sydney FC	nib Stadium, Perth
	A. Pellegrino (yellow card) 22'; J. Harnwell (yellow card) 31'; J. Burns (yellow card) 43'; M. Baird (yellow card) 53'; M. Sterjovski (yellow card) 90+3'	(0–1); Report; Summary	(yellow card) 12' S. Byun; 25' 82' B. Cazarine; (yellow card) 32' N. Carle; 53' A. Brosque	Attendance: 8,870; Referee: Ben Williams

30 October 2010	Central Coast Mariners	5–0	Perth Glory	Sydney Football Stadium, Sydney
	M. McGlinchey (yellow card) 33'; R. Griffiths 36'; M. Simon 59'; A. Kwasnik 77'; M. Lewis 86'; N. Sekulovski 90' (o.g.)	(1–0); Report; Summary		Attendance: 10,476; Referee: Ryan Shepheard

3 November 2010	Perth Glory	0–0	Melbourne Heart	nib Stadium, Perth
		(0–0); Report; Summary

7 November 2010	Perth Glory	0–1	Wellington Phoenix	nib Stadium, Perth
Round 13; 16–00 AWST; 21–00 NZDT	S. Neville (yellow card) 31'; J. Burns (yellow card) 33' (yellow-red card) 80'; B. Griffiths (yellow card) 64'; A. Todd (yellow card) 90+2'	(0–1); Report; Summary; 10 Shots 12; 5 Shots on Target 4; 18 Fouls Committed 12; 6 Corners 4; 1 Offsides 3; 51% Possession 49%	1' (yellow card) 44' T. Brown; (yellow card) 34' V. Lia; (yellow card) 68' S. Elliott; (yellow card) 70' M. Muscat; (yellow card) 90+1' A. Durante	Attendance: 6,676; Referee: Kris Griffiths-Jones

10 November 2010	Adelaide United	2–0	Perth Glory	Hindmarsh Stadium, Adelaide
Wednesday 18:30 CDT	Fyfe 64' van Dijk 90+1'	(0–0); Report; Summary	Sekulovski (yellow card) 45' (yellow-red card) 63'	Attendance: 10,023; Referee: Ryan Shepheard

14 November 2010	Perth Glory	3–1	Melbourne Victory	nib Stadium, Perth
Sunday 16–00 WST	Fowler 13', 64', 71'	(1–0); Report; Summary	Dugandžić 79'	Attendance: 6,217; Referee: Chris Beath

21 November 2010	Sydney FC	2–0	Perth Glory	Sydney Football Stadium, Sydney
Sunday 15–00 EDT	Cole 75'; A. Brosque 81'	(0–0); Report; Summary	B. Griffiths (red card) 90'	Attendance: 6,654; Referee: Peter Green

24 November 2010	Brisbane Roar	3–2	Perth Glory	Dairy Farmers Stadium, Townsville
Wednesday 20–00 EST	Solórzano 41', 76' (pen.); M. Smith 58'	(1–0); Report; Summary	Fowler 66' (pen.); Neville (yellow card) 70' (yellow-red card) 75'; Pellegrino 83'; Mitchell (red card) 90+2'	Attendance: 6,836; Referee: Matthew Gillett

28 November 2010	North Queensland Fury	1–1	Perth Glory	Suncorp Stadium, Brisbane
Sunday 17–00 EST	M. Hughes 80'	(0–1); Report; Summary	Fowler 23'; Sekulovski (yellow card) 38' (yellow-red card) 50'; B. Griffiths	Attendance: 4,491; Referee: Kris Griffiths-Jones

12 December 2010	Perth Glory	1–1	Central Coast Mariners	nib Stadium, Perth
Sunday 17–00 WST	Mitchell 4'	(1–0); Report; Summary	Zwaanswijk 87'	Attendance: 6,536; Referee: Gerard Parsons

18 December 2010	Melbourne Victory	2–0	Perth Glory	AAMI Park, Melbourne
Saturday 19–00 EDT	A. Thompson 45+4'; Vargas 64'	(1–0); Report; Summary		Attendance: 12,124; Referee: Matthew Breeze

22 December 2010	Perth Glory	4–2	Adelaide United	nib Stadium, Perth
Wednesday 19–00 WST	J. Coyne 6'; Sterjovski 35'; Fowler 67', 77' (pen.)	(2–1); Report; Summary	Keenan 22' van Dijk 51'; Cornthwaite (red card) 76'	Attendance: 7,193; Referee: Chris Beath

3 January 2011	Gold Coast United	0–0	Perth Glory	Skilled Park, Robina
Monday 18–00 EST		(0–0); Report; Summary		Attendance: 2,931; Referee: Peter O'Leary

7 January 2011	Brisbane Roar	1–1	Perth Glory	Suncorp Stadium, Brisbane
Friday 19:30 EST	Nichols 63'	Report; Summary	Sterjovski 31'	Attendance: 11,574; Referee: Jarred Gillett

15 January 2011	Perth Glory	1–1	Melbourne Heart	nib Stadium, Perth
Saturday 18:45 WST	Howarth 34'	Report; Summary	Alex 70'	Attendance: 7,962; Referee: Gerard Parsons

19 January 2011	Perth Glory	1–2	Central Coast Mariners	nib Stadium, Perth
Wednesday 19–00 WST	McGarry (yellow card) 18'; Velaphi (yellow card) 26'; Harnwell (red card); Howarth 38'; Pellegrino (yellow card) 58' (yellow-red card) 90+4'		Bojic (yellow card) 16'; McBreen 22'; Simon 23'; Griffiths (yellow card) 46'; Bozanic (yellow card) 50'	Referee: Ryan Shepheard

23 January 2011	Wellington Phoenix	4–0	Perth Glory	Westpac Stadium, Wellington
17–00 NZDT; 13–00 AWST	T. Velaphi 10' (o.g.); D. Macallister 49'; V. Lia 60'; C. Greenacre 90+1'	(1–0); Report; Summary; 18 Shots 11; 7 Shots on Target 3; 7 Fouls Committed 4; 11 Corners 2; 0 Offsides 1; 60% Possession 40%	(yellow card) 34' J. Mitchell	Attendance: 5,115; Referee: Peter O'Leary

29 January 2011	Perth Glory	0–2	Sydney FC	nib Stadium, Perth
Saturday 18:45 AWST		Summary	Carle 9'; Cazarine 54'	Attendance: 5,536; Referee: Gerard Parsons

6 February 2011	Perth Glory	1–2	Gold Coast United	nib Stadium, Perth
Sunday 17–00 WST	Taggart 75'	Report; Summary	Smeltz 33' (pen.), 55' (pen.)	Attendance: 6,617; Referee: Jarred Gillett

10 February 2011	Newcastle Jets	4–0	Perth Glory	EnergyAustralia Stadium, Newcastle
	Labinot Haliti 13'; Jeremy Brockie 54'; Sasho Petrovski 68' (pen.), 69'			Attendance: 7,286; Referee: Matthew Breeze

== A-League table ==
Pos	Team	Pld	W	D	L	GF	GA	GD	Pts	Qualification
1	Brisbane Roar (C)	30	18	11	1	58	26	+32	65	Qualification for 2012 AFC Champions League group stage and Finals series (Note: First place qualifies for the 2012 AFC Champions League group stage. Winning the 2011 A-League Grand Final automatically earns qualification for the 2012 AFC Champions League group stage, unless first place are champions. Second place qualifies for the 2012 AFC Champions League qualifying play-off, unless they qualify for the 2011 A-League Grand Final alongside first place or become A-League Champions, subsequently third place then qualify for the 2012 AFC Champions League qualifying play-off.)
2	Central Coast Mariners	30	16	9	5	50	31	+19	57	Qualification for 2012 AFC Champions League group stage and Finals series
3	Adelaide United	30	15	5	10	51	36	+15	50	Qualification for 2012 AFC Champions League qualifying play-off and Finals series
4	Gold Coast United	30	12	10	8	40	32	+8	46	Qualification for Finals series
5	Melbourne Victory	30	11	10	9	45	39	+6	43	Qualification for Finals series
6	Wellington Phoenix	30	12	5	13	39	41	−2	41	Qualification for Finals series
7	Newcastle Jets	30	9	8	13	29	33	−4	35	
8	Melbourne Heart	30	8	11	11	32	42	−10	35	
9	Sydney FC	30	8	10	12	35	40	−5	34	
10	Perth Glory	30	5	8	17	27	54	−27	23	
11	North Queensland Fury	30	4	7	19	28	60	−32	19	

Source: ultimatealeague.com
Rules for classification: 1) points; 2) goal difference; 3) number of goals scored.
(C) Champions

== Statistics ==
=== Goal scorers ===
Rank	Player		Goals per Round																														
Rank	Player		1	2	3	4	5	6	7	8	9	10	11	12	13	14	15	16	17	18	19	20	21	22	23	24	25	26	27	28	29	30	Total
1	(England)	Robbie Fowler				1	1											3		1	1			2									9
2	(Australia)	Mile Sterjovski	1	1			1																	1		1							5
3	(Serbia)	Branko Jelic	1		1																												2
3	(Australia)	Scott Neville	1								1																						2
3	(Australia)	Todd Howarth																										1	1				2
5	(Australia)	Michael Baird										1																					1
5	(Australia)	Adriano Pellegrino																		1													1
5	(Australia)	Jamie Harnwell		1																													1
5	(Australia)	Josh Mitchell																				1											1
5	(Australia)	Jamie Coyne																						1									1
5	(Australia)	Adam Taggart																													1		1

A goal was scored from a penalty kick
2 were scored from penalty kicks

=== Assists ===
Rank	Player	Pos.	League	Finals	Total
1	(Australia) Adriano Pellegrino	MF	4	0	4
2	(Australia) Todd Howarth	MF	2	0	2
2	(Australia) Mile Sterjovski	FW	2	0	2
4	(Australia) Michael Baird	FW	1	0	1
4	(Australia) Scott Neville	DF	1	0	1
4	(Australia) Anthony Skorich	FW	1	0	1
4	(Australia) Steven McGarry	MF	1	0	1

=== Disciplinary record ===
No.	Position	Name	Yellow card	Yellow card Yellow card Red card	Red card
7	DF	(Australia) Jacob Burns	7	0	1
19	DF	(Australia) Naum Sekulovski	4	1	1
18	DF	(Australia) Brent Griffiths	3	0	2
12	DF	(Australia) Scott Neville	5	0	1
21	FW	(Australia) Mile Sterjovski	5	0	0
3	DF	(Australia) Jamie Coyne	1	0	1
10	FW	(Australia) Michael Baird	3	0	0
4	DF	(England) Andy Todd	3	0	0
14	MF	(Scotland) Steven McGarry	3	0	0
1	GK	(Australia) Tando Velaphi	3	0	0
2	DF	(Australia) Josh Mitchell	0	0	1
16	MF	(Australia) Adriano Pellegrino	2	0	0
5	DF	(Australia) Jamie Harnwell	2	0	1
15	MF	(Australia) Howard Fondyke	2	0	0
9	FW	(England) Robbie Fowler	2	0	0
23	MF	(Australia) Andrija Jukic	1	0	0
