= Mile Sterjovski =

Australian soccer player (born 1979)

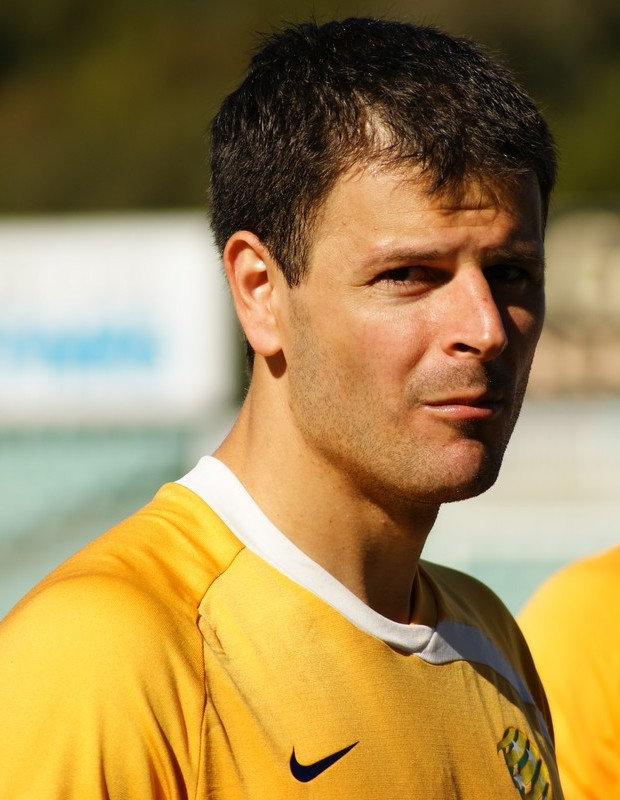
- Sterjovski in Australia training in 2008

Personal information
- Full name: Mile Sterjovski
- Date of birth: 27 May 1979 (age 47)
- Place of birth: Wollongong, New South Wales, Australia
- Height: 1.81 m (5 ft 11 in)
- Positions: Right winger; second striker

Youth career
- 1985–1988: Wollongong Olympic
- 1988–1993: Lake Heights FC
- 1993–1995: Wollongong Wolves
- 1996–1998: AIS

Senior career*
Years	Team	Apps	(Gls)
1995–1996	Wollongong Wolves	2	(0)
1997	Illawarra Lions	3	(3)
1997–1999	Sydney United	37	(20)
1999–2000	Parramatta Power	31	(11)
2000–2004	Lille	91	(15)
2004–2007	FC Basel	73	(31)
2007–2008	Hacettepe	24	(8)
2008–2009	Derby County	27	(2)
2009–2012	Perth Glory	63	(15)
2012	Dalian Aerbin	14	(0)
2012–2014	Central Coast Mariners	50	(4)
Total		415	(109)

International career
1998–1999	Australia U20	7	(3)
1998–2000	Australia U23	7	(0)
2000–2010	Australia	43	(8)

Managerial career
- 2020–2023: Bulls FC Academy
- 2023–2026: Macarthur FC
Medal record
Men's association football
Representing Australia
FIFA Confederations Cup
Third place	2001 Japan–South Korea
OFC Nations Cup
Winner	2004 Australia
OFC U-20 Championship
Winner	1998 Samoa
- * Club domestic league appearances and goals

Mile Sterjovski (Macedonian: Миле Стерјовски, pronounced [ˈmile ˈstɛr.jɔvs.ki]; born 27 May 1979) is an Australian former professional soccer player. He played predominantly as a right winger or as a second striker, but also played as a left winger and central midfielder. Sterjovski was most recently the head coach of A-League club Macarthur FC.

Sterjovski played youth football with Wollongong Wolves and the AIS before making his senior debut for Wolves in the National Soccer League. After also playing for Wollongong United, Sydney United and Parramatta Power, Sterjovski moved overseas to play for French club Lille OSC. He also spent time in Switzerland (with Basel) and Turkey (with Hacettepe) before joining Derby in the English Premier League. He eventually returned to Australia to play in the A-League for Perth Glory and Central Coast Mariners, separated by a period playing for Dalian Aerbin in the Chinese Super League. He then returned to the A-league to win the championship with the Central Coast Mariners.

He played for the Australia national team from 2000 to 2010, making 43 appearances and scoring 8 goals, including three games at the 2006 FIFA World Cup and an international hat-trick against Tahiti.

== Club career ==
=== Junior Club ===
Sterjovski began playing as a junior with the Wollongong Olympic Junior Soccer Club and Lake Height Junior Football Club.

=== Early career ===
Sterjovski began his career in Australia at Wollongong Wolves and briefly played for Illawarra Lions before making a name for himself with successful spells at Sydney United and Parramatta Power.

=== Lille ===
Sterjovski's performances and record of 31 goals in 68 games in three National Soccer League (NSL) seasons earned him a move to French Ligue 1 side Lille in 2000. After four seasons at Lille, Sterjovski moved to Swiss side FC Basel.

=== FC Basel ===
On 14 May 2004, it was announced that Sterjovski had signed a three-year contract with FC Basel. He joined Basel's first team during their 2004–05 season under head coach Christian Gross. After playing in five test games Sterjovski played his domestic league debut for his new club in the home game in the St. Jakob-Park on 17 July as Basel won 6–0 against Aarau. As reigning Swiss champions, Basel entered the 2004–05 UEFA Champions League in the third qualifying round and their aim was to reach the group stage. However, they were drawn against Internazionale. Sterjovski scored his first goal for his new club on 24 August in the away game in the San Siro, Milan, as Basel were defeated 4–1 by Inter and Inter won the qualifier 5–2 on aggregate. Basel subsequently dropped into the 2004–05 UEFA Cup. Beating Terek Grozny in the first round, Basel qualified for the group stage. A 1–1 draw away against Schalke 04 was followed by a home defeat against Hearts. But with two victories, 2–1 away against Ferencvárosi TC and 1–0 at home against Feyenoord, saw Basel rise to third place in the group table and advance to the knock-out stage. In the round of 32 in the 2004–05 UEFA Cup, a home game in the St. Jakob-Park on 17 February 2005, Basel played a goalless draw against Sterjovski's former club, Lille OSC, but in the return leg Basel were defeated 2–0 and were eliminated.

Sterjovski scored his first domestic league goal with his team in the home game on 7 November. It was the first goal of the game as Basel won 2–1 against Young Boys. Basel completed all the 2004–05 Super League season's seventeen home games undefeated, winning thirteen and drawing four. They ended the season as Swiss champions with ten points advantage over second placed Thun. In the first round of the 2004–05 Swiss Cup Basel played away against local amateur club FC Oberdorf. Sterjovski scored his first cup goal for the club in this match and Basel went on to win 4–0. In the second round they beat lower league team Meyrin 3–1. But in round three they faced Thun. Following a 1–1 draw after extra time. It required a penalty shoot-out. Sterjovski's spot kick was held by Thun keeper Fabio Coltorti and Thun won the shoot-out 4–3.

As Swiss champions, Basel entered the 2005–06 Champions League third qualifying round. However, they were drawn against Bundesliga club Werder Bremen and they lost 4–2 on aggregate. Subsequently Basel dropped into the 2005–06 UEFA Cup, where against Široki Brijeg in the first round, they sealed a 6–0 aggregate win to qualify for the Group stage. Here Basel were then drawn into Group E, alongside Strasbourg, Roma, Red Star Belgrade and Tromsø. Basel qualified for the knock-out stage and in the round of 32 Basel were drawn against AS Monaco, this was won 2–1 on aggregate. In the round of 16 Basel were drawn against Strasbourgh winning 4–2 on aggregate. In the quarter-finals, drawn against Middlesbrough they won the first leg 2–0, but Middlesbrough fought back to win the return match 4–1 and the tie 4–3 on aggregate. Sterjovski played in 11 of these 12 matches. Basel started into the 2005–06 Super League season well and led the championship right until the last day of the league campaign. On the final day of the league season Basel played at home against Zürich. Mladen Petrić had scored an equaliser after FCZ had taken an early lead. But then a last-minute goal from Zürich's Iulian Filipescu meant the final score was 2–1 in favour of the away team and it gave FCZ their first national championship since 1980–81. The title for Basel was lost on goal difference. The last minute loss of the Championship and the subsequent riots, the so-called Basel Hooligan Incident, meant that the club would suffer the consequences. In the first round of the 2005–06 Swiss Cup Basel played away against lower league team Solothurn and won this 4–1. In round two they played away against local lower league team Old Boys. In this game Sterjovski scored four goals and Basel won 6–1. However, Basel were defeated in the third-round home tie against FC Zürich 3–4.

FC Basel's European campaign started in the first qualifying stage of the 2006–07 UEFA Cup, here they beat Kazakh side FC Tobol 3–1 on aggregate. In the second qualifying round they were drawn against FC Vaduz from Liechtenstein, narrowly progressing on the away goals rule after a 2–2 aggregate draw. In the first round Basel won 7–2 on aggregate against FK Rabotnički to qualify for the group stage. Here Basel played their first match at home against Feyenoord, this ended in a 1–1 draw. Their second was away and FCB lost 3–0 against Blackburn Rovers. At home against AS Nancy the match was drawn 2–2 and the final game ended with a 3–1 defeat against Wisła Kraków. Basel ended the group stage in last position in the table and were eliminated. Sterjovski played in all ten of these European matches, scoring two goals. At the end of the 2006–07 Super League season Basel were runners-up, one point behind championship winners Zürich. In the Swiss Cup Basel advanced to the final, beating FC Liestal in the first round, Lugano, FC Baulmes, Aarau and Wil in the semi-final. In the final they played Luzern and won this 1–0 thanks to a penalty goal in the third minute of added time.

Sterjovski’s contract was not renewed and so he left the club. During his time with them, Sterjovski played a total of 171 games for Basel scoring a total of 38 goals. 93 of these games were in the Swiss Super League, 11 in the Swiss Cup, 30 in the UEFA competitions (Champions League and UEFA Cup) and 37 were friendly games. He scored 15 goals in the domestic league, seven in the cup, three in the European games and the other 13 were scored during the test games.

=== Gençlerbirliği ===
On 2 September 2007, Sterjovski scored on his debut after coming off the bench for his new club Gençlerbirliği OFTAŞ (now called Hacettepe Spor Kulübü) in their match against Fenerbahçe.

=== Derby County ===
On 9 January 2008, Sterjovski announced his plan to leave Turkey for personal reasons relating to his family. He announced that he was in negotiations with Premier League side Derby County and joined them after work permit problems on 24 January 2008. He made his debut as a substitute against Tottenham in a 3–0 defeat, and was a regular in the side towards the end of the season, usually playing out on the right wing.

In the 2008–09 season, Sterjovski was largely frozen out of the Derby squad by manager Paul Jewell, his first appearance of the season coming on 21 October 2008 against Blackpool, in which he scored his first goal for Derby. However, following Jewell's departure, he produced an impressive performance against Manchester United in the first leg of the League Cup semi-final under caretaker manager David Lowe. New Derby manager Nigel Clough was watching in the stands. Following the match, Sterjovski said: "Now I am glad there is a new manager. It’s a new start for me and, hopefully, I will get more chances." Sterjovski went on to make 14 further appearances before the end of the season, scoring once and playing well in the middle of the injury-hit Derby midfield.

=== Return to Australia: Perth Glory ===
After initial speculation linking Sterjovski with a move to Gold Coast United, he moved to Perth Glory on 11 June 2009 for an undisclosed fee on a three-year contract as their marquee player.

=== Central Coast Mariners ===
On 6 July 2012, it was announced he had signed one-year deal to play for Central Coast Mariners. On 5 February 2014, Sterjovski announced that he will retire at the end of the season.

== International career ==
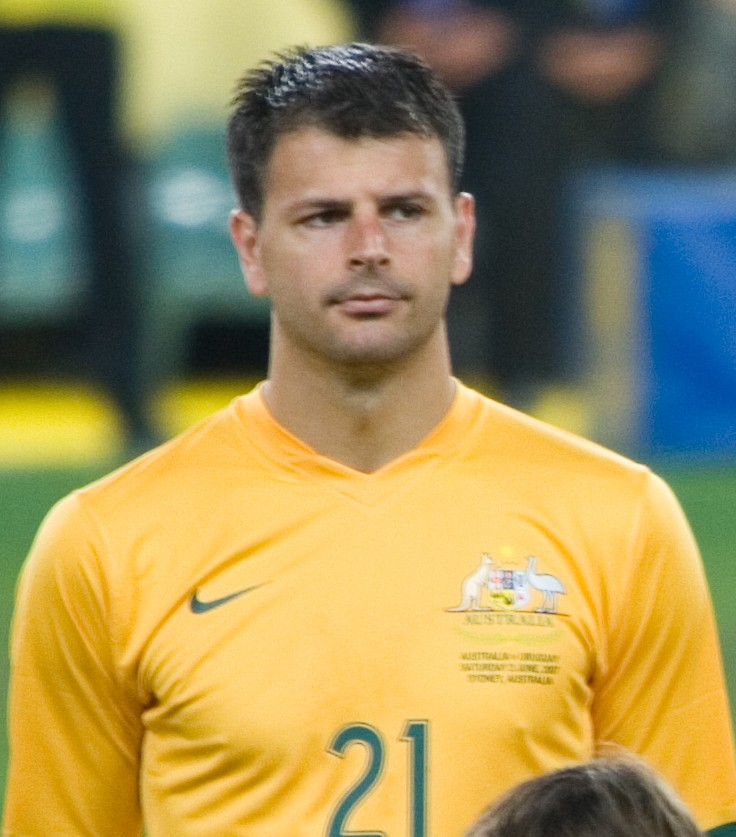
Sterjovski with Australia in 2007

Sterjovski made his Australia national team debut against Scotland in 2000. Sterjovski was selected to represent Australia at the 2006 FIFA World Cup in Germany. In the build-up, he made an appearance in the Australia vs. Greece friendly at the Melbourne Cricket Ground and also played against Liechtenstein, scoring the first goal for the Socceroos in a 3–1 win. In the finals he started in the games against Brazil and against Croatia.

Sterjovski was selected for the first group match in Australia's 2007 Asian Cup campaign, starting against Oman and substituted in the 46th minute, which Australia drew 1–1. Due to illness Sterjovski did not feature further in Australia's failed campaign in its first Asian Cup. Sterjovski scored against Ghana during a friendly match at the Sydney Football Stadium, but was sent off in the 85th minute after receiving a second yellow card for a tackle on Ghana's Richard Manu. He scored again on 20 August in a friendly against South Africa in which the Socceroos drew 2–2. On 10 June 2009, Sterjovski notched his 9th goal for Australia in a 2–0 win over Bahrain at the ANZ Stadium in Sydney, in his 41st appearance for his national side.

== Personal life ==
Sterjovski and his wife, Sharon, have three children — Luka, Sonny, and Lilly — all of whom have followed the family path into football. Sonny and Lilly currently represent the Bulls Academy in Macarthur FC’s men’s and women’s programs, while Luka plays his football with Hills United in NPL NSW League One.

== Career statistics ==
=== Club ===
Appearances and goals by club, season and competition
Club	Season	League			National cup (Note: Includes Chinese FA Cup.)		League cup (Note: Includes Chinese Super League Cup.)		Continental		Other		Total	
Club	Season	Division	Apps	Goals	Apps	Goals	Apps	Goals	Apps	Goals	Apps	Goals	Apps	Goals
Perth Glory	2009–10	A-League	22	6			–				1	0	23	6
Perth Glory	2010–11	A-League	23	5			–				–		23	5
Perth Glory	2011–12	A-League	17	4			–				0	0	17	4
Perth Glory	Total		62	15			0	0	0	0	1	0	63	15
Dalian Aerbin	2012	Chinese Super League	14	0	0	0					–		14	0
Central Coast Mariners	2012–13	A-League	19	1			–		5	0	2	0	26	1
Central Coast Mariners	2013–14	A-League	23	3			–		1	2	–		24	5
Central Coast Mariners	Total		42	4			0	0	1	2	2	0	45	6
Career total			118	19			0	0	6	2	3	0	127	21

=== International ===
Appearances and goals by national team and year
National team	Year	Apps	Goals
Australia	2000	1	0
Australia	2001	2	0
Australia	2002	0	0
Australia	2003	2	0
Australia	2004	10	3
Australia	2005	4	0
Australia	2006	9	1
Australia	2007	5	1
Australia	2008	6	2
Australia	2009	2	1
Australia	2010	2	0
Total		43	8

Scores and results list Australia's goal tally first, score column indicates score after each Sterjovski goal.

List of international goals scored by Mile Sterjovski
No.	Date	Venue	Opponent	Score	Result	Competition
1	31 May 2004	Hindmarsh Stadium, Adelaide, Australia	Tahiti	5–0	9–0	2004 OFC Nations Cup
2	31 May 2004	Hindmarsh Stadium, Adelaide, Australia	Tahiti	6–0	9–0	2004 OFC Nations Cup
3	31 May 2004	Hindmarsh Stadium, Adelaide, Australia	Tahiti	7–0	9–0	2004 OFC Nations Cup
4	7 June 2006	Donaustadion, Ulm, Germany	Liechtenstein	1–1	3–1	Friendly
5	2 June 2007	Stadium Australia, Sydney, Australia	Uruguay	1–0	1–2	Friendly
6	23 May 2008	Sydney Football Stadium, Sydney, Australia	Ghana	1–0	1–0	Friendly
7	19 August 2008	Loftus Road, London, England	South Africa	1–1	2–2	Friendly
8	10 June 2009	Stadium Australia, Sydney, Australia	Bahrain	1–0	2–0	2010 FIFA World Cup qualification (AFC)

== Managerial statistics ==
As of match played 19 February 2026

Managerial record by team and tenure
Team	Nat.	From	To	Record								Ref.
Team	Nat.	From	To	G	W	D	L	GF	GA	GD	Win %	Ref.
Macarthur	(Australia)	23 January 2023	18 August 2026	110	46	26	38	196	177	+19	41.82	
Career Total				110	46	26	38	196	177	+19	41.82	

== Honours ==
=== Player ===
Sydney United

- NSL Minor Premiership: 1999

FC Basel

- Swiss Super League: 2004–05; runner-up 2005–06, 2006–07
- Swiss Cup: 2007
- UEFA Cup quarter-finals: 2006

Derby County

- League Cup semi-finals: 2009

Perth Glory

- Club Golden Boot Award: 2010

Central Coast Mariners

- A-League Championship: 2013

Australia

- FIFA Confederations Cup: 3rd place, 2001
- OFC Nations Cup: 2004

Australia U-20

- OFC U-19 Men's Championship: 1998

=== Manager ===
Macarthur FC

- Australia Cup: 2024

== Sources ==
- Die ersten 125 Jahre. Publisher: Josef Zindel im Friedrich Reinhardt Verlag, Basel. ISBN 978-3-7245-2305-5
- Verein "Basler Fussballarchiv" Homepage
- FCB portrait Mile Sterjovski (German)
