= Skorich =

Skorich is a surname. Notable people with the surname include:

- Anthony Skorich (born 1990), Australian footballer
- Nick Skorich (1921–2004), American football player and coach
