= Fan Lingjiang =

Chinese football player

Fan Lingjiang 范凌江
Personal information
- Date of birth: October 8, 1989 (age 37)
- Place of birth: Shanghai, China
- Height: 1.78 m (5 ft 10 in)
- Position: Left back

Senior career*
Years	Team	Apps	(Gls)
2009–2015	Shanghai Shenhua	27	(0)
2013	→ Jiangxi Liansheng (loan)	11	(1)
2016–2017	Qingdao Huanghai	52	(0)
2018–2020	Beijing Enterprises Group	61	(0)
- * Club domestic league appearances and goals as of 31 December 2020

Fan Lingjiang (Chinese: 范凌江; born 8 October 1989) is a Chinese football player.

== Club career ==
In 2009, Fan Lingjiang started his professional footballer career with Shanghai Shenhua in the Chinese Super League. On 10 May 2011, Fan made his debut for Shanghai Shenhua in the last group match of 2011 AFC Champions League against Suwon Samsung Bluewings, which ended in a 3-0 defeat. In the 2013 season Fan moved to China League Two side Jiangxi Liansheng on a one-year loan deal.

On 23 February 2016, Fan transferred to China League One club Qingdao Huanghai. Starting at left back, Fan made his debut for the club in a league game on March 13, 2016 in a 3-0 defeat to Tianjin Quanjian.

On 28 February 2018, Fan transferred to China League One side Beijing Enterprises Group.

== Career statistics ==
Statistics accurate as of match played 31 December 2020.

Appearances and goals by club, season and competition
Club	Season	League			National Cup		Continental		Other		Total	
Club	Season	Division	Apps	Goals	Apps	Goals	Apps	Goals	Apps	Goals	Apps	Goals
Shanghai Shenhua	2009	Chinese Super League	0	0	-		0	0	-		0	0
Shanghai Shenhua	2011	Chinese Super League	0	0	0	0	1	0	-		1	0
Shanghai Shenhua	2012	Chinese Super League	5	0	0	0	-		-		5	0
Shanghai Shenhua	2014	Chinese Super League	16	0	3	0	-		-		19	0
Shanghai Shenhua	2015	Chinese Super League	6	0	3	1	-		-		9	1
Shanghai Shenhua	Total		27	0	6	1	1	0	0	0	34	1
Jiangxi Liansheng (loan)	2013	China League Two	11	1	0	0	-		-		11	1
Qingdao Huanghai	2016	China League One	27	0	0	0	-		-		27	0
Qingdao Huanghai	2017	China League One	25	0	0	0	-		-		25	0
Qingdao Huanghai	Total		52	0	0	0	0	0	0	0	52	0
Beijing Enterprises Group	2018	China League One	24	0	0	0	-		-		24	0
Beijing Enterprises Group	2019	China League One	26	0	1	0	-		-		27	0
Beijing Enterprises Group	2020	China League One	11	0	-		-		-		11	0
Beijing Enterprises Group	Total		61	0	1	0	0	0	0	0	62	0
Career total			151	1	7	1	1	0	0	0	159	2
