= Andrezinho (footballer, born 1985) =

Brazilian footballer

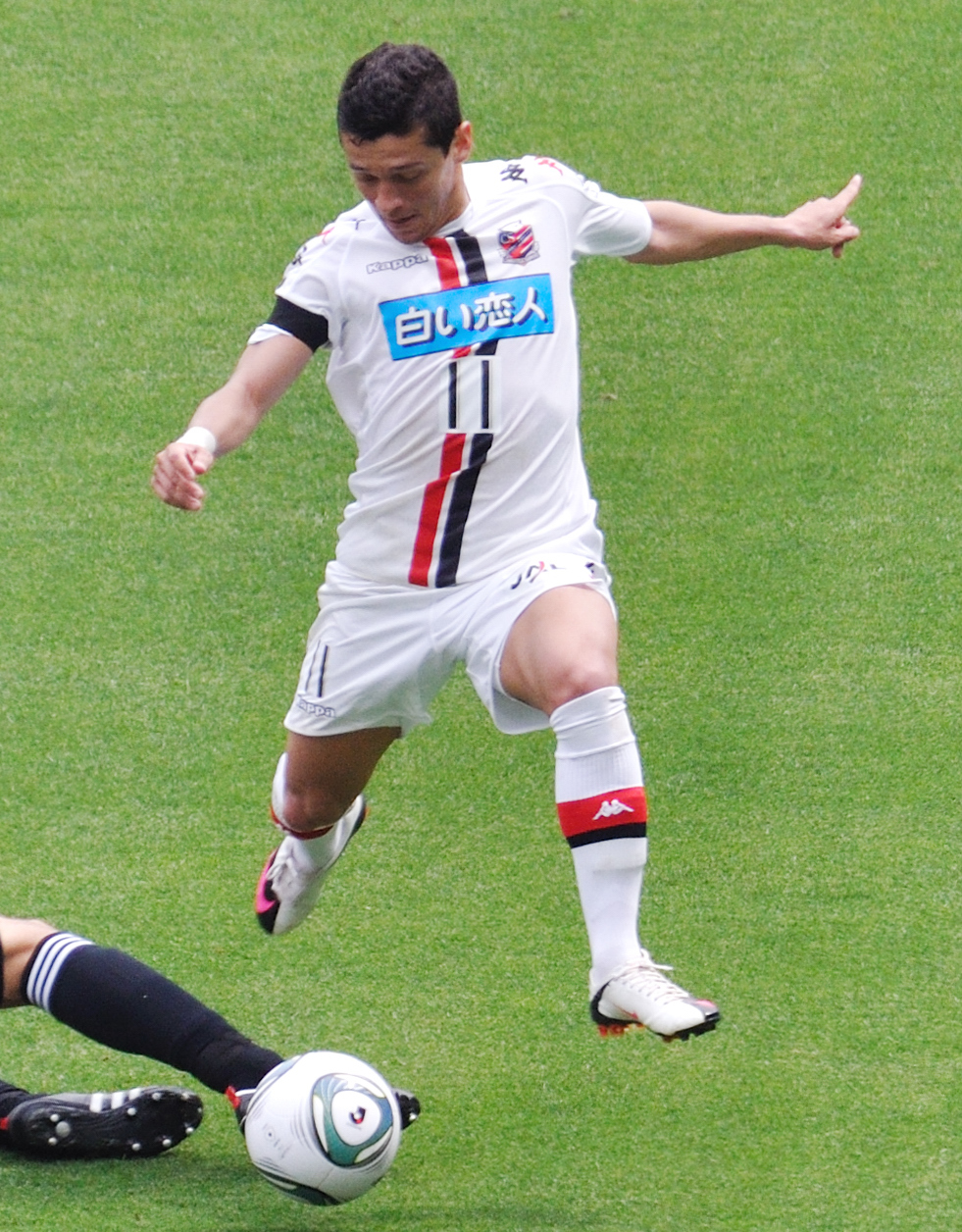

Personal information
- Full name: André Luiz Rodrigues Lopes
- Date of birth: 15 February 1985 (age 41)
- Place of birth: Campo Grande, Mato Grosso do Sul, Brazil
- Height: 1.71 m (5 ft 7 in)
- Position: Midfielder

Senior career*
Years	Team	Apps	(Gls)
2002–2003	Atlético Mineiro	1	(0)
2003–2007	CENE	52	(15)
2004–2005	→ Juventude (loan)	20	(5)
2008	CENE	25	(7)
2008	Roma	15	(4)
2008	→ Tokushima Vortis (loan)	12	(2)
2009–2010	River Plate Montevideo	12	(1)
2010	Liaoning Whowin	18	(3)
2011	Consadole Sapporo	7	(0)
2011–2012	Perth Glory	25	(2)
2012	AEP Paphos	9	(1)
2013	Campinense	9	(1)
2013	Ordabasy	6	(1)
2014	Guarani	7	(0)
2014	CENE	10	(1)
2014–2016	Phuket	48	(3)
2016	Confiança	2	(1)
2017	Toledo	3	(0)
2017–2018	Sohar SC	10	(0)
2018	Ozone	8	(4)
2018	Brasil Farroupilha	9	(0)
2019	Preston Lions	10	(1)
2019	George Cross	8	(1)
2020	Veranópolis		

International career
2004	Brazil under-20		
- * Club domestic league appearances and goals as of 17:47, 25 August 2021 (UTC)

André Luiz Rodrigues Lopes, or simply Andrezinho (born February 15, 1985), is a Brazilian footballer.

== Club career ==
=== Early career ===
Prior to playing in Australia, Andrezinho had spent time with Brazilian clubs Atlético Mineiro, CENE, Juventude and Roma. He's also played in Uruguay for River Plate Montevideo and in China for Liaoning Whowin. Andrezinho played in Japan for Tokushima Vortis and Consadole Sapporo.

=== Perth Glory ===
On 4 August 2011, he signed a contract with A-League club, Perth Glory after the club decided to find a replacement for injured Victor Sikora. He made his debut in the A-League in Round 1 against Adelaide United. Andrezinho suffered an injury that prevented him from playing in the 2012 A-League Grand Final.

In July 2012, he joined Cypriot side AEP Paphos.

In June 2013 Andrezinho joined Kazakhstan Premier League side FC Ordabasy.

In July 2013 Andrezinho joined Thai Division 1 League side Phuket F.C.

In 2019, Andrezinho returned to Australia to sign with Victorian State League Division 1 side Preston Lions FC. However, after 10 appearances and 1 goal, he left the club mid-season to join fellow Division 1 side Caroline Springs George Cross FC.

=== Return to Brazil ===
In December 2019 Veranópolis confirmed, that Andrezinho had joined the club.

== Club statistics ==
As of 22 October 2013

Club performance			League		League Cup		Cup		Continental		Total	
Season	Club	League	Apps	Goals	Apps	Goals	Apps	Goals	Apps	Goals	Apps	Goals
2008	Tokushima Vortis	J2 League	12	2	-				-		12	2
2010	Liaoning Whowin	Chinese Super League	18	3			-		-		18	3
2011	Consadole Sapporo	J2 League	7	0	-				-		7	0
2011-12	Perth Glory	A-League	25	2	3	0	-		-		25	2
2012–13	AEP Paphos	Cypriot First Division	9	1			-		-		9	1
2013	Ordabasy	Kazakhstan Premier League	6	1	0	0	-		-		6	1
Country	Japan		19	2	0	0	0	0	0	0	19	2
Country	China		18	3	0	0	-		-		18	3
Country	Australia		22	2	3	0	-		-		25	2
Country	Cyprus		9	1			-		-		9	1
Country	Kazakhstan		6	1	0	0	-		-		6	1
Total			74	9	3	0	-		-		77	9
