= Josh Mitchell =

Australian soccer player (born 1984)

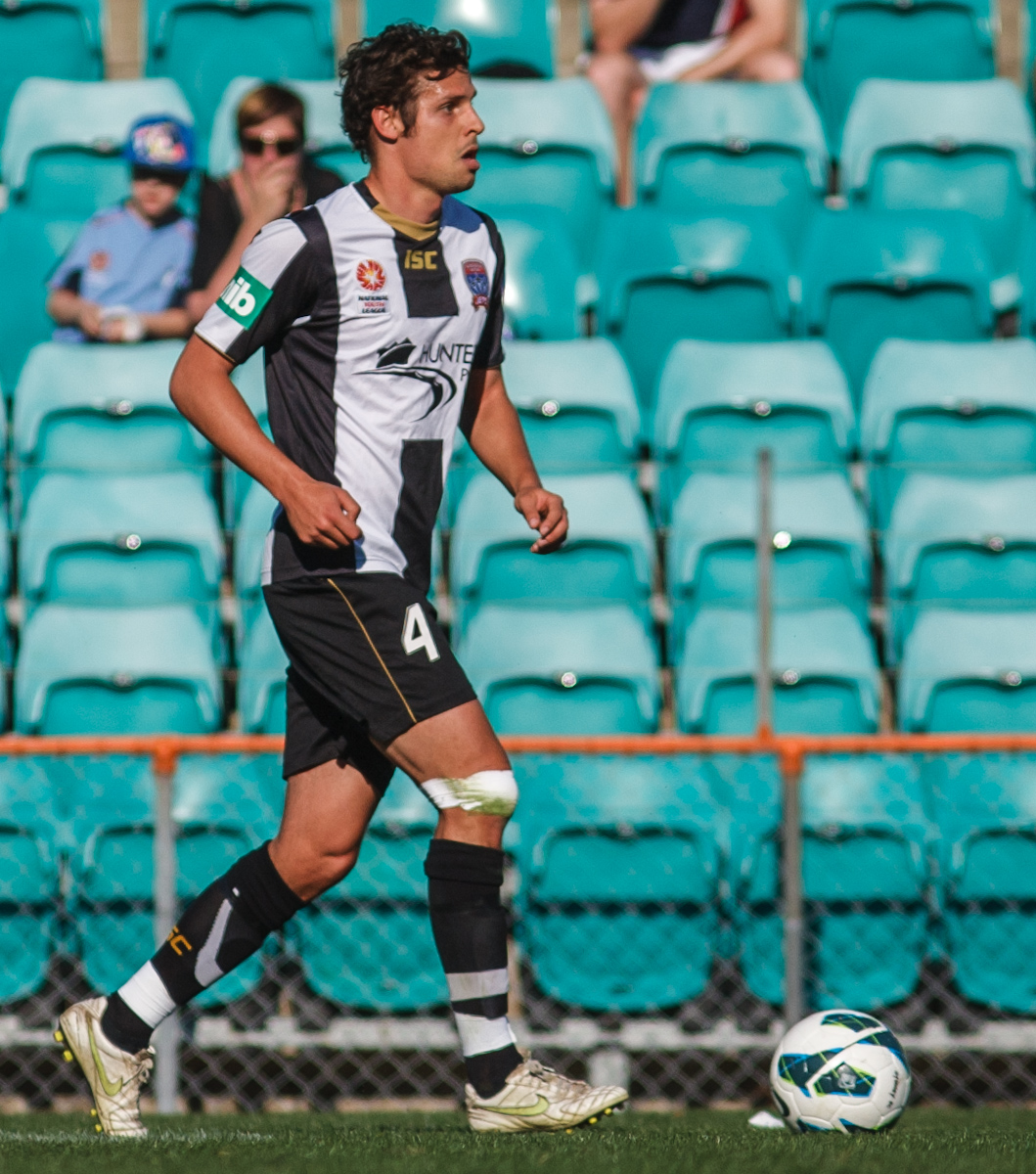
- Mitchell playing for Newcastle Jets in 2012

Personal information
- Date of birth: 8 June 1984 (age 42)
- Place of birth: Newcastle, New South Wales, Australia
- Height: 1.85 m (6 ft 1 in)
- Positions: Central defender; left-back

Senior career*
Years	Team	Apps	(Gls)
2001–2002	Central Coast Lightning	1	(0)
2002–2004	Newcastle Jets	21	(0)
2004–2005	Central Coast Lightning	25	(5)
2005–2009	Universitatea Craiova	107	(3)
2010–2012	Perth Glory	35	(2)
2012–2014	Newcastle Jets	27	(1)
2014–2015	Liaoning Whowin	23	(0)
2016–2017	Eastern	16	(4)
Total		255	(15)
- * Club domestic league appearances and goals

Josh Mitchell (born 8 June 1984) is an Australian former soccer player who played as a central defender.

== Career ==
Josh Mitchell was born in Belmont, Newcastle, and began playing football at the age of 4 at Swansea Swans Soccer Club and was selected for the Australian School Boys Football team in 2002. His professional career commenced in the 2002–03 season with Newcastle United Jets, where he made his debut against NSL champions Perth Glory. In the 2003–04 season Mitchell went on to become a regular starter in the Newcastle United side. After a brief stint with The Central Coast in the NSW Premier league, Mitchell signed in July 2005 with Romanian club Universitatea Craiova.

In his first season with Universitatea Craiova, Mitchell started in 26 games helping the club in promotion back to the Liga I in Romania. On 15 April 2010, it was confirmed that Mitchell along with his Universitatea Craiova teammate Michael Baird had returned home to sign for A league side Perth Glory. Then Mitchell played for his home club Newcastle Jets after signing a two-year deal on 28 June 2012.

On 25 June 2014, Mitchell transferred to Chinese Super League side Liaoning Whowin.

On 7 July 2016, Mitchell signed with Hong Kong Premier League club Eastern.

== Career statistics ==
As of 6 May 2017

Appearances and goals by club, season and competition
Club	Season	League			Cup		Continental		Other		Total	
Club	Season	Division	Apps	Goals	Apps	Goals	Apps	Goals	Apps	Goals	Apps	Goals
Perth Glory	2010–11	A-League	18	1	—		—		—		18	1
Perth Glory	2011–12	A-League	17	1	—		—		—		17	1
Perth Glory	Total		35	2	—		—		—		35	2
Newcastle Jets	2012–13	A-League	15	1	—		—		—		15	1
Newcastle Jets	2013–14	A-League	12	0	—		—		—		12	0
Newcastle Jets	Total		27	1	—		—		—		27	1
Liaoning Whowin	2014	Chinese Super League	15	0	—		—		—		15	0
Liaoning Whowin	2015	Chinese Super League	8	0	0	0	—		—		8	0
Liaoning Whowin	Total		23	0	0	0	—		—		23	0
Eastern	2016–17	Hong Kong Premier League	16	4	2	0	6	0	4	1	28	5
Career total			102	7	2	0	6	0	4	1	114	8

== Honours ==
Universitatea Craiova

- Divizia B: 2005–06
