= Richard Manu =

Ghanaian footballer

Personal information
- Full name: Richard Manu
- Date of birth: 20 January 1974 (age 52)
- Place of birth: Ghana
- Position: Left-back

Senior career*
Years	Team	Apps	(Gls)
–1996	Eimsbütteler TV		
1996–2003	Borussia Neunkirchen		
2003–2004	Eintracht Bad Kreuznach		
2004–2005	TuRU Düsseldorf		
2005–2007	SC Halberg Brebach		
2007–2009	Asante Kotoko		
- * Club domestic league appearances and goals

Richard Manu (born 20 January 1974) is a Ghanaian former professional footballer who played as a left-back.

== Club career ==
Born in Ghana, Manu moved from Hamburg-based club Eimsbütteler TV to Borussia Neunkirchen in the 1996–97 season. In 2003, he left the club to join Eintracht Bad Kreuznach. A year later, he signed with TuRU Düsseldorf. In 2006, he moved to SC Halberg Brebach. He joined Asante Kotoko in October 2007 after training with the club during its training tour in Germany.

== International career ==
Manu was a member of the Ghana national team. He was called up for the Black Stars for the game versus Mexico on 26 March 2008.
