= Tommy Amphlett =

English footballer

Personal information
- Date of birth: 14 September 1988 (age 38)
- Place of birth: Stoke-on-Trent, England
- Position: Striker

Team information
- Current team: Olympic Kingsway

Youth career
- –2006: ECU Joondalup

Senior career*
| Years | Team | Apps | (Gls) |
| 2006–2009 | ECU Joondalup | 29 | (16) |
| 2009–2012 | Perth Glory | 27 | (0) |
| 2012–2021 | ECU Joondalup | | |
| 2022– | Olympic Kingsway | 14 | (4) |
- * Club domestic league appearances and goals as of 19 September 2022

Tommy Amphlett (born 14 September 1988) is an English footballer who plays for ECU Joondalup.

== Club career ==
=== Early career ===
Amphlett started his career in Perth with the club ECU Joondalup in the Football West Premier League.

=== Perth Glory ===
On 21 November 2009 he was signed by Perth Glory on a permanent contract after Anthony Skorich was placed on the club's long-term injury list. At the end of the 2011–12 A-League season, Amphlett was released by the club.
