= Li Wenbo =

Chinese footballer (born 1983)

Li Wenbo 李文博
Personal information
- Full name: Li Wenbo
- Date of birth: 9 December 1983 (age 42)
- Place of birth: Shenyang, Liaoning, China
- Height: 1.78 m (5 ft 10 in)
- Position: Fullback

Senior career*
Years	Team	Apps	(Gls)
2003–2013	Guangzhou R&F	186	(3)
2014–2016	Shanghai Shenhua	18	(0)
2017	Hebei Elite	8	(0)
2018	Shenyang Dongjin	2	(0)
- * Club domestic league appearances and goals as of 12 July 2018

Li Wenbo (Chinese: 李文博; born 9 December 1983 in Shenyang) is a former Chinese footballer who played as a defender.

== Club career ==
Li Wenbo began his professional football career with Shenyang Ginde and made his league debut on 13 July 2003, in a 1–0 home defeat against Qingdao Beilaite. His second league appearance came at the beginning of the 2005 league season in the first game of the league campaign against Beijing Guoan on April 3, 2005, in a 1–1 draw. He established himself as regular within the team's defence and scored his first league goal against Shanghai Shenhua on October 23, 2005, in a 2–1 defeat. For the next several seasons was an important member of the team and was part of the squad that moved to Changsha when the club renamed themselves Changsha Ginde.

By the 2010 Chinese Super League, Li was part of the team that were relegated at the end of the season. Throughout the league break there was much speculation about his future and it was expected that he would transfer to second-tier club Shenyang Dongjin in February 2011. Li decided to stay with his club and was with them when the club moved to Guangzhou and renamed themselves Guangzhou R&F, which revived the club and they were promoted at the end of the 2011 China League One season.

In February 2014, Li transferred to fellow Super League club Shanghai Greenland Shenhua.

Li joined China League Two side Shenyang Dongjin in June 2018. On 23 June 2018, he made his debut in a 2–0 away defeat against Baotou Nanjiao. Li became a free player in July 2018 when Shenyang Dongjin failed to register for the rest of the season due to wage arrears.

== Career statistics ==
Statistics accurate as of match played 12 July 2018.

Club performance			League		Cup		League Cup		Continental		Total	
Season	Club	League	Apps	Goals	Apps	Goals	Apps	Goals	Apps	Goals	Apps	Goals
China PR			League		FA Cup		CSL Cup		Asia		Total	
2003	Guangzhou R&F	Chinese Jia-A League	1	0			-		-		1	0
2004	Guangzhou R&F	Chinese Super League	0	0					-		0	0
2005	Guangzhou R&F	Chinese Super League	17	1					-		17	1
2006	Guangzhou R&F	Chinese Super League	18	0			-		-		18	0
2007	Guangzhou R&F	Chinese Super League	25	0	-		-		-		25	0
2008	Guangzhou R&F	Chinese Super League	26	0	-		-		-		26	0
2009	Guangzhou R&F	Chinese Super League	25	1	-		-		-		25	1
2010	Guangzhou R&F	Chinese Super League	13	0	-		-		-		13	0
2011	Guangzhou R&F	China League One	23	1			-		-		23	1
2012	Guangzhou R&F	Chinese Super League	15	0	1	0	-		-		16	0
2013	Guangzhou R&F	Chinese Super League	23	0	2	0	-		-		25	0
2014	Shanghai Shenhua	Chinese Super League	14	0	1	0	-		-		15	0
2015	Shanghai Shenhua	Chinese Super League	2	0	0	0	-		-		2	0
2016	Shanghai Shenhua	Chinese Super League	2	0	2	0	-		-		4	0
2017	Hebei Elite	China League Two	8	0	1	0	-		-		9	0
2018	Shenyang Dongjin	China League Two	2	0	0	0	-		-		2	0
Total	China PR		214	3	7	0	0	0	0	0	221	3
