= Howard Fondyke =

Australian footballer

Personal information
- Full name: Howard Fondyke
- Date of birth: 5 January 1990 (age 36)
- Place of birth: Perth, Western Australia
- Height: 1.80 m (5 ft 11 in)
- Position: Midfielder

Youth career
- 2008: AIS
- 2008–2009: Perth Glory

Senior career*
Years	Team	Apps	(Gls)
2008	AIS	18	(0)
2009–2011	Perth Glory	14	(0)
2012	Hume City	14	(0)
2013–2014	Bonnyrigg White Eagles	46	(3)
2015–2016	Sydney Olympic	25	(0)
2017	Parramatta FC	12	(3)
2017	Bonnyrigg White Eagles	8	(0)
2018	APIA Leichhardt	24	(3)
2019	Rockdale City	12	(0)

Managerial career
- 2020–: Sydney FC U20
- * Club domestic league appearances and goals as of 23 September 2019

Howard Fondyke (born 5 January 1990) is an Australian footballer who played for Perth Glory and APIA Leichhardt.

== Career ==
After playing in Perth's inaugural National Youth League team, Howard signed a 2-year contract prior to the 2009/10 season. He failed to play a single game in that campaign. However, he did feature heavily in the club's youth team for that season, even coming on in the 58' against Gold Coast United during the A-League National Youth League Grand Final on 20 March 2010.

Since leaving Perth, Fondyke has been trialling in Scotland with Scottish Premier League club St.Mirren, as well as newly promoted First Division side Ayr United, in the hope he will be signed for the upcoming 2010–11 Season.

== A-League career statistics ==
(Correct as of 21 March 2011)

Club	Season	League		Finals		Asia		Total	
Club	Season	Apps	Goals	Apps	Goals	Apps	Goals	Apps	Goals
Perth Glory	2009–10	0	0	0	0	–	–	0	0
Perth Glory	2010–11	14	0	–	–	–	–	14	0
Total		14	0	0	0	0	0	14	0
