= Qiu Shengjiong =

Chinese footballer

Qiu Shengjiong 邱盛炯
Personal information
- Full name: Qiu Shengjiong
- Date of birth: 1 September 1985 (age 41)
- Place of birth: Shanghai, China
- Height: 1.85 m (6 ft 1 in)
- Position: Goalkeeper

Youth career
- 2003–2005: Shanghai Shenhua

Senior career*
Years	Team	Apps	(Gls)
2006–2018	Shanghai Shenhua	102	(0)
2019	Guangdong South China Tiger	1	(0)
2020	Shanghai Jiading Huilong	9	(0)

International career
2008	China U23		
- * Club domestic league appearances and goals as of 31 December 2020

Qiu Shengjiong (Chinese: 邱盛炯; pinyin: Qiū Shèngjiǒng; born 1 September 1985, in Shanghai) is a Chinese former football goalkeeper.

== Club career ==
Qiu Shengjiong, nicknamed "Big Ox" due to his massive size, would start his career playing for the Shanghai Shenhua youth team where due to his frame and size he was often criticized for being too fat to play football, he would nevertheless play within the 2005 National Games of China for Shanghai where he impressed many by starring within a semi-final penalty shoot out against Hubei and helped guide Shanghai to a runners-up position within the tournament. This would then see Shenhua offer him promotion into the senior team in 2006, however it wasn't until the 2007 Chinese Super League season when Qiu made his league debut on August 12, 2007 against Beijing Guoan F.C. in a 3-2 victory. That performance would then see Qiu rise to prominence within the team and he would replace Wang Dalei as the club's first choice goalkeeper throughout the rest of the season. During the start of the 2008 league season he started several league games before Wang Dalei regained his position as the club's first choice goalkeeper. When Jia Xiuquan became the team's Head coach the goalkeeping position was up for grabs once again and they equally shared the goalkeeping position throughout the 2009 league campaign until the 2010 league campaign saw Miroslav Blažević as the team's Head coach and he placed Qiu Shengjiong as the second choice goalkeeper. In recent seasons, due to Wang Dalei's stable performance and Shanghai Shenhua's usual early elimination from China FA Cup, Qiu's playing time was severely limited. On 20 December 2018, Qiu announced his departure from Shenhua after 15 years with the club.

On 26 February 2019, Qiu joined China League One club Guangdong South China Tiger.

== International career ==
Due to his impressive performances at the end of the 2007 season he was called into the Football at the 2008 Summer Olympics – Men's tournament squad where he was first choice goalkeeper. However, due to disappointing results he was replaced by Liu Zhenli in the final group game.

== Career statistics ==
Statistics accurate as of match played 31 December 2020.

Appearances and goals by club, season and competition
Club	Season	League			National Cup		Continental		Other		Total	
Club	Season	Division	Apps	Goals	Apps	Goals	Apps	Goals	Apps	Goals	Apps	Goals
Shanghai Shenhua	2006	Chinese Super League	0	0	0	0	0	0	-		0	0
Shanghai Shenhua	2007	Chinese Super League	13	0	-		0	0	-		13	0
Shanghai Shenhua	2008	Chinese Super League	7	0	-		-		-		7	0
Shanghai Shenhua	2009	Chinese Super League	17	0	-		3	0	-		20	0
Shanghai Shenhua	2010	Chinese Super League	16	0	-		-		-		16	0
Shanghai Shenhua	2011	Chinese Super League	10	0	0	0	2	0	-		12	0
Shanghai Shenhua	2012	Chinese Super League	1	0	0	0	-		-		1	0
Shanghai Shenhua	2013	Chinese Super League	2	0	1	0	-		-		3	0
Shanghai Shenhua	2014	Chinese Super League	18	0	4	0	-		-		22	0
Shanghai Shenhua	2015	Chinese Super League	11	0	1	0	-		-		12	0
Shanghai Shenhua	2016	Chinese Super League	0	0	2	0	-		-		2	0
Shanghai Shenhua	2017	Chinese Super League	3	0	1	0	0	0	-		4	0
Shanghai Shenhua	2018	Chinese Super League	4	0	0	0	1	0	0 (Note: Appearances in Chinese FA Super Cup)	0	5	0
Shanghai Shenhua	Total		102	0	9	0	6	0	0	0	117	0
Guangdong South China Tiger	2019	China League One	1	0	1	0	-		-		2	0
Shanghai Jiading Huilong	2020	China League Two	9	0	-		-		-		9	0
Career total			112	0	10	0	6	0	0	0	128	0

== Honours ==
=== Club ===
Shanghai Shenhua

- Chinese FA Cup: 2017
