= Wang Sihan =

Chinese footballer

Wang Sihan 王思寒
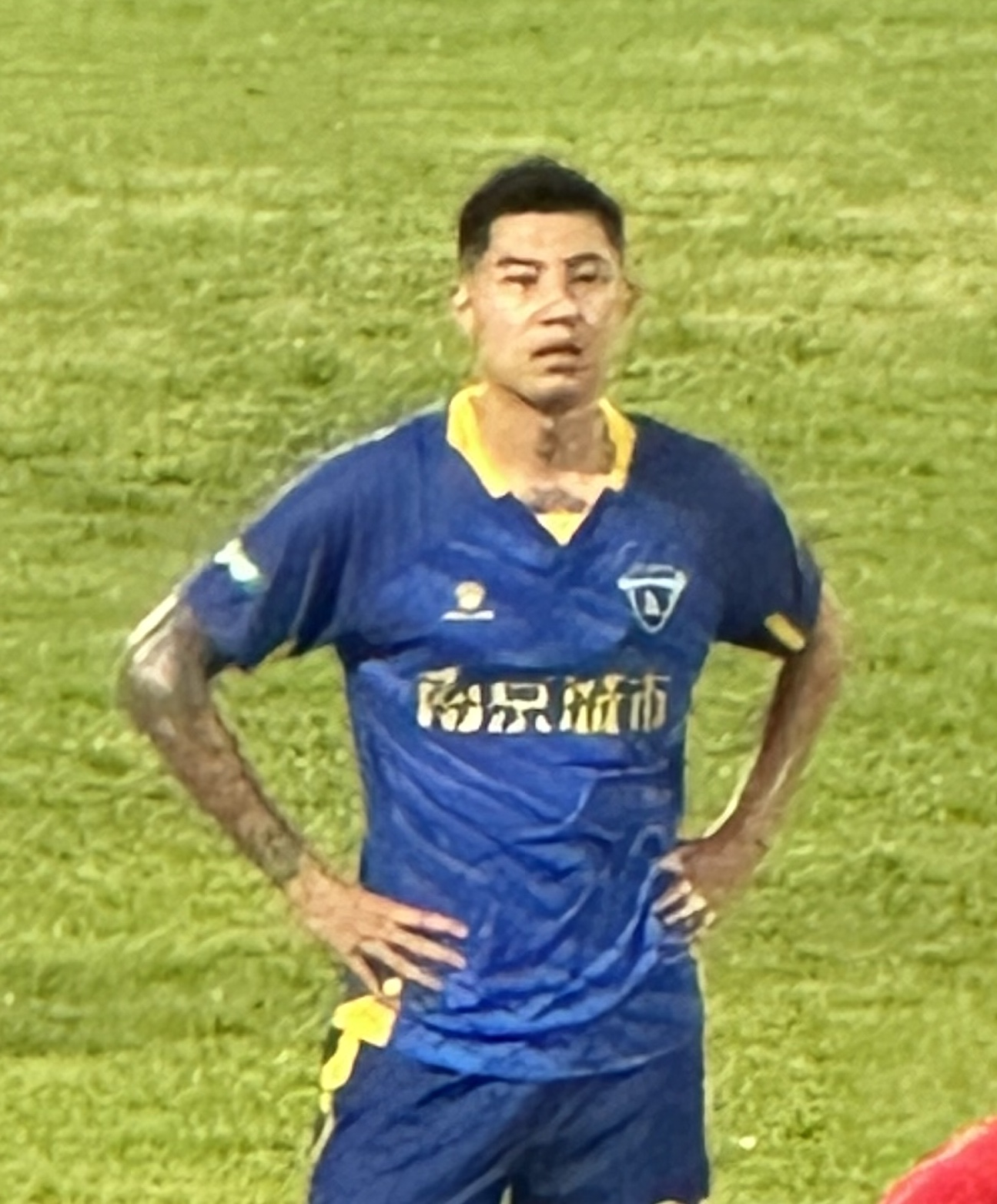
- Wang Sihan in August 2024

Personal information
- Date of birth: 3 April 1992 (age 34)
- Place of birth: Fushun, Liaoning, China
- Height: 1.85 m (6 ft 1 in)
- Positions: Defender; midfielder; forward

Team information
- Current team: Dingnan United
- Number: 27

Youth career
- 2009–2011: Liaoning Whowin

Senior career*
Years	Team	Apps	(Gls)
2012–2019	Liaoning Whowin	93	(7)
2020–2021	Qingdao FC	25	(1)
2022	Kunshan FC	4	(0)
2023	Changchun Shenhuá	6	(1)
2024	Nanjing City	21	(2)
2025–	Dingnan United	14	(0)
- * Club domestic league appearances and goals as of 9 March 2026

Wang Sihan (Chinese: 王思寒; born 3 April 1992), formerly known as Wang Hao (Chinese: 王皓), is a Chinese football player who plays as a defender, midfielder or striker for Dingnan United. In March 2025, he was banned from playing professional football by the Chinese Football Association for three months for age falsification and identity fraud.

== Club career ==
Wang Sihan would play for the Liaoning Whowin youth team and was promoted to train with the senior team during the 2011 league season. In the training sessions he would impress the Head coach Ma Lin who decided to promote him to the senior team. Wang Sihan would officially start his professional football career when Liaoning Whowin included him in their 2012 Chinese Super League squad. He would eventually make his league debut for Liaoning on 17 March 2012 in a game against Guizhou Renhe, coming on as a substitute for Yang Xu in the 84th minute. Initially Wang started as forward within the team, however by the time he scored his first goal for the club on 11 May 2016 in a Chinese FA Cup game against Chengdu Qbao he had often been used as a utility player. His versatility would be highlighted on 3 March 2017 in a league game against Guizhou Hengfeng when the team's goalkeeper Shi Xiaotian was sent off in the 65th minute and Wang had to replace him for the remainder of the game that ended in a 1-1 draw. While Wang may have established himself as a regular within the team due to his versatility, the team was relegated at the end of the 2017 Chinese Super League. On 28 February 2020, Wang joined newly promoted Qingdao Huanghai for the start of the 2020 Chinese Super League.

== Career statistics ==
Statistics accurate as of match played 31 December 2025.

Appearances and goals by club, season and competition
Club	Season	League			National Cup		Continental		Other		Total	
Club	Season	Division	Apps	Goals	Apps	Goals	Apps	Goals	Apps	Goals	Apps	Goals
Liaoning Whowin	2012	Chinese Super League	2	0	0	0	-		-		2	0
Liaoning Whowin	2013	Chinese Super League	3	0	1	0	-		-		4	0
Liaoning Whowin	2014	Chinese Super League	11	0	1	0	-		-		12	0
Liaoning Whowin	2015	Chinese Super League	8	0	1	0	-		-		9	0
Liaoning Whowin	2016	Chinese Super League	5	0	2	1	-		-		7	1
Liaoning Whowin	2017	Chinese Super League	17	2	0	0	-		-		17	2
Liaoning Whowin	2018	China League One	19	2	2	1	-		-		21	3
Liaoning Whowin	2019	China League One	26	3	1	0	-		2 (Note: Appearances in 2019 China League One relegation play-offs)	0	29	3
Liaoning Whowin	Total		91	7	8	2	0	0	2	0	101	9
Qingdao Huanghai	2020	Chinese Super League	5	0	0	0	-		-		5	0
Qingdao Huanghai	2021	Chinese Super League	18	1	1	0	-		2 (Note: Appearances in 2021 Chinese Super League relegation play-offs)	0	21	1
Qingdao Huanghai	Total		23	1	1	0	0	0	2	0	26	1
Kunshan FC	2022	China League One	4	0	0	0	-		-		4	0
Changchun Shenhuá	2023	Chinese Champions League	6	1	-		-		-		6	1
Nanjing City	2024	China League One	21	2	4	0	-		-		25	2
Dingnan United	2025	China League One	14	0	0	0	-		-		14	0
Career total			159	11	13	2	0	0	4	0	176	13

== Honours ==
Kunshan FC

- China League One: 2022
