= Liu Jiawei =

Chinese footballer

Liu Jiawei 刘嘉伟
Personal information
- Full name: Liu Jiawei
- Date of birth: 28 April 1993 (age 33)
- Place of birth: Hong'an, Hubei, China
- Height: 1.80 m (5 ft 11 in)
- Position: Midfielder

Youth career
- Hubei Youth
- 2013: Guangzhou R&F
- 2013–2014: Shanghai Shenhua

Senior career*
Years	Team	Apps	(Gls)
2011–2012	Hubei Youth	11	(0)
2014–2019	Shanghai Shenhua	4	(0)
2015–2016	→ Atlético Museros (loan)	26	(0)
2016–2017	→ La Roda (loan)	9	(0)
2018	→ Xinjiang Tianshan Leopard (loan)	14	(0)
2020	Shaanxi Warriors Beyond	7	(0)
2021	Liaoning Shenyang Urban	9	(0)
- * Club domestic league appearances and goals as of 29 April 2022

Liu Jiawei (Chinese: 刘嘉伟; born 28 April 1993) is a Chinese footballer who plays as midfielder.

== Club career ==
In 2011, Liu Jiawei started his professional footballer career with Hubei Youth in the China League Two. He transferred to Chinese Super League club Shanghai Greenland in 2014 after a short spell with Guangzhou R&F. On 27 September 2014, Li made his debut for Shanghai Shenhua in the 2014 Chinese Super League against Shandong Luneng Taishan. He was loaned to Shanghai Shenhua's satellite team Atlético Museros in the Regional Preferente de la Comunidad Valenciana for the 2015–16 season. In July 2016, Liu was loaned to Segunda División B side La Roda for one season.

== Career statistics ==
As of 31 December 2019.

Appearances and goals by club, season and competition
Club	Season	League			National Cup		Continental		Other		Total	
Club	Season	Division	Apps	Goals	Apps	Goals	Apps	Goals	Apps	Goals	Apps	Goals
Hubei Youth	2011	China League Two			-		-		-			
Hubei Youth	2012	China League Two	11	0	0	0	-		-		11	0
Hubei Youth	Total		11	0	0	0	0	0	0	0	11	0
Shanghai Shenhua	2014	Chinese Super League	3	0	1	0	-		-		4	0
Shanghai Shenhua	2017	Chinese Super League	1	0	0	0	0	0	-		1	0
Shanghai Shenhua	Total		4	0	1	0	0	0	0	0	5	0
Atlético Museros (loan)	2015–16	Regional Preferente (Valencia)	26	0	0	0	-		-		26	0
La Roda (loan)	2016–17	Segunda División B	9	0	0	0	-		-		9	0
Xinjiang Tianshan Leopard (loan)	2018	China League One	14	0	1	0	-		-		15	0
Career total			64	0	2	0	0	0	0	0	66	0
