= Han Yi (footballer) =

Chinese association football player

Personal information
- Date of birth: 31 January 1993 (age 33)
- Height: 1.85 m (6 ft 1 in)
- Position: Forward

Team information
- Current team: Xinjiang Tianshan Leopard

Youth career
- –2012: Dalian Shide

Senior career*
Years	Team	Apps	(Gls)
2012	Dalian Shide	0	(0)
2014–2015	Shanghai Shenhua	0	(0)
2016–2020	Beijing BSU	6	(1)
2017	→ Hunan Billows (loan)	22	(5)
2020	→ Hebei Zhuoao (loan)	4	(0)
2021	Zibo Cuju	14	(0)
2022-	Xinjiang Tianshan Leopard	3	(0)
- * Club domestic league appearances and goals as of 14:01, 5 May 2022 (UTC)

Han Yi (Chinese: 韩毅; born 31 January 1993) is a Chinese footballer currently playing as a forward for Xinjiang Tianshan Leopard F.C.

== Career statistics ==
=== Club ===
As of 28 July 2021.

Club	Season	League			Cup		Continental		Other		Total	
Club	Season	Division	Apps	Goals	Apps	Goals	Apps	Goals	Apps	Goals	Apps	Goals
Dalian Shide	2012	Chinese Super League	0	0	1 (Note: Appearances in the Chinese FA Cup)	0	–		0	0	1	0
Shanghai Shenhua	2014	Chinese Super League	0	0	0	0	–		0	0	0	0
Shanghai Shenhua	2015	Chinese Super League	0	0	0	0	–		0	0	0	0
Shanghai Shenhua	Total		0	0	0	0	0	0	0	0	0	0
Beijing BSU	2016	China League One	2	0	0	0	–		0	0	3	0
Beijing BSU	2017	China League One	0	0	0	0	–		0	0	0	0
Beijing BSU	2018	China League One	1	0	1	0	–		0	0	2	0
Beijing BSU	2019	China League One	3	1	2	0	–		0	0	5	1
Beijing BSU	2020	China League One	0	0	0	0	–		0	0	0	0
Beijing BSU	Total		6	1	3	0	0	0	0	0	9	1
Hunan Billows (loan)	2017	China League Two	20	5	0	0	–		2 (Note: Appearances in the China League Two playoffs)	0	22	5
Hebei Zhuoao (loan)	2020	China League Two	4	0	0	0	–		0	0	4	0
Zibo Cuju	2020	China League One	1	0	0	0	–		0	0	1	0
Career total			31	6	4	0	0	0	2	0	37	6
