= Gao Di (footballer) =

Chinese footballer

Gao Di 高迪
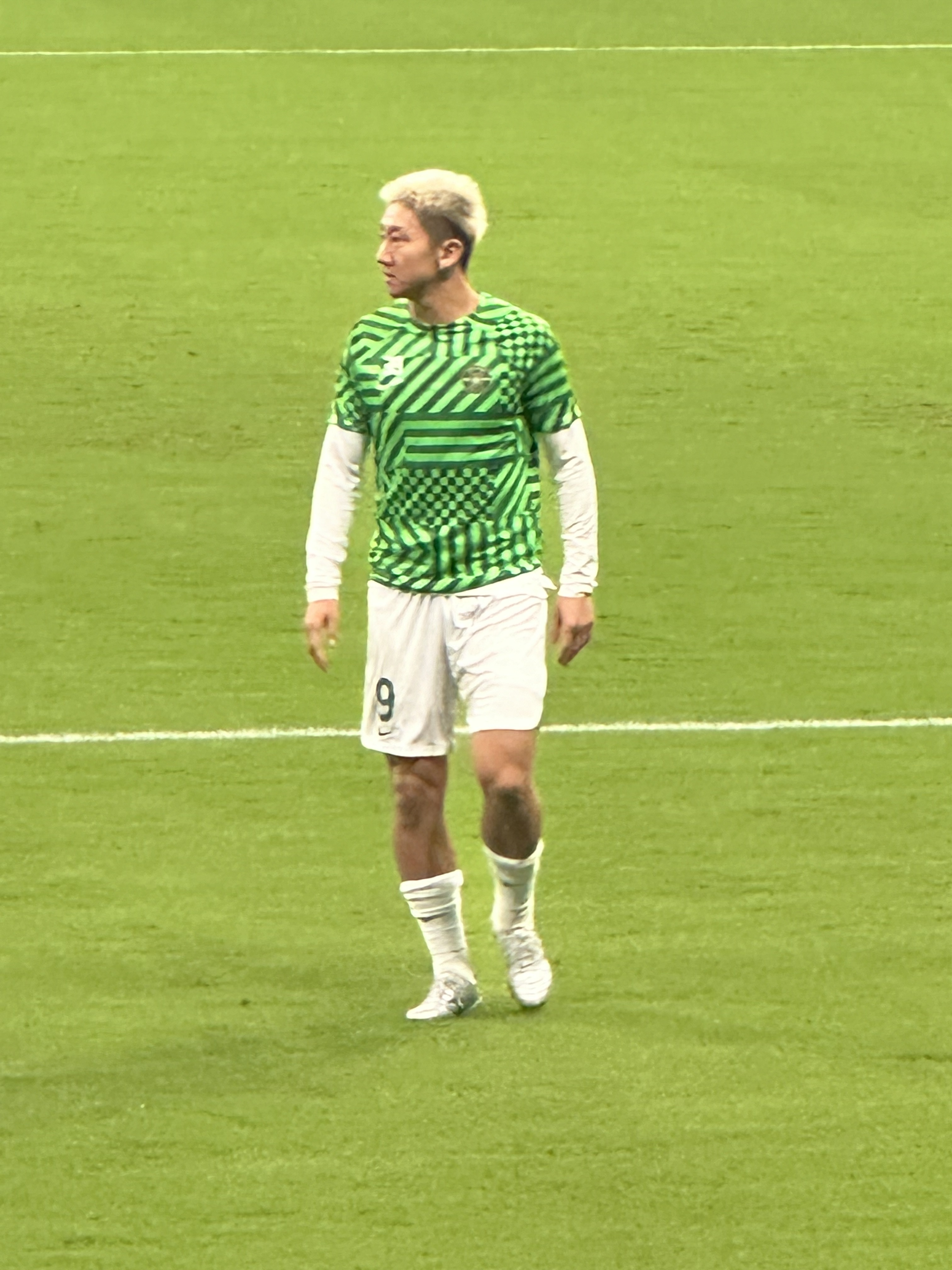
- Gao Di in August 2024

Personal information
- Full name: Gao Di
- Date of birth: 6 January 1990 (age 36)
- Place of birth: Qufu, Shandong, China
- Height: 1.81 m (5 ft 11 in)
- Position: Forward

Team information
- Current team: Zhejiang FC
- Number: 9

Youth career
- 1999–2007: Shandong Luneng

Senior career*
| Years | Team | Apps | (Gls) |
| 2008–2013 | Shandong Luneng | 10 | (1) |
| 2013 | → Hangzhou Greentown (loan) | 21 | (5) |
| 2014–2021 | Shanghai Shenhua | 78 | (9) |
| 2017 | → Jiangsu Suning (loan) | 13 | (0) |
| 2020 | → Changchun Yatai (loan) | 13 | (4) |
| 2021 | → Zhejiang Energy Greentown (loan) | 23 | (4) |
| 2022–2024 | Zhejiang FC | 72 | (13) |
| 2025 | Qingdao West Coast | 23 | (2) |
| 2026– | Zhejiang FC | 15 | (3) |

International career^{‡}
| 2007–2008 | China U-20 | | |
| 2009–2012 | China U-23 | | |
| 2014 | China | 2 | (1) |
- * Club domestic league appearances and goals as of 19 November 2026 ‡ National team caps and goals as of 22 June 2014

Gao Di (Chinese: 高迪; pinyin: Gāo Dí; born 6 January 1990) is a Chinese professional footballer who currently plays as a forward for Chinese Super League side Zhejiang FC.

== Club career ==
Gao Di started his football career with Shandong Luneng's youth academy in 1999 and was promoted to the first team during the 2008 league season. Despite not making a league appearance for Shandong, he was still given a league title medal because he was included in the team's eighteen-man squad. He would go on to make his debut on 20 May 2009 starting against Sriwijaya FC in an AFC Champions League game that saw Shandong lose 4-2 despite Gao scoring his debut goal. Gao would go on to make his league debut on 9 April 2010 against Chongqing Lifan in a 3-0 win, coming on as a late substitute.

In February 2013, Gao was loaned out to Hangzhou Greentown for the entire 2013 league season to gain more playing time. He scored his first goal for the club on his debut on 10 March 2013 against Changchun Yatai in a 1-1 draw.

On 24 February 2014, Gao transferred to fellow Chinese Super League side Shanghai Shenhua. He made his debut for the club in a 2-0 win against Shanghai Shenxin on 9 March 2014, scoring his first two goals for the club. On 28 February 2017, Gao was loaned to fellow Super League side Jiangsu Suning until 31 December 2017.

After many years in the top tier of Chinese football, Gao Di joined China League One club Changchun Yatai on loan ahead of the 2020 season. He scored his first goal for the club in his debut against Heilongjiang Lava Spring on 12 September 2020. Throughout the campaign he assisted the club in winning the division title and promotion to the top tier. Gao would remain within the division with another season long loan with Zhejiang Greentown whom he joined on 3 March 2021. Making his debut in a league game on 24 April 2021 against Zibo Cuju in a 4-0 victory. He would then play a vital part as the club gained promotion to the top tier at the end of the 2021 campaign.

On 26 January 2025, Gao joined Chinese Super League club Qingdao West Coast.

On 28 February 2026, Gao returned to Zhejiang FC.

== International career ==
Gao made his debut for the Chinese national team on 18 June 2014 in a 2-0 win against Macedonia, coming on as a substitute to score his first international goal.

== Career statistics ==
=== Club ===
Statistics accurate as of match played 31 January 2023.

Appearances and goals by club, season and competition
| Club | Season | League | | | National Cup | | Continental | | Other | | Total | |
| Club | Season | Division | Apps | Goals | Apps | Goals | Apps | Goals | Apps | Goals | Apps | Goals |
|---|---|---|---|---|---|---|---|---|---|---|---|---|
| Shandong Luneng | 2008 | Chinese Super League | 0 | 0 | - | | - | | - | | 0 | 0 |
| Shandong Luneng | 2009 | Chinese Super League | 0 | 0 | - | | 1 | 1 | - | | 1 | 1 |
| Shandong Luneng | 2010 | Chinese Super League | 7 | 0 | - | | 2 | 0 | - | | 9 | 0 |
| Shandong Luneng | 2011 | Chinese Super League | 1 | 0 | 0 | 0 | 0 | 0 | - | | 1 | 0 |
| Shandong Luneng | 2012 | Chinese Super League | 2 | 2 | 0 | 0 | - | | - | | 2 | 2 |
| Shandong Luneng | Total | | 10 | 2 | 0 | 0 | 3 | 1 | 0 | 0 | 13 | 3 |
| Hangzhou Greentown (Loan) | 2013 | Chinese Super League | 21 | 5 | 0 | 0 | - | | - | | 21 | 5 |
| Shanghai Shenhua | 2014 | Chinese Super League | 22 | 5 | 3 | 1 | - | | - | | 25 | 6 |
| Shanghai Shenhua | 2015 | Chinese Super League | 24 | 2 | 1 | 0 | - | | - | | 25 | 2 |
| Shanghai Shenhua | 2016 | Chinese Super League | 12 | 0 | 5 | 1 | - | | - | | 17 | 1 |
| Shanghai Shenhua | 2018 | Chinese Super League | 11 | 2 | 1 | 1 | 3 | 0 | 0 (Note: Appearances in Chinese FA Super Cup) | 0 | 15 | 3 |
| Shanghai Shenhua | 2019 | Chinese Super League | 8 | 0 | 1 | 1 | - | | - | | 9 | 1 |
| Shanghai Shenhua | 2020 | Chinese Super League | 0 | 0 | 0 | 0 | 2 | 0 | - | | 2 | 0 |
| Shanghai Shenhua | Total | | 77 | 9 | 11 | 4 | 5 | 0 | 0 | 0 | 93 | 13 |
| Jiangsu Suning (Loan) | 2017 | Chinese Super League | 13 | 0 | 4 | 0 | 0 | 0 | - | | 17 | 0 |
| Changchun Yatai (Loan) | 2020 | China League One | 13 | 4 | 0 | 0 | - | | - | | 13 | 4 |
| Zhejiang Energy Greentown (Loan) | 2021 | China League One | 23 | 4 | 2 | 0 | - | | 2 (Note: Appearances in Promotion/Relegation Play-offs) | 0 | 27 | 4 |
| Zhejiang FC | 2022 | Chinese Super League | 16 | 3 | 4 | 3 | - | | - | | 20 | 6 |
| Career total | | | 173 | 27 | 21 | 7 | 8 | 1 | 2 | 0 | 204 | 35 |

=== International goals ===
As of 18 June 2014
Scores and results list China's goal tally first.

| No | Date | Venue | Opponent | Score | Result | Competition |
|---|---|---|---|---|---|---|
| 1. | 18 June 2014 | Olympic Stadium, Shenyang, China | North Macedonia | 2–0 | 2–0 | Friendly international |

== Honours ==
=== Club ===
Shandong Luneng

- Chinese Super League: 2008, 2010

Shanghai Shenhua

- Chinese FA Cup: 2019

Changchun Yatai

- China League One: 2020
