= Anthony Skorich =

Australian soccer player

Personal information
- Date of birth: 19 March 1990 (age 36)
- Place of birth: Perth, Western Australia
- Height: 1.85 m (6 ft 1 in)
- Position: Striker

Team information
- Current team: Cockburn City

Youth career
- Western Knights
- 2008–2009: Perth Glory

Senior career*
Years	Team	Apps	(Gls)
2007–2008	Western Knights	7	(3)
2008–2011	Perth Glory	17	(1)
2011	Stirling Lions	19	(8)
2012	Bentleigh Greens	6	(1)
2012	Moreland Zebras	8	(1)
2013	Mitra Kukar	3	(0)
2014	Cockburn City	0	(0)
2015	Armadale SC	3	(2)
2015	Cockburn City	0	(0)
2015–2017	Armadale SC	25	(4)
2018–	Cockburn City	66	(12)
- * Club domestic league appearances and goals as of 15 September 2022

Anthony Skorich (born 19 March 1990) is an Australian footballer.

== Biography ==
Skorich was born in Perth. He attended John Curtin College of the Arts and graduated in 2007. In May 2009, Skorich was signed to a professional contract by Perth Glory.

On 15 February 2011, Skorich was released by the Perth Glory.

== A-League career statistics ==
(Correct as of 21 March 2011)

Club	Season	League			Finals			Asia			Total		
Club	Season	Apps	Goals	Assists	Apps	Goals	Assists	Apps	Goals	Assists	Apps	Goals	Assists
Perth Glory	2008–09	4	1	0	-	-	-	-	-	-	4	1	0
Perth Glory	2009–10	0	0	0	-	-	-	-	-	-	0	0	0
Perth Glory	2010–11	13	0	1	-	-	-	-	-	-	13	0	1
Total		17	1	1	-	-	-	-	-	-	17	1	1
