= 2012–13 Brisbane Roar FC season =

Coordinates: 27°27′53″S 153°0′34″E

Brisbane Roar FC
2012–13 season
- Chairman: Dali Tahir
- Manager: Rado Vidošić; Mike Mulvey
- A-League: 5th
- Finals: Equal 3rd
- AFC Champions League: Qualifying Playoff
- Top goalscorer: League: Besart Berisha (14); All: Besart Berisha (14)
- Highest home attendance: League: 22,970; All: 22,970
- Lowest home attendance: League: 9,282; All: 9,282
- Average home league attendance: League: 13,857; All: 13,857
Home colours	Away colours

The 2012–13 Brisbane Roar season was their eighth season in the A-League. As runner up in 2011–12, Brisbane were looking to continue their run of good form in the League, aiming to win their second Premiership. The Roar were also looking to replicate their Championship success which saw them become the first A-League team to win back-to-back Championships. To replicate their 2011–12 success, they would have to make history by making it to the Grand Final, as no team has ever qualified for three consecutive Grand Finals.

As a result of winning the 2012 A-League Grand Final, the Roar competed in the 2013 AFC Champions League for the second time in their history. The Roar were looking to improve on a disappointing debut 2012 ACL campaign, which saw them pick up three points, finishing equal bottom of their group. Following the departure of manager Ange Postecoglou to Melbourne Victory, Rado Vidošić, who had been the clubs' assistant coach for the past seven years, took over as manager for his first full season in charge. After 11 games at the helm, Rado Vidošić was elevated to the Technical Director's role with the club, with former Gold Coast United coach Mike Mulvey taking over as head coach.

== Squad lineup for 2012/13 ==
Correct as of 30 August 2012 – players numbers as per the official Brisbane Roar website
Note: Flags indicate national team as defined under FIFA eligibility rules; some limited exceptions apply. Players may hold more than one non-FIFA nationality.

No.	Pos.	Nation	Player
1	GK	AUS	Michael Theo
2	DF	AUS	Matt Smith (Captain)
3	DF	AUS	Shane Stefanutto (Vice Captain)
4	DF	AUS	Matthew Jurman
5	DF	AUS	Ivan Franjić
6	MF	AUS	Erik Paartalu
7	FW	ALB	Besart Berisha
8	MF	AUS	Massimo Murdocca
9	FW	NED	Stef Nijland
10	FW	BRA	Henrique
11	MF	AUS	Ben Halloran (Youth)
12	MF	AUS	Julius Davies (Youth)
13	DF	AUS	Jade North
14	MF	AUS	Steven Lustica

No.	Pos.	Nation	Player
15	DF	AUS	James Donachie (Youth)
16	FW	KOR	Do Dong-Hyun
17	MF	AUS	Mitch Nichols
18	MF	AUS	Luke Brattan
19	DF	AUS	Jack Hingert (Youth)
20	GK	AUS	Matt Acton (Youth)
21	MF	AUS	James Meyer
22	MF	GER	Thomas Broich
23	FW	AUS	Anthony Proia (Youth)
24	FW	AUS	Nick Fitzgerald (Youth)
25	MF	AUS	George Lambadaridis (Youth)
26	DF	AUS	Corey Brown (Youth)
29	FW	AUS	Kwame Yeboah (Youth)

Successful Trialists

- (South Korea) Do Dong-Hyun
- (Australia) Kwame Yeboah

Unsuccessful Trialists

- (South Korea) Bae Hae-Min

== Transfers and contracts ==
=== New contracts ===
Date	Pos.	Name	Contract (Season end)	Notes
10 September 2012	GK	(Australia) Michael Theo	2016/17	Re-Signing
10 September 2012	DF	(Australia) Matt Smith	2015/16	Re-Signing
10 September 2012	DF	(Australia) Shane Stefanutto	2013/14	Re-Signing
10 September 2012	DF	(Australia) Ivan Franjic	2015/16	Re-Signing
10 September 2012	MF	(Germany) Thomas Broich	2016/17	Re-Signing
10 September 2012	FW	(Brazil) Henrique	2015/16	Re-Signing
21 September 2012	DF	(Australia) James Donachie	2015/16	Re-Signing

=== In ===
Date	Pos.	Name	From	Contract (Season end)	Fee
13 May 2012	MF	(Australia) Ben Halloran	(Australia) Gold Coast United FC	2014/15	Free
10 July 2012	GK	(Australia) Matt Acton	(Australia) Brisbane Roar Youth Team	2013/14	Free
17 July 2012	FW	(South Korea) Do Dong-Hyun	Free Agent	2014/15	Free
30 August 2012	DF	(Japan) Yuji Takahashi	(Japan) Kyoto Sanga FC	2012/13	Loan
8 January 2013	DF	(Australia) Jade North	Free Agent	2015/16	Free
9 January 2013	MF	(Australia) Julius Davies	(Australia) Melbourne Victory	2014/15	Free
23 January 2013	MF	(Australia) Steven Lustica	(Croatia) HNK Hajduk Split	2012/13	Loan
29 January 2013	FW	(Netherlands) Stefan Nijland	(Netherlands) PSV Eindhoven	2012/13	Loan

=== Out ===
Date	Pos.	Name	To	Fee
31 May 2012	GK	(Australia) Andrew Redmayne	(Australia) Melbourne Heart	Bosman
31 May 2012	MF	(Canada) Issey Nakajima-Farran	(Cyprus) AEK Larnaca	Released
31 May 2012	DF	(Australia) Matt Mundy	(Australia) Rochedale Rovers	Released
31 May 2012	DF	(Bahrain) Sayed Mohamed Adnan	(Kuwait) Al-Arabi SC	Contract not renewed
5 August 2012	FW	(Australia) Kofi Danning	(Belgium) C.S. Visé	Free transfer (inter-Bakrie group transfer)
26 December 2012	DF	(Japan) Yuji Takahashi	(Japan) Kyoto Sanga FC	Loan Terminated
8 January 2013	MF	(Australia) Rocky Visconte	(Australia) Western Sydney Wanderers	Released from contract
15 January 2013	MF	(Australia) Erik Paartalu	(China) Tianjin Teda	Undisclosed
23 January 2013	FW	(Australia) Nick Fitzgerald	(Australia) Central Coast Mariners	Contract Mutually Terminated

== Pre-Season and friendlies ==
Pre-Season Friendly; Tuesday, 24 July 2012	Brisbane Olympic (Australia)	0–5	(Australia) Brisbane Roar	Yeronga
19:15 UTC+10:00		(Report)	Berisha 51', 54', 79'; Lambadaridis (??); Defender 75' (o.g.)	Stadium: Goodwin Park; Attendance: Approx. 3,000

Pre-Season Friendly; Sunday, 12 August 2012	Ipswich Select XI (Australia)	1–5	(Australia) Brisbane Roar	Ipswich
15:00 UTC+10:00	Taylor 23'	(Report)	Berisha 60', 72'; Proia 14'; Lambadaridis 65'; Henrique 80'	Stadium: North Ipswich Reserve; Attendance: 2,431

Pre-Season Friendly; Thursday, 16 August 2012	Peninsula Power (Australia)	0–2	(Australia) Brisbane Roar	Kippa-Ring
19:15 UTC+10:00		(Report)	Jurman 17'; Yeboah 49'	Stadium: A.J. Kelly Park; Attendance: Approx. 2,500

Pre-Season Friendly; Wednesday, 22 August 2012	Rochedale Rovers (Australia)	1–1	(Australia) Brisbane Roar	Underwood
19:15 UTC+10:00	McLean 41'	(Report)	Borrello 81'	Stadium: Underwood Park

Pre-Season Friendly; Wednesday, 29 August 2012	Redlands United (Australia)	4–5	(Australia) Brisbane Roar	Cleveland
19:15 UTC+10:00	Meredith 44', 52', 55'; Homer 76'	(Report)	Yeboah 22', 52', 87'; Fitzgerald 81'; Borrello 90'	Stadium: Cleveland Showgrounds

Pre-Season Friendly; Saturday, 1 September 2012	Newcastle Jets (Australia)	1–0	(Australia) Brisbane Roar	Tamworth
19:30 UTC+10:00	Griffiths 20'	(Report)		Stadium: Scully Park

Pre-Season Friendly; Friday, 7 September 2012	Adelaide United (Australia)	6–2	(Australia) Brisbane Roar	Adelaide
20:00 UTC+09:30	Barbiero 22'; Fyfe 27', 33'; Neumann 59'; Ramsay 76' van Dijk 90+3'	(Report)	Visconte 81', 85'	Stadium: Hindmarsh Stadium

Pre-Season Friendly; Sunday, 16 September 2012	Brisbane Roar (Australia)	5–1	(Australia) Sydney FC	Mackay
15:00 UTC+10:00	Broich 26'; Grant 54' (o.g.); Paartalu 75' (pen.); Halloran 78'; Jurman 82'	(Report)	Mallia 45'	Stadium: Virgin Australia Stadium; Attendance: 2,500

Pre-Season Friendly; Sunday, 23 September 2012	Brisbane Roar (Australia)	0–1	(Australia) Central Coast Mariners	Kawana Waters
15:00 UTC+10:00		(Report)	Rogic 80'	Stadium: Stockland Stadium; Attendance: Approx. 3,500; Referee: Chris Beath

== Competitions ==
=== Overall ===
Competition	Started round	Current position / round	Final position / round	First match	Last match
A-League	—	—	5th	7 October 2012	28 March 2013
AFC Champions League	Qualifying Playoff	—	Qualifying Playoff	13 February 2013	13 February 2013
A-League Finals series	Elimination Final	—	Semi-final	7 April 2013	12 April 2013

=== A-League ===
Having been the first signing for former coach Ange Postecoglou, Olyroo international Andrew Redmayne signed a contract with Melbourne Heart on 21 January 2012. Having featured on just 2 occasions for the first team, Redmayne would officially join the Heart on 31 May 2012, citing he needed to play first team football. The Roar would welcome two South Koreans to the club on trial to see if they could potentially be a signing for the club. With one spot left on the visa list with the departure of Canadian Issey Nakajima-Farran, only one could be signed. However, with the trial having finished, neither player was signed and inevitably, both players left the club. With his future in the air and several clubs interested in his services, former Gold Coast United player Ben Halloran would eventually sign with the Roar on a three-year contract on 13 May 2012, with ex Roar coach Postecoglou missing out on his signature. On 15 June, Brisbane Roar W-League coach Jeff Hopkins would be announced as Rado Vidošićs right-hand man for the coming season, with his tactical knowledge and analytical skills being described as excellent and beneficial for everyone at the club. Just 4 days later, The 2012–13 A-League season would be drawn, with a rematch of the previous seasons Grand Final taking place in Perth, with the game taking place at Paterson Stadium. This will see the first time football (soccer) has been played at the stadium since the 2003-04 National Soccer League Preliminary Final which saw the Glory defeat Adelaide United 5–0.

On 9 July 2012, Bahraini central defender Sayed Mohamed Adnan would knock back a contract offer to remain at the Roar, citing the need for him and his family to move back to the Middle East. The leaving of the lanky defender would free up a second Visa spot for the club for the coming season. With this news circulating, the Roar have been rumoured to have a high intention of filling the now open visa position with another foreign defender. Just a day later, the defensive unit at the Roar would get a reprieve with the promotion of Youth League goalkeeper Matt Acton on a 2-year contract. The promotion would see a second goalkeeper join the first team since the departure of Andrew Redmayne. On 17 July 2012, one of the South Koreaans who trialled with the club back in May, Do Dong-Hyun, signed a 3-year contract with the Roar, taking one of the two visa spots left open by the departures of Issey Nakajima-Farran and Sayed Mohamed Adnan. The 19-year-old left winger brings the number of players in the squad to 20. Exactly a week later, the Roar would open their pre-season account against Brisbane Olympic at Goodwin Park in Yeronga. The Roar would turn on the style, easing to victory in a 5–0 romp over the Brisbane Premier League side. A George Lambadaridis header via a cross from new signing Do Dong-Hyun would take the Roar to a 1–0 lead at half time, before a hat-trick by Besart Berisha and an Own goal by an Olympic defender would seal the win in the second half.

On 1 August 2012, Michael Theoklitos would change his surname via deed poll to Michael Theo. Theo would claim that "Around the football traps, I’ve always been known as Michael Theo so I just thought, why not make it official?" Just 4 days later, youngster Kofi Danning would sign with fellow Bakrie Group owned team, Belgian side C.S. Visé on a two-year contract with the option of a third year. On 14 January 2013, Brisbane Roar were knocked out of the 2013 AFC Champions League losing 3–0 on penalties to Buriram United after a scoreless draw. This made them the first ever A-League side to fail to make the group stages of the tournament after getting a Play-off Spot.

==== League table ====
Pos	Team	Pld	W	D	L	GF	GA	GD	Pts	Qualification
1	Western Sydney Wanderers	27	18	3	6	41	21	+20	57	Qualification for 2014 AFC Champions League group stage and finals series
2	Central Coast Mariners (C)	27	16	6	5	48	22	+26	54	Qualification for 2014 AFC Champions League group stage and finals series
3	Melbourne Victory	27	13	5	9	48	45	+3	44	Qualification for 2014 AFC Champions League qualifying play-off and finals series (Note: Since the winner of 2013 A-League Grand Final (Central Coast Mariners) qualified for the 2014 AFC Champions League group stage, the 3rd placed team qualified for the qualifying play-off of 2014 AFC Champions League.)
4	Adelaide United	27	12	5	10	38	37	+1	41	Qualification for Finals series
5	Brisbane Roar	27	10	5	12	33	29	+4	35	Qualification for Finals series
6	Perth Glory	27	9	5	13	29	31	−2	32	Qualification for Finals series
7	Sydney FC	27	9	5	13	41	51	−10	32	
8	Newcastle Jets	27	8	7	12	30	45	−15	31	
9	Melbourne Heart	27	8	3	16	31	40	−9	27	
10	Wellington Phoenix (Note: Wellington Phoenix cannot qualify for the AFC Champions League as they are not recognised as an AFC club.)	27	7	6	14	31	49	−18	27	

Updated to match(es) played on 30 March 2013. Source: ultimatealeague.com
Rules for classification: 1) points; 2) goal difference; 3) number of goals scored.
(C) Champions

==== Matches ====
7 October 2012 Round 1	Perth Glory	1–0	Brisbane Roar	Subiaco, Western Australia
14:00 UTC+08:00	Mehmet 88'; Miller (yellow card) 34'; Burns (yellow card) 81'; Dodd (yellow card) 85'	(Report) (Summary)	Nichols (yellow card) 35'; Stefanutto (yellow card) 45'; Berisha (yellow card) 45+1'	Stadium: Patersons Stadium; Attendance: 14,085; Referee: Ben Williams

13 October 2012 Round 2	Brisbane Roar	5–0	Melbourne Victory	Brisbane, Queensland
18:45 UTC+10:00	Broich 21'; Paartalu 22'; Berisha 63', 90+3'; Nichols 81'; Jurman (yellow card) 14'; Smith (yellow card) 66'; Franjic (yellow card) 75'	(Report) (Summary)	Jeggo (yellow card) 60'; Allsopp (yellow card) 61'; Broxham (yellow card) 87'	Stadium: Suncorp Stadium; Attendance: 17,364; Referee: Strebre Delovski

21 October 2012 Round 3	Wellington Phoenix	1–1	Brisbane Roar	Wellington, New Zealand
16:30 UTC+13:00	Huysegems 16'; Fenton (yellow card) 62'	(Report) (Summary)	Berisha 39'; Stefanutto (yellow card) 18'	Stadium: Westpac Stadium; Attendance: 9,182; Referee: Adam Kersey

27 October 2012 Round 4	Brisbane Roar	0–1	Western Sydney Wanderers	Brisbane, Queensland
18:45 UTC+10:00		(Report) (Summary)	Bridge 19'; Bridge (yellow card) 37'; Mooy (yellow card) 45'; Beauchamp (yellow card) 90'	Stadium: Suncorp Stadium; Attendance: 12,663; Referee: Lucien Laverdure

4 November 2012 Round 5	Brisbane Roar	0–1	Adelaide United	Brisbane, Queensland
16:00 UTC+10:00	Stefanutto (yellow card) 31'	(Report) (Summary)	Vidosic 3'; Van Dijk (yellow card) 32'; Carrusca (yellow card) 37'; Vidosic (yellow card) 72'; Bowles (yellow card) 76'; Galekovic (yellow card) 90+1'	Stadium: Suncorp Stadium; Attendance: 12,856; Referee: Chris Beath

9 November 2012 Round 6	Melbourne Heart	4–1	Brisbane Roar	Melbourne
19:30 UTC+11:00	Gerhardt 19'; Garcia 62'; Tadic 70'; Williams 73'; Garcia (yellow card) 37'; Hoffman (yellow card) 48'; Colosimo (yellow card) 75'	(Report) (Summary)	Henrique 81'; Jurman (yellow card) 9'; Smith (yellow card) 60'	Stadium: AAMI Park; Attendance: 5,466; Referee: Shaun Evans

16 November 2012 Round 7	Brisbane Roar	4–2	Sydney FC	Brisbane, Queensland
19:00 UTC+10:00	Broich 29'; Paartalu 32'; Halloran 44'; Berisha 56'; Paartalu (yellow card) 70'	(Report) (Summary)	Del Piero 41', 48'; Fabio (yellow card) 18'; Ryall (yellow card) 29'; Del Piero (yellow card) 54'; Yau (yellow card) 57'; Emerton (yellow card) 89'; Bosschaart (yellow card) 90+1'	Stadium: Suncorp Stadium; Attendance: 22,970; Referee: Alan Milliner

25 November 2012 Round 8	Central Coast Mariners	2–1	Brisbane Roar	Gosford, New South Wales
17:00 UTC+11:00	Ibini 4'; Rogić 81'; McBreen (yellow card) 34'; Bojić (yellow card) 79'; Hutchinson (yellow card) 87'	(Report) (Summary)	Murdocca 32'; Berisha (yellow card) 34'; Jurman (yellow card) 79'; Nichols (yellow card) 89'	Stadium: Bluetongue Stadium; Attendance: 9,084; Referee: Chris Beath

1 December 2012 Round 9	Brisbane Roar	1–0	Newcastle Jets	Brisbane, Queensland
18:45 UTC+10:00	Berisha 39' (pen.); ~~Broich (red card) 43'~~ (expunged)	(Report) (Summary)	Mitchell (yellow card) 39' (red card) 43'; Neville (yellow card) 18'; Zadkovich (yellow card) 29'; Chapman (yellow card) 44'; Griffiths (yellow card) 48'; Ritter (yellow card) 90'	Stadium: Suncorp Stadium; Attendance: 12,546; Referee: Brenton Hayward

9 December 2012 Round 10	Western Sydney Wanderers	1–0	Brisbane Roar	Parramatta, New South Wales
17:00 UTC+11:00	Ono 39' (pen.); Hersi (yellow card) 27'; D'Apuzzo (yellow card) 62'	(Report) (Summary)	Stefanutto (yellow card) 26'; Nichols (yellow card) 65'; Jurman (yellow card) 85'; Theo (yellow card) 86'	Stadium: Parramatta Stadium; Attendance: 6,755; Referee: Alan Milliner

15 December 2012 Round 11	Melbourne Victory	1–1	Brisbane Roar	Melbourne
17:30 UTC+11:00	Milligan 48'; Celeski (yellow card) 22'; Milligan (yellow card) 28'; Broxham (yellow card) 69'	(Report) (Summary)	Halloran 24'; Berisha (yellow card) 42'	Stadium: AAMI Park; Attendance: 17,128; Referee: Jarred Gillett

21 December 2012 Round 12	Brisbane Roar	0–1	Perth Glory	Brisbane, Queensland
20:00 UTC+10:00	Paartalu (yellow card) 47'	(Report) (Summary)	McGarry 44'; Risdon (yellow card) 33'; Jamieson (yellow card) 74'; McGarry (yellow card) 79'	Stadium: Suncorp Stadium; Attendance: 11,352; Referee: Peter Green

26 December 2012 Round 13	Adelaide United	0–1	Brisbane Roar	Adelaide, South Australia
19:00 UTC+10:30	Jerónimo (yellow card) 17'; Fyfe (yellow card) 40'; Bowles (yellow card) 42'	(Report) (Summary)	Henrique 64'; Smith (yellow card) 24'; Henrique (yellow card) 30'; Theo (yellow card) 45'; Paartalu (yellow card) 52'; Halloran (yellow card) 89'	Stadium: Hindmarsh Stadium; Attendance: 11,035; Referee: Adam Kersey

1 January 2013 Round 14	Brisbane Roar	2–1	Wellington Phoenix	Brisbane, Queensland
19:30 UTC+10:00	Berisha 14'; Halloran 57'; Donachie (yellow card) 39' (yellow-red card) 84'; Paartalu (yellow card) 35'; Berisha (yellow card) 74'	(Report) (Summary)	Brockie 35'; Boyd (yellow card) 45' (yellow-red card) 63'	Stadium: Suncorp Stadium; Attendance: 11,358; Referee: Tim McGilchrist

6 January 2013 Round 15	Melbourne Heart	3–2	Brisbane Roar	Melbourne
16:00 UTC+11:00	Williams 13'; Tadić 35'; Fred 53'; Williams (red card) 67'; Behich (yellow card) 49'; Garcia (yellow card) 65'; Redmayne (yellow card) 66'	(Report) (Summary)	Berisha 74' (pen.), 76'; Halloran (yellow card) 19'	Stadium: AAMI Park; Referee: Alan Milliner

12 January 2013 Round 16	Newcastle Jets	1–0	Brisbane Roar	Newcastle, New South Wales
19:45 UTC+11:00	Griffiths 48'; Regan (yellow card) 1'; Griffiths (yellow card) 45'; Virgili (yellow card) 56'	(Report) (Summary)	Fitzgerald (yellow card) 25'	Stadium: Hunter Stadium; Attendance: 10,164; Referee: Strebre Delovski

20 January 2013 Round 17	Brisbane Roar	1–2	Western Sydney Wanderers	Brisbane, Queensland
16:00 UTC+10:00	Nichols 22'; Berisha (yellow card) 70'; Stefanutto (yellow card) 72'	(Report) (Summary)	Bridge 65'; Hersi 69'	Stadium: Suncorp Stadium; Attendance: 11,917; Referee: Matthew Gillett

26 January 2013 Round 18	Perth Glory	0–1	Brisbane Roar	Perth, Western Australia
Saturday 18:45 AWST	McGarry (yellow card) 24'	(Report) (Summary)	Meyer 15'; Halloran (yellow card) 39'; Meyer (yellow card) 51'; Hingert (yellow card) 71'	Stadium: nib Stadium, Perth; Attendance: 4,821; Referee: Alan Milliner

1 February 2013 Round 19	Brisbane Roar	2–2	Central Coast Mariners	Brisbane, Queensland
Friday 19:00 AEST	Berisha 47', 69'; Berisha (yellow card) 12'; Jurman (yellow card) 30'; Lustica (yellow card) 33'; Franjic (yellow card) 41'; Stefanutto (yellow card) 81'	(Report) (Summary)	McGlinchey 8'; McBreen 80'; Bozanic (yellow card) 30'; Sainsbury (yellow card) 53'; McGlinchey (yellow card) 85'	Stadium: Suncorp Stadium, Brisbane; Attendance: 10,604; Referee: Lucien Laverdure

10 February 2013 Round 20	Sydney FC	2–1	Brisbane Roar	Sydney
17:00 UTC+11:00	Del Piero 7'; Triantis 69'; Emerton (yellow card) 14'; Janjetović (yellow card) 44'; Abbas (yellow card) 48'; Chianese (yellow card) 79'	(Report) (Summary)	Berisha 45' (pen.); North (yellow card) 34'; Berisha (yellow card) 87'	Stadium: Allianz Stadium; Attendance: 14,589; Referee: Ben Williams

17 February 2013 Round 21	Brisbane Roar	2–0	Wellington Phoenix	Brisbane, Queensland
16:00 UTC+10:00	Lustica 32'; Berisha 48'	(Report) (Summary)	Gameiro (yellow card) 37'; Sigmund (yellow card) 72'; Sánchez (yellow card) 82'	Stadium: Suncorp Stadium; Attendance: 9,282; Referee: Alan Milliner

22 February 2013 Round 22	Newcastle Jets	0–0	Brisbane Roar	Newcastle, New South Wales
19:30 UTC+11:00	Zadkovich (yellow card) 22'; Galloway (yellow card) 33'; Bridges (yellow card) 54'; Caravella (yellow card) 55'	(Report) (Summary)	Nijland (yellow card) 34'; Stefanutto (yellow card) 72'; Nichols (yellow card) 90'	Stadium: Hunter Stadium; Attendance: 8,310; Referee: Lucien Laverdure

2 March 2013 Round 23	Adelaide United	0–1	Brisbane Roar	Adelaide, South Australia
17:00 UTC+10:30	Malik (yellow card) 51' (red card) 90'	(Report) (Summary)	Halloran 82'; Hingert (yellow card) 21'; Brattan (yellow card) 43'; Franjic (yellow card) 49'	Stadium: Hindmarsh Stadium; Attendance: 6,878; Referee: Shaun Evans

9 March 2013 Round 24	Brisbane Roar	1–1	Melbourne Victory	Brisbane, Queensland
18:45 UTC+10:00	Franjic 59'; Brattan (yellow card) 63'; Halloran (yellow card) 90'	(Report) (Summary)	Broxham 11' (yellow card) 90'; Milligan (yellow card) 60'; Leijer (yellow card) 84'	Stadium: Suncorp Stadium; Attendance: 12,624; Referee: Peter Green

17 March 2013 Round 25	Central Coast Mariners	1–0	Brisbane Roar	Gosford, New South Wales
17:00 UTC+11:00	Ibini 33'; Hutchinson (yellow card) 85'	(Report) (Summary)	Hingert (yellow card) 35'; Donachie (yellow card) 90'	Stadium: Bluetongue Stadium; Attendance: 7,225; Referee: Alan Milliner

24 March 2013 Round 26	Brisbane Roar	2–0	Melbourne Heart	Brisbane, Queensland
16:00 UTC+10:00	Berisha 12' (pen.); Broich 31'; Brattan (yellow card) 69'	(Report) (Summary)	Meeuwis (yellow card) 13'; Williams (yellow card) 34'; Coyne (yellow card) 34'; Vranković (yellow card) 67'	Stadium: Suncorp Stadium; Attendance: 9,869; Referee: Matt Gillett

28 March 2013 Round 27	Brisbane Roar	3–1	Sydney FC	Brisbane, Queensland
19:00 UTC+10:00	Berisha 29'; Lustica 51'; Franjic 79'; Theo (yellow card) 84'	(Report) (Summary)	Del Piero 84'; Triantis (yellow card) 29'; Grant (yellow card) 53'; Griffiths (yellow card) 69'; Calvano (yellow card) 78'	Stadium: Suncorp Stadium; Attendance: 19,010; Referee: Peter Green

=== A-League Finals series ===
7 April 2013 Elimination Final #2	Adelaide United	1–2	Brisbane Roar	Adelaide, South Australia
16:30 ACST	Vidosic 88'; Jerónimo (yellow card) 31'; Fyfe (yellow card) 56'; Ferreira (yellow card) 72'; Carrusca (yellow card) 78'; Juric (yellow card) 85'; Cássio (yellow card) 88'	(Report) (Summary)	Brattan 27'; Franjic 45'; Brattan (yellow card) 38'; Lustica (yellow card) 60'; Nijland (yellow card) 75'	Stadium: Hindmarsh Stadium; Attendance: 10,234; Referee: Chris Beath

12 April 2013 Semi-final #1	Western Sydney Wanderers	2–0	Brisbane Roar	Sydney
19:30 AEST	Kresinger 15'; Ono 70'; Hersi (yellow card) 33' (yellow-red card) 77'; Beauchamp (yellow card) 51'; Trifiro (yellow card) 85'	(Report) (Summary)	Nichols (yellow card) 36'; Donachie (yellow card) 53'; Brattan (yellow card) 72'; Berisha (yellow card) 86'	Stadium: Parramatta Stadium; Attendance: 19,389; Referee: Alan Milliner

=== 2013 Asian Champions League ===
Brisbane initially qualified for the 2013 AFC Champions League as a result of winning the 2012 A-League Grand Final, qualifying for the Group stage. However, on 29 November 2012, the Asian Football Confederation cut Australia's initial 2 direct group stage slots and 1 play-off slot to just 1 direct group stage and 1 play-off slot for the Asian Champions League. As a result of that, the Roar's direct group stage was removed, leaving the two time A-League champions with a play-off spot. Since the Central Coast Mariners won the premier's plate as a result of finishing first in the regular season, the Mariners would take the direct group stage slot.

Despite earning the right to host the match courtesy of Australia's higher points ranking during the Asian Football Confederation’s evaluation process, Brisbane was forced to seek a change of match day for the fixture. With Suncorp Stadium unavailable on the matchday designated by the AFC and a Hyundai A-League match scheduled the next day, Brisbane sought to have the matchday officially changed by the AFC. The club were told in response the calendar had been finalised and could not be altered.

==== Play-off ====
13 February 2013 Play-off	Buriram United (Thailand)	0–0 (a.e.t.) (3–0 p)	(Australia) Brisbane Roar	Buriram, Thailand
Wednesday, 18:00 ICT	Chappuis (yellow card) 97'; Anawin (yellow card) 116'	Report	Donachie (yellow card) 13'; Nijland (yellow card) 35'; Broich (yellow card) 38'; Berisha (yellow card) 89'	Stadium: New I-Mobile Stadium; Attendance: 14,482; Referee: Kim Dong-Jin (South Korea)
	Penalties
	Osmar (penalty scored); Chappuis (penalty scored); Jirawat (penalty scored)		(penalty missed) Broich; (penalty missed) Berisha; (penalty missed) Meyer

== Statistics ==
=== Squad statistics ===
Statistics accurate as of 12 April 2013
90 Minutes played is counted as a full game. Injury Time is not counted. A sub's appearance is counted up to the 90th minute as well. If a substitution is made during extra time, it is counted as a full game (90mins) to the player that started. The substitute is credited with the number of minutes made up from 30 seconds for every substitution in the game by both teams combined. If there is an uneven number of substitutions made in total, the number of minutes is rounded up to the following number (2.5 mins = 3 mins).
A-League Games played: 27
ACL Games played: 1
Finals series Games played: 2

Player has departed the club mid season
Player has joined the club mid season

No.	Nat.	Name	Contract	League				Finals				Asia				Total				Notes
No.	Nat.	Name	Contract	Start	Sub	Mins.	Goal	Start	Sub	Mins.	Goal	Start	Sub	Mins.	Goal	Start	Sub	Mins.	Goal	Notes
Goalkeepers
1	(Australia)	Michael Theo	2016/17	27	–	2430	–	2	–	180	–	1	–	120	–	30	–	2730	–	^{[5]}
20	(Australia)	Matt Acton	2013/14	–	–	–	–	–	–	–	–	–	–	–	–	–	–	–	–	
Defenders
2	(Australia)	Matt Smith	2015/16	14	–	1260	–	–	–	–	–	–	–	–	–	14	–	1260	–	
3	(Australia)	Shane Stefanutto	2013/14	26	–	2310	–	2	–	180	–	1	–	120	–	29	–	2610	–	^{[5]}
4	(Australia)	Matthew Jurman	2012/13	12	3	1044	–	–	–	–	–	–	–	–	–	12	3	1044	–	
5	(Australia)	Ivan Franjic	2015/16	21	–	1871	2	2	–	180	1	1	–	37	–	24	–	2088	3	^{[5]}
13	(Japan)	Yuji Takahashi	2012/13	–	4	11	–	–	–	–	–	–	–	–	–	–	4	11	–	^{[1]} ^{[2]}
13	(Australia)	Jade North	2015/16	8	–	707	–	2	–	180	–	1	–	120	–	11	–	1007	–	^{[5]}
15	(Australia)	James Donachie	2015/16	15	1	1366	–	2	–	180	–	1	–	120	–	18	1	1666	–	^{[5]}
19	(Australia)	Jack Hingert	2012/13	16	4	1420	–	1	–	66	–	–	1	83	–	17	5	1569	–	^{[1]} ^{[2]} ^{[5]} ^{[6]}
26	(Australia)	Corey Brown	2012/13	2	2	203	–	–	–	–	–	–	–	–	–	2	2	203	–	
Midfielders
6	(Australia)	Erik Paartalu	2012/13	16	–	1393	2	–	–	–	–	–	–	–	–	16	–	1393	2	
8	(Australia)	Massimo Murdocca	2013/14	16	5	1290	1	–	2	19	–	–	–	–	–	16	7	1309	1	^{[3]}
11	(Australia)	Ben Halloran	2014/15	17	9	1692	4	1	1	127	–	1	–	116	–	19	10	1935	4	^{[5]} ^{[6]}
12	(Australia)	Julius Doe	2014/15	–	2	13	–	–	–	–	–	–	–	–	–	–	2	13	–	^{[4]}
14	(Australia)	Rocky Visconte	2012/13	–	–	–	–	–	–	–	–	–	–	–	–	–	–	–	–	
14	(Australia)	Steven Lustica	2012/13	8	2	692	2	2	–	165	–	–	1	6	–	10	3	863	2	^{[5]}
17	(Australia)	Mitch Nichols	2012/13	18	6	1714	2	2	–	180	–	1	–	120	–	21	6	2014	2	^{[4]} ^{[5]}
18	(Australia)	Luke Brattan	2012/13	11	4	926	–	2	–	176	1	1	–	120	–	14	4	1222	1	^{[5]}
21	(Australia)	James Meyer	2012/13	1	4	116	1	–	–	–	–	–	1	4	–	1	5	120	1	^{[5]}
22	(Germany)	Thomas Broich	2016/17	27	–	2383	3	2	–	114	–	1	–	120	–	30	–	2617	3	^{[5]}
25	(Australia)	George Lambadaridis	2012/13	–	3	69	–	–	–	–	–	–	–	–	–	–	3	69	–	
Forwards
7	(Albania)	Besart Berisha	2013/14	25	–	2206	14	2	–	180	–	1	–	120	–	28	–	2506	14	^{[3]} ^{[5]}
9	(Netherlands)	Stef Nijland	2012/13	5	3	469	–	–	2	45	–	1	–	114	–	6	5	628	–	^{[5]}
10	(Brazil)	Henrique	2015/16	9	7	766	2	–	–	–	–	–	–	–	–	9	7	766	2	
16	(South Korea)	Do Dong-Hyun	2014/15	–	3	37	–	–	–	–	–	–	–	–	–	–	3	37	–	
23	(Australia)	Anthony Proia	2013/14	–	–	–	–	–	–	–	–	–	–	–	–	–	–	–	–	
24	(Australia)	Nick Fitzgerald	2012/13	2	9	305	–	–	–	–	–	–	–	–	–	2	9	305	–	
27	(Australia)	Kwame Yeboah	??/??	–	1	1	–	–	1	8	–	–	–	–	–	–	2	9	–	

- ^{[1]} – Yuji Takahashi replaced Jack Hingert in the 90th minute vs Wellington Phoenix (Rnd 3). 5 substitutions were made in total
- ^{[2]} – Yuji Takahashi replaced Jack Hingert in the 90th minute vs Newcastle Jets (Rnd 9). 6 substitutions were made in total
- ^{[3]} – Massimo Murdocca replaced Besart Berisha in the 90th minute vs Adelaide United (Rnd 12). 5 substitutions were made in total
- ^{[4]} – Julius Doe replaced Mitch Nichols in the 90th minute vs Perth Glory (Rnd 18). 6 substitutions were made in total
- ^{[5]} – The 2013 AFC Champions League qualifying play-off game between Buriram United and Brisbane Roar went to Extra Time, equating to 120 minutes (90min + 2x15min halves)
- ^{[6]} – Ben Halloran replaced Jack Hingert in the 90th minute vs Melbourne Heart (Round 26). 5 substitutions were made in total

=== Disciplinary record ===
Correct as of 12 April 2013 (End of Season)

#	Nat.	Pos.	Name	League		Finals		Asia		Total	
#	Nat.	Pos.	Name	Yellow card	Red card	Yellow card	Red card	Yellow card	Red card	Yellow card	Red card
7	(Albania)	FW	Besart Berisha	7 ^{[3]}	–	1	–	1	–	9	–
3	(Australia)	DF	Shane Stefanutto	7 ^{[3]}	–	–	–	–	–	7	–
15	(Australia)	DF	James Donachie	3 ^{[2]}	1	1	–	1	–	5 ^{[2]}	1
4	(Australia)	DF	Matt Jurman	5 ^{[4]}	–	–	–	–	–	5	–
18	(Australia)	MF	Luke Brattan	3	–	2	–	–	–	5	-
17	(Australia)	MF	Mitch Nichols	4	–	1	–	–	–	5	–
6	(Australia)	MF	Erik Paartalu	4	–	–	–	–	–	4	–
11	(Australia)	MF	Ben Halloran	4	–	–	–	–	–	4	–
2	(Australia)	DF	Matt Smith	3	–	–	–	–	–	3	–
19	(Australia)	DF	Jack Hingert	3	–	–	–	–	–	3	–
9	(Netherlands)	FW	Stef Nijland	1	–	1	–	1	–	3	–
1	(Australia)	GK	Michael Theo	3	–	–	–	–	–	3	–
5	(Australia)	DF	Ivan Franjic	3	–	–	–	–	–	3	–
14	(Australia)	MF	Steven Lustica	1	–	1	–	–	–	2	–
10	(Brazil)	FW	Henrique	1	–	–	–	–	–	1	–
24	(Australia)	FW	Nick Fitzgerald	1	–	–	–	–	–	1	–
21	(Australia)	MF	James Meyer	1	–	–	–	–	–	1	–
13	(Australia)	DF	Jade North	1	–	–	–	–	–	1	–
22	(Germany)	MF	Thomas Broich	–	0	–	–	1	–	1	0 ^{[1]}
			TOTALS	55	1	7	–	4	–	66	1 ^{[1]}

^{[1]} Thomas Broich had his straight red card rescinded from the Rnd 9 game vs Newcastle Jets on Saturday, 1 December 2012
^{[2]} James Donachie received 2 yellow cards resulting in a red card from the Rnd 14 game vs Wellington Phoenix on Tuesday, 1 January 2013
^{[3]} Shane Stefanutto & Besart Berisha both received their 5th yellow cards of the season resulting in a 1-game suspension per FFA rules, from the Rnd 17 game vs Western Sydney Wanderers on Sunday, 20 January 2013
^{[4]} Matt Jurman received his 5th yellow card of the season resulting in a 1-game suspension per FFA rules, from the Rnd 19 game vs Central Coast Mariners on Friday, 1 February 2013

=== League Goalscorers by round ===
Total	Player		Goals per Round																												
Total	Player		1	2	3	4	5	6	7	8	9	10	11	12	13	14	15	16	17	18	19	20	21	22	23	24	25	26	27	KOF	SF1
14	(Albania)	Besart Berisha		2	1				1		1					1	2				2	1	1					1	1		
4	(Australia)	Ben Halloran							1				1			1									1						
3	(Germany)	Thomas Broich		1					1																			1			
3	(Australia)	Ivan Franjic																								1			1	1	
2	(Australia)	Steven Lustica																					1						1		
2	(Australia)	Erik Paartalu		1					1																						
2	(Brazil)	Henrique						1							1																
2	(Australia)	Mitch Nichols		1															1												
1	(Australia)	Massimo Murdocca								1																					
1	(Australia)	James Meyer																		1											
1	(Australia)	Luke Brattan																												1	
35	TOTAL		0	5	1	0	0	1	4	1	1	0	1	0	1	2	2	0	1	1	2	1	2	0	1	1	0	2	3	2	0

 A goal was scored from a penalty kick
 Two goals were scored from penalty kicks
 Players were not selected in matchday squad or used as a substitute for highlighted round i.e. did not make an appearance

== Home attendance ==
Win Draw Loss
League attendance and average includes Finals series

Competition	Round	Date	Score	Opponent	Attendance
A-League	2	13 October 2012	5–0	Melbourne Victory	17,364
A-League	4	27 October 2012	0–1	Western Sydney Wanderers	12,663
A-League	5	4 November 2012	0–1	Adelaide United	12,856
A-League	7	16 November 2012	4–2	Sydney FC	22,970
A-League	9	1 December 2012	1–0	Newcastle Jets	12,546
A-League	12	21 December 2012	0–1	Perth Glory	11,352
A-League	14	1 January 2013	4–2	Wellington Phoenix	11,358
A-League	17	20 January 2013	1–2	Western Sydney Wanderers	11,917
A-League	19	1 February 2013	2–2	Central Coast Mariners	10,604
A-League	21	17 February 2013	2–0	Wellington Phoenix	9,282
A-League	24	9 March 2013	1–1	Melbourne Victory	12,624
A-League	26	24 March 2013	2–0	Melbourne Heart	9,869
A-League	27	28 March 2013	3–1	Sydney FC	19,010
				Total Attendance	174,415
				Total Average Attendance	13,417

== See also ==
- Brisbane Roar FC records and statistics
- List of Brisbane Roar FC players
- Brisbane Roar end of season awards
- 2013 AFC Champions League
- Brisbane Roar website
- A-League website
