= 2013–14 Sydney FC season =

Sydney FC
2013–14 season
- Chairman: Scott Barlow
- Manager: Frank Farina
- A-League: 5th (League); Elimination final (Finals)
- Top goalscorer: Alessandro Del Piero (10)
Home colours	Away colours	Third colours

The 2013–14 season is Sydney FC's ninth consecutive season in the A-League since its foundation season in 2005–2006.

== Players ==
=== Squad ===
Note: Flags indicate national team as defined under FIFA eligibility rules; some limited exceptions apply. Players may hold more than one non-FIFA nationality.

No.	Pos.	Nation	Player
1	GK	AUS	Vedran Janjetovic
2	DF	AUS	Sebastian Ryall
3	DF	AUS	Marc Warren
4	FW	SRB	Ranko Despotović
5	DF	AUS	Matthew Jurman
6	DF	SRB	Nikola Petković
8	DF	AUS	Pedj Bojić
9	FW	AUS	Corey Gameiro
10	FW	ITA	Alessandro Del Piero (Captain)
11	FW	AUS	Richard Garcia
12	FW	AUS	Blake Powell
13	DF	AUS	Saša Ognenovski
14	FW	AUS	Mitchell Mallia (Youth)

No.	Pos.	Nation	Player
15	MF	NIR	Terry McFlynn (Vice-Captain)
16	MF	AUS	Joel Chianese
17	MF	AUS	Terry Antonis
18	MF	AUS	Peter Triantis
19	MF	AUS	Nick Carle
20	GK	AUS	Vedran Janjetović
21	MF	SRB	Miloš Dimitrijević
22	MF	IRQ	Ali Abbas
23	MF	AUS	Rhyan Grant
24	MF	AUS	Hagi Gligor (Youth)
25	DF	AUS	Daniel Petkovski (Youth)
27	MF	AUS	Chris Naumoff (Youth)
28	MF	AUS	Matt Thompson

== Transfers ==
=== Winter ===
==== In ====
Note: Flags indicate national team as defined under FIFA eligibility rules; some limited exceptions apply. Players may hold more than one non-FIFA nationality.

No.	Pos.	Nation	Player
5	DF	AUS	Matthew Jurman
19	MF	AUS	Nick Carle (Loan return from (United Arab Emirates) Baniyas)
3	DF	AUS	Marc Warren
13	DF	BRA	Tiago
8	DF	AUS	Pedj Bojić
9	FW	AUS	Corey Gameiro
21	FW	PAN	Yairo Yau (Loan extension)
11	FW	AUS	Richard Garcia (from (Australia) Melbourne Heart)
6	DF	SRB	Nikola Petković (from (Serbia) Red Star Belgrade)
28	MF	AUS	Matt Thompson (Injury cover)
4	FW	SRB	Ranko Despotović

==== Out ====
Note: Flags indicate national team as defined under FIFA eligibility rules; some limited exceptions apply. Players may hold more than one non-FIFA nationality.

No.	Pos.	Nation	Player
33	GK	AUS	Matthew Nash (Released)
5	DF	AUS	Nathan Sherlock (Released)
8	DF	AUS	Adam Griffiths (Released)
9	MF	AUS	Paul Reid (Released)
11	FW	AUS	Jarrod Kyle (Released)
18	DF	AUS	Trent McClenahan (Released)
19	FW	CRO	Krunoslav Lovrek (Released)
3	DF	BRA	Fabinho (Released)
29	FW	AUS	Joel Griffiths (Released)
32	DF	AUS	Lucas Neill (Released)
4	DF	NED	Pascal Bosschaart (Released)

=== Summer ===
==== In ====
Note: Flags indicate national team as defined under FIFA eligibility rules; some limited exceptions apply. Players may hold more than one non-FIFA nationality.

No.	Pos.	Nation	Player
28	MF	AUS	Matt Thompson (Injury cover)
21	MF	SRB	Miloš Dimitrijević
13	DF	AUS	Saša Ognenovski

==== Out ====
Note: Flags indicate national team as defined under FIFA eligibility rules; some limited exceptions apply. Players may hold more than one non-FIFA nationality.

No.	Pos.	Nation	Player
21	FW	PAN	Yairo Yau (Loan terminated)
7	MF	AUS	Brett Emerton (Retired)
13	DF	BRA	Tiago (Released)

== Preseason and friendlies ==
10 July 2013 Friendly	Belmore United (Australia)	0–6	(Australia) Sydney FC	Sydney, Australia
17:30		Report	Emerton 5'; Grant 12'; Naumoff 60', 74'; Mallia 67'; Abbas 68'	Stadium: Olympic Park Athletic Centre; Attendance: 1,000

16 July 2013 Friendly	Sydney University (Australia)	1–7	(Australia) Sydney FC	Sydney, Australia
		Report	Mallia 5'; Gameiro 22', 30'; Chianese 40', 44'; Naumoff 75', 82'	Stadium: Macquarie University

24 July 2013 Japan Tour	Sagan Tosu (Japan)	2–1	(Australia) Sydney FC	Tosu, Japan
	Mizunuma 1', 41'	Report	Grant 24'	Stadium: Tosu Stadium; Attendance: 21,000

31 July 2013 Friendly	Macarthur Rams (Australia)	1–1	(Australia) Sydney FC	Campbelltown, Australia
19:30	Malmierca 53'	Report	Naumoff 65'	Stadium: Campbelltown Stadium; Attendance: 2,324; Referee: Kris Griffiths-Jones

7 August 2013 Italy Tour	Padova (Italy)	3–2	(Australia) Sydney FC	Padova, Italy
4:45am (AEST)	Vantaggiato 4', 15'; Jelenic 81'	Report	Emerton 8'; Carle 84' (pen.)	Stadium: Stadio Euganeo; Attendance: 15,688

8 August 2013 Italy Tour	Udinese (Italy)	3–5	(Australia) Sydney FC	Jesolo, Italy
1am (AEST)	Unknown 2'; Unknown 40'; Unknown 48'	Report	Mallia 10', 55'; Marschel 12'; Chianese 30', 89'	Stadium: Stadio Comunale Picchi; Attendance: 3,502

13 August 2013 Italy Tour	Vicenza (Italy)	1–3	(Australia) Sydney FC	Jesolo, Italy
2am (AEST)	Coser 47'	Report	Chianese 33'; Ryall 40'; Mallia 80'	Stadium: Stadio Comunale Picchi; Attendance: 3,031

14 August 2013 Italy Tour	A.S. Cittadella (Italy)	0–1	(Australia) Sydney FC	Jesolo, Italy
1am (AEST)		Report	Italiano 35'	Stadium: Stadio Comunale Picchi; Attendance: 3,121

17 August 2013 Italy Tour	Venezia (Italy)	1–0	(Australia) Sydney FC	Jesolo, Italy
2am (AEST)	Bocalon 3'	Report		Stadium: Stadio Comunale Picchi; Attendance: 4,012

21 August 2013 Italy Tour	Reggiana (Italy)	2–2	(Australia) Sydney FC	Reggio Emilia, Italy
5am (AEST)	Cais 8'; Viapiana 16'	Report	Gameiro 56'; Carle 59' (pen.)	Stadium: Mapei Stadium; Attendance: 6,873

7 September 2013 Friendly	Sydney FC	0–3	Wellington Phoenix	Sydney, Australia
Saturday 14:00 AEDT		Report	Cunningham 37'; H. Watson 75'; Ifill 76'	Stadium: Winter Field

11 September 2013 Friendly	St George (Australia)	2–1	(Australia) Sydney FC	Sydney, Australia
7:00	Chevaz 15' (pen.); Messam 89'	Report	Tratt 75'	Stadium: Jubilee Oval

14 September 2013 Friendly	Sydney FC	0–1	Newcastle Jets	Wollongong, Australia
17:30		Report	Virgili 53'	Stadium: WIN Stadium; Attendance: 6,450

22 September 2013 Friendly	Brisbane Roar	4–1	Sydney FC	Cairns, Australia
Sunday 15:00 AEST	Yeboah 1', 51'; C. Brown 9'; Berisha 48'	Report	Chianese 70'	Stadium: Barlow Park; Attendance: 4,707

29 September 2013 Friendly	Sydney FC	0–3	Perth Glory	Sydney, Australia
Sunday 16:00 AEST		Report	Maclaren 15', 89'; Sidnei 48'	Stadium: Jubilee Oval; Referee: Alan Milliner

== Competitions ==
=== Overall ===
Competition	Started round	Current position / round	Final position / round	First match	Last match
A-League	—	—	5th	11 October 2013	13 April 2014
National Youth League	—	1st	Premiers	27 October 2013	2 March 2014
Thanh Niên Cup	Group stage	Final	Runners-up	14 October 2013	23 October 2013

=== A-League ===
==== League table ====
Pos	Team	Pld	W	D	L	GF	GA	GD	Pts	Qualification
1	Brisbane Roar (C)	27	16	4	7	43	25	+18	52	Qualificaition for 2015 AFC Champions League group stage and finals series
2	Western Sydney Wanderers	27	11	9	7	34	29	+5	42	Qualificaition for 2015 AFC Champions League group stage and finals series
3	Central Coast Mariners	27	12	6	9	33	36	−3	42	Qualification for 2015 AFC Champions League qualifying play-off and finals series (Note: Since the winner of 2014 A-League Grand Final (Brisbane Roar) qualified for the 2015 AFC Champions League group stage, the 2nd and 3rd placed teams qualified for the group stage and the qualifying play-off of 2015 AFC Champions League.)
4	Melbourne Victory	27	11	8	8	42	43	−1	41	Qualification for Finals series
5	Sydney FC	27	12	3	12	40	38	+2	39	Qualification for Finals series
6	Adelaide United	27	10	8	9	45	36	+9	38	Qualification for Finals series
7	Newcastle Jets	27	10	6	11	34	34	0	36	
8	Perth Glory	27	7	7	13	28	37	−9	28	
9	Wellington Phoenix (Note: Wellington Phoenix cannot qualify for the AFC Champions League as they are not recognised as an AFC club.)	27	7	7	13	36	51	−15	28	
10	Melbourne Heart	27	6	8	13	36	42	−6	26	

Updated to match(es) played on 13 April 2014. Source: ultimatealeague.com
Rules for classification: 1) points; 2) goal difference; 3) number of goals scored.
(C) Champions

==== Results summary ====
Overall								Home						Away					
Pld	W	D	L	GF	GA	GD	Pts	W	D	L	GF	GA	GD	W	D	L	GF	GA	GD
27	12	3	12	40	38	+2	39	9	1	4	25	20	+5	3	2	8	15	18	−3

Last updated: 14 April 2014.
Source: Competitive Matches

==== Results by round ====
Round	1	2	3	4	5	6	7	8	9	10	11	12	13	14	15	16	17	18	19	20	21	22	23	24	25	26	27
Ground	H	A	H	A	H	A	H	H	A	H	A	H	A	A	H	A	A	H	H	A	A	H	H	A	A	H	H
Result	W	L	L	L	W	W	W	W	L	W	L	L	D	L	L	W	L	L	W	W	L	W	D	L	D	W	W
Position	2	3	7	8	7	5	4	3	4	3	5	6	5	7	8	5	5	7	6	4	6	4	5	7	6	6	5

Source: Matches
A = Away; H = Home; W = Win; D = Draw; L = Loss

==== Matches ====
11 October 2013 1	Sydney FC	2–0	Newcastle Jets	Sydney
Friday 19:30 AEDT	Del Piero 37'; Chianese 60'	Report		Stadium: Allianz Stadium; Attendance: 20,103; Referee: Jarred Gillett

19 October 2013 2	Brisbane Roar	4–0	Sydney FC	Brisbane
Saturday 19:30 AEST	Smith 37'; Henrique 39'; North 44'; Broich 80'	Report		Stadium: Suncorp Stadium; Attendance: 21,841; Referee: Peter Green

26 October 2013 3	Sydney FC	0–2	Western Sydney Wanderers	Sydney
Saturday 19:30		Report	La Rocca 11'; Ono 26'	Stadium: Allianz Stadium; Attendance: 40,388; Referee: Strebre Delovski

2 November 2013 4	Perth Glory	1–0	Sydney FC	Perth
Saturday 17:30	McGarry 9' (pen.)	Report		Stadium: nib Stadium; Attendance: 10,613; Referee: Ben Williams

9 November 2013 5	Sydney FC	3–2	Melbourne Victory	Sydney
Saturday 19:30	Garcia 3'; Ryall 15'; Warren (red card) 25'; Del Piero 37' (pen.)	Report	A. Thompson 17'; Troisi 27'	Stadium: Allianz Stadium; Attendance: 18,784; Referee: Peter Green

15 November 2013 6	Melbourne Heart	0–2	Sydney FC	Melbourne
Friday 19:30		Report	Del Piero 26' (pen.); Chianese 45+1'	Stadium: AAMI Park; Attendance: 8,941; Referee: Alan Milliner

23 November 2013 7	Sydney FC	2–1	Wellington Phoenix	Sydney
Saturday 17:30	Garcia 35'; Bojić (yellow card) 6' (yellow-red card) 73'; Despotović 90+4'	Report	Cunningham 90+1'	Stadium: Allianz Stadium; Attendance: 14,503; Referee: Jarred Gillett

30 November 2013 8	Sydney FC	2–0	Newcastle Jets	Sydney
Saturday 19:30	Chianese 45+1'; Despotović 60'	Report		Stadium: Allianz Stadium; Attendance: 14,803; Referee: Ben Williams

7 December 2013 9	Central Coast Mariners	1–0	Sydney FC	Gosford
Saturday 19:30	McBreen 26'	Report		Stadium: Bluetongue Stadium; Attendance: 10,251; Referee: Peter Green

15 December 2013 10	Sydney FC	2–1	Melbourne Heart	Sydney
Sunday 17:00	Del Piero 43'; Despotović 45+1'	Report	Mifsud 72'	Stadium: Allianz Stadium; Attendance: 16,008; Referee: Chris Beath

22 December 2013 11	Wellington Phoenix	1–0	Sydney FC	Wellington
Sunday 17:00	Huysegems 33'	Report		Stadium: Westpac Stadium; Attendance: 6,339; Referee: Peter O'Leary

26 December 2013 12	Sydney FC	2–5	Brisbane Roar	Sydney
Thursday 19:30	Del Piero 11'; Garcia 90+4'	Report	Broich 20'; Petratos 23' (pen.), 35', 78' (pen.); Franjić 90+3'	Stadium: Allianz Stadium; Attendance: 17,662; Referee: Ben Williams

3 January 2014 13	Adelaide United	2–2	Sydney FC	Adelaide
Friday 19:30	F. Ferreira 24'; Barker-Daish 72' (pen.)	Report	Despotović 9'; Carle (yellow card) 45' (red card) 68'; Gameiro 82'	Stadium: Coopers Stadium; Attendance: 15,437; Referee: Strebre Delovski

11 January 2014 14	Western Sydney Wanderers	1–0	Sydney FC	Sydney
Saturday 19:30	Šantalab 87'	Report		Stadium: Pirtek Stadium; Attendance: 18,080; Referee: Jarred Gillett

18 January 2014 15	Sydney FC	0–1	Central Coast Mariners	Sydney
Saturday 19:30		Report	Sterjovski 58'	Stadium: Allianz Stadium; Attendance: 16,006; Referee: Peter O'Leary

26 January 2014 16	Melbourne Victory	0–5	Sydney FC	Melbourne
Sunday 17:00		Report	Despotović 11'; Del Piero 20' (pen.), 54'; Ryall 25'; Carle 87'	Stadium: Etihad Stadium; Attendance: 24,354; Referee: Ben Williams

31 January 2014 17	Melbourne Heart	2–1	Sydney FC	Melbourne
Friday 19:30	Engelaar (red card) 33'; Germano 52'; Williams 89'	Report	Gameiro 39'	Stadium: AAMI Park; Attendance: 7,674; Referee: Jarred Gillett

8 February 2014 18	Sydney FC	0–3	Adelaide United	Sydney
Saturday 19:30		Report	Djite 16'; F. Ferreira 27'; Jerónimo 80'	Stadium: Allianz Stadium; Attendance: 13,335; Referee: Alan Milliner

15 February 2014 19	Sydney FC	2–1	Perth Glory	Sydney
Saturday 17:30	Despotović 17'; Antonis 64'; Calver (yellow card) 50' (red card) 89'	Report	Ro. Griffiths 67'	Stadium: Allianz Stadium; Attendance: 11,160; Referee: Chris Beath

22 February 2014 20	Newcastle Jets	0–2	Sydney FC	Newcastle
Saturday 17:30		Report	Ognenovski 60'; Del Piero 73' (pen.)	Stadium: Hunter Stadium; Attendance: 12,449; Referee: Strebre Delovski

1 March 2014 21	Central Coast Mariners	2–1	Sydney FC	Gosford
Saturday 17:30	Kim 26'; Duke 75'	Report	Garcia 62'	Stadium: Central Coast Stadium; Attendance: 6,430; Referee: Jarred Gillett

8 March 2014 22	Sydney FC	3–1	Western Sydney Wanderers	Sydney
Saturday 19:30	Jurman 59'; Garcia 75'; Abbas 90+3' (pen.)	Report	Ono 49'	Stadium: Allianz Stadium; Attendance: 40,285; Referee: Kris Griffiths-Jones

14 March 2014 23	Sydney FC	1–1	Brisbane Roar	Sydney
Friday 19:30	Ryall 35'	Report	Berisha 23' (red card) 40'	Stadium: Allianz Stadium; Attendance: 13,073; Referee: Peter O'Leary

21 March 2014 24	Adelaide United	3–1	Sydney FC	Adelaide
Friday 19:30	Ferreira 13'; Cirio 54'; Djite 88'	Report	M. Thompson 74'	Stadium: Coopers Stadium; Attendance: 14,212; Referee: Kris Griffiths-Jones

29 March 2014 25	Melbourne Victory	1–1	Sydney FC	Melbourne
Saturday 19:30	Troisi 63'	Report	Chianese 48'	Stadium: AAMI Park; Attendance: 20,447; Referee: Jarred Gillett

6 April 2014 26	Sydney FC	4–1	Wellington Phoenix	Sydney
Sunday 17:00	Del Piero 33' (pen.), 45'; Ryall 57'; Abbas 60'	Report	Hernández 56' (pen.)	Stadium: Allianz Stadium; Attendance: 10,148; Referee: Kris Griffiths-Jones

13 April 2014 27	Sydney FC	2–1	Perth Glory	Sydney
Sunday 17:00	Antonis 38'; Garcia 90+3'	Report	Ro. Griffiths 45+1'	Stadium: Allianz Stadium; Attendance: 15,285; Referee: Lucien Laverdure

==== Finals Series ====
18 April 2014 Elimination-finals	Melbourne Victory	2–1	Sydney FC	Melbourne
Friday 19:30 AEST	A. Thompson 19'; Finkler 90+2'	Report	Ryall 34'	Stadium: Etihad Stadium; Attendance: 20,802; Referee: Peter Green

==== League Goalscorers per Round ====
Total	Player		Goals per Round																										
Total	Player		1	2	3	4	5	6	7	8	9	10	11	12	13	14	15	16	17	18	19	20	21	22	23	24	25	26	27
10	(Italy)	Alessandro Del Piero	1				1	1				1		1				2				1						2	
6	(Serbia)	Ranko Despotović							1	1		1			1			1			1								
6	(Australia)	Richard Garcia					1		1					1									1	1					1
4	(Australia)	Joel Chianese	1					1		1																	1		
4	(Australia)	Sebastian Ryall					1											1							1			1	
2	(Australia)	Corey Gameiro													1				1										
2	(Iraq)	Ali Abbas																						1				1	
2	(Australia)	Terry Antonis																			1								1
1	(Australia)	Nick Carle																1											
1	(Australia)	Saša Ognenovski																				1							
1	(Australia)	Matthew Jurman																						1					
1	(Australia)	Matt Thompson																								1			
40	TOTAL		2	0	0	0	3	2	2	2	0	2	0	2	2	0	0	5	1	0	2	2	1	3	1	1	1	4	2

== Awards ==
- Player of the Week (Round 1) – Alessandro Del Piero
- Player of the Week (Round 22) – Vedran Janjetović

== End-of-season awards ==
On 22 April 2014, Sydney FC hosted their annual Sky Blue Ball and presented seven awards on the night.

Award	Men's	Women's	Youth
Player of the Year	Nikola Petkovic	N/A	
Player's Player of the Year	Ali Abbas	Nicola Bolger	Chris Naumoff
Member's Player of the Year	Ali Abbas	N/A	
Golden Boot	Alessandro Del Piero	N/A	
Chairman's Award	Steve Corica (Youth team coach)		
