= 2012–13 Sydney FC season =

Sydney FC
2012–2013 season
- Chairman: Scott Barlow
- Manager: Ian Crook (until 11 November 2012); Steve Corica (Caretaker 12–27 November 2012); Frank Farina (from 28 November 2012)
- A-League: 7th
- Top goalscorer: Alessandro Del Piero (14)
Home colours	Away colours	Third colours

The 2012–13 season is Sydney FC's eighth consecutive season in the A-League since its foundation season in 2005–2006. Sydney started the season under the management of Ian Crook until his departure on 11 November 2012, being replaced by assistant coach Steve Corica who took up a caretaker role from 12 to 27 November. On 28 November Frank Farina was appointed as manager and Steve Corica returned to assistant coach.

== Players ==
=== Senior squad ===
Note: Flags indicate national team as defined under FIFA eligibility rules; some limited exceptions apply. Players may hold more than one non-FIFA nationality.

No.	Pos.	Nation	Player
1	GK	AUS	Ivan Necevski
2	DF	AUS	Sebastian Ryall
3	DF	BRA	Fabinho
4	DF	NED	Pascal Bosschaart
5	DF	AUS	Nathan Sherlock
7	MF	AUS	Brett Emerton (Vice-Captain)
8	DF	AUS	Adam Griffiths
9	MF	AUS	Paul Reid
10	FW	ITA	Alessandro Del Piero
11	FW	AUS	Jarrod Kyle
12	FW	AUS	Blake Powell
13	DF	BRA	Tiago
14	FW	AUS	Mitchell Mallia (Youth)

No.	Pos.	Nation	Player
15	MF	NIR	Terry McFlynn (Captain)
16	MF	AUS	Joel Chianese
17	MF	AUS	Terry Antonis (Youth)
18	DF	AUS	Trent McClenahan
19	FW	CRO	Krunoslav Lovrek
20	GK	AUS	Vedran Janjetović
21	MF	PAN	Yairo Yau (on loan from Sporting San Miguelito)
22	MF	IRQ	Ali Abbas
23	MF	AUS	Rhyan Grant
24	MF	AUS	Hagi Gligor (Youth)
25	DF	AUS	Daniel Petkovski (Youth)
29	FW	AUS	Joel Griffiths
32	DF	AUS	Lucas Neill

=== Out on loan ===
Note: Flags indicate national team as defined under FIFA eligibility rules; some limited exceptions apply. Players may hold more than one non-FIFA nationality.

No.	Pos.	Nation	Player
13	MF	AUS	Nick Carle (on loan to (United Arab Emirates) Baniyas SC until 30 June 2013)

=== Youth squad ===
Note: Flags indicate national team as defined under FIFA eligibility rules; some limited exceptions apply. Players may hold more than one non-FIFA nationality.

No.	Pos.	Nation	Player
24	MF	AUS	Hagi Gligor
25	DF	AUS	Daniel Petkovski
26	MF	AUS	Peter Triantis
27	FW	AUS	Alec Urosevski
28	DF	AUS	Aaron Calver
30	GK	AUS	Anthony Bouzanis
—	GK	AUS	Ryan Norval
—	DF	AUS	Keifer Dotti

No.	Pos.	Nation	Player
—	DF	AUS	Roberto Speranza
—	DF	AUS	Luke Jenner
—	DF	AUS	Luke Clifford
—	MF	AUS	Lukas Stergiou
—	MF	AUS	Christopher Naumoff
—	FW	AUS	Nikola Taneski
—	FW	AUS	Josh MacDonald
—	FW	AUS	Tom Slater

=== Transfers ===
==== Summer ====
In: Note: Flags indicate national team as defined under FIFA eligibility rules; some limited exceptions apply. Players may hold more than one non-FIFA nationality.

No.	Pos.	Nation	Player
3	DF	BRA	Fábio Alves (from (Australia) Melbourne Victory)
6	MF	AUS	Jason Čulina (from (Australia) Newcastle Jets)
8	DF	AUS	Adam Griffiths (from (China) Hangzhou Greentown)
9	MF	AUS	Paul Reid (from (Thailand) Police United)
10	FW	ITA	Alessandro Del Piero (from (Italy) Juventus)
12	FW	AUS	Blake Powell (promoted from (Australia) Sydney FC Youth)
14	FW	AUS	Mitchell Mallia (promoted from (Australia) Sydney FC Youth)
18	DF	AUS	Trent McClenahan (from (Australia) Central Coast Mariners)
19	FW	CRO	Krunoslav Lovrek (from (China) Qingdao Jonoon)
20	GK	AUS	Vedran Janjetović (from (Australia) Sydney United)
21	MF	PAN	Yairo Yau (from (Panama) Sporting San Miguelito)
22	MF	IRQ	Ali Abbas (from (Australia) Newcastle Jets FC)
24	MF	AUS	Hagi Gligor (promoted from (Australia) Sydney FC Youth)
25	DF	AUS	Daniel Petkovski (promoted from (Australia) Sydney FC Youth)

Out: Note: Flags indicate national team as defined under FIFA eligibility rules; some limited exceptions apply. Players may hold more than one non-FIFA nationality.

No.	Pos.	Nation	Player
1	GK	AUS	Liam Reddy (to (Iran) Esteghlal)
3	DF	AUS	Jamie Coyne (to (Indonesia) Sriwijaya)
5	DF	AUS	Michael Beauchamp (to (Australia) Western Sydney Wanderers)
6	MF	JPN	Hirofumi Moriyasu (to (Japan) Gifu)
8	MF	SVK	Karol Kisel (to (Czech Republic) Slavia Prague)
9	FW	BRA	Bruno Cazarine (to Free agent)
11	FW	AUS	Dimitri Petratos (to (Malaysia) Kelantan FA)
12	MF	AUS	Shannon Cole (to (Australia) Western Sydney Wanderers)
13	MF	AUS	Nick Carle (on loan to (United Arab Emirates) Baniyas until 30 June 2013)
18	FW	FIN	Juho Mäkelä (to (Finland) HJK)
19	FW	AUS	Mark Bridge (to (Australia) Western Sydney Wanderers)
21	MF	AUS	Scott Jamieson (to (Australia) Perth Glory)

==== Winter ====
In: Note: Flags indicate national team as defined under FIFA eligibility rules; some limited exceptions apply. Players may hold more than one non-FIFA nationality.

No.	Pos.	Nation	Player
11	FW	AUS	Joel Griffiths (from (China) Shanghai Shenhua)
11	FW	AUS	Jarrod Kyle
13	DF	BRA	Tiago (from (Australia) Newcastle Jets)
32	DF	AUS	Lucas Neill (from (United Arab Emirates) Al Wasl)
33	GK	AUS	Matthew Nash (from (Australia) Newcastle Jets Injury Cover)

Out: Note: Flags indicate national team as defined under FIFA eligibility rules; some limited exceptions apply. Players may hold more than one non-FIFA nationality.

No.	Pos.	Nation	Player
6	MF	AUS	Jason Čulina (Released)
33	GK	AUS	Matthew Nash (Released, end of injury cover)

== Competitions ==
=== Overall ===
Competition	Started round	Current position / round	Final position / round	First match	Last match
A-League	—	—	7th	6 October 2012	28 March 2013
National Youth League	—	—	9th	28 October 2012	23 February 2013
W-League	—	—	4th	20 October 2012	12 January 2013
W-League final series	Semi-finals	Grand final	Champions	19 January 2013	27 January 2013

=== A-League ===
==== Preseason ====
14 August 2012	Macarthur Rams (Australia)	1–3	(Australia) Sydney FC	Campbelltown
Tuesday 19:30 AEST	Elali 64'	Report	Abbas 20'; Taneski 28'; Petratos 38'	Stadium: Campbelltown Stadium; Attendance: 2,800; Referee: Strebre Delovski

21 August 2012	St George Saints (Australia)	0–5	(Australia) Sydney FC	Kogarah
Tuesday 19:30 AEST			Lovrek 19'; Chianese 30'; Yau 56'; Mallia 65'; Abbas 75'	Stadium: Jubilee Oval; Attendance: 2,100; Referee: Strebre Delovski

1 September 2012	Sydney FC (Australia)	2–4	(Australia) Adelaide United	Sydney
Saturday 17:00 AEST	Yau 12'; Mallia 88'		Djite 30'; Cássio 45'; Watson 83'; Kostopoulos 89'	Stadium: Marconi Stadium; Attendance: 2,500; Referee: Tim McGilchrist

9 September 2012	Sydney FC (Australia)	1–1	(Australia) Newcastle Jets	Sydney
Saturday 14:00 AEST	Mallia 61'		Zadkovich 30'	Stadium: Leichhardt Oval; Attendance: 2,000; Referee: Strebre Delovski

16 September 2012	Brisbane Roar (Australia)	5–1	(Australia) Sydney FC	Mackay
	Broich 25'; Grant 55' (o.g.); Paartalu 74'; Halloran 79'; Jurman 82'		Mallia 44'	Stadium: Virgin Australia Stadium; Attendance: 7,200

6 November 2012	Sydney FC (Australia)	1–0	(Australia) Western Sydney Wanderers	Macquarie Park
14:00 AEDT (UTC+11)	Petratos 33' (pen.)	Report		Stadium: Macquarie University

==== Matches ====
6 October 2012 1	Wellington Phoenix	2–0	Sydney FC	Wellington
16:30 AEST (UTC+10)	Huysegems 44'; Fenton 75'	Report		Stadium: Westpac Stadium; Attendance: 12,057; Referee: Peter Green

13 October 2012 2	Sydney FC	2–3	Newcastle Jets	Sydney
17:30 AEDT (UTC+11)	Del Piero 26'; Powell 73'	Report	Griffths 11'; Heskey 41'; Goodwin 62'	Stadium: Allianz Stadium; Attendance: 35,419; Referee: Chris Beath

20 October 2012 3	Western Sydney Wanderers	0–1	Sydney FC	Parramatta
19:45 AEDT (UTC+11)		Report	Del Piero 55'	Stadium: Parramatta Stadium; Attendance: 19,126; Referee: Strebre Delovski

28 October 2012 4	Sydney FC	2–1	Perth Glory	Sydney
18:00 AEDT (UTC+11)	Del Piero 59' (pen.); Emerton 72'	Summary	Dodd 18'; Pantelidis (red card) 57'	Stadium: ANZ Stadium; Attendance: 22,034; Referee: Peter Green

3 November 2012 5	Central Coast Mariners	7–2	Sydney FC	Gosford
19:30 AEDT (UTC+11)	Rogić 16', 62'; Ryall 29' (o.g.); McBreen 39' (pen.), 65', 67'; McGlinchey 56'	Summary	Yau 8'; Ali Abbas 54'	Stadium: Bluetongue Stadium; Attendance: 15,686; Referee: Strebre Delovski

10 November 2012 6	Sydney FC	2–3	Melbourne Victory	Sydney
19:45 AEDT (UTC+11)	Yau 14'; Bosschaart 48'	Summary	Nabbout 78', 90+1'; Thompson 86'	Stadium: Allianz Stadium; Attendance: 21,531; Referee: Kris Griffiths-Jones

16 November 2012 7	Brisbane Roar	4–2	Sydney FC	Brisbane
20:00 AEDT (UTC+11)	Broich 30'; Paartalu 33'; Halloran 45'; Berisha 56'	Summary	Del Piero 42', 49'	Stadium: Suncorp Stadium; Attendance: 22,970; Referee: Alan Milliner

23 November 2012 8	Sydney FC	1–2	Adelaide United	Sydney
19:30 AEDT (UTC+11)	Yau 56'	Summary	Vidošić 21'; Ferreira 88'	Stadium: Allianz Stadium; Attendance: 13,317; Referee: Peter Green

2 December 2012 9	Sydney FC	0–0	Melbourne Heart	Sydney
17:00 AEDT (UTC+11)		Summary		Stadium: Allianz Stadium; Attendance: 12,425; Referee: Strebre Delovski

9 December 2012 10	Wellington Phoenix	1–2	Sydney FC	Wellington
16:30 AEDT (UTC+11)	Brockie 90+2' (pen.)	Summary	Ryall 45+1'; Grant 70'; McFlynn (yellow card) 13' (yellow-red card) 85'	Stadium: Westpac Stadium; Attendance: 7,375; Referee: Kris Griffiths-Jones

15 December 2012 11	Sydney FC	0–2	Western Sydney Wanderers	Sydney
19:45 AEDT (UTC+11)		Summary	Hersi 24'; Beauchamp 77'	Stadium: Allianz Stadium; Attendance: 26,176; Referee: Chris Beath

22 December 2012 12	Newcastle Jets	2–1	Sydney FC	Newcastle
17:30 AEDT (UTC+11)	Goodwin 13'; Heskey 27'	Summary	Yau 32'	Stadium: Hunter Stadium; Attendance: 17,402; Referee: Strebre Delovski

27 December 2012 13	Sydney FC	1–0	Central Coast Mariners	Sydney
19:30 AEDT (UTC+11)	Emerton 89'	Summary	Hutchinson (yellow card) 85' (yellow-red card) 90+4'; Rogić (red card) 90+6'	Stadium: Allianz Stadium; Attendance: 16,887; Referee: Peter Green

31 December 2012 14	Adelaide United	3–0	Sydney FC	Adelaide
19:30 AEDT (UTC+11)	Vidošić 18', 29' (pen.); Ramsay 61'	Summary		Stadium: Hindmarsh Stadium; Attendance: 10,934; Referee: Jarred Gillett

5 January 2013 15	Perth Glory	2–2	Sydney FC	Perth
19:30 AEDT (UTC+11)	Smeltz 39', 80'	Summary	Culina 63'; Ryall 82'	Stadium: nib Stadium; Referee: Kris Griffiths-Jones

13 January 2013 16	Sydney FC	2–1	Melbourne Heart	Sydney
17:00 AEDT (UTC+11)	Emerton 85'; Grant 90+3'	Summary	Garcia 24'	Stadium: Allianz Stadium; Attendance: 13,125; Referee: Peter O'Leary

19 January 2013 17	Sydney FC	7–1	Wellington Phoenix	Sydney
17:30 AEDT (UTC+11)	Griffiths 11'; Del Piero 21', 23' (pen.), 39', 70'; Culina 27'; Yau 84'	Summary	Sigmund 80'	Stadium: Allianz Stadium; Attendance: 12,691; Referee: Kris Griffiths-Jones

26 January 2013 18	Melbourne Victory	3–1	Sydney FC	Melbourne
17:30 AEDT (UTC+11)	Rojas 23', 73'; Thompson 67'	Summary	Tiago (yellow card) 39' (yellow-red card) 60'; Griffiths 75'; Fabio (yellow card) 58' (yellow-red card) 90'	Stadium: AAMI Park; Referee: Chris Beath

2 February 2012 19	Newcastle Jets	2–2	Sydney FC	Newcastle
17:30 AEDT (UTC+11)	R.Griffiths 16' (pen.), 89' (pen.)	Summary	Del Piero 12'; Powell 57'; McFlynn (red card) 87'	Stadium: Hunter Stadium; Attendance: 12,428; Referee: Jarred Gillett

10 February 2013 20	Sydney FC	2–1	Brisbane Roar	Sydney
17:00 AEDT (UTC+11)	Del Piero 7'; Triantis 69'	Report; Summary	Berisha 45'	Stadium: Allianz Stadium; Attendance: 14,589; Referee: Ben Williams

16 February 2013 21	Sydney FC	2–1	Adelaide United	Sydney
19:30 AEDT (UTC+11)	Antonis 49'; Powell 67'	Report	Juric 78'	Stadium: Allianz Stadium; Attendance: 15,602; Referee: Strebre Delovski

24 February 2013 22	Melbourne Heart	3–1	Sydney FC	Melbourne
17:00 AEDT (UTC+11)	Kalmar 31'; Germano 36'; Williams 55' (pen.)	Summary	Ryall (red card) 54'; Griffiths 58'	Stadium: AAMI Park; Attendance: 13,752; Referee: Alan Milliner

2 March 2013 23	Perth Glory	2–1	Sydney FC	Perth
22:00 AEDT (UTC+11)	Harold 20'; Smeltz 35'	Summary	Del Piero 29'; Fabinho (yellow card) 14' (yellow-red card) 57'	Stadium: nib Stadium; Attendance: 8,378; Referee: Strebre Delovski

9 March 2013 24	Sydney FC	2–0	Central Coast Mariners	Sydney
19:30 AEDT (UTC+11)	Ryall 25'; Chianese 73'	Summary		Stadium: Allianz Stadium; Attendance: 16,155; Referee: Jarred Gillett

16 March 2013 25	Sydney FC	1–1	Melbourne Victory	Sydney
19:45 AEDT (UTC+11)	Yau 85'	Summary	Milligan 3'	Stadium: Allianz Stadium; Attendance: 22,233; Referee: Strebre Delovski

23 March 2013 26	Western Sydney Wanderers	1–1	Sydney FC	Parramatta
19:45 AEDT (UTC+11)	Cole 70'; La Rocca (red card) 90+5'	Summary	Del Piero 34'; Emerton (yellow card) 51' (yellow-red card) 56'	Stadium: Parramatta Stadium; Attendance: 19,585; Referee: Alan Milliner

28 March 2013 27	Brisbane Roar	3–1	Sydney FC	Brisbane
20:00 AEDT (UTC+11)	Berisha 30'; Lustica 51'; Franjic 79'	Summary	Del Piero 84' (pen.)	Stadium: Suncorp Stadium; Referee: Peter Green

==== Results by round ====
Round	1	2	3	4	5	6	7	8	9	10	11	12	13	14	15	16	17	18	19	20	21	22	23	24	25	26	27
Ground	A	H	A	H	A	H	A	H	H	A	H	A	H	A	A	H	H	A	A	H	H	A	A	H	H	A	A
Result	L	L	W	W	L	L	L	L	D	W	L	L	W	L	D	W	W	L	D	W	W	L	L	W	D	D	L
Position	9	9	8	5	7	8	10	10	10	10	10	10	9	10	10	9	7	8	8	6	5	7	8	5	5	6	7

Updated to match(es) played on 19 March 2013. Source: Matches
A = Away; H = Home; W = Win; D = Draw; L = Loss

==== Results summary ====
Overall								Home						Away					
Pld	W	D	L	GF	GA	GD	Pts	W	D	L	GF	GA	GD	W	D	L	GF	GA	GD
27	9	5	13	41	51	−10	32	7	2	4	24	16	+8	2	3	9	17	35	−18

==== League table ====
Pos	Team	Pld	W	D	L	GF	GA	GD	Pts	Qualification
1	Western Sydney Wanderers	27	18	3	6	41	21	+20	57	Qualification for 2014 AFC Champions League group stage and finals series
2	Central Coast Mariners (C)	27	16	6	5	48	22	+26	54	Qualification for 2014 AFC Champions League group stage and finals series
3	Melbourne Victory	27	13	5	9	48	45	+3	44	Qualification for 2014 AFC Champions League qualifying play-off and finals series (Note: Since the winner of 2013 A-League Grand Final (Central Coast Mariners) qualified for the 2014 AFC Champions League group stage, the 3rd placed team qualified for the qualifying play-off of 2014 AFC Champions League.)
4	Adelaide United	27	12	5	10	38	37	+1	41	Qualification for Finals series
5	Brisbane Roar	27	10	5	12	33	29	+4	35	Qualification for Finals series
6	Perth Glory	27	9	5	13	29	31	−2	32	Qualification for Finals series
7	Sydney FC	27	9	5	13	41	51	−10	32	
8	Newcastle Jets	27	8	7	12	30	45	−15	31	
9	Melbourne Heart	27	8	3	16	31	40	−9	27	
10	Wellington Phoenix (Note: Wellington Phoenix cannot qualify for the AFC Champions League as they are not recognised as an AFC club.)	27	7	6	14	31	49	−18	27	

Updated to match(es) played on 30 March 2013. Source: ultimatealeague.com
Rules for classification: 1) points; 2) goal difference; 3) number of goals scored.
(C) Champions

=== W-League ===
==== Regular season ====
21 October 2012 1	Sydney FC	3–3	Newcastle Jets	Sydney
15:00	Kennedy 35'; Kerr 75', 77'	Report	van Egmond 17'; Andrews 21'; Huster 58'	Stadium: Leichhardt Oval; Referee: Casey Reibelt

27 October 2012 2	Sydney FC	1–0	Western Sydney Wanderers	Sydney
14:00	Kete 29'	Report		Stadium: Leichhardt Oval; Referee: Peta McCallum

3 November 2012 3	Brisbane Roar	1–3	Sydney FC	Brisbane
15:00	Harch 44'	Report	Kerr 47'; Kete 58'; Perry 62'	Stadium: Cleveland Showgrounds; Referee: Kate Jacewicz

11 November 2012 4	Sydney FC	1–2	Melbourne Victory	Sydney
16:45	Kennedy 41'	Report	Jackson 8'; Špiranović 81'	Stadium: Leichhardt Oval; Referee: Kirralee Gardner

17 November 2012 5	Perth Glory	3–1	Sydney FC	Perth
11:00	R. Sutton 18', 76', 85'	Report	Logarzo 19'	Stadium: nib Stadium; Referee: Rebecca Durcau

24 November 2012 6	Adelaide United	0–4	Sydney FC	Adelaide
14:00		Report	Rollason 4'; Kete 11'; Logarzo 58', 77'	Stadium: Burton Park; Referee: Renee Silvester

1 December 2012 7	Sydney FC	4–3	Canberra United	Sydney
10:00	K. Simon 5', 76' (pen.); Kerr 18'; Kete 90+4'	Report	Yeoman-Dale 33'; Raso 58'; Washington 83'	Stadium: Leichhardt Oval; Referee: Kate Jacewicz

8 December 2012 8	Melbourne Victory	1–1	Sydney FC	Melbourne
16:00	Ruyter-Hooley 27'	Report	Foord 4'	Stadium: Wembley Stadium; Referee: Peta McCallum

15 December 2012 9	Sydney FC	5–7	Perth Glory	Sydney
17:00	K. Simon 41'; Kete 43'; Billson 62'; Foord 81'; Kerr 90+2'	Report	De Vanna 13', 72', 87'; Luik 56'; D'Ovidio 60', 61'; Gill 87'	Stadium: Allianz Stadium; Referee: Kirralee Gardner

23 December 2012 10	Newcastle Jets	0–4	Sydney FC	Newcastle
16:30		Report	K. Simon 11', 47', 87'; Kennedy 14'	Stadium: Wanderers Oval; Referee: Kelly Jones

5 January 2013 11	Sydney FC	0–2	Brisbane Roar	Sydney
15:00		Report	T. Butt 45+3', 55'	Stadium: Cromer Park; Referee: Katie Patterson

12 January 2013 12	Western Sydney Wanderers	2–3	Sydney FC	Sydney
10:00	Fors 30', 74' (pen.)	Report	Foord 3'; Kerr 39'; Bolger 83'	Stadium: Campbelltown Stadium; Referee: Kate Jacewicz

==== Finals Series ====
19 January 2013 Semi Final	Brisbane Roar	2–3	Sydney FC	Brisbane
15:00	Gielnik 14'; V. Popovic 75'	Report	Longo 19'; Kerr 29', 61'; Kete (red card) 78'	Stadium: QSAC; Attendance: 1,901; Referee: Kirralee Gardener

27 January 2013 Grand final	Melbourne Victory	1–3	Sydney FC	Melbourne
15:30	P. Larsson 41' (f.k.); Ruyter-Hooley (red card) 84'	Report	Bolger 25'; Kerr 48'; Simon 86' (pen.)	Stadium: AAMI Park; Attendance: 4,181; Referee: Kate Jacewicz

==== Results summary ====
Overall								Home						Away					
Pld	W	D	L	GF	GA	GD	Pts	W	D	L	GF	GA	GD	W	D	L	GF	GA	GD
12	6	2	4	30	24	+6	20	2	1	3	14	17	−3	4	1	1	16	7	+9

==== League table ====
Pos	Team	Pld	W	D	L	GF	GA	GD	Pts	Qualification
1	Brisbane Roar	12	8	2	2	28	15	+13	26	Qualification to Finals series
2	Perth Glory	12	7	3	2	34	20	+14	24	Qualification to Finals series
3	Melbourne Victory	12	7	2	3	26	14	+12	23	Qualification to Finals series
4	Sydney FC (C)	12	6	2	4	30	24	+6	20	Qualification to Finals series
5	Canberra United	12	5	3	4	25	20	+5	18	
6	Western Sydney Wanderers	12	4	1	7	19	23	−4	13	
7	Newcastle Jets	12	1	3	8	15	33	−18	6	
8	Adelaide United	12	2	0	10	12	40	−28	6	

Source: au.soccerway.com
Rules for classification: 1) points; 2) goal difference; 3) number of goals scored.
(C) Champions

==== League goalscorers by round ====
Total	Player		Goals per Game													
Total	Player		1	2	3	4	5	6	7	8	9	10	11	12	SF	GF
9	(Australia)	Sam Kerr	2		1				1		1			1	2	1
7	(Australia)	Kyah Simon							2		1	3				1
5	(New Zealand)	Emma Kete		1	1			1	1		1					
3	(Australia)	Chloe Logarzo					1	2								
3	(Australia)	Alanna Kennedy	1			1						1				
3	(Australia)	Caitlin Foord								1	1			1		
2	(Australia)	Nicola Bolger												1		1
1	(Australia)	Ellyse Perry			1											
1	(Australia)	Renee Rollason						1								
1	(Australia)	Lillie Billson									1					
1	(New Zealand)	Annalie Longo													1	

== Squad statistics ==
As of 28 March 2012

=== Appearances and goals ===
No.	Pos	Nat	Player	Total		A League	
No.	Pos	Nat	Player	Apps	Goals	Apps	Goals
1	GK	(Australia) AUS	Ivan Necevski	11	0	11+0	0
2	DF	(Australia) AUS	Sebastian Ryall	25	3	23+2	3
3	DF	(Brazil) BRA	Fabinho	18	0	17+1	0
4	DF	(Netherlands) NED	Pascal Bosschaart	6	1	6+0	1
5	DF	(Australia) AUS	Nathan Sherlock	3	0	2+1	0
7	MF	(Australia) AUS	Brett Emerton	22	3	22+0	3
8	DF	(Australia) AUS	Adam Griffiths	18	0	16+2	0
9	MF	(Australia) AUS	Paul Reid	11	0	6+5	0
10	FW	(Italy) ITA	Alessandro Del Piero	24	14	23+1	14
12	FW	(Australia) AUS	Blake Powell	18	3	9+9	3
13	DF	(Brazil) BRA	Tiago	9	0	9+0	0
14	FW	(Australia) AUS	Mitchell Mallia	7	0	5+2	0
15	MF	(Northern Ireland) NIR	Terry McFlynn	19	0	15+4	0
16	MF	(Australia) AUS	Joel Chianese	13	1	2+11	1
17	MF	(Australia) AUS	Terry Antonis	17	1	13+4	1
18	DF	(Australia) AUS	Trent McClenahan	12	0	9+3	0
19	FW	(Croatia) CRO	Krunoslav Lovrek	5	0	5+0	0
20	GK	(Australia) AUS	Vedran Janjetović	16	0	16+0	0
21	MF	(Panama) PAN	Yairo Yau	18	6	11+7	6
22	MF	(Iraq) IRQ	Ali Abbas	24	1	21+3	1
23	MF	(Australia) AUS	Rhyan Grant	25	2	24+1	2
24	MF	(Australia) AUS	Hagi Gligor	4	0	1+3	0
25	DF	(Australia) AUS	Daniel Petkovski	3	0	2+1	0
26	MF	(Australia) AUS	Peter Triantis	14	1	13+1	1
27	FW	(Australia) AUS	Alec Urosevski	2	0	0+2	0
28	DF	(Australia) AUS	Aaron Calver	3	0	1+2	0
29	FW	(Australia) AUS	Joel Griffiths	8	3	8+0	3
32	DF	(Australia) AUS	Lucas Neill	3	0	3+0	0
Players away from the club on loan:
13	MF	(Australia) AUS	Nick Carle	0	0	0+0	0
Players who appeared for Sydney FC no longer at the club:
11	FW	(Australia) AUS	Dimitri Petratos	1	0	1+0	0
6	MF	(Australia) AUS	Jason Culina	8	2	6+2	2

=== Disciplinary record ===
No.	Position	Name	Yellow card	Yellow card Yellow card Red card	Red card
1	GK	(Australia) Ivan Necevski	1	0	0
2	DF	(Australia) Sebastian Ryall	7	0	0
3	DF	(Brazil) Fabinho	6	2	0
4	DF	(Netherlands) Pascal Bosschaart	1	0	0
5	DF	(Australia) Nathan Sherlock	1	0	0
6	MF	(Australia) Jason Culina	1	0	0
7	MF	(Australia) Brett Emerton	8	1	0
8	DF	(Australia) Adam Griffiths	6	0	0
9	MF	(Australia) Paul Reid	2	0	0
10	FW	(Italy) Alessandro Del Piero	3	0	0
11	FW	(Australia) Dimitri Petratos	1	0	0
12	FW	(Australia) Blake Powell	2	0	0
13	DF	(Brazil) Tiago	5	1	0
15	MF	(Northern Ireland) Terry McFlynn	6	1	1
16	MF	(Australia) Joel Chianese	2	0	0
17	MF	(Australia) Terry Antonis	3	0	0
18	DF	(Australia) Trent McClenahan	2	0	0
19	FW	(Croatia) Krunoslav Lovrek	1	0	0
20	GK	(Australia) Vedran Janjetović	1	0	0
21	MF	(Panama) Yairo Yau	3	0	0
22	MF	(Iraq) Ali Abbas	9	0	0
23	MF	(Australia) Rhyan Grant	5	0	0
26	MF	(Australia) Peter Triantis	4	0	0
27	FW	(Australia) Alec Urosevski	1	0	0
28	DF	(Australia) Aaron Calver	1	0	0
29	FW	(Australia) Joel Griffiths	2	0	0

== End-of-season awards ==
On 10 April 2013, Sydney FC hosted their annual Sky Blue Ball and presented seven awards on the night.

Award	Men's	Women's	Youth
Player of the Year	Alessandro Del Piero	N/A	
Player's Player of the Year	Rhyan Grant	Teresa Polias	Peter Triantis
Member's Player of the Year	Alessandro Del Piero	N/A	
Golden Boot	Alessandro Del Piero	N/A	
Chairman's Award	Alen Stajcic W-League coach		
