= Christopher Gligor =

Australian soccer player

Hagi Gligor
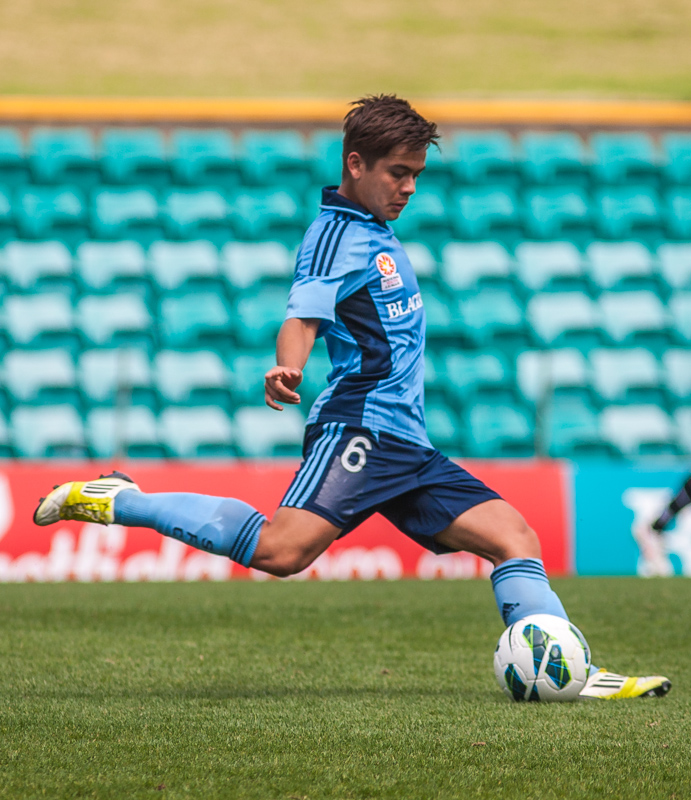
- Gligor in 2012

Personal information
- Full name: Christopher Josif Hagi Gligor
- Date of birth: 8 April 1995 (age 31)
- Place of birth: Sydney, Australia
- Height: 1.72 m (5 ft 8 in)
- Position: Central midfielder

Youth career
- 2011–2012: Sydney FC

Senior career*
Years	Team	Apps	(Gls)
2012–2015	Sydney FC	18	(0)
2015–2016	Perth Glory	12	(1)
2016	Perth Glory NPL	3	(0)
2016–2023	Sydney Olympic	82	(5)

International career^{‡}
2012–2014	Australia U20	13	(0)
2014	Australia U23	2	(3)
- * Club domestic league appearances and goals as of 13 December 2023 ‡ National team caps and goals as of 16 October 2014

Christopher Josif Hagi Gligor (born 8 April 1995) is an Australian former soccer player who last played as a central midfielder for Sydney Olympic.

== Early life ==
He is the son of former Romanian footballer, Tiberiu Gligor, who emigrated to Australia in the early 1990s. Gligor is also half-Filipino on his mother's side. He is named after the great former Romanian international Gheorghe Hagi.

== Club career ==
=== Sydney FC ===
As an integral part of Sydney FC's youth team, Gligor featured prominently for two seasons which prompted the club to sign him to his first senior deal at the end of the 2011–12 A-League season. The promising young midfielder signed a two-year deal with Sydney FC along with fellow youth players Mitchell Mallia and Daniel Petkovski. In May 2012, Gligor also won player of the month and received a nomination for National Youth League Player of the Year.

After many standout performances in the National Youth League, he made his first senior league appearance at just 17 years of age as a substitute on 3 November 2012 away to Central Coast Mariners.

On 3 June 2015, Hagi, along with several other players were released from Sydney FC.

=== Perth Glory ===
On 13 July 2015, Gligor joined Perth Glory, and made his debut in the A-League against Central Coast Mariners. On 2 January 2016, he scored his first goal in a 2–1 defeat against Brisbane Roar. In May 2016, it was announced that his team would not renew his contract at the end of the season.

=== Sydney Olympic ===
On 18 August 2023, he announced his retirement at the end of the season.

== International career ==
Gligor was a member of Australia's squad at the 2013 FIFA U-20 World Cup, but did not appear in a match. He was named in the Australia squad for the 2014 AFC U-19 Championship held in Myanmar, where he featured in all 3 group games.

== Career statistics ==
As of match played 15 July 2014

Club	Season	League			Cup		Continental		Total	
Club	Season	Division	Apps	Goals	Apps	Goals	Apps	Goals	Apps	Goals
Sydney FC	2012–13	A-League	4	0	0	0	0	0	4	0
Sydney FC	2013–14	A-League	11	0	0	0	0	0	11	0
Sydney FC	2014–15	A-League	3	0	2	0	0	0	5	0
Sydney FC	Sydney FC total		18	0	2	0	0	0	20	0
Perth Glory	2015–16	A-League	8	1	3	0	0	0	11	1
Career total			26	1	5	0	0	0	31	1
