= Mitchell Mallia =

Australian soccer player

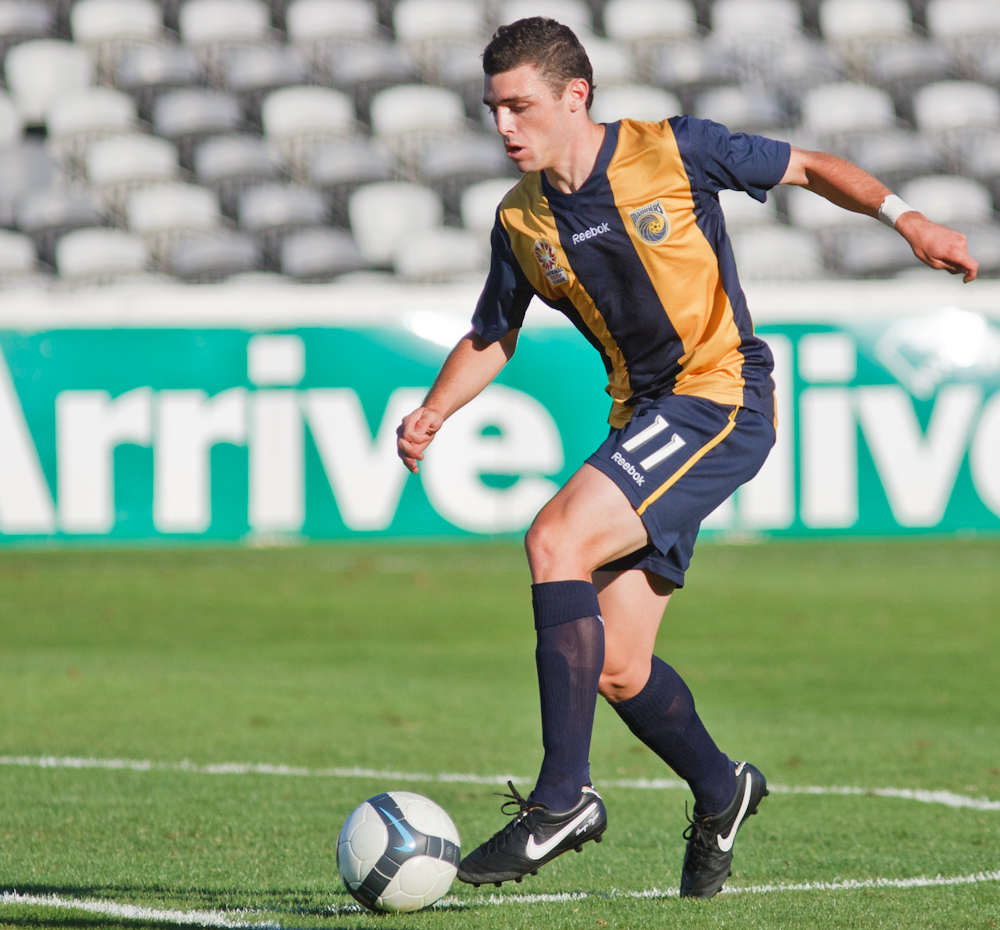
- Mallia playing for Central Coast Mariners Youth in 2010

Personal information
- Full name: Mitchell Daniel Mallia
- Date of birth: 22 March 1992 (age 34)
- Place of birth: Liverpool, Australia
- Height: 1.75 m (5 ft 9 in)
- Position: Striker

Team information
- Current team: Blacktown City

Youth career
- St. Pats
- AC United
- Southern Districts
- Macarthur Rams
- Marconi Stallions
- 2009–2011: Central Coast Mariners Academy

Senior career*
Years	Team	Apps	(Gls)
2010	Central Coast Mariners	1	(0)
2010–2011	Marconi Stallions	21	(2)
2011–2014	Sydney FC	18	(1)
2014–2018	Blacktown City	87	(33)
2017	→ Perth Glory (loan)	6	(1)
2019–2021	Marconi Stallions	45	(12)
2022–2023	Blacktown City	23	(6)
2024–	Blacktown City	27	(9)

International career^{‡}
2007	Australia U-17	5	(2)
2012	Australia U-23	1	(0)
- * Club domestic league appearances and goals as of 23 January 2025 ‡ National team caps and goals as of 14 June 2016

Mitchell Daniel Mallia (born 22 March 1992) is an Australian professional soccer player who plays for Blacktown City in the NPL NSW.

== Playing career ==
=== Club ===
==== Central Coast Mariners ====
On 31 January 2010 he made his first team debut for the Mariners in a 3–1 loss against Perth Glory, becoming the youngest player to represent the Mariners in the A-League.

==== Sydney FC ====
In 2011, after he was told he wasn't in the plans of Central Coast manager Graham Arnold, Mallia moved to Sydney FC to take up a contract in their National Youth League setup. After an impressive start to the youth season where he was the leading goalscorer, Sydney FC manager Vítězslav Lavička gave Mallia his first Sydney FC senior appearance on 17 December 2011 against Newcastle Jets where he would then go on to make 6 appearances in the 2011–12 A-League season. Mallia scored his first senior goal for Sydney FC on 19 February 2012 against Adelaide United in his team's 2–1 win at Hindmarsh Stadium. After impressing throughout the season, Mallia signed his first senior contract on 21 January 2012, sealing a two-year deal with Sydney FC along with fellow youngsters from the youth league team Daniel Petkovski and Hagi Gligor.

==== Blacktown City ====
In 2014, after the end of his contract with Sydney FC, Mallia signed with NPL NSW club Blacktown City.

Mallia scored a first half hat-trick on the opening match day of the 2015 National Premier Leagues NSW Men's 1 season against Sydney United in their 3–2 victory.

==== Perth Glory ====
Following Joel Chianese being sidelined with a collar bone injury, Perth Glory signed Mallia on an injury replacement contract on 11 October 2017. After Chianese's recovery from his injury, Mallia was released from the club.

==== Retirement ====
After spending nearly 5 years playing in the 2nd tier of Australian football, Mallia chose to retire before the start of the 2023 NPL NSW season due to continuous injuries.

==== Return to Blacktown City ====
On 12 December 2023, it was revealed that Mitch had come out of retirement to play for Blacktown City for the 2024 NPL NSW season.

=== International career ===
On 7 March 2011 he was selected to represent the Australia Olympic football team in an Asian Olympic Qualifier match against Iraq. He is also eligible to play for the Malta national football team.

In March 2018, Mallia was called up to the Maltese squad for two friendly matches, but never made an appearance.

== Career statistics ==
As of 2 November 2017

Club	Season	League			Cup		Continental		Total	
Club	Season	Division	Apps	Goals	Apps	Goals	Apps	Goals	Apps	Goals
Central Coast Mariners	2009–10	A-League	1	0	0	0	0	0	1	0
Central Coast Mariners	2010–11	A-League	0	0	0	0	0	0	0	0
Central Coast Mariners	Total		1	0	0	0	0	0	1	0
Marconi Stallions	2010	NSW Premier League	12	2	3	1	0	0	15	1
Marconi Stallions	2011	NSW Premier League	9	0	0	0	0	0	9	0
Marconi Stallions	Total		21	2	3	1	0	0	24	1
Sydney FC	2011–12	A-League	6	1	0	0	0	0	6	1
Sydney FC	2012–13	A-League	7	0	0	0	0	0	7	0
Sydney FC	2013–14	A-League	4	0	0	0	0	0	4	0
Sydney FC	Total		17	1	0	0	0	0	17	1
Blacktown City	2014	National Premier Leagues	15	8	3	1	0	0	18	9
Blacktown City	2015	National Premier Leagues	21	9	9	1	0	0	30	10
Blacktown City	2016	National Premier Leagues	24	6	3	2	0	0	27	8
Blacktown City	2017	National Premier Leagues	18	6	8	10	0	0	24	14
Blacktown City	Total		78	29	23	14	0	0	101	43
Perth Glory	2017–18	A-League	5	1	0	0	0	0	5	1
Career total			122	33	26	15	0	0	148	48

== Honours ==
=== Club ===
Marconi Stallions

- Waratah Cup: 2010

Blacktown City

- National Premier Leagues: 2015
- National Premier Leagues NSW Championship: 2014, 2016
- National Premier Leagues NSW Premiership: 2015
- Waratah Cup: 2014
