= Peter Triantis =

Australian soccer player

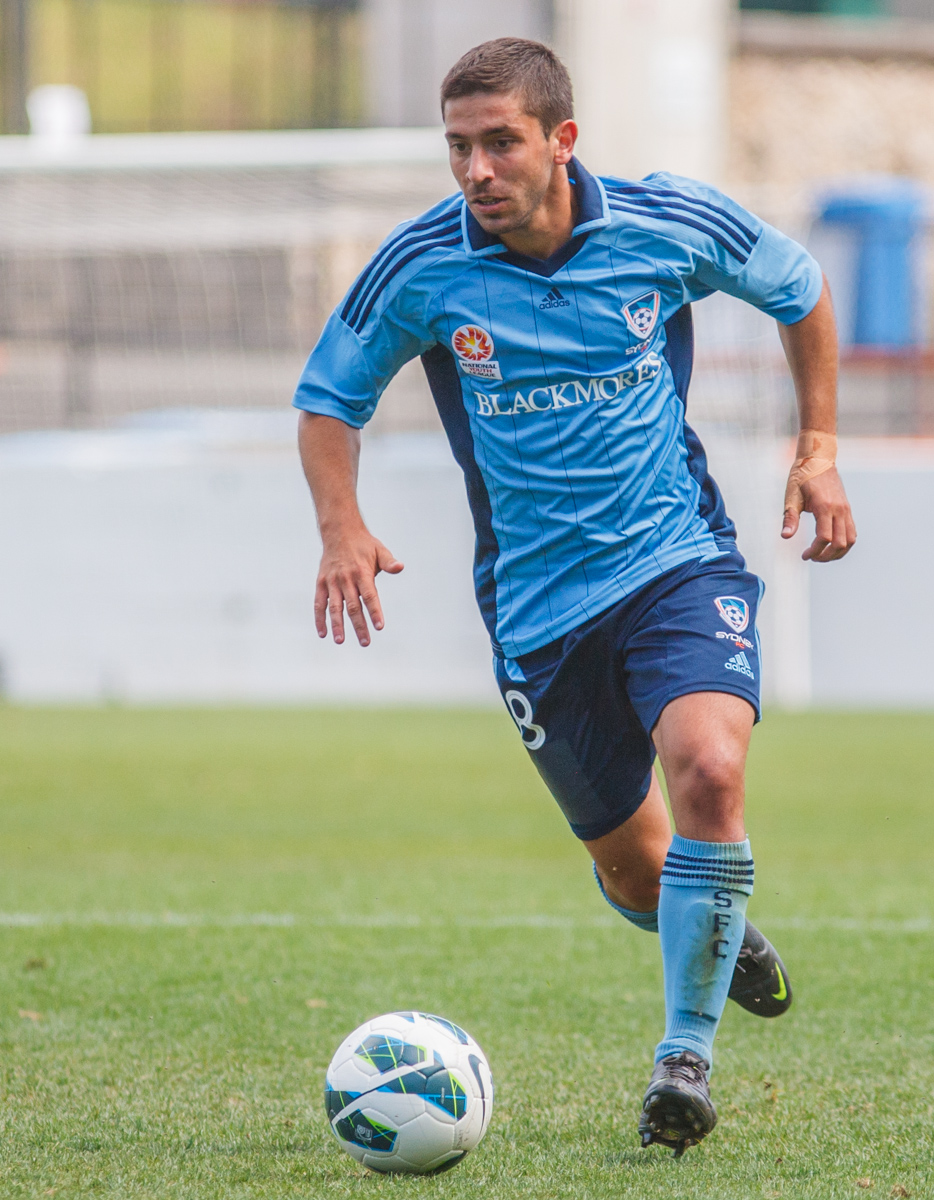
- Triantis playing for Sydney FC Youth in 2012

Personal information
- Full name: Peter Triantis
- Date of birth: 17 January 1992 (age 34)
- Place of birth: Sydney, New South Wales, Australia
- Height: 1.70 m (5 ft 7 in)
- Position: Central midfielder

Youth career
- 2009–2010: APIA Leichhardt Tigers
- 2012–2013: Sydney FC

Senior career*
Years	Team	Apps	(Gls)
2010–2012	Sydney Olympic	49	(0)
2012–2015	Sydney FC	23	(1)
2015–2016	Sydney United	29	(2)
2017–2018	Marconi Stallions	26	(0)
2019	Mounties Wanderers	24	(2)
2020–2023	Bankstown City	26	(2)
- * Club domestic league appearances and goals as of 10 November 2021

Peter Triantis (born 17 January 1992) is an Australian soccer player who last played as a central midfielder for Bankstown City.

== Club career ==
=== Youth career ===
Triantis' youth career began in 2009 at APIA Leichhardt Tigers before moving a year later to Sydney Olympic FC where he quickly forced his way into the First Grade squad. After amassing 49 games for Olympic and winning a title with them in the process, Peter was brought into the Sydney FC youth setup in 2012 under Brian Dene and impressed early in a pre-season youth tournament (2012 Vietnam Youth Cup) and then went on to play in the Sydney FC National Youth League squad.

=== Sydney FC ===
Triantis made his A-League debut for Sydney FC on 22 December 2012 against the Newcastle Jets, where he came on as a 30th-minute substitute for Brett Emerton. A week later, he made his first start for the team against the league-leading Central Coast Mariners where Sydney FC won 1–0. After being in and out of the team, Triantis received another start on 10 February 2013 where he scored his first goal for Sydney FC against Brisbane Roar. The goal gave Sydney FC a 2–1 lead and turned out to be the winning goal.

On 7 March 2013, Triantis signed a 2-year deal with Sydney FC and subsequently his first senior deal in professional football to take him through to the end of the 2014/15 A-League season with the club. At the start of the 2013/14 season, Triantis was ruled out for 4–5 months with osteitis pubis allowing Matt Thompson to sign as injury cover for the young midfielder.

Triantis was released from his contract at the conclusion of the 2014–15 season.

== Honours ==
With Sydney United:

- (Australia) Waratah Cup: 2016
- (Australia) National Premier Leagues NSW Premiership: 2016
- (Australia) National Premier Leagues Championship: 2016

With Marconi Stallions:

- (Australia) National Premier Leagues NSW 2 Premiership: 2017
- (Australia) National Premier Leagues NSW 2 Championship: 2017

== Career statistics ==
As of 13 October 2014

Club	Season	League			Cup			Asia			Total		
Club	Season	Apps	Goals	Assists	Apps	Goals	Assists	Apps	Goals	Assists	Apps	Goals	Assists
Sydney FC	2012–13	14	1	1	0	0	0	0	0	0	14	1	1
Sydney FC	2013–14	0	0	0	0	0	0	0	0	0	0	0	0
Sydney FC	2014–15	2	0	0	1	0	0	0	0	0	3	0	0
Sydney FC total		16	1	1	1	0	0	0	0	0	17	1	1
Career total		16	1	1	1	0	0	0	0	0	17	1	1

== Personal life ==
Peter is one of 10 children in his family. His older brother Chris Triantis is a former professional footballer, while his younger brother Nectarios Triantis currently plays as a defender for Minnesota United FC. Nectarios was a part of Central Coast Mariners' 2023 A-League Men Grand Final winning side. Attended Secondary School education at St Mary's Cathedral College, Sydney.
