= Daniel Petkovski =

Australian soccer player (born 1993)

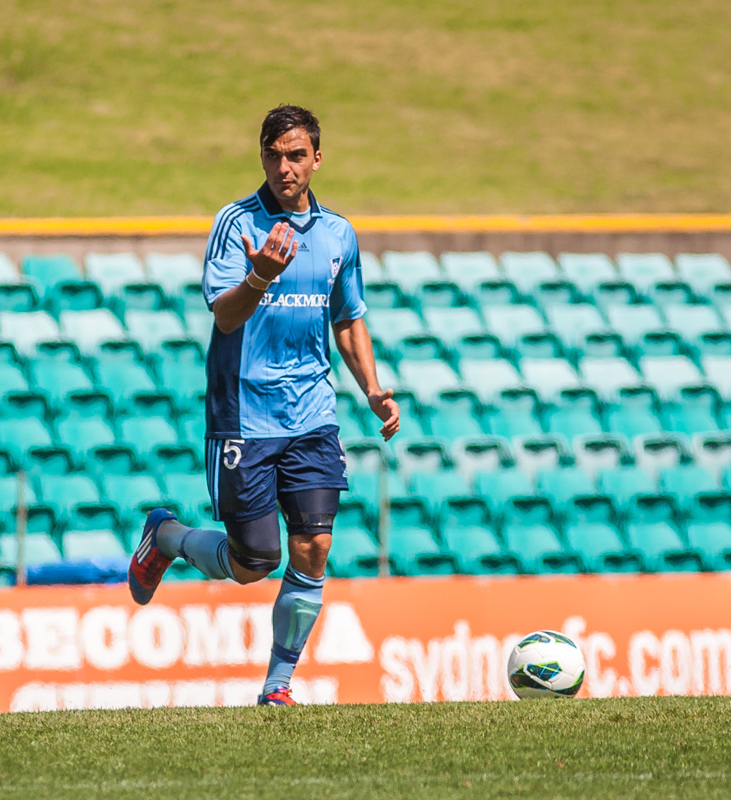
- Petkovski playing for Sydney FC Youth in 2012

Personal information
- Date of birth: 6 June 1993 (age 33)
- Place of birth: Sydney, Australia
- Height: 1.87 m (6 ft 2 in)
- Position: Left-back

Youth career
- 2009–2010: AIS
- 2010–2011: Marconi Stallions
- 2011–2012: Sydney FC

Senior career*
Years	Team	Apps	(Gls)
2012–2014	Sydney FC	7	(0)
2014	Sydney United 58		
2015	APIA Leichhardt	11	(0)
2015–2023	Rockdale Ilinden	139	(4)
2024	Hills United	27	(0)

International career^{‡}
2011–2012	Australia U20	10	(0)

Managerial career
- 2026–: Manly United (assistant)
- * Club domestic league appearances and goals as of 17 August 2024 ‡ National team caps and goals as of 11 May 2015

Daniel Petkovski (Macedonian: Даниел Петковски; born 6 June 1993) is a former Australian soccer player, who is currently Assistant Coach of Manly United. He is of Macedonian descent.

== Club career ==
=== Sydney FC ===
Petkovski joined Sydney FC's National Youth League team in 2011 after being signed from New South Wales Premier League club Marconi Stallions. At the end of the 2011–12 A-League season, the promising left-back was signed to a 2-year deal with Sydney FC along with fellow youth players Mitchell Mallia and Hagi Gligor.

Petkovski made his Sydney FC debut as a 75th-minute substitute for Fabio against cross-town rivals Western Sydney Wanderers FC in the first ever Sydney Derby which Sydney FC won 1–0, followed by two more appearances in his debut season against Central Coast Mariners and Perth Glory.

=== Sydney United 58 ===
After being released by Sydney FC, he signed with National Premier Leagues NSW club Sydney United 58 for the rest of the 2014 season.

=== APIA Leichhardt Tigers ===
After being released from Sydney United 58, he signed for National Premier Leagues NSW club APIA Leichhardt Tigers for the 2015 season.

=== Rockdale Ilinden FC ===
Petkovski was a part of Rockdale Ilinden's premiership winning side in 2020 after a thirty-six year wait, He scored important goals in the 2020 season.

==== 2015 season ====
In 2015, Petkovski signed for National Premier Leagues NSW club Rockdale Ilinden. Petkovski played in the FFA Cup Round of 32 match against Perth Glory then qualifying for the Round of 16 where Rockdale Ilinden was put up against A-League club Melbourne Victory.

==== 2018 season ====
Petkovski played in the FFA Cup match against Sydney FC (the then FFA Cup holders and Minor Premiers from the previous A-League season) in the Round of 32. They played at home at the Ilinden Sports Centre. The match was broadcast live on Foxtel and a crowd of 4,489 packed into the Ilinden Sports Centre. Sydney FC won 4–2 in the end.

==== 2020 season ====
All NPL and grassroots competitions were suspended for one month due to the impacts from the COVID-19 pandemic in Australia, effective 18 March to 14 April, and further extended until at least the end of May. The regular season re-commenced in a condensed format from 18 July, with promotion and relegation suspended. The competition resumed on 31 July with a single round-robin format (11 matches) followed by a two-week finals series. The NPL Premier normally qualifies for the national NPL finals series, but the 2020 National Premier Leagues finals series was cancelled in July. Rockdale Ilinden finished top of the table this season on 24 points which made them qualify for the finals series. Rockdale Ilinden had Sydney Olympic in the semi-final where Rockdale Ilinden managed to defeat Olympic 3–0. Rockdale Ilinden qualified for the 2020 National Premier Leagues final where they had to face Sydney United 58 FC. Petkovski scored a very important goal to equalise the match 3–3 before extra-time.

==== 2023 season ====
On the 18th of February news came out Rockdale Ilinden that club captain Daniel Petkovski departs the club via a mutual agreement between the club and player.

== Career statistics ==
As of 22 February 2014

Club	Division	Season	League		Finals		Continental		Total	
Club	Division	Season	Apps	Goals	Apps	Goals	Apps	Goals	Apps	Goals
Sydney FC	A-League	2012–13	3	0	0	0	0	0	3	0
Sydney FC	A-League	2013–14	3	0	0	0	0	0	3	0
Sydney FC	A-League	Total	6	0	0	0	0	0	6	0
Career total			6	0	0	0	0	0	6	0

== International career ==
Petkovski has represented Australia at Under 20 level where he took part in the AFC U-19 Championship qualification campaign. The Young Socceroos topped their qualifying group with maximum points and will take part in the 2012 AFC U-19 Championship to be played in the United Arab Emirates in November 2012. Australia are grouped with hosts UAE, current title holders North Korea and all time championship leaders South Korea. Petkovski has been selected in the 23-man training squad named by coach Paul Okon.
