= Yairo Yau =

Panamanian footballer (born 1989)

Personal information
- Full name: Yairo Armando Glaize Yau
- Date of birth: 7 September 1989 (age 37)
- Place of birth: Panama City, Panama
- Height: 1.72 m (5 ft 8 in)
- Positions: Winger; striker

Youth career
- Alianza

Senior career*
| Years | Team | Apps | (Gls) |
| 2009–2010 | Alianza | 28 | (4) |
| 2010–2015 | Sporting San Miguelito | 49 | (11) |
| 2011 | → Deportivo Cali (loan) | 6 | (1) |
| 2012–2014 | → Sydney FC (loan) | 27 | (6) |
| 2015 | Tepic | 8 | (0) |
| 2016–2018 | San Francisco | 43 | (11) |
| 2018 | Cartaginés | 9 | (1) |
| 2018–2019 | San Miguelito | 25 | (6) |
| 2019 | → Costa del Este (loan) | 10 | (2) |
| 2020 | Quiché FC | | |
| 2021 | San Miguelito | 15 | (3) |
| 2022 | Árabe Unido | 8 | (0) |

International career^{‡}
| 2010 | Panama U-21 | 1 | (0) |
| 2010–2012 | Panama U-23 | 5 | (1) |
| 2010–2016 | Panama | 12 | (1) |
- * Club domestic league appearances and goals as of 29 May 2018 ‡ National team caps and goals as of 3 October 2017

Yairo Armando Glaize Yau (born 7 September 1989) is a Panamanian footballer who currently plays as a winger for Quiché FC in Guatemala

== Career ==
=== Early career ===
In 2009, at the age of 19, Yau began his senior career at Panamanian club Alianza before moving to Sporting San Miguelito a year later where he made 17 appearances before being loaned out to Deportivo Cali in 2011 and Australian club Sydney FC in 2012. The move to Sydney FC is Yau's first move outside of Central or South America so far in his short career.

=== Club career ===
On July 11, 2012, it was announced that he had joined Sydney FC on a one year loan deal from Panamanian club Sporting San Miguelito with the option to make the move permanent throughout the season. After a solid first season which yielded 6 goals in 18 games, Sydney FC announced that they would be extending the loan for an additional year. On 7 January 2014, Sydney FC announced that they would be releasing Yau from the remaining months of his loan deal to allow him to undergo treatment for compartment syndrome in his legs.

He was released by Sporting in summer 2015 and Yau moved to Mexico to play for second division side Coras de Tepic.

In January 2020 Yau moved to Guatemala and joined Quiché FC.

== International career ==
Yau has represented Panama at U21, U23 and senior level in recent years. He made one appearance for the U21 team in the 2010 CAC Games and also made 5 appearances overall for Panama at U23 level, scoring 1 goal in their CONCACAF Under 23 Olympic Qualifying campaign.

On 8 September 2010 he made his senior international debut for Panama in a match against Trinidad and Tobago coming off the bench to replace Luis Rentería in the 67' minute of the game. In May 2012 he scored his first goal for Panama in a match against Guyana national football team.

=== International goals ===
==== Under-23 ====
| # | Date | Venue | Opponent | Score | Result | Competition |
|---|---|---|---|---|---|---|
| 1 | March 24, 2012 | Carson, California | Honduras | 1–3 | Loss | U-23 CONCACAF Olympic Qualifying (1 Goal) |

==== Full international ====
| # | Date | Venue | Opponent | Score | Result | Competition |
|---|---|---|---|---|---|---|
| 1 | May 20, 2012 | Panama City, Panama | Guyana | 2–0 | Win | Friendly (1 Goal) |

== Career statistics ==
As of 5 December 2012

| Club performance | | | League | | Cup | | Continental | | Total | |
| Season | Club | League | Apps | Goals | Apps | Goals | Apps | Goals | Apps | Goals |
| Panama | | | League | | Cup | | North America | | Total | |
|---|---|---|---|---|---|---|---|---|---|---|
| 2010–11 | Alianza | Liga Panameña de Fútbol | 28 | 4 | - | | 0 | 0 | 28 | 4 |
| 2010–11 | Sporting San Miguelito | Liga Panameña de Fútbol | 17 | 1 | - | | 0 | 0 | 17 | 1 |
| Colombia | | | League | | Cup | | South America | | Total | |
| 2011 | Deportivo Cali (Loan) | Categoría Primera A | 6 | 1 | - | | 0 | 0 | 6 | 1 |
| Australia | | | League | | Cup | | Oceania/Asia | | Total | |
| 2012–13 | Sydney FC (Loan) | A-League | 7 | 3 | - | | - | | 14 | 5 |
| Total | Panama | | 45 | 5 | - | | 0 | 0 | 45 | 5 |
| Total | Colombia | | 6 | 1 | - | | 0 | 0 | 6 | 1 |
| Total | Australia | | 7 | 3 | - | | - | | 14 | 5 |
| Career total | | | 58 | 9 | - | | 0 | 0 | 65 | 11 |
