= Pascal Bosschaart =

Dutch retired footballer (born 1980)

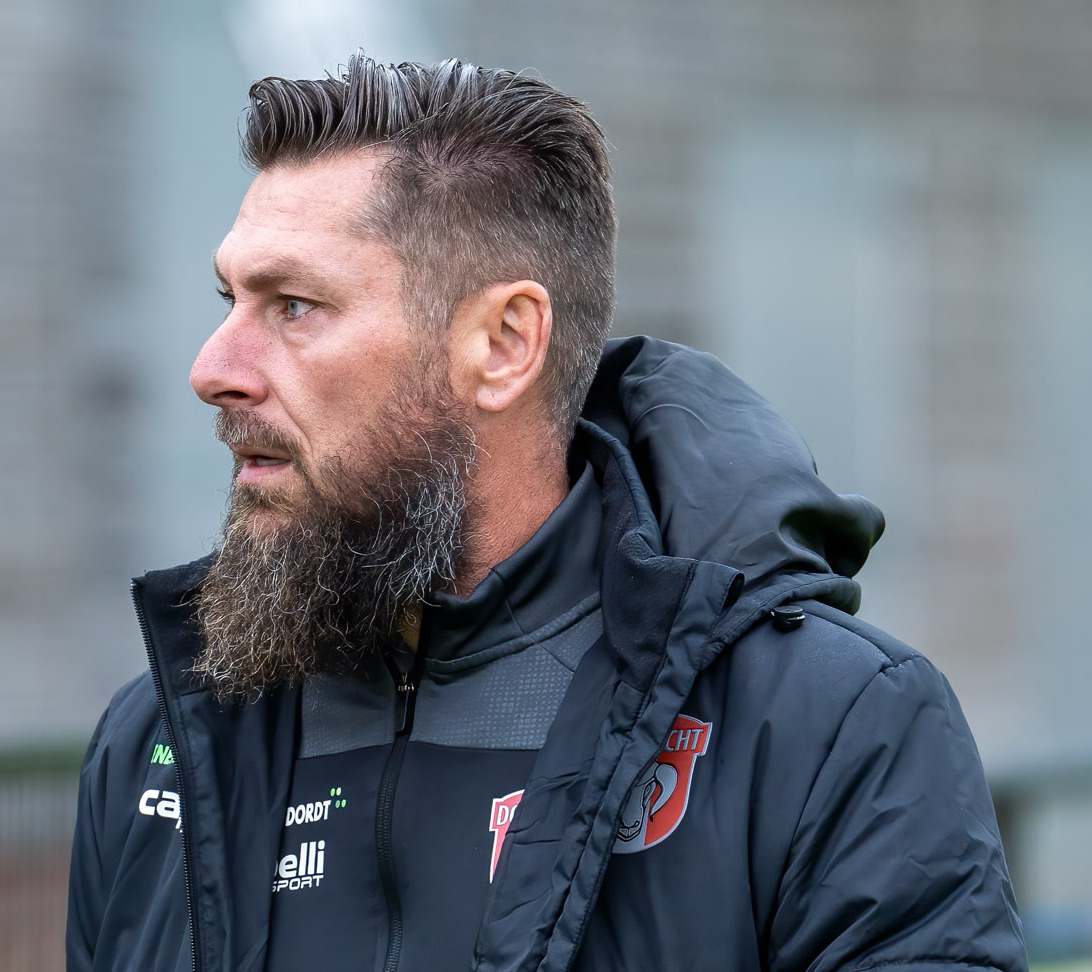
- Bosschaart in 2023 as assistant manager of FC Dordrecht

Personal information
- Full name: Pascal Bosschaart
- Date of birth: 28 February 1980 (age 46)
- Place of birth: Rotterdam, Netherlands
- Height: 1.83 m (6 ft 0 in)
- Positions: Centre back; left back

Youth career
- SC Feyenoord

Senior career*
Years	Team	Apps	(Gls)
1997–2004	Utrecht	194	(0)
2004–2006	Feyenoord	53	(0)
2006–2011	ADO Den Haag	110	(0)
2011–2013	Sydney FC	33	(1)
2014–2015	IJsselmeervogels	23	(1)
2018	IJsselmeervogels	1	(0)
Total		414	(2)

Managerial career
- 2017: IJsselmeervogels (interim)
- 2021–2022: Cambuur (interim)
- 2022: Cambuur (interim)
- 2025: Feyenoord (interim)
- * Club domestic league appearances and goals as of 2 April 2018 (UTC)

Pascal Bosschaart (born 28 February 1980 in Rotterdam) is a Dutch football coach and former player. As a player, he won the KNVB Cup twice with Utrecht, before playing for Feyenoord, ADO Den Haag and Sydney FC. After his playing career, he transitioned into coaching and became interim coach at Cambuur and Feyenoord.

== Club career ==
=== Eredivisie ===
Bosschaart made his professional league debut for Utrecht in the 1997–98 season, playing for the club until the 2003–04 season, when he was bought by Feyenoord. His first game for Feyenoord was a 6–1 victory over De Graafschap. In August 2006, he moved to ADO Den Haag. Bosschaart did not see a great deal of game time under former manager André Wetzel in the 2008–09 season, and therefore joined Helsingborgs IF on trial in February 2009. However, he was eventually not signed by the club.

=== Sydney FC ===
On 17 June 2011, he signed a one-year contract with Australian A-League club Sydney FC. On 28 December the club announced that they had re-signed the veteran defender on a two-year extension, keeping him at the Harbour City club until the end of 2014. During his first year there, he was voted the club's Most Valuable Player.

On 14 January 2012, during a game between Brisbane Roar and Sydney FC, Bosschaart was embroiled in controversy, when following the game Brisbane's Albanian striker Besart Berisha ran up behind the Dutchman and tugged him on the shoulder before running towards the tunnel, motioning that he wanted to fight Bosschaart. Players from both teams came together at the mouth of the tunnel on the halfway line to separate the belligerents, however no actual punches were thrown. It was claimed that during a match a month previously, in which Sydney FC won 2–0 and broke the Roar's 36-game unbeaten streak, Bosschaart may have provoked the Albanian by using racial taunts during the game, however this was heavily denied by Bosschaart. In 2025, it was confirmed that Bosschaart had said something about Berisha’s mother in the previous match. It was also claimed by Bosschaart that Brisbane players Ivan Franjic, Eric Paartalu and Berisha himself refused to shake hands with him before the match kicked off. After reviewing the incident post-game, the A-League's Match Review Panel (MRP) refused to punish either player over the incident, however the Football Federation Australia asked for a "please explain" from both clubs. The matter was settled by the FFA enacting a one-game ban on Berisha.

On 30 March 2012, during an elimination final against Wellington Phoenix, Bosschaart tore his Achilles tendon and had to be stretchered off. He made his long-awaited return for a home game against traditional foe Melbourne Victory on 10 November 2012, where he scored his first ever senior goal; a volley from the edge of the box to put Sydney ahead 2–0, although they ended up losing 3–2.

On 23 October 2013, Sydney FC and Bosschaart mutually agreed to part ways with the club terminating his contract effective immediately. Bosschaart only managed a handful of appearances during his last year at the club.

== Coaching career ==
Bosschaart started his coaching career as assistant manager at amateur side IJsselmeervogels, also becoming interim coach at the club. He then moved to professional side Cambuur as assistant manager, where he also became interim coach due to Henk de Jong being struck by illness.

Ahead of the 2023–24 season, Bosschaart joined Feyenoord, but was immediately moved to partner club FC Dordrecht to become assistant manager. One year later, Bosschaart moved back to Feyenoord to become the head coach of the club's Under-21 team. On 11 February 2025, Bosschaart become the interim coach at Feyenoord after Brian Priske was sacked. He made his debut a day later in the knockout phase play-offs of the UEFA Champions League in a match against AC Milan, which resulted in a 1–0 home win for Feyenoord. Six days later, Feyenoord qualified for the round of 16 with a 1–1 draw at San Siro. In the Eredivisie, Bosschaart led Feyenoord to a 0–0 draw against NAC Breda and a 2–1 win against Almere City. After Feyenoord appointed Robin van Persie as their new head coach for the first team, Bosschaart returned as head coach of the Under-21 team.

== Managerial statistics ==
As of match played 23 February 2025

Managerial record by team and tenure
Team	Nat	From	To	Record								Ref
Team	Nat	From	To	G	W	D	L	GF	GA	GD	Win %	Ref
IJsselmeervogels (interim)	(Netherlands)	17 August 2017	26 August 2017	2	1	0	1	3	3	+0	50.00	
Cambuur (interim)	(Netherlands)	3 December 2021	28 March 2023	14	2	3	9	18	31	−13	14.29	
Cambuur (interim)	(Netherlands)	20 October 2022	27 November 2022	4	0	0	4	1	5	−4	0.00	
Feyenoord (interim)	(Netherlands)	11 February 2025	23 February 2025	4	2	2	0	2	1	+1	50.00	
Total				24	5	5	14	24	40	−16	20.83	—

== Honours ==
Utrecht

- KNVB Cup: 2002–03, 2003–04
