= Fabinho (footballer, born 1985) =

Brazilian footballer (born 1985)

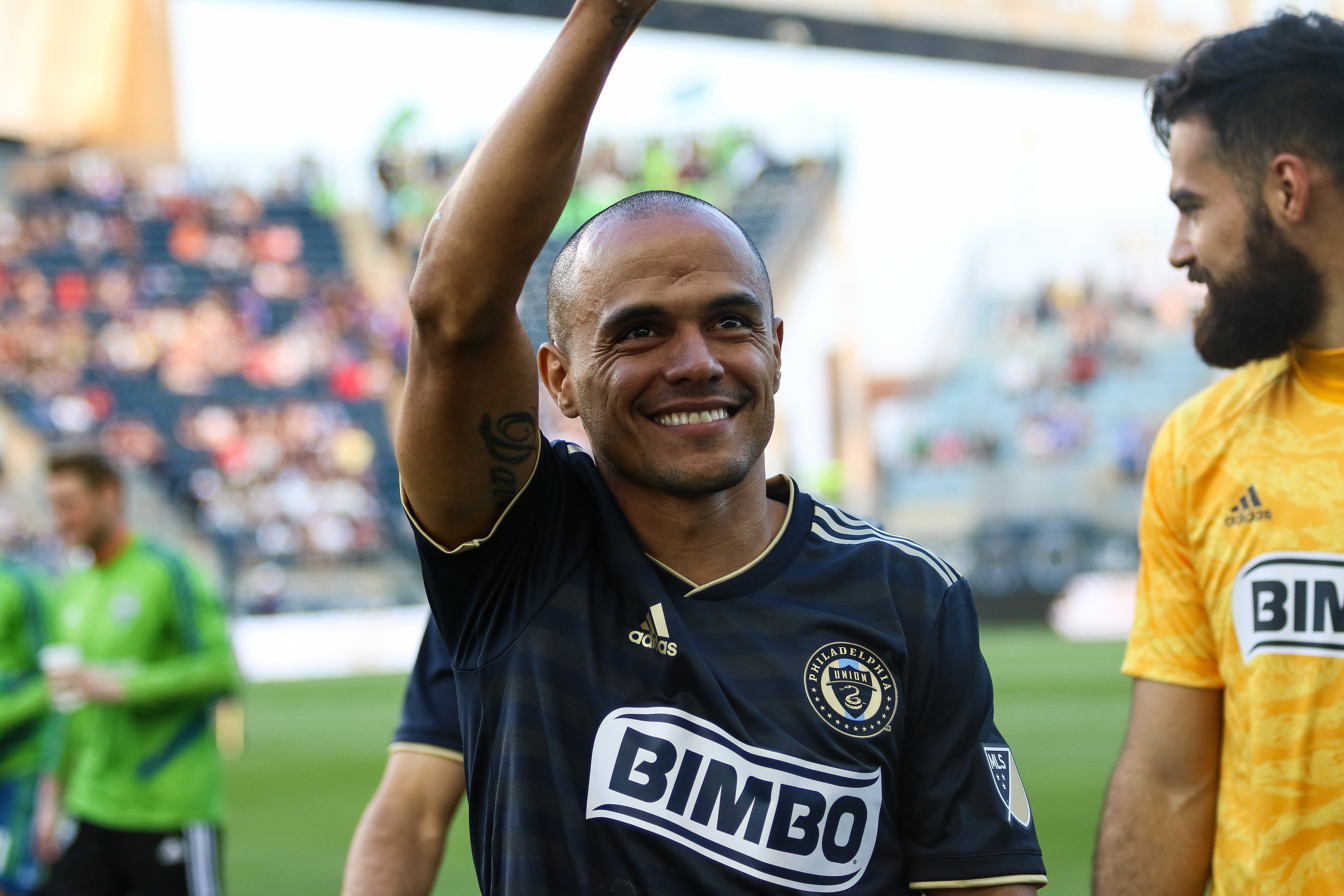
- Fabinho playing with Philadelphia Union

Personal information
- Full name: Fábio Alves Macedo
- Date of birth: 16 March 1985 (age 41)
- Place of birth: Ariquemes, Brazil
- Height: 1.70 m (5 ft 7 in)
- Position: Left-back

Youth career
- 1999: Botafogo Futebol Clube
- 2000: Grêmio Esportivo Sãocarlense
- 2001: Bandeirante
- 2002: Portuguesa Londrinense
- 2003: Flamengo
- 2004: Londrina
- 2004: Newell's Old Boys

Senior career*
Years	Team	Apps	(Gls)
2005–2006	Coritiba	5	(0)
2006	Coritiba (reserves)	8	(0)
2007	J. Malucelli	30	(1)
2008–2009	Ponte Preta	9	(0)
2009	Criciúma	5	(0)
2010	Paysandu	5	(0)
2010	Mixto	8	(0)
2011	Volta Redonda	17	(0)
2011–2012	Melbourne Victory	23	(1)
2012–2013	Sydney FC	18	(0)
2013–2019	Philadelphia Union	123	(2)
2019	→ Bethlehem Steel (loan)	2	(1)

International career
2004	Brazil U20	2	(0)
- * Club domestic league appearances and goals

Fábio Alves Macedo (born 16 March 1985) known as Fabinho, is a Brazilian former professional footballer as a left-back. He played in numerous State football leagues in Brazil during his playing career in his native country and played for the Brazil U20 national team.

== Youth career ==
Fabinho was born in Ariquemes. He began his youth career at Guairá Futebol Clube at age 12. He then played for several São Paulo-based teams in 1999 (Botafogo Futebol Clube), 2000 (Gremio Esportivo Saocarlense) and 2001 (Bandeirante). In 2002, he joined Portuguesa Londrinense. In 2003, he played for Flamengo youth team that won the Taça Belo Horizonte de Juniores and played with Londrina in the same tournament in 2004 that led to his national U20 team selection. Alves later joined Newell's Old Boys in 2004. He joined Coritiba in 2005 to start his pro career.

== Club career ==
=== Coritiba ===
Fabinho joined the team and played on its youth team before making his Série A debut on 8 May 2005 in a 1–0 win against Palmeiras as well as starting in a 4 October 2005 1–0 loss against Goiás. In 2006, he played one game for the first team in the Campeonato Paranaense, Série B and the Copa do Brasil as well as 8 games with Coritiba B, the reserve team, in the Copa Parana.

=== J Malucelli ===
In 2007, Fabinho joined J. Malucelli and started every game in which he played in the Campeonato Paranaense, the Copa Parana and the newly created Recopa Sul-Brasileira. In the Campeonato Paranaense, he played 11 games. In the Copa Parana, he played 18 games. He scored a goal in the 25 July 2006 game against Cascavel. He played both legs for J. Malucelli in its Copa Parana winning championship series against Londrina. As a result of winning the Copa Parana, J. Malucelli was one of four state tournament winners to play in the Recopa Sul-Brasileira year-end tournament. Fabinho played in the semi-final 2–1 loss to Caxias.

=== Ponte Preta ===
Fabinho joined the team in 2008 and played just two games in that year's Campeonato Paulista. Despite his lack of playing time, the team resigned him on 17 December 2008 to continue with the team in 2009. He played six games for the team in the 2009 Campeonato Paulista and one game in the Copa do Brasil. On 27 April 2009, the team announced that Fabinho was not retained for its Série B campaign that year.

=== Criciuma ===
On 2 September 2009, Fabinho joined Criciúma for the 2009 Copa Santa Catarina. He played five games in the tournament.

=== Paysandu ===
In early 2010, Fabinho joined Paysandu and participated in the team's Campeonato Paraense. He played in five games early in the campaign before leaving to join Mixto.

=== Mixto ===
On 4 March 2010, Fabinho signed with Mixto. He signed during the team's participation in the Campeonato Mato-Grossense and debuted on 21 March 2013 in a 2–2 tie with União de Rondonópolis.

Later that year, Fabinho also played with the team during its Série D, campaign. He started 8 games that season. On 14 October 2010, Fabinho left Mixto.

=== Volta Redonda ===
On 25 November 2010, Fabinho joined Volta Redonda. In the 2011 Campeonato Carioca, he started 14 games.

Fabinho then played with Volta Redonda in Série D. He only played three games due to injury and then Melbourne Victory showed interest in signing him. On 25 August 2011, it was announced that Fabinho was leaving the team to join Melbourne Victory.

=== Melbourne Victory ===
On 15 September 2011, it was announced that Fabinho had signed a one-year contract with A-League club Melbourne Victory, after an impressive trial performance in a pre-season friendly against 2010–11 A-League champions Brisbane Roar. It was his first move outside of South America. At the end of the 2011–12 A-League season, Fabio and the club parted on bitter terms as it was widely reported that he had agreed to a new contract extension with the club, only for the contract to be withdrawn as the club sought a new management structure and hired Ange Postecoglou. He expressed his displeasure regarding this incident to fans and media. Fabio scored 1 goal in his 23 games with Melbourne in a 2–2 tie against Sydney FC.

=== Sydney FC ===
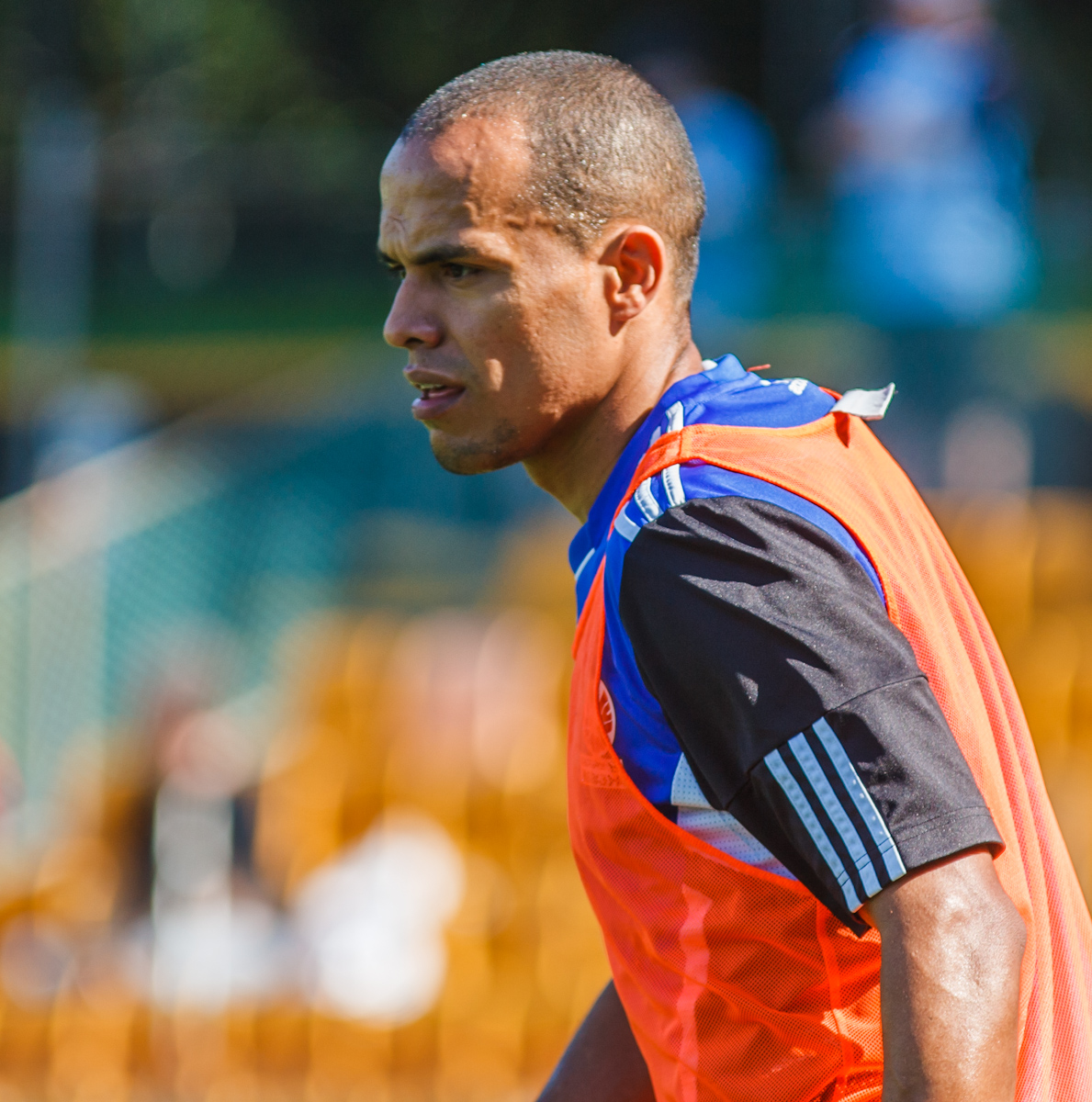
Fabio Alves warming up for a pre-season match between Sydney FC and Newcastle Jets.

On 22 May 2012, Melbourne's biggest rivals Sydney FC announced that Fabinho would be invited to train with the club on trial for a four-day period. After impressing then Sydney manager Ian Crook just two days into his trial, the club announced that they had signed Fabio to a two-year contract to fill the vacant left back spot left by Scott Jamieson who had moved to Perth Glory. He became only the second player to move to Sydney FC from rivals Melbourne Victory after Sebastian Ryall's move in 2009. After 18 appearances for Sydney FC, it was announced that Fabio and the club had decided to mutually terminate his contract on 22 April 2013.

=== Philadelphia Union ===
After a successful trial, Fabinho signed with the Philadelphia Union of Major League Soccer on 28 June 2013. He made his debut as a left midfielder substitute on 12 July 2013 against Chivas USA and assisted on the final goal scored by Conor Casey in a 3–1 Union victory. Fabio got his first start in a 29 July 2013 2–0 loss in a friendly against Stoke City Football Club. He would then make two other regular season appearances as a left midfielder substitute before making his first left back substitute appearance on 3 August 2013 2–1 loss to Chicago Fire in place of injured starter, Raymon Gaddis. On 17 August 2013 in his first regular season start at left back, he again assisted on a Conor Casey goal in the Union's 2–0 victory over DC United. On 31 August 2013, Fabinho was named Sports Illustrated's MLS "Player of the Day" for his all-around performance in a 0–0 tie with Montreal Impact. On 19 October 2013, he scored his first career MLS goal against the Montreal Impact.

After the trade of defender Sheanon Williams to the Houston Dynamo during the 2015 season, Fabio earned a starting role regularly in the Philadelphia Union lineup. A high point of the season was his entrance into the Union's third round match in the 2015 Lamar Hunt U.S. Open Cup vs. D.C. United. Following a red card to Union Forward C. J. Sapong in the 1st half, Manager Jim Curtin subbed in Fabio at a left wing position to gather some offense for the ten man squad. Originally down 1–0, the Union fought back to tie up the match on an Eric Ayuk goal. Later on in the 79th minute, Fabio made a run down the left side of the field in towards the box. Just in front of the frame of goal, Fabio sent a hard shot into the back of the net over the GK Andrew Dykstra also feeling pressure from a defender. The improbable comeback victory over the Union's I-95 rivals will mark the 2015 U.S. Open Cup run.

Fabinho was released by Philadelphia on 20 November 2019.

== International career ==
On 28 July 2004, Fabinho was selected to represent the Brazil U-20 team at the SBS International Youth Soccer Cup in Shizuoka, Japan. His performance with Londrina in the 2004 Taça Belo Horizonte de Juniores lead to his national team selection. He played all 3 games at left back in the tournament, including 19 August 2004 opening game 2–1 victory against a Shizuoka select team as well as full internationals against Turkey on 22 August 2004 and Japan on 24 August 2004. Brazil won the tournament.

== Style of play ==
A left-back, Fabinho was known for his attacking and crossing abilities.

== Personal life ==
Alves earned his U.S. green card in summer 2015. This status also qualifies him as a domestic player for MLS roster purposes.
