= 2011–12 Wellington Phoenix FC season =

Wellington Phoenix FC
2011–12 season
- CEO: Nathan Greenham
- Chairman: Rob Morrison
- Manager: Ricki Herbert
- A-League: 4th
- Finals: Second round
- Top goalscorer: Paul Ifill; 8 goals
- Highest home attendance: 20,078 v Adelaide; 19 November 2011
- Lowest home attendance: 3,898 v Perth; 8 January 2012
| Home colours | Away colours |

The 2011–12 season was the Wellington Phoenix's fifth season in the A-League. After placing 4th at the conclusion of the regular season, the Phoenix's title hopes came to an end in the second round of the finals series, losing 3–2 to Perth in extra time.

== Players ==
=== First team squad ===
As of 13 January 2012.

Note: Flags indicate national team as defined under FIFA eligibility rules; some limited exceptions apply. Players may hold more than one non-FIFA nationality.

| No. | Pos. | Nation | Player |
|---|---|---|---|
| 1 | GK | NZL | Mark Paston |
| 2 | MF | MLT | Manny Muscat |
| 3 | DF | NZL | Tony Lochhead |
| 4 | DF | AUS | Brent Griffiths (Youth) |
| 6 | MF | NZL | Tim Brown (Vice-Captain) |
| 7 | MF | NZL | Leo Bertos |
| 8 | FW | BRB | Paul Ifill |
| 9 | FW | ENG | Chris Greenacre |
| 11 | MF | BRA | Daniel |
| 12 | MF | AUS | Nick Ward |
| 13 | DF | AUS | Niko Tsattalios (Youth) |

| No. | Pos. | Nation | Player |
|---|---|---|---|
| 14 | FW | AUS | Mirjan Pavlovic |
| 15 | DF | NZL | Cameron Lindsay (Youth) |
| 17 | MF | AUS | Vince Lia |
| 18 | DF | NZL | Ben Sigmund |
| 19 | DF | AUS | Jimmy Downey |
| 20 | GK | TTO | Tony Warner |
| 21 | MF | ESP | Dani Sánchez |
| 22 | DF | AUS | Andrew Durante (Captain) |
| 23 | MF | AUS | Lucas Pantelis |
| 24 | FW | USA | Alex Smith |

=== Contract extensions ===
| No. | Pos. | Name | Extension | Contract end |
|---|---|---|---|---|
| 8 | FW | (Barbados) Paul Ifill | 2 years | 2014 |
| 22 | DF | (Australia) Andrew Durante | 3 years | 2015 |
| 24 | MF | (United States) Alex Smith | 1/2 year | 2012 |
| 2 | MF | (Malta) Manny Muscat | 2 years | 2014 |

=== Transfers ===
==== In ====
| No. | Pos. | Player | From† | Date | Notes |
|---|---|---|---|---|---|
| 19 | DF | (Australia) Jimmy Downey | (Australia) Oakleigh Cannons | 5 May 2011 | |
| 22 | DF | (Australia) Andrew Durante | (Australia) Sydney FC | 10 May 2011 | Loan Return |
| 23 | FW | (Australia) Lucas Pantelis | (Australia) Adelaide United | 15 May 2011 | |
| 13 | DF | (Australia) Nikolas Tsattalios | (Australia) Sutherland Sharks | 19 July 2011 | |
| 20 | GK | (Trinidad and Tobago) Tony Warner | (England) Tranmere Rovers | 17 August 2011 | |
| 21 | MF | (Spain) Dani Sánchez | ( (Scotland) Inverness CT) | 5 September 2011 | |
| 4 | DF | (Australia) Brent Griffiths | ( (Australia) Perth Glory) | 30 September 2011 | |
| 12 | MF | (Australia) Nick Ward | (Greece) Iraklis | 3 October 2011 | |
| 15 | DF | (New Zealand) Cameron Lindsay | (England) Blackburn Rovers Academy | 5 October 2011 | |
| 24 | FW | (United States) Alex Smith | (Australia) Sydney Olympic | 7 October 2011 | |
| 30 | GK | (England) Phil Imray | (New Zealand) Team Wellington | 15 October 2011 | Short-term injury cover |

† Brackets round club names indicate the player's contract with that club had expired before he joined Wellington Phoenix.

==== Out ====
| No. | Pos. | Player | To† | Date | Notes |
|---|---|---|---|---|---|
| 19 | GK | (Australia) Danny Vukovic | (Australia) Perth Glory | 14 November 2010 | |
| 13 | DF | (Australia) Troy Hearfield | (Australia) Central Coast Mariners | 17 February 2011 | |
| 15 | DF | (Australia) Jade North | (Japan) F.C. Tokyo | 20 February 2011 | |
| 21 | MF | (New Zealand) Marco Rojas | (Australia) Melbourne Victory | 11 March 2011 | |
| 10 | MF | (Argentina) Oscar Roberto Cornejo | ( (Argentina) Atlético Santa Rosa) | 29 June 2011 | |
| 23 | FW | (Australia) Dylan Macallister | (Iceland) Breiðablik | 29 June 2011 | |
| 5 | MF | (Brazil) Diego | ( (United States) Charleston Battery) | 29 June 2011 | |
| 12 | DF | (New Zealand) James Musa | ( (New Zealand) Team Wellington) | 29 June 2011 | |
| 20 | GK | (Australia) Reece Crowther | Released | 29 June 2011 | |
| 4 | MF | (Australia) Nick Ward | ( (Greece) Iraklis) | 29 June 2011 | |

† Brackets round a club denote the player joined that club after his Phoenix contract expired.

==== Loans out ====
| No. | Pos. | Player | To† | Date | Duration |
|---|---|---|---|---|---|
| 22 | DF | (Australia) Andrew Durante | (Australia) Sydney FC | 21 February 2011 | 3 months |

== Matches ==
=== 2011–12 pre-season friendlies ===
| 6 July 2011 | Miramar Rangers (New Zealand) | 0–2 | (New Zealand) Wellington Phoenix | Te Whaea, Wellington |
| | | Report | Daniel; M. Pavlovic |

| 13 July 2011 | Wellington Phoenix (New Zealand) | 6–1 | (New Zealand) Western Suburbs FC |
| | | Report |

| 17 July 2011 | New Zealand U-20 | 1–2 | (New Zealand) Wellington Phoenix | North Harbour Stadium, Auckland |
| 14:00 NZST | S. Lovemore 52' | Report | 61' J. Downey; 90+3' D. Sánchez | Attendance: 4,083 |

| 20 July 2011 | Waitakere United (New Zealand) | 1–3 | (New Zealand) Wellington Phoenix | Trusts Stadium, Auckland |
| 19:30 NZST | C. Bale 40' | Report | 23' P. Ifill; M. Pavlovic 48', 82' |

| 14 August 2011 | Wellington Rep XI (New Zealand) | 0–3 | (New Zealand) Wellington Phoenix | Weka Park, Raumati Beach |
| 14:00 NZST | | Report |

| 20 August 2011 | Wellington Phoenix (New Zealand) | 1–5 | (Australia) Brisbane Roar | Forsyth Barr Stadium, Dunedin |
| 17:30 NZST | M. Rigters 67' | (0–1); Report | 45+2', 90+1' J. Meyer; 50' M. Nichols; 57', 72' T. Broich | Attendance: 15,037 |

| 26 August 2011 | Melbourne Heart (Australia) | 2–2 | (New Zealand) Wellington Phoenix | Deakin Reserve, Shepparton |
| 21:30 | J. Hoffman 27'; D. Williams 54' | Report | 63' D. Sánchez; 77' L. Bertos |

| 25 September 2011 | Wellington Phoenix (New Zealand) | 0–2 | (Australia) Central Coast Mariners | Baypark Stadium, Tauranga |
| 15:00 NZDT | | Report | 40' P. Zwaanswijk; 79' B. Ibini-Isei | Attendance: 3,000 |

| 2 October 2011 | Team Wellington (New Zealand) | 0–4 | (New Zealand) Wellington Phoenix | David Farrington Park, Wellington |
| | | Report; Highlights | 35', 40' D. Sánchez; 60' L. Bertos; 78' C. Greenacre |

=== 2011–12 A-League fixtures ===
| 9 October 2011 Round 1 | Gold Coast United | 1–1 | Wellington Phoenix | Skilled Park, Gold Coast |
| 16:00 AEDT; 19:00 NZDT Gold Coast Starting XI: 01 (New Zealand) GK Glen Moss; 03 (Australia) DF Michael Thwaite (c); 06 (Netherlands) DF Paul Beekmans (substituted off) 80'; 08 (Brazil) MF Robson; 12 (Australia) FW Dylan Macallister (substituted off) 73'; 13 (Australia) DF Ante Rožić; 14 (Australia) MF Ben Halloran; 15 (Ivory Coast) DF Adama Traoré; 18 (Australia) MF James Brown; 22 (Netherlands) MF Peter Jungschläger; 23 (Australia) DF Dylan McGowan (substituted off) 57'; Substitutes: 20 (Australia) GK Jerrad Tyson; 09 (Australia) FW Joel Porter (substituted on) 57'; 10 (Australia) FW Tahj Minniecon (substituted on) 73'; 21 (Australia) MF Daniel Severino (substituted on) 80' | J. Brown 87' | (0–1); Report; Summary; 21 Shots 7; 11 Shots on Target 5; 11 Fouls Committed 15; 9 Corners 5; 3 Offsides 1; 49% Possession 51% | 17' C. Greenacre; (yellow card) 83' A. Durante; (yellow card) 90' N. Ward | Attendance: 4,113; Referee: (Australia) Gerard Parsons Wellington Starting XI: 01 (New Zealand) GK Mark Paston; 02 (Malta) DF Manny Muscat; 03 (New Zealand) DF Tony Lochhead; 06 (New Zealand) MF Tim Brown; 07 (New Zealand) MF Leo Bertos; 08 (Barbados) FW Paul Ifill (substituted off) 52'; 09 (England) FW Chris Greenacre; 17 (Australia) MF Vince Lia (substituted off) 49'; 18 (New Zealand) DF Ben Sigmund; 21 (Spain) MF Dani Sánchez (substituted off) 68'; 22 (Australia) DF Andrew Durante (c); Substitutes: 20 (Trinidad and Tobago) GK Tony Warner; 11 (Brazil) MF Daniel (substituted on) 52'; 12 (Australia) MF Nick Ward (substituted on) 49'; 19 (Australia) DF Jimmy Downey (substituted on) 68' |

| 16 October 2011 Round 2 | Wellington Phoenix | 2–0 | Newcastle Jets | Westpac Stadium, Wellington |
| 16:30 NZDT; 14:30 AEDT Wellington Starting XI: 20 (Trinidad and Tobago) GK Tony Warner; 02 (Malta) DF Manny Muscat; 03 (New Zealand) DF Tony Lochhead; 06 (New Zealand) MF Tim Brown; 07 (New Zealand) MF Leo Bertos; 08 (Barbados) FW Paul Ifill (substituted off) 14'; 09 (England) FW Chris Greenacre; 12 (Australia) MF Nick Ward; 18 (New Zealand) DF Ben Sigmund; 21 (Spain) MF Dani Sánchez (substituted off) 84'; 22 (Australia) DF Andrew Durante (c); Substitutes: 30 (England) GK Phil Imray; 04 (Australia) DF Brent Griffiths; 11 (Brazil) MF Daniel (substituted on) 14'; 24 (United States) ST Alex Smith (substituted on) 84' | T. Brown 18' (yellow card) 69' (yellow-red card) 90'; T. Lochhead (yellow card) 22'; Daniel 60'; M. Muscat (yellow card) 66'; N. Ward (yellow card) 70' (red card) 82' | (1–0); Report; Summary; 13 Shots 7; 5 Shots on Target 3; 11 Fouls Committed 11; 6 Corners 3; 5 Offsides 2; 47% Possession 53% | | Attendance: 7,643; Referee: (Australia) Matthew Gillett Newcastle Starting XI: 20 (Australia) GK Ben Kennedy; 04 (Australia) DF Nikolai Topor-Stanley; 05 (Brazil) DF Tiago; 06 (Australia) MF Ben Kantarovski; 07 (Australia) MF Kasey Wehrman (substituted off) 80'; 08 (New Zealand) FW Jeremy Brockie (substituted off) 68'; 11 (Australia) DF Tarek Elrich; 12 (Australia) MF Jobe Wheelhouse (c); 13 (South Korea) DF Byun Sung-Hwan; 18 (Australia) FW Marko Jesic (substituted off) 56'; 23 (Australia) FW Ryan Griffiths; Substitutes: 19 (Australia) GK Matthew Nash; 02 (Australia) DF Taylor Regan (substituted on) 80'; 17 (Australia) ST James Virgili (substituted on) 68'; 22 (Iraq) MF Ali Abbas (substituted on) 56' |

| 23 October 2011 Round 3 | Perth Glory | 1–0 | Wellington Phoenix | nib Stadium, Perth |
| 16:30 AWST; 21:30 NZDT Perth Starting XI: 01 (Australia) GK Danny Vukovic; 03 (Netherlands) DF Bas van den Brink; 04 (Republic of Ireland) FW Billy Mehmet; 06 (Australia) DF Chris Coyne; 07 (Australia) MF Jacob Burns (c); 09 (New Zealand) FW Shane Smeltz; 10 (Republic of Ireland) MF Liam Miller (substituted off) 85'; 12 (Australia) DF Scott Neville; 13 (Australia) MF Travis Dodd (substituted off) 63'; 17 (Australia) MF Todd Howarth; 27 (Brazil) MF Andrezinho (substituted off) 73'; Substitutes: 30 (Australia) GK Lewis Italiano; 02 (Australia) DF Josh Mitchell (substituted on) 85'; 14 (Scotland) MF Steven McGarry (substituted on) 73'; 15 (Australia) FW Tommy Amphlett (substituted on) 63' | L. Miller (yellow card) 18'; S. Smeltz 32'; C. Coyne (yellow card) 82' | (1–0); Summary; 8 Shots 12; 5 Shots on Target 2; 13 Fouls Committed 12; 4 Corners 7; 4 Offsides 4; 48% Possession 52% | (yellow card) 7' B. Sigmund; (yellow card) 12' (yellow-red card) 90' M. Muscat; (yellow card) 32' Daniel | Attendance: 8,299; Referee: (Australia) Ben Williams Wellington Starting XI: 20 (Trinidad and Tobago) GK Tony Warner; 02 (Malta) DF Manny Muscat; 03 (New Zealand) DF Tony Lochhead; 07 (New Zealand) MF Leo Bertos; 09 (England) FW Chris Greenacre; 11 (Brazil) MF Daniel (substituted off) 75'; 12 (Australia) MF Nick Ward; 18 (New Zealand) DF Ben Sigmund; 21 (Spain) MF Dani Sánchez; 22 (Australia) DF Andrew Durante (c); 24 (United States) ST Alex Smith; Substitutes: 01 (New Zealand) GK Mark Paston; 04 (Australia) DF Brent Griffiths; 13 (Australia) DF Nikolas Tsattalios (substituted on) 75'; 15 (New Zealand) MF Cameron Lindsay |

| 30 October 2011 Round 4 | Wellington Phoenix | 1–2 | Melbourne Victory | Westpac Stadium, Wellington |
| 16:30 NZDT; 14:30 AEDT Wellington Starting XI: 20 (Trinidad and Tobago) GK Tony Warner; 03 (New Zealand) DF Tony Lochhead; 06 (New Zealand) MF Tim Brown; 07 (New Zealand) MF Leo Bertos; 09 (England) FW Chris Greenacre; 11 (Brazil) MF Daniel (substituted off) 77'; 13 (Australia) DF Nikolas Tsattalios; 18 (New Zealand) DF Ben Sigmund; 21 (Spain) MF Dani Sánchez; 22 (Australia) DF Andrew Durante (c); 24 (United States) ST Alex Smith (substituted off) 68'; Substitutes: 01 (New Zealand) GK Mark Paston; 04 (Australia) DF Brent Griffiths (substituted on) 68'; 12 (Australia) MF Nick Ward (substituted on) 77'; 15 (New Zealand) MF Cameron Lindsay | Ben Sigmund (yellow card) 54' (red card) 66'; D. Sánchez (yellow card) 60' (goal) 71' | (0–1); Report; Summary; 18 Shots 9; 8 Shots on Target 3; 16 Fouls Committed 9; 2 Corners 9; 1 Offsides 2; 44% Possession 56% | 42' A. Thompson; (yellow card) 53' T. Pondeljak; 67' (pen.) C. Hernández; (yellow card) 82' Fabio | Attendance: 9,369; Referee: (Australia) Peter Green Melbourne Starting XI: 21 (Australia) GK Ante Čović; 02 (Australia) DF Matthew Foschini; 03 (Brazil) DF Fabio; 06 (Australia) MF Leigh Broxham; 09 (Costa Rica) FW Jean Carlos Solórzano (substituted off) 72'; 10 (Australia) FW Archie Thompson; 12 (Australia) DF Rodrigo Vargas; 15 (Australia) MF Tom Pondeljak (substituted off) 64'; 16 (Costa Rica) MF Carlos Hernández; 22 (Australia) FW Harry Kewell (substituted off) 89'; 23 (Australia) DF Adrian Leijer (c); Substitutes: 20 (Australia) GK Lawrence Thomas; 11 (New Zealand) MF Marco Rojas (substituted on) 64'; 14 (Australia) MF Billy Celeski (substituted on) 89'; 18 (Australia) FW Danny Allsopp (substituted on) 72' |

| 4 November 2011 Round 5 | Wellington Phoenix | 1–2 | Central Coast Mariners | Westpac Stadium, Wellington |
| 19:30 NZDT; 17:30 AEDT Wellington Starting XI: 20 (Trinidad and Tobago) GK Tony Warner; 02 (Malta) DF Manny Muscat; 03 (New Zealand) DF Tony Lochhead; 04 (Australia) DF Brent Griffiths; 06 (New Zealand) MF Tim Brown; 07 (New Zealand) MF Leo Bertos (substituted off) 65'; 09 (England) FW Chris Greenacre; 11 (Brazil) MF Daniel (substituted off) 81'; 21 (Spain) MF Dani Sánchez; 22 (Australia) DF Andrew Durante (c); 24 (United States) ST Alex Smith; Substitutes: 01 (New Zealand) GK Mark Paston; 12 (Australia) MF Nick Ward (substituted on) 65'; 13 (Australia) DF Nikolas Tsattalios (substituted on) 81'; 15 (New Zealand) MF Cameron Lindsay | C. Greenacre 68' | (0–0); Report; Summary; 10 Shots 16; 3 Shots on Target 7; 14 Fouls Committed 15; 5 Corners 5; 5 Offsides 5; 52% Possession 48% | (yellow card) 11' O. Bozanic; 47' B. Ibini-Isei; 80' M. Simon | Attendance: 5,090; Referee: (Australia) Gerard Parsons Central Coast Starting XI: 01 (Australia) GK Mat Ryan; 02 (Australia) FW Daniel McBreen; 03 (Australia) DF Joshua Rose; 04 (Australia) DF Pedj Bojic; 06 (Netherlands) DF Patrick Zwaanswijk; 08 (Australia) MF Rostyn Griffiths; 09 (Australia) FW Bernie Ibini-Isei (substituted off) 73'; 11 (Australia) MF Oliver Bozanic (substituted off) 90'; 14 (New Zealand) MF Michael McGlinchey; 18 (Australia) DF Alex Wilkinson; 19 (Australia) FW Matt Simon (substituted off) 86'; Substitutes: 05 (Australia) MF Brad Porter (substituted on) 90'; 12 (Australia) MF Troy Hearfield (substituted on) 73'; 22 (Australia) MF Mustafa Amini (substituted on) 86'; 20 (Australia) GK Justin Pasfield |

| 13 November 2011 Round 6 | Brisbane Roar | 1–1 | Wellington Phoenix | Suncorp Stadium, Brisbane |
| 19:00 NZDT; 17:00 AEDT Brisbane Starting XI: 01 (Australia) GK Michael Theoklitos; 02 (Australia) DF Matt Smith (c); 03 (Australia) DF Shane Stefanutto; 04 (Australia) DF Matthew Jurman; 05 (Australia) DF Ivan Franjic; 06 (Australia) MF Erik Paartalu; 07 (Albania) FW Besart Berisha; 08 (Australia) MF Massimo Murdocca (substituted off) 67'; 10 (Brazil) FW Henrique (substituted off) 61'; 11 (Canada) MF Issey Nakajima-Farran; 22 (Germany) MF Thomas Broich; Substitutes: 09 (Australia) FW Kofi Danning (substituted on) 61'; 16 (Bahrain) DF Sayed Mohamed Adnan; 18 (Australia) MF Luke Brattan (substituted on) 67'; 30 (Australia) GK Matt Acton | B. Berisha 11'; I. Franjic (yellow card) 53' | (1–1); Report; Summary; 17 Shots 4; 10 Shots on Target 2; 13 Fouls Committed 17; 4 Corners 2; 4 Offsides 5; 60% Possession 40% | (yellow card) 19' N. Ward; (yellow card) 26' M. Muscat; 37' T. Brown; (yellow card) 53' A. Smith | Attendance: 16,428; Referee: (Australia) Jarred Gillett Wellington Starting XI: 20 (Trinidad and Tobago) GK Tony Warner; 02 (Malta) DF Manny Muscat; 03 (New Zealand) DF Tony Lochhead; 06 (New Zealand) MF Tim Brown; 07 (New Zealand) MF Leo Bertos; 09 (England) FW Chris Greenacre; 11 (Brazil) MF Daniel (substituted off) 73'; 12 (Australia) MF Nick Ward; 18 (New Zealand) DF Ben Sigmund (substituted off) 84'; 22 (Australia) DF Andrew Durante (c); 24 (United States) ST Alex Smith; Substitutes: 01 (New Zealand) GK Mark Paston; 04 (Australia) DF Brent Griffiths (substituted on) 84'; 13 (Australia) DF Nikolas Tsattalios (substituted on) 73'; 21 (Spain) MF Dani Sánchez |

| 19 November 2011 Round 7 | Wellington Phoenix | 1–1 | Adelaide United | Eden Park, Auckland |
| 17:00 NZDT; 19:30 ACST Wellington Starting XI: 20 (Trinidad and Tobago) GK Tony Warner; 02 (Malta) DF Manny Muscat; 03 (New Zealand) DF Tony Lochhead; 06 (New Zealand) MF Tim Brown; 07 (New Zealand) MF Leo Bertos; 09 (England) FW Chris Greenacre; 12 (Australia) MF Nick Ward (substituted off) 72'; 17 (Australia) MF Vince Lia (substituted off) 88'; 18 (New Zealand) DF Ben Sigmund; 22 (Australia) DF Andrew Durante (c); 24 (United States) ST Alex Smith (substituted off) 58'; Substitutes: 01 (New Zealand) GK Mark Paston; 04 (Australia) DF Brent Griffiths (substituted on) 88'; 13 (Barbados) FW Paul Ifill (substituted on) 58'; 11 (Brazil) MF Daniel (substituted on) 72' | C. Greenacre (yellow card) 24'; T. Brown (yellow card) 38'; V. Lia (yellow card) 77'; N. Boogard 83' (o.g.) | (0–1); Report; Summary; 4 Shots 4; 1 Shots on Target 2; 18 Fouls Committed 19; 9 Corners 3; 6 Offsides 1; 54% Possession 46% | (yellow card) 33' S. Dilevski; 44' (yellow card) 90' B. Djite; (yellow card) 67' F. Usucar; (yellow card) 80' Z. Caravella | Attendance: 20,078; Referee: (Australia) Peter Green Adelaide Starting XI: 01 (Australia) GK Eugene Galeković; 03 (Australia) DF Nigel Boogaard; 04 (Australia) DF Jon McKain; 06 (Brazil) DF Cássio (substituted off) 38'; 07 (Australia) MF Zenon Caravella; 10 (Australia) MF Dario Vidošić (substituted off) 89'; 11 (Australia) FW Bruce Djite; 14 (Australia) MF Cameron Watson; 16 (Australia) DF Spase Dilevski; 17 (Australia) MF Iain Ramsay (substituted off) 81'; 21 (Uruguay) MF Francisco Usúcar; Substitutes: 39 (Australia) GK Nick Munro; 02 (Australia) DF Osama Malik (substituted on) 38'; 13 (Portugal) MF Ricardo Da Silva (substituted on) 89'; 18 (Australia) MF Fabian Barbiero (substituted on) 81' |

| 27 November 2011 Round 8 | Wellington Phoenix | 2–1 | Sydney FC | Westpac Stadium, Wellington |
| 16:30 NZDT; 14:30 AEDT Wellington Starting XI: 20 (Trinidad and Tobago) GK Tony Warner; 02 (Malta) MF Manny Muscat; 03 (New Zealand) DF Tony Lochhead; 06 (New Zealand) MF Tim Brown; 07 (New Zealand) MF Leo Bertos; 08 (Barbados) FW Paul Ifill (substituted off) 60'; 09 (England) FW Chris Greenacre; 12 (Australia) MF Nick Ward; 17 (Australia) MF Vince Lia; 18 (New Zealand) DF Ben Sigmund; 22 (Australia) DF Andrew Durante (c); Substitutes: 01 (New Zealand) GK Mark Paston; 11 (Brazil) MF Daniel; 14 (Australia) FW Mirjan Pavlovic (substituted on) 60'; 24 (United States) FW Alex Smith | P. Ifill 7'; T. Brown 59'; A. Durante (yellow card) 71'; M. Muscat (yellow card) 73' | (1–0); Report; Summary; 13 Shots 4; 7 Shots on Target 2; 10 Fouls Committed 5; 9 Corners 5; 3 Offsides 1; 50% Possession 50% | (yellow card) 62' S. Jamieson; 70' B. Cazarine | Attendance: 6,308; Referee: (Australia) Ryan Shepheard Sydney Starting XI: 01 (Australia) GK Liam Reddy; 03 (Australia) DF Jamie Coyne (substituted off) 76'; 04 (Netherlands) DF Pascal Bosschaart; 05 (Australia) DF Michael Beauchamp; 07 (Australia) MF Brett Emerton; 08 (Slovakia) MF Karol Kisel; 10 (Australia) MF Nick Carle; 15 (Northern Ireland) MF Terry McFlynn (c); 17 (Australia) MF Terry Antonis (substituted off) 55'; 19 (Australia) FW Mark Bridge (substituted off) 65'; 21 (Australia) DF Scott Jamieson; Substitutes: 20 (Australia) GK Ivan Necevski; 09 (Brazil) FW Bruno Cazarine (substituted on) 55'; 18 (Finland) FW Juho Mäkelä (substituted on) 65'; 12 (Australia) DF Shannon Cole (substituted on) 76' |

| 4 December 2011 Round 9 | Melbourne Heart | 1–0 | Wellington Phoenix | Latrobe City Stadium, Morwell |
| 15:00 AEDT; 17:00 NZDT Melbourne Starting XI: 01 (Australia) GK Clint Bolton; 02 (Australia) DF Michael Marrone; 03 (Australia) DF Brendan Hamill; 05 (Brazil) MF Fred (c); 06 (Australia) DF Matt Thompson; 07 (Netherlands) MF Rutger Worm (substituted off) 80'; 13 (Argentina) DF Jonatan Germano; 16 (Australia) DF Aziz Behich; 19 (Australia) FW Eli Babalj (substituted off) 64'; 23 (Australia) MF Mate Dugandžić; 25 (Australia) DF Adrian Madaschi (substituted off) 88'; Substitutes: 30 (Australia) GK Sebastian Mattei; 18 (Australia) DF Curtis Good (substituted on) 88'; 09 (Brazil) FW Maycon (substituted on) 80'; 17 (Australia) FW Jason Hoffman (substituted on) 64' | M. Dugandzic 40'; A. Madaschi (yellow card) 70' | (1–0); Summary; Report; 8 Shots 11; 5 Shots on Target 5; 13 Fouls Committed 14; 3 Corners 8; 2 Offsides 3; 54% Possession 46% | | Attendance: 2,951; Referee: (Australia) Ben Williams Wellington Starting XI: 20 (Trinidad and Tobago) GK Tony Warner; 02 (Malta) MF Manny Muscat; 03 (New Zealand) DF Tony Lochhead; 06 (New Zealand) MF Tim Brown; 07 (New Zealand) MF Leo Bertos; 08 (Barbados) FW Paul Ifill; 09 (England) FW Chris Greenacre (substituted off) 65'; 12 (Australia) MF Nick Ward (substituted off) 59'; 17 (Australia) MF Vince Lia; 18 (New Zealand) DF Ben Sigmund; 22 (Australia) DF Andrew Durante (c); Substitutes: 01 (New Zealand) GK Mark Paston; 11 (Brazil) MF Daniel; 14 (Australia) FW Mirjan Pavlovic (substituted on) 59'; 21 (Spain) MF Dani Sánchez (substituted on) 65' |

| 10 December 2011 Round 10 | Wellington Phoenix | 1–0 | Perth Glory | Westpac Stadium, Wellington |
| 17:00 NZDT; 12:00 AWST Wellington Starting XI: 20 (Trinidad and Tobago) GK Tony Warner; 02 (Malta) MF Manny Muscat; 03 (New Zealand) DF Tony Lochhead (substituted off) 90'; 06 (New Zealand) MF Tim Brown; 07 (New Zealand) MF Leo Bertos; 08 (Barbados) FW Paul Ifill; 09 (England) FW Chris Greenacre (substituted off) 83'; 17 (Australia) MF Vince Lia; 18 (New Zealand) DF Ben Sigmund; 21 (Spain) MF Dani Sánchez (substituted off) 76'; 22 (Australia) DF Andrew Durante (c); Substitutes: 01 (New Zealand) GK Mark Paston; 11 (Brazil) MF Daniel (substituted on) 90'; 12 (Australia) MF Nick Ward (substituted on) 83'; 14 (Australia) FW Mirjan Pavlovic (substituted on) 76' | P. Ifill (yellow card) 30'; T. Lochhead (yellow card) 31'; T. Brown (yellow card) 40'; B. Sigmund 85'; M. Pavlovic (red card) 90+4' | (0–0); Summary; Report; 10 Shots 9; 5 Shots on Target 4; 18 Fouls Committed 13; 6 Corners 1; 0 Offsides 1; 55% Possession 45% | (yellow card) 64' T. Howarth; (yellow card) 88' J. Mitchell | Attendance: 6,020; Referee: (Australia) Ryan Shepheard Perth Starting XI: 01 (Australia) GK Danny Vukovic; 02 (Australia) DF Josh Mitchell; 03 (Netherlands) DF Bas van den Brink; 07 (Australia) MF Jacob Burns (c); 08 (Australia) MF Adam Hughes; 09 (New Zealand) FW Shane Smeltz; 10 (Republic of Ireland) MF Liam Miller; 17 (Australia) MF Todd Howarth; 21 (Australia) FW Mile Sterjovski (substituted off) 71'; 25 (Australia) DF Trent McClenahan (substituted off) 88'; 27 (Brazil) MF Andrezinho (substituted off) 77'; Substitutes: 30 (Australia) GK Lewis Italiano; 04 (Republic of Ireland) FW Billy Mehmet (substituted on) 77'; 05 (Australia) DF Steve Pantelidis (substituted on) 88'; 15 (Australia) FW Tommy Amphlett (substituted on) 71' |

| 14 December 2011 Round 11 | Wellington Phoenix | 2–0 | Brisbane Roar | Forsyth Barr Stadium, Dunedin |
| 19:30 NZDT; 17:30 AEDT Wellington Starting XI: 20 (Trinidad and Tobago) GK Tony Warner; 02 (Malta) MF Manny Muscat; 04 (Australia) DF Brent Griffiths; 06 (New Zealand) MF Tim Brown; 07 (New Zealand) MF Leo Bertos; 08 (Barbados) FW Paul Ifill (substituted off) 82'; 09 (England) FW Chris Greenacre; 12 (Australia) MF Nick Ward; 17 (Australia) MF Vince Lia; 18 (New Zealand) DF Ben Sigmund; 22 (Australia) DF Andrew Durante (c); Substitutes: 01 (New Zealand) GK Mark Paston; 11 (Brazil) MF Daniel; 15 (New Zealand) DF Cameron Lindsay; 24 (United States) FW Alex Smith (substituted on) 82' | P. Ifill 26'; N. Ward 80' | (1–0); Summary; Report; 7 Shots 11; 5 Shots on Target 5; 17 Fouls Committed 9; 3 Corners 6; 7 Offsides 2; 35% Possession 65% | (yellow card) 7' M. Jurman; (yellow card) 79' M. Nichols | Attendance: 4,628; Referee: (Australia) Gerard Parsons Brisbane Starting XI: 01 (Australia) GK Michael Theoklitos; 03 (Australia) DF Shane Stefanutto; 04 (Australia) DF Matthew Jurman; 05 (Australia) DF Ivan Franjic; 06 (Australia) MF Erik Paartalu; 07 (Albania) FW Besart Berisha; 09 (Australia) FW Kofi Danning (substituted off) 64'; 11 (Canada) MF Issey Nakajima-Farran (substituted off) 76'; 14 (Australia) MF Rocky Visconte (substituted off) 76'; 16 (Bahrain) DF Sayed Mohamed Adnan; 17 (Australia) MF Mitch Nichols; Substitutes: 20 (Australia) GK Andrew Redmayne; 08 (Australia) MF Massimo Murdocca (substituted on) 64'; 19 (Australia) DF Jack Hingert (substituted on) 76'; 24 (Australia) FW Nicholas Fitzgerald (substituted on) 76' |

| 18 December 2011 Round 12 | Melbourne Victory | 3–1 | Wellington Phoenix | AAMI Park, Melbourne |
| 17:00 AEDT; 19:00 NZDT Melbourne Starting XI: 21 (Australia) GK Ante Čović; 02 (Australia) DF Matthew Foschini; 03 (Brazil) DF Fabio; 04 (Australia) DF Petar Franjic; 06 (Australia) MF Leigh Broxham; 10 (Australia) FW Archie Thompson (substituted off) 76'; 13 (Australia) MF Diogo Ferreira; 14 (Australia) MF Billy Celeski; 16 (Costa Rica) MF Carlos Hernández (substituted off) 72'; 22 (Australia) FW Harry Kewell (substituted off) 82'; 23 (Australia) DF Adrian Leijer (c); Substitutes: 20 (Australia) GK Lawrence Thomas; 11 (New Zealand) MF Marco Rojas (substituted on) 76'; 18 (Australia) FW Danny Allsopp (substituted on) 72'; 19 (Australia) MF Isaka Cernak (substituted on) 82' | A. Thompson 3'; H. Kewell (yellow card) 15'; B. Celeski (yellow card) 19' (yellow-red card) 79'; V. Lia 22' (o.g.); D. Ferreira 24'; L. Broxham (yellow card) 28' | (3–0); Summary; Report; 12 Shots 20; 6 Shots on Target 6; 13 Fouls Committed 11; 5 Corners 11; 2 Offsides 2; 49% Possession 51% | 84' A. Smith | Attendance: 14,023; Referee: (Australia) Matthew Gillett Wellington Starting XI: 20 (Trinidad and Tobago) GK Tony Warner; 02 (Malta) MF Manny Muscat; 04 (Australia) DF Brent Griffiths (substituted off) 63'; 06 (New Zealand) MF Tim Brown; 07 (New Zealand) MF Leo Bertos; 09 (England) FW Chris Greenacre (substituted off) 63'; 12 (Australia) MF Nick Ward (substituted off) 66'; 17 (Australia) MF Vince Lia; 18 (New Zealand) DF Ben Sigmund; 22 (Australia) DF Andrew Durante (c); 24 (United States) FW Alex Smith; Substitutes: 01 (New Zealand) GK Mark Paston; 11 (Brazil) MF Daniel (substituted on) 63'; 14 (Australia) FW Mirjan Pavlovic (substituted on) 63'; 21 (Spain) MF Dani Sánchez (substituted on) 66' |

| 23 December 2011 Round 13 | Wellington Phoenix | 5–2 | Newcastle Jets | Westpac Stadium, Wellington |
| 19:30 NZDT; 17:30 AEDT Wellington Starting XI: 20 (Trinidad and Tobago) GK Tony Warner; 02 (Malta) MF Manny Muscat; 06 (New Zealand) MF Tim Brown; 07 (New Zealand) MF Leo Bertos; 09 (England) FW Chris Greenacre; 11 (Brazil) MF Daniel (substituted off) 82'; 17 (Australia) MF Vince Lia; 18 (New Zealand) DF Ben Sigmund; 21 (Spain) MF Dani Sánchez (substituted off) 70'; 22 (Australia) DF Andrew Durante (c); 24 (United States) FW Alex Smith; Substitutes: 01 (New Zealand) GK Mark Paston; 04 (Australia) DF Brent Griffiths; 14 (Australia) FW Mirjan Pavlovic (substituted on) 70'; 19 (Australia) DF Jimmy Downey (substituted on) 82' | D. Sánchez 15', 33'; C. Greenacre 38'; A. Durante (yellow card) 41'; V. Lia (yellow card) 46'; A. Smith (yellow card) 65'; M. Pavlovic 73', 76' | (3–0); Summary; Report; 15 Shots 5; 9 Shots on Target 3; 14 Fouls Committed 10; 4 Corners 2; 4 Offsides 0; 50% Possession 50% | (yellow card) 41' B. Kantarovski; (yellow card) 41' A. Abbas; 50' S. Byun; (yellow card) 79' Tiago; 88' R. Griffiths | Attendance: 6,471; Referee: (Australia) Ben Williams Newcastle Starting XI: 01 (Australia) GK Ben Kennedy; 04 (Australia) DF Nikolai Topor-Stanley (substituted off) 75'; 05 (Brazil) DF Tiago; 06 (Australia) MF Ben Kantarovski; 10 (Australia) MF Ruben Zadkovich; 11 (Australia) DF Tarek Elrich; 13 (South Korea) DF Byun Sung-Hwan; 22 (Iraq) MF Ali Abbas (substituted off) 46'; 23 (Australia) FW Ryan Griffiths (c); 24 (England) FW Francis Jeffers (substituted off) 46'; 25 (Australia) MF Jacob Pepper; Substitutes: 19 (Australia) GK Matthew Nash; 02 (Australia) DF Taylor Regan (substituted on) 75'; 08 (New Zealand) FW Jeremy Brockie (substituted on) 46'; 09 (England) FW Michael Bridges (substituted on) 46' |

| 30 December 2011 Round 14 | Adelaide United | 2–0 | Wellington Phoenix | Hindmarsh Stadium, Adelaide |
| 19:30 ACDT; 22:00 NZDT Adelaide Starting XI: 01 (Australia) GK Eugene Galeković (c); 03 (Australia) DF Nigel Boogaard; 05 (Australia) DF Daniel Mullen; 09 (Netherlands) FW Sergio van Dijk; 10 (Australia) MF Dario Vidošić; 11 (Australia) FW Bruce Djite (substituted off) 83'; 12 (Australia) DF Antony Golec; 14 (Australia) MF Cameron Watson; 16 (Australia) MF Spase Dilevski (substituted off) 42'; 18 (Australia) MF Fabian Barbiero; 21 (Uruguay) MF Francisco Usúcar (substituted off) 61'; Substitutes: 30 (Australia) GK Paul Izzo; 04 (Australia) DF Jon McKain (substituted on) 61'; 02 (Australia) DF Osama Malik (substituted on) 83'; 07 (Australia) MF Zenon Caravella (substituted on) 42' | B. Djite 17'; A. Golec 62'; J. McKain (yellow card) 71'; S. van Dijk (yellow card) 82'; Z. Caravella (yellow card) 85' | (1–0); Summary; Report; 14 Shots 13; 6 Shots on Target 5; 13 Fouls Committed 13; 1 Corners 8; 1 Offsides 2; 54% Possession 46% | (yellow card) 13' T. Brown; (yellow card) 51' M. Muscat; (yellow card) 78' T. Lochhead | Attendance: 9,739; Referee: (Australia) Chris Beath Wellington Starting XI: 20 (Trinidad and Tobago) GK Tony Warner; 02 (Malta) MF Manny Muscat; 03 (New Zealand) DF Tony Lochhead; 06 (New Zealand) MF Tim Brown; 07 (New Zealand) MF Leo Bertos; 09 (England) FW Chris Greenacre (substituted off) 73'; 11 (Brazil) MF Daniel (substituted off) 59'; 17 (Australia) MF Vince Lia; 18 (New Zealand) DF Ben Sigmund; 21 (Spain) MF Dani Sánchez (substituted off) 78'; 22 (Australia) DF Andrew Durante (c); Substitutes: 01 (New Zealand) GK Mark Paston; 12 (Australia) MF Nick Ward (substituted on) 73'; 14 (Australia) FW Mirjan Pavlovic (substituted on) 59'; 19 (Australia) DF Jimmy Downey (substituted on) 78' |

| 4 January 2012 Round 15 | Wellington Phoenix | 4–2 | Sydney FC | Westpac Stadium, Wellington |
| 15:00 NZDT; 13:00 AEDT Wellington Starting XI: 20 (Trinidad and Tobago) GK Tony Warner; 02 (Malta) MF Manny Muscat; 03 (New Zealand) DF Tony Lochhead; 06 (New Zealand) MF Tim Brown; 07 (New Zealand) MF Leo Bertos; 09 (England) FW Chris Greenacre (substituted off) 60'; 11 (Brazil) MF Daniel (substituted off) 70'; 17 (Australia) MF Vince Lia (substituted off) 70'; 18 (New Zealand) DF Ben Sigmund; 21 (Spain) MF Dani Sánchez; 22 (Australia) DF Andrew Durante (c); Substitutes: 01 (New Zealand) GK Mark Paston; 08 (Barbados) FW Paul Ifill (substituted on) 60'; 14 (Australia) FW Mirjan Pavlovic (substituted on) 70'; 24 (United States) FW Alex Smith (substituted on) 70' | V. Lia (yellow card) 15'; Daniel 24' (pen.); D. Sánchez 41'; Ben Sigmund 77'; Paul Ifill 90+4' | (2–1); Summary; Report; 20 Shots 16; 11 Shots on Target 7; 10 Fouls Committed 10; 11 Corners 3; 4 Offsides 0; 51% Possession 49% | 15' (pen.) B. Emerton; (yellow card) 24' J. Coyne; 63' B. Cazarine; (yellow card) 67' T. Antonis | Attendance: 8,411; Referee: (Australia) Alan Milliner Sydney Starting XI: 01 (Australia) GK Liam Reddy; 03 (Australia) DF Jamie Coyne (substituted off) 54'; 04 (Netherlands) DF Pascal Bosschaart; 05 (Australia) DF Michael Beauchamp; 07 (Australia) MF Brett Emerton; 09 (Brazil) FW Bruno Cazarine; 11 (Australia) FW Dimitri Petratos (substituted off) 60'; 12 (Australia) DF Shannon Cole; 15 (Northern Ireland) MF Terry McFlynn (c) (substituted off) 88'; 17 (Australia) MF Terry Antonis; 19 (Australia) FW Mark Bridge; Substitutes: 20 (Australia) GK Ivan Necevski; 02 (Australia) DF Sebastian Ryall (substituted on) 88'; 18 (Finland) FW Juho Makela (substituted on) 60'; 23 (Australia) MF Rhyan Grant (substituted on) 54' |

| 8 January 2012 Round 16 | Wellington Phoenix | 0–1 | Perth Glory | Westpac Stadium, Wellington |
| 16:00 NZDT; 22:00 AWST Wellington Starting XI: 20 (Trinidad and Tobago) GK Tony Warner; 02 (Malta) MF Manny Muscat; 03 (New Zealand) DF Tony Lochhead; 06 (New Zealand) MF Tim Brown; 07 (New Zealand) MF Leo Bertos; 09 (England) FW Chris Greenacre (substituted off) 61'; 11 (Brazil) MF Daniel (substituted off) 61'; 17 (Australia) MF Vince Lia (substituted off) 71'; 18 (New Zealand) DF Ben Sigmund; 21 (Spain) MF Dani Sánchez; 22 (Australia) DF Andrew Durante (c); Substitutes: 01 (New Zealand) GK Mark Paston; 08 (Barbados) FW Paul Ifill (substituted on) 61'; 14 (Australia) FW Mirjan Pavlovic (substituted on) 61'; 24 (United States) FW Alex Smith (substituted on) 71' | T. Lochhead (yellow card) 71'; A. Durante (yellow card) 84' | (0–0); Summary; Report; 4 Shots 10; 1 Shots on Target 6; 13 Fouls Committed 13; 5 Corners 6; 2 Offsides 0; 48% Possession 52% | (yellow card) 82' S. Pantelidis; 90+2' J. Mitchell | Attendance: 3,898; Referee: (Australia) Kris Griffiths-Jones Perth Starting XI: 01 (Australia) GK Danny Vukovic; 02 (Australia) DF Josh Mitchell; 05 (Australia) DF Steve Pantelidis; 07 (Australia) MF Jacob Burns (c) (substituted off) 87'; 09 (New Zealand) FW Shane Smeltz (substituted off) 73'; 10 (Republic of Ireland) MF Liam Miller; 13 (Australia) MF Travis Dodd; 14 (Scotland) MF Steven McGarry; 17 (Australia) MF Todd Howarth; 19 (Australia) DF Joshua Risdon; 21 (Australia) FW Mile Sterjovski; Substitutes: 30 (Australia) GK Lewis Italiano; 08 (Australia) MF Adam Hughes (substituted on) 87'; 16 (Australia) DF Evan Berger; 27 (Brazil) MF Andrezinho (substituted on) 73' |

| 15 January 2012 Round 17 | Gold Coast United | 0–1 | Wellington Phoenix | Skilled Park, Gold Coast |
| 18:30 AEDT; 20:30 NZDT Gold Coast Starting XI: 20 (Australia) GK Jerrad Tyson; 03 (Australia) DF Michael Thwaite; 05 (Australia) DF Kristian Rees (substituted off) 63'; 06 (Netherlands) DF Paul Beekmans (substituted off) 87'; 13 (Australia) DF Ante Rožić; 14 (Australia) MF Ben Halloran; 15 (Ivory Coast) DF Adama Traoré; 16 (Netherlands) FW Maceo Rigters; 18 (Australia) MF James Brown; 22 (Netherlands) MF Peter Jungschläger; 24 (Australia) MF Jonas Salley; Substitutes: 40 (Australia) GK Chris O'Connor; 12 (Australia) FW Dylan Macallister (substituted on) 63' (substituted off) 77'; 21 (Australia) FW Daniel Severino (substituted on) 77'; 29 (Australia) FW Mitch Bevan (substituted on) 87' | K. Rees (yellow card) 23'; M. Thwaite (yellow card) 73' | (0–0); Summary; Report; 16 Shots 12; 9 Shots on Target 5; 17 Fouls Committed 10; 7 Corners 7; 1 Offsides 0; 54% Possession 46% | (yellow card) 57' (goal) 87' T. Brown; (yellow card) 85' P. Ifill | Attendance: 2,135; Referee: (Australia) Kurt Ams Wellington Starting XI: 01 (New Zealand) GK Mark Paston; 02 (Malta) MF Manny Muscat; 03 (New Zealand) DF Tony Lochhead; 06 (New Zealand) MF Tim Brown; 08 (Barbados) FW Paul Ifill; 09 (England) FW Chris Greenacre; 12 (Australia) MF Nick Ward (substituted off) 66'; 18 (New Zealand) DF Ben Sigmund; 21 (Spain) MF Dani Sánchez (substituted off) 51'; 22 (Australia) DF Andrew Durante (c); 24 (United States) FW Alex Smith (substituted off) 82'; Substitutes: 20 (Trinidad and Tobago) GK Tony Warner; 07 (New Zealand) MF Leo Bertos (substituted on) 51'; 11 (Brazil) MF Daniel (substituted on) 82'; 19 (Australia) DF Jimmy Downey (substituted on) 66' |

| 20 January 2012 Round 18 | Newcastle Jets | 0–1 | Wellington Phoenix | Ausgrid Stadium, Newcastle |
| 20:00 AEDT; 22:00 NZDT Newcastle Starting XI: 01 (Australia) GK Ben Kennedy; 02 (Australia) DF Taylor Regan; 04 (Australia) DF Nikolai Topor-Stanley; 06 (Australia) MF Ben Kantarovski; 08 (New Zealand) FW Jeremy Brockie; 09 (England) FW Michael Bridges (substituted off) 75'; 10 (Australia) MF Ruben Zadkovich; 11 (Australia) DF Tarek Elrich (substituted off) 65'; 13 (South Korea) DF Byun Sung-Hwan; 23 (Australia) FW Ryan Griffiths (c); 25 (Australia) MF Jacob Pepper (substituted off) 65'; Substitutes: 19 (Australia) GK Matthew Nash; 12 (Australia) MF Jobe Wheelhouse (substituted on) 65'; 14 (Australia) FW Labinot Haliti (substituted on) 65'; 22 (Iraq) MF Ali Abbas (substituted on) 75' | T. Elrich (yellow card) 48'; J. Wheelhouse (yellow card) 73'; R. Zadkovich (yellow card) 78' | (0–0); Summary; Report; 14 Shots 12; 5 Shots on Target 3; 14 Fouls Committed 6; 5 Corners 3; 4 Offsides 2; 56% Possession 44% | 57' M. Muscat | Attendance: 11,694; Referee: (Australia) Matthew Gillett Wellington Starting XI: 01 (New Zealand) GK Mark Paston; 02 (Malta) MF Manny Muscat; 03 (New Zealand) DF Tony Lochhead; 06 (New Zealand) MF Tim Brown; 08 (Barbados) FW Paul Ifill (substituted off) 89'; 09 (England) FW Chris Greenacre; 12 (Australia) MF Nick Ward (substituted off) 66'; 18 (New Zealand) DF Ben Sigmund; 21 (Spain) MF Dani Sánchez (substituted off) 87'; 22 (Australia) DF Andrew Durante (c); 24 (United States) FW Alex Smith; Substitutes: 20 (Trinidad and Tobago) GK Tony Warner; 07 (New Zealand) MF Leo Bertos (substituted on) 66'; 11 (Brazil) MF Daniel (substituted on) 89'; 19 (Australia) DF Jimmy Downey (substituted on) 87' |

| 29 January 2012 Round 19 | Wellington Phoenix | 3–1 | Melbourne Heart | Westpac Stadium, Wellington |
| 16:30 NZDT; 18:30 AEDT Wellington Starting XI: 01 (New Zealand) GK Mark Paston; 02 (Malta) MF Manny Muscat; 03 (New Zealand) DF Tony Lochhead; 06 (New Zealand) MF Tim Brown; 07 (New Zealand) MF Leo Bertos (substituted off) 78'; 08 (Barbados) FW Paul Ifill; 09 (England) FW Chris Greenacre; 18 (New Zealand) DF Ben Sigmund; 21 (Spain) MF Dani Sánchez (substituted off) 83'; 22 (Australia) DF Andrew Durante (c); 24 (United States) FW Alex Smith; Substitutes: 20 (Trinidad and Tobago) GK Tony Warner; 11 (Brazil) MF Daniel (substituted on) 78'; 17 (Australia) MF Vince Lia; 19 (Australia) DF Jimmy Downey (substituted on) 83' | P. Ifill 3', 64'; L. Bertos (yellow card) 47'; C. Greenacre 54' | (1–1); Summary; Report; 13 Shots 8; 8 Shots on Target 2; 12 Fouls Committed 12; 3 Corners 5; 9 Offsides 1; 47% Possession 53% | 34' A. Terra | Attendance: 13,601; Referee: (Australia) Peter Green Melbourne Starting XI: 01 (Australia) GK Clint Bolton; 02 (Australia) DF Michael Marrone; 03 (Australia) DF Brendan Hamill (substituted off) 66'; 06 (Australia) DF Matt Thompson (substituted off) 55'; 08 (Australia) MF Kristian Sarkies; 11 (Brazil) FW Alex Terra; 13 (Argentina) DF Jonatan Germano; 16 (Australia) DF Aziz Behich; 18 (Australia) DF Curtis Good; 19 (Australia) FW Eli Babalj; 23 (Australia) MF Mate Dugandžić (substituted off) 69'; Substitutes: 30 (Australia) GK Sebastian Mattei; 04 (Australia) DF Simon Colosimo (substituted on) 66'; 07 (Netherlands) MF Rutger Worm (substituted on) 55'; 15 (Australia) FW David Williams (substituted on) 69' |

| 3 February 2012 Round 20 | Adelaide United | 1–2 | Wellington Phoenix | Hindmarsh Stadium, Adelaide |
| 19:30 ACDT; 22:00 NZDT Adelaide Starting XI: 01 (Australia) GK Eugene Galeković (c); 02 (Australia) DF Osama Malik; 03 (Australia) DF Nigel Boogaard; 06 (Brazil) DF Cássio; 08 (Ukraine) MF Yevhen Levchenko; 09 (Netherlands) FW Sergio van Dijk; 10 (Australia) MF Dario Vidošić (substituted off) 75'; 11 (Australia) FW Bruce Djite; 14 (Australia) MF Cameron Watson; 17 (Australia) MF Iain Ramsay (substituted off) 63'; 18 (Australia) MF Fabian Barbiero; Substitutes: 30 (Australia) GK Paul Izzo; 07 (Australia) MF Zenon Caravella (substituted on) 63'; 15 (Australia) MF Jacob Melling (substituted on) 75'; 21 (Uruguay) MF Francisco Usúcar | B. Djite 9'; O. Malik (yellow card) 36' | (1–2); Summary; Report; 15 Shots 10; 5 Shots on Target 6; 7 Fouls Committed 14; 6 Corners 0; 2 Offsides 3; 54% Possession 46% | 13' T. Brown; 38' D. Sánchez; (yellow card) 53' M. Muscat; (yellow card) 76' B. Sigmund; (yellow card) 86' P. Ifill; (yellow card) 90' Daniel | Attendance: 8,425; Referee: (Australia) Gerard Parsons Wellington Starting XI: 01 (New Zealand) GK Mark Paston; 02 (Malta) MF Manny Muscat; 03 (New Zealand) DF Tony Lochhead; 06 (New Zealand) MF Tim Brown; 07 (New Zealand) MF Leo Bertos; 08 (Barbados) FW Paul Ifill; 09 (England) FW Chris Greenacre (substituted off) 70'; 18 (New Zealand) DF Ben Sigmund; 21 (Spain) MF Dani Sánchez (substituted off) 64'; 22 (Australia) DF Andrew Durante (c); 24 (United States) FW Alex Smith; Substitutes: 20 (Trinidad and Tobago) GK Tony Warner; 11 (Brazil) MF Daniel (substituted on) 64'; 17 (Australia) MF Vince Lia (substituted on) 70'; 19 (Australia) DF Jimmy Downey |

| 12 February 2012 Round 21 | Wellington Phoenix | 0–2 | Brisbane Roar | Westpac Stadium, Wellington |
| 17:00 NZDT; 15:00 AEDT Wellington Starting XI: 01 (New Zealand) GK Mark Paston; 03 (New Zealand) DF Tony Lochhead; 06 (New Zealand) MF Tim Brown; 07 (New Zealand) MF Leo Bertos (substituted off) 62'; 08 (Barbados) FW Paul Ifill; 09 (England) FW Chris Greenacre; 17 (Australia) MF Vince Lia; 18 (New Zealand) DF Ben Sigmund (substituted off) 90'; 21 (Spain) MF Dani Sánchez; 22 (Australia) DF Andrew Durante (c); 24 (United States) FW Alex Smith; Substitutes: 20 (Trinidad and Tobago) GK Tony Warner; 11 (Brazil) MF Daniel (substituted on) 62'; 14 (Australia) FW Mirjan Pavlovic (substituted on) 90'; 19 (Australia) DF Jimmy Downey | V. Lia (yellow card) 28'; C. Greenacre (yellow card) 71'; A. Durante (yellow card) 85'; T. Brown (yellow card) 90' | (0–1); Summary; Report; 11 Shots 11; 5 Shots on Target 5; 17 Fouls Committed 9; 4 Corners 3; 3 Offsides 2; 36% Possession 64% | (yellow card) 37' M. Adnan; 42' B. Berisha; (yellow card) 49' S. Stefanutto; (yellow card) 67' M. Smith; 80' M. Nichols | Attendance: 13,009; Referee: (Australia) Jarred Gillett Brisbane Starting XI: 01 (Australia) GK Michael Theoklitos; 02 (Australia) DF Matt Smith (c); 03 (Australia) DF Shane Stefanutto; 05 (Australia) DF Ivan Franjic; 06 (Australia) MF Erik Paartalu; 07 (Albania) FW Besart Berisha; 08 (Australia) MF Massimo Murdocca; 10 (Brazil) FW Henrique (substituted off) 69'; 16 (Bahrain) DF Sayed Mohamed Adnan; 22 (Germany) MF Thomas Broich; 24 (Australia) FW Nicholas Fitzgerald (substituted off) 62'; Substitutes: 20 (Australia) GK Andrew Redmayne; 12 (Australia) DF Matt Mundy; 17 (Australia) MF Mitch Nichols (substituted on) 62'; 21 (Australia) MF James Meyer (substituted on) 69' |

| 18 February 2012 Round 22 | Central Coast Mariners | 2–0 | Wellington Phoenix | Bluetongue Stadium, Central Coast |
| 17:30 AEDT; 19:30 NZDT Central Coast Starting XI: 20 (Australia) GK Justin Pasfield; 03 (Australia) DF Joshua Rose; 04 (Australia) DF Pedj Bojić; 06 (Netherlands) DF Patrick Zwaanswijk; 07 (Malta) MF John Hutchinson; 08 (Australia) MF Rostyn Griffiths; 14 (New Zealand) MF Michael McGlinchey; 17 (Australia) FW Tom Rogić (substituted off) 75'; 18 (Australia) DF Alex Wilkinson (c); 19 (England) FW John Sutton (substituted off) 89'; 23 (Australia) FW Adam Kwasnik (substituted off) 61'; Substitutes: 31 (Australia) GK Brody Crane; 02 (Australia) FW Daniel McBreen (substituted on) 75'; 09 (Australia) FW Bernie Ibini-Isei (substituted on) 81'; 12 (Australia) MF Troy Hearfield (substituted on) 89' | J. Sutton (yellow card) 7'; T. Rogic 52'; A. Kwasnik (yellow card) 56'; P. Zwaanwijk 83' | (0–0); Summary; Report; 20 Shots 7; 11 Shots on Target 5; 8 Fouls Committed 10; 6 Corners 4; 3 Offsides 6; 59% Possession 41% | (yellow card) 87' M. Muscat | Attendance: 7,845; Referee: (Australia) Strebre Delovski Wellington Starting XI: 01 (New Zealand) GK Mark Paston; 02 (Malta) MF Manny Muscat; 03 (New Zealand) DF Tony Lochhead (substituted off) 85'; 04 (Australia) DF Brent Griffiths; 07 (New Zealand) MF Leo Bertos; 08 (Barbados) FW Paul Ifill; 09 (England) FW Chris Greenacre (substituted off) 71'; 17 (Australia) MF Vince Lia; 18 (New Zealand) DF Ben Sigmund (C); 21 (Spain) MF Dani Sánchez (substituted off) 65'; 24 (United States) FW Alex Smith; Substitutes: 20 (Trinidad and Tobago) GK Tony Warner; 11 (Brazil) MF Daniel (substituted on) 65'; 12 (Australia) FW Nick Ward (substituted on) 71'; 19 (Australia) DF Jimmy Downey (substituted on) 85' |

| 25 February 2012 Round 23 | Sydney FC | 0–1 | Wellington Phoenix | Sydney Football Stadium, Sydney |
| 17:30 AEDT; 19:30 NZDT Sydney Starting XI: 20 (Australia) GK Ivan Necevski; 04 (Netherlands) DF Pascal Bosschaart; 05 (Australia) DF Michael Beauchamp; 06 (Japan) MF Hirofumi Moriyasu (substituted off) 67'; 07 (Australia) MF Brett Emerton; 09 (Brazil) FW Bruno Cazarine; 10 (Australia) MF Nick Carle; 15 (Northern Ireland) MF Terry McFlynn (c); 16 (Australia) MF Joel Chianese (substituted off) 75'; 21 (Australia) DF Scott Jamieson (substituted off) 90'; 23 (Australia) MF Rhyan Grant; Substitutes: 01 (Australia) GK Liam Reddy; 17 (Australia) MF Terry Antonis (substituted on) 67'; 22 (Australia) DF Nathan Sherlock (substituted on) 90'; 24 (Australia) FW Mitchell Mallia (substituted on) 75' | J. Chianese (yellow card) 23'; M. Beauchamp (yellow card) 63' | (0–1); Summary; Report; 24 Shots 8; 6 Shots on Target 4; 7 Fouls Committed 15; 7 Corners 2; 3 Offsides 2; 55% Possession 45% | 13' P. Ifill; (yellow card) 68' V. Lia | Attendance: 10,165; Referee: (Australia) Peter Green Wellington Starting XI: 01 (New Zealand) GK Mark Paston; 02 (Malta) MF Manny Muscat; 03 (New Zealand) DF Tony Lochhead; 06 (New Zealand) MF Tim Brown; 07 (New Zealand) MF Leo Bertos (substituted off) 77'; 08 (Barbados) FW Paul Ifill; 09 (England) FW Chris Greenacre (substituted off) 82'; 17 (Australia) MF Vince Lia; 18 (New Zealand) DF Ben Sigmund; 21 (Spain) MF Dani Sánchez (substituted off) 68'; 22 (Australia) DF Andrew Durante (c); Substitutes: 20 (Trinidad and Tobago) GK Tony Warner; 12 (Australia) FW Nick Ward (substituted on) 68'; 14 (Australia) FW Mirjan Pavlovic (substituted on) 82'; 24 (United States) FW Alex Smith (substituted on) 77' |

| 4 March 2012 Round 24 | Wellington Phoenix | 2–0 | Gold Coast United | Westpac Stadium, Wellington |
| 16:30 NZDT; 19:30 AEST Wellington Starting XI: 01 (New Zealand) GK Mark Paston; 02 (Malta) MF Manny Muscat; 06 (New Zealand) MF Tim Brown; 07 (New Zealand) MF Leo Bertos; 08 (Barbados) FW Paul Ifill; 09 (England) FW Chris Greenacre; 17 (Australia) MF Vince Lia; 18 (New Zealand) DF Ben Sigmund; 21 (Spain) MF Dani Sánchez (substituted off) 66'; 22 (Australia) DF Andrew Durante (c); 24 (United States) FW Alex Smith (substituted off) 70'; Substitutes: 20 (Trinidad and Tobago) GK Tony Warner; 12 (Australia) FW Nick Ward (substituted on) 70'; 13 (Australia) DF Nikolas Tsattalios; 14 (Australia) FW Mirjan Pavlovic (substituted on) 66' | A. Durante 29'; A. Smith (yellow card) 37'; N. Ward 90+2' | (1–0); Summary; Report; 21 Shots 8; 14 Shots on Target 3; 12 Fouls Committed 7; 15 Corners 4; 3 Offsides 1; 47% Possession 53% | | Attendance: 7,431; Referee: (Australia) Kris Griffiths-Jones Gold Coast Starting XI: 20 (Australia) GK Jerrad Tyson; 02 (Australia) MF Joshua Brillante (substituted off) 70'; 03 (Australia) DF Michael Thwaite; 04 (Australia) DF Zachary Anderson; 07 (Australia) FW Gol-Gol Mebrahtu (substituted off) 72'; 15 (Ivory Coast) DF Adama Traoré; 16 (Netherlands) FW Maceo Rigters; 17 (Australia) FW Chris Harold; 23 (Australia) DF Dylan McGowan; 28 (Australia) DF Daniel Bowles; 33 (Australia) MF Mitch Cooper (substituted off) 65'; Substitutes: 40 (Australia) GK Chris O'Connor; 11 (Australia) MF Jake Barker-Daish (substituted on) 65'; 22 (Netherlands) MF Peter Jungschläger (substituted on) 70'; 31 (Australia) DF Daniel Bragg (substituted on) 72' |

| 10 March 2012 Round 25 | Melbourne Heart | 1–1 | Wellington Phoenix | AAMI Park, Melbourne |
| 17:30 AEDT; 19:30 NZDT Melbourne Starting XI: 01 (Australia) GK Clint Bolton; 02 (Australia) DF Michael Marrone; 04 (Australia) DF Simon Colosimo; 05 (Brazil) MF Fred (c) (substituted off) 88'; 06 (Australia) DF Matt Thompson (substituted off) 61'; 10 (Australia) MF Wayne Srhoj; 13 (Argentina) DF Jonatan Germano (substituted off) 81'; 16 (Australia) DF Aziz Behich; 18 (Australia) DF Curtis Good; 19 (Australia) FW Eli Babalj; 23 (Australia) MF Mate Dugandžić; Substitutes: 30 (Australia) GK Sebastian Mattei; 03 (Australia) DF Brendan Hamill (substituted on) 88'; 11 (Brazil) FW Alex Terra (substituted on) 81'; 27 (Australia) MF Craig Goodwin (substituted on) 61' | E .Babalj 32'; M. Dugandzic (yellow card) 41' | (1–0); Summary; Report; 11 Shots 9; 7 Shots on Target 4; 18 Fouls Committed 23; 6 Corners 4; 1 Offsides 3; 52% Possession 48% | (yellow card) 40' A. Durante; (yellow card) 41' B. Sigmund; (yellow card) 43' M. Muscat; 80' P. Ifill | Attendance: 6,759; Referee: (Australia) Peter Green Wellington Starting XI: 01 (New Zealand) GK Mark Paston; 02 (Malta) MF Manny Muscat; 03 (New Zealand) DF Tony Lochhead (substituted off) 62'; 06 (New Zealand) MF Tim Brown; 08 (Barbados) FW Paul Ifill; 09 (England) FW Chris Greenacre; 12 (Australia) FW Nick Ward (substituted off) 71'; 17 (Australia) MF Vince Lia; 18 (New Zealand) DF Ben Sigmund; 21 (Spain) MF Dani Sánchez (substituted off) 85'; 22 (Australia) DF Andrew Durante (c); Substitutes: 20 (Trinidad and Tobago) GK Tony Warner; 13 (Australia) DF Nikolas Tsattalios (substituted on) 71'; 14 (Australia) FW Mirjan Pavlovic (substituted on) 62'; 24 (United States) FW Alex Smith (substituted on) 85' |

| 16 March 2012 Round 26 | Melbourne Victory | 3–0 | Wellington Phoenix | AAMI Park, Melbourne |
| 20:00 AEDT; 22:00 NZDT Melbourne Starting XI: 01 (Australia) GK Tando Velaphi; 02 (Australia) DF Matthew Foschini; 03 (Brazil) DF Fabio; 05 (Australia) DF Mark Milligan; 10 (Australia) FW Archie Thompson; 11 (New Zealand) MF Marco Rojas (substituted off) 19'; 13 (Australia) MF Diogo Ferreira; 16 (Costa Rica) MF Carlos Hernández (substituted off) 90'; 17 (Australia) MF James Jeggo; 22 (Australia) FW Harry Kewell (substituted off) 80'; 28 (Spain) DF Ubay Luzardo; Substitutes: 21 (Australia) GK Ante Čović; 04 (Australia) DF Petar Franjic (substituted on) 90'; 19 (Australia) MF Isaka Cernak (substituted on) 19'; 29 (Australia) FW Julius Davies (substituted on) 80' | C. Hernández 11'; I. Cernak 58'; J. Jeggo 89'; D. Ferreira (yellow card) 90' | (1–0); Summary; Report; 12 Shots 9; 9 Shots on Target 5; 8 Fouls Committed 14; 3 Corners 3; 2 Offsides 3; 48% Possession 52% | (yellow card) 24' V. Lia; (yellow card) 40' T. Lochhead; (yellow card) 90' P. Ifill | Attendance: 11,231; Referee: (Australia) Chris Beath Wellington Starting XI: 01 (New Zealand) GK Mark Paston; 02 (Malta) MF Manny Muscat; 03 (New Zealand) DF Tony Lochhead; 06 (New Zealand) MF Tim Brown; 08 (Barbados) FW Paul Ifill; 09 (England) FW Chris Greenacre (substituted off) 64'; 17 (Australia) MF Vince Lia; 18 (New Zealand) DF Ben Sigmund; 21 (Spain) MF Dani Sánchez (substituted off) 70'; 22 (Australia) DF Andrew Durante (c); 24 (United States) FW Alex Smith (substituted off) 65'; Substitutes: 20 (Trinidad and Tobago) GK Tony Warner; 07 (New Zealand) MF Leo Bertos (substituted on) 65'; 12 (Australia) FW Nick Ward (substituted on) 70'; 14 (Australia) FW Mirjan Pavlovic (substituted on) 64' |

| 25 March 2012 Round 27 | Wellington Phoenix | 1–2 | Central Coast Mariners | Westpac Stadium, Wellington |
| 16:00 NZDT; 14:00 AEDT Wellington Starting XI: 01 (New Zealand) GK Mark Paston; 02 (Malta) MF Manny Muscat; 03 (New Zealand) DF Tony Lochhead (substituted off) 74'; 06 (New Zealand) MF Tim Brown; 07 (New Zealand) MF Leo Bertos; 08 (Barbados) FW Paul Ifill; 09 (England) FW Chris Greenacre (substituted off) 55'; 17 (Australia) MF Vince Lia; 18 (New Zealand) DF Ben Sigmund; 21 (Spain) MF Dani Sánchez (substituted off) 61'; 22 (Australia) DF Andrew Durante (c); Substitutes: 20 (Trinidad and Tobago) GK Tony Warner; 12 (Australia) FW Nick Ward (substituted on) 61'; 14 (Australia) FW Mirjan Pavlovic (substituted on) 55'; 24 (United States) FW Alex Smith (substituted on) 74' | T. Brown (yellow card) 56'; L. Bertos 80' | (0–1); Summary; Report; 15 Shots 13; 7 Shots on Target 8; 14 Fouls Committed 8; 2 Corners 3; 1 Offsides 2; 57% Possession 43% | 45' J. Sutton; 51' B. Ibini-Isei | Attendance: 9,740; Referee: (Australia) Strebre Delovski Central Coast Starting XI: 01 (Australia) GK Matthew Ryan; 03 (Australia) DF Joshua Rose; 04 (Australia) DF Pedj Bojić; 06 (Netherlands) DF Patrick Zwaanswijk; 07 (Malta) MF John Hutchinson; 09 (Australia) FW Bernie Ibini-Isei (substituted off) 83'; 11 (Australia) MF Oliver Bozanic; 14 (New Zealand) MF Michael McGlinchey; 17 (Australia) FW Tom Rogić (substituted off) 62'; 18 (Australia) DF Alex Wilkinson (c); 19 (England) FW John Sutton (substituted off) 73'; Substitutes: 20 (Australia) GK Justin Pasfield; 12 (Australia) MF Troy Hearfield (substituted on) 83'; 22 (Australia) MF Mustafa Amini (substituted on) 62'; 23 (Australia) FW Adam Kwasnik (substituted on) 73' |

=== 2011–12 finals series ===
| 30 March 2012 Semi-final 4 v 5 | Wellington Phoenix | 3–2 | Sydney FC | Westpac Stadium, Wellington |
| 20:00 NZDT; 18:00 AEDT Wellington Starting XI: 01 (New Zealand) GK Mark Paston; 02 (Malta) MF Manny Muscat; 03 (New Zealand) DF Tony Lochhead (substituted off) 62'; 06 (New Zealand) MF Tim Brown; 07 (New Zealand) MF Leo Bertos (substituted off) 89'; 08 (Barbados) FW Paul Ifill; 09 (England) FW Chris Greenacre; 17 (Australia) MF Vince Lia; 18 (New Zealand) DF Ben Sigmund; 21 (Spain) MF Dani Sánchez (substituted off) 77'; 22 (Australia) DF Andrew Durante (c); Substitutes: 20 (Trinidad and Tobago) GK Tony Warner; 11 (Brazil) MF Daniel (substituted on) 89'; 12 (Australia) FW Nick Ward; 14 (Australia) FW Mirjan Pavlovic; 24 (United States) FW Alex Smith (substituted on) 77' | T. Brown (yellow card) 28' (goal) 47'; D. Sánchez (yellow card) 31'; B. Sigmund 78'; P. Ifill 86' (pen.); V. Lia (yellow card) 89' | (0–0); Summary; Report; 13 Shots 6; 9 Shots on Target 5; 16 Fouls Committed 16; 5 Corners 6; 2 Offsides 2; 43% Possession 57% | (yellow card) 27' S. Jamieson; (yellow card) 44' B. Cazarine; 79', 83' J. Chianese; (yellow card) 84' M. Beauchamp | Attendance: 10,019; Referee: (Australia) Chris Beath Sydney Starting XI: 20 (Australia) GK Ivan Necevski; 04 (Netherlands) DF Pascal Bosschaart (substituted off) 51'; 05 (Australia) DF Michael Beauchamp; 07 (Australia) MF Brett Emerton; 08 (Slovakia) MF Karol Kisel; 09 (Brazil) FW Bruno Cazarine (substituted off) 59'; 10 (Australia) MF Nick Carle; 12 (Australia) DF Shannon Cole; 15 (Northern Ireland) MF Terry McFlynn (c) (substituted off) 81'; 16 (Australia) MF Joel Chianese; 21 (Australia) DF Scott Jamieson; Substitutes: 30 (Australia) GK Ryan Norval; 02 (Australia) DF Sebastian Ryall (substituted on) 51'; 17 (Australia) MF Terry Antonis (substituted on) 81'; 19 (Australia) FW Mark Bridge (substituted on) 59'; 24 (Australia) FW Mitchell Mallia |

| 7 April 2012 Minor semi-final | Perth Glory | 3 – 2 (a.e.t.) | Wellington Phoenix | nib Stadium, Perth |
| 17:30 AWST; 21:30 NZST Perth Starting XI: 01 (Australia) GK Danny Vukovic; 03 (Netherlands) DF Bas van den Brink; 04 (Republic of Ireland) FW Billy Mehmet (substituted off) 109'; 05 (Australia) DF Steve Pantelidis; 07 (Australia) MF Jacob Burns (c); 09 (New Zealand) FW Shane Smeltz; 10 (Republic of Ireland) MF Liam Miller; 13 (Australia) MF Travis Dodd (substituted off) 70'; 19 (Australia) DF Joshua Risdon; 27 (Brazil) MF Andrezinho (substituted off) 80'; 35 (Australia) DF Dean Heffernan; Substitutes: 20 (Australia) GK Neil Young; 02 (Australia) DF Josh Mitchell; 12 (Australia) DF Scott Neville (substituted on) 109'; 14 (Scotland) MF Steven McGarry (substituted on) 70'; 17 (Australia) MF Todd Howarth (substituted on) 80' | B. van den Brink 12'; Jacob Burns (yellow card) 52'; B. Mehmet 71'; T. Howarth 111' (yellow card) 112' | (1–0); Summary; Report; 23 Shots 7; 12 Shots on Target 3; 14 Fouls Committed 18; 5 Corners 4; 4 Offsides 1; 52% Possession 48% | (yellow card) 28' M. Muscat; (yellow card) 41' T. Brown; 46' C. Greenacre; 54' M. Muscat; (yellow card) 60' L. Bertos | Attendance: 13,695; Referee: (Australia) Peter Green Wellington Starting XI: 01 (New Zealand) GK Mark Paston; 02 (Malta) MF Manny Muscat; 03 (New Zealand) DF Tony Lochhead; 06 (New Zealand) MF Tim Brown; 07 (New Zealand) MF Leo Bertos (substituted off) 89'; 08 (Barbados) FW Paul Ifill; 09 (England) FW Chris Greenacre (substituted off) 113'; 17 (Australia) MF Vince Lia; 18 (New Zealand) DF Ben Sigmund (substituted off) 62'; 21 (Spain) MF Dani Sánchez (substituted off) 74'; 22 (Australia) DF Andrew Durante (c); Substitutes: 20 (Trinidad and Tobago) GK Tony Warner; 11 (Brazil) MF Daniel (substituted on) 74'; 12 (Australia) FW Nick Ward; 14 (Australia) FW Mirjan Pavlovic (substituted on) 113'; 24 (United States) FW Alex Smith (substituted on) 62' |

=== Results by round ===
| Round | 1 | 2 | 3 | 4 | 5 | 6 | 7 | 8 | 9 | 10 | 11 | 12 | 13 | 14 | 15 | 16 | 17 | 18 | 19 | 20 | 21 | 22 | 23 | 24 | 25 | 26 | 27 |
|---|---|---|---|---|---|---|---|---|---|---|---|---|---|---|---|---|---|---|---|---|---|---|---|---|---|---|---|
| Ground | A | H | A | H | H | A | H | H | A | H | H | A | H | A | H | H | A | A | H | A | H | A | A | H | A | A | H |
| Result | D | W | L | L | L | D | D | W | L | W | W | L | W | L | W | L | W | W | W | W | L | L | W | W | D | L | L |
| Position | 6 | 3 | 4 | 7 | 8 | 9 | 9 | 8 | 8 | 7 | 4 | 6 | 5 | 5 | 4 | 4 | 4 | 3 | 2 | 2 | 3 | 4 | 3 | 3 | 4 | 4 | 4 |

Source: Matches
A = Away; H = Home; W = Win; D = Draw; L = Loss

| Pos | Team | Pld | W | D | L | GF | GA | GD | Pts | Qualification |
|---|---|---|---|---|---|---|---|---|---|---|
| 1 | Central Coast Mariners | 27 | 15 | 6 | 6 | 40 | 24 | +16 | 51 | Qualification for 2013 AFC Champions League group stage and finals series (Note: First place qualifies for the 2013 AFC Champions League group stage. Winning the 2012 A-League Grand Final automatically earns qualification for the 2013 AFC Champions League qualifying play-off, unless first place are champions.) |
| 2 | Brisbane Roar (C) | 27 | 14 | 7 | 6 | 50 | 28 | +22 | 49 | Qualification for 2013 AFC Champions League qualifying play-off and finals series |
| 3 | Perth Glory | 27 | 13 | 4 | 10 | 40 | 35 | +5 | 43 | Qualification for Finals series |
| 4 | Wellington Phoenix | 27 | 12 | 4 | 11 | 34 | 32 | +2 | 40 | Qualification for Finals series |
| 5 | Sydney FC | 27 | 10 | 8 | 9 | 37 | 42 | −5 | 38 | Qualification for Finals series |
| 6 | Melbourne Heart | 27 | 9 | 10 | 8 | 35 | 34 | +1 | 37 | Qualification for Finals series |
| 7 | Newcastle Jets | 27 | 10 | 5 | 12 | 38 | 41 | −3 | 35 | |
| 8 | Melbourne Victory | 27 | 6 | 11 | 10 | 35 | 43 | −8 | 29 | |
| 9 | Adelaide United | 27 | 5 | 10 | 12 | 26 | 44 | −18 | 25 | |
| 10 | Gold Coast United | 27 | 4 | 9 | 14 | 30 | 42 | −12 | 21 | |

Source: ultimatealeague.com
Rules for classification: 1) points; 2) goal difference; 3) number of goals scored.
(C) Champions

== Statistics ==
=== Appearances ===
| Rank | Player | Minutes played by round | | | | | | | | | | | | | | | | | | | | | | | | | | | | | Total | | | | |
| Rank | Player | 1 | 2 | 3 | 4 | 5 | 6 | 7 | 8 | 9 | 10 | 11 | 12 | 13 | 14 | 15 | 16 | 17 | 18 | 19 | 20 | 21 | 22 | 23 | 24 | 25 | 26 | 27 | F1 | F2 | App. | GS | Substituted on | Substituted off | Min. |
|---|---|---|---|---|---|---|---|---|---|---|---|---|---|---|---|---|---|---|---|---|---|---|---|---|---|---|---|---|---|---|---|---|---|---|---|
| 1 | (England) Chris Greenacre | 90 | 90 | 90 | 90 | 90 | 90 | 90 | 90 | (substituted off) 65 | (substituted off) 83 | 90 | (substituted off) 63 | 90 | (substituted off) 73 | (substituted off) 60 | (substituted off) 61 | 90 | 90 | 90 | (substituted off) 70 | 90 | (substituted off) 71 | (substituted off) 82 | 90 | 90 | (substituted off) 64 | (substituted off) 55 | 90 | (substituted off) 113 | 29 | 29 | 0 | 12 | 2,380 |
| 2 | (Australia) Andrew Durante | 90 | 90 | 90 | 90 | 90 | 90 | 90 | 90 | 90 | 90 | 90 | 90 | 90 | 90 | 90 | 90 | 90 | 90 | 90 | 90 | 90 | | 90 | 90 | 90 | 90 | 90 | 90 | 120 | 28 | 28 | 0 | 0 | 2,550 |
| 2 | (New Zealand) Ben Sigmund | 90 | 90 | 90 | 66 | | (substituted off) 84 | 90 | 90 | 90 | 90 | 90 | 90 | 90 | 90 | 90 | 90 | 90 | 90 | 90 | 90 | (substituted off) 89 | 90 | 90 | 90 | 90 | 90 | 90 | 90 | (substituted off) 62 | 28 | 28 | 0 | 3 | 2,461 |
| 2 | (New Zealand) Leo Bertos | 90 | 90 | 90 | 90 | (substituted off) 65 | 90 | 90 | 90 | 90 | 90 | 90 | 90 | 90 | 90 | 90 | 90 | (substituted on) 39 | (substituted on) 24 | (substituted off) 78 | 90 | (substituted off) 62 | 90 | (substituted off) 77 | 90 | | (substituted on) 25 | 90 | (substituted off) 89 | 120 | 28 | 25 | 3 | 5 | 2,289 |
| 5 | (New Zealand) Tim Brown | 90 | 90 | | 90 | 90 | 90 | 90 | 90 | 90 | 90 | 90 | 90 | 90 | 90 | 90 | 90 | 90 | 90 | 90 | 90 | 90 | | 90 | 90 | 90 | 90 | 90 | 90 | 120 | 27 | 27 | 0 | 0 | 2,460 |
| 5 | (Malta) Manny Muscat | 90 | 90 | 90 | | 90 | 90 | 90 | 90 | 90 | 90 | 90 | 90 | 90 | 90 | 90 | 90 | 90 | 90 | 90 | 90 | | 90 | 90 | 90 | 90 | 90 | 90 | 90 | 120 | 27 | 27 | 0 | 0 | 2,460 |
| 7 | (Spain) Dani Sánchez | (substituted off) 68 | (substituted off) 84 | 90 | 90 | 90 | | | | (substituted on) 25 | (substituted off) 76 | | (substituted on) 24 | (substituted off) 70 | (substituted off) 78 | 90 | 90 | (substituted off) 51 | (substituted off) 87 | (substituted off) 83 | (substituted off) 64 | 90 | (substituted off) 65 | (substituted off) 68 | (substituted off) 67 | (substituted off) 85 | (substituted off) 71 | (substituted off) 61 | (substituted off) 77 | (substituted off) 74 | 25 | 23 | 2 | 17 | 1,739 |
| 7 | (New Zealand) Tony Lochhead | 90 | 90 | 90 | 90 | 90 | 90 | 90 | 90 | 90 | (substituted off) 89 | | | | 90 | 90 | 90 | 90 | 90 | 90 | 90 | 90 | (substituted off) 85 | 90 | | (substituted off) 62 | 90 | (substituted off) 74 | 90 | 120 | 25 | 25 | 0 | 4 | 2,230 |
| 9 | (United States) Alex Smith | | (substituted on) 6 | 90 | (substituted off) 68 | 90 | 90 | (substituted off) 58 | | | | (substituted on) 8 | 90 | 90 | | (substituted on) 20 | (substituted on) 19 | (substituted off) 82 | 90 | 90 | 90 | 90 | 90 | (substituted on) 13 | (substituted off) 71 | (substituted on) 5 | (substituted off) 65 | (substituted on) 16 | (substituted on) 13 | (substituted on) 58 | 24 | 15 | 9 | 5 | 1,473 |
| 10 | (Barbados) Paul Ifill | (substituted off) 52 | (substituted off) 14 | | | | | (substituted on) 32 | (substituted off) 60 | 90 | 90 | (substituted off) 82 | | | | (substituted on) 30 | (substituted on) 29 | 90 | (substituted off) 89 | 90 | 90 | 90 | 90 | 90 | 90 | 90 | 90 | 90 | 90 | 120 | 22 | 19 | 3 | 5 | 1,678 |
| 11 | (Australia) Vince Lia | (substituted off) 49 | | | | | | (substituted off) 88 | 90 | 90 | 90 | 90 | 90 | 90 | 90 | (substituted off) 70 | (substituted off) 71 | | | | (substituted on) 20 | 90 | 90 | 90 | 90 | 90 | 90 | 90 | 90 | 120 | 21 | 20 | 1 | 4 | 1,768 |
| 11 | (Australia) Nick Ward | (substituted on) 41 | 82 | 90 | (substituted on) 13 | (substituted on) 25 | 90 | (substituted off) 72 | 90 | (substituted off) 59 | (substituted on) 7 | 90 | (substituted off) 66 | | (substituted on) 17 | | | (substituted off) 66 | (substituted off) 66 | | | | (substituted on) 29 | (substituted on) 22 | (substituted on) 19 | (substituted off) 71 | (substituted on) 19 | (substituted on) 29 | | | 21 | 11 | 10 | 6 | 1,063 |
| 11 | (Brazil) Daniel | (substituted on) 38 | (substituted on) 76 | (substituted off) 75 | (substituted off) 77 | (substituted off) 81 | (substituted off) 73 | (substituted on) 18 | | | (substituted on) 1 | | (substituted on) 27 | (substituted off) 82 | (substituted off) 59 | (substituted off) 70 | (substituted off) 61 | (substituted on) 8 | (substituted on) 1 | (substituted on) 12 | (substituted on) 26 | (substituted on) 28 | (substituted on) 25 | | | | | | (substituted on) 1 | (substituted on) 46 | 21 | 8 | 13 | 8 | 875 |
| 14 | (Trinidad and Tobago) Tony Warner | | 90 | 90 | 90 | 90 | 90 | 90 | 90 | 90 | 90 | 90 | 90 | 90 | 90 | 90 | 90 | | | | | | | | | | | | | | 15 | 15 | 0 | 0 | 1,350 |
| 15 | (Australia) Mirjan Pavlovic | | | | | | | | (substituted on) 30 | (substituted on) 31 | (substituted on) 14 | | (substituted on) 27 | (substituted on) 20 | (substituted on) 31 | (substituted on) 20 | (substituted on) 29 | | | | | (substituted on) 1 | | (substituted on) 8 | (substituted on) 23 | (substituted on) 28 | (substituted on) 26 | (substituted on) 35 | | (substituted on) 7 | 15 | 0 | 15 | 0 | 330 |
| 16 | (New Zealand) Mark Paston | 90 | | | | | | | | | | | | | | | | 90 | 90 | 90 | 90 | 90 | 90 | 90 | 90 | 90 | 90 | 90 | 90 | 120 | 14 | 14 | 0 | 0 | 1,290 |
| 17 | (Australia) Brent Griffiths | | | | (substituted on) 22 | 90 | (substituted on) 6 | (substituted on) 2 | | | | 90 | (substituted off) 63 | | | | | | | | | | 90 | | | | | | | | 7 | 4 | 3 | 1 | 363 |
| 17 | (Australia) Jimmy Downey | (substituted on) 22 | | | | | | | | | | | | (substituted on) 8 | (substituted on) 12 | | | (substituted on) 24 | (substituted on) 3 | (substituted on) 7 | | | (substituted on) 5 | | | | | | | | 7 | 0 | 7 | 0 | 81 |
| 19 | (Australia) Nikolas Tsattalios | | | (substituted on) 15 | 90 | (substituted on) 9 | (substituted on) 17 | | | | | | | | | | | | | | | | | | | (substituted on) 19 | | | | | 5 | 1 | 4 | 0 | 150 |
| 20 | (New Zealand) Cameron Lindsay | | | | | | | | | | | | | | | | | | | | | | | | | | | | | | 0 | 0 | 0 | 0 | 0 |
| 20 | (Australia) Lucas Pantelis | | | | | | | | | | | | | | | | | | | | | | | | | | | | | | 0 | 0 | 0 | 0 | 0 |

Player started Player subbed in Player suspended Player injured

=== Goal scorers ===
| Rank | Player | Goals by round | | | | | | | | | | | | | | | | | | | | | | | | | | | | | Total |
| Rank | Player | 1 | 2 | 3 | 4 | 5 | 6 | 7 | 8 | 9 | 10 | 11 | 12 | 13 | 14 | 15 | 16 | 17 | 18 | 19 | 20 | 21 | 22 | 23 | 24 | 25 | 26 | 27 | F1 | F2 | Total |
|---|---|---|---|---|---|---|---|---|---|---|---|---|---|---|---|---|---|---|---|---|---|---|---|---|---|---|---|---|---|---|---|
| 1 | (Barbados) Paul Ifill | | | | | | | | 1 | | | 1 | | | | 1 | | | | 2 | | | | 1 | | 1 | | | 1 | | 8 |
| 2 | (New Zealand) Tim Brown | | 1 | | | | 1 | | 1 | | | | | | | | | 1 | | | 1 | | | | | | | | 1 | | 6 |
| 3 | (England) Chris Greenacre | 1 | | | | 1 | | | | | | | | 1 | | | | | | 1 | | | | | | | | | | 1 | 5 |
| 3 | (Spain) Dani Sánchez | | | | 1 | | | | | | | | | 2 | | 1 | | | | | 1 | | | | | | | | | | 5 |
| 5 | (New Zealand) Ben Sigmund | | | | | | | | | | 1 | | | | | 1 | | | | | | | | | | | | | 1 | | 3 |
| 6 | (Brazil) Daniel | | 1 | | | | | | | | | | | | | 1 | | | | | | | | | | | | | | | 2 |
| 6 | (Malta) Manny Muscat | | | | | | | | | | | | | | | | | | 1 | | | | | | | | | | | 1 | 2 |
| 6 | (Australia) Mirjan Pavlovic | | | | | | | | | | | | | 2 | | | | | | | | | | | | | | | | | 2 |
| 6 | (Australia) Nick Ward | | | | | | | | | | | 1 | | | | | | | | | | | | | 1 | | | | | | 2 |
| 10 | (New Zealand) Leo Bertos | | | | | | | | | | | | | | | | | | | | | | | | | | | 1 | | | 1 |
| 10 | (Australia) Andrew Durante | | | | | | | | | | | | | | | | | | | | | | | | 1 | | | | | | 1 |
| 10 | (United States) Alex Smith | | | | | | | | | | | | 1 | | | | | | | | | | | | | | | | | | 1 |
| 10 | Own Goal | | | | | | | 1 | | | | | | | | | | | | | | | | | | | | | | | 1 |

Goal scored from penalty kick

=== Goal assists ===
| Rank | Player | Assists by round | | | | | | | | | | | | | | | | | | | | | | | | | | | | | Total |
| Rank | Player | 1 | 2 | 3 | 4 | 5 | 6 | 7 | 8 | 9 | 10 | 11 | 12 | 13 | 14 | 15 | 16 | 17 | 18 | 19 | 20 | 21 | 22 | 23 | 24 | 25 | 26 | 27 | F1 | F2 | Total |
|---|---|---|---|---|---|---|---|---|---|---|---|---|---|---|---|---|---|---|---|---|---|---|---|---|---|---|---|---|---|---|---|
| 1 | (New Zealand) Leo Bertos | | | | | | | | | | 1 | | | 1 | | 2 | | | | 1 | | | | | | | | | 1 | | 6 |
| 2 | (Brazil) Daniel | | | | | | | | | | | | | 3 | | 1 | | 1 | | | | | | | | | | | | | 5 |
| 3 | (Barbados) Paul Ifill | | | | | | | 1 | | | | 1 | | | | | | | 1 | | 1 | | | | | | | | | | 4 |
| 3 | (New Zealand) Tony Lochhead | | 1 | | | | | | 1 | | | | | | | | | | | 1 | | | | 1 | | | | | | | 4 |
| 5 | (Malta) Manny Muscat | 1 | | | | | | | | | | | | 1 | | | | | | 1 | | | | | | | | | | | 3 |
| 5 | (Australia) Nick Ward | | 1 | | | | 1 | | | | | 1 | | | | | | | | | | | | | | | | | | | 3 |
| 7 | (England) Chris Greenacre | | | | | | | | | | | | | | | | | | | | 1 | | | | | 1 | | | | | 2 |
| 7 | (Australia) Vince Lia | | | | | | | | | | | | 1 | | | | | | | | | | | | | | | 1 | | | 2 |
| 7 | (Spain) Dani Sánchez | | | | | 1 | | | | | | | | | | | | | | | | | | | | | | | | 1 | 2 |
| 7 | (New Zealand) Ben Sigmund | | | | | | | | | | | | | | | | | | | | | | | | 1 | | | | 1 | | 2 |
| 11 | (New Zealand) Tim Brown | | | | | | | | | | | | | | | | | | | | | | | | | | | | | 1 | 1 |
| 11 | (Australia) Brent Griffiths | | | | 1 | | | | | | | | | | | | | | | | | | | | | | | | | | 1 |
| 11 | (Australia) Mirjan Pavlovic | | | | | | | | | | | | | | | | | | | | | | | | 1 | | | | | | 1 |

=== Discipline ===
| Rank | Player | Cards by round | | | | | | | | | | | | | | | | | | | | | | | | | | | | | Total | | |
| Rank | Player | 1 | 2 | 3 | 4 | 5 | 6 | 7 | 8 | 9 | 10 | 11 | 12 | 13 | 14 | 15 | 16 | 17 | 18 | 19 | 20 | 21 | 22 | 23 | 24 | 25 | 26 | 27 | F1 | F2 | Yellow card | Yellow-red card | Red card |
|---|---|---|---|---|---|---|---|---|---|---|---|---|---|---|---|---|---|---|---|---|---|---|---|---|---|---|---|---|---|---|---|---|---|
| 1 | (New Zealand) Tim Brown | | Yellow-red card | | | | | Yellow card | | | Yellow card | | | | Yellow card | | | Yellow card | | | | Yellow card | | | | | | Yellow card | Yellow card | Yellow card | 8 | 1 | |
| 1 | (Malta) Manny Muscat | | Yellow card | Yellow-red card | | | Yellow card | | Yellow card | | | | | | Yellow card | | | | | | Yellow card | | Yellow card | | | Yellow card | | | | Yellow card | 8 | 1 | |
| 3 | (New Zealand) Ben Sigmund | | | Yellow card | Yellow card Red card | | | | | | | | | | | | | | | | Yellow card | | | | | Yellow card | | | | | 4 | | 1 |
| 3 | (Australia) Vince Lia | | | | | | | Yellow card | | | | | | Yellow card | | Yellow card | | | | | | Yellow card | | Yellow card | | | Yellow card | | Yellow card | | 7 | | |
| 5 | (Australia) Andrew Durante | Yellow card | | | | | | | Yellow card | | | | | Yellow card | | | Yellow card | | | | | Yellow card | | | | Yellow card | | | | | 6 | | |
| 6 | (New Zealand) Tony Lochhead | | Yellow card | | | | | | | | Yellow card | | | | Yellow card | | Yellow card | | | | | | | | | | Yellow card | | | | 5 | | |
| 7 | (Barbados) Paul Ifill | | | | | | | | | | Yellow card | | | | | | | Yellow card | | | Yellow card | | | | | | Yellow card | | | | 4 | | |
| 8 | (Australia) Mirjan Pavlovic | | | | | | | | | | Red card | | | | | | | | | | | | | | | | | | | | | | 1 |
| 8 | (England) Chris Greenacre | | | | | | | Yellow card | | | | | | | | | | | | | | Yellow card | | | | | Yellow card | | | | 3 | | |
| 8 | (United States) Alex Smith | | | | | | Yellow card | | | | | | | Yellow card | | | | | | | | | | | Yellow card | | | | | | 3 | | |
| 8 | (Australia) Nick Ward | Yellow card | * | | | | Yellow card | | | | | | | | | | | | | | | | | | | | | | | | 3 | | |
| 12 | (New Zealand) Leo Bertos | | | | | | | | | | | | | | | | | | | Yellow card | | | | | | | | | | Yellow card | 2 | | |
| 12 | (Spain) Dani Sánchez | | | | Yellow card | | | | | | | | | | | | | | | | | | | | | | | | Yellow card | | 2 | | |
| 14 | (Brazil) Daniel | | | Yellow card | | | | | | | | | | | | | | | | | Yellow card | | | | | | | | | | 1 | | |

*Nick Ward was originally shown a yellow card, followed by a straight red card, however this decision was appealed, and the red card was subsequently rescinded.

Player suspended

=== Goal times ===
Times in which goals have been scored in the 2011–12 season
| nth Min. | Goals for Wellington Phoenix | Goals against Wellington Phoenix |
|---|---|---|
| 01-05 | 1 | 1 |
| 06-10 | 1 | 0 |
| 11–15 | 2 | 4 |
| 16–20 | 3 | 2 |
| 21–25 | 0 | 2 |
| 26–30 | 3 | 0 |
| 31–35 | 1 | 2 |
| 36–40 | 3 | 1 |
| 41–45 | 1 | 5 |
| 46–50 | 2 | 1 |
| 51–55 | 2 | 3 |
| 56–60 | 2 | 1 |
| 61–65 | 2 | 2 |
| 66–70 | 1 | 1 |
| 71–75 | 2 | 2 |
| 76–80 | 3 | 1 |
| 81–85 | 5 | 4 |
| 86–90 | 5 | 4 |
| In e.t. | 0 | 1 |

=== Home attendance ===
| Date | Round | Attendance | Opposition | Stadium |
|---|---|---|---|---|
| 16 October 2011 | Round 2 | 7,643 | Newcastle Jets | Westpac Stadium |
| 30 October 2011 | Round 4 | 9,369 | Melbourne Victory | Westpac Stadium |
| 4 November 2011 | Round 5 | 5,090 | Central Coast Mariners | Westpac Stadium |
| 19 November 2011 | Round 7 | 20,078 | Adelaide United | Eden Park |
| 27 November 2011 | Round 8 | 6,308 | Sydney FC | Westpac Stadium |
| 10 December 2011 | Round 10 | 6,020 | Perth Glory | Westpac Stadium |
| 14 December 2011 | Round 11 | 4,628 | Brisbane Roar | Forsyth Barr Stadium |
| 23 December 2011 | Round 13 | 6,471 | Newcastle Jets | Westpac Stadium |
| 4 January 2012 | Round 15 | 8,411 | Sydney FC | Westpac Stadium |
| 8 January 2012 | Round 16 | 3,898 | Perth Glory | Westpac Stadium |
| 29 January 2012 | Round 19 | 13,601 | Melbourne Heart | Westpac Stadium |
| 12 February 2012 | Round 21 | 13,009 | Brisbane Roar | Westpac Stadium |
| 4 March 2012 | Round 24 | 7,431 | Gold Coast United | Westpac Stadium |
| 25 March 2012 | Round 27 | 9,740 | Central Coast Mariners | Westpac Stadium |
| 30 March 2012 | Semi-Final 4 v 5 | 10,019 | Sydney FC | Westpac Stadium |
| Total | 131,716 | | | |
| Average | 8,781 | | | |

== Club ==
=== Technical staff ===
- First team coach: (New Zealand) Ricki Herbert
- Forwards coach: (England) Chris Greenacre
- Strength & conditioning coach: Lee Taylor

=== Kit ===
On 29 January 2012, The Wellington Phoenix wore a special black strip in their match against Melbourne Heart. The strip was designed by Andrew Durante, Tim Brown and Leo Bertos to raise money for charity with 100% of the TradeMe auction proceeds going to Cure Kids.

| Home | Away | Special | Goalkeeper #1 |

=== End-of-season awards ===
- Sony Player of the Year: Ben Sigmund
- Members' Player of the Year: Ben Sigmund
- Players' Player of the Year: Ben Sigmund
- Media Player of the Year: Ben Sigmund
- Golden Boot: Paul Ifill – 7 goals
