= Pavelić =

Pavelić (alternatively spelled Pavelic, Pavelich), is a Croatian family name. It is a patronymic surname based on the male given name Pavel, Pavle or Pavao, which is a local variant of Paul. It is closely related to a number of other Slavic surnames with the same etymology such as Pavlović (Pavlovich), Pavletić (Pavletich) or Pavličić (Pavlichich). Historically they come from the area around the Croatian towns of Gospić and Senj. It ranks as the 251st most common family name in Croatia and there is around 2,000 people living in Croatia today with the surname Pavelić, some 450 of them in the capital Zagreb.

== List of persons with the surname ==
- Ante Pavelić (1869–1938), Croatian dentist and politician
- Ante Pavelić (1889–1959), Croatian fascist dictator and war criminal
- Bruno Pavelić (1937–2021), Serbian basketball player
- Ivo Pavelić (1908–2011), Croatian sportsman and businessman
- Krešimir Pavelić (born 1952), Croatian medical scientist
- Mark Pavelich (1958–2021), American ice hockey player
- Marty Pavelich (1922–2024), Canadian retired ice hockey player
- Matt Pavelich (1934–2026), Canadian ice hockey linesman
- Myfanwy Pavelic (1916–2007; née Spencer) Canadian portrait artist

== See also ==
- Pavlich
