= Pavlović =

- Pronunciation: Serbo-Croatian: [pǎːʋloʋitɕ]
- Language: South Slavic

Origin
- Meaning: "son of Pavao/Pavle/Pavlo"
- Region of origin: former Yugoslavia

Other names
- Variant form: Pavlovich
- Related names: Pavelić

Pavlović (Serbo-Croatian) or Pavlovič (in Slovenian and Slovak) is a surname of South Slavic origin stemming from the male given name Pavao, Pavle or Pavel, which are all Slavic variants of Paul. It was formed using the patronymic suffix -ović, meaning son of Pavao/Pavle/Pavel.

Pavlović is the ninth most frequent surname in Serbia. It is among the most frequent surnames in three Croatian counties.

It may refer to:

- Pavlović noble family, served the Kingdom of Bosnia (1391–1463)
- Aleksandar Pavlović (born 1983), Serbian basketball player
- Aleksandar Pavlović (footballer) (born 2004), German football player
- Andrija Pavlović (born 1993), Serbian footballer
- Ante Pavlović, Croatian footballer
- Bernardin Pavlović, Croatian 18th century Franciscan writer
- Bojan Pavlović (footballer born 1986), Serbian football goalkeeper
- Bojan Pavlović (footballer born 1985), Serbian football midfielder
- Branko Pavlović (born 1960), Serbian politician and lawyer
- Daniel Pavlović (born 1988), Bosnian footballer
- Danijel Pavlović (born 1985), Serbian television personality
- Dušan Pavlović (professor) (born 1969), Serbian political economist and politician
- Dušan Pavlović (footballer) (born 1977), Swiss footballer
- Igor Pavlović (footballer born 1982), Serbian footballer
- Igor Pavlović (footballer born 1986), Serbian footballer
- Irena Pavlovic (born 1988), French tennis player
- Katarina Pavlović (born 1995), Croatian handball player
- Koča Pavlović (born 1962), Montenegrin filmmaker and politician
- Ladislav Pavlovič (1926–2013), Slovak footballer
- Lara Pavlović, Croatian handballer
- Laura Pavlovic, Serbian opera singer
- Marko Pavlović (born 1982), Serbian footballer
- Milan Pavlović (footballer) (born 1970), Serbian footballer
- Milan Pavlović (actor) (born 1970), Bosnian actor and TV personality
- Milan Pavlovič (born 1980), Slovak footballer
- Milena Pavlović-Barili (1909–1945), Serbian painter and poet
- Milica Pavlović (born 1991), Serbian pop-folk singer
- Miloš Pavlović (footballer) (born 1983), Serbian footballer
- Miloš Pavlović (racing driver) (born 1982), Serbian race car driver
- Miodrag Pavlović (1928–2014), Serbian poet
- Mirjan Pavlović (born 1989), Australian footballer
- Miroslav Pavlović (1942–2004), Serbian footballer
- Nataša Pavlović, Serbian-American mathematician
- Nebojša Pavlović (footballer) (born 1981), Serbian footballer
- Nemanja Pavlović (born 1977), Serbian footballer
- Otis Pavlovic (c. 2020s), Australian singer, songwriter, guitarist and pianist, best known as a member of Royel Otis
- Predrag Pavlović (born 1986), Serbian footballer
- Santiago Pavlovic (born 1946), Chilean journalist
- Siraba Dembélé Pavlović (born 1986), French handballer
- Steve Pavlovic (born 1967), Australian music promoter
- Strahinja Pavlović (born 2001), Serbian football player
- Vladan Pavlović (born 1984), Serbian football player
- Željko Pavlović (born 1971), Croatian football goalkeeper
- Živojin Pavlović (1933–1998), Serbian film director and writer
- Zlatoje Pavlović (born 1995), Serbian footballer
- Zoran Pavlovič (born 1976), Slovenian footballer
