= Vjekoslav Vrančić =

Croatian Ustaše official

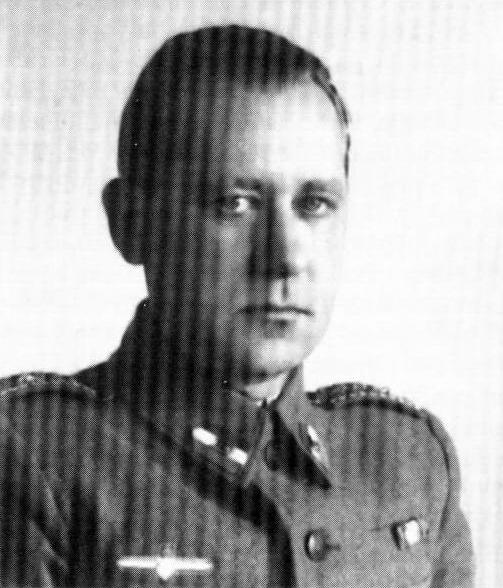
- Vjekoslav Vrančić in his minister uniform

4th Minister of Craftmanship and Trade of the Independent State of Croatia
- In office 1 February 1944 – 8 May 1945
- Prime Minister: Nikola Mandić
- Preceded by: Josip Cabas
- Succeeded by: Office abolished

Personal details
- Born: 25 March 1904 Ljubuški, Austria-Hungary
- Died: 25 September 1990 (aged 86) Ramos Mejía, Buenos Aires, Argentina
- Citizenship: Argentina
- Party: Croatian Liberation Movement (1956–1958; 1960–1990; his death)
- Other political affiliations: Croatian Peasant Party (1925–1936) Ustaše (1936–1945)
- Education: University of Vienna
- Occupation: Politician
- Profession: Economist

Vjekoslav Vrančić (25 March 1904 – 25 September 1990) was a high-ranked Croatian Ustaše official who held different positions in the Independent State of Croatia during World War II in Yugoslavia. After the proclamation, he served as the Under Secretary of the Ustaše Foreign Affairs Ministry. In 1942, he was Pavelić's envoy to the Italian Second Army. In this role he entered into negotiations with Chetnik representatives Jevđeviċ, Grđiċ and Kraljeviċ. Then he served as Under Secretary in the Ustaše Interior Ministry, the "body directly responsible for concentration camps and repressive political apparatus". Vrančić was "decorated by Hitler in honor of his planning skills at the work of mass deportation".

== Career ==
He was a confidant of Ante Pavelić and a delegate to important political and military events in Bosnia and Herzegovina. Vrančić was an Ustaša who wrote directives denying Muslims as a nation and claiming that Bosnian Muslims were Croats of Islamic faith. Contrary to Pavelić's confidence in Vrančić, Eugen Dido Kvaternik, a high-ranked Ustaša, wrote that Vrančić was "a blind instrument of Pavelić's personal intrigues".

Vrančić, as Pavelić's representative, was in charge of facilitating the establishment of the "Kroatische Waffen-SS Freiwilligen Division" with the SS high-ranked officers in Zagreb on 5 May 1943. He reached the rank of Major in the Ustaša forces. More significantly, he held the government posts of Assistant Minister of Foreign Affairs and later Minister of Labour of the Independent State of Croatia.

To facilitate the Ustaše regime surrender to the Western Allies, Pavelić sent Vrančić (with Andrija Vrkljan as interpreter) to the Allied supreme commander in Italy. Vrančić and Vrkljan were interned in a POW camp.

Vrančić was allowed to escape to protective custody of the Vatican with the help of United States Intelligence. He fled Italy to Argentina under false papers obtained with the help of Msgr. Krunoslav Draganović. He was active in the Croatian community of Argentina, and became vice-president of the Croatian so-called "government in exile" under Ante Pavelić. He was involved in terrorist activities with extreme right-wing Argentine political groups. For his activities among exiled Ustaše, Vrančić was barred from entering Australia in 1974. In Argentina, he founded a weekly newspaper, Hrvatski narod (Croatian People).

At the Croatian National Council's parliament in 1980, Vrančić claimed the new Croatian nation could not rely on the tradition of the Independent State of Croatia, and would have to minimize that tradition as much as possible.

== Death ==
He lived in Buenos Aires until his death in 1990.
