= Pavlovich =

Pavlovich may refer to:

- Pavlovich (patronymic), a patronymic
- Pavlovich (surname), a surname
- Pavlovich v. Superior Court, a California Supreme Court case dealing with personal jurisdiction based on online activities
