= Cameron Lindsay =

Cameron Lindsay may refer to:

- Cameron Lindsay (footballer) (born 1992), New Zealand footballer
- Cameron Lindsay (rugby union) (born 1991), South African rugby union player
