= Pavletić =

Pavletić or Pavletic is a Croatian family name that may refer to:

- Ivan Pavletic (born 1974), Croatian American actor, director and writer
- Slavko Pavletić (1917–1945), Croatian footballer
- Steven Z. Pavletic (born 1956), Croatian American medical scientist
- Vlatko Pavletić (1930–2007), Croatian politician and literary critic
