= Alex Smith (footballer, born 1985) =

Soccer player (born 1985)

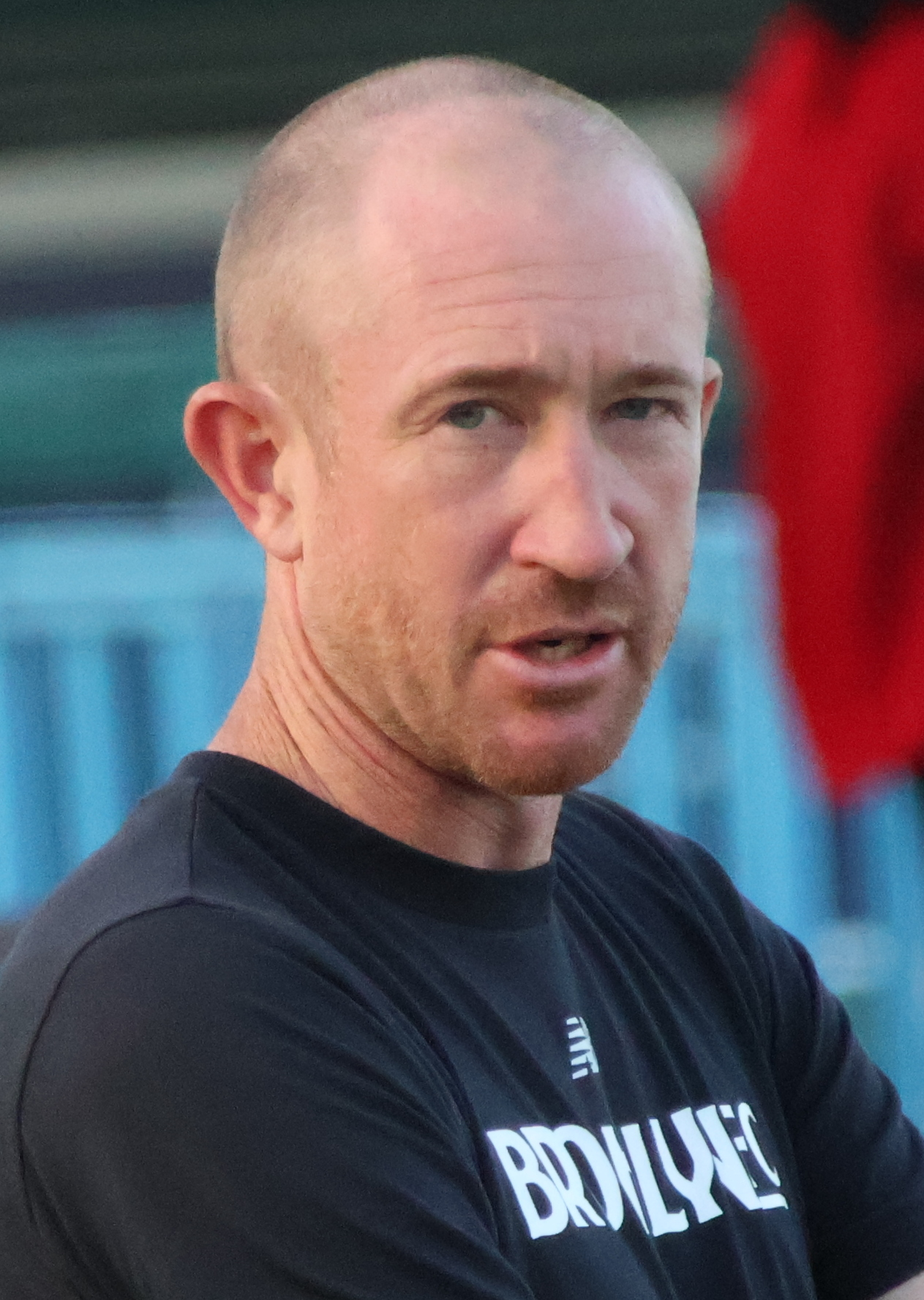
- Smith with Brooklyn FC in 2026

Personal information
- Full name: Alexander Moreton Smith
- Date of birth: 16 July 1985 (age 41)
- Place of birth: Windsor, England
- Position: Central midfielder

Team information
- Current team: Brooklyn FC (head coach)

College career
Years	Team	Apps	(Gls)
2003	Centenary Gentlemen		
2004	SMU Mustangs		

Senior career*
Years	Team	Apps	(Gls)
2006	FC Dallas	0	(0)
2007	DFW Tornados	6	(3)
2010	Fraser Park	20	(11)
2011	Sydney Olympic	14	(10)
2011	Gold Coast United	0	(0)
2011–2013	Wellington Phoenix	40	(1)
2013	Oakleigh Cannons	12	(2)
2014–2015	Far North Queensland	41	(33)
2016	Negeri Sembilan	25	(8)
2017	Johor Darul Ta'zim II	14	(3)
2018	Sunshine Coast	5	(2)
2018–2019	Olympic FC	38	(27)
Total		212	(100)

Managerial career
- 2023: Melbourne City FC women (assistant)
- 2023–2026: Brisbane Roar FC women
- 2026–: Brooklyn FC
- * Club domestic league appearances and goals as of 18 September 2019 ‡ National team caps and goals as of 8 October 2016

Alexander Moreton Smith (born 16 July 1985) is an American soccer coach and former player who is currently the head coach of USL Super League club Brooklyn FC. He also holds Australian and British citizenship.

== College soccer ==
Smith was born in Windsor, England, and moved to the United States at age one. He began his soccer career whilst at college in the United States. He played 17 times for Centenary College of Louisiana scoring six times with six assists. In 2004, he transferred to Southern Methodist University where he scored a further 13 in 19 appearances for the Mustangs. In his solitary year at SMU, he was selected to the Missouri Valley Conference 1st Team and the All-Midwest Region 2nd Team.

== MLS ==
Smith travelled to England in 2005 to trial with Shrewsbury Town and Walsall. Returning to the US later in 2005, he was declared ineligible to continue playing college soccer by the NCAA. Because of Smith's NCAA ineligibility, he was unable to enter the MLS Superdraft. Smith was then classed as a discovery signing and after interest from MLS club Kansas City Wizards, he signed one-year contract with FC Dallas almost a year after his last game with Southern Methodist University. Smith would only feature in the reserves in his year with the MLS club, scoring on 2 occasions. Disillusioned with his stint in the MLS, Smith quit football at the age of 21.

== Australia ==
After previously visiting Australia on holiday, he moved to Cairns in 2010, and later moved to Sydney. By this time he had started playing football again. In Sydney he signed for NSW Super League club Fraser Park and duly won the 2010 NSW Super League Player of the Year award.

=== Sydney Olympic ===
Smith signed for NSW Premier League club Sydney Olympic for the 2011 NSW Premier League season and scored a hat trick on debut against South Coast Wolves in Round 1 and scored the only goal in their 1–0 win over 2010 NSW Premier League champions Blacktown City. Smith played his final game for Olympic in the Round 12, 1–0 win over South Coast Wolves.

=== Gold Coast United ===
Smith was invited to trial with Gold Coast United while he was playing for Fraser Park. United coach Miron Bleiberg signed Smith on a one-year contract for the 2011–12 A-League season. He officially joined their squad, and had his first proper training session on 17 June.

Despite Smith joining Gold Coast United for their pre-season, Bleiberg asked Smith to accept a contract pay out, in exchange for the immediate termination of his one-year contract, as Bleiberg wanted to sign former Blackburn Rovers striker Maceo Rigters, who had turned down a contract with Wellington Phoenix. On 1 September 2011, it was confirmed that Smith and United had reached an agreement in regards to the termination of his contract.

=== Return to Belmore ===
After being released from Gold Coast United, Smith returned to New South Wales where it was announced he would re-sign with Sydney Olympic. He arrived in time for the Final Round match of the NSW Premier League, against APIA Leichhardt Tigers, and scored the opening goal for Olympic in their 3–0 victory, in which Olympic were crowned Premiers. Smith opened the scoring in the 2011 NSW Premier League Grand Final against Sydney United. Olympic would go on to win 2–0, securing the first Premiership and Championship double since the NSL folded.

After spending the month travelling from Sydney to the Gold Coast, where he still resided, it was announced he would fly to Wellington, New Zealand to trial with Wellington Phoenix with a view to securing an injury replacement contract, with the hope of extending it to a full contract.

=== Wellington Phoenix ===
Smith signed a short-term contract with the Phoenix as an injury replacement player, for Mirjan Pavlovic who broke his arm while training. He made his A-League debut off the bench in the Round 2 victory against the Newcastle Jets in Wellington. On 18 January 2012 Smith's contract was made permanent lasting until the end of the season. Smith went on to make 24 appearances that season. It was then announced Smith had signed for the 2012–13 season. He started the first 11 games of the season but fell out of favour with coach Ricki Herbert. In June 2013 it was announced that Smith would not be offered a new deal with the club.

=== Far North Queensland Heat ===
In late 2013, Smith decided to sign with Far North Queensland FC. He was awaiting his Australian citizenship, which would allow him a possible return to the A-League. Smith's first game for the Heat was against their rivals Northern Fury FC in Townsville. In the 44th minute, the captain scored the opening goal of FNQ FC Heat's 2014 campaign and his first goal for the club. Smith helped his side reach the inaugural FFA Cup round of 32 where they played away to Sydney United 58. Moreover, his 18 league goals guided the heat to a top two finish in only their second season since formation. However, his hat-trick in the Semi Final against Olympic FC was not enough to get the side into their first National Premier Leagues Queensland Grand Final. In 2015, his goal scoring ability again helped his team reach the FFA Cup for a second consecutive year. In seven FFA Cup games in his time at the Heat, he scored 13 goals.

=== Malaysia ===
In early December 2015 it was announced that Smith had travelled to Malaysia to sign with Malaysia Premier League club NS Matrix for the 2016 season. Smith linked up with former Sydney Olympic FC player and coach Gary Phillips, who played the majority of his career with Sydney Olympic and won the 2001–02 National Soccer League as manager. After a successful individual season with NS Matrix, it was announced in December 2016 that Smith had signed with Johor Darul Ta'zim FC II for the 2017 Malaysia Premier League season. He spent a year at the club, scoring twice and helping the team to a 4th-place finish. He then decided to return to Australia to focus on his coaching development.

=== Return to Australia ===
Smith joined Olympic FC in May for the remainder of the 2018 NPL Queensland season. For the 2nd time in his career, he scored a hat trick on debut in the FFA Cup against Moreton Bay United FC. He went on to score 27 goals in 38 games for the club and guide the team to 2 consecutive NPL Queensland Grand Finals, however was unable to play in either due to injury. In his 8 FFA Cup games for the club he scored 7 goals. After playing with a ruptured ACL in the 2nd half of the 2019 season, Smith decided to retire and pursue his coaching career. In 2019, Smith won the NPL Queensland Player of the year award.

== Coaching career ==
=== Brisbane Roar ===
While still playing at Olympic in 2018–19, Smith worked as a W-League Assistant Coach at Brisbane Roar.

=== Melbourne City ===
After retiring, Smith was appointed as an assistant coach at Melbourne City Women, working under Head Coach Rado Vidošić. He also worked in the Melbourne City Academy.

On 8 January 2023, Smith returned to Melbourne City Women as an assistant coach, having been head hunted by interim Head Coach Dario Vidošić after his strong season with Peninsula Power. Only assistant coach for a short period, due to a mid-season holiday, Smith returned to Brisbane, taking a break from coaching to focus on family.

=== Return to Brisbane Roar ===
Smith coaching the Brisbane Roar in 2026.

In November 2023, partway through the 2023–24 A-League Women season, Smith was appointed head coach of Brisbane Roar, following the sacking of Garrath McPherson.

In July 2026, following a record-breaking season, Smith departed Brisbane Roar to take up an opportunity overseas.

=== Brooklyn FC ===
On 8 July 2026, Smith was appointed as head coach of American USL Super League club Brooklyn FC.

== Honours ==
Playing Honours

- NSW Super League Player of the Year: 2010
- NSW Premier League Premiership, Champion 2011
- NSW Premier League Team of the Season 2011
- NPL Queensland Team of the Season: 2014, 2019
- NPL Queensland Player of the Year: 2019
- Australia Cup Peninsula Power Goal Scoring Hero off the bench to advance to Quarter Finals for first time in Club history.

=== Coaching honours ===
- W-League Premiership 2020
- W-League Championship 2020
- FQPL1 Premiers 2022 (Undefeated season)
