= Krešimir Pavelić =

Croatian scientist

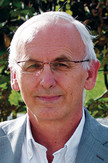
- (2014)
- Born: July 19, 1952 (age 74)
- Education: University of Zagreb
- Occupations: Scientist, academic

Krešimir Pavelić (born July 19, 1952) is a Croatian scientist in the field of biomedical and healthcare, the field of fundamental medical sciences. He held the post of Secretary General of the European Organization for Molecular Biology (EMBO) and was the head of the National Cancer Research Program.

== Education ==
Born in Slavonski Brod, Pavelić graduated from the Faculty of Medicine in Zagreb in 1975 and became a doctor of medicine. In the same year, he enrolled in a master's degree in science in the field of biomedicine. In 1979, he acquired the title of Doctor of Medical Sciences at the same faculty.

== Academic career ==
In the 1980s, he was researching in the field of oncology, microbiology and diabetes in Zagreb and New York. From 1982 to 1989, at the Faculty of Pharmacy and Biochemistry, University of Zagreb, he taught the class on Anatomy and Physiology, and in 1990 the class on Molecular Biology. He earned the titles of research associate, senior research associate and scientific advisor at the Rudjer Boskovic Institute in 1980, 1981 and 1985, respectively. From 1991 to 2007, he conducted research at the Rudjer Boskovic Institute in Zagreb, where he founded the Institute of Molecular Medicine.

In 2007, he was elected a full professor at the Faculty of Medicine in Rijeka. Since 2008 he has been the head of the head of the head, and from 2009 to 2015 he has been the head of the Department of Biotechnology, University of Rijeka. At the same institution in 2012, he was elected a full professor in a permanent vocation.

In 2018, he left the Biotechnology Department and moved to the University of Pula, where in October he was appointed rector for the acting dean of the Faculty of Medicine. Considering that the study of medicine at college was not initiated due to the absence of the permit, Pavelic was hired to teach at the Nursing Studies.

== Scientific and professional work ==
In 1994, Pavelić participated in the establishment of a network of so-called tumor banks in Eastern and Central Europe as part of the Establishment of the Eastern and Central European Human Tumor Bank project. Since 1997 he has been the head of the National Cancer Research Program.

From 2011 to 2013, he worked on a medical research for osteoporosis in collaboration with the Austrian company Panaceo International Active Mineral Production resulting in a patent.

During the Pandemia of COVID-19 in Croatia, Pavelić had a number of media outlets in which he questioned the origin of the Sars-Cov-2 virus and the justification of vaccination. Given the media attacks on Professor Dr. Sc. Krešimir Pavelić, he initiated a lawsuit, in which he was justified received – the 24sata media had to pay him compensation worth 30,000 HRK based on the judge's verdict, due to tarnishing his reputation and citing false claims.

== Memberships ==
Pavelić has been a member of the Croatian Academy of Sciences and Arts since 1992, and since 2002 he has been a full member of the European Organization for Molecular Biology (EMBO). From 2008 to 2013 he was the Secretary General of the EMBO. He is also a member of the European Academy of Sciences and Arts.
