= Pavlich =

Pavlich is an anglicized version of the Croatian surname Pavlić. Notable people with the surname include:

- W. S. Pavlich (born unknown), writer
- Katie Pavlich (born 1988), American journalist
- Matthew Pavlich (born 1981), Australian footballer
- Michael Pavlich, Australian broadcaster
