= Nikolas Tsattalios =

Australian soccer player

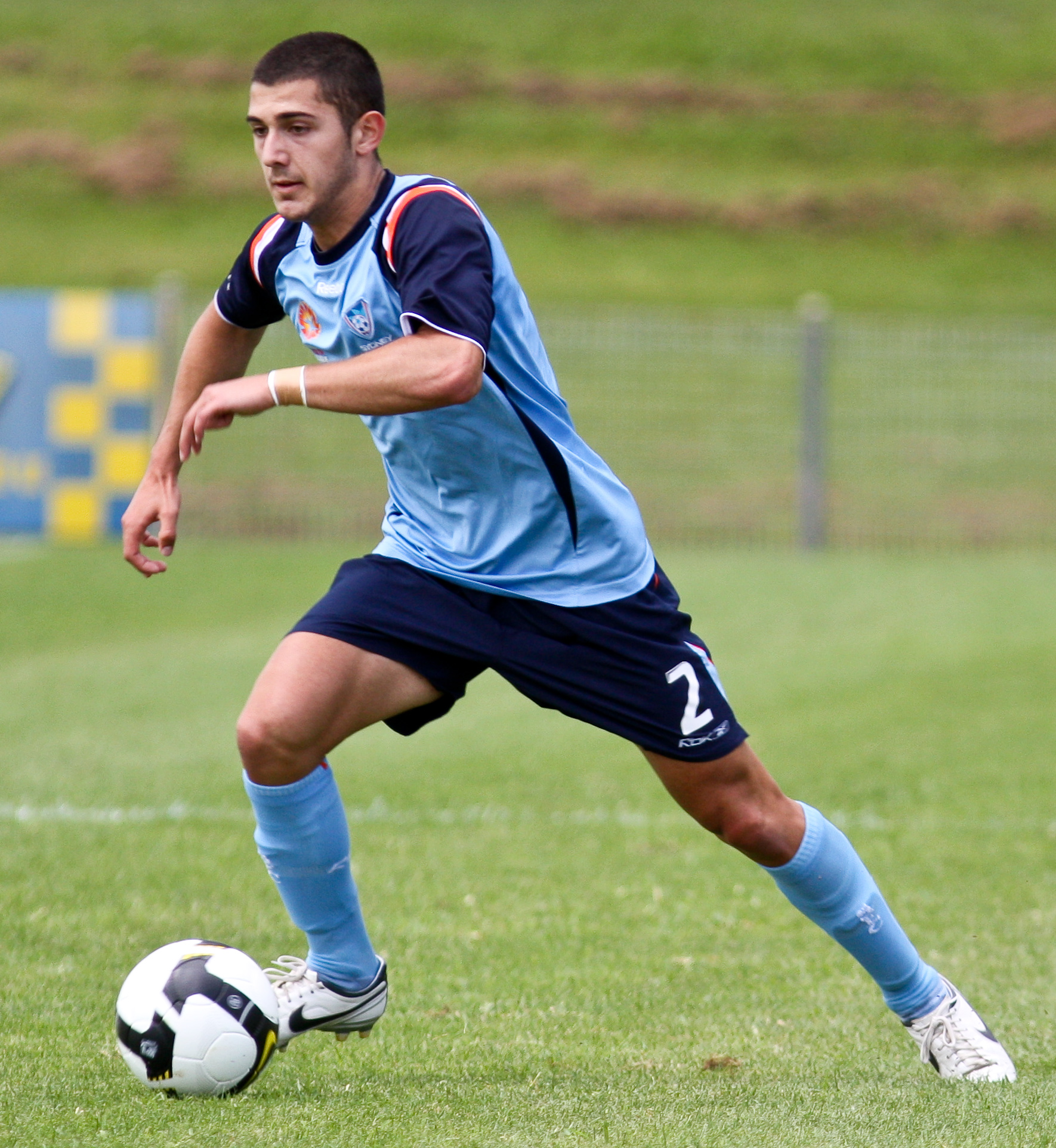

Personal information
- Full name: Nikolas Constantinos Tsattalios
- Date of birth: 1 March 1990 (age 36)
- Place of birth: Sydney, Australia
- Height: 1.80 m (5 ft 11 in)
- Positions: Left winger; left back

Team information
- Current team: Sydney Olympic

Youth career
- 1996–2000: Carss Park
- St. George
- Sydney Olympic
- 2006–2007: NSWIS

Senior career*
Years	Team	Apps	(Gls)
2007–2009	Sydney FC	6	(0)
2008	→ Penrith Nepean United (loan)	7	(0)
2009	Newcastle Jets	0	(0)
2010	Sydney Olympic	14	(2)
2011	Sutherland Sharks	14	(3)
2011–2012	Wellington Phoenix	5	(0)
2012–2014	Sutherland Sharks	26	(5)
2014	Kampaniakos		
2015–	Sydney Olympic	81	(5)

International career^{‡}
2008–2009	Australia U20	8	(0)
- * Club domestic league appearances and goals as of 23 September 2019 ‡ National team caps and goals as of 15 December 2007

Nikolas Constantinos Tsattalios (born 1 March 1990) is an Australian soccer player who plays for Sydney Olympic FC.

== Club career ==
Tsattalios grew up in Sydney playing for his local Carss Park Soccer Club, alongside former Sydney FC teammate Dean Bouzanis.

=== Sydney FC ===
Tsattalios made his A-League debut on 12 October 2007 against Perth Glory as a second-half substitute. He played just five games for Sydney and eventually was released by the club.

He was signed by the Newcastle Jets for the 2009 AFC Champions League on a six-month contract with the option of an extension into the A-League 2009-10 season.

=== Sydney Olympic ===
Sydney Olympic signed Tsattalios for the 2010 NSW Premier League season.

=== Sutherland Sharks ===
Tsattalios signed for the Sutherland Sharks for the 2011 NSW Premier League season.

=== Wellington Phoenix ===
On 19 July 2011, it was announced that Tsattalios had signed with the Wellington Phoenix in the A-League.

=== Sutherland Sharks ===
On 1 June 2012, Tstallios re-joined NSW Premier League club Sutherland Sharks.

== International career ==
In 2006, he joined the NSW Institute of Sport football program leading to being named as a stand-by player for the Joeys squad for the AFC U-17 Championship 2006.

== Honours ==
With Australia:

- AFF U19 Youth Championship: 2008
