= Ivan Pavletic =

- Born: Ivan Pavletić; March 21, 1974 (age 52); Karlovac, Croatia
- Years active: 1999–present

Ivan Pavletic (born March 21, 1974) is a Croatian American actor, director, and writer. He wrote and directed the film 476 A.D..

== Filmography ==
Film
Year	Title	Role	Notes
2005	Eine Prinzessin zum Verlieben	uncredited	TV film
2006	Eine Krone für Isabell	Main Butler	TV film
2009	"Tough Luck"	Steve King	Short film
2009	"Smoke"	The Hitman	Video short
2011	"Drop Gun"	Taliban Leader	Short film
2012	"Déchiré"	Oskar	Short film
2012	"Escape"	The Artist	Short film
2012	"Path to Nowhere"	Third Magistrate	Short film
2013	"Five Steps"	Sampson	Short film
2013	SANE in 1974	Melvin Weinstein	
2014	"The Low Road, Baby"	Dan	Short film
2014	476 A.D. Chapter One: The Last Light of Aries	Flavius Aetius	
2014	"The Field That Grows Faster"	Pa	Short film
2014	Wash Park	Homeless Man	
2014	Kaptin Boom	Kaptin Boom	
2014	White Orb	Detective	
2015	"Fire Ripples"	Doctor	Short film
2015	"Young Bones"	The Husband	Short film
2015	"Wildflower"	Bounty Hunter	Short film
2015	"Between Haircuts"	Paulie	Short film
2016	476 A.D. Chapter Two: The Dawning of the Age of Pisces	Flavius Aetius	

Television
Year	Title	Role	Notes
2004–2005	Villa Maria	Doctor	TV series

Director
Year	Title	Role	Notes
2009	"Tough Luck"	Director	Short film
2010	"The Cosmopolitan"	Director	Short film
2013	SANE in 1974	Director	
2014	476 A.D. Chapter One: The Last Light of Aries	Director	
2016	476 A.D. Chapter Two: The Dawning of the Age of Pisces	Director	
2016	Tesla: Beyond Imagination (Tesla: Iznad mašte)	Director	
