= Laura Pavlović =

Serbian soprano opera singer

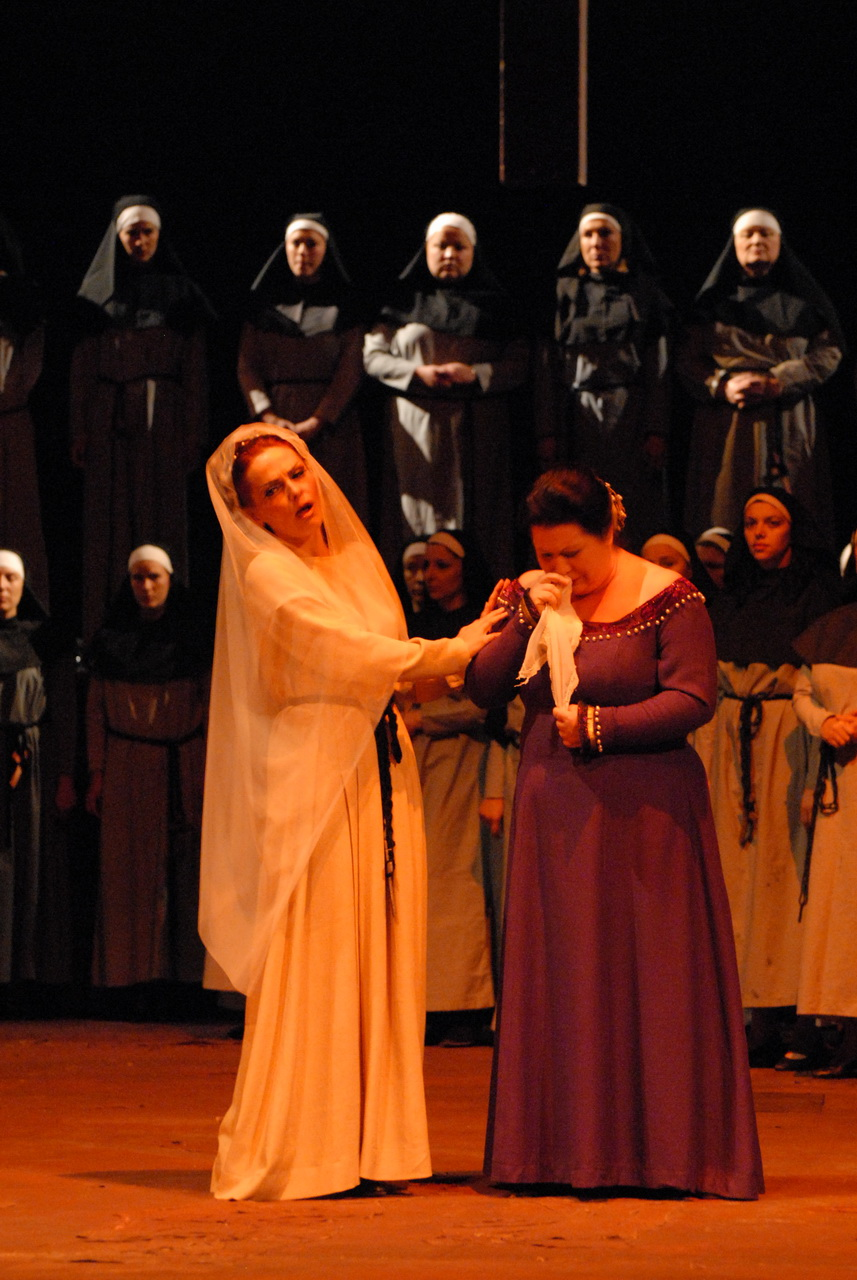

Laura Pavlović (born in Skopje, SR Macedonia, former Yugoslavia) is a Serbian lyric and spinto soprano opera singer, and a soloist with the Serbian National Theatre Opera in Novi Sad.

She completed the Isidor Bajić Music School in Novi Sad, and graduated from the Academy Of Arts, University of Novi Sad, where she was under the tuition of Biserka Cvejić. She has also been coached by Nikola Mitić, principal baritone of the National Opera Belgrade, and Olivera Miljaković of the Vienna State Opera, Austria.

Pavlović's debut leading role was as Đula in the comic opera Ero s onoga svijeta (Ero the Joker) by composer Jakov Gotovac. Her particular vocal style and stage presence have been noted by media critics.

In 2012, with pianist Strahinja Đokić she performed a series of solo concerts in several towns of Vojvodina, as part of a project devoted to promotion of heritage of Serbian operatic and vocal music.

== Roles ==
- Mimi (La bohème)
- Cio Cio San (Madame Butterfly)
- Lucy (The Telephone)
- Djula (Ero the Joker)
- Micaela (Carmen)
- Old Cat (Puss in Boots).
