= Pavličić =

Pavličić is a surname. Notable people with the surname include:

- Dubravko Pavličić (1967–2012), Croatian football player
- Igor Pavličić (born 1970), Serbian politician
- Milan Pavličić (born 1980), Croatian football player
- Pavao Pavličić (born 1946), Croatian writer, literary historian and translator
- Tomislav Pavličić (born 1983), Croatian football player
