= Pavlovich (surname) =

Pavlovich is an anglicized form or transliteration of the Slavic surnames Pavlović/Павловић (Serbo-Croatian) and Pavlovič/Павлович/Паўловіч/Павлович (Slovenian/Russian/Belarusian/Bulgarian). Notable people with the surname include:

- Nicolás Pavlovich (born 1978), Argentine footballer
- Parteniy Pavlovich (circa 1695 – 1760), Bulgarian Eastern Orthodox bishop
- Paul Pavlovich (born 1970), American artist
- Veronika Pavlovich (born 1978), Belarusian table tennis player
- Viktoria Pavlovich (born 1978), Belarusian table tennis player
- Vladislav Pavlovich (born 1971), Russian fencer
- Claudia Pavlovich Arellano Former Governor of the Mexican State of Sonora
- Pavlović noble family, served the Kingdom of Bosnia (1391–1463)
- Sergei Pavlovich (born 1992), Russian professional mixed martial artist
- Aleksandar Pavlović (footballer) (born 2004), Serbian-German football player
