= Cameron Lindsay (footballer) =

New Zealand footballer

Personal information
- Full name: Cameron Melrose Lindsay
- Date of birth: 21 December 1992 (age 33)
- Place of birth: Auckland, New Zealand
- Height: 1.80 m (5 ft 11 in)
- Position: Defensive midfielder

Youth career
- 2008–2011: Blackburn Rovers

Senior career*
Years	Team	Apps	(Gls)
2011–2013	Wellington Phoenix	4	(0)
2013–2014	Team Wellington	13	(2)
2014–2016	Auckland City FC	10	(0)
2016	Concord Rangers	1	(0)
2016–2018	Tasman United	33	(0)
2018–2019	Hawke's Bay United	16	(0)

International career^{‡}
2009	New Zealand U-17	8	(1)
2011	New Zealand U-20	4	(1)
2012	New Zealand U-23	4	(0)
2013	New Zealand	1	(0)
- * Club domestic league appearances and goals as of 4 August 2021 ‡ National team caps and goals as of 26 March 2013

Cameron Melrose Lindsay (born 21 December 1992) is a New Zealand footballer who plays as a defensive midfielder for Tasman United in the New Zealand Football Championship.

== Club career ==
Lindsay attended Wynton Rufer's WYNRS academy in Auckland and in 2007 contested the Manchester United Premier Cup with Central United. In 2009, he signed a four-year contract with Blackburn Rovers where he made 16 youth academy appearances. In 2011, he signed for Wellington Phoenix and despite making no appearances for the Phoenix during the 2011–12 A-League season signed a new two-year deal with club in April 2012.

Lindsay was in line to make his debut in the Round 2 away fixture versus Melbourne Heart due to seven Phoenix players being away on international duty but fell ill and was taken to hospital where doctors ruled him out of the game. He finally made his debut nearly three months later as a second-half substitute at AAMI Park against Melbourne Victory on 5 January 2013.

In September 2013 Lindsay was released from Wellington Phoenix and joined Team Wellington. At the end of the end of his first season with Team Wellington, he joined reigning champions Auckland City FC.

== International career ==
Lindsay was in the New Zealand under 17 side that contested the 2009 FIFA U-17 World Cup in Nigeria, playing in all 4 of New Zealand's matches. In 2011, he travelled with the New Zealand under 20 side to the 2011 FIFA U-20 World Cup in Colombia where he made a single appearance.

=== International goals and caps ===
New Zealand's goal tally first.

International appearances and goals
#	Date	Venue	Opponent	Result	Competition	Goal	Match Report
2013
1	26 March	Lawson Tama Stadium, Honiara	Solomon Islands	2–0	2014 FIFA World Cup Qualifier		NZ Football

=== International career statistics ===
New Zealand national team
Year	Apps	Goals
2013	1	0
Total	1	0
