= Mirjan Pavlović =

Australian soccer player (born 1989)

Mirjan Pavlovic
Personal information
- Full name: Mirjan Pavlović
- Date of birth: 21 March 1989 (age 37)
- Place of birth: Lika, SFR Yugoslavia
- Height: 1.87 m (6 ft 1 1/2 in)
- Position: Striker

Youth career
- West Sydney Wanderers
- 2008–2009: Newcastle Jets

Senior career*
Years	Team	Apps	(Gls)
2009	West Sydney Berries	3	(0)
2010	Newcastle Jets	3	(0)
2010	Sydney United 58	16	(6)
2010–2012	Wellington Phoenix	25	(2)
2012	→ Sydney United 58 (loan)	13	(3)
2013–2014	Sydney United 58 FC	16	(7)
2014	Pune FC	8	(3)
2014–2015	Sydney United 58	13	(7)
2015	Oakleigh Cannons	13	(8)
2016–2019	Marconi Stallions	65	(42)
2019–2020	Mt Druitt Rangers	9	(3)
2020	Sydney United 58	3	(0)

International career^{‡}
2010	Australia U-23	4	(0)
- * Club domestic league appearances and goals as of 17 February 2021 ‡ National team caps and goals as of 2 June 2011 (UTC)

Mirjan Pavlović (born 21 April 1989) is an Australian soccer player who last played for Sydney United 58. Mirjan "PAV" is currently the SAP Technical Director for NPL1 Club Blacktown City FC. He is also the owner of Football Culture, an Academy for junior footballers 3-12 old.

== Career ==
Pavlović was born in Lika, SR Croatia and moved to Australia when he was five years old.

He played for West Sydney Berries in the New South Wales Premier League before being signed to the Newcastle Jets youth team. He made his professional debut for the Jets, in their Round 27 loss to Adelaide United. He made two more appearances for the Jets that season, in the qualification final against Central Coast and in the semi-final against Wellington Phoenix.

He was released from the Jets at the end of that season and signed for NSWPL club Sydney United for their 2010 season. At Sydney United, he scored 6 goals in 16 matches, prompting a move to New Zealand-based Wellington Phoenix of the Australian A-League on a one-year youth deal, after a successful trial including matches against Boca Juniors and Wairarapa United. The latter match saw him score a hat-trick in a 5–1 victory.

On 18 November 2010, Pavlović signed a new two-year contract with the Phoenix, tying him to the club until March 2013. Pavlović's contract with the Phoenix was terminated by mutual consent on 14 November 2012.

On 28 February 2014, Pavlović signed for an I-League club Pune FC for a one-year deal.

He returned to Sydney United after the end of the season at Pune, and signed on for the remainder of the 2014 season. He signed on for the 2015 season, but left in the mid-season transfer window to move to Victoria, signing for Arthus Papas-led Oakleigh Cannons FC. He managed a goal and an assist in his second match for Oakleigh, leading them to a 2–0 win over the previously unbeaten South Melbourne FC.

Towards the end of October 2015, it was announced that Pavlović, and Oakleigh teammate Sean Rooney, would be signing for the recently relegated Marconi Stallions FC in the NSW NPL 2.

== Honours ==
With Sydney United:

- (Australia) National Premier Leagues NSW Premiership: 2013
- (Australia) National Premier Leagues Championship: 2013

With Marconi Stallions:

- (Australia) National Premier Leagues NSW 2 Premiership: 2017
- (Australia) National Premier Leagues NSW 2 Championship: 2017

== Personal life ==
Pavlović attended Patrician Brothers' College, Blacktown.

== A-League career statistics ==
All-Time Club Performances
Club	Season	A-League		Finals Series		Asia		Total
Club	Season	App	Goals	App	Goals	App	Goals	App	Goals
Newcastle United Jets (A-League)	2009–10	3	0					3	0
Newcastle United Jets (A-League)	Club Total	3	0					3	0
Club	Season	A-League		Finals Series		Asia		Total
Club	Season	App	Goals	App	Goals	App	Goals	App	Goals
Wellington Phoenix (A-League)	2010–11	10	0					10	0
Wellington Phoenix (A-League)	Club Total	10	0					10	0
Career totals		13	0					13	0
Last updated 21 February 2011
