= 2012–13 Wellington Phoenix FC season =

Wellington Phoenix
2012–13 season
- Chairman: Rob Morrison
- Manager: Ricki Herbert (until round 22)
- Stadium: Westpac Stadium
- Top goalscorer: J. Brockie (16)
- Highest home attendance: 12,057 v Sydney; 6 October 2012
- Lowest home attendance: 3,060 v Melb. Heart; 3 March 2013
Home colours	Away colours

The 2012–13 season was the Wellington Phoenix's sixth season in the A-League. Many pegged the club to be a strong contender in the 2012–13 season, but the Phoenix finished in last place with points equal to Melbourne Heart, but with an inferior goal difference.

== Players ==
=== First-team squad ===
Note: Flags indicate national team as defined under FIFA eligibility rules; some limited exceptions apply. Players may hold more than one non-FIFA nationality.

No.	Pos.	Nation	Player
1	GK	NZL	Mark Paston
2	DF	MLT	Manny Muscat
3	DF	NZL	Tony Lochhead
4	MF	AUS	Isaka Cernak
5	DF	NZL	Michael Boxall
6	MF	USA	Alex Smith
7	MF	NZL	Leo Bertos
8	FW	BRB	Paul Ifill
9	FW	SOL	Benjamin Totori
10	FW	BEL	Stein Huysegems
11	MF	NZL	Jeremy Brockie
12	FW	NZL	Tyler Boyd (youth)
14	FW	AUS	Mirjan Pavlović
14	DF	NZL	Ian Hogg

No.	Pos.	Nation	Player
15	MF	NZL	Cameron Lindsay (youth)
16	MF	NZL	Louis Fenton (youth)
17	MF	AUS	Vince Lia
18	DF	NZL	Ben Sigmund (vice captain)
19	MF	AUS	Jimmy Downey
20	GK	NZL	Glen Moss
21	MF	ESP	Dani Sánchez
22	DF	AUS	Andrew Durante (captain)
23	MF	AUS	Lucas Pantelis
23	FW	AUS	Corey Gameiro (on loan from Fulham)
28	FW	PAN	Ricardo Clarke (on loan from Sporting San Miguelito)
30	GK	AUS	Griffin McMaster (injury replacement)
39	GK	NZL	Jacob Spoonley (on loan from Auckland City FC)

=== Reserve squad ===
Football School of Excellence players

Note: Flags indicate national team as defined under FIFA eligibility rules; some limited exceptions apply. Players may hold more than one non-FIFA nationality.

No.	Pos.	Nation	Player
29	DF	NZL	Luke Rowe
30	GK	NZL	Scott Basalaj
31	MF	NZL	Tom Biss
32	MF	NZL	Justin Gulley

No.	Pos.	Nation	Player
35	MF	NZL	Hamish Watson
36	DF	NZL	Alec Solomons
38	MF	NZL	Tom Doyle
—	MF	GER	Tobias Bertsch

=== Contract extensions ===
No.	Pos.	Player	Contract extension	Expires (season end)
1	GK	(New Zealand) Mark Paston	1 year	2012–13
21	MF	(Spain) Dani Sánchez	1 year	2012–13
6	MF	(United States) Alex Smith	1 year	2012–13
15	MF	(New Zealand) Cameron Lindsay	2 years	2013–14
17	MF	(Australia) Vince Lia	2 years	2013–14
18	DF	(New Zealand) Ben Sigmund	2 Years	2014–15

=== Transfers ===
==== In ====
No.	Pos.	Player	From†	Date	Notes
20	GK	(New Zealand) Glen Moss	(Australia) Gold Coast United	28 March 2012	three-year contract
11	FW	(New Zealand) Jeremy Brockie	( (Australia) Newcastle Jets)	14 May 2012	three-year contract
9	FW	(Solomon Islands) Benjamin Totori	(Solomon Islands) Koloale FC	19 June 2012	one-year contract
5	DF	(New Zealand) Michael Boxall	( (Canada) Vancouver Whitecaps FC)	16 July 2012	two-year contract
10	FW	(Belgium) Stein Huysegems	( (Belgium) Lierse S.K.)	14 September 2012	two-year contract
12	FW	(New Zealand) Tyler Boyd	(New Zealand) Waikato FC	17 September 2012	three-year contract
16	MF	(New Zealand) Louis Fenton	(New Zealand) Team Wellington	19 September 2012	three-year contract
30	GK	(Australia) Griffin McMaster	(Australia) Bentleigh Greens	30 November 2012	Injury-replacement contract
14	DF	(New Zealand) Ian Hogg	( (United States) Portland Timbers)	7 January 2013	6-month contract
4	MF	(Australia) Isaka Cernak	(Australia) Melbourne Victory	24 January 2013	6-month contract

† Brackets round club names indicate the player's contract with that club had expired before he joined Wellington Phoenix.

==== Out ====
No.	Pos.	Player	To†	Date	Notes
6	MF	(New Zealand) Tim Brown	Retired	26 March 2012	
12	MF	(Australia) Nick Ward	(Australia) Perth Glory	27 April 2012	
11	MF	(Brazil) Daniel	( (Thailand) Insee Police United F.C.)	8 May 2012	
13	DF	(Australia) Nikolas Tsattalios	( (Australia) Sutherland Sharks)	1 June 2012	
20	GK	(Trinidad and Tobago) Tony Warner	( (Malta) Floriana F.C.)	22 June 2012	
9	FW	(England) Chris Greenacre	Retired	18 July 2012	
4	DF	(Australia) Brent Griffiths	( (Australia) Central Coast Mariners)	30 July 2012	
14	FW	(Australia) Mirjan Pavlović	( (Australia) Sydney United)	14 November 2012	Contract terminated
28	FW	(Panama) Ricardo Clarke	(Panama) Sporting San Miguelito	6 December 2012	Loan terminated
30	GK	(Australia) Griffin McMaster	(Australia) Bentleigh Greens	17 January 2013	Moss back to fitness

† Brackets round a club denote the player joined that club after his Wellington Phoenix contract expired.

==== Loans in ====
No.	Pos.	Player	From†	Date	Duration
28	FW	(Panama) Ricardo Clarke	(Panama) Sporting San Miguelito	22 September 2012	Jan 2013 (opt. to extend or buy)
39	GK	(New Zealand) Jacob Spoonley	(New Zealand) Auckland City	11 October 2012	one-game contract
23	FW	(Australia) Corey Gameiro	(England) Fulham	9 February 2013	Until end of season

==== Loans out ====
No.	Pos.	Player	To†	Date	Duration
14	FW	(Australia) Mirjan Pavlovic	(Australia) Sydney United FC	July 2012	3 Months

== Matches ==
=== 2012–13 pre-season friendlies ===
9 August 2012	Lower Hutt (New Zealand)	0–4	(New Zealand) Wellington Phoenix	Wakefield Park, Wellington
Thursday 19:00 NZST		(0–2)	10' A. Smith; 22', 57' J. Brockie; 90' L. Fenton

14 August 2012	Miramar Rangers (New Zealand)	0–9	(New Zealand) Wellington Phoenix	Porirua Park, Porirua
Tuesday 19:30 NZST		(0–4)	10' B. Totori; 13', 68', 75', 87' T. Boyd; 14' P. Ifill; 45+2', 46' J. Brockie; 82' T. Doyle

18 August 2012	Newcastle Jets (Australia)	3–1	(New Zealand) Wellington Phoenix	Weston, Australia
Saturday 19:00 NZST	C. Goodwin 36', 51'; M. Jesic 73'; T. Calvano (red card) 25'	(1–1); Report	16' A. Smith; (red card) 25' B. Sigmund; (red card) 25' M. Muscat; (red card) 63' A. Durante	Attendance: 1,962; Referee: (Australia) Tim McGilchrist

24 August 2012	United Sikkim (India)	0–3	(New Zealand) Wellington Phoenix	Khuman Lampak Main Stadium, Imphal, India
North East Super Series; Friday 14:30 IST; Friday 20:30 NZST		(0–2); Report 1 Report 2	34' P. Ifill; 45' T. Boyd; 88' L. Fenton	Attendance: 7–8,000

26 August 2012	Shillong Lajong (India)	2–5	(New Zealand) Wellington Phoenix	Khuman Lampak Main Stadium, Imphal, India
North East Super Series; Sunday 14:30 IST; Sunday 20:30 NZST	G. Friday x2	(0–2); Report 1 Report 2	15', 41', 60', 86' J. Brockie; 90' T. Biss	Attendance: 15,000

29 August 2012	Royal Wahingdoh (India)	0–3	(New Zealand) Wellington Phoenix	Nehru Stadium, Shillong, India
Friendly; Wednesday 15:15 IST; Wednesday 21:45 NZST		(0–1); Report 1 Report 2	27', 46', 90' (pen.) J. Brockie

1 September 2012	Shillong Lajong (India)	3–2	(New Zealand) Wellington Phoenix	Nehru Stadium, Shillong, India
North East Super Series Final; Saturday 15:15 IST; Saturday 21:45 NZST	G. Friday 27', 32'; B. Haokip 84'	(2–1); Report 1 Report 2	5' J. Brockie; 63' (pen.) P. Ifill

11 September 2012	Petone (New Zealand)	0–4	(New Zealand) Wellington Phoenix	Porirua Park, Porirua
Tuesday NZST

18 September 2012	Team Wellington (New Zealand)	0–5	(New Zealand) Wellington Phoenix	Porirua Park, Porirua
Tuesday 19:30 NZST

23 September 2012	Wellington Phoenix (New Zealand)	1–1	(Australia) West Sydney Wanderers	AMI Stadium, Christchurch, New Zealand
	J. Brockie 47'		30' A. Mooy

29 September 2012	YoungHeart Manawatu (New Zealand)	1–7	(New Zealand) Wellington Phoenix	Memorial Park, Palmerston North, New Zealand
Saturday 14:00 NZST	H. Watson 46'	(0–5); Report	7', 33', 40' J. Brockie; 12' L. Fenton; 41' S. Huysegems; 70' R. Clarke; 90' T. Boyd

=== 2012–13 A-League fixtures ===
6 October 2012 Round 1	Wellington Phoenix	2–0	Sydney FC	Westpac Stadium, Wellington
19:30 NZDT; 16:30 AEST Wellington Starting XI: 01 (New Zealand) GK Mark Paston; 02 (Malta) MF Manny Muscat; 03 (New Zealand) DF Tony Lochhead; 06 (United States) MF Alex Smith; 07 (New Zealand) MF Leo Bertos; 09 (Solomon Islands) FW Benjamin Totori (substituted off) 61'; 10 (Belgium) FW Stein Huysegems (substituted off) 89'; 11 (New Zealand) MF Jeremy Brockie; 16 (New Zealand) MF Louis Fenton (substituted off) 77'; 18 (New Zealand) DF Ben Sigmund; 22 (Australia) DF Andrew Durante (c); Substitutes: 20 (New Zealand) GK Glen Moss; 08 (Barbados) FW Paul Ifill (substituted on) 61'; 12 (New Zealand) FW Tyler Boyd (substituted on) 77'; 28 (Panama) FW Ricardo Clarke (substituted on) 89'	S. Huysegems 43'; J. Brockie (yellow card) 70'; L. Fenton 75'	(1–0); Report; Summary	(yellow card) 19' T. Antonis; (yellow card) 47' T. McFlynn	Attendance: 12,057; Referee: (Australia) Peter Green Sydney Starting XI: 01 (Australia) GK Ivan Necevski; 03 (Brazil) DF Fabio Alves; 07 (Australia) MF Brett Emerton; 08 (Australia) MF Adam Griffiths; 10 (Italy) FW Alessandro Del Piero; 15 (Northern Ireland) MF Terry McFlynn (c); 16 (Australia) MF Joel Chianese; 17 (Australia) MF Terry Antonis (substituted off) 59'; 18 (Australia) DF Trent McClenahan; 19 (Croatia) FW Krunoslav Lovrek (substituted off) 59'; Substitutes: 20 (Australia) GK Vedran Janjetović; 02 (Australia) DF Sebastian Ryall; 21 (Panama) FW Yairo Yau (substituted on) 59'; 22 (Iraq) MF Ali Abbas (substituted on) 59'

14 October 2012 Round 2	Melbourne Heart	1–1	Wellington Phoenix	AAMI Park, Melbourne
15:00 AEDT; 17:00 NZDT Melbourne Starting XI: 01 (Australia) GK Clint Bolton; 02 (Australia) DF Michael Marrone; 04 (Australia) DF Simon Colosimo; 05 (Brazil) MF Fred (c); 06 (Liberia) DF Patrick Gerhardt; 08 (Australia) FW Matt Thompson; 09 (Australia) FW Dylan Macallister (substituted off) 81'; 10 (Croatia) FW Josip Tadić (substituted off) 49'; 11 (Australia) MF Richard Garcia; 16 (Australia) DF Aziz Behich; 23 (Australia) FW Mate Dugandžić (substituted off) 81'; Substitutes: 20 (Australia) GK Andrew Redmayne; 17 (Australia) FW Jason Hoffman; 18 (Australia) FW David Vranković (substituted on) 49'; 22 (Australia) DF Nick Kalmar (substituted on) 81'	M. Thompson 21'; Fred (yellow card) 45'; S. Colosimo (red card) 47'; D. Macallister (yellow card) 67'	(1–0); Report; Summary	(yellow card) 41' M. Boxall; 48' (pen.) P. Ifill; (yellow card) 70' A. Smith; (yellow card) 84' M. Muscat	Attendance: 11,007; Referee: (Australia) Kris Griffiths-Jones Wellington Starting XI: 39 (New Zealand) GK Jacob Spoonley; 02 (Malta) MF Manny Muscat; 05 (New Zealand) DF Michael Boxall; 06 (United States) MF Alex Smith; 08 (Barbados) FW Paul Ifill; 10 (Belgium) FW Stein Huysegems; 16 (New Zealand) MF Louis Fenton; 17 (Australia) MF Vince Lia; 22 (Australia) DF Andrew Durante (c); 29 (New Zealand) DF Luke Rowe; 31 (New Zealand) MF Tom Biss (substituted off) 81'; Substitutes: 30 (New Zealand) GK Scott Basalaj; 12 (New Zealand) FW Tyler Boyd (substituted on) 81'; 28 (Panama) FW Ricardo Clarke; 32 (Australia) DF Jimmy Downey

21 October 2012 Round 3	Wellington Phoenix	1–1	Brisbane Roar	Westpac Stadium, Wellington
16:30 NZDT; 14:30 AEDT Wellington Starting XI: 01 (New Zealand) GK Mark Paston; 02 (Malta) MF Manny Muscat; 03 (New Zealand) DF Tony Lochhead; 05 (New Zealand) DF Michael Boxall; 06 (United States) MF Alex Smith (substituted off) 82'; 07 (New Zealand) MF Leo Bertos; 08 (Barbados) FW Paul Ifill; 10 (Belgium) FW Stein Huysegems (substituted off) 61'; 11 (New Zealand) MF Jeremy Brockie; 16 (New Zealand) MF Louis Fenton (substituted off) 70'; 18 (New Zealand) DF Ben Sigmund (c); Substitutes: 20 (New Zealand) GK Glen Moss; 09 (Solomon Islands) FW Benjamin Totori (substituted on) 61'; 12 (New Zealand) FW Tyler Boyd (substituted on) 70'; 17 (Australia) MF Vince Lia (substituted on) 82'	S. Huysegems 16'; L. Fenton (yellow card) 62'	(1–1); Report; Summary	(yellow card) 18' S. Stefanutto; 39' B. Berisha	Attendance: 9,182; Referee: (Australia) Adam Kersey Brisbane Starting XI: 01 (Australia) GK Michael Theo; 02 (Australia) DF Matt Smith (c); 03 (Australia) DF Shane Stefanutto; 04 (Australia) DF Matthew Jurman; 06 (Australia) DF Erik Paartalu; 07 (Albania) FW Besart Berisha; 08 (Australia) MF Massimo Murdocca; 11 (Australia) MF Ben Halloran (substituted off) 76'; 17 (Australia) MF Mitch Nichols; 19 (Australia) DF Jack Hingert (substituted off) 90'; 22 (Germany) MF Thomas Broich (substituted off) 81'; Substitutes: 20 (Australia) GK Matt Acton; 10 (Brazil) FW Henrique (substituted on) 76'; 18 (Japan) DF Yuji Takahashi (substituted on) 90'; 24 (Australia) FW Nicholas Fitzgerald

27 October 2012 Round 4	Adelaide United	3–1	Wellington Phoenix	Hindmarsh Stadium, Adelaide
17:00 ACDT; 19:30 NZDT Adelaide Starting XI: 01 (Australia) GK Eugene Galeković (c); 02 (Australia) DF Osama Malik (substituted off) 88'; 05 (Australia) DF Iain Fyfe; 06 (Brazil) DF Cássio; 08 (Argentina) MF Marcelo Carrusca; 09 (Netherlands) FW Sergio van Dijk (substituted off) 75'; 10 (Australia) MF Dario Vidošić; 12 (Australia) DF Antony Golec; 16 (Australia) MF Daniel Bowles; 17 (Australia) MF Iain Ramsay (substituted off) 64'; 21 (Argentina) FW Jerónimo Neumann; Substitutes: 30 (Australia) GK John Hall; 11 (Australia) FW Bruce Djite (substituted on) 75'; 14 (Australia) MF Cameron Watson (substituted on) 88'; 22 (Portugal) MF Fábio Ferreira (substituted on) 64'	A. Golec (yellow card) 10'; J. Neumann 55', 84' (yellow card) 59'; Cássio 67' (yellow card) 78'; O. Malik (yellow card) 86'	(0–1); Report; Summary	(yellow card) 15' L. Fenton; 42' S. Huysegems; (red card) 76' B. Sigmund; (yellow card) 85' A. Durante; (yellow card) 90' J. Brockie	Attendance: 8,497; Referee: (Australia) Jarred Gillett Wellington Starting XI: 01 (New Zealand) GK Mark Paston; 02 (Malta) MF Manny Muscat; 03 (New Zealand) DF Tony Lochhead; 06 (United States) MF Alex Smith (substituted off) 51'; 07 (New Zealand) MF Leo Bertos; 08 (Barbados) FW Paul Ifill; 10 (Belgium) FW Stein Huysegems (substituted off) 73'; 11 (New Zealand) MF Jeremy Brockie; 16 (New Zealand) MF Louis Fenton (substituted off) 63'; 18 (New Zealand) DF Ben Sigmund; 22 (Australia) DF Andrew Durante (c); Substitutes: 20 (New Zealand) GK Glen Moss; 09 (Solomon Islands) FW Benjamin Totori (substituted on) 63'; 12 (New Zealand) FW Tyler Boyd (substituted on) 73'; 17 (Australia) MF Vince Lia (substituted on) 51'

5 November 2012 Round 5	Melbourne Victory	3–2	Wellington Phoenix	Etihad Stadium, Melbourne
19:30 AEDT; 21:30 NZDT Melbourne Starting XI: 39 (Australia) GK Nathan Coe; 03 (Ivory Coast) DF Adama Traoré; 04 (Australia) DF Petar Franjic; 05 (Australia) DF Mark Milligan; 07 (Brazil) MF Guilherme Finkler (substituted off) 59'; 09 (Argentina) MF Marcos Flores (substituted off) 75'; 10 (Australia) FW Archie Thompson; 11 (New Zealand) MF Marco Rojas (substituted off) 75'; 13 (Australia) MF Diogo Ferreira; 14 (Australia) MF Billy Celeski; 23 (Australia) DF Adrian Leijer (c); Substitutes: 01 (Australia) GK Tando Velaphi; 08 (Mauritius) MF Jonathan Bru (substituted on) 75'; 17 (Australia) MF James Jeggo (substituted on) 59'; 26 (Australia) FW Andrew Nabbout (substituted on) 75'	M. Rojas 23', 49'; M. Flores 38'	(2–0); Summary; Report	(yellow card) 12' M. Boxall; 81', 90' J. Brockie	Attendance: 20,683; Referee: (Australia) Shaun Evans Wellington Starting XI: 01 (New Zealand) GK Mark Paston; 02 (Malta) MF Manny Muscat; 03 (New Zealand) DF Tony Lochhead; 05 (New Zealand) DF Michael Boxall; 06 (United States) MF Alex Smith; 07 (New Zealand) MF Leo Bertos; 08 (Barbados) FW Paul Ifill (substituted off) 56'; 10 (Belgium) FW Stein Huysegems (substituted off) 56'; 11 (New Zealand) MF Jeremy Brockie; 16 (New Zealand) MF Louis Fenton (substituted off) 65'; 22 (Australia) DF Andrew Durante (c); Substitutes: 20 (New Zealand) GK Glen Moss; 09 (Solomon Islands) FW Benjamin Totori (substituted on) 56'; 12 (New Zealand) FW Tyler Boyd (substituted on) 56'; 17 (Australia) MF Vince Lia (substituted on) 65'

11 November 2012 Round 6	Wellington Phoenix	0–1	Central Coast Mariners	Westpac Stadium, Wellington
16:30 NZDT; 14:30 AEDT Wellington Starting XI: 01 (New Zealand) GK Mark Paston; 02 (Malta) MF Manny Muscat; 03 (New Zealand) DF Tony Lochhead (substituted off) 72'; 06 (United States) MF Alex Smith; 07 (New Zealand) MF Leo Bertos; 08 (Barbados) FW Paul Ifill (substituted off) 86'; 10 (Belgium) FW Stein Huysegems (substituted off) 71'; 11 (New Zealand) MF Jeremy Brockie; 16 (New Zealand) MF Louis Fenton; 18 (New Zealand) DF Ben Sigmund; 22 (Australia) DF Andrew Durante (c); Substitutes: 20 (New Zealand) GK Glen Moss; 09 (Solomon Islands) FW Benjamin Totori (substituted on) 71'; 12 (New Zealand) FW Tyler Boyd (substituted on) 86'; 17 (Australia) MF Vince Lia (substituted on) 72'	B. Sigmund (yellow card) 58'; M. Muscat (yellow card) 66'	(0–0); Summary	67' D. McBreen; (yellow card) 79' B. Ibini-Isei	Attendance: 6,568; Referee: (Australia) Lucien Laverdure Central Coast Starting XI: 01 (Australia) GK Mathew Ryan; 02 (Australia) FW Daniel McBreen; 03 (Australia) DF Joshua Rose; 04 (Australia) DF Pedj Bojić; 06 (Netherlands) DF Patrick Zwaanswijk; 07 (Malta) MF John Hutchinson (c); 10 (Australia) FW Tom Rogić (substituted off) 87'; 14 (New Zealand) MF Michael McGlinchey; 16 (Australia) DF Trent Sainsbury; 18 (Scotland) MF Nick Montgomery; 21 (Australia) FW Mile Sterjovski (substituted off) 63'; Substitutes: 20 (Australia) GK Justin Pasfield; 05 (Australia) DF Zachary Anderson; 09 (Australia) FW Bernie Ibini-Isei (substituted on) 63'; 12 (Australia) MF Troy Hearfield (substituted on) 87'

18 November 2012 Round 7	Newcastle Jets	0–3	Wellington Phoenix	Hunter Stadium, Newcastle
15:00 AEDT; 17:00 NZDT Newcastle Starting XI: 20 (Australia) GK Mark Birighitti (substituted off) 68'; 02 (Australia) DF Scott Neville; 03 (Brazil) DF Tiago; 04 (Australia) DF Josh Mitchell; 07 (Australia) MF James Brown (substituted off) 81'; 08 (Australia) MF Ruben Zadkovich; 09 (England) FW Emile Heskey; 12 (Australia) MF Joshua Brillante; 16 (Australia) MF Jobe Wheelhouse (c); 17 (Australia) FW James Virgili (substituted off) 58'; 23 (Australia) FW Ryan Griffiths; Substitutes: 33 (Australia) GK Matthew Nash (substituted on) 68'; 11 (Australia) DF Connor Chapman; 19 (England) FW Michael Bridges (substituted on) 81'; 22 (Australia) FW Adam Taggart (substituted on) 58'	J. Mitchell (yellow card) 86'	(0–1); Summary; Report; Statistics	44', 81' J. Brockie; (yellow card) 51' L. Fenton; 87' (pen.) P. Ifill	Attendance: 13,116; Referee: (Australia) Chris Beath Wellington Starting XI: 01 (New Zealand) GK Mark Paston; 02 (Malta) MF Manny Muscat; 03 (New Zealand) DF Tony Lochhead; 06 (United States) MF Alex Smith; 07 (New Zealand) MF Leo Bertos; 08 (Barbados) FW Paul Ifill (substituted off) 90+6'; 11 (New Zealand) MF Jeremy Brockie (substituted off) 90+6'; 16 (New Zealand) MF Louis Fenton (substituted off) 79'; 17 (Australia) MF Vince Lia; 18 (New Zealand) DF Ben Sigmund; 22 (Australia) DF Andrew Durante (c); Substitutes: 20 (New Zealand) GK Glen Moss; 09 (Solomon Islands) FW Benjamin Totori (substituted on) 79'; 12 (New Zealand) FW Tyler Boyd (substituted on) 90+6'; 28 (Panama) FW Ricardo Clarke (substituted on) 90+6'

24 November 2012 Round 8	Perth Glory	1–1	Wellington Phoenix	nib Stadium, Perth
18:45 AWST; 23:45 NZDT Perth Starting XI: 01 (Australia) GK Danny Vukovic; 04 (Republic of Ireland) FW Billy Mehmet; 05 (Australia) DF Steve Pantelidis; 06 (Australia) MF Nick Ward (substituted off) 60'; 07 (Australia) MF Jacob Burns (c); 09 (New Zealand) FW Shane Smeltz; 10 (Republic of Ireland) MF Liam Miller; 13 (Australia) MF Travis Dodd; 19 (Australia) DF Joshua Risdon; 21 (Australia) DF Scott Jamieson; 23 (Australia) DF Michael Thwaite; Substitutes: 30 (Australia) GK Lewis Italiano; 11 (Australia) MF Adrian Zahra; 14 (Scotland) FW Steven McGarry; 17 (Australia) FW Chris Harold (substituted on) 60'	S. Smeltz 62'; J. Burns (yellow card) 66'; L. Miller (yellow card) 90'	(0–0); Summary; Report; Statistics	(yellow card) 37' V. Lia; (yellow card) 43' B. Sigmund; 73' J. Brockie; (yellow card) 81' A. Durante	Attendance: 7,982; Referee: (Australia) Strebre Delovski Wellington Starting XI: 01 (New Zealand) GK Mark Paston; 02 (Malta) MF Manny Muscat; 03 (New Zealand) DF Tony Lochhead; 06 (United States) MF Alex Smith; 07 (New Zealand) MF Leo Bertos; 08 (Barbados) FW Paul Ifill (substituted off) 84'; 11 (New Zealand) MF Jeremy Brockie; 16 (New Zealand) MF Louis Fenton (substituted off) 79'; 17 (Australia) MF Vince Lia; 18 (New Zealand) DF Ben Sigmund; 22 (Australia) DF Andrew Durante (c); Substitutes: 20 (New Zealand) GK Glen Moss; 10 (Belgium) FW Stein Huysegems (substituted on) 84'; 12 (New Zealand) FW Tyler Boyd (substituted on) 79'; 28 (Panama) FW Ricardo Clarke

2 December 2012 Round 9	Wellington Phoenix	1–0	West Sydney Wanderers	Westpac Stadium, Wellington
16:30 NZDT; 14:30 AEDT Wellington Starting XI: 01 (New Zealand) GK Mark Paston; 02 (Malta) MF Manny Muscat; 03 (New Zealand) DF Tony Lochhead; 06 (United States) MF Alex Smith (substituted off) 76'; 07 (New Zealand) MF Leo Bertos; 08 (Barbados) FW Paul Ifill; 10 (Belgium) FW Stein Huysegems (substituted off) 85'; 11 (New Zealand) MF Jeremy Brockie; 17 (Australia) MF Vince Lia; 18 (New Zealand) DF Ben Sigmund; 22 (Australia) DF Andrew Durante (c); Substitutes: 30 (Australia) GK Griffin McMaster; 09 (Solomon Islands) FW Benjamin Totori; 12 (New Zealand) FW Tyler Boyd (substituted on) 85'; 16 (New Zealand) MF Louis Fenton (substituted on) 76'	J. Brockie 22'; M. Muscat (yellow card) 82'	(1–0); Summary; Report; Statistics		Attendance: 5,405; Referee: (Australia) Matthew Gillett Wanderers Starting XI: 01 (Australia) GK Ante Čović; 03 (Australia) DF Adam D'Apuzzo; 04 (Australia) DF Nikolai Topor-Stanley; 05 (Australia) DF Michael Beauchamp (c) (substituted off) 85'; 06 (Germany) MF Jérome Polenz; 08 (Croatia) MF Mateo Poljak; 09 (Croatia) FW Dino Kresinger (substituted off) 59'; 12 (Australia) FW Tahj Minniecon; 18 (Italy) DF Iacopo La Rocca (substituted off) 69'; 19 (Australia) FW Mark Bridge; 21 (Japan) MF Shinji Ono; Substitutes: 20 (Australia) GK Jerrad Tyson; 02 (Australia) DF Shannon Cole (substituted on) 85'; 13 (Australia) FW Joey Gibbs (substituted on) 59'; 23 (Australia) MF Jason Trifiro (substituted on) 69'

9 December 2012 Round 10	Wellington Phoenix	1–2	Sydney FC	Westpac Stadium, Wellington
16:30 NZDT; 14:30 AEDT Wellington Starting XI: 01 (New Zealand) GK Mark Paston; 02 (Malta) MF Manny Muscat; 03 (New Zealand) DF Tony Lochhead; 06 (United States) MF Alex Smith (substituted off) 54'; 07 (New Zealand) MF Leo Bertos; 08 (Barbados) FW Paul Ifill (substituted off) 71'; 10 (Belgium) FW Stein Huysegems (substituted off) 54'; 11 (New Zealand) MF Jeremy Brockie; 17 (Australia) MF Vince Lia; 18 (New Zealand) DF Ben Sigmund; 22 (Australia) DF Andrew Durante (c); Substitutes: 30 (Australia) GK Griffin McMaster; 09 (Solomon Islands) FW Benjamin Totori (substituted on) 71'; 12 (New Zealand) FW Tyler Boyd (substituted on) 54'; 16 (New Zealand) MF Louis Fenton (substituted on) 54'	J. Brockie (yellow card) 9' (goal) 90+2' (pen.); L. Bertos (yellow card) 74'	(0–1); Summary; Report; Statistics	(yellow card) 13' (yellow-red card) 86' T. McFlynn; (yellow card) 38' B. Powell; 45+1' S. Ryall; 70' R. Grant; (yellow card) 77' A. Al-Hilfi; (yellow card) 90+1' A. Griffiths	Attendance: 7,375; Referee: (Australia) Kris Griffiths-Jones Sydney Starting XI: 20 (Australia) GK Vedran Janjetović; 02 (Australia) DF Sebastian Ryall; 03 (Brazil) DF Fabio Alves; 04 (Netherlands) DF Pascal Bosschaart; 06 (Australia) MF Jason Culina (substituted off) 61'; 08 (Australia) MF Adam Griffiths; 12 (Australia) FW Blake Powell (substituted off) 88'; 15 (Northern Ireland) MF Terry McFlynn (c); 21 (Panama) FW Yairo Yau; 22 (Iraq) MF Ali Abbas; 23 (Australia) MF Rhyan Grant (substituted off) 77'; Substitutes: 01 (Australia) GK Ivan Necevski; 09 (Australia) MF Paul Reid (substituted on) 61'; 14 (Australia) FW Mitchell Mallia (substituted on) 77'; 24 (Australia) MF Hagi Gligor (substituted on) 88'

16 December 2012 Round 11	Adelaide United	3–1	Wellington Phoenix	Hindmarsh Stadium, Adelaide
16:30 AEDT; 19:00 NZDT Adelaide Starting XI: 01 (Australia) GK Eugene Galeković (c); 02 (Australia) DF Osama Malik; 03 (Australia) DF Nigel Boogaard; 05 (Australia) DF Iain Fyfe; 06 (Brazil) DF Cássio; 08 (Argentina) MF Marcelo Carrusca; 10 (Australia) MF Dario Vidošić (substituted off) 76'; 11 (Australia) FW Bruce Djite (substituted off) 63'; 14 (Australia) MF Cameron Watson; 22 (Portugal) MF Fábio Ferreira; 23 (Australia) FW Evan Kostopoulos (substituted off) 69'; Substitutes: 30 (Australia) GK John Hall; 17 (Australia) MF Iain Ramsay (substituted on) 69'; 18 (Australia) MF Fabian Barbiero (substituted on) 76'; 21 (Argentina) FW Jerónimo Neumann (substituted on) 63'	M. Carrusca 19', 24' (yellow card) 32'; F. Ferreira 45+2'	(3–0); Summary; Report	(yellow card) 16' M. Muscat; (yellow card) 33' P. Ifill; (yellow card) 80' B. Sigmund; 81' D. Sánchez	Attendance: 8,657; Referee: (Australia) Strebre Delovski Wellington Starting XI: 01 (New Zealand) GK Mark Paston; 02 (Malta) MF Manny Muscat; 03 (New Zealand) DF Tony Lochhead; 07 (New Zealand) MF Leo Bertos; 08 (Barbados) FW Paul Ifill (substituted off) 62'; 10 (Belgium) FW Stein Huysegems (substituted off) 68'; 16 (New Zealand) MF Louis Fenton; 17 (Australia) MF Vince Lia; 18 (New Zealand) DF Ben Sigmund; 21 (Spain) MF Dani Sánchez; 22 (Australia) DF Andrew Durante (c) (substituted off) 46'; Substitutes: 30 (Australia) GK Griffin McMaster; 06 (United States) MF Alex Smith (substituted on) 46'; 09 (Solomon Islands) FW Benjamin Totori (substituted on) 68'; 12 (New Zealand) FW Tyler Boyd (substituted on) 62'

22 December 2012 Round 12	Wellington Phoenix	1–1	Central Coast Mariners	Westpac Stadium, Wellington
17:00 NZDT; 15:00 AEDT Wellington Starting XI: 01 (New Zealand) GK Mark Paston; 02 (Malta) MF Manny Muscat; 03 (New Zealand) DF Tony Lochhead; 07 (New Zealand) MF Leo Bertos; 11 (New Zealand) MF Jeremy Brockie (substituted off) 71'; 12 (New Zealand) FW Tyler Boyd (substituted off) 77'; 16 (New Zealand) MF Louis Fenton; 17 (Australia) MF Vince Lia (substituted off) 70'; 18 (New Zealand) DF Ben Sigmund; 21 (Spain) MF Dani Sánchez; 22 (Australia) DF Andrew Durante (c); Substitutes: 30 (Australia) GK Griffin McMaster; 06 (United States) MF Alex Smith (substituted on) 70'; 09 (Solomon Islands) FW Benjamin Totori (substituted on) 71'; 10 (Belgium) FW Stein Huysegems (substituted on) 77'	V. Lia (yellow card) 31'; D. Sánchez 84'	(0–1); Summary; Report; Statistics	(yellow card) 39' P. Bojić; 45' D. McBreen; (yellow card) 69' J. Rose	Attendance: 5,961; Referee: (New Zealand) Peter O'Leary Central Coast Starting XI: 01 (Australia) GK Mathew Ryan; 02 (Australia) FW Daniel McBreen (substituted off) 90+3'; 03 (Australia) DF Joshua Rose; 04 (Australia) DF Pedj Bojić; 06 (Netherlands) DF Patrick Zwaanswijk; 07 (Malta) MF John Hutchinson (c); 09 (Australia) FW Bernie Ibini-Isei (substituted off) 68'; 10 (Australia) FW Tom Rogić (substituted off) 77'; 14 (New Zealand) MF Michael McGlinchey; 16 (Australia) DF Trent Sainsbury; 18 (Scotland) MF Nick Montgomery; Substitutes: 20 (Australia) GK Justin Pasfield; 05 (Australia) DF Zachary Anderson (substituted on) 90+3'; 19 (Australia) FW Mitchell Duke (substituted on) 77'; 24 (Australia) FW Mile Sterjovski (substituted on) 68'

27 December 2012 Round 13	Wellington Phoenix	3–2	Melbourne Heart	Westpac Stadium, Wellington
19:30 NZDT; 17:30 AEDT Wellington Starting XI: 01 (New Zealand) GK Mark Paston; 02 (Malta) MF Manny Muscat; 03 (New Zealand) DF Tony Lochhead; 07 (New Zealand) MF Leo Bertos (substituted off) 75'; 11 (New Zealand) MF Jeremy Brockie; 12 (New Zealand) FW Tyler Boyd; 16 (New Zealand) MF Louis Fenton; 17 (Australia) MF Vince Lia (substituted off) 84'; 18 (New Zealand) DF Ben Sigmund; 21 (Spain) MF Dani Sánchez; 22 (Australia) DF Andrew Durante (c); Substitutes: 30 (Australia) GK Griffin McMaster; 06 (United States) MF Alex Smith (substituted on) 84'; 09 (Solomon Islands) FW Benjamin Totori (substituted on) 75'; 10 (Belgium) FW Stein Huysegems	V. Lia (yellow card) 9'; A. Durante (yellow card) 13'; L. Fenton 21'; J. Brockie 66' (pen.), 71'; B. Totori (yellow card) 90'	(1–2); Summary; Report; Statistics	(yellow card) 7' S. Gray; 14' G. Mebrahtu; 16' (o.g.) A. Durante; (yellow card) 37' D. Vrankovic; (yellow card) 90' Fred	Attendance: 6,401; Referee: (Australia) Shaun Evans Melbourne Starting XI: 01 (Australia) GK Clint Bolton; 02 (Australia) DF Michael Marrone; 05 (Brazil) MF Fred (c); 08 (Australia) FW Matt Thompson; 10 (Croatia) FW Josip Tadić; 14 (Australia) FW Golgol Mebrahtu (substituted off) 84'; 15 (Australia) FW David Williams (substituted off) 67'; 17 (Australia) MF Jason Hoffman (substituted off) 73'; 18 (Australia) DF David Vranković; 21 (Republic of Ireland) DF Steven Gray; 24 (Australia) DF Sam Mitchinson; Substitutes: 20 (Australia) GK Andrew Redmayne; 09 (Australia) FW Dylan Macallister (substituted on) 73'; 13 (Argentina) MF Jonatan Germano (substituted on) 84'; 26 (Australia) MF Ersin Kaya (substituted on) 67'

1 January 2013 Round 14	Brisbane Roar	2–1	Wellington Phoenix	Suncorp Stadium, Brisbane
19:30 AEST; 22:30 NZDT Brisbane Starting XI: 01 (Australia) GK Michael Theo; 02 (Australia) DF Matt Smith (c); 03 (Australia) DF Shane Stefanutto; 05 (Australia) DF Ivan Franjic; 06 (Australia) DF Erik Paartalu; 07 (Albania) FW Besart Berisha; 10 (Brazil) FW Henrique (substituted off) 59'; 11 (Australia) MF Ben Halloran (substituted off) 87'; 15 (Australia) DF James Donachie; 17 (Australia) MF Mitch Nichols; 22 (Germany) MF Thomas Broich; Substitutes: 20 (Australia) GK Matt Acton; 04 (Australia) DF Matthew Jurman (substituted on) 87'; 08 (Australia) MF Massimo Murdocca; 24 (Australia) FW Nicholas Fitzgerald (substituted on) 59'	B. Berisha 14' (yellow card) 75'; J. Donachie (yellow card) 40' (yellow-red card) 85'; E. Paartalu (yellow card) 42'; B. Halloran 59'	(1–1); Summary; Report; Statistics	(yellow card) 45' (yellow-red card) 64' T. Boyd; 37' J. Brockie	Attendance: 11,358; Referee: (Australia) Tim McGilchrist Wellington Starting XI: 01 (New Zealand) GK Mark Paston; 02 (Malta) MF Manny Muscat (substituted off) 76'; 03 (New Zealand) DF Tony Lochhead; 07 (New Zealand) MF Leo Bertos; 11 (New Zealand) MF Jeremy Brockie; 12 (New Zealand) FW Tyler Boyd; 16 (New Zealand) MF Louis Fenton (substituted off) 70'; 17 (Australia) MF Vince Lia; 18 (New Zealand) DF Ben Sigmund; 21 (Spain) MF Dani Sánchez (substituted off) 68'; 22 (Australia) DF Andrew Durante (c); Substitutes: 30 (Australia) GK Griffin McMaster; 06 (United States) MF Alex Smith (substituted on) 76'; 09 (Solomon Islands) FW Benjamin Totori (substituted on) 68'; 10 (Belgium) FW Stein Huysegems (substituted on) 70'

5 January 2013 Round 15	Melbourne Victory	2–0	Wellington Phoenix	AAMI Park, Melbourne
19:45 AEDT; 21:45 NZDT Melbourne Starting XI: 39 (Australia) GK Nathan Coe; 03 (Ivory Coast) DF Adama Traoré; 05 (Australia) DF Mark Milligan; 09 (Argentina) MF Marcos Flores; 10 (Australia) FW Archie Thompson; 11 (New Zealand) MF Marco Rojas (substituted off) 85'; 13 (Australia) MF Diogo Ferreira; 14 (Australia) MF Billy Celeski (substituted off) 70'; 21 (Australia) DF Spase Dilevski (substituted off) 60'; 23 (Australia) DF Adrian Leijer (c); 24 (Australia) DF Nicolas Ansell; Substitutes: 01 (Australia) GK Tando Velaphi; 06 (Australia) MF Leigh Broxham (substituted on) 60'; 17 (Australia) MF Luke O'Dea (substituted on) 70'; 26 (Australia) FW Andrew Nabbout (substituted on) 85'	M. Flores 42'; N. Ansell (yellow card) 45'; M. Rojas 52'; B. Celeski (yellow card) 65'	(1–0); Summary; Report; Statistics	(yellow card) 23' L. Fenton; (yellow card) 68' L. Bertos	Attendance: 18,609; Referee: (Australia) Ben Williams Wellington Starting XI: 01 (New Zealand) GK Mark Paston; 03 (New Zealand) DF Tony Lochhead; 07 (New Zealand) MF Leo Bertos; 09 (Solomon Islands) FW Benjamin Totori; 10 (Belgium) FW Stein Huysegems (substituted off) 69'; 11 (New Zealand) MF Jeremy Brockie; 16 (New Zealand) MF Louis Fenton (substituted off) 77'; 17 (Australia) MF Vince Lia; 18 (New Zealand) DF Ben Sigmund; 21 (Spain) MF Dani Sánchez; 22 (Australia) DF Andrew Durante (c); Substitutes: 30 (Australia) GK Griffin McMaster; 05 (New Zealand) DF Michael Boxall; 06 (United States) MF Alex Smith (substituted on) 77'; 15 (New Zealand) MF Cameron Lindsay (substituted on) 69'

13 January 2013 Round 16	Wellington Phoenix	0–2	West Sydney Wanderers	Westpac Stadium, Wellington
16:30 NZDT; 14:30 AEDT Wellington Starting XI: 01 (New Zealand) GK Mark Paston; 03 (New Zealand) DF Tony Lochhead (substituted off) 80'; 07 (New Zealand) MF Leo Bertos; 10 (Belgium) FW Stein Huysegems; 11 (New Zealand) MF Jeremy Brockie; 12 (New Zealand) FW Tyler Boyd (substituted off) 64'; 16 (New Zealand) MF Louis Fenton; 17 (Australia) MF Vince Lia (substituted off) 74'; 18 (New Zealand) DF Ben Sigmund; 21 (Spain) MF Dani Sánchez; 22 (Australia) DF Andrew Durante (c); Substitutes: 30 (Australia) GK Griffin McMaster; 06 (United States) MF Alex Smith (substituted on) 74'; 09 (Solomon Islands) FW Benjamin Totori (substituted on) 64'; 15 (New Zealand) MF Cameron Lindsay (substituted on) 80'	D. Sánchez (yellow card) 68'; V. Lia (yellow card) 70'	(0–0); Summary; Report; Statistics	(yellow card) 33' I. La Rocca; (yellow card) 68' M. Beauchamp; 71' N. Topor-Stanley; 82' L. Haliti	Attendance: 6,608; Referee: (Australia) Shaun Evans Wanderers Starting XI: 01 (Australia) GK Ante Čović; 03 (Australia) DF Adam D'Apuzzo (substituted off) 70'; 04 (Australia) DF Nikolai Topor-Stanley; 05 (Australia) DF Michael Beauchamp (c); 06 (Germany) MF Jérome Polenz; 07 (Australia) FW Labinot Haliti; 08 (Croatia) MF Mateo Poljak; 10 (Australia) MF Aaron Mooy (substituted off) 76'; 17 (Netherlands) MF Youssouf Hersi (substituted off) 79'; 18 (Italy) DF Iacopo La Rocca; 19 (Australia) FW Mark Bridge; Substitutes: 20 (Australia) GK Jerrad Tyson; 02 (Australia) DF Shannon Cole (substituted on) 70'; 14 (Australia) FW Kwabena Appiah-Kubi (substituted on) 79'; 21 (Japan) MF Shinji Ono (substituted on) 76'

19 January 2013 Round 17	Sydney FC	7–1	Wellington Phoenix	Allianz Stadium, Sydney
17:30 AEDT; 19:30 NZDT Sydney Starting XI: 20 (Australia) GK Vedran Janjetović; 02 (Australia) DF Sebastian Ryall; 03 (Brazil) DF Fabio Alves; 06 (Australia) MF Jason Culina; 07 (Australia) MF Brett Emerton; 10 (Italy) FW Alessandro Del Piero (substituted off) 82'; 13 (Brazil) DF Tiago (substituted off) 56'; 15 (Northern Ireland) MF Terry McFlynn (c); 22 (Iraq) MF Ali Abbas; 23 (Australia) MF Rhyan Grant; 29 (Australia) FW Joel Griffiths (substituted off) 65'; Substitutes: 33 (Australia) GK Matthew Nash; 12 (Australia) FW Blake Powell (substituted on) 82'; 18 (Australia) MF Trent McClenahan (substituted on) 56'; 21 (Panama) FW Yairo Yau (substituted on) 65'	J. Griffiths 11'; A. Del Piero 21', 23' (pen.), 39', 70'; J. Culina 26'; A. Abbas (yellow card) 68'; Y. Yau 84'	(5–0); Summary; Report; Statistics	(yellow card) 22' A. Durante; (yellow card) 38' V. Lia; (yellow card) 47' (goal) 80' B. Sigmund; (yellow card) 73' J. Brockie	Attendance: 12,691; Referee: (Australia) Kris Griffiths-Jones Wellington Starting XI: 01 (New Zealand) GK Mark Paston; 03 (New Zealand) DF Tony Lochhead; 06 (United States) MF Alex Smith; 07 (New Zealand) MF Leo Bertos; 10 (Belgium) FW Stein Huysegems (substituted off) 65'; 11 (New Zealand) MF Jeremy Brockie; 12 (New Zealand) FW Tyler Boyd; 17 (Australia) MF Vince Lia; 18 (New Zealand) DF Ben Sigmund; 21 (Spain) MF Dani Sánchez; 22 (Australia) DF Andrew Durante (c); Substitutes: 20 (New Zealand) GK Glen Moss; 08 (Barbados) FW Paul Ifill (substituted on) 65'; 09 (Solomon Islands) FW Benjamin Totori; 16 (New Zealand) MF Louis Fenton

27 January 2013 Round 18	Wellington Phoenix	1–1	Newcastle Jets	Westpac Stadium, Wellington
16:30 NZDT; 14:30 AEDT Wellington Starting XI: 01 (New Zealand) GK Mark Paston; 02 (Malta) MF Manny Muscat; 03 (New Zealand) DF Tony Lochhead; 07 (New Zealand) MF Leo Bertos; 08 (Barbados) FW Paul Ifill; 11 (New Zealand) MF Jeremy Brockie; 12 (New Zealand) FW Tyler Boyd (substituted off) 76'; 16 (New Zealand) MF Louis Fenton; 18 (New Zealand) DF Ben Sigmund; 21 (Spain) MF Dani Sánchez (substituted off) 82'; 22 (Australia) DF Andrew Durante (c); Substitutes: 20 (New Zealand) GK Glen Moss; 04 (Australia) MF Isaka Cernak (substituted on) 76'; 09 (Solomon Islands) FW Benjamin Totori (substituted on) 82'; 10 (Belgium) FW Stein Huysegems	L. Fenton 21'; T. Lochhead (yellow card) 36' (yellow-red card) 72'	(1–0); Summary; Report; Statistics	(yellow card) 18' S. Neville; (yellow card) 32' (yellow-red card) 54' S. Gallaway; 74' E. Heskey	Attendance: 6,429; Referee: (Australia) Ben Williams Newcastle Starting XI: 20 (Australia) GK Mark Birighitti; 02 (Australia) DF Scott Neville; 07 (Australia) MF James Brown (substituted off) 83'; 09 (England) FW Emile Heskey; 11 (Australia) DF Connor Chapman; 12 (Australia) MF Joshua Brillante; 13 (Australia) DF Sam Gallaway; 14 (Australia) DF Taylor Regan (substituted off) 90'; 15 (Australia) MF Craig Goodwin (substituted off) 54'; 16 (Australia) MF Jobe Wheelhouse (c); 23 (Australia) FW Ryan Griffiths; Substitutes: 30 (Australia) GK Jack Duncan; 03 (Australia) MF Zenon Caravella (substituted on) 83'; 17 (Australia) FW James Virgili (substituted on) 54'; 22 (Australia) FW Adam Taggart (substituted on) 90'

2 February 2013 Round 19	Wellington Phoenix	1–0	Perth Glory	Eden Park, Auckland
17:00 NZDT; 15:00 AEDT Wellington Starting XI: 01 (New Zealand) GK Mark Paston; 02 (Malta) MF Manny Muscat; 04 (Australia) MF Isaka Cernak; 07 (New Zealand) MF Leo Bertos (substituted off) 75'; 08 (Barbados) FW Paul Ifill; 10 (Belgium) FW Stein Huysegems (substituted off) 62'; 11 (New Zealand) MF Jeremy Brockie (substituted off) 88'; 14 (New Zealand) DF Ian Hogg; 17 (Australia) MF Vince Lia; 18 (New Zealand) DF Ben Sigmund; 22 (Australia) DF Andrew Durante (c); Substitutes: 20 (New Zealand) GK Glen Moss; 12 (New Zealand) FW Tyler Boyd (substituted on) 88'; 16 (New Zealand) MF Louis Fenton (substituted on) 62'; 21 (Spain) MF Dani Sánchez (substituted on) 75'	J. Brockie 42'; B. Sigmund (yellow card) 60'	(1–0); Summary; Report; Statistics	(yellow card) 85' S. Jamieson	Attendance: 11,566; Referee: (Australia) Adam Kersey Perth Starting XI: 01 (Australia) GK Danny Vukovic; 02 (Australia) DF Jack Clisby; 06 (Australia) MF Nick Ward (substituted off) 71'; 10 (Republic of Ireland) MF Liam Miller; 11 (Australia) MF Adrian Zahra (substituted off) 62'; 13 (Australia) MF Travis Dodd; 14 (Scotland) FW Steven McGarry; 17 (Australia) FW Chris Harold; 19 (Australia) DF Joshua Risdon; 21 (Australia) DF Scott Jamieson (substituted off) 86'; 23 (Australia) DF Michael Thwaite (c); Substitutes: 30 (Australia) GK Lewis Italiano; 05 (Australia) DF Steve Pantelidis (substituted on) 71'; 08 (Australia) DF Dean Heffernan (substituted on) 86'; 12 (Japan) FW Ryo Nagai (substituted on) 62'

7 February 2013 Round 20	Central Coast Mariners	5–0	Wellington Phoenix	Bluetongue Stadium, Gosford
19:00 AEDT; 21:00 NZDT Central Coast Starting XI: 01 (Australia) GK Mathew Ryan; 02 (Australia) FW Daniel McBreen; 03 (Australia) DF Joshua Rose; 04 (Australia) DF Pedj Bojić; 06 (Netherlands) DF Patrick Zwaanswijk (substituted off) 90'; 07 (Malta) MF John Hutchinson (c); 09 (Australia) FW Bernie Ibini-Isei; 14 (New Zealand) MF Michael McGlinchey (substituted off) 80'; 16 (Australia) DF Trent Sainsbury; 18 (Scotland) MF Nick Montgomery; 21 (Australia) FW Mile Sterjovski (substituted off) 70'; Substitutes: 20 (Australia) GK Justin Pasfield; 05 (Australia) DF Zachary Anderson (substituted on) 90'; 19 (Australia) FW Mitchell Duke (substituted on) 70'; 29 (Australia) FW Nicholas Fitzgerald (substituted on) 80'	P. Zwaanswijk (yellow card) 7'; B. Ibini-Isei 30', 86'; J. Hutchinson (yellow card) 32', (goal) 65'; D. McBreen 69'; M. Duke 89'	(1–0); Summary; Report; Statistics	(yellow card) 50' J. Brockie; (yellow card) 80' T. Boyd	Attendance: 6,774; Referee: (Australia) Kris Griffiths-Jones Wellington Starting XI: 01 (New Zealand) GK Mark Paston; 02 (Malta) MF Manny Muscat; 04 (Australia) MF Isaka Cernak; 05 (New Zealand) DF Michael Boxall; 08 (Barbados) FW Paul Ifill; 10 (Belgium) FW Stein Huysegems (substituted off) 61'; 11 (New Zealand) MF Jeremy Brockie (substituted off) 70'; 14 (New Zealand) DF Ian Hogg; 16 (New Zealand) MF Louis Fenton (substituted off) 78'; 17 (Australia) MF Vince Lia; 22 (Australia) DF Andrew Durante (c); Substitutes: 20 (New Zealand) GK Glen Moss; 09 (Solomon Islands) FW Benjamin Totori (substituted on) 70'; 12 (New Zealand) FW Tyler Boyd (substituted on) 61'; 21 (Spain) MF Dani Sánchez (substituted on) 78'

17 February 2013 Round 21	Brisbane Roar	2–0	Wellington Phoenix	Suncorp Stadium, Brisbane
17:00 AEDT; 19:00 NZDT Brisbane Starting XI: 01 (Australia) GK Michael Theo; 03 (Australia) DF Shane Stefanutto (c); 07 (Albania) FW Besart Berisha (substituted off) 90'; 08 (Australia) MF Massimo Murdocca (substituted off) 72'; 11 (Australia) MF Ben Halloran; 13 (Australia) DF Jade North (substituted off) 78'; 14 (Australia) DF Steven Lustica; 15 (Australia) DF James Donachie; 18 (Australia) MF Luke Brattan; 19 (Australia) DF Jack Hingert; 22 (Germany) MF Thomas Broich; Substitutes: 20 (Australia) GK Matt Acton; 09 (Netherlands) FW Stef Nijland (substituted on) 72'; 26 (Australia) DF Corey Brown (substituted on) 78'; 27 (Australia) FW Kwame Yeboah (substituted on) 90'	S. Lustica 33'; B. Berisha 49'	(1–0); Summary; Report; Statistics	(yellow card) 38' C. Gameiro; (yellow card) 74' B. Sigmund; (yellow card) 83' D. Sánchez	Attendance: 9,282; Referee: (Australia) Alan Milliner Wellington Starting XI: 20 (New Zealand) GK Glen Moss; 02 (Malta) MF Manny Muscat; 03 (New Zealand) DF Tony Lochhead; 04 (Australia) MF Isaka Cernak (substituted off) 26'; 08 (Barbados) FW Paul Ifill (substituted off) 62'; 12 (New Zealand) FW Tyler Boyd; 16 (New Zealand) MF Louis Fenton; 17 (Australia) MF Vince Lia; 18 (New Zealand) DF Ben Sigmund; 22 (Australia) DF Andrew Durante (c); 23 (Australia) FW Corey Gameiro; Substitutes: 01 (New Zealand) GK Mark Paston; 07 (New Zealand) MF Leo Bertos; 10 (Belgium) FW Stein Huysegems (substituted on) 62'; 21 (Spain) MF Dani Sánchez (substituted on) 26'

24 February 2013 Round 22	Wellington Phoenix	2–2	Adelaide United	Westpac Stadium, Wellington
16:30 NZDT; 14:30 AEDT	J. Brockie 31'; M. Muscat (yellow card) 4'; C. Gameiro 80'	(1–2); Summary; Report; Statistics	(yellow card) 6' (yellow-red card) 68' J. McKain; (yellow card) 9' O. Malik; 20' T. Juric; 34' M. Carrusca; (yellow card) 80' N. Boogaard	Attendance: 4,832; Referee: (Australia) Tim McGilchrist

(Note: Match rescheduled from 23 March 2013 due to clash with FIFA World Cup qualifying matches) 27 February 2013 Round 26	Wellington Phoenix	1–2	Newcastle Jets	Westpac Stadium, Wellington
19:00 NZDT; 17:00 AEDT	J. Brockie (yellow card) 24' (goal) 60'; P. Ifill (yellow card) 44'; C. Gameiro (yellow card) 81'; M. Muscat (yellow card) 90'	(0–2); Summary; Report; Statistics	(yellow card) 10' Z. Caravella; 19' A. Taggart; 44' M. Bridges; (yellow card) 54' E. Heskey; (yellow card) 90' A. Hoole; (yellow card) 90' M. Birighitti	Attendance: 4,025; Referee: (Australia) Kris Griffiths-Jones

3 March 2013 Round 23	Wellington Phoenix	1–0	Melbourne Heart	Forsyth Barr Stadium, Dunedin
16:30 NZDT; 14:30 AEDT	J. Brockie 19'; S. Huysegems (yellow card) 45' (yellow-red card) 85'; C. Gameiro (yellow card) 59'; D. Sánchez (yellow card) 90+1'	(1–0); Summary; Report; Statistics	(yellow card) 6' N. Kalmar	Attendance: 3,060; Referee: (Australia) Brenton Hayward

10 March 2013 Round 24	West Sydney Wanderers	2–1	Wellington Phoenix	Parramatta Stadium, Sydney
17:00 AEDT; 19:00 NZDT Wanderers Starting XI: 01 (Australia) GK Ante Čović; 03 (Australia) DF Adam D'Apuzzo; 04 (Australia) DF Nikolai Topor-Stanley; 05 (Australia) DF Michael Beauchamp (c); 06 (Germany) MF Jérome Polenz; 07 (Australia) FW Labinot Haliti (substituted off) 69'; 08 (Croatia) MF Mateo Poljak (substituted off) 90'; 10 (Australia) MF Aaron Mooy; 17 (Netherlands) MF Youssouf Hersi; 19 (Australia) FW Mark Bridge; 21 (Japan) MF Shinji Ono (substituted off) 46'; Substitutes: 20 (Australia) GK Jerrad Tyson; 09 (Croatia) FW Dino Kresinger (substituted on) 46'; 14 (Australia) FW Kwabena Appiah-Kubi (substituted on) 69'; 18 (Italy) DF Iacopo La Rocca (substituted on) 90'	S. Ono 8' (pen.); M. Bridge 49' (pen.); M. Poljak (yellow card) 85'	(1–1); Summary; Report; Statistics	22' J. Brockie; (yellow card) 54' A. Durante	Attendance: 15,809; Referee: (Australia) Strebre Delovski Wellington Starting XI: 20 (New Zealand) GK Glen Moss; 02 (Malta) MF Manny Muscat; 03 (New Zealand) DF Tony Lochhead; 07 (New Zealand) MF Leo Bertos; 08 (Barbados) FW Paul Ifill (substituted off) 82'; 11 (New Zealand) MF Jeremy Brockie; 17 (Australia) MF Vince Lia; 18 (New Zealand) DF Ben Sigmund; 21 (Spain) MF Dani Sánchez (substituted off) 82'; 22 (Australia) DF Andrew Durante (c); 23 (Australia) FW Corey Gameiro (substituted off) 69'; Substitutes: 01 (New Zealand) GK Mark Paston; 04 (Australia) MF Isaka Cernak (substituted on) 82'; 12 (New Zealand) FW Tyler Boyd (substituted on) 69'; 16 (New Zealand) MF Louis Fenton (substituted on) 82'

17 March 2013 Round 25	Perth Glory	1–2	Wellington Phoenix	nib Stadium, Perth
19:00 AEDT; 21:00 NZDT	L. Miller (yellow card) 53'; R. Nagai 76'	(0–1); Summary; Report; Stats	35' P. Ifill; (yellow card) 38' T. Lochhead; (yellow card) 55' A. Durante; (yellow card) 66' C. Gameiro; 67' S. Huysegems; (yellow card) 73' P. Ifill; (yellow card) 81' L. Bertos	Attendance: 6,360; Referee: (Australia) Jarred Gillett

31 March 2013 Round 27	Wellington Phoenix	2–3	Melbourne Victory	Westpac Stadium, Wellington
16:30 NZDT; 14:30 AEDT Wellington Starting XI: 01 (New Zealand) GK Mark Paston (c); 02 (Malta) MF Manny Muscat; 07 (New Zealand) MF Leo Bertos; 08 (Barbados) FW Paul Ifill (substituted off) 82'; 10 (Belgium) FW Stein Huysegems; 11 (New Zealand) MF Jeremy Brockie; 18 (New Zealand) DF Ben Sigmund; 21 (Spain) MF Dani Sánchez; 22 (Australia) DF Andrew Durante; 23 (Australia) FW Corey Gameiro (substituted off) 72'; 29 (New Zealand) DF Luke Rowe (substituted off) 90'; Substitutes: 30 (New Zealand) GK Scott Basalaj; 12 (New Zealand) FW Tyler Boyd (substituted on) 90'; 15 (New Zealand) MF Cameron Lindsay (substituted on) 72'; 16 (New Zealand) MF Louis Fenton (substituted on) 82'	M. Muscat (yellow card) 22'; A. Durante (yellow card) 44'; S. Huysegems 64'; J. Brockie 66'; B. Sigmund (yellow card) 75'; D. Sánchez (yellow card) 81'	(0–1); Summary; Report; Statistics	10' M. Rojas; (yellow card) 37' D. Mullen; (yellow card) 55' L. Broxham; 56' M. Flores; 83' A. Thompson	Attendance: 6,813; Referee: (Australia) Adam Kersey Melbourne Starting XI: 39 (Australia) GK Nathan Coe; 05 (Australia) DF Mark Milligan; 06 (Australia) MF Leigh Broxham (substituted off) 86'; 09 (Argentina) MF Marcos Flores (substituted off) 72'; 10 (Australia) FW Archie Thompson; 11 (New Zealand) MF Marco Rojas (substituted off) 78'; 23 (Australia) DF Adrian Leijer (c); 30 (Australia) DF Jason Geria; 31 (Australia) DF Scott Galloway; 32 (Australia) FW Connor Pain; 33 (Australia) DF Daniel Mullen; Substitutes: 01 (Australia) GK Tando Velaphi; 08 (Mauritius) MF Jonathan Bru (substituted on) 86'; 14 (Australia) MF Billy Celeski (substituted on) 72'; 27 (Australia) MF Christopher Cristaldo (substituted on) 78'

=== Results by round ===
Round	1	2	3	4	5	6	7	8	9	10	11	12	13	14	15	16	17	18	19	20	21	22	23	24	25	26	27
Ground	H	A	H	A	A	H	A	A	H	H	A	H	H	A	A	H	A	H	H	A	A	H	H	H	A	A	H
Result	W	D	D	L	L	L	W	D	W	L	L	D	W	L	L	L	L	D	W	L	L	D	L	W	L	W	L
Position	1	2	4	6	8	9	7	7	5	6	7	7	6	7	8	10	10	10	9	9	10	10	10	10	10	10	10

Source: Matches
A = Away; H = Home; W = Win; D = Draw; L = Loss

==== League table ====
Pos	Team	Pld	W	D	L	GF	GA	GD	Pts	Qualification
1	Western Sydney Wanderers	27	18	3	6	41	21	+20	57	Qualification for 2014 AFC Champions League group stage and finals series
2	Central Coast Mariners (C)	27	16	6	5	48	22	+26	54	Qualification for 2014 AFC Champions League group stage and finals series
3	Melbourne Victory	27	13	5	9	48	45	+3	44	Qualification for 2014 AFC Champions League qualifying play-off and finals series (Note: Since the winner of 2013 A-League Grand Final (Central Coast Mariners) qualified for the 2014 AFC Champions League group stage, the 3rd placed team qualified for the qualifying play-off of 2014 AFC Champions League.)
4	Adelaide United	27	12	5	10	38	37	+1	41	Qualification for Finals series
5	Brisbane Roar	27	10	5	12	33	29	+4	35	Qualification for Finals series
6	Perth Glory	27	9	5	13	29	31	−2	32	Qualification for Finals series
7	Sydney FC	27	9	5	13	41	51	−10	32	
8	Newcastle Jets	27	8	7	12	30	45	−15	31	
9	Melbourne Heart	27	8	3	16	31	40	−9	27	
10	Wellington Phoenix (Note: Wellington Phoenix cannot qualify for the AFC Champions League as they are not recognised as an AFC club.)	27	7	6	14	31	49	−18	27	

Updated to match(es) played on 30 March 2013. Source: ultimatealeague.com
Rules for classification: 1) points; 2) goal difference; 3) number of goals scored.
(C) Champions

== Statistics ==
=== Appearances ===
Rank	Player	Minutes Played																											Total				
Rank	Player	1	2	3	4	5	6	7	8	9	10	11	12	13	14	15	16	17	18	19	20	21	22	26	23	24	25	27	App.	GS	Substituted on	Substituted off	Min.
1	(Australia) Andrew Durante	90	90		90	90	90	90	90	90	90	(substituted off) 46	90	90	90	90	90	90	90	90	90	90	90	90	90	90	90	90	26	26	0	1	2,296
1	(New Zealand) Louis Fenton	(substituted off) 77	90	(substituted off) 70	(substituted off) 63	(substituted off) 65	90	(substituted off) 80	(substituted off) 79	(substituted on) 14	(substituted on) 35	90	90	90	(substituted off) 70	(substituted off) 77	90	(substituted on) 21	90	(substituted on) 28	(substituted off) 78	90	(substituted off) 81	(substituted off) 64	(substituted on) 6	(substituted on) 8		(substituted on) 8	26	19	7	11	1,644
3	(New Zealand) Ben Sigmund	90		90	76		90	90	90	90	90	90	90	90	90	90	90	90	90	90		90	90	90	90	90	90	90	24	24	0	0	2,146
3	(Malta) Manny Muscat	90	90	90	90	90	90	90	90	90	90	90	90	90	(substituted off) 76				90	90	90	90	90	90	90	90	90	90	24	24	0	1	2,146
3	(New Zealand) Leo Bertos	90		90	90	90	90	90	90	90	90	90	90	(substituted off) 75	(substituted off) 87	90	90	90	90	(substituted off) 75			90	90	90	90	90	90	24	24	0	2	2,127
3	(New Zealand) Jeremy Brockie	90		90	90	90	90	(substituted off) 89	90	90	90		(substituted off) 70	90	90	90	90	90	90	(substituted off) 88	(substituted off) 70		90	90	90	90	90	90	24	24	0	4	2,117
3	(New Zealand) Tyler Boyd	(substituted on) 13	(substituted on) 18	(substituted on) 20	(substituted on) 17	(substituted on) 34	(substituted on) 3	(substituted on) 1	(substituted on) 11	(substituted on) 5	(substituted on) 35	(substituted on) 29	(substituted off) 77	90	64		(substituted off) 64	90	(substituted off) 76	(substituted on) 2	(substituted on) 29	90	(substituted on) 9	(substituted on) 26		(substituted on) 21		(substituted on) 1	24	7	17	3	825
8	(New Zealand) Tony Lochhead	90		90	90	90	(substituted off) 74	90	90	90	90	90	90	90	90	90	(substituted off) 80	90	72			90	90	90	90	90	(substituted off) 63		23	23	0	3	1,999
8	(Australia) Vince Lia		90	(substituted on) 8	(substituted on) 39	(substituted on) 25	(substituted on) 16	90	90	90	90	90	(substituted off) 70	(substituted off) 84	90	90	(substituted off) 74	90		90	90	90	(substituted off) 75	(substituted off) 71	90	90			23	19	4	5	1,542
8	(Belgium) Stein Huysegems	(substituted off) 89	90	(substituted off) 61	(substituted off) 73	(substituted off) 56	(substituted off) 72		(substituted on) 8	(substituted off) 85	(substituted off) 55	(substituted off) 68	(substituted on) 13		(substituted on) 20	(substituted off) 68	90	(substituted off) 65		(substituted off) 62	(substituted off) 61	(substituted on) 28	(substituted on) 15	(substituted on) 10	85		(substituted off) 89	90	23	17	6	12	1,377
11	(Barbados) Paul Ifill	(substituted on) 29	90	90	90	(substituted off) 56	(substituted off) 87	(substituted off) 89	(substituted off) 82	90	(substituted off) 70	(substituted off) 61						(substituted on) 25	90	90	90	(substituted off) 62	90	(substituted off) 80	(substituted off) 84	(substituted off) 82	(substituted off) 82	(substituted off) 82	22	20	2	12	1,691
12	(New Zealand) Mark Paston	90		90	90	90	90	90	90	90	90	90	90	90	90	90	90	90	90	90	90							90	20	20	0	0	1,800
13	(United States) Alex Smith	90	90	(substituted off) 82	(substituted off) 51	90	90	90	90	(substituted off) 76	(substituted off) 55	(substituted on) 44	(substituted on) 20	(substituted on) 6	(substituted on) 14	(substituted on) 13	(substituted on) 16	90	90										18	12	6	4	1,097
14	(Spain) Dani Sánchez											90	90	90	(substituted off) 68	90	90	(substituted off) 69	(substituted off) 82	(substituted on) 15	(substituted on) 12	(substituted on) 64		(substituted on) 19	(substituted on) 25	(substituted off) 82	(substituted on) 1	90	16	10	6	4	973
15	(Solomon Islands) Benjamin Totori	(substituted off) 61		(substituted on) 29	(substituted on) 27	(substituted on) 34	(substituted on) 18	(substituted on) 10			(substituted on) 20	(substituted on) 22	(substituted on) 20	(substituted on) 15	(substituted on) 22	90	(substituted on) 26		(substituted on) 8		(substituted on) 20								15	2	13	1	422
16	(Australia) Corey Gameiro																					90	90	90	(substituted off) 65	(substituted off) 69	90	(substituted off) 72	7	7	0	3	566
17	(New Zealand) Glen Moss																					90	90	90	90	90	90		6	6	0	0	540
17	(Australia) Isaka Cernak																		(substituted on) 14	90	90	(substituted off) 26				(substituted on) 8	(substituted on) 27		6	3	3	1	255
19	(New Zealand) Michael Boxall		90	90		90															90								4	4	0	0	360
19	(New Zealand) Cameron Lindsay															(substituted on) 22	(substituted on) 10										(substituted on) 8	(substituted on) 18	4	0	4	0	58
21	(New Zealand) Ian Hogg																			90	90						90		3	3	0	0	270
22	(New Zealand) Luke Rowe		90																									(substituted off) 89	2	2	0	1	179
22	(Panama) Ricardo Clarke	(substituted on) 1						(substituted on) 1																					2	0	2	0	2
24	(New Zealand) Jacob Spoonley		90																										1	1	0	0	90
24	(New Zealand) Tom Biss		(substituted off) 82																										1	1	0	0	82
26	(Australia) Jimmy Downey																												0	0	0	0	0
26	(Australia) Lucas Pantelis																												0	0	0	0	0
26	(Australia) Mirjan Pavlovic																												0	0	0	0	0

*Left the field after succumbing to a head injury

Player started Player subbed in Player suspended Player injured/sick Player on international duty Player left club/not signed/loan expired

=== Goal scorers ===
Rank	Player	Goals by round																											Total
Rank	Player	1	2	3	4	5	6	7	8	9	10	11	12	13	14	15	16	17	18	19	20	21	22	26	23	24	25	27	Total
1	(New Zealand) Jeremy Brockie					2		2	1	1	1			2	1					1			1	1	1	1		1	16
2	(Belgium) Stein Huysegems	1		1	1																						1	1	5
3	(New Zealand) Louis Fenton	1												1					1										3
3	(Barbados) Paul Ifill		1					1																			1		3
5	(Spain) Dani Sánchez											1	1																2
6	(New Zealand) Ben Sigmund																	1											1
6	(Australia) Corey Gameiro																						1						1

Goal scored from penalty kick

=== Goal assists ===
Rank	Player	Assists by round																											Total
Rank	Player	1	2	3	4	5	6	7	8	9	10	11	12	13	14	15	16	17	18	19	20	21	22	26	23	24	25	27	Total
1	(Barbados) Paul Ifill				1			1										1		1					1			1	6
2	(United States) Alex Smith		1						1	1																			3
2	(Solomon Islands) Benjamin Totori					1		1					1																3
2	(Malta) Manny Muscat	2									1																		3
2	(New Zealand) Louis Fenton			1										1										1					3
6	(Spain) Dani Sánchez													1					1										2
6	(New Zealand) Jeremy Brockie																										2		2
6	(New Zealand) Leo Bertos																									1		1	2
9	(New Zealand) Tony Lochhead							1																					1
9	(New Zealand) Tyler Boyd											1																	1
9	(Australia) Vince Lia													1															1
9	(Australia) Andrew Durante														1														1
9	(Australia) Corey Gameiro																						1						1
9	(Belgium) Stein Huysegems																						1						1

Assist earned by winning penalty kick

=== Discipline ===
Rank	Player	Cards by round																											Total		
Rank	Player	1	2	3	4	5	6	7	8	9	10	11	12	13	14	15	16	17	18	19	20	21	22	26	23	24	25	27	Yellow card	Yellow-red card	Red card
1	(New Zealand) Ben Sigmund				Red card		Yellow card		Yellow card			Yellow card						Yellow card		Yellow card		Yellow card						Yellow card	7		1
2	(Malta) Manny Muscat		Yellow card				Yellow card			Yellow card		Yellow card											Yellow card	Yellow card				Yellow card	7		
2	(Australia) Andrew Durante				Yellow card				Yellow card					Yellow card				Yellow card								Yellow card	Yellow card	Yellow card	7		
4	(New Zealand) Jeremy Brockie	Yellow card			Yellow card						Yellow card							Yellow card			Yellow card			Yellow card					6		
5	(Australia) Vince Lia								Yellow card				Yellow card	Yellow card			Yellow card	Yellow card											5		
6	(New Zealand) Tyler Boyd														Yellow-red card						Yellow card								1	1	
6	(New Zealand) Louis Fenton			Yellow card	Yellow card			Yellow card								Yellow card													4		
6	(Australia) Corey Gameiro																					Yellow card		Yellow card	Yellow card		Yellow card		4		
6	(Spain) Dani Sánchez																Yellow card					Yellow card			Yellow card			Yellow card	4		
10	(New Zealand) Tony Lochhead																		Yellow-red card								Yellow card		1	1	
10	(New Zealand) Leo Bertos										Yellow card					Yellow card											Yellow card		3		
10	(Barbados) Paul Ifill											Yellow card												Yellow card			Yellow card		3		
13	(New Zealand) Michael Boxall		Yellow card			Yellow card																							2		
14	(United States) Alex Smith		Yellow card																										1		
14	(Solomon Islands) Benjamin Totori													Yellow card															1		
14	(Belgium) Stein Huysegems																								Yellow-red card				1		

Player suspended

=== Goal times ===
Times in which goals have been scored in the 2012–13 season
nth Min.	Goals for Wellington Phoenix	Goals against Wellington Phoenix
01-05	0	0
06-10	0	2
11–15	0	3
16–20	2	4
21–25	4	5
26–30	0	2
31–35	2	2
36–40	1	3
41–45	4	5
46–50	1	3
51–55	0	2
56–60	1	2
61–65	1	2
66–70	3	5
71–75	3	2
76–80	2	1
81–85	4	4
86–90	3	2

=== Home attendance ===
Date	Round	Attendance	Opposition	Stadium
6 October 2012	Round 1	12,057	Sydney FC	Westpac Stadium
21 October 2012	Round 3	9,182	Brisbane Roar	Westpac Stadium
11 November 2012	Round 6	6,568	Central Coast Mariners	Westpac Stadium
2 December 2012	Round 9	5,405	West Sydney Wanderers	Westpac Stadium
9 December 2012	Round 10	7,375	Sydney FC	Westpac Stadium
22 December 2012	Round 12	5,961	Central Coast Mariners	Westpac Stadium
27 December 2012	Round 13	6,401	Melbourne Heart	Westpac Stadium
13 January 2013	Round 16	6,608	West Sydney Wanderers	Westpac Stadium
27 January 2013	Round 18	6,429	Newcastle Jets	Westpac Stadium
2 February 2013	Round 19	11,566	Perth Glory	Eden Park
24 February 2013	Round 22	4,832	Adelaide United	Westpac Stadium
27 February 2013	Round 26	4,025	Newcastle Jets	Westpac Stadium
3 March 2013	Round 23	3,060	Melbourne Heart	Forsyth Barr Stadium
31 March 2013	Round 27	6,813	Melbourne Victory	Westpac Stadium
Total	96,282			
Average	6,877			

== Club ==
=== Technical staff ===
- First team coach: (New Zealand) Ricki Herbert (until 26 February 2013)
- Assistant coach: (England) Chris Greenacre
- Strength & conditioning coach: (England) Ed Baranowski
- Goalkeeping coach: (Scotland) Jonathan Gould
- Physiotherapist: Wayne Roberts
- Masseur: Dene Carroll

=== Kit ===
Home	Away

=== End-of-season awards ===
See also List of Wellington Phoenix FC end-of-season awards

- Sony Player of the Year: Andrew Durante
- Players' Player of the Year: Jeremy Brockie
- Under-23 Player of the Year: Louis Fenton
- Golden Boot: Jeremy Brockie – 16 goals
- Lloyd Morrison Spirit of the Phoenix Award: Ben Sigmund
