= 2013–14 Wellington Phoenix FC season =

Wellington Phoenix
2013–14 season
- Chairman: Rob Morrison
- Manager: Ernie Merrick
- Stadium: Westpac Stadium
- A-League: 9th
- Top goalscorer: Stein Huysegems (11)
- Highest home attendance: 18,056 vs Adelaide United; 2 February 2014
- Lowest home attendance: 6,339 vs Sydney FC; 22 December 2013
Home colours	Away colours

The 2013–14 Wellington Phoenix FC season was the club's seventh season since its formation in 2007. It competed in the A-League for the seventh time.

== Players ==
=== First-team squad ===
As of 6 March 2014.

Contracted Players
Note: Flags indicate national team as defined under FIFA eligibility rules; some limited exceptions apply. Players may hold more than one non-FIFA nationality.

No.	Pos.	Nation	Player
1	GK	NZL	Glen Moss
2	DF	MLT	Manny Muscat
3	DF	AUS	Reece Caira
4	DF	NZL	Luke Adams (Youth)
5	DF	NZL	Michael Boxall
6	DF	AUS	Josh Brindell-South (Youth)
7	MF	NZL	Leo Bertos
8	FW	BRB	Paul Ifill
9	FW	CRC	Kenny Cunningham
10	FW	BEL	Stein Huysegems
11	FW	NZL	Jeremy Brockie
12	FW	NZL	Tyler Boyd (Youth)
13	MF	ESP	Albert Riera
14	MF	NZL	Alex Rufer (Youth)

No.	Pos.	Nation	Player
15	MF	NZL	Jason Hicks
16	MF	NZL	Louis Fenton (Youth)
17	MF	AUS	Vince Lia
18	DF	NZL	Ben Sigmund (Vice Captain)
19	FW	NZL	Hamish Watson
20	GK	AUS	Lewis Italiano
21	MF	CRC	Carlos Hernández
22	DF	NZL	Andrew Durante (Captain)
23	MF	NZL	Matthew Ridenton (Youth)
24	FW	FIJ	Roy Krishna (injury cover)
25	DF	IRL	Shaun Timmins (injury cover)
25	FW	AUS	Miloš Lujić (international cover)
30	GK	NZL	Jacob Spoonley (short-term injury cover)
40	GK	NZL	James McPeake (international cover)

=== Reserve squad ===
Football School of Excellence players

Note: Flags indicate national team as defined under FIFA eligibility rules; some limited exceptions apply. Players may hold more than one non-FIFA nationality.

No.	Pos.	Nation	Player
32	MF	NZL	Justin Gulley
35	FW	NZL	Hamish Watson

No.	Pos.	Nation	Player
39	MF	GER	Tobias Bertsch

=== Contract extensions ===
No.	Pos.	Player	Contract extension	Expires (Season end)
7	MF	Leo Bertos	1 Year	2013–14
15	MF	Jason Hicks	2 Years	2014–15
2	DF	Manny Muscat	2 Years	2015–16
20	GK	Lewis Italiano	1 Year	2014–15
13	MF	Albert Riera	1 Year	2014–15
5	DF	Michael Boxall	1 Year	2014–15
17	MF	Vince Lia	2 Years	2015–16
24	FW	Roy Krishna	2 Years	2015–16

== Transfers ==
=== Winter ===
==== In ====
No.	Pos.	Player	From†	Date	Notes
19	MF	Carlos Hernández	United SC	13 February 2013	two-year contract
20	GK	Lewis Italiano	(Oakleigh Cannons)	18 June 2013	one-year contract
4	DF	Luke Adams	(Derby County)	14 July 2013	one-year contract
9	FW	Kenny Cunningham	(The Strongest)	26 July 2013	two-year contract
3	DF	Reece Caira	Western Sydney Wanderers	31 July 2013	two-year contract
14	MF	Alex Rufer	Wairarapa United	2 August 2013	three-year contract
6	DF	Josh Brindell-South	Moreton Bay United	18 September 2013	one-year contract
13	MF	Albert Riera	Auckland City	7 October 2013	one-year contract
30	GK	Jacob Spoonley	Team Wellington	10 October 2013	Injury cover (3–4 weeks)
25	MF	Jason Hicks	Team Wellington	10 October 2013	Injury cover (3–4 weeks)
40	GK	James McPeake	Team Wellington	10 October 2013	International cover (one week)
24	FW	Hamish Watson	Team Wellington	10 October 2013	International cover (one week)
23	MF	Matthew Ridenton	Auckland City	17 October 2013	three-year contract

† Brackets round club names indicate the player's contract with that club had expired before he joined Wellington Phoenix.

==== Out ====
No.	Pos.	Player	To†	Date	Notes
1	GK	Mark Paston	Retired	31 March 2013	
23	FW	Corey Gameiro	Fulham	31 March 2013	Loan Return
4	MF	Isaka Cernak	(Perth Glory)	24 April 2013	
14	DF	Ian Hogg	(Waitakere United)	24 April 2013	Contract Ended
6	MF	Alex Smith	(Oakleigh Cannons)	19 May 2013	
3	DF	Tony Lochhead	(Chivas USA)	9 June 2013	
21	MF	Dani Sánchez	(Tuen Mun)	9 June 2013	
19	MF	Jimmy Downey	Ballarat Red Devils	9 June 2013	
23	MF	Lucas Pantelis	Retired	9 June 2013	
9	FW	Benjamin Totori	Oakleigh Cannons	14 June 2013	
38	MF	Tom Doyle	(Team Wellington)	2 July 2013	Cut from FSE squad
29	DF	Luke Rowe	(Team Wellington)	27 July 2013	Cut from FSE squad
31	MF	Tom Biss	(Team Wellington)	27 July 2013	Cut from FSE squad
36	DF	Alec Solomons	(Waitakere United)	27 July 2013	Cut from FSE squad
15	MF	Cameron Lindsay	(Team Wellington)	25 September 2013	
35	GK	Scott Basalaj	Partick Thistle	26 September 2013	

† Brackets round a club denote the player joined that club after his Wellington Phoenix contract expired.

==== Loans out ====
No.	Pos.	Player	To†	Start Date	End Date
5	DF	Michael Boxall	Oakleigh Cannons	8 May 2013	2 September 2013
11	FW	Jeremy Brockie	Toronto FC	8 May 2013	26 August 2013
20	GK	Lewis Italiano	Oakleigh Cannons	18 June 2013	1 September 2013

=== Summer ===
==== In ====
No.	Pos.	Player	From†	Date	Notes
24	FW	Roy Krishna	Auckland City	7 January 2014	Injury cover (till end of season)
25	FW	Miloš Lujić	Northcote City	7 January 2014	International cover (2 weeks)
19	FW	Hamish Watson	Team Wellington	5 February 2014	Half-year contract
25	DF	Shaun Timmins	Green Gully	6 March 2014	Injury cover (till end of season)

== Technical staff ==
Position	Name
First team Coach	Ernie Merrick
Assistant coach	Chris Greenacre
Goalkeeping coach	Jonathan Gould
Strength & conditioning coach	Lee Spence
High-performance manager	Ed Baranowski
Physiotherapist	Wayne Roberts
Masseur	Dene Carroll

== Statistics ==
=== Appearances ===
Rank	Player	App.	GS	Substituted on	Substituted off
1	Vince Lia	27	27	0	2
2	Andrew Durante	26	26	0	0
2	Stein Huysegems	26	26	0	10
4	Glen Moss	25	25	0	0
4	Ben Sigmund	25	25	0	1
6	Manny Muscat	24	24	0	0
6	Jeremy Brockie	24	24	8	5
8	Kenny Cunningham	23	21	2	17
9	Jason Hicks	22	7	15	6
10	Carlos Hernández	21	20	1	8
11	Tyler Boyd	20	9	11	9
12	Albert Riera	17	13	4	4
13	Michael Boxall	16	14	2	0
14	Matthew Ridenton	13	5	8	4
15	Reece Caira	11	10	1	2
15	Paul Ifill	11	3	8	3
17	Louis Fenton	10	10	0	2
18	Roy Krishna	9	3	6	2
19	Leo Bertos	7	2	5	0
20	Shaun Timmins	6	5	1	0
21	Luke Adams	3	2	1	1
21	Josh Brindell-South	3	2	1	2
23	Jacob Spoonley	2	2	0	0
23	Hamish Watson	2	0	2	0
25	Alex Rufer	1	0	1	0

=== Goal scorers ===
Rank	Player	Total
1	Stein Huysegems	10
2	Kenny Cunningham	7
2	Carlos Hernández	7
4	Jeremy Brockie	5
5	Tyler Boyd	2
6	Andrew Durante	1
6	Paul Ifill	1
6	Roy Krishna	1
6	Jason Hicks	1

=== Discipline ===
Rank	Player	Total		
Rank	Player	Yellow card	Yellow-red card	Red card
1	Manny Muscat	9	1	
2	Kenny Cunningham	8		
3	Michael Boxall	7		
4	Andrew Durante	6		
4	Jeremy Brockie	6		
6	Ben Sigmund	5	1	
7	Albert Riera	4		
7	Carlos Hernández	4		
9	Louis Fenton	3		
9	Vince Lia	3		
11	Leo Bertos	2		
11	Roy Krishna	2		
13	Jacob Spoonley	1		
13	Tyler Boyd	1		
13	Shaun Timmins	1	1	
13	Matthew Ridenton	1		

== Pre-season and friendlies ==
16 July 2013	Wellington Olympic	0–4	Wellington Phoenix	Porirua Park, Porirua
		Report	(3) Huysegems; Biss

23 July 2013	Miramar Rangers	2–5	Wellington Phoenix	Porirua Park, Porirua
	Fa'arodo; McIntyre	Report	(2) Ifill (2) Huysegems; Gulley

30 July 2013	Lower Hutt City	3–3	Wellington Phoenix	Porirua Park, Porirua
		Report	(2) Ifill; Huysegems

1 August 2013	Petone	1–6	Wellington Phoenix	Petone Memorial Park, Lower Hutt
		Report	(4) Huysegems; Lindsay; Rufer

21 August 2013	Western Sydney Wanderers	2–1	Wellington Phoenix	Lily Homes Stadium, Sydney
Wednesday 19:15 AEDT	Šantalab 85', 90+3'	Report	81' Fenton	Attendance: 4,000; Referee: Kris Griffiths-Jones

24 August 2013	Newcastle Jets	0–1	Wellington Phoenix	Rockwell Automation Park, Weston
Saturday 16:30 AEDT		Report	7' Sigmund	Referee: Andrew Best

7 September 2013	Sydney FC	0–3	Wellington Phoenix	Winter Field, Sydney
Saturday 14:00 AEDT		Report	37' Cunningham; 75' H. Watson; 76' Ifill

14 September 2013	Capital Football Central Selection	1–2	Wellington Phoenix	Weka Park, Kāpiti Coast
Saturday 14:00 NZDT	Peverley (?)	Report	(2) Brockie

22 September 2013	New Zealand A	1–1	Wellington Phoenix	Rotorua International Stadium, Rotorua
Sunday 14:30 NZDT	Clapham 49'	Report	Huysegems 40'	Attendance: 3,553

28 September 2013	Auckland City	1–0	Wellington Phoenix	Kiwitea Street, Auckland
Saturday 14:00 NZDT	Burfoot 86'	Report		Referee: Nick Waldron

== Competitions ==
=== A-League ===
==== League table ====
Pos	Team	Pld	W	D	L	GF	GA	GD	Pts	Qualification
1	Brisbane Roar (C)	27	16	4	7	43	25	+18	52	Qualificaition for 2015 AFC Champions League group stage and finals series
2	Western Sydney Wanderers	27	11	9	7	34	29	+5	42	Qualificaition for 2015 AFC Champions League group stage and finals series
3	Central Coast Mariners	27	12	6	9	33	36	−3	42	Qualification for 2015 AFC Champions League qualifying play-off and finals series (Note: Since the winner of 2014 A-League Grand Final (Brisbane Roar) qualified for the 2015 AFC Champions League group stage, the 2nd and 3rd placed teams qualified for the group stage and the qualifying play-off of 2015 AFC Champions League.)
4	Melbourne Victory	27	11	8	8	42	43	−1	41	Qualification for Finals series
5	Sydney FC	27	12	3	12	40	38	+2	39	Qualification for Finals series
6	Adelaide United	27	10	8	9	45	36	+9	38	Qualification for Finals series
7	Newcastle Jets	27	10	6	11	34	34	0	36	
8	Perth Glory	27	7	7	13	28	37	−9	28	
9	Wellington Phoenix (Note: Wellington Phoenix cannot qualify for the AFC Champions League as they are not recognised as an AFC club.)	27	7	7	13	36	51	−15	28	
10	Melbourne Heart	27	6	8	13	36	42	−6	26	

Updated to match(es) played on 13 April 2014. Source: ultimatealeague.com
Rules for classification: 1) points; 2) goal difference; 3) number of goals scored.
(C) Champions

==== Results summary ====
Overall								Home						Away					
Pld	W	D	L	GF	GA	GD	Pts	W	D	L	GF	GA	GD	W	D	L	GF	GA	GD
27	7	7	13	36	51	−15	28	3	5	5	14	18	−4	4	2	8	22	33	−11

Last updated: 12 April 2014.
Source: ultimatealeague.com

==== Results by round ====
Round	1	2	3	4	5	6	7	8	9	10	11	12	13	14	15	16	17	18	19	20	21	22	23	24	25	26	27
Ground	H	A	H	A	H	A	H	A	H	A	H	A	A	H	H	A	H	A	H	A	A	H	A	A	H	A	H
Result	L	D	D	L	D	L	L	D	L	L	W	W	W	D	W	L	W	W	L	W	L	D	D	L	L	L	L
Position	8	8	8	9	9	9	9	9	9	9	9	9	9	9	9	9	8	6	7	7	7	8	8	8	8	9	9

Updated to match(es) played on 12 April 2014. Source: ultimatealeague.com
A = Away; H = Home; W = Win; D = Draw; L = Loss

==== Matches ====
13 October 2013 1	Wellington Phoenix	1–2	Brisbane Roar	Westpac Stadium, Wellington
Sunday 17:00 NZDT	Huysegems 22'	Report	47' Berisha; 90+2' Franjić	Attendance: 8,239; Referee: Tim McGilchrist

20 October 2013 2	Western Sydney Wanderers	1–1	Wellington Phoenix	Pirtek Stadium, Parramatta
Sunday, 17:00 AEDT; Sunday, 19:00 NZDT	Polenz 16'	Report	Brockie 60'	Attendance: 16,294; Referee: Jarred Gillett

27 October 2013 3	Wellington Phoenix	0–0	Newcastle Jets	McLean Park, Napier
Sunday, 17:00 NZDT; Sunday, 15:00 AEDT		Report		Attendance: 9,020; Referee: Adam Kersey

4 November 2013 4	Melbourne Victory	3–2	Wellington Phoenix	Etihad Stadium, Melbourne
Monday, 19:30 AEDT; Monday, 21:30 NZDT	A. Thompson 9'; Troisi 22', 31'	Report	Brockie 37'; Ifill 85'	Attendance: 23,226; Referee: Matthew Gillett

9 November 2013 5	Wellington Phoenix	1–1	Perth Glory	AMI Stadium, Christchurch
Saturday, 17:00 NZDT; Saturday, 12:00 AWST	Durante 4'	Report	Nagai 29'	Attendance: 9,671; Referee: Alan Milliner

19 December 2013 6 (Note: Match rescheduled due to clash with FIFA World Cup Qualifying match)	Central Coast Mariners	1–0	Wellington Phoenix	North Sydney Oval, Sydney
Thursday, 19:30 AEDT; Thursday, 21:30 NZDT	Roux 27'	Report		Attendance: 6,755; Referee: Kris Griffiths-Jones

23 November 2013 7	Sydney FC	2–1	Wellington Phoenix	Allianz Stadium, Sydney
Saturday, 17:30 AEDT; Saturday, 19:30 NZDT	Garcia 35'; Bojić (yellow card) 6' (yellow-red card) 73'; Despotović 90+4'	Report	Cunningham 90+1'	Attendance: 14,503; Referee: Jarred Gillett

1 December 2013 8	Wellington Phoenix	0–0	Western Sydney Wanderers	Westpac Stadium, Wellington
Sunday, 17:00 NZDT; Sunday, 15:00 AEDT		Report		Attendance: 7,147; Referee: Lucien Laverdure

6 December 2013 9	Perth Glory	4–2	Wellington Phoenix	nib Stadium, Perth
Friday, 18:45 AWST; Friday, 23:45 NZDT	Sidnei 16', 90+1'; Thwaite 60'; Zahra 82'	Report	Huysegems 36'; Ifill 49'	Attendance: 8,232; Referee: Matthew Gillett

14 December 2013 10	Wellington Phoenix	1–2	Brisbane Roar	Westpac Stadium, Wellington
Saturday, 17:30 NZDT; Saturday, 14:30 AEST	Hernández 48' (pen.)	Report	Smith 37'; Franjić 74'	Attendance: 6,374; Referee: Shaun Evans

22 December 2013 11	Wellington Phoenix	1–0	Sydney FC	Westpac Stadium, Wellington
Sunday, 19:00 NZDT; Sunday, 17:00 AEDT	Huysegems 33'	Report		Attendance: 6,339; Referee: Peter O'Leary

27 December 2013 12	Melbourne Heart	0–1	Wellington Phoenix	AAMI Park, Melbourne
Friday, 19:30 AEDT; Friday, 21:30 NZDT		Report	Huysegems 75'	Attendance: 6,486; Referee: Strebre Delovski

1 January 2014 13	Western Sydney Wanderers	1–3	Wellington Phoenix	Pirtek Stadium, Parramatta
Wednesday, 19:00 AEDT; Wednesday, 21:00 NZDT	Bridge 62'	Report	Boyd 68'; Huysegems 78', 84'	Attendance: 14,151; Referee: Lucien Laverdure

12 January 2014 14	Wellington Phoenix	1–1	Central Coast Mariners	Westpac Stadium, Wellington
Sunday, 19:00 NZDT; Sunday, 17:00 AEDT	Cunningham 45'	Report	Simon 16'	Attendance: 7,000; Referee: Matthew Gillett

18 January 2014 15	Wellington Phoenix	5–0	Melbourne Victory	Westpac Stadium, Wellington
Saturday, 19:00 NZDT; Saturday, 17:00 AEDT	Hernández 21', 45+2' (pen.); Cunningham 45+1'; Brockie 85'; Huysegems 87'	Report		Attendance: 6,813; Referee: Adam Kersey

24 January 2014 16	Brisbane Roar	2–1	Wellington Phoenix	Suncorp Stadium, Brisbane
Friday, 19:30 AEST; Friday, 22:30 NZDT	Clut 50'; Brattan 87'	Report	Huysegems 36'	Attendance: 13,889; Referee: Chris Beath

1 February 2014 17	Wellington Phoenix	2–1	Adelaide United	Eden Park, Auckland
Saturday, 19:30 NZDT; Saturday, 17:00 ACDT	Hernández 22'; Cunningham 44'	Report	Mabil 90+3'	Attendance: 18,506; Referee: Peter Green

9 February 2014 18	Newcastle Jets	2–3	Wellington Phoenix	Hunter Stadium, Newcastle
Sunday, 17:00 AEDT; Sunday, 19:00 NZDT	Goodwin 26', 46'	Report	Hernández 21'; Huysegems 33'; Hicks 71'	Attendance: 10,406; Referee: Shaun Evans

16 February 2014 19	Wellington Phoenix	0–5	Melbourne Heart	Westpac Stadium, Wellington
Sunday, 17:00 NZDT; Sunday, 15:00 AEDT		Report	Engelaar 9'; Williams 19', 51', 63'; Wielaert 54'	Attendance: 9,767; Referee: Jarred Gillett

21 February 2014 20	Central Coast Mariners	1–4	Wellington Phoenix	Central Coast Stadium, Gosford
Friday, 19:30 AEDT; Friday, 21:30 NZDT	Ibini 20'	Report	Cunningham 47'; Hernández 64'; Huysegems 65'; Brockie 82'	Attendance: 6,147; Referee: Alan Milliner

27 February 2014 21	Adelaide United	5–1	Wellington Phoenix	Coopers Stadium, Adelaide
Thursday, 19:00 ACDT; Sunday, 21:30 NZDT; Rescheduled	Jerónimo 23', 62'; Cirio 29'; Ferreira 59'; Mabil 90+2'	Report	Cunningham 67'; Muscat (yellow card) 43' (red card) 73'	Attendance: 8,596; Referee: Lucien Laverdure

9 March 2014 22	Wellington Phoenix	1–1	Perth Glory	Westpac Stadium, Wellington
Sunday, 17:00 NZDT; Sunday, 15:00 AWST	Cunningham 85'	Report	Gallas 34'	Attendance: 6,401; Referee: Jarred Gillett

16 March 2014 23	Melbourne Heart	2–2	Wellington Phoenix	AAMI Park, Melbourne
Sunday, 17:00 AEDT; Sunday, 19:00 NZDT	Germano 29'; Williams 62' (pen.)	Report	Krishna 6'; Sigmund (yellow card) 31' (red card) 33'; Boyd 56'	Attendance: 5,614; Referee: Ben Williams

22 March 2014 24	Newcastle Jets	5–0	Wellington Phoenix	Hunter Stadium, Newcastle
Saturday, 17:30 AEDT; Saturday, 19:30 NZDT	Heskey 35'; J. Griffiths 46'; Taggart 57', 77'; Bridges 90+3'	Report		Attendance: 9,483; Referee: Strebre Delovski

30 March 2014 25	Wellington Phoenix	0–1	Adelaide United	Westpac Stadium, Wellington
Sunday, 15:00 NZDT; Sunday, 12:30 ACDT		Report	Carrusca 58' (pen.)	Attendance: 6,453; Referee: Peter Green

6 April 2014 26	Sydney FC	4–1	Wellington Phoenix	Allianz Stadium, Sydney
Sunday, 17:00 AEDT; Sunday, 19:00 NZDT	Del Piero 33' (pen.), 45'; Ryall 57'; Abbas 60'	Report	Hernández 56' (pen.)	Attendance: 10,148; Referee: Kris Griffiths-Jones

12 April 2014 27	Wellington Phoenix	1–4	Melbourne Victory	Westpac Stadium, Wellington
Saturday, 17:30 NZDT; Saturday, 15:30 AEDT	Timmins (red card) 57'; Brockie 90+3'	Report	Thompson 1'; Troisi 29'; Finkler 45'; Milligan 59' (pen.)	Attendance: 5,336; Referee: Chris Beath
