= Ricardo Clarke =

Panamanian football player (born 1992)

Personal information
- Full name: Ricardo Mauricio Clarke Hamilton
- Date of birth: 27 September 1992 (age 34)
- Place of birth: Panama City, Panama
- Height: 1.80 m (5 ft 11 in)
- Position: Winger

Senior career*
Years	Team	Apps	(Gls)
2011–2013	San Miguelito	33	(12)
2012	→ Wellington Phoenix (loan)	2	(0)
2013–2014	→ Zamora (loan)	29	(10)
2014–2017	Zamora	81	(27)
2017	Boavista	3	(0)
2018	Nacional Asunción	12	(3)
2019	Guaraní	3	(0)
2019	The Strongest	10	(1)
2020–2021	San Miguelito	42	(10)

International career^{‡}
- Panama U20
2016–	Panama	6	(0)
- * Club domestic league appearances and goals as of 15:24, 6 June 2022 (UTC) ‡ National team caps and goals as of 26 February 2020 (UTC)

Ricardo Mauricio Clarke Hamilton (born 27 September 1992) is a Panamanian professional footballer who plays as a winger for the Panama national team.

== Club career ==
In September 2012 Clarke joined the A-League side Wellington Phoenix on loan as injury cover for Dani Sánchez. In August 2013 he was snapped up by Venezuelan side Zamora.

On 3 July 2017, Clarke signed a three-year deal with Boavista F.C. in the Primeira Liga.
