= Louis Fenton =

New Zealand footballer

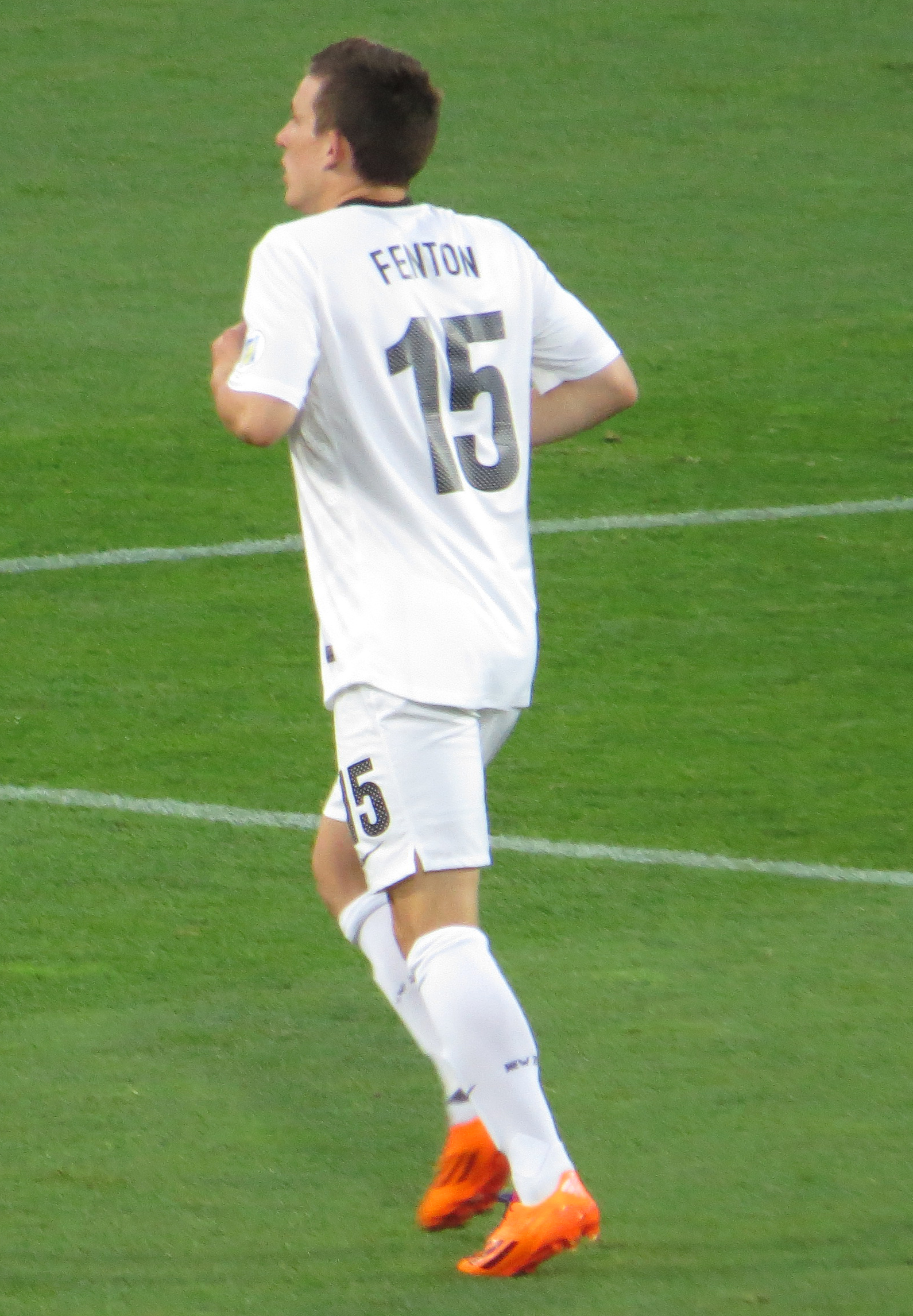
- Fenton playing for New Zealand in 2013

Personal information
- Full name: Louis Ferenc Puskas Fenton
- Date of birth: 3 April 1993 (age 33)
- Place of birth: Wellington, New Zealand
- Height: 1.75 m (5 ft 9 in)
- Position: Full-back

Team information
- Current team: Miramar Rangers
- Number: 15

Youth career
- –2011: Tawa A.F.C.

Senior career*
Years	Team	Apps	(Gls)
2011	St Albans Saints	12	(4)
2011–2012	Team Wellington	12	(8)
2012	Melbourne Knights	8	(2)
2012–2017	Wellington Phoenix	84	(4)
2016–2017	Wellington Phoenix Reserves	4	(0)
2017–2018	Team Wellington	6	(1)
2018	Melbourne Knights	5	(0)
2018–2022	Wellington Phoenix	75	(5)
2018	Wellington Phoenix Reserves	1	(0)
2022–2023	Lions FC	17	(4)
2025–	Miramar Rangers	0	(0)

International career^{‡}
2013	New Zealand U20	6	(5)
2012–2015	New Zealand U23	8	(3)
2013–2016	New Zealand	7	(0)
- * Club domestic league appearances and goals as of 31 March 2024 ‡ National team caps and goals as of 17 June 2016

Louis Ferenc Puskas Fenton (born 3 April 1993) is a New Zealand professional footballer who plays for National League club Miramar Rangers.

== Early life ==
Fenton, whose mother is Hungarian and whose father is a postman, is named after Hungarian international Ferenc Puskás.

== Club career ==
Fenton grew up in Tawa, playing for Tawa College and Tawa AFC before heading abroad for a brief stint in the Victorian Premier League with clubs St Albans Saints and Melbourne Knights. He lived during this time in Kings Park, in Melbourne's western suburbs, where he supported the Western Bulldogs Football Club. He scored on his senior professional debut in an A-League match against Sydney FC on 6 October 2012 with a spectacular diving header, courtesy of a Manny Muscat cross. Fenton made 10 starts for the Phoenix in 2013–14 before being sidelined for the year due to a dislocated shoulder suffered in a 3–1 away win to the Western Sydney Wanderers.

In September 2017, Fenton moved to Team Wellington.

In January 2018, Fenton signed again with Melbourne Knights

In July 2018, Fenton rejoined the Wellington Phoenix for the 2018–19 season.

In May 2022, Fenton announced his retirement.

== International career ==
Fenton represented New Zealand under 20s at the 2013 OFC U-20 Championship in Fiji. He was voted the player of the tournament as he helped the team qualify for the 2013 FIFA U-20 World Cup in Turkey.

Fenton made his debut for the senior team on 20 November 2013, in the second leg of the 2014 FIFA World Cup qualifying playoff against Mexico, substituting Bill Tuiloma in the 50th minute of the game.

== Career statistics ==
=== Club ===
As of 17 January 2018

Appearances and goals by club, season and competition
Club	Season	League			Cup		Continental		Total	
Club	Season	Division	Apps	Goals	Apps	Goals	Apps	Goals	Apps	Goals
St Albans Saints	2011	Victorian Premier League	12	4	0	0	0	0	12	4
Team Wellington	2011–12	NZ Premiership	12	8	1	3	0	0	13	11
Melbourne Knights	2012	Victorian Premier League	8	2	2	3	0	0	10	5
Wellington Phoenix	2012–13	A-League	26	3	0	0	0	0	26	3
Wellington Phoenix	2013–14	A-League	10	0	0	0	0	0	10	0
Wellington Phoenix	2014–15	A-League	22	0	1	0	0	0	23	0
Wellington Phoenix	2015–16	A-League	20	1	1	0	0	0	21	1
Wellington Phoenix	2016–17	A-League	6	0	0	0	0	0	6	0
Wellington Phoenix	Total		84	4	2	0	0	0	86	4
Wellington Phoenix Reserves	2016–17	NZ Premiership	4	0	0	0	0	0	4	0
Team Wellington	2017–18	NZ Premiership	6	1	0	0	0	0	6	1
Melbourne Knights	2018	Victorian Premier League	0	0	0	0	0	0	0	0
Career total			125	19	5	6	0	0	130	25

=== International ===
As of 17 January 2018

New Zealand national team
Year	Apps	Goals
2013	1	0
2015	2	0
2016	4	0
Total	7	0

== Honours ==
Wellington Phoenix

- NE Super Series Championship runner-up: 2012

New Zealand

- OFC Nations Cup: 2016
- OFC U-20 Championship: 2013
