= Jacob Spoonley =

New Zealand footballer

Personal information
- Full name: Jacob Spoonley
- Date of birth: 3 March 1987 (age 39)
- Place of birth: Palmerston North, New Zealand
- Height: 1.87 m (6 ft 2 in)
- Position: Goalkeeper

Senior career*
Years	Team	Apps	(Gls)
2004–2005	Southern United FC	12	
2005–2007	Auckland City	32	(0)
2007–2008	Wellington Phoenix	0	(0)
2008	Miramar Rangers	8	(0)
2008–2013	Auckland City	84	(0)
2012	→ Wellington Phoenix (loan)	1	(0)
2013–2014	→ Wellington Phoenix (loan)	2	(0)
2013–2014	Team Wellington	14	(0)
2014–2017	Auckland City	16	(0)
2017–2019	Forrest Hill Milford	16	(0)

International career^{‡}
2004–2007	New Zealand U-20	15	(0)
2008	New Zealand U-23	9	(0)
2008–2013	New Zealand	2	(0)
- * Club domestic league appearances and goals as of 5 December 2016 ‡ National team caps and goals as of 26 March 2013

Jacob Spoonley (born 3 March 1987) is a New Zealand former footballer who played as goalkeeper.

== Football career ==
In 2005, Spoonley played for Auckland City for two seasons. He left to the Wellington Phoenix in 2007 after a successful Under 20 World Cup in Canada.

He returned to Auckland City FC in late 2008 as the no. 1 choice for goalkeeper. Since returning to City he has helped them win three O-League titles in four seasons and has made two appearances at the FIFA Club World Cup, including in the 2014 edition where he stepped in for regular goalkeeper Tamati Williams to play in the third-place playoff against Cruz Azul, starring in a 4–2 shoot-out win after an initial 1–1 draw.

In October 2012, Spoonley was loaned to Wellington Phoenix for one week due to both regular keepers (Mark Paston and Glen Moss) being out on international duty. He played one game against Melbourne Heart, which was drawn 1–1. As a result of his performance he was voted as the goalkeeper in Fox Sports' team of the round.

== International career ==
He was the 1st choice keeper for New Zealand's matches at the 2007 FIFA U-20 World Cup in Canada.

Spoonley was included in the New Zealand squad for the football tournament at the Summer Olympics in Beijing. He played in New Zealand's three group matches against China (1–1), Brazil (0–5) and Belgium (0–1).

He made his New Zealand senior debut on 19 November 2008 in a 2–0 loss to Fiji after coming on as a substitute following the sending off of Glen Moss.

== Broadcasting career ==
From 2021, he became the analyst with fellow former New Zealand defender, Ivan Vicelich, for Sky Sports as New Zealand build up to 2022 World Cup Qualification.

=== International goals and caps ===
New Zealand's goal tally first.

International appearances and goals
#	Date	Venue	Opponent	Result	Competition	CS	Match Report
2008
1	19 November	Churchill Park, Lautoka	Fiji	0–2	2010 FIFA World Cup Qualifier		NZ Football
2013
2	26 March	Lawson Tama Stadium, Honiara	Solomon Islands	2–0	2014 FIFA World Cup Qualifier	1 (1)	NZ Football

=== International career statistics ===
New Zealand national team
Year	Apps	Goals
2008	1	0
2013	1	0
Total	2	0
