= Glen Moss =

New Zealand footballer (born 1983)

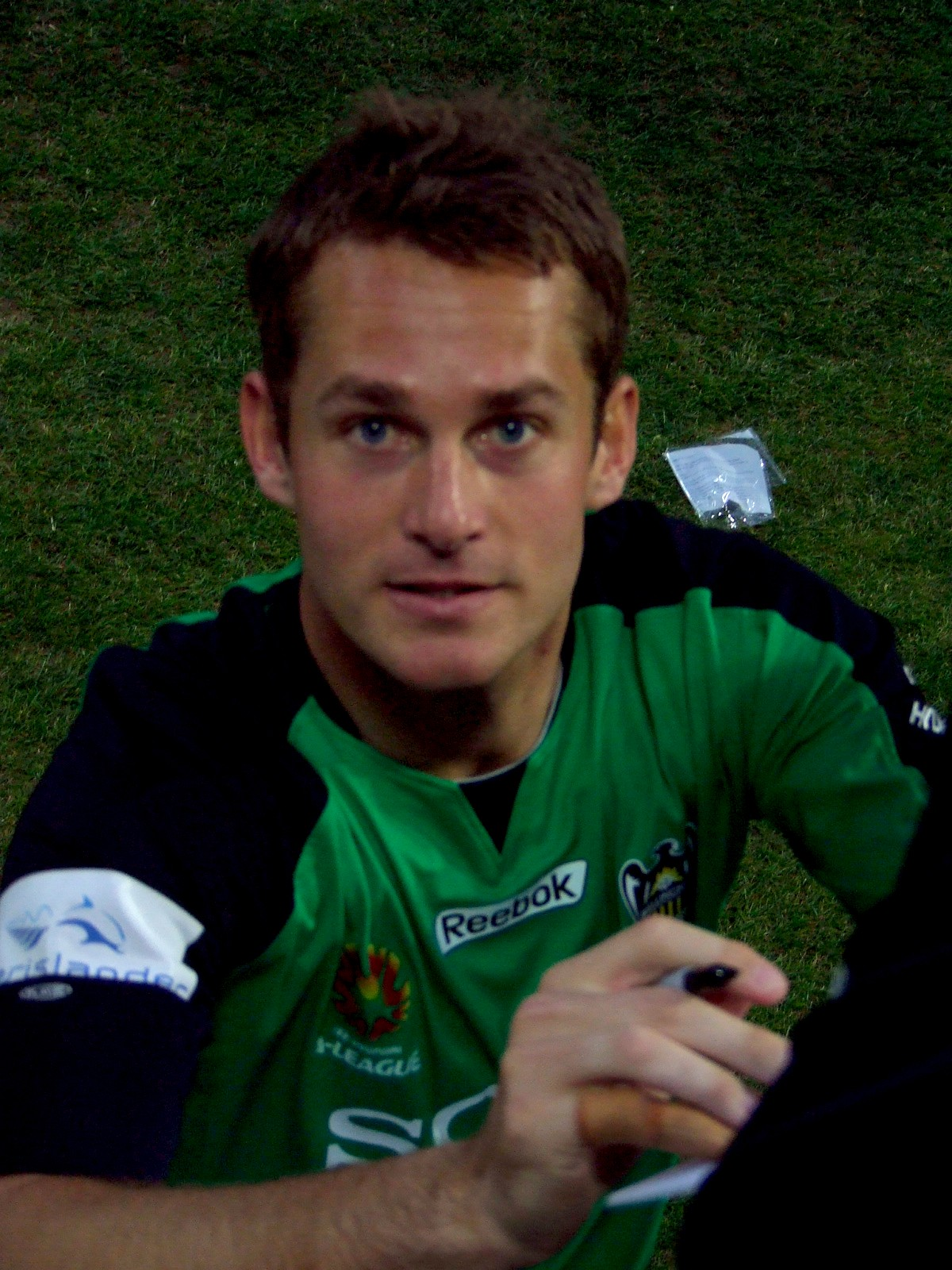
- Moss with Wellington Phoenix in 2009

Personal information
- Full name: Glen Robert Moss
- Date of birth: 19 January 1983 (age 43)
- Place of birth: Hastings, New Zealand
- Height: 1.87 m (6 ft 2 in)
- Position: Goalkeeper

Youth career
- Runaway Bay

Senior career*
Years	Team	Apps	(Gls)
2001–2002	Gold Coast	0	(0)
2002–2004	Sydney Olympic	3	(0)
2004	Stanmore Hawks	0	(0)
2004–2005	Bonnyrigg White Eagles	0	(0)
2005–2006	New Zealand Knights	9	(0)
2006–2007	Dinamo București	1	(0)
2007–2009	Wellington Phoenix	33	(0)
2009–2010	Melbourne Victory	14	(0)
2010–2012	Gold Coast United	41	(0)
2012–2017	Wellington Phoenix	107	(0)
2017–2020	Newcastle Jets	46	(0)
2023	Macarthur FC	0	(0)
Total		254	(0)

International career
2002	New Zealand U20	4	(0)
2004	New Zealand U23	6	(0)
2006–2017	New Zealand	29	(0)

Managerial career
- 2020–: Macarthur FC (goalkeeper coach)
- * Club domestic league appearances and goals

Glen Robert Moss (born 19 January 1983) is a New Zealand former football goalkeeper who is goalkeeping coach for Macarthur FC and assistant goalkeeping coach for the New Zealand national team. He played for New Zealand at international level. A foundational member of both the New Zealand Knights and Wellington Phoenix, Moss has competed in 14 seasons of the A-League, making 250 appearances while playing for the Knights, Phoenix, Melbourne Victory, Gold Coast United, and Newcastle Jets. Career highlights include starting a Grand Final with Newcastle, appearing in AFC Champions League games with Melbourne Victory and Newcastle, and making an A-League Team of the Season with Gold Coast.

With his birth country of New Zealand, Moss made 29 appearances, and was a member of their 2010 FIFA World Cup squad, although was controversially suspended for the first two games after an appeal for an earlier four-game ban was not submitted in time.

== Club career ==
=== Early career ===
Moss made his senior debut with Sydney Olympic of the NSL, appearing in three games of the competition's final season.

Having e-mailed the eight inaugural clubs of the A-League, Moss received interest from New Zealand Knights, who signed him to a one-year contract having watched him play for Sydney Olympic. Moss was back-up to Danny Milosevic in his only season with the Knights, making seven starts, as well as coming on at half-time twice. New Zealand finished with just 6 points in their inaugural season, and Moss's contract was not renewed after the season.

Impressing over the summer with the national team, Moss signed on a free transfer with Dinamo București of Romania. Moss made his debut for Dinamo in first round of qualification for the UEFA Cup, starting both legs against Maltese club Hibernians in July. Moss started the league opener against Național București on 30 July, but was replaced by Florin Matache for the club's next games. Having hovered between second and third-choice in the first half of the season, Moss sought out of Romania during the winter break, calling the move abroad a "disaster". Moss was instead the only senior keeper to stay on, and was firmly third-choice for the second half of the season as Dinamo went on to win their 18th title.

=== Wellington Phoenix ===
In August 2007, Moss signed a two-year contract with A-League newcomers, the Wellington Phoenix, recruited by manager Ricki Herbert as part of a contingent of All Whites players. Expected to back-up Mark Paston, Moss was inserted just ahead of Wellington's first game after Paston suffered an injury in training. In his first season, he made 20 appearances out of the 21 league games and earned a reputation as a top goalkeeper, and was seen as one of the league's best shot-stoppers. Moss made 78 saves to lead the league in his first season with Wellington, as the club finished bottom of the table with the league's worst defense. However, injuries and dips in form during 2008–09 saw him share the starting jersey with fellow All Whites goalkeeper Paston, making just 13 appearances and keeping 3 clean sheets.

=== Melbourne Victory ===
After impressive performances for club and country, Moss attracted interest from A-League champions Melbourne Victory. The move to Melbourne was confirmed during the 2008–09 season and would take place after the season. Moss attracted interest from clubs in South Africa for his performances in the 2009 FIFA Confederations Cup, which took place in South Africa, before kicking a ball for Melbourne. Moss began the season as the club's starting goalkeeper, featuring in the first 14 games. However, lacklustre performances midway through the season saw him overtaken by young-gun Mitchell Langerak as the Melbourne No. 1. Moss was on the bench for the remainder of the season, including the Finals, in which Victory lost to Sydney FC on penalties. Moss was given one start in the club's campaign in the 2010 AFC Champions League, a 4–0 defeat to Kawasaki Frontale, and left the club after the season.

=== Gold Coast United ===
On 19 July 2010 it was announced Moss had signed a 2-year deal with Gold Coast United, replacing Jess Vanstrattan, who had moved to Central Coast Mariners. and made his debut on 8 August against Brisbane Roar. Moss started 27 of their 30 matches in the regular season as the club finished in fourth, qualifying for the Finals. Moss kept a career-high 11 clean sheets in the regular season, one behind Michael Theoklitos of Brisbane for the league lead. His save percentage of 77% was only behind Danny Vukovic, who only started half of Wellington's games that season. Moss was selected to his first and only A-League Team of the Season for his efforts, earning a place on the bench behind Theoklitos. In the finals, Moss kept a clean sheet in their first game, a 1–0 win over Melbourne Victory. Gold Coast beat Adelaide in the next round, but lost 1–0 to Premiers Central Coast in the Preliminary final.

Moss started the first 11 games of the 2011–12 A-League, but suffered an injury taking a goal kick on 16 December against Adelaide, leaving the game and being replaced by Jerrad Tyson. Although hopeful he would return before the end of the season, Moss wound up missing the rest of the season, and Gold Coast United folded at the end of the season, forcing Moss to look for a new team.

=== Return to Wellington ===
On 28 March 2012 it was announced he had signed a 3-year contract with A-League club Wellington Phoenix, returning to the club after three seasons away. Moss was given a six-game run in the team toward the end of his first season back at the club, which included the last two games of the tenure of Ricki Herbert, the club's inaugural manager. Following the retirement of Mark Paston, Moss was made the number one goalkeeper at Wellington. Moss made 25 starts for Wellington in the 2013–14 A-League as the Phoenix finished in ninth. Moss tallied the league's worst save percentage at 65%, just below Nathan Coe of Melbourne Victory, as Wellington finished with the league's worst defense.

Moss made 27 appearances in the 2014–15 A-League for Wellington, as they finished in fourth, qualifying for their only Finals in Moss's seven seasons at the club. Moss finished the season with eight clean sheets, second only to Vedran Janjetović of Sydney FC. Wellington lost 2–0 in the quarterfinal to Melbourne City, ending their season. Moss started all 27 games for Wellington in the 2015–16 A-League, recording three clean sheets as the club finished in ninth. At the end of the season, Moss was awarded the Player of the Year and the Players' Player of the Year at Wellington.

Moss made 22 starts in the 2016–17 A-League for Wellington, notching five clean sheets, while missing a handful of games while on international duty. Wellington finished in seventh, six points shy of reaching the Finals. On 9 February 2017, Moss made his 200th A-League appearance, becoming the 18th player to do so. Moss was left on the bench for the run-in, as Lewis Italiano started the last four games of the season.

In his second stint at Wellington, Moss made 110 appearances across all competitions, keeping 23 clean sheets.

=== Newcastle Jets ===
On 15 May 2017, Moss signed with the Newcastle Jets of the A-League, his fifth different club in the league. He was manager Ernie Merrick's first signing at the club, and was reunited with his former boss at Melbourne Victory and Wellington. He began his stint at Newcastle as the backup to Jack Duncan. Moss made his Jets debut on 23 November against Melbourne Victory, filling in for an injured Duncan. Moss had a nine-game run in the side, finishing with a pair of clean sheets, before Duncan returned to the starting lineup on 20 January. Moss was unused as Newcastle finished out the regular season in second, qualifying for their first finals since 2010. Duncan suffered a quad tear during Newcastle's semifinal win over Melbourne City, and Moss saw out the last hour of the 2–1 win. Moss started the Grand Final on 5 May, a 1–0 defeat to Melbourne Victory.

Following the season, Duncan left the club for Saudi Arabia, and Moss was made the starting goalkeeper. Moss made 22 starts out of 27 in the 2018–19 season, missing a handful of games after leaving the club's game against Adelaide at halftime with a gash in his thigh. He finished the season with the league's second-best save percentage at 75%, behind Lawrence Thomas of Melbourne Victory. He also started Newcastle's two games in the 2019 AFC Champions League qualification, as they fell short of reaching the group stage when they lost to Kashima Antlers. On 26 February 2019, Moss signed a new one-year deal to keep him with the club through the next A-League season. Newcastle finished the A-League season in seventh, five points outside of the Finals.

Moss tore his calf attempting a goal kick against Sydney FC on 10 January 2020 and had to leave the game, being replaced by Lewis Italiano. At the time, Newcastle were bottom of the league with the league's worst defense, and Moss had the worst save percentage at 54%. While injured, Moss announced his retirement, to come at the end of the season. Upon returning from injury, Moss sat on the bench, and Italiano remained in the starting lineup. In what was the last game in the A-League before it was postponed due to the COVID-19 pandemic in Australia, Moss was given a five-minute run-out off the bench by new Jets manager Carl Robinson, seeing out a 2–1 victory over Melbourne City on 23 March. The appearance was also his 250th in the A-League.

=== Macarthur FC ===
In 2023, Moss was used as a reserve goalkeeper by Macarthur FC in the 2023–24 AFC Cup, after multiple other goalkeepers were unavailable.

== International career ==
Moss was raised in Australia, and was not on the radar for New Zealand internationally until his origins were shared with a reporter while Moss was at Sydney Olympic. Moss has earned national selection at Under-20, Under-23 and All Whites international level.

He was selected for the U-23's in 2004 to compete in the 2004 OFC Men's Olympic Football Tournament, the qualification tournament for the 2004 Summer Olympics.

Moss gained his first international recognition when called up for the New Zealand squad for a friendly match against Iran in October 2003, however he did not earn his first cap until a 1–0 win over Malaysia in February the following year. Moss was in goal for New Zealand's tour of Europe during the summer of 2006, as the All Whites picked up their first win over a European opponent when they beat Georgia 3–1.

Moss was named in New Zealand's 2009 Confederations Cup squad to travel to South Africa where he played in all three games against Spain, South Africa and Iraq, where he kept a clean sheet and earned the All Whites a 0–0 draw – New Zealand's first point in a major FIFA competition.

In November 2008, Moss was handed a four-match World Cup ban after swearing at referee Lencie Fred in a dead-rubber 2010 World Cup qualification match against Fiji. New Zealand attempted to appeal the length of the ban, but failed to submit their appeal on time. He was replaced by Mark Paston for the two World Cup play-off matches against Bahrain at the end of 2009. Following New Zealand's qualification for the World Cup, the ban meant Moss would miss the opening two group games.

On 10 May 2010, Moss was named in New Zealand's final 23-man squad to compete at the World Cup, but saw no action as in a reversal of roles, Paston played all of the All Whites' three games, keeping a clean sheet in the final game against Paraguay as the team missed out on a place in the last 16 despite remaining unbeaten.

Moss did not play in any of New Zealand's games at the 2012 OFC Nations Cup, which served as the second round of qualifying for the 2014 FIFA World Cup. This was despite the fact that Paston left the country's first game with an injury, and he was instead replaced by Jake Gleeson, who started the remaining games of the tournament. In the third round of World Cup qualification, Moss started the two games against Tahiti, as New Zealand finished top of the group, setting up an intercontinental play-off with Mexico. Following Paston's retirement in 2013, Moss was selected to start both legs of the play-off, having also started the country's three friendly matches in the preceding months. New Zealand lost 3–9 across the two legs, missing out on qualification.

Three friendly matches in 2014, including a goalless draw with South Africa in which Moss captained the side, proved to be his final caps for the national team, although he continued to be a part of the squad until 2017. He was on the bench for all of 2018 FIFA World Cup qualification, as well as the 2017 FIFA Confederations Cup, behind Stefan Marinovic. Moss announced his retirement from international football on 19 February 2018.

== Career statistics ==
Appearances and goals by club, season and competition
Club	Season	League (Note: includes A-League final series.)			Cup		International (Note: AFC Champions League statistics are included in season commencing during group stages (i.e. ACL 2010 and A-League season 2009–2010 etc.))		Total	
Club	Season	Division	Apps	Goals	Apps	Goals	Apps	Goals	Apps	Goals
Sydney Olympic	2003–04	National Soccer League	3	0	–		–		3	0
New Zealand Knights	2005–06	A-League	9	0	1	0	–		10	0
Dinamo București	2006–07	Liga I	1	0	0	0	2	0	3	0
Wellington Phoenix	2007–08	A-League	20	0	4	0	–		24	0
Wellington Phoenix	2008–09	A-League	13	0	3	0	–		16	0
Wellington Phoenix	Total		33	0	7	0	0	0	40	0
Melbourne Victory	2009–10	A-League	14	0	–		1	0	15	0
Gold Coast United	2010–11	A-League	30	0	–		–		30	0
Gold Coast United	2011–12	A-League	11	0	–		–		11	0
Gold Coast United	Total		41	0	0	0	0	0	41	0
Wellington Phoenix	2012–13	A-League	6	0	–		–		6	0
Wellington Phoenix	2013–14	A-League	25	0	–		–		25	0
Wellington Phoenix	2014–15	A-League	27	0	1	0	–		28	0
Wellington Phoenix	2015–16	A-League	27	0	1	0	–		28	0
Wellington Phoenix	2016–17	A-League	22	0	1	0	–		23	0
Wellington Phoenix	Total		107	0	3	0	0	0	110	0
Newcastle Jets	2017–18	A-League	11	0	–		–		11	0
Newcastle Jets	2018–19	A-League	22	0	2	0	2	0	26	0
Newcastle Jets	2019–20	A-League	13	0	1	0	–		14	0
Newcastle Jets	Total		46	0	3	0	2	0	51	0
Career total			254	0	14	0	5	0	273	0
