= Ian Hogg (footballer) =

New Zealand footballer

Personal information
- Full name: Ian Campbell Hogg
- Date of birth: 15 December 1989 (age 36)
- Place of birth: Auckland, New Zealand
- Height: 1.79 m (5 ft 10 in)
- Positions: Left back; midfielder

Team information
- Current team: Mt Albert-Ponsonby Lizard Kings

Youth career
- 2003–2005: Central United

Senior career*
Years	Team	Apps	(Gls)
2006–2008	Hawke's Bay United	31	(1)
2008	Waitakere United	7	(0)
2009	Hawke's Bay United	8	(0)
2009–2012	Auckland City	73	(5)
2012	Portland Timbers	0	(0)
2013	Wellington Phoenix	6	(0)
2013–2014	Waitakere United	18	(1)
2014–2015	Amicale F.C.	3	(0)
2015	Team Wellington	14	(2)
2016–2017	Waitakere United	5	(0)

International career
2001–2005	New Zealand U17	21	(5)
2005–2008	New Zealand U20	16	(1)
2008–2012	New Zealand U23	16	(0)
2012–	New Zealand	6	(1)
- * Club domestic league appearances and goals

Ian Campbell Hogg (born 15 December 1989) is a New Zealand professional footballer who is currently playing for Mt Albert-Ponsonby Lizard Kings in the NRF Masters Division 2. He has represented New Zealand at the Olympic Games on two occasions: Beijing 2008 and London 2012. Hogg was also a member of the senior national side that was involved in qualifying for the 2014 FIFA World Cup.

== Club career ==
Hogg was a member of the Auckland squad that contested the 2009 Club World Cup in the United Arab Emirates in 2009. Following the tournament, Hogg was named in the National Press's Team of the Tournament alongside Messi. In early August 2012 Hogg was signed by Major League Soccer side Portland Timbers after they traded Mike Chabala to D.C. United Hogg was released by Portland just three months later, failing to make a first-team appearance. In January 2013 Hogg joined A-League side Wellington Phoenix until the end of the 2012–13 season. The new coach of the Wellington Phoenix, Ernie Merrick, did not resign Hogg, and he was released from the club. On 24 November 2013, Hogg scored his first goal for Waitakere United against Wanderers SC in the 30th minute in an eventual 4–1 victory.

== International career ==
He represented New Zealand U-20 at the 2007 FIFA U-20 World Cup finals tournament in Canada and was included in the New Zealand squad for the football tournament at the Summer Olympics in Beijing where he played in all three of New Zealand's group matches against China (1–1), Brazil (0–5) and Belgium (0–1). Hogg attended Auckland Grammar School from 2003 to 2007. Subsequently, Hogg began studying at the University of Auckland in 2008. In 2012, Hogg was selected for his second Olympic Games in London. Hogg started every game for New Zealand at the tournament, who were eliminated after group play after matches against Belarus (0–1), Egypt (1–1), and Brazil (0–3).

In May 2012, he made his debut for the senior team as a left-midfielder in a friendly match against El Salvador and scored in the 27th minute with a left-footed strike. Hogg has been included in the New Zealand Squad for the 2014 World Cup Qualifiers for Brazil.

However, Hogg is suspended for the first leg of the World Cup intercontinental playoff qualifying match against a qualifier from the CONCACAF Federation (either Mexico or Panama). As a result, he has also not been considered for the tour of North America, playing against Trinidad and Tobago as well club team Chivas.

=== International goals and caps ===
New Zealand's goal tally first.

International appearances and goals
#	Date	Venue	Opponent	Result	Competition	Goal	Match Report
2012
1	23 May	BBVA Compass Stadium, Houston	El Salvador	2–2	International Match	1 (1)	NZ Football
2	26 May	Cotton Bowl Stadium, Dallas	Honduras	1–0	International Match		NZ Football
3	6 June	Lawson Tama Stadium, Honiara	Solomon Islands	1–1	2012 OFC Nations Cup		NZ Football
4	10 June	Lawson Tama Stadium, Honiara	Solomon Islands	4–3	2012 OFC Nations Cup		NZ Football
2013
5	22 March	Forsyth Barr Stadium, Dunedin	New Caledonia	2–1	2014 FIFA World Cup Qualifier		NZ Football
6	26 March	Lawson Tama Stadium, Honiara	Solomon Islands	2–0	2014 FIFA World Cup Qualifier		NZ Football

=== International career statistics ===
New Zealand national team
Year	Apps	Goals
2012	4	1
2013	2	0
Total	6	1

== Career statistics ==
Appearances and goals by club, season and competition
Club	Season	League			Cup		Continental		Other		Total	
Club	Season	Division	Apps	Goals	Apps	Goals	Apps	Goals	Apps	Goals	Apps	Goals
Hawke's Bay United	2006–07	Premiership	13	1	—		—		—		13	1
Hawke's Bay United	2007–08	Premiership	18	0	—		—		—		18	0
Hawke's Bay United	Total											
Waitakere United	2008–09	Premiership	2	0	—		1 (Note: Appearances in OFC Champions League)	0	—		3	0
Hawke's Bay United	2008–09	Premiership	7	0	—		—		—		7	0
Auckland City	2009–10	Premiership	12	0	—		6	1	5 (Note: Two appearances in New Zealand Football Championship play-offs; three appearances in FIFA Club World Cup)	0	23	1
Auckland City	2010–11	Premiership	12	0	—		8	1	3 (Note: Appearances in New Zealand Football Championship play-offs)	0	23	1
Auckland City	2011–12	Premiership	5	0	—		5	0	4 (Note: Two appearances in New Zealand Football Championship play-offs; one appearance in FIFA Club World Cup; one appearance in Charity Cup)	0	14	0
Auckland City	Total											
Portland Timbers 2	2012	MLS Reserve League	2	0	—		—		—		2	0
Wellington Phoenix	2012–13	A-League	3	0	—		—		—		3	0
Waitakere United	2013–14	Premiership	13	1	—		—		2 (Note: One appearance in New Zealand Football Championship play-offs; one appearance in Charity Cup)	0	15	1
Amicale	2014–15	PV Football League			—		3 (Note: Appearances in OFC President's Cup)	0			3	0
Team Wellingotn	2014–15	Premiership	8	0	—		4	1	2	1	14	2
Amicale	2016	PV Football League			—		3	0			3	0
Waitakere United	2016–17	Premiership	5	0	—		—		—		5	0
Career total												
