= Stein Huysegems =

Belgian footballer

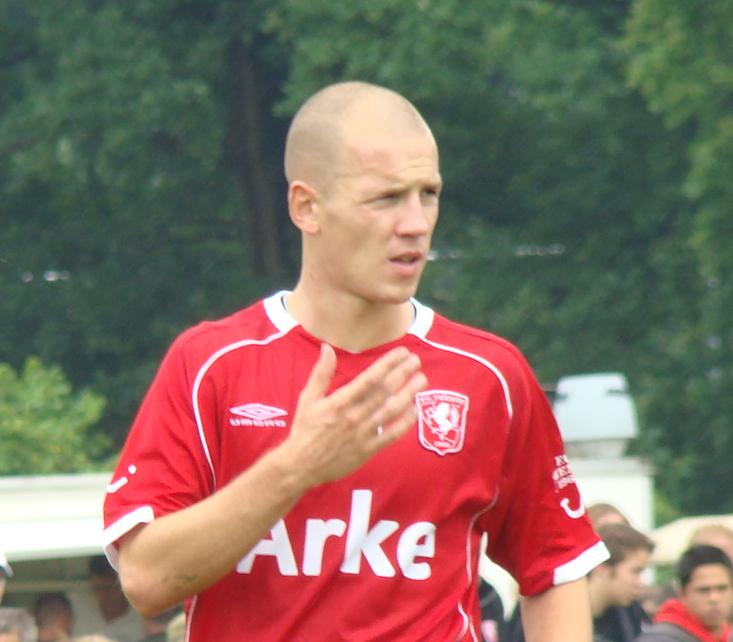
- Huysegems playing for Twente in 2008

Personal information
- Date of birth: 16 June 1982 (age 44)
- Place of birth: Herselt, Belgium
- Height: 1.86 m (6 ft 1 in)
- Position: Forward

Youth career
- 1990–1998: Lierse

Senior career*
| Years | Team | Apps | (Gls) |
| 1998–2003 | Lierse | 117 | (32) |
| 2003–2006 | AZ | 94 | (19) |
| 2006–2007 | Feyenoord | 25 | (6) |
| 2007–2009 | Twente | 38 | (6) |
| 2009–2011 | Genk | 33 | (3) |
| 2010–2011 | → Roda JC (loan) | 14 | (1) |
| 2011–2012 | Lierse | 18 | (1) |
| 2012–2014 | Wellington Phoenix | 48 | (15) |
| 2014–2016 | Dessel | 24 | (9) |
| 2016–2019 | Berlaar-Heikant | | |

International career
| 1995–1996 | Belgium U15 | 2 | (1) |
| 1996–1998 | Belgium U16 | 10 | (3) |
| 1998–1999 | Belgium U17 | 4 | (0) |
| 1999–2001 | Belgium U18 | 15 | (9) |
| 2000 | Belgium U19 | 1 | (1) |
| 2002–2003 | Belgium U21 | 10 | (1) |
| 2004–2009 | Belgium | 16 | (0) |
- * Club domestic league appearances and goals

Stein Huysegems (Dutch pronunciation: [ˈstɛin ˈɦœyzəɣɛms]; born 16 June 1982) is a Belgian former professional footballer who played as a forward.

== Club career ==
Huysegems started his career at Belgian club Lierse SK, and has also played for the Dutch Eredivisie powerhouses like AZ, Feyenoord and FC Twente.

On 16 January 2009, Huysegems signed a contract at Genk lasting until 30 June 2013.

In September 2010, he went out on loan until the end of the season to the Dutch Eredivisie club Roda JC, but his deal was terminated on 22 March 2011. Before the start of the 2011–12 season of the Belgian Pro League, he was deemed surplus to requirements at Genk and his contract was terminated by mutual consent. Some weeks later, he signed an achievement based one-year contract with Lierse on 3 September 2011. As the contract between Genk and Huysegems had not been terminated before 30 June 2011, the Royal Belgian Football Association ruled that he was not allowed to play for his new team before 2012, causing him to be sidelined for almost 5 months, earning only a basic wage without bonuses. On 14 September 2012 he was signed by Wellington Phoenix of New Zealand playing in the A-League. Huysegems scored on his Wellington Phoenix debut on 6 October 2012 in a 2–0 home win over Sydney FC in the opening game of the season. He increased his tally to three goals after four games – scoring away to Adelaide United and at home against the Brisbane Roar. Huysegems lost his form somewhat during the middle of the season, but rediscovered it later on. He broke his goal scoring drought on 17 March 2013, the second-to-last game of the season, with a header that saw the Phoenix beat Perth Glory 2–1. Huysegems scored his fifth goal for the Phoenix in his last match of the season vs. Melbourne Victory from a well-controlled chested volley.

In the 2013–14 A-League season, Huysegems finished the season with 10 goals in 26 games for the Phoenix, including a double in a match-winning performance away to Western Sydney Wanderers. He finished the season tied with Alessandro Del Piero of Sydney FC on the goal scoring table, 6 goals behind golden boot winner Adam Taggart of the Newcastle Jets.

Huysegems was released by the Wellington Phoenix on 13 April 2014 after the club would not offer a two-year deal to Huysegems, stating they would only offer him a one-year deal, which both parties couldn't agree to, so Huysegems and the Phoenix both parted ways.

In November 2014, Huysegems signed with Belgian Second Division club Dessel, and two years later joined amateur club FC Berlaar-Heikant, where he retired in April 2019.

== International career ==
Huysegems has represented the Belgium national football team 16 times.

== Retirement ==
After retiring from professional football, Huysegems has worked as a mail carrier.

== Honours ==
Lierse

- Belgian Super Cup: 1999

Genk

- Belgian Cup: 2008–09
