= Luke Rowe (footballer) =

New Zealand footballer

Personal information
- Full name: Luke Jonathan Rowe
- Date of birth: 16 September 1991 (age 35)
- Place of birth: Coventry, England
- Height: 1.77 m (5 ft 9 1/2 in)
- Position: Defender

Team information
- Current team: Rugby Borough

Youth career
- 2008–2011: Birmingham City

Senior career*
Years	Team	Apps	(Gls)
2011	Miramar Rangers		
2011–2012	Team Wellington	14	(2)
2012	Wellington Phoenix	2	(0)
2012–2013	Team Wellington	13	(2)
2013	Hinckley United		
2013	Eastwood Town	2	(0)
2014–2025	Bedworth United		
2025–	Rugby Borough	0	(0)

International career^{‡}
- New Zealand U-20
2013	New Zealand	1	(0)
- * Club domestic league appearances and goals as of 6 June 2025 ‡ National team caps and goals as of 26 June 2014

Luke Jonathan Rowe (born 16 September 1991) is a New Zealand footballer who plays in England for the Northern Premier League Division One Midlands side Rugby Borough, where he plays as a defender.

== Playing career ==
=== Wellington Phoenix ===
In June 2012 Rowe was named as one of eight inaugural players to join the Wellington Phoenix academy dubbed the 'Football School of Excellence'. Due to seven Phoenix players being away on international duty Rowe and fellow FSE player Tom Biss where called on to make their debuts in a round 2 away fixture against Melbourne Heart. Despite four players making their debut the Phoenix managed come away with a 1–1 draw. Rowe played a full 90 minutes at left back.

=== Eastwood Town ===
Luke Rowe joined Northern Premier League Division One South side Eastwood Town in October 2013, he only went on to make four appearances for the club (two league appearances), before departing in December 2013.

=== Rugby Borough ===
In June 2025, Rowe joined Northern Premier League Division One Midlands side Rugby Borough following ten seasons with Bedworth United.

== International career ==
Rowe represented New Zealand at the 2011 FIFA U-20 World Cup in Colombia.

In mid-2012 Rowe was named as one of four players on standby for the New Zealand Olympic Football team competing at the London Olympics.

=== International goals and caps ===
New Zealand's goal tally first.

International appearances and goals
#	Date	Venue	Opponent	Result	Competition	Goal	Match Report
2013
1	26 March	Lawson Tama Stadium, Honiara	Solomon Islands	2–0	2014 FIFA World Cup Qualifier		NZ Football
