= Dani Sánchez (footballer, born 1984) =

Spanish footballer (born 1984)

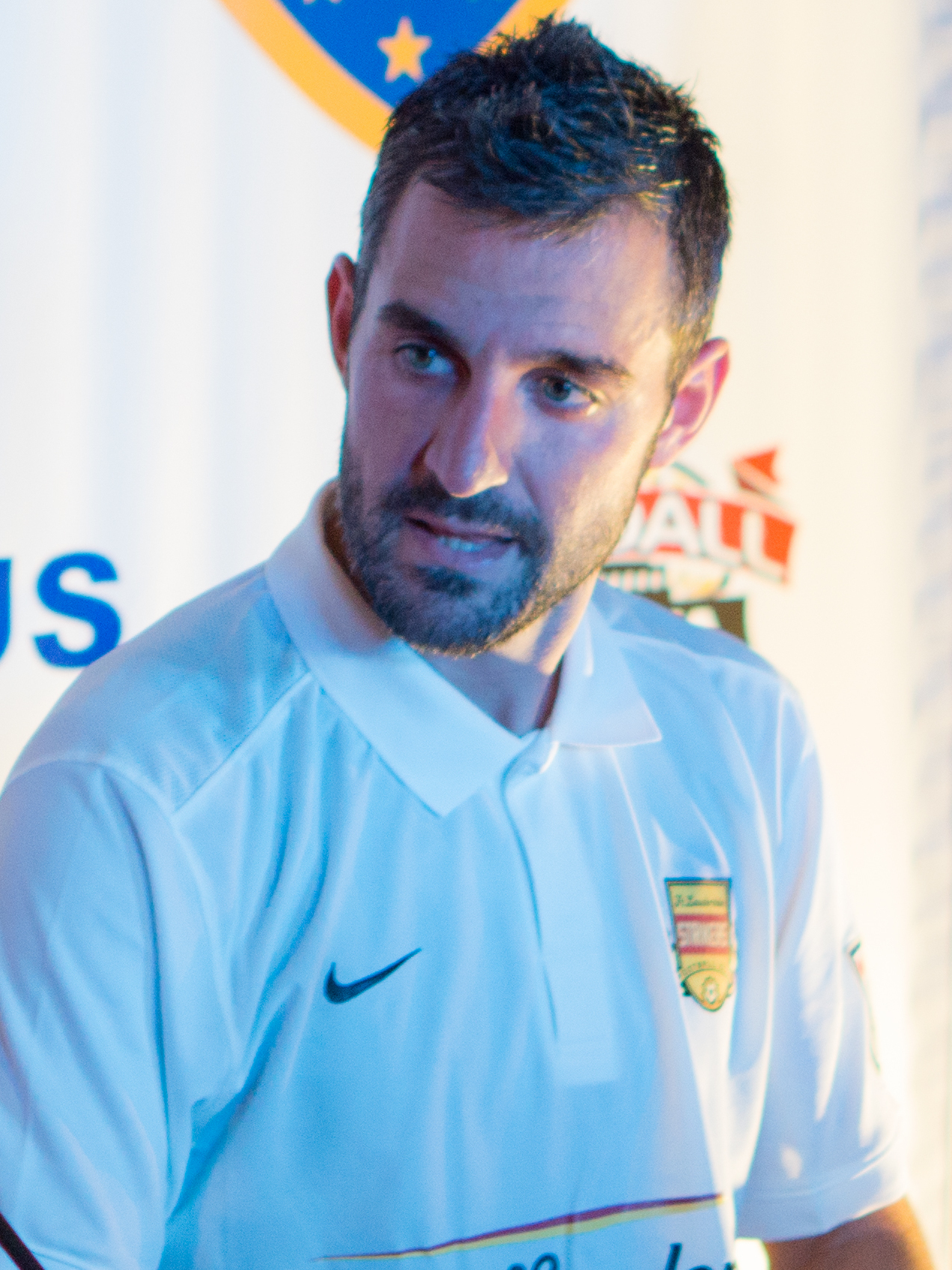
- Sánchez in 2015

Personal information
- Full name: Daniel Sánchez Andrades
- Date of birth: 10 November 1984 (age 42)
- Place of birth: Málaga, Spain
- Positions: Forward; midfielder

Youth career
- 2002–2003: Málaga

Senior career*
Years	Team	Apps	(Gls)
2003–2004	Alhaurino		
2004–2005	Baza		
2005–2006	Betis B		
2006–2009	Murcia B		
2009–2011	Inverness Caledonian Thistle	41	(5)
2011–2013	Wellington Phoenix	41	(7)
2013	Tuen Mun	9	(1)
2014–2015	Ayutthaya		
2015	Fort Lauderdale Strikers	25	(1)
2016	FC Jazz	22	(9)
- * Club domestic league appearances and goals

Daniel 'Dani' Sánchez Andrades (born 10 November 1984) is a Spanish former professional footballer who played as a forward or midfielder.

== Club career ==
Born in Málaga, Andalusia, Sánchez played youth football with hometown's Málaga CF, but never appeared as a senior for the club, eventually leaving in 2003. He went on to appear for several lower league teams over the following six seasons, never competing in higher than Segunda División B where he appeared for Real Murcia Imperial; he also represented CD Alhaurino, CD Baza and Real Betis B.

Sánchez signed for Inverness Caledonian Thistle in Scotland on 1 August 2009, following a trial period. He made his debut the same day, in a 4–0 home win against Annan Athletic for the season's Scottish League Cup.

Sánchez was released by Inverness in June 2011. The following month he began a trial with A-League club Wellington Phoenix FC, appearing in pre-season against Miramar Rangers AFC just two hours after getting off the plane. On 5 September, it was announced that he had signed a one-year contract.

On 9 June 2013, Sánchez was released alongside four other players. Subsequently, he took his game to the Hong Kong First Division League and the Thai Division 1 League.

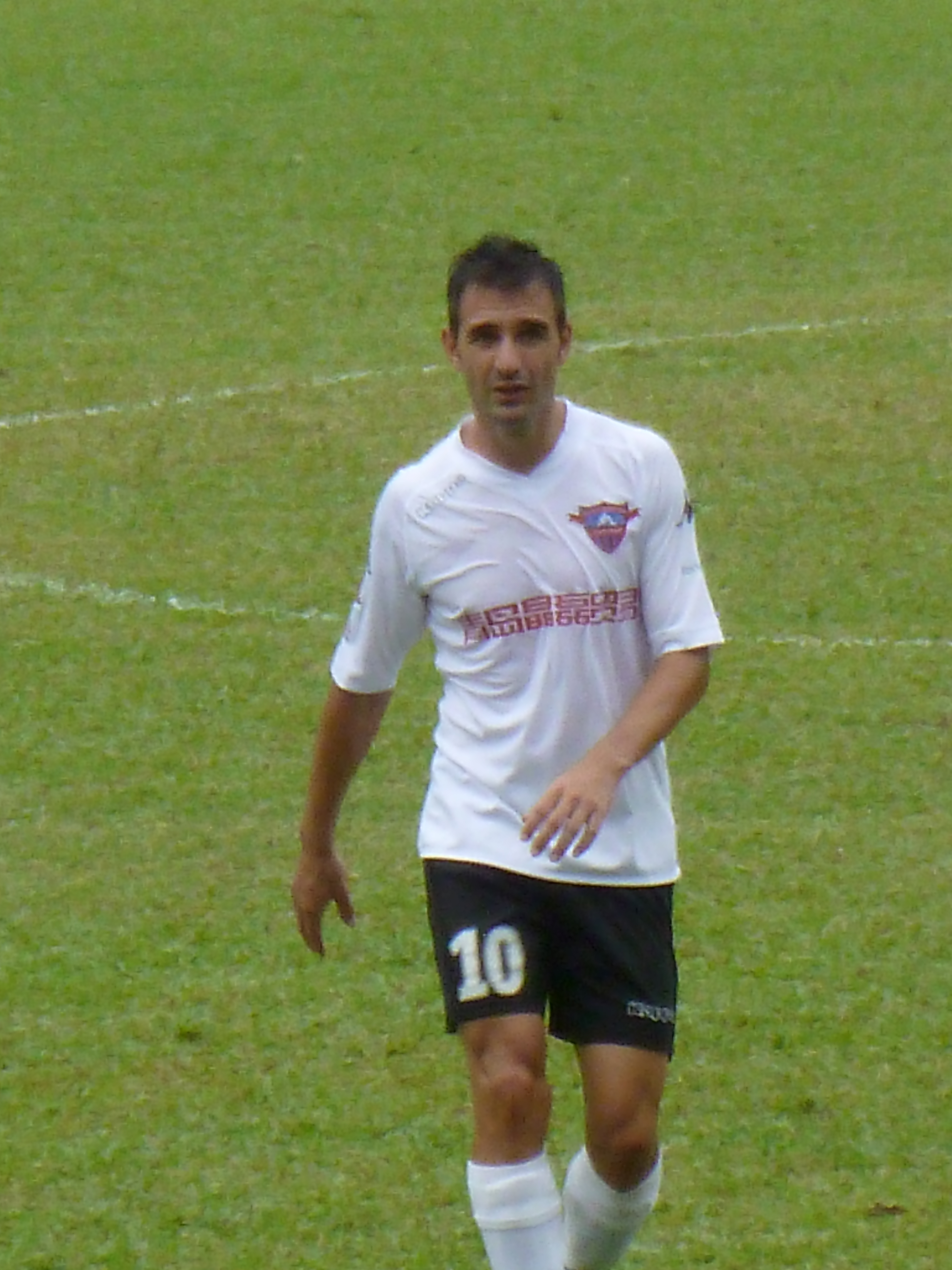
Sánchez playing for Tuen Mun.

On 29 January 2015, Sánchez signed with the Fort Lauderdale Strikers of the North American Soccer League. In April of the following year he switched clubs and countries again, joining FC Jazz in the Finnish Ykkönen.
