= 2010–11 Wellington Phoenix FC season =

Wellington Phoenix FC
2010–11 season
- CEO: Terry Serepisos; Nathan Greenham (interim CEO)
- Manager: Ricki Herbert
- A-League: 6th
- Finals: 6th
- Top goalscorer: Chris Greenacre; 8 goals
- Highest home attendance: 14,108 v Adelaide; 5 December 2010
- Lowest home attendance: 4,700 v Melbourne Heart; 24 November 2010
Home colours	Away colours

The 2010–11 Wellington Phoenix season was the Wellington Phoenix's fourth A-League season.

== Players ==
=== First team squad ===
Note: Flags indicate national team as defined under FIFA eligibility rules; some limited exceptions apply. Players may hold more than one non-FIFA nationality.

No.	Pos.	Nation	Player
1	GK	NZL	Mark Paston
2	DF	MLT	Manny Muscat
3	DF	NZL	Tony Lochhead
4	MF	AUS	Nick Ward
5	MF	BRA	Diego
6	MF	NZL	Tim Brown (Vice-Captain)
7	MF	NZL	Leo Bertos
8	FW	BRB	Paul Ifill
9	FW	ENG	Chris Greenacre
10	MF	ARG	Oscar Roberto Cornejo
11	MF	BRA	Daniel
12	DF	NZL	James Musa (youth)
13	DF	AUS	Troy Hearfield

No.	Pos.	Nation	Player
14	FW	AUS	Mirjan Pavlovic (youth)
15	DF	AUS	Jade North (Australian marquee)
17	MF	AUS	Vince Lia
18	DF	NZL	Ben Sigmund
19	GK	AUS	Danny Vukovic
20	GK	AUS	Reece Crowther
21	MF	NZL	Marco Rojas (youth)
22	DF	AUS	Andrew Durante (captain)
23	FW	AUS	Dylan Macallister
24	MF	NZL	Sean Lovemore (on loan)
26	MF	NZL	Simon Elliott (short-term contract)
30	GK	AUS	Griffin McMaster (short-term injury cover)

1 Manny Muscat does not count to the foreign players quota as he holds Australian citizenship.

=== Contract extensions ===
No.	Pos.	Name	Contract extension	Contract end
20	GK	(Australia) Reece Crowther	1 year	March 2011
13	DF	(Australia) Troy Hearfield	1 year	March 2011
1	GK	(New Zealand) Mark Paston	1 year	March 2012
9	FW	(England) Chris Greenacre	1 year	March 2012
8	FW	(Barbados) Paul Ifill	2 years	March 2012
2	DF	(Malta) Manny Muscat	2 years	March 2012
17	MF	(Australia) Vince Lia	2 years	March 2012
6	MF	(New Zealand) Tim Brown	2 years	March 2013
18	DF	(New Zealand) Ben Sigmund	2 years	March 2013
14	FW	(Australia) Mirjan Pavlovic	2 years	March 2013
7	MF	(New Zealand) Leo Bertos	3 years	March 2013
22	DF	(Australia) Andrew Durante	3 years	March 2013

=== Transfers ===
==== In ====
No.	Pos.	Player	From	Notes
4	MF	(Australia) Nick Ward	(Australia) Melbourne Victory	
10	MF	(Argentina) Oscar Roberto Cornejo	(Chile) Everton	
12	DF	(New Zealand) James Musa	Academy	
14	FW	(Australia) Mirjan Pavlovic	(Australia) Sydney United FC	
15	DF	(Australia) Jade North	(Norway) Tromsø IL	
19	GK	(Australia) Danny Vukovic	(Turkey) Konyaspor	
23	FW	(Australia) Dylan Macallister	(Australia) Central Coast Mariners	
24	MF	(New Zealand) Sean Lovemore	(New Zealand) Waitakere United	On loan
26	MF	(New Zealand) Simon Elliott	(United States) San Jose Earthquakes	Short-term injury cover
30	GK	(Australia) Griffin McMaster	(Australia) Oakleigh Cannons FC	Short-term injury cover

==== Out ====
No.	Pos.	Player	To	Notes
4	DF	(Australia) Jon McKain	(Saudi Arabia) Al-Nassr	
10	MF	(Australia) Michael Ferrante	(Australia) Richmond Eagles	
12	MF	(China) Jiang Chen	(China) Tianjin Teda F.C.	
14	MF	(Australia) Adrián Cáceres	(Australia) Inglewood United	
15	FW	(Ivory Coast) Eugene Dadi	(Indonesia) Persibo Bojonegoro	
16	DF	(New Zealand) David Mulligan	(New Zealand) Auckland City FC	
23	FW	(New Zealand) Kosta Barbarouses	(Australia) Brisbane Roar	
40	GK	(Australia) Liam Reddy	(Australia) Sydney FC	

== Matches ==
=== 2010–11 pre-season friendlies ===
8 June 2010	Lower Hutt City AFC (New Zealand)	0–6	(New Zealand) Wellington Phoenix	Porirua Park, Porirua
19:00 NZST			(2) P. Ifill (2) C. Greenacre; D. Macallister; R. Cain

23 June 2010	New Zealand U-20	2–6	(New Zealand) Wellington Phoenix	Porirua Park, Porirua
19:00 NZST	(2) C. Greenacre (2) D. Macallister; P. Ifill; L. Fenton

10 July 2010	Wellington Phoenix (New Zealand)	2–1	(Australia) Brisbane Roar	Waikato Stadium, Hamilton
14:00 NZST	P. Ifill; D. Macallister	(2–0)	M. Mckay	Attendance: 9,000; Referee: (New Zealand) Jamie Cross

16 July 2010	Adelaide United (Australia)	2–0	(New Zealand) Wellington Phoenix	Hindmarsh Stadium, Adelaide
	S. van Dijk; L. Pantelis			Attendance: 1,516

23 July 2010	Wellington Phoenix (New Zealand)	2–1	(Argentina) Boca Juniors	Westpac Stadium, Wellington
	D. Macallister 24'; T. Brown (yellow card) 49'; A. Durante 60'	(1–0); Report; Highlights	(red card) 73' C. Cellay; (yellow card) 48' L. Viatri; (yellow card) 54' J. Méndez; (yellow card) 57' J. Insaurralde; 82' (o.g.) A. Durante; (yellow card) 90+1' José María	Attendance: 11,751; Referee: (New Zealand) Jamie Cross

28 July 2010	Wairarapa United (New Zealand)	1–5	(New Zealand) Wellington Phoenix	Hullena Park, Masterton, New Zealand
14:00 NZST	A. Abba 60'	(0–3)	5', 86', 90+2' M. Pavlovic; 32' O. Cornejo; 40' Diego

7 August 2010	New Zealand U-20	1–5	(New Zealand) Wellington Phoenix	Hutt Park Raceway, Upper Hutt
12:30 NZST		(0–1)	25' L. Bertos; 58' B. Sigmund; 78' T. Brown; 83' P. Ifill; 87' M. Pavlovic

=== 2010–11 Hyundai A-League fixtures ===
13 August 2010 Round 1	Wellington Phoenix	3–3	Gold Coast United	Westpac Stadium, Wellington
17:30 NZST; 15:30 AEST Wellington Starting XI: 1 Mark Paston (gk); 2 Manny Muscat; 3 Tony Lochhead; 6 Tim Brown; 7 Leo Bertos (substituted off) 83'; 8 Paul Ifill; 9 Chris Greenacre; 17 Vince Lia; 18 Ben Sigmund; 22 Andrew Durante (c); 23 Dylan Macallister (substituted off) 72'; Substitutes: 30 Jonathan Gould (gk); 10 Toto; 11 Daniel (substituted on) 83'; 13 Troy Hearfield (substituted on) 72'	P. Ifill 7'; L. Bertos (yellow card) 22'; C. Greenacre 38', 56'; A. Durante (yellow card) 48'; B. Sigmund (yellow card) 80'	(2–1); Summary; 10 Shots 17; 8 Shots on Target 9; 11 Fouls Committed 14; 7 Corners 9; 4 Offsides 6; 51% Possession 49%	(yellow card) 18' D. Djulbic; 36', 75' S. Smeltz; (yellow card) 55' M. Thwaite; 87' J. Culina; (yellow card) 90+2' T. Minniecon	Attendance: 8,938; Referee: (New Zealand) Peter O'Leary Gold Coast Starting XI: 1 Glen Moss (gk); 3 Michael Thwaite; 6 Dino Djulbic; 7 Zenon Caravella; 8 Anderson Alves da Silva; 9 Shane Smeltz; 10 Jason Culina (c); 13 Bas van den Brink (substituted off) 62'; 14 Joel Porter; 16 Kristian Rees (substituted off) 66'; 18 James Brown; Substitutes: 20 Scott Higgins (gk); 2 Steve Pantelidis (substituted on) 66'; 5 Robson Alves da Silva (substituted on) 62'; 15 Tahj Minniecon

22 August 2010 Round 2	Wellington Phoenix	2–0	Central Coast Mariners	Westpac Stadium, Wellington
15:00 NZST; 13:00 AEST Wellington Starting XI: 1 Mark Paston (gk); 2 Manny Muscat; 3 Tony Lochhead; 6 Tim Brown; 7 Leo Bertos (substituted off) 58'; 8 Paul Ifill; 9 Chris Greenacre; 17 Vince Lia; 18 Ben Sigmund; 22 Andrew Durante (c); 23 Dylan Macallister (substituted off) 90+3'; Substitutes: 30 Griffin McMaster (gk); 10 Toto (substituted on) 58'; 11 Daniel (substituted on) 90+3'; 13 Troy Hearfield	L. Bertos 10'; P. Ifill 61'; T. Lochhead (yellow card) 63'	(1–0); Summary; 12 Shots 15; 2 Shots on Target 2; 12 Fouls Committed 11; 3 Corners 5; 6 Offsides 3; 46% Possession 54%	(yellow card) 75' N. Mrdja	Attendance: 9,553; Referee: (New Zealand) Peter O'Leary

27 August 2010 Round 3	Brisbane Roar	1–0	Wellington Phoenix	Suncorp Stadium, Brisbane
20:00 AEST; 22:00 NZST	M. McKay (yellow card) 71'; K. Barbarouses 73'	(0–0); Summary; 11 Shots 13; 6 Shots on Target 5; 13 Fouls Committed 16; 6 Corners 4; 5 Offsides 1; 53% Possession 47%	(yellow card) 11' P. Ifill; (yellow card) 35' V. Lia; (yellow card) 45+1' T. Brown; (yellow card) 53' A. Durante; (yellow card) 75' M. Pavlovic	Attendance: 7,339; Referee: (Australia) Chris Beath Wellington Starting XI: 1 Mark Paston (gk); 2 Manny Muscat; 3 Tony Lochhead; 6 Tim Brown; 7 Leo Bertos; 8 Paul Ifill; 9 Chris Greenacre (substituted off) 80'; 17 Vince Lia; 18 Ben Sigmund; 22 Andrew Durante (c); 23 Dylan Macallister (substituted off) 66'; Substitutes: 19 Danny Vukovic; 11 Daniel; 13 Troy Hearfield (substituted on) 80'; 14 Mirjan Pavlovic (substituted on) 66'

5 September 2010 Round 4	Perth Glory	2–1	Wellington Phoenix	nib Stadium, Perth
15:00 AWST; 19:00 NZST	M. Sterjovski 6' (yellow card) 25'; R. Fowler 61'	(1–0); Summary; 13 Shots 15; 5 Shots on Target 7; 14 Fouls Committed 17; 6 Corners 4; 6 Offsides 0; 48% Possession 52%	(yellow card) 45' Daniel; 73' (yellow card) 79' B. Sigmund; (yellow card) 80' T. Hearfield	Attendance: 10,988; Referee: (Australia) Ben Williams Wellington Starting XI: 1 Mark Paston (gk); 3 Tony Lochhead; 6 Tim Brown (substituted off) 46'; 8 Paul Ifill; 9 Chris Greenacre; 11 Daniel (substituted off) 67'; 13 Troy Hearfield; 17 Vince Lia; 18 Ben Sigmund; 22 Andrew Durante (c); 23 Dylan Macallister (substituted off) 46'; Substitutes: 19 Danny Vukovic; 4 Nick Ward (substituted on) 46'; 7 Leo Bertos (substituted on) 67'; 14 Mirjan Pavlovic (substituted on) 46'

11 September 2010 Round 5	Wellington Phoenix	2–1	Sydney FC	Westpac Stadium, Wellington
19:15 NZST; 17:15 AEST Wellington Starting XI: 19 Danny Vukovic (gk); 2 Manny Muscat; 3 Tony Lochhead; 4 Nick Ward; 6 Tim Brown; 7 Leo Bertos; 8 Paul Ifill; 9 Chris Greenacre (substituted off) 82'; 13 Troy Hearfield; 18 Ben Sigmund; 22 Andrew Durante (c); Substitutes: 30 Griffin McMaster (gk); 11 Daniel; 14 Mirjan Pavlovic (substituted on) 82'; 23 Dylan Macallister	P. Ifill 50' (pen.); N. Ward 72'	(0–0); Summary; 14 Shots 14; 6 Shots on Target 4; 13 Fouls Committed 8; 5 Corners 2; 1 Offsides 1; 44% Possession %56	(yellow card) 49' (goal) 67' B. Cazarine	Attendance: 8,453; Referee: (Australia) Chris Beath

15 September 2010 Round 6	Melbourne Victory	0–0	Wellington Phoenix	AAMI Park, Melbourne
21:30 NZST; 19:30 AEST	D. Ferreira (yellow card) 42'; M. Foschini (yellow card) 89'	(0–0); Summary; 8 Shots 14; 2 Shots on Target 3; 22 Fouls Committed 21; 2 Corners 4; 5 Offsides 4; 49% Possession 51%	(yellow card) 17' B. Sigmund; (yellow card) 51' C. Greenacre; (yellow card) 78' P. Ifill	Attendance: 11,571; Referee: (Australia) Ben Williams

19 September 2010 Round 7	Melbourne Heart	2–1	Wellington Phoenix	AAMI Park, Melbourne
15:00 AEST; 17:00 NZST	J. Aloisi 50'; A. Terra 66'	(0–0); Summary; 15 Shots 9; 6 Shots on Target 4; 14 Fouls Committed 7; 4 Corners 4; 2 Offsides 2; 54% Possession 46%	(yellow card) 45+2' M. Muscat; 75' T. Brown	Referee: (Australia) Peter Green

24 September 2010 Round 8	Wellington Phoenix	2–1	North Queensland Fury	Westpac Stadium, Wellington
19:30 NZST; 17:30 AEST	C. Greenacre 4'; L. Bertos 13' (yellow card) 58'; V. Lia (yellow card) 37' (yellow-red card) 64'; B. Sigmund (yellow card) 65'; Daniel (yellow card) 69'	(2–0); Summary; 8 Shots 13; 4 Shots on Target 6; 12 Fouls Committed 12; 7 Corners 2; 10 Offsides 0; 54% Possession 46%	(yellow card) 65' U. Talay; 67' M. Hughes; (yellow card) 75' B. Studman	Attendance: 7,212; Referee: (New Zealand) Peter O'Leary

1 October 2010 Round 9	Gold Coast United	3–1	Wellington Phoenix	Skilled Park, Gold Coast
20:00 AEST; 23:00 NZDT	B. Djite 6', 70'; J. Culina (yellow card) 21'; J. Brown (yellow card) 76' (goal) 82'	(1–1); Summary; 10 Shots 5; 6 Shots on Target 3; 20 Fouls Committed 12; 4 Corners 1; 3 Offsides 2; 49% Possession 51%	9' (pen.) P. Ifill; (yellow card) 23' T. Brown; (yellow card) 81' M. Pavlovic	Attendance: 2,943; Referee: (Australia) Matthew Gillett

17 October 2010 Round 10	Wellington Phoenix	2–2	Melbourne Heart	Westpac Stadium, Wellington
17:00 NZDT; 15:00 AEDT	C. Greenacre 6'; L. Bertos 59'; P. Ifill (yellow card) 79'	(1–2); Summary; 10 Shots 10; 8 Shots on Target 3; 12 Fouls Committed 15; 7 Corners 7; 4 Offsides 4; 49% Possession 51%	14' (pen.) J. Aloisi; 36' M. Thompson; (yellow card) 44' S. Colosimo	Attendance: 5,211; Referee: (Australia) Matthew Breeze

22 October 2010 Round 11	Adelaide United	3–0	Wellington Phoenix	Hindmarsh Stadium, Adelaide
19:30 ACDT; 22:00 NZDT	R. Cornthwaite (yellow card) 48'; S. van Dijk 71'; M. Flores 72'; T. Dodd 77'; A. Hughes (yellow card) 81'	(0–0); Summary; 18 Shots 17; 8 Shots on Target 6; 13 Fouls Committed 14; 7 Corners 10; 2 Offsides 1; 49% Possession 51%	(yellow card) 30' T. Brown	Attendance: 11,026; Referee: (Australia) Alan Milliner

3 November 2010 Round 12	Wellington Phoenix	1–4	Brisbane Roar	Westpac Stadium, Wellington
19:30 NZDT; 16:30 AEST	J. North (yellow card) 25'; T. Brown 37'; P. Ifill (yellow card) 68'	(1–2); Summary; 13 Shots 14; 5 Shots on Target 8; 9 Fouls Committed 6; 7 Corners 4; 3 Offsides 5; 51% Possession 49%	4' K. Barbarouses; 45'T. Broich; 76' M. Murdocca; 90+2' M. Nichols	Attendance: 5,529; Referee: (New Zealand) Peter O'Leary

7 November 2010 Round 13	Perth Glory	0–1	Wellington Phoenix	nib Stadium, Perth
16:00 AWST; 21:00 NZDT	S. Neville (yellow card) 31'; J. Burns (yellow card) 33' (yellow-red card) 80'; B. Griffiths (yellow card) 64'; A. Todd (yellow card) 90+2'	(0–1); Summary; 10 Shots 12; 5 Shots on Target 4; 18 Fouls Committed 12; 6 Corners 4; 1 Offsides 3; 51% Possession 49%	1' (yellow card) 44' T. Brown; (yellow card) 34' V. Lia; (yellow card) 68' S. Elliott; (yellow card) 70' M. Muscat; (yellow card) 90+1' A. Durante	Attendance: 6,676; Referee: (Australia) Kris Griffiths-Jones

13 November 2010 Round 14	Wellington Phoenix	0–3	Central Coast Mariners	Westpac Stadium, Wellington
19:30 NZDT; 17:30 AEDT	T. Brown (yellow card) 65'	(0–1); Summary; 13 Shots 19; 2 Shots on Target 10; 11 Fouls Committed 10; 9 Corners 6; 4 Offsides 3; 48% Possession 52%	17', 80' J. Rose; (yellow card) 18' P. Zwaanswijk; (yellow card) 48' O. Bozanic; (yellow card) 70' M. Simon; 86' A. Kwasnik	Attendance: 5,778; Referee: (Australia) Peter Green

20 November 2010 Round 15	Newcastle Jets	1–0	Wellington Phoenix	EnergyAustralia Stadium, Newcastle
19:00 AEDT; 21:00 NZDT	A. Abbas (yellow card) 29'; M. Jesic 55'	(0–0); Summary; 10 Shots 7; 3 Shots on Target 3; 7 Fouls Committed 9; 3 Corners 4; 9 Offsides 3; 53% Possession 47%		Attendance: 12,147; Referee: (Australia) Gerard Parsons

24 November 2010 Round 16	Wellington Phoenix	2–0	Melbourne Heart	Westpac Stadium, Wellington
19:00 NZDT; 17:00 AEDT	Daniel (yellow card) 26'; P. Ifill 62', 73'; B. Sigmund (yellow card) 84'	(0–0); Summary; 15 Shots 11; 5 Shots on Target 4; 14 Fouls Committed 15; 4 Corners 2; 3 Offsides 3; 54% Possession 46%	(yellow card) 58' (yellow-red card) 71' M. Thompson	Attendance: 4,700; Referee: (Australia) Jarred Gillett

27 November 2010 Round 17	Wellington Phoenix	2–2	Melbourne Victory	Westpac Stadium, Wellington
18:00 NZDT; 16:00 AEDT	T. Brown 18'; M. Muscat (yellow card) 62'; P. Ifill 84'	(1–2); Summary; 10 Shots 7; 6 Shots on Target 4; 7 Fouls Committed 9; 4 Corners 2; 4 Offsides 1; 47% Possession 53%	21' A. Thompson; (yellow card) 25' A. Leijer; 40' R. Kruse; (yellow card) 74' M. Angulo; (yellow card) 89' D. Ferreira	Attendance: 6,475; Referee: (New Zealand) Peter O'Leary

1 December 2010 Round 18	Sydney FC	3–1	Wellington Phoenix	Sydney Football Stadium, Sydney
19:00 AEDT; 21:00 NZDT	B. Gan 14'; M. Bridge 74'; A. Brosque 76'	(1–0); Report; Summary; 14 Shots 14; 8 Shots on Target 8; 11 Fouls Committed 11; 4 Corners 6; 1 Offsides 5; 52% Possession 48%	(yellow card) 78' B. Sigmund; 83' D. Macallister	Attendance: 4,012; Referee: (Australia) Gerard Parsons

5 December 2010 Round 19	Wellington Phoenix	2–1	Adelaide United	AMI Stadium, Christchurch
17:00 NZDT; 14:30 ACDT	A. Durante (yellow card) 23'; T. Brown 46'; C. Greenacre (yellow card) 86'; N. Ward (yellow card) 87'; B. Sigmund 90+4'	(0–1); Summary; 21 Shots 6; 9 Shots on Target 2; 9 Fouls Committed 14; 6 Corners 4; 3 Offsides 1; 69% Possession 31%	14' S. van Dijk; (yellow card) 38' M. Flores; (yellow card) 44' R. Cornthwaite; (red card) 83' T. Dodd	Attendance: 14,108; Referee: (New Zealand) Peter O'Leary

11 December 2010 Round 20	Gold Coast United	2–0	Wellington Phoenix	Skilled Park, Gold Coast
20:15 AEST; 23:15 NZDT Gold Coast Starting XI: 1 Glen Moss (gk); 3 Michael Thwaite; 5 Robson Alves da Silva (substituted off) 20'; 6 Dino Djulbic; 10 Jason Culina (c); 11 Bruce Djite (substituted off) 82'; 13 Bas van den Brink; 16 Kristian Rees; 18 James Brown; 22 Adama Traore; 24 John Curtis; Substitutes: 20 Scott Higgins(gk); 2 Steve Pantelidis (substituted on) 73'; 7 Zenon Caravella (substituted on) 20' (substituted off) 73'; 19 Andrew Barisic (substituted on) 82'	B. van den Brink 22'; D. Djulbic (yellow card) 51'; J. Brown 67' (yellow card) 70'; A. Barisic (yellow card) 84'; K. Rees (yellow card) 90'	(1–0); Report; Summary; 8 Shots 9; 5 Shots on Target 2; 11 Fouls Committed 14; 5 Corners 7; 1 Offsides 1; 56% Possession 44%	(yellow card) 27' V. Lia; (yellow card) 50' B. Sigmund; (yellow card) 52' A. Durante	Attendance: 1,716; Referee: (Australia) Alan Milliner Wellington Starting XI: 1 Mark Paston (gk) (substituted off) 45'; 2 Manny Muscat; 6 Tim Brown; 8 Paul Ifill; 9 Chris Greenacre (substituted off) 69'; 11 Daniel (substituted off) 59'; 13 Troy Hearfield; 15 Jade North; 17 Vince Lia; 18 Ben Sigmund; 22 Andrew Durante (c); Substitutes: 19 Danny Vukovic (gk) (substituted on) 45'; 7 Leo Bertos (substituted on) 69'; 21 Marco Rojas (substituted on) 59'; 23 Dylan Macallister

18 December 2010 Round 21	Wellington Phoenix	4–0	Newcastle Jets	Westpac Stadium, Wellington
19:00 NZDT; 17:00 AEDT Wellington Starting XI: 19 Danny Vukovic (gk); 2 Manny Muscat; 6 Tim Brown; 7 Leo Bertos (substituted off) 68'; 8 Paul Ifill (substituted off) 12'; 13 Troy Hearfield; 15 Jade North; 17 Vince Lia; 18 Ben Sigmund; 21 Marco Rojas (substituted off) 81'; 23 Dylan Macallister; Substitutes: 20 Reece Crowther (gk); 9 Chris Greenacre (substituted on) 12'; 11 Daniel (substituted on) 68'; 12 James Musa (substituted on) 81'	T. Brown 18'; M. Rojas 31'; C. Greenacre 42'; D. Macallister 89'	(3–0); Report; Summary; 13 Shots 14; 5 Shots on Target 6; 12 Fouls Committed 16; 5 Corners 4; 3 Offsides 6; 54% Possession 46%	(yellow card) 20' T. Misura	Attendance: 6,053; Referee: (Australia) Jarred Gillett Newcastle Starting XI: 40 Matthew Nash (gk); 2 Taylor Regan; 3 Adam D'Apuzzo; 4 Nikolai Topor-Stanley (c); 11 Tarek Elrich; 17 Marcello Fiorentini; 18 Marko Jesic; 19 Ali Abbas; 24 Francis Jeffers (substituted off) 71'; 27 Tomislav Misura (substituted off) 46'; 31 Jacob Pepper (substituted off) 46'; Substitutes: 1 Ben Kennedy (gk); 13 Sasho Petrovski (substituted on) 71'; 14 Labinot Haliti (substituted on) 46'; 22 Kaz Patafta (substituted on) 46'

27 December 2010 Round 22	North Queensland Fury	1–1	Wellington Phoenix	Dairy Farmers Stadium, Townsville
19:15 AEST; 22:15 NZDT	C. Payne 12'; A. Kilian (yellow card) 13'	(1–0); Report; Summary; 15 Shots 16; 10 Shots on Target 10; 15 Fouls Committed 10; 12 Corners 8; 0 Offsides 9; 52% Possession 48%	(yellow card) 20' M. Muscat; (yellow card) 74' V. Lia; 77' D. Macallister	Attendance: 5,107; Referee: (Australia) Jarred Gillett

5 January 2011 Round 23	Wellington Phoenix	2–0	Melbourne Victory	Westpac Stadium, Wellington
19:30 NZDT; 17:30 AEDT	M. Muscat (yellow card) 57'; D. Macallister 67'; M. Rojas 72'	(0–0); Summary; 23 Shots 4; 17 Shots on Target 3; 19 Fouls Committed 14; 11 Corners 4; 5 Offsides 3; 61% Possession 39%	(yellow card) 4' T. Pondeljak	Attendance: 9,456; Referee: (Australia) Chris Beath

9 January 2011 Round 24	Central Coast Mariners	1–0	Wellington Phoenix	Bluetongue Stadium, Gosford
17:00 AEDT; 19:00 NZDT	M. McGlinchey 41'	(1–0); Report; Summary; 21 Shots 10; 7 Shots on Target 3; 11 Fouls Committed 14; 4 Corners 3; 3 Offsides 3; 55% Possession 45%	(yellow card) 44' M. Muscat; (yellow card) 82' A. Durante	Attendance: 6,844; Referee: (Australia) Matthew Breeze

23 January 2011 Round 25	Wellington Phoenix	4–0	Perth Glory	Westpac Stadium, Wellington
17:00 NZDT; 13:00 AWST	T. Velaphi 10' (o.g.); D. Macallister 49'; V. Lia 60'; C. Greenacre 90+1'	(1–0); Summary; 18 Shots 11; 7 Shots on Target 3; 7 Fouls Committed 4; 11 Corners 2; 0 Offsides 1; 60% Possession 40%	(yellow card) 34' J. Mitchell	Attendance: 5,115; Referee: (New Zealand) Peter O'Leary

26 January 2011 Round 26	Brisbane Roar	2–0	Wellington Phoenix	Skilled Park, Gold Coast
17:00 AEST; 20:00 NZDT	J. Meyer (yellow card) 75' (goal) 85', 90'	(0–0); Summary; 14 Shots 13; 5 Shots on Target 5; 8 Fouls Committed 16; 5 Corners 4; 4 Offsides 1; 62% Possession 38%	(yellow card) 20' T. Brown; (yellow card) 37' V. Lia; (yellow card) 80' M. Muscat	Attendance: 3,522; Referee: (Australia) Ryan Shepheard

30 January 2011 Round 27	Wellington Phoenix	1–0	Newcastle Jets	Westpac Stadium, Wellington
17:00 NZDT; 15:00 AEDT	D. Macallister 20'; A. Durante (yellow card) 53'; T. Hearfield (yellow card) 56'; V. Lia (yellow card) 67'; B. Sigmund (yellow card) 80'; M. Muscat (yellow card) 82'	(1–0); Report; Summary; 5 Shots 5; 2 Shots on Target 3; 18 Fouls Committed 14; 2 Corners 5; 1 Offsides 7; 48% Possession 52%	(yellow card) 20' A. D'Apuzzo; (yellow card) 26' N. Topor-Stanley; (red card) 66' R. Griffiths	Attendance: 10,917; Referee: (Australia) Chris Beath

5 February 2011 Round 28	Adelaide United	0–1	Wellington Phoenix	Hindmarsh Stadium, Adelaide
18:30 ACST; 21:00 NZDT		(0–1); Report; Summary; 12 Shots 9; 4 Shots on Target 6; 4 Fouls Committed 11; 7 Corners 2; 1 Offsides 1; 48% Possession 52%	35' C. Greenacre; (yellow card) 42' T. Brown; (yellow card) 65' T. Hearfield; (yellow card) 81' A. Durante	Attendance: 7,498; Referee: (Australia) Matthew Breeze

9 February 2011 Round 29	Sydney FC	2–0	Wellington Phoenix	Sydney Football Stadium, Sydney
19:00 AEST; 21:00 NZDT	N. Ward 55' (o.g.); B. Gan 69'	(0–0); Summary		Attendance: 4,732; Referee: (Australia) Peter Green

13 February 2011 Round 30	Wellington Phoenix	3–1	North Queensland Fury	Westpac Stadium, Wellington
17:00 NZDT; 15:00 AEST	C. Greenacre 7'; D. Macallister 11'; D. Vukovic (GK) 90+4' (pen.)	(0–1); Summary; 15 Shots 15; 5 Shots on Target 3; 8 Fouls Committed 10; 6 Corners 6; 3 Offsides 0; 49% Possession 51%	66' (red card) 90+4' B. Studman	Attendance: 12,731; Referee: (New Zealand) Peter O'Leary

=== 2010–11 Finals series ===
18 February 2011 Semi-final 3 v 6	Adelaide United	1–0	Wellington Phoenix	Hindmarsh Stadium, Adelaide
19:00 ACDT; 21:30 NZDT	C. Watson (yellow card) 23'; M. Flores (yellow card) 37'; T. Dodd 70'	(0–0); Summary	(yellow card) 4' M. Muscat; (yellow card) 30' N. Ward	Attendance: 10,285; Referee: (Australia) Jarred Gillett

=== Results by round ===
Round	1	2	3	4	5	6	7	8	9	10	11	12	13	14	15	16	17	18	19	20	21	22	23	24	25	26	27	28	29	30
Ground	H	H	A	A	H	A	A	H	A	H	A	H	A	H	A	H	H	A	H	A	H	A	H	A	H	A	H	A	A	H
Result	D	W	L	L	W	D	L	W	L	D	L	L	W	L	L	W	D	L	W	L	W	D	W	L	W	L	W	W	L	W
Position	7	4	7	8	6	5	6	4	5	6	6	6	7	7	8	7	7	8	5	7	8	7	7	8	7	8	6	6	6	6

Source: Matches
A = Away; H = Home; W = Win; D = Draw; L = Loss

Pos	Team	Pld	W	D	L	GF	GA	GD	Pts	Qualification
1	Brisbane Roar (C)	30	18	11	1	58	26	+32	65	Qualification for 2012 AFC Champions League group stage and Finals series (Note: First place qualifies for the 2012 AFC Champions League group stage. Winning the 2011 A-League Grand Final automatically earns qualification for the 2012 AFC Champions League group stage, unless first place are champions. Second place qualifies for the 2012 AFC Champions League qualifying play-off, unless they qualify for the 2011 A-League Grand Final alongside first place or become A-League Champions, subsequently third place then qualify for the 2012 AFC Champions League qualifying play-off.)
2	Central Coast Mariners	30	16	9	5	50	31	+19	57	Qualification for 2012 AFC Champions League group stage and Finals series
3	Adelaide United	30	15	5	10	51	36	+15	50	Qualification for 2012 AFC Champions League qualifying play-off and Finals series
4	Gold Coast United	30	12	10	8	40	32	+8	46	Qualification for Finals series
5	Melbourne Victory	30	11	10	9	45	39	+6	43	Qualification for Finals series
6	Wellington Phoenix	30	12	5	13	39	41	−2	41	Qualification for Finals series
7	Newcastle Jets	30	9	8	13	29	33	−4	35	
8	Melbourne Heart	30	8	11	11	32	42	−10	35	
9	Sydney FC	30	8	10	12	35	40	−5	34	
10	Perth Glory	30	5	8	17	27	54	−27	23	
11	North Queensland Fury	30	4	7	19	28	60	−32	19	

Source: ultimatealeague.com
Rules for classification: 1) points; 2) goal difference; 3) number of goals scored.
(C) Champions

== Statistics ==
=== Appearances ===
Rank	Player	Minutes played by round																															Total				
Rank	Player	1	2	3	4	5	6	7	8	9	10	11	12	13	14	15	16	17	18	19	20	21	22	23	24	25	26	27	28	29	30	F1	App.	GS	Substituted on	Substituted off	Min.
1	(England) Chris Greenacre	90	90	(substituted off) 80	90	(substituted off) 82	(substituted off) 77	(substituted off) 56	90	(substituted off) 68	90	90	(substituted off) 79	(substituted off) 69	(substituted off) 81	(substituted off) 63	(substituted on) 1	(substituted on) 30	(substituted on) 34	(substituted on) 9	(substituted off) 69	(substituted on) 78	90	(substituted on) 6	(substituted on) 27	(substituted on) 26	(substituted off) 77	(substituted on) 19	90	90	90	(substituted on) 16	31	21	10	11	1,947
2	(New Zealand) Tim Brown	90	90	90	(substituted off) 45	90	90	90	90	90	90	90	90	90	(substituted off) 73		90	90	90	90	90	90	90	90	90	90	90	90	90	90	90	90	30	30	0	2	2,638
3	(Brazil) Daniel	(substituted on) 7	(substituted on) 1		(substituted off) 67		(substituted on) 9	(substituted on) 18	(substituted off) 85	(substituted on) 25	(substituted on) 9	(substituted on) 16	(substituted on) 29	(substituted on) 31	(substituted on) 17	(substituted on) 18	(substituted off) 72	(substituted off) 60	(substituted off) 56	(substituted off) 61	(substituted off) 59	(substituted on) 22	(substituted on) 29	(substituted on) 3	(substituted on) 38	(substituted on) 26	(substituted off) 63	(substituted on) 29	(substituted on) 18	(substituted off) 64	(substituted on) 9	(substituted on) 1	29	9	20	9	942
4	(New Zealand) Ben Sigmund	90	90	90	90	90	90	90	(substituted off) 81	90	90	90	90	90	90	90	90		90	90	90	90	90	90	90	90	90	90			90	90	28	28	0	1	2,511
4	(Malta) Manny Muscat	90	90	90		90	90	90	90	90	90	90	(substituted off) 71	90	90	90	90	90	90	90	90	90	90	90	90	90	90	90			90	90	28	28	0	1	2,501
4	(Australia) Andrew Durante	90	90	90	90	90	90	90	90	90	90	90	90	90	90	90	90	90	90	90	90		(substituted on) 21	90	90	90	90	90	90			90	28	27	1	0	2,451
7	(Australia) Troy Hearfield	(substituted on) 18		(substituted on) 10	90	90		(substituted on) 34	(substituted on) 9	90	90	90			(substituted on) 12	90	90	90	(substituted off) 56	(substituted off) 81	90	90	(substituted off) 69	90	(substituted off) 63	90	90	90	90	90	90	(substituted off) 74	27	22	5	5	1,956
8	(Australia) Vince Lia	90	90	90	90				64		(substituted on) 45	90	(substituted off) 60	90	90	90	90	90	90	90	90	90	90	(substituted off) 82	90	90	90	(substituted off) 71	(substituted off) 72				24	23	1	4	2,014
8	(Australia) Nick Ward				(substituted on) 45	90	90	(substituted off) 72	90	(substituted off) 74	(substituted off) 45	(substituted on) 20	(substituted on) 11			90	(substituted on) 18	(substituted on) 35	(substituted off) 78	(substituted off) 88			(substituted on) 29	90	(substituted off) 56	(substituted off) 64	(substituted on) 27	(substituted off) 61	90	90	90	90	24	17	7	8	1,533
10	(New Zealand) Leo Bertos	(substituted off) 83	(substituted off) 58	90	(substituted on) 23	90	90	90	(substituted off) 89	(substituted off) 65	(substituted off) 81	90	90	(substituted off) 89	90	(substituted off) 72	(substituted off) 89	(substituted off) 55			(substituted on) 21	(substituted off) 68	(substituted off) 61	(substituted on) 8	(substituted on) 34								22	18	4	11	1,526
10	(Australia) Dylan Macallister	(substituted off) 72	(substituted off) 89	(substituted off) 66	(substituted off) 45			(substituted on) 28	(substituted on) 1				(substituted on) 30	(substituted on) 18	(substituted on) 9				(substituted on) 12	(substituted on) 2		90	90	(substituted off) 84	90	(substituted off) 73	(substituted off) 55	90	90	(substituted off) 73	(substituted off) 81	(substituted off) 62	22	15	7	10	1,250
12	(Barbados) Paul Ifill	90	90	90	90	90	(substituted off) 81	90	90	90	90	(substituted off) 74	90	(substituted off) 72	90	90	(substituted off) 89	90	90	90	90	(substituted off) 12										(substituted on) 28	21	21	0	5	1,768
13	(Australia) Jade North						90	90	90	90	(substituted off) 45		90	90	(substituted off) 78		90	90	90	90	90	90	90						90	90	90	90	19	19	0	2	1,653
14	(Australia) Danny Vukovic					90	90	90	90	90											(substituted on) 47	90	90	90	90	90	90	90	90	90	90	90	17	16	1	0	1,487
14	(New Zealand) Marco Rojas													(substituted on) 1			(substituted on) 1	(substituted on) 15	(substituted on) 34	(substituted on) 29	(substituted on) 31	(substituted off) 81	(substituted off) 61	(substituted off) 87	(substituted off) 52	(substituted off) 64	(substituted on) 13	90	90	90	(substituted off) 87	(substituted off) 89	17	10	7	7	915
16	(New Zealand) Tony Lochhead	90	90	90	90	90	90	(substituted off) 62																90	90	90	90	90	90	90	90	90	16	16	0	1	1,412
17	(New Zealand) Mark Paston	90	90	90	90						90	90	90	90	90	90	90	90	90	90	(substituted off) 43												15	15	0	1	1,303
18	(Australia) Mirjan Pavlovic			(substituted on) 24	(substituted on) 45	(substituted on) 8	(substituted on) 13			(substituted on) 26	(substituted on) 45	(substituted off) 70				(substituted on) 27											(substituted on) 35				(substituted on) 3		10	1	9	1	296
19	(Argentina) Oscar Roberto Cornejo		(substituted on) 32						(substituted on) 5	(substituted on) 22																(substituted on) 17				(substituted on) 17			5	0	5	0	93
20	(New Zealand) Simon Elliott												90	90	90	90																	4	4	0	0	360
21	(New Zealand) James Musa																	(substituted off) 75				(substituted on) 9								90			3	2	1	1	174
22	(New Zealand) Sean Lovemore																													(substituted on) 26			1	0	1	0	26
23	(Australia) Reece Crowther																																0	0	0	0	0
23	(Brazil) Diego																																0	0	0	0	0

Player started Player subbed in Player suspended Player injured

=== Goal scorers ===
Rank	Player	Goals by round																															Total
Rank	Player	1	2	3	4	5	6	7	8	9	10	11	12	13	14	15	16	17	18	19	20	21	22	23	24	25	26	27	28	29	30	F1	Total
1	(England) Chris Greenacre	2							1		1											1				1			1		1		8
2	(Barbados) Paul Ifill	1	1			1				1							2	1															7
2	(Australia) Dylan Macallister																		1			1	1	1		1		1			1		7
4	(New Zealand) Tim Brown							1					1	1				1		1		1											6
5	(New Zealand) Leo Bertos		1						1		1																						3
6	(New Zealand) Marco Rojas																					1		1									2
6	(New Zealand) Ben Sigmund				1															1													2
8	(Australia) Nick Ward					1																											1
8	(Australia) Vince Lia																									1							1
8	(Australia) Danny Vukovic																														1		1

Goal scored from penalty kick

=== Goal assists ===
Rank	Player	Total
1	(New Zealand) Marco Rojas	7
2	(New Zealand) Tim Brown	4
2	(England) Chris Greenacre	3
2	(Malta) Manny Muscat	3
2	(Australia) Dylan Macallister	3
6	(Barbados) Paul Ifill	2
6	(New Zealand) Ben Sigmund	2
6	(Australia) Vince Lia	2
7	(Australia) Troy Hearfield	1
7	(New Zealand) Leo Bertos	1
7	(Australia) Andrew Durante	1
7	(Brazil) Daniel	1
7	(Australia) Mirjan Pavlovic	1

=== Discipline ===
Rank	Player	Cards by round																															Total		
Rank	Player	1	2	3	4	5	6	7	8	9	10	11	12	13	14	15	16	17	18	19	20	21	22	23	24	25	26	27	28	29	30	F1	Yellow card	Yellow-red card	Red card
1	(Malta) Manny Muscat							Yellow card						Yellow card				Yellow card					Yellow card	Yellow card	Yellow card		Yellow card	Yellow card				Yellow card	9		
2	(Australia) Vince Lia			Yellow card					Yellow-red card					Yellow card							Yellow card		Yellow card				Yellow card	Yellow card					6	1	
2	(Australia) Andrew Durante	Yellow card		Yellow card										Yellow card						Yellow card	Yellow card				Yellow card			Yellow card	Yellow card				8		
2	(New Zealand) Ben Sigmund	Yellow card			Yellow card		Yellow card		Yellow card								Yellow card		Yellow card		Yellow card							Yellow card					8		
5	(New Zealand) Tim Brown			Yellow card						Yellow card		Yellow card		Yellow card	Yellow card												Yellow card		Yellow card				7		
6	(Barbados) Paul Ifill			Yellow card			Yellow card				Yellow card		Yellow card																				4		
7	(Brazil) Daniel				Yellow card				Yellow card								Yellow card																3		
7	(Australia) Troy Hearfield				Yellow card																							Yellow card	Yellow card				3		
9	(New Zealand) Leo Bertos	Yellow card							Yellow card																								2		
9	(England) Chris Greenacre						Yellow card													Yellow card													2		
9	(Australia) Mirjan Pavlovic			Yellow card						Yellow card																							2		
9	(New Zealand) Tony Lochhead		Yellow card																												Yellow card		2		
9	(Australia) Nick Ward																			Yellow card												Yellow card	2		
14	(Australia) Jade North												Yellow card																				1		
14	(New Zealand) Simon Elliott													Yellow card																			1		

Player suspended

=== Goal times ===
Times in which goals have been scored in the 2010–11 season
nth Min.	Goals for Wellington Phoenix	Goals against Wellington Phoenix
01-05	2	1
06-10	5	2
11–15	2	4
16–20	3	1
21–25	1	2
26–30	0	0
31–35	2	0
36–40	2	3
41–45	1	2
46–50	3	1
51–55	0	2
56–60	3	0
61–65	2	1
66–70	1	8
71–75	5	5
76–80	1	4
81–85	2	2
86–90	4	4

=== Home attendance ===
Date	Round	Attendance	Opposition	Stadium
13 August 2010	Round 1	8,938	Gold Coast United	Westpac Stadium
22 August 2010	Round 2	9,553	Central Coast Mariners	Westpac Stadium
11 September 2010	Round 5	8,453	Sydney FC	Westpac Stadium
24 September 2010	Round 8	7,212	North Queensland Fury	Westpac Stadium
17 October 2010	Round 10	5,211	Melbourne Heart	Westpac Stadium
3 November 2010	Round 12	5,529	Brisbane Roar	Westpac Stadium
13 November 2010	Round 14	5,778	Central Coast Mariners	Westpac Stadium
24 November 2010	Round 16	4,700	Melbourne Heart	Westpac Stadium
27 November 2010	Round 17	6,475	Melbourne Victory	Westpac Stadium
5 December 2010	Round 19	14,108	Adelaide United	AMI Stadium
18 December 2010	Round 21	6,053	Newcastle Jets	Westpac Stadium
5 January 2011	Round 23	9,496	Melbourne Victory	Westpac Stadium
23 January 2011	Round 25	5,115	Perth Glory	Westpac Stadium
30 January 2011	Round 27	10,917	Newcastle Jets	Westpac Stadium
13 February 2011	Round 30	12,731	North Queensland Fury	Westpac Stadium
Total	120,238			
Average	8,016			

== Club ==
=== Technical staff ===
- First team coach: (New Zealand) Ricki Herbert
- Technical analyst: (Australia) Luciano Trani
- First team physiotherapist: (New Zealand) Adam Crump
- Masseur: (New Zealand) Dene Carroll
- Strength & conditioning coach: (England) Ed Baranowski

=== Kit ===
Supplier: Reebok
Sponsor(s): Sony

Home	Away	Goalkeeper home	Goalkeeper away

=== End-of-season awards ===
See also List of Wellington Phoenix FC end-of-season awards

- Sony Player of the Year: Ben Sigmund
- Members' Player of the Year: Manny Muscat
- Players' Player of the Year: Manny Muscat
- Media Player of the Year: Marco Rojas
- Golden Boot: Chris Greenacre – 8 goals
- Under-23 Player of the Year: Marco Rojas
