= 2009–10 Wellington Phoenix FC season =

Wellington Phoenix FC
2009–10 season
- CEO: Tony Pignata
- Chairman: Terry Serepisos
- Manager: Ricki Herbert
- A-League: 4th
- Finals: 3rd
- Top goalscorer: Paul Ifill; 13 Goals
- Highest home attendance: 32,792 v Newcastle; 7 March 2010
- Lowest home attendance: 4,115 v Newcastle; 4 November 2009
- Average home league attendance: 8,942
- Biggest win: 6–0 v Gold Coast United
- Biggest defeat: 1–4 v Brisbane Roar
Home colours	Away colours

The 2009–10 season is the Wellington Phoenix's third season of football in the Hyundai A-League, making it the longest running New Zealand team in the competition, surpassing the defunct New Zealand Knights.

== Players ==
=== First team squad ===
Note: Flags indicate national team as defined under FIFA eligibility rules; some limited exceptions apply. Players may hold more than one non-FIFA nationality.

No.	Pos.	Nation	Player
1	GK	NZL	Mark Paston
2	DF	MLT	Manny Muscat
3	DF	NZL	Tony Lochhead
4	DF	AUS	Jon McKain
5	MF	BRA	Diego
6	MF	NZL	Tim Brown (Vice-Captain)
7	MF	NZL	Leo Bertos
8	FW	BRB	Paul Ifill
9	FW	ENG	Chris Greenacre
10	MF	AUS	Michael Ferrante
11	MF	BRA	Daniel
13	MF	AUS	Troy Hearfield

No.	Pos.	Nation	Player
14	MF	AUS	Adrian Caceres
15	FW	CIV	Eugene Dadi (Short-term contract)
16	DF	NZL	David Mulligan
17	MF	AUS	Vince Lia
18	DF	NZL	Ben Sigmund
19	MF	CHN	Jiang Chen (On loan)
20	GK	AUS	Reece Crowther (Youth)
21	MF	NZL	Marco Rojas (Youth)
22	DF	AUS	Andrew Durante (Captain)
23	FW	NZL	Kosta Barbarouses (Youth)
40	GK	AUS	Liam Reddy (Short-term injury cover)

=== Transfers ===
==== In ====
No.	Pos.	Player	From	Notes
5	MF	(Brazil) Diego	(Australia) Adelaide United	
8	FW	(Barbados) Paul Ifill	(England) Crystal Palace	
9	FW	(England) Chris Greenacre	(England) Tranmere Rovers	
14	MF	(Australia) Adrián Cáceres	(Australia) Central Coast Mariners	
15	FW	(Ivory Coast) Eugene Dadi	(Australia) Perth Glory	
19	MF	(China) Jiang Chen	(China) Tianjin Teda F.C.	On loan
20	GK	(Australia) Reece Crowther	(England) Queens Park Rangers	
21	MF	(New Zealand) Marco Rojas	(New Zealand) Waikato FC	
40	GK	(Australia) Liam Reddy	(Australia) Brisbane Roar	Short-term injury cover

==== Out ====
No.	Pos.	Player	From	Notes
2	DF	(New Zealand) Jeremy Christie	(New Zealand) Waitakere United	
5	DF	(Australia) Karl Dodd	(Australia) North Queensland Fury	
8	FW	(New Zealand) Vaughan Coveny	(Australia) South Melbourne FC	
9	FW	(New Zealand) Shane Smeltz	(Australia) Gold Coast United	
12	MF	(Australia) Richard Johnson	Retired	
15	FW	(Australia) Adam Kwasnik	(Australia) Central Coast Mariners	
19	FW	(New Zealand) Greg Draper	(Australia) Melbourne Knights FC	
20	GK	(New Zealand) Glen Moss	(Australia) Melbourne Victory	
21	MF	(China) Leilei Gao	(China) Beijing Hongdeng	

== Matches ==
=== 2009–10 Pre-season friendlies ===
May 2009	Wellington Phoenix (New Zealand)	2–0	(New Zealand) Western Suburbs FC	Porirua Park, Porirua

27 June 2009	Wellington Phoenix (New Zealand)	1–1	(Australia) Melbourne Victory	Queenstown Events Centre, Queenstown
17:30 NZST	T. Hearfield 77'

5 July 2009	Cantebury Mainland XI (New Zealand)	1–1	(New Zealand) Wellington Phoenix	Queen Elizabeth II Park, Christchurch
14:00 NZST

18 July 2009	Tianjin Teda F.C. (China)	2–2	(New Zealand) Wellington Phoenix	TEDA Football Stadium, Tianjin
			Brown 15'; Sigmund 36'

21 July 2009	Guangzhou Evergrande F.C. (China)	3–2	(New Zealand) Wellington Phoenix	Zhuzhou
			56' C. Greenacre; 81' A. Durante

25 July 2009	Central Coast Mariners (Australia)	0–0	(New Zealand) Wellington Phoenix	Apex Oval, Dubbo

=== 2009–10 Hyundai A-League fixtures ===
9 August 2009 Round 1	Newcastle Jets	3–2	Wellington Phoenix	EnergyAustralia Stadium, Newcastle
15:00 AEST; 17:00 NZST	J. Hoffman 12', 23'; A. D'Apuzzo (yellow card) 20'; L. Milicevic (yellow card) 73'; J. Naidovski 84'	(2–2); Report; Summary	26' B. Sigmund; 43' C. Greenacre; (yellow card) 48' J. McKain; (yellow card) 52' T. Lochhead	Attendance: 6,655; Referee: (Australia) Chris Beath

16 August 2009 Round 2	Wellington Phoenix	2–1	Perth Glory	Westpac Stadium, Wellington
19:30 NZST	M. Ferrante (yellow card) 2'; P. Ifill 24'; L. Bertos 85'	(1–1); Report; Summary	3' V. Sikora; (yellow card) 78' W. Srhoj; (yellow card) 84' A. Pellegrino	Attendance: 10,024; Referee: (New Zealand) Peter O'Leary

23 August 2009 Round 3	Brisbane Roar	1–1	Wellington Phoenix	Suncorp Stadium, Brisbane
15:00 AEST; 17:00 NZST	S. van Dijk 10'; D. Tiatto (yellow card) 57'; B. Malcolm (yellow card) 61'; C. Moore (yellow card) 75'; T. Oar (yellow card) 86' (yellow-red card) 88'; M. Nichols (yellow card) 90'; R. Kruse (yellow card) 90'	(1–0); Report; Summary	(yellow card) 45' M. Muscat; (yellow card) 67' M. Ferrante; 85' C. Greenacre	Attendance: 7,084; Referee: (Australia) Chris Beath

30 August 2009 Round 4	Sydney FC	2–0	Wellington Phoenix	Sydney Football Stadium, Sydney
17:00 AEST; 19:00 NZST	B. Gan 77'; J. Aloisi 81'	(0–0); Report; Summary	(yellow card) 22' P. Ifill	Attendance: 11,718; Referee: (Australia) Strebre Delovski

4 September 2009 Round 5	Wellington Phoenix	1–1	Adelaide United	Westpac Stadium, Wellington
19:30 NZST; 17:00 ACDT	Ifill 35'; B. Sigmund (yellow card) 41'; V. Lia (yellow card) 56'; T. Brown (yellow card) 74'	(1–1); Report; Summary	(yellow card) 39' M. Marrone; 42' (yellow card) 63' I. Fyfe; (yellow card) 44' M. Rudan	Attendance: 7,523; Referee: (New Zealand) Michael Hester

13 September 2009 Round 6	Melbourne Victory	1–1	Wellington Phoenix	Etihad Stadium, Melbourne
17:00 AEST; 19:00 NZST	C. Hernández 4'; N. Fabiano (yellow card) 14'; M. Kemp (yellow card) 82'	(1–1); Report; Summary	30' (yellow card) 90' T. Brown	Attendance: 17,644; Referee: (Australia) Craig Zetter

20 September 2009 Round 7	Wellington Phoenix	1–1	North Queensland Fury	Westpac Stadium, Wellington
15:00 NZST; 13:00 AEST	L. Bertos 7' (yellow card) 88'; A. Durante (yellow card) 27'	(1–0); Report; Summary	(yellow card) 31' D. McBreen; (yellow card) 90'S. Stefanutto; 90' C. Grossman	Attendance: 9,713; Referee: (Australia) Peter Green

27 September 2009 Round 8	Wellington Phoenix	0–0	Central Coast Mariners	Westpac Stadium, Wellington
16:00 NZDT; 13:00 AEST	A. Durante (yellow card) 37'; M. Muscat (yellow card) 42'; T. Brown (yellow card) 70'	(0–0); Report; Summary	(yellow card) 64' D. Macallister; (yellow card) 90' A. Wilkinson	Attendance: 6,769; Referee: (New Zealand) Michael Hester

2 October 2009 Round 9	Gold Coast United	0–0	Wellington Phoenix	Skilled Park, Gold Coast
20:00 AEST; 23:00 NZDT	Robson (yellow card) 89'	(0–0); Report; Summary	(yellow card) 89' V. Lia	Attendance: 4,209; Referee: (Australia) Gerard Parsons

17 October 2009 Round 10	North Queensland Fury	1–1	Wellington Phoenix	Dairy Farmers Stadium, Townsville
19:30 AEST; 22:30 NZDT	C. Grossman (yellow card) 35'; D. McBreen (yellow card) 74'; D. Daal (yellow card) 76'; R. Fowler 85'	(0–1); Report; Summary	6' T. Brown; (yellow card) 48' A. Durante; (yellow card) 78' T. Lochhead	Attendance: 6,191; Referee: (Australia) Chris Beath

25 October 2009 Round 11	Wellington Phoenix	6–0	Gold Coast United	Westpac Stadium, Wellington
17:00 NZDT; 14:00 AEST	Daniel 28', 53'; T. Brown 48' (yellow card) 56'; C. Greenacre (yellow card) 29' (goal) 54'; P. Ifill 59'; J. Chen (yellow card) 78'; T. Hearfield 82'	(1–0); Report; Summary	(yellow card) 38' S. Pantelidis; (yellow card) 88' Robson	Attendance: 6,571; Referee: (Australia) Chris Beath

1 November 2009 Round 12	Sydney FC	3–1	Wellington Phoenix	Sydney Football Stadium, Sydney
17:00 AEDT; 19:00 NZDT	M. Bridge 15', 35'; S. Corica (yellow card) 30' (goal) 32'; S. Colosimo (yellow card) 60'; K. Kisel (yellow card) 71'; S. Musialik (yellow card) 90'	(3–0); Report; Summary	(yellow card) 39' V. Lia; 81' K. Barbarouses	Attendance: 10,653; Referee: (Australia) Gerard Parsons

4 November 2009 Round 13	Wellington Phoenix	3–0	Newcastle Jets	Westpac Stadium, Wellington
18:00 NZDT; 16:00 AEDT	T. Brown 28'; V. Lia (yellow card) 52'; C. Greenacre 55'; P. Ifill 90'	(1–0); Report; Summary	(yellow card) 21' A. Costanzo	Attendance: 4,100; Referee: (Australia) Ben Williams

8 November 2009 Round 14	Wellington Phoenix	1–1	Perth Glory	Westpac Stadium, Wellington
17:00 NZDT; 15:00 AEDT	P. Ifill (yellow card) 18' (goal) 82'; V. Lia (yellow card) 35'; B. Sigmund (yellow card) 75'	(0–0); Report; Summary	(yellow card) 63' (goal) 70' W. Srhoj; (yellow card) 81' J. Burns	Attendance: 6,930; Referee: (Australia) Matthew Gillett

22 November 2009 Round 15	Newcastle Jets	0–1	Wellington Phoenix	Energy Australia Stadium
17:00 AEDT; 15:00 NZDT	J. Wheelhouse (yellow card) 33'; F. Vignaroli (yellow card) 36'	(0–1); Report; Summary	14' P. Ifill	Attendance: 4,329; Referee: (Australia) Peter Green

29 November 2009 Round 16	Brisbane Roar	4–1	Wellington Phoenix	Suncorp Stadium, Brisbane
19:00 AEST; 22:00 NZDT	Reinaldo 17', 56'; J. McCloughan (yellow card) 69'; C. Miller (yellow card) 78'; S. van Dijk 79'; D. Dodd 90+1'	(1–1); Report; Summary	27' C. Greenacre; (red card) 58' M. Muscat; (yellow card) 72' L. Bertos	Attendance: 6,307; Referee: (Australia) Alan Milliner

4 December 2009 Round 17	Wellington Phoenix	1–1	Melbourne Victory	Westpac Stadium, Wellington
17:30 NZDT; 19:30 AEDT	V. Lia (yellow card) 6'; T. Brown 58'	(0–0); Summary	(yellow card) 25' (yellow-red card) 40' N. Ward; (yellow card) 30' M. Kemp; 87' R. Vargas	Attendance: 8,206; Referee: (New Zealand) Michael Hester

12 December 2009 Round 18	Wellington Phoenix	0–1	Sydney FC	FMG Stadium, Palmerston North
17:00 NZDT; 15:00 AEDT	J. McKain (yellow card) 15'; V. Lia (yellow card) 34'; Daniel (yellow card) 90'	(0–1); Report; Summary	16' (pen.) (yellow card) 71' S. Corica; (yellow card) 78' A. Brosque; (red card) 80' S. Colosimo; (yellow card) 84' C. Bolton	Attendance: 6,459; Referee: (New Zealand) Michael Hester

18 December 2009 Round 19	Adelaide United	1–1	Wellington Phoenix	Hindmarsh Stadium, Adelaide
20:00 ACDT; 22:30 NZDT	Alemao 57'; M. Leckie (yellow card) 70'	(0–0); Report; Summary	(yellow card) 45' L. Bertos; 77' (o.g.) E. Galekovic; (yellow card) 78' T. Lochhead	Attendance: 9,070; Referee: (Australia) Craig Zetter

31 December 2009 Round 20	Central Coast Mariners	0–2	Wellington Phoenix	Bluetongue Stadium, Gosford
18:00 AEDT; 20:00 NZDT	M. Simon (yellow card) 51'; N. Mrdja (yellow card) 61'	(0–0); Report; Summary	47' (pen.), 81' P. Ifill; (yellow card) 58' J. McKain; (yellow card) 90' T. Hearfield	Attendance: 11,137; Referee: (Australia) Matthew Breeze

9 January 2010 Round 21	Wellington Phoenix	3–1	Brisbane Roar	Westpac Stadium, Wellington
17:00 NZDT; 15:00 AEST	T. Brown 26'; E. Dadi 56', 62'; T. Hearfield (yellow card) 68'; L. Reddy (yellow card) 88'	(1–0); Report; Summary	88' S. van Dijk; (yellow card) 88' Reinaldo	Attendance: 8,927; Referee: (New Zealand) Peter O'Leary

15 January 2010 Round 22	Wellington Phoenix	3–0	North Queensland Fury	Westpac Stadium, Wellington
19:30 NZDT; 16:30 AEST	M. Muscat (yellow card) 29'; E. Dadi 47'; T. Brown (yellow card) 55'; P. Ifill 78'; J. McKain 90'	(0–0); Summary	(yellow card) 35' R. Fowler; (yellow card) 46' C. Tadrosse; (yellow card) 86' M. Smith	Attendance: 7,727; Referee: (Australia) Peter Green

22 January 2010 Round 23	Perth Glory	2–0	Wellington Phoenix	Members Equity Stadium, Perth
18:00 AWST; 23:00 NZDT	D. McBreen 23'; T. Howarth 42'; N. Sekulovski (yellow card) 72'; S. Bulloch (yellow card) 83'	(2–0); Summary	(yellow card) 8' T. Brown; (yellow card) 25' E. Dadi; (yellow card) 61' M. Muscat; (yellow card) 72' V. Lia	Attendance: 9,368; Referee: (Australia) Ryan Shepheard

26 January 2010 Round 24	Melbourne Victory	4–0	Wellington Phoenix	Etihad Stadium, Melbourne
18:00 AEDT; 20:00 NZDT	T. Brown 17' (o.g.); A. Thompson 50'; C. Hernandez 66'; L. Broxham (yellow card) 71'; M. Kemp 87'	(1–0); Report; Summary	(yellow card) 29' T. Brown; (yellow card) 34' J. McKain	Attendance: 18,819; Referee: (Australia) Chris Beath

30 January 2010 Round 25	Wellington Phoenix	1–0	Adelaide United	AMI Stadium, Christchurch
17:00 NZDT; 14:30 ACDT	P. Ifill (yellow card) 16'; J. McKain 22'; L. Bertos (yellow card) 80'; T. Hearfield (yellow card) 90'	(1–0); Report; Summary	(yellow card) 26' A. Hughes; (yellow card) 41' R. Cornthwaite	Attendance: 19,279; Referee: (New Zealand) Peter O'Leary

7 February 2010 Round 26	Gold Coast United	0–1	Wellington Phoenix	Skilled Park, Gold Coast
18:00 AEST; 21:00 NZDT	C. Miller (yellow card) 20'; Z. Caravella (yellow card) 41'; Anderson (yellow card) 44'	(0–1); Report; Summary	(yellow card) 21' M. Muscat; (yellow card) 42' A. Durante; 45+2' (pen.) P. Ifill	Attendance: 4,202; Referee: (Australia) Matthew Breeze

12 February 2010 Round 27	Wellington Phoenix	3–0	Central Coast Mariners	Westpac Stadium, Wellington
17:30 NZDT; 15:30 AEDT	T. Brown 14'; V. Lia (yellow card) 68'; P. Ifill 79', 81'; T. Hearfield (yellow card) 82'	(1–0); Report; Summary	(yellow card) 75' M. Simon; (yellow card) 83' A. Clark	Attendance: 14,327; Referee: (Australia) Chris Beath

=== 2009–10 Finals series ===
21 February 2010 Semi Final 4 v 5	Wellington Phoenix	1–1 (a.e.t.)	Perth Glory	Westpac Stadium, Wellington
17:00 NZST	J. McKain (yellow card) 32' (yellow-red card) 105'; C. Greenacre 37'; E. Dadi (yellow card) 118' P. Ifill (penalty scored); A. Durante (penalty scored); T. Brown (penalty scored); A. Caceres (penalty scored)	(1–0); Report; Summary Penalties; 4–2	(yellow card) 21' S. Srhoj; (yellow card) 31' (goal) 67' S. Neville; (yellow card) 60' A. Todd; (yellow card) 72' J. Burns (penalty scored) S. McGarry; (penalty missed) N. Sekulovski; (penalty missed) S. Bulloch; (penalty scored) D. McBreen	Attendance: 24,267; Referee: (Australia) Strebre Delovski

7 March 2010 Minor Semi Final	Wellington Phoenix	3–1 (a.e.t.)	Newcastle Jets	Westpac Stadium, Wellington
16:00 NZST	T. Brown 33'; A. Durante (yellow card) 98'; P. Ifill 105'; M. Muscat (yellow card) 112'; E. Dadi 115'	(1–1); Report; Summary	20' M. Thompson; (yellow card) 35' A. D'Apuzzo; (yellow card) 45+1' J. Wheelhouse; (yellow card) 88' A. Abbas	Attendance: 32,792; Referee: (Australia) Matthew Breeze

13 March 2010 Preliminary Final	Sydney FC	4–2	Wellington Phoenix	Sydney Football Stadium, Sydney
20:00 AEST	C. Payne 22', 31' (yellow card) 84'; A. Brosque 63'; T. McFlynn (yellow card) 66'; M. Bridge 71'	(2–1); Report; Summary	27' A. Durante; 81' E. Dadi	Attendance: 13,196; Referee: (Australia) Peter Green

=== Results by round ===
Round	1	2	3	4	5	6	7	8	9	10	11	12	13	14	15	16	17	18	19	20	21	22	23	24	25	26	27
Ground	A	H	A	A	H	A	H	H	A	A	H	A	H	H	A	A	H	H	A	A	H	H	A	A	H	A	H
Result	L	W	D	L	D	D	D	D	D	D	W	L	W	D	W	L	D	L	D	W	W	W	L	L	W	W	W
Position	6	5	4	7	7	8	9	8	8	8	8	7	6	6	6	6	7	7	8	8	7	5	5	6	5	4	4

Source: Matches
A = Away; H = Home; W = Win; D = Draw; L = Loss

Pos	Team	Pld	W	D	L	GF	GA	GD	Pts	Qualification
1	Sydney FC (C)	27	15	3	9	35	23	+12	48	Qualification for 2011 AFC Champions League group stage and Finals series
2	Melbourne Victory	27	14	5	8	47	32	+15	47	Qualification for 2011 AFC Champions League group stage and Finals series
3	Gold Coast United	27	13	5	9	39	35	+4	44	Qualification for Finals series
4	Wellington Phoenix	27	10	10	7	37	29	+8	40	Qualification for Finals series
5	Perth Glory	27	11	6	10	40	34	+6	39	Qualification for Finals series
6	Newcastle Jets	27	10	4	13	33	45	−12	34	Qualification for Finals series
7	North Queensland Fury	27	8	8	11	29	46	−17	32	
8	Central Coast Mariners	27	7	9	11	32	29	+3	30	
9	Brisbane Roar	27	8	6	13	32	42	−10	30	
10	Adelaide United	27	7	8	12	24	33	−9	29	

Source: ultimatealeague.com
Rules for classification: 1) points; 2) goal difference; 3) number of goals scored.
(C) Champions

== Statistics ==
=== Appearances ===
Rank	Player	Minutes played by round																														Total				
Rank	Player	1	2	3	4	5	6	7	8	9	10	11	12	13	14	15	16	17	18	19	20	21	22	23	24	25	26	27	F1	F2	F3	App.	GS	Substituted on	Substituted off	Min.
1	(Australia) Andrew Durante	90	90	90	90	90	90	90	90	90	90	90	90	90	90	90	90	90	90	90	90	90	90	90	90	90	90	90	120	120	90	30	30	0	0	2,760
1	(Barbados) Paul Ifill	(substituted off) 69	(substituted off) 74	(substituted off) 89	90	90	90	(substituted off) 56	(substituted off) 74	90	90	(substituted off) 67	90	90	90	(substituted off) 85	90	90	90	90	(substituted off) 84	(substituted off) 78	90	90	(substituted off) 72	90	90	90	120	120	(substituted off) 79	30	30	0	11	2,597
1	(New Zealand) Leo Bertos	90	90	90	90	(substituted off) 84	(substituted off) 64	90	(substituted off) 84	(substituted off) 89	(substituted off) 87	(substituted off) 71	(substituted off) 63	(substituted on) 13	(substituted on) 23	(substituted off) 71	(substituted off) 78	90	90	90	90	90	90	(substituted off) 55	(substituted on) 26	(substituted on) 23	(substituted on) 33	(substituted off) 77	(substituted off) 70	(substituted off) 66	90	30	25	5	13	2,157
4	(Australia) Troy Hearfield	(substituted off) 78	(substituted on) 16	(substituted on) 1	(substituted on) 15	(substituted on) 7	(substituted on) 26	(substituted on) 34	(substituted on) 6		(substituted off) 77	(substituted on) 19	(substituted on) 13	(substituted on) 3	(substituted on) 14	(substituted on) 5	(substituted on) 28	90	90	90	90	90	90	90	90	90	90	90	120	(substituted off) 74	(substituted off) 58	29	16	13	4	1,584
5	(New Zealand) Tony Lochhead	90	90	90	90	90	90	90	90	90	90	90	90	90	90	90	90	90	90	90	90	90	90			90	90	90	(substituted off) 75	120	90	28	28	0	1	2,535
6	(New Zealand) Tim Brown	90				90	90	90	90	90	90	90	(substituted off) 77	90	90	90	90	90	90	90	(substituted off) 74	90	90	90	90	90	90	90	120	120	(substituted off) 65	27	27	0	3	2,436
7	(Malta) Manny Muscat	90	90	90	90		90	(substituted off) 75	90	90	(substituted on) 13	90	90	90	90	90	58				90	90	90	90	90	90	(substituted off) 66	(substituted off) 67	120	120	90	26	25	1	3	2,229
7	(Australia) Vince Lia		(substituted on) 13	(substituted on) 21	(substituted on) 47	90	90	90	90	90	90	90	90	90	90		90	90	90	90	90	(substituted off) 82	90	(substituted off) 88			90	90	120	(substituted off) 109	90	26	23	3	3	2,190
9	(England) Chris Greenacre	90	90	90	(substituted off) 75	90	90	90	90	90	90	90	90	(substituted off) 87	(substituted off) 67	90	(substituted off) 70							(substituted on) 26	90	90	90	(substituted off) 84	(substituted off) 106	120	90	24	23	1	6	1,985
10	(Brazil) Daniel	(substituted on) 21	(substituted on) 16	(substituted on) 21	(substituted on) 10	90	(substituted off) 77	(substituted off) 66		(substituted off) 80	(substituted off) 72	(substituted off) 71	90	(substituted off) 77	(substituted off) 76	(substituted off) 63	(substituted off) 62	(substituted off) 85	90	(substituted off) 64						(substituted on) 13		(substituted on) 13		(substituted on) 54	(substituted on) 32	22	14	8	11	1,243
11	(New Zealand) Ben Sigmund	90	90	90	90	(substituted off) 83		90	90	90	90	90	90	90	90	90	90	90						(substituted off) 64	(substituted off) 64				(substituted on) 14	120		20	19	1	3	1,695
12	(Australia) Jon McKain	90	(substituted off) 77	90	90	90	(substituted off) 89											(substituted on) 5	90	90	90	90	90	90	90	90	90	90	105		90	19	18	1	2	1,626
12	(Australia) Adrian Caceres							(substituted on) 24	(substituted off) 57	(substituted on) 1		(substituted on) 19		(substituted on) 2	(substituted on) 20	(substituted on) 27	(substituted on) 12	(substituted off) 56	(substituted off) 67	(substituted on) 14	(substituted off) 89	(substituted on) 12		(substituted on) 35	(substituted on) 26	(substituted off) 77	(substituted off) 57	(substituted on) 23	(substituted on) 50			19	6	13	6	668
14	(New Zealand) Mark Paston	90	90	90		90	90	90	90	90	90	90	(substituted off) 8			90		90														13	13	0	1	1,088
14	(New Zealand) Kosta Barbarouses								(substituted on) 33	(substituted on) 10			(substituted on) 27	(substituted off) 88	(substituted off) 70	(substituted on) 19	(substituted on) 20	(substituted on) 34	(substituted on) 23	(substituted off) 76	(substituted on) 6		(substituted on) 22		(substituted on) 18							13	3	10	3	446
16	(Australia) Liam Reddy																			90	90	90	90	90	90	90	90	90	120	120	90	12	12	0	0	1,140
16	(Brazil) Diego	(substituted on) 12	(substituted off) 74	(substituted off) 69	(substituted off) 43	(substituted on) 6										90					(substituted on) 16	(substituted on) 8		(substituted on) 2	90					(substituted on) 11	(substituted on) 10	12	5	7	3	431
18	(Ivory Coast) Eugene Dadi																					90	(substituted off) 68	90	(substituted off) 64	(substituted off) 67	(substituted on) 24	(substituted on) 6	(substituted on) 45	(substituted on) 46	(substituted on) 25	10	5	5	3	525
19	(Australia) Reece Crowther				90								(substituted on) 82	90	90		90		90													6	5	1	0	532
19	(Australia) Michael Ferrante		90	(substituted off) 69	(substituted off) 80		(substituted on) 1	(substituted on) 15			(substituted on) 18																					6	3	3	3	273
21	(New Zealand) Marco Rojas						(substituted on) 13		(substituted on) 16											(substituted on) 26	(substituted on) 1											4	0	4	0	56
22	(China) Jiang Chen										(substituted on) 3	(substituted on) 23																				2	0	2	0	26
23	(New Zealand) David Mulligan																															0	0	0	0	0

Player started
Player subbed in
Player suspended
Player injured/sick
Player on international duty
Player left club/not signed/loan expired

=== Goal scorers ===
Rank	Player	Goals by round																														Total
Rank	Player	1	2	3	4	5	6	7	8	9	10	11	12	13	14	15	16	17	18	19	20	21	22	23	24	25	26	27	F1	F2	F3	Total
1	(Barbados) Paul Ifill		1			1						1		1	1	1					2		1				1	2		1		13
2	(New Zealand) Tim Brown						1				1	1		1				1				1						1		1		8
3	(England) Chris Greenacre	1		1								1		1			1												1			6
4	(Ivory Coast) Eugene Dadi																					2	1							1	1	5
5	(Brazil) Daniel											2																				2
5	(New Zealand) Leo Bertos		1					1																								2
5	(Australia) Jon McKain																						1			1						2
8	(New Zealand) Ben Sigmund	1																														1
8	(Australia) Troy Hearfield											1																				1
8	(New Zealand) Kosta Barbarouses												1																			1
8	(Australia) Andrew Durante																														1	1

Goal scored from penalty kick

=== Goal assists ===
Rank	Player	Assists by round																														Total
Rank	Player	1	2	3	4	5	6	7	8	9	10	11	12	13	14	15	16	17	18	19	20	21	22	23	24	25	26	27	F1	F2	F3	Total
1	(Barbados) Paul Ifill										1	3										1	1			1				1	1	9
2	(New Zealand) Leo Bertos	2	1			1								1			1	1					1									8
3	(Brazil) Daniel			1			1					1	1																			4
3	(Australia) Adrian Caceres											1			1					1	1											4
5	(Malta) Manny Muscat																					1						1	1			3
6	(New Zealand) Kosta Barbarouses													2																		2
6	(Australia) Andrew Durante							1														1										2
6	(New Zealand) Tim Brown																										1			1		2
6	(Australia) Vince Lia											1																			1	2
10	(New Zealand) Tony Lochhead															1																1
10	(England) Chris Greenacre																											1				1
10	(Brazil) Diego																													1		1

=== Discipline ===
Rank	Player	Cards by round																														Total		
Rank	Player	1	2	3	4	5	6	7	8	9	10	11	12	13	14	15	16	17	18	19	20	21	22	23	24	25	26	27	F1	F2	F3	Yellow card	Yellow-red card	Red card
1	(Malta) Manny Muscat			Yellow card					Yellow card								Red card						Yellow card	Yellow card			Yellow card			Yellow card		6		1
1	(Australia) Vince Lia					Yellow card				Yellow card			Yellow card	Yellow card	Yellow card			Yellow card	Yellow card					Yellow card				Yellow card				9		
3	(New Zealand) Tim Brown					Yellow card	Yellow card		Yellow card			Yellow card											Yellow card	Yellow card	Yellow card							7		
4	(Australia) Jon McKain	Yellow card																	Yellow card		Yellow card				Yellow card				Yellow-red card			4	1	
5	(Australia) Andrew Durante							Yellow card	Yellow card		Yellow card																Yellow card			Yellow card		5		
6	(New Zealand) Leo Bertos							Yellow card									Yellow card			Yellow card						Yellow card						4		
6	(Australia) Troy Hearfield																				Yellow card	Yellow card				Yellow card		Yellow card				4		
8	(Barbados) Paul Ifill				Yellow card										Yellow card											Yellow card						3		
8	(New Zealand) Tony Lochhead	Yellow card									Yellow card									Yellow card												3		
10	(Ivory Coast) Eugene Dadi																							Yellow card					Yellow card			2		
10	(Australia) Michael Ferrante		Yellow card	Yellow card																												2		
10	(New Zealand) Ben Sigmund					Yellow card									Yellow card																	2		
13	(China) Jiang Chen											Yellow card																				1		
13	(Brazil) Daniel																		Yellow card													1		
13	(England) Chris Greenacre											Yellow card																				1		
13	(Australia) Liam Reddy																					Yellow card										1		

=== Goal times ===
Times in which goals have been scored in the 2009–10 season
nth Min.	Goals for Wellington Phoenix	Goals against Wellington Phoenix
01-05	0	2
06-10	2	1
11–15	2	2
16–20	0	4
21–25	2	3
26–30	7	0
31–35	2	3
36–40	1	0
41–45	2	2
46–50	3	1
51–55	3	0
56–60	3	2
61–65	1	1
66–70	0	3
71–75	0	1
76–80	3	2
81–85	8	3
86–90	2	5
In e.t.	2	0

=== Home attendance ===
Date	Round	Attendance	Opposition	Stadium
16 August 2009	Round 2	1	Perth Glory	Westpac Stadium
4 September 2009	Round 5	7,578	Adelaide United	Westpac Stadium
20 September 2009	Round 7	9,713	North Queensland Fury	Westpac Stadium
27 September 2009	Round 8	6,769	Central Coast Mariners	Westpac Stadium
25 October 2009	Round 11	6,517	Gold Coast United	Westpac Stadium
4 November 2009	Round 13	4,115	Newcastle Jets	Westpac Stadium
8 November 2009	Round 14	6,930	Perth Glory	Westpac Stadium
4 December 2009	Round 17	8,209	Melbourne Victory	Westpac Stadium
12 December 2009	Round 18	6,459	Sydney FC	FMG Stadium
9 January 2010	Round 21	8,925	Brisbane Roar	Westpac Stadium
15 January 2010	Round 22	7,727	North Queensland Fury	Westpac Stadium
30 January 2010	Round 25	19,258	Adelaide United	AMI Stadium
12 February 2010	Round 27	14,327	Central Coast Mariners	Westpac Stadium
21 February 2010	Semi-Final 4 v 5	24,278	Perth Glory	Westpac Stadium
7 March 2010	Minor Semi-Final	32,792	Newcastle Jets	Westpac Stadium
Total	173,639			
Average	11,576			

== Club ==
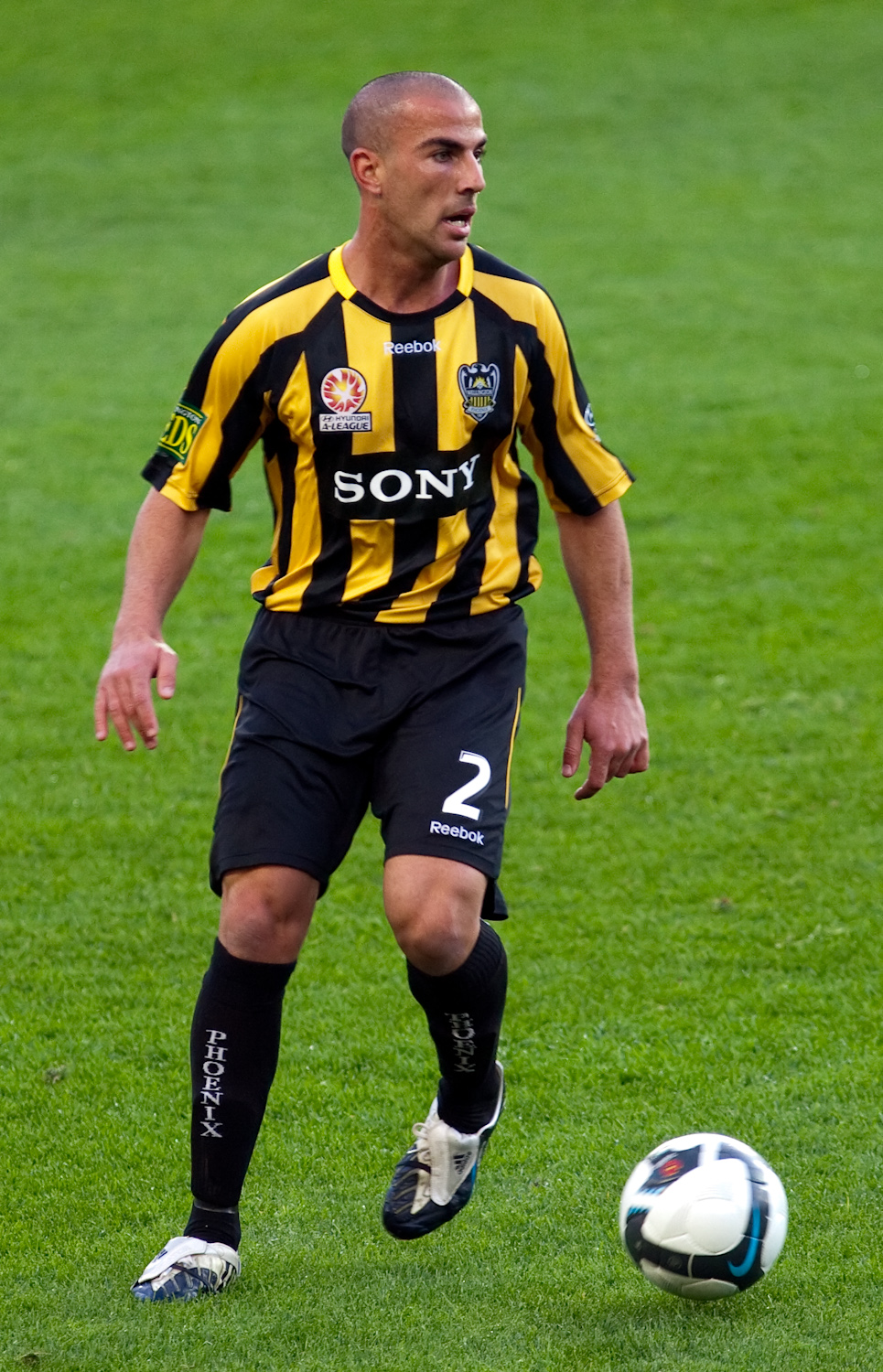
Manny Muscat in the club's home strip

=== Technical staff ===
- First team Coach: (New Zealand) Ricki Herbert
- Goalkeeping Coach: (Scotland) Jonathan Gould
- Technical Analyst: (Australia) Luciano Trani
- First team Physiotherapist: (New Zealand) Adam Crump
- Masseur: (New Zealand) Dene Carroll
- Strength & Conditioning Coach: (England) Ed Baranowski

=== Kit ===
The team kit for the 2009–10 season was produced by Reebok. The home kit was changed to a black and yellow vertically striped shirt with black shorts and socks. The away kit features black sleeves with yellow trim on a white background, while the shorts are white with a yellow and black side trim, with white socks. Sony renewed its contract with the Wellington Phoenix and remained the club's major sponsor.

Supplier: Reebok
Sponsor(s): Sony

Home	Away	Goalkeeper home	Goalkeeper away

=== End-of-season awards ===
See also List of Wellington Phoenix FC end-of-season awards

- Sony Player of the Year: Andrew Durante
- Members' Player of the Year: Paul Ifill
- Players' Player of the Year: Paul Ifill
- Media Player of the Year: Paul Ifill
- Golden Boot: Paul Ifill – 12 goals
- Under-23 Player of the Year: Troy Hearfield
