= Mark Paston =

New Zealand footballer (born 1976)

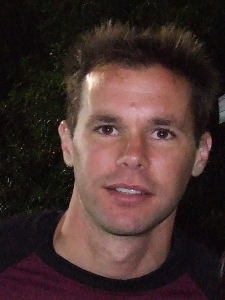

Personal information
- Full name: Mark Nelson Paston
- Date of birth: 13 December 1976 (age 49)
- Place of birth: Hastings, New Zealand
- Height: 1.95 m (6 ft 5 in)
- Position: Goalkeeper

Senior career*
Years	Team	Apps	(Gls)
1997–2003	Napier City Rovers	135	(0)
2003–2004	Bradford City	13	(0)
2004–2005	Walsall	9	(0)
2005–2006	St Johnstone	2	(0)
2006–2007	New Zealand Knights	10	(0)
2007–2013	Wellington Phoenix	72	(0)
Total		241	(0)

International career
1997–2013	New Zealand	36	(0)
- * Club domestic league appearances and goals

Mark Nelson Paston (born 13 December 1976) is a New Zealand former professional football goalkeeper. He played for the Wellington Phoenix in the A-League from 2007 to 2013 before he retired from professional football. Paston represented New Zealand at Under-23 level and made his full All Whites debut against Indonesia in 1997, but did not feature in another full international until 2003.

Paston was named in the New Zealand 2009 Confederations Cup squad to travel to South Africa, In 2009, he played in the World Cup Qualification playoff against Bahrain, saving a penalty and helping to secure New Zealand's qualification for the World Cup for only the second time in its history and he went all to play goalkeeper for the team in all of New Zealand's matches, including against Slovakia, Italy, and Paraguay.

== Club career ==
=== Early career ===
Paston's senior career began with Napier City Rovers before he moved to the United Kingdom in 2003 to join Bradford City. He followed this with a season at Walsall and then St Johnstone, before returning to New Zealand with the New Zealand Knights.

=== Wellington Phoenix ===
Paston signed for A-League club Wellington Phoenix in 2007 from the New Zealand Knights. Paston made his debut for the Phoenix against Adelaide United where they lost 4–1. Paston was often the Phoenix second choice goalkeeper but when Glen Moss left to Melbourne Victory, Paston became Phoenix's first-choice goalkeeper.

Paston signed a new one-year contract at the beginning of the 2009, keeping him at the Phoenix until the end of the 2009–10 season. Paston played a large part in the Phoenix's undefeated home streak A-League record by keeping clean sheets against Central Coast Mariners and Gold Coast United. On 10 December 2009 Paston suffered a tibia fracture that kept him sidelined for the rest of the season.

On 19 January 2010, Paston along with teammates Reece Crowther and Troy Hearfield signed contract extensions with the Phoenix. Paston is contracted until the conclusion of the 2011–12 season.

In a repeat of history, he suffered another tibial fracture below the right knee on 11 December 2010 after a collision in the loss to Gold Coast United, sidelining him for the second half of the 2010–2011 season.

On 31 March 2013, Paston announced his retirement from Wellington Phoenix and all professional football following the final 2012–13 regular season game in Round 27 against Melbourne Victory at Westpac Stadium.

== International career ==
Paston, having represented New Zealand at Under-23 level, made his full All Whites debut at the age of 20 in a 5–0 loss to Indonesia on 21 September 1997, but did not feature in another full international until 2003, Jason Batty, Michael Utting and later Ross Nicholson being preferred choices. Since returning to the international side in 2003, Paston has competed with former Wellington Phoenix teammate Glen Moss for the goalkeeper position. Since 2003 New Zealand has played 59 matches and between Paston (35) and Moss (21) they have played 56 matches between them.

He was named in the New Zealand 2009 Confederations Cup squad to travel to South Africa, where he was second choice as Moss played in all three games. However, Moss' suspension from international football for improper conduct meant that Paston played in the World Cup Qualification playoff against Bahrain. On 10 October 2009, Paston kept a clean sheet in the first leg in Riffa, and in the return leg on 14 November 2009 he was Man of the Match, saving a penalty from Sayed Mohamed Adnan in the 51st minute which was enough to secure New Zealand a 1–0 win in Wellington, enabling them to qualify for the World Cup for only the second time in their history.

Paston's fractured leg had threatened to harm his World Cup chances, but the goalkeeper made a good recovery and was named in New Zealand's final 23-man squad to compete at the World Cup on 10 May 2010. With Moss' suspension running into the first two games of the World Cup, Paston went on to play all of New Zealand's matches as Ricki Herbert's first-choice goalkeeper.

On 15 June 2010, Paston started against Slovakia and played an important role in helping New Zealand secure their first ever World Cup point with a 1–1 draw, however in the first half he went to clear the ball but completely missed it in his attempted kick, luckily Slovakia could not convert the chance. Five days later he was instrumental in ensuring the All Whites drew 1–1 with reigning champions Italy, making several acrobatic saves. His good form meant that he started the final group game against Paraguay on 24 June, but despite pulling off more excellent saves and keeping a clean sheet in a 0–0 draw, the All Whites were unable to reach the last 16.

Following the retirement from Wellington Phoenix at the end of the 2012–13 A-League season, Paston did not make his retirement from international football official until 8 August 2013.

== Career statistics ==
=== Club ===
Appearances and goals by club, season and competition
Club	Season	League			National cup (Note: Includes FA Cup, Scottish Cup.)		League cup (Note: Includes Football League Cup, Scottish League Cup.)		Continental		Total	
Club	Season	Division	Apps	Goals	Apps	Goals	Apps	Goals	Apps	Goals	Apps	Goals
Bradford City	2003–04	First Division	13	0	—		1		—		14	0
Walsall	2004–05	League One	10	0	1	0	1	0	—		12	0
St Johnstone	2005–06	Scottish First Division	2	0	—		1	0	—		3	0
New Zealand Knights	2006–07	A-League	10	0	—		—		—		10	0
Wellington Phoenix	2007–08	A-League	1	0	—		—		—		1	0
Wellington Phoenix	2008–09	A-League	9	0	—		—		—		9	0
Wellington Phoenix	2009–10	A-League	13	0	—		—		—		13	0
Wellington Phoenix	2010–11	A-League	15	0	—		—		—		15	0
Wellington Phoenix	2011–12	A-League	14	0	—		—		—		14	0
Wellington Phoenix	2012–13	A-League	8	0	—		—		—		8	0
Wellington Phoenix	Total		60	0	0	0	0	0	0	0	60	0
Career total			95	0	1	0	3	0	0	0	99	0

=== International ===
Appearances and goals by national team and year
National team	Year	Apps	Goals
New Zealand	1997	1	0
New Zealand	1998	0	0
New Zealand	1999	0	0
New Zealand	2000	0	0
New Zealand	2001	0	0
New Zealand	2002	0	0
New Zealand	2003	1	0
New Zealand	2004	5	0
New Zealand	2005	1	0
New Zealand	2006	0	0
New Zealand	2007	6	0
New Zealand	2008	1	0
New Zealand	2009	5	0
New Zealand	2010	8	0
New Zealand	2011	0	0
New Zealand	2012	7	0
Total		36	0
