= Andrew Durante =

New Zealand footballer (born 1982)

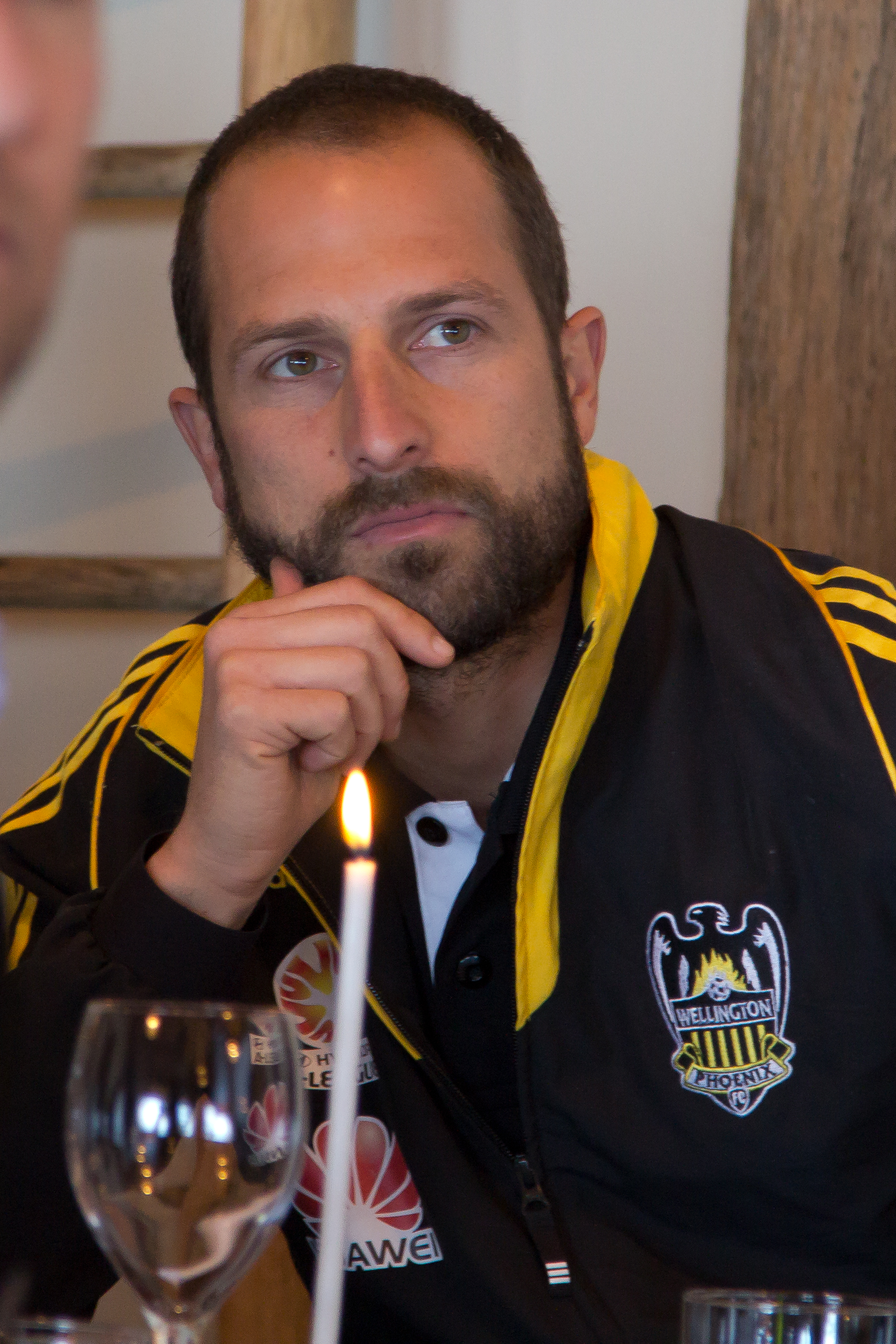
- Durante with the Wellington Phoenix

Personal information
- Full name: Andrew James Durante
- Date of birth: 3 May 1982 (age 44)
- Place of birth: Sydney, New South Wales, Australia
- Height: 1.84 m (6 ft 0 in)
- Position: Central defender

Youth career
- Sydney Olympic

Senior career*
| Years | Team | Apps | (Gls) |
| 2001–2003 | Sydney Olympic | 53 | (1) |
| 2003–2004 | Parramatta Power | 6 | (0) |
| 2004 | Balestier Khalsa | 8 | (0) |
| 2005–2008 | Newcastle Jets | 40 | (0) |
| 2008–2019 | Wellington Phoenix | 273 | (4) |
| 2011 | → Sydney FC (loan) | 0 | (0) |
| 2019–2021 | Western United | 45 | (2) |

International career^{‡}
| 2013–2017 | New Zealand | 24 | (0) |

Managerial career
- 2021–2023: Western United Youth (assistant)
- 2023–2025: Philippines women (assistant)
- 2023–2025: Western United (assistant)
- 2025–: Melbourne Victory (assistant)
- * Club domestic league appearances and goals as of 11 June 2021 ‡ National team caps and goals as of 15 June 2017

Andrew James Durante (born 3 May 1982) is a retired New Zealand international footballer who played as a defender. He is currently the Melbourne Victory 1st team Assistant Coach. In 2023, Durante was appointed as Assistant Coach of the Philippines women's national football team but in July 2025 announced he would no longer continue in his role after helping the team qualify for the Asian Cup 2026.

Born in Sydney, Australia, Durante played youth football with Sydney Olympic before making his senior debut at the club. He also played for Parramatta Power before moving to Singapore to play for Balestier Khalsa. After returning to Australia to play for Sydney United, Durante joined Newcastle Jets in the newly formed A-League. Durante joined Wellington Phoenix in 2008 and was given the captaincy and is currently the player with the most appearances for the club. He has also spent time on loan at Sydney FC for the Asian Champions League in 2011.

Durante became eligible to play for New Zealand in 2013, having lived in the country for five years.

== Football career ==
=== Club career ===
==== Newcastle Jets ====
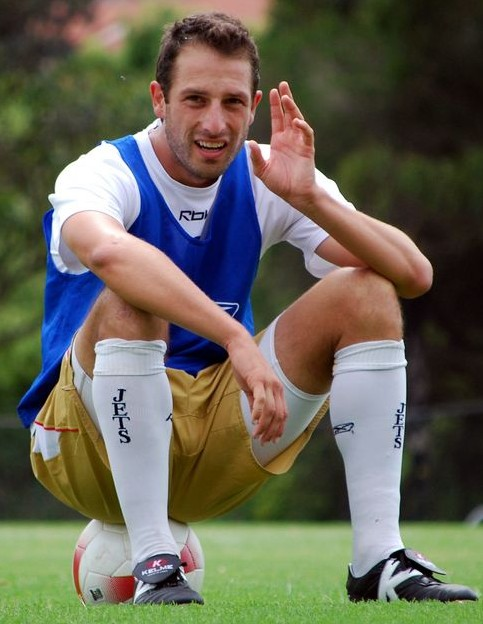
Durante with the Newcastle Jets.

Durante won the A-League Grand Final with the Jets in 2008 and was awarded the Joe Marston Medal in a man-of-the-match performance.

==== Wellington Phoenix ====
Durante joined the Phoenix in as captain at the start of the 2008–09 season and made an instant impact helping them make the final of the Pre-Season cup against Melbourne Victory, only narrowly losing 7–8 on penalty kicks.

In October 2009 Durante extended his contract with Wellington Phoenix until the end of 2011–12 season. Durante played every minute of the 2009–10 season for the Phoenix and along with Ben Sigmund for most of the season and utility Jon McKain, helped Wellington to their best defensive season in their history, conceding just 29 goals in 27 league matches of the regular season.

Durante led the Phoenix to a first-ever A-League finals appearance at the conclusion of the 2009–10 season after finishing in 4th place, earning them a home playoff match against 5th placed Perth Glory.

In March 2010, Durante scored his first ever A-league and Wellington Phoenix goal against Sydney FC in the preliminary final.

On 21 February 2011, Durante and the Phoenix announced that he would be loaned to Sydney FC for their Asian Champions League campaign. He made 5 appearances for Sydney FC during the campaign.

In January 2012 Durante extended his contract with Wellington by a further two years keeping him at the club until at least 2015.

On 5 November 2016 Durante reached 250 A-league appearances, the first outfield player to do so in the league.

On 2 February 2018 Durante broke the all-time A-League appearance record playing his 279 game in a loss to Sydney FC. Breaking goalkeeper Danny Vukovic record of 278 appearances.

On 11 June 2019 it was announced that Durante would be leaving the Wellington Phoenix after 11 seasons.

==== Western United ====
On 17 June 2019, it was announced Durante had signed for Western United for the 2019/20 Hyundai A league season.

On 19 May 2021, Durante announced that he would retire at the conclusion of the season.

=== International career ===
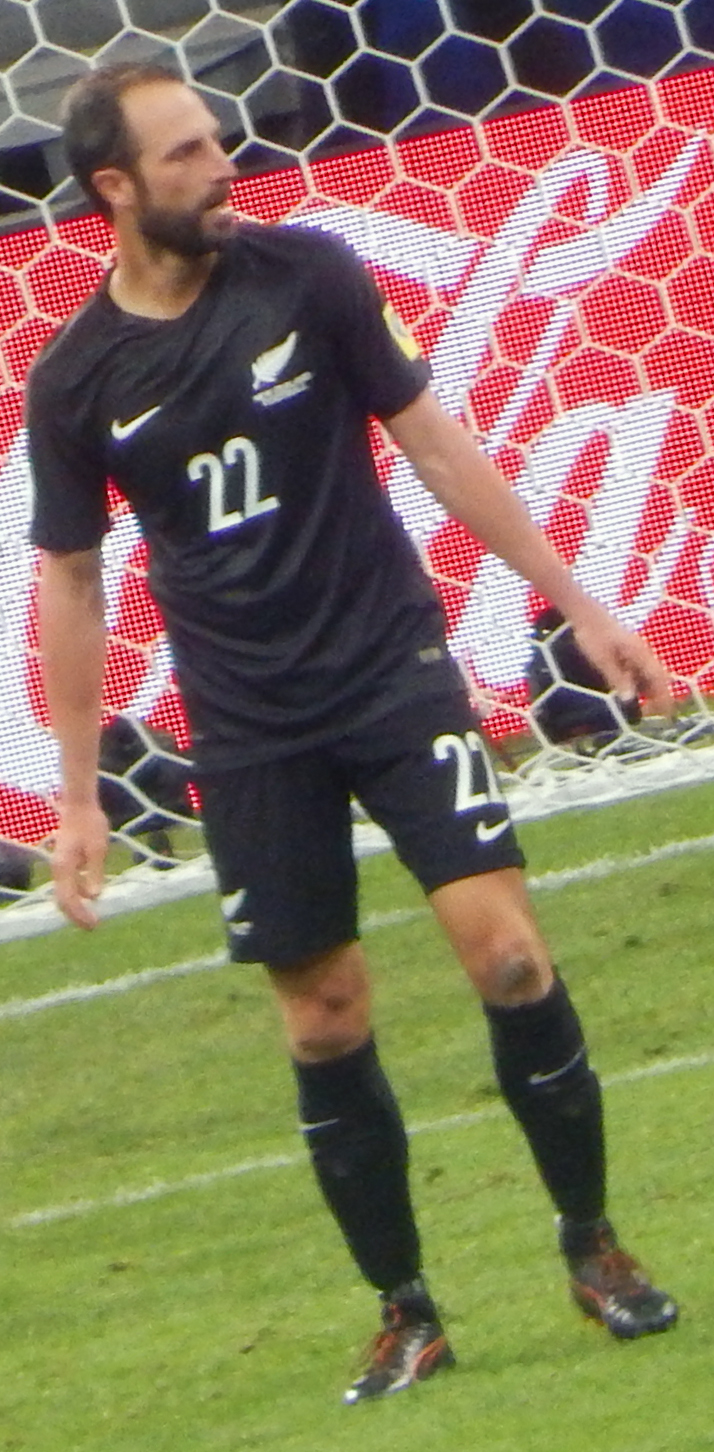
Durante in action during the 2017 Confederation Cup

Durante was selected in Pim Verbeek's Socceroo squad in February 2010 for Australia's 2011 AFC Asian Cup qualification match against Indonesia. Durante became a New Zealand citizen on 6 March 2013 and the next day was named in his first All Whites squad. He made his international debut for New Zealand in their World Cup Qualifier against the Solomon Islands in Honiara.

Durante made nine appearances for the national team before stepping aside from international football in 2015. In September 2016, he made himself available again for national team selection and was subsequently named in the team to tour the United States to play USA and Mexico in October 2016. In June 2017 he played in all 3 games at the 2017 Confederations Cup in Russia, playing against the hosts Russia, Mexico and Portugal. Durante went on to make 24 appearances for the national team before announcing his full retirement from international football in November 2017 after the loss to Peru in the 2nd leg of the 2018 FIFA World Cup qualification Intercontinental Playoff.

==== International career statistics ====
New Zealand national team
| Year | Apps | Goals |
|---|---|---|
| 2013 | 6 | 0 |
| 2014 | 3 | 0 |
| 2015 | 0 | 0 |
| 2016 | 4 | 0 |
| 2017 | 11 | 0 |
| Total | 24 | 0 |

== Coaching career ==
- Western United FC Youth Senior Assistant Coach

- On 24 August 2023, Durante was appointed as the Assistant Coach of the Philippines women's national football team.

- Western United FC 1st Team Assistant & Development Coach

- Melbourne Victory FC 1st Team Assistant Coach

== Personal life ==
In 1999, Durante was shot in the chest after being substituted during a trial match for Sydney Olympic's reserve team. The incident occurred in Mahoney Park of Sydney. After teammates noticed that he had been shot, the match was immediately abandoned and all the players ran into the change rooms. Durante's injury was not serious and he returned to the pitch just weeks later. The perpetrator was never found.

== Career statistics ==
=== Club ===
Appearances and goals by club, season and competition
| Club | Season | League | | | FFA Cup | | Other | | Total | |
| Club | Season | Division | Apps | Goals | Apps | Goals | Apps | Goals | Apps | Goals |
|---|---|---|---|---|---|---|---|---|---|---|
| Olympic Sharks | 2001–02 | National Soccer League | 24 | 0 | — | | — | | 24 | 0 |
| Olympic Sharks | 2002–03 | National Soccer League | 29 | 1 | — | | — | | 29 | 1 |
| Olympic Sharks | Total | | 53 | 1 | 0 | 0 | 0 | 0 | 53 | 1 |
| Parramatta Power | 2003–04 | National Soccer League | 5 | 0 | — | | — | | 5 | 0 |
| Balestier Khalsa | 2004 | S. League | 8 | 0 | — | | — | | 8 | 0 |
| Newcastle Jets | 2005–06 | A-League | 0 | 0 | — | | 1 (Note: Appearances in 2005 Australian Club World Championship Qualifying Tournament) | 0 | 1 | 0 |
| Newcastle Jets | 2006–07 | A-League | 19 | 0 | — | | 2 (Note: Appearances in A-League Finals) | 0 | 21 | 0 |
| Newcastle Jets | 2007–08 | A-League | 15 | 0 | — | | 4 | 0 | 19 | 0 |
| Newcastle Jets | Total | | 34 | 0 | 0 | 0 | 7 | 0 | 41 | 0 |
| Wellington Phoenix | 2008–09 | A-League | 16 | 0 | — | | — | | 16 | 0 |
| Wellington Phoenix | 2009–10 | A-League | 27 | 0 | — | | 3 | 1 | 30 | 1 |
| Wellington Phoenix | 2010–11 | A-League | 27 | 0 | — | | 1 | 0 | 28 | 0 |
| Wellington Phoenix | 2011–12 | A-League | 26 | 1 | — | | 2 | 0 | 28 | 1 |
| Wellington Phoenix | 2012–13 | A-League | 26 | 0 | — | | — | | 26 | 0 |
| Wellington Phoenix | 2013–14 | A-League | 26 | 1 | — | | — | | 26 | 1 |
| Wellington Phoenix | 2014–15 | A-League | 27 | 1 | — | | 1 | 0 | 28 | 1 |
| Wellington Phoenix | 2015–16 | A-League | 24 | 0 | — | | — | | 24 | 0 |
| Wellington Phoenix | 2016–17 | A-League | 22 | 0 | — | | — | | 22 | 0 |
| Wellington Phoenix | 2017–18 | A-League | 19 | 0 | — | | — | | 19 | 0 |
| Wellington Phoenix | 2018–19 | A-League | 25 | 0 | 1 | 0 | 1 | 0 | 27 | 0 |
| Wellington Phoenix | Total | | 265 | 3 | 1 | 0 | 8 | 1 | 274 | 4 |
| Sydney FC (loan) | 2010–11 | A-League | 0 | 0 | — | | 5 (Note: Appearances in AFC Champions League) | 0 | 5 | 0 |
| Western United | 2019–20 | A-League | 25 | 2 | — | | 1 | 0 | 26 | 1 |
| Western United | 2020–21 | A-League | 19 | 0 | — | | — | | 19 | 0 |
| Western United | Total | | 44 | 2 | 0 | 0 | 1 | 0 | 45 | 2 |
| Career total | | | | | | | | | | |

== Honours ==
=== Club ===
Sydney Olympic

- NSL Championship: 2001–02

Newcastle Jets

- A-League Championship: 2008

=== Individual ===
- Joe Marston Medal: 2008
- Wellington Phoenix Player of the Year: 2009–10, 2012–13
- PFA A-League Team of the Season: 2011–12, 2014–15
