= Manny Muscat =

Maltese footballer

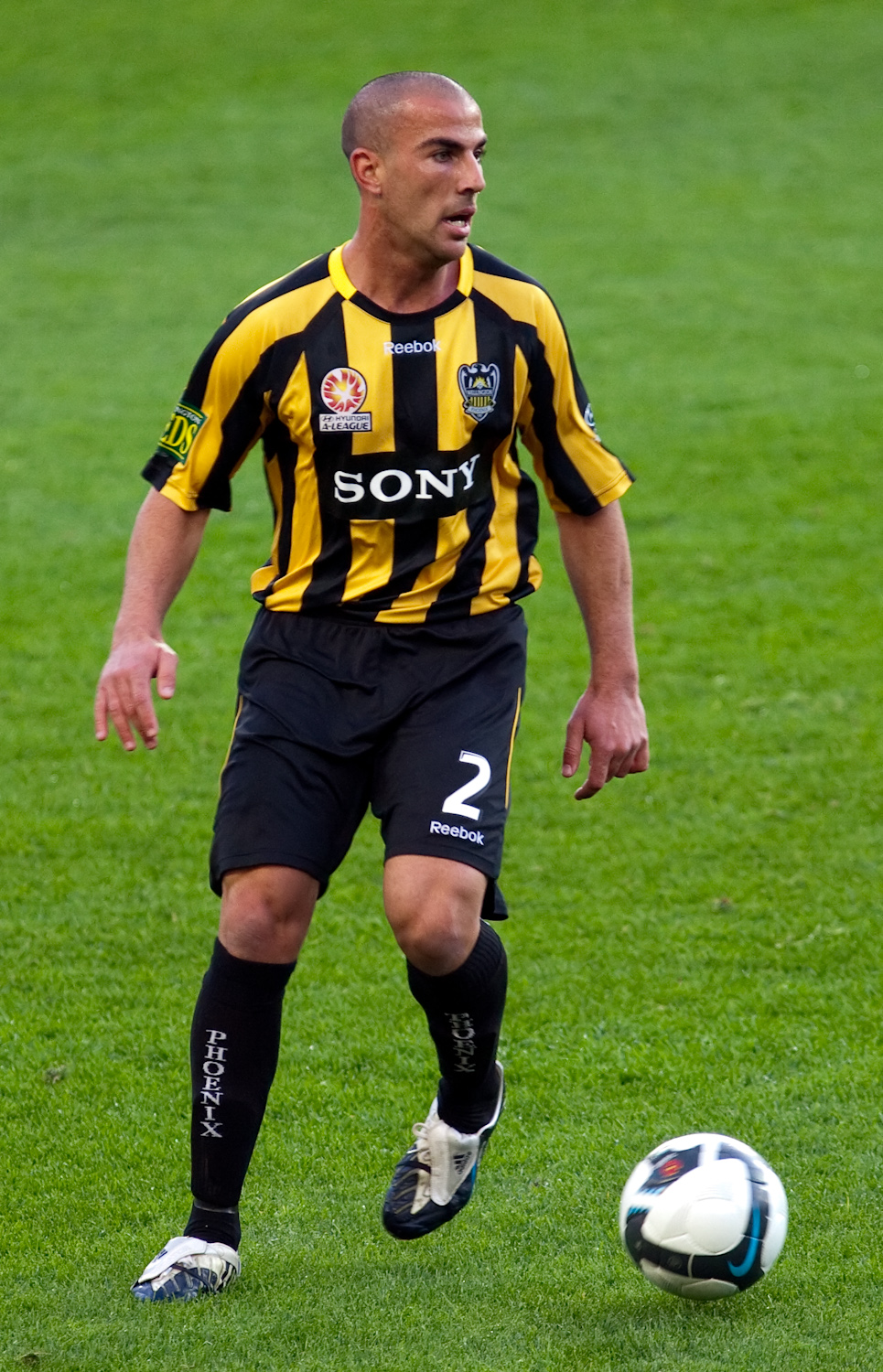
- Muscat playing for Wellington Phoenix in 2009

Personal information
- Full name: Emmanuel Muscat
- Date of birth: 7 December 1984 (age 41)
- Place of birth: Melbourne, Australia
- Height: 1.80 m (5 ft 11 in)
- Positions: Defensive midfielder; full back

Senior career*
Years	Team	Apps	(Gls)
2003–2007	Sunshine George Cross	48	(5)
2007–2008	Green Gully	44	(4)
2008–2016	Wellington Phoenix	192	(4)
2016–2018	Melbourne City	37	(1)
2018–2019	Green Gully	23	(0)

International career
2009–2011	Malta	9	(0)
- * Club domestic league appearances and goals as of 30 September 2019

Emmanuel "Manny" Muscat (born 7 December 1984) is a former professional footballer who last played as a defensive midfielder or right back for Green Gully in the NPL Victoria. Born in Australia, he represented the Malta national team.

== Club career ==
=== Early career ===
Raised in West Sunshine, Melbourne, Manny Muscat played for Sunshine George Cross where he was made captain at the age of 19, then made the switch to rivals Green Gully SC where he had the most successful years in his Victorian Premier career.

=== Wellington Phoenix ===
Wellington Phoenix signed him from Green Gully in August 2008, initially as a short-term injury replacement for the injured Vince Lia, but he was later offered a full contract and signed on as a contracted player.

Muscat made a total of twenty-six appearances for the Wellington Phoenix in the 2009–10 season, including all three of the final series matches. After getting the only red card of Wellington's season, fellow Phoenix player Troy Hearfield picked up Muscat's usual role of right back. This change pushed Muscat into a defensive midfield role for Wellington where Muscat continued to play through the rest of the season. On 20 October 2009, Muscat was rewarded for his fine form as he extended his contract with Wellington Phoenix for another three years. On 20 January 2012 Muscat scored his first goal for the club in his eighty fifth appearance versus the Newcastle Jets FC. The day after breaking his goal drought it was confirmed Muscat had extended his contract by a further two years and rejected offers from hometown clubs Melbourne Victory FC and Melbourne Heart. On 3 January 2013 Muscat received a 3-game suspension after twice elbowing a Brisbane Roar player in his side's 2–1 loss.

=== Melbourne City ===
On 3 March 2016, it was announced that Muscat had signed a 2-year deal with Melbourne City commencing at the beginning of the 2016–17 A-League season. He made his first appearance in a City shirt in a 5–0 friendly match win over Port Melbourne SC on 20 July 2016. On 3 May 2018, Muscat was released by Melbourne City.

=== Green Gully ===
Muscat returned to Green Gully after leaving the A-League.

== International career ==
On 11 May 2009, Muscat was called up to the Maltese national team and made his international début, for a friendly against the Czech Republic. He was used as a late substitute for a 2010 World Cup qualifier against Sweden.

In August 2010, Muscat was called up for the opening two UEFA Euro 2012 qualification matches against Israel and Latvia.

== A-League career statistics ==
Club	Season	A-League		Finals Series		Asia		Total	
Club	Season	App	Goals	App	Goals	App	Goals	App	Goals
Wellington Phoenix (A-League)	2008–09	14	0					14	0
Wellington Phoenix (A-League)	2009–10	23	0	3	0			26	0
Wellington Phoenix (A-League)	2010–11	27	0	1	0			28	0
Wellington Phoenix (A-League)	2011–12	25	1	2	1			27	2
Wellington Phoenix (A-League)	2012–13	24	0					24	0
Wellington Phoenix (A-League)	2013–14	21	0					21	0
Wellington Phoenix (A-League)	Club Total	134	1	6	1			140	2
Career totals		134	1	6	1			140	2
Last updated 16 March 2014

== Honours ==
Melbourne City

- FFA Cup: 2016

Individual

- A-League All Stars: 2014
