= Griffin McMaster =

Australian soccer player

Personal information
- Full name: Griffin McMaster
- Date of birth: 2 June 1983 (age 43)
- Place of birth: Gold Coast, Australia
- Height: 1.88 m (6 ft 2 in)
- Position: Goalkeeper

Team information
- Current team: Fitzroy City

Senior career*
Years	Team	Apps	(Gls)
2001	Palm Beach Sharks	12	(0)
2002	Surfers Paradise	25	(0)
2003–2004	Queensland Lions	15	(0)
2005–2006	Brisbane City	33	(0)
2007	Mt Gravatt	16	(0)
2007–2010	Brisbane Roar	16	(0)
2010	Oakleigh Cannons	16	(0)
2010	Wellington Phoenix	0	(0)
2011	Heidelberg United	19	(0)
2012	Moreland Zebras	19	(0)
2012	Bentleigh Greens	4	(0)
2012–2013	→ Wellington Phoenix (loan)	0	(0)
2013	Oakleigh Cannons	18	(0)
2014–2015	Heidelberg United	25	(0)
2016	FC Bulleen Lions	25	(0)
2017	Northcote City	21	(0)
2019	Altona City	7	(0)
2019	Northcote City	13	(0)
2020–2021	Altona Magic	6	(0)
2021–	Fitzroy City	7	(0)
- * Club domestic league appearances and goals as of 9 September 2021

Griffin McMaster (born 2 June 1983) is an Australian footballer who plays as a goalkeeper for FC Bulleen Lions in the National Premier Leagues Victoria.

== Club career ==
McMaster started playing for the Palm Beach Sharks and Surfers Paradise before moving to the Queensland Lions. In 2005, the A-League was formed and Queensland Roar (now Brisbane Roar) were given a license to be a part of the new 8-team competition. McMaster trained with the club under then coach Miron Bleiberg and played in the Brisbane state league for Brisbane City and Mt Gravatt. In July 2007, McMaster signed as a replacement for injured goalkeeper Matt Ham under new coach Frank Farina. He was understudy to Liam Reddy.

Following an injury (broken thumb) to keeper Liam Reddy, McMaster made his A-League debut on 5 January 2008 against Melbourne Victory and was named man of the match. McMaster played another man of the match performance in that season in a finals game against Sydney FC. He was replaced by Reddy for the following match, however he re-signed for two more seasons.

McMaster received limited game time under coach Farina before the sacking of Farina in October 2009. Ange Postecoglou was appointed the new coach and Reddy succumbed to another injury. McMaster played 12 games under Postecoglou before he was released by Brisbane Roar in March 2010 and joined Victorian Premier League club Oakleigh Cannons. In August 2010, McMaster was signed by Wellington Phoenix on an injury replacement deal for injured goalkeeper Reece Crowther.

McMaster signed for Heidelberg United to play in the 2011 season and won Victorian Premier League keeper of the year.

Towards the end of the 2011 Victorian Premier League season, McMaster was trialing with Melbourne Heart. He fractured his tibia in round 19 of the Victorian Premier League against Northcote City and was sidelined for 10 months.

In March 2012, McMaster signed with sport marketing company Upper90 Sports for 2 years. He also made a successful recovery from his broken leg for Moreland Zebras against South Melbourne in the Victorian Premier League. He left Moreland Zebras at the end of round 19 to join Bentleigh Greens for the remainder of the season.

On 30 November 2012, McMaster joined the Wellington Phoenix for a second injury replacement stint this time as cover for Glen Moss.

In 2014, McMaster made a return to Heidelberg United in the inaugural NPL season in Victoria. He has been making consistent appearances under coach George Katsakis. He has made a number of occasions on SEN radio on the football segment with Mark Fine.

In February 2016, it was confirmed that McMaster had left the Bergers to join the newly promoted FC Bulleen Lions.

== Adam Goodes Twitter Incident ==
On 29 July 2015, McMaster attracted negative attention and criticism following a series of racist tweets which were directed at indigenous Australian AFL player Adam Goodes. In McMaster's tweets, he criticised Goodes' view of Australia Day as "Invasion Day" (a term used by some Indigenous figures and their supporters to refer to 26 January), attacked Goodes for "not celebrating Australia Day", and called for the Aboriginal Australian to be "deported" from Australia. He soon deleted the tweets, in the face of significant controversy and criticism, followed by an apology.

McMaster was subsequently omitted from a FFA Cup game on the evening of 29 July. The following statement was made by Football Federation Australia (FFA), as reported by ABC news: "Football Federation Australia (FFA) applauds Heidelberg United Football Club for standing goalkeeper Griffin McMaster down from tonight's FFA Cup match following a series of offensive tweets this afternoon".

== A-League statistics ==
Club	Season	League^{1}		Cup		International^{2}		Total	
Club	Season	Apps	Goals	Apps	Goals	Apps	Goals	Apps	Goals
Brisbane Roar	2006–07	0	0	0	0	0	0	0	0
Brisbane Roar	2007–08	4	0	0	0	0	0	4	0
Brisbane Roar	2008–09	4	0	0	0	0	0	4	0
Brisbane Roar	2009–10	12	0	0	0	0	0	8	0
Wellington Phoenix	2010–11	0	0	0	0	0	0	0	0
Wellington Phoenix	2012–13	0	0	0	0	0	0	0	0
Total		20	0					20	0

^{1} - includes A-League final series statistics
^{2} - includes FIFA Club World Cup statistics; AFC Champions League statistics are included in season commencing after group stages (i.e. ACL and A-League seasons etc.)
