= Vince Lia =

Australian soccer player (born 1985)

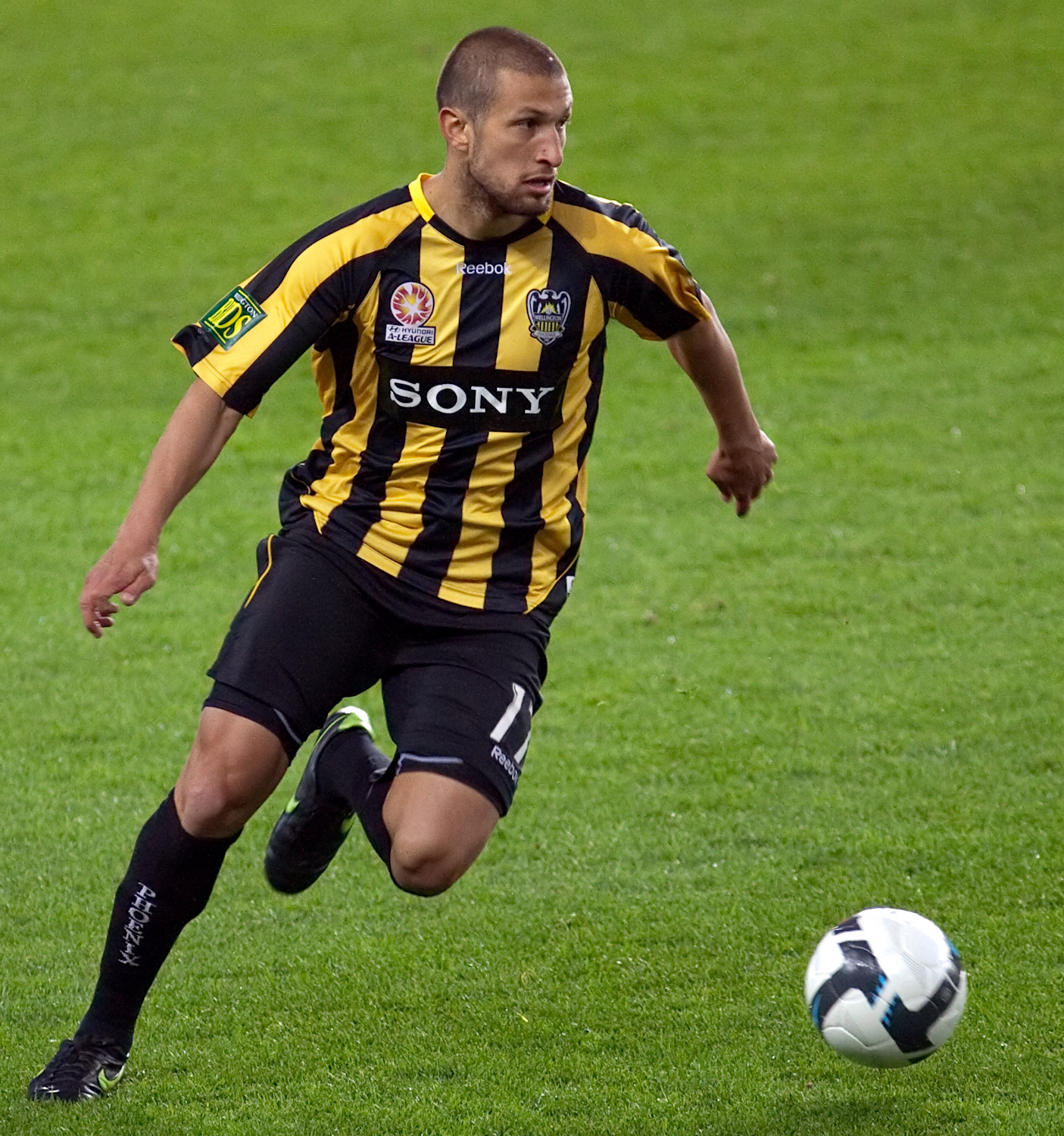
- Lia playing for Wellington Phoenix in 2009

Personal information
- Full name: Vince Lia
- Date of birth: 18 March 1985 (age 41)
- Place of birth: Shepparton, Victoria, Australia
- Height: 1.79 m (5 ft 10 1/2 in)
- Positions: Central midfielder; defensive midfielder

Team information
- Current team: Altona Magic

Youth career
- Tatura
- South Melbourne

Senior career*
Years	Team	Apps	(Gls)
2001–2004	South Melbourne	51	(0)
2005	Fawkner-Whittlesea Blues	3	(0)
2005–2007	Melbourne Victory	24	(0)
2007–2017	Wellington Phoenix	197	(4)
2017–2020	Adelaide United	34	(3)
2020	Perth Glory	4	(0)
2021–2022	Altona Magic	38	(3)
2023–	Essendon Royals	53	(2)

International career^{‡}
2002–2003	Australia U-17	12	(1)
2002–2005	Australia U-20	21	(5)
2006–2007	Australia U-23	4	(0)
Medal record
Men's football
Representing Australia
OFC U-20 Championship
Winner	2005
- * Club domestic league appearances and goals as of 11:05, 23 February 2026 ‡ National team caps and goals as of 6 January 2012

Vince Lia (born 18 March 1985) is an Australian professional football (soccer) player who plays for Essendon Royals in VPL 2.

Born in Shepparton, Lia played youth football in Victoria before making his senior debut with South Melbourne in the National Soccer League. He spent one season with Fawkner-Whittlesea Blues in 2005 before joining Melbourne Victory in 2005 to play in the newly formed A-League. Lia next spent a decade at Wellington Phoenix, making over 200 appearances for the club in all competitions. He returned to Australia in 2017, signing with Adelaide United. He had a brief spell at Perth Glory in 2020.

Lia represented Australia numerous times at youth level, including at the 2003 FIFA U-20 World Cup and 2005 FIFA U-20 World Cup.

== Club career ==
=== Melbourne Victory ===
Lia spent the early stages of his professional career in the NSL at South Melbourne. He then moved on to Melbourne Victory where he spent two years as a fringe player, albeit winning a championship.

=== Wellington Phoenix ===
Lia moved to the Wellington Phoenix in 2007. Lia scored his first ever A-League goal in a 1–1 draw against his former club, Melbourne Victory, in the 58th minute on 24 November 2007. Lia missed the entire 2008–09 A-League Season due to a knee injury suffered in pre-season, requiring a full reconstruction. On 20 October 2009, Lia extended his contract with the Wellington Phoenix until the end of 2012.

=== Adelaide United ===
After a successful trial, Lia was given a one-year deal with Adelaide United for the 2017–18 season. He made his A-League debut for the club on 13 October 2017 in a 2–1 win over Brisbane Roar. A week later, Lia scored both goals for Adelaide in a 2–2 draw against Melbourne Victory, his former club.

=== Perth Glory ===
Following a number of injuries to Perth Glory's defence, the club signed Lia for the remainder of the 2019–20 A-League season. Lia was released by Perth Glory at the end of the 2019–20 A-League.

=== Altona Magic ===
In February 2021, Lia joined Altona Magic.

== International career ==
Lia captained the Australian U-20's at the 2005 FIFA World Youth Championship.

== Career statistics ==
As of 15 May 2023

Appearances and goals by club, season and competition
Club	Season	League			Cup		Continental		Total	
Club	Season	Division	Apps	Goals	Apps	Goals	Apps	Goals	Apps	Goals
South Melbourne	2001–02	National Soccer League	13	0	0	0	0	0	13	0
South Melbourne	2002–03	National Soccer League	21	0	0	0	0	0	21	0
South Melbourne	2003–04	National Soccer League	17	0	0	0	0	0	17	0
South Melbourne	South Melbourne total		51	0	0	0	0	0	51	0
Fawkner-Whittlesea Blues	2005	Victorian Premier League	3	0	0	0	0	0	3	0
Melbourne Victory	2005–06	A-League	17	0	2	0	0	0	19	0
Melbourne Victory	2006–07	A-League	7	0	4	0	0	0	11	0
Melbourne Victory	Melbourne Victory total		24	0	6	0	0	0	30	0
Wellington Phoenix	2007–08	A-League	13	1	1	0	0	0	14	1
Wellington Phoenix	2008–09	A-League	0	0	1	0	0	0	1	0
Wellington Phoenix	2009–10	A-League	26	0	0	0	0	0	26	0
Wellington Phoenix	2010–11	A-League	24	1	0	0	0	0	24	1
Wellington Phoenix	2011–12	A-League	21	0	0	0	0	0	21	0
Wellington Phoenix	2012–13	A-League	23	0	0	0	0	0	23	0
Wellington Phoenix	2013–14	A-League	27	0	0	0	0	0	27	0
Wellington Phoenix	2014–15	A-League	21	0	0	0	0	0	21	0
Wellington Phoenix	2015–16	A-League	16	1	2	0	0	0	18	1
Wellington Phoenix	2016–17	A-League	26	1	1	0	0	0	27	1
Wellington Phoenix	Wellington total		197	4	5	0	0	0	202	4
Adelaide United	2017–18	A-League	9	2	2	0	0	0	11	2
Adelaide United	2018–19	A-League	23	1	4	0	0	0	27	1
Adelaide United	2019–20	A-League	2	0	3	0	0	0	5	0
Adelaide United	Adelaide total		34	3	9	0	0	0	43	3
Perth Glory	2019–20	A-League	4	0	0	0	0	0	4	0
Altona Magic	2021	National Premier Leagues Victoria	17	2	0	0	0	0	17	2
Altona Magic	2022	National Premier Leagues Victoria	21	1	1	0	0	0	22	1
Altona Magic	Total		18	3	1	0	0	0	39	3
Essendon Royals	2023	National Premier Leagues Victoria 3	9	0	0	0	0	0	9	0
Career total			353	10	17	0	0	0	370	10

== Honours ==
=== Club ===
Melbourne Victory

- A-League Championship: 2006–07
- A-League Premiership: 2006–07

Adelaide United

- FFA Cup: 2018, 2019

=== International ===
Australia

- OFC U-20 Championship: 2002, 2005
