= Oscar Cornejo =

Argentine footballer (born 1983)

Personal information
- Full name: Oscar Roberto Cornejo Hernandez
- Date of birth: 13 May 1983 (age 43)
- Place of birth: Santa Rosa, La Pampa, Argentina
- Height: 1.73 m (5 ft 8 in)
- Position: Attacking midfielder

Team information
- Current team: Club Atlético Santa Rosa

Senior career*
Years	Team	Apps	(Gls)
2001–2003	San Lorenzo	11	(1)
2004	Culiacán	14	(0)
2005	Universitario de Deportes	11	(0)
2005–2007	Gimnasia LP	51	(7)
2007	Deportivo Cali	9	(0)
2008–2009	Cobreloa	39	(4)
2010	Everton	16	(0)
2010–2011	Wellington Phoenix	5	(0)
2011	Club Atlético Santa Rosa	1	(0)
- * Club domestic league appearances and goals as of 21 February 2023 ‡ National team caps and goals as of 6

Oscar Roberto Cornejo Hernández (born 13 March 1983) is an Argentine former professional footballer who played as an attacking midfielder.

Born in Santa Rosa, La Pampa, he played professionally in Argentina, Mexico, Peru, Colombia, Chile and New Zealand, representing clubs including San Lorenzo, Gimnasia y Esgrima de La Plata, Cobreloa, Everton and Wellington Phoenix.

== Club career ==
Cornejo began his professional career with San Lorenzo, making his Argentine Primera División debut in 2001. He made 11 league appearances for the club across his first-team spell, scoring once. During his time at San Lorenzo, the club won the 2001 Clausura, the 2001 Copa Mercosur and the inaugural 2002 Copa Sudamericana.

Cornejo subsequently moved abroad, playing in Mexico for Dorados de Sinaloa and in Peru for Universitario. He later returned to Argentina to join Gimnasia y Esgrima de La Plata, where he spent two seasons. Cornejo made 35 Primera División appearances and scored four goals for Gimnasia during the 2005–06 and 2006–07 seasons.

In 2007, he moved to Colombia to join Deportivo Cali. His stay was brief, and the following year he moved to Chile after signing for Cobreloa. Cornejo became a regular in the Calama club's midfield during the 2008 season and scored four league goals.

Cornejo played a prominent role in Cobreloa's run to the semi-finals of the 2008 Clausura. In the first leg of the quarter-finals against Universidad de Chile, he scored the second goal in a 3–0 victory in Calama. Earlier in the tournament, he had also scored against Universidad de Chile in a 3–1 defeat at the Estadio Nacional.

In January 2009, Cornejo joined Everton at the request of manager Nelson Acosta, signing a contract through the end of the year. He made 16 appearances during the 2009 Apertura as Everton reached the semi-finals. Cornejo also represented the club in the 2009 Copa Libertadores, in which Everton competed in a group with Caracas F.C., Guadalajara and Lanús.

After leaving Everton, Cornejo returned to Argentina before moving to New Zealand in July 2010 to join Wellington Phoenix. He made his first appearance for the club shortly after arriving, playing in a friendly victory over Boca Juniors. He subsequently made five appearances in the A-League during the 2010–11 season.

Following his spell in New Zealand, Cornejo returned to Argentina, where he continued his career in the lower divisions, including spells with Alvarado and clubs in his native La Pampa, before ending his professional career.

== A-League career statistics ==
All-Time Club Performances
Club	Season	A-League		Finals Series		Asia		Total
Club	Season	App	Goals	App	Goals	App	Goals	App	Goals
Wellington Phoenix F.C.	2010–11	5	0					5	0
Club Total		5	0					5	0
Career totals		5	0					5	0
Last updated 7 June 2011

== Honours ==
San Lorenzo

- Torneo Clausura: 2001
- Copa Mercosur: 2001
- Copa Sudamericana: 2002
