= Jiang Chen =

Chinese footballer

Personal information
- Full name: Jiang Chen
- Date of birth: 24 June 1986 (age 40)
- Place of birth: Dalian, Liaoning, China
- Height: 1.80 m (5 ft 11 in)
- Position: Striker

Team information
- Current team: Changchun Yatai (assistant coach)

Youth career
- –2000: Dalian Wanda
- 2000–2004: Sichuan Guancheng

Senior career*
Years	Team	Apps	(Gls)
2004–2005	Sichuan Guancheng	6	(0)
2006–2012	Tianjin TEDA	22	(3)
2008	→ Shaanxi Chan-Ba (loan)	17	(2)
2009	→ Wellington Phoenix (loan)	2	(0)

International career^{‡}
2003–2004	China U-17	3	(0)
2007–2008	China U-23	12	(6)

Managerial career
- 2021–2022: Guangxi Pingguo Haliao (assistant)
- 2022: Guangxi Pingguo Haliao (caretaker)
- 2023: Guangxi Pingguo Haliao
- 2024: Jiangxi Dark Horse Junior
- 2025: Wenzhou FC (assistant)
- 2026–: Changchun Yatai (assistant)
Medal record
Representing China
Men's football
AFC U-17 Championship
Bronze medal – third place	2002 UAE	Team
- * Club domestic league appearances and goals as of 6 November 2010 ‡ National team caps and goals as of 6 August 2009

Jiang Chen (Chinese: 姜晨; pinyin: Jiāng Chén; born 24 June 1986 in Dalian, Liaoning) is a Chinese football coach and former football player.

== Club career ==
On 6 May 2004 he made his professional debut, coming on as a substitute in the 80th minute for Sichuan Guancheng against Qingdao Hailifeng in the Chinese FA Cup. On 27 January 2006 Sichuan Guancheng was disbanded and consequently, on 5 July, Jiang moved to Tianjin Teda.

On 5 August 2009 he joined A-League side Wellington Phoenix on a season-long loan deal after trialling with the team. On 17 October 2009 he made his debut for the Phoenix as a late substitute against North Queensland Fury. On 29 December 2009, he was released early from his loan contract with the Phoenix and returned to his parent club.

== International career ==
Jiang has had a strong youth career playing striker for both the China U-23 football team and the China U-17 football team. In May 2007, he made his debut for the China U-23 team and has since scored 6 goals in 12 appearances.
