= Reece Crowther =

Australian goalkeeper

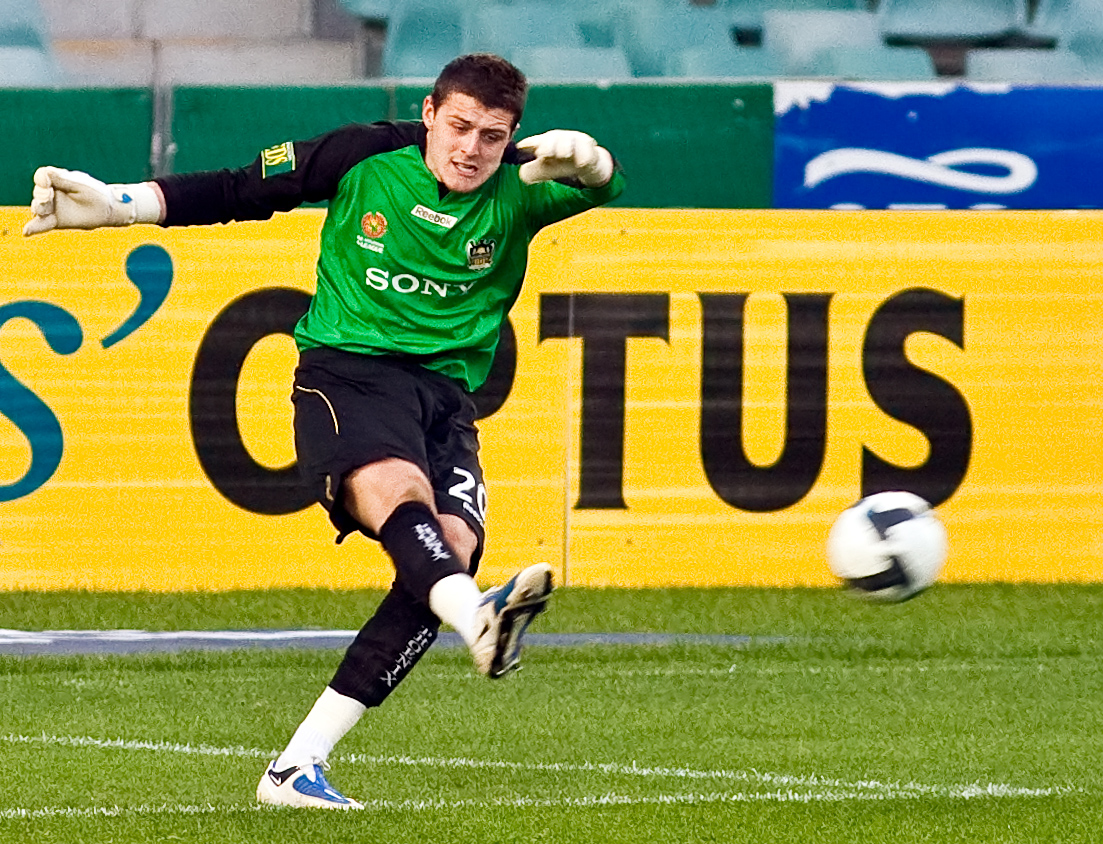

Personal information
- Full name: Reece Crowther
- Date of birth: 28 November 1988 (age 37)
- Place of birth: Rockhampton, Australia
- Height: 1.98 m (6 ft 6 in)
- Position: Goalkeeper

Youth career
- Mulgoa
- Marconi Stallions
- Parramatta Eagles
- 2005: Crystal Palace

Senior career*
Years	Team	Apps	(Gls)
2002–2006	West Sydney Berries	162	(0)
2006–2009	Queens Park Rangers	0	(0)
2008–2009	→ Wealdstone (loan)	6	(0)
2009–2011	Wellington Phoenix	6	(0)
2010	→ Ekenäs IF (loan)	25	(0)
- * Club domestic league appearances and goals as of 21 February 2011

Reece Crowther (born 28 November 1988) is an Australian goalkeeper.

== Club career ==
Crowther played all his junior football at Mulgoa who play in the Nepean Competition in Sydney before moving onto Representative football with the Marconi Stallions and Parramatta Eagles. He was part of the Parramatta Eagles side from which James Holland and Adam Biddle also graduated.

At 16 he was given the opportunity to move to England to pursue a professional career in football. He spent the next three years in England, learning his trade, firstly with Crystal Palace and then with Queens Park Rangers.

=== Wellington Phoenix ===
On 26 May 2009, he was signed on a one-year deal by Wellington Phoenix FC after trialling with the club and impressing the coaching staff.

On 30 August 2009, Crowther made his senior debut, starting for the Phoenix in a 2–0 loss against Sydney FC at the Sydney Football Stadium.

On 1 November 2009, Crowther made his second A-League appearance for Wellington Phoenix against Sydney FC after Mark Paston received a suspected hip injury which later proved to be a fractured leg. Crowther continued to start for the Phoenix until Liam Reddy arrived from Brisbane Roar as injury cover for Paston.

On 19 January 2010, Crowther re-signed with the Wellington Phoenix to keep him at the club until the end of the 2010/2011 season. Fellow Phoenix players Troy Hearfield and Mark Paston also re-signed with the team.

Crowther spent the off season as the first choice goalkeeper on loan to Finnish team EIF Ekenas where he made 25 appearances.

The start to the 2010–11 season was not pleasant for Crowther, being ruled out for the opening eight weeks with a cracked rib which he suffered at training.
