= Troy Hearfield =

Australian soccer player

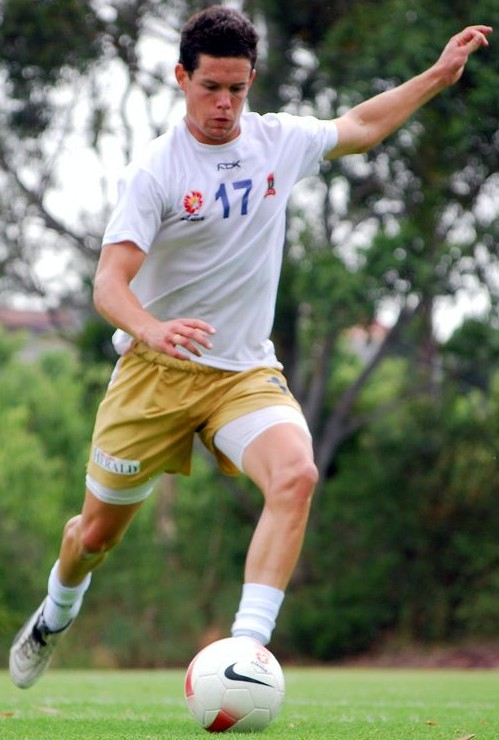
- Hearfield training with Newcastle Jets in 2008

Personal information
- Date of birth: 31 October 1987 (age 39)
- Place of birth: Tamworth, Australia
- Height: 1.80 m (5 ft 11 in)
- Position: Right back

Youth career
- NSWIS
- 2004–2006: AIS

Senior career*
Years	Team	Apps	(Gls)
2006–2008	Newcastle Jets	15	(0)
2008–2011	Wellington Phoenix	70	(3)
2011–2013	Central Coast Mariners	31	(2)
2011	→ Pelita Jaya (loan)	11	(1)
2014	Charlestown City Blues	19	(3)
2015	Weston Workers Bears	14	(4)
2016	Port Macquarie FC		
2017–2020	Tamworth FC	34	(27)

International career
2006–2007	Australia U20	14	(6)
2007–2008	Australia U23	5	(3)
- * Club domestic league appearances and goals

Troy Hearfield (born 31 October 1987) is an Australian former soccer who played as a right back.

== Club career ==
=== Newcastle Jets ===
Hearfield signed for Newcastle Jets in 2006. On 2 February 2007, Hearfield made his professional debut in a game against Sydney FC.

=== Wellington Phoenix ===
He made the transfer to Wellington Phoenix on 28 March 2008 after a rift between his former club Newcastle Jets about his release, and scored his first Phoenix goal against his former club on 23 November 2008. Over the last two season Hearfield has been a regular starter, playing out of position in right back for Wellington Phoenix. He worked hard and became a solid addition in the defence, he also was good in attack when on the overlap.

=== Central Coast Mariners ===
He parted ways with Phoenix at the end of the 2010–2011 season. and signed with the Central Coast Mariners for the 2011–2012 A-League season. Over the off-season Hearfield was on a loan deal for four months with Indonesian outfit Pelita Jaya. He scored his first goal in a 2–2 draw against Semen Padang FC. Hearfield made his debut for the Mariners, scoring in a pre-season friendly match against Scottish giants Celtic.

On 28 October 2012, Hearfield failed a doping test following the Mariners' round 4 match against Melbourne Heart. He played the club's following two matches while his sample was analysed, and after his sample was found to be positive he was provisionally suspended by ASADA. On 5 April 2013, it was reported that Hearfield had been sacked by the Central Coast Mariners. However, the next day the club released a statement confirming his departure but denying his sacking, instead claiming that Hearfield asked to be released from his contract.

== International career ==
He has represented Australia at both U-20 and U-23 Australian Olympic Football team. He has shown a good goal scoring record at both levels.

== A-League career statistics ==
A-League appearances and goals by club, season and competition
Club	Season	A-League		Finals		Cup		Asia		Total	
Club	Season	Apps	Goals	Apps	Goals	Apps	Goals	Apps	Goals	Apps	Goals
Newcastle Jets	2006–07	0	0	2	0	2	0	0	0	4	0
Newcastle Jets	2007–08	10	0	3	0	3	0	0	0	16	0
Newcastle Jets	Jets total	10	0	5	0	5	0	0	0	20	0
Wellington Phoenix	2008–09	14	2	0	0	4	1	0	0	18	3
Wellington Phoenix	2009–10	26	1	3	0	0	0	0	0	29	1
Wellington Phoenix	2010–11	26	0	1	0	0	0	0	0	27	0
Wellington Phoenix	Phoenix total	66	3	4	0	4	1	0	0	74	4
Central Coast Mariners	2011–12	25	2	2	0	0	0	4	0	31	2
Central Coast Mariners	2012–13	4	0	0	0	0	0	0	0	4	0
Central Coast Mariners	Mariners total	29	2	2	0	0	0	4	0	35	2
A-League total		105	5	11	0	9	1	4	0	129	6

== Honours ==
=== Club ===
Newcastle Jets:

- A-League Championship: 2007–08

Central Coast Mariners:

- A-League Premiership: 2011–12

== Personal life ==
On 9 November 2023, Hearfield was jailed for 12 month possessing a prohibited drug and three counts of driving a motor vehicle during a disqualification period.
