= Ben Sigmund =

New Zealand footballer (born 1981)

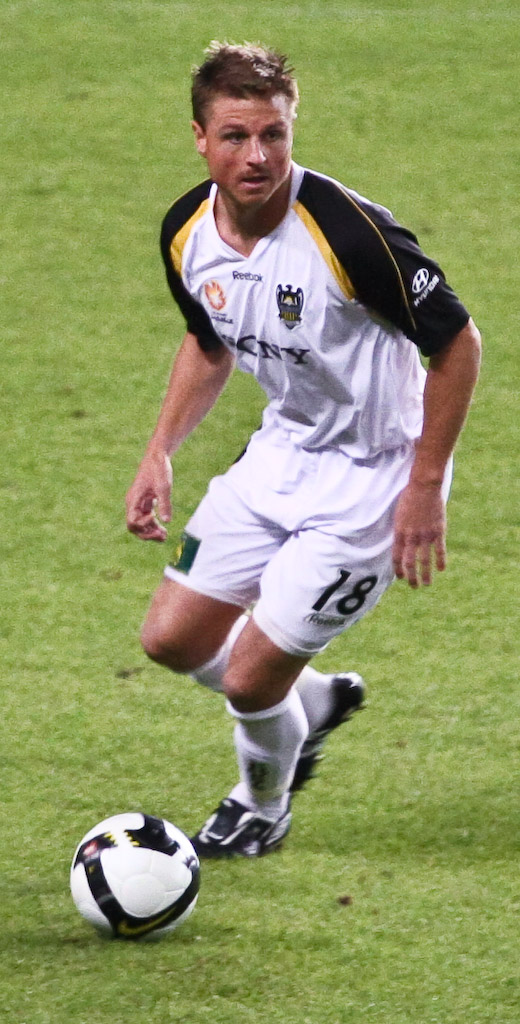
- Sigmund playing for Wellington Phoenix in 2008

Personal information
- Full name: Benjamin Robert Sigmund
- Date of birth: 3 February 1981 (age 45)
- Place of birth: Blenheim, Marlborough, New Zealand
- Height: 1.87 m (6 ft 2 in)
- Position: Centre back

Youth career
- –1998: Christchurch United

Senior career*
Years	Team	Apps	(Gls)
1998–2002	Christchurch United	76	(14)
2003–2004	Football Kingz	1	(0)
2004–2006	Canterbury United	83	(7)
2006	Fawkner Blues	11	(1)
2006–2008	Auckland City	43	(5)
2008–2016	Wellington Phoenix	181	(7)
2016	Wellington Phoenix Reserves	1	(0)
2016	Cashmere Technical		

International career
1999	New Zealand U17	3	(0)
	New Zealand U20	12	(0)
2000–2014	New Zealand	31	(2)
- * Club domestic league appearances and goals

Benjamin Robert Sigmund (born 3 February 1981) is a New Zealand former international footballer. He represented New Zealand at under-17, under-20 and senior level.

== Club career ==
Born in Blenheim, Sigmund spent his early career with Football Kingz, Canterbury United, Fawkner Blues and Auckland City. He signed for the Wellington Phoenix in 2008. On 9 July 2012 he signed a two-year contract extension keep him with the club until 2015.

On 18 December 2015, Sigmund announced that he would retire from professional football at the end of the season.

He subsequently joined amateur side Cashmere Technical in 2016.

== International career ==
Sigmund made his senior international debut as a substitute in August 2000 against Oman, but did not earn a second cap until 2007, where he earned a call up to play Wales in Wrexham after nearly seven years in the football wilderness. On 6 September 2008 Sigmund scored his first international goal in a 3–1 win over New Caledonia with a header from a corner.

Sigmund was named as part of the 2009 FIFA Confederations Cup New Zealand squad to travel to South Africa, and was more recently in the side the beat Bahrain in the 2010 FIFA World Cup qualification match on 14 November 2009.

On 10 May 2010, Sigmund was named in New Zealand's final 23-man squad to compete at the 2010 FIFA World Cup.

On 29 September 2014, Sigmund retired from international football citing his desire to spend more time with his family.

== Honours ==
Personal Honours:

- Wellington Phoenix Member's Player of the Year: 2008–2009
