= 2009–10 Perth Glory FC season =

Perth Glory FC
2009–10 season
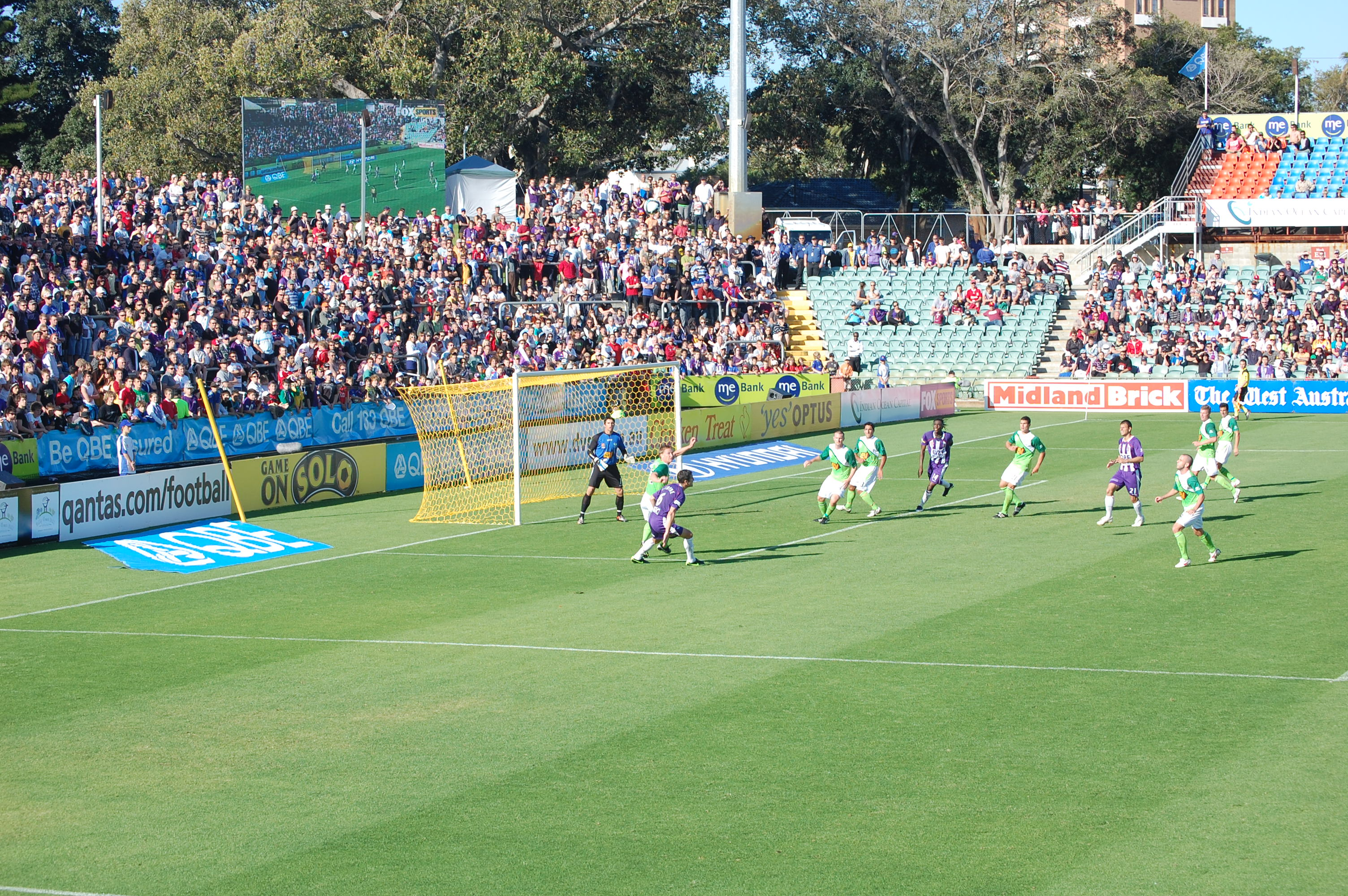
- Perth vs North Queensland
- Chairman: Tony Sage
- Manager: David Mitchell
- A-League: 5th
- Top goalscorer: 6 goals Mile Sterjovski
- Highest home attendance: 12,822 v North Queensland; 3 October 2009
- Lowest home attendance: 7,217 v Brisbane; 6 December 2009
- Average home league attendance: 9,205
- Biggest win: 4–0 v Newcastle United Jets; 26 December 2009
- Biggest defeat: 6–2 v Melbourne Victory; 16 January 2010
Home colours	Away colours

The 2009–10 Perth Glory FC season was the club's 13th season since its establishment in 1996. The club competed in the A-League for the 5th time. Perth Glory changed their logo and for the first time in their A-League history chose to include vertical purple and white stripes on their home kit this season.

Season expectations were very high with Perth Glory's owner Tony Sage allowing manager David Mitchell to sign High calibre players like former Bolton defender Andy Todd and former Ajax midfielder Viktor Sikora who was on loan to Perth from FC Dallas the previous season. The club also managed to secure Socceroos Jacob Burns, Mile Sterjovski and Chris Coyne. Both Sage and Mitchell's intentions were to restore Perth's footballing past and challenge for an A-League finals spot. At one stage of the campaign the Glory were pushing to claim top spot and the league but a run of poor form and injuries cost the team and only managed to hold on to their final league position of 5th which equalled their best A-League finish in 2005–2006.

Perth Glory were knocked out of the A-League finals when they took part in a 1–1 draw against the Wellington Phoenix in Wellington which they lost to penalties and thus ended Perth's best season of the A-League so far.

== Current squad for 2009–10 season ==
=== A-League squad ===
Note: Flags indicate national team as defined under FIFA eligibility rules; some limited exceptions apply. Players may hold more than one non-FIFA nationality.

No.	Pos.	Nation	Player
1	GK	AUS	Tando Velaphi
2	FW	AUS	Daniel McBreen
3	DF	AUS	Jamie Coyne
4	DF	ENG	Andy Todd
5	DF	AUS	Jamie Harnwell
6	DF	AUS	Chris Coyne
7	MF	AUS	Jacob Burns (Captain)
8	MF	NED	Victor Sikora
9	MF	AUS	Tommy Amphlett
10	MF	AUS	Wayne Srhoj
11	FW	SRB	Branko Jelic
12	DF	AUS	Scott Neville (Youth)

No.	Pos.	Nation	Player
13	MF	AUS	Scott Bulloch
14	MF	SCO	Steven McGarry
15	MF	AUS	Howard Fondyke (Youth)
16	MF	AUS	Adriano Pellegrino
17	MF	AUS	Todd Howarth
18	DF	AUS	Brent Griffiths (Youth)
19	DF	AUS	Naum Sekulovski
20	GK	AUS	Aleks Vrteski
21	FW	AUS	Mile Sterjovski (Marquee)
22	FW	AUS	Anthony Skorich (Youth)
23	MF	AUS	Andrija Jukic

== Squad changes for 2009-2010 season ==
=== In ===
Date	Pos.	Name	From	Fee	Ref.
16 February 2009	MF	(Netherlands) Viktor Sikora	Free Agent	Free	
4 May 2009	MF	(Australia) Jacob Burns	(Romania) FC Unirea Urziceni	Free	
18 May 2009	MF	(England) Andy Todd	(England) Derby County	Free	
18 May 2009	FW	(Serbia) Branko Jelić	(Germany) Energie Cottbus	Free	
12 June 2009	MF	(Australia) Mile Sterjovski	(England) Derby County	Free	
19 June 2009	MF	(Australia) Todd Howarth	(Australia) Perth SC	Free	
10 July 2009	DF	(Australia) Chris Coyne	(England) Colchester United	Free	
13 August 2009	FW	(Australia) Matthew Mayora	(Australia) Sydney Olympic	Short-Term Injury Loan (6 weeks)	
27 August 2009	FW	(Brazil) Amaral	Free agent	Guest Player Contract (9 weeks)	

=== Out ===
Date	Pos.	Name	To	Fee	Ref.
27 November 2008	FW	(England) James Robinson	(Australia) North Queensland Fury	Free	
7 January 2009	DF	(Australia) Nikolai Topor-Stanley	(Australia) Newcastle Jets	Free	
21 January 2009	DF	(Australia) Dino Djulbic	(Germany) Rot Weiss Ahlen	Undisclosed	
24 January 2009	GK	(Australia) Jason Petkovic	Retired	Free	
27 January 2009	FW	(Australia) Nikita Rukavytsya	(Netherlands) FC Twente	$1.2 million	
28 January 2009	FW	(Argentina) Adrian Trinidad	(Indonesia) Persiba Balikpapan	Free	
10 February 2009	MF	(Australia) Nick Rizzo	(Australia) Central Coast Mariners	Free	
11 May 2009	DF	(Australia) Hayden Foxe	Released	Free	
11 May 2009	GK	(Australia) Frank Juric	Retired	Free	
11 May 2009	MF	(Brazil) Amaral	Released	Free	
11 May 2009	DF	(Australia) David Tarka	Released	Free	
11 May 2009	MF	(Australia) Josip Magdic	Released	Free	
11 May 2009	MF	(Australia) Mark Lee	Released	Free	

=== Mid-Season Gains ===
Date	Pos.	Name	From	Fee	Ref.
21 November 2009	MF	(Australia) Tommy Amphlett	(Australia) ECU Joondalup	Free	
13 January 2010	FW	(Australia) Daniel McBreen	(Australia) North Queensland Fury	Free	
13 January 2010	MF	(Scotland) Steven McGarry	(Scotland) Motherwell	Free	

=== Mid-Season Losses ===
Date	Pos.	Name	To	Fee	Ref.
15 September 2009	FW	(Australia) Matthew Mayora	(Australia) Sydney Olympic	Loan return	
24 October 2009	FW	(Brazil) Amaral	Released	Guest Contract completed	
4 January 2010	FW	(Ivory Coast) Eugene Dadi	(New Zealand) Wellington Phoenix	Free	
13 January 2010	DF	(Australia) Jimmy Downey	(Australia) North Queensland Fury	Free	

== Friendlies ==
Kick off Match	Home team	Score	Away team	Venue

2009-06-16 19:00 UTC+8 1	Inglewood United (Australia)	0–1	Perth Glory	Clipsal Stadium, Perth, Western Australia
		Report	Jukic 39'	Referee: David Costello

2009-06-26 19:30 UTC+9:30 2	Adelaide United	1–0	Perth Glory	Hindmarsh Stadium, Adelaide, South Australia
	Dodd 25'	Report	Brent Griffiths (yellow card) 49'	Attendance: 1,961; Referee: Craig Zetter

2009-07-04 14:00 UTC+8 3	Cockburn City (Australia)	0–7	Perth Glory	Dalmatinac Park, Perth, Western Australia
		Report	Jukic 2 goals Bulloch 3 goals Dadi; Taggart

2009-07-10 19:30 UTC+8 4	Perth Glory	0–1	(England) Wolverhampton	ME Bank Stadium, Perth, Western Australia
		Report	Sylvan Ebanks-Blake 2'	Attendance: 11,083; Referee: Craig Zetter

2009-07-15 20:00 UTC+8 5	Perth Glory	0–5	(England) Fulham	ME Bank Stadium, Perth, Western Australia
	Scott Bulloch (yellow card) 15'	Report	Andrew Johnson 16'; Erik Nevland 60', 64', 68'; Andranik 84'	Attendance: 14,903; Referee: Ben Williams

2009-07-18 15:00 UTC+8 7	Perth Glory	1–0	North Queensland Fury	Hyundai Stadium, Mandurah, Western Australia
	Harnwell 17'	Report		Attendance: 2,780; Referee: Steven Gregory

2009-07-25 15:00 UTC+8 6	Perth Glory	0–1	Gold Coast United	Hands Oval, Bunbury, Western Australia
		Report	Porter 23'	Attendance: 2,985; Referee: David Costello

=== Home and away season ===
The 2009–10 A-League season will be played over 27 rounds, followed by a finals series.

== 2009–10 Hyundai A-League fixtures ==
7 August 2009	Adelaide United	1 : 0	Perth Glory	Hindmarsh Stadium, Adelaide
20:00 UTC+9:30	T. Dodd 30' (pen.)	Report; Summary		Attendance: 13,847; Referee: (Australia) Craig Zetter

16 August 2009	Wellington Phoenix	2 : 1	Perth Glory	Westpac Stadium, Wellington
17:00 UTC+12	Ifill 24'; Bertos 85'	Report; Summary	Sikora 3'	Attendance: 10,024; Referee: (New Zealand) Peter O'Leary

23 August 2009	Perth Glory	2 : 0	Newcastle Jets	ME Bank Stadium, Perth
15:00 UTC+8	Shroj 24'; Pellegrino 73'	Report; Summary		Attendance: 9,398; Referee: (Australia) Craig Zetter

28 August 2009	Perth Glory	2 : 1	Melbourne Victory	ME Bank Stadium, Perth
20:00 UTC+8	Jelić 5', 54'	Report; Summary	A. Thompson 9'	Attendance: 8,057; Referee: (Australia) Chris Beath

4 September 2009	Central Coast Mariners	2 : 1	Perth Glory	Canberra Stadium, Canberra
20:00 UTC+10	Wilkinson 42'; Simon 89'	Report; Summary	Sterjovski 82'	Attendance: 5,193; Referee: (Australia) Ben Williams

13 September 2009	Perth Glory	2 : 2	Gold Coast United	ME Bank Stadium, Perth
15:00 UTC+8	Jelić 14'; Sikora 16'	Report; Summary	Burns 53' (o.g.); Smeltz 90+1'	Attendance: 9,408; Referee: (Australia) Matthew Breeze

20 September 2009	Brisbane Roar	2 : 4	Perth Glory	Suncorp Stadium, Brisbane
17:00 UTC+10	Henrique 50'; C. Coyne 64' (o.g.)	Report; Summary	McCloughan 1' (o.g.); Shroj 41'; Jelić 61'; Reddy 76' (o.g.)	Attendance: 7,367; Referee: (Australia) Chris Beath

25 September 2009	Newcastle Jets	0 : 1	Perth Glory	EnergyAustralia Stadium, Newcastle
20:00 UTC+10		Report; Summary	Sterjovski 81' (pen.)	Attendance: 4,738; Referee: (Australia) Matthew Breeze

3 October 2009	Perth Glory	1 : 1	North Queensland Fury	ME Bank Stadium, Perth
15:30 UTC+8	Sterjovski 49' (pen.)	Report; Summary	Talay (yellow card) 24' (yellow-red card) 45'; Velaphi 70' (o.g.)	Attendance: 12,822; Referee: (Australia) Ben Williams

9 October 2009	Perth Glory	1 : 0	Adelaide United	ME Bank Stadium, Perth
19:00 UTC+8	Sikora 79'; Todd (yellow card) 43' (yellow-red card) 89'	Report; Summary		Attendance: 9,482; Referee: (Australia) Chris Beath

18 October 2009	Gold Coast United	2 : 1	Perth Glory	Skilled Park, Gold Coast
16:00 UTC+10	Neville 13' (o.g.); Smeltz 56'	Report; Summary	Howarth 55'	Attendance: 4,509; Referee: (Australia) Matthew Breeze

24 October 2009	North Queensland Fury	2 : 1	Perth Glory	Dairy Farmers Stadium, Townsville
19:30 UTC+10	Fowler 65'; Daal 71'	Report; Summary	Sikora 25'	Attendance: 6,332; Referee: (Australia) Peter Green

1 November 2009	Perth Glory	1 : 2	Melbourne Victory	ME Bank Stadium, Perth
16:00 UTC+8	Sterjovski 19'	Report; Summary	C. Coyne 7' (o.g.); Hernández 67'	Attendance: 10,035; Referee: (Australia) Strebre Delovski

8 November 2009	Wellington Phoenix	1 : 1	Perth Glory	Westpac Stadium, Wellington
17:00 UTC+13	Ifill 82'	Report; Summary	Shroj 68'	Attendance: 6,930; Referee: (Australia) Matthew Gillett

22 November 2009	Perth Glory	2 : 0	Sydney FC	ME Bank Stadium, Perth
16:00 UTC+8	Bulloch 57'; Jelić 88'	Report; Summary		Attendance: 8,932; Referee: (Australia) Strebre Delovski

27 November 2009	Central Coast Mariners	0 : 0	Perth Glory	Bluetongue Stadium, Gosford
20:00 UTC+11		Report; Summary		Attendance: 7,857; Referee: (Australia) Gerard Parsons

6 December 2009	Perth Glory	1 : 1	Brisbane Roar	ME Bank Stadium, Perth
16:00 UTC+8	Harnwell 78'	Report; Summary	DeVere 52'	Attendance: 7,217; Referee: (Australia) Strebre Delovski

11 December 2009	North Queensland Fury	1 : 0	Perth Glory	Dairy Farmers Stadium, Townsville
19:30 UTC+10	Williams 32'	Report; Summary		Attendance: 5,287; Referee: (Australia) Peter Green

19 January 2010	Adelaide United	2 : 3	Perth Glory	Hindmarsh Stadium, Adelaide
19:30 UTC+10:30	Pantelis 13' (yellow card) 67' (yellow-red card) 90+6'; T. Dodd 52'; Fyfe (red card) 61'	Report; Summary	Burns 63', 69'; McBreen 78'	Attendance: 8,904; Referee: (Australia) Ben Williams

20 December 2009	Gold Coast United	2 : 0	Perth Glory	Skilled Park, Gold Coast
18:00 UTC+10	Smeltz 3'; Miller 76'	Report; Summary		Attendance: 4,310; Referee: (Australia) Chris Beath

26 December 2009	Perth Glory	4 : 0	Newcastle Jets	ME Bank Stadium, Perth
17:00 UTC+8	Sekulovski 19'; Harnwell 24', 69'; Sterjovski 36' (pen.)	Report; Summary		Attendance: 9,418; Referee: (Australia) Ben Williams

10 January 2010	Perth Glory	0 : 0	Sydney FC	ME Bank Stadium, Perth
16:00 UTC+8		Report; Summary		Attendance: 9,319; Referee: (Australia) Strebre Delovski

16 January 2010	Melbourne Victory	6 : 2	Perth Glory	Etihad Stadium, Melbourne
19:00 UTC+11	A. Thompson 4'; Kruse 12', 26', 39'; K. Muscat 81' (pen.); Hernández 83'	Report; Summary	Vargas 20' (o.g.); Sterjovski 52'	Attendance: 20,448; Referee: (Australia) Strebre Delovski

22 January 2010	Perth Glory	2 : 0	Wellington Phoenix	ME Bank Stadium, Perth
19:00 UTC+8	McBreen 23'; Howarth 42'	Report; Summary		Attendance: 9,368; Referee: (Australia) Ryan Shepheard

31 January 2010	Perth Glory	3 : 1	Central Coast Mariners	ME Bank Stadium, Perth
16:00 UTC+8	McBreen 1', 13'; Jukic 45+1'	Report; Summary	Kwasnik 49'	Attendance: 8,160; Referee: (Australia) Gerard Parsons

7 February 2010	Sydney FC	3 : 2	Perth Glory	Parramatta Stadium, Sydney
17:00 UTC+11	Corica 24' (pen.); Aloisi 48', 87'	Report; Summary	Shroj 45+2'; McBreen 79'	Attendance: 8,359; Referee: (Australia) Chris Beath

13 February 2010	Perth Glory	2 : 0	Brisbane Roar	ME Bank Stadium, Perth
16:00 UTC+8	Neville 9'; Bulloch 73'	Report; Summary		Attendance: 8,054; Referee: (Australia) Peter Green

=== 2009-10 Finals series ===
21 February 2010 Semi-Final 4 v 5	Wellington Phoenix	1 : 1 (a.e.t.)	Perth Glory	Westpac Stadium, Wellington
17:00 UTC+13	Greenacre 37'; McKain (yellow card) 32' (yellow-red card) 105'	(4-2 pen.); Report; Summary	Neville 67'	Attendance: 24,278; Referee: (Australia) Strebre Delovski
	Penalties
	Ifill (penalty scored); Durante (penalty scored); T. Brown (penalty scored); Caceres (penalty scored)		(penalty scored) McGarry; (penalty missed) Sekulovski; (penalty missed) Bulloch; (penalty scored) McBreen

Pos	Team	Pld	W	D	L	GF	GA	GD	Pts	Qualification
1	Sydney FC (C)	27	15	3	9	35	23	+12	48	Qualification for 2011 AFC Champions League group stage and Finals series
2	Melbourne Victory	27	14	5	8	47	32	+15	47	Qualification for 2011 AFC Champions League group stage and Finals series
3	Gold Coast United	27	13	5	9	39	35	+4	44	Qualification for Finals series
4	Wellington Phoenix	27	10	10	7	37	29	+8	40	Qualification for Finals series
5	Perth Glory	27	11	6	10	40	34	+6	39	Qualification for Finals series
6	Newcastle Jets	27	10	4	13	33	45	−12	34	Qualification for Finals series
7	North Queensland Fury	27	8	8	11	29	46	−17	32	
8	Central Coast Mariners	27	7	9	11	32	29	+3	30	
9	Brisbane Roar	27	8	6	13	32	42	−10	30	
10	Adelaide United	27	7	8	12	24	33	−9	29	

Source: ultimatealeague.com
Rules for classification: 1) points; 2) goal difference; 3) number of goals scored.
(C) Champions

== Season statistics ==
(Current as of Round 27)

=== Leading scorers ===
Perth Glory A-League Top Scorers

Total	Player	Team	Goals per Round																										
Total	Player	Team	1	2	3	4	5	6	7	8	9	10	11	12	13	14	15	16	17	18	19	20	21	22	23	24	25	26	27
6	(Australia) Mile Sterjovski	Perth Glory					1			1	1				1								1		1				
5	(Serbia) Branko Jelic	Perth Glory				2		1	1								1												
5	(Australia) Daniel McBreen	Perth Glory																			1					1	2	1	
4	(Netherlands) Victor Sikora	Perth Glory		1				1				1		1															
4	(Australia) Wayne Srhoj	Perth Glory			1				1							1												1	
3	(Australia) Jamie Harnwell	Perth Glory																	1				2						
2	(Australia) Adriano Pellegrino	Perth Glory			1				1																				
2	(Australia) Todd Howarth	Perth Glory											1													1			
2	(Australia) Jacob Burns	Perth Glory																			2								
2	(Australia) Scott Bulloch	Perth Glory															1												1
1	(Australia) Naum Sekulovski	Perth Glory																					1						
1	(Australia) Andrija Jukic	Perth Glory																									1		
1	(Australia) Scott Neville	Perth Glory																											1

=== Discipline ===
Name	Cautions (yellow card)	2nd Caution – Send-Off (yellow card) (yellow card) (red card)	Send-Offs (red card)
(Australia) Jacob Burns	7	0	0
(Australia) Wayne Srhoj	6	0	0
(Australia) Adriano Pellegrino	5	0	0
(Australia) Chris Coyne	5	0	0
(England) Andy Todd	4	1	0
(Netherlands) Victor Sikora	4	0	0
(Australia) Naum Sekulovski	4	0	0
(Australia) Mile Sterjovski	3	0	0
(Serbia) Branko Jelic	2	0	0
(Australia) Jamie Harnwell	2	0	0
(Australia) Scott Neville	2	0	0
(Australia) Jamie Coyne	1	0	0
(Australia) Scott Bulloch	1	0	0
(Australia) Tando Velaphi	1	0	0
(Ivory Coast) Eugene Dadi	1	0	0
(Australia) Aleks Vrteski	1	0	0
(Australia) Daniel McBreen	1	0	0
(Scotland) Steven McGarry	1	0	0
(Australia) Andrija Jukic	1	0	0

=== Home attendance ===
Round	Opponent	Attendance
3	(Australia) Newcastle Jets	9,398
4	(Australia) Melbourne Victory	8,057
6	(Australia) Gold Coast United	9,408
9	(Australia) North Queensland Fury	12,822
10	(Australia) Adelaide United	9,482
13	(Australia) Melbourne Victory	10,035
15	(Australia) Sydney FC	8,932
17	(Australia) Brisbane Roar	7,217
21	(Australia) Newcastle Jets	9,418
22	(Australia) Sydney FC	9,319
24	(Australia) Wellington Phoenix	9,368
25	(Australia) Central Coast Mariners	8,160
27	(Australia) Brisbane Roar	8,054
	Total attendance	119,670
	Average attendance	9,205
