= 2008–09 Perth Glory FC season =

Perth Glory FC
2008–09 season
- Manager: David Mitchell
- A-League: 7th
- Top goalscorer: 10 goals Eugene Dadi; Nikita Rukavytsya
- Highest home attendance: 12,581 v Adelaide; 26 December 2008
- Lowest home attendance: 4,433 v Wellington; 21 September 2008
- Average home league attendance: 7,941
- Biggest win: 4–1 v Sydney FC; 21 December 2008
- Biggest defeat: 4–0 v Melbourne Victory; 4 October 2008
Home colours	Away colours

The 2008–09 season was Perth Glory FC's 4th season since the inception of the A-League and 12th since the club's founding, in 1996.

== 2008–09 Squad ==
Note: Flags indicate national team as defined under FIFA eligibility rules; some limited exceptions apply. Players may hold more than one non-FIFA nationality.

No.	Pos.	Nation	Player
1	GK	AUS	Jason Petkovic
2	DF	AUS	Nikolai Topor-Stanley
3	DF	AUS	David Tarka
4	DF	AUS	Jamie Coyne
5	DF	AUS	Jamie Harnwell
6	DF	AUS	Dino Djulbic
7	MF	AUS	Nick Rizzo
8	FW	ENG	James Robinson
9	MF	ARG	Adrian Trinidad
10	MF	BRA	Amaral
11	MF	AUS	Scott Bulloch
12	MF	AUS	Josip Magdic
13	FW	AUS	Nikita Rukavytsya
14	FW	CIV	Eugene Dadi

No.	Pos.	Nation	Player
15	DF	AUS	Hayden Doyle
16	MF	AUS	Adriano Pellegrino
17	MF	AUS	Jimmy Downey
18	DF	AUS	Hayden Foxe
19	MF	AUS	Naum Sekulovski
20	GK	AUS	Frank Juric
21	MF	AUS	Mark Lee
22	MF	AUS	Wayne Srhoj
25	MF	SCO	Marc Anthony
26	DF	AUS	Jeff Bright
27	DF	AUS	Stuart McLaren
29	FW	NED	Victor Sikora
30	GK	AUS	Tando Velaphi
31	DF	AUS	Scott Neville

== Squad changes for 2008-2009 season ==
=== In ===
Date	Pos.	Name	From	Fee	Ref.
23 March 2008	FW	(Ivory Coast) Eugene Dadi	(Israel) Hapoel Acre F.C.	Free	
7 April 2008	MF	(Australia) Josip Magdic	(Australia) Floreat Athena	Free	
2 May 2008	MF	(Australia) Adriano Pellegrino	(Australia) North Eastern MetroStars	Free	
2 May 2008	FW	(Argentina) Adrian Trinidad	(Malaysia) KL PLUS FC	Free	
5 May 2008	GK	(Australia) Frank Juric	(Germany) Hannover 96	Free	
10 June 2008	MF	(Australia) Mark Lee	(Australia) ECU Joondalup	Free	
20 June 2008	DF	(Australia) Hayden Doyle	(Greece) Niki Volos	Free	
6 July 2008	MF	(Brazil) Amaral	(Brazil) Grêmio Recreativo Barueri	Free	
11 August 2008	DF	(Australia) Scott Bulloch	(Australia) Sorrento FC	Free	
5 September 2008	MF	(Scotland) Wayne Shroj	(Romania) FC Timişoara	Free	
13 September 2008	DF	(Australia) Stuart McLaren	(Australia) Brisbane Strikers	Short-Term Injury Loan (4 weeks)	
13 September 2008	DF	(Australia) Jeff Bright	(Australia) Mandurah City	Short-Term Injury Loan (8 weeks)	

=== Out ===
Date	Pos.	Name	To	Fee	Ref.
27 January 2008	DF	(Australia) Simon Colosimo	(Australia) Sydney FC	Free	
6 February 2008	MF	(Australia) Billy Celeski	(Australia) Melbourne Victory	Free	
February 2008	FW	(Liberia) Jerry Karpeh	(Australia) Whittlesea Zebras	Free	
February 2008	FW	(Australia) David Micevski	(Australia) Western Knights	Free	
17 March 2008	FW	(Australia) Jordan Simpson	(Australia) Blacktown City Demons	Free	
17 March 2008	FW	(Australia) Tyler Simpson	(Australia) Blacktown City Demons	Free	
3 April 2008	MF	(New Zealand) Leo Bertos	(New Zealand) Wellington Phoenix	Free	
21 April 2008	MF	(Australia) Stan Lazaridis	Retired	Free	
6 May 2008	MF	(Australia) Mitchell Prentice	(Australia) Sydney FC	Free	

=== Mid-Season Gains ===
Date	Pos.	Name	From	Fee	Ref.
17 November 2008	MF	(Scotland) Marc Anthony	(Australia) Stirling Macedonia	Free	
18 December 2008	MF	(Netherlands) Victor Sikora	(United States) FC Dallas 96	Short-Term Injury Contract (5 weeks)	

=== Mid-Season Losses ===
Date	Pos.	Name	To	Fee	Ref.
October 2008	DF	(Australia) Stuart McLaren	(Australia) Brisbane Strikers	Short-Term Loan expired	
November 2008	DF	(Australia) Jeff Bright	(Australia) Mandurah City	Short-Term Loan expired	

== Friendlies ==
=== China Tour ===
Perth Glory began their pre-season early, with a three match trip to China, in early March. The team played three matches against three Chinese Super League sides, Changchun Yatai, Changsha Ginde and Guangzhou Pharmaceutical. Glory lost all three matches, but the tour was successful for trialling many new players in the lineup.

=== Local Friendlies ===
In June, the Perth Glory squad took on Football West State League side Rockingham City in Port Kennedy, defeating the side 8–0 in front of a crowd of around 1,500. Glory also played the WA State Team, losing 2–3, with David Tarka making a successful return to competitive football in the match, after being out of the game through a hamstring injury for the past ten months.

=== Indonesia Tour ===
Finally in July, Perth Glory embarked on a short pre-season tour of Indonesia, playing and defeating Indonesian Super League sides, Persik Kediri and Deltras Sidoarjo, 2–1 and 1–0 respectively. Mitchell was able to give new recruits, like Eugene Dadi, Adrian Trinidad and Amaral a good run as well as a competitive hit out for younger State League recruits to impress, like Josip Magdic who scored the winner against Deltras Sidoarjo.

1	Persik Kediri (Indonesia)	1–2	(Australia) Perth Glory	Brawijaya Stadium, Kediri

2	Deltras Sidoarjo (Indonesia)	0–1	(Australia) Perth Glory	Gelora Delta Stadium, Sidoarjo

== Pre-Season Cup ==
Round	Date	Home team	Score	Away team	Crowd	Stadium
1	19 July 2008	Perth Glory	1 – 1	Newcastle Jets	3,825	Hyundai Stadium, Mandurah, Western Australia
2	26 July 2008	Perth Glory	0 – 1	Melbourne Victory	3,020	Members Equity Stadium, Perth, Western Australia
3	2 August 2008	Adelaide United	0 – 0	Perth Glory	3,000	Vansittart Park, Mount Gambier, South Australia

Unlike last season, Perth were not as successful in this season's Pre-Season Cup, though also unlike last season, Glory had some pre-season cup games scheduled at home this time. Adrian Trinidad impressed, including creating and scoring a penalty in the first match against the Newcastle Jets, in Mandurah.

== 2008–09 Hyundai A-League fixtures ==
17 August 2008	Adelaide United	1 : 0	Perth Glory	Hindmarsh Stadium, Adelaide
16:30 UTC+9:30	T. Dodd 41'	Report; Summary		Attendance: 10,510; Referee: (Australia) Peter Green

22 August 2008	Perth Glory	3 : 3	Newcastle Jets	Members Equity Stadium, Perth
19:00 UTC+8	Trinidad 35' (pen.); Dadi 58'; Rukavytsya 81'	Report Summary	J. Griffiths 20' (pen.); Coyne 49' (o.g.); North 90+5'	Attendance: 8,876; Referee: (Australia) Craig Zetter

31 August 2008	Sydney FC	5 : 2	Perth Glory	Sydney Football Stadium, Sydney
15:00 UTC+10	Brosque 3'; Corica 21' (pen.); Bridge 39'; Cole 43'; Topor-Stanley 88' (o.g.)	Report; Summary	Dadi 12', 67' (pen.); Djulbic (yellow card) 20' (red card) 20'	Attendance: 11,732; Referee: (Australia) Peter Green

14 September 2008	Perth Glory	0 : 3	Queensland Roar	Members Equity Stadium, Perth
15:00 UTC+8		Report; Summary	Moore 14'; McKay 23'; Miller 45+2'	Attendance: 8,203; Referee: (Australia) Ben Williams

21 September 2008	Perth Glory	1 : 0	Wellington Phoenix	Members Equity Stadium, Perth
15:00 UTC+8	Dadi 79' (pen.)	Report; Summary		Attendance: 4,433; Referee: (Australia) Strebre Delovski

26 September 2008	Central Coast Mariners	4 : 1	Perth Glory	Bluetongue Stadium, Gosford
20:00 UTC+10	Petrovski 9'; Jedinak 29'; Caceres 45'; Osman 64'	Report; Summary	Rukavytsya 63'	Attendance: 8,016; Referee: (Australia) Mark Shield

4 October 2008	Melbourne Victory	4 : 0	Perth Glory	Telstra Dome, Melbourne
17:00 UTC+10	Brebner 25'; Allsopp 39', 71'; Vargas 46'	Report; Summary		Attendance: 18,036; Referee: (Australia) Strebre Delovski

19 October 2008	Perth Glory	2 : 1	Sydney FC	Members Equity Stadium, Perth
14:00 UTC+8	Harnwell 5', 47'	Report; Summary	Santalab 11'; Fyfe (red card) 90+1'	Attendance: 7,759; Referee: (New Zealand) Peter O'Leary

26 October 2008	Adelaide United	2 : 1	Perth Glory	Hindmarsh Stadium, Adelaide
16:30 UTC+10:30	Alemão 80'; T. Dodd 82' (pen.)	Report; Summary	Rukavytsya 55'	Attendance: 10,126; Referee: (Australia) Strebre Delovski

2 November 2008	Perth Glory	2 : 0	Wellington Phoenix	Members Equity Stadium, Perth
17:00 UTC+9	Rukavytsya 15', 70'	Report; Summary		Attendance: 7,228; Referee: (Australia) Chris Beath

9 November 2008	Perth Glory	2 : 2	Newcastle Jets	Members Equity Stadium, Perth
17:00 UTC+9	Rukavytsya 27'; Dadi 90+2' (pen.); Coyne (red card) 60'	Report; Summary	J. Griffiths 17'; T. Elrich 45'; Piorkowski (red card) 68'	Attendance: 7,837; Referee: (Australia) Matthew Breeze

23 November 2008	Queensland Roar	4 : 1	Perth Glory	Suncorp Stadium, Brisbane
17:00 UTC+10	van Dijk 45+1' (pen.); Minniecon 45+3'; Miller 55'; Nichols 82'	Report; Summary	Harnwell 57'	Attendance: 9,118; Referee: (Australia) Peter Green

29 November 2008	Perth Glory	2 : 2	Central Coast Mariners	Members Equity Stadium, Perth
18:00 UTC+9	Rukavytsya 55', 62'	Report; Summary	Jedinak 31'; Boogaard (red card) 90'; Petrovski 90+2'	Attendance: 6,496; Referee: (New Zealand) Peter O'Leary

6 December 2008	Perth Glory	3 : 1	Melbourne Victory	Members Equity Stadium, Perth
18:00 UTC+9	Dadi 19', 23'; Pellegrino 79'	Report; Summary	Ney Fabiano 55'	Attendance: 6,621; Referee: (Australia) Peter Green

13 December 2008	Wellington Phoenix	1 : 1	Perth Glory	Westpac Stadium, Wellington
19:00 UTC+13	Brown 83'	Report; Summary	Dadi 76'	Attendance: 6,362; Referee: (Australia) Strebre Delovski

21 December 2008	Sydney FC	1 : 4	Perth Glory	Sydney Football Stadium, Sydney
17:00 UTC+11	Musialik 61'	Report; Summary	Pellegrino 11'; Golec 36' (o.g.); Srhoj 49'; Middleby 69' (o.g.)	Attendance: 12,165; Referee: (Australia) Ben Williams

26 December 2008	Perth Glory	0 : 1	Adelaide United	Members Equity Stadium, Perth
20:00 UTC+9		Report; Summary	Sarkies 40'	Attendance: 12,581; Referee: (Australia) Craig Zetter

31 December 2008	Central Coast Mariners	1 : 0	Perth Glory	Bluetongue Stadium, Gosford
18:00 UTC+11	Hutchinson 80'	Report; Summary		Attendance: 15,546; Referee: (Australia) Strebre Delovski

11 January 2009	Perth Glory	3 : 2	Melbourne Victory	Members Equity Stadium, Perth
18:00 UTC+9	Dadi 32', 76'; Rukavytsya 36'	Report; Summary	Allsopp 3'; Ney Fabiano 48'; Kemp (yellow card) 33' (yellow-red card) 88'	Attendance: 9,381; Referee: (Australia) Chris Beath

18 January 2009	Newcastle Jets	2 : 1	Perth Glory	EnergyAustralia Stadium, Newcastle
17:00 UTC+11	Kovacic 41'; Milligan 55' (pen.)	Report; Summary	Bulloch 65'	Attendance: 6,665; Referee: Kris Griffith-Jones

24 January 2009	Queensland Roar	4 : 2	Perth Glory	Suncorp Stadium, Brisbane
20:00 UTC+10	Nichols 27'; Tiatto 63' van Dijk 76'; McCloughan 82'	Report; Summary	Rukavytsya 21'; Skorich 66'	Attendance: 17,367; Referee: (New Zealand) Peter O'Leary

== Home-and-Away Season ==
Pos	Team	Pld	W	D	L	GF	GA	GD	Pts	Qualification
1	Melbourne Victory (C)	21	12	2	7	39	27	+12	38	Qualification for 2010 AFC Champions League group stage and Finals series
2	Adelaide United	21	11	5	5	31	19	+12	38	Qualification for 2010 AFC Champions League group stage and Finals series
3	Queensland Roar	21	10	6	5	36	25	+11	36	Qualification for Finals series
4	Central Coast Mariners	21	7	7	7	35	32	+3	28	Qualification for Finals series
5	Sydney FC	21	7	5	9	33	32	+1	26	
6	Wellington Phoenix	21	7	5	9	23	31	−8	26	
7	Perth Glory	21	6	4	11	31	44	−13	22	
8	Newcastle Jets	21	4	6	11	21	39	−18	18	

Source: ultimatealeague.com
Rules for classification: 1) points; 2) goal difference; 3) number of goals scored.
(C) Champions

== Goal scorers ==
Last updated 24 January 2009

Name	Pre-Season	A-League	Finals	Total
(Ivory Coast) Eugene Dadi	0	10	0	10
(Australia) Nikita Rukavytsya	0	10	0	10
(Australia) Jamie Harnwell	0	3	0	3
(Australia) Adriano Pellegrino	0	2	0	2
(Argentina) Adrian Trinidad	1	1	0	2
(Australia) Wayne Srhoj	0	1	0	1
(Australia) Scott Bulloch	0	1	0	1
(Australia) Anthony Skorich	0	1	0	1
