= 2009–10 A-League =

33rd season of top-tier soccer league in Australia

A-League
- Season: 2009–10
- Dates: 6 August 2009 – 20 March 2010
- Champions: Sydney FC (2nd title)
- Premiers: Sydney FC (1st title)
- AFC Champions League: Sydney FC, Melbourne Victory
- Matches: 135
- Goals: 348 (2.58 per match)
- Top goalscorer: Shane Smeltz (19 goals)
- Best goalkeeper: Eugene Galekovic
- Biggest home win: Wellington Phoenix 6–0 Gold Coast United (25 October 2009)
- Biggest away win: Melbourne Victory 0–4 Central Coast Mariners (7 November 2009); North Queensland Fury 1–5 Central Coast Mariners (21 November 2009)
- Highest scoring: Melbourne Victory 6–2 Perth Glory (16 January 2010) (8 goals)
- Highest attendance: 30,668
- Lowest attendance: 2,616
- Average attendance: 9,796 ( 2,384)

The 2009–10 A-League was the 33rd season of top-flight soccer in Australia, and the fifth season of the A-League competition since its establishment in 2004. The season marked the addition of two new teams from Queensland. Gold Coast United FC and the North Queensland Fury FC made their A-League debuts at the start of the season. Because of this, Queensland Roar were renamed to Brisbane Roar, as they were no longer the only A-League club from Queensland. With the inception of the two new clubs, many club transfers took place both within Australia and New Zealand, and around the world.

The length of the regular season was longer than in previous years, with 27 rounds rather than 21, plus finals. The season began on 6 August, with Melbourne hosting the Central Coast at home. As well as these major changes to the league, the Pre-Season Challenge Cup was no longer held as part of the 2009–10 season due to a busier regular season schedule, and clubs attracting higher profile pre-season friendlies. The Premiership and Championship double was completed by Sydney FC with victory over Melbourne in the final match of the regular season and on penalties in the Championship Grand Final.

== Clubs ==

Team	City	Home Ground	Capacity
Adelaide United	Adelaide	Hindmarsh Stadium	17,000
Brisbane Roar	Brisbane	Suncorp Stadium	52,500
Central Coast Mariners	Gosford	Bluetongue Stadium	20,119
Gold Coast United	Gold Coast	Skilled Park	27,400
Melbourne Victory	Melbourne	Etihad Stadium	56,347
Newcastle Jets	Newcastle	Energy Australia Stadium	26,164
North Queensland Fury	Townsville	Dairy Farmers Stadium	26,500
Perth Glory	Perth	ME Bank Stadium	20,500
Sydney FC	Sydney	Sydney Football Stadium	45,500
Wellington Phoenix	Wellington	Westpac Stadium	36,000

=== Managerial changes ===
Team	Outgoing manager	Manner of departure	Date of vacancy	Table	Incoming manager	Date of appointment	Table
Sydney FC	(Australia) John Kosmina	Sacked	31 January 2009	5th (08–09)	(Czech Republic) Vítězslav Lavička	4 February 2009	Pre-season
Newcastle Jets	(Australia) Gary van Egmond	Resigned	27 June 2009	8th (08–09)	(Australia) Branko Čulina	30 June 2009	Pre-Season
Brisbane Roar	(Australia) Frank Farina	Sacked	14 October 2009	6th (09–10)	(Australia) Ange Postecoglou	16 October 2009	Round 10

=== Foreign players ===
Club	Visa 1	Visa 2	Visa 3	Visa 4	Visa 5	Non-Visa foreigner(s)	Former player(s)
Adelaide United	(Brazil) Alemão	(Brazil) Cássio	(Brazil) Cristiano	(Ghana) Lloyd Owusu	(South Korea) Shin In-seob	(Argentina) Marcos Flores^{3}	
Brisbane Roar	(Belgium) Pieter Collen	(Brazil) Henrique	(Brazil) Reinaldo	(Costa Rica) Steven Bryce	(Indonesia) Sergio van Dijk		(Scotland) Bob Malcolm
Central Coast Mariners	(England) Nicky Travis	(Scotland) Chris Doig	(Wales) Jonathan Brown	(Wales) Matt Crowell		(Malta) John Hutchinson^{2}	(Jamaica) Wolry Wolfe^{4} (New Zealand) Michael McGlinchey
Gold Coast United	(Brazil) Jefferson	(Brazil) Robson	(Ivory Coast) Adama Traoré	(Netherlands) Bas van den Brink	(Scotland) Charlie Miller	(Brazil) Anderson^{3}	(Brazil) Milson
Melbourne Victory	(Costa Rica) Marvin Angulo	(Costa Rica) Carlos Hernández	(Thailand) Surat Sukha			(New Zealand) Glen Moss^{2} (Scotland) Grant Brebner^{1}	(Brazil) Ney Fabiano (Thailand) Sutee Suksomkit
Newcastle Jets	(England) Michael Bridges	(Italy) Marcello Fiorentini	(South Korea) Song Jin-hyung			(Iraq) Ali Abbas^{3}	
North Queensland Fury	(England) Robbie Fowler	(England) James Robinson	(Japan) Kojiro Kaimoto	(New Zealand) Jeremy Brockie	(Scotland) Scott Wilson	(England) Terry Cooke^{3} (Netherlands Antilles) Dyron Daal^{3} (Sri Lanka) Jack Hingert^{2}	
Perth Glory	(England) Andy Todd	(Netherlands) Victor Sikora	(Serbia) Branko Jelić	(Scotland) Steven McGarry			(Brazil) Amaral^{4} (Ivory Coast) Eugène Dadi
Sydney FC	(Slovakia) Karol Kisel	(South Korea) Byun Sung-hwan	(Switzerland) Stephan Keller			(Northern Ireland) Terry McFlynn^{1} (Philippines) Iain Ramsay^{2}	
Wellington Phoenix	(Barbados) Paul Ifill	(Brazil) Daniel	(Brazil) Diego Walsh	(China) Jiang Chen	(England) Chris Greenacre	(Ivory Coast) Eugène Dadi^{4} (Malta) Manny Muscat^{2}	

The following do not fill a Visa position:
^{1}Those players who were born and started their professional career abroad but have since gained Australian Residency (and New Zealand Residency, in the case of Wellington Phoenix);
^{2}Australian residents (and New Zealand residents, in the case of Wellington Phoenix) who have chosen to represent another national team;
^{3}Injury Replacement Players, or National Team Replacement Players;
^{4}Guest Players (eligible to play a maximum of ten games)

=== Salary cap exemptions and captains ===
Club	Marquee	Junior Marquee	Captain	Vice-Captain
Adelaide United	None	None	(Australia) Travis Dodd	(Australia) Lucas Pantelis
Brisbane Roar	None	(Australia) Michael Zullo	(Australia) Matt McKay	None
Central Coast Mariners	None	None	(Australia) Alex Wilkinson	(Malta) John Hutchinson
Gold Coast United	(Australia) Jason Culina	(Australia) Tahj Minniecon	(Australia) Jason Culina	(Australia) Michael Thwaite
Melbourne Victory	(Australia) Archie Thompson	None	(Australia) Kevin Muscat	(Australia) Rodrigo Vargas
Newcastle Jets	(Italy) Fabio Vignaroli	(Australia) Adam D'Apuzzo	(Australia) Matt Thompson	None
North Queensland Fury	(England) Robbie Fowler	None	(England) Robbie Fowler	None
Perth Glory	(Australia) Mile Sterjovski	None	(Australia) Jacob Burns	None
Sydney FC	(Australia) John Aloisi	(Australia) Mark Bridge	(Australia) Steve Corica	None
Wellington Phoenix	None	None	(New Zealand) Andrew Durante	(New Zealand) Tim Brown

== Regular season ==
=== League table ===
Pos	Team	Pld	W	D	L	GF	GA	GD	Pts	Qualification
1	Sydney FC (C)	27	15	3	9	35	23	+12	48	Qualification for 2011 AFC Champions League group stage and Finals series
2	Melbourne Victory	27	14	5	8	47	32	+15	47	Qualification for 2011 AFC Champions League group stage and Finals series
3	Gold Coast United	27	13	5	9	39	35	+4	44	Qualification for Finals series
4	Wellington Phoenix	27	10	10	7	37	29	+8	40	Qualification for Finals series
5	Perth Glory	27	11	6	10	40	34	+6	39	Qualification for Finals series
6	Newcastle Jets	27	10	4	13	33	45	−12	34	Qualification for Finals series
7	North Queensland Fury	27	8	8	11	29	46	−17	32	
8	Central Coast Mariners	27	7	9	11	32	29	+3	30	
9	Brisbane Roar	27	8	6	13	32	42	−10	30	
10	Adelaide United	27	7	8	12	24	33	−9	29	

Source: ultimatealeague.com
Rules for classification: 1) points; 2) goal difference; 3) number of goals scored.
(C) Champions

=== Home and away season ===
The 2009–10 A-League season was played over 27 rounds, followed by a finals series.

==== Round 1 ====
6 August 2009	Melbourne Victory	0–2	Central Coast Mariners	Etihad Stadium, Melbourne
19:30 UTC+10		Report; Summary	Simon 10'; McGlinchey 16'	Attendance: 18,885; Referee: Matthew Breeze

7 August 2009	Adelaide United	1–0	Perth Glory	Hindmarsh Stadium, Adelaide
20:00 UTC+9:30	T. Dodd 30' (pen.)	Report; Summary		Attendance: 13,847; Referee: Craig Zetter

8 August 2009	North Queensland Fury	2–3	Sydney FC	Dairy Farmers Stadium, Townsville
17:30 UTC+10	R. Griffiths 41'; Fowler 60' (pen.)	Report; Summary	Aloisi 4', 73' (pen.); Danning 28'	Attendance: 8,897; Referee: Strebre Delovski

8 August 2009	Brisbane Roar	1–3	Gold Coast United	Suncorp Stadium, Brisbane
19:30 UTC+10	van Dijk 90+1' (pen.)	Report; Summary	Smeltz 17'; Culina 59'; Robson 90+3'	Attendance: 19,902; Referee: Peter Green

9 August 2009	Newcastle Jets	3–2	Wellington Phoenix	EnergyAustralia Stadium, Newcastle
15:00 UTC+10	Hoffman 12', 23'; Naidovski 84'	Report; Summary	Sigmund 26'; Greenacre 43'	Attendance: 6,654; Referee: Chris Beath

==== Round 2 ====
14 August 2009	Central Coast Mariners	1–1	Newcastle Jets	Bluetongue Stadium, Gosford
20:00 UTC+10	Boogaard 50'	Report; Summary	Song 47'	Attendance: 9,573; Referee: Ben Williams

15 August 2009	Gold Coast United	5–0	North Queensland Fury	Skilled Park, Gold Coast
17:30 UTC+10	Smeltz 30', 54' (pen.), 63', 64'; Minniecon 80'	Report; Summary		Attendance: 7,526; Referee: Chris Beath

15 August 2009	Melbourne Victory	3–3	Brisbane Roar	Etihad Stadium, Melbourne
19:30 UTC+10	Hernández 33', 70'; Allsopp 63'	Report; Summary	Tiatto 22' van Dijk 24' (pen.); Henrique 37'	Attendance: 18,603; Referee: Strebre Delovski

16 August 2009	Wellington Phoenix	2–1	Perth Glory	Westpac Stadium, Wellington
17:00 UTC+12	Ifill 24'; Bertos 85'	Report; Summary	Sikora 3'	Attendance: 10,024; Referee: Peter O'Leary

16 August 2009	Sydney FC	1–0	Adelaide United	Sydney Football Stadium, Sydney
17:00 UTC+10	Bridge 77'	Report; Summary		Attendance: 14,924; Referee: Matthew Breeze

==== Round 3 ====
21 August 2009	Adelaide United	0–2	Gold Coast United	Hindmarsh Stadium, Adelaide
19:30 UTC+9:30		Report; Summary	Smeltz 13'; Fitzsimmons 51'	Attendance: 12,741; Referee: Matthew Breeze

22 August 2009	Central Coast Mariners	0–0	Sydney FC	Bluetongue Stadium, Gosford
15:00 UTC+10		Report; Summary		Attendance: 10,029; Referee: Strebre Delovski

22 August 2009	North Queensland Fury	0–1	Melbourne Victory	Dairy Farmers Stadium, Townsville
17:00 UTC+10		Report; Summary	A. Thompson 45'	Attendance: 6,514; Referee: Peter Green

23 August 2009	Brisbane Roar	1–1	Wellington Phoenix	Suncorp Stadium, Brisbane
15:00 UTC+10	van Dijk 10'	Report; Summary	Greenacre 85'	Attendance: 7,084; Referee: Chris Beath

23 August 2009	Perth Glory	2–0	Newcastle Jets	ME Bank Stadium, Perth
15:00 UTC+8	Shroj 24'; Pellegrino 73'	Report; Summary		Attendance: 9,398; Referee: Craig Zetter

==== Round 4 ====
28 August 2009	Adelaide United	3–3	North Queensland Fury	Hindmarsh Stadium, Adelaide
19:30 UTC+9:30	Pantelis 23', 90+3' (pen.); Owusu 34'	Report; Summary	Fowler 5'; Daal 84'; McBreen 87'	Attendance: 10,773; Referee: Peter Green

28 August 2009	Perth Glory	2–1	Melbourne Victory	ME Bank Stadium, Perth
20:00 UTC+8	Jelić 5', 54'	Report; Summary	A. Thompson 9'	Attendance: 8,057; Referee: Chris Beath

29 August 2009	Brisbane Roar	1–0	Central Coast Mariners	Suncorp Stadium, Brisbane
15:00 UTC+10	Moore 11'	Report; Summary		Attendance: 6,433; Referee: Ben Williams

30 August 2009	Newcastle Jets	1–0	Gold Coast United	EnergyAustralia Stadium, Newcastle
15:00 UTC+10	Rooney 39'	Report; Summary		Attendance: 6,390; Referee: Matthew Breeze

30 August 2009	Sydney FC	2–0	Wellington Phoenix	Sydney Football Stadium, Sydney
17:00 UTC+10	Gan 77'; Aloisi 81'	Report; Summary		Attendance: 11,718; Referee: Strebre Delovski

==== Round 5 ====
3 September 2009	Melbourne Victory	1–1	Newcastle Jets	Etihad Stadium, Melbourne
19:30 UTC+10	A. Thompson 42'	Report; Summary	Haliti 87'	Attendance: 15,168; Referee: Chris Beath

4 September 2009	Wellington Phoenix	1–1	Adelaide United	Westpac Stadium, Wellington
19:30 UTC+12	Ifill 35'	Report; Summary	Fyfe 42'	Attendance: 7,523; Referee: Michael Hester

4 September 2009	Central Coast Mariners	2–1	Perth Glory	Canberra Stadium, Canberra
20:00 UTC+10	Wilkinson 42'; Simon 89'	Report; Summary	Sterjovski 82'	Attendance: 5,193; Referee: Ben Williams

5 September 2009	Gold Coast United	2–1	Sydney FC	Skilled Park, Gold Coast
17:00 UTC+10	Smeltz 45+1', 56'	Report; Summary	Corica 75'	Attendance: 6,406; Referee: Strebre Delovski

5 September 2009	North Queensland Fury	1–1	Brisbane Roar	Dairy Farmers Stadium, Townsville
19:00 UTC+10	Fowler 7'	Report; Summary	Nichols 85'	Attendance: 7,173; Referee: Matthew Breeze

==== Round 6 ====
11 September 2009	Adelaide United	1–0	Central Coast Mariners	Hindmarsh Stadium, Adelaide
19:30 UTC+9:30	Cássio 33'	Report; Summary		Attendance: 10,262; Referee: Strebre Delovski

12 September 2009	Newcastle Jets	0–3	Brisbane Roar	EnergyAustralia Stadium, Newcastle
17:30 UTC+10		Report; Summary	Henrique 24'; Reinaldo 26'; Miller 70'	Attendance: 6,026; Referee: Ben Williams

12 September 2009	Sydney FC	0–1	North Queensland Fury	Sydney Football Stadium, Sydney
19:30 UTC+10		Report; Summary	Fowler 54'	Attendance: 16,699; Referee: Chris Beath

13 September 2009	Melbourne Victory	1–1	Wellington Phoenix	Etihad Stadium, Melbourne
15:00 UTC+10	Hernández 4'	Report; Summary	T. Brown 30'	Attendance: 17,644; Referee: Craig Zetter

13 September 2009	Perth Glory	2–2	Gold Coast United	ME Bank Stadium, Perth
15:00 UTC+8	Jelić 14'; Sikora 16'	Report; Summary	Burns 53' (o.g.); Smeltz 90+1'	Attendance: 9,408; Referee: Matthew Breeze

==== Round 7 ====
18 September 2009	Adelaide United	0–2	Melbourne Victory	Hindmarsh Stadium, Adelaide
19:30 UTC+9:30		Report; Summary	Ward 7'; Brebner 90'	Attendance: 15,038; Referee: Strebre Delovski

19 September 2009	Central Coast Mariners	3–0	Gold Coast United	Bluetongue Stadium, Gosford
19:30 UTC+10	Travis 26'; Simon 54'; Hutchinson 70'	Report; Summary		Attendance: 7,943; Referee: Matthew Breeze

20 September 2009	Wellington Phoenix	1–1	North Queensland Fury	Westpac Stadium, Wellington
15:00 UTC+12	Bertos 6'	Report; Summary	Grossman 90+4'	Attendance: 9,713; Referee: Peter Green

20 September 2009	Sydney FC	2–1	Newcastle Jets	Sydney Football Stadium, Sydney
15:00 UTC+10	Bridge 26'; Corica 55' (pen.)	Report; Summary	M. Thompson 37'	Attendance: 10,357; Referee: Ben Williams

20 September 2009	Brisbane Roar	2–4	Perth Glory	Suncorp Stadium, Brisbane
17:00 UTC+10	Henrique 50'; C. Coyne 64' (o.g.)	Report; Summary	McCloughan 1' (o.g.); Shroj 41'; Jelić 61'; Reddy 76' (o.g.)	Attendance: 7,367; Referee: Chris Beath

==== Round 8 ====
25 September 2009	Newcastle Jets	0–1	Perth Glory	EnergyAustralia Stadium, Newcastle
20:00 UTC+10		Report; Summary	Sterjovski 81' (pen.)	Attendance: 4,738; Referee: Matthew Breeze

26 September 2009	Gold Coast United	2–3	Melbourne Victory	Skilled Park, Gold Coast
19:30 UTC+10	Culina 18' (pen.); Porter 45'	Report; Summary	Hernández 22'; A. Thompson 43'; K. Muscat 86' (pen.)	Attendance: 5,603; Referee: Peter Green

27 September 2009	Wellington Phoenix	0–0	Central Coast Mariners	Westpac Stadium, Wellington
16:00 UTC+13		Report; Summary		Attendance: 6,769; Referee: (New Zealand) Michael Hester

27 September 2009	Brisbane Roar	1–0	Sydney FC	Suncorp Stadium, Brisbane
15:00 UTC+10	van Dijk 85'	Report; Summary		Attendance: 7,677; Referee: Strebre Delovski

27 September 2009	North Queensland Fury	0–2	Adelaide United	Dairy Farmers Stadium, Townsville
17:00 UTC+10		Report; Summary	Pantelis 60'; Leckie 90+2'	Attendance: 6,745; Referee: Chris Beath

==== Round 9 ====
2 October 2009	Gold Coast United	0–0	Wellington Phoenix	Skilled Park, Gold Coast
20:00 UTC+10		Report; Summary		Attendance: 4,209; Referee: Gerard Parsons

3 October 2009	Perth Glory	1–1	North Queensland Fury	ME Bank Stadium, Perth
15:30 UTC+8	Sterjovski 49' (pen.)	Report; Summary	Velaphi 70' (o.g.)	Attendance: 12,822; Referee: Ben Williams

3 October 2009	Melbourne Victory	2–1	Brisbane Roar	Etihad Stadium, Melbourne
19:30 UTC+10	Ney Fabiano 3'; Leijer 72'	Report; Summary	Reinaldo 11'	Attendance: 19,587; Referee: Strebre Delovski

5 October 2009	Sydney FC	1–0	Central Coast Mariners	Sydney Football Stadium, Sydney
15:00 UTC+11	McFlynn 20'	Report; Summary		Attendance: 13,887; Referee: Matthew Breeze

5 October 2009	Adelaide United	1–1	Newcastle Jets	Hindmarsh Stadium, Adelaide
16:30 UTC+10:30	Cássio 76'	Report; Summary	Song 6'	Attendance: 12,090; Referee: Chris Beath

==== Round 10 ====
9 October 2009	Melbourne Victory	0–3	Sydney FC	Etihad Stadium, Melbourne
20:00 UTC+11		Report; Summary	Brosque 14'; Bridge 15', 19'	Attendance: 30,668; Referee: Peter Green

9 October 2009	Perth Glory	1–0	Adelaide United	ME Bank Stadium, Perth
19:00 UTC+8	Sikora 79'	Report; Summary		Attendance: 9,482; Referee: Chris Beath

11 October 2009	Central Coast Mariners	1–1	North Queensland Fury	Bluetongue Stadium, Gosford
15:00 UTC+11	Simon 1'	Report; Summary	McBreen 75'	Attendance: 8,042; Referee: Ryan Shepheard

11 October 2009	Brisbane Roar	0–1	Gold Coast United	Suncorp Stadium, Brisbane
16:00 UTC+10		Report; Summary	Porter 31'	Attendance: 8,882; Referee: Ben Williams

4 November 2009	Wellington Phoenix	3–0	Newcastle Jets	Westpac Stadium, Wellington
20:00 UTC+13	T. Brown 27'; Greenacre 55'; Ifill 90+1'	Report; Summary		Attendance: 4,115; Referee: Ben Williams

==== Round 11 ====
16 October 2009	Adelaide United	2–1	Sydney FC	Hindmarsh Stadium, Adelaide
19:30 UTC+10:30	Cristiano 30', 54'	Report; Summary	Aloisi 78'	Attendance: 10,291; Referee: Strebre Delovski

17 October 2009	Brisbane Roar	0–3	Central Coast Mariners	Suncorp Stadium, Brisbane
17:30 UTC+10		Report; Summary	Travis 4'; Hutchinson 18'; Bojić 70'	Attendance: 7,434; Referee: Peter Green

17 October 2009	North Queensland Fury	1–1	Wellington Phoenix	Dairy Farmers Stadium, Townsville
19:30 UTC+10	Fowler 84'	Report; Summary	T. Brown 6'	Attendance: 6,191; Referee: Chris Beath

18 October 2009	Newcastle Jets	1–3	Melbourne Victory	EnergyAustralia Stadium, Newcastle
15:00 UTC+11	Haliti 22'	Report; Summary	A. Thompson 62'; Pondeljak 79'; Hernández 85'	Attendance: 6,029; Referee: Ben Williams

18 October 2009	Gold Coast United	2–1	Perth Glory	Skilled Park, Gold Coast
16:00 UTC+10	Neville 13' (o.g.); Smeltz 56'	Report; Summary	Howarth 55'	Attendance: 4,509; Referee: Matthew Breeze

==== Round 12 ====
23 October 2009	Newcastle Jets	2–1	Central Coast Mariners	EnergyAustralia Stadium, Newcastle
20:00 UTC+11	Bridges 8'; Haliti 14'	Report; Summary	Kwasnik 19'	Attendance: 6,188; Referee: Strebre Delovski

24 October 2009	Melbourne Victory	3–1	Adelaide United	Etihad Stadium, Melbourne
18:30 UTC+11	Dugandžić 18', 56'; Leijer 89'	Report; Summary	Hughes 64'	Attendance: 21,182; Referee: Ben Williams

24 October 2009	North Queensland Fury	2–1	Perth Glory	Dairy Farmers Stadium, Townsville
19:30 UTC+10	Fowler 65'; Daal 71'	Report; Summary	Sikora 25'	Attendance: 6,332; Referee: Peter Green

25 October 2009	Wellington Phoenix	6–0	Gold Coast United	Westpac Stadium, Wellington
17:00 UTC+13	Daniel 28', 53'; T. Brown 48'; Greenacre 54'; Ifill 59'; Hearfield 82'	Report; Summary		Attendance: 6,571; Referee: (New Zealand) Peter O'Leary

25 October 2009	Sydney FC	2–1	Brisbane Roar	Sydney Football Stadium, Sydney
17:00 UTC+11	Brosque 55'; Kisel 69'	Report; Summary	Cernak 73'	Attendance: 8,456; Referee: Matthew Breeze

==== Round 13 ====
30 October 2009	Brisbane Roar	1–1	Newcastle Jets	Suncorp Stadium, Brisbane
19:30 UTC+10	van Dijk 36' (pen.)	Report; Summary	Haliti 32'	Attendance: 7,509; Referee: Chris Beath

31 October 2009	Central Coast Mariners	0–0	Adelaide United	Canberra Stadium, Canberra
19:00 UTC+11		Report; Summary		Attendance: 5,437; Referee: Ben Williams

31 October 2009	Gold Coast United	0–2	North Queensland Fury	Skilled Park, Gold Coast
20:00 UTC+10		Report; Summary	Fowler 64', 76' (pen.)	Attendance: 2,616; Referee: Craig Zetter

1 November 2009	Sydney FC	3–1	Wellington Phoenix	Sydney Football Stadium, Sydney
17:00 UTC+11	Bridge 15', 35'; Corica 32'	Report; Summary	Barbarouses 81'	Attendance: 10,653; Referee: Gerard Parsons

1 November 2009	Perth Glory	1–2	Melbourne Victory	ME Bank Stadium, Perth
16:00 UTC+8	Sterjovski 19'	Report; Summary	C. Coyne 7' (o.g.); Hernández 67'	Attendance: 10,035; Referee: Strebre Delovski

==== Round 14 ====
6 November 2009	Adelaide United	0–2	Brisbane Roar	Hindmarsh Stadium, Adelaide
19:30 UTC+10:30		Report; Summary	van Dijk 35' (pen.), 51'	Attendance: 11,209; Referee: (Australia) Craig Zetter

7 November 2009	Melbourne Victory	0–4	Central Coast Mariners	Etihad Stadium, Melbourne
19:00 UTC+11		Report; Summary	Kwasnik 15'; Simon 75'; Heffernan 80'; Mrdja 84'	Attendance: 18,531; Referee: (Australia) Strebre Delovski

7 November 2009	Gold Coast United	1–0	Sydney FC	Skilled Park, Gold Coast
20:00 UTC+10	Smeltz 36'	Report; Summary		Attendance: 5,364; Referee: Ben Williams

8 November 2009	Wellington Phoenix	1–1	Perth Glory	Westpac Stadium, Wellington
17:00 UTC+13	Ifill 82'	Report; Summary	Shroj 68'	Attendance: 6,930; Referee: Matthew Gillett

8 November 2009	Newcastle Jets	2–0	North Queensland Fury	EnergyAustralia Stadium, Newcastle
17:00 UTC+11	M. Thompson 55'; Bridges 85' (pen.)	Report; Summary		Attendance: 6,271; Referee: Ryan Shepheard

==== Round 15 ====
20 November 2009	Adelaide United	1–1	Gold Coast United	Hindmarsh Stadium, Adelaide
19:30 UTC+10:30	Leckie 90+3'	Report; Summary	Fitzsimmons 64'	Attendance: 9,578; Referee: Chris Beath

21 November 2009	Brisbane Roar	0–1	Melbourne Victory	Suncorp Stadium, Brisbane
18:00 UTC+10		Report; Summary	A. Thompson 8'	Attendance: 9,904; Referee: Ben Williams

21 November 2009	North Queensland Fury	1–5	Central Coast Mariners	Dairy Farmers Stadium, Townsville
20:00 UTC+10	R. Griffiths 68'	Report; Summary	Bojić 22'; Mrdja 35', 59'; A. Elrich 62'; Hutchinson 82'	Attendance: 7,587; Referee: Gerard Parsons

22 November 2009	Newcastle Jets	0–1	Wellington Phoenix	EnergyAustralia Stadium, Newcastle
17:00 UTC+11		Report; Summary	Ifill 14'	Attendance: 4,329; Referee: Peter Green

22 November 2009	Perth Glory	2–0	Sydney FC	ME Bank Stadium, Perth
16:00 UTC+8	Bulloch 57'; Jelić 88'	Report; Summary		Attendance: 8,932; Referee: Strebre Delovski

==== Round 16 ====
27 November 2009	Central Coast Mariners	0–0	Perth Glory	Bluetongue Stadium, Gosford
20:00 UTC+11		Report; Summary		Attendance: 7,857; Referee: Gerard Parsons

28 November 2009	Melbourne Victory	4–0	Gold Coast United	Etihad Stadium, Melbourne
19:00 UTC+11	Kruse 28'; Ward 45+1'; A. Thompson 54', 68'	Report; Summary		Attendance: 20,537; Referee: Ben Williams

28 November 2009	North Queensland Fury	2–1	Adelaide United	Dairy Farmers Stadium, Townsville
20:00 UTC+10	McBreen 38'; Fowler 67'	Report; Summary	Cristiano 90+2'	Attendance: 5,356; Referee: Peter Green

29 November 2009	Sydney FC	1–3	Newcastle Jets	Sydney Football Stadium, Sydney
17:00 UTC+11	Brosque 75'	Report; Summary	Bridges 22' (pen.), 55'; M. Thompson 58'	Attendance: 9,996; Referee: Strebre Delovski

29 November 2009	Brisbane Roar	4–1	Wellington Phoenix	Suncorp Stadium, Brisbane
18:00 UTC+10	Reinaldo 17', 56' van Dijk 79'; D. Dodd 90+1'	Report; Summary	Greenacre 27'	Attendance: 6,307; Referee: Alan Milliner

==== Round 17 ====
4 December 2009	Wellington Phoenix	1–1	Melbourne Victory	Westpac Stadium, Wellington
19:30 UTC+13	T. Brown 58'	Report; Summary	Vargas 87'	Attendance: 8,206; Referee: (New Zealand) Michael Hester

4 December 2009	Adelaide United	0–2	Newcastle Jets	Hindmarsh Stadium, Adelaide
19:30 UTC+10:30		Report; Summary	M. Thompson 45+1'; Song 81' (pen.)	Attendance: 8,502; Referee: Kevin Docherty

5 December 2009	Sydney FC	4–1	North Queensland Fury	Sydney Football Stadium, Sydney
19:00 UTC+11	Aloisi 13'; Brosque 19', 58'; Corica 64'	Report; Summary	R. Griffiths 61'	Attendance: 11,871; Referee: Ben Williams

5 December 2009	Gold Coast United	2–1	Central Coast Mariners	Skilled Park, Gold Coast
20:00 UTC+10	Smeltz 67'; Barisic 76'	Report; Summary	Simon 38'	Attendance: 4,117; Referee: Peter Green

6 December 2009	Perth Glory	1–1	Brisbane Roar	ME Bank Stadium, Perth
16:00 UTC+8	Harnwell 78'	Report; Summary	DeVere 52'	Attendance: 7,217; Referee: Strebre Delovski

==== Round 18 ====
11 December 2009	North Queensland Fury	1–0	Perth Glory	Dairy Farmers Stadium, Townsville
19:30 UTC+10	Williams 32'	Report; Summary		Attendance: 5,287; Referee: Peter Green

12 December 2009	Wellington Phoenix	0–1	Sydney FC	FMG Stadium, Palmerston North
19:00 UTC+13		Report; Summary	Corica 16' (pen.)	Attendance: 6,459; Referee: (New Zealand) Michael Hester

12 December 2009	Central Coast Mariners	0–3	Melbourne Victory	Bluetongue Stadium, Gosford
19:00 UTC+11		Report; Summary	Hernández 57'; Kemp 70'; Boogaard 77' (o.g.)	Attendance: 7,571; Referee: Ryan Shepheard

12 December 2009	Brisbane Roar	0–1	Adelaide United	Suncorp Stadium, Brisbane
20:00 UTC+10		Report; Summary	Barbiero 78'	Attendance: 5,801; Referee: Strebre Delovski

13 December 2009	Newcastle Jets	3–2	Gold Coast United	EnergyAustralia Stadium, Newcastle
17:00 UTC+11	Wheelhouse 6'; Rooney 70'; Petrovski 82'	Report; Summary	Smeltz 44' (pen.), 84'	Attendance: 5,254; Referee: Ben Williams

==== Round 19 ====
16 December 2009	Brisbane Roar	2–0	North Queensland Fury	Suncorp Stadium, Brisbane
19:30 UTC+10	van Dijk 20', 42'	Report; Summary		Attendance: 11,530; Referee: Matthew Gillett

23 December 2009	Sydney FC	1–0	Central Coast Mariners	Sydney Football Stadium, Sydney
19:30 UTC+11	Brosque 34'	Report; Summary		Attendance: 12,689; Referee: Matthew Breeze

13 January 2010	Gold Coast United	2–0	Newcastle Jets	Skilled Park, Gold Coast
19:30 UTC+10	Culina 33'; J. Brown 38'	Report; Summary		Attendance: 4,853; Referee: (Australia) Chris Beath

19 January 2010	Adelaide United	2–3	Perth Glory	Hindmarsh Stadium, Adelaide
19:30 UTC+10:30	Pantelis 13'; T. Dodd 52'	Report; Summary	Burns 63', 69'; McBreen 78'	Attendance: 8,904; Referee: Ben Williams

26 January 2010	Melbourne Victory	4–0	Wellington Phoenix	Etihad Stadium, Melbourne
18:00 UTC+11	T. Brown 17' (o.g.); A. Thompson 50'; Hernández 66'; Kemp 87'	Report; Summary		Attendance: 18,819; Referee: Chris Beath

==== Round 20 ====
18 December 2009	Adelaide United	1–1	Wellington Phoenix	Hindmarsh Stadium, Adelaide
19:30 UTC+10:30	Alemão 57'	Report; Summary	Cáceres 77'	Attendance: 9,070; Referee: Craig Zetter

19 December 2009	Central Coast Mariners	2–3	Brisbane Roar	Bluetongue Stadium, Gosford
18:00 UTC+11	Travis 35'; Macallister 77'	Report; Summary	Oar 10' van Dijk 22'; McKay 90+1'	Attendance: 5,684; Referee: Alan Milliner

19 December 2009	Melbourne Victory	0–0	Sydney FC	Etihad Stadium, Melbourne
20:00 UTC+11		Report; Summary		Attendance: 27,344; Referee: Strebre Delovski

20 December 2009	Newcastle Jets	3–2	North Queensland Fury	EnergyAustralia Stadium, Newcastle
17:00 UTC+11	Tadrosse 24' (o.g.); Song 38'; Petrovski 83'	Report; Summary	Daal 44', 61'	Attendance: 7,026; Referee: Gerard Parsons

20 December 2009	Gold Coast United	2–0	Perth Glory	Skilled Park, Gold Coast
18:00 UTC+10	Smeltz 3'; Miller 76'	Report; Summary		Attendance: 4,310; Referee: Chris Beath

==== Round 21 ====
26 December 2009	Gold Coast United	5–1	Brisbane Roar	Skilled Park, Gold Coast
17:00 UTC+10	Rees 45+1', 53'; Smeltz 50' (pen.), 61', 77'	Report; Summary	McKay 7'	Attendance: 10,024; Referee: Strebre Delovski

26 December 2009	Perth Glory	4–0	Newcastle Jets	ME Bank Stadium, Perth
17:00 UTC+8	Sekulovski 19'; Harnwell 24', 69'; Sterjovski 36' (pen.)	Report; Summary		Attendance: 9,418; Referee: Ben Williams

27 December 2009	Sydney FC	1–0	Adelaide United	Sydney Football Stadium, Sydney
19:00 UTC+11	Corica 49'	Report; Summary		Attendance: 11,741; Referee: Chris Beath

27 December 2009	North Queensland Fury	1–0	Melbourne Victory	Dairy Farmers Stadium, Townsville
20:00 UTC+10	Daal 31'	Report; Summary		Attendance: 7,031; Referee: Peter Green

31 December 2009	Central Coast Mariners	0–2	Wellington Phoenix	Bluetongue Stadium, Gosford
18:00 UTC+11		Report; Summary	Ifill 47' (pen.), 81'	Attendance: 11,137; Referee: Matthew Breeze

==== Round 22 ====
9 January 2010	Wellington Phoenix	3–1	Brisbane Roar	Westpac Stadium, Wellington
19:00 UTC+13	T. Brown 26'; Dadi 56', 62'	Report; Summary	van Dijk 88'	Attendance: 8,927; Referee: (New Zealand) Peter O'Leary

9 January 2010	Central Coast Mariners	1–1	North Queensland Fury	Bluetongue Stadium, Gosford
19:00 UTC+11	Mrdja 3'	Report; Summary	Brockie 20'	Attendance: 6,556; Referee: Ryan Shepheard

9 January 2010	Gold Coast United	1–1	Adelaide United	Skilled Park, Gold Coast
20:00 UTC+10	Smeltz 90+3'	Report; Summary	T. Dodd 20'	Attendance: 4,505; Referee: Peter Green

10 January 2010	Newcastle Jets	3–2	Melbourne Victory	EnergyAustralia Stadium, Newcastle
17:00 UTC+11	M. Thompson 26'; Bridges 45'; Haliti 56'	Report; Summary	K. Muscat 35' (pen.); Hernández 90+1'	Attendance: 6,979; Referee: Matthew Breeze

10 January 2010	Perth Glory	0–0	Sydney FC	ME Bank Stadium, Perth
16:00 UTC+8		Report; Summary		Attendance: 9,319; Referee: Strebre Delovski

==== Round 23 ====
15 January 2010	Wellington Phoenix	3–0	North Queensland Fury	Westpac Stadium, Wellington
19:30 UTC+13	Dadi 47'; Ifill 78'; McKain 90'	Report; Summary		Attendance: 7,727; Referee: Peter Green

15 January 2010	Adelaide United	1–1	Central Coast Mariners	Hindmarsh Stadium, Adelaide
19:30 UTC+10:30	T. Dodd 43'	Report; Summary	Mrdja 39' (pen.)	Attendance: 10,156; Referee: Chris Beath

16 January 2010	Melbourne Victory	6–2	Perth Glory	Etihad Stadium, Melbourne
19:00 UTC+11	A. Thompson 4'; Kruse 12', 26', 39'; K. Muscat 81' (pen.); Hernández 83'	Report; Summary	Vargas 20' (o.g.); Sterjovski 52'	Attendance: 20,448; Referee: Strebre Delovski

16 January 2010	Brisbane Roar	0–2	Newcastle Jets	Suncorp Stadium, Brisbane
20:00 UTC+10		Report; Summary	M. Thompson 50'; Bridges 55' (pen.)	Attendance: 6,656; Referee: Matthew Breeze

17 January 2010	Sydney FC	0–1	Gold Coast United	Sydney Football Stadium, Sydney
17:00 UTC+11		Report; Summary	J. Porter 19'	Attendance: 14,941; Referee: Ben Williams

==== Round 24 ====
22 January 2010	Central Coast Mariners	1–1	Gold Coast United	Bluetongue Stadium, Gosford
20:00 UTC+11	Mrdja 68' (pen.)	Report; Summary	J. Porter 66'	Attendance: 5,724; Referee: Chris Beath

22 January 2010	Perth Glory	2–0	Wellington Phoenix	ME Bank Stadium, Perth
19:00 UTC+8	McBreen 23'; Howarth 42'	Report; Summary		Attendance: 9,368; Referee: Ryan Shepheard

23 January 2010	Melbourne Victory	2–0	Adelaide United	Etihad Stadium, Melbourne
19:00 UTC+11	Pondeljak 1'; K. Muscat 90+4' (pen.)	Report; Summary		Attendance: 20,361; Referee: Matthew Breeze

23 January 2010	North Queensland Fury	1–1	Brisbane Roar	Dairy Farmers Stadium, Townsville
20:00 UTC+10	Williams 55'	Report; Summary	DeVere 49'	Attendance: 7,610; Referee: Gerard Parsons

24 January 2010	Newcastle Jets	1–3	Sydney FC	EnergyAustralia Stadium, Newcastle
17:00 UTC+11	Wheelhouse 33'	Report; Summary	Aloisi 45'; Musialik 45+4'; Payne 90+2'	Attendance: 9,892; Referee: Peter Green

==== Round 25 ====
29 January 2010	Gold Coast United	1–0	Melbourne Victory	Skilled Park, Gold Coast
19:30 UTC+10	Caravella 77'	Report; Summary		Attendance: 7,249; Referee: Chris Beath

30 January 2010	Wellington Phoenix	1–0	Adelaide United	AMI Stadium, Christchurch
19:00 UTC+13	McKain 22'	Report; Summary		Attendance: 19,258; Referee: (New Zealand) Peter O'Leary

30 January 2010	Brisbane Roar	1–0	Sydney FC	Suncorp Stadium, Brisbane
18:00 UTC+10	van Dijk 89'	Report; Summary		Attendance: 8,613; Referee: (New Zealand) Michael Hester

31 January 2010	Perth Glory	3–1	Central Coast Mariners	ME Bank Stadium, Perth
16:00 UTC+8	McBreen 1', 13'; Jukic 45+1'	Report; Summary	Kwasnik 49'	Attendance: 8,160; Referee: Gerard Parsons

2 February 2010	North Queensland Fury	2–1	Newcastle Jets	Dairy Farmers Stadium, Townsville
19:30 UTC+10	Grossman 39'; Tadrosse 81'	Report; Summary	M. Thompson 19'	Attendance: 4,156; Referee: Chris Beath

==== Round 26 ====
5 February 2010	Melbourne Victory	2–0	North Queensland Fury	Etihad Stadium, Melbourne
20:00 UTC+11	Hernández 36', 66'	Report; Summary		Attendance: 22,726; Referee: Ben Williams

6 February 2010	Adelaide United	2–0	Brisbane Roar	Hindmarsh Stadium, Adelaide
19:30 UTC+10:30	Barbiero 7'; Pantelis 51'	Report; Summary		Attendance: 8,244; Referee: Gerard Parsons

7 February 2010	Sydney FC	3–2	Perth Glory	Parramatta Stadium, Sydney
17:00 UTC+11	Corica 24' (pen.); Aloisi 48', 87'	Report; Summary	Shroj 45+2'; McBreen 79'	Attendance: 8,359; Referee: Chris Beath

7 February 2010	Gold Coast United	0–1	Wellington Phoenix	Skilled Park, Gold Coast
18:00 UTC+10		Report; Summary	Ifill 45+2' (pen.)	Attendance: 4,202; Referee: Matthew Breeze

8 February 2010	Central Coast Mariners	3–0	Newcastle Jets	Bluetongue Stadium, Gosford
19:30 UTC+11	Boogaard 17'; Kwasnik 50'; Simon 72'	Report; Summary		Attendance: 5,842; Referee: Peter Green

==== Round 27 ====
12 February 2010	Wellington Phoenix	3–0	Central Coast Mariners	Westpac Stadium, Wellington
19:30 UTC+13	T. Brown 14'; Ifill 79', 81'	Report; Summary		Attendance: 14,327; Referee: Chris Beath

12 February 2010	Newcastle Jets	1–2	Adelaide United	EnergyAustralia Stadium, Newcastle
20:00 UTC+11	Ali Abbas 41'	Report; Summary	Barbiero 8'; Leckie 74'	Attendance: 6,880; Referee: Gerard Parsons

13 February 2010	Perth Glory	2–0	Brisbane Roar	ME Bank Stadium, Perth
16:00 UTC+8	Neville 9'; Bulloch 73'	Report; Summary		Attendance: 8,054; Referee: Peter Green

13 February 2010	North Queensland Fury	2–1	Gold Coast United	Dairy Farmers Stadium, Townsville
20:00 UTC+10	Williams 9'; Cooke 83'	Report; Summary	J. Porter 62'	Attendance: 8,517; Referee: Ben Williams

14 February 2010	Sydney FC	2–0	Melbourne Victory	Sydney Football Stadium, Sydney
17:00 UTC+11	Kisel 34'; Aloisi 49'	Report; Summary		Attendance: 25,407; Referee: Matthew Breeze

== Finals series ==
=== Bracket ===
Elimination finals
3	Gold Coast United	0 (5)
6	Newcastle Jets (p.s.o.)	0 (6)
4	Wellington Phoenix (p.s.o.)	1 (4)
5	Perth Glory	1 (2)

Semifinals
1	Sydney FC	1	2
2	Melbourne Victory	2	2
Wellington Phoenix	3
Newcastle Jets	1

Preliminary final
Sydney FC	4
Wellington Phoenix	2

Grand final
Melbourne Victory	1 (2)
Sydney FC (p.s.o.)	1 (4)

=== Elimination finals ===
20 February 2010
19:00 UTC+10

Gold Coast United	0–0 (a.e.t.)	Newcastle Jets
	Report; Summary
Penalties
Culina (penalty scored); Djulbic (penalty scored); Thwaite (penalty scored); Anderson (penalty scored); Smeltz (penalty scored); Rees (penalty missed); Caravella (penalty missed)	5–6	(penalty scored) T. Elrich; (penalty scored) Petrovski; (penalty scored) Patafta; (penalty scored) M. Thompson; (penalty scored) Miličević; (penalty missed) Song; (penalty scored) Topor-Stanley

Skilled Park, Gold Coast
Attendance: 4,109
Referee: Matthew Breeze

21 February 2010
17:00 UTC+13

Wellington Phoenix	1–1 (a.e.t.)	Perth Glory
Greenacre 37'	Report; Summary	Neville 67'
Penalties
Ifill (penalty scored); Durante (penalty scored); T. Brown (penalty scored); Caceres (penalty scored)	4–2	(penalty scored) McGarry; (penalty missed) Sekulovski; (penalty missed) Bulloch; (penalty scored) McBreen

Westpac Stadium, Wellington
Attendance: 24,278
Referee: Strebre Delovski

=== Semi-finals ===
==== Major semi-final ====
18 February 2010
20:00 UTC+11

Melbourne Victory	2–1	Sydney FC
Mrdja 16'; Hernández 40'	Report; Summary	Aloisi 42'

Etihad Stadium, Melbourne
Attendance: 18,453
Referee: Peter Green

7 March 2010
17:00 UTC+11

Sydney FC	2–2 (a.e.t.)	Melbourne Victory
Kisel 36' (pen.); Bridge 54'	Report; Summary	Kruse 15'; A. Thompson 113'

Sydney Football Stadium, Sydney
Attendance: 23,818
Referee: Strebre Delovski

Melbourne Victory won 4–3 on aggregate.

==== Minor semi-final ====
7 March 2010
16:00 UTC+13

Wellington Phoenix	3–1 (a.e.t.)	Newcastle Jets
T. Brown 33'; Ifill 105+1'; Dadi 115'	Report; Summary	M. Thompson 20'

Westpac Stadium, Wellington
Attendance: 32,792
Referee: Chris Beath

=== Preliminary final ===
13 March 2010
20:30 UTC+11

Sydney FC	4–2	Wellington Phoenix
Payne 21', 31'; Brosque 63'; Bridge 71'	Report; Summary	Durante 27'; Dadi 81'

Sydney Football Stadium, Sydney
Attendance: 13,196
Referee: Peter Green

=== Grand Final ===
20 March 2010
19:00 UTC+11

Melbourne Victory	1–1 (a.e.t.)	Sydney FC
Leijer 81'	Report; Summary	Bridge 63'
Penalties
Muscat (penalty missed); Brebner (penalty scored); Angulo (penalty missed); Broxham (penalty scored)	2–4	(penalty scored) Colosimo; (penalty missed) Cole; (penalty scored) Foxe; (penalty scored) Kisel; (penalty scored) Byun

Etihad Stadium, Melbourne
Attendance: 48,560
Referee: Strebre Delovski

== Season statistics ==
=== Top scorers ===
Rank	Player	Club	Goals
1	(New Zealand) Shane Smeltz	Gold Coast United	19
2	(Indonesia) Sergio van Dijk	Brisbane Roar	13
3	(Costa Rica) Carlos Hernández	Melbourne Victory	12
3	(Barbados) Paul Ifill	Wellington Phoenix	12
5	(Australia) Archie Thompson	Melbourne Victory	10
6	(Australia) John Aloisi	Sydney FC	9
6	(England) Robbie Fowler	North Queensland Fury	9
8	(Australia) Daniel McBreen	Perth Glory	8
9	(New Zealand) Tim Brown	Wellington Phoenix	7
9	(Australia) Steve Corica	Sydney FC	7
9	(Australia) Matt Thompson	Newcastle Jets	7

=== Attendance ===
These are the attendance records of each of the teams at the end of the home and away season. The table does not include finals series attendances.

Team	Hosted	Average	High	Low	Total
Melbourne Victory	14	20,750	30,668	15,168	290,503
Sydney FC	14	12,987	25,407	8,359	181,816
Adelaide United	14	10,765	15,038	8,244	150,705
Perth Glory	13	9,205	12,822	7,217	119,670
Wellington Phoenix	13	8,965	19,258	4,115	116,549
Brisbane Roar	14	8,650	19,902	5,801	121,099
Central Coast Mariners	13	7,430	11,137	5,193	96,588
North Queensland Fury	13	6,723	8,897	4,156	87,396
Newcastle Jets	13	6,358	9,892	4,329	82,656
Gold Coast United	14	5,392	10,024	2,616	75,493
League total	135	9,796	30,668	2,616	1,322,475

==== Top 10 Attendances ====
Attendance	Round	Date	Home	Score	Away	Venue	Weekday	Time of Day
44,560	Grand Final	20 March 2010	Melbourne Victory	1–1	Sydney FC	Etihad Stadium	Saturday	Evening
32,792	Finals; Wk 2	7 March 2010	Wellington Phoenix	3–1	Newcastle Jets	Westpac Stadium	Sunday	Afternoon
30,668	10	9 October 2009	Melbourne Victory	0–3	Sydney FC	Etihad Stadium	Friday	Night
27,344	20	19 December 2009	Melbourne Victory	0–0	Sydney FC	Etihad Stadium	Saturday	Evening
25,407	27	14 February 2010	Sydney FC	2–0	Melbourne Victory	Sydney Football Stadium	Sunday	Evening
24,278	Finals; Wk 1	21 February 2010	Wellington Phoenix	1–1	Perth Glory	Westpac Stadium	Sunday	Evening
23,818	Final; Wk 2	7 March 2010	Sydney FC	2–2	Melbourne Victory	Sydney Football Stadium	Sunday	Evening
22,726	26	5 February 2010	Melbourne Victory	2–0	North Queensland Fury	Etihad Stadium	Friday	Night
21,182	12	24 October 2009	Melbourne Victory	3–1	Adelaide United	Etihad Stadium	Saturday	Evening
20,537	16	28 November 2009	Melbourne Victory	4–0	Gold Coast United	Etihad Stadium	Saturday	Evening

=== Discipline ===
The Fair Play Award will go to the team with the lowest points on the fair play ladder at the conclusion of the home and away season. It was awarded to Premiers Sydney FC who scraped in by 4 points from rivals Melbourne Victory.

1 point	Yellow Card
2 points	Second Caution Red Card
3 points	Direct Red Card

Team	Yellow card	Yellow card Yellow card Red card	Red card	Points
Sydney FC	38	0	1	41
Melbourne Victory	40	1	1	45
North Queensland Fury	41	2	0	45
Adelaide United	43	1	1	48
Central Coast Mariners	42	2	0	46
Newcastle Jets	43	1	0	45
Perth Glory	50	1	0	52
Gold Coast United	48	1	2	56
Wellington Phoenix	54	0	1	57
Brisbane Roar	54	2	1	61
Totals	453	11	7	

* The Newcastle Jets' Tarek Elrich received a direct red card in their round 7 fixture against Sydney FC. However, this was successfully appealed by the club and expunged from Elrich and the team's records.
* Adelaide United's Iain Fyfe received a direct red card in their round 19 fixture against Perth Glory. However, this was overruled by the match review panel and expunged from Fyfe and the team's records.

== See also ==
- 2009 Australian football code crowds

=== Team season articles ===
- 2009–10 Adelaide United FC season
- 2009–10 Brisbane Roar FC season
- 2009–10 Central Coast Mariners FC season
- 2009–10 Gold Coast United FC season
- 2009–10 Melbourne Victory FC season
- 2009–10 Newcastle Jets FC season
- 2009–10 North Queensland Fury FC season
- 2009–10 Perth Glory FC season
- 2009–10 Sydney FC season
- 2009–10 Wellington Phoenix FC season
