= Eugène Dadi =

Ivorian footballer (born 1973)

Personal information
- Full name: Eugène Buhame Dadi
- Date of birth: 20 August 1973 (age 53)
- Place of birth: Abidjan, Ivory Coast
- Height: 1.88 m (6 ft 2 in)
- Position: Striker

Youth career
- 1987-1988: Paris UC
- 1988-1992: Sochaux

Senior career*
Years	Team	Apps	(Gls)
1993–1995	Laval	22	(3)
1995–1996	Sète 34	17	(2)
1996–2000	LASK	52	(10)
2000–2001	Toulouse	3	(0)
2001–2002	Aberdeen	33	(5)
2002–2003	Livingston	25	(3)
2003–2005	Tranmere Rovers	86	(28)
2005	Nottingham Forest	6	(0)
2006	→ Notts County (loan)	11	(2)
2006–2008	Hapoel Acre	3	(0)
2008–2010	Perth Glory	22	(10)
2009	→ Vaduz (loan)	8	(1)
2010	Wellington Phoenix	10	(5)
2010–2011	Persibo Bojonegoro	18	(3)
2011–2012	Manado United	11	(2)
Total		305	(71)

International career
2000	Ivory Coast	2	(0)
- * Club domestic league appearances and goals

Eugène Dadi (born 20 August 1973) is an Ivorian retired professional footballer who played as a striker for clubs in Switzerland, France, Austria, Scotland, England, Israel, Australia, and New Zealand. At international level, he represented Ivory Coast on two occasions in 2000.

== Career ==
=== Sochaux ===
Born in Abidjan, Ivory Coast, Dadi attended the football academy at French Division 1 team FC Sochaux as a teenager.

=== Stade Lavallois ===
Dadi played until 1992 when his father died. At this point he decided to quit professional football for two years. Dadi played his first professional football at French Ligue 2 team Stade Lavallois in 1994.

=== LASK ===
After being spotted playing park football on the Indian Ocean island of Réunion, where he had a job working in real estate, Dadi was signed to Austrian club LASK.

=== Aberdeen ===
Dadi spent one season at Aberdeen that in terms of scoring goals was not great. However, he was a firm fans' favourite and had become somewhat of a cult hero with Aberdeen fans. This was due to his last name, which inspired the popular terrace chant of "Who's your, who's your, who's your feckin Dadi?."

=== Tranmere Rovers ===
Dadi had two seasons on the Wirral with Tranmere Rovers. He played up front and scored 28 goals. In his first season in 2002–03 he finished the club's top scorer, scoring goals against Notts County and Chesterfield. He also scored the first goal against Bolton Wanderers in the FA Cup third round replay at the Reebok Stadium, a game which Tranmere Rovers won 2–1. In his second season, he helped Rovers finish in the play-offs and was a regular up front with Iain Hume. He was known for wearing his hair in a "pineapple" shape. He left the club in the summer and joined Nottingham Forest.

=== Perth Glory ===
Dadi trialled with Perth in November 2007, but was denied an opportunity to join Perth Glory, when his previous club Hapoel Acre failed to release him during the transfer window. He took part in the Glory's post-season tour of China and impressed coaching staff enough to offer him a permanent contract with the club. Dadi's first A-League goal with the club came in the second match of the 2008–09 A-League season, against Newcastle United Jets at Members Equity Stadium in Perth. Dadi rose to meet a cross from team mate Amaral, putting the header past goalkeeper Ante Covic. His next two goals were against Sydney FC, where Perth were defeated by 5–2.

Dadi scored a late winner to beat Wellington Phoenix 1–0 and a late penalty which he had to retake to equalise against Newcastle Jets to keep the Glory within touch of the A-League top four. On 6 December, Dadi scored two goals in four minutes in Perth Glory's 3–1 win over Melbourne Victory. In Glory's match against the Victory in January, Dadi again scored twice to lead Glory to a 3–2 victory. He re-signed with the club until the end of the 2009–10 season, however, he missed the last two games of Perth's 2008–09 season to begin a five-month loan at Swiss Super League side FC Vaduz.

=== Wellington Phoenix ===
Dadi left Perth Glory due to lack of game time, and signed with the Wellington Phoenix. He made his debut on 9 January against the Brisbane Roar where he scored two goals, including a spectacular bicycle kick which earned him the Phone-Nix Player of the Day. His bicycle kick goal was nominated for A-League Goal of the Year for that season. Dadi scored again a week later against North Queensland Fury, when he headed in from a Leo Bertos corner. Dadi was forced off the field after he and Matt Smith clashed heads. Dadi required 15 stitches for his wound. Dadi's return to Perth Glory was not a good one for the striker as the Phoenix lost 2–0. Dadi picked up an early yellow card for dissent and nearly got himself sent off after a lunge at Jacob Burns. Dadi was given the chance to reduce the deficit in the 73rd minute after Troy Hearfield won a penalty, but he shot the ball straight into Glory goalkeeper Tando Velaphi. Dadi scored the third goal in Wellington's extra-time 3–1 victory over Newcastle Jets in the 2009–10 Minor Semi-final second leg.

=== Manado United ===
Dadi left Persibo Bojonegoro due to undergoing a player exchange with Amir Amadeh of Persibo Bojonegoro to Manado United on Liga Primer Indonesia side.

== Personal life ==
Eugène owns his own fashion label and can speak three languages fluently – English, French, and German. He spent a year in Austria as an actor. Dadi took two years off football after the death of his father in the early 1990s.

== Honours ==
Individual

- Perth Glory Member's Player of the Year: 2008–2009
