= Todd Howarth =

Australian soccer player (born 1982)

Personal information
- Full name: Todd Howarth
- Date of birth: 25 January 1982 (age 44)
- Place of birth: Perth, Western Australia
- Height: 1.85 m (6 ft 1 in)
- Position: Midfielder

Team information
- Current team: Fremantle City

Senior career*
Years	Team	Apps	(Gls)
2000–2009	Perth SC	208	(36)
2009–2012	Perth Glory	82	(5)
2012	Persib Bandung		
2013–2020	Bayswater City	142	(24)
2021–	Fremantle City	32	(4)
- * Club domestic league appearances and goals as of 19 September 2022

Todd Howarth (born 25 January 1982) is an Australian footballer. He currently plays for Fremantle City.

== Club career ==
=== Early career ===
Howarth started his career at Football West Premier League outfit Perth SC.

=== Perth Glory ===
On 7 August 2009, he was signed to his first professional contract by Perth Glory after having trialled for a few weeks. On the same day he made his debut for Perth Glory as a substitute, in a 1–0 defeat to Adelaide United. On 27 April 2012, Howarth was released by Perth Glory.

=== Persib Bandung ===
In November 2012, Howarth nearly joined the Indonesia Super League club Persib Bandung, but after a very tough contract negotiations Persib decided to stop negotiating with him.

== A-League career statistics ==
(Correct as of 28 April 2012)

Club	Season	League			Finals			Asia			Total		
Club	Season	Apps	Goals	Assists	Apps	Goals	Assists	Apps	Goals	Assists	Apps	Goals	Assists
Perth Glory	2009–10	25	2	1	1	0	0	-	-	-	26	2	1
Perth Glory	2010–11	28	2	2	-	-	-	-	-	-	28	2	2
Perth Glory	2011–12	24	0	1	4	1	0	-	-	-	28	1	1
Total		77	4	4	5	1	0	-	-	-	82	5	4
