= Tando Velaphi =

Australian soccer player (born 1987)

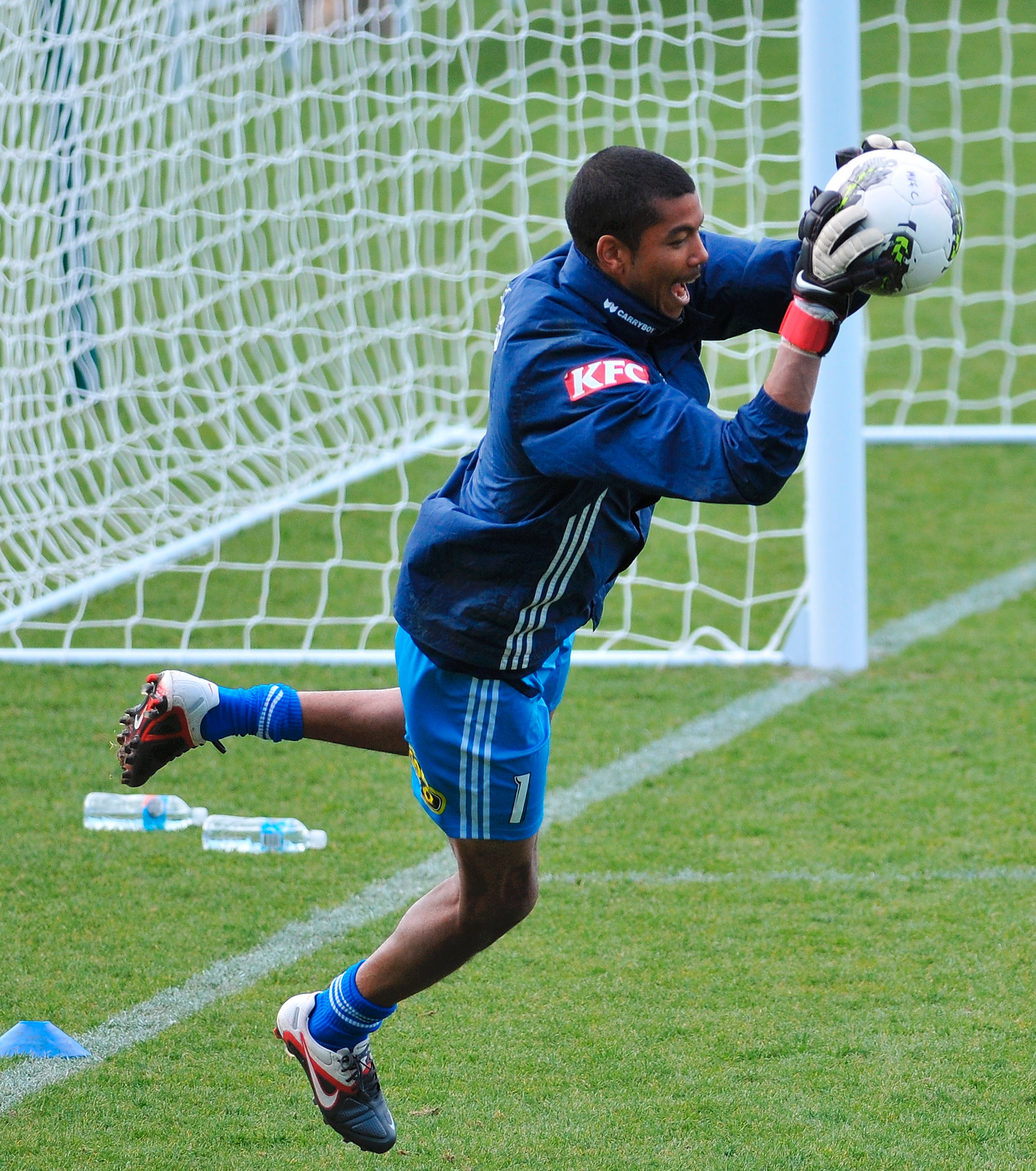
- Velaphi training with Melbourne Victory in 2011

Personal information
- Full name: Tando Yuji Velaphi
- Date of birth: 17 April 1987 (age 39)
- Place of birth: Perth, Western Australia
- Height: 1.86 m (6 ft 1 in)
- Position: Goalkeeper

Youth career
- Perth SC
- 2004–2006: AIS

Senior career*
Years	Team	Apps	(Gls)
2006–2007	Perth SC	12	(0)
2007	→ Queensland Roar (loan)	1	(0)
2007–2011	Perth Glory	74	(0)
2011–2013	Melbourne Victory	3	(0)
2013–2016	Melbourne City	22	(0)
2016–2017	Shonan Bellmare	5	(0)
2018	Wellington Phoenix Reserves	1	(0)
2018	Wellington Phoenix	4	(0)
2018–2021	Perth Glory	7	(0)
2022–2024	Kochi United	36	(0)

International career
2006	Australia U20	6	(0)
2007	Australia U23	7	(0)
- * Club domestic league appearances and goals

Tando Yuji Velaphi (born 17 April 1987) is an Australian professional football player who played as a goalkeeper for Subiaco AFC.

== Club career ==
=== Early playing career ===
Velaphi trained at the AIS in Canberra on a football scholarship.

=== Perth SC (2006–2007) ===
Velaphi began his senior career at Perth SC and while there, had loan stints at Newcastle Jets and Queensland Roar.

==== Loan to Queensland Roar ====
Velaphi made his A-League debut with Queensland Roar on 12 January 2007 in a 2–1 win over Melbourne Victory at Docklands Stadium, his performance in the match earning praise from then-Queensland coach Frank Farina.

=== Perth Glory (2007–2011) ===
Velaphi was re-signed for Perth Glory as their youth marquee player, keeping him at the club until the end of the 2010–11 season. The 2009–10 season was Velaphi's best, solidifying his spot between the posts and keeping 9 clean sheets over the course of the campaign.

=== Melbourne Victory (2011–2013) ===
On 8 February 2011, Melbourne Victory announced that they had signed Velaphi on a two-year deal from Perth Glory on a free transfer. He made his début for the Victory in the 2011 AFC Champions League on 5 April, in a 1–1 draw against Tianjin Teda. He managed to play 4 out of the Victory's 6 Asian Champions League games. Unfortunately for Tando, he suffered an injury in the pre-season, just after the AFC Champions League, causing him to sit out for the vast majority of the season. He made his official A-League debut for the Victory in Round 26, the penultimate round of the season against the Wellington Phoenix at AAMI Park, a match in which the Victory won 3–0. He appeared in the following round against Perth Glory at Nib Stadium, but the Victory slumped to a 4–2 defeat.

Velaphi made his first appearance of the 2012–13 A-League season in the Victory's Round 3 match against Adelaide United, a match which the Victory won 2–1. He was then replaced in the starting lineup by Nathan Coe, and failed to make another appearance in the season.

Velaphi, along with teammates Diogo Ferreira, Spase Dilevski and Sam Gallagher, was released by Melbourne Victory in April 2013, shortly after the end of the 2012–13 A-League season. In his three years at the club, Velaphi made just 3 out of a possible 56 appearances for the club.

=== Melbourne Heart / City (2013–2016) ===
Following his release from the Victory, he joined cross town rivals Melbourne Heart on a one-year deal. He managed to play the last three matches of the 2013/14 season. Velaphi has also signed on for another 1-year deal with the Melbourne Heart after much discussion.

After a successful 2014/15 season where he became Melbourne City's first-choice goalkeeper, Velaphi signed a new contract keeping him at City until the end of the 2016/17 A-League season.

He was released during the January transfer window of the 2015–16 A-League season to pursue opportunity overseas.

=== Wellington Phoenix (2018) ===
After limited appearances at Shonan Bellmare, Velaphi returned to the A-League, signing a deal with Wellington Phoenix until the end of the 2017-2018 season. On his debut he saved a penalty from Diego Castro.

=== Return to Perth Glory (2018–2021) ===
In July 2018, Velaphi re-joined Perth Glory on a one-year contract, expected to create competition with Liam Reddy and Nick Feely for the number one goalkeeper position. Velaphi was released from the Glory at the end of the 2019–20 A-League.

Two months later he returned to Perth having signed a 1-year contract on 10 November 2020, the same day the side released Daniel Margush to move to the Western Sydney Wanderers FC.

=== Return to Japan and Joined to Kochi United SC (2022–2024) ===
After spending three years at Perth, he confirmed his departure from Australian football on 11 February 2022, as he was officially announced as a new signing of Kochi United SC. It marked his return to Japan after six years spent playing overseas. On 9 February 2024, Velaphi announced his retirement from professional football.

== International career ==
Velaphi played for the Young Socceroos, playing in the 2006 AFC Youth Championship and is currently a member of the Olyroos. Due to the withdrawal of first-choice Olyroos goalkeeper Danny Vukovic through suspension, Velaphi was competing with Reading back-up keeper, Adam Federici to become the Olyroos' starting goalkeeper at the Beijing Olympics, but made no appearances for the Olyroos.

Tando revealed in January 2010 that his long-term ambition was to leave Australia and play regular football in Europe, in the hopes of securing a place on Australia's 2014 World Cup roster.

== Personal life ==
Velaphi was born in Perth, Western Australia. His mother is Japanese and his father is Zimbabwean. Velaphi is currently studying in Bachelor of Business (Sport Management) at Deakin University.

== A-League career statistics ==
As of 16 September 2014

CS = Clean Sheets

Club	Season	League		Finals		Cup		Asia^{1}		Total	
Club	Season	Apps	CS	Apps	CS	Apps	CS	Apps	CS	Apps	CS
Queensland Roar	2006–07	1	0	0	0	0	0	—		1	0
Queensland Roar	Total	1	0	0	0	0	0	0	0	1	0
Perth Glory	2007–08	8	1	—		4	1	—		12	2
Perth Glory	2008–09	13	1	—		0	0	—		13	1
Perth Glory	2009–10	24	9	1	0	—		—		25	9
Perth Glory	2010–11	28	4	—		—		—		28	4
Perth Glory	Total	73	15	1	0	4	1	0	0	78	16
Melbourne Victory	2010–11	0	0	0	0	—		4	0	4	0
Melbourne Victory	2011–12	2	1	—		—		—		2	1
Melbourne Victory	2012–13	1	0	0	0	—		—		1	0
Melbourne Victory	Total	3	1	0	0	0	0	4	0	7	1
Melbourne City	2013–14	0	0	—		—		—		0	0
Melbourne City	2014–15	0	0	—		3	0	—		0	3
Melbourne City	Total	0	0	0	0	0	0	0	0	0	0
A-League total		77	16	1	0	4	1	4	0	86	17

^{1} - AFC Champions League statistics are included in season ending during group stages (i.e. ACL 2011 and A-League season 2010–11 etc.)

== Japan career statistics ==
As of the start from 2023 season.

Appearances and goals by club, season and competition
Club	Season	League			National Cup		League Cup		Total	
Club	Season	Division	Apps	Goals	Apps	Goals	Apps	Goals	Apps	Goals
Japan			League		Emperor's Cup		J. League Cup		Total	
Shonan Bellmare	2016	J1 League	5	0	1	0	3	0	9	0
Shonan Bellmare	2017	J2 League	0	0	0	0	0	0	0	0
Shonan Bellmare	Total		5	0	1	0	3	0	9	0
Kochi United SC	2022	Japan Football League	30	0	2	0	0	0	32	0
Kochi United SC	2023	Japan Football League	0	0	0	0	0	0	0	0
Kochi United SC	Total		30	0	2	0	0	0	32	0
Career total			35	0	3	0	3	0	41	0

== Honours ==
Shonan Bellmare

- J2 League: 2017

Perth Glory

- A-League: Premiers 2018–19
