= Victor Sikora =

Dutch footballer (born 1978)

Personal information
- Full name: Victor Tadeusz Sikora
- Date of birth: 11 April 1978 (age 48)
- Place of birth: Deventer, Netherlands
- Height: 1.73 m (5 ft 8 in)
- Position: Midfielder

Youth career
- RODA
- Go Ahead Eagles

Senior career*
Years	Team	Apps	(Gls)
1994–1999	Go Ahead Eagles	107	(34)
1999–2002	Vitesse	84	(20)
2002–2008	Ajax	44	(7)
2004–2005	→ Heerenveen (loan)	19	(1)
2005	→ NAC Breda (loan)	13	(0)
2006–2008	NAC Breda	30	(3)
2008–2009	FC Dallas	5	(1)
2008–2009	→ Perth Glory (loan)	5	(0)
2009–2012	Perth Glory	18	(4)
Total		325	(70)

International career
2001–2002	Netherlands	6	(0)
- * Club domestic league appearances and goals

Victor Tadeusz Sikora (born 11 April 1978) is a Dutch former professional footballer who played as a midfielder.

Sikora began his career at the Go Ahead Eagles youth academy and worked his way into the first team, debuting as a 16-year-old. He quickly grew out to become a prolific scorer from midfield, prompting a move to Vitesse in 1999 before being signed by Dutch giants Ajax in 2002, where he appeared in the UEFA Champions League group stage together with players such as Zlatan Ibrahimović, Rafael van der Vaart and Wesley Sneijder. Following successive injuries and loans to SC Heerenveen and NAC Breda, he signed a permanent deal with the latter in 2006. In the later stages of his career, Sikora had brief spells playing in the United States and Australia before announcing his retirement in 2012.

Sikora earned six caps for the Netherlands between 2001 and 2002.

== Club career ==
=== Go Ahead Eagles ===
Born in Deventer, Overijssel, Sikora began his youth career with lower-tier club Roda Deventer, before moving to regional professional club Go Ahead Eagles as a youth. At that club, also based in Deventer, he played for various youth teams until the 1994–95 season, where he was promoted to the first team, who competed in the highest division in Dutch football, the Eredivisie. In the same season, at age 16, Sikora made his professional debut when he came on as a substitute for Gijs Steinmann in the 69th minute of the 2–1 away defeat to RKC Waalwijk on 15 February 1995. After a mixed season, in which Go Ahead Eagles only managed to finish in the penultimate spot in the league table, the team was able to secure another year in the highest tier by winning the relegation play-offs at the end of the season.

After avoiding relegation, Sikora was included more often in the first-team squad during the 1995–96 season and finished the season with 14 league appearances, in which he also scored his first professional league goal. As in the previous season, Go Ahead Eagles struggled, and with 22 points in 34 games the team finished in last place of the table thereby suffered relegation to the second-tier Eerste Divisie. There, Sikora grew out to become a first-team regular, and by the end of the 1996–97 season, he had made 32 appearances, in which he scored eight goals. Apart from club topscorer Erik Tammer (23 goals), he was the top goalscorer of his team. Although the Eagles took part in the promotion play-offs, the club did not manage promotion back to the Eredivisie due to a lower goal differential.

The club suffered some setbacks in the following season. After 34 games played, the team only achieved a mid-table finish and remained in the Eerste Divisie. Sikora appeared in 31 matches and alongside players such as Tammer (17 goals) and Jan Michels (12 goals), he was one of the team's top goalscorers again with twelve goals. After another, for him personally, very strong 1998–99 season, in which he scored 13 goals in 29 league appearances games – but again failed to make promotion play-offs with the team, interest among Eredivisie clubs arose for Sikora, who was mostly utilised as a striker. His biggest achievement during the season was reaching the round of 16 of the 1998–99 KNVB Cup, where the team was subsequently knocked out to PEC Zwolle after a 2–5 loss. In the years before, Sikora and the team had mostly suffered elimination from the tournament from the current competition shortly after first knockout round.

=== Vitesse ===
Sikora, who in his final season with Go Ahead Eagles with his 13 goals ranked second on the team in goalscoring behind Bram Marbus (14 goals), was signed by the Dutch Eredivisie club Vitesse. At the Arnhem based club, Sikora quickly established himself in midfield and his first season with the club he appeared in 28 league games in which he scored eight goals. Vitesse finished fourth in the league table thus qualified for the UEFA Cup in his first season. In the 1999–2000 season, Sikora had already made his first European appearance, which he followed up in the following season by playing two matches in the 2000–01 UEFA Cup.

In the league, Sikora's 2000–01 season was similar to the previous season as he made 27 Eredivisie appearances, in which he scored nine goals. However, Vitesse missed out on European qualification on goal differential, finishing sixth in the league. In the KNVB Cup, the team also missed out during these seasons, being knocked out in the semi-finals in both the 1999–2000 and 2000–01 editions of the KNVB Cup. In the 2001–02 season, in which he again finished in European spots with Vitesse, Sikora made three goals in 29 appearances.

=== Ajax ===
Despite a low goal average in his final season at Vitesse, defending Dutch champions Ajax expressed their interest in him and he finally joined the club on a € 4.5 million deal. Besides Ajax, there was also interest from English club Fulham. In his first season at the club, he was unable to establish himself as a first-team regular, also and struggled with injuries. He made 17 league appearances in which he scored twice as Ajax lifted the 2002 Johan Cruyff Shield that year, as they finished runners-up in the league and stranded in the semi-finals of the KNVB Cup against Feyenoord. In addition, Sikora gained his first experience in the UEFA Champions League, where he made four appearances, including in matches against Lyon, Inter Milan and Roma, and made it to the quarter-finals of the competition, where, however, they were defeated by the eventual winners Milan after a 2–3 loss on aggregate. In the Eredivisie, Ajax finished second in the league table, one point behind rivals PSV, which meant that they qualified for the third qualifying round for the 2003–04 Champions League.

After narrowly advancing from the third round, after a 2–3 win on aggregate over Grazer AK, Ajax were knocked out in the subsequent group stage, finishing in last place of Group H. Sikora, who played in both qualifiers against Grazer AK and in two of Ajax' six group matches in the Champions League, emerged as a regular starter in midfield in the Eredivisie after the team were knocked out of European contention. Sikora, who was mostly used in defensive midfield, made a total of 27 league appearances and five goals and was thus instrumental in Ajax securing their 29th title in club history.

In his time at Ajax, Sikora scored seven league goals, won two league titles (2002, 2004), a Johan Cruyff Shield and KNVB Cup titles in 2002. Sikora also participated in the UEFA Champions League with Ajax.

==== Loans to Heerenveen and NAC ====
Despite achieving successes with Ajax, the club's management decided that Sikora was to be loaned out in order for him to gain more regular playing time. His first loan was at SC Heerenveen, who signed him to a one-year loan deal. For Heerenveen, he only made 19 appearances and one goal in the 2004–05 season. After finishing fifth in the league table and returning to Ajax, Sikora was sent on a season-long loan to NAC Breda. Both club and player struggled for form during the 2005–06 season, as he only made 13 league appearances, in which he remained goalless, as NAC finished 16th and only managed to avoid relegation following play-offs. Even though Sikora failed to establish himself as a regular starter during his loan at NAC, he was signed on a permanent deal following the season.

=== NAC Breda ===
Plagued by injuries, Sikora struggled to make the starting lineup following his permanent move to NAC Breda and only made nine Eredivisie appearances during the 2006–07 season, in which he scored one goal. In addition, the club fought a relegation battle, and once again the team had to avoid relegation through the play-offs. They were, however, successful there and remained a top-tier side. In the following season, Sikora made 21 league appearances and scored two goals, but was still unable to match his performances of earlier years and decided to leave NAC as his contract expired.

=== FC Dallas ===
Soon after leaving NAC, Sikora moved to the United States, where he signed a lucrative contract with Major League Soccer (MLS) side FC Dallas with a base salary of US$144,000 and a guaranteed severance pay of just over US$163,000. He was, however, injured after only two league games and out for several weeks after a meniscus tear in his right knee. He made a return after one month, but failed to establish himself as first-team regular and towards the end of the season he appeared during three league games, in which he was unable to make the final whistle and had to be substituted early on. However, in the final game of the season, a 2–2 away draw against LA Galaxy, Sikora scored an important goal after an assist provided by Mexico international Duilio Davino.

==== Loan to Perth Glory ====
After a trial at his former club, Go Ahead Eagles, Sikora joined Australian club Perth Glory on loan during the winter break before the new season. There he was supposed to replace Brazilian midfielder Amaral, who was sidelined due to injury. In his first season, Sikora was utilised in five league games, in which he scored no goals.

=== Perth Glory ===
After only two months on loan, Sikora signed a one-year permanent deal in February 2009 with Perth Glory. Before that, he had already been in contact with his former club, Go Ahead Eagles, where he also completed trials, but ultimately failed to secure a contract. After his return to Australia, Sikora quickly became a regular on the club's professional team. He made 17 A-League appearances before December 2009 in which he scored four goals. After that, however, he suffered injury setbacks that prevented him from being used competitively for Perth Glory. A multitude of different injuries caused the setbacks, including strains and thigh injuries, but also hip problems that ruled the midfielder out for several weeks. In addition, there were injuries to the knee, for which Sikora had already had surgery in June 2009.

After he had only made one appearance in the 2010–11 and 2011–12 seasons, Sikora announced his retirement from professional football in mid-2012.

== International career ==
Sikora has earned six caps with the Netherlands, with his first appearance coming in a February 2001 friendly against Turkey, and the last in 2002 against the United States.

== Career statistics ==
=== Club ===
Appearances and goals by club, season and competition
Club	Season	League			Cup		Continental		Other		Total	
Club	Season	Division	Apps	Goals	Apps	Goals	Apps	Goals	Apps	Goals	Apps	Goals
Go Ahead Eagles	1994–95	Eredivisie	1	0	0	0	—		—		1	0
Go Ahead Eagles	1995–96	Eredivisie	14	1	0	0	—		—		14	1
Go Ahead Eagles	1996–97	Eerste Divisie	32	8	0	0	—		—		32	8
Go Ahead Eagles	1997–98	Eerste Divisie	31	12	0	0	—		—		31	12
Go Ahead Eagles	1998–99	Eerste Divisie	29	13	2	2	—		—		31	15
Go Ahead Eagles	Total		107	34	2	2	—		—		109	36
Vitesse	1999–2000	Eredivisie	28	8	1	0	3 (Note: All appearance(s) in UEFA Cup)	0	—		32	8
Vitesse	2000–01	Eredivisie	27	9	3	1	4	0	—		34	10
Vitesse	2001–02	Eredivisie	29	3	0	0	—		—		29	3
Vitesse	Total		84	20	4	1	7	0	—		95	21
Ajax	2002–03	Eredivisie	17	2	0	0	4 (Note: All appearance(s) in UEFA Champions League)	0	1 (Note: All appearance(s) in Johan Cruyff Shield)	0	22	2
Ajax	2003–04	Eredivisie	27	5	1	0	4	0	—		32	5
Ajax	Total		44	7	1	0	8	0	1	0	54	7
Heerenveen (loan)	2004–05	Eredivisie	19	1	0	0	7	1	—		26	2
NAC Breda (loan)	2005–06	Eredivisie	13	0	0	0	—		—		13	0
NAC Breda	2006–07	Eredivisie	9	1	0	0	—		—		9	1
NAC Breda	2007–08	Eredivisie	21	2	1	0	—		2 (Note: All appearance(s) in Eredivisie play-offs)	0	24	2
NAC Breda	Total		43	3	1	0	—		2	0	46	3
FC Dallas	2008	Major League Soccer	5	1	0	0	—		—		5	1
Perth Glory (loan)	2008–09	A-League	5	0	0	0	—		—		5	0
Perth Glory	2009–10	A-League	17	4	0	0	—		—		17	4
Perth Glory	2010–11	A-League	1	0	0	0	—		—		1	0
Perth Glory	2011–12	A-League	0	0	0	0	—		—		0	0
Perth Glory	Total		23	4	0	0	—		—		23	4
Career total			325	70	8	3	22	1	3	0	358	74

=== International ===
Appearances and goals by national team and year
National team	Year	Apps	Goals
Netherlands	2001	3	0
Netherlands	2002	3	0
Total		6	0

== Honours ==
Ajax

- Eredivisie: 2003–04
- Johan Cruyff Shield: 2002
