= Branko Jelić =

Serbian footballer

Branko Jelić Бранко Јелић
Personal information
- Full name: Branko Jelić
- Date of birth: 5 May 1977 (age 49)
- Place of birth: Čačak, SFR Yugoslavia
- Height: 1.83 m (6 ft 0 in)
- Position: Striker

Senior career*
Years	Team	Apps	(Gls)
1995–2000	Borac Čačak	58	(19)
2000–2003	Red Star Belgrade	68	(22)
2003	Vojvodina	21	(6)
2004–2005	Beijing Guoan	48	(30)
2006–2007	Xiamen Lanshi	24	(7)
2008–2009	Energie Cottbus	36	(6)
2009–2011	Perth Glory	33	(7)
Total		288	(97)

International career
1999	FR Yugoslavia U21	2	(4)
- * Club domestic league appearances and goals

Branko Jelić (Serbian Cyrillic: Бранко Јелић, pronounced [brâːŋko jěːlitɕ]; born 5 May 1977) is a Serbian former professional footballer who played as a striker.

== Biography ==
=== Club career ===
Jelić was born in Čačak, Serbia. He started his playing career with Borac Čačak before joining Serbian Red Star Belgrade and then FK Vojvodina. He won the Golden Boot Award after scoring 21 goals in the 2005 Chinese Super League season for Beijing Guoan. Branko Jelić scored twice in a 2–0 win for FC Energie Cottbus against Bayern Munich on 15 March 2008.

At the national team level, Jelic played for FR Yugoslavia U21 in 1999.

Jelić joined Australian A-League side Perth Glory for the 2009/10 season. He signed in May 2010 following the mutual termination of his contract with his Bundesliga club, agreeing a three-year contract with Jelić. In June 2011, he was released from the final year of his contract, having played 33 times for the Glory.

== A-League career statistics ==
As of 21 March 2011

Club	Season	League		Finals		Asia		Total	
Club	Season	Apps	Goals	Apps	Goals	Apps	Goals	Apps	Goals
Perth Glory	2009–10	18	5	-	-	-	-	18	5
Perth Glory	2010–11	15	2	-	-	-	-	15	2
Total		33	7	-	-	-	-	33	7

== Honours ==
Individual

- Chinese Super League Top Scorer: 2004–2005 with Beijing Guoan – 21 goals
