= Jeff Bright =

Australian footballer (born 1985)

Personal information
- Full name: Jeffrey Bright
- Date of birth: 7 May 1985 (age 41)
- Place of birth: Sale, Victoria, Australia
- Height: 1.75 m (5 ft 9 in)
- Position: Left back

Team information
- Current team: Cockburn City
2008	→ Perth Glory	8	(0)
2010	Dandenong Thunder	16	(0)
2005–2021	Mandurah City	275	
2022–	Cockburn City	20	(0)

Jeff Bright (born 7 May 1985) is an Australian footballer who currently plays for Cockburn City. Jeff spent 2010 at Dandenong Thunder in the VPL. He played 8 games for Perth Glory in the Hyundai A-League.
