= Marc Anthony (footballer) =

Scottish footballer

Personal information
- Full name: Marc Anthony
- Date of birth: 28 March 1978 (age 48)
- Place of birth: Edinburgh, Scotland
- Position: Central midfielder

Youth career
- 1995–1996: Celtic

Senior career*
Years	Team	Apps	(Gls)
1996–1999	Celtic	1	(0)
1997–1998	→ Tranmere Rovers (loan)	0	(0)
1998–1999	→ Clydebank (loan)	13	(1)
1999–2002	Berwick Rangers	89	(20)
2002–2004	Forfar Athletic	25	(1)
2007	ECU Joondalup		
2008	Stirling Lions		
2008–2009	→ Perth Glory (loan)	6	(0)
2010–2011	Cockburn City		

International career
1996–1997	Scotland U21	3	(0)
- * Club domestic league appearances and goals as of 18:44, 8 December 2008 (UTC)

Marc Anthony (born 28 March 1978) is a Scottish former footballer.

== Career ==
Anthony began his career with three appearances for Celtic, before playing for Scottish lower league clubs Forfar and Berwick. In 2007, he moved to Australia where he first played for Football West State League team ECU Joondalup before joining the Stirling Lions. In November 2008 he joined A-League outfit Perth Glory. In 2010, he joined Cockburn City and won the WA State League player of the year for the 2010 season.

Anthony appeared in a Season 5 episode of the U.S. TV series The Office. As described by reddit user kiasam111, new boss Charles (Idris Elba) walks out of his office to find Andy (Ed Helms) looking at what appears to be a screen-saver with a series of photos of football. A photo appears of two players, taken from an A-League (soccer) game between Central Coast Mariners and Perth Glory, played at Central Coast Stadium in Gosford, Australia, on 31 December 2008. The players in the photo (taken by Corey Davis of Getty Images) are Anthony (Perth) and Matthew Osman (Central Coast).

=== A-League statistics ===
(Accurate as of 25 November 2008)

Club	Season	League			Finals			Asia			Total		
Club	Season	Apps	Goals	Assists	Apps	Goals	Assists	Apps	Goals	Assists	Apps	Goals	Assists
Perth Glory	2008–09	2	0	0	-	-	-	-	-	-	2	0	0
Total		2	0	0	-	-	-	-	-	-	2	0	0
