= Andrija Jukic =

Australian soccer player

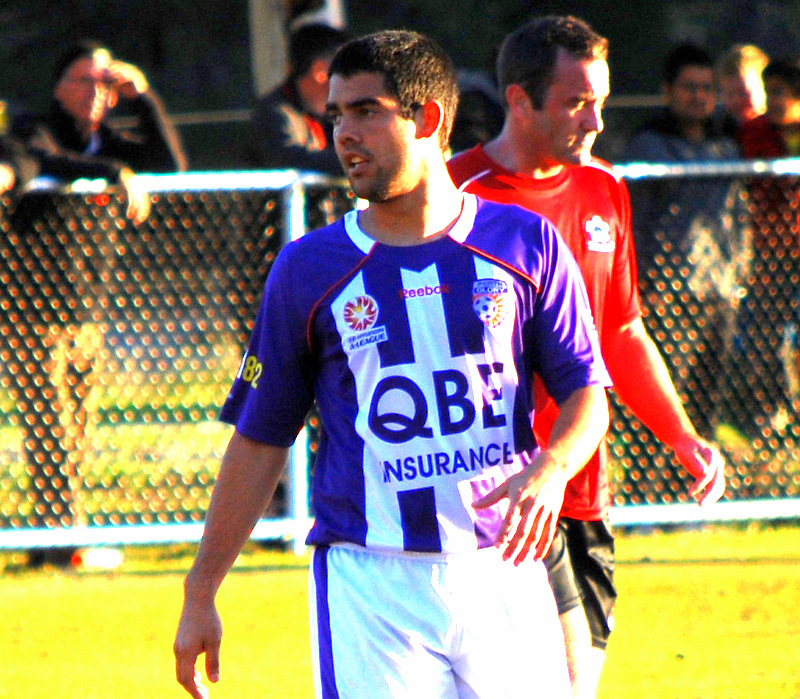
- Jukic playing for Perth Glory in 2010

Personal information
- Full name: Andrija Jukic
- Date of birth: 3 January 1987 (age 39)
- Place of birth: Perth, Western Australia
- Height: 1.81 m (5 ft 11 in)
- Position: Midfielder

Youth career
- 2004–2005: Western Knights
- 2005–2006: Perth Glory

Senior career*
Years	Team	Apps	(Gls)
2006–2007	Western Knights	14	(1)
2007–2008	NK Junak Sinj	2	(0)
2008–2009	Western Knights	25	(5)
2009–2010	Perth SC	5	(0)
2010–2011	Perth Glory	19	(1)
2011–2012	Bogor Raya	20	(2)
2012	Bentleigh Greens	21	(1)
2013–2015	Inglewood United	56	(8)
2016–2018	Bayswater City	66	(5)
2019–2021	Western Knights	54	(9)
- * Club domestic league appearances and goals as of 8 November 2021

Andrija Jukic (born 3 January 1987) is an Australian footballer who plays for Western Knights SC.

== Club career ==
He tried out for the FOX8 reality TV show Football Superstar, but narrowly missed out on making the Perth Top 10, placing 11th, After this Jukic signed for his home town club Perth Glory's 2008/09 Youth League team, where he was a standout. He made his senior debut for Perth Glory as a substitute on 21 December 2008 against Sydney FC.

On 26 February 2009, Jukic signed a two-year deal with Perth Glory. Andrija scored his first goal in the A-League and for his club against Central Coast Mariners on 31 January 2010. Andrija was a part of the Perth Glory team that made finals in the A-League for the first time in the club's history during the 2009/10 season.

== Honours ==
Personal honours

- National Youth League Top Scorer: 2008–2009 with Perth Glory – 6 goals

== See also ==
- He is the brother of Queen's Park FC striker Katarina Jukic.
