= Wayne Srhoj =

Australian soccer player

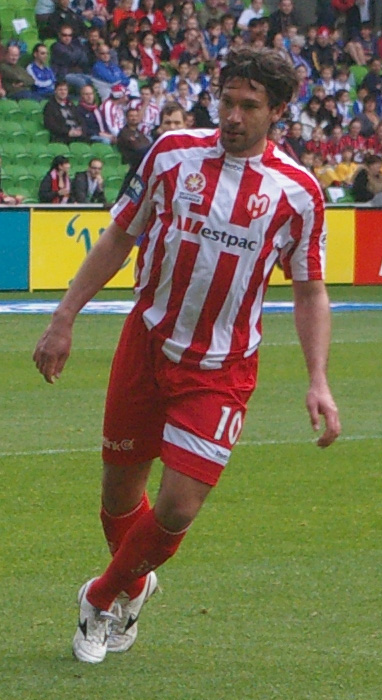

Personal information
- Full name: John Wayne Srhoj
- Date of birth: 23 March 1982 (age 44)
- Place of birth: Mareeba, Australia
- Height: 1.88 m (6 ft 2 in)
- Position: Midfielder

Team information
- Current team: Mareeba United

Youth career
- 1997: AIS

Senior career*
Years	Team	Apps	(Gls)
1997–2001	Brisbane Strikers	22	(0)
2001–2003	Sydney Olympic	41	(0)
2003–2004	Perth Glory	13	(0)
2004–2007	Naţional București	51	(1)
2007–2008	Politehnica Timișoara	26	(0)
2008–2010	Perth Glory	36	(5)
2010–2012	Melbourne Heart	43	(0)
2013–	Mareeba Bulls	109	(34)

International career^{‡}
1999	Australia U-17	6	(0)
2001	Australia U-20	4	(0)
2003–2004	Australia U-23	11	(1)
Medal record
Men's football
Representing Australia
FIFA U-17 World Championship
Runner-up	1999 New Zealand
OFC U-19 Men's Championship
Winner	2001 Cook Islands/New Caledonia
- * Club domestic league appearances and goals as of 27 September 2022 ‡ National team caps and goals as of 17:30, 20 November 2010 (UTC)

Wayne Srhoj (born 23 March 1982, in Mareeba) is an Australian soccer player who plays for Mareeba Bulls FC in the Far North Queensland soccer zone.

== Club career ==
Between summer of 2006 and February 2007, Srhoj and teammate Abiodun Agunbiade did not play a single official game, as they claimed their contract with FC Naţional had run out at the end of the 2005/2006 season. After seven months of controversial court hearings and delays, the final decision favoured the players who then signed with the Timișoara based team FC Timișoara.

FC Timișoara released Srhoj from his contract at the end of the 2007–08 Season. On 4 September 2008 Srhoj signed with Perth for the second time in his career.

On 13 April 2010 Melbourne Heart announced Srhoj would be joining the new franchise for 2010–11 season. He soon became an integral part of the new side, starting in 10 of their first 12 matches. He also picked up five yellow cards in this time, meaning he was suspended for one match.

Srhoj then returned to his home town in Mareeba, and played for the Mareeba United Football Club from 2013, played a key role in the Bulls winning the treble in 2014 and going undefeated in 2015.

== International career ==
Srhoj has represented Australia at U-17, U-20 and U-23 levels. He started in all of Australia's games at both the 1999 U-17 World Cup in New Zealand and the 2001 U-20 World Cup in Argentina. Srhoj featured in many of the Olyroos' lead up games for 2004 Olympics, including the Oceania region Olympic qualifying series and a lead up tour of Switzerland in June, but did not make the final 18-man squad for Athens.

== A-League career statistics ==
(Correct as of 8 March 2010)

Club	Season	League			Finals			Asia			Total		
Club	Season	Apps	Goals	Assists	Apps	Goals	Assists	Apps	Goals	Assists	Apps	Goals	Assists
Perth Glory	2008–09	15	1	1	-	-	-	-	-	-	15	1	1
Perth Glory	2009–10	20	4	0	1	0	0	-	-	-	21	4	2
Melbourne Heart	2010–11	20	0	0	-	-	-	-	-	-	20	0	3
Melbourne Heart	Total	55	5	1	1	0	0	-	-	-	56	5	6

== Honours ==
Sydney Olympic

- (Australia) NSL Championship: 2001–2002

Perth Glory

- (Australia) NSL Championship: 2003–2004

Australia U-20

- OFC U-19 Men's Championship: 2001

Australia U-17

- FIFA U-17 World Championship: 1999 (Runners-up)
