= Scott Bulloch =

Australian footballer

Personal information
- Full name: Scott Bulloch
- Date of birth: 13 August 1984 (age 42)
- Place of birth: Lanark, Scotland
- Height: 1.77 m (5 ft 10 in)
- Positions: Central midfielder; striker

Youth career
- Perth RedStar FC

Senior career*
Years	Team	Apps	(Gls)
2001–2003	Perth RedStar FC	55	(24)
2003-2004	Perth Glory	0	(0)
2004–2005	Wanneroo City SC	44	(39)
2005–2007	Perth SC	31	(17)
2008	Sorrento FC	12	(8)
2008–2010	Perth Glory	30	(3)
2010	Dandenong Thunder	16	(6)
2011–2012	Bentleigh Greens	36	(15)
2013	Stirling Lions	12	(6)
2014–2017	Sorrento FC	61	(11)
- * Club domestic league appearances and goals as of 15 September 2017

Scott Bulloch (born 13 August 1984) is a retired Australian footballer who played professionally for Perth Glory FC.

== A-League career statistics ==
(Correct as of 8 March 2010)

Club	Season	League			Finals			Asia			Total		
Club	Season	Apps 44	Goals 41	Assists	Apps 30	Goals14	Assists	Apps	Goals	Assists	Apps	Goals	Assists
Perth Glory	2008–09	16	1	2	-	-	-	-	-	-	16	1	2
Perth Glory	2009–10	14	2	1	1	0	0	-	-	-	14	2	1
Total		30	3	3	1	0	0	-	-	-	30	3	3
