= Naum Sekulovski =

Australian soccer player

Personal information
- Full name: Naum Sekulovski
- Date of birth: 14 May 1982 (age 44)
- Place of birth: Melbourne, Australia
- Height: 1.81 m (5 ft 11 1/2 in)
- Positions: Centre back; left back; defensive midfielder

Youth career
- Springvale City
- Moorabbin City
- Oakleigh Cannons
- VIS

Senior career*
Years	Team	Apps	(Gls)
1998–1999	Oakleigh Cannons	11	(10)
1999–2001	Gippsland Falcons	24	(2)
2001–2003	Wollongong Wolves	41	(7)
2003–2004	Parramatta Power	4	(1)
2004–2005	Preston Lions	11	(6)
2005–2011	Perth Glory	108	(6)
2011–2012	Persema Malang	22	(1)
2012–2014	Hume City FC	32	(2)
2014–2015	Goulburn Valley Suns	43	(1)
2016–2017	Whittlesea Ranges	46	(4)
2018–2023	Preston Lions	46	(0)

International career
2002	Australia U23	2	(0)
- * Club domestic league appearances and goals as of 19 August 2023

Naum Sekulovski (born 14 May 1982) is an Australian retired soccer player who last played for Preston Lions in the NPL 2 Victoria competition.

== A League career statistics ==
(Correct as of 21 March 2010)

Club	Season	League			Finals			Asia			Total		
Club	Season	Apps	Goals	Assists	Apps	Goals	Assists	Apps	Goals	Assists	Apps	Goals	Assists
Perth Glory	2005–06	17	5	1	-	-	-	-	-	-	17	5	1
Perth Glory	2006–07	16	0	1	-	-	-	-	-	-	16	0	1
Perth Glory	2007–08	12	0	0	-	-	-	-	-	-	12	0	0
Perth Glory	2008–09	16	0	1	-	-	-	-	-	-	16	0	1
Perth Glory	2009–10	26	1	3	1	0	0	-	-	-	27	1	3
Perth Glory	2010–11	20	0	0	-	-	-	-	-	-	20	0	0
Total		107	6	6	1	0	0	-	-	-	108	6	6

== Honours ==
=== Perth Glory FC ===
- Best Clubman: 2010
