= Strebre Delovski =

Australian association football referee (born 1975)

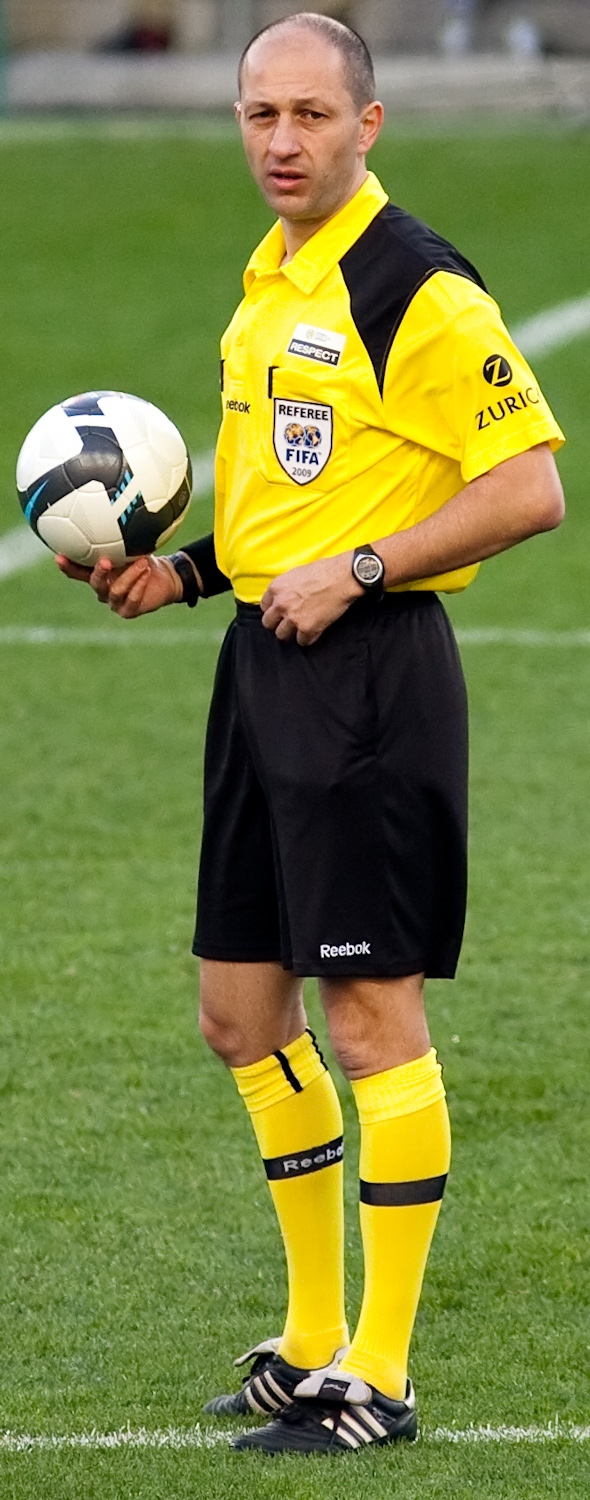
- Full name: Strebre Delovski
- Born: 13 October 1975 (age 51); Australia
- Other occupation: Accountant

Domestic
Years	League	Role
2005–2016	A-League	Referee

International
Years	League	Role
2009–2016	FIFA	Referee
2010–2016	AFC	Referee

Strebre Delovski (born 13 October 1975) is a retired Australian soccer referee in the A-League. He previously officiated in the Illawarra Premier League and during the A-League off-season has been refereeing in the NSW Premier League competition. In 2005 and 2007 he was named NSW Premier League Referee of the Year.

Delovski was the referee for the first leg of the 2009 OFC Champions League Final between Auckland City and Koloale. He was named A-League Referee of the Season at the 2008-09 PFA Footballer of the Year Awards and Referee of the Year at the 2009-10 FFA A-League awards. Delovski was promoted to the FIFA referee panel in January 2009. He was scheduled to officiate a friendly match between Manchester United and Indonesia as part of his two-game assessment to join the Asian elite referee panel but the match was called off due to the 2009 Jakarta bombings. On 10 November 2012, Delovski was the 4th official for the final match of the 2012 AFC Champions League match Ulsan Hyundai vs Al-Ahli SC in Ulsan Munsu Football Stadium .

On 20 April 2016, Delovski announced his retirement 'from active refereeing at the conclusion of the Hyundai A-League 2016 Finals Series'.

On 4 April 2017, Strebre Delovski was appointed as one of the inaugural Video assistant referee (VAR's) in the Hyundai A-League, the first top-tier football league in the world to implement the technology.

== Career ==
=== Awards ===
Year	Award
2009–10	Zurich Referee of the Year

=== A-League Matches ===
- 2005/2006 Season: 2 Matches (Including: 1 Pre-Season)
- 2006/2007 Season: 2 Matches (Including: 2 Pre-Season)
- 2007/2008 Season: 5 Matches (Including: 1 Pre-Season)
- 2008/2009 Season: 16 Matches (Including: 1 Pre-season; Major Semi-Final 1st Leg; Preliminary Final)
- 2009/2010 Season: 24 Matches (Including: Minor Semi-Final; Major Semi-Final 2nd Leg; Final: Melbourne Victory – Sydney FC)
- 2010/2011 Season: 8 Matches (Including: Minor Semi-Final)
- 2011/2012 Season: 21 Matches (Including: 2 Finals Matches)
- 2012/2013 Season: 19 Matches (Including: 1 Pre-Season and 1 Finals match)
- 2013/2014 Season: 17 Matches (Including: 1 Semi Final)
- 2014/2015 Season: 15 Matches (Including: 1 Pre-Season)
- 2015/2016 Season: 18 Matches (Including: 1 Pre-Season, 1 Semi Final and 1 Final (as Fourth Official)

=== International Matches ===
OFC Champions League

- 7 March 2009: Hekari United – Koloale (Group Stage)
- 25 April 2009: Koloale – Auckland City FC (Final: 1st Leg)

AFC Champions League

- 15 May 2012: Buriram United – Guangzhou Evergrande (Group Stage)
- 10 April 2013: Al-Ahli – Sepahan (Group Stage)
- 24 April 2013: Al Jazira – Tractor Sazi (Group Stage)

AFC Cup

- 27 April 2011: Tampines Rovers – Hanoi T&T (Group Stage)
- 10 May 2011: South China – Chonburi (Group Stage)
- 6 March 2012: Sông Lam Nghệ An – Terengganu (Group Stage)
- 10 April 2012: Ayeyawady United – Navibank Sài Gòn (Group Stage)

== International career ==
=== East Asian Football Championship ===
In February 2010, Delovski selected to referee at his first international competition since receiving his FIFA badge in 2009: The East Asian Football Championship held in Japan. He refereed two matches including the final match in which Japan played Korea Republic. The other match he refereed was between Japan and China PR. Delovski was also Fourth official for the China PR – Korea Republic match.

International Matches Officiated

Date	Home	Away	Result	Competition
6 February 2010	Japan	China PR	0–0	2010 East Asian Football Championship
14 February 2010	Japan	South Korea	1–3	2010 East Asian Football Championship
22 March 2013	New Zealand	New Caledonia	2–1	2014 World Cup qualification

== See also ==
- List of football referees
