= Adriano Pellegrino =

Australian soccer player

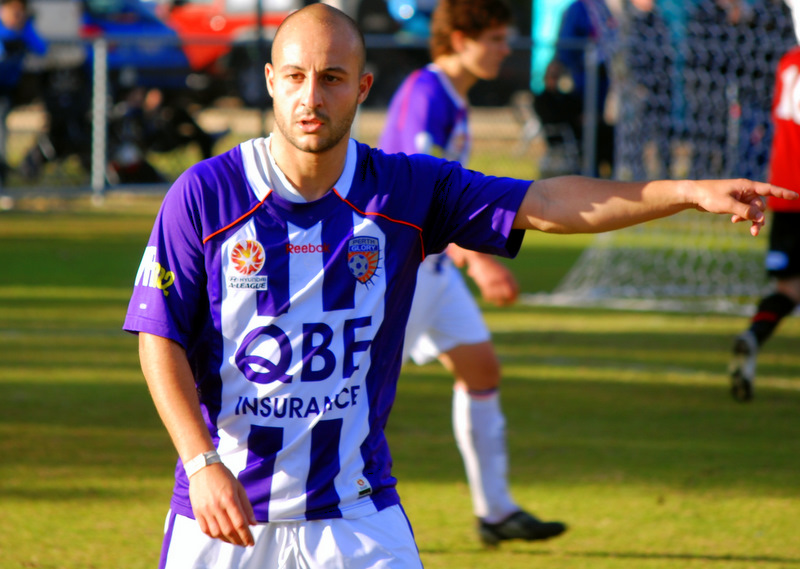

Personal information
- Full name: Adriano Pellegrino
- Date of birth: 9 June 1984 (age 42)
- Place of birth: Adelaide, Australia
- Height: 1.71 m (5 ft 7 in)
- Position: Attacking midfielder

Senior career*
Years	Team	Apps	(Gls)
2000–2003	Adelaide City	57	(6)
2003–2004	Adelaide United	17	(1)
2004	Western Strikers	9	(13)
2005	MetroStars	19	(10)
2005–2006	Panachaiki	22	(4)
2006–2007	Adelaide City	28	(8)
2008	MetroStars	6	(1)
2008–2011	Perth Glory	76	(5)
2011–2013	Central Coast Mariners	14	(0)
2013	CCM Academy	11	(2)
2014	Kedah		
2014	Asia Europe University	1	(0)
2014	Phnom Penh Crown	9	(3)
2015	Udon Thani	30	(5)
2016	Tulsa Roughnecks	11	(0)
2016	Nongbua Pitchaya		
2017–2018	Western Strikers	38	(6)
2019–2020	Adelaide City	23	(1)

International career^{‡}
2002	Australia U-20	9	(2)
Medal record
Representing Australia
Men's Association football
OFC U-20 Championship
Winner	2002 Fiji/Vanuatu
- * Club domestic league appearances and goals as of 7 December 2020 ‡ National team caps and goals as of 23 August 2011

Adriano Pellegrino (born 9 June 1984) is an Australian footballer who plays as a midfielder for Adelaide City.

== Biography ==
=== Club career ===
Pellegrino was with the NSL club Adelaide City between 2000 and 2003 before joining Adelaide United for the 2003-2004 NSL season.

In 2005, he signed for Greek club Panachaiki before returning to Australia to play for South Australian Super League club Adelaide City in 2007.

In 2008, he signed for A-League club Perth Glory FC. Adriano was voted the 2008/09 Most Glorious Player by his peers, garnering twenty-three points for his performances throughout the season, eight points clear of runner-up Jamie Harnwell. During that campaign he scored a sensational goal against Melbourne in Round 14 which was nominated for goal of the year.

In January 2010 he was linked to Scottish club Celtic. However, with the arrival of Paul Slane to Celtic, Adriano decided to stay at Perth Glory.

On 15 April 2011 he signed for A-League outfit Central Coast Mariners. He made his debut and scored in a pre season friendly 3–0 win against Blacktown City. He then went on to win the A-League title with the Mariners and play in the Asian Champions League for the Mariners.

He signed for Thai club Udon Thani F.C. in January 2015.

=== International career ===
Pellegrino represented Australia as a member of the U-20 team that qualified for the 2003 FIFA World Youth Championship.

== Honours ==
Australia U-20

- OFC U-19 Men's Championship: 2002
