= Wellington Phoenix FC results by opposition (N–Z) =

This page details the fixtures, results and statistics between the Wellington Phoenix and their A-League opposition (from N to Z) since the Phoenix joined the competition in the 2007–08 season.

For results and statistics for opposition from A to M, see Wellington Phoenix FC results by opposition (A–M).

== All-time A-League results ==
Includes finals results; does not include pre-season matches or FFA Cup matches.

=== Overall record ===
As of 19 April 2024

Club	Pld	W	D	L	GF	GA	GD
Adelaide United	49	12	15	22	54	92	−38
Brisbane Roar	49	13	15	21	66	71	−5
Central Coast Mariners	48	19	10	19	62	68	−6
Gold Coast United	9	4	3	2	15	9	+6
Melbourne City	39	12	8	19	47	69	−22
Melbourne Victory	49	12	13	24	66	92	−26
Newcastle Jets	49	25	7	17	87	72	+15
North Queensland Fury	6	3	3	0	11	5	+6
Perth Glory	52	21	11	20	74	73	+1
Sydney FC	49	16	6	27	58	87	−29
Western United	13	9	1	3	26	11	+15
Western Sydney Wanderers	34	13	7	14	43	54	−11
Total	456	165	102	190	628	711	−83

=== Home/away record ===
Home
Club	Pld	W	D	L	GF	GA	GD
Adelaide United	11	4	5	2	15	12	+3
Brisbane Roar	11	3	3	5	14	15	−1
Central Coast Mariners	14	4	5	5	15	15	0
Gold Coast United	3	2	1	0	11	3	+8
Melbourne City	9	5	2	2	16	13	+3
Melbourne Victory	11	3	3	5	20	22	−2
Newcastle Jets	15	9	3	3	32	12	+20
North Queensland Fury	4	3	1	0	9	3	+6
Perth Glory	13	6	5	2	21	10	+11
Sydney FC	11	7	1	5	19	18	+1
Western Sydney Wanderers	5	3	1	1	3	2	+1
Total	109	49	30	30	175	125	+50

Away
Club	Pld	W	D	L	GF	GA	GD
Adelaide United	14	3	1	10	13	35	−22
Brisbane Roar	13	1	2	10	12	27	−15
Central Coast Mariners	10	4	0	6	9	16	−7
Gold Coast United	6	2	2	2	4	6	−2
Melbourne City	7	1	4	2	6	7	−1
Melbourne Victory	13	1	3	9	10	29	−19
Newcastle Jets	11	6	1	4	19	18	+1
North Queensland Fury	2	0	2	0	2	2	0
Perth Glory	13	4	1	8	13	20	−7
Sydney FC	13	4	0	9	14	30	−16
Western Sydney Wanderers	4	1	1	2	5	6	−1
Total	106	27	17	62	107	196	−89

== All-time opposition goal scorers ==
Goals scored against the Wellington Phoenix.
Excludes pre-season matches.

Rank	Name	Playing for:											Total
Rank	Name	AU	BR	CCM	GCU	MC	MV	NUJ	NQF	PG	SFC	WSW	Total
1	(Australia) Archie Thompson						9						9
2	(Australia) Mark Bridge							1			4	2	7
3	(Albania) Besart Berisha		6										6
3	(Italy) Alessandro Del Piero										6		6
3	(Australia) Bruce Djite	4			2								6
3	(Indonesia) Sergio van Dijk	2	4										6
7	(Australia) Danny Allsopp						5						5
7	(Costa Rica) Carlos Hernández						5						5
7	(Brazil) Reinaldo		5										5
7	(Australia) David Williams					5							5

== Newcastle Jets ==
=== Statistics ===
==== Results summary ====
Overall								Home						Away					
Pld	W	D	L	GF	GA	GD	Pts	W	D	L	GF	GA	GD	W	D	L	GF	GA	GD
26	15	4	7	51	30	+21	49	9	3	3	32	12	+20	6	1	4	19	18	+1

==== Leading goal scorers ====
Rank	Name	Team	Total
1	(New Zealand) Shane Smeltz		6
2	(New Zealand) Tim Brown		4
2	(England) Chris Greenacre		4
2	(Barbados) Paul Ifill		4
5	(New Zealand) Jeremy Brockie		3
5	(Australia) Adam Taggart		3

==== Discipline ====
Team	Yellow card	Yellow-red card	Red card
Wellington Phoenix	41	2	0
Newcastle Jets	47	3	3

=== Matches ===
26 matches
- 2007–08
  9 September 2007 Round 3	Wellington Phoenix	0–1	Newcastle Jets	Westpac Stadium, Wellington
  		Summary	77' M. Thompson	Attendance: 11,478; Referee: Peter O'Leary
  14 October 2007 Round 8	Newcastle Jets	2–1	Wellington Phoenix	EnergyAustralia Stadium, Newcastle
  	J. Holland 17'; J. Griffiths 40'	Summary	90+4' S. Old	Attendance: 11,947; Referee: Ben Williams
  30 December 2007 Round 18	Newcastle Jets	2–3	Wellington Phoenix	EnergyAustralia Stadium, Newcastle
  	M. Bridge 29' (pen.); S. Tunbridge 81'	Summary	16' S. Smeltz; 49' M. Ferrante; 51' K. Rees	Attendance: 15,107; Referee: Strebre Delovski
  2008–09
  6 October 2008 Round 7	Newcastle Jets	2–2	Wellington Phoenix	EnergyAustralia Stadium, Newcastle
  	T. Elrich 59'; K. Patafta 68'	Summary	52' (pen.), 89' (pen.) S. Smeltz	Attendance: 8,492; Referee: Craig Zetter
  23 November 2008 Round 12	Wellington Phoenix	2–0	Newcastle Jets	Westpac Stadium, Wellington
  	S. Smeltz 79'; T. Hearfield 86'	Summary	(red card) 29' J. Griffiths; (red card) 51' M. Milligan	Attendance: 5,500; Referee: Matthew Breeze
  4 January 2009 Round 18	Wellington Phoenix	3–0	Newcastle Jets	Westpac Stadium, Wellington
  	L. Bertos 62'; S. Smeltz 67', 86' (pen.)	Summary		Attendance: 7,524; Referee: Craig Zetter
  2009–10
  9 August 2009 Round 1	Newcastle Jets	3–2	Wellington Phoenix	EnergyAustralia Stadium, Newcastle
  15:00 AEST; 17:00 NZST	J. Hoffman 12', 23'; J. Naidovski 84'	Summary; Report	26' B. Sigmund; 43' C. Greenacre	Attendance: 6,655; Referee: Chris Beath
  4 November 2009 Round 13	Wellington Phoenix	3–0	Newcastle Jets	Westpac Stadium, Wellington
  18:00 NZDT; 16:00 AEDT	T. Brown 28'; C. Greenacre 55'; P. Ifill 90'	Summary; Report		Attendance: 4,100; Referee: Ben Williams
  22 November 2009 Round 15	Newcastle Jets	0–1	Wellington Phoenix	EnergyAustralia Stadium, Newcastle
  17:00 AEDT; 15:00 NZDT		Summary; Report	14' P. Ifill	Attendance: 4,329; Referee: Peter Green
  7 March 2010 Minor Semi Final	Wellington Phoenix	3 – 1 (a.e.t.)	Newcastle Jets	Westpac Stadium, Wellington
  16:00 NZST	T. Brown 33'; P. Ifill 105'; E. Dadi 115'	Summary; Report	20' M. Thompson	Attendance: 32,792; Referee: Matthew Breeze
  2010–11
  20 November 2010 Round 15	Newcastle Jets	1–0	Wellington Phoenix	EnergyAustralia Stadium, Newcastle
  19:00 AEDT; 21:00 NZDT	M. Jesic 55'	Summary		Attendance: 12,147; Referee: Gerard Parsons
  18 December 2010 Round 21	Wellington Phoenix	4–0	Newcastle Jets	Westpac Stadium, Wellington
  19:00 NZDT; 17:00 AEDT	T. Brown 18'; M. Rojas 31'; C. Greenacre 42'; D. Macallister 89'	Summary; Report		Attendance: 6,053; Referee: Jarred Gillett
  30 January 2011 Round 27	Wellington Phoenix	1–0	Newcastle Jets	Westpac Stadium, Wellington
  17:00 NZDT; 15:00 AEDT	D. Macallister 20'	Summary; Report	(red card) 66' R. Griffiths	Attendance: 10,917; Referee: Chris Beath
  2011–12
  16 October 2011 Round 2	Wellington Phoenix	2–0	Newcastle Jets	Westpac Stadium, Wellington
  16:30 NZDT; 14:30 AEDT	T. Brown 18' (yellow card) 69' (yellow-red card) 90'; Daniel 60'; N. Ward (red card) 82'	Summary; Report		Attendance: 7,643; Referee: Matthew Gillett
  23 December 2011 Round 13	Wellington Phoenix	5–2	Newcastle Jets	Westpac Stadium, Wellington
  19:30 NZDT; 17:30 AEDT	D. Sánchez 15', 33'; C. Greenacre 38'; M. Pavlovic 73', 76'	Summary; Report	50' S. Byun; 88' R. Griffiths	Attendance: 6,471; Referee: Ben Williams
  20 January 2012 Round 18	Newcastle Jets	0–1	Wellington Phoenix	Ausgrid Stadium, Newcastle
  20:00 AEDT; 22:00 NZDT		Summary; Report	57' M. Muscat	Attendance: 11,694; Referee: Matthew Gillett
  2012–13
  18 November 2012 Round 7	Newcastle Jets	0–3	Wellington Phoenix	Hunter Stadium, Newcastle
  15:00 AEDT; 17:00 NZDT		Summary; Report	44', 81' J. Brockie; 87' (pen.) P. Ifill	Attendance: 13,116; Referee: Chris Beath
  27 January 2013 Round 18	Wellington Phoenix	1–1	Newcastle Jets	Westpac Stadium, Wellington
  16:30 NZDT; 14:30 AEDT	L. Fenton 21'; T. Lochhead (yellow card) 36' (yellow-red card) 72'	Summary; Report	(yellow card) 32' (yellow-red card) 54' S. Gallaway; 74' E. Heskey	Attendance: 6,429; Referee: Ben Williams
  27 February 2013 Round 26	Wellington Phoenix	1–2	Newcastle Jets	Westpac Stadium, Wellington
  19:00 NZDT; 17:00 AEDT	J. Brockie 60'	Summary; Report	19' A. Taggart; 44' M. Bridges	Attendance: 4,025; Referee: Kris Griffiths-Jones
  2013–14
  27 October 2013 Round 3	Wellington Phoenix	0–0	Newcastle Jets	McLean Park, Napier
  Sunday, 17:00 NZDT; Sunday, 15:00 AEDT		Summary; Report		Attendance: 9,020; Referee: Adam Kersey
  9 February 2014 Round 18	Newcastle Jets	2–3	Wellington Phoenix	Hunter Stadium, Newcastle
  Sunday, 17:00 AEDT; Sunday, 19:00 NZDT	C. Goodwin 26', 46'	Summary; Report	21' C. Hernández; 33' S. Huysegems; 71' J. Hicks	Attendance: 10,406; Referee: Shaun Evans
  22 March 2014 Round 24	Newcastle Jets	5–0	Wellington Phoenix	Hunter Stadium, Newcastle
  Saturday, 17:30 AEDT; Saturday, 19:30 NZDT	E. Heskey 35'; J. Griffiths 46'; A. Taggart 57', 77'; M. Bridges 90+3'	Summary; Report		Attendance: 9,483; Referee: Strebre Delovski
  2014–15
  26 October 2014 Round 3	Wellington Phoenix	4–1	Newcastle Jets	Westpac Stadium, Wellington
  Sunday, 17:00 NZDT; Sunday, 15:00 AEDT	N. Burns 4', 42'; M. McGlinchey 64'; A. Durante 90+3'	Report	90+1' J. Pepper	Attendance: 7,802; Referee: Chris Beath
  6 December 2014 Round 10	Newcastle Jets	1–3	Wellington Phoenix	Hunter Stadium, Newcastle
  Saturday, 17:00 AEDT; Saturday, 19:00 NZDT	J. Griffiths 24'	Report	73' N. Burns; 74' M. McGlinchey; 78' R. Krishna	Attendance: 9,152; Referee: Adam Fielding
  22 February 2015 Round 19	Wellington Phoenix	2–2	Newcastle Jets	Hutt Recreation Ground, Wellington
  	R. Krishna 68'; J. Hicks 90+4'	Report	12' (o.g.) R. Bonevacia; 18' S. Neville; (yellow card) 21' (yellow-red card) 87' B. Kantarovski	Attendance: 8,437; Referee: Kris Griffiths-Jones
  2015–16
  11 October 2015 Round 1	Wellington Phoenix	1–2	Newcastle Jets	Westpac Stadium, Wellington
  Sunday, 19:00 NZDT; Sunday, 17:00 AEDT	R. Bonevacia 45'	Report; Summary	30' D. Carney; 71' M. Trifunović; (yellow card) 52' (yellow-red card) 77' N. Boogaard	Attendance: 6,255; Referee: Shaun Evans

== North Queensland Fury ==
=== Statistics ===
==== Results summary ====
Overall								Home						Away					
Pld	W	D	L	GF	GA	GD	Pts	W	D	L	GF	GA	GD	W	D	L	GF	GA	GD
6	3	3	0	11	5	+6	12	3	1	0	9	3	+6	0	2	0	2	2	0

==== Leading goal scorers ====
Rank	Name	Team	Total
1	(New Zealand) Leo Bertos		2
1	(England) Chris Greenacre		2
1	(Australia) Dylan Macallister		2

==== Discipline ====
Team	Yellow card	Yellow-red card	Red card
Wellington Phoenix	11	1	0
North Queensland Fury	11	0	1

=== Matches ===
6 matches
- 2009–10
  20 September 2009 Round 7	Wellington Phoenix	1–1	North Queensland Fury	Westpac Stadium, Wellington
  15:00 NZST; 13:00 AEST	L. Bertos 7'	Summary; Report	90' C. Grossman	Attendance: 9,713; Referee: Peter Green
  17 October 2009 Round 10	North Queensland Fury	1–1	Wellington Phoenix	Dairy Farmers Stadium, Townsville
  19:30 AEST; 22:30 NZDT	R. Fowler 85'	Summary; Report	6' T. Brown	Attendance: 6,191; Referee: Chris Beath
  15 January 2010 Round 22	Wellington Phoenix	3–0	North Queensland Fury	Westpac Stadium, Wellington
  19:30 NZDT; 16:30 AEST	E. Dadi 47'; P. Ifill 78'; J. McKain 90'	Summary		Attendance: 7,727; Referee: Peter Green
  2011–12
  24 September 2010 Round 8	Wellington Phoenix	2–1	North Queensland Fury	Westpac Stadium, Wellington
  19:30 NZST; 17:30 AEST	C. Greenacre 4'; L. Bertos 13'; V. Lia (yellow card) 37' (yellow-red card) 64'	Summary	67' M. Hughes	Attendance: 7,212; Referee: Peter O'Leary
  27 December 2010 Round 22	North Queensland Fury	1–1	Wellington Phoenix	Dairy Farmers Stadium, Townsville
  19:15 AEST; 22:15 NZDT	C. Payne 12'	Summary; Report	77' D. Macallister	Attendance: 5,107; Referee: Jarred Gillett
  13 February 2011 Round 30	Wellington Phoenix	3–1	North Queensland Fury	Westpac Stadium, Wellington
  17:00 NZDT; 15:00 AEST	C. Greenacre 7'; D. Macallister 11'; D. Vukovic 90+4' (pen.)	Summary	66' (red card) 90+4' B. Studman	Attendance: 12,731; Referee: Peter O'Leary

== Perth Glory ==
=== Statistics ===
==== Results summary ====
Overall								Home						Away					
Pld	W	D	L	GF	GA	GD	Pts	W	D	L	GF	GA	GD	W	D	L	GF	GA	GD
27	11	6	10	36	31	+5	39	6	5	2	21	10	+11	5	1	8	15	21	−6

==== Leading goal scorers ====
Rank	Name	Team	Total
1	(New Zealand) Shane Smeltz	(3) (2)	5
2	(Barbados) Paul Ifill		4
2	(Fiji) Roy Krishna		4
4	(England) Chris Greenacre		3
5	(New Zealand) Tim Brown		2
5	(Ivory Coast) Eugène Dadi		2
5	(Belgium) Stein Huysegems		2
5	(Republic of Ireland) Andy Keogh		2
5	(Japan) Ryo Nagai		2
5	(Australia) Nikita Rukavytsya		2
5	(Brazil) Sidnei		2
5	(New Zealand) Ben Sigmund		2

==== Discipline ====
Team	Yellow card	Yellow-red card	Red card
Wellington Phoenix	61	2	1
Perth Glory	48	3	3

=== Matches ===
27 matches
- 2007–08
  30 September 2007 Round 6	Wellington Phoenix	4–1	Perth Glory	Westpac Stadium, Wellington
  	R. Aloisi 14'; S. Smeltz 42'; V. Coveny 55'; R. Johnson (yellow card) 62'; Daniel (yellow card) 63'; T. Lochhead 83'; T. Brown (yellow card) 84'	(2–1); Summary	10' B. Celeski; (yellow card) 46' (yellow-red card) 54' D. Djulbic; (yellow card) 47' S. Colosimo	Attendance: 10,127; Referee: Peter Green
  2 November 2007 Round 11	Perth Glory	0–1	Wellington Phoenix	Members Equity Stadium, Perth
  	S. Colosimo (yellow card) 11'; N. Topor-Stanley (yellow card) 68'	(0–1); Report; Summary	(yellow card) 13' V. Lia; 51' (yellow card) 74' Daniel; (yellow card) 78' R. Johnson; (yellow card) 85' J. Christie	Attendance: 7,105; Referee: Simon Przydacz
  7 December 2007 Round 16	Wellington Phoenix	3–0	Perth Glory	Westpac Stadium, Wellington
  	S. Smeltz 29' (pen.), 72' (yellow card) 35'; Felipe 32'	(1–0); Summary	(red card) 34' N. Topor-Stanley; (yellow card) 35' M. Prentice; (yellow card) 37' D. Micevski; (yellow card) 66' H. Foxe; (red card) 73' J. Harnwell	Attendance: 8,039; Referee: Strebre Delovski
  2008–09
  21 September 2008 Round 5	Perth Glory	1–0	Wellington Phoenix	Members Equity Stadium, Perth
  	J. Harnwell (yellow card) 15'; N. Topor-Stanley (yellow card) 38'; E. Dadi 78' (pen.)	(0–0); Summary	(yellow card) 27' R. Johnson; (yellow card) 44' T. Lochhead; (yellow card) 77' J. McKain	Attendance: 4,433; Referee: Strebre Delovski
  2 November 2008 Round 10	Perth Glory	2–0	Wellington Phoenix	Members Equity Stadium, Perth
  	N. Rukavytsya 15', 70'; N. Rizzo (yellow card) 88'	(1–0); Summary	(yellow card) 39' K. Dodd	Attendance: 7,228; Referee: Chris Beath
  13 December 2008 Round 15	Wellington Phoenix	1–1	Perth Glory	Westpac Stadium, Wellington
  	T. Brown 83'	(0–0); Summary	76' E. Dadi	Attendance: 6,362; Referee: Strebre Delovski
  2009–10
  16 August 2009 Round 2	Wellington Phoenix	2–1	Perth Glory	Westpac Stadium, Wellington
  19:30 NZST	M. Ferrante (yellow card) 2'; P. Ifill 24'; L. Bertos 85'	(1–1); Report; Summary	3' V. Sikora; (yellow card) 78' W. Srhoj; (yellow card) 84' A. Pellegrino	Attendance: 10,024; Referee: Peter O'Leary
  8 November 2009 Round 14	Wellington Phoenix	1–1	Perth Glory	Westpac Stadium, Wellington
  17:00 NZDT; 15:00 AEDT	P. Ifill (yellow card) 18' (goal) 82'; V. Lia (yellow card) 35'; B. Sigmund (yellow card) 75'	(0–0); Report; Summary	(yellow card) 63' (goal) 70' W. Srhoj; (yellow card) 81' J. Burns	Attendance: 6,930; Referee: Matthew Gillett
  22 January 2010 Round 23	Perth Glory	2–0	Wellington Phoenix	Members Equity Stadium, Perth
  18:00 AWST; 23:00 NZDT	D. McBreen 23'; T. Howarth 42'; N. Sekulovski (yellow card) 72'; S. Bulloch (yellow card) 83'	(2–0); Summary	(yellow card) 8' T. Brown; (yellow card) 25' E. Dadi; (yellow card) 61' M. Muscat; (yellow card) 72' V. Lia	Attendance: 9,368; Referee: Ryan Shepheard
  21 February 2010 Semi Final 4 v 5	Wellington Phoenix	1 – 1 (a.e.t.)	Perth Glory	Westpac Stadium, Wellington
  17:00 NZST	J. McKain (yellow card) 32' (yellow-red card) 105'; C. Greenacre 37'; E. Dadi (yellow card) 118' P. Ifill (penalty scored); A. Durante (penalty scored); T. Brown (penalty scored); A. Caceres (penalty scored)	(1–0); Report; Summary Penalties; 4 – 2	(yellow card) 21' S. Srhoj; (yellow card) 31' (goal) 67' S. Neville; (yellow card) 60' A. Todd; (yellow card) 72' J. Burns (penalty scored) S. McGarry; (penalty missed) N. Sekulovski; (penalty missed) S. Bulloch; (penalty scored) D. McBreen	Attendance: 24,267; Referee: Strebre Delovski
  2010–11
  5 September 2010 Round 4	Perth Glory	2–1	Wellington Phoenix	nib Stadium, Perth
  15:00 AWST; 19:00 NZST	M. Sterjovski 6' (yellow card) 25'; R. Fowler 61'	(1–0); Summary	(yellow card) 45' Daniel; 73' (yellow card) 79' B. Sigmund; (yellow card) 80' T. Hearfield	Attendance: 10,988; Referee: Ben Williams
  7 November 2010 Round 13	Perth Glory	0–1	Wellington Phoenix	nib Stadium, Perth
  16:00 AWST; 21:00 NZDT	S. Neville (yellow card) 31'; J. Burns (yellow card) 33' (yellow-red card) 80'; B. Griffiths (yellow card) 64'; A. Todd (yellow card) 90+2'	(0–1); Summary	1' (yellow card) 44' T. Brown; (yellow card) 34' V. Lia; (yellow card) 68' S. Elliott; (yellow card) 70' M. Muscat; (yellow card) 90+1' A. Durante	Attendance: 6,676; Referee: Kris Griffiths-Jones
  23 January 2011 Round 25	Wellington Phoenix	4–0	Perth Glory	Westpac Stadium, Wellington
  17:00 NZDT; 13:00 AWST	T. Velaphi 10' (o.g.); D. Macallister 49'; V. Lia 60'; C. Greenacre 90+1'	(1–0); Summary	(yellow card) 34' J. Mitchell	Attendance: 5,115; Referee: Peter O'Leary
  2011–12
  23 October 2011 Round 3	Perth Glory	1–0	Wellington Phoenix	nib Stadium, Perth
  16:30 AWST; 21:30 NZDT	L. Miller (yellow card) 18'; S. Smeltz 32'; C. Coyne (yellow card) 82'	(1–0); Summary	(yellow card) 7' B. Sigmund; (yellow card) 12' (yellow-red card) 90' M. Muscat; (yellow card) 32' Daniel	Attendance: 8,299; Referee: Ben Williams
  10 December 2011 Round 10	Wellington Phoenix	1–0	Perth Glory	Westpac Stadium, Wellington
  17:00 NZDT; 12:00 AWST	P. Ifill (yellow card) 30'; T. Lochhead (yellow card) 31'; T. Brown (yellow card) 40'; B. Sigmund 85'; M. Pavlovic (red card) 90+4'	(0–0); Summary; Report	(yellow card) 64' T. Howarth; (yellow card) 88' J. Mitchell	Attendance: 6,020; Referee: Ryan Shepheard
  8 January 2012 Round 16	Wellington Phoenix	0–1	Perth Glory	Westpac Stadium, Wellington
  16:00 NZDT; 22:00 AWST	T. Lochhead (yellow card) 71'; A. Durante (yellow card) 84'	(0–0); Summary; Report	(yellow card) 82' S. Pantelidis; 90+2' J. Mitchell	Attendance: 3,898; Referee: Kris Griffiths-Jones
  7 April 2012 Minor Semi-Final	Perth Glory	3 – 2 (a.e.t.)	Wellington Phoenix	nib Stadium, Perth
  17:30 AWST; 21:30 NZST	B. van den Brink 12'; Jacob Burns (yellow card) 52'; B. Mehmet 71'; T. Howarth 111' (yellow card) 112'	(1–0); Summary; Report	(yellow card) 28' M. Muscat; (yellow card) 41' T. Brown; 46' C. Greenacre; 54' M. Muscat; (yellow card) 60' L. Bertos	Attendance: 13,695; Referee: Peter Green
  2012–13
  24 November 2012 Round 8	Perth Glory	1–1	Wellington Phoenix	nib Stadium, Perth
  18:45 AWST; 23:45 NZDT	S. Smeltz 62'; J. Burns (yellow card) 66'; L. Miller (yellow card) 90'	(0–0); Summary; Report	(yellow card) 37' V. Lia; (yellow card) 43' B. Sigmund; 73' J. Brockie; (yellow card) 81' A. Durante	Referee: Strebre Delovski
  2 February 2013 Round 19	Wellington Phoenix	1–0	Perth Glory	Eden Park, Auckland
  17:00 NZDT; 15:00 AEDT	J. Brockie 42'; B. Sigmund (yellow card) 60'	(1–0); Summary; Report; Statistics	(yellow card) 85' S. Jamieson	Attendance: 11,566; Referee: Adam Kersey
  17 March 2013 Round 25	Perth Glory	1–2	Wellington Phoenix	nib Stadium, Perth
  19:00 AEDT; 21:00 NZDT	L. Miller (yellow card) 53'; R. Nagai 76'	(0–1); Summary; Report; Stats	35' P. Ifill; (yellow card) 38' T. Lochhead; (yellow card) 55' A. Durante; (yellow card) 66' C. Gameiro; 67' S. Huysegems; (yellow card) 73' P. Ifill; (yellow card) 81' L. Bertos	Attendance: 6360; Referee: Jarred Gillett
  2013–14
  9 November 2013 Round 5	Wellington Phoenix	1–1	Perth Glory	AMI Stadium, Christchurch
  Saturday, 17:00 NZDT; Saturday, 12:00 AWST	A. Durante 4'; T. Boyd (yellow card) 83'	Summary; Report	29' R. Nagai; (yellow card) 72' S. Jamieson; (yellow card) 75' D. Vuković	Attendance: 9,671; Referee: Alan Milliner
  6 December 2013 Round 9	Perth Glory	4–2	Wellington Phoenix	nib Stadium, Perth
  Friday, 18:45 AWST; Friday, 23:45 NZDT	Sidnei 16', 90+1' (yellow card) 90+1'; R. Edwards (yellow card) 59'; M. Thwaite 60'; A. Zahra 82'	Summary; Report	36' S. Huysegems; 49' P. Ifill; (yellow card) 64' L. Fenton; (yellow card) 72' A. Riera	Attendance: 8,232; Referee: Matthew Gillett
  9 March 2014 Round 22	Wellington Phoenix	1–1	Perth Glory	Westpac Stadium, Wellington
  Sunday, 17:00 NZDT; Sunday, 15:00 AWST	C. Hernández (yellow card) 32'; K. Cunningham 85'	Report	(yellow card) 30' J. Clisby; 34' W. Gallas; (yellow card) 90' N. Marinkovic	Attendance: 6,401; Referee: Jarred Gillett
  2014–15
  12 October 2014 Round 1	Wellington Phoenix	1–2	Perth Glory	Westpac Stadium, Wellington
  Sunday, 17:00 NZDT; Sunday, 12:00 AWST	M. McGlinchey 73'	Report	A. Keogh 32'; J. Maclaren 86'	Attendance: 7,767; Referee: Alan Milliner
  22 November 2014 Round 7	Perth Glory	2–1	Wellington Phoenix	nib Stadium, Perth
  Saturday, 18:30 AWST; Saturday, 23:30 NZDT	D. De Silva 2'; A. Keogh 63'; R. Zadkovich (red card) 63'	Report	84' (pen.) R. Krishna	Attendance: 9,233; Referee: Lucien Laverdure
  14 March 2015 Round 21	Perth Glory	1–2	Wellington Phoenix	nib Stadium, Perth
  Sunday, 18:30 AWST; Sunday, 23:30 NZDT	R. Zadkovich 29'	Report	23', 78' R. Krishna	Attendance: 9,178; Referee: Chris Beath
  2015–16
  18 October 2015 Round 2	Perth Glory	1–2	Wellington Phoenix	nib Stadium, Perth
  Sunday, 16:00 AWST	G. Sándor 7'; R. Garcia (yellow card) 72' (yellow-red card) 84'	Report; Summary	9' R. Krishna; 89' V. Lia	Attendance: 8,145; Referee: Stephen Lucas

== Sydney FC ==
=== Statistics ===
==== Results summary ====
Overall								Home						Away					
Pld	W	D	L	GF	GA	GD	Pts	W	D	L	GF	GA	GD	W	D	L	GF	GA	GD
24	11	1	12	32	43	−11	34	7	1	3	18	13	+5	4	0	9	14	30	−16

==== Leading goal scorers ====
Rank	Name	Team	Total
1	(Italy) Alessandro Del Piero		6
2	(Barbados) Paul Ifill		5
3	(Australia) Mark Bridge		4
3	(Australia) Alex Brosque		4
5	(New Zealand) Tim Brown		3
5	(Brazil) Bruno Cazarine		3
5	(Australia) Brendan Gan		3
5	(New Zealand) Ben Sigmund		3

==== Discipline ====
Team	Yellow card	Yellow-red card	Red card
Wellington Phoenix	42	1	2
Sydney FC	38	3	1

=== Matches ===
24 matches
- 2007–08
  14 September 2007 Round 4	Sydney FC	1–2	Wellington Phoenix	Sydney Football Stadium, Sydney
  	A. Casey 6'; M. Rudan (yellow card) 56'; B. Šantalab (yellow card) 65'; R. Zadkovich (yellow card) 85'; D. Zdrilic (yellow card) 89'	(1–2); Summary	8' Felipe; 29' (pen.) (yellow card) 30' Daniel; (yellow card) 85' R. Aloisi; (yellow card) 85' G. Moss	Attendance: 11,491; Referee: Matthew Breeze
  17 November 2007 Round 13	Wellington Phoenix	1–1	Sydney FC	Westpac Stadium, Wellington
  	R. Aloisi 29'; S. Old (yellow card) 61' (yellow-red card) 90'; K. Rees (yellow card) 76'; V. Coveny (yellow card) 78'	(1–0); Summary	(yellow card) 27' (yellow-red card) 69' T. Popovic; 90+3' (pen.) U. Talay	Attendance: 8,062; Referee: Peter Green
  4 January 2008 Round 19	Wellington Phoenix	0–2	Sydney FC	Westpac Stadium, Wellington
  	K. Rees (yellow card) 14'; R. Johnson (yellow card) 80'; S. Smeltz (yellow card) 81'; T. Lochhead (yellow card) 85'; R. Aloisi (red card) 90'	(0–0); Summary	(yellow card) 26' U. Talay; 79' T. McFlynn; 83' A. Brosque	Attendance: 14,288; Referee: Ben Williams
  2008–09
  28 September 2008 Round 6	Wellington Phoenix	2–1	Sydney FC	Westpac Stadium, Wellington
  	S. Smeltz 42'; V. Coveny (yellow card) 48'; M. Muscat (yellow card) 68'; T. Brown 76'; A. Kwasnik (yellow card) 84'	(1–1); Summary	20' A. Brosque; (yellow card) 79' S. Musialik	Attendance: 6,729; Referee: Chris Beath
  7 November 2008 Round 11	Sydney FC	1–2	Wellington Phoenix	Sydney Football Stadium, Sydney
  	S. Musialik 77'	(0–1); Summary	34' L. Bertos; 89' (pen.) S. Smeltz	Attendance: 12,856; Referee: Craig Zetter
  11 January 2009 Round 19	Sydney FC	1–0	Wellington Phoenix	Sydney Football Stadium, Sydney
  	T. McFlynn (yellow card) 24'; A. Brosque (yellow card) 64'; K. Danning 85'	(0–0); Summary	(yellow card) 32' M. Ferrante; (yellow card) 37' J. McKain; (red card) 64' T. Hearfield; (yellow card) 90' M. Muscat	Attendance: 9,605; Referee: Ben Williams
  2009–10
  30 August 2009 Round 4	Sydney FC	2–0	Wellington Phoenix	Sydney Football Stadium, Sydney
  17:00 AEST; 19:00 NZST	B. Gan 77'; J. Aloisi 81'	(0–0); Report; Summary	(yellow card) 22' P. Ifill	Attendance: 11,718; Referee: Strebre Delovski
  1 November 2009 Round 12	Sydney FC	3–1	Wellington Phoenix	Sydney Football Stadium, Sydney
  17:00 AEDT; 19:00 NZDT	M. Bridge 15', 35'; S. Corica (yellow card) 30' (goal) 32'; S. Colosimo (yellow card) 60'; K. Kisel (yellow card) 71'; S. Musialik (yellow card) 90'	(3–0); Report; Summary	(yellow card) 39' V. Lia; 81' K. Barbarouses	Attendance: 10,653; Referee: Gerard Parsons
  12 December 2009 Round 18	Wellington Phoenix	0–1	Sydney FC	FMG Stadium, Palmerston North
  17:00 NZDT; 15:00 AEDT	J. McKain (yellow card) 15'; V. Lia (yellow card) 34'; Daniel (yellow card) 90'	(0–1); Report; Summary	16' (pen.) (yellow card) 71' S. Corica; (yellow card) 78' A. Brosque; (red card) 80' S. Colosimo; (yellow card) 84' C. Bolton	Attendance: 6,459; Referee: Michael Hester
  13 March 2010 Preliminary Final	Sydney FC	4–2	Wellington Phoenix	Sydney Football Stadium, Sydney
  20:00 AEST	C. Payne 22', 31' (yellow card) 84'; A. Brosque 63'; T. McFlynn (yellow card) 66'; M. Bridge 71'	(2–1); Report; Summary	27' A. Durante; 81' E. Dadi	Attendance: 13,196; Referee: Peter Green
  2010–11
  11 September 2010 Round 5	Wellington Phoenix	2–1	Sydney FC	Westpac Stadium, Wellington
  19:15 NZST; 17:15 AEST	P. Ifill 50' (pen.); N. Ward 72'	(0–0); Summary	(yellow card) 49' (goal) 67' B. Cazarine	Attendance: 8,453; Referee: Chris Beath
  1 December 2010 Round 18	Sydney FC	3–1	Wellington Phoenix	Sydney Football Stadium, Sydney
  19:00 AEDT; 21:00 NZDT	B. Gan 14'; M. Bridge 74'; A. Brosque 76'	(1–0); Report; Summary	(yellow card) 78' B. Sigmund; 83' D. Macallister	Attendance: 4,012; Referee: Gerard Parsons
  9 February 2011 Round 29	Sydney FC	2–0	Wellington Phoenix	Sydney Football Stadium, Sydney
  19:00 AEST; 21:00 NZDT	N. Ward 55' (o.g.); B. Gan 69'	(0–0); Summary		Attendance: 4,732; Referee: Peter Green
  2011–12
  27 November 2011 Round 8	Wellington Phoenix	2–1	Sydney FC	Westpac Stadium, Wellington
  16:30 NZDT; 14:30 AEDT	P. Ifill 7'; T. Brown 59'; A. Durante (yellow card) 71'; M. Muscat (yellow card) 73'	(1–0); Report; Summary	(yellow card) 62' S. Jamieson; 70' B. Cazarine	Attendance: 6,308; Referee: Ryan Shepheard
  4 January 2012 Round 15	Wellington Phoenix	4–2	Sydney FC	Westpac Stadium, Wellington
  15:00 NZDT; 13:00 AEDT	V. Lia (yellow card) 15'; Daniel 24' (pen.); D. Sánchez 41'; Ben Sigmund 77'; Paul Ifill 90+4'	(2–1); Summary; Report	15' (pen.) B. Emerton; (yellow card) 24' J. Coyne; 63' B. Cazarine; (yellow card) 67' T. Antonis	Attendance: 8,411; Referee: Alan Milliner
  25 February 2012 Round 23	Sydney FC	0–1	Wellington Phoenix	Sydney Football Stadium, Sydney
  17:30 AEDT	J. Chianese (yellow card) 23'; M. Beauchamp (yellow card) 63'	(0–1); Summary; Report	13' P. Ifill; (yellow card) 68' V. Lia	Attendance: 10,165; Referee: Peter Green
  30 March 2012 Semi-Final 4 v 5	Wellington Phoenix	3–2	Sydney FC	Westpac Stadium, Wellington
  20:00 NZDT; 18:00 AEDT	T. Brown (yellow card) 28' (goal) 47'; D. Sánchez (yellow card) 31'; B. Sigmund 78'; P. Ifill 86' (pen.); V. Lia (yellow card) 89'	(0–0); Summary; Report	(yellow card) 27' S. Jamieson; (yellow card) 44' B. Cazarine; 79', 83' J. Chianese; (yellow card) 84' M. Beauchamp	Attendance: 10,019; Referee: Chris Beath
  2012–13
  6 October 2012 Round 1	Wellington Phoenix	2–0	Sydney FC	Westpac Stadium, Wellington
  19:30 NZDT; 16:30 AEST	S. Huysegems 43'; J. Brockie (yellow card) 70'; L. Fenton 75'	(1–0); Report; Summary	(yellow card) 19' T. Antonis; (yellow card) 47' T. McFlynn	Attendance: 12,057; Referee: Peter Green
  9 December 2012 Round 10	Wellington Phoenix	1–2	Sydney FC	Westpac Stadium, Wellington
  16:30 NZDT; 14:30 AEDT	J. Brockie (yellow card) 9' (goal) 90+2' (pen.); L. Bertos (yellow card) 74'	(0–1); Summary; Report; Stats	(yellow card) 13' (yellow-red card) 86' T. McFlynn; (yellow card) 38' B. Powell; 45+1' S. Ryall; 70' R. Grant; (yellow card) 77' A. Al-Hilfi; (yellow card) 90+1' A. Griffiths	Attendance: 7,375; Referee: Kris Griffiths-Jones
  19 January 2013 Round 17	Sydney FC	7–1	Wellington Phoenix	Allianz Stadium, Sydney
  17:30 AEDT; 19:30 NZDT	J. Griffiths 11'; A. Del Piero 21', 23' (pen.), 39', 70'; J. Culina 26'; A. Abbas (yellow card) 68'; Y. Yau 84'	(5–0); Summary; Report; Statistics	(yellow card) 22' A. Durante; (yellow card) 38' V. Lia; (yellow card) 47' (goal) 80' B. Sigmund; (yellow card) 73' J. Brockie	Attendance: 12,691; Referee: Kris Griffiths-Jones
  2013–14
  23 November 2013 Round 7	Sydney FC	2–1	Wellington Phoenix	Allianz Stadium, Sydney
  Saturday, 17:30 AEDT; Saturday, 19:30 NZDT	R. Garcia 35'; P. Bojić (yellow card) 6' (yellow-red card) 74'; N. Carle (yellow card) 51'; R. Despotović 90+4'	Summary; Report	(yellow card) 27' M. Muscat; (yellow card) 83' (goal) 90+1' K. Cunningham	Attendance: 14,503; Referee: Jarred Gillett
  22 December 2013 Round 11	Wellington Phoenix	1–0	Sydney FC	Westpac Stadium, Wellington
  Sunday, 19:00 NZDT; Sunday, 17:00 AEDT	S. Huysegems 33'; J. Brockie (yellow card) 80'; A. Durante (yellow card) 82'	Summary; Report	(yellow card) 74' C. Gameiro	Attendance: 6,339; Referee: Peter O'Leary
  6 April 2014 Round 26	Sydney FC	4–1	Wellington Phoenix	Allianz Stadium, Sydney
  Sunday, 17:00 AEDT; Sunday, 19:00 NZDT	A. Del Piero 33' (pen.), 45' (yellow card) 68'; V. Janjetovic (yellow card) 37'; M. Jurman (yellow card) 37'; M. Dimitrijevic (yellow card) 38'; N. Petkovic (yellow card) 55'; S. Ryall 57'; A. Abbas 60'	Summary; Report	(yellow card) 32' J. Brockie; (yellow card) 36' B. Sigmund; 56' (pen.) C. Hernández; (yellow card) 74' M. Boxall	Attendance: 10,148; Referee: Kris Griffiths-Jones
  2014–15
  21 December 2014 Round 12	Sydney FC	0–2	Wellington Phoenix	Allianz Stadium, Sydney
  Sunday, 17:00 AEDT; Sunday, 19:00 NZDT		Report	73', 81' N. Burns	Attendance: 14,672; Referee: Shaun Evans
  29 March 2015 Round 23	Wellington Phoenix	v	Sydney FC	Westpac Stadium, Wellington
  Sunday, 17:00 NZDT; Sunday, 15:00 AEDT
  26 April 2015 Round 27	Wellington Phoenix	v	Sydney FC	Westpac Stadium, Wellington
  Sunday, 17:00 NZST; Sunday, 15:00 AEST

== Western Sydney Wanderers ==
=== Statistics ===
==== Results summary ====
Overall								Home						Away					
Pld	W	D	L	GF	GA	GD	Pts	W	D	L	GF	GA	GD	W	D	L	GF	GA	GD
8	4	2	2	8	6	+2	14	3	1	1	3	2	+1	1	1	1	5	4	+1

==== Leading goal scorers ====
Rank	Name	Team	Total
1	(New Zealand) Jeremy Brockie		3
2	(Australia) Mark Bridge		2
2	(Belgium) Stein Huysegems		2
4	(New Zealand) Tyler Boyd		1
4	(Australia) Nathan Burns		1
4	(Australia) Labinot Haliti		1
4	(Japan) Shinji Ono		1
4	(Germany) Jérome Polenz		1
4	(Australia) Nikolai Topor-Stanley		1

==== Discipline ====
Team	Yellow card	Yellow-red card	Red card
Wellington Phoenix	17	0	0
Western Sydney Wanderers	8	0	0

=== Matches ===
8 matches
- 2012–13
  2 December 2012 Round 9	Wellington Phoenix	1–0	Western Sydney Wanderers	Westpac Stadium, Wellington
  16:30 NZDT; 14:30 AEDT	J. Brockie 22'	Summary; Report		Attendance: 5,405; Referee: Matthew Gillett
  13 January 2013 Round 16	Wellington Phoenix	0–2	Western Sydney Wanderers	Westpac Stadium, Wellington
  16:30 NZDT; 14:30 AEDT		Summary; Report	71' N. Topor-Stanley; 82' L. Haliti	Attendance: 6,608; Referee: Shaun Evans
  10 March 2013 Round 24	Western Sydney Wanderers	2–1	Wellington Phoenix	Parramatta Stadium, Sydney
  17:00 AEDT; 19:00 NZDT	S. Ono 8' (pen.); M. Bridge 49' (pen.)	Summary; Report; Statistics	22' J. Brockie	Attendance: 15,809; Referee: Strebre Delovski
  2013–14
  20 October 2013 Round 2	Western Sydney Wanderers	1–1	Wellington Phoenix	Parramatta Stadium, Sydney
  Sunday, 17:00 AEDT; Sunday, 19:00 NZDT	J. Polenz 16'	Report	60' J. Brockie	Attendance: 16,294; Referee: Jarred Gillett
  1 December 2013 Round 8	Wellington Phoenix	0–0	Western Sydney Wanderers	Westpac Stadium, Wellington
  Sunday, 17:00 NZDT; Sunday, 15:00 AEDT		Summary; Report		Attendance: 7,147; Referee: Lucien Laverdure
  1 January 2014 Round 13	Western Sydney Wanderers	1–3	Wellington Phoenix	Parramatta Stadium, Sydney
  Wednesday, 19:00 AEDT; Wednesday, 21:00 NZDT	M. Bridge 62'	Summary; Report	68' T. Boyd; 78', 84' S. Huysegems	Attendance: 14,151; Referee: Lucien Laverdure
  2014–15
  7 November 2014 Round 5	Wellington Phoenix	1–0	Western Sydney Wanderers	Westpac Stadium, Wellington
  Friday, 19:30 NZDT; Friday, 17:30 AEDT	N. Burns 79'	Report		Attendance: 7,008; Referee: Lucien Laverdure
  28 December 2014 Round 13	Wellington Phoenix	1–0	Western Sydney Wanderers	Westpac Stadium, Wellington
  Sunday, 19:00 NZDT; Sunday, 17:00 AEDT	R. Krishna 14'	Report		Attendance: 8,606; Referee: Peter O'Leary
  8 February 2015 Round 17	Western Sydney Wanderers	v	Wellington Phoenix	Pirtek Stadium, Sydney
  Sunday, 17:00 AEDT; Sunday, 19:00 NZDT
