= Wellington Phoenix FC results by opposition (A–M) =

This page details the fixtures, results and statistics between the Wellington Phoenix and their A-League opposition (from A to M) since the Phoenix joined the competition in the 2007–08 season.

For results and statistics for opposition from N to Z, see Wellington Phoenix FC results by opposition (N–Z).

== All-time A-League results ==
Includes finals results; does not include pre-season matches or FFA Cup matches.

=== Overall record ===
As of 19 April 2024

| Club | Pld | W | D | L | GF | GA | GD |
|---|---|---|---|---|---|---|---|
| Adelaide United | 49 | 12 | 15 | 22 | 54 | 92 | −38 |
| Brisbane Roar | 49 | 13 | 15 | 21 | 66 | 71 | −5 |
| Central Coast Mariners | 48 | 19 | 10 | 19 | 62 | 68 | −6 |
| Gold Coast United | 9 | 4 | 3 | 2 | 15 | 9 | +6 |
| Melbourne City | 39 | 12 | 8 | 19 | 47 | 69 | −22 |
| Melbourne Victory | 49 | 12 | 13 | 24 | 66 | 92 | −26 |
| Newcastle Jets | 49 | 25 | 7 | 17 | 87 | 72 | +15 |
| North Queensland Fury | 6 | 3 | 3 | 0 | 11 | 5 | +6 |
| Perth Glory | 52 | 21 | 11 | 20 | 74 | 73 | +1 |
| Sydney FC | 49 | 16 | 6 | 27 | 58 | 87 | −29 |
| Western United | 13 | 9 | 1 | 3 | 26 | 11 | +15 |
| Western Sydney Wanderers | 34 | 13 | 7 | 14 | 43 | 54 | −11 |
| Total | 456 | 165 | 102 | 190 | 628 | 711 | −83 |

=== Home/away record ===
Home
| Club | Pld | W | D | L | GF | GA | GD |
|---|---|---|---|---|---|---|---|
| Adelaide United | 11 | 4 | 5 | 2 | 15 | 12 | +3 |
| Brisbane Roar | 12 | 4 | 3 | 5 | 17 | 17 | 0 |
| Central Coast Mariners | 14 | 4 | 5 | 5 | 15 | 15 | 0 |
| Gold Coast United | 3 | 2 | 1 | 0 | 11 | 3 | +8 |
| Melbourne City | 9 | 5 | 2 | 2 | 16 | 13 | +3 |
| Melbourne Victory | 11 | 3 | 3 | 5 | 20 | 22 | −2 |
| Newcastle Jets | 15 | 9 | 3 | 3 | 32 | 12 | +20 |
| North Queensland Fury | 4 | 3 | 1 | 0 | 9 | 3 | +6 |
| Perth Glory | 13 | 6 | 5 | 2 | 21 | 10 | +11 |
| Sydney FC | 11 | 7 | 1 | 5 | 19 | 18 | +1 |
| Western Sydney Wanderers | 5 | 3 | 1 | 1 | 3 | 2 | +1 |
| Total | 110 | 50 | 30 | 30 | 178 | 127 | +51 |

Away
| Club | Pld | W | D | L | GF | GA | GD |
|---|---|---|---|---|---|---|---|
| Adelaide United | 14 | 3 | 1 | 10 | 13 | 35 | −22 |
| Brisbane Roar | 13 | 1 | 2 | 10 | 12 | 27 | −15 |
| Central Coast Mariners | 10 | 4 | 0 | 6 | 9 | 16 | −7 |
| Gold Coast United | 6 | 2 | 2 | 2 | 4 | 6 | −2 |
| Melbourne City | 7 | 1 | 4 | 2 | 6 | 7 | −1 |
| Melbourne Victory | 13 | 1 | 3 | 9 | 10 | 29 | −19 |
| Newcastle Jets | 11 | 6 | 1 | 4 | 19 | 18 | +1 |
| North Queensland Fury | 2 | 0 | 2 | 0 | 2 | 2 | 0 |
| Perth Glory | 14 | 5 | 1 | 8 | 15 | 21 | −6 |
| Sydney FC | 13 | 4 | 0 | 9 | 14 | 30 | −16 |
| Western Sydney Wanderers | 4 | 1 | 1 | 2 | 5 | 6 | −1 |
| Total | 107 | 28 | 17 | 62 | 109 | 197 | −88 |

== All-time opposition goal scorers ==
Goals scored against the Wellington Phoenix.
Excludes pre-season matches.

| Rank | Name | Playing for: | | | | | | | | | | | Total |
| Rank | Name | AU | BR | CCM | GCU | MC | MV | NUJ | NQF | PG | SFC | WSW | Total |
|---|---|---|---|---|---|---|---|---|---|---|---|---|---|
| 1 | (Australia) Archie Thompson | | | | | | 9 | | | | | | 9 |
| 2 | (Australia) Mark Bridge | | | | | | | 1 | | | 4 | 2 | 7 |
| 3 | (Albania) Besart Berisha | | 6 | | | | | | | | | | 6 |
| 3 | (Italy) Alessandro Del Piero | | | | | | | | | | 6 | | 6 |
| 3 | (Australia) Bruce Djite | 4 | | | 2 | | | | | | | | 6 |
| 3 | (Indonesia) Sergio van Dijk | 2 | 4 | | | | | | | | | | 6 |
| 7 | (Australia) Danny Allsopp | | | | | | 5 | | | | | | 5 |
| 7 | (Costa Rica) Carlos Hernández | | | | | | 5 | | | | | | 5 |
| 7 | (Brazil) Reinaldo | | 5 | | | | | | | | | | 5 |
| 7 | (Australia) David Williams | | | | | 5 | | | | | | | 5 |

== Adelaide United ==
=== Statistics ===
==== Results summary ====
| Overall | | | | | | | | Home | | | | | | Away | | | | | |
| Pld | W | D | L | GF | GA | GD | Pts | W | D | L | GF | GA | GD | W | D | L | GF | GA | GD |
|---|---|---|---|---|---|---|---|---|---|---|---|---|---|---|---|---|---|---|---|
| 25 | 7 | 6 | 12 | 28 | 47 | −19 | 27 | 4 | 5 | 2 | 15 | 12 | +3 | 3 | 1 | 10 | 13 | 35 | −22 |

==== Leading goal scorers ====
| Rank | Name | Team | Total |
|---|---|---|---|
| 1 | (Brazil) Cristiano | | 4 |
| 1 | (Australia) Bruce Djite | | 4 |
| 1 | (Argentina) Jerónimo | | 4 |
| 4 | (Argentina) Marcelo Carrusca | | 3 |
| 4 | (Brazil) Cássio | | 3 |
| 4 | (Spain) Sergio Cirio | | 3 |
| 4 | (Australia) Travis Dodd | | 3 |
| 4 | (Australia) Lucas Pantelis | | 3 |
| 4 | (Costa Rica) Kenny Cunningham | | 3 |

==== Discipline ====
| Team | Yellow card | Yellow-red card | Red card |
|---|---|---|---|
| Wellington Phoenix | 62 | 2 | 1 |
| Adelaide United | 46 | 2 | 1 |

=== Matches ===
25 matches
- 2007–08
  | 22 September 2007 Round 5 | Wellington Phoenix | 2–2 | Adelaide United | Westpac Stadium, Wellington |
  | | Felipe 65'; S. Smeltz 87' | Summary | 70' Diego; 78' B. Djite | Attendance: 12,127; Referee: Ben Williams |
  | 28 October 2007 Round 10 | Adelaide United | 4–1 | Wellington Phoenix | Hindmarsh Stadium, Adelaide |
  | | D. Giraldi 5'; N. Burns 45+3'; L. Pantelis 50'; S. Spagnuolo 75' | Summary | 3' S. Smeltz | Attendance: 11,740; Referee: Simon Przydacz |
  | 30 November 2007 Round 15 | Wellington Phoenix | 1–2 | Adelaide United | Westpac Stadium, Wellington |
  | | Daniel 69' (pen.) | Summary | 9' P. Agostino; (yellow card) 50' (yellow-red card) 68' M. Susak; 79' L. Pantelis | Attendance: 18,345; Referee: Craig Zetter |
  2008–09
  | 30 August 2008 Round 3 | Adelaide United | 3–0 | Wellington Phoenix | Hindmarsh Stadium, Adelaide |
  | | L. Pantelis 15'; Cristiano 49', 60' | Summary | | Attendance: 7,832; Referee: Matthew Breeze |
  | 5 December 2008 Round 14 | Adelaide United | 6–1 | Wellington Phoenix | Hindmarsh Stadium, Adelaide |
  | | S. Ognenovski 21'; Cristiano 42', 74'; Cássio 57', 70'; T. Dodd 90' | Summary | 56' Fred | Attendance: 9,442; Referee: Matthew Breeze |
  | 18 January 2009 Round 20 | Wellington Phoenix | 1–1 | Adelaide United | Westpac Stadium, Wellington |
  | | T. Brown (yellow card) 28' (yellow-red card) 51'; K. Barbarouses 31' | Summary | 9' P. Reid | Attendance: 8,241; Referee: Chris Beath |
  2009–10
  | 4 September 2009 Round 5 | Wellington Phoenix | 1–1 | Adelaide United | Westpac Stadium, Wellington |
  | 19:30 NZST; 17:00 ACDT | P. Ifill 35' | Report; Summary | 42' I. Fyfe | Attendance: 7,523; Referee: Michael Hester |
  | 18 December 2009 Round 19 | Adelaide United | 1–1 | Wellington Phoenix | Hindmarsh Stadium, Adelaide |
  | 20:00 ACDT; 22:30 NZDT | Alemao 57' | Report; Summary | 77' (o.g.) E. Galekovic | Attendance: 9,070; Referee: Craig Zetter |
  | 30 January 2010 Round 25 | Wellington Phoenix | 1–0 | Adelaide United | AMI Stadium, Christchurch |
  | 17:00 NZDT; 14:30 ACDT | J. McKain 22' | Report; Summary | | Attendance: 19,279; Referee: Peter O'Leary |
  2010–11
  | 22 October 2010 Round 11 | Adelaide United | 3–0 | Wellington Phoenix | Hindmarsh Stadium, Adelaide |
  | 19:30 ACDT; 22:00 NZDT | S. van Dijk 71'; M. Flores 72'; T. Dodd 77' | Summary | | Attendance: 11,026; Referee: Alan Milliner |
  | 5 December 2010 Round 19 | Wellington Phoenix | 2–1 | Adelaide United | AMI Stadium, Christchurch |
  | 17:00 NZDT; 14:30 ACDT | T. Brown 46'; B. Sigmund 90+4' | Summary | 14' S. van Dijk; (red card) 83' T. Dodd | Attendance: 14,108; Referee: Peter O'Leary |
  | 5 February 2011 Round 28 | Adelaide United | 0–1 | Wellington Phoenix | Hindmarsh Stadium, Adelaide |
  | 18:30 ACST; 21:00 NZDT | | Report; Summary | 35' C. Greenacre | Attendance: 7,498; Referee: Matthew Breeze |
  | 18 February 2011 Semi-Final 3 v 6 | Adelaide United | 1–0 | Wellington Phoenix | Hindmarsh Stadium, Adelaide |
  | 19:00 ACDT; 21:30 NZDT | T. Dodd 70' | Summary | | Attendance: 10,285; Referee: Jarred Gillett |
  2011–12
  | 19 November 2011 Round 7 | Wellington Phoenix | 1–1 | Adelaide United | Eden Park, Auckland |
  | 17:00 NZDT; 19:30 ACST | N. Boogard 83' (o.g.) | Report; Summary | 44' B. Djite | Attendance: 20,078; Referee: Peter Green |
  | 30 December 2011 Round 14 | Adelaide United | 2–0 | Wellington Phoenix | Hindmarsh Stadium, Adelaide |
  | 19:30 ACDT; 22:00 NZDT | B. Djite 17'; A. Golec 62' | Summary; Report | | Attendance: 9,739; Referee: Chris Beath |
  | 3 February 2012 Round 20 | Adelaide United | 1–2 | Wellington Phoenix | Hindmarsh Stadium, Adelaide |
  | 19:30 ACDT; 22:00 NZDT | B. Djite 9' | Summary; Report | 13' T. Brown; 38' D. Sánchez | Attendance: 8,425; Referee: Gerard Parsons |
  2012–13
  | 27 October 2012 Round 4 | Adelaide United | 3–1 | Wellington Phoenix | Hindmarsh Stadium, Adelaide |
  | 17:00 ACDT; 19:30 NZDT | J. Neumann 55', 84'; Cássio 67' | Report; Summary | 42' S. Huysegems; (red card) 76' B. Sigmund | Attendance: 8,497; Referee: Jarred Gillett |
  | 16 December 2012 Round 11 | Adelaide United | 3–1 | Wellington Phoenix | Hindmarsh Stadium, Adelaide |
  | 16:30 AEDT; 19:00 NZDT | M. Carrusca 19', 24'; F. Ferreira 45+2' | Summary; Report | 81' D. Sánchez | Attendance: 8,657; Referee: Strebre Delovski |
  | 24 February 2013 Round 22 | Wellington Phoenix | 2–2 | Adelaide United | Westpac Stadium, Wellington |
  | 16:30 NZDT; 14:30 AEDT | J. Brockie 31'; C. Gameiro 80' | Summary; Report | (yellow card) 6' (yellow-red card) 68' J. McKain; 20' T. Juric; 34' M. Carrusca | Attendance: 4,832; Referee: Tim McGilchrist |
  2013–14
  | 1 February 2014 Round 17 | Wellington Phoenix | 2–1 | Adelaide United | Eden Park, Auckland |
  | Saturday, 19:30 NZDT; Saturday, 17:00 ACDT | C. Hernández 22'; K. Cunningham 44' | Summary; Report | 90+3' A. Mabil | Attendance: 18,056; Referee: Peter Green |
  | 27 February 2014 Round 21 | Adelaide United | 5–1 | Wellington Phoenix | Coopers Stadium, Adelaide |
  | Thursday, 19:00 ACDT; Sunday, 21:30 NZDT; Rescheduled | Jerónimo 23', 62'; S. Cirio 29'; F. Ferreira 59'; A. Mabil 90+2' | Summary; Report | 67' K. Cunningham; (yellow card) 43' (yellow-red card) 73' M. Muscat | Attendance: 8,596; Referee: Lucien Laverdure |
  | 30 March 2014 Round 25 | Wellington Phoenix | 0–1 | Adelaide United | Westpac Stadium, Wellington |
  | Sunday, 15:00 NZDT; Sunday, 12:30 ACDT | | Summary; Report | 58' (pen.) M. Carrusca | Attendance: 6,453; Referee: Peter Green |
  2014–15
  | 15 November 2014 Round 6 | Adelaide United | 2–1 | Wellington Phoenix | Coopers Stadium, Adelaide |
  | Saturday, 4:30 ACDT; Saturday, 19:00 NZDT | N. Boogaard 37'; S. Cirio 90' | Report | 15' R. Bonevacia | Attendance: 9,726; Referee: Strebre Delovski |
  | 31 December 2014 Round 14 | Adelaide United | 1–3 | Wellington Phoenix | Coopers Stadium, Adelaide |
  | Wednesday, 19:00 ACDT; Wednesday, 21:30 NZDT | S. Cirio 73' | Report | 54' K. Cunningham; 77', 90' T. Boyd | Attendance: 10,060; Referee: Kris Griffiths-Jones |
  | 7 March 2015 Round 20 | Wellington Phoenix | 2–0 | Adelaide United | Hutt Recreation Ground |
  | Saturday 17:00 NZDT | J. Griffiths 79'; N. Burns 82' | Report | | Attendance: 7,819; Referee: Ben Williams |

== Brisbane Roar ==
=== Statistics ===
==== Results summary ====
| Overall | | | | | | | | Home | | | | | | Away | | | | | |
| Pld | W | D | L | GF | GA | GD | Pts | W | D | L | GF | GA | GD | W | D | L | GF | GA | GD |
|---|---|---|---|---|---|---|---|---|---|---|---|---|---|---|---|---|---|---|---|
| 25 | 5 | 5 | 15 | 29 | 44 | −15 | 20 | 4 | 3 | 5 | 17 | 17 | 0 | 1 | 2 | 10 | 12 | 27 | −15 |

==== Leading goal scorers ====
| Rank | Name | Team | Total |
|---|---|---|---|
| 1 | (Albania) Besart Berisha | | 6 |
| 2 | (Brazil) Reinaldo | | 5 |
| 3 | (Netherlands) Sergio van Dijk | | 4 |
| 4 | (New Zealand) Jeremy Brockie | | 3 |
| 4 | (New Zealand) Tim Brown | | 3 |
| 4 | (Belgium) Stein Huysegems | | 3 |
| 4 | (New Zealand) Shane Smeltz | | 3 |

==== Discipline ====
| Team | Yellow card | Yellow-red card | Red card |
|---|---|---|---|
| Wellington Phoenix | 52 | 2 | 2 |
| Brisbane Roar | 35 | 2 | 0 |

=== Matches ===
25 matches
- 2007–08
  | 5 October 2007 Round 7 | Queensland Roar | 2–1 | Wellington Phoenix | Suncorp Stadium, Brisbane |
  | | M. Zullo 4'; R. Kruse 45+1' | Summary | 90+5' S. Smeltz | Attendance: 12,458; Referee: Craig Zetter |
  | 11 November 2007 Round 12 | Queensland Roar | 3–0 | Wellington Phoenix | Suncorp Stadium, Brisbane |
  | | Reinaldo 67' (pen.), 79'; Marcinho 83' | Summary | | Attendance: 13,808; Referee: Matthew Breeze |
  | 14 December 2007 Round 17 | Wellington Phoenix | 1–1 | Queensland Roar | Westpac Stadium, Wellington |
  | | S. Smeltz 24' | Summary | 5' Reinaldo | Attendance: 9,384; Referee: Ben Williams |
  2008–09
  | 17 August 2008 Round 1 | Wellington Phoenix | 1–1 | Queensland Roar | Westpac Stadium, Wellington |
  | | S. Smeltz 51' | Summary | 46' C. Miller | Attendance: 10,561; Referee: Ben Williams |
  | 26 October 2008 Round 9 | Wellington Phoenix | 0–1 | Queensland Roar | Westpac Stadium, Wellington |
  | | | Summary | 40'J. McCloughan | Attendance: 6,543; Referee: Peter O'Leary |
  | 28 December 2008 Round 17 | Queensland Roar | 3–2 | Wellington Phoenix | Suncorp Stadium, Brisbane |
  | | M. McKay 39'; S. van Dijk 48'; T. Oar 90' | Summary | 11' (o.g.) L. DeVere; (yellow card) 37' (yellow-red card) 90' A. Durante; 46' T. Hearfield | Attendance: 13,115; Referee: Ben Williams |
  2009–10
  | 23 August 2009 Round 3 | Brisbane Roar | 1–1 | Wellington Phoenix | Suncorp Stadium, Brisbane |
  | 15:00 AEST; 17:00 NZST | S. van Dijk 10'; T. Oar (yellow card) 86' (yellow-red card) 88' | Report; Summary | 85' C. Greenacre | Attendance: 7,084; Referee: Chris Beath |
  | 29 November 2009 Round 16 | Brisbane Roar | 4–1 | Wellington Phoenix | Suncorp Stadium, Brisbane |
  | 19:00 AEST; 22:00 NZDT | Reinaldo 17', 56'; S. van Dijk 79'; D. Dodd 90+1' | Report; Summary | 27' C. Greenacre; (red card) 58' M. Muscat | Attendance: 6,307; Referee: Alan Milliner |
  | 9 January 2010 Round 21 | Wellington Phoenix | 3–1 | Brisbane Roar | Westpac Stadium, Wellington |
  | 17:00 NZDT; 15:00 AEST | T. Brown 26'; E. Dadi 56', 62' | Report; Summary | 88' S. van Dijk | Attendance: 8,927; Referee: Peter O'Leary |
  2010–11
  | 27 August 2010 Round 3 | Brisbane Roar | 1–0 | Wellington Phoenix | Suncorp Stadium, Brisbane |
  | 20:00 AEST; 22:00 NZST | K. Barbarouses 73' | Summary | | Attendance: 7,339; Referee: Chris Beath |
  | 3 November 2010 Round 12 | Wellington Phoenix | 1–4 | Brisbane Roar | Westpac Stadium, Wellington |
  | 19:30 NZDT; 16:30 AEST | T. Brown 37' | Summary | 4' K. Barbarouses; 45'T. Broich; 76' M. Murdocca; 90+2' M. Nichols | Attendance: 5,529; Referee: Peter O'Leary |
  | 26 January 2011 Round 26 | Brisbane Roar | 2–0 | Wellington Phoenix | Skilled Park, Gold Coast |
  | 17:00 AEST; 20:00 NZDT | J. Meyer 85', 90' | Summary | | Attendance: 3,522; Referee: Ryan Shepheard |
  2011–12
  | 13 November 2011 Round 6 | Brisbane Roar | 1–1 | Wellington Phoenix | Suncorp Stadium, Brisbane |
  | 19:00 NZDT; 17:00 AEDT | B. Berisha 11' | Report; Summary | 37' T. Brown | Attendance: 16,428; Referee: Jarred Gillett |
  | 14 December 2011 Round 11 | Wellington Phoenix | 2–0 | Brisbane Roar | Forsyth Barr Stadium, Dunedin |
  | 19:30 NZDT; 17:30 AEDT | P. Ifill 26'; N. Ward 80' | Summary; Report | | Attendance: 4,628; Referee: Gerard Parsons |
  | 12 February 2012 Round 21 | Wellington Phoenix | 0–2 | Brisbane Roar | Westpac Stadium, Wellington |
  | 17:00 NZDT; 15:00 AEDT | | Summary; Report | 42' B. Berisha; 80' M. Nichols | Attendance: 13,009; Referee: Jarred Gillett |
  2012–13
  | 21 October 2012 Round 3 | Wellington Phoenix | 1–1 | Brisbane Roar | Westpac Stadium, Wellington |
  | | S. Huysegems 16' | Summary; Report | 39' B. Berisha | Attendance: 9,182; Referee: Adam Kersey |
  | 1 January 2013 Round 14 | Brisbane Roar | 2–1 | Wellington Phoenix | Suncorp Stadium, Brisbane |
  | 19:30 AEST; 22:30 NZDT | B. Berisha 14'; J. Donachie (yellow card) 40' (yellow-red card) 85'; B. Halloran 59' | Summary; Report | (yellow card) 45' (yellow-red card) 64' T. Boyd; 37' J. Brockie | Attendance: 11,358; Referee: Tim McGilchrist |
  | 17 February 2013 Round 21 | Brisbane Roar | 2–0 | Wellington Phoenix | Suncorp Stadium, Brisbane |
  | 17:00 AEDT; 19:00 NZDT | S. Lustica 33'; B. Berisha 49' | Summary; Report | | Attendance: 9,282; Referee: Alan Milliner |
  2013–14
  | 13 October 2013 Round 1 | Wellington Phoenix | 1–2 | Brisbane Roar | Westpac Stadium, Wellington |
  | Sunday, 17:00 NZDT; Sunday, 14:00 AEST | S. Huysegems 22' | Summary; Report | 47' B. Berisha; 90' I. Franjic | Attendance: 8,239; Referee: Tim McGilchrist |
  | 14 December 2013 Round 10 | Wellington Phoenix | 1–2 | Brisbane Roar | Westpac Stadium, Wellington |
  | Saturday, 17:30 NZDT; Saturday, 14:30 AEST | C. Hernández 48' (pen.) | Summary; Report | 37' M. Smith; 74' I. Franjić | Attendance: 6,374; Referee: Shaun Evans |
  | 24 January 2014 Round 16 | Brisbane Roar | 2–1 | Wellington Phoenix | Suncorp Stadium, Brisbane |
  | Friday, 19:00 AEST; Friday, 22:00 NZDT | D. Clut 50'; L. Brattan 87' | Summary; Report | 36' S. Huysegems | Attendance: 13,889; Referee: Chris Beath |
  2014–15
  | 4 January 2015 Round 14 | Wellington Phoenix | 3–0 | Brisbane Roar | Westpac Stadium, Wellington |
  | Sunday, 17:00 NZDT; Sunday, 14:00 AEST | M. Muscat 4'; J. Brockie 51' (pen.), 67' | Report | | Attendance: 10,267; Referee: Stephen Lucas |
  | 1 February 2015 Round 15 | Brisbane Roar | 3–2 | Wellington Phoenix | Suncorp Stadium, Brisbane |
  | Sunday, 14:00 AEST; Sunday, 17:00 NZDT | J. Donachie 60'; B. Borrello 76'; Solórzano 90' | Report | 50' R. Krishna; 81' K. Cunningham | Attendance: 9,263; Referee: Alan Milliner |
  | 22 March 2015 Round 22 | Brisbane Roar | 1–2 | Wellington Phoenix | Suncorp Stadium, Brisbane |
  | Saturday, 16:00 AEST; Saturday, 19:00 NZDT; Match was abandoned after 73 minutes due to severe weather conditions. | A. Kaluđerović 5' | Report | 20' M. McGlinchey; 45' N. Burns | Attendance: 10,075; Referee: Alan Milliner |
  2015–16
  | 24 October 2015 Round 3 | Wellington Phoenix | 3–2 | Brisbane Roar | Westpac Stadium, Wellington |
  | Saturday, 19:15 NZDT; Saturday, 16:15 AEST | M. McGlinchey 35'; R. Krishna 49'; B. Powell 78' | Report; Summary | 26' D. Petratos; 60' J. North | Attendance: 6,103; Referee: Jarred Gillett |

== Central Coast Mariners ==
=== Statistics ===
==== Results summary ====
| Overall | | | | | | | | Home | | | | | | Away | | | | | |
| Pld | W | D | L | GF | GA | GD | Pts | W | D | L | GF | GA | GD | W | D | L | GF | GA | GD |
|---|---|---|---|---|---|---|---|---|---|---|---|---|---|---|---|---|---|---|---|
| 23 | 7 | 5 | 11 | 21 | 29 | −8 | 26 | 3 | 5 | 5 | 12 | 13 | −1 | 4 | 0 | 6 | 9 | 16 | −7 |

==== Leading goal scorers ====
| Rank | Name | Team | Total |
|---|---|---|---|
| 1 | (Barbados) Paul Ifill | | 5 |
| 2 | (Costa Rica) Kenny Cunningham | | 4 |
| 2 | (Australia) Bernie Ibini | | 4 |
| 3 | (Australia) Adam Kwasnik | | 3 |
| 3 | (Australia) Daniel McBreen | | 3 |
| 3 | (Australia) Matt Simon | | 3 |

==== Discipline ====
| Team | Yellow card | Yellow-red card | Red card |
|---|---|---|---|
| Wellington Phoenix | 42 | 0 | 0 |
| Central Coast Mariners | 47 | 0 | 0 |

=== Matches ===
24 matches
- 2007–08
  | 31 August 2007 Round 2 | Central Coast Mariners | 3–0 | Wellington Phoenix | Bluetongue Stadium, Gosford |
  | | N. Mrdja 9', 35'; A. Kwasnik 13' | Summary | | Attendance: 9,052; Referee: Peter Green |
  | 21 October 2007 Round 9 | Wellington Phoenix | 1–2 | Central Coast Mariners | Westpac Stadium, Wellington |
  | | A. Elrich 24' | Summary | 16' D. Heffernan; 90+1' S. Petrovski | Attendance: 10,562; Referee: Peter Green |
  | 19 January 2008 Round 21 | Central Coast Mariners | 2–0 | Wellington Phoenix | Bluetongue Stadium, Gosford |
  | | J. Aloisi 52'; A. Kwasnik 90+4' | Summary | | Attendance: 9,849; Referee: Kevin Docherty |
  2008–09
  | 14 September 2008 Round 4 | Wellington Phoenix | 0–0 | Central Coast Mariners | Westpac Stadium, Wellington |
  | | | Summary | | Attendance: 6,928; Referee: Strebre Delovski |
  | 19 October 2008 Round 8 | Central Coast Mariners | 0–1 | Wellington Phoenix | Bluetongue Stadium, Gosford |
  | | | Summary | 53' K. Dodd | Attendance: 9,011; Referee: Ben Williams |
  | 19 December 2008 Round 16 | Wellington Phoenix | 1–0 | Central Coast Mariners | Westpac Stadium, Wellington |
  | | Smeltz 2' | Summary | | Attendance: 6,722; Referee: Chris Beath |
  2009–10
  | 27 September 2009 Round 8 | Wellington Phoenix | 0–0 | Central Coast Mariners | Westpac Stadium, Wellington |
  | 16:00 NZDT; 13:00 AEST | | Report; Summary | | Attendance: 6,769; Referee: Michael Hester |
  | 31 December 2009 Round 20 | Central Coast Mariners | 0–2 | Wellington Phoenix | Bluetongue Stadium, Gosford |
  | 18:00 AEDT; 20:00 NZDT | | Report; Summary | 47' (pen.), 81' P. Ifill | Attendance: 11,137; Referee: Matthew Breeze |
  | 12 February 2010 Round 27 | Wellington Phoenix | 3–0 | Central Coast Mariners | Westpac Stadium, Wellington |
  | 17:30 NZDT; 15:30 AEDT | T. Brown 14'; P. Ifill 79', 81' | Report; Summary | | Attendance: 14,327; Referee: Chris Beath |
  2010–11
  | 22 August 2010 Round 2 | Wellington Phoenix | 2–0 | Central Coast Mariners | Westpac Stadium, Wellington |
  | 15:00 NZST; 13:00 AEST | L. Bertos 10'; P. Ifill 61' | Summary | | Attendance: 9,553; Referee: Peter O'Leary |
  | 13 November 2010 Round 14 | Wellington Phoenix | 0–3 | Central Coast Mariners | Westpac Stadium, Wellington |
  | 19:30 NZDT; 17:30 AEDT | | Summary | 17', 80' J. Rose; 86' A. Kwasnik | Attendance: 5,778; Referee: Peter Green |
  | 9 January 2011 Round 24 | Central Coast Mariners | 1–0 | Wellington Phoenix | Bluetongue Stadium, Gosford |
  | 17:00 AEDT; 19:00 NZDT | M. McGlinchey 41' | Report; Summary | | Attendance: 6,844; Referee: Matthew Breeze |
  2011–12
  | 4 November 2011 Round 5 | Wellington Phoenix | 1–2 | Central Coast Mariners | Westpac Stadium, Wellington |
  | 19:30 NZDT; 17:30 AEDT | C. Greenacre 68' | Report; Summary | 47' B. Ibini; 80' M. Simon | Attendance: 5,090; Referee: Gerard Parsons |
  | 18 February 2012 Round 22 | Central Coast Mariners | 2–0 | Wellington Phoenix | Bluetongue Stadium, Central Coast |
  | 17:30 AEDT; 19:30 NZDT | T. Rogic 52'; P. Zwaanwijk 83' | Summary; Report | | Attendance: 7,845; Referee: Strebre Delovski |
  | 25 March 2012 Round 27 | Wellington Phoenix | 1–2 | Central Coast Mariners | Westpac Stadium, Wellington |
  | 16:00 NZDT; 14:00 AEDT | L. Bertos 80' | Summary; Report | 45' J. Sutton; 51' B. Ibini | Attendance: 9,740; Referee: Strebre Delovski |
  2012–13
  | 11 November 2012 Round 6 | Wellington Phoenix | 0–1 | Central Coast Mariners | Westpac Stadium, Wellington |
  | 16:30 NZDT; 14:30 AEDT | | Summary | 67' D. McBreen | Attendance: 6,568; Referee: Lucien Laverdure |
  | 22 December 2012 Round 12 | Wellington Phoenix | 1–1 | Central Coast Mariners | Westpac Stadium, Wellington |
  | 17:00 NZDT; 15:00 AEDT | D. Sánchez 84' | Summary; Report | 45' D. McBreen | Attendance: 5,961; Referee: Peter O'Leary |
  | 7 February 2013 Round 20 | Central Coast Mariners | 5–0 | Wellington Phoenix | Bluetongue Stadium, Gosford |
  | 19:00 AEDT; 21:00 NZDT | B. Ibini 30', 86'; J. Hutchinson 65'; D. McBreen 69'; M. Duke 89' | Summary; Report | | Attendance: 6,774; Referee: Kris Griffiths-Jones |
  2013–14
  | 19 December 2013 Round 6 | Central Coast Mariners | 1–0 | Wellington Phoenix | North Sydney Oval, Sydney |
  | Thursday, 19:30 AEDT; Thursday, 21:30 NZDT | S. Roux 27' | Summary; Report | | Attendance: 6,755; Referee: Kris Griffiths-Jones |
  | 12 January 2014 Round 14 | Wellington Phoenix | 1–1 | Central Coast Mariners | Westpac Stadium, Wellington |
  | Sunday, 19:00 NZDT; Sunday, 17:00 AEDT | K. Cunningham 45' | Summary; Report | 16' M. Simon | Attendance: 7,005; Referee: Matthew Gillett |
  | 21 February 2014 Round 20 | Central Coast Mariners | 1–4 | Wellington Phoenix | Central Coast Stadium, Gosford |
  | Friday, 19:30 AEDT; Friday, 21:30 NZDT | B. Ibini 20' | Summary; Report | 47' K. Cunningham; 64' C. Hernández; 65' S. Huysegems; 82' J. Brockie | Attendance: 6,147; Referee: Alan Milliner |
  2014–15
  | 18 October 2014 Round 2 | Central Coast Mariners | 1–2 | Wellington Phoenix | Central Coast Stadium, Gosford |
  | Sunday, 17:00 AEDT; Sunday, 19:00 NZDT | T. Doyle 12' (o.g.) | Report | 35' M. McGlinchey; 54' N. Burns | Attendance: 7,237; Referee: Ben Williams |
  | 13 December 2014 Round 11 | Wellington Phoenix | 1–1 | Central Coast Mariners | Westpac Stadium, Wellington |
  | Saturday, 17:00 NZDT; Saturday, 15:00 AEDT | R. Krishna 76' | Report | 40' M. Simon | Attendance: 11,051; Referee: Alan Milliner |
  | 17 April 2015 Round 26 | Wellington Phoenix | 3–2 | Central Coast Mariners | Westpac Stadium, Wellington |
  | Friday, 19:30 NZST; Friday, 17:30 AEST | R. Bonevacia 65'; K. Cunningham 79', 90+5' | Report | 11' N. Fitzgerald; 35' E. Bosnar | Attendance: 6,868; Referee: Peter O'Leary |

== Gold Coast United ==
=== Statistics ===
==== Results summary ====
| Overall | | | | | | | | Home | | | | | | Away | | | | | |
| Pld | W | D | L | GF | GA | GD | Pts | W | D | L | GF | GA | GD | W | D | L | GF | GA | GD |
|---|---|---|---|---|---|---|---|---|---|---|---|---|---|---|---|---|---|---|---|
| 9 | 4 | 3 | 2 | 15 | 9 | +6 | 15 | 2 | 1 | 0 | 11 | 3 | +8 | 2 | 2 | 2 | 4 | 6 | −2 |

==== Leading goal scorers ====
| Rank | Name | Team | Total |
|---|---|---|---|
| 1 | (England) Chris Greenacre | | 4 |
| 1 | (Barbados) Paul Ifill | | 4 |
| 3 | (Australia) James Brown | | 3 |
| 4 | (New Zealand) Tim Brown | | 2 |
| 4 | (Brazil) Daniel | | 2 |
| 4 | (Australia) Bruce Djite | | 2 |
| 4 | (New Zealand) Shane Smeltz | | 2 |

==== Discipline ====
| Team | Yellow card | Yellow-red card | Red card |
|---|---|---|---|
| Wellington Phoenix | 19 | 0 | 0 |
| Gold Coast United | 17 | 0 | 0 |

=== Matches ===
9 matches
- 2009–10
  | 2 October 2009 Round 9 | Gold Coast United | 0–0 | Wellington Phoenix | Skilled Park, Gold Coast |
  | 20:00 AEST; 23:00 NZDT | | Report; Summary | | Attendance: 4,209; Referee: Gerard Parsons |
  | 25 October 2009 Round 11 | Wellington Phoenix | 6–0 | Gold Coast United | Westpac Stadium, Wellington |
  | 17:00 NZDT; 14:00 AEST | Daniel 28', 53'; T. Brown 48'; C. Greenacre 54'; P. Ifill 59'; T. Hearfield 82' | Report; Summary | | Attendance: 6,571; Referee: Chris Beath |
  | 7 February 2010 Round 26 | Gold Coast United | 0–1 | Wellington Phoenix | Skilled Park, Gold Coast |
  | 18:00 AEST; 21:00 NZDT | | Report; Summary | 45+2' (pen.) P. Ifill | Attendance: 4,202; Referee: Matthew Breeze |
  2010–11
  | 13 August 2010 Round 1 | Wellington Phoenix | 3–3 | Gold Coast United | Westpac Stadium, Wellington |
  | 17:30 NZST; 15:30 AEST | P. Ifill 7'; C. Greenacre 38', 56' | Summary | 36', 75' S. Smeltz; 87' J. Culina | Attendance: 8,938; Referee: Peter O'Leary |
  | 1 October 2010 Round 9 | Gold Coast United | 3–1 | Wellington Phoenix | Skilled Park, Gold Coast |
  | 20:00 AEST; 23:00 NZDT | B. Djite 6', 70'; J. Brown 82' | Summary | 9' (pen.) P. Ifill | Attendance: 2,943; Referee: Matthew Gillett |
  | 11 December 2010 Round 20 | Gold Coast United | 2–0 | Wellington Phoenix | Skilled Park, Gold Coast |
  | 20:15 AEST; 23:15 NZDT | B. van den Brink 22'; J. Brown 67' | Report; Summary | | Attendance: 1,716; Referee: Alan Milliner |
  2011–12
  | 9 October 2011 Round 1 | Gold Coast United | 1–1 | Wellington Phoenix | Skilled Park, Gold Coast |
  | 16:00 AEDT; 19:00 NZDT | J. Brown 87' | Report; Summary | 17' C. Greenacre | Attendance: 4,113; Referee: Gerard Parsons |
  | 15 January 2012 Round 17 | Gold Coast United | 0–1 | Wellington Phoenix | Skilled Park, Gold Coast |
  | 18:30 AEDT; 20:30 NZDT | | Summary; Report | 87' T. Brown | Attendance: 2,135; Referee: Kurt Ams |
  | 4 March 2012 Round 24 | Wellington Phoenix | 2–0 | Gold Coast United | Westpac Stadium, Wellington |
  | 16:30 NZDT; 19:30 AEST | A. Durante 29'; N. Ward 90+2' | Summary; Report | | Attendance: 7,431; Referee: Kris Griffiths-Jones |

== Melbourne City ==
At the conclusion of the 2013/14 season, Melbourne Heart was re-branded to Melbourne City and changed their colours from red and white to blue and white.

=== Statistics ===
==== Results summary ====
| Overall | | | | | | | | Home | | | | | | Away | | | | | |
| Pld | W | D | L | GF | GA | GD | Pts | W | D | L | GF | GA | GD | W | D | L | GF | GA | GD |
|---|---|---|---|---|---|---|---|---|---|---|---|---|---|---|---|---|---|---|---|
| 16 | 6 | 6 | 4 | 22 | 20 | +2 | 24 | 5 | 2 | 2 | 16 | 13 | +3 | 1 | 4 | 2 | 6 | 7 | −1 |

==== Leading goal scorers ====
| Rank | Name | Team | Total |
|---|---|---|---|
| 1 | (Barbados) Paul Ifill | | 6 |
| 2 | (Australia) David Williams | (4) (1) | 5 |
| 3 | (New Zealand) Jeremy Brockie | | 3 |
| 3 | (Australia) Nathan Burns | | 3 |
| 4 | (Australia) John Aloisi | | 2 |
| 4 | (England) Chris Greenacre | | 2 |
| 4 | (Brazil) Alex Terra | | 2 |
| 4 | (Australia) Matt Thompson | | 2 |

==== Discipline ====
| Team | Yellow card | Yellow-red card | Red card |
|---|---|---|---|
| Wellington Phoenix | 25 | 2 | 0 |
| Melbourne City | 30 | 1 | 1 |

=== Matches ===
16 matches
- 2010–11
  | 19 September 2010 Round 7 | Melbourne Heart | 2–1 | Wellington Phoenix | AAMI Park, Melbourne |
  | 15:00 AEST; 17:00 NZST | J. Aloisi 50'; A. Terra 66' | Summary | 75' T. Brown | Referee: Peter Green |
  | 17 October 2010 Round 10 | Wellington Phoenix | 2–2 | Melbourne Heart | Westpac Stadium, Wellington |
  | 17:00 NZDT; 15:00 AEDT | C. Greenacre 6'; L. Bertos 59' | Summary | 14' (pen.) J. Aloisi; 36' M. Thompson | Attendance: 5,211; Referee: Matthew Breeze |
  | 24 November 2010 Round 16 | Wellington Phoenix | 2–0 | Melbourne Heart | Westpac Stadium, Wellington |
  | 19:00 NZDT; 17:00 AEDT | P. Ifill 62', 73' | Summary | (yellow card) 58' (yellow-red card) 71' M. Thompson | Attendance: 4,700; Referee: Jarred Gillett |
  2011–12
  | 4 December 2011 Round 9 | Melbourne Heart | 1–0 | Wellington Phoenix | Latrobe City Stadium, Morwell |
  | 15:00 AEDT; 17:00 NZDT | M. Dugandzic 40' | Summary; Report | | Attendance: 2,951; Referee: Ben Williams |
  | 29 January 2012 Round 19 | Wellington Phoenix | 3–1 | Melbourne Heart | Westpac Stadium, Wellington |
  | 16:30 NZDT; 18:30 AEDT | P. Ifill 3', 64'; C. Greenacre 54' | Summary; Report | 34' A. Terra | Attendance: 13,601; Referee: Peter Green |
  | 10 March 2012 Round 25 | Melbourne Heart | 1–1 | Wellington Phoenix | AAMI Park, Melbourne |
  | 17:30 AEDT; 19:30 NZDT | E .Babalj 32' | Summary; Report | 80' P. Ifill | Attendance: 6,759; Referee: Peter Green |
  2012–13
  | 14 October 2012 Round 2 | Melbourne Heart | 1–1 | Wellington Phoenix | AAMI Park, Melbourne |
  | 15:00 AEDT; 17:00 NZDT | M. Thompson 21'; S. Colosimo (red card) 47' | Summary; Report | 48' (pen.) P. Ifill | Attendance: 10,907; Referee: Kris Griffiths-Jones |
  | 27 December 2012 Round 13 | Wellington Phoenix | 3–2 | Melbourne Heart | Westpac Stadium, Wellington |
  | 19:30 NZDT; 17:30 AEDT | L. Fenton 21'; J. Brockie 66' (pen.), 71' | Summary; Report | 14' G. Mebrahtu; 16' (o.g.) A. Durante | Attendance: 6,401; Referee: Shaun Evans |
  | 3 March 2013 Round 23 | Wellington Phoenix | 1–0 | Melbourne Heart | Forsyth Barr Stadium, Dunedin |
  | 16:30 NZDT; 14:30 AEDT | J. Brockie 19'; S. Huysegems (yellow card) 45' (yellow-red card) 85' | Summary; Report | | Attendance: 3,060; Referee: Brenton Hayward |
  2013–14
  | 27 December 2013 Round 12 | Melbourne Heart | 0–1 | Wellington Phoenix | AAMI Park, Melbourne |
  | Friday, 19:30 AEDT; Friday, 21:30 NZDT | | Summary; Report | 75' S. Huysegems | Attendance: 6,486; Referee: Strebre Delovski |
  | 16 February 2014 Round 19 | Wellington Phoenix | 0–5 | Melbourne Heart | Westpac Stadium, Wellington |
  | Sunday, 17:00 NZDT; Sunday, 15:00 AEDT | | Summary; Report | 9' O. Engelaar; 19', 51', 63' D. Williams; 54' R. Wielaert | Attendance: 9,767; Referee: Jarred Gillett |
  | 16 March 2014 Round 23 | Melbourne Heart | 2–2 | Wellington Phoenix | AAMI Park, Melbourne |
  | Sunday, 17:00 AEDT; Sunday, 19:00 NZDT | J. Germano 29'; D. Williams 62' (pen.) | Summary; Report | 6' R. Krishna; (yellow card) 31' (yellow-red card) 33' B. Sigmund; 56' T. Boyd | Attendance: 5,614; Referee: Ben Williams |
  2014–15
  | 30 November 2014 Round 8 | Wellington Phoenix | 5–1 | Melbourne City | Westpac Stadium, Wellington |
  | Sunday, 17:00 NZDT; Sunday, 15:00 AEDT | N. Burns 34', 47', 85' (pen.); R. Bonevacia 40'; R. Krishna 50' | Report | 68' (pen.) D. Williams | Attendance: 7,410; Referee: Jarred Gillett |
  | 14 February 2015 Round 18 | Wellington Phoenix | 0–0 | Melbourne City | Hutt Recreation Ground, Wellington |
  | Saturday | | Report | | Attendance: 9,232; Referee: Chris Beath |
  | 12 April 2015 Round 26 | Melbourne City | 0–0 | Wellington Phoenix | AAMI Park, Melbourne |
  | Sunday, 17:00 AEST; Sunday, 19:00 NZST | | Report | | Attendance: 6,720; Referee: Peter Green |
  | 3 May 2015 Elim. Final | Wellington Phoenix | 0–2 | Melbourne City | Westpac Stadium, Wellington |
  | | | Report | 61' J. Kennedy; 72' (o.g.) G. Moss | Attendance: 10,171; Referee: Ben Williams |

== Melbourne Victory ==
=== Statistics ===
==== Results summary ====
| Overall | | | | | | | | Home | | | | | | Away | | | | | |
| Pld | W | D | L | GF | GA | GD | Pts | W | D | L | GF | GA | GD | W | D | L | GF | GA | GD |
|---|---|---|---|---|---|---|---|---|---|---|---|---|---|---|---|---|---|---|---|
| 24 | 4 | 6 | 14 | 30 | 51 | −21 | 18 | 3 | 3 | 5 | 20 | 22 | −2 | 1 | 3 | 9 | 10 | 29 | −19 |

==== Leading goal scorers ====
| Rank | Name | Team | Total |
|---|---|---|---|
| 1 | (Australia) Archie Thompson | | 9 |
| 2 | (Costa Rica) Carlos Hernández | (5) (2) | 7 |
| 3 | (New Zealand) Jeremy Brockie | | 6 |
| 4 | (Australia) Danny Allsopp | | 5 |
| 4 | (New Zealand) Marco Rojas | (4) (1) | 5 |

==== Discipline ====
| Team | Yellow card | Yellow-red card | Red card |
|---|---|---|---|
| Wellington Phoenix | 48 | 0 | 2 |
| Melbourne Victory | 44 | 3 | 0 |

=== Matches ===
24 matches
- 2007–08
  | 26 August 2007 Round 1 | Wellington Phoenix | 2–2 | Melbourne Victory | Westpac Stadium, Wellington |
  | | Daniel 79'; S. Smeltz 84' | Summary | 19' (pen.) K. Muscat; 60' D. Allsopp | Attendance: 14,421; Referee: Mark Shield |
  | 24 November 2007 Round 14 | Melbourne Victory | 1–1 | Wellington Phoenix | Etihad Stadium, Melbourne |
  | | K. Muscat (yellow card) 34' (yellow-red card) 45'; D. Allsopp 43' | Summary | 58' V. Lia | Attendance: 20,938; Referee: Peter Green |
  | 11 January 2008 Round 20 | Melbourne Victory | 3–0 | Wellington Phoenix | Etihad Stadium, Melbourne |
  | | C. Hernández 31'; N. Ward 35'; K. Patafta 88' | Summary | | Attendance: 25,489; Referee: Peter Green |
  2008–09
  | 24 August 2008 Round 2 | Wellington Phoenix | 2–4 | Melbourne Victory | Westpac Stadium, Wellington |
  | | S. Smeltz 29', 65' (pen.) | Summary | 16', 35' D. Allsopp; 68' (pen.) K. Muscat | Attendance: 6,110; Referee: Strebre Delovski |
  | 28 November 2008 Round 13 | Wellington Phoenix | 2–1 | Melbourne Victory | Westpac Stadium, Wellington |
  | | T. Brown 22'; S. Smeltz 58' | Summary | 20' D. Allsopp | Attendance: 7,953; Referee: Craig Zetter |
  | 23 January 2009 Round 21 | Melbourne Victory | 2–0 | Wellington Phoenix | Etihad Stadium, Melbourne |
  | | K. Muscat 40' (pen.); A. Thompson 89' | Summary | | Attendance: 28,905; Referee: Strebre Delovski |
  2009–10
  | 13 September 2009 Round 6 | Melbourne Victory | 1–1 | Wellington Phoenix | Etihad Stadium, Melbourne |
  | 17:00 AEST; 19:00 NZST | C. Hernández 4' | Report; Summary | 30' T. Brown | Attendance: 17,644; Referee: Craig Zetter |
  | 4 December 2009 Round 17 | Wellington Phoenix | 1–1 | Melbourne Victory | Westpac Stadium, Wellington |
  | 17:30 NZDT; 19:30 AEDT | T. Brown 58' | Summary | (yellow card) 25' (yellow-red card) 40' N. Ward; 87' R. Vargas | Attendance: 8,206; Referee: Michael Hester |
  | 26 January 2010 Round 24 | Melbourne Victory | 4–0 | Wellington Phoenix | Etihad Stadium, Melbourne |
  | 18:00 AEDT; 20:00 NZDT | T. Brown 17' (o.g.); A. Thompson 50'; C. Hernández 66'; M. Kemp 87' | Report; Summary | | Attendance: 18,819; Referee: Chris Beath |
  2010–11
  | 15 September 2010 Round 6 | Melbourne Victory | 0–0 | Wellington Phoenix | AAMI Park, Melbourne |
  | 21:30 NZST; 19:30 AEST | | Summary | | Attendance: 11,571; Referee: Ben Williams |
  | 27 November 2010 Round 17 | Wellington Phoenix | 2–2 | Melbourne Victory | Westpac Stadium, Wellington |
  | 18:00 NZDT; 16:00 AEDT | T. Brown 18'; P. Ifill 84' | Summary | 21' A. Thompson; 40' R. Kruse | Attendance: 6,475; Referee: Peter O'Leary |
  | 5 January 2011 Round 23 | Wellington Phoenix | 2–0 | Melbourne Victory | Westpac Stadium, Wellington |
  | 19:30 NZDT; 17:30 AEDT | D. Macallister 67'; M. Rojas 72' | Summary | | Attendance: 9,456; Referee: Chris Beath |
  2011–12
  | 30 October 2011 Round 4 | Wellington Phoenix | 1–2 | Melbourne Victory | Westpac Stadium, Wellington |
  | 16:30 NZDT; 14:30 AEDT | Ben Sigmund (red card) 66'; D. Sánchez 71' | Summary; Report | 42' A. Thompson; 67' (pen.) C. Hernández | Attendance: 9,369; Referee: Peter Green |
  | 18 December 2011 Round 12 | Melbourne Victory | 3–1 | Wellington Phoenix | AAMI Park, Melbourne |
  | 17:00 AEDT; 19:00 NZDT | A. Thompson 3'; B. Celeski (yellow card) 19' (yellow-red card) 79'; V. Lia 22' (o.g.); D. Ferreira 24' | Summary; Report | 84' A. Smith | Attendance: 14,023; Referee: Matthew Gillett |
  | 16 March 2012 Round 26 | Melbourne Victory | 3–0 | Wellington Phoenix | AAMI Park, Melbourne |
  | 20:00 AEDT; 22:00 NZDT | C. Hernández 11'; I. Cernak 58'; J. Jeggo 89' | Summary; Report | | Attendance: 11,231; Referee: Chris Beath |
  2012–13
  | 5 November 2012 Round 5 | Melbourne Victory | 3–2 | Wellington Phoenix | Etihad Stadium, Melbourne |
  | 19:30 AEDT; 21:30 NZDT | M. Rojas 23', 49'; M. Flores 38' | Summary; Report | 81', 90' J. Brockie | Attendance: 20,683; Referee: Shaun Evans |
  | 5 January 2013 Round 15 | Melbourne Victory | 2–0 | Wellington Phoenix | AAMI Park, Melbourne |
  | 19:45 AEDT; 21:45 NZDT | M. Flores 42'; M. Rojas 52' | Summary; Report | | Attendance: 18,609; Referee: Ben Williams |
  | 31 March 2013 Round 27 | Wellington Phoenix | 2–3 | Melbourne Victory | Westpac Stadium, Wellington |
  | 16:30 NZDT; 14:30 AEDT | S. Huysegems 64'; J. Brockie 66' | Summary; Report | 10' M. Rojas; 56' M. Flores; 83' A. Thompson | Attendance: 6,813; Referee: Adam Kersey |
  2013–14
  | 4 November 2013 Round 4 | Melbourne Victory | 3–2 | Wellington Phoenix | Etihad Stadium, Melbourne |
  | Monday, 19:30 AEDT; Monday, 21:30 NZDT | A. Thompson 9'; J. Troisi 22', 31' | Summary; Report | 37' J. Brockie; 85' P. Ifill | Attendance: 23,226; Referee: Matthew Gillett |
  | 18 January 2014 Round 15 | Wellington Phoenix | 5–0 | Melbourne Victory | Westpac Stadium, Wellington |
  | Saturday, 19:00 NZDT; Saturday, 17:00 AEDT | C. Hernández 21', 45+2' (pen.); K. Cunningham 45+1'; J. Brockie 85'; S. Huysegems 87' | Summary; Report | | Attendance: 6,813; Referee: Adam Kersey |
  | 12 April 2014 Round 27 | Wellington Phoenix | 1–4 | Melbourne Victory | Westpac Stadium, Wellington |
  | Saturday, 17:30 NZDT; Saturday, 15:30 AEDT | S. Timmins (red card) 57'; J. Brockie 90+3' | Summary; Report | 1' A. Thompson; 29' J. Troisi; 45' G. Finkler; 59' (pen.) M. Milligan | Attendance: 5,336; Referee: Chris Beath |
  2014–15
  | 3 November 2014 Round 4 | Melbourne Victory | 2–0 | Wellington Phoenix | AAMI Park, Melbourne |
  | Monday, 19:30 AEDT; Monday, 21:30 NZDT | G. Finkler 24'; C. Pain 68' | Report | | Attendance: 23,827; Referee: Shaun Evans |
  | 1 March 2015 Round 19 | Melbourne Victory | 2–3 | Wellington Phoenix | AAMI Park, Melbourne |
  | Sunday, 17:00 AEDT; Sunday, 19:00 NZDT | S. Galloway 34'; K. Barbarouses 53' | Report | 42' R. Bonevacia; 68' M. Boxall; 77' N. Burns | Attendance: 22,096; Referee: Jarred Gillett |
  | 5 April 2015 Round 24 | Wellington Phoenix | 0–3 | Melbourne Victory | Westpac Stadium, Wellington |
  | Sunday, 19:00 NZST; Sunday, 17:00 AEST | | Report | 1' G. Finkler; 59' (o.g.) A. Durante; 66' A. Thompson | Attendance: 8,417; Referee: Kris Griffiths-Jones |
