= Carlos Hernández (footballer, born 1982) =

Costa Rican footballer

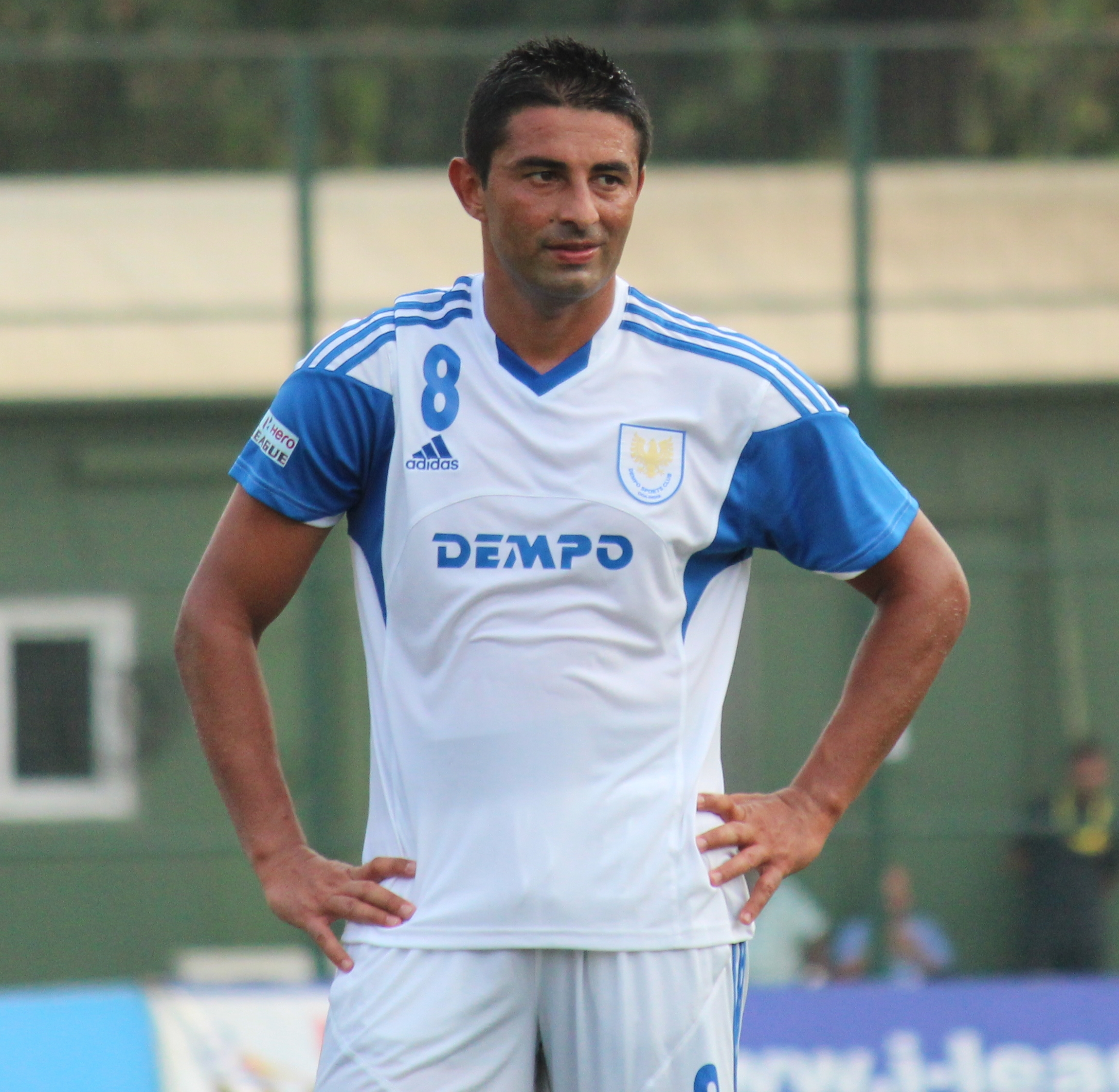
- Hernández with Dempo in 2015

Personal information
- Full name: Carlos Gerardo Hernández Valverde
- Date of birth: 9 April 1982 (age 44)
- Place of birth: San José, Costa Rica
- Height: 1.70 m (5 ft 7 in)
- Position: Attacking midfielder

Youth career
- Alajuelense

Senior career*
| Years | Team | Apps | (Gls) |
| 2001–2009 | Alajuelense | 82 | (19) |
| 2007–2009 | → Melbourne Victory (loan) | 41 | (8) |
| 2009–2012 | Melbourne Victory | 80 | (28) |
| 2011 | → Limón (loan) | 1 | (0) |
| 2012–2013 | Prayag United | 16 | (4) |
| 2013–2014 | Wellington Phoenix | 21 | (7) |
| 2014–2015 | Cartaginés | 11 | (3) |
| 2015 | Dempo | 10 | (2) |
| 2015 | Municipal | 15 | (3) |
| 2016–2017 | Carmelita | 50 | (7) |
| 2017 | Pérez Zeledón | 2 | (0) |
| 2017 | Liberia | 13 | (2) |
| 2018–2019 | Puntarenas | 0 | (0) |
| Total | | 342 | (83) |

International career
| 2001 | Costa Rica U-20 | 4 | (2) |
| 2004 | Costa Rica U-23 | 11 | (6) |
| 2004–2014 | Costa Rica | 40 | (7) |
- * Club domestic league appearances and goals

Carlos Gerardo Hernández Valverde (born 9 April 1982), known simply as Carlos Hernández, is a former Costa Rican football player who last played as an attacking midfielder.

Hernández is Melbourne Victory's all-time top scoring midfielder, with 39 goals in all competitions.

== Club career ==
Hernández played in the Primera División de Costa Rica, where he recorded the most assists during the 2004–05 and 2005–06 seasons. He was noted for his long-distance scoring and passing ability.

However, Hernández struggled with injury in the 2006–07 season which also resulted in weight gain. In a bid to regain his former self, he was loaned out to A-League club Melbourne Victory.

=== Melbourne Victory ===
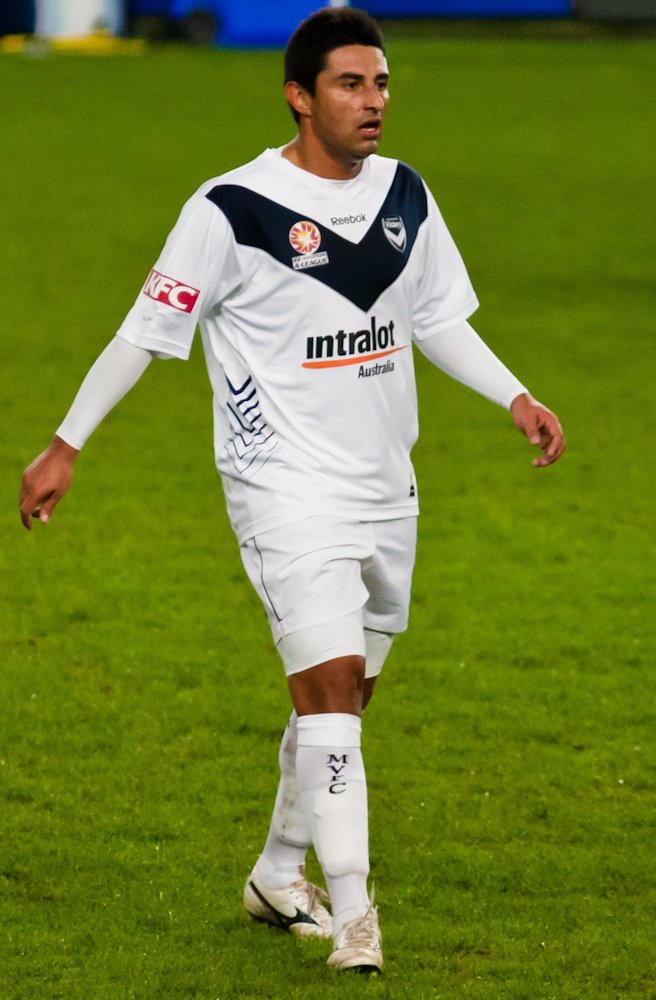
Carlos Hernández playing for Melbourne Victory in 2010

On 12 June 2007, it was confirmed by Melbourne Victory that Hernandez had signed for the Australian Club on a two-year loan from LD Alajuelense. He made his first appearance for the club in their 1–0 A-League Pre-Season Cup loss to the Newcastle Jets, coming on as a substitute in the 70th minute. In the next game, on 28 July 2007, he got his first start against Perth Glory, scoring his first goal for the Victory.

Early on during his first season with Melbourne, he was criticised by a portion of the Melbourne supporters and was said to be 'overweight'. Hernández scored his first league goal for Melbourne Victory against Perth Glory at Docklands Stadium on 21 October 2007, helping Melbourne to a 2–1 win at home.

Towards the end of the season, Hernández' fitness improved and he struck form, becoming a regular goal scorer and assister. One of Hernández' most famous games for the Victory was when he scored Melbourne's only goal against Juventus in a friendly at the Docklands Stadium in May 2008. The goal was a cracking curling effort from just outside the box leaving Juventus goalkeeper Jess Vanstrattan with no chance. He scored the opening goal in Melbourne's 5–0 thrashing of reigning A-League champions Newcastle Jets in Round 3 of the 2008–09 season at the Docklands Stadium. His 6th goal for the club came against the Central Coast Mariners in Round 20, a cracking free kick that went through the wall and through the legs of keeper Danny Vukovic. He won widespread acclaim for his performance in Melbourne's 4–0 A-League semi-final second leg win over Adelaide United, in which he scored one goal and assisted for the other three.

On 1 April 2009, Hernández claimed on Costa Rican television that the Victory had bought him from LD Alajuelense and he had signed a three-year deal. It was reported that he would go on loan to MLS club Los Angeles Galaxy until the start of the A-League season in August. The Galaxy has since denied any interest in Hernandez.

On 17 April 2009, the Costa Rican newspaper La Nación reported that Melbourne Victory and LD Alajuelense had finally come to an agreement regarding the sale of the player for an undisclosed fee believed to be in the region of $450,000 and his signing was officially announced by the club on 14 May.

On 26 September 2009, Hernández scored a goal helping his side win against Gold Coast United 3–2. The 35-yard hit again left Jess Vanstrattan with little chance as it tore into the top left corner. On 15 February 2010, Hernandez won the Johnny Warren Medal for best player in the A-League for season 2009–10, awarded at The Ivy in Sydney. On 16 May 2012 it was announced he had parted company with Melbourne Victory.

=== Prayag United ===
On 27 June it was announced that Hernández has signed a one-year deal with I-League club Prayag United making it one of the biggest transfers in Indian football. At his official media presentation he said "I am really happy to be associated with Prayag United Sports Club. I am looking forward to this new opportunity and challenges. It has indeed been a big decision to move to India, but I feel that there is this huge zest and enthusiasm for football here. I am excited to be part of this excellent team, and hope to contribute to the success of the team in the coming season" On 12 October, in the 2nd match of the I-League, he had assisted Kiwi striker Kayne Vincent to take a decisive 2–1 lead against city rivals Mohun Bagan at the stroke of half-time, after defender Sukhen Dey had equalised on the 27th minute. Hernández has stated that he wants to return to the A-League after his contract in India expires. On 4 January 2013 against Dempo at the municipal stadium at Kalyani, he scored from an inswinging direct free kick on 87th minute to ensure a 1–0 win over the defending champions.

=== Wellington Phoenix ===
In February 2013, Hernández was signed by New Zealand A-League club Wellington Phoenix on a two-year contract. He joined the Phoenix in June, as soon as his contract with Prayag United expired.

In the 2013–14 season, Hernández scored 7 goals in 21 appearances, the same number as fellow Phoenix and Costa Rica teammate Kenny Cunningham.

Due to his family finding it difficult to settle in Wellington, Hernández was released from Wellington Phoenix by mutual consent.

=== Cartaginés ===
In June 2014, Hernández was signed by Cartaginés on a one-year contract.

=== Dempo ===
Hernández will be representing Dempo of the Indian I-League for the 2014–15 season as their Marquee Player.

== International career ==
He has been an important player for the Costa Rica national football team at numerous levels, playing in the under-20 Football World Youth Championship held in Argentina, as well as representing the country with the U-23 team at the 2004 Summer Olympics. He has also been capped for the senior national team on 40 occasions, playing for the team during the 2006 FIFA World Cup qualifiers and scoring some important goals. The playmaker was then part of the 2006 FIFA World Cup squad in Germany but managed only two substitute appearances in the group games against Ecuador & Poland. He scored a cracker in his last international against France national football team, drilling a shot from 25 metres out into the left hand side of the net.

=== International goals ===
Scores and results list. Costa Rica's goal tally first.

| Goal | Date | Venue | Opponent | Score | Result | Competition |
|---|---|---|---|---|---|---|
| 1 | 7 September 2004 | FIU Stadium, Fort Lauderdale, USA | Guatemala | 1 – 0 | 2–0 | Friendly |
| 2 | 19 November 2004 | Estadio Alejandro Morera Soto, Alajuela, Costa Rica | Canada | 2 – 1 | 2–1 | Friendly |
| 3 | 12 June 2005 | Estadio Pedro Marrero, Havana, Cuba | Guatemala | 1 – 2 | 2–2 | World Cup qualifier |
| 4 | 4 September 2005 | Estadio Rommel Fernández, Panama City | United States | 0 – 1 | 1–3 | World Cup qualifier |
| 5 | 7 September 2005 | Estadio Ricardo Saprissa, San José, Costa Rica | United States | 1 – 0 | 2–0 | World Cup qualifier |
| 6 | 9 November 2006 | Stade d'Honneur de Dillon, Fort-de-France, Martinique | Iran | 0 – 1 | 3–2 | Friendly |
| 7 | 26 March 2010 | Rose Bowl, Pasadena, USA | France | 1 – 0 | 1–2 | Friendly |

== Career statistics ==
Correct as of 24 April 2015

Appearances and goals by club, season and competition
| Club | Season | League | | | Cup | | | Continental | | | Total | | |
| Club | Season | Apps | Goals | Assists | Apps | Goals | Assists | Apps | Goals | Assists | Apps | Goals | Assists |
|---|---|---|---|---|---|---|---|---|---|---|---|---|---|
| L.D. Alajuelense | 2001–02 | 0 | 0 | 0 | - | - | - | 8 | 1 | 0 | 8 | 1 | 0 |
| L.D. Alajuelense | 2002–03 | 10 | 2 | 1 | - | - | - | 2 | 1 | 0 | 12 | 3 | 1 |
| L.D. Alajuelense | 2003–04 | 16 | 4 | 5 | - | - | - | 6 | 0 | 3 | 21 | 4 | 8 |
| L.D. Alajuelense | 2004–05 | 24 | 3 | 12 | - | - | - | 8 | 4 | 2 | 31 | 7 | 14 |
| L.D. Alajuelense | 2005–06 | 20 | 6 | 11 | - | - | - | 7 | 1 | 2 | 26 | 7 | 13 |
| L.D. Alajuelense | 2006–07 | 12 | 4 | 2 | - | - | - | 4 | 0 | 0 | 16 | 4 | 2 |
| L.D. Alajuelense | Total | 82 | 19 | 31 | 0 | 0 | 0 | 35 | 7 | 7 | 117 | 26 | 38 |
| Melbourne Victory | 2007–08 | 20 | 4 | 3 | 3 | 2 | 0 | 1 | 1 | 0 | 24 | 7 | 3 |
| Melbourne Victory | 2008–09 | 21 | 4 | 6 | 4 | 1 | 1 | - | - | - | 25 | 5 | 7 |
| Melbourne Victory | 2009–10 | 28 | 13 | 9 | - | - | - | 6 | 0 | 2 | 34 | 13 | 11 |
| Melbourne Victory | 2010–11 | 30 | 5 | 7 | - | - | - | 4 | 1 | 2 | 34 | 6 | 9 |
| Melbourne Victory | 2011–12 | 21 | 10 | 2 | - | - | - | - | - | - | 21 | 9 | 2 |
| Melbourne Victory | Total | 120 | 35 | 27 | 7 | 3 | 1 | 11 | 2 | 4 | 138 | 40 | 32 |
| Prayag United | 2012–13 | 16 | 4 | 4 | 0 | 0 | 0 | 0 | 0 | 0 | 16 | 4 | 4 |
| Wellington Phoenix | 2013–14 | 20 | 7 | 10 | 0 | 0 | 0 | 0 | 0 | 0 | 20 | 7 | 10 |
| Cartaginés | 2014–15 | 0 | 0 | 0 | 0 | 0 | 0 | 0 | 0 | 0 | 0 | 0 | 0 |
| Dempo | 2014–15 | 8 | 1 | 0 | 0 | 0 | - | - | - | 0 | 8 | 1 | 0 |
| Career total | | 244 | 67 | 72 | 7 | 3 | 1 | 46 | 9 | 11 | 301 | 79 | 84 |

== Honours ==
Alajuelense

- Costa Rican Championship: 2000–01, 2001–02, 2002–03, 2004–05
- CONCACAF Champions' Cup: 2004
- Copa Interclubes UNCAF: 2002, 2005

Melbourne Victory

- A-League Championship: 2008–2009
- A-League Premiership: 2008–2009

Prayag United

- IFA Shield: 2013

Individual:

- Johnny Warren Medal: 2009–2010 with Melbourne Victory
- Melbourne Victory Player's Player of the Year: 2009–2010
