= Kenny Cunningham (footballer, born 1985) =

Costa Rican footballer

Personal information
- Full name: Kenny Martin Cunningham Brown
- Date of birth: 7 June 1985 (age 41)
- Place of birth: Limón, Costa Rica
- Height: 1.72 m (5 ft 7 1/2 in)
- Position: Winger

Team information
- Current team: Santos de Guápiles

Senior career*
Years	Team	Apps	(Gls)
2005–2006	Pérez Zeledón	18	(1)
2006–2007	Carmelita	25	(7)
2007–2008	Alajuelense	14	(2)
2008–2009	Herediano	22	(1)
2009–2011	San Carlos	67	(16)
2012	Gainare Tottori	9	(1)
2013	The Strongest	12	(1)
2013–2015	Wellington Phoenix	40	(11)
2014–2015	Wellington Phoenix Reserves	2	(1)
2015–2016	Herediano	19	(5)
2016	San Carlos	33	(0)
2017	→ CS Uruguay (loan)	63	(3)
2017–2019	Santos de Guápiles	89	(16)
2018–2019	Malacateco	39	(8)
2019	Pérez Zeledón	18	(2)
2020–2021	Limón	27	(0)
2020–2021	→ Santos de Guápiles (loan)	26	(7)

International career^{‡}
2011–2016	Costa Rica	14	(1)
- * Club domestic league appearances and goals as of 30 July 2021 ‡ National team caps and goals as of 11 August 2017

Kenny Martin Cunningham Brown (born 7 June 1985) is a Costa Rican professional footballer who plays as a winger.

== Playing career ==
Cunningham started his professional career at Pérez Zeledón and played for Carmelita, Alajuelense and Herediano before signing up with San Carlos in September 2009. He moved abroad to join Japanese second division side Gainare Tottori in February 2012 but missed a large part of the season due to a rare disease. In January 2013 he moved to Bolivia to play for The Strongest.

=== Wellington Phoenix ===
On 26 July 2013, Cunningham signed a two-year contract with New Zealand A-League club Wellington Phoenix. It was said that fellow Costa Rican and Wellington player Carlos Hernandez first recommended him to Phoenix coach Ernie Merrick.

In the 2013–14 season, Cunningham scored 7 goals in 23 appearances, the same number as fellow Phoenix and Costa Rica teammate Carlos Hernández. His long-range goal in a 5–0 home victory over the Melbourne Victory was named goal of the year for the Phoenix in 2013–14.

== International career ==
Cunningham made his international debut for Costa Rica in an international friendly against Cuba on 12 December 2011. He was a 69th-minute substitute and helped secure a 1–1 draw with a 90th-minute equaliser.

Cunningham made his full debut later that month, playing 90 minutes in a 2–0 away victory against Venezuela. As of May 2014, he earned 13 caps, scoring one goal. He represented his country in 2 FIFA World Cup qualification matches and played at the 2013 CONCACAF Gold Cup but was left out of the 2014 World Cup squad.

=== International goals ===
Scores and results list Costa Rica's goal tally first.

No	Date	Venue	Opponent	Score	Result	Competition
1.	11 December 2011	Estadio Pedro Marrero, Havana, Cuba	Cuba	1–1	1–1	Friendly

== Honours ==
Individual

- CONCACAF League Team of the Tournament: 2017

== Personal life ==
His twin brother Kevin is also a professional footballer, they played together at Carmelita.

Kenny and Kevin are related to Australian Rory Cunningham.
