= Michael Hester =

New Zealand association football referee

Mike Hester
- Full name: Michael Hester
- Born: 2 May 1972 (age 54); Sydney, New South Wales, Australia
- Other occupation: Naval officer

Domestic
Years	League	Role
2004–2011	NZFC	Referee
2004–2005	National Premier Leagues NSW	Referee
2008–2011	A-League	Referee

International
Years	League	Role
2007–2011	FIFA listed	Referee

Michael Hester (born 2 May 1972), is a former New Zealand association football referee in the A-League. Holder of a FIFA international licence, he has participated at the highest level, officiating at the 2010 FIFA World Cup.

== Biography ==
Hester has been a NZFC certified referee since 2004 and gained his FIFA international qualification in January 2007. He refereed some games in the 2008 Summer Olympics, and has also refereed matches in the Oceania qualification group for the 2010 FIFA World Cup.

He was also appointed as a referee for the 2009 FIFA Under 17 World Cup in Nigeria.

Hester was included on the short list to officiate at the 2010 FIFA World Cup in South Africa along with fellow New Zealand referee Peter O'Leary, both of whom were confirmed in the final 30 officials to take charge at the finals. He was assisted by Tongan assistant referee Tevita Makasini. On 12 June 2010 he refereed the FIFA World Cup game between Greece and South Korea. Hester blew the final whistle on his refereeing career at the end of the 2011 New Zealand winter season to focus on his career in the Royal New Zealand Navy.

=== Personal life ===
He has worked, besides his football career, as a naval officer in Auckland, and played both Rugby union and football before turning to officiating.

=== Honours ===
- 2009: NZDF Sports Award: Outstanding Sports Person of the Year
- 2017: Official referee of The Football Ramble
