= Peter O'Leary (referee) =

New Zealand football referee

- Born: 3 March 1972 (age 54); Wellington, North Island, New Zealand
- Other occupation: Biology Schoolteacher

Domestic
Years	League	Role
? -	NZFC	Referee
? -	A-League	Referee

International
Years	League	Role
2003–	FIFA listed	Referee

Peter O'Leary (born 3 March 1972) is a New Zealand former Association football referee, previously of Wellington but now is residing in Hamilton. He operated in the Australian A-League and the New Zealand Football Championship, and his other occupation is as a teacher and deputy principal at Te Aroha College.

He currently has the record for controlling the most matches in the FIFA Club World Cup.

== Career ==
He first took up refereeing in 1994. He has officiated in many Oceania Football Confederation tournaments since becoming a FIFA referee in 2003, notably the OFC Nations Cup in 2004, and the Oceania Club Championship in 2006.

In 2007, he was selected to officiate at the FIFA Under-20 World Cup in Canada during June and July of that year. He took charge of the Group F game between Nigeria and Costa Rica at the Royal Athletic Park in Victoria, British Columbia, on 1 July. He was then assigned the Group B match between Uruguay and Jordan at the Swangard Stadium in Burnaby, on 4 July. At the English Premiership tie between Aston Villa and Sunderland F.C. as a guest of top English referee Steve Bennett, O’Leary was summoned from the stands to assume Bennett's role on the touchline as 4th official for the second half of the match.

O'Leary officiated at the FIFA Club World Cup in Japan, as the referee for the fifth place playoff between Adelaide United and Al Ahly and at the 2009 FIFA U-20 World Cup in Egypt, refereeing group games between Italy and Trinidad and Tobago and between Hungary and the United Arab Emirates, along with one game at the 2009 FIFA Club World Cup in United Arab Emirates, refereeing TP Mazembe and Pohang Steelers FC.

O'Leary was included on the short list to officiate at the 2010 FIFA World Cup in South Africa along with fellow New Zealand referee Michael Hester, both of whom were confirmed in the final 30 officials to take charge at the finals.

O'Leary refereed the 2015 AFC Asian Cup match between Korea Republic and Oman.

O'Leary retired in 2015, after controlling his 64th A-League game.

=== 2014 World Cup ===
On 19 June 2014, he was announced as the referee for the group match between Nigeria and Bosnia-Herzegovina at the 2014 FIFA World Cup in Brazil. The match was won by Nigeria 1–0 after a goal by Edin Džeko of Bosnia-Herzegovina was disallowed when he was ruled offside by the assistant referee. Peter O’Leary, later admitted that Džeko's goal was disallowed in error. He was the fourth official for the match between France and Honduras.

=== A-League Matches ===
- 2005/2006 Season: 11 Matches (Including: 1 Pre-season)
- 2006/2007 Season: 10 Matches (Including: 3 Pre-season)
- 2007/2008 Season: 6 Matches (Including: 1 Pre-Season)
- 2008/2009 Season: 10 Matches (Including: 1 Pre-season)
- 2009/2010 Season: 5 Matches (Including: 1 Pre-season)
- 2010/2011 Season: 9 Matches
- 2011/2012 Season: 2 Matches
- 2012/2013 Season: 5 Matches
- 2013/2014 Season: 6 Matches
- 2014/2015 Season: 7 Matches
