= Jonathan McKain =

Scottish Australian soccer player

Jon McKain
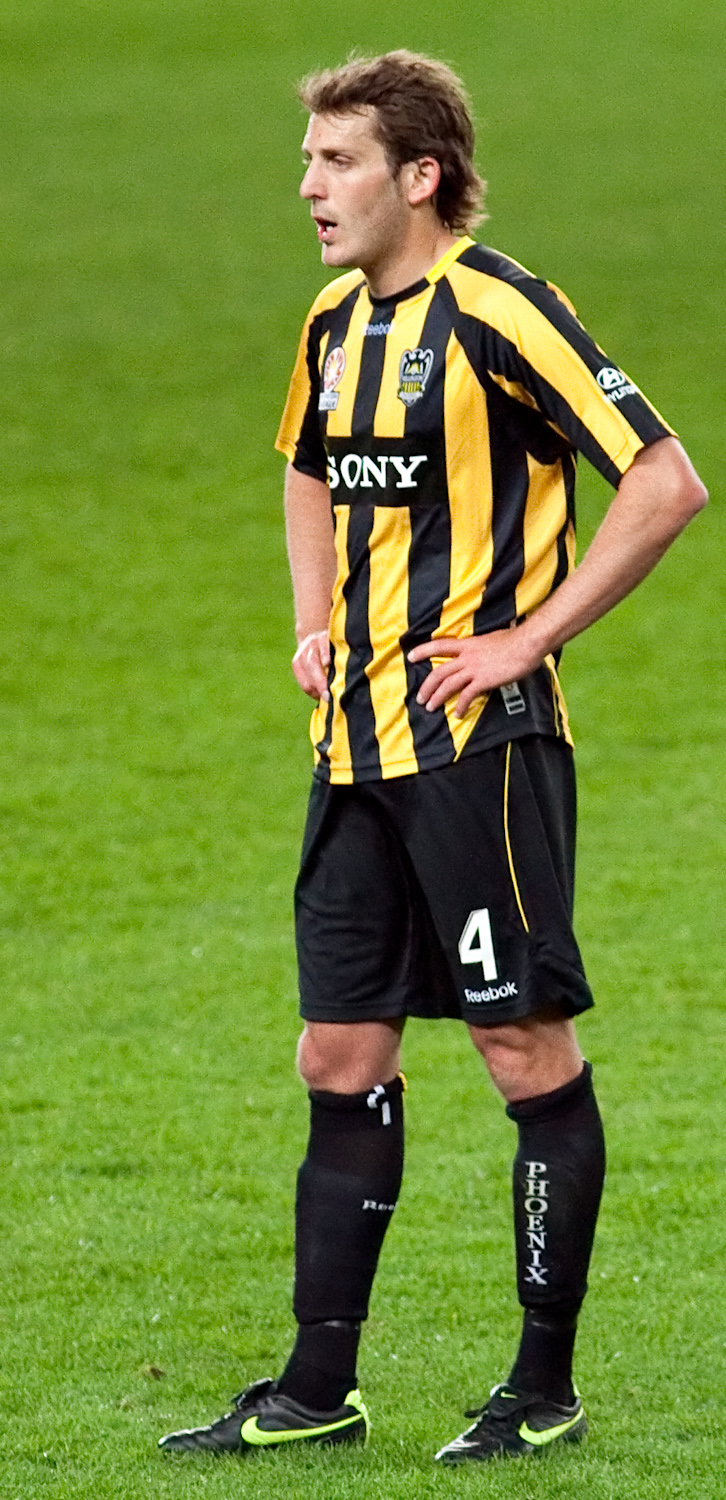
- McKain playing for Wellington Phoenix in 2009

Personal information
- Full name: Jonathan David McKain
- Date of birth: 21 September 1982 (age 44)
- Place of birth: Brisbane, Australia
- Height: 6 ft 1 in (1.85 m)
- Positions: Centre back; defensive midfielder

Youth career
- 1998: QAS

Senior career*
Years	Team	Apps	(Gls)
1999–2003	Brisbane Strikers	77	(4)
2003–2005	Naţional București	57	(2)
2005–2008	Politehnica Timișoara	65	(2)
2008–2010	Wellington Phoenix	37	(2)
2010–2011	Al-Nassr	21	(2)
2011–2014	Adelaide United	48	(2)
2015–2016	Kelantan FA	31	(2)
2017	Souths United	18	(2)
2018–2019	Rochedale Rovers	31	(5)
Total		386	(23)

International career^{‡}
2001	Australia U-20	10	(0)
2004	Australia U-23	4	(0)
2004–2011	Australia	16	(0)
Medal record
Representing Australia
Men's Association football
AFC Asian Cup
Runner-up	2011 Qatar
- * Club domestic league appearances and goals as of 17 September 2019 ‡ National team caps and goals as of 27 January 2016

Jonathan "Jon" McKain (born 21 September 1982) is a Scottish Australian football player who retired from professional football in 2016 after a long and successful career. He played in countries including Romania, Australia, Saudi Arabia, and Malaysia and was a fan favourite for his whole hearted displays and football abilities. After professional retirement, he played for the Rochedale Rovers in FQPL. He is generally a defender but can also play as a defensive midfielder. He was a forceful ball playing centre back or midfielder who was recognised for his work rate and discipline

== Club career ==
McKain was educated at the Anglican Church Grammar School, and he joined Romania club FC Politehnica in the summer of 2005, from fellow Divizia A club FC Naţional București. He had enjoyable success in Romanian and was very well regarded throughout the league by players, coaches, media and fans. He was approached to seek his interest to play for Romania National team after his first season but his heart was always with Australia. He has also played for the Brisbane Strikers in Australia prior to his time in Romania

McKain signed for the Wellington Phoenix for the 2008–2009 A-League season and became a pivotal part of the sides most recognisable period. Despite several injuries McKain maintained excellent form when fit which spark several offers from other A-League clubs and overseas interest. On 14 June 2010, McKain signed a one-year renewable contract for Al-Nassr to be added to Walter Zenga squad. A US$ 1.5 million transfer fee was paid.

After his successful stint in the Middle East with Saudi Arabia club Al-Nassr, McKain returned to Australia, and signed an undisclosed contract with Adelaide United.

In August 2011, McKain was named as Adelaide United's captain ahead of the 2011–12 A-League season after impressing in pre-season friendlies and coaching staff. and played for the club for 3 seasons.

In October 2014, McKain signed for Malaysia Super League club Kelantan FA. He quickly impressed the fans with a goal he scored during a match with LionsXII that ended up in 2–0 win in their homeground stadium and went on to play for 2 successful seasons for the Red Warriors Sultan Muhammad IV Stadium, Kota Bharu, Kelantan in 2015

McKain announce his retirement from professional football on his Twitter account in 2016, after a 17-year career. He continued to play semi-professional football in Brisbane for Souths United in the FQPL and then for two seasons for Rochedale Rovers before finishing playing in 2019.

== International career ==
McKain has represented Australia and made three appearances at the 2005 Confederations Cup in Germany. He also represented Australia at the 2004 Olympics and the 2011 Asian Cup in Qatar

== Career statistics ==
A-league Club Performances
Club	Season	A-League		Finals Series		Asia		Total
Club	Season	App	Goals	App	Goals	App	Goals	App	Goals
Wellington Phoenix F.C. (A-League)	2008–09	18	0					18	0
Wellington Phoenix F.C. (A-League)	2009–10	17	2	2	0			19	2
Wellington Phoenix F.C. (A-League)	Club Total	35	2	2	0			37	2
Career totals
Last updated 1 June 2010

Malaysia Super League Club Performances
Club	Season	Super League		FA Cup		League Cup		Others		Total
Club	Season	App	Goals	App	Goals	App	Goals	App	Goals	App	Goals
Kelantan FA (Malaysia Super League)	2015	16	2	6	0	4	0	–	–	26	2
Kelantan FA (Malaysia Super League)	2016	9	0	1	1	3	0	–	–	13	1
Kelantan FA (Malaysia Super League)	Club Total	25	2	7	1	7	0	–	–	39	3
Career totals		25	2	7	1	7	0	–	–	39	3
Last updated 30 July 2016

== National team statistics ==
Australia national team
Year	Apps	Goals
2004	2	0
2005	8	0
2006	2	0
2007	0	0
2008	0	0
2009	0	0
2010	2	0
2011	2	0
Total	16	0

== Honours ==
Kelantan FA

- Malaysia FA Cup:2015 (runner up)

Australia

- AFC Asian Cup: runner-up 2011
