= Tim Brown (footballer) =

New Zealand footballer (born 1981)

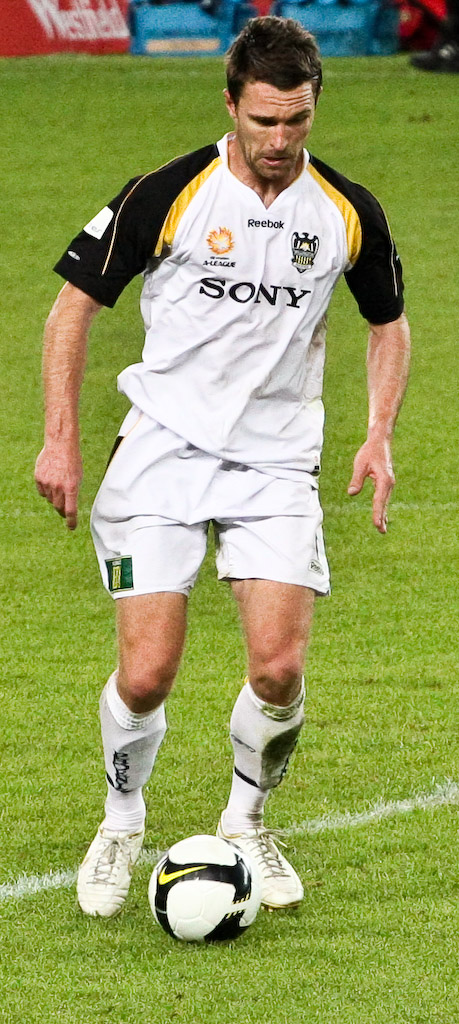
- Brown in 2008

Personal information
- Full name: Timothy Brown
- Date of birth: 6 March 1981 (age 45)
- Place of birth: Congleton, England
- Height: 1.85 m (6 ft 1 in)
- Position: Midfielder

Youth career
- 1995–2000: Miramar Rangers

Senior career*
Years	Team	Apps	(Gls)
2001–2004	Cincinnati Bearcats		
2004–2006	Richmond Kickers	32	(1)
2006–2007	Newcastle Jets	10	(1)
2007–2012	Wellington Phoenix	112	(23)
Total		154	(25)

International career
- New Zealand U20
- New Zealand U23
2004–2012	New Zealand	30	(0)
- * Club domestic league appearances and goals

Tim Brown (born 6 March 1981) is a New Zealand former professional footballer and businessman. He is the co-founder of footwear company Allbirds. Brown was one of seven foundation players of the Wellington Phoenix, being signed in 2007 for the club's inaugural season in the A-League. Brown was known for his high work rate as a box-to-box midfielder, often making trademark late runs into the penalty box where he scored most of his goals.

== Education ==
Brown studied design at the University of Cincinnati College of Design, Architecture, Art, and Planning, graduating in 2005 Cum Laude.

== Club career ==
Brown's senior career began with Miramar Rangers before moving to the United States where he played for the University of Cincinnati and later Richmond Kickers in the USL Second Division.

=== Newcastle Jets ===
In 2006 Brown moved to Australia to join Newcastle Jets in the A-League after being noticed by the club in a standout performance for the national team, the All Whites, in a 1–1 draw against Premier League side Charlton Athletic in August 2006. He made his A-League debut on 8 October 2006, starting in a 2–0 loss to Melbourne Victory. His first goal for the Jets came on 4 November 2006 against Sydney FC. Brown's late equaliser earned the Jets a 1–1 draw at home.

At the end of the 2006–07 season, Brown was granted a release by the Newcastle Jets to sign a two-year deal with new A-League franchise Wellington Phoenix, where he was named as vice-captain.

=== Wellington Phoenix ===
Brown signed for the Wellington Phoenix for their inaugural season by head coach Ricki Herbert who was also the coach of the national side, the All Whites. Brown made his first team debut in the 2007 Pre-Season Cup fixture against Central Coast Mariners which Wellington went on to lose 2–0. His A-League debut came on 30 September 2007 in the round 6 clash at home against Perth Glory, a game which Wellington went on to win 4–1.

Brown had to wait until his second season with the Phoenix for his first goal for the club, which came in the form of a 76th-minute winner against Sydney FC in round 6 of the 2008–09 season at home on 28 September 2008. He scored two more goals that season.

The 2009–10 season was a very successful one for Brown and the Phoenix, with Brown playing a pivotal role in the Phoenix's successful playoffs charge, (the first by a New Zealand club in the A-League) making 26 appearances, all of which he started and scoring 8 goals including an equaliser against former club Newcastle Jets in their home minor semi-final, a game the Phoenix won 3–1.

On 26 March 2012, Brown announced his retirement from football following the conclusion of the 2011–12 A-League season, to pursue a master's degree in management at either the London School of Economics or Cambridge University.

Brown's last game for the Phoenix was a disappointing 3–2 loss to the Perth Glory in the playoffs at the end of the 2011–12 season.

== International career ==
Brown represented New Zealand at Under-20 and Under-23 level before making his full All Whites debut in a 3–0 win over Solomon Islands on 31 May 2004.

Brown was included in the 2009 FIFA Confederations Cup squad in South Africa where he captained the side.

Seen as a future All Whites captain, Brown has played all but three of the 14 national team matches since Ricki Herbert took charge in 2005. Brown was a standout in the 1–1 draw at English premier leaguers Charlton Athletic in August 2006, a performance that eventually led to an A-League contract with the Newcastle Jets in Australia.

Brown was handed the captain's arm-band for the credible 2–2 draw in Wales in late 2007 May due to the unavailability of regular captain Danny Hay. Given the responsibility of leading his country for the first time against Wales, Brown put on a masterful display in Wrexham with a whole-hearted effort and supplied the ball for Shane Smeltz's second goal. Brown retained the All Whites captaincy for the beginning of 2010 FIFA World Cup qualification but was sent off against Vanuatu in Wellington on 21 November 2007. The red card earned Brown a suspension for the World Cup qualifier against New Caledonia and with Ryan Nelsen returning after a four-year absence, Brown relinquished the captaincy to the Blackburn Rovers skipper but retained a leadership role in the team as vice-captain.

In 2009, another injury-enforced absence of Ryan Nelsen provided another opportunity for Brown to once again assume the captaincy, leading the All Whites in their third Confederations Cup campaign and also earning their first-ever point in a senior men's FIFA tournament in a 0–0 draw with Iraq.

On 14 November 2009, Brown and the All Whites beat Bahrain 1–0 to qualify for the 2010 FIFA World Cup.

On 10 May 2010, Brown was named in New Zealand's final 23-man squad of which he is vice-captain to compete at the 2010 FIFA World Cup. However Brown sustained a fractured humerus after landing on it awkwardly in a tackle with Vince Grella during a friendly match against Australia on 24 May 2010. Brown had surgery on 27 May in which three screws were inserted to strengthen and support the broken bone. The surgery was a success, but a considerable loss of match fitness during his recovery period coupled with consistent good performances by teammates Ivan Vicelich and Simon Elliott prevented Brown from making an appearance in New Zealand's historic World Cup 2010 finals campaign.

== Life after football ==
On 27 March 2012, Brown announced his intention to retire from the professional game in order to commence a master's degree in management at either the London School of Economics or Cambridge University.

In March 2016, Brown and his co-founder Joey Zwillinger officially launched Allbirds, a company built on the premise of creating environmentally-friendly and sustainable shoes.

== Career statistics ==
Appearances and goals by club, season and competition
Club	Season	League			Play-offs (Note: Includes A-League Finals Series.)		Asia		Total	
Club	Season	Division	Apps	Goals	Apps	Goals	Apps	Goals	Apps	Goals
Newcastle Jets	2006–07	A-League	10	1					10	1
Wellington Phoenix	2007–08	A-League	11	0					11	0
Wellington Phoenix	2008–09	A-League	17	3					17	3
Wellington Phoenix	2009–10	A-League	24	7	3	1			27	8
Wellington Phoenix	2010–11	A-League	29	6	1	0			30	6
Wellington Phoenix	2011–12	A-League	25	5	1	1			26	6
Wellington Phoenix	Total		106	21	5	2			111	23
Career total			116	22	5	2			121	24
