= 2006–07 Perth Glory FC season =

Perth Glory FC
2006–07 season
- Chairman: Nick Tana
- Manager: Ron Smith
- A-League: 7th
- Pre-Season Cup: 6th
- Top goalscorer: League: Jamie Harnwell (7); All: Jamie Harnwell, Stuart Young (7 goals each)

The 2006–07 was Perth Glory's second season in the Hyundai A-League and the club's 10th season since its inception in 1996.

== Players ==
=== First team squad ===
Note: Flags indicate national team as defined under FIFA eligibility rules; some limited exceptions apply. Players may hold more than one non-FIFA nationality.

No.	Pos.	Nation	Player
1	GK	AUS	Jason Petkovic
2	DF	AUS	Ryan Townsend
3	DF	AUS	David Tarka
4	MF	AUS	Simon Colosimo
5	DF	AUS	Jamie Harnwell
6	MF	NZL	Jeremy Christie
7	MF	AUS	Mislav Saric
8	MF	AUS	David Micevski
9	FW	AUS	Luka Glavas
10	FW	AUS	Bobby Despotovski
12	MF	NZL	Leo Bertos
13	DF	AUS	Ante Kovacevic
14	DF	AUS	Jamie Coyne

No.	Pos.	Nation	Player
15	MF	AUS	Mark Robertson
16	DF	NZL	Adrian Webster
17	FW	ENG	Stuart Young
18	DF	NZL	Danny Hay
19	MF	AUS	Naum Sekulovski
20	GK	AUS	Aleks Vrteski
21	DF	AUS	Jimmy Downey
23	DF	NZL	Danny Hay
24	MF	AUS	Paul Pezos
25	MF	AUS	Mark Lee
26	FW	AUS	Nikita Rukavytsya
50	GK	AUS	Tommi Tomich

=== Transfers ===
==== In ====
Date	Pos.	Name	From	Fee	Ref.
3 March 2006	GK	(Australia) Aleks Vrteski	(Australia) Australian Institute of Sport	Free	
9 March 2006	MF	(New Zealand) Jeremy Christie	New Zealand Knights	Free	
29 March 2006	MF	(New Zealand) Leo Bertos	(England) Worksop Town	Free	
29 March 2006	MF	(Australia) David Micevski	(Australia) Perth SC	Free	
9 June 2006	DF	(Australia) Ryan Townsend	Free agent	Free	
6 July 2006	MF	(Australia) Stan Lazaridis	(England) Birmingham City	Free	
18 July 2006	MF	(Australia) Josip Magdić	(Australia) Floreat Athena		
18 July 2006	MF	(Australia) Mark Robertson	Free agent	Free	
18 July 2006	MF	(New Zealand) Adrian Webster	Free agent	Free	
31 July 2006	GK	(Australia) Andrew Crews	(Australia) Marconi		
31 July 2006	GK	(Australia) Andy Petterson	(Australia) Newcastle Jets	Free	
7 August 2006	FW	(Australia) Luka Glavas	(Australia) Sydney United		
9 August 2006	MF	(Australia) Mimi Saric	(Australia) Adelaide Raiders		
14 October 2006	MF	(Australia) Paul Pezos	(Australia) Adelaide City		
26 October 2006	GK	(Australia) Tommi Tomich	(Australia) Western Knights		

==== Out ====
Date	Pos.	Name	To	Fee	Ref.
13 February 2006	MF	(Australia) Adrian Caceres	(Australia) Melbourne Victory	Free	
February 2006	MF	(Solomon Islands) Henry Fa'arodo	(Australia) Bulleen Lions	Free	
1 March 2006	DF	(Australia) Scott Miller	Retired	Free	
March 2006	MF	(Australia) Billy Celeski	(Australia) Bulleen Zebras	Free	
25 May 2006	MF	(Japan) Hiroyuki Ishida	(Malaysia) Johor Darul Ta’zim	Free	
27 June 2006	MF	(Australia) Nick Ward	(England) Queen's Park Rangers	Undisclosed	
June 2006	DF	(Australia) Steve McMahon	Released	Free	
July 2006	DF	(Australia) Daniel Vasilevski	(Australia) Altona Magic	Free	
July 2006	FW	(Australia) Damian Mori	(Australia) Adelaide City	Free	
July 2006	DF	(New Zealand) Danny Hay	(New Zealand) Waitakere United	Free	

== Pre-season and friendlies ==
18 June 2006	Perth Glory	3–1	WA State Select XI	Perth
19:00	Ward; Micevski	Report	Baczynski	Stadium: Members Equity Stadium

Perth Glory	4–0	Perth SC	Perth
Despotovski; Bertos; Magdic	Report

Perth Glory	2–0	Floreat Athena	Perth
Micevski; Despotovski	Report

9 July 2006	Perth Glory	3–0	Sorrento	Perth
	Despotovski; Townsend; Webster	Report		Stadium: Riverlinks Park

== Competitions ==
=== Overview ===
Competition	First match	Last match	Starting round	Final position	Record							
Competition	First match	Last match	Starting round	Final position	Pld	W	D	L	GF	GA	GD	Win %
A-League	26 August 2006	21 January 2007	Matchday 1	7th	21	5	5	11	24	30	−6	23.81
A-League Pre-Season Challenge Cup	15 July 2006	18 August 2006	Group stage	6th	6	1	2	3	3	7	−4	16.67
Total					27	6	7	14	27	37	−10	22.22

Last updated: 23 May 2021
Source: Competitions

=== A-League Pre-Season Challenge Cup ===
==== Group stage ====
Pos	Team	Pld	W	D	L	GF	GA	BP	Pts	Qualification
1	Central Coast Mariners	4	2	2	0	5	2	0	8	Advance to semi-finals
2	Adelaide United	4	2	2	0	2	0	0	8	Advance to semi-finals
3	Melbourne Victory FC	4	1	1	2	5	7	2	6	
4	Perth Glory	4	0	2	2	2	6	0	2	

15 July 2006 1	Central Coast Mariners	2–1	Perth Glory	Gosford
18:00 AEST	Petrie 7'; Kwasnik 8'	Report	Bertos 62'	Stadium: Central Coast Stadium; Attendance: 5,682; Referee: James Lewis

22 July 2006 2	Perth Glory	1–1	Melbourne Victory	Perth
15:00 AWST	Young 59'	Report	Allsopp 51'	Stadium: Dorrien Gardens; Attendance: 1,872; Referee: Angelo Nardi

30 July 2006 3	Perth Glory	0–0	Adelaide United	Perth
15:00 AWST		Report		Stadium: Dorrien Gardens; Attendance: 3,038; Referee: Angelo Nardi

6 August 2006 Bonus	Sydney FC	3–0	Perth Glory	Wollongong
	Brosque 26', 27'; Petrovski 57'	Report		Stadium: WIN Stadium; Referee: Strebre Delovski

==== Finals ====
11 August 2006 5th place qualifying match	New Zealand Knights	0–1	Perth Glory	Auckland
		Report	Young 86'	Stadium: North Harbour Stadium; Attendance: 1,104; Referee: Peter O'Leary

18 August 2006 5th place match	Melbourne Victory	1–0	Perth Glory	Melbourne
19:30 AEST	Allsopp 84'	Report		Stadium: Olympic Park Stadium; Attendance: 2,215; Referee: Ben Williams

=== A-League ===
==== League table ====
Pos	Team	Pld	W	D	L	GF	GA	GD	Pts	Qualification
1	Melbourne Victory (C)	21	14	3	4	41	20	+21	45	Qualification for 2008 AFC Champions League group stage and Finals series
2	Adelaide United	21	10	3	8	32	27	+5	33	Qualification for 2008 AFC Champions League group stage and Finals series
3	Newcastle Jets	21	8	6	7	32	30	+2	30	Qualification for Finals series
4	Sydney FC	21	8	8	5	29	19	+10	29 (Note: Sydney FC were penalised three competition points following round 18 due to salary cap breaches which occurred during the 2005–06 season)	Qualification for Finals series
5	Queensland Roar	21	8	5	8	25	27	−2	29	
6	Central Coast Mariners	21	6	6	9	22	26	−4	24	
7	Perth Glory	21	5	5	11	24	30	−6	20	
8	New Zealand Knights (Note: New Zealand Knights cannot qualify for the AFC Champions League as they are not recognised as an AFC club.)	21	5	4	12	13	39	−26	19	Disbanded at end of season

Source: ultimatealeague.com
Rules for classification: 1) points; 2) goal difference; 3) number of goals scored.
(C) Champions

==== Results summary ====
Overall								Home						Away					
Pld	W	D	L	GF	GA	GD	Pts	W	D	L	GF	GA	GD	W	D	L	GF	GA	GD
21	5	5	11	24	30	−6	20	4	4	2	17	12	+5	1	1	9	7	18	−11

Last updated: 23 May 2021.

==== Matches ====
26 August 2006 1	Queensland Roar	3–0	Perth Glory	Brisbane
19:30 UTC+10	McLaren 84'; Vidosic 82'; Lynch 79'			Stadium: Suncorp Stadium; Attendance: 20,606; Referee: Ben Williams

3 September 2006 2	Perth Glory	2–0	Central Coast Mariners	Perth
	Young 81'; Colosimo 52'			Stadium: Members Equity Stadium; Attendance: 7,229; Referee: Craig Zetter

10 September 2006 3	Perth Glory	1–1	Sydney FC	Perth
	Coyne 69'		Petrovski 36'	Stadium: Members Equity Stadium; Attendance: 7,229; Referee: Simon Przydacz

16 September 2006 4	Adelaide United	3–0	Perth Glory	Adelaide
	Dodd 34'; Rech 14', 50'			Stadium: Hindmarsh Stadium; Attendance: 11,474; Referee: Peter O'Leary

24 September 2006 5	Perth Glory	1–2	Melbourne Victory	Perth
	Tarka 90'		Muscat 72' (pen.); Caceres 54'	Stadium: Members Equity Stadium; Attendance: 7,983; Referee: Peter Green

29 September 2006 6	Newcastle Jets	0–3	Perth Glory	Newcastle
			Harnwell 83'; Young 44', 90'	Stadium: EnergyAustralia Stadium; Attendance: 7,961; Referee: Matthew Breeze

6 October 2006 7	Perth Glory	1–0	New Zealand Knights	Perth
	Young 37'			Stadium: Members Equity Stadium; Attendance: 7,309; Referee: Craig Zetter

15 October 2006 8	Perth Glory	1–2	Queensland Roar	Perth
	Young 2'		Vidosic 53'; Milicic 14'	Stadium: Members Equity Stadium; Attendance: 9,978; Referee: Ben Williams

20 October 2006 9	Central Coast Mariners	2–1	Perth Glory	Gosford
	Pondeljak 2', 87'		Despotovski 58'	Stadium: Bluetongue Stadium; Attendance: 8,496; Referee: Matthew Breeze

29 October 2006 10	Sydney FC	1–1	Perth Glory	Sydney
	Zdrillic 15'		Glavas 75'	Stadium: Aussie Stadium; Attendance: 12,316; Referee: Ben Williams

5 November 2006 11	Adelaide United	3–2	Perth Glory	Adelaide
	Veart 8'; Owens 24'; Kemp 57'		Saric 14'; Despotovski 45+2'; Pezos (red card) 74'	Stadium: Hindmarsh Stadium; Attendance: 11,032; Referee: Matthew Breeze

9 November 2006 12	Melbourne Victory	1–0	Perth Glory	Melbourne
	Brebner 88'			Stadium: Telstra Dome; Attendance: 22,890; Referee: Craig Zetter

18 November 2006 13	Perth Glory	2–1	Newcastle Jets	Perth
	Harnwell 38'; Glavaš 90+4'		Carle 77' (pen.)	Stadium: Members Equity Stadium; Attendance: 7,315; Referee: Angelo Nardi

26 November 2006 14	Perth Glory	4–1	New Zealand Knights	Perth
	Harnwell 10', 42', 60'; Despotovski 83'		Hickey 3'; Salley (yellow card) 8' (yellow-red card) 33'	Stadium: Members Equity Stadium; Attendance: 6,251; Referee: Simon Przydacz

2 December 2006 15	Queensland Roar	1–0	Perth Glory	Brisbane
	McKay 80'			Stadium: Suncorp Stadium; Attendance: 11,237; Referee: Craig Zetter

10 December 2006 16	Central Coast Mariners	1–0	Perth Glory	Gosford
	Kwasnik 12'			Stadium: Bluetongue Stadium; Attendance: 8,089; Referee: Peter O’Leary

14 December 2006 17	Sydney FC	1–0	Perth Glory	Sydney
	Rudan (red card) 28'; Brosque 80'			Stadium: Aussie Stadium; Attendance: 11,816; Referee: Simon Przydacz

28 December 2006 18	Perth Glory	0–0	Adelaide United	Perth
				Stadium: Members Equity Stadium; Attendance: 8,226; Referee: Ben Williams

7 January 2007 19	Perth Glory	2–2	Melbourne Victory	Perth
	Harnwell 29'; Byrnes 43' (o.g.)		Sarkies 58', 76'; Byrnes (red card) 72'	Stadium: Members Equity Stadium; Attendance: 6,462; Referee: Peter Green

14 January 2007 20	Perth Glory	3–3	Newcastle Jets	Perth
	Colosimo 43' (pen.); Harnwell 78'; Magdic 81'		Carle 12'; Griffiths 90+1', 90+4'	Stadium: Members Equity Stadium; Attendance: 7,904; Referee: Simon Przydacz

21 January 2007 21	New Zealand Knights	2–0	Perth Glory	Auckland
	Emblen 32'; Buari 40'			Stadium: North Harbour Stadium; Attendance: 4,936; Referee: Kevin Docherty

== Squad statistics ==
=== Appearances ===
No.	Pos	Nat	Player	Total		A-League		Pre-Season Cup	
No.	Pos	Nat	Player	Apps	Goals	Apps	Goals	Apps	Goals
1	GK	(Australia)	Jason Petkovic	6	0	4	0	2	0
2	DF	(Australia)	Ryan Townsend	5	0	1	0	4	0
3	DF	(Australia)	David Tarka	26	1	20	1	5+1	0
4	MF	(Australia)	Simon Colosimo	17	2	16	2	0+1	0
5	FW	(Australia)	Jamie Harnwell	27	7	20+1	7	6	0
6	MF	(New Zealand)	Jeremy Christie	21	0	8+11	0	2	0
7	MF	(Australia)	Mimi Saric	12	1	4+6	1	2	0
8	MF	(Australia)	David Micevski	15	0	4+7	0	4	0
9	FW	(Australia)	Luka Glavas	17	2	13+2	2	0+2	0
10	FW	(Australia)	Bobby Despotovski	14	3	7+3	3	2+2	0
11	MF	(Australia)	Stan Lazaridis	13	0	11	0	2	0
12	MF	(New Zealand)	Leo Bertos	26	1	21	0	5	1
13	DF	(Australia)	Ante Kovacevic	25	0	18+1	0	6	0
14	DF	(Australia)	Jamie Coyne	20	1	20	1	0	0
15	MF	(Australia)	Mark Robertson	6	0	1+1	0	4	0
16	MF	(New Zealand)	Adrian Webster	24	0	14+6	0	4	0
17	FW	(England)	Stuart Young	23	7	16+1	5	6	2
18	MF	(Australia)	Josip Magdic	9	1	1+3	1	1+4	0
19	MF	(Australia)	Naum Sekulovski	21	0	15+1	0	5	0
20	GK	(Australia)	Aleks Vrteski	11	0	7+1	0	2+1	0
24	MF	(Australia)	Paul Pezos	3	0	1+2	0	0	0
25	MF	(Australia)	Tyler Simpson	2	0	1	0	1	0
25	MF	(Australia)	Mark Lee	6	0	5+1	0	0	0
26	FW	(Australia)	Nikita Rukavytsya	3	0	2+1	0	0	0
30	GK	(Australia)	Andrew Crews	1	0	0	0	1	0
40	GK	(Australia)	Andy Petterson	1	0	0	0	1	0
50	GK	(Australia)	Tommi Tomich	10	0	10	0	0	0

=== Goalscorers ===
Rnk	No	Pos	Nat	Name	A-League	Pre-Season Cup	Total
1	5	FW	(Australia)	Jamie Harnwell	7	0	7
1	17	FW	(England)	Stuart Young	5	2	7
3	10	FW	(Australia)	Bobby Despotovski	3	0	3
4	4	MF	(Australia)	Simon Colosimo	2	0	2
4	9	FW	(Australia)	Luka Glavas	2	0	2
6	4	DF	(Australia)	David Tarka	1	0	1
6	7	MF	(Australia)	Mimi Saric	1	0	1
6	12	MF	(New Zealand)	Leo Bertos	0	1	1
6	14	DF	(Australia)	Jamie Coyne	1	0	1
6	18	MF	(Australia)	Josip Magdic	1	0	1
Own goals					1	0	1
Total					24	3	27
