= 2007–08 Perth Glory FC season =

Perth Glory FC
2007–08 season
- Stadium: Members Equity Stadium
- A-League: 7th
- A-League Pre-Season Challenge Cup: Runners-up
- Top goalscorer: League: Jamie Harnwell (8); All: Jamie Harnwell (10)

The 2007–08 Perth Glory FC season was the club's 11th season since its establishment in 1996. The club competed in the A-League for the 3rd time.

The Glory finished 7th in the 2007–08 A-League season, making them the worst Australian team in the A-League, for the second consecutive season. Given the team's promising pre-season performances, expectations at the club were to achieve a top 4 finish, or to at least significantly improve over the performance in the previous A-League season. After a poor start to the season, without a win after the first 11 games and Glory winless for 18 consecutive A-League matches, coach Ron Smith departed and assistant coach, David Mitchell took over for the rest of the season. After 2 wins from his first 4 games in charge, Mitchell was rewarded by having his contract extended till the end of the 2008-09 Season.

== Squad changes for 2007-08 season ==
=== In ===
Date	Pos.	Name	From	Fee	Ref.
2 March 2007	MF	(Australia) Billy Celeski	(Australia) Bulleen Lions	Free	
2 March 2007	MF	(Australia) Anthony Danze	(Australia) Inglewood United	Free	
2 March 2007	DF	(Australia) Dino Djulbic	(Australia) South Melbourne	Free	
2 March 2007	DF	(Australia) Jimmy Downey	(Australia) Australian Institute of Sport	Free	
22 March 2007	GK	(Australia) Tando Velaphi	(Australia) Perth SC	Free	
22 March 2007	MF	(Australia) Tommi Tomich	(Australia) Western Knights	Injury Loan Cover	
27 March 2007	MF	(Australia) Nikita Rukavytsya	(Australia) Perth SC	Free	
1 April 2007	DF	(Australia) Nikolai Topor-Stanley	(Australia) Sydney FC	Free	
19 May 2007	MF	(Australia) Nick Rizzo	(England) Milton Keynes Dons	Free	
24 May 2007	DF	(Australia) Simon Colosimo	(Turkey) Sivasspor	Loan return	
25 May 2007	FW	(Croatia) Mate Dragičević	(Croatia) NK Pula	Free	
10 July 2007	DF	(Australia) Hayden Foxe	(England) Leeds United	Free	
15 July 2007	MF	(Australia) Mitchell Prentice	(Malaysia) Pahang FA	Free	
4 August 2007	FW	(England) James Robinson	(Australia) Marconi Stallions	Free	
4 September 2007	DF	(Australia) Tyler Simpson	(Australia) Sydney Olympic	Free	
4 September 2007	MF	(Australia) Jordan Simpson	(Switzerland) BSC Young Boys	Free	
4 September 2007	GK	(Australia) Danny Milosevic	(Australia) Inglewood United	Short-Term Injury Loan (1 Week)	

=== Out ===
Date	Pos.	Name	To	Fee	Ref.
January 2007	MF	(England) Stuart Young	(Australia) Mandurah City	Free	
February 2007	FW	(Australia) Bobby Despotovski	(Australia) Inglewood United	Free	
February 2007	FW	(Australia) Luka Glavas	(Australia) Sydney FC	Free	
February 2007	MF	(New Zealand) Adrian Webster	(Australia) Blacktown City Demons	Free	
March 2007	FW	(Australia) Mimi Saric	(Australia) Campbelltown City	Free	
March 2007	MF	(Australia) Josip Magdic	(Australia) Floreat Athena	Free	
March 2007	DF	(Australia) Ante Kovacevic	(Australia) Floreat Athena	Free	
21 May 2007	MF	(New Zealand) Jeremy Christie	(New Zealand) Wellington Phoenix	Free	
July 2007	MF	(Australia) Mark Robertson	(Hungary) FC Sopron	Free	

=== Mid-Season Transfers ===
Date	Pos.	Name	From	Fee	Ref.
15 November 2007	FW	(Australia) Ante Kovacevic	(Australia) Floreat Athena	Short-Term Injury Loan (2 Weeks)	
15 November 2007	MF	(England) Mark Lee	(Australia) ECU Joondalup	Short-Term Injury Loan (2 Weeks)	
15 November 2007	GK	(Australia) Danny Milosevic	(Australia) Inglewood United	Short-Term Injury Loan (2 Weeks)	
18 November 2007	FW	(Liberia) Jerry Karpeh	(Australia) Floreat Athena	Free	

=== Mid-Season Losses ===
Date	Pos.	Name	To	Fee	Ref.
10 September 2007 & 24 November 2007	GK	(Australia) Danny Milosevic	(Australia) Inglewood United	Loan Return	
3 November 2007	FW	(Croatia) Mate Dragičević	Free agent	Free	
24 November 2007	FW	(Australia) Ante Kovacevic	(Australia) Floreat Athena	Loan Return	
24 November 2007	MF	(England) Mark Lee	(Australia) ECU Joondalup	Loan Return	
16 December 2007	GK	(Australia) Tommi Tomich	(Australia) Western Knights	Loan Return	

== Players ==
=== First team squad ===
Note: Flags indicate national team as defined under FIFA eligibility rules; some limited exceptions apply. Players may hold more than one non-FIFA nationality.

No.	Pos.	Nation	Player
1	GK	AUS	Jason Petkovic
2	DF	AUS	Nikolai Topor-Stanley
3	DF	AUS	David Tarka
4	DF	AUS	Simon Colosimo
5	DF	AUS	Jamie Harnwell
6	DF	AUS	Dino Djulbic
7	MF	AUS	Anthony Danze
8	MF	AUS	David Micevski
9	FW	CRO	Mate Dragičević
10	MF	AUS	Billy Celeski
11	MF	AUS	Stan Lazaridis
12	MF	NZL	Leo Bertos
13	FW	AUS	Nikita Rukavytsya
14	DF	AUS	Jamie Coyne
15	MF	AUS	Mitchell Prentice

No.	Pos.	Nation	Player
16	MF	AUS	Nick Rizzo
17	DF	AUS	Jimmy Downey
18	DF	AUS	Hayden Foxe
19	MF	AUS	Naum Sekulovski
20	GK	AUS	Aleks Vrteski
21	FW	ENG	James Robinson
22	FW	LBR	Jerry Karpeh
24	MF	AUS	Jordan Simpson
25	DF	AUS	Tyler Simpson
26	DF	AUS	Mark Lee
27	DF	AUS	Ante Kovacevic
30	GK	AUS	Tando Velaphi
40	GK	AUS	Danny Milosevic
50	GK	AUS	Tommi Tomich

== Friendlies ==
Malaysian Tour

Perth Glory began their pre-season with three preseason friendlies in Malaysia. Firstly the team defeated Selangor PKNS 3-0 with goals to David Tarka, Naum Sekulovski and Anthony Danze. Perth then moved on to sweep Perak FA 4-0 with a brace to both Nikita Rukavytsya and Jamie Harnwell. Finally, Perth defeated Penang FA 5-1 with another brace to Rukavytsya and goals to Nick Rizzo, Danze and Mate Dragičević.

Local Friendlies

Following the tour of Malaysia, the Perth Glory squad was hit hard by injuries and illness, ahead of a planned series of games against Football West State League sides. Nikolai Topor-Stanley was granted leave due to personal issues, while Mate Dragičević was forced to return to Croatia as a result of visa complications. With only twelve players to call on, Perth Glory succumbed to a 2-1 defeat to Perth SC, with Rukavytsya scoring early in the second half. Perth Glory postponed the remaining friendlies, citing the depletion of their playing stocks.

== Pre-Season Cup ==
Round	Date	Home team	Score	Away team	Crowd	Stadium
1	14 July 2007	Newcastle Jets	0 - 1	Perth Glory	2,700	Port Macquarie Regional Stadium
2	20 July 2007	Adelaide United	1 - 1	Perth Glory	3,513	Hindmarsh Stadium
3	28 July 2007	Perth Glory	2 - 1	Melbourne Victory	2,700	Darwin Football Stadium
SF	4 August 2007	Central Coast Mariners	2 - 3	Perth Glory	5,967	Bluetongue Central Coast Stadium
GF	12 August 2007	Adelaide United	2 - 1	Perth Glory	9,606	Hindmarsh Stadium

Perth Glory began their Pre-Season Cup campaign with a 1-0 victory over Newcastle Jets. Jamie Harnwell scored in the second half. However, Perth's injury problems were compounded with Anthony Danze and David Micevski the latest players to be put out of action. Perth Glory rushed to sign Mitchell Prentice ahead of the match in order to boost their playing stocks.

The following week, Perth Glory drew 1-1 with Adelaide United. Nikita Rukavytsya scored in the 53rd minute after being played through by a Jamie Harnwell backheel. Cássio equalised in the 60th minute via a well-taken freekick. Hayden Foxe and Nikolai Topor-Stanley made their debuts for the Glory, with Foxe substituted in the 73rd minute due to a minor knee complaint.

In the third round Perth Glory staged a come-from-behind victory over Melbourne Victory to win 2-1 in Darwin. Nikita Rukavytsya and Jamie Harnwell were the goalscorers. Perth Glory finished equal with Adelaide United on points and second in the group due to goal difference, despite winning the most games in the group.

Perth Glory progressed to the pre-season grand final with a 2-3 away victory to the Central Coast Mariners. Dragicevic opened the scoring for the Glory, with Nick Mrdja equalising before half-time. Goals to Bertos and Tarka in the second half sealed the victory for the Glory, with Sasho Petrovski scoring a consolation goal deep in injury time.

Once again forced to travel interstate, Perth Glory lost the pre-season cup grand final to Adelaide United. Perth led at half-time through a Leo Bertos strike, but second half goals to Cássio and Bruce Djite saw Adelaide take the pre-season cup.

== 2007-08 Hyundai A-League fixtures ==
26 August 2007	Perth Glory	0 : 0	Newcastle Jets	Members Equity Stadium, Perth
15:00 UTC+8		Report; Summary		Attendance: 8,508; Referee: (Australia) Simon Przydacz

1 September 2007	Melbourne Victory	0 : 0	Perth Glory	Telstra Dome, Melbourne
19:00 UTC+10		Report; Summary		Attendance: 31,545; Referee: (New Zealand) Peter O'Leary

9 September 2007	Perth Glory	0 : 0	Sydney FC	Members Equity Stadium, Perth
15:00 UTC+8		Report; Summary		Attendance: 7,907; Referee: (Australia) Craig Zetter

16 September 2007	Perth Glory	1 : 2	Queensland Roar	Members Equity Stadium, Perth
17:00 UTC+8	Harnwell 14'	Report; Summary	McCloughan 21'; McKay 84'	Attendance: 7,203; Referee: (Australia) Ben Williams

23 September 2007	Central Coast Mariners	1 : 0	Perth Glory	Bluetongue Stadium, Gosford
19:00 UTC+10	Petrovski 80'	Report; Summary		Attendance: 9,274; Referee: (Australia) Craig Zetter

30 September 2007	Wellington Phoenix	4 : 1	Perth Glory	Westpac Stadium, Wellington
17:00 UTC+12	R.Aloisi 14'; Smeltz 42'; Coveny 55'; Lochhead 83'	Report; Summary	Celeski 10'; Djulbic (yellow card) 46' (yellow-red card) 54'	Attendance: 10,127; Referee: (Australia) Peter Green

7 October 2007	Perth Glory	0 : 0	Adelaide United	Members Equity Stadium, Perth
17:00 UTC+8		Report; Summary		Attendance: 6,252; Referee: (Australia) Peter Green

12 October 2007	Perth Glory	3 : 3	Sydney FC	Members Equity Stadium, Perth
20:00 UTC+8	Harnwell 53'; Robinson 59'; Prentice 69'	Report; Summary	Brosque 40', 90+3'; Patrick 72'	Attendance: 6,876; Referee: (Australia) Matthew Breeze

21 October 2007	Melbourne Victory	2 : 1	Perth Glory	Telstra Dome, Melbourne
16:30 UTC+10	Hernandez 24'; Thompson 34'	Report; Summary	Harnwell 42'	Attendance: 25,598; Referee: (Australia) Simon Przydacz

27 October 2007	Queensland Roar	3 : 3	Perth Glory	Suncorp Stadium, Brisbane
19:00 UTC+10	Marcinho 45+3'; Lynch 69' (pen.), 86'	Report; Summary	Moore 18' (o.g.); Harnwell 43'; Coyne 90+3'	Attendance: 16,715; Referee: (Australia) Ben Williams

2 November 2007	Perth Glory	0 : 1	Wellington Phoenix	Members Equity Stadium, Perth
20:00 UTC+9		Report; Summary	Daniel 51'	Attendance: 7,105; Referee: (Australia) Simon Przydacz

9 November 2007	Newcastle Jets	1 : 4	Perth Glory	EnergyAustralia Stadium, Newcastle
20:00 UTC+11	J. Griffiths 49'	Report; Summary	Durante 25' (o.g.); J. Simpson 51'; Rukavytsya 63', 90+1'	Attendance: 8,112; Referee: (Australia) Peter Green

18 November 2007	Perth Glory	0 : 1	Central Coast Mariners	Members Equity Stadium, Perth
19:00 UTC+9		Summary	Owens 13'; Jedinak (yellow card) 83' (yellow-red card) 88'	Attendance: 7,310; Referee: (Australia) Craig Zetter

23 November 2007	Adelaide United	1 : 1	Perth Glory	Hindmarsh Stadium, Adelaide
19:30 UTC+10:30	Alagich 41'	Report; Summary	Harnwell 68'	Attendance: 10,678; Referee: (New Zealand) Peter O'Leary

2 December 2007	Perth Glory	3 : 1	Melbourne Victory	Members Equity Stadium, Perth
17:00 UTC+9	Harnwell 18'; Rukavytsya 27', 46'	Report; Summary	Caceres 38'	Attendance: 8,030; Referee: (Australia) Ben Williams

7 December 2007	Wellington Phoenix	3 : 0	Perth Glory	Westpac Stadium, Wellington
19:00 UTC+12	Smeltz 29' (pen.), 72'; Felipe 32'	Report; Summary	Topor-Stanley (red card) 27'; Harnwell (red card) 74'	Attendance: 8,039; Referee: (Australia) Strebre Delovski

15 December 2007	Sydney FC	2 : 4	Perth Glory	Sydney Football Stadium, Sydney
19:00 UTC+11	Corica 50'; Bridges 90'	Report; Summary	Celeski 34', 35', 77' (pen.); Bertos 49'	Attendance: 12,402; Referee: (New Zealand) Michael Hester

30 December 2007	Perth Glory	1 : 4	Queensland Roar	Members Equity Stadium, Perth
19:00 UTC+9	Rizzo 57'	Report; Summary	Kruse 34'; Reinaldo 42'; Minniecon 59'; McCloughan 74'	Attendance: 9,614; Referee: (Australia) Peter Green

6 January 2008	Perth Glory	1 : 1	Central Coast Mariners	Members Equity Stadium, Perth
19:00 UTC+9	Rukavytsya 69'	Report; Summary	Hutchinson 38'	Attendance: 6,727; Referee: (Australia) Strebre Delovski

13 January 2008	Perth Glory	3 : 2	Adelaide United	Members Equity Stadium, Perth
19:00 UTC+9	Robinson 12'; Rukavytsya 45+1'; Harnwell 62'	Report; Summary	Djité 8'; Dodd 59'	Attendance: 8,025; Referee: (Australia) Ben Williams

18 January 2008	Newcastle Jets	2 : 1	Perth Glory	EnergyAustralia Stadium, Newcastle
20:00 UTC+11	J. Griffiths 22'; Bridge 64'	Report; Summary	Rizzo (red card) 37'; Harnwell 45+2'	Attendance: 16,212; Referee: (New Zealand) Michael Hester

== Home-and-Away Season ==
Pos	Team	Pld	W	D	L	GF	GA	GD	Pts	Qualification
1	Central Coast Mariners	21	10	4	7	30	25	+5	34	Qualification for 2009 AFC Champions League group stage and Finals series (Note: First place qualifies for the 2009 AFC Champions League group stage. Winning the 2008 A-League Grand Final earns qualification for the 2009 AFC Champions League group stage, unless the Grand Final winners are also first place, in which case the Grand Final runner up qualifies.)
2	Newcastle Jets (C)	21	9	7	5	25	21	+4	34	Qualification for 2009 AFC Champions League group stage and Finals series
3	Sydney FC	21	8	8	5	28	24	+4	32	Qualification for 2008 Pan-Pacific Championship and Finals series
4	Queensland Roar	21	8	7	6	25	21	+4	31	Qualification for Finals series
5	Melbourne Victory	21	6	9	6	29	29	0	27	
6	Adelaide United	21	6	8	7	31	29	+2	26	
7	Perth Glory	21	4	8	9	27	34	−7	20	
8	Wellington Phoenix (Note: Wellington Phoenix cannot qualify for the AFC Champions League as they are not recognised as an AFC club.)	21	5	5	11	25	37	−12	20	

Source: ultimatealeague.com
Rules for classification: 1) points; 2) goal difference; 3) number of goals scored.
(C) Champions
