= 2005–06 Perth Glory FC season =

Perth Glory FC
2005–06 season
- Chairman: Nick Tana
- Manager: Steve McMahon (to 7 December 2005); Alan Vest (from 8 December 2005)
- A-League: 5th
- Pre-Season Cup: Runner-up
- World Club Qualifiers: Semi-finals
- Top goalscorer: Bobby Despotovski – 8 Goals
- Highest home attendance: 13,157 v Sydney FC
- Lowest home attendance: 5,033 v Adelaide United
- Average home league attendance: 9,734
- Biggest win: 5–1 v Newcastle United Jets
- Biggest defeat: 0–4 v Central Coast Mariners

The 2005–06 Perth Glory FC season was the club's 9th season since its establishment in 1996. The club competed in the A-League for the 1st time.

== Review ==
In 2005, it was announced that former Liverpool and England star Steve McMahon would be appointed as coach. The new season saw a complete overhaul of the playing squad, with Simon Colosimo and former Sunderland and Leeds striker Brian Deane as key signings. Other notable signings included future young stars Nick Ward and Billy Celeski.

Early results in friendlies against local opposition were not great, but Perth became the first team to defeat Sydney FC, winning 1–0 in the semi-final of the 2005–06 Pre-season Cup before losing in the final 0–1 to the Central Coast Mariners. Perth's woeful recruiting strategy was soon evident with the early departure of star import Brian Deane after seven games. Another McMahon recruit, Northern Ireland junior international Neil Teggart, quit the club prior to the start of the regular season. Deane was replaced by Damian Mori, a former Perth Glory striker. Originally on a three-game temporary contract, after some impressive performances Mori stayed for the rest of the season and finished with seven goals.

However, the club continued to be dogged by problems which would only be later revealed to the public. Steve McMahon was subject to constant media criticism over his coaching style and was accused of nepotism by signing his son, Steve McMahon Jr, who was of questionable talent. Rumours also surfaced that players were planning to stage a revolt against the coach. On 7 December, the club reported that the parties had "amicably" chosen to go separate ways. On 9 December 2005, the club announced that assistant coach Alan Vest would move into the head coach role for the remainder of the season, with striker Damian Mori taking on a dual role as player-coach after being named as his assistant.

The coach's departure was merely a symptom of deeper troubles. Poor performances saw Perth miss out on qualification for the finals for the first time since 1998. Dwindling support from chairman Nick Tana, as he looked to sell his 75% stake in the club, seemed to underpin a general decline in club fortunes. After the Round 20 match against Sydney FC, Alan Vest hinted that the current player group were incapable of achieving anything better and stated that "cliques" had been formed undermining club harmony. To cap off a bad season, Western QBE announced they were withdrawing as major sponsor after being associated with the club for 8 years.

== Players ==
=== First team squad ===
Note: Flags indicate national team as defined under FIFA eligibility rules; some limited exceptions apply. Players may hold more than one non-FIFA nationality.

No.	Pos.	Nation	Player
1	GK	AUS	Jason Petkovic
2	DF	AUS	Matt Horsley
3	DF	AUS	David Tarka
4	MF	AUS	Simon Colosimo
5	DF	AUS	Jamie Harnwell
6	DF	ENG	Steve McMahon Jr
7	MF	AUS	Scott Miller
8	MF	AUS	Nick Ward
10	FW	AUS	Bobby Despotovski
11	FW	NIR	Neil Teggart
12	MF	JPN	Hiroyuki Ishida
13	DF	AUS	Ante Kovacevic

No.	Pos.	Nation	Player
14	DF	AUS	Jamie Coyne
15	MF	AUS	Billy Celeski
16	FW	ENG	Brian Deane
17	FW	ENG	Stuart Young
18	FW	SOL	Henry Fa'arodo
19	MF	AUS	Naum Sekulovski
20	GK	SCG	Milan Jovanic
21	MF	AUS	Adrian Caceres
22	FW	AUS	Damian Mori
23	DF	NZL	Danny Hay
24	DF	AUS	Ryan Townsend
25	MF	AUS	David Micevski
26	MF	AUS	Brendan Ross

== Matches ==
=== 2005–06 A-League fixtures ===
26 August 2005 Round 1	Perth Glory	0 : 1	Central Coast Mariners	Members Equity Stadium, Perth
20:00 UTC+8		Report; Summary	Spencer 66'	Attendance: 11,113; Referee: (Australia) Ben Williams

4 September 2005 Round 2	Melbourne Victory	2 : 2	Perth Glory	Olympic Park Stadium, Melbourne
17:00 UTC+10	Kitzbichler 11'; Muscat 85' (pen.)	Report; Summary	Caceres 40'; Despotovski 56'	Attendance: 17,960; Referee: (Australia) Matthew Breeze

10 September 2005 Round 3	Perth Glory	2 : 1	Queensland Roar	Members Equity Stadium, Perth
19:35 UTC+8	Despotovski 54', 72'	Report; Summary	Moon 76'	Attendance: 8,509; Referee: (Australia) Simon Przydacz

17 September 2005 Round 4	Perth Glory	1 : 2	Adelaide United	Members Equity Stadium, Perth
19:35 UTC+8	Valkanis 20' (o.g.)	Report; Summary	Aloisi 32'; Qu 65'; Beltrame (red card) 67'	Attendance: 8,052; Referee: (Australia) Matthew Breeze

22 September 2005 Round 5	New Zealand Knights	0 : 1	Perth Glory	North Harbour Stadium, Auckland
20:00 UTC+12		Report; Summary	Harnwell 68'	Attendance: 4,138; Referee: (Australia) Neil Fox

1 October 2005 Round 6	Perth Glory	1 : 2	Sydney FC	Members Equity Stadium, Perth
19:35 UTC+8	Despotovski 40'	Report; Summary	Petrovski 48'; Yorke 65'	Attendance: 13,157; Referee: (Australia) Matthew Breeze

8 October 2005 Round 7	Newcastle Jets	1 : 5	Perth Glory	EnergyAustralia Stadium, Newcastle
19:30 UTC+10	Parisi 72'	Report; Summary	Mori 33', 62'; Harnwell 46'; Despotovski 52'; Sekulovski 80'	Attendance: 5,868; Referee: (Australia) James Lewis

16 October 2005 Round 8	Central Coast Mariners	4 : 0	Perth Glory	Bluetongue Stadium, Gosford
17:00 UTC+10	Petrie 14', 48'; Heffernan 85'; Spencer 90+3'	Report; Summary		Attendance: 6,494; Referee: (Australia) Ben Williams

23 October 2005 Round 9	Perth Glory	2 : 1	Melbourne Victory	Members Equity Stadium, Perth
17:00 UTC+8	Deane 22'; Sekulovski 55'	Report; Summary	Thompson 39'	Attendance: 12,312; Referee: (Australia) Mark Shield

29 October 2005 Round 10	Queensland Roar	0 : 0	Perth Glory	Suncorp Stadium, Brisbane
19:30 UTC+10		Report; Summary		Attendance: 13,685; Referee: (Australia) Simon Przydacz

6 November 2005 Round 11	Adelaide United	2 : 4	Perth Glory	Hindmarsh Stadium, Adelaide
16:30 UTC+10:30	Veart 13' (pen.); Rees 53'	Report; Summary	Mori 9', 34', 45+1'; Despotovski 39' (pen.)	Attendance: 10,868; Referee: (Australia) Ben Williams

11 November 2005 Round 12	Perth Glory	3 : 0	New Zealand Knights	Members Equity Stadium, Perth
	Ward 69'; Sekulovski 25'; Despotovski 12'			Attendance: 9,667; Referee: (Australia) Craig Zetter

19 November 2005 Round 13	Sydney FC	0 : 0	Perth Glory	Aussie Stadium, Sydney
				Attendance: 16,242; Referee: (Australia) Matthew Breeze

25 November 2005 Round 14	Perth Glory	0 : 1	Newcastle Jets	Members Equity Stadium, Perth
			Coveny 47'	Attendance: 7,921; Referee: (Australia) Simon Przydacz

4 December 2005 Round 15	Perth Glory	2 : 2	Central Coast Mariners	Members Equity Stadium, Perth
	Ishida 65'; Ward 54'		Petrie 12'; Hutchinson 8'	Attendance: 7,428; Referee: (Australia) Mark Shield

29 December 2005 Round 16	Melbourne Victory	2 : 2	Perth Glory	Olympic Park Stadium, Melbourne
	Allsopp 45'; Thompson 23'		Ward 67'; Mori 5'	Attendance: 14,754; Referee: (New Zealand) Peter O'Leary

7 January 2006 Round 17	Perth Glory	0 : 2	Queensland Roar	Members Equity Stadium, Perth
			Baird 80'; Reinaldo 10'	Attendance: 11,087; Referee: (Australia) Peter Green

12 January 2006 Round 18	Perth Glory	1 : 2	Adelaide United	Members Equity Stadium, Perth
	Ward 86'		Aloisi 71'; Qu 3'	Attendance: 5,033; Referee: (Australia) Matthew Breeze

19 January 2006 Round 19	New Zealand Knights	1 : 4	Perth Glory	North Harbour Stadium, Auckland
	Emblen 7'		Harnwell 78'; Coyne 14'; Sekulovski 11', 42'	Attendance: 3,024; Referee: (Australia) Neil Fox

29 January 2006 Round 20	Perth Glory	1 : 2	Sydney FC	Members Equity Stadium, Perth
	Despotovski 53'		Zadkovich 23'; Rudan 14'	Attendance: 12,796; Referee: (Australia) Craig Zetter

5 February 2006 Round 21	Newcastle Jets	1 : 3	Perth Glory	EnergyAustralia Stadium, Newcastle
	Coveny 34'		Mori 71'; Picken 58' (o.g.); Ward 9'	Attendance: 9,232; Referee: (Australia) Matthew Breeze

=== Ladder ===
Pos	Team	Pld	W	D	L	GF	GA	GD	Pts	Qualification
1	Adelaide United	21	13	4	4	33	25	+8	43	Qualification for 2007 AFC Champions League group stage and Finals series
2	Sydney FC (C)	21	10	6	5	35	28	+7	36	Qualification for 2007 AFC Champions League group stage and Finals series
3	Central Coast Mariners	21	8	8	5	35	28	+7	32	Qualification for Finals series
4	Newcastle Jets	21	9	4	8	27	29	−2	31	Qualification for Finals series
5	Perth Glory	21	8	5	8	34	29	+5	29	
6	Queensland Roar	21	7	7	7	27	22	+5	28	
7	Melbourne Victory	21	7	5	9	26	24	+2	26	
8	New Zealand Knights (Note: New Zealand Knights cannot qualify for the AFC Champions League as they are not recognised as an AFC club.)	21	1	3	17	15	47	−32	6	

Source: ultimatealeague.com
Rules for classification: 1) points; 2) goal difference; 3) number of goals scored.
(C) Champions

== Awards ==
=== Perth Glory Most Glorious Player ===
2005/06 A-League – Bobby Despotovski
