= Leo Bertos =

New Zealand footballer (born 1981)

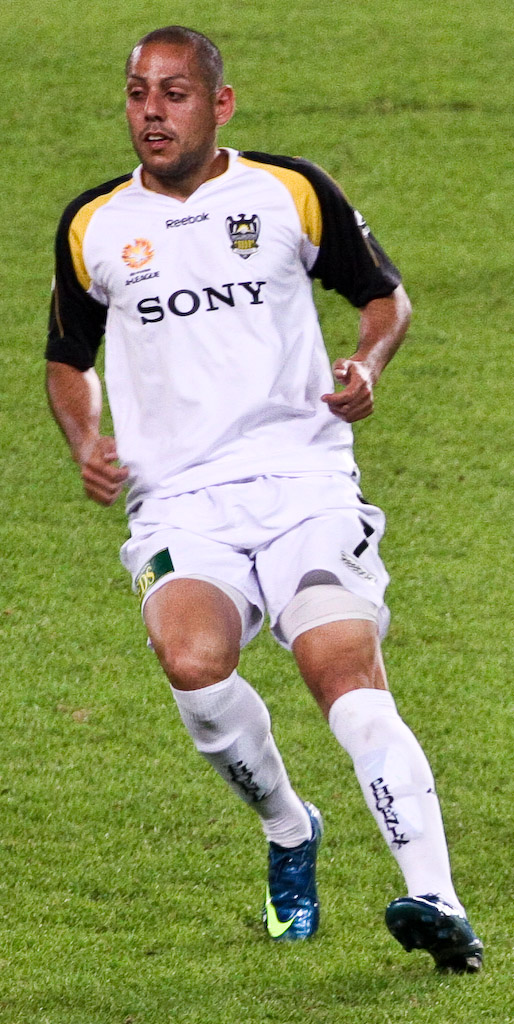
- Bertos playing for Wellington Phoenix in 2008

Personal information
- Full name: Leonida Christos Bertos
- Date of birth: 20 December 1981 (age 44)
- Place of birth: Wellington, New Zealand
- Height: 1.77 m (5 ft 10 in)
- Position: Winger

Senior career*
Years	Team	Apps	(Gls)
1997–2000	Wellington Olympic	53	
2000–2003	Barnsley	12	(1)
2003–2005	Rochdale	82	(13)
2005	Chester City	5	(0)
2005	Barrow		
2005–2006	York City	5	(0)
2006	Scarborough	1	(0)
2006	Worksop Town		
2006–2008	Perth Glory	35	(1)
2008–2014	Wellington Phoenix	127	(9)
2014–2015	East Bengal	11	(0)
2014	→ NorthEast United (loan)	4	(0)
2015–2018	Hamilton Olympic	40	(9)

International career
2003–2004	New Zealand U23	5	(1)
2003–2013	New Zealand	56	(0)
2014–	New Zealand Futsal	2	(1)

Managerial career
- 2020–: Weston Bears
- * Club domestic league appearances and goals

Leonida Christos Bertos (born 20 December 1981) is a New Zealand football coach and former player who is the head coach of Northern NSW NPL side Weston Bears. A winger, he was a New Zealand international from 2003 to 2013, representing his country at the 2010 FIFA World Cup.

== Early life ==
Bertos was born in Wellington, to a Greek father and a New Zealand Māori mother. He attended Holy Cross primary school (1987–1994) and Wellington College (1995–1999) where he played for the school's first XI.

Bertos played for Wellington Olympic in the New Zealand domestic league between 1997 and 2000.

== Club career ==
=== Barnsley ===
Bertos started his career in England, playing in Barnsley's youth system. He made his debut for the Barnsley reserve team against Rotherham United in October 2000 and his first-team debut for Barnsley in a 0–4 defeat to Preston North End on 16 April 2001. Bertos signed a professional contract for the club a day later. He picked up a knee injury whilst playing in Tenerife, the results of which required a second opinion. These results were delayed, but, when received, it was confirmed that no meniscus was present to his tendon. He scored once for Barnsley; in a 4–1 defeat to Bristol City.

=== Rochdale ===
He had a reasonably successful two-year spell at Rochdale scoring the goal in a 1–0 win at Kidderminster that secured the team's League status in 2003–04, but fell out of favour the following year and was released.

=== Chester City ===
After failing to impress in a short spell at Chester City Bertos played non-league football for Barrow, York City, Scarborough and Worksop Town.

=== Perth Glory ===
Bertos signed for A-League franchise Perth Glory for the start of the 2006–07 season on a two-year contract. Bertos' signing was an attempt to add depth to a Perth midfield that lacked consistency and strength in 2005–06. Bertos replaced star midfield player Nick Ward. Starting all 21 matches of the regular season, Bertos' pace, ability to beat his man, and dangerous crosses from wide areas, resulted in nine assists in his debut season, making him the highest assisting player in the league. Fans bemoaned the fact he failed to find the back of the net given the number of good scoring opportunities.

Bertos explored new opportunities during the A-League off-season. Glory manager Ron Smith allowed him to trial with Greek club Skoda Xanthi, however the trial was unsuccessful and Bertos returned to Perth in time for the start of the 2007–08 season.

During the 2007–08 season Bertos made fourteen appearances for the club and scored one goal and had two assists.

=== Wellington Phoenix ===
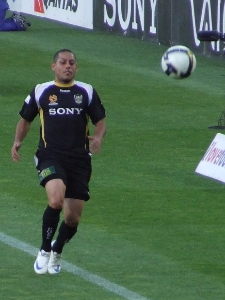
Bertos playing for Wellington Phoenix in 2009

On 24 January 2008, Bertos was signed on a free transfer by his hometown club Wellington Phoenix on a two-year contract. He made his club debut in the opening game of the 2008–09 season against Brisbane Roar. Bertos scored his first goal for Wellington against Sydney on 7 November 2008. He played in 16 of the 21 regular season matches making 14 starts with 2 goals and 4 assists. Bertos was named Wellington Phoenix Player of the Year for 2008–09.

The 2009–10 season was incredibly successful for Bertos and the Phoenix. Bertos played a central role during the regular season to ensure a first finals appearance for the club. He played every game of the season, starting 23 of the 28 matches, scoring 2 goals and providing 8 assists. He holds the all-time leading assists record for the club with 12. On 1 October 2009 he signed a three-year contract extension. On 13 April 2014, the Phoenix announced he would be leaving the club.

=== East Bengal ===
On 19 July 2014, he signed for Indian club East Bengal FC for a two-year contract. On the virtue of playing in 2010 FIFA World Cup, he qualifies as the marquee player of the club. He was issued the number 11 jersey. He made his debut in a CFL match against Techno Aryan on 23 August 2014, coming as a substitute for Mehtab Hussain.

=== NorthEast United ===
As the Indian Super League started, Bertos joined the competition by going on loan to NorthEast United. There he reunited with his former coach at national team Ricki Herbert.

=== Hamilton Olympic ===
Bertos signed for Australian National Premier Leagues side Hamilton Olympic for the 2016 season after training for several weeks with Newcastle Jets.

== International career ==
Bertos made his international debut against Iran on 13 October 2003 and has represented New Zealand over 50 times since. He has also represented New Zealand at under-23 level.

Bertos is known for his dribbling and quality skills on the ball. This was shown in the New Zealand vs Brazil game in which he dribbled around two defenders to win a corner. He also played many one-twos and did a drag-back once in the second half. In the first game of the New Zealand vs Malaysia series (which New Zealand won 1–0), Bertos received the Man of the Match award for his magnificent dribbling performance and domination of the Malaysian defence.

He represented New Zealand at the 2009 FIFA Confederations Cup in South Africa. He provided the assist for New Zealand's first two goals against World Champions Italy in a 4–3 friendly loss in Pretoria prior to the Confederations Cup.

=== 2010 FIFA World Cup ===
In Wellington on 14 November 2009, Bertos provided the assist and delivered the corner from which Rory Fallon headed a thumping game winner against Bahrain to give New Zealand the two-legged aggregate win needed to secure a spot at the 2010 FIFA World Cup.

Bertos was on hand to see the World Cup trophy unveiled on New Zealand soil for the first time, when it made an eight-hour stop-over in Auckland on 27 April 2010 on its worldwide tour before the 2010 World Cup in South Africa.

On 10 May 2010 Bertos was named as one of eight midfielders in the final 23-man squad to travel to the 2010 FIFA World Cup in June. The squad played several official warm-up internationals against Australia, Serbia, Slovenia and Chile before the World Cup.

Bertos played in all three games at the World Cup, putting in gritty performances to earn New Zealand a 1–1 draw with Slovakia, a 1–1 draw with reigning world champions Italy, and their final 0–0 draw with Paraguay.

=== Futsal ===
Bertos was named in the New Zealand Futsal squad to play Australia in a three match series in July 2014 scoring a goal in his debut for the side

== Management career ==
Bertos was named the coach of Weston Bears in January 2020 after former manager Kew Jaliens flagged an intention to return to Europe.

== Career statistics ==
=== Club ===
As of match played 30 May 2015

Appearances and goals by club, season and competition
Club	Season	League			National Cup		League Cup		Other		Total	
Club	Season	Division	Apps	Goals	Apps	Goals	Apps	Goals	Apps	Goals	Apps	Goals
Barnsley	2000–01	First Division	2	0	0	0	0	0	—		2	0
Barnsley	2001–02	First Division	4	0	1	0	0	0	—		5	0
Barnsley	2002–03	Second Division	6	1	0	0	0	0	—		6	1
Barnsley	Total		12	1	1	0	0	0	—		13	1
Rochdale	2003–04	Third Division	40	9	1	1	1	0	1 (Note: Appearance in Football League Trophy)	0	43	10
Rochdale	2004–05	League Two	42	4	3	0	0	0	1	0	46	4
Rochdale	Total		82	13	4	1	1	0	2	0	89	14
Chester City	2005–06	League Two	5	0	—		1	0	1	0	7	0
York City	2005–06	Conference National	5	0	—		—		1 (Note: Appearance in FA Trophy)	0	6	0
Scarborough	2005–06	Conference National	1	0	—		—		—		1	0
Perth Glory	2006–07	A-League	21	0	—		—		—		21	0
Perth Glory	2007–08	A-League	14	1	—		—		—		14	1
Perth Glory	Total		35	1	—		—		—		35	1
Wellington Phoenix	2008–09	A-League	16	2	—		—		—		16	2
Wellington Phoenix	2009–10	A-League	30	2	—		—		—		30	2
Wellington Phoenix	2010–11	A-League	22	4	—		—		—		22	4
Wellington Phoenix	2011–12	A-League	28	1	—		—		—		28	1
Wellington Phoenix	2012–13	A-League	24	0	—		—		—		24	0
Wellington Phoenix	2013–14	A-League	7	0	—		—		—		7	0
Wellington Phoenix	Total		127	9	—		—		—		127	9
East Bengal	2014–15	I-League	11	0	—		—		2 (Note: Appearances in AFC Cup)	0	13	0
NorthEast United (loan)	2014	Indian Super League	4	0	—		—		—		4	0
Career total			282	24	5	1	2	0	6	0	295	25

=== International ===
As of match played 13 November 2013

Appearances and goals by national team and year
National team	Year	Apps	Goals
New Zealand	2003	1	0
New Zealand	2004	5	0
New Zealand	2005	1	0
New Zealand	2006	8	0
New Zealand	2007	6	0
New Zealand	2008	1	0
New Zealand	2009	8	0
New Zealand	2010	9	0
New Zealand	2012	11	0
New Zealand	2013	6	0
Total		56	0

== Honours ==
Individual

- Wellington Phoenix Player of the Year: 2008–09
