= Anthony Danze =

Australian footballer (born 1984)

Personal information
- Full name: Anthony Danze
- Date of birth: 15 March 1984 (age 42)
- Place of birth: Perth, Western Australia
- Height: 1.86 m (6 ft 1 in)
- Positions: Attacking midfielder; central midfielder

Youth career
- 1999: ECU Joondalup
- Southampton
- 2000–2001: AIS

Senior career*
Years	Team	Apps	(Gls)
2000–2004	Perth Glory	11	(0)
2004	Inglewood United		
2004–2006	Crystal Palace	0	(0)
2004–2005	→ Milton Keynes Dons (loan)	2	(0)
2006	Inglewood United		
2007	Perth Glory	8	(0)
2011	Balcatta SC		
2016	Perth SC	4	(0)

International career^{‡}
2000–2001	Australia U17	15	(5)
2003	Australia U20	10	(3)
2003	Australia U23	6	(0)
- * Club domestic league appearances and goals as of 16 April 2018 ‡ National team caps and goals as of 4 December 2007

Anthony Danze (born 15 March 1984 in Perth, Western Australia) is an Australian footballer who last played for Perth Glory.

== Club career ==
Danze was playing for his local side ECU Joondalup when talent scouts from Southampton offered him a professional contract. Danze turned down this contract, determined to prove himself in Australia before leaving to play football overseas. Instead he signed for Perth Glory in Australia for the 2000/2001 NSL season as a 16-year-old. Later in 2001 he joined the AIS in Canberra before returning to play for Perth Glory in 2002. During this time Danze played for the under 17 Australian national football team and the under 20 Australian national football team. Danze had success with both of these teams, scoring goals at both World Youth Cup Championships they participated in. The highlight in his international career was scoring two goals in a victory against Brazil at the 2003 FIFA World Youth Championship. Following this success Danze signed for English Premier League club Crystal Palace in September 2004 on a three-year deal and made his debut in a League cup game against Manchester United at Old Trafford. During this time he played for the Australian Olympic Football Team at the 2004 Summer Olympics in Athens, Greece, where Australia were eliminated at the quarter-final stage.

Danze left Crystal Palace during the 2005–06 season on a free transfer due to injury and work permit issues, after spending part the 2004–05 season on loan at Milton Keynes Dons. He returned to Australia where he began working in a tiling & stone business while recovering from injury. He was signed again by Perth Glory on 2 March 2007 before the start of the 2007–08 A-League season along with three other players. Due again to injury issues he left Perth Glory by mutual consent on 13 December 2007. Danze returned to the tiling & stone business, as well as pursuing other business interests.

== Honours ==
With Perth Glory:

- NSL Championship: 2003-2004
