= Jamie Harnwell =

Australian soccer player and coach (born 1977)

Personal information
- Full name: Jamie Richard Harnwell
- Date of birth: 21 July 1977 (age 49)
- Place of birth: Perth, Western Australia
- Height: 1.88 m (6 ft 2 in)
- Positions: Centre-forward; centre-back

Youth career
- 1996: Sorrento FC

Senior career*
Years	Team	Apps	(Gls)
1996	Sorrento FC	10	(2)
1997	Olympic Kingsway	0	(0)
1998	Sorrento FC	21	(12)
1998–2011	Perth Glory	256	(44)
2008	→ FC Vaduz (loan)	12	(0)
2011–2013	Sorrento FC		(16)

Managerial career
- 2011–2014: Perth Glory Women
- 2014–2021: Sorrento FC
- 2015–2016: Adelaide United Women
- 2017–2021: Western Australia
- * Club domestic league appearances and goals as of 4 February 2011

Jamie Richard Harnwell (born 21 July 1977 in Perth, Western Australia) is a retired Australian football (soccer) player and current CEO of Football West. He holds the record for most appearances for Perth Glory, with 256 league appearances to his name.

== Club career ==
=== Perth Glory ===
Jaime Harnwell joined Perth Glory in 1998 from Western Australia State League side Sorrento FC and quickly joined the starting eighteen.

In 2003 Harnwell had a one-month contract with Leyton Orient in Football League Two, which was not extended. He then played a game for Welling United at Southern Football League Premier Division. At the end of the 2003 English football season, Harnwell returned to Perth and rejoined the Perth Glory. After playing with the Glory in the 2003/2004 season of the National Soccer League, the NSL was disbanded, and Harnwell had the option to continue his career overseas in England. Harnwell played for Western Australian State League club Sorrento FC with his younger brother Todd while he waited for the A-League to begin.

Harnwell was named as team captain for the inaugural A-League season. Harnwell skippered the side until the 2007/08 season, when the captaincy was taken on by Simon Colosimo.

During the 2006/07 A-League season, Glory coach Ron Smith used Harnwell in a striking capacity and Harnwell scored the opening goal in the 2–1 win over Newcastle Jets. On 26 November Harnwell netted the first hat-trick of the A-League season in the 4–1 win against the New Zealand Knights.

On 28 December 2006, following a 0–0 draw with Adelaide United, Harnwell and Glory teammate Adrian Webster had an altercation, with the latter punching Harnwell. Both players were reprimanded by Perth Glory, fined half a week's wages and given a suspended one match ban. Against Adelaide in November 2007, Harnwell played his 200th game for the Glory, the third player to do so after Bobby Despotovski and Scott Miller.

On 14 February 2008, Harnwell moved to Liechtenstein's only professional club, FC Vaduz, and signed a loan contract until the end of season. He played in the Swiss Challenge League.

Harnwell was a part of the 2009/2010 squad that made the Hyundai A-League Finals for the first time in the club's history. The club announced that Harnwell had signed on for the 2010/11 season in April 2010, On 3 October 2010, Harnwell broke Bobby Despotovski's record of 241 appearances for Perth Glory to become the most capped player of all time.

=== Retirement ===
Harnwell retired from professional football after making a record 256 appearances for Perth Glory.

In April 2022, Harnwell became the CEO of Football West.

== A-League career statistics ==
(Correct as of 8 August 2010)

Club	Season	League			Finals			Asia			Total		
Club	Season	Apps	Goals	Assists	Apps	Goals	Assists	Apps	Goals	Assists	Apps	Goals	Assists
Perth Glory	2005–06	21	3	0	-	-	-	-	-	-	21	3	0
Perth Glory	2006–07	21	7	0	-	-	-	-	-	-	21	7	0
Perth Glory	2007–08	17	8	1	-	-	-	-	-	-	17	8	1
Perth Glory	2008–09	18	3	1	-	-	-	-	-	-	18	3	1
Perth Glory	2009–10	12	3	1	-	-	-	-	-	-	12	3	1
Perth Glory	2010–11	21	1	1	-	-	-	-	-	-	21	1	1
Total		91	25	4	-	-	-	-	-	-	91	25	4

== Honours ==
With Perth Glory:

- NSL Championship: 2002–03, 2003–04

Personal honours:

- Perth Glory Member's Player of the Year: 2007–08
