= Andy Petterson =

Australian soccer player (born 1969)

Personal information
- Full name: Andrew Keith Petterson
- Date of birth: 26 September 1969 (age 57)
- Place of birth: Fremantle, Western Australia
- Position: Goalkeeper

Youth career
- East Fremantle Tricolore
- Australian Institute of Sport

Senior career*
Years	Team	Apps	(Gls)
1988–1994	Luton Town	25	(0)
1988	→ Swindon Town (loan)	27	(0)
1993	→ Ipswich Town (loan)	1	(0)
1994–1999	Charlton Athletic	85	(0)
1994	→ Bradford City (loan)	3	(0)
1995	→ Ipswich Town (loan)	1	(0)
1996	→ Plymouth Argyle (loan)	6	(0)
1996	→ Colchester United (loan)	5	(0)
1998–1999	→ Portsmouth (loan)	13	(0)
1999–2002	Portsmouth	32	(0)
2000	→ Wolverhampton Wanderers (loan)	0	(0)
2001	→ Torquay United (loan)	6	(0)
2002	West Bromwich Albion	0	(0)
2002	Brighton & Hove Albion	7	(0)
2002–2003	Derry City	6	(0)
2003	AFC Bournemouth	0	(0)
2003	Rushden & Diamonds	0	(0)
2003–2004	Southend United	1	(0)
2004	Walsall	3	(0)
2004–2005	Notts County	0	(0)
2005	Farnborough Town	4	(0)
2005–2006	Newcastle Jets	0	(0)
2006	Perth Glory	1	(0)
2007–2010	ECU Joondalup	75	(0)
Total		280	(0)

International career
1987–1988	Australia U-20	3	(0)
- * Club domestic league appearances and goals

Andrew Keith Petterson (born 26 September 1969) is an Australian former soccer player and coach who is a goalkeeping coach for East Bengal.

As a player he was a goalkeeper who played most of his career in England and notably played in the Premier League for Charlton Athletic, where he was part of the side that won promotion to the top flight in 1998. He was also Charlton's player of the season for the 1996/97 campaign. He also played in the Football League for Luton Town, Swindon Town, Ipswich Town, Bradford City, Plymouth Argyle, Colchester United, Portsmouth, Wolverhampton Wanderers, Torquay United, West Bromwich Albion, Brighton & Hove Albion, AFC Bournemouth, Rushden & Diamonds, Southend United, Walsall and Notts County. He also had a spell in Ireland with Derry City and a brief period with English non-league side Farnborough Town. In 2005, seventeen years into his career he finally joined an Australian side by joining Newcastle Jets. He later played for Perth Glory and ECU Joondalup before retiring in 2010. He was capped three times by Australia U-20.

Since retiring Petterson has worked as a goalkeeping coach for ECU Joondalup, Bali United, PSIS Semarang, Ilocos United FC and Perth Glory, before joining East Bengal in 2022.

== Playing career ==
Petterson began his career in his native Australia, leaving East Fremantle Tricolore in 1988 to join the Australian Institute of Sport in Canberra. In November 1988 he left Australia to join English side Luton Town. He spent time with Swindon Town and Ipswich Town, where he became the first Western Australian-born player to appear in the newly formed Premier League in a 2–1 win over Nottingham Forest before joining Charlton Athletic in July 1994 for a fee of £85,000.

He was third-choice keeper for most of the 1994–95 and 1995–96 seasons, behind Mike Salmon and American Mike Ammann, spending time on loan with Bradford City, Ipswich Town, Plymouth Argyle and Colchester United. However, with both Salmon and Ammann injured towards the end of the 1995–96 season, Petterson played well enough in the final nine games, conceding only five goals and helping the club to the play off Semi Finals, to earn a new contract. He began the following season as Salmon's deputy, but after his return to the side in January 1997 became first choice, winning the club's player of the year award at the end of the season. The start of the 1997–98 season saw Petterson as Charlton's first choice keeper, but after 26 appearances lost his place to first Salmon and then Sasa Ilic as Charlton Athletic gained promotion to the Premier League via a Wembley play-off final win over Sunderland. Petterson started the 1998-99 Premier League season for Charlton Athletic as deputy to Ilic and made his first appearance as a substitute in a 2–1 loss to Chelsea at Stamford Bridge. He then started the next game as the Addicks defeated West Ham United 4–2 at the Valley. Petterson again returned to the substitute's bench after Ilic was declared fit before he was allowed to join Portsmouth on loan in November 1998 as cover for Alan Knight. Petterson stayed until February, helping Pompey survive relegation in 1999 before returning to an unsuccessful relegation battle for Charlton Athletic as the South London club returned to the Championship after just one season in the top flight.

Petterson signed for Portsmouth on a free transfer in July 1999 as Alan Ball looked to strengthen his squad after the club's take over. Petterson was a regular under Ball, but with the managers dismissal from the club in November he struggled to establish himself at Fratton Park and had loan spells with Wolverhampton Wanderers (February to May 2000) and Torquay United (March to April 2001). Following a calf injury in pre-season, Petterson failed to make the Pompey first team at all in the 2001–02 season, being behind Dave Beasant and Japan National Team GK Yoshi Kawaguchi in the pecking order and was allowed to join West Bromwich Albion on a free transfer in March 2002. At the Hawthorns he was understudy to Russell Hoult, as he had been at Portsmouth, and although failed to make the first team appearance he was part of the Baggies squad who gained promotion to the Premier League after finishing as runners-up in the Championship. He was released at the end of the season., and then joined Championship new boys Brighton & Hove Albion in August 2002. He was released by Brighton in December 2002 and later played in the League of Ireland for Derry City until being released in April 2003.

He moved on to AFC Bournemouth in December 2003 and to Rushden & Diamonds in September 2004 on non-contract terms. However, Petterson joined Southend United a week later, playing just once before a free transfer move to Walsall in January 2004.

On his Walsall debut Petterson conceded six goals, and went on to play a further two games. Walsall were relegated at the end of the season, and Petterson was subsequently released in May 2004.

Petterson joined Notts County on a short-term deal in December 2004, but was released at the end of January 2005. Two months later he joined Conference National side Farnborough Town.

== Coaching career ==
Petterson holds both his AFF/AFC B Licence and AFC GK A Diploma Licence. He returned to Australia, joining A-League outfit Newcastle United Jets as player / Goalkeeper coach for the inaugural season in 2005 before returning to Perth to play for semi professional outfit ECU Joondalup. He became the club's Technical Director in 2013 as part of the club's acceptance into National Premier Leagues WA. He has also worked as coach for Indonesian side Bali United after holding a similar position at PSIS Semarang. India 2022/23 East Bengal - Indian Super League,and China 2025 with Jiangsu Wuxi in the Chinese Womens Super League.

He was previously the head goalkeeper coach and assistant Coach at Ilocos United FC who competed in the inaugural Season of the Philippine Football League in 2017, as well as holding similar positions at Perth Glory FC. He was inducted into the Western Australian Football Hall of Fame 2016.
