= Nikita Rukavytsya =

Australian soccer player

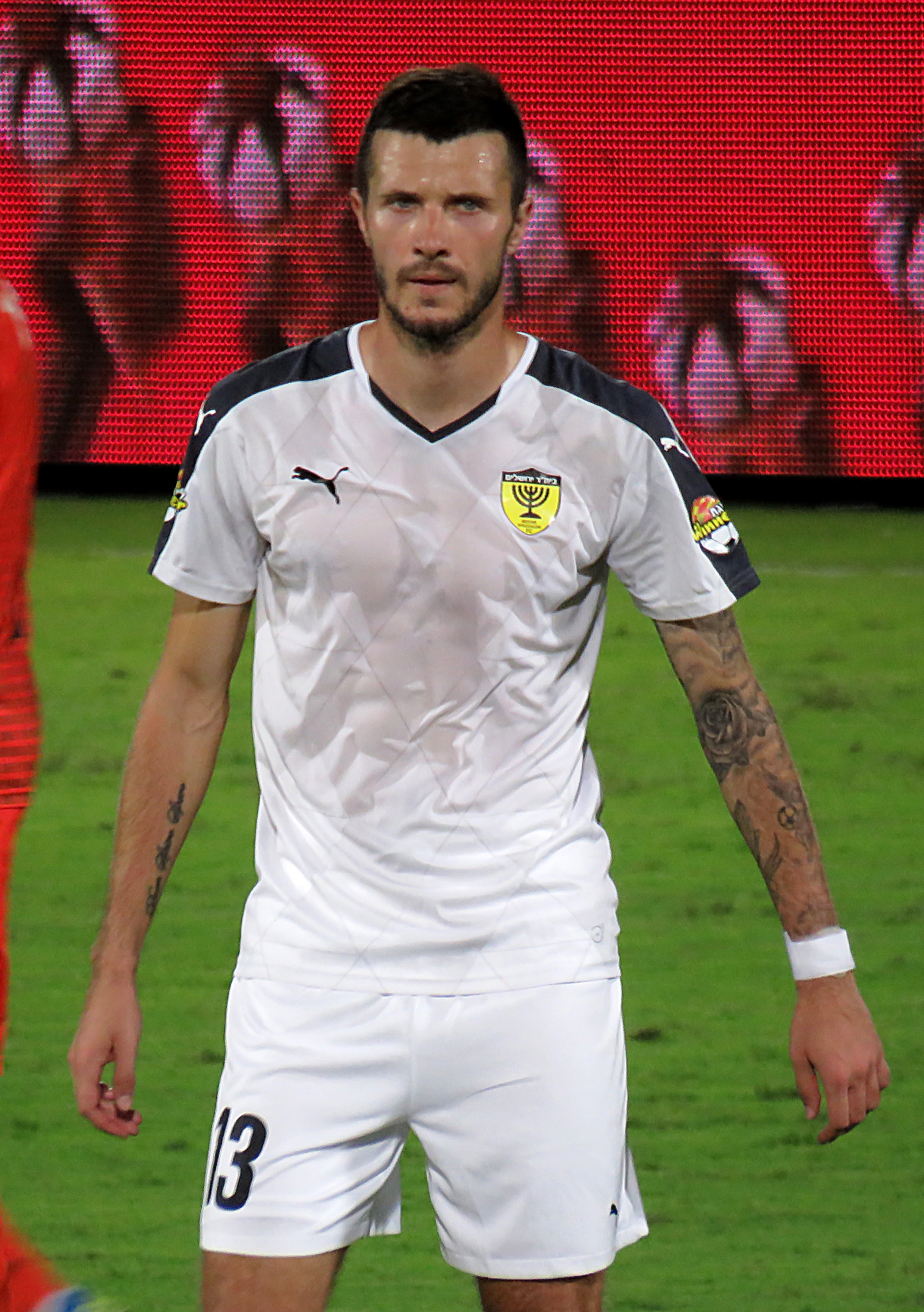
- Rukavytsya playing for Beitar Jerusalem in 2015

Personal information
- Full name: Nikita Vadymovych Rukavytsya
- Date of birth: 22 June 1987 (age 39)
- Place of birth: Mykolayiv, Ukrainian SSR, Soviet Union (now in Ukraine)
- Height: 1.85 m (6 ft 1 in)
- Positions: Winger; forward

Youth career
- 2000: Torpedo Mykolaiv
- 2001–2003: Inglewood United
- 2003–2004: Perth SC
- 2005–2006: AIS

Senior career*
Years	Team	Apps	(Gls)
2007–2009	Perth Glory	42	(16)
2009–2010	Twente	5	(0)
2010	→ Roeselare (loan)	9	(4)
2010–2012	Hertha BSC	56	(5)
2012–2014	Mainz 05	8	(0)
2013	Mainz 05 II	2	(0)
2013–2014	→ FSV Frankfurt (loan)	19	(2)
2014–2015	Western Sydney Wanderers	23	(3)
2015–2016	Beitar Jerusalem	30	(14)
2016–2021	Maccabi Haifa	152	(64)
2021–2022	Hapoel Be'er Sheva	28	(10)
2022–2023	Maccabi Haifa	18	(1)
2023–2024	Western United	15	(2)
Total		407	(121)

International career
2006	Australia U20	1	(0)
2008	Australia U23	13	(1)
2009–2021	Australia	23	(1)
- * Club domestic league appearances and goals

Nikita Vadymovych Rukavytsya (/nɪˈkiːtə rʊkəˈvɪtsə/ nih-KEET-ə ruu-kə-VIT-sə; Ukrainian: Микита Вадимович Рукавиця, romanized: Mykyta Vadymovych Rukavytsya; born 22 June 1987) is a retired professional soccer player. Born in Ukraine, he played for the Australia national team.

== Early and personal life ==
Rukavytsya was born in Mykolayiv, in the then Ukrainian SSR of the Soviet Union; his family moved to Australia when he was 14 years old, settling in Perth. He played junior football for Inglewood United and Perth SC in the Football West State League while attending Mount Lawley Senior High School, before being offered a spot at the Australian Institute of Sport on a football scholarship.

Rukavytsya's wife is Israeli; hence, he obtained Israeli residency status in August 2016.

== Club career ==
Rukavytsya joined Perth Glory on a short-term replacement deal in the latter stages of the 2006–07 A-League season, making three appearances for the club. In March 2007, he signed a contract with the Glory to keep him at the club until the end of the 2008–09 A-League season.

After an excellent pre-season, the start of the 2007–08 A-League season was difficult for both Rukavytsya and Perth Glory. However, with the departure of coach Ron Smith, Rukavytsya turned his form around starting by scoring two goals against the Newcastle Jets in David Mitchell's first game as coach and another two goals against Melbourne Victory at home on 2 December 2007. By the end of the 2007–08 A-League season, Rukavytsya managed to score six goals in the last eight games of the campaign.

In April 2008 he was invited to trial with Hannover 96 in Germany. It ultimately proved unsuccessful, and he returned to Perth Glory for the start of the 2008–09 season.

In January 2009, he undertook a week-long trial at Dutch club FC Twente. After the last game of the 2008–09 A-League season, it was announced that he would officially be transferring to FC Twente in a transfer deal rumoured to be worth A$1.2 Million.

Rukavytsya scored his first goal for FC Twente in the club's 8–0 Dutch Cup drubbing of SC Joure. On 8 January 2010, KSV Roeselare signed the Australian forward on loan until the end of the season.

On 14 July 2010, Rukavytsya signed for 2. Bundesliga side Hertha BSC. His first season in the 2. Bundesliga was quite successful. He was a regular starter, scored four goals and ended the season with 12 assists, the second most in the league. At season's end, Hertha BSC were promoted back to the Bundesliga and he hoped to feature again for the newly promoted team.

On 31 August, Nikita signed with Bundesliga club Mainz 05 for a reported fee of €1 million, just hours before the transfer cut-off. His last appearance for Berlin was 72 minutes against Jahn Regensburg in the 2. Bundesliga on 24 August 2012.

Rukavytsya joined Frankfurt on a year-long loan deal in August 2013, after failing to break into the Mainz first eleven.

On 12 October 2014, it was announced that Rukavytsya had returned to Australia to sign for the Western Sydney Wanderers. He made his debut in round 3 against Wellington Phoenix. His first goal for the Wanderers came in round 16 against Wellington Phoenix.

In September 2015, Rukavytsya signed for Israeli side Beitar Jerusalem.

On 8 June 2016, after one season with Beitar Jerusalem, Rukavytsya joined Maccabi Haifa on a three-year deal worth €400,000 per season.

After an unsuccessful 2016–17 season, the following season he scored nine goals in the first five months, including the final goal in a 3–0 cup win over rivals Maccabi Tel Aviv.

In the 2019–20 season, Rukavytsya finished top goal scorer in the league with a total of 22 goals.

In the 2020–21 season, Maccabi Haifa won the league and Rukavytsya again won the golden boot with a total of 19 goals in the league.

In March 2022, Rukavytsya became the leading foreign goalscorer in the Israeli Premier League.

== International career ==
While eligible to play for Ukraine, he decided to play for Australia and in 2008, represented Australia in the Australian U-23's Olympic Team at the 2008 Summer Olympics, locking his commitment to Australia.

After a good end to the 2007–08 season, he earned himself a place in the Olyroos squad for the Beijing Olympics and a Socceroos call-up.

Rukavytsya scored in a warm-up game for the Olyroos against Adelaide United. He also scored his first international goal for the Australian U-23's, in their 3–0 win over Croatian U-21's at the Intercontinental Cup in Malaysia on 16 May 2008.

Rukavytsya was named in Pim Verbeek's 23-man squad for the 2010 World Cup in South Africa. He made two appearances off the bench for the Socceroos.

Rukavytsya scored his first international goal in a friendly against South Korea on 14 November 2012, Australia won 2–1.

In May 2018, he was named in Australia's preliminary 26-man squad for the 2018 FIFA World Cup in Russia.

On 7 June 2021, Rukavytsya came on as a substitute in a World Cup Qualifier against Taiwan.

== Career statistics ==
=== Club ===
As of match played 2 March 2024

Appearances and goals by club, season and competition
Club	Season	Domestic	League		National cup (Note: Includes KNVB Cup, Belgian Cup, DFB-Pokal, Israel State Cup)		League cup (Note: Includes Toto Cup)		Continental		Other		Total	
Club	Season	Domestic	Apps	Goals	Apps	Goals	Apps	Goals	Apps	Goals	Apps	Goals	Apps	Goals
Perth Glory	2006–07	A-League	3	0	–		–		–		–		3	0
Perth Glory	2007–08	A-League	20	6	–		–		–		5 (Note: Appearances in A-League Pre-Season Challenge Cup)	2	20	6
Perth Glory	2008–09	A-League	19	10	–		–		–		–		19	10
Perth Glory	Total		42	16	–		–		–		5	2	47	18
FC Twente	2008–09	Eredivisie	3	0	0	0	–		–		–		3	0
FC Twente	2009–10	Eredivisie	2	0	2	2	–		2 (Note: Appearances in UEFA Champions League)	0	–		6	2
FC Twente	Total		5	0	2	2	–		2	0	–		9	2
Roeselare (loan)	2009–10	Belgian Pro League	9	4	4	0	–		–		–		13	4
Hertha BSC	2010–11	2. Bundesliga	31	4	1	0	–		–		–		32	4
Hertha BSC	2011–12	Bundesliga	24	1	1	1	–		–		1 (Note: Appearance in Bundesliga relegation play-offs)	0	26	2
Hertha BSC	2012–13	2. Bundesliga	1	0	0	0	–		–		–		1	0
Hertha BSC	Total		56	5	2	1	–		–		1	0	59	6
Mainz 05	2012–13	Bundesliga	8	0	1	0	–		–		–		9	0
FSV Frankfurt	2013–14	2. Bundesliga	19	2	1	0	–		–		–		20	2
Western Sydney Wanderers	2014–15	A-League	23	3	0	0	–		4 (Note: Appearances in AFC Champions League)	1	1 (Note: Appearance in FIFA Club World Cup)	0	28	4
Beitar Jerusalem	2015–16	Israeli Premier League	30	14	1	0	1	0	–		–		32	14
Maccabi Haifa	2016–17	Israeli Premier League	21	4	1	0	3	1	2 (Note: Appearances in UEFA Europa League)	1	1 (Note: Appearance in Israel Super Cup)	1	26	6
Maccabi Haifa	2017–18	Israeli Premier League	32	10	4	3	4	2	–		–		40	15
Maccabi Haifa	2018–19	Israeli Premier League	35	9	2	0	6	4	–		–		43	13
Maccabi Haifa	2019–20	Israeli Premier League	36	22	3	0	2	1	3	1	–		43	24
Maccabi Haifa	2020–21	Israeli Premier League	28	19	3	0	3	1	4	4	–		38	24
Maccabi Haifa	Total		152	64	13	3	18	9	9	6	1	1	192	83
Hapoel Be'er Sheva	2021–22	Israeli Premier League	28	10	1	0	1	0	–		–		30	10
Maccabi Haifa	2022–23	Israeli Premier League	19	1	3	0	0	0	11	0	1	0	34	1
Western United	2023–24	A-League Men	11	1	0	0	–		–		–		11	1
Career total			402	120	28	6	20	9	26	7	9	3	485	145

=== International ===
As of match played 11 June 2021

Appearances and goals by national team and year
National team	Year	Apps	Goals
Australia	2009	1	0
Australia	2010	6	0
Australia	2012	3	1
Australia	2013	3	0
Australia	2017	3	0
Australia	2018	2	0
Australia	2021	2	0
Total		20	1

Scores and results list Australia's goal tally first, score column indicates score after each Rukavytsya goal.

List of international goals scored by Nikita Rukavytsya
No.	Date	Venue	Opponent	Score	Result	Competition
1	14 November 2012	Hwaseong Stadium, Hwaseong, South Korea	South Korea	1–1	1–2	Friendly

== Honours ==
Twente

- Eredivisie: 2009–10

Hertha BSC

- 2. Bundesliga: 2010–11

Maccabi Haifa

- Israeli Premier League: 2020–21, 2022–23

Hapoel Be'er Sheva

- Israeli State Cup: 2021–22

Individual

- Harry Kewell Medal: 2008–09
- PFA A-League Team of the Year: 2008–09
- Israeli Premier League top-goalscorer: 2019–20, 2020–21
