= Mark Lee (footballer, born 1979) =

English-Australian footballer

Personal information
- Date of birth: 31 May 1979 (age 47)
- Place of birth: Consett, England
- Position: Full back

Team information
- Current team: ECU Joondalup
- Number: 21

Youth career
- Middlesbrough
- Scarborough

Senior career*
Years	Team	Apps	(Gls)
- Hibernian
2003	Swan I.C.		
2004–2008	Western Knights		(3)
2005–2006	Bayswater City		(4)
2006–2007	ECU Joondalup		
2006–2007	Perth Glory	8	(0)
2007–2008	ECU Joondalup		
2008–2009	Perth Glory	2	(0)
2009–	ECU Joondalup		
- * Club domestic league appearances and goals

Mark Lee (born 31 May 1979 in Consett) is an English-Australian footballer.

== Club career ==
As a junior, he was on the books at Middlesbrough, but failed to make the grade. In 1996, he signed as an apprentice at Scarborough, before moving to Scottish club Hibernian. In 1999, he has a trial with Perth Glory in Australia, but was not taken on. He then went to Lynn University in the United States and completed a degree in Sports Management. He subsequently played for several teams in the Western Australia State League, including Western Knights and ECU Joondalup, while working as a youth development coach. In 2005, he was named the Western Australia State League player of the year. He also played for Blyth Spartans, Gateshead, Easington and Consett before heading back to Australia. He has been running his coaching businesses, Mark Lee Football Coaching & Pro Football Training since 2009

== Perth Glory ==
In 2006, he joined Perth Glory, where he was originally signed as a replacement for the injured Bobby Despotovski, though Perth Glory since decided to extend his contract. He made his A-League debut on 10 December 2006 against Central Coast Mariners. He was released by Perth Glory at the end of 2009 for a second time and now owns his coaching company Mark Lee Football Coaching as well as Pro Football Training.
