= Josip Magdić =

Croatian footballer

Personal information
- Full name: Josip Magdić
- Date of birth: 19 December 1985 (age 40)
- Place of birth: Nova Gradiška, Croatia
- Height: 1.85 m (6 ft 1 in)
- Position: Central midfielder

Youth career
- Floreat Athena

Senior career*
Years	Team	Apps	(Gls)
2002–2004	Floreat Athena		
2004–2005	NK Slavonija		
2006	Floreat Athena		
2006–2007	Perth Glory	4	(1)
2007–2008	Floreat Athena		
2008–2009	Perth Glory	0	(0)
2010–2012	Melbourne Knights	38	(4)
- * Club domestic league appearances and goals as of 15 July 2007

Josip Magdić (born 19 December 1985) is a Croatian footballer who also played professionally in Australia.

== Club career ==
Magdić began his career with Perth SC, before transferring to Floreat Athena. He later signed with Croatian second division side NK Slavonija Požega. He returned to Floreat Athena for the 2006 season and was playing so well that he was snapped up halfway through the season by Perth Glory. In the 2006/2007 A-League season Magdić played 5 times and scored 1 goal, but he did not remain on the Perth Glory roster for the 2007/2008 season as Ron Smith did not renew his contract. After a great season with Floreat Athena in 2007, in which he helped the club to their first Premiership in 10 years, he received a trial with A-League club Queensland Roar before signing on for Perth Glory for the second time but he never played a game due to injury.

Magdić signed for the Melbourne Knights competing in the Victorian Premier League for the 2010 season.

== A-League career statistics ==
(Correct as of 20 September 2008)

Club	Season	League			Finals			Asia			Total		
Club	Season	Apps	Goals	Assists	Apps	Goals	Assists	Apps	Goals	Assists	Apps	Goals	Assists
Perth Glory	2006–07	4	1	1	-	-	-	-	-	-	4	1	1
Perth Glory	2008–09	0	0	0	-	-	-	-	-	-	0	0	0
Total		4	1	1	-	-	-	-	-	-	4	1	1
