= Ryan Townsend =

English-born Australian soccer player

Personal information
- Date of birth: 2 September 1985 (age 41)
- Place of birth: Manchester, England
- Position: Central defender

Team information
- Current team: Mandurah City

Senior career*
Years	Team	Apps	(Gls)
2004	Burnley	1	(0)
2005	Wanneroo City		
2005–2007	Perth Glory	3	(0)
2007–2008	Persiba Balikpapan		
2008–2011	Mandurah City		

International career
2005	Australia U20	3	(0)
- * Club domestic league appearances and goals

Ryan Townsend (born 2 September 1985) is an Australian former soccer player.

== Biography ==
Townsend was born in Manchester, in the United Kingdom, but was raised in Perth, Western Australia. His father was a former professional footballer, George Townsend. After growing up in Australia he returned to the UK having earned a place in Burnley's youth development set-up. Townsend could have stayed at Burnley but they could not extend his contract due to ECU Joondalup (his club in Perth) demanding a large development fee. Townsend instead returned to Perth where he started to train with Perth Glory before playing two games in 2005 on a short-term contract. Townsend then joined Wanneroo City in the Football West State League, before he was offered a full-time contract with Perth Glory in place of Daniel Vasilevski for the A-League 2006-07 season. He was released four games before the end of the A-League season after a single appearance and then decided to play in Indonesia with Persiba Balikpapan until 2008.

== Australian career ==
He has played for the Australian U20 side, the "Young Socceroos", three times. A highlight for Townsend was scoring against Japan in the 2005 FIFA World Youth Championship.
