= Aleks Vrteski =

Macedonian footballer

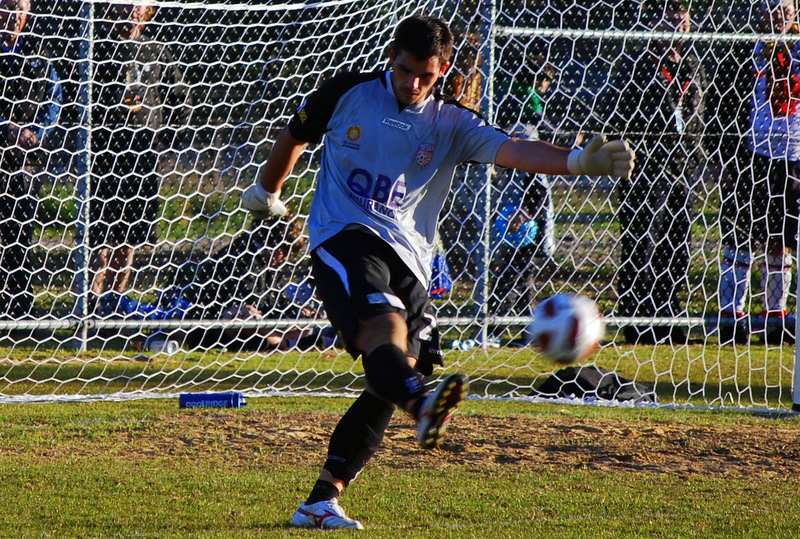

Personal information
- Full name: Aleksandar Vrteski
- Date of birth: 28 September 1988 (age 38)
- Place of birth: Karratha, Australia
- Height: 1.94 m (6 ft 4 1/2 in)
- Position: Goalkeeper

Youth career
- Future Glory
- AIS

Senior career*
Years	Team	Apps	(Gls)
2006–2007	Perth Glory	9	(0)
2007–2009	FK Pobeda	20	(0)
2009–2010	Perth Glory	6	(0)
2010–2011	Solo FC	17	(0)
2011–2012	Jakarta FC 1928	18	(0)
2012	→ Newcastle Jets (loan)	2	(0)
2013–2014	Stirling Lions	12	(0)
2015	Inglewood United	17	(0)
2016	Gwelup Croatia	2	(0)

International career^{‡}
2005	Australia U17	4	(0)
2007	Australia U20	3	(0)
2009	Macedonia U21	1	(0)

Managerial career
- 2017: Gwelup Croatia
- 2018–2021: Balga SC
- 2021–: Robina City
- * Club domestic league appearances and goals as of 16:47, 19 November 2010 (UTC) ‡ National team caps and goals as of 17:30, 19 November 2010 (UTC)

Aleksandar "Aleks" Vrteski (Macedonian: Александар Вртески; born 28 September 1988) is a former footballer who played as a goalkeeper for Stirling Lions. Born in Australia, he represented Australia internationally before switching to represent Macedonia.

== Club career ==
Having been involved with Perth Glory's former youth development scheme, Future Glory, in the past, Vrteski was invited by technical manager, Mich d'Avray, to train with the first team as part of the Pathway to Glory initiative midway through 2005. Vrteski was signed from the Australian Institute of Sport and was the youngest player in the A-League for the 2006-07 season.

In October 2006, Aleks became the club's first-choice goalkeeper for the 06/07 season for the first few rounds but was replaced by Jason Petkovic. Petkovic suffered a season- (and possibly career-) ending injury in Round Nine and Vrteski was a starter for a few more games until the club signed Tommi Tomich, who replaced Vrteski in the starting line-up. Vrteski made a move overseas to play for Macedonian club FK Pobeda in 2007 and returned to Australia to sign for Perth Glory for the second time in his career in 2009, where he played as a backup to Tando Velaphi.

Aleks Vrteski has signed with Solo FC in Liga Primer Indonesia. On 22 November 2012 it was announced that the player had been loaned to Newcastle Jets as an injury replacement.

== A-League career statistics ==
(Correct as of 8 March 2010)

Club	Season	League		Finals		Asia		Total	
Club	Season	Apps	CS	Apps	CS	Apps	CS	Apps	CS
Perth Glory	2006–07	9	1	-	-	-	-	9	1
Perth Glory	2007–08	0	0	-	-	-	-	0	0
Perth Glory	2009–10	3	0	-	-	-	-	3	0
Total		12	1	-	-	-	-	12	1

== International career ==
Vrteski has played for Australia at U-17 and U-20 levels. The 17-year-old made his debut for the Young Socceroos, keeping a clean sheet in a 4–0 win over Sri Lanka in Colombo to seal the U-20s' place in the Asian Youth Championships.

As a member of Macedonia U-21 team he played for the friendly match against Croatia U-21 on 11 February 2009.
