= Nick Ward (soccer, born 1985) =

Australian soccer player

Personal information
- Full name: Nicholas Andrew Ward
- Date of birth: 24 March 1985 (age 41)
- Place of birth: Perth, Western Australia
- Height: 1.83 m (6 ft 0 in)
- Position: Attacking midfielder

Youth career
- Olympic Kingsway
- 2000–2002: ECU Joondalup
- 2003: AIS

Senior career*
Years	Team	Apps	(Gls)
2003–2004	Perth Glory	2	(0)
2004	Stirling Lions	7	(2)
2005–2006	Perth Glory	21	(5)
2006–2007	Queens Park Rangers	20	(1)
2007	→ Brighton & Hove Albion (loan)	8	(1)
2007–2010	Melbourne Victory	46	(5)
2010–2011	Wellington Phoenix	24	(1)
2011	Iraklis	0	(0)
2011–2012	Wellington Phoenix	22	(2)
2012–2013	Perth Glory	23	(2)
2013–2014	Newcastle Jets	6	(0)
2015	Western Sydney Wanderers	1	(0)
2017–2018	Bentleigh Greens	0	(0)
2018–2019	NEROCA	2	(0)
2018–2019	Pascoe Vale	6	(0)

International career^{‡}
2004–2005	Australia U-20	16	(4)
2006–2008	Australia U-23	16	(2)
- * Club domestic league appearances and goals as of 30 September 2019 ‡ National team caps and goals as of 19 November 2010

Nick Ward (born 24 March 1985) is an Australian football (soccer) player, who plays as a midfielder for Pascoe Vale FC in the National Premier League.

== Club career ==
His efforts in the inaugural A-League season of 2005–06 resulted in him becoming the first player to win the A-League's Rising Star Award with Perth Glory, along with also winning the Perth Supporter's Player of the Year, and also the Smokefree WA Coach's Award.

Following the end of the first A-League season, Nick Ward had trials with Leicester City and Brentford however, much to the disappointment of Football Federation Australia, he joined Queens Park Rangers in the English Championship prior to the 2006–07 season.

On 31 January 2007, the last day of the transfer window, Ward joined Brighton on loan for the remainder of the 2006–07 season. On 17 February 2007, Ward scored his first goal for the Albion in their 2–1 home win over Nottingham Forest before returning to Queens Park Rangers.

On 4 December 2007, Ward's contract with Queens Park Rangers was terminated by mutual consent. He joined Melbourne Victory before further signing on as the Victory's youth marquee in a two-year deal. On 11 January 2008, Ward scored his first goal for the Melbourne Victory in their 3–0 home win over Wellington Phoenix.

On 1 September 2010, it was announced that Ward had signed with the Wellington Phoenix for the remainder of the 2010/11 A-League season. On 11 September 2010, against Sydney FC, he scored his only goal for the Phoenix, a wonderful shot into the top right hand corner from outside the 18-yard box. Following the season, Ward was released from the Phoenix. Months after joining Iraklis, Ward returned to the Wellington Phoenix after the Greek team was relegated to the amateur divisions. Ward said, "I am delighted Ricki wanted me back and everything has fallen into place.

Ward rejoined Perth Glory for the 2012/13 Hyundai A-League Season, scoring his first goal since returning in the club's 3–2 win over the Newcastle Jets on 3 November 2012. He scored his second goal for the club against the Western Sydney Wanderers in the 87th minute, which finished in a 1–1 draw.

Ward, along with teammates Evan Berger, Dean Heffernan and Lewis Italiano were released by the Glory at the end of the 2012–13 A-League season. Ward unsuccessfully played a trial game for the Western Sydney Wanderers during the 2013–14 pre-season.

Ward signed with Newcastle Jets as injury cover at the end of December 2013.

On 28 February 2015, Ward signed with Western Sydney Wanderers, making his debut in a 3–0 loss to Melbourne Victory, and unfortunately for Ward, suffering an Anterior Cruciate Ligament tear.

Ward returned to football in June 2017, signing with National Premier Leagues Victoria side Bentleigh Greens.

In 2018, he moved to Indian I-League side NEROCA, and appeared in two league matches.

== International career ==
Shooting for goal during the 2008–2009 A-league season.

After his season had concluded with Perth Glory, Ward was selected by Australia in an extended squad for its opening Asian Cup qualifier with Bahrain. Ward was named on the bench, but did not play on the field.

In December 2006 the then Socceroos manager Graham Arnold believed that Ward (lacking game time under the management of Queens Park Rangers at the time) should be playing continental European competitions (e.g. Belgium, Netherlands), where there was (in Arnold's opinion) better ball delivery and midfield play than in the English Championship. Those comments could be interpreted as a preliminary reason not to select Ward in forthcoming Socceroos friendlies at the time. Ward's absence from more recent squads could be attributed to his lack playing minutes at Melbourne Victory (due to injuries and club coach Ernie Merrick's preference for more experienced players in his positions) and the success of other similar young players in transitioning their career to European clubs (including Nick Carle, Dario Vidosic, Nikita Rukavytsya and Brett Holman).

His exclusion from the Olyroos squad for the 2008 Beijing Olympics was a major disappointment especially after being a regular squad member under coach Rob Baan in Australia's qualification path.

== Club career statistics ==
All-Time Club Performances
Club	Season	A-League		Finals Series		Asia		Total
Club	Season	App	Goals	App	Goals	App	Goals	App	Goals
Perth Glory (A-League)	2003–04	2	0					2	0
Perth Glory (A-League)	2005–06	21	5					21	5
Perth Glory (A-League)	2012–13	4	2					4	2
Perth Glory (A-League)	Club Total	27	7					27	7
Club	Season	Championship		FA Cup		League Cup		Total
Club	Season	App	Goals	App	Goals	App	Goals	App	Goals
Queens Park Rangers (Football League Championship)	2006–07	19	1	1	0	1	0	21	1
Queens Park Rangers (Football League Championship)	2007–08	1	0			1	0	2	0
Queens Park Rangers (Football League Championship)	Club Total	20	1	1	0	2	0	23	1
Club	Season	League One		FA Cup		League Cup		Total
Club	Season	App	Goals	App	Goals	App	Goals	App	Goals
Brighton & Hove Albion F.C. (Football League One) (on loan from Queens park Rangers)	2006–07	8	1					8	1
Brighton & Hove Albion F.C. (Football League One) (on loan from Queens park Rangers)	Club Total	8	1					8	1
Club	Season	A-League		Finals Series		Asia		Total
Club	Season	App	Goals	App	Goals	App	Goals	App	Goals
Melbourne Victory (A-League)	2007–08	5	1					5	1
Melbourne Victory (A-League)	2008–09	15	2	3	0	?	?	18	2
Melbourne Victory (A-League)	2009–10	19	2	3	0	?	?	22	2
Melbourne Victory (A-League)	2010–11	1	0					1	0
Melbourne Victory (A-League)	Club Total	40	5	6	0			46	5
Club	Season	A-League		Finals Series		Asia		Total
Club	Season	App	Goals	App	Goals	App	Goals	App	Goals
Wellington Phoenix (A-League)	2010–11	23	1	1	0			24	1
Wellington Phoenix (A-League)	2011–12	18	2	0	0			18	2
Wellington Phoenix (A-League)	Club Total	41	3	1	0			42	3
Career totals
Last updated 8 March 2012

== Honours ==
Melbourne Victory

- A-League Championship: 2008–09
- A-League Premiership: 2008–09

Perth Glory

- NSL Championship: 2003–04

Individual

- A-League Young Player of the Year: 2005–06
- Perth Glory Member's Player of the Year: 2005–06

Awards
Preceded by Alex Brosque	Hyundai A-League; Young Player of the Year Award; 2005–06	Succeeded by Adrian Leijer
