= Paul Pezos =

Australian soccer player

Personal information
- Full name: Paul Pezos Perogies
- Date of birth: 11 February 1979 (age 47)
- Place of birth: Adelaide, South Australia, Australia
- Height: 1.85 m (6 ft 1 in)
- Position: Central midfielder

Senior career*
Years	Team	Apps	(Gls)
1995–1998	West Adelaide	35	(4)
1996–1999	West Adelaide Sharks	57	(0)
1999	Western Strikers	16	(0)
2000	Cumberland United	6	(0)
2000	MetroStars	10	(0)
2001–2002	Birkalla / Adelaide Galaxy	44	(3)
2003–2004	Adelaide Blue Eagles	45	(3)
2005–2006	Adelaide City	43	(1)
2006–2007	Perth Glory	3	(0)
2007–2010	Adelaide City	59	(2)
2010	Adelaide Olympic	8	(2)
2011–2012	Adelaide City	28	(0)
2012–2014	West Adelaide	54	(2)
Total		408	(17)

Managerial career
- 2013–2015: Adelaide United W-League (Asst manager)
- 2014–2016: West Adelaide
- 2017–2020: Adelaide United Youth
- 2021–2024: Adelaide City
- 2024–: Melbourne City (Asst manager)
- * Club domestic league appearances and goals as of 9 December 2024

Paul Pezos (born 11 February 1979) is an Australian footballer. He has played in the NSL with West Adelaide SC from 1996 until 1999 and then went to play in the South Australian Super League with Adelaide City. Paul was signed by A-League outfit Perth Glory on a short-term contract on the advice of former Perth Glory club legend Damian Mori because of his stand out performances for Adelaide City.
