= Adrian Webster (footballer, born 1980) =

New Zealand footballer

Personal information
- Full name: Adrian Webster
- Date of birth: 10 October 1980 (age 46)
- Place of birth: Hastings, New Zealand
- Height: 5 ft 10 in (1.78 m)
- Position: Winger

Team information
- Current team: Cockburn City

Youth career
- 1996: Macarthur Rams
- 1997–1998: Blacktown City
- 1998: Charlton Athletic

Senior career*
Years	Team	Apps	(Gls)
1998–1999	Charlton Athletic	0	(0)
1999–2000	Faversham Town	0	(0)
2000	Colchester United	0	(0)
2001–2002	Ashford Town (Kent)	4	(0)
2002	Welling United	5	(0)
2002	Margate	1	(0)
2002–2003	Maidstone United	6	(0)
2003–2004	St George Saints	24	(2)
2004–2006	Darlington	35	(1)
2006–2007	Perth Glory	20	(0)
2007	Blacktown City Demons	8	(2)
2007	Workington	3	(0)
2007–2008	Blyth Spartans	10	(0)
2008–2010	Myllykosken Pallo -47	10	(0)
2010–2012	Kuopion Palloseura	8	(0)
2012–2013	Blyth Spartans	14	(3)
2013–	Cockburn City	30	(4)

International career^{‡}
2005–2006	New Zealand	5	(0)
- * Club domestic league appearances and goals as of 26 January 2009 ‡ National team caps and goals as of 20 August 2008

Adrian Webster (born 10 October 1980 in Hastings, New Zealand) is a New Zealand footballer who plays for Cockburn City. He has represented New Zealand at full international level.

== Biography ==
Webster's family moved to Australia when he was a toddler and he was brought up there. Injuries have been a source of problems for Webster. In 1995, while on trial at Newcastle United, he broke his ankle and was forced to return to Australia, where he finished school and played junior football for MacArthur Rams and Blacktown City.

He returned to England in 1996 and joined Charlton Athletic as a trainee. He turned professional in August 1998, but failed to make the first team squad and was released. He was briefly with Faversham Town before joining Colchester United in May 1999. However, with Colchester in the midst of a financial crisis, he was released before he had made his debut. He then played for Ashford Town (Kent) and Welling United.

He joined Torquay United on trial in February 2002, but was not offered a contract. He joined Margate in August 2002, but played just once, as a late substitute for John Keister as Margate drew 1–1 at home to Morecambe in the Conference on 17 August. He joined Maidstone United later the same month.

He returned to Australia in 2003 to play for St George Saints where in the last match of the season he snapped a medial ligaments in his knee.

However, David Hodgson, Darlington's manager, saw potential in Webster and decided to give him an opportunity to regain fitness at his club which eventually led to Webster signing for Darlington in October 2004. He made his league debut on 6 November, as a late substitute for Craig Hignett who had scored both goals as Darlington won 2–1 away to Rushden & Diamonds.

Webster was released by Darlington in May 2006 and returned to Australia. He was signed by A-League club Perth Glory where he played every game in a failed campaign to make the final series. After a game against Adelaide United on 28 December 2006, Webster came to blows with teammate and Glory captain Jamie Harnwell, while the players were still on the pitch. It went down in history as an A-League classic moment.

After leaving Perth Glory, he had a brief spell with Blacktown City Demons before returning to England to work as a personal trainer in Teesside, close to his pregnant girlfriend's home. He had trials with Brighton & Hove Albion and Burton Albion (scoring for the Brewers against Nottingham Forest in the Bass Charity Vase Final) in England and also with a side in Bratislava before joining Workington.

He moved to Conference North rivals Blyth Spartans at the start of October 2007, but left in April 2008 to join Finnish side Myllykosken Pallo -47. He played 10 games with MyPa before joining another Finnish club, Kuopion Palloseura. Webster played 8 games for KuPS and helped the team to keep their place in Veikkausliiga. In January 2009 Webster re-joined Blyth Spartans. In January 2010 he signed for Australian side Cockburn City.

== International career ==
Webster made his international debut for New Zealand in a 0–1 loss to Australia in London on 9 June 2005. In 2006, he returned to New Zealand for the first time since his childhood, for the two match series against Malaysia. In 2006, he overcome ankle injury to gain selection for the All Whites in their off season tour which included footballing giants Brazil. He has made a total of five official international appearances for New Zealand.
