= David Tarka =

Australian soccer player

Personal information
- Full name: David Neil Tarka
- Date of birth: 11 February 1983 (age 43)
- Place of birth: Perth, Western Australia
- Height: 1.90 m (6 ft 3 in)
- Position: Centre-back

Youth career
- Spearwood Dalmatinac
- Fremantle United
- 2000–2001: AIS

Senior career*
Years	Team	Apps	(Gls)
2001–2003	Perth Glory	45	(1)
2003–2005	Nottingham Forest	0	(0)
2005–2009	Perth Glory	33	(1)
2010–2016	Cockburn City		

International career
2003	Australia U20		
2004	Australia U23		
2004	Australia	2	(0)
Medal record
Representing Australia
Men's Association football
OFC Nations Cup
Winner	2004 Australia
OFC U-20 Championship
Winner	2002 Fiji/Vanuatu
- * Club domestic league appearances and goals

David Tarka (born 11 February 1983) is an Australian former professional soccer player who played as a centre-back. He made two appearances for the Australia national team.

== Club career ==
Tarka was born in Perth, Western Australia. He was an Australian youth international and was an Australian schoolboy international in 1999. Tarka helped the Australia under 20 team qualify for the 2003 World Youth Championships in the UAE and played in the Australia under 23 team's 2004 Olympic Games Qualifiers. Tarka turned down a chance for a trial at West Ham United in April 2003, instead staying in Australia to help Perth Glory win the NSL championship. In the middle of 2003 Tarka moved to Nottingham Forest in England for a fee of £100,000.

== International career ==
Tarka earned two full international caps against Vanuatu and Solomon Islands in 2004.

== Career statistics ==
(Correct as of 2 February 2009)

Club	Season	League			Finals			Asia			Total		
Club	Season	Apps	Goals	Assists	Apps	Goals	Assists	Apps	Goals	Assists	Apps	Goals	Assists
Perth Glory	2005–06	3	0	0	-	-	-	-	-	-	3	0	0
Perth Glory	2006–07	20	1	0	-	-	-	-	-	-	20	1	0
Perth Glory	2007–08	1	0	0	-	-	-	-	-	-	1	0	0
Perth Glory	2008–09	9	0	0	-	-	-	-	-	-	9	0	0
Total		33	1	0	-	-	-	-	-	-	33	1	0

== Honours ==
Perth Glory

- NSL Championship: 2002-2003

Australia

- OFC Nations Cup: 2004

Australia U-20

- OFC U-19 Men's Championship: 2002

Personal honours:

- Perth Glory Most Glorious Player Award: 2006-2007
- Perth Glory Player's Player of the Year: 2006-2007
- Perth Glory Young Player of the Year: 2006-2007
