= Steve McMahon (footballer, born 1984) =

English footballer

Personal information
- Full name: Stephen Joseph McMahon
- Date of birth: 31 July 1984 (age 42)
- Place of birth: Southport, Merseyside, England
- Position: Defender

Senior career*
Years	Team	Apps	(Gls)
2001–2004	Blackpool	18	(0)
2004	→ Kidderminster Harriers (loan)	5	(0)
2005–2006	Perth Glory	12	(0)
Total		35	(0)
- * Club domestic league appearances and goals

Stephen Joseph McMahon (born 31 July 1984) is an English former footballer who played as a defender.

== Career ==
McMahon started his career at Blackpool making his debut in 2002 whilst his father Steve McMahon was manager. In 2004 Blackpool won the Football League Trophy and McMahon played as a substitute in the final. In September 2004, he joined Kidderminster Harriers on loan where he made six appearances in all competitions before returning to Blackpool. In February 2005, McMahon joined Perth Glory where his father had recently been appointed as manager. His father had to defend the signing after claims of nepotism in the media. He made 12 appearances for the club.

== Personal life ==
McMahon is the son of former England international footballer Steve McMahon who he played under at Blackpool and Perth Glory.

== Honours ==
Blackpool

- Football League Trophy: 2003–04
