= Tommi Tomich =

Australian soccer player

Personal information
- Full name: Tomislav Tomich
- Date of birth: 14 February 1980 (age 46)
- Place of birth: Perth, Western Australia
- Position: Goalkeeper

Senior career*
Years	Team	Apps	(Gls)
- Cockburn City
- Western Knights
2000–2001	Perth Glory	0	(0)
2001	Bassendean Caledonians		
2002–2003	Western Knights		
2003–2004	Melbourne Knights FC	10	(0)
2004–2006	Western Knights		
2006–2008	Perth Glory	18	(0)
2008	ECU Joondalup		
2008–2009	South Melbourne FC	28	(0)
2008	→ Melbourne Victory FC (loan)	0	(0)
2008	→ Adelaide United (loan)	0	(0)
2010–2011	Altona Magic		
2012–2015	Sydenham Park		
2016	Sporting Whittlesea	6	(0)
2017	Yarraville FC	20	(0)
- * Club domestic league appearances and goals as of 5 October 2017

Tomislav "Tommi" Tomich (born 14 February 1980) is an Australian goalkeeper who plays for Sydenham Park.

== Biography ==
Tomich has previously played with Bassendean Caledonians, Cockburn City, Melbourne Knights FC, Western Knights and a stint with Perth Glory in the 2000. In November 2006 Tomich joined Perth Glory as a replacement for injured keeper Jason Petkovic. His consistent performances had earned him a one-year deal until the end of the 2007–08 season as first-choice goalkeeper until Jason Petkovic recovered.

He was not offered another contract at Perth Glory and instead signed for local Perth club ECU Joondalup before moving to South Melbourne in 2008. In the same year he was loaned to Melbourne Victory FC in the A-League while Michael Theoklitos is injured and later to Adelaide United again for injury cover.
