= Ante Kovacevic =

Australian soccer player

Personal information
- Full name: Ante Kovacevic
- Date of birth: 13 June 1974 (age 52)
- Place of birth: Melbourne, Australia
- Height: 1.86 m (6 ft 1 in)
- Position: Central defender

Youth career
- St Albans Saints

Senior career*
Years	Team	Apps	(Gls)
1992–1994	St Albans Saints	41	(3)
1994–2000	Melbourne Knights	134	(14)
1998	Green Gully Cavaliers	22	(4)
2000–2003	Adelaide City Force	80	(7)
2001	→ Adelaide Raiders (loan)	6	(0)
2003–2004	South Melbourne	26	(2)
2004–2005	Selangor FA	32	(0)
2005–2007	Perth Glory	32	(0)
2007–2011	Floreat Athena	?	(?)
2012	Canning City	?	(3)

Managerial career
- 2011: Floreat Athena
- * Club domestic league appearances and goals as of 19 September 2015

Ante Kovacevic (born 13 June 1974 in Melbourne, Victoria, Australia is an Australian retired professional football (soccer) player who was the Director of Football at Adelaide United FC.

== Biography ==
Ante Kovacevic started off his senior career at St Albans Dinamo in 1992, the club at which he played as a junior for some time. He spent two years in the senior team at Dinamo, making 41 appearances before moving to Dinamo's sister club Melbourne Knights in 1994. At the Knights, Ante won back-to-back NSL titles in 1995 and 1996, the NSL cup in 1995 and the Dockerty Cup in 1996 over the six years that he spent there. Kovacevic had a short spell at Green Gully Cavaliers in 1998.

Ante made his first interstate move in 2000, when he moved to the NSL club Adelaide City FC. He spent three years there and had a short spell at Croatian-backed club Adelaide Raiders in the meantime, making six appearances for the club in 2001.

Kovacevic then returned to Melbourne in 2003 to play for South Melbourne FC. The next year, Ante made his first overseas move as he left for Selangor FA, a side in the Malaysia Super League. He spent just one year with the Malaysians before returning to play football in Australia.

In 2005, he signed a two-year contract with A-League side Perth Glory FC.

After retiring he has worked as a general manager at several A-League Men clubs including Adelaide United, Western United and Brisbane Roar.
