= Jamie Coyne =

Australian soccer player

Personal information
- Full name: Michael James Coyne
- Date of birth: 2 January 1981 (age 45)
- Place of birth: Sydney, Australia
- Height: 1.87 m (6 ft 1 1/2 in)
- Positions: Center back; left back

Youth career
- Perth SC

Senior career*
Years	Team	Apps	(Gls)
1998–1999	West Ham United	0	(0)
2000–2002	Perth SC	47	(0)
2002–2004	Perth Glory	33	(0)
2004–2005	ADO Den Haag	7	(0)
2005–2011	Perth Glory	119	(4)
2011–2012	Sydney	15	(1)
2012–2013	Sriwijaya	18	(2)
2013	Melbourne Heart	12	(0)
2014–2016	Bayswater City	57	(2)
Total		308	(9)
- * Club domestic league appearances and goals

Jamie Coyne (born 2 January 1982) is an Australian former soccer player. He is the younger brother of Chris Coyne and son of former NSL player John Coyne.

== Club career ==
=== Early career ===
Jamie was signed by West Ham United as his first professional football contract. From there, Jamie returned to Australia to play for Perth SC, where he was voted the fairest and best player for the league. Jamie was then signed by Perth Glory as part of their national soccer league team where he played for two seasons while they won the league championship and were also grand final winners. After standing out for Perth Glory he signed a 3-year contract with ADO Den Haag in the Dutch Eredivisie.

=== Perth Glory ===
Jamie decided to return to Perth Glory for the second time in his career for the start of the new Hyundai A League competition, where he would remain for the next six years of his career. During this time he was the team captain and was also selected for the Australian national team training camps.

Jamie was a part of the Perth Glory team that made the finals for the first time in the clubs A-League history, during the 2009/10 season. However, the team bowed out to the Wellington Phoenix on penalties. He has played over 150 games for the club.

=== Sydney FC ===
After several seasons in Perth, Coyne was offered a one-year contract with Sydney FC. Known for his physical presence, pace and commitment he was seen as an important signing in renewing their backline. His first goal came in his third match for the club against Adelaide United F.C. Jamie asked for a release from his contract so that he could sign for Sriwajaya FC in the Indonesian Super League for the second half of the season.

=== Sriwijaya ===
He made an immediate impact with his new club when they didn't concede a goal in his first 6 games, the team went on to win the league title with 4 games remaining in the season.

=== Melbourne Heart ===
Coyne returned to Australia and on 6 February 2013 joined A-League side Melbourne Heart until the end of the season.

== Honours ==
=== Club honours ===
Perth SC

- Football West State League Premier Division (1): 2002

Perth Glory

- National Soccer League (2): 2002–03, 2003–04

Sriwijaya

- Indonesia Super League (1): 2011–12

Bayswater City SC

- National Premier Leagues Western Australia (1): 2014

== Club career statistics ==
Club	Season	League			Finals			Asia			Total		
Club	Season	Apps	Goals	Assists	Apps	Goals	Assists	Apps	Goals	Assists	Apps	Goals	Assists
Perth Glory	2005–06	17	1	4	-	-	-	-	-	-	17	1	4
Perth Glory	2006–07	20	1	1	-	-	-	-	-	-	20	1	1
Perth Glory	2007–08	19	1	0	-	-	-	-	-	-	19	1	0
Perth Glory	2008–09	17	0	2	-	-	-	-	-	-	17	0	2
Perth Glory	2009–10	22	0	4	1	0	0	-	-	-	23	0	4
Perth Glory	2010–11	23	1	0	-	-	-	-	-	-	23	1	0
Total		118	4	11	1	0	0	-	-	-	119	4	11
Sydney	2011–12	15	1	0	-	-	-	-	-	-	15	1	0
Total		15	1	0	-	-	-	-	-	-	15	1	0
Sriwijaya	2011–12	14	0	0	-	-	-	-	-	-	14	0	0
Total		14	0	0	-	-	-	-	-	-	14	0	0
