= Simon Colosimo =

Australian soccer player (born 1979)

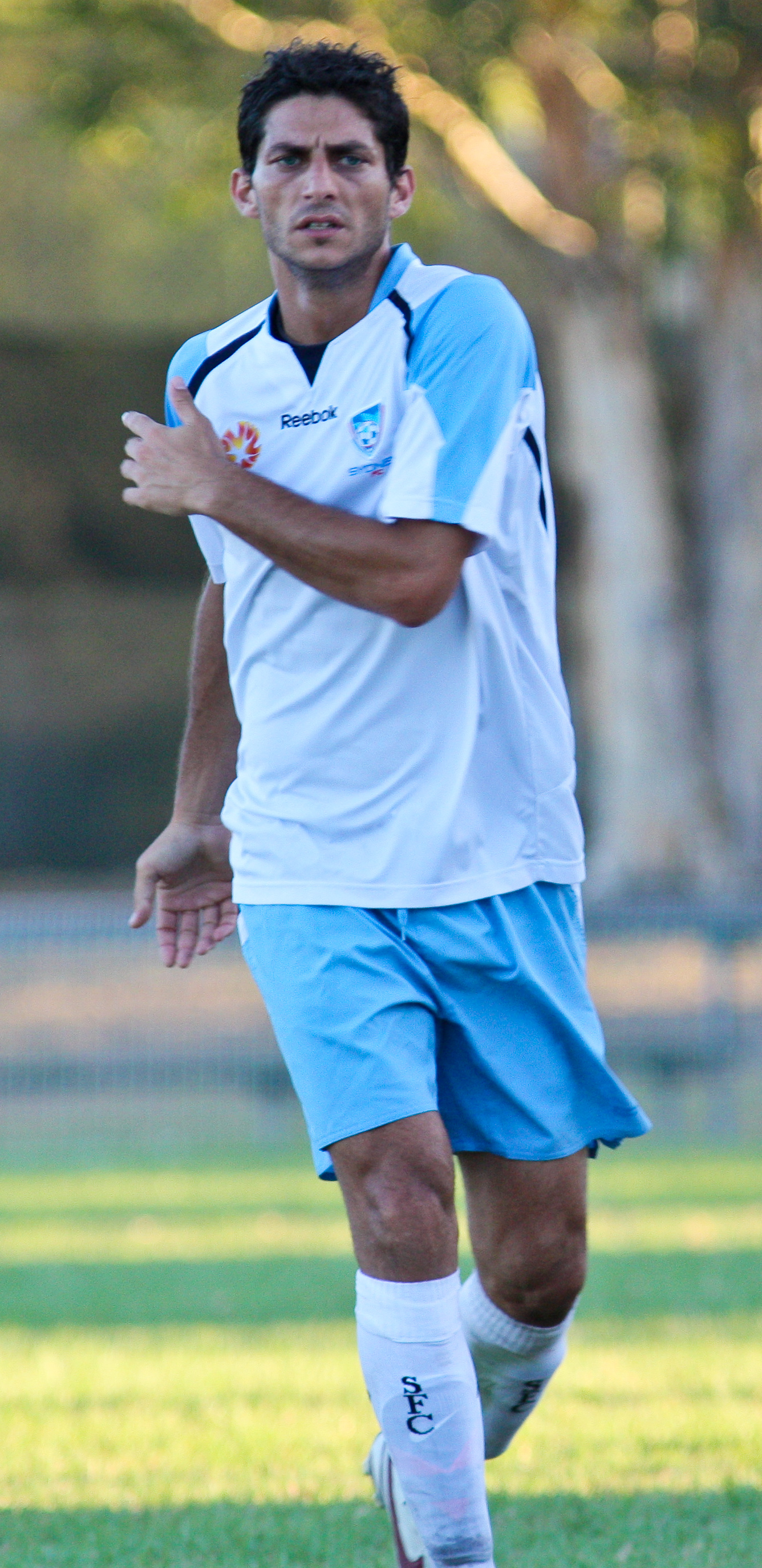

Personal information
- Date of birth: 8 January 1979 (age 47)
- Place of birth: Melbourne, Australia
- Height: 6 ft 0 in (1.83 m)
- Position: Centre-back

Youth career
- 1996–1997: AIS

Senior career*
Years	Team	Apps	(Gls)
1997–2000	Carlton SC	50	(10)
2000–2001	South Melbourne	18	(2)
2001–2002	Manchester City	6	(0)
2002	Royal Antwerp	0	(0)
2002–2003	Perth Glory	14	(0)
2003–2004	Parramatta Power	23	(1)
2004	Pahang FA	20	(6)
2005–2008	Perth Glory	50	(2)
2007	→ Sivasspor (loan)	14	(1)
2008–2010	Sydney FC	34	(0)
2010–2013	Melbourne Heart	63	(1)
2013–2014	Dempo	19	(0)
2014	Goulburn Valley Suns	11	(1)
2015	Werribee City	18	(1)
2016–2017	Dandenong Thunder	48	(10)
2018	Whittlesea Ranges	14	(2)
2018	Bulleen Lions	13	(0)
Total		415	(37)

International career
1996–1999	Australia U20	16	(5)
1997–2000	Australia U23	14	(0)
1998–2010	Australia	26	(3)
Medal record
Representing Australia
Men's Association football
OFC Nations Cup
Winner	2000 Tahiti
Winner	2004 Australia
Runner-up	1998 Australia
OFC U-20 Championship
Winner	1997 Tahiti
Winner	1998 Samoa
- * Club domestic league appearances and goals

Simon Colosimo (born 8 January 1979) is an Australian former professional soccer player who played as a centre-back and defensive midfielder.

He spent two years playing in Europe with spells in the Premier League with Manchester City and in the Belgian First Division for Royal Antwerp. Aside a spells with Pahang FA in 2004 and Sivasspor in 2007, the rest of his career was spent in his native Australia notably in the A-League with South Melbourne, Perth Glory, Parramatta Power and Sydney FC. He also played for Carlton SC, Melbourne Heart, Dempo, Goulburn Valley Suns, Werribee City, Dandenong Thunder, Whittlesea Ranges, Bulleen Lions. He was capped 26 times by Australia, scoring three goals.

== Club career ==
=== NSL years ===
Colosimo completed the Australian Institute of Sport football program in 1997 and signed with new National Soccer League club Carlton for their inaugural year. Interest had been shown from Bayern Munich and Panathinaikos to sign Colosimo, but a knee injury sustained in a horror tackle by Andy Cole while on Socceroos duty kept him out of the game for most of the 1999/00 season, but made his return on 14 March 2000 to score against South Melbourne, who would eventually acquire the midfielder after the demise of the Carlton club.

After a year at Souths, he sought a move to Europe and joined English side Manchester City for a season followed by a move to Belgium with Royal Antwerp. Unable to settle, he returned to Australia in 2002 to join Perth Glory in the NSL for a season, then moved to Parramatta Power until the demise of the league in 2004.

Along with a number of Australian players he made a move into Asia in the newly restructured Malaysia Super League at Pahang FA, helping them win the 2004 championship.

=== A-League career ===
He was enticed back to Australia with the relaunch of the A-League returning to Perth Glory signing a three-year deal, Colosimo received MVP for Perth Glory for the 2006–07 season.

Colosimo joined Turkish club Sivasspor on a four-month loan during the A-League off-season, and returned to Perth Glory for the start of the 2007–08 A-League season, and was handed the Perth Glory captaincy.

With his contract at Glory at an end, Colosimo was linked with a move to Sydney FC in 2008, receiving a hostile reception from Perth supporters who let him know he was no longer welcome and was dropped from the starting side for some final matches. Unable to reach a contract agreement, Perth released him from the club on 22 January 2008.

It was announced by Sydney FC that Colosimo had signed a two-year deal, and he joined the club from the start of the 2008–09 season. Colosimo became a standout performer as a centreback, with consistent performances impressing through the new 2009–10 season. On 31 March 2010, the defender switched clubs to Melbourne Heart, along with his teammates Clint Bolton and John Aloisi. He became the captain of the new club and scored one goal in their debut season, an important equaliser against Adelaide in the final minutes of the game, which Heart triumphed 2–1 in stoppage time.

As a result of the Heart finishing second-to-last on the A-League ladder, their worst finish in an A-League season, Colosimo, along with teammates Clint Bolton, Matt Thompson and Fred, were released by the Heart at the conclusion of the 2012–13 A-League season.

== International career ==
Colosimo first entered the Australian national selection framework at Under-20 level in 1997 while at the AIS. This led quickly to a national team debut in 1998 against Fiji at just 19 years of age. He remained in the national focus, selected as part of the squad at the 1999 FIFA World Youth Championship.

Later that year he was called up by then Socceroo manager Raul Blanco to make an appearance in the Socceroo's friendly against Manchester United on 18 July at the MCG. What started as a spirited game finished in horror for Simon, as Andy Cole lunged into a tackle with his leg raised and studs showing, felling the Australian midfielder in full-flight. Simon was stretchered off in pain by stewards, and was diagnosed with having sustained tears to his anterior cruciate and medial ligaments, needing a complete knee reconstruction. He underwent surgery soon after, which included his anterior cruciate being replaced with a piece of his hamstring tendon. A rehabilitation process began, in which Simon would not kick a ball for six months. There was talk at the time of impending legal action against Cole by Carlton's General Manager Lou Sticca, though no formal proceedings were ever entered into.

Following his recovery, he was selected for the 2000 Summer Olympics in Sydney, and was part of the national team squad for the 2005 FIFA Confederations Cup. Colosimo was selected in matches leading up to the 2007 AFC Asian Cup, but was not included in the squad for the final tournament although he was named as a standby reserve.

== Personal life ==
Colosimo is of Italian descent, and has a wife named Bianca, with whom he has two children. Simon attended St Monica’s College in Epping up until year 10 as he then moved to the AIS in Canberra for a scholarship His younger brother Anthony Colosimo played in the youth of Melbourne Knights FC and with Bulleen Lions.

== Career statistics ==
Appearances and goals by national team and year
National team	Year	Apps	Goals
Australia	1998	4	0
Australia	1999	0	0
Australia	2000	5	0
Australia	2001	4	2
Australia	2002	0	0
Australia	2003	0	0
Australia	2004	7	0
Australia	2005	3	1
Australia	2006	0	0
Australia	2007	1	0
Australia	2008	0	0
Australia	2009	0	0
Australia	2010	2	0
Total		26	3

#	Date	Venue	Opponent	Score	Result	Competition
1	11 April 2001	Coffs Harbour International Stadium, Coffs Harbour, Australia	American Samoa	18–0	31–0	2002 FIFA World Cup qualification
2	11 April 2001	Coffs Harbour International Stadium, Coffs Harbour, Australia	American Samoa	27–0	31–0	2002 FIFA World Cup qualification
3	9 June 2005	Craven Cottage, London, England	New Zealand	1–0	1–0	Friendly

== Honours ==
=== Player ===
Perth Glory

- NSL Championship: 2002–03

Pahang FA

- Malaysia Super League: 2004

Sydney FC

- A-League Premiership: 2009–10
- A-League Championship: 2009–10

Australia

- OFC Nations Cup: 2000, 2004; runner-up 1998

Australia U-20

- OFC U-19 Men's Championship: 1997, 1998

=== Individual ===
- Joe Marston Medal: 2003, 2010
- Perth Glory Most Glorious Player Award: 2006–07
- PFA A-League Team of the Season: 2009–10
