= Western Knights SC =

Football club in Perth, Western Australia

Western Knights
- Full name: Western Knights Soccer Club
- Nicknames: Croatia, Knights
- Founded: 1968
- Ground: Nash Field, Mosman Park
- President: Dean Zlendic
- Manager: Diego Marín Dupre
- League: NPL Western Australia
- 2026: 7th of 12
- Website: www.westernknights.com.au
Home colours	Away colours

Western Knights Soccer Club is an Australian soccer club currently playing in the National Premier Leagues Western Australia in Perth, Western Australia. Its home ground is Nash Field, in the Town of Mosman Park. Since 2018, the club expanded its junior program to include Len Packham Reserve in the City of Cockburn as well as Nash Field.

== History ==
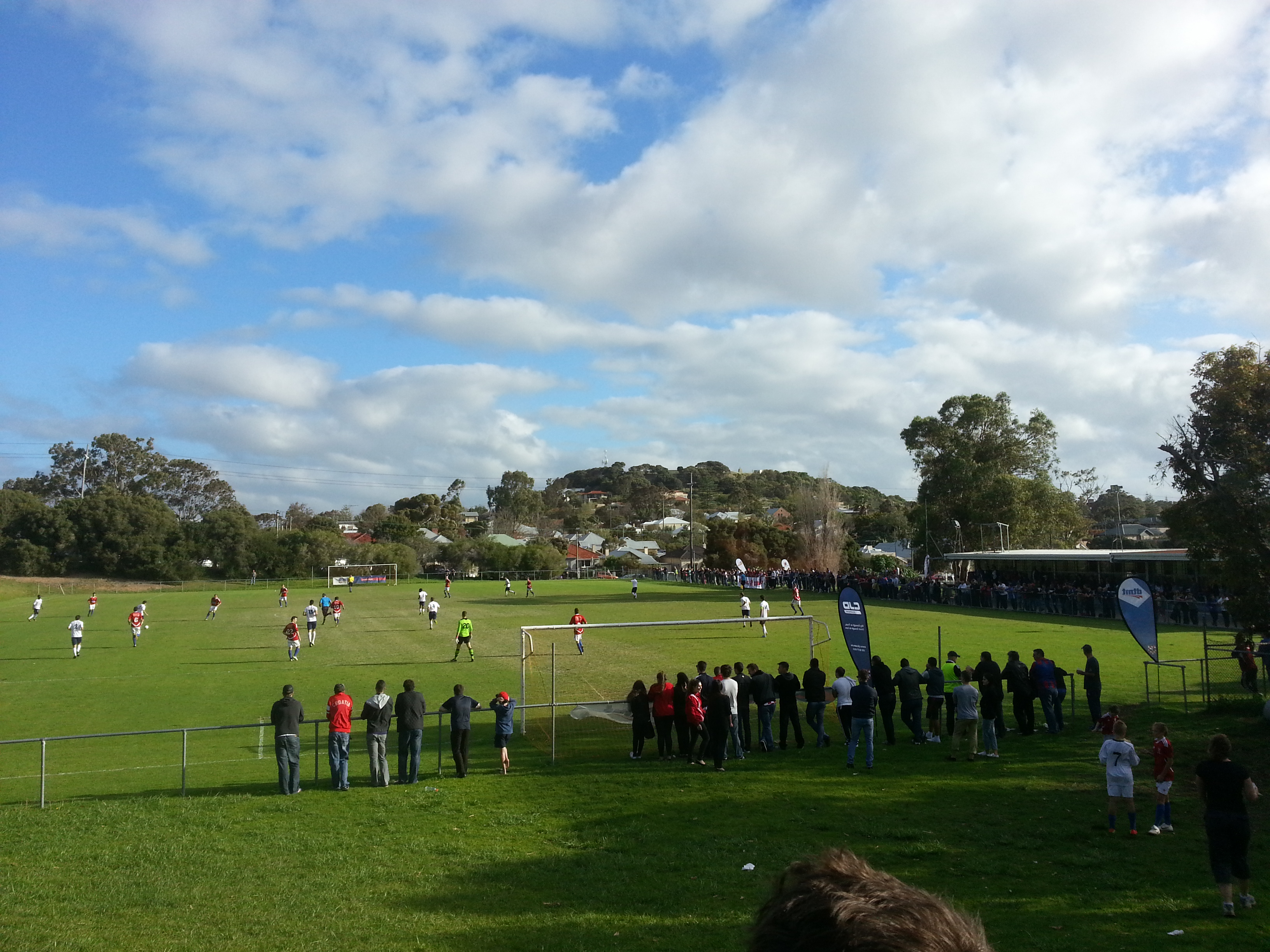
Nash Field

Western Knights was established by Croatian immigrants in the state of Western Australia under the name of Metropolitan in 1968, joining the semi-professional Second Division (third tier) the following year as Croatia. In 1970, under their new name of North Perth Croatia, they were promoted from the Second Division to the First Division. Throughout the years following, Croatia went up and down from First Division to the Premier Division.

With the moving from division to division also came the moving from different home grounds over the years. Wellington Square in East Perth, Velodrome in Mount Hawthorn and Perry Lakes Stadium were all homes to North Perth Croatia over those years.

In 1994, the club was forced by the then sport governing bodies to remove all ethnic references from their name, so the club changed their name from North Perth Croatia to Western Knights and in 1995, the club returned to the state's premier league until the 2013 season.

So far, 1998 proved to be the most successful year in the club's history. That year, the Knights take home the Premier League Minor Premiership, the Championship Final Series Grand Final for the first time in their history and the West Ham Cup.

The club claimed back to back minor premierships in 2009 and 2010 after finishing the home and away seasons on top of the league table.

The Western Knights has three Men's Senior Team which compete in the Football West State League Division 1. It also has Junior Boys and Girls teams from under 6 – 18. Through a joint arrangement with Perth AFC, the club encourages Senior Women, Men's Amateur and Social, and Futsal players to play for Perth AFC.

The Knights were a founding club in the Football West Equal Footingball competition (for those with competitive disadvantages), with both a Junior and Senior male team in competition.

In 2017, the Western Knights became the first Western Australian club outside of the National Premier Leagues Western Australia to reach the Round of 32 of the 2017 FFA Cup. The Western Knights were also the first team since 1991 to win the State Cup from outside of the Premier Division, when they defeated Sorrento. It followed this success by also winning the Football West State League Division 1 league title, the first time the club has completed the league and State Cup double.

In 2023, the Western Knights finished as Champions of Football West State League Division 1 and were promoted to the NPL WA for the first time.

== Notable former players ==
- Robbie Dunn. Played in the National Soccer League with West Adelaide, Preston Makedonia and Melbourne Croatia and has 25 international caps for the Australia national soccer team.
- Australia women's national soccer team player Sam Kerr began her career at Western Knights.
- Other players from the Western Knights who have continued their careers in the National Soccer League or A-League are Tommi Tomich, Craig Deans, Andrija Jukic, Anthony Skorich and David Micevski.

== Honours ==
- Western Australian Premier League Champions: 1998, 2004
- Western Australian Premier League Runner-Up: 1988, 2000, 2009, 2010
- Western Australian Premier League Minor Premiers: 1998, 2004, 2009, 2010
- Football West State Cup Winners: 2000, 2008, 2017
- D’Orsogna Cup Runner-Up: 1992
- Night Series Winners: 2003
- Night Series Runner-Up: 1996, 2002, 2004, 2010
- Charity Shield Winners: 2009
- West Ham Cup Winners: 1998
- Western Australian First Division (Second Division) Champions: 1971, 1975, 1995, 2017, 2023
- Western Australian First Division (Second Division) Runners up : 1973, 1974, 1979, 1980, 1981, 1987, 2019
- Western Australian First Division Night Series Winners: 2015, 2020
- Western Australian Third Division Champions: 1969
- Australian-Croatian Tournament Champions: 1980
- Western Australian First Division (Second Division) Reserves Champions: 1979, 1980, 1981, 1986
- Western Australian Cup Reserves Winners: 1976, 1999, 2004, 2008
- Western Australian Premier League Under 18 Champions: 2007
- Western Australian Cup Under 18 Winners: 2007
- Western Australian Premier League Under 16 Champions: 2005

== See also ==
- List of Croatian football clubs in Australia
- Australian-Croatian Soccer Tournament
