= David Micevski =

Australian soccer player

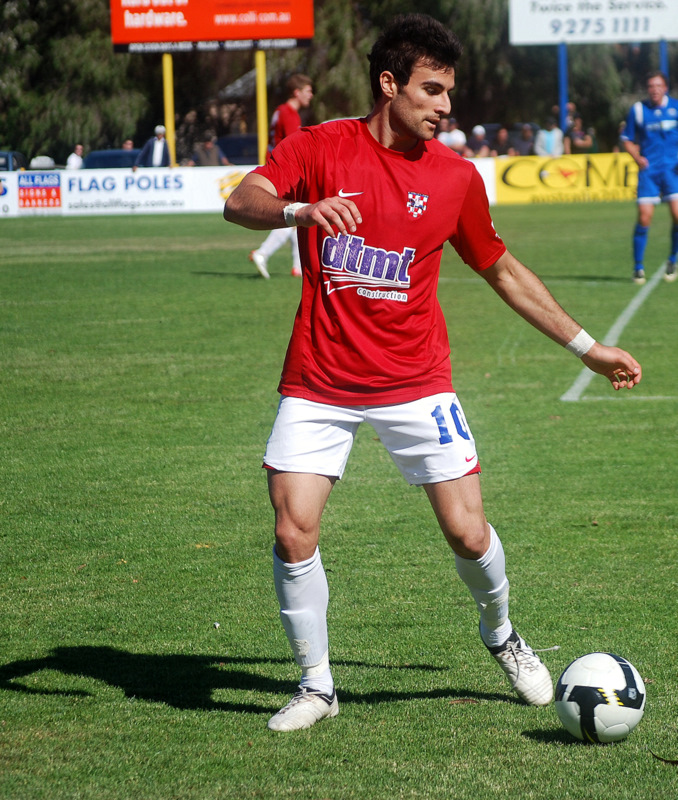

Personal information
- Date of birth: 25 February 1986 (age 40)
- Place of birth: Perth, Western Australia
- Height: 1.82 m (5 ft 11 1/2 in)
- Position: Attacking midfielder

Youth career
- Perth SC
- Stirling Lions
- Stirling Suns

Senior career*
Years	Team	Apps	(Gls)
2003–2005	Perth SC	60	(18)
2005–2008	Perth Glory	25	(0)
2008–2010	Western Knights	60	(25)
2010–2011	Solo FC	15	(6)
2011–2012	Yangon United	18	(8)
2012–2013	Balcatta SC	20	(14)
2013–2014	Perth SC	2	(2)
2014–2015	Stirling Lions	18	(16)
2015–2016	Inglewood United	17	(6)
2016–2018	Stirling Lions	50	(31)
2024-	Subiaco AFC	4	(1)

International career^{‡}
2006–2007	Australia U-23	6	(1)
- * Club domestic league appearances and goals as of 19 September 2018 ‡ National team caps and goals as of 4 December 2007

David Micevski (born 25 February 1986) is an Australian footballer who has played for Stirling Lions. He is currently playing for State League 1 club Subiaco AFC.

== Club career ==
He was identified by former Perth Glory technical manager, Mich d'Avray as one of the brightest young prospects in the WA State League. He played an instrumental part of Perth Soccer Club's victorious league and cup double winning team in 2005.

The attack-minded midfielder signed on loan to Perth Glory for the tail end of the 2005/2006 A-League season, mainly due to injuries to the club's first team players. The club signed him on a full term contract before the start of the 2006/2007 season and his performances for the club has led to his call up to the Olyroos Australian national under 23 side. After parting ways with Perth Glory he signed for the Western Knights and was the WA State League player of the year for the 2009 season, and helped Western Knights to consecutive premierships and a cup winners medal during his time at the club.

He then spent a season in the Indonesian Premier Liga playing for Solo FC where he quickly became a fan favourite with the locals. Myanmar champions Yangon United then showed interest in the midfielder and he signed with the club on the back end of the 2011–2012 season.

Since playing back in Western Australia in the National Premier League, the midfielder won the Golden boot award in 2014 after scoring 16 goals in as many games from his midfield role.

In 2016 while playing for Stirling Lions in the National Premier League, Micevski became the first player in Western Australia to be awarded the McInerney Ford Gold Medal for the league's best & fairest for the second time after accumulating a record 38 votes with 9 man of the match performances throughout the regular season. He also netted 17 goals in the regular season and won the goal of the season.

== International career ==
He played for Australia Under 23 National Team "Olyroos" from 2006 to 2008, He was capped at International level for the Olyroos and was part of the Australian qualifiers for the 2008 Beijing Olympic games.
