= Ron Smith (footballer, born 1949) =

English footballer and coach (born 1949)

Personal information
- Full name: Ronald Arthur Smith
- Date of birth: 5 May 1949 (age 77)
- Place of birth: London, England
- Position: Midfielder

Senior career*
Years	Team	Apps	(Gls)
1966	Tottenham Hotspur		
1968–1971	Borough Road College		
1971–1972	Kingstonian		
1972–1973	Southall		
1974–1975	South Melbourne		

Managerial career
- 1979: Keflavik
- 1986–1995: AIS
- 1995–1997: Sabah
- 1998–1999: Johor FC
- 2005: Australia (interim)
- 2006–2007: Perth Glory
- 2007–2008: Australia U23 (asst.)
- 2008–2009: Australia (advisor)
- 2014: Pahang
- * Club domestic league appearances and goals

Ronald Smith (born 5 May 1949) is an English footballer and coach. He is a technical analyst for the Australia national team.

== Playing career ==
Smith played as a junior for North London team Tottenham Hotspur before injury forced an end to his top flight football ambitions. He then went on to play for a number of non-league teams in England before emigrating to Australia to play for South Melbourne SC in 1974.

== Managerial career ==
=== Victoria ===
Smith's coaching career started in Victoria in 1975 when he was appointed State Director of Coaching, a position he held until 1978. During that time he was assistant national coach to Jim Shoulder for 26 matches including the 1978 World Cup qualification. Smith's interest and involvement in Coach Education for over three decades was recognised by the Australian Coaching Council, when they presented him with the Eunice Gill Award and by the Australian Soccer Federation in their Roll of Honour for Meritorious Contribution.

=== AIS ===
Smith worked as the Assistant Coach of the football (soccer) program at the Australian Institute of Sport in Canberra from 1982 to 1986, and then as Head Coach from 1986 to 1996. During this period he mentored a number of players who played for the Socceroos or professionally overseas.

=== Malaysia ===
Smith coached Sabah in 1995, for eight matches at the end of the season. The team went from 13th position to 5th in the league and qualified for the Malaysia Cup. The team were knocked out in the semi-final of the Malaysia Cup by penalty shoot-out by Pahang. In 1996 Sabah won the 'M' League for the first time in the club's history and reached the Malaysia Cup Final, losing to Selangor in a penalty shoot-out in front of 82,000 spectators. In 1997 Sabah came third in the 'M' League. Smith was voted Coach of the Year in recognition for his achievements in 1996, the trophy presented by Kevin Keegan. Smith coached Johor FC in 1998 and 1999 laying the foundation for the first club team ever to be promoted to the "M' League in 2000. Smith served as Technical Director to the Football Association of Malaysia between 1999 and 2002 and established the Bukit Jalil development program based on the Australian Institute of Sport model.

=== Perth Glory ===
In July 2006, Smith resigned as full-time Technical Manager with the FFA to take on the vacant coach's job at Perth Glory FC. David Mitchell served as Smith's assistant and the two planned to rebuild the squad for the 2007–08 season.

On 3 November 2007, Smith was sacked as Perth Glory's coach, after 11 matches without a win that season and five points adrift at the bottom of the A-League table. Perth Glory were under administration financially, crippled with the injuries to key players and unable to recruit new players until an owner was found. During this time two key talents were unearthed from the local league who have since gone on to sign with clubs overseas. Nikita Rukavytsya and Jimmy Downey. Perth reached the final of the Pre-season Cup at the start of the 2007–08 season losing to Adelaide Utd.

=== Australia ===
Smith spent time in 2003 at Liverpool assisting Gérard Houllier with video analysis before returning to his adopted Australia in 2004 to serve as Technical Manager to Football Federation Australia.

In June 2005, Smith was appointed interim coach of the Australia national team until the appointment of Guus Hiddink when he resumed his position as Technical Manager. Ron Smith uses "Sportscode" digital video analysis software that allows coaches to analyse football video by breaking the play down into its component parts.

From January 2008, Smith assisted Graham Arnold with the Olympic team through to the finals in Beijing in August that year and worked as the technical analyst to Pim Verbeek to the World Cup Finals in Germany in June 2010.

Smith continues his role as technical analyst to the Olympic team and Senior National Team who have qualified for their third successive World Cup in Brazil next year.

He was linked to a technical director's role at NSW Premier League club Sydney Olympic and signed in December 2009 as a Technical Consultant. Smith provided advice to Sydney Olympic during the 2010 season.

In the 2009–10 'A' League season the 'Coaching Clinic' series on Fox Sport's Match Day Saturday program, was written and produced by Ron Smith.

In August 2010, Ron Smith was the chief scout for Nike, in "The Chance" and nominated Tom Rogic, who was voted in the top eight from one hundred trialists from all over the world, to spend a year at the Nike Academy in England in 2011. Tom Rogic has since played for the Australian National Team and signed with Celtic FC.

=== Pahang ===
Smith returns to Malaysia at the end of 2013 to join Pahang, replacing Dollah Salleh who joined PDRM FA. Signing a 12-month contract, Smith was tasked to improve the newly crowned 2013 Malaysia Cup champions for the 2014 season.

In early March 2014, Smith's contract was mutually terminated with Pahang.
