= ECU Joondalup =

University campus in Joondalup, Western Australia

Coordinates: 31.752°S 115.773°E

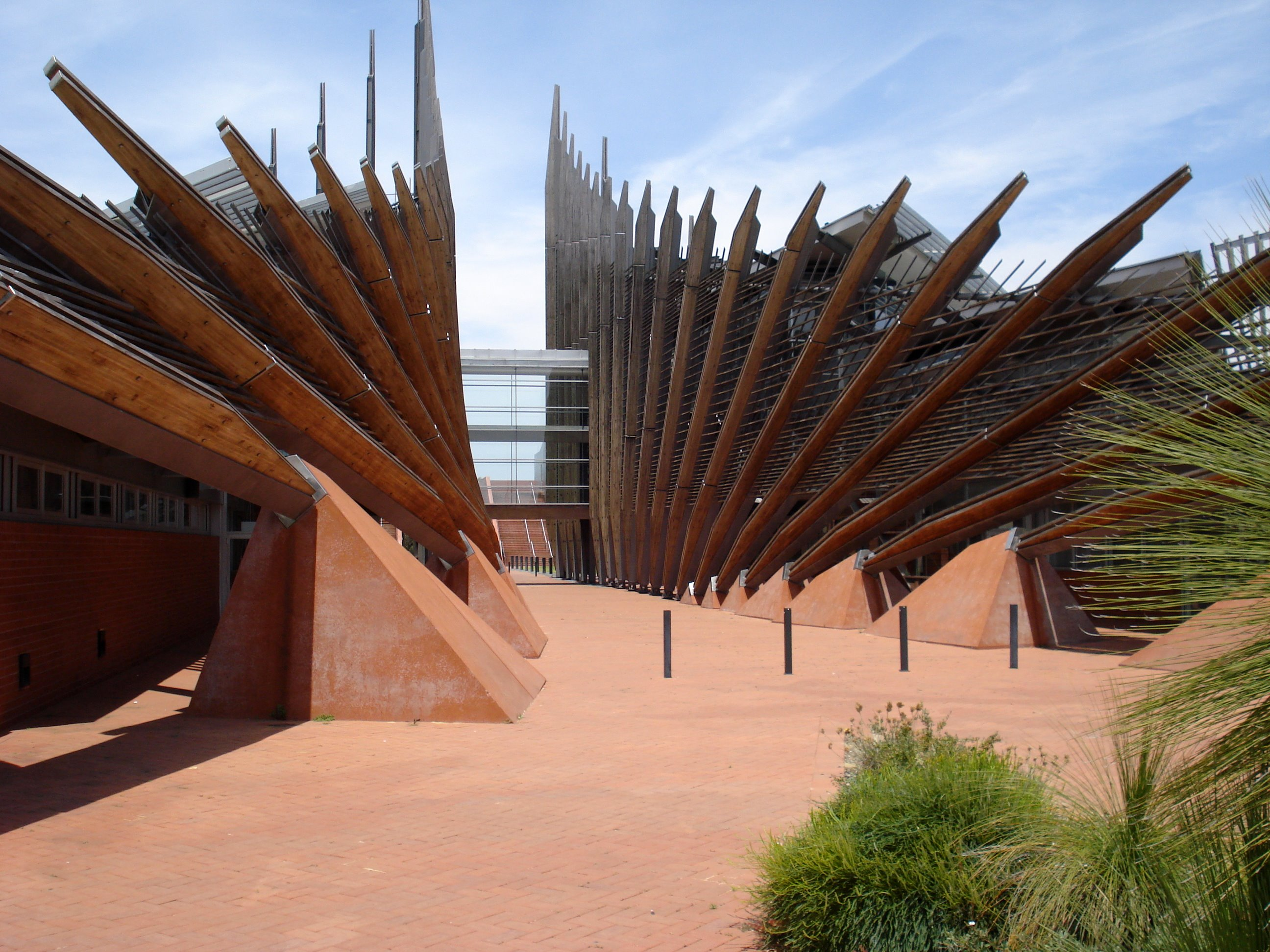
ECU Joondalup from entrance

ECU Joondalup is a university campus of Edith Cowan University located in the suburb of Joondalup, Western Australia around 25 km away from Perth. The campus also forms part of the Joondalup Learning Precinct, which includes the West Coast College of TAFE to the north and the Western Australian Police Academy to the northeast. It is serviced by the Joondalup CAT and is close to the Mitchell Freeway.

== Schools and facilities ==
The Joondalup campus is the headquarters of Edith Cowan University, featuring state-of-the-art, industry-specific facilities including a $5,000,000 worth sport centre, simulation nursing wards, a 5-level science building, and advanced engineering labs. Located 25km from Perth CBD, it hosts key schools of Nursing, Engineering, Education, Science, and Business & Law (until 2025). In 2026, the WAAPA and School of Business & Law moved to the ECU City campus.

The School of Engineering features specialised labs for civil, mechanical, electrical, and chemical engineering, including facilities like a 3D printer maker-space, robotics, and a personalised motorsport laboratory. The School of Science accommodates a 5-level building containing 2,500 sq meters of laboratory space, specialised cyber security industry spaces, and environmental facilities like aquariums and greenhouses. The School of Nursing and Midwifery features The Health and Wellness Building with eight simulation wards with 66 beds, mimicking real-world hospital environments for hands-on clinical training.

The campus also features fully-equipped gym and recreation facility offering discounted staff/student memberships. It also features a out-door cinema in-screening Telethon Community Cinemas at the Joondalup Pines during the summer months and on-campus accommodation. The library is also a notable facility in the campus for student study, student support and even high-tech based sleeping pods which will allow students to rest and sleep.

The campus also has it own set of restaurants such as Bermuda, Roll'd, Birra Bar, Cafe Six and Boost Juice.

The campus is also known for building the world largest Periodic table in the campus.

== History ==
The campus was established in the early 1990s as the flagship campus of Edith Cowan University, the campus grew from a small compact site in 1984 into a major 17,000-student hub. It was built on a planned urban development initiative, later becoming the university's headquarters following a 1998 "campus consolidation" strategy that shifted operations from the ECU Churchlands campus.

== Incidents ==
In 2016, the campus was asked to evacuate due to an arson attack on the campus by a 26-year-old man. Two buildings in the campus suffered damaged. Hundreds of university staff, students and children had earlier been evacuated from the campus, including from the university's childcare centre. On that day all the classes and lectures were closed.
