= A-League transfers for 2009–10 season =

This list contains the transfers for the 2009–10 A-League season. It includes all transfers to an A-League club, but not players leaving A-League clubs. Promotions from youth squads to the first squad of the same club are also not included.

Name	From	To	Date signed
Steve Fitzsimmons	(Australia) Beenleigh	Gold Coast United	9 September 2008
Scott Higgins	(Australia) Adelaide United	Gold Coast United	7 October 2008
Jess Vanstrattan	(Italy) Juventus	Gold Coast United	7 October 2008
Shane Smeltz	(New Zealand) Wellington Phoenix	Gold Coast United	4 November 2008
Paul Kohler	(Australia) Sutherland Sharks	North Queensland Fury	4 November 2008
Brendon Santalab	(Australia) Sydney FC	North Queensland Fury	14 November 2008
Jacob Timpano	(Australia) Sydney FC	North Queensland Fury	14 November 2008
Robbie Middleby	(Australia) Sydney FC	North Queensland Fury	14 November 2008
Jeremy Brockie	(New Zealand) Team Wellington	North Queensland Fury	15 November 2008
Glen Moss	(New Zealand) Wellington Phoenix	Melbourne Victory	18 November 2008
Adam Griffiths	(Australia) Newcastle Jets	Gold Coast United	20 November 2008
Ufuk Talay	(Japan) Avispa Fukuoka	North Queensland Fury	21 November 2008
Iain Fyfe	(Australia) Sydney FC	Adelaide United	25 November 2008
James Robinson	(Australia) Perth Glory	North Queensland Fury	27 November 2008
Marton Vass	(Australia) Sutherland Sharks	North Queensland Fury	27 November 2008
Steve Pantelidis	(Australia) Melbourne Victory	Gold Coast United	28 November 2008
Zenon Caravella	(Netherlands) FC Omniworld	Gold Coast United	28 November 2008
Daniel Piorkowski	(Australia) Newcastle Jets	Gold Coast United	28 November 2008
Matthew Osman	(Australia) Central Coast Mariners	Gold Coast United	28 November 2008
Kristian Rees	(New Zealand) Wellington Phoenix	Gold Coast United	28 November 2008
Jason Spagnuolo	(Australia) Adelaide United	North Queensland Fury	15 December 2008
Jefferson	(Brazil) Criciúma	Gold Coast United	15 December 2008
Milson	(Brazil) Tombense	Gold Coast United	15 December 2008
Robson	(Brazil) Operário (MS)	Gold Coast United	15 December 2008
Chris Grossman	(Australia) Queensland Roar	North Queensland Fury	24 December 2008
Tahj Minniecon	(Australia) Queensland Roar	Gold Coast United	3 January 2009
Nikolai Topor-Stanley	(Australia) Perth Glory	Newcastle Jets	3 January 2009
Jason Čulina	(Netherlands) PSV Eindhoven	Gold Coast United	4 February 2009
Diego	(Australia) Adelaide United	Wellington Phoenix	23 January 2009
Sasho Petrovski	(Australia) Central Coast Mariners	Newcastle Jets	3 February 2009
Robbie Fowler	(England) Blackburn Rovers	North Queensland Fury	4 February 2009
Fabio Vignaroli	(Greece) Panthrakikos	Newcastle Jets	8 February 2009
Victor Sikora	(United States) FC Dallas	Perth Glory	16 February 2009
Adam Hughes	(Republic of Ireland) Drogheda United	Adelaide United	3 March 2009
Henrique	(Brazil) América Mineiro	Queensland Roar	4 March 2009
Karol Kisel	(Czech Republic) Sparta Prague	Sydney FC	3 April 2009
Sebastian Ryall	(Australia) Melbourne Victory	Sydney FC	7 April 2009
Chris Greenacre	(England) Tranmere Rovers	Wellington Phoenix	21 April 2009
Andy Todd	(England) Derby County	Perth Glory	22 April 2009
Jacob Burns	(Romania) FC Unirea Urziceni	Perth Glory	4 May 2009
Surat Sukha	(Thailand) Chonburi	Melbourne Victory	May 2009
Branko Jelic	(Germany) Energie Cottbus	Perth Glory	18 April 2009
Aleks Vrteski	(North Macedonia) FK Pobeda	Perth Glory	25 May 2009
Lloyd Owusu	(England) Cheltenham Town	Adelaide United	4 June 2009
Mile Sterjovski	(England) Derby County	Perth Glory	12 June 2009
Anderson	(Brazil) Flamengo	Gold Coast United	22 July 2009
Byun Sung-Hwan	(South Korea) Jeju United	Sydney FC	25 June 2009
Inseob Shin	(South Korea) Konkuk University	Adelaide United	29 June 2009
Chris Coyne	(England) Colchester United	Perth Glory	10 July 2009
Stephan Keller	(Netherlands) De Graafschap	Sydney FC	27 July 2009
Mark Rudan	(Liechtenstein) FC Vaduz	Adelaide United	6 August 2009
Mathew Leckie	(Australia) Bulleen Lions	Adelaide United	2 September 2009
Robbie Kruse	(Australia) Brisbane Roar	Melbourne Victory	10 September 2009
Charlie Miller	(Australia) Brisbane Roar	Gold Coast United	11 December 2009
Liam Reddy	(Australia) Brisbane Roar	Wellington Phoenix	16 December 2009
Eugene Dadi	(Australia) Perth Glory	Wellington Phoenix	4 January 2010
