= 2009–10 Gold Coast United FC season =

Gold Coast United
2009–10 season
- Chairman: Clive Palmer
- Manager: Miron Bleiberg
- A-League: 3rd
- A-League Finals: Semi-final
- Top goalscorer: League: Shane Smeltz (19); All: Shane Smeltz (19)
- Highest home attendance: 10,024 vs Brisbane Roar (26 December 2009)
- Lowest home attendance: 2,616 vs North Queensland Fury (31 October 2009)
- Average home league attendance: 5,434 (20 February 2010)
Home colours	Away colours

The 2009–10 season was Gold Coast United's inaugural season in the A-League, becoming one of two new expansion clubs in the Australian state of Queensland.

== Transfers ==
=== In ===
Date	Position	Nationality	Name	From	Fee	Ref.
7 October 2008	GK	(Australia)	Jess Vanstrattan	Juventus	Free	
5 November 2008	FW	(New Zealand)	Shane Smeltz	Wellington Phoenix	Free	
3 December 2008	DF	(Australia)	Adam Griffiths	Newcastle Jets	Free	
3 December 2008	MF	(Brazil)	Robson	Cabofriense	Free	
3 December 2008	MF	(Brazil)	Jefferson		Free	
3 December 2008	DF	(Australia)	Daniel Piorkowski	Newcastle Jets	Free	
3 December 2008	DF	(Australia)	Kristian Rees	Adelaide City	Free	
3 December 2008	MF	(Australia)	Matthew Osman	Central Coast Mariners	Free	
3 December 2008	MF	(Australia)	Zenon Caravella	Omniworld	Free	
3 December 2008	FW	(Australia)	Steve Fitzsimmons	Beenleigh	Free	
3 December 2008	MF	(Australia)	Steve Pantelidis	Melbourne Victory	Free	
9 December 2008	MF	(Australia)	James Brown	AIS	Free	
10 December 2008	FW	(Australia)	Andrew Barisic	Melbourne Knights	Free	
15 December 2008	FW	(Brazil)	Milson	Tombense	Free	
3 January 2009	FW	(Australia)	Tahj Minniecon	AIS	Free	
5 January 2009	DF	(Australia)	Michael Thwaite	Brann	Free	
14 January 2009	DF	(Netherlands)	Bas van den Brink	Omniworld	Free	
14 January 2009	FW	(Australia)	Joel Porter	Hartlepool United	Free	
14 January 2009	MF	(Australia)	Jason Culina	PSV Eindhoven	Free	
11 December 2009	MF	(Scotland)	Charlie Miller	Brisbane Roar	Free	
10 January 2010	DF	(Bosnia and Herzegovina)	Dino Djulbic	Rot Weiss Ahlen	Free	
	GK	(Australia)	Scott Higgins	Wellington Phoenix	Free	
	DF	(Ivory Coast)	Adama Traoré	EF Yéo Martial	Free	
	MF	(Australia)	Richard Greer		Free	

=== Out ===
Date	Position	Nationality	Name	To	Fee	Ref.
14 August 2009	DF	(Australia)	Adam Griffiths	Al-Shabab		

=== Loans in ===
Date from	Position	Nationality	Name	From	Date to	Ref.
22 June 2009	MF	(Brazil)	Anderson	Criciúma	End of season	
23 September 2009	DF	(Australia)	Mark Byrnes	APIA Leichhardt Tigers	Four weeks	

=== Released ===
Date	Position	Nationality	Name	Joined	Date
14 January 2010	FW	(Brazil)	Milson		
2010	MF	(Scotland)	Charlie Miller	Clyde	10 February 2011

== Squad ==
As of match played 20 February 2010

No.	Name	Nationality	Position	Date of birth (Age (Note: Age as of the end of the season))	Signed from	Signed in	Contract ends	Apps.	Goals
Goalkeepers
1	Jess Vanstrattan	(Australia)	GK	19 July 1982 (aged 27)	Verona	2008	2010	18	0
20	Scott Higgins	(Australia)	GK	9 June 1976 (aged 33)	Wellington Phoenix	2009		10	0
Defenders
3	Michael Thwaite	(Australia)	DF	2 May 1983 (aged 26)	Brann	2009		28	0
4	Daniel Piorkowski	(Australia)	DF	12 January 1984 (aged 26)	Newcastle Jets	2009	2011	2	0
13	Bas van den Brink	(Netherlands)	DF	11 September 1982 (aged 27)	Omniworld	2009		27	1
16	Kristian Rees	(Australia)	DF	6 January 1980 (aged 30)	Adelaide City	2009	2011	26	2
22	Adama Traoré	(Ivory Coast)	DF	3 February 1990 (aged 20)	EF Yéo Martial	2009		11	0
36	Dino Djulbic	(Bosnia and Herzegovina)	DF	16 February 1983 (aged 27)	Rot Weiss Ahlen	2010		8	0
	Zac Anderson	(Australia)	DF	30 April 1991 (aged 18)	QAS	2009		3	0
	Ben Wearing	(Australia)	DF	8 May 1989 (aged 20)	Musgrave	2009		1	0
Midfielders
2	Steve Pantelidis	(Australia)	MF	17 August 1983 (aged 26)	Melbourne Victory	2009	2011	20	0
5	Robson	(Brazil)	MF	3 November 1986 (aged 23)	Cabofriense	2009	2010	11	1
7	Zenon Caravella	(Australia)	MF	17 May 1983 (aged 26)	Omniworld	2009	2011	24	1
8	Jefferson	(Brazil)	MF	28 March 1982 (aged 27)		2009	2010	1	0
10	Jason Culina	(Australia)	MF	5 August 1980 (aged 29)	PSV Eindhoven	2009	2012	26	3
11	Charlie Miller	(Scotland)	MF	18 March 1976 (aged 33)	Brisbane Roar	2009	2010	10	1
17	Matthew Osman	(Australia)	MF	29 July 1983 (aged 26)	Central Coast Mariners	2009	2011	15	0
18	James Brown	(Australia)	MF	19 February 1990 (aged 20)	AIS	2009	2012	9	1
21	Richard Greer	(Australia)	MF			2009		0	0
23	Steve Fitzsimmons	(Australia)	MF	7 September 1976 (aged 33)	Beenleigh	2009	2010	19	2
24	Anderson	(Brazil)	MF	10 January 1983 (aged 27)	Loan from Criciúma	2009	2010	26	0
	Mitch Bevan	(Australia)	MF	20 February 1991 (aged 19)	Brisbane Roar	2009		1	0
Forwards
9	Shane Smeltz	(New Zealand)	FW	29 September 1981 (aged 28)	Wellington Phoenix	2008	2012	26	19
14	Joel Porter	(Australia)	FW	25 December 1978 (aged 31)	Hartlepool United	2009		24	5
15	Tahj Minniecon	(Australia)	FW	13 February 1989 (aged 21)	AIS	2009	2012	17	1
19	Andrew Barisic	(Australia)	FW	22 March 1986 (aged 23)	Melbourne Knights	2009	2010	6	1
26	Golgol Mebrahtu	(Australia)	FW	28 August 1990 (aged 19)	Brisbane Strikers	2009		6	0
Left during the season
6	Adam Griffiths	(Australia)	FW	21 August 1979 (aged 30)	Newcastle Jet	2009	2012	1	0
11	Milson	(Brazil)	FW	24 November 1977 (aged 32)	Tombense	2009	2010	9	0
27	Mark Byrnes	(Australia)	DF	8 February 1982 (aged 28)	APIA Leichhardt Tigers	2009	2009	1	0

== Friendlies ==
23 June 2009	Gold Coast United	2–0	North Queensland Fury	Gold Coast
17:00 AEST (UTC+10)	Pantelidis 85'; Lustica 89'			Stadium: Skilled Park; Attendance: 3,000

27 June 2009	New Caledonia	0–5	Gold Coast United	Nouméa, New Caledonia
17:00 AEST (UTC+10)		Report	Barisic 5'; Osman 68'; Mebrahtu 78'; Pantelidis 86'; Thwaite 89'	Stadium: Stade Numa Daly

1 July 2009	Young Lions	0–4	Gold Coast United	Hougang, Singapore
17:00 AEST (UTC+10)		Report	Qalyyim 27' (o.g.); Thwaite 35'; Porter 51'; Culina 81'	Stadium: Hougang Stadium

3 July 2009	Hong Kong	0–5	Gold Coast United	Happy Valley, Hong Kong
17:00 AEST (UTC+10)			Milson 30', 31'; Mebrahtu 46'; Barisic 51', 81'	Stadium: Happy Valley

8 July 2009	Gold Coast United	2–1	Fulham	Gold Coast
19:00 AEST (UTC+10)	Milson 80'; Smeltz 86'		Murphy 15'	Stadium: Skilled Park; Attendance: 10,336

12 July 2009	Byron Bay Select XI	1–5	Gold Coast United	Byron Bay
15:30 AEST (UTC+10)	Milson 80'; Smeltz 86'		Murphy 15'	Stadium: Byron Recreation Grounds; Attendance: 2,000

14 July 2009	Rochedale Rovers	1–1	Gold Coast United	Gold Coast
19:00 AEST (UTC+10)	Goal		Spencer 66'	Stadium: Skilled Park

16 July 2009	Tweed Valley Kings	0–5	Gold Coast United	Gold Coast
19:00 AEST (UTC+10)				Stadium: Skilled Park

18 July 2009	Gold Coast United	2–2	Central Coast Mariners	Gold Coast
15:00 AEST (UTC+10)	Thwaite (red card); Traore 81'; Smeltz 90+1'		Bojic 49'; Kwasnik 53'	Stadium: Skilled Park; Referee: Matthew Gillett

25 July 2009	Perth Glory	0–1	Gold Coast United	South Bunbury
17:00 AEST (UTC+10)			Porter 23'	Stadium: Hands Oval

== Competitions ==
=== A-League ===
==== League table ====
Pos	Team	Pld	W	D	L	GF	GA	GD	Pts	Qualification
1	Sydney FC (C)	27	15	3	9	35	23	+12	48	Qualification for 2011 AFC Champions League group stage and Finals series
2	Melbourne Victory	27	14	5	8	47	32	+15	47	Qualification for 2011 AFC Champions League group stage and Finals series
3	Gold Coast United	27	13	5	9	39	35	+4	44	Qualification for Finals series
4	Wellington Phoenix	27	10	10	7	37	29	+8	40	Qualification for Finals series
5	Perth Glory	27	11	6	10	40	34	+6	39	Qualification for Finals series
6	Newcastle Jets	27	10	4	13	33	45	−12	34	Qualification for Finals series
7	North Queensland Fury	27	8	8	11	29	46	−17	32	
8	Central Coast Mariners	27	7	9	11	32	29	+3	30	
9	Brisbane Roar	27	8	6	13	32	42	−10	30	
10	Adelaide United	27	7	8	12	24	33	−9	29	

Source: ultimatealeague.com
Rules for classification: 1) points; 2) goal difference; 3) number of goals scored.
(C) Champions

==== Results summary ====
Overall								Home						Away					
Pld	W	D	L	GF	GA	GD	Pts	W	D	L	GF	GA	GD	W	D	L	GF	GA	GD
27	13	5	9	39	35	+4	44	9	2	3	25	11	+14	4	3	6	14	24	−10

Last updated: 13 February 2010.
Source: See Results

==== Results ====
8 August 2009 1	Brisbane Roar	1–3	Gold Coast United	Brisbane
19:30 AEST (UTC+10)	Nichols (yellow card) 4'; Kruse (yellow card) 26'; Tiatto (yellow card) 41'; Moore (yellow card) 45'; Miller (yellow card) 62' van Dijk 89' (pen.)	Summary	Smeltz 17' (yellow card) 82'; Culina 59' (yellow card) 89'; Robson (yellow card) 64' (goal) 90'; Pantelidis (yellow card) 66'; Higgins (yellow card) 90'	Stadium: Suncorp Stadium; Attendance: 19,902; Referee: Peter Green

15 August 2009 2	Gold Coast United	5–0	North Queensland Fury	Gold Coast
17:30 AEST (UTC+10)	Smeltz 30', 55' (pen.), 63', 64'; Pantelidis (yellow card) 79'; Minniecon 80'	Summary	Busch (yellow card) 54'; Dodd (yellow card) 56'; Griffiths (yellow card) 60'; Middleby (yellow card) 69'; Kohler (yellow card) 86'	Stadium: Skilled Park; Attendance: 7,526; Referee: Chris Beath

21 August 2009 3	Adelaide United	0–2	Gold Coast United	Adelaide
20:00 AEST (UTC+10)		Summary	Smeltz 13'; Fitzsimmons (yellow card) 23' (goal) 51' van den Brink (yellow card) 40'; Pantelidis (yellow card) 82'	Stadium: Coopers Stadium; Attendance: 12,741; Referee: Matthew Breeze

30 August 2009 4	Newcastle Jets	1–0	Gold Coast United	Newcastle
15:00 AEST (UTC+10)	Milicevic (yellow card) 38'; Rooney 39'; Petrovski (yellow card) 45'	Summary	Traoré (yellow card) 51'; Thwaite (yellow card) 88'	Stadium: EnergyAustralia Stadium; Attendance: 6,390; Referee: Matthew Breeze

5 September 2009 5	Gold Coast United	2–1	Sydney	Gold Coast
17:00 AEST (UTC+10)	Robson (yellow card) 6'; Smeltz 45+1', 56'	Summary	Corica 75'	Stadium: Skilled Park; Attendance: 6,800; Referee: Strebre Delovski

13 September 2009 6	Perth Glory	2–2	Gold Coast United	Perth
17:00 AEST (UTC+10)	Jelić 14'; Sikora 16'	Summary	Pantelidis (yellow card) 39'; Burns 53' (o.g.); Smeltz 90+1'	Stadium: ME Bank Stadium; Attendance: 9,408; Referee: Matthew Breeze

19 September 2009 7	Central Coast Mariners	3–0	Gold Coast United	Gosford
19:30 AEST (UTC+10)	Travis (yellow card) 16' (goal) 26'; Simon 54'; Heffernan (yellow card) 63'; Hutchinson 70'	Summary	Smeltz (yellow card) 9' (yellow-red card) 69'; Thwaite (yellow card) 83'	Stadium: Bluetongue Stadium; Attendance: 7,394; Referee: Matthew Breeze

26 September 2009 8	Gold Coast United	2–3	Melbourne Victory	Gold Coast
19:30 AEST (UTC+10)	Culina 18' (pen.); Fitzsimmons (red card) 29'; Porter 45'; Pantelidis (yellow card) 69' van den Brink (yellow card) 86'	Summary	Hernández 22'; A.Thompson 43'; Brebner (yellow card) 45'; K.Muscat 86' (pen.)	Stadium: Skilled Park; Attendance: 5,063; Referee: Peter Green

2 October 2009 9	Gold Coast United	0–0	Wellington Phoenix	Gold Coast
20:00 AEST (UTC+10)	Robson (yellow card) 89'	Summary	Lia (yellow card) 89'	Stadium: Skilled Park; Attendance: 4,209; Referee: Gerard Parsons

11 October 2009 10	Brisbane Roar	0–1	Gold Coast United	Brisbane
16:00 AEST (UTC+10)	McCloughan (yellow card) 42'; Nichols (yellow card) 63'; McKay (yellow card) 67'; Karlović (yellow card) 71'	Summary	Porter 31'	Stadium: Suncorp Stadium; Attendance: 8,882; Referee: Ben Williams

18 October 2009 11	Gold Coast United	2–1	Perth Glory	Gold Coast
16:00 AEST (UTC+10)	Neville 13' (o.g.); Smeltz 56'; Pantelidis (yellow card) 84'	Summary	Howarth 55'; Pellegrino (yellow card) 68'; Coyne (yellow card) 90'	Stadium: Skilled Park; Attendance: 4,509; Referee: Matthew Breeze

25 October 2009 12	Wellington Phoenix	6–0	Gold Coast United	Wellington
17:00 AEST (UTC+10)	Greenacre (yellow card) 25' (goal) 54'; Daniel 28', 53'; Brown 48' (yellow card) 56'; Ifill 59'; Jiang (yellow card) 78'; Hearfield 82'	Summary	Pantelidis (yellow card) 38'; Robson (yellow card) 88'	Stadium: Westpac Stadium; Attendance: 6,571; Referee: Peter O'Leary

31 October 2009 13	Gold Coast United	0–2	North Queensland Fury	Gold Coast
20:00 AEST (UTC+10)		Summary	Griffiths (yellow card) 39'; Fowler 64', 76' (pen.)	Stadium: Skilled Park; Attendance: 2,616; Referee: Craig Zetter

7 November 2009 14	Gold Coast United	1–0	Sydney	Gold Coast
20:00 AEST (UTC+10)	Smeltz 36'; Culina (yellow card) 39'; Pantelidis (yellow card) 89'	Summary	McFlynn (yellow card) 36'; Cole (yellow card) 25'; Musialik (yellow card) 39'	Stadium: Skilled Park; Attendance: 5,364; Referee: Ben Williams

20 November 2009 15	Adelaide United	1–1	Gold Coast United	Adelaide
19:00 AEST (UTC+10)	Hughes (yellow card) 7'; Leckie 90+3'	Summary	Rees (red card) 33'; Anderson (yellow card) 45'; Fitzsimmons 64'; Brown (yellow card) 85'	Stadium: Hindmarsh Stadium; Attendance: 9,578; Referee: Chris Beath

28 November 2009 16	Melbourne Victory	4–0	Gold Coast United	Melbourne
18:00 AEST (UTC+10)	Kruse 28'; Ward 45+1'; A. Thompson 54'; Vargas 68'	Summary		Stadium: Etihad Stadium; Attendance: 20,537; Referee: Ben Williams

5 December 2009 17	Gold Coast United	2–1	Central Coast Mariners	Gold Coast
20:00 AEST (UTC+10)	Smeltz 67'; Rees (yellow card) 74'; Barisic 76'; Culina (yellow card) 87'	Summary	Simon 38'; Heffernan (yellow card) 40'	Stadium: Skilled Park; Attendance: 4,117; Referee: Daniel Goodwin

13 December 2009 18	Newcastle Jets	3–2	Gold Coast United	Newcastle
16:00 AEST (UTC+10)	Wheelhouse 6' (yellow card) 25'; Kantarovski (yellow card) 43'; Elrich (yellow card) 53'; Rooney 70'; Petrovski 82'	Summary	Smeltz 44' (pen.), 84'; Anderson (yellow card) 50'; Pantelidis (yellow card) 65' van den Brink (yellow card) 77'	Stadium: EnergyAustralia Stadium; Attendance: 5,254; Referee: Ben Williams

20 December 2009 19	Gold Coast United	2–0	Perth Glory	Gold Coast
18:00 AEST (UTC+10)	Smeltz 3'; Pantelidis (yellow card) 40'; Miller (yellow card) 69' (goal) 76'; Barisic (yellow card) 90'	Summary	Todd (yellow card) 18'; Sterjovski (yellow card) 62'; Coyne (yellow card) 65'; Srhoj (yellow card) 75'	Stadium: Skilled Park; Attendance: 4,310; Referee: Chris Beath

26 December 2009 20	Gold Coast United	5–1	Brisbane Roar	Gold Coast
17:00 AEST (UTC+10)	Rees (yellow card) 23' (goal) 45+1', 53'; Pantelidis (yellow card) 25'; Smeltz 50' (pen.), 61', 77'	Summary	McKay 7'; Moore (yellow card) 88'	Stadium: Skilled Park; Attendance: 10,024; Referee: Strebre Delovski

9 January 2010 21	Gold Coast United	1–1	Adelaide United	Gold Coast
20:00 AEST (UTC+10)	Smeltz (yellow card) 41' (goal) 90'; Caravella (yellow card) 66'	Summary	T.Dodd 20'	Stadium: Skilled Park; Attendance: 6,556; Referee: Peter Green

13 January 2010 22	Gold Coast United	2–0	Newcastle Jets	Gold Coast
19:30 AEST (UTC+10)	Culina 33'; Anderson (yellow card) 36'; Brown 37'	Summary	Abbas (yellow card) 57'	Stadium: Skilled Park; Attendance: 4,853; Referee: Chris Beath

17 January 2010 23	Sydney	0–1	Gold Coast United	Sydney
16:00 AEST (UTC+10)	Colosimo (yellow card) 26'; Bridge (yellow card) 55'	Summary	Porter 19'; Brown (yellow card) 70'; Fitzsimmons (yellow card) 87'; Culina (yellow card) 90'	Stadium: Sydney Football Stadium; Attendance: 14,941; Referee: Ben Williams

22 January 2010 24	Central Coast Mariners	1–1	Gold Coast United	Gosford
AEST (UTC+10)	Clark (yellow card) 21'; Mrdja 68' (pen.); Boogaard (yellow card) 69' (yellow-red card) 71'; Hutchinson (yellow card) 71'	Summary	Porter 66'	Stadium: Bluetongue Stadium; Attendance: 5,724; Referee: Chris Beath

29 January 2010 25	Gold Coast United	1–0	Melbourne Victory	Gold Coast
19:30 AEST (UTC+10)	Pantelidis (yellow card) 34'; Miller (yellow card) 45'; Caravella 77' (yellow card) 78'; Smeltz (yellow card) 85'	Summary	Hernández (yellow card) 53'; Muscat (yellow card) 66'; Behich (yellow card) 90'	Stadium: Skilled Park; Attendance: 7,249; Referee: Chris Beath

7 February 2010 26	Gold Coast United	0–1	Wellington Phoenix	Gold Coast
18:00 AEST (UTC+10)	Miller (yellow card) 20'; Caravella (yellow card) 41'; Anderson (yellow card) 44'	Summary	Muscat (yellow card) 21'; Durante (yellow card) 42'; Ifill 45' (pen.)	Stadium: Skilled Park; Attendance: 4,202; Referee: Matthew Breeze

13 February 2010 27	North Queensland Fury	2–1	Gold Coast United	Townsville
20:10 AEST (UTC+10)	Williams 7' (yellow card) 57'; Griffiths (yellow card) 55'; Daal (yellow card) 70'; Cooke 83'; Spagnuolo (yellow card) 90'	Summary	Caravella (yellow card) 37'; Djulbic (yellow card) 40'; Culina (yellow card) 61'; Porter 62'; Miller (yellow card) 79'	Stadium: Dairy Farmers Stadium; Attendance: 8,517; Referee: Ben Williams

=== A-League Finals ===
20 February 2010 Semi-Final 3 v 6	Gold Coast United	0–0 (a.e.t.) (5–6 p)	Newcastle Jets	Gold Coast
19:00 AEST (UTC+10)	Robson (yellow card) 27'; Thwaite (yellow card) 73'	Summary; Report; Summary	Pavlović (yellow card) 90'	Stadium: Skilled Park; Attendance: 4,109; Referee: Matthew Breeze
	Penalties
	Culina (penalty scored); Djulbic (penalty scored); Thwaite (penalty scored); Anderson (penalty scored); Smeltz (penalty scored); Rees (penalty missed); Caravella (penalty missed)		(penalty scored) T.Elrich; (penalty scored) Petrovski; (penalty scored) Patafta; (penalty scored) M.Thompson; (penalty scored) Miličević; (penalty missed) Song; (penalty scored) Topor-Stanley

== Squad statistics ==
As of match played 20 February 2010

=== Appearances and goals ===
No.	Pos	Nat	Player	Total		A-League		A-League Finals	
No.	Pos	Nat	Player	Apps	Goals	Apps	Goals	Apps	Goals
1	GK	(Australia) AUS	Jess Vanstrattan	18	0	17	0	1	0
2	MF	(Australia) AUS	Steve Pantelidis	20	0	17+3	0	0	0
3	DF	(Australia) AUS	Michael Thwaite	28	0	27	0	1	0
4	DF	(Australia) AUS	Daniel Piorkowski	2	0	2	0	0	0
5	MF	(Brazil) BRA	Robson	11	1	8+2	1	1	0
7	MF	(Australia) AUS	Zenon Caravella	24	1	20+3	1	1	0
8	MF	(Brazil) BRA	Jefferson	1	0	1	0	0	0
9	FW	(New Zealand) NZL	Shane Smeltz	26	19	25	19	1	0
10	MF	(Australia) AUS	Jason Culina	26	3	25	3	1	0
11	MF	(Scotland) SCO	Charlie Miller	10	1	7+2	1	1	0
13	DF	(Netherlands) NED	Bas van den Brink	27	1	26	1	1	0
14	FW	(Australia) AUS	Joel Porter	24	5	21+2	5	1	0
15	FW	(Australia) AUS	Tahj Minniecon	17	1	7+10	1	0	0
16	DF	(Australia) AUS	Kristian Rees	26	2	24+1	2	1	0
17	MF	(Australia) AUS	Matthew Osman	15	0	5+9	0	0+1	0
18	MF	(Australia) AUS	James Brown	9	1	2+6	1	0+1	0
19	FW	(Australia) AUS	Andrew Barisic	6	1	1+5	1	0	0
20	GK	(Australia) AUS	Scott Higgins	11	0	10+1	0	0	0
22	DF	(Ivory Coast) CIV	Adama Traoré	11	0	11	0	0	0
23	MF	(Australia) AUS	Steve Fitzsimmons	19	2	10+9	2	0	0
24	MF	(Brazil) BRA	Anderson	26	0	18+7	0	1	0
25	MF	(Australia) AUS	Steven Lustica	2	0	1+1	0	0	0
26	FW	(Australia) AUS	Golgol Mebrahtu	6	0	2+4	0	0	0
36	DF	(Bosnia and Herzegovina) BIH	Dino Djulbic	8	0	5+2	0	0+1	0
	DF	(Australia) AUS	Zac Anderson	3	0	2+1	0	0	0
	MF	(Australia) AUS	Mitch Bevan	1	0	0+1	0	0	0
	DF	(Australia) AUS	Ben Wearing	1	0	1	0	0	0
Players who left Gold Coast United during the season:
6	DF	(Australia) AUS	Adam Griffiths	1	0	1	0	0	0
11	FW	(Brazil) BRA	Milson	9	0	1+8	0	0	0
27	DF	(Australia) AUS	Mark Byrnes	1	0	0+1	0	0	0

=== Goal scorers ===
Place	Position	Nation	Number	Name	A-League	A-League Finals	Total
1	FW	(New Zealand)	9	Shane Smeltz	19	0	19
2	FW	(Australia)	14	Joel Porter	5	0	5
3	MF	(Australia)	10	Jason Culina	3	0	3
4	DF	(Australia)	16	Kristian Rees	2	0	2
4	MF	(Australia)	23	Steve Fitzsimmons	2	0	2
6	MF	(Brazil)	5	Robson	1	0	1
6	FW	(Australia)	19	Andrew Barisic	1	0	1
6	DF	(Netherlands)	13	Bas van den Brink	1	0	1
6	MF	(Scotland)	11	Charlie Miller	1	0	1
6	FW	(Australia)	15	Tahj Minniecon	1	0	1
6	MF	(Australia)	18	James Brown	1	0	1
6	MF	(Australia)	7	Zenon Caravella	1	0	1
6				Own goal	1	0	1
Total					39	0	39

=== Disciplinary record ===
Position	Nation	Number	Name	A-League		A-League Finals		Total	
Position	Nation	Number	Name	Yellow card	Red card	Yellow card	Red card	Yellow card	Red card
2	(Australia)	MF	Steve Pantelidis	12	0	0	0	12	0
3	(Australia)	DF	Michael Thwaite	3	0	1	0	4	0
5	(Brazil)	MF	Robson	5	0	1	0	6	0
7	(Australia)	MF	Zenon Caravella	4	0	0	0	4	0
9	(New Zealand)	FW	Shane Smeltz	5	1	0	0	5	1
10	(Australia)	MF	Jason Culina	5	0	0	0	5	0
11	(Scotland)	MF	Charlie Miller	4	0	0	0	4	0
13	(Netherlands)	DF	Bas van den Brink	3	0	0	0	3	0
16	(Australia)	DF	Kristian Rees	2	1	0	0	2	1
18	(Australia)	MF	James Brown	2	0	0	0	2	0
19	(Australia)	FW	Andrew Barisic	1	0	0	0	1	0
20	(Australia)	GK	Scott Higgins	1	0	0	0	1	0
22	(Ivory Coast)	DF	Adama Traoré	1	0	0	0	1	0
23	(Australia)	MF	Steve Fitzsimmons	3	1	0	0	3	1
24	(Brazil)	MF	Anderson	3	0	0	0	3	0
36	(Bosnia and Herzegovina)	DF	Dino Djulbic	1	0	0	0	1	0
	(Australia)	DF	Zac Anderson	1	0	0	0	1	0
Total				56	3	2	0	58	3
