= 2009–10 Melbourne Victory FC season =

Melbourne Victory
2009–10 season
- Manager: Ernie Merrick
- A-League: 2nd
- AFC Champions League: Group Stage
- Top goalscorer: Carlos Hernandez (13)
- Highest home attendance: 30,668 vs Sydney FC (9 October 2009)
- Lowest home attendance: 15,168 vs Newcastle Jets (3 September 2009)
- Average home league attendance: 20,750
Home colours	Away colours

The Melbourne Victory 2009–10 season was Melbourne Victory's fifth A-League season.

== Season summary ==
From the 2009–10 season, Greek gambling giant Intralot became the Melbourne Victory's new major sponsor to replace Samsung in a two-year deal valued at $2 million. Their logo subsequently featured on the front of Melbourne Victory's strip.

The Victory made some off-season changes by releasing Steve Pantelidis and Michael Thwaite to Gold Coast United, Sebastian Ryall was transferred to Sydney FC, and veteran goalkeeper Michael Theoklitos ended his contract and later joined Norwich City F.C. Moreover, José Luis López Ramírez's loan spell was terminated from Deportivo Saprissa and Daniel Allsopp moved to Al Rayyan.

Several new signings were made, bringing New Zealand international goalkeeper Glen Moss from Wellington Phoenix, Thai midfielder Surat Sukha from Chonburi FC, the promotion of Mathew Theodore and Matthew Foschini from the youth squad and the permanent signing of veteran Carlos Hernández from L.D. Alajuelense for three years (after his two-year loan).

Meanwhile, Mate Dugandžić was signed from Melbourne Knights, Robbie Kruse from Brisbane Roar, Marvin Angulo from Club Sport Herediano and Sutee Suksomkit was signed as a nine match guest player.

On 1 December 2009, it was announced that Ney Fabiano was leaving Melbourne and had signed a contract with Thai Premier League team Bangkok Glass FC for the 2010 season.

The Victory finished second to Sydney FC on the ladder and lost the 2010 A-League Grand Final to Sydney 4–2 on penalties.

Melbourne Victory were drawn into Group E in the 2010 AFC Champions League along with Seongnam Ilhwa Chunma, Beijing Guoan and Kawasaki Frontale. With key players Archie Thompson, Matthew Kemp and Billy Celeski sidelined for long term injuries, Victory finished bottom of Group E.

== Players ==
=== First team squad ===
Note: Flags indicate national team as defined under FIFA eligibility rules; some limited exceptions apply. Players may hold more than one non-FIFA nationality.

No.	Pos.	Nation	Player
1	GK	AUS	Mitchell Langerak
2	DF	AUS	Kevin Muscat (Captain)
3	MF	AUS	Mate Dugandžić (Youth)
5	DF	THA	Surat Sukha
6	MF	AUS	Leigh Broxham
7	DF	AUS	Matthew Kemp
8	MF	SCO	Grant Brebner
10	FW	AUS	Archie Thompson (Marquee)
11	MF	CRC	Marvin Angulo
12	DF	AUS	Rodrigo Vargas (Vice-Captain)
13	FW	AUS	Nathan Elasi (Youth)

No.	Pos.	Nation	Player
14	MF	AUS	Billy Celeski
15	MF	AUS	Tom Pondeljak
16	MF	CRC	Carlos Hernández
17	DF	AUS	Matthew Foschini (Youth)
18	MF	ENG	Chris Windsor
19	DF	AUS	Evan Berger
20	GK	NZL	Glen Moss
21	FW	AUS	Robbie Kruse
22	MF	AUS	Nick Ward
23	DF	AUS	Adrian Leijer
29	FW	AUS	Nik Mrdja (Injury replacement player)

=== Transfers ===
In

Player	From	League	Fee	Date
(New Zealand) Glen Moss	Wellington Phoenix	(Australia) A-League	Free	March 2009
(Australia) Mathew Theodore	Melbourne Victory	(Australia) A-League National Youth League	Free	April 2009
(Costa Rica) Carlos Hernández	L.D. Alajuelense	Primera División de Costa Rica	Not Disclosed	May 2009
(Thailand) Surat Sukha	Chonburi	(Thailand) Thai Premier League	$57,000	May 2009
(Australia) Matthew Foschini	Melbourne Victory	(Australia) A-League National Youth League	Free	August 2009
(Australia) Adrian Leijer	Fulham	(England) Premier League	Not Disclosed	August 2009
(Australia) Robbie Kruse	Brisbane Roar	(Australia) A-League	Not Disclosed	September 2009
(Australia) Mate Dugandzic	Melbourne Knights FC	(Australia) Victorian Premier League	Not Disclosed	September 2009
(Thailand) Sutee Suksomkit	Tampines Rovers	(Singapore) S-League	Guest Contract	September 2009

Out

Player	To	League	Fee	Date
(Australia) Steve Pantelidis	Gold Coast United	(Australia) A-League	Free	March 2009
(Australia) Michael Thwaite	Gold Coast United	(Australia) A-League	Free	March 2009
(Australia) Sebastian Ryall	Sydney FC	(Australia) A-League	Free	March 2009
(Australia) Michael Theoklitos	Norwich City	(England) Football League One	End of Contract	June 2009
(Costa Rica) José Luis López	Deportivo Saprissa	Primera División de Costa Rica	Contract Terminated	June 2009
(Australia) Daniel Vasilevski	South Melbourne FC	(Australia) Victorian Premier League	Contract Terminated	August 2009
(Australia) Daniel Allsopp	Al-Rayyan Sports Club	(Qatar) Qatari League	Not Disclosed	September 2009
(Brazil) Ney Fabiano	Bangkok Glass	(Thailand) Thai Premier League	Contract Terminated	December 2009
(Thailand) Sutee Suksomkit	Bangkok Glass	(Thailand) Thai Premier League	End of Contract	December 2009

== Matches ==
=== 2009-10 pre-season friendlies ===
12 May 2009	Melbourne Victory (Australia)	2 : 0	(Australia) Victorian Men's	Olympic Park Stadium, Melbourne
	N. Fabiano 56'; N. Elasi 68'			Attendance: 2,000

20 May 2009	Victorian Men's (Australia)	3 : 1	(Australia) Melbourne Victory	Mansion Stadium, Melbourne
			T. Pondeljak	Attendance: 1,000

27 May 2009	Melbourne Victory (Australia)	2 : 1	(Australia) Dandenong Thunder	Olympic Park Stadium, Melbourne
	D. Allsopp 30'; N. Ward

5 June 2009	Guangzhou Pharmaceutical (China)	2 : 1	(Australia) Melbourne Victory	Yuexiushan Stadium, Guangzhou
			90' L. Broxham

7 June 2009	Tianjin Teda (China)	2 : 1	(Australia) Melbourne Victory	TEDA Football Stadium, Tianjin
			47' N. Ward

16 June 2009	Melbourne Victory (Australia)	4 : 0	(Australia) Hume City	Olympic Park Stadium, Melbourne

27 June 2009	Wellington Phoenix (New Zealand)	1 : 1	(Australia) Melbourne Victory	Queenstown Events Centre, Queenstown
			55' N. Ward	Attendance: 2,000

4 July 2009	Victorian Men's (Australia)	0 : 3	(Australia) Melbourne Victory	Deakin Reserve, Shepparton
			L. Broxham; N. Elasi; P. Franjic	Attendance: 2,000

11 July 2009	Melbourne Victory (Australia)	0 : 3	(England) Fulham FC	Etihad Stadium
				Attendance: 20,666

22 July 2009	Melbourne Victory (Australia)	1 : 1	(Australia) Green Gully	Olympic Park Stadium, Melbourne
	N. Ward

26 July 2009	Adelaide United (Australia)	1 : 2	(Australia) Melbourne Victory	Aurora Stadium, Adelaide
			19' G. Brebner; 29' A. Thompson	Attendance: 6,257

=== 2009-10 Hyundai A-League fixtures ===
6 August 2009 Round 1	Melbourne Victory	0 : 2	Central Coast Mariners	Etihad Stadium, Melbourne
19:30 UTC+10		Report; Summary	Simon 10'; McGlinchey 16'	Attendance: 18,885; Referee: Matthew Breeze

15 August 2009 Round 2	Melbourne Victory	3 : 3	Brisbane Roar	Etihad Stadium, Melbourne
19:30 UTC+10	Hernández 33', 70'; Allsopp 63'	Report; Summary	Tiatto 22' van Dijk 24' (pen.); Henrique 37'	Attendance: 18,603; Referee: Strebre Delovski

22 August 2009 Round 3	North Queensland Fury	0 : 1	Melbourne Victory	Dairy Farmers Stadium, Townsville
17:00 UTC+10		Report; Summary	A. Thompson 45'	Attendance: 6,514; Referee: Peter Green

28 August 2009 Round 4	Perth Glory	2 : 1	Melbourne Victory	Members Equity Stadium, Perth
20:00 UTC+8	Jelić 5', 54'	Report; Summary	A. Thompson 9'	Attendance: 8,057; Referee: Chris Beath

3 September 2009 Round 5	Melbourne Victory	1 : 1	Newcastle Jets	Etihad Stadium, Melbourne
19:30 UTC+10	A. Thompson 42'	Report; Summary	Haliti 87'	Attendance: 15,168; Referee: Chris Beath

13 September 2009 Round 6	Melbourne Victory	1 : 1	Wellington Phoenix	Etihad Stadium, Melbourne
15:00 UTC+10	Hernández 4'	Summary	T. Brown 30'	Attendance: 17,644; Referee: Craig Zetter

18 September 2009 Round 7	Adelaide United	0 : 2	Melbourne Victory	Hindmarsh Stadium, Adelaide
19:30 UTC+9:30		Summary	Ward 7'; Brebner 90'	Attendance: 15,038; Referee: Strebre Delovski

26 September 2009 Round 8	Gold Coast United	2 : 3	Melbourne Victory	Skilled Park, Gold Coast
19:30 UTC+10	Culina 18' (pen.); Fitzsimmons (red card) 29'; Porter 45'	Report; Summary	Hernández 22'; A. Thompson 43'; K. Muscat 86' (pen.)	Attendance: 5,603; Referee: Peter Green

3 October 2009 Round 9	Melbourne Victory	2 : 1	Brisbane Roar	Etihad Stadium, Melbourne
19:30 UTC+10	Ney Fabiano 3'; Leijer 72'	Report; Summary	Reinaldo 11'	Attendance: 19,587; Referee: Strebre Delovski

9 October 2009 Round 10	Melbourne Victory	0 : 3	Sydney FC	Etihad Stadium, Melbourne
20:00 UTC+11		Summary	Brosque 14'; Bridge 16', 19'	Attendance: 30,668; Referee: Peter Green

18 October 2009 Round 11	Newcastle Jets	1 : 3	Melbourne Victory	EnergyAustralia Stadium, Newcastle
15:00 UTC+11	Haliti 22'	Report; Summary	A. Thompson 62'; Pondeljak 80'; Hernández 84'	Attendance: 6,029; Referee: Ben Williams

24 October 2009 Round 12	Melbourne Victory	3 : 1	Adelaide United	Etihad Stadium, Melbourne
18:30 UTC+11	Dugandžić 18', 56'; Leijer 89'	Report; Summary	Hughes 64'	Attendance: 21,182; Referee: Ben Williams

1 November 2009 Round 13	Perth Glory	1 : 2	Melbourne Victory	ME Bank Stadium, Perth
16:00 UTC+8	Sterjovski 19'	Report; Summary	C. Coyne 7' (o.g.); C. Windsor 87'	Attendance: 10,035; Referee: Strebre Delovski

7 November 2009 Round 14	Melbourne Victory	0 : 4	Central Coast Mariners	Etihad Stadium, Melbourne
19:00 UTC+11		Report; Summary	Kwasnik 15'; Simon 75'; Heffernan 80'; Mrdja 83'	Attendance: 18,531; Referee: Strebre Delovski

21 November 2009 Round 15	Brisbane Roar	0 : 1	Melbourne Victory	Suncorp Stadium, Brisbane
18:00 UTC+10	Henrique (red card) 85'	Summary	A. Thompson 8'	Attendance: 9,904; Referee: Ben Williams

28 November 2009 Round 16	Melbourne Victory	4 : 0	Gold Coast United	Etihad Stadium, Melbourne
19:00 UTC+11	Kruse 28'; Ward 45+1'; A. Thompson 54', 68'	Report; Summary		Attendance: 20,537; Referee: Ben Williams

4 December 2009 Round 17	Wellington Phoenix	1 : 1	Melbourne Victory	Westpac Stadium, Wellington
19:30 UTC+13	T. Brown 58'	Summary	Ward (yellow card) 40' (yellow-red card); Vargas 87'	Attendance: 8,200; Referee: Michael Hester

12 December 2009 Round 18	Central Coast Mariners	0 : 3	Melbourne Victory	Bluetongue Stadium, Gosford
19:00 UTC+11		Report; Summary	Hernández 57'; Kemp 70'; Boogaard 77' (o.g.)	Attendance: 7,571; Referee: Ryan Shepheard

19 December 2009 Round 19	Melbourne Victory	0 : 0	Sydney FC	Etihad Stadium, Melbourne
20:00 UTC+11		Report; Summary		Attendance: 27,344; Referee: Strebre Delovski

27 December 2009 Round 20	North Queensland Fury	1 : 0	Melbourne Victory	Dairy Farmers Stadium, Townsville
20:00 UTC+10	Daal 31'	Report; Summary		Attendance: 7,031; Referee: Peter Green

10 January 2010 Round 21	Newcastle Jets	3 : 2	Melbourne Victory	EnergyAustralia Stadium, Newcastle
17:00 UTC+11	Kantarovski (yellow card) 22' (yellow-red card) 34'; M. Thompson 26'; Bridges 45'; Haliti 56'	Report; Summary	K. Muscat 35' (pen.); Hernández 90+1'	Attendance: 6,979; Referee: Matthew Breeze

16 January 2010 Round 22	Melbourne Victory	6 : 2	Perth Glory	Etihad Stadium, Melbourne
19:00 UTC+11	A. Thompson 4'; Kruse 12', 26', 39'; K. Muscat 81' (pen.); Hernández 83'	Report; Summary	Vargas 23' (o.g.); Sterjovski 52'	Attendance: 20,448; Referee: Strebre Delovski

23 January 2010 Round 23	Melbourne Victory	2 : 0	Adelaide United	Etihad Stadium, Melbourne
19:00 UTC+11	Pondeljak 1'; K. Muscat 90+4' (pen.)	Report; Summary		Attendance: 20,361; Referee: Matthew Breeze

26 January 2010 Round 24	Melbourne Victory	4 : 0	Wellington Phoenix	Etihad Stadium, Melbourne
18:00 UTC+11	Brown 17' (o.g.); A. Thompson 50'; Hernández 66'; Kemp 87'	Summary		Attendance: 18,819; Referee: Chris Beath

29 January 2010 Round 25	Gold Coast United	1 : 0	Melbourne Victory	Skilled Park, Gold Coast
19:30 UTC+10	Caravella 77'	Report; Summary		Attendance: 7,249; Referee: Chris Beath

5 February 2010 Round 26	Melbourne Victory	2 : 0	North Queensland Fury	Etihad Stadium, Melbourne
20:00 UTC+11	Hernández 36', 66'	Report; Summary		Attendance: 22,726; Referee: Ben Williams

14 February 2010 Round 27	Sydney FC	2 : 0	Melbourne Victory	Sydney Football Stadium, Sydney
17:00 UTC+11	Kisel 34'; Aloisi 49'	Report; Summary		Attendance: 25,407; Referee: Matthew Breeze

=== 2009-10 finals series ===
18 February 2010 Major Semi Final Leg 1	Melbourne Victory	2 : 1	Sydney FC	Etihad Stadium, Melbourne
20:00 UTC+11	N. Mrdja 16' (red card) 73'; C. Hernández 40'	Report; Summary	42' J. Aloisi	Attendance: 18,453; Referee: Peter Green

7 March 2010 Major Semi Final Leg 2	Sydney FC	2 : 2 (a.e.t.)	Melbourne Victory	Sydney Football Stadium, Sydney
17:00 UTC+11	K. Kisel 36' (pen.); M. Bridge 54'	3-4 on aggregate Report; Summary	15' R. Kruse; 113' A. Thompson	Attendance: 23,818; Referee: Strebre Delovski

20 March 2010 Grand Final	Melbourne Victory	1 : 1 (a.e.t.)	Sydney FC	Etihad Stadium, Melbourne
19:00 UTC+11	A. Leijer 81'	(2-4 pen.); Report; Summary	63' M. Bridge	Attendance: 44,560; Referee: Strebre Delovski
	Penalties
	K. Muscat (penalty missed); G. Brebner (penalty scored); M. Angulo (penalty missed); L. Broxham (penalty scored)		(penalty scored) S. Colosimo; (penalty missed) S. Cole; (penalty scored) H. Foxe; (penalty scored) K. Kisel; (penalty scored) S. Byun

== Statistics ==
=== Goals ===
Total	Player		Goals per Round																													
Total	Player		1	2	3	4	5	6	7	8	9	10	11	12	13	14	15	16	17	18	19	20	21	22	23	24	25	26	27	SF1	SF2	GF
13	(Costa Rica)	Carlos Hernández		2				1		1			1		1					1	1			1	1			2		1		
11	(Australia)	Archie Thompson			1	1	1			1			1				1	2			1				1						1	
5	(Australia)	Robbie Kruse																1							3						1	
4	(Australia)	Kevin Muscat								1														1	1	1						
3	(Australia)	Adrian Leijer									1			1																		1
2	(Australia)	Mate Dugandžić												2																		
2	(Australia)	Nick Ward							1									1														
2	(Australia)	Tom Pondeljak											1													1						
2	(Australia)	Matthew Kemp																		1	1											
1	(Australia)	Danny Allsopp		1																												
1	(Scotland)	Grant Brebner							1																							
1	(Brazil)	Ney Fabiano									1																					
1	(Australia)	Rodrigo Vargas																	1													
1	(Australia)	Nik Mrdja																	1											1		

== Ladder ==
Pos	Team	Pld	W	D	L	GF	GA	GD	Pts	Qualification
1	Sydney FC (C)	27	15	3	9	35	23	+12	48	Qualification for 2011 AFC Champions League group stage and Finals series
2	Melbourne Victory	27	14	5	8	47	32	+15	47	Qualification for 2011 AFC Champions League group stage and Finals series
3	Gold Coast United	27	13	5	9	39	35	+4	44	Qualification for Finals series
4	Wellington Phoenix	27	10	10	7	37	29	+8	40	Qualification for Finals series
5	Perth Glory	27	11	6	10	40	34	+6	39	Qualification for Finals series
6	Newcastle Jets	27	10	4	13	33	45	−12	34	Qualification for Finals series
7	North Queensland Fury	27	8	8	11	29	46	−17	32	
8	Central Coast Mariners	27	7	9	11	32	29	+3	30	
9	Brisbane Roar	27	8	6	13	32	42	−10	30	
10	Adelaide United	27	7	8	12	24	33	−9	29	

Source: ultimatealeague.com
Rules for classification: 1) points; 2) goal difference; 3) number of goals scored.
(C) Champions

=== Finals ===
Elimination finals
3	Gold Coast United	0 (5)
6	Newcastle Jets (p.s.o.)	0 (6)
4	Wellington Phoenix (p.s.o.)	1 (4)
5	Perth Glory	1 (2)

Semifinals
1	Sydney FC	1	2
2	Melbourne Victory	2	2
Wellington Phoenix	3
Newcastle Jets	1

Preliminary final
Sydney FC	4
Wellington Phoenix	2

Grand final
Melbourne Victory	1 (2)
Sydney FC (p.s.o.)	1 (4)

== AFC Champions League ==
Round	Date	Home team	Score	Away team	Crowd	Stadium
Group Stage	23 February 2010	Beijing Guoan	1-0	Melbourne Victory	31,000	Workers Stadium
Group Stage	9 March 2010	Melbourne Victory	0-2	Seongnam Ilhwa Chunma	7,899	Etihad Stadium
Group Stage	23 March 2010	Kawasaki Frontale	4-0	Melbourne Victory	9,728	Todoroki Athletics Stadium
Group Stage	31 March 2010	Melbourne Victory	1-0	Kawasaki Frontale	6,011	Etihad Stadium
Group Stage	14 April 2010	Melbourne Victory	0-0	Beijing Guoan	6,394	Etihad Stadium
Group Stage	28 April 2010	Seongnam Ilhwa Chunma	3-2	Melbourne Victory	502	Tancheon Sports Complex

23 February 2010
19:30 (UTC+8)

Beijing Guoan (China)	1 – 0	(Australia) Melbourne Victory
J. Griffiths 52'	Report

Workers Stadium, Beijing
Attendance: 31,000
Referee: Ali Hamad Al-Badwawi (UAE)

9 March 2010
19:30 (UTC+11)

Melbourne Victory (Australia)	0 – 2	(South Korea) Seongnam Ilhwa Chunma
	Report	Ognenovski 40'; Yun Young-Sun 85'

Etihad Stadium, Melbourne
Attendance: 7,899
Referee: Nawaf Abdulla (Bahrain)

23 March 2010
19:00 (UTC+9)

Kawasaki Frontale (Japan)	4 – 0	(Australia) Melbourne Victory
Chong Tese 3'; Kurotsu 11'; Renatinho 22'; Taniguchi 90'	Report

Todoroki Athletics Stadium, Kawasaki
Attendance: 9,728
Referee: Khalil Ibrahim M. Al-Ghamdi (Saudi Arabia)

31 March 2010
19:30 (UTC+11)

Melbourne Victory (Australia)	1 – 0	(Japan) Kawasaki Frontale
Muscat 60' (pen.)	Report

Etihad Stadium, Melbourne
Attendance: 6,011
Referee: Saeid Mozaffarizadeh (Iran)

14 April 2010
19:30 (UTC+10)

Melbourne Victory (Australia)	0 – 0	(China) Beijing Guoan
	Report

Etihad Stadium, Melbourne
Attendance: 6,394
Referee: Abdul Malik Bashir (Singapore)

28 April 2010
19:00 (UTC+9)

Seongnam Ilhwa Chunma (South Korea)	3 – 2	(Australia) Melbourne Victory
Jeon Kwang-Jin 27'; Namgung Do 72'; Jo Jae-Cheol 83'	Report	Dugandžić 46'; Pondeljak 77'

Tancheon Sports Complex, Seongnam
Attendance: 502
Referee: Mohamed Abdelkarim Mohamed Ismail Al-Zarouni (UAE)

Pos	Team	Pld	W	D	L	GF	GA	GD	Pts	Qualification
1	(South Korea) Seongnam Ilhwa Chunma	6	5	0	1	11	6	+5	15	Advance to knockout stage
2	(China) Beijing Guoan	6	3	1	2	7	5	+2	10	Advance to knockout stage
3	(Japan) Kawasaki Frontale	6	2	0	4	8	8	0	6	
4	(Australia) Melbourne Victory	6	1	1	4	3	10	−7	4	

Source: AFC Champions League Official Page

== W-League ==
=== 2009-10 Westfield W-League fixtures ===
Round 1

3 October 2009
16:45 UTC+10

Melbourne Victory	2 – 0	Perth Glory
Enza Barilla 34'; Katie Thorlakson 71'; Selin Kuralay (yellow card) 79' (yellow-red card) 90'	Report

Etihad Stadium

Round 2

10 October 2009
18:00 UTC+10

Melbourne Victory	0 – 1	Brisbane Roar
	Report	Ellen Beaumont 84'

Epping Soccer Stadium

Round 3

17 October 2009
14:30 UTC+10:30

Adelaide United	0 – 2	Melbourne Victory
	Report	Katrina Gorry 29'; Selin Kuralay 81'

Hindmarsh Stadium

Round 4

24 October 2009
14:30 UTC+10:30

Canberra United	2 – 0	Melbourne Victory
Tseng Shu-o 27', 49'	Report

McKellar Park, A.C.T.

Round 5

31 October 2009
14:00 UTC+11

Melbourne Victory	2 – 1	Newcastle Jets
Katrina Gorry 45'; Deanna Niceski 91'	Report	Renee Cartwright 62'

Veneto Club

Round 6

7 November 2009
19:00 UTC+11

Melbourne Victory	1 – 1	Sydney FC
Julianne Sitch 62'	Report	Maika Ruyter-Hooley 90+5' (o.g.)

Deakin Reserve, Shepparton

Round 7

14 November 2009
19:00 UTC+11

Brisbane Roar	1 – 1	Melbourne Victory
Clare Polkinghorne 49'	Report	Kara Mowbray 88'

Ballymore Stadium

Round 8

21 November 2009
17:45 UTC+11

Central Coast Mariners	2 – 0	Melbourne Victory
Michelle Heyman 27', 52'	Report

Leichhardt Oval

Round 9

28 November 2009
15:00 UTC+11

Melbourne Victory	1 – 0	Canberra United
Katie Thorlakson 87'	Report

Olympic Park

Round 10

5 December 2009
18:00 UTC+11

Perth Glory	2 – 0	Melbourne Victory
Lisa De Vanna 81'; Katie Gill 87'	Report

Clipsal Stadium, Ingelwood

=== 2009-10 W-League fixtures ===
Round	Date	Home team	Score	Away team	Stadium
1	3 October 2009	Melbourne Victory	2-0	Perth Glory FC	Etihad Stadium
2	10 October 2009	Melbourne Victory	0-1	Brisbane Roar	Epping Stadium
3	17 October 2009	Adelaide United	0-2	Melbourne Victory	Hindmarsh Stadium
4	24 October 2009	Canberra United	2-0	Melbourne Victory	McKellar Park, A.C.T.
5	31 October 2009	Melbourne Victory	2 - 1	Newcastle Jets	Veneto Club
6	7 November 2009	Melbourne Victory	1 - 1	Sydney FC	Deakin Reserve, Shepparton
7	14 November 2009	Brisbane Roar	1 - 1	Melbourne Victory	Ballymore Stadium
8	21 November 2009	Central Coast Mariners	2 - 0	Melbourne Victory	Leichhardt Oval
9	28 November 2009	Melbourne Victory	1 - 0	Canberra United	Bob Jane Stadium
10	5 December 2008	Perth Glory FC	2 - 0	Melbourne Victory	Clipsal Stadium, Ingelwood

Preceded by Central Coast Mariners	A-League Premiers; 2008–09	Succeeded by Sydney FC
Preceded by Newcastle Jets	A-League Champions; 2008–09	Succeeded by Incumbent
