= Matthew Kemp (soccer) =

Australian soccer player

Personal information
- Full name: Matthew Allan Kemp
- Date of birth: 8 August 1980 (age 46)
- Place of birth: Canberra, Australia
- Height: 1.75 m (5 ft 9 in)
- Position: Wing back

Youth career
- Belnorth
- 1998–1999: AIS

Senior career*
Years	Team	Apps	(Gls)
1999–2000	Adelaide City	31	(6)
2000	→ Croydon Kings (loan)	3	(0)
2000–2001	SPAL	13	(0)
2001–2003	Adelaide City	41	(1)
2003–2007	Adelaide United	42	(2)
2004	→ Adelaide Blue Eagles (loan)	15	(2)
2007–2012	Melbourne Victory	79	(2)
2012–2014	West Adelaide	47	(9)
2018	Adelaide Raiders	6	(0)
2020	Eastern United	11	(2)
Total		288	(22)

International career^{‡}
2010	Australia	1	(0)
- * Club domestic league appearances and goals as of 11 December 2020 ‡ National team caps and goals as of 17:30, 12 November 2010 (UTC)

Matthew Allan Kemp (born 8 August 1980) is a former Australian footballer who last played for Eastern United. Kemp announced his retirement from the A-League in May 2012. He made 79 appearances for Melbourne Victory, his last being against Greek giants Olympiacos.

== Club career ==
Kemp was signed by the AIS in 1998 but transferred the next season to Adelaide City who were then part of the now defunct NSL. After playing a season there he was signed by Italian side SPAL 1907. The next season, he moved back to Australia where he returned to play for Adelaide City, before being signed by Adelaide United. He played for Adelaide in the A-League's first two seasons. It was announced on 11 April 2007 that he had signed a two-year contract with Melbourne Victory.

During his first season Kemp was much-maligned by the supporters, but soon proved his worth as a valuable defender. He was the Victory's standout player during their 2008 Asian Champions League campaign where he benefited from his experience the year before in the same competition with Adelaide. During the 09/10 Season Kemp has proved his worth to the Victory in attack as well as defence playing in wide and sometimes central midfield. He scored his first goal for the club in a match against the Central Coast Mariners in early 2010 and followed up with a goal coming off the bench against Wellington on Australia Day a few weeks later.

In the match against North Queensland Fury at Etihad Stadium on 5 February 2010, Kemp badly injured his knee when his leg buckled while challenging for the ball. Despite a valiant attempt to continue playing, Kemp succumbed to the pain and was stretchered off.

Matthew Kemp had announced his retirement from the A-League on 21 May 2012, aged just 31, stating that injuries were not a factor in his decision.

"I’d like to thank the club for those opportunities and wish them all the best in the future", Kemp said.

He said that he could have continued playing, but his decision was more based on the future. He felt it was time to look ahead and retrain in areas that would provide future professional opportunities and give him a chance to spend more time with his family. He also ruled out returning to his hometown of Canberra, choosing instead to play at West Adelaide SC and was the best player on the team with 132 goals.

== International career ==
Kemp got his first senior international cap for the Socceroos on 7 January 2010 in an AFC Asian Cup qualifying match versus Kuwait at the Al Kuwait Sports Club Stadium in Kuwait City.

== Honours ==
With Melbourne Victory:

- (Australia) A-League Championship: 2008–2009
- (Australia) A-League Premiership: 2008–2009

With Adelaide United:

- (Australia) A-League Premiership: 2005–2006

Personal honours:

- Melbourne Victory Clubman of the Year: 2009–2010
