= Milson (footballer, born 1977) =

Brazilian footballer (born 1977)

Personal information
- Full name: Milson Ferreira dos Santos
- Date of birth: November 24, 1977 (age 48)
- Place of birth: Cuiabá, Mato Grosso, Brazil
- Height: 1.85 m (6 ft 1 in)
- Position: Striker

Senior career*
Years	Team	Apps	(Gls)
1998–2001	Botafogo	0	(0)
1999–2000	→ Al-Nasr (loan)	20	(6)
2000	→ Sichuan Quanxing (loan)	24	(7)
2001	Tianjin Teda	9	(1)
2001–2003	Chengdu Blades	61	(29)
2003–2004	Germinal Beerschot	5	(1)
2004–2008	Tombense-MG	7	(3)
2004	→ Jiangsu Sainty (loan)	31	(9)
2005	→ Olaria (loan)	0	(0)
2006	→ Chengdu Blades (loan)	8	(1)
2007	→ Shenzhen Xiangxue Eisiti (loan)	3	(1)
2008	→ Madureira (loan)	0	(0)
2009–2010	Gold Coast United	9	(0)
- * Club domestic league appearances and goals as of 24 May 2009

Milson Ferreira Dos Santos (born November 24, 1977, in Cuiabá, Brazil), known as just Milson, is a Brazilian former footballer.

== Club career ==
=== Gold Coast United FC ===
On December 15, 2008, Milson was signed by Gold Coast United as their third Brazilian, along with Robson and Jefferson. On January 14, 2010, Gold Coast United issued an early termination to Milson's contract in the best interests of both the player and club.
