= Anderson Alves =

Brazilian footballer (born 1983)

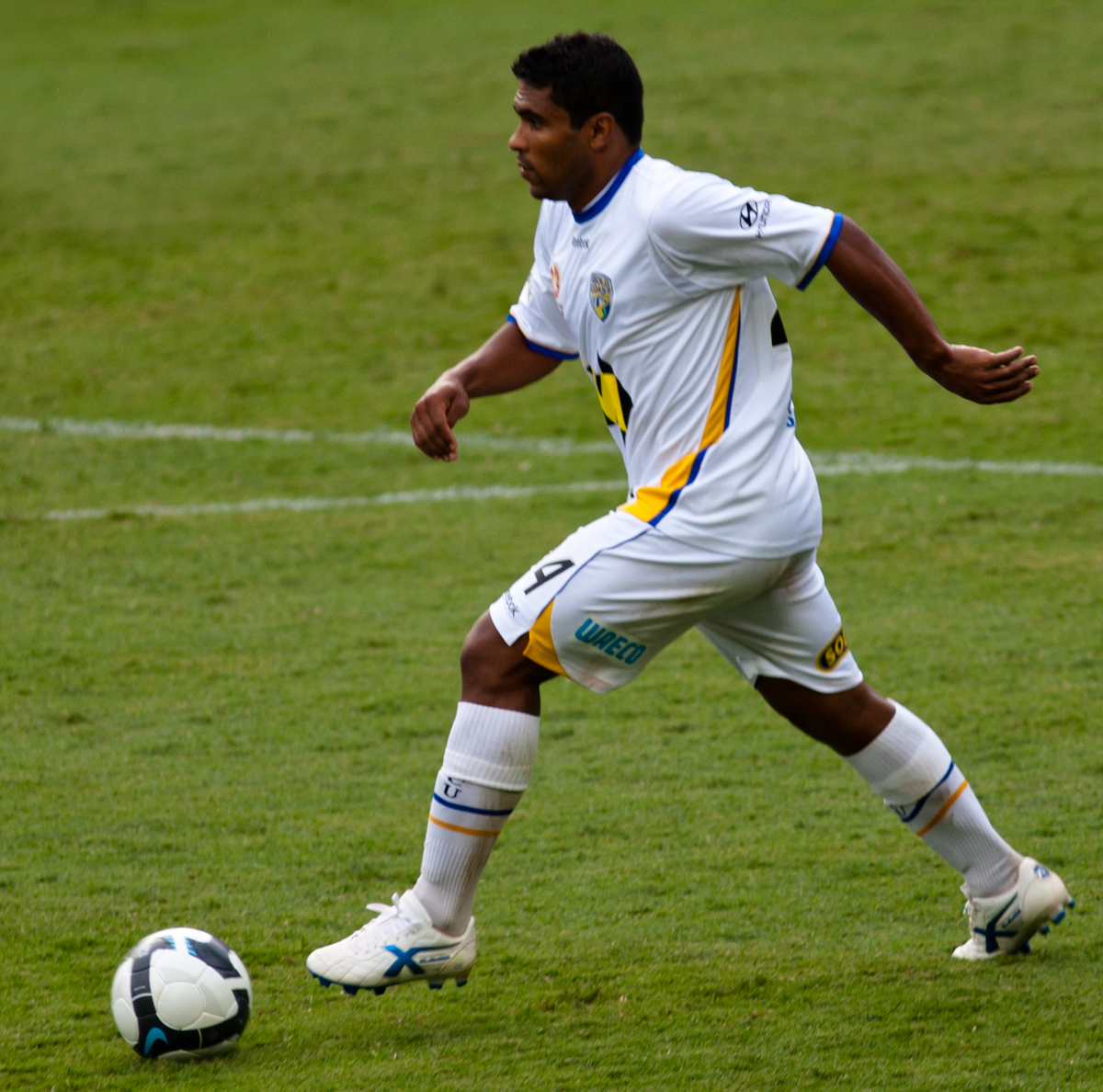

Personal information
- Full name: Anderson Alves da Silva
- Date of birth: 10 January 1983 (age 43)
- Place of birth: Rio de Janeiro, Brazil
- Height: 1.70 m (5 ft 7 in)
- Position: Left back

Youth career
- Flamengo

Senior career*
Years	Team	Apps	(Gls)
2001–2007	Flamengo	6	(0)
2004–2005	→ Caxias (loan)	34	(2)
2005–2006	→ União de Leiria (loan)	2	(0)
2006–2007	→ CD Fátima (loan)	27	(2)
2007	Adap Galo	10	(0)
2007	Rio Branco	12	(1)
2008–2010	Criciuma	45	(5)
2009–2010	→ Gold Coast United (loan)	27	(0)
2010–2011	Gold Coast United	22	(0)
2012–2013	Enosis Neon Paralimni	18	(1)
2014	São João da Barra		
2015	São Cristóvão		

International career
1998–1999	Brazil U-17	8	(0)
2001	Brazil U-20	2	(0)
- * Club domestic league appearances and goals

Anderson Alves da Silva (born 10 January 1983), sometimes known as just Anderson, is a Brazilian former footballer.

== Club career ==
On 22 June 2009, it was announced that he would be signed by Gold Coast United as a short-term injury replacement for fellow Brazilian Jefferson. At the conclusion of the 2009–10 season Miron Bleiberg offered him a 1-year contract which he accepted. He was released by the club at the end of the 2010–11 A-League.

== Personal life ==
He is the older brother of Robson who also plays for Cypriot club Ayia Napa.
