= Michael Thwaite =

Australian professional soccer player

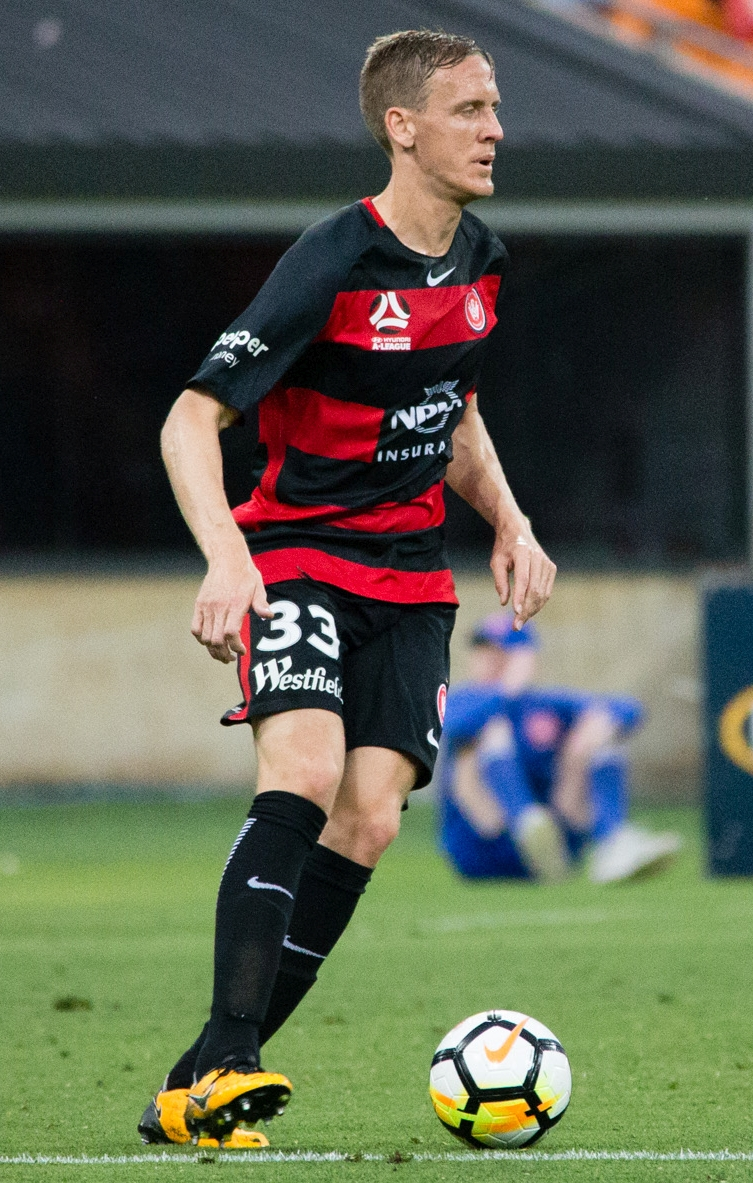
- Thwaite playing for Western Sydney Wanderers FC in 2018

Personal information
- Full name: Michael Errol Thwaite
- Date of birth: 2 May 1983 (age 43)
- Place of birth: Brisbane, Australia
- Height: 1.90 m (6 ft 3 in)
- Positions: Centre back; defensive midfielder

Senior career*
Years	Team	Apps	(Gls)
2002	Sydney University	22	(5)
2002–2004	Marconi Stallions	34	(0)
2004–2006	Naţional București	36	(0)
2006–2008	Wisła Kraków	6	(0)
2008–2009	SK Brann	2	(0)
2008–2009	→ Melbourne Victory (loan)	16	(0)
2009–2012	Gold Coast United	82	(1)
2012–2016	Perth Glory	85	(2)
2016	Liaoning Whowin	25	(3)
2017–2018	Western Sydney Wanderers	21	(1)
2019–2020	Gold Coast United	45	(4)
Total		374	(16)

International career
2002–2003	Australia U20	8	(0)
2004	Australia U23	3	(1)
2005–2013	Australia	13	(0)
- * Club domestic league appearances and goals

Michael Errol Thwaite (born 2 May 1983) is an Australian former professional soccer player.

== Education ==
He has a Bachelor of Human Movement Science degree from CQUniversity Australia. Michael also is a certified AFC B-Licence coach.

== Club career ==
Michael was raised in Cairns and played all his junior football at Saints Soccer Club. His amateur senior career began at merged club Edge Hill-Saints before moving south to Sydney University in the New South Wales Winter Super League on a Warwick Segal university scholarship. He then spent two seasons playing professionally for Marconi Stallions (2002–2004) in the now defunct NSL, before heading to Romania. He was then signed to Wisła Kraków on a Bosman transfer from FC Naţional București in Romania's Divizia A.

On 28 January 2008 he signed for SK Brann and was loaned to the Melbourne Victory on 19 June 2008. On 26 July 2008 he scored his first goal for the Victory in a pre-season cup game against Perth Glory, to guide the Victory to a 1–0 win in Perth.

On 5 January 2009 he was signed from Melbourne by Gold Coast United after successfully negotiating his transfer from Brann.

On 1 February 2012 he scored his first goal in his professional career for Gold Coast United against his former club Melbourne Victory at Aurora Stadium in Tasmania. The game finished 1–1.

Michael played for Perth Glory for the 2012–2013 A-League season onwards after Gold Coast United folded at the end of the 2011–12 A-League season and was selected as part of the PFA team of the year. He also featured in the All Stars match verses Juventus after the 2013–14 A-League. He played every single minute of the 2014–15 A-League season.

Following Perth Glory's salary cap scandal of the 2014–15 A-League season, it is understood his days at the club were numbered and in mid-January Thwaite joined Chinese club Liaoning Whowin.

During Michael's first season in the 2016 Chinese Super League Thwaite made 25 appearances scoring 3 goals.

Following changes to the Chinese Super League's foreign allowance and Liaoning Whowin signing Australians Robbie Kruse and James Holland, Thwaite was released along with his Australian teammate Dario Vidošić in February 2017.

Thwaite signed for Western Sydney Wanderers for the 2017–18 A-League season, scoring 1 goal and reaching 200 A-League games during the Sydney Derby on 25 February 2018. At the conclusion of the season, Michael returned home to his family on the Gold Coast.

In 2019 Michael will play for Gold Coast United in the Queensland National Premier League. On 8 June 2019 Thwaite played his 100th competitive game for Gold Coast United scoring in the 52nd minute against South West Queensland.

On 23 March 2021 Thwaite announced his retirement from professional football 19 years after making his professional debut. Gold Coast United thanked and paid tribute to Thwaite by releasing the following statement: "On behalf of everyone here at Gold Coast United FC and from across football near and far, thanks Michael and congratulations on your contribution to the game. Thwaitey's football journey took off when he moved from Cairns to Sydney as a teenager in 2002 for University. Fittingly his last 'competitive' match was leading his beloved Queensland on to Perry Park in the NPL 'State of Origin' match late 2020, a proud moment, one of many. In between times, across those 18 years, some blood, plenty of sweat and a few tears shed in an impressive playing career that criss-crossed the globe and country. Michael competed with distinction in the NSL, overseas, in the A-League, for our National teams and in the NPL. His commitment and dedication to the game and his professionalism and approach have always been exemplary. 'Bravo Thwaitey' well played! We've been privileged to have you at the club and we wish you, Chantelle and the girls all the very best.".

== International career ==
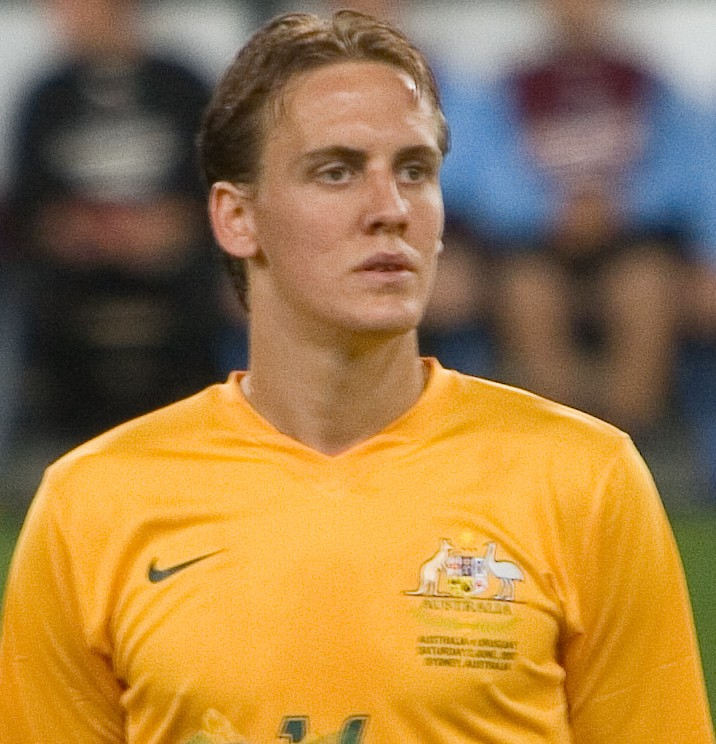
Thwaite lining up for Australia

Thwaite was part of the Australian under-20s team in the 2003 FIFA World Youth Championship in the UAE. He was also involved with the 2004 Olympics qualifying team, but did not make the final squad for the tournament proper. He made his international debut on 9 October 2005 in a 5–0 win in a friendly match held in London against Jamaica. He was a squad member of the Australian national team in their historic World Cup qualifying tie against Uruguay, but did not play, as head coach Guus Hiddink preferred the more experienced Tony Popovic and Tony Vidmar in the starting lineup. Michael was selected for the Socceroos at the 2007 Asian Cup reaching the Quarter Final against Japan in Hanoi, Vietnam. Thwaite was also a member of the Australian national team that qualified for the 2014 World Cup.

== Honours ==
Wisła Kraków

- Ekstraklasa: 2007–08

Melbourne Victory

- A-League Men Premiership: 2008–2009
- A-League Pre-Season Challenge Cup: 2008

Individual

- Gold Coast United Player of the Year: 2010–2011
- Gold Coast United Player's Player of the Year: 2009–2010
- Gold Coast United Member's Player of the Year: 2009–2010
- Perth Glory Most Glorious Player: 2013–14 Perth Glory FC season
- Perth Glory Member's Ultimate XI 1996–2016
- A-League All Stars Game participant: 2014
- Gold Coast United Player of the Year: Queensland NPL season 2019
- Queensland NPL All Stars and Queensland State team: 2020
