= Jason Culina =

Australian soccer player and coach (born 1980)

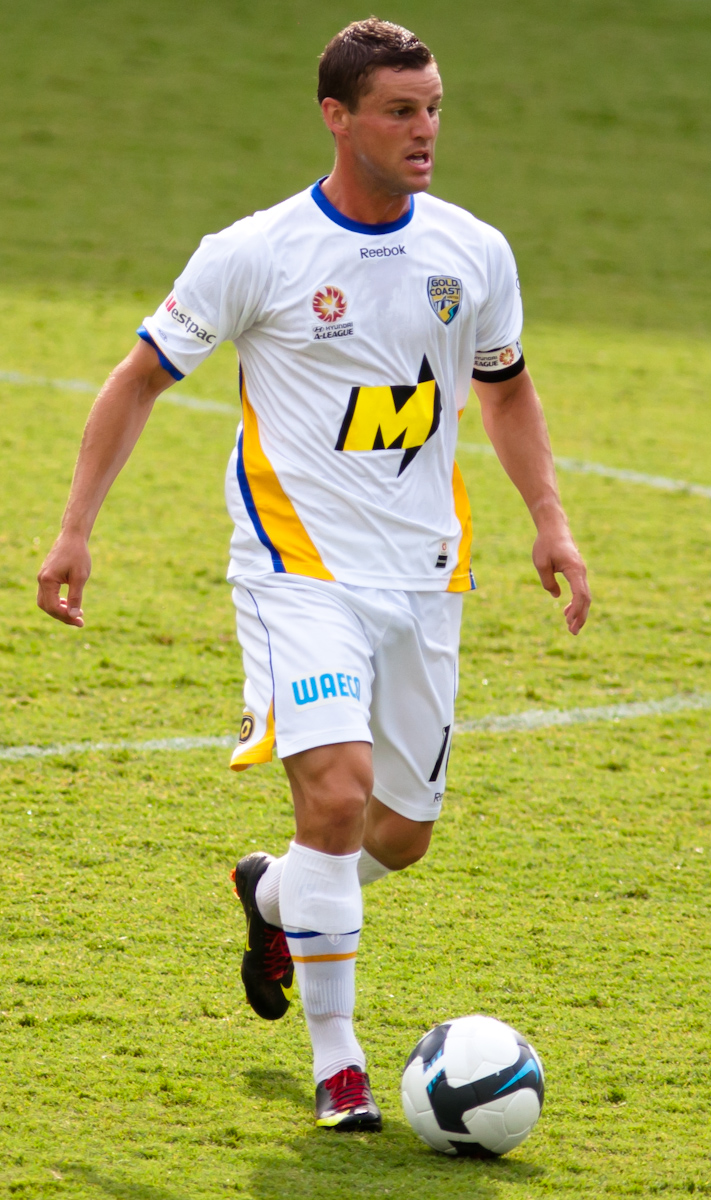
- Culina in 2010

Personal information
- Full name: Jason Culina
- Date of birth: 5 August 1980 (age 46)
- Place of birth: Melbourne, Victoria, Australia
- Height: 5 ft 9 in (1.75 m)
- Position: Midfielder

Youth career
- St Albans
- Melbourne Knights
- 1994–1996: Sydney United

Senior career*
Years	Team	Apps	(Gls)
1996–1998	Sydney United	32	(1)
1998–1999	Sydney Olympic	21	(1)
2000–2004	Ajax	3	(0)
2001	→ Germinal Beerschot (loan)	12	(1)
2002–2003	→ De Graafschap (loan)	24	(1)
2004–2005	Twente	38	(12)
2005–2009	PSV	98	(3)
2009–2011	Gold Coast United	44	(8)
2011	Newcastle Jets	0	(0)
2012–2013	Sydney FC	8	(2)
Total		280	(29)

International career
1996–1997	Australia U17	5	(6)
1999	Australia U20	4	(1)
1998–2000	Australia U23	16	(1)
2005–2011	Australia	58	(1)

Managerial career
- 2017: Fraser Park
- 2018: Sydney United 58
Medal record
Men's football
Representing Australia
AFC Asian Cup
Runner-up	2011 Qatar
- * Club domestic league appearances and goals

Jason Culina (born 5 August 1980) is an Australian soccer coach and former player. He played in two FIFA World Cup and AFC Asian Cup tournaments for the Australia national team. At club level, Culina had a nine-year spell in the Netherlands, winning four Eredivisie titles (one with Ajax and three with PSV).

== Club career ==
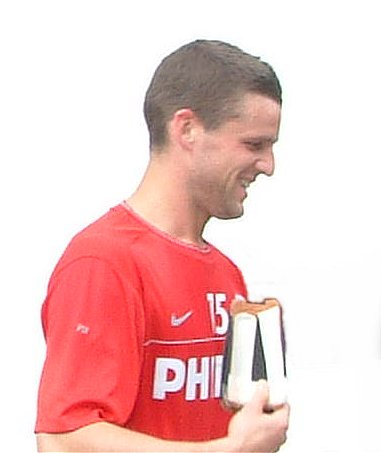
Culina at a training session with PSV

Culina began his career with Sydney United under his father, Branko Culina, before moving to Ajax, where he struggled in the reserves. Only after moving to Twente did Culina begin to shine at the top level in club football. This was proved by his moving to another top Dutch club, PSV. While originally an attack-minded midfielder with Twente, at PSV Culina played more in a disciplined defensive role for the club with immediate success. In his final year at PSV, Culina was mainly deployed at right-back with further success, attributing to Culina's versatility and utility value.

On 9 January 2009, Culina announced his intention to return to Australia after turning down a contract extension from PSV as he sought a new challenge and a fresh start in Australia.

"I want to make a fresh start and I am ready for a new challenge. I am the first international who returns to Australia and I am keen to promote the national competition and raise the standard."

On 14 January 2009, he was signed by Gold Coast United on a three-year contract, becoming the club's first marquee player. On 1 July 2009, he made his Gold Coast debut in a friendly in Singapore against a Singapore Olympic Selection, coming on as a substitute for Steve Pantelidis and scoring in the 88th minute from 25 yards out. On 22 February 2011, it was revealed Culina would join his father Branko Culina at Newcastle Jets. Culina was injured long-term and missed the 2011–12 season. His contract was set aside, but he continued his rehab and training with the club.

On 12 October 2012, Culina signed with A-League club Sydney FC. However, he lasted less than a year with the club, parting ways with the club in February 2013 after a disagreement with manager Frank Farina. Culina announced his retirement on 18 June 2013 at a Football Federation Australia function.

== Coaching career ==
In 2015, Culina joined the King's School football coaching staff, helping with the school's first team. In 2016, Culina moved to St Joseph's College, and was the college's technical director of football and coach of the First XI.

In 2017, Jason became head coach of NSW League Two side Fraser Park, alongside his father Branko and brother Dean.

On 16 August 2017, Culina was appointed head coach of Sydney United 58 after Mark Rudan resigned Culina announced his resignation from the role eight games into the season, with four wins and four losses to his side's name.

Culina is now coach of Sydney United 58 FC under 12's.

On 10 August 2023, Culina joined Western Sydney Wanderers as their Head of Academy Coaches.

== International career ==
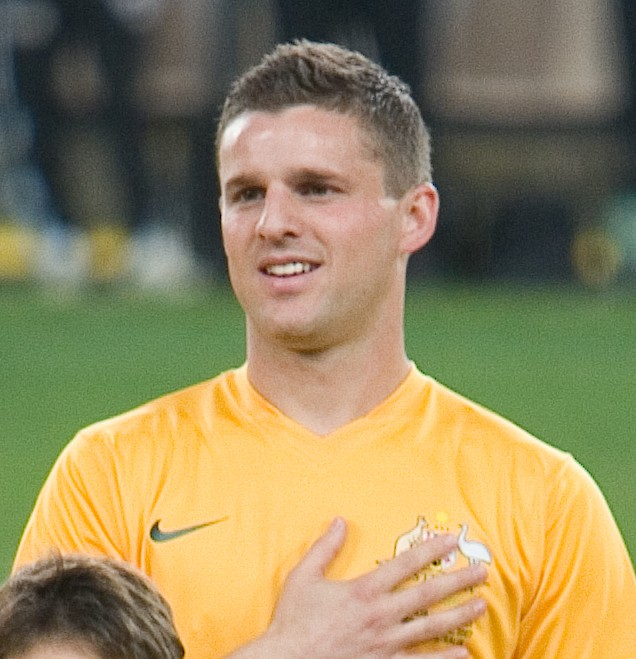
Culina playing for the Socceroos

Culina made his debut for the Australia national team against South Africa in 2005. He became a regular starter for the Socceroos under head coach Guus Hiddink, who was also his club coach at PSV. His first international goal came in September 2005, against the Solomon Islands in Sydney. Culina played in both legs of the World Cup play-off against Uruguay where Australia qualified for the 2006 World Cup following a dramatic penalty shoot-out. He was selected in the Australian squad for the World Cup, held in Germany, and started all four of Australia's matches.

On 3 March 2010, Culina was named captain of Australia for the first time, in an AFC Asian Cup qualifier against Indonesia, a 1–0 victory. On 18 June 2013, he announced his official international retirement at a function held before Australia's World Cup qualifier against Iraq.

== Personal life ==
Culina is the youngest son of former Sydney FC and Newcastle Jets coach Branko Culina. He is of Croatian descent.

He grew up in Melbourne’s western suburbs, before relocating to Sydney with his family as a teenager. He completed his schooling at Westfields Sports High School.

On 5 February 2007, Culina and his wife Terri welcomed their first child, a boy named Roman. His son Roman, is also a footballer, who currently plays for the St George City in the NPL NSW.

== Career statistics ==
=== Club ===
Appearances and goals by club, season and competition
Club	Season	League		Cup		Continental		Total	
Club	Season	Apps	Goals	Apps	Goals	Apps	Goals	Apps	Goals
Sydney United	1996–97	6	0	–		–		6	0
Sydney United	1997–98	26	1	–		–		26	1
Sydney United	Total	32	1	0	0	0	0	32	1
Sydney Olympic	1998–99	20	1	–		–		20	1
Ajax	1999–00	0	0	0	0	0	0	4	0
Ajax	2001–02	0	0	4	0	0	0	4	0
Ajax	2003–04	3	0	2	0	2	0	7	0
Ajax	Total	3	0	6	0	2	0	11	0
Germinal Beerschot (loan)	2000–01	12	1	4	2	–		16	3
De Graafschap (loan)	2002–03	24	1	4	2	–		28	3
Twente	2004–05	32	11	2	0	–		34	11
Twente	2005–06	6	1	0	0	–		6	1
Twente	Total	38	12	2	0	0	0	40	12
PSV	2005–06	23	0	4	2	2	0	29	2
PSV	2006–07	28	1	5	1	8	0	41	2
PSV	2007–08	18	1	3	0	4	0	25	1
PSV	2008–09	29	1	4	0	6	0	39	1
PSV	Total	98	3	16	3	20	0	134	6
Gold Coast United	2009–10	26	3	–		0	0	26	3
Gold Coast United	2010–11	18	5	–		0	0	18	5
Gold Coast United	Total	44	8	0	0	0	0	44	8
Newcastle Jets	2011–12	0	0	–		0	0	0	0
Sydney FC	2012–13	8	2	–		0	0	8	2
Career total		279	29	32	7	22	0	333	36

=== International ===
Appearances and goals by national team and year
National team	Year	Apps	Goals
Australia	2005	11	1
Australia	2006	9	0
Australia	2007	7	0
Australia	2008	9	0
Australia	2009	9	0
Australia	2010	11	0
Australia	2011	2	0
Total		58	1

Score and result list Australia's goal tally first, score column indicates score after Culina goal.

International goals scored by Jason Culina
No.	Date	Venue	Opponent	Score	Result	Competition
1	3 September 2005	Sydney Football Stadium, Sydney, Australia	Solomon Islands	1–0	7–0	2006 FIFA World Cup qualification

== Honours ==
Ajax

- Eredivisie: 2003–04
- KNVB Cup: 2001–02

PSV

- Eredivisie: 2005–06, 2006–07, 2007–08
- Russian Railways Cup: 2007
- Johan Cruyff Shield: 2008

Australia

- AFC Asian Cup: runner-up 2011

Individual

- Gold Coast United Player of the Year: 2009–10
