= Scott Higgins =

Australian soccer player

- Born: Scott Higgins; 9 June 1976 (age 50); Cairns, Queensland, Australia
- Height: 2.01 m (6 ft 7 in)
Association football career
- Position: Goalkeeper
Youth career
- 1991–1993: QAS
Senior career*
Years	Team	Apps	(Gls)
2001–2002	Canberra Cosmos	0	(0)
2002–2004	Brisbane Strikers	67	(0)
2005–2006	Brisbane Roar	27	(0)
2006–2007	Falkirk	23	(0)
2007	Maccabi Herzliya	19	(0)
2007–2008	Adelaide United	6	(0)
2008	Wellington Phoenix	4	
2009–2012	Gold Coast United	36	(0)
Total		182	(0)
Managerial career
- 2012–2014: Gold Coast United (goalkeeping coach)
- 2015-2017 Brisbane Roar Football Club (Football Department Manager)
- * Club domestic league appearances and goals

Scott Higgins (born 9 June 1976) is an Australian former soccer player who played as a goalkeeper. His career saw him play in three different continents, Australia, Europe, and the Middle East. The first Australian to play on three different continents professionally.

== Football career ==
=== Club career ===
He started his professional footballing career in the NSL with Canberra Cosmos and later returning to Queensland with Brisbane Strikers.

In the relaunched A-League, he secured a deal with Queensland Roar in 2005, before moving to Europe in June 2006 to join Scottish Premier League club Falkirk. A difference of opinion with Falkirk boss John Hughes ended his stay in Scotland with the "Bairns" in a good position at sixth in the SPL and through to the semi-finals of the League Cup. Before departing Scotland Higgins stated it was a boyhood dream to play against his much loved Glasgow Celtic at Parkhead on 23 December 2006. Higgins played a key role at keeping Celtic at bay and was a standout for the Bairns, saying after the game "no one can take that away from me, I loved every minute of it and knowing my family was here and my best mate Barry who is a mad hoops fan was sitting watching back in Australia makes me very proud"; however, they eventually went down one–nil. He departed Scotland on 24 January 2007 to join Israeli side Maccabi Herzliya.

=== Herzliya ===
When Higgins joined Herzliya, he became the first Australian in Israeli football. With some stellar performances he led his club to the Toto Cup final, a first ever for the club, where they defeated Hapoel Kfar Saba 2–1 at the Ramat Gan Stadium in Tel Aviv District.

Unfortunately, despite helping Herzliya to lift the Toto Cup and avoid relegation from the Israeli Premier League, Higgins left the club in late May 2007 as the club moved to secure the Macedonian national team keeper, Jane Nikolovski, as a replacement in a deal that ultimately fell through.

=== A-League ===
On returning to Australia, he was signed by Adelaide United on a short-term contract as cover for injured goalkeeper Daniel Beltrame for the start of the 2007–08 season.

In December 2008, Higgins signed a four-game contract with the Wellington Phoenix as cover for Mark Paston. He has not yet made an appearance for the Phoenix. He was released halfway through his contract, as Paston became match-fit earlier than expected. He never got any game time with the Phoenix.

Miron Bleiberg, football director of new A-League club Gold Coast United has announced that Higgins will be signed by the club for the 2009–10 season. On 30 September 2008, he was announced along with goalkeeper Jess Vanstrattan as Gold Coast United's inaugural signings.

=== Coaching ===
At the conclusion of the 2010–11 A-League season Higgins retired and joined the staff at GCU as goalkeeping coach.

== Politics ==
Higgins was an unsuccessful candidate for the 2013 federal election in the Australian Senate representing Queensland for the Palmer United Party.
