= Robbie Kruse =

Australian footballer (born 1988)

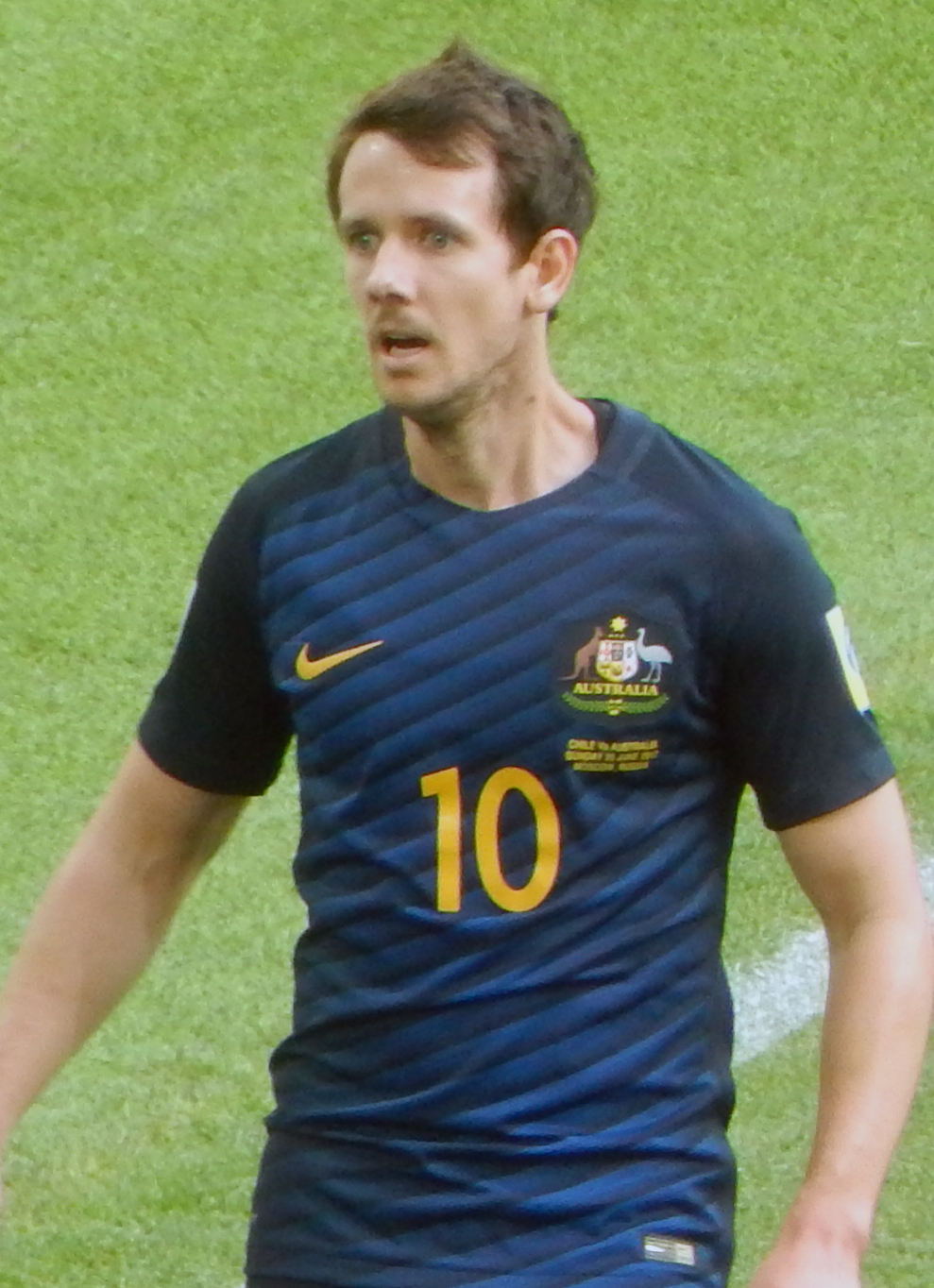
- Kruse playing for Australia at the 2017 FIFA Confederations Cup

Personal information
- Full name: Robbie Thomas Kruse
- Date of birth: 5 October 1988 (age 38)
- Place of birth: Brisbane, Queensland, Australia
- Height: 1.79 m (5 ft 10 in)
- Positions: Forward; winger; attacking midfielder

Youth career
- 2004–2005: QAS
- 2005–2006: AIS

Senior career*
| Years | Team | Apps | (Gls) |
| 2007–2009 | Brisbane Roar | 26 | (4) |
| 2009–2011 | Melbourne Victory | 39 | (16) |
| 2011–2013 | Fortuna Düsseldorf | 41 | (4) |
| 2012 | → Fortuna Düsseldorf II | 2 | (0) |
| 2013–2017 | Bayer Leverkusen | 21 | (2) |
| 2015–2016 | → VfB Stuttgart (loan) | 3 | (0) |
| 2017 | Liaoning Whowin | 4 | (0) |
| 2017–2019 | VfL Bochum | 42 | (8) |
| 2019–2022 | Melbourne Victory | 40 | (3) |
| 2023 | Brisbane Roar | 1 | (0) |
| Total | | 219 | (37) |

International career^{‡}
| 2004–2005 | Australia U17 | 11 | (3) |
| 2006 | Australia U20 | 5 | (0) |
| 2011–2019 | Australia | 75 | (5) |
Medal record
Representing Australia
AFC Asian Cup
| Winner | 2015 Australia |
| Runner-up | 2011 Qatar |
- * Club domestic league appearances and goals as of 06:09, 7 May 2023 (UTC) ‡ National team caps and goals as of 25 January 2019

Robbie Thomas Kruse (/ˈkruːs/ KROOSS; German: [ˈkʁuːzə]; born 5 October 1988) is an Australian former professional soccer player who played as a forward. He played his junior soccer with Pine Rivers SC in the Moreton Bay region of northern Brisbane and began his professional career with A-League side Brisbane Roar and later Melbourne Victory before moving to Germany in 2011.

== Club career ==
=== Brisbane Roar ===
Recruited in 2006 by Miron Bleiberg, Kruse was injured during an otherwise successful A-League pre-season during training. He scored on his debut against Wellington Phoenix on 5 October 2007, his nineteenth birthday, with what was to be the winning goal for that game.

On 19 October 2007, Kruse struck against the Newcastle Jets for his second goal of his A-League career. On 16 November, he got his third with an excellent curling effort to the far post as Brisbane beat Melbourne 1–0.

Kruse and his close friend Michael Zullo formed a good partnership with each playing either side of a striker in a three-man attack for Brisbane which coincided with a seven match unbeaten streak.

Kruse's place in Roar's starting line-up was in jeopardy at the beginning of the 2008 A-League season after he was involved in an altercation outside a Queensland nightspot. The fight resulted in Kruse needing stitches and the then-19-year-old incurring the wrath of club coach Frank Farina, who offered Kruse only a short-term contract as a replacement for the injured Massimo Murdoca for the 2009–10 season.

=== Melbourne Victory ===
Kruse was linked to a move to reigning A-League premiers Melbourne Victory following the departure of Melbourne striker Danny Allsopp to Qatar club Al-Rayyan. On 10 September 2009, it was confirmed that Kruse had left the Roar for Melbourne Victory.

Kruse made his first appearance for the Victory on 13 September 2009 against Wellington Phoenix after replacing Ney Fabiano at the 58th minute. He scored his first goal for the Victory in the 4–0 demolition of Gold Coast United on 28 November 2009.

A highlight of Kruse's professional career was when he scored a first half hat-trick on 16 January 2010 against the Perth Glory. The Victory went on to win 6–2 as the Glory had no answer for Kruse's pace and well timed runs. His fifth goal came against Sydney FC in the major semi final when struck a curling shot which left Sydney FC keeper Clint Bolton no chance as it tore into the top right corner. His sixth goal for Melbourne came against Gold Coast United when he rounded goalkeeper and former teammate Glen Moss to slide the ball into the open net.

He was the first player to score a brace in a Melbourne derby, helping Victory to a 3–1 win over their rivals Melbourne Heart in December 2010.

At Victory, Kruse was known for turning his career around through his development and change of attitude, no longer getting caught up in off-field incidents like he did whilst in Brisbane, and taking his footballing potential much more seriously.

=== Fortuna Düsseldorf ===
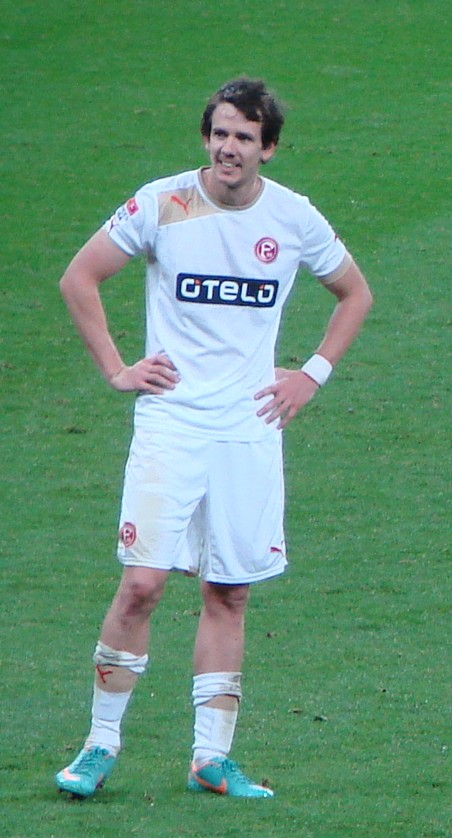
Kruse playing for Fortuna Düsseldorf in 2012.

Following his form for the Victory, Kruse signed with German side Fortuna Düsseldorf on a three-year contract beginning with the 2011–12 season. He made his competitive debut for the club on 24 July 2011 in a league match against SC Paderborn 07, making a substitute appearance in the second half. Kruse started in Fortuna's return to the Bundesliga in the 2012–13 season. He provided a flick on for Schahin leading to the first goal and a neat cross for Schahin's second. Fortuna went on to win the match 2–0 over Augsburg. He scored his first goal in the Bundesliga against Hoffenheim. In the 2–0 win over Hamburger SV, he scored his second goal of the Bundesliga campaign and then provided the assist for Fortuna's second.

=== Bayer Leverkusen ===
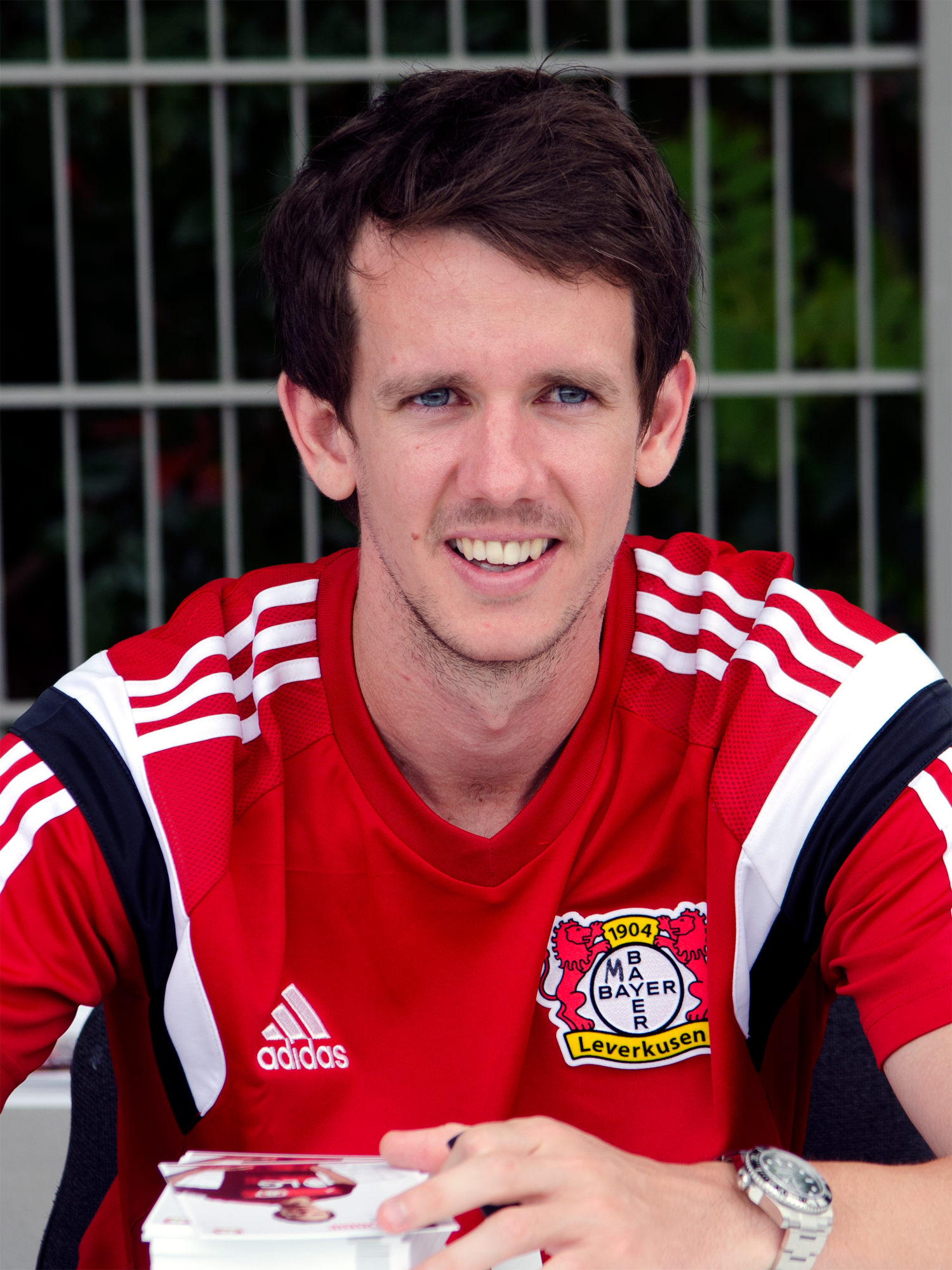
Kruse with Bayer Leverkusen in 2015

Kruse signed a three-year contract with German side Bayer Leverkusen for €1.5 million on 28 April 2013. He made his run-on debut against Mainz 05 in the Bundesliga on 21 September 2013, scoring two goals in a 4–1 victory.

==== Loan to VfB Stuttgart ====
On 31 August 2015, Kruse signed with VfB Stuttgart on loan until the end of the season with an option to buy. He made his first appearance for VfB Stuttgart in the away match against Hertha BSC on 11 September 2015, as a replacement for Martin Harnik early in the second half. The loan deal was prematurely terminated on 1 February 2016.

=== Liaoning Whowin ===
In May 2017, Kruse terminated his contract with Liaoning Whowin due to unpaid wages.

=== VfL Bochum ===
On 21 July 2017, Kruse joined German club VfL Bochum. He scored his debut goal for the club on 10 September 2017, netting the winning goal in a 2–1 victory over Darmstadt 98.

=== Return to Melbourne Victory ===
In July 2019, Kruse returned to the A-League, signing a two-year contract with Melbourne Victory.

Kruse was named as the Victory Medalist for the 2020–21 season; he made 19 appearances but no goals and one assist in that season.

Kruse left the Victory in June 2022 upon the expiration of his contract.

=== Return to Brisbane Roar ===
In February 2023, Brisbane Roar announced that Robbie Kruse would be returning to the club for the 2023 A-League season. Kruse only played 8 minutes for the Roar (against Sydney FC) before being released at the end of the season.

In November 2023, Kruse became the Brisbane Roar Academy Development and Talent ID coach.

== International career ==
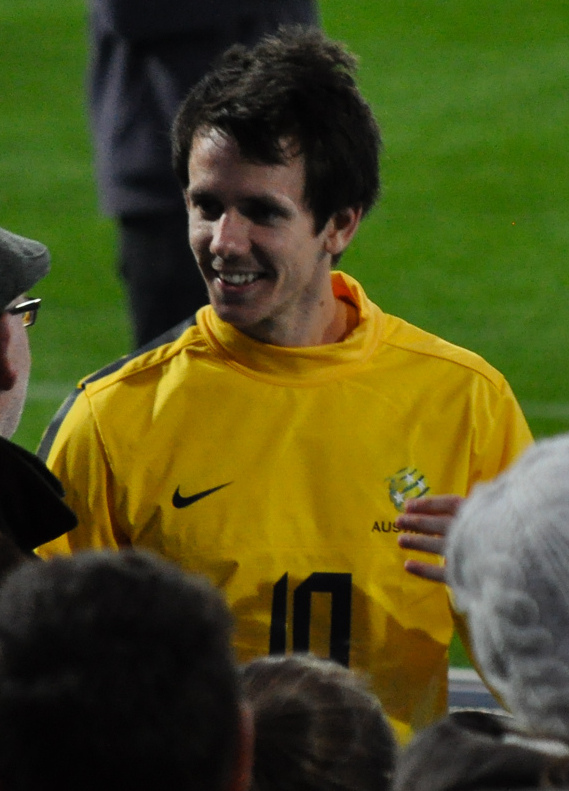
Kruse with Australia in 2013

On 28 December 2010, following his impressive level of play in the A-League Kruse was selected in the Australian national team's 23-man squad for the 2011 Asian Cup. On 5 January 2011, he made his Socceroos debut, coming off the bench against UAE in a pre-Asian Cup friendly match. On 25 January 2011, Kruse scored his first international goal, in a 6–0 victory over Uzbekistan in the semi-final of the 2011 AFC Asian Cup. In the final of the competition, he made a substitute appearance and almost scored a header with his first touch of the ball. Australia lost the final 1–0 in extra time.

Kruse scored his second international goal in a friendly match against Wales on 10 August 2011, which Australia won 2–1. He scored his third goal against Jordan on 11 June 2013, in a 2014 World Cup qualifier in which Australia won 4–0, and in which he was also Man of the Match, with two more assists on top of his goal. He missed out on a spot in the team for the 2014 FIFA World Cup with an injury.

Kruse was named as part of Australia's 2015 AFC Asian Cup squad. He made his first appearance of the tournament as a starter in Australia's first group game against Kuwait. He started Australia's second group game against Oman, scoring Australia's second goal of the game off a Massimo Luongo assist, in an eventual 4–0 win, with him being named man of the match in the same match.

Kruse started in the 2015 AFC Asian Cup Final. However, in the middle of the second half, he suffered an Achilles injury and was substituted off for James Troisi. Australia went on to win the match 2–1 with the match-winning goal coming through Troisi. Scans revealed that although Kruse's injury was not as serious as initially feared, he would still spend four months on the sidelines.

In May 2018, he was named in Australia's 23-man squad for the 2018 FIFA World Cup in Russia.

== Career statistics ==
=== Club ===
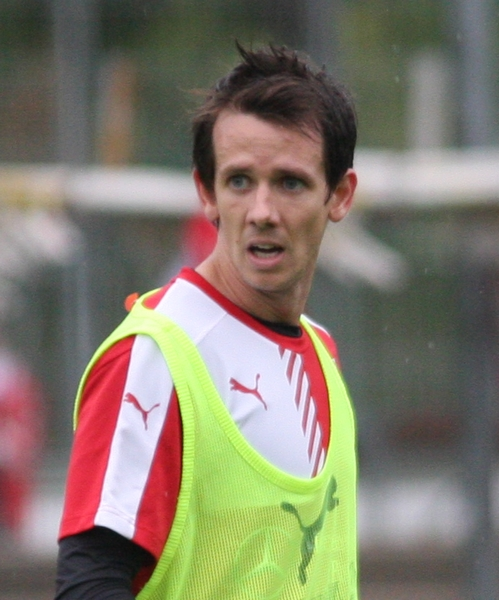
Kruse in 2015

As of 7 May 2023

Appearances and goals by club, season and competition
| Club | Season | League | | | National cup (Note: Includes Australia Cup, DFB-Pokal, Chinese FA Cup) | | League cup (Note: Includes A-League Pre-Season Challenge Cup) | | Continental | | Total | |
| Club | Season | Division | Apps | Goals | Apps | Goals | Apps | Goals | Apps | Goals | Apps | Goals |
|---|---|---|---|---|---|---|---|---|---|---|---|---|
| Queensland Roar | 2007–08 | A-League | 17 | 4 | – | | 0 | 0 | – | | 17 | 4 |
| Queensland Roar | 2008–09 | A-League | 4 | 0 | – | | 1 | 0 | – | | 5 | 0 |
| Queensland Roar | 2009–10 | A-League | 5 | 0 | – | | – | | – | | 5 | 0 |
| Queensland Roar | Total | | 26 | 4 | 0 | 0 | 1 | 0 | 0 | 0 | 27 | 4 |
| Melbourne Victory | 2009–10 | A-League | 20 | 5 | – | | – | | 4 | 0 | 24 | 5 |
| Melbourne Victory | 2010–11 | A-League | 19 | 11 | – | | – | | 4 | 0 | 23 | 11 |
| Melbourne Victory | Total | | 39 | 16 | 0 | 0 | 0 | 0 | 8 | 0 | 47 | 16 |
| Fortuna Düsseldorf II | 2011–12 | Regionalliga West | 2 | 0 | – | | – | | – | | 2 | 0 |
| Fortuna Düsseldorf | 2011–12 | 2. Bundesliga | 11 | 0 | 1 | 0 | – | | – | | 12 | 0 |
| Fortuna Düsseldorf | 2012–13 | Bundesliga | 30 | 4 | 3 | 0 | – | | – | | 33 | 4 |
| Fortuna Düsseldorf | Total | | 41 | 4 | 4 | 0 | 0 | 0 | 0 | 0 | 45 | 4 |
| Bayer 04 Leverkusen | 2013–14 | Bundesliga | 15 | 2 | 2 | 1 | – | | 4 | 0 | 21 | 3 |
| Bayer 04 Leverkusen | 2014–15 | Bundesliga | 4 | 0 | 1 | 0 | – | | 2 | 0 | 7 | 0 |
| Bayer 04 Leverkusen | 2015–16 | Bundesliga | 9 | 0 | 1 | 0 | – | | 5 | 0 | 15 | 0 |
| Bayer 04 Leverkusen | 2016–17 | Bundesliga | 0 | 0 | 2 | 0 | – | | 1 | 0 | 3 | 0 |
| Bayer 04 Leverkusen | Total | | 28 | 2 | 6 | 1 | 0 | 0 | 12 | 0 | 46 | 3 |
| VfB Stuttgart (loan) | 2015–16 | Bundesliga | 3 | 0 | 1 | 0 | – | | – | | 4 | 0 |
| Liaoning | 2017 | Chinese Super League | 4 | 0 | 0 | 0 | – | | – | | 4 | 0 |
| VfL Bochum | 2017–18 | 2. Bundesliga | 30 | 7 | 1 | 0 | – | | – | | 31 | 7 |
| VfL Bochum | 2018–19 | 2. Bundesliga | 14 | 1 | 0 | 0 | – | | – | | 14 | 1 |
| VfL Bochum | Total | | 44 | 8 | 1 | 0 | 0 | 0 | 0 | 0 | 45 | 8 |
| Melbourne Victory | 2019–20 | A-League | 11 | 2 | 0 | 0 | – | | 2 | 1 | 13 | 3 |
| Melbourne Victory | 2020–21 | A-League | 19 | 0 | – | | – | | – | | 19 | 0 |
| Melbourne Victory | 2021–22 | A-League Men | 10 | 1 | 5 | 0 | – | | 1 | 0 | 16 | 1 |
| Melbourne Victory | Total | | 40 | 3 | 5 | 0 | 0 | 0 | 3 | 1 | 48 | 4 |
| Brisbane Roar | 2022–23 | A-League Men | 1 | 0 | 0 | 0 | – | | – | | 1 | 0 |
| Total | | | 228 | 37 | 17 | 1 | 1 | 0 | 23 | 1 | 269 | 39 |

=== International ===
As of match played 25 January 2019

Appearances and goals by national team and year
| National team | Year | Apps | Goals |
|---|---|---|---|
| Australia | 2011 | 14 | 2 |
| Australia | 2012 | 7 | 0 |
| Australia | 2013 | 8 | 1 |
| Australia | 2014 | 3 | 0 |
| Australia | 2015 | 6 | 1 |
| Australia | 2016 | 10 | 0 |
| Australia | 2017 | 12 | 1 |
| Australia | 2018 | 10 | 0 |
| Australia | 2019 | 5 | 0 |
| Total | | 75 | 5 |

Scores and results list Australia's goal tally first, score column indicates score after each Kruse goal.

List of international goals scored by Robbie Kruse
| No. | Date | Venue | Opponent | Score | Result | Competition |
|---|---|---|---|---|---|---|
| 1 | 25 January 2011 | Khalifa International Stadium, Al Rayyan, Qatar | Uzbekistan | 6–0 | 6–0 | 2011 AFC Asian Cup |
| 2 | 10 August 2011 | Cardiff City Stadium, Cardiff, Wales | Wales | 2–0 | 2–1 | Friendly |
| 3 | 11 June 2013 | Docklands Stadium, Melbourne, Australia | Jordan | 3–0 | 4–0 | 2014 FIFA World Cup qualification |
| 4 | 13 January 2015 | Stadium Australia, Sydney, Australia | Oman | 2–0 | 4–0 | 2015 AFC Asian Cup |
| 5 | 5 October 2017 | Hang Jebat Stadium, Malacca, Malaysia | Syria | 1–0 | 1–1 | 2018 FIFA World Cup qualification |

== Honours ==
Australia

- AFC Asian Cup: 2015; runner-up 2011

Individual

- Melbourne Victory Young Player of the Year: 2009–10, 2010–11
- A-League PFA Team of the Season: 2010–11
- Harry Kewell Medal: 2012–13
- PFA Footballer of the Year: 2012–13
