= Paul Kohler (footballer) =

Australian soccer player

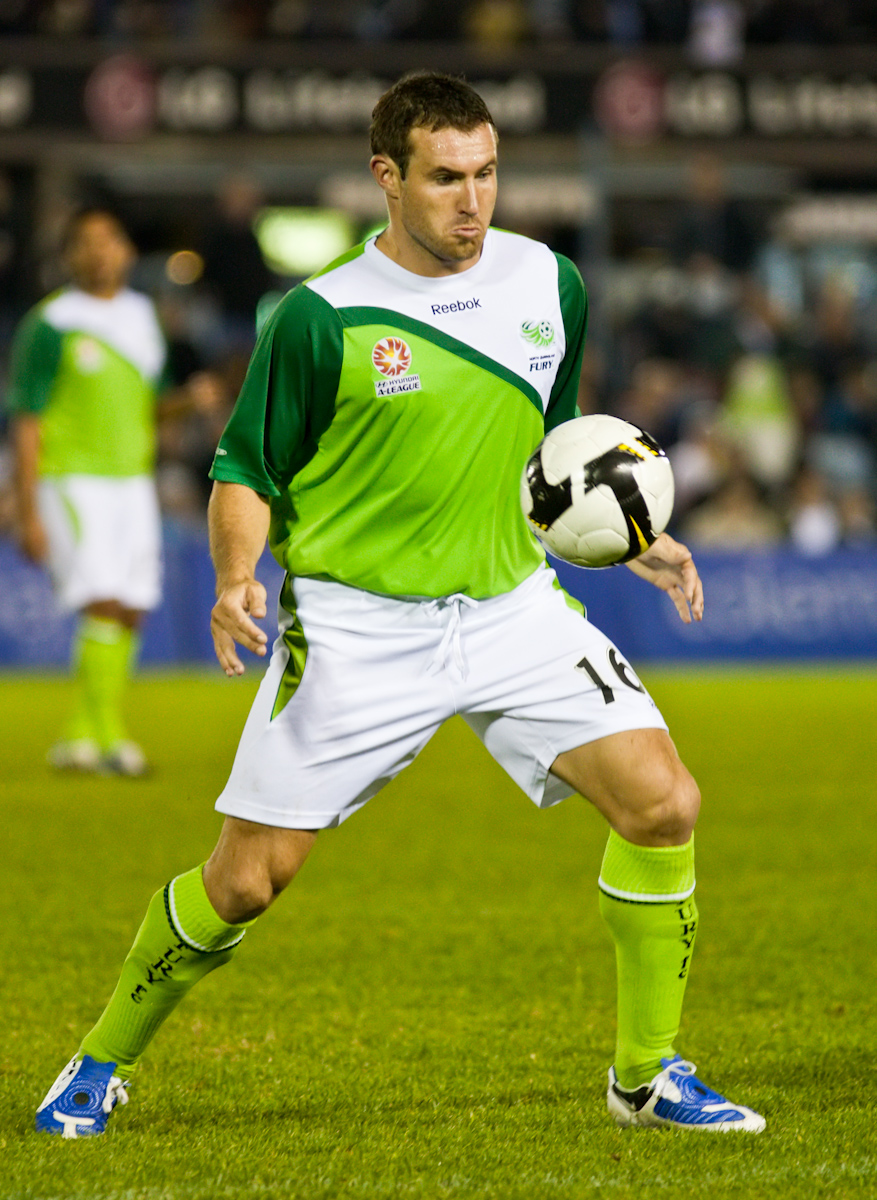

Personal information
- Date of birth: 5 August 1979 (age 47)
- Place of birth: Sydney, Australia
- Height: 1.75 m (5 ft 9 in)
- Positions: Centre back; central midfielder

Youth career
- Menai Hawks

Senior career*
Years	Team	Apps	(Gls)
1995–1998	Wollongong Wolves	38	(0)
1999–2004	Sydney Olympic	107	(1)
2007–2008	Sutherland Sharks		
2005–2008	Newcastle Jets	48	(0)
2009–2010	North Queensland Fury	21	(0)
2010–2011	Sutherland Sharks	33	(1)
2011–2014	Rockdale City Suns	69	(5)
2019–	MA Olympic	53	(1)
- * Club domestic league appearances and goals as of 27 September 2022

Paul Kohler (born 5 August 1979) is an Australian professional soccer player.

== Career ==
In February 2005, Kohler signed with Newcastle Jets to play in the newly formed A-League.

Kohler rejoined Sutherland Sharks in May 2010. He moved to Rockdale City Suns for the next season.

== Honours ==
=== Club ===
Sydney Olympic:

- NSL Championship: 2001-2002

Newcastle Jets:

- A-League Championship: 2007-2008
