= Steve Fitzsimmons =

Australian soccer player

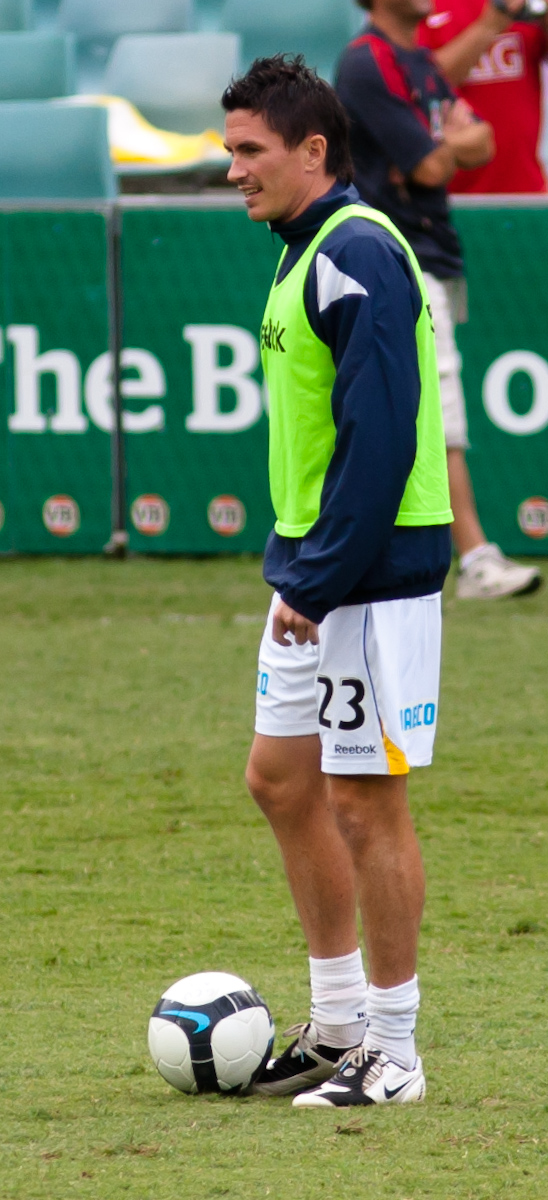

Personal information
- Full name: Steve Fitzsimmons
- Date of birth: 7 September 1976 (age 50)
- Place of birth: Liverpool, England
- Height: 1.84 m (6 ft 1/2 in)
- Position: Right-back

Senior career*
Years	Team	Apps	(Gls)
2001–2002	Parramatta Power	18	(1)
2002–2003	Marconi	7	(0)
2002–2003	Queensland Lions	12	(6)
2003–2004	Brisbane Strikers	26	(2)
2005–2006	New Zealand Knights	11	(0)
2006–2007	Brisbane Roar	1	(0)
2007–2008	Palm Beach	25	(5)
2008–2009	Beenleigh	24	(7)
2009–2011	Gold Coast United	34	(2)
2011–2013	Burleigh Heads	65	(14)
Total		233	(35)

Managerial career
- 2011–2012: Gold Coast United (asst coach)
- * Club domestic league appearances and goals as of 16:47, 12 February 2011 (UTC) ‡ National team caps and goals as of 17:30, 10 November 2010 (UTC)

Steve Fitzsimmons (born 7 September 1976) is a former Australian football (soccer) player and coach.

== Club career ==
Steve started his NSL career with Parramatta Power under coach & former Socceroo David Mitchell and his assistant coach Lawrie McKinna. In what was a breakout year for Fitzsimmons he saw moves to Hull City and Leyton Orient break down in 2001 returning to Australia and signing with NSL glamour club Marconi Stallions.

A frustrating year at the Stallions was ended when Fitzsimmons returned home to Queensland and signed a 2-year contract with the Brisbane Strikers under rookie coach Stuart McClaren. The Strikers made the NSL finals only to lose to Adelaide United on the away goals rule not only to bring down the curtain on their season but also that of the National Soccer League.

Fitzsimmons was signed by the foundation A-League club New Zealand Knights for the inaugural year of the A-League in what was a largely unsuccessful year for the club. On 25 January 2006 he agreed to part ways with the New Zealand Knights allowing him to look for a new club before the close of the January transfer window. Fitzsimmons linked up with his former Queensland state coach Miron Bleiberg touring Korea in pre-season with the Queensland Roar. Steve scored the only goal in the opening game of the Tongyeong Cup against Incheon United. He was subsequently signed to a short-term contract with Queensland Roar making a solitary appearance before being released at the conclusion of the season after Bleiberg was replaced by Frank Farina.

This looked to spell the end to Fitzsimmons's national league career as he went on to play for Brisbane Premier League side Palm Beach SC. The following year he moved to Beenleigh Football Club in the Brisbane Premier League Division 1 where he enjoyed a successful season playing 24 games for the club scoring 7 times including an important goal the club's Grand Final win against Capalaba Football Club. He was also on top in the Player of the Year award voting for Brisbane Premier League Division as voted by referees but was ruled ineligible due to a sending off against Albany Creek Excellsior Soccer Club in Round 21.

Late in 2008, Fitzsimmons was rewarded for his performances while at Beenleigh Football Club by being one of the first signings for Gold Coast United.

On 21 August 2009, he scored his first ever A-League goal in a 2–0 win for Gold Coast during the second half of United's game against Adelaide at Hindmarsh Stadium.

Fitzsimmons turned down a move to Chinese Super League Club Qingdao Jonoon at the end of the 2009/10 season & he was rewarded for his performances with a new 1-year contract at Gold Coast United for the 2010/11 season taking him up to his 34th birthday.

After retiring at the end of the 2010–11 A-League season, Fitzsimmons joined the staff at the club becoming Assistant Coach.
