= Robson (footballer, born 1986) =

Brazilian footballer

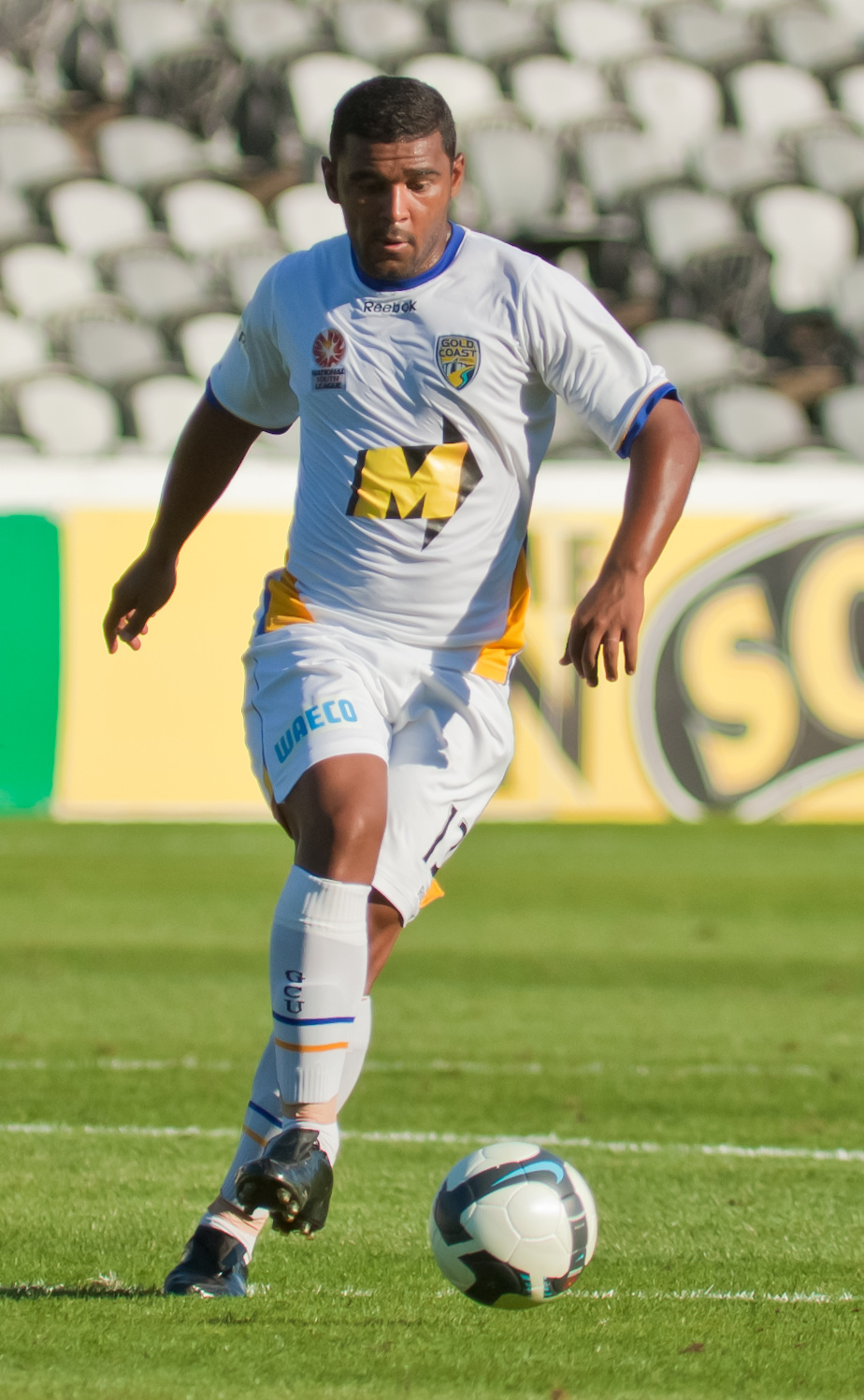

Personal information
- Date of birth: 3 November 1986 (age 39)
- Place of birth: Rio de Janeiro, Brazil
- Height: 1.75 m (5 ft 9 in)
- Position: Central midfielder

Team information
- Current team: Marília Atlético Clube

Youth career
- 1994–2004: Flamengo

Senior career*
| Years | Team | Apps | (Gls) |
| 2004–2007 | Flamengo | 34 | (0) |
| 2007–2009 | Cabofriense | 43 | (6) |
| 2009–2012 | Gold Coast United | 36 | (3) |
| 2012–2013 | Ayia Napa | 4 | (0) |
| 2013 | Baraúnas | 2 | (0) |
| 2014– | Marília | 12 | (1) |

International career^{‡}
- Brazil U-15
- Brazil U-17
- * Club domestic league appearances and goals as of 31 March 2012 ‡ National team caps and goals as of 17:30, 20 January 2010 (UTC)

Robson Alves da Silva (born 3 November 1986, in Rio de Janeiro), known as Robson, is a Brazilian footballer who currently plays for Marília Atlético Clube.

== Biography ==
=== Club career ===
Robson played for Brazilian clubs Flamengo and Cabofriense between 2004 and 2008.

On 15 December 2008, it was announced that Robson, and fellow Brazilian Jefferson had signed one-year deals to play for A-League club Gold Coast United.

Robson was spotted playing for a match arranged for scouts in Rio de Janeiro. He scored on his A-League debut for Gold Coast United United against Brisbane Roar in a 3–1 victory.

After an impressive debut performance against Brisbane Roar where Robson scored the third goal in the 3–1 win, he was offered a 3-year deal by Gold Coast which he also signed.

He was caught drunk driving after a night out with friends. Robson landed himself in hot water once more with Gold Coast manager Miron Bleiberg and faced being axed from Gold Coast United, after he failed to show up to a Youth League game after being dropped from the first XI soon after the loss to Adelaide United.

== Honours ==
Flamengo

- Copa Record Rio de Futebol: 2005
