= Steve Pantelidis =

Australian soccer player

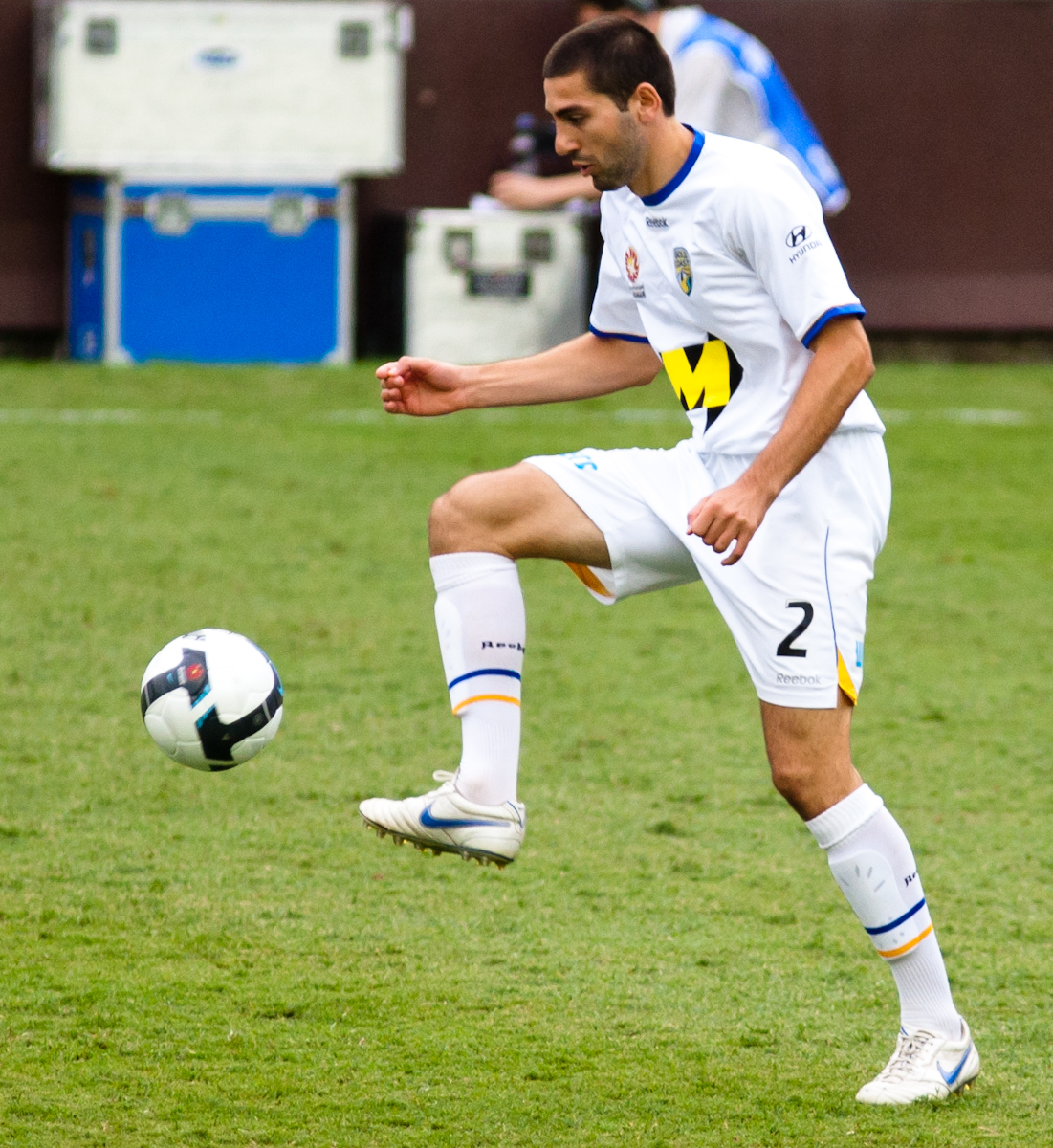

Personal information
- Full name: Steve Pantelidis
- Date of birth: 17 August 1983 (age 43)
- Place of birth: Melbourne, Australia
- Height: 1.85 m (6 ft 1 in)
- Positions: Central defender; midfielder

Team information
- Current team: Oakleigh Cannons

Youth career
- 2000: AIS

Senior career*
| Years | Team | Apps | (Gls) |
| 2001–2002 | Altona East | 35 | (2) |
| 2003 | FC Aarhus | 2 | (0) |
| 2003–2004 | Melbourne Knights | 13 | (0) |
| 2004 | Oakleigh Cannons | 17 | (0) |
| 2005 | Heidelberg United | 4 | (0) |
| 2005–2009 | Melbourne Victory | 58 | (0) |
| 2009–2011 | Gold Coast United | 49 | (1) |
| 2010–2011 | Bintang Medan | 16 | (2) |
| 2011–2013 | Perth Glory | 49 | (0) |
| 2013–2014 | Selangor FA | 33 | (2) |
| 2015–2018 | Oakleigh Cannons | 79 | (1) |

International career^{‡}
| 2003 | Australia U20 | 1 | (0) |
- * Club domestic league appearances and goals as of 24 September 2018 ‡ National team caps and goals as of 14 August 2014

Steve Pantelidis (born 17 August 1983) is a former Australian soccer player who plays as a central defender.

== Club career ==
=== Early career ===
Pantelidis was reportedly a keen football player who showed plenty of potential competing against other schools. After excelling in the state championships, representing his home state Victoria, Pantelidis was selected to represent the Australian Institute of Sport (AIS). After completing his apprenticeship he joined Altona East Phoenix in the Victorian premier league. In his second year at the club he was voted player of the year.

=== Denmark ===
Pantelidis moved overseas at the age of 19 years and signed for FC Aarhus, after his successful year at Altona East Phoenix.

=== Return to Australia ===
After finding it hard to settle in Denmark, Pantelidis returned to Australia after 6 months and signed for Melbourne Knights in the National Soccer League (NSL). During his time at Melbourne Knights he was selected to represent Australia at Under-20 level. He subsequently went to the World Cup in the United Arab Emirates where Australia reached the quarter final. During the period where Australia's national football league was being reformed, Pantelidis played both for Oakleigh Cannons and Heidelberg United in the Victorian Premier League.

=== Melbourne Victory ===
After excelling in the Victorian Premier League, Melbourne Victory FC snapped Pantelidis up for the start of the A-League where he spent 4 years. During his time at Melbourne Victory FC he was awarded 'The Age young player of the year' and won two A-League Championships with the club.

=== Gold Coast United ===
In 2009, he signed a 2-year deal with the new franchise in the A-League, Gold Coast United FC. Pantelidis played 49 games for Gold Coast FC.

=== Medan Bintang FC ===
After a successful and productive 2 years at Gold Coast United FC, Pantelidis was approached by Medan Bintang FC in the newly formed Liga Primer Indonesia, where he signed a 2-year deal. After only two weeks at the club he was made captain by former Bundesliga coach Michael Fichenbiger. Unfortunately, the league collapsed and Pantelidis returned to the A-League where he signed for Perth Glory FC.

=== Perth Glory ===
After returning from Indonesia and signing with Perth Glory on the eve of the start of the season, Pantelidis had an outstanding year. After breaking into the side he played 22 straight games cementing his spot as a no-nonsense and clever centre back. Steve helped Perth Glory reach the Grand Final narrowly losing to Brisbane Roar 2 -1 after a controversial decision by the referee. He signed a 2-year extension after the final which will see him in Perth till the end of the 2013–14 season.

=== Selangor ===
At the end of 2013, Pantelidis left Perth Glory to join Malaysia Super League team Selangor FA, joining former Melbourne Victory coach Mehmet Durakovic.

== Honours ==
With Melbourne Victory:

- A-League Championship: 2006–2007, 2008–2009
- A-League Premiership: 2006–2007, 2008–2009

The Age Young Player of the Year A-League 2006–2007
