= Jefferson (footballer, born 1982) =

Brazilian footballer

Personal information
- Full name: Jefferson Charles de Souza Pinto
- Date of birth: March 28, 1982 (age 44)
- Place of birth: Rio de Janeiro, Brazil
- Height: 1.72 m (5 ft 8 in)
- Position: Attacking midfielder

Youth career
- 1997–2001: Flamengo

Senior career*
Years	Team	Apps	(Gls)
2002	Criciúma	0	(0)
2003–2005	Olaria		
2006–2007	Atlético Roraima		
2009–2010	Gold Coast United	1	(0)
- * Club domestic league appearances and goals

Jefferson Charles de Souza Pinto, known as Jefferson (born March 28, 1982), is a Brazilian football player who last played for Gold Coast United.

== Club career ==
On December 15, 2008, Jefferson was signed to a one-year deal by A-League club, Gold Coast United. He was released after one appearance due to injuries, to be replaced by fellow Brazilian Anderson.
