= Miron Bleiberg =

Israeli-Australian football manager

Miron Bleiberg מירון בלייברג
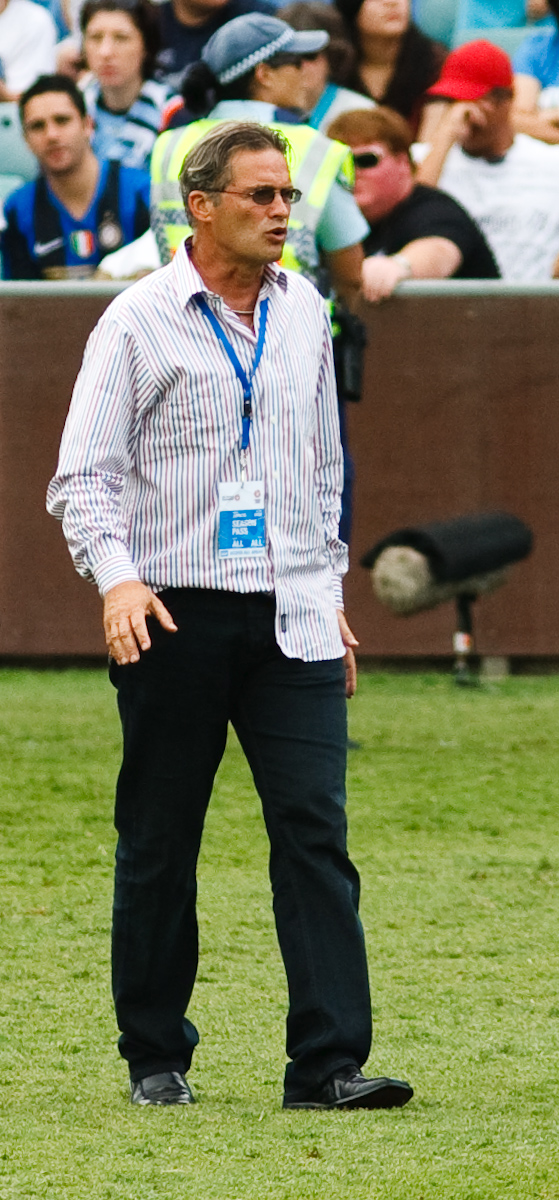

Personal information
- Date of birth: 9 February 1955 (age 71)
- Place of birth: Haifa, Israel

Youth career
- Years: Team
- Maccabi Haifa

Managerial career
- 1982–1983: Hapoel HaTzair Kiryat Haim
- 1985–1986: Melbourne Knights
- 1987–1988: Maribyrnong Polonia
- 1988–1989: Croydon City
- 1989–1990: Heidelberg United
- 1991–1993: Brisbane United
- 1994–1995: North Star FC
- 1995–2000: Brisbane Lions
- 2000–2002: Queensland State Team
- 2002–2004: Queensland Lions
- 2004–2006: Queensland Roar
- 2007–2008: Gold Coast Stars
- 2009–2012: Gold Coast United
- 2013–2015: Oakleigh Cannons

Miron Bleiberg (Hebrew: מירון בלייברג) is an Israeli-Australian football (soccer) manager.

== Biography ==
Bleiberg was educated at the Hebrew Reali School in Haifa, Israel. A former captain in the Israeli Navy, Bleiberg commanded patrol boats and missile boats, covering the coastline from Haifa to Sinai and the Red Sea. In Israel, he coached Hapoel HaTzair Kiryat Haim, which at the time played in Liga Bet, the fourth tier of Israeli football league system. After moving to Australia, he coached Melbourne Croatia for the 1985 and 1986 NSL seasons. The following year he coached Maribyrnong Polonia for the initial 12 rounds, until the club fell into financial difficulties.

The team eventually went on to win the 1987 Victorian State League title. This was followed by stints at Croydon City, Heidelberg United and the Brisbane Strikers, before going on to secure a string of successes in the Queensland Premier League with NorthStar and Queensland Lions.

=== Queensland Roar ===
Appointed the coach of the Queensland Roar for the inaugural season of the A-League, the Roar missed the finals, although the side's entertaining style of football won plaudits from the media and supporters. Bleiberg's outspoken views and colourful quotes in the style of Jose Mourinho has made many headlines. After the Roar slipped from an auspicious start to the 2006/7 season to fourth position following Round 15, Bleiberg resigned as coach and was replaced by former Socceroos coach Frank Farina.

=== Gold Coast United FC ===
Bleiberg had backed a new A-League club Gold Coast Galaxy, to be based on the Gold Coast, Queensland. Ultimately, the Galaxy consortium led by real estate magnate Fred Taplin, was trumped by a rival bid from mining billionaire Clive Palmer. Upon receiving expansion approval from the FFA, Palmer appointed Bleiberg as head coach and football director for Gold Coast United. In their first two seasons, Gold Coast made the finals, finishing an impressive 3rd in their debut season. In what was a world's first for football, Bleiberg was miked-up during the game against Wellington Phoenix in round 15 on 15 January 2012, providing insight into a head coach on game day.

During the week preceding the game with Melbourne Heart on 18 February 2012, Gold Coast owner Clive Palmer announced that he would be giving 17-year-old Mitch Cooper the Captaincy on his A-League debut, replacing suspended skipper Michael Thwaite. In response to the announcement, Bleiberg claimed that the appointment was a merely ceremonial move, allowing him to take the coin toss, then allow Kristian Rees to take over the on-field captaining.

However, Clive Palmer suspended Bleiberg for the game against Heart, unhappy with Bleibergs comments over the move. The suspension was soon made indefinite, with Gold Coast CEO Clive Mensink claiming it was inappropriate for Bleiberg not to take the appointment seriously. and that the comments made were disrespectful to Cooper and Palmer. On Sunday, 19 February, Bleiberg walked out on the club, claiming that Palmer took away his dignity and had been deeply offended by the move to suspend him.

=== Oakleigh Cannons FC ===
Bleiberg joined Victorian Premier League club Oakleigh Cannons FC five rounds into the 2013 season, after Oakleigh parted ways with former manager Bill Theodoropoulos. In April 2015, Bleiberg departed the Cannons, being replaced by Arthur Papas.

== Managerial statistics ==
As of 25 March 2024.

Team	Nat	From	To	Record				
Team	Nat	From	To	G	W	D	L	Win %
Brisbane Roar	(Australia)	2 March 2005	2007	34	11	11	12	32.35
Gold Coast United	(Australia)	8 August 2009	19 February 2012	81	30	21	30	37.04
Total				115	41	32	42	35.65

== Honours ==
- NSL Cup
  - 1986 (Melbourne Croatia)
- Victoria State League
  - 1987 (Maribyrnong Polonia)
- Queensland Premier League and Grand Final
  - 1994 (North Star)
  - 1996, 1997, 1998, 1999, 2001, 2002, 2003, 2004 (Brisbane/QLD Lions)
