= List of Gold Coast United FC players =

Gold Coast United Football Club was an Australian professional football (soccer) club based on the Gold Coast of Queensland. The club was formed in 2008, and played their first competitive match in August 2009 in the A-League. The club played its home matches at Robina Stadium. More than 50 players appeared for the Gold Coast side in their three seasons, those players are listed here.

Gold Coast United's record appearance-maker is Michael Thwaite, who played 82 matches for the club.

== Key ==
- The list is ordered first by date of debut, and then if necessary in alphabetical order.
- Appearances as a substitute are included.

Positions key
GK	Goalkeeper
DF	Defender
MF	Midfielder
FW	Forward

Nationality
Unless otherwise noted, the nationality of a player is determined by the country/countries which he has played for, or if said person has not played international football, their country of birth.
Position
Playing positions are listed according to the tactical formations that were employed at the time.
Club career
Club career is defined as the first and last calendar years in which the player appeared for the club in any of the competitions listed below.
Total appearances and Total goals
Total appearances and goals comprise those in the A-League.

== Players ==
List of Gold Coast United FC players
Player	Nationality	Pos	Club career	Starts	Subs	Total	Goals	Ref.
Player	Nationality	Pos	Club career	Appearances			Goals	Ref.
Jason Culina	Australia	MF	2009–2010	44	0	44	8	
Adam Griffiths	Australia	DF	2009	1	0	1	0	
Scott Higgins	Australia	GK	2009–2010	12	1	13	0	
Tahj Minniecon	Australia	FW	2009–2012	17	22	39	1	
Matthew Osman	Australia	U	2009–2010	5	10	15	0	
Daniel Piorkowski	Australia	DF	2009	2	0	2	0	
Joel Porter	Australia	FW	2009–2011	30	13	43	7	
Robson	Brazil	MF	2009–2011	27	9	36	2	
Shane Smeltz	New Zealand	FW	2009–2011	38	0	38	28	
Michael Thwaite	Australia	DF	2009–2012	82	0	82	1	
Bas van den Brink	Netherlands	DF	2009–2011	48	3	51	3	
Kristian Rees	Australia	DF	2009–2012	63	10	73	4	
Steve Pantelidis	Australia	DF	2009–2011	37	12	49	1	
Milson	Brazil	FW	2009	1	8	9	0	
Zenon Caravella	Australia	MF	2009–2011	46	6	52	1	
Steve Fitzsimmons	Australia	U	2009–2011	17	17	34	2	
Adama Traoré	Ivory Coast	DF	2009–2012	67	2	69	3	
Anderson	Brazil	DF	2009–2011	39	9	48	0	
Golgol Mebrahtu	Australia	FW	2009–2012	14	12	26	0	
Jess Vanstrattan	Australia	GK	2009–2010	18	0	18	0	
Steven Lustica	Australia	MF	2009–2011	1	3	4	0	
Andrew Barisic	Australia	FW	2009–2011	3	14	17	2	
James Brown	Australia	MF	2009–2012	27	11	38	9	
Mark Byrnes	Australia	DF	2009	0	1	1	0	
Jefferson	Brazil	MF	2009	1	0	1	0	
Mitch Bevan	Australia	MF	2009–2012	3	5	8	0	
Zac Anderson	Australia	DF	2009–2012	12	5	17	1	
Ben Wearing	Australia	DF	2009	1	0	1	0	
Charlie Miller	Scotland	MF	2009–2010	8	2	10	1	
Dino Djulbic	Australia	DF	2010–2011	37	3	40	4	
Glen Moss	New Zealand	GK	2010–2011	41	0	41	0	
John Curtis	England	DF	2010–2011	12	7	19	1	
Ben Halloran	Australia	MF	2010–2012	22	4	26	4	
Bruce Djite	Australia	FW	2010–2011	23	0	23	10	
Chris Broadfoot	Australia	FW	2010–2011	0	5	5	0	
Chris Harold	Australia	FW	2010–2012	10	14	24	2	
Joshua Brillante	Australia	U	2010–2012	11	3	14	0	
Jerrad Tyson	Australia	GK	2010–2012	14	1	15	0	
Peter Perchtold	Germany	MF	2011	10	0	10	0	
Kim Sung-kil	South Korea	MF	2011	1	0	1	0	
Paul Beekmans	Netherlands	DF	2011–2012	14	0	14	0	
Peter Jungschläger	Netherlands	MF	2011–2012	21	1	22	2	
Dylan Macallister	Australia	FW	2011–2012	11	4	15	3	
Dylan McGowan	Australia	DF	2011–2012	14	4	18	0	
Ante Rožić	Croatia	DF	2011–2012	10	0	10	0	
Daniel Severino	Australia	MF	2011–2012	0	12	12	1	
Maceo Rigters	Netherlands	FW	2011–2012	19	3	22	4	
Ambesager Yosief	Eritrea	DF	2011	0	3	3	0	
Jonas Salley	Ivory Coast	MF	2011–2012	12	0	12	0	
Daniel Bowles	Australia	DF	2011–2012	8	4	12	2	
Chris Lucas	Australia	FW	2012	0	1	1	0	
Chris O'Connor	Australia	GK	2012	3	0	3	0	
Daniel Bragg	Australia	MF	2012	1	2	3	0	
Jake Barker-Daish	Australia	MF	2012	4	3	7	0	
Mitch Cooper	Australia	MF	2012	5	1	6	1	

== Club captains ==
Two players held the position of captain of Gold Coast United. The first club captain was Jason Culina, who was captain from 2009 to 2011. After Culina left the club, Michael Thwaite was named captain, a position he held until the end of the club's final season in 2012.

Dates	Name	Notes
2009–2011	(Australia) Jason Culina	Longest-serving captain in Gold-Coast's history
2011–2012	(Australia) Michael Thwaite	

== Notes ==
- A utility player is one who is considered to play in more than one position.
