= 2011–12 Gold Coast United FC season =

Gold Coast United
2011–12 season
- Chairman: Clive Palmer
- Manager: Miron Bleiberg (until 19 February 2012); Mike Mulvey (from 20 February 2012)
- A-League: 10th
- Top goalscorer: League: James Brown (6); All: James Brown (6)
Home colours	Away colours

The 2011–12 Gold Coast United season was the Gold Coast United's third and final season in the A-League.

== Season overview ==
On 23 September 2011, it was announced the club would start a youth academy consisting of 22 players who missed out on a place in the NYL squad. It has been speculated that the aim of this project is to address issues of community engagement.

On 19 February 2012, Miron Bleiberg was fired as manager, with Mike Mulvey taking over the following day.

== Transfers ==
=== In ===
Date	Position	Nationality	Name	From	Fee	Ref.
8 June 2011	MF	(Netherlands)	Paul Beekmans	Cambuur	Free	
1 July 2011	DF	(Netherlands)	Peter Jungschläger	De Graafschap	Free	
10 August 2011	DF	(Croatia)	Ante Rožić	Arka Gdynia	Free	
11 August 2011	FW	(Australia)	Dylan Macallister	Breiðablik	Free	
26 August 2011	DF	(Eritrea)	Samuel Tesfagabr	Western Strikers	Free	
26 August 2011	DF	(Eritrea)	Ambesager Yosief	Western Strikers	Free	
1 September 2011	FW	(Australia)	Maceo Rigters	Blackburn Rovers	Free	
23 December 2011	GK	(Australia)	Chris O'Connor	Bohemian	Free	
	DF	(Australia)	Daniel Bowles	Brisbane Roar	Free	
	MF	(Australia)	Jake Barker-Daish	AIS	Free	
	MF	(Australia)	Daniel Severino	Sydney Olympic	Free	
	MF	(Ivory Coast)	Jonas Salley	Chengdu Blades	Free	
	MF	(Australia)	Daniel Bragg	Blacktown City	Free	
	MF	(Australia)	Mitch Cooper	QAS	Free	
	FW	(Australia)	Chris Lucas	Gold Coast City	Free	

=== Released ===
Date	Position	Nationality	Name	Joined	Date
26 March 2012	GK	(New Zealand)	Glen Moss	Wellington Phoenix	28 March 2012
26 March 2012	GK	(Australia)	Jerrad Tyson	Western Sydney Wanderers	2 August 2012
26 March 2012	GK	(Australia)	Brendan White		
26 March 2012	GK	(Australia)	Chris O'Connor		
26 March 2012	DF	(Australia)	Michael Thwaite	Perth Glory	
26 March 2012	DF	(Australia)	Zac Anderson	Central Coast Mariners	15 May 2012
26 March 2012	DF	(Australia)	Kristian Rees	Palm Beach	2014
26 March 2012	DF	(Croatia)	Ante Rožić	Metalurh Zaporizhya	2012
26 March 2012	DF	(Ivory Coast)	Adama Traoré	Melbourne Victory	2012
26 March 2012	DF	(Eritrea)	Samuel Tesfagabr	Adelaide Comets	2013
26 March 2012	DF	(Eritrea)	Ambesager Yosief	Western Strikers	2012
26 March 2012	DF	(Australia)	Daniel Bowles	Adelaide United	22 March 2012
26 March 2012	MF	(Australia)	Joshua Brillante	Newcastle Jets	11 May 2012
26 March 2012	MF	(Netherlands)	Paul Beekmans	Almere City	
26 March 2012	MF	(Brazil)	Robson	Ayia Napa	
26 March 2012	MF	(Australia)	Jake Barker-Daish	Adelaide United	6 April 2012
26 March 2012	MF	(Australia)	Ben Halloran	Brisbane Roar	13 May 2012
26 March 2012	MF	(Australia)	Daniel Severino	Marconi Stallions	
26 March 2012	MF	(Netherlands)	Peter Jungschläger	RKC Waalwijk	
26 March 2012	MF	(Ivory Coast)	Jonas Salley	Shanghai Shenxin	
26 March 2012	MF	(Australia)	Daniel Bragg	Blacktown City	
26 March 2012	MF	(Australia)	Mitch Cooper	Newcastle Jets	25 May 2012
26 March 2012	FW	(Australia)	Golgol Mebrahtu	Melbourne Heart	
26 March 2012	FW	(Australia)	Joel Porter	West Adelaide	
26 March 2012	FW	(Australia)	Tahj Minniecon	Western Sydney Wanderers	8 August 2012
26 March 2012	FW	(Australia)	Dylan Macallister	Rockdale City Suns	25 May 2012
26 March 2012	FW	(Netherlands)	Maceo Rigters		
26 March 2012	FW	(Australia)	Chris Harold	Perth Glory	
26 March 2012	FW	(Australia)	James Brown	Newcastle Jets	15 February 2012
26 March 2012	FW	(Australia)	Mitch Bevan		
26 March 2012	FW	(Australia)	Chris Lucas	Palm Beach	

== Squad ==
As of match played 9 March 2012

No.	Name	Nationality	Position	Date of birth (Age (Note: Age as of the end of the season))	Signed from	Signed in	Contract ends	Apps.	Goals
Goalkeepers
1	Glen Moss	(New Zealand)	GK	19 January 1983 (aged 29)	Melbourne Victory	2010	2012	41	0
20	Jerrad Tyson	(Australia)	GK	21 September 1989 (aged 22)	Brisbane Strikers	2010		15	0
30	Brendan White	(Australia)	GK	16 April 1992 (aged 19)		2011		0	0
40	Chris O'Connor	(Australia)	GK	7 May 1985 (aged 26)	Bohemian	2011		3	0
Defenders
3	Michael Thwaite	(Australia)	DF	2 May 1983 (aged 28)	Brann	2009		82	1
4	Zac Anderson	(Australia)	DF	30 April 1991 (aged 20)	QAS	2009		19	1
5	Kristian Rees	(Australia)	DF	6 January 1980 (aged 32)	Adelaide City	2009	2011	73	4
13	Ante Rožić	(Croatia)	DF	8 March 1986 (aged 26)	Arka Gdynia	2011		11	0
15	Adama Traoré	(Ivory Coast)	DF	3 February 1990 (aged 22)	EF Yéo Martial	2009		69	3
26	Samuel Tesfagabr	(Eritrea)	DF	5 May 1985 (aged 26)	Western Strikers	2011		0	0
27	Ambesager Yosief	(Eritrea)	DF	29 June 1984 (aged 27)	Western Strikers	2011		3	0
28	Daniel Bowles	(Australia)	DF	19 October 1991 (aged 20)	Brisbane Roar	2011		12	2
Midfielders
2	Joshua Brillante	(Australia)	MF	25 March 1993 (aged 18)	QAS	2010		17	0
6	Paul Beekmans	(Netherlands)	MF	3 January 1982 (aged 30)	Cambuur	2011		14	0
8	Robson	(Brazil)	MF	3 November 1986 (aged 25)	Cabofriense	2009		34	2
11	Jake Barker-Daish	(Australia)	MF	7 May 1993 (aged 18)	AIS	2011		7	0
14	Ben Halloran	(Australia)	MF	14 June 1992 (aged 19)	QAS	2010		26	4
21	Daniel Severino	(Australia)	MF	11 February 1982 (aged 30)	Sydney Olympic	2011		12	1
22	Peter Jungschläger	(Netherlands)	MF	22 May 1984 (aged 27)	De Graafschap	2011		22	2
24	Jonas Salley	(Ivory Coast)	MF	16 March 1982 (aged 29)	Chengdu Blades	2011		12	0
31	Daniel Bragg	(Australia)	MF	3 August 1982 (aged 29)	Blacktown City	2012		3	0
33	Mitch Cooper	(Australia)	MF	18 September 1994 (aged 17)	QAS	2012		6	1
Forwards
7	Golgol Mebrahtu	(Australia)	FW	28 August 1990 (aged 21)	Brisbane Strikers	2009		26	0
9	Joel Porter	(Australia)	FW	25 December 1978 (aged 33)	Hartlepool United	2009		43	7
10	Tahj Minniecon	(Australia)	FW	13 February 1989 (aged 23)	AIS	2009	2012	39	1
12	Dylan Macallister	(Australia)	FW	17 May 1982 (aged 29)	Breiðablik	2011		15	3
16	Maceo Rigters	(Netherlands)	FW	22 January 1984 (aged 28)	Blackburn Rovers	2011		22	4
17	Chris Harold	(Australia)	FW	14 July 1992 (aged 19)	Brisbane Force	2010		25	2
18	James Brown	(Australia)	MF	19 February 1990 (aged 22)	AIS	2009	2012	38	9
28	Mitch Bevan	(Australia)	MF	20 February 1991 (aged 21)	Brisbane Roar	2009		8	0
32	Chris Lucas	(Australia)	FW	29 September 1981 (aged 30)	Palm Beach Sharks	2011		1	0

== Competitions ==
=== A-League ===
==== League table ====
Pos	Team	Pld	W	D	L	GF	GA	GD	Pts	Qualification
1	Central Coast Mariners	27	15	6	6	40	24	+16	51	Qualification for 2013 AFC Champions League group stage and finals series (Note: First place qualifies for the 2013 AFC Champions League group stage. Winning the 2012 A-League Grand Final automatically earns qualification for the 2013 AFC Champions League qualifying play-off, unless first place are champions.)
2	Brisbane Roar (C)	27	14	7	6	50	28	+22	49	Qualification for 2013 AFC Champions League qualifying play-off and finals series
3	Perth Glory	27	13	4	10	40	35	+5	43	Qualification for Finals series
4	Wellington Phoenix	27	12	4	11	34	32	+2	40	Qualification for Finals series
5	Sydney FC	27	10	8	9	37	42	−5	38	Qualification for Finals series
6	Melbourne Heart	27	9	10	8	35	34	+1	37	Qualification for Finals series
7	Newcastle Jets	27	10	5	12	38	41	−3	35	
8	Melbourne Victory	27	6	11	10	35	43	−8	29	
9	Adelaide United	27	5	10	12	26	44	−18	25	
10	Gold Coast United	27	4	9	14	30	42	−12	21	

Source: ultimatealeague.com
Rules for classification: 1) points; 2) goal difference; 3) number of goals scored.
(C) Champions

==== Results summary ====
Overall								Home						Away					
Pld	W	D	L	GF	GA	GD	Pts	W	D	L	GF	GA	GD	W	D	L	GF	GA	GD
27	4	9	14	29	42	−13	21	3	5	4	16	14	+2	1	4	10	13	28	−15

Last updated: 9 March 2012.
Source: See Results

==== Results ====
9 October 2011 1	Gold Coast United	1 – 1	Wellington Phoenix	Gold Coast
16:00 AEST (UTC+10)	Brown 88'	Summary	Greenacre 17'; Durante (yellow card) 84'; Ward (yellow card) 90'	Stadium: Skilled Park; Attendance: 4,113; Referee: Gerard Parsons

15 October 2011 2	Central Coast Mariners	1 – 1	Gold Coast United	Gosford
16:30 AEST (UTC+10)	Anderson (yellow card) 42'; Brown 47'; Macallister (yellow card) 63'; Beekmans (yellow card) 71'; Rožić (yellow card) 73'	Summary	Griffiths (yellow card) 35'; McGlinchey (yellow card) 48'; Zwaanswijk 87'	Stadium: Bluetongue Stadium; Attendance: 10,374; Referee: Peter O'Leary

21 October 2011 3	Brisbane Roar	3 – 0	Gold Coast United	Brisbane
19:30 AEST (UTC+10)	Paartalu 15'; Berisha 61'; Nichols 79'	Summary	Beekmans (yellow card) 16'; Macallister (yellow card) 52'; Traoré (yellow card) 74'	Stadium: Suncorp Stadium; Attendance: 13,425; Referee: Peter Green

30 October 2011 4	Gold Coast United	3 – 1	Newcastle Jets	Gold Coast
16:00 AEST (UTC+10)	Rigters 11'; Rees 59'; Brown 83'; Thwaite (yellow card) 87'	Summary	Wheelhouse 68'	Stadium: Skilled Park; Attendance: 2,974; Referee: Kris Griffiths-Jones

6 November 2011 5	Sydney	3 – 2	Gold Coast United	Sydney
16:00 AEST (UTC+10)	Bosschaart (yellow card) 20'; Cazarine 60'; Carle 63' (yellow card) 88'; McFlynn (yellow card) 66'; Emerton (yellow card) 80'; Kisel 90' (pen.)	Summary	Rees 22'; Macallister 46'; McGowan (yellow card) 81'; Beekmans (yellow card) 89'	Stadium: Sydney Football Stadium; Attendance: 11,051; Referee: Peter Green

11 November 2011 6	Adelaide United	2 – 1	Gold Coast United	Adelaide
19:00 AEST (UTC+10)	Cássio (yellow card) 5'; McKain (yellow card) 49'; Djite (yellow card) 56'; Caravella 58'; Ramsay 69'	Summary	Halloran (yellow card) 17'; Traoré (yellow card) 22'; Brown 67'	Stadium: Hindmarsh Stadium; Attendance: 6,368; Referee: Chris Beath

18 November 2011 7	Gold Coast United	1 – 2	Melbourne Heart	Gold Coast
19:00 AEST (UTC+10)	Jungschläger 62'; Mebrahtu (yellow card) 89'	Summary	Thompson 4' (yellow card) 90'; Worm (yellow card) 26'; Germano 68'	Stadium: Skilled Park; Attendance: 4,031; Referee: Peter O'Leary

27 November 2011 8	Melbourne Victory	3 – 2	Gold Coast United	Melbourne
16:00 AEST (UTC+10)	Kewell 3' (pen.); Hernández 23' (pen.), 79'; Broxham (yellow card) 31'; Vargas (red card) 34'; Cernak (yellow card) 62'; Celeski (yellow card) 81'	Summary	Beekmans (yellow card) 1'; Salley (yellow card) 22'; Traoré (yellow card) 29'; Macallister 45+4' (pen.); Jungschläger 47'; Rees (yellow card) 75'; Rigters (yellow card) 85'	Stadium: AAMI Park; Attendance: 16,522; Referee: Kris Griffiths-Jones

3 December 2011 9	Perth Glory	2 – 0	Gold Coast United	Perth
21:00 AEST (UTC+10)	McClenahan (yellow card) 14'; Sterjovski 20' (pen.); Miller (yellow card) 36' van den Brink (yellow card) 43'; Smeltz 54' (pen.)	Summary	Anderson (yellow card) 19' (yellow-red card) 62'; Salley (yellow card) 25'; Rees (yellow card) 77'	Stadium: nib Stadium; Attendance: 6,484; Referee: Strebre Delovski

11 December 2011 10	Gold Coast United	0 – 0	Sydney	Gold Coast
16:00 AEST (UTC+10)	J.Brown (yellow card) 82'; Halloran (yellow card) 87'	Summary	Coyne (yellow card) 18'; Cazarine (yellow card) 29'; Cole (yellow card) 34'; Bosschaart (yellow card) 45+2'; McFlynn (yellow card) 68'; Kisel (yellow card) 73'; Beauchamp (yellow card) 82'	Stadium: Skilled Park; Attendance: 2,984; Referee: Ben Williams

16 December 2011 11	Adelaide United	0 – 3	Gold Coast United	Adelaide
19:00 AEST (UTC+10)	McKain (yellow card) 34'; Dilevski (yellow card) 73'; Djite (yellow card) 84'	Summary	Halloran 19'; Rigters 37'; Macallister (yellow card) 42' (goal) 90+3'; Rožić (yellow card) 64' (yellow-red card) 76'; Thwaite (yellow card) 90'	Stadium: Hindmarsh Stadium; Attendance: 7,967; Referee: Ryan Shepheard

26 December 2011 12	Gold Coast United	1 – 0	Brisbane Roar	Gold Coast
18:30 AEST (UTC+10)	Brown (yellow card) 23'; Salley (yellow card) 41'; Beekmans (yellow card) 50'; McGowan (yellow card) 66'; Severino 88' (pen.) (yellow card) 88'; Harold (yellow card) 90+4'	Summary	Paartalu (yellow card) 24'; Adnan (yellow card) 45+1'; Theo (yellow card) 46'; Hingert (yellow card) 71'; Berisha (yellow card) 88'	Stadium: Skilled Park; Attendance: 6,927; Referee: Kris Griffiths-Jones

31 December 2011 13	Central Coast Mariners	0 – 0	Gold Coast United	Gosford
17:15 AEST (UTC+10)	Hutchinson (yellow card) 51'; Bojić (yellow card) 59'; Zwaanswijk (yellow card) 82'	Summary	Brown (yellow card) 70'; Salley (yellow card) 90+4'	Stadium: Bluetongue Stadium; Attendance: 14,388; Referee: Ryan Shepheard

4 January 2012 14	Newcastle Jets	3 – 2	Gold Coast United	Newcastle
16:30 AEST (UTC+10)	Pepper (yellow card) 22'; Brockie 44', 65'; Zadkovich (yellow card) 62'; Elrich (yellow card) 68'; Haliti 79'	Summary	Halloran 72'; Traoré 78'	Stadium: McDonald Jones Stadium; Attendance: 9,311; Referee: Gerard Parsons

8 January 2012 15	Gold Coast United	1 – 1	Melbourne Heart	Gold Coast
17:30 AEST (UTC+10)	Jungschläger (yellow card) 43'; Rigters 71'	Summary	Sarkies 9' (yellow card) 90+2'; Hamill (yellow card) 20'; Fred (yellow card) 24'	Stadium: Skilled Park; Attendance: 2,081; Referee: Matthew Gillett

15 January 2012 16	Gold Coast United	0 – 1	Wellington Phoenix	Gold Coast
17:30 AEST (UTC+10)	Rees (yellow card) 24'; Thwaite (yellow card) 73'	Summary	Brown (yellow card) 58' (goal) 88'; Ifill (yellow card) 86'	Stadium: Skilled Park; Attendance: 2,135; Referee: Kurt Ams

22 January 2012 17	Sydney	2 – 1	Gold Coast United	Sydney
16:00 AEST (UTC+10)	Emerton (yellow card) 64'; Kisel 71'; Grant (yellow card) 72'; Petratos (yellow card) 83'; Cazarine 89'	Summary	Halloran 55'	Stadium: Sydney Football Stadium; Attendance: 8,541; Referee: Strebre Delovski

1 February 2012 18	Melbourne Victory	1 – 1	Gold Coast United	Adelaide
18:30 AEST (UTC+10)	Kewell 66'; Leijer (yellow card) 73'; Fabinho (yellow card) 75'	Summary	Thwaite (yellow card) 61' (goal) 90+3'; Rees (yellow card) 65'; Adama Traoré (yellow card) 78'	Stadium: Coopers Stadium; Attendance: 5,268; Referee: Matthew Gillett

6 February 2012 19	Perth Glory	4 – 0	Gold Coast United	Perth
21:00 AEST (UTC+10)	McGarry 18'; Pantelidis (yellow card) 32'; Miller 53'; Heffernan (yellow card) 57'; Dodd 67'; Hughes (yellow card) 81'; Traoré 84' (o.g.)	Summary	Thwaite (yellow card) 55'; Halloran (yellow card) 88'	Stadium: nib Stadium; Attendance: 7,681; Referee: Alan Milliner

12 February 2012 20	Gold Coast United	1 – 2	Adelaide United	Gold Coast
16:30 AEST (UTC+10)	Boogaard 7' (o.g.); Thwaite (yellow card) 20'	Summary	Watson (yellow card) 17'; Levchenko (yellow card) 35'; Djite 42' (yellow card) 49'; Vidošić 59'	Stadium: Skilled Park; Attendance: 1,723; Referee: Chris Beath

17 February 2012 21	Melbourne Heart	1 – 0	Gold Coast United	Melbourne
19:00 AEST (UTC+10)	Hamill (yellow card) 5'; Marrone (yellow card) 45+1'; Reid (yellow card) 67'; Babalj 80'	Summary	Bowles (yellow card) 25'; Halloran (yellow card) 75'; Harold (yellow card) 84'	Stadium: AAMI Park; Attendance: 4,972; Referee: Alan Milliner

22 February 2012 22	Gold Coast United	3 – 3	Central Coast Mariners	Gold Coast
19:00 AEST (UTC+10)	Harold 10' (pen.); Halloran 17'; Cooper 56'; Thwaite (yellow card) 81'; Rigters (yellow card) 83'	Summary	Kwasnik 4', 66'; Griffiths (yellow card) 28'; Rose (yellow card) 45+1'; Ibini-Isei 59'; Bojić (yellow card) 75'	Stadium: Skilled Park; Attendance: 1,141; Referee: Matthew Gillett

25 February 2012 23	Gold Coast United	1 – 1	Melbourne Victory	Gold Coast
18:45 AEST (UTC+10)	Rigters 51' (yellow card) 78'; Barker-Daish (yellow card) 88'	Summary	Hernández 57'; Milligan (yellow card) 59'	Stadium: Skilled Park; Attendance: 2,109; Referee: Regis Queffelec

4 March 2012 24	Wellington Phoenix	2 – 0	Gold Coast United	Wellington
13:30 AEST (UTC+10)	Durante 29'; Smith (yellow card) 38'; Ward 90+3'	Summary		Stadium: Westpac Stadium; Attendance: 7,431; Referee: Kris Griffiths-Jones

9 March 2012 25	Newcastle Jets	1 – 1	Gold Coast United	Newcastle
19:00 AEST (UTC+10)	Jeffers (yellow card) 41'; Pepper (yellow card) 60'; Topor-Stanley 90+1'	Summary	Bowles 25'; McGowan (yellow card) 26'; Rigters (yellow card) 86'; Traoré (yellow card) 90'	Stadium: McDonald Jones Stadium; Attendance: 10,258; Referee: Ryan Shepheard

18 March 2012 26	Gold Coast United	3 – 0	Perth Glory	Gold Coast
17:30 AEST (UTC+10)	Anderson 7'; Bowles (yellow card) 80'; Brown 83', 90+3' (yellow card) 89'; Minniecon (yellow card) 84'	Summary	Pantelidis (yellow card) 24'; Heffernan (red card) 36'; O'Neill (yellow card) 90+2'	Stadium: Skilled Park; Attendance: 2,000; Referee: Kris Griffiths-Jones

25 March 2012 27	Gold Coast United	1 – 2	Brisbane Roar	Gold Coast
18:30 AEST (UTC+10)	Bowles 30'; Thwaite (yellow card) 77'	Summary	Fitzgerald 57' (yellow card) 68'; Lambadaridis 90'	Stadium: Skilled Park; Attendance: 6,102; Referee: Peter Green

== Squad statistics ==
As of match played 9 March 2012

=== Appearances and goals ===
No.	Pos	Nat	Player	Total		A-League	
No.	Pos	Nat	Player	Apps	Goals	Apps	Goals
1	GK	(New Zealand) NZL	Glen Moss	11	0	11	0
2	MF	(Australia) AUS	Joshua Brillante	12	0	9+3	0
3	DF	(Australia) AUS	Michael Thwaite	26	1	26	1
4	DF	(Australia) AUS	Zac Anderson	14	1	12+2	1
5	DF	(Australia) AUS	Kristian Rees	21	2	19+2	2
6	MF	(Netherlands) NED	Paul Beekmans	14	5	14	5
7	FW	(Australia) AUS	Golgol Mebrahtu	12	0	8+4	0
8	MF	(Brazil) BRA	Robson	4	0	3+1	0
9	FW	(Australia) AUS	Joel Porter	3	0	0+3	0
10	FW	(Australia) AUS	Tahj Minniecon	4	1	0+4	1
11	MF	(Australia) AUS	Jake Barker-Daish	7	1	4+3	1
12	FW	(Australia) AUS	Dylan Macallister	15	3	11+4	3
13	DF	(Croatia) CRO	Ante Rožić	11	0	10+1	0
14	MF	(Australia) AUS	Ben Halloran	21	4	20+1	4
15	DF	(Ivory Coast) CIV	Adama Traoré	27	1	27	1
16	FW	(Netherlands) NED	Maceo Rigters	22	4	19+3	4
17	FW	(Australia) AUS	Chris Harold	15	1	8+7	1
18	FW	(Australia) AUS	James Brown	17	6	16+1	6
20	GK	(Australia) AUS	Jerrad Tyson	14	0	13+1	0
21	MF	(Australia) AUS	Daniel Severino	12	1	0+12	1
22	MF	(Netherlands) NED	Peter Jungschläger	22	1	21+1	1
23	DF	(Australia) AUS	Dylan McGowan	18	0	14+4	0
24	MF	(Ivory Coast) CIV	Jonas Salley	12	4	12	4
27	DF	(Eritrea) ERI	Ambesager Yosief	3	0	0+3	0
28	DF	(Australia) AUS	Daniel Bowles	12	2	8+4	2
29	FW	(Australia) AUS	Mitch Bevan	7	0	3+4	0
31	MF	(Australia) AUS	Daniel Bragg	3	0	1+2	0
32	FW	(Australia) AUS	Chris Lucas	1	0	0+1	0
33	MF	(Australia) AUS	Mitch Cooper	6	0	5+1	0
40	GK	(Australia) AUS	Chris O'Connor	3	0	3	0
Players who left Gold Coast United during the season:

=== Goal scorers ===
Place	Position	Nation	Number	Name	A-League	Total
1	FW	(Australia)	18	James Brown	6	6
2	MF	(Australia)	14	Ben Halloran	4	4
2	FW	(Netherlands)	16	Maceo Rigters	4	4
4	FW	(Australia)	12	Dylan Macallister	3	3
5	DF	(Australia)	5	Kristian Rees	2	2
5	DF	(Australia)	28	Daniel Bowles	2	2
5	MF	(Netherlands)	22	Peter Jungschläger	2	2
8	DF	(Australia)	3	Michael Thwaite	1	1
8	DF	(Ivory Coast)	15	Adama Traoré	1	1
8	MF	(Australia)	33	Mitch Cooper	1	1
8	DF	(Australia)	4	Zac Anderson	1	1
8	MF	(Australia)	21	Daniel Severino	1	1
8	FW	(Australia)	17	Chris Harold	1	1
8				Own goal	1	1
Total					30	30

=== Disciplinary record ===
Position	Nation	Number	Name	A-League		Total	
Position	Nation	Number	Name	Yellow card	Red card	Yellow card	Red card
3	(Australia)	DF	Michael Thwaite	8	0	8	0
4	(Australia)	DF	Zac Anderson	3	1	3	1
5	(Australia)	DF	Kristian Rees	4	0	4	0
6	(Netherlands)	MF	Paul Beekmans	5	0	5	0
7	(Australia)	FW	Golgol Mebrahtu	1	0	1	0
10	(Australia)	FW	Tahj Minniecon	1	0	1	0
11	(Australia)	MF	Jake Barker-Daish	1	0	1	0
12	(Australia)	FW	Dylan Macallister	3	0	3	0
13	(Croatia)	DF	Ante Rožić	3	1	3	1
14	(Australia)	MF	Ben Halloran	4	0	4	0
15	(Ivory Coast)	DF	Adama Traoré	5	0	5	0
16	(Netherlands)	FW	Maceo Rigters	4	0	4	0
17	(Australia)	FW	Chris Harold	2	0	2	0
18	(Australia)	MF	James Brown	4	0	4	0
21	(Australia)	MF	Daniel Severino	1	0	1	0
22	(Netherlands)	MF	Peter Jungschläger	1	0	1	0
23	(Australia)	DF	Dylan McGowan	3	0	3	0
24	(Ivory Coast)	MF	Jonas Salley	4	0	4	0
28	(Australia)	DF	Daniel Bowles	2	0	2	0
Total				59	2	59	2
