= A-League transfers for 2011–12 season =

Soccer player transfers in Australia

This is a list of the transfers for the 2011–12 A-League season. It includes all transfers to an A-League club, but not all players leaving A-League clubs. Promotions from youth squads to the first squad of the same club are also not included.

Date	Name	Moving from	Moving to
20 October 2010	Isaka Cernak	North Queensland Fury	Melbourne Victory
29 November 2010	Justin Pasfield	North Queensland Fury	Central Coast Mariners
7 December 2010^{1}	Osama Malik	North Queensland Fury	Adelaide United
7 December 2010	Chris Payne	North Queensland Fury	Newcastle Jets
14 December 2010	Danny Vukovic	Wellington Phoenix	Perth Glory
18 December 2010	Evan Berger	Melbourne Victory	Perth Glory
29 December 2010	Adrian Zahra	(Australia) Melbourne Knights	Melbourne Heart
4 January 2011	Paul Izzo	(Australia) AIS Football Program	Adelaide United
13 January 2011	Zenon Caravella	Gold Coast United	Adelaide United
8 February 2011	Tando Velaphi	Perth Glory	Melbourne Victory
8 February 2011	(Slovakia) Karol Kisel	(Czech Republic) Slavia Prague	Sydney FC
10 February 2011	Matthew Jurman	Sydney FC	Brisbane Roar
11 February 2011	Dean Heffernan	Melbourne Heart	Perth Glory
17 February 2011	Troy Hearfield	Wellington Phoenix	Central Coast Mariners
22 February 2011	Jason Culina	Gold Coast United	Newcastle Jets
23 February 2011	Curtis Good	(Australia) AIS Football Program	Melbourne Heart
28 February 2011	Neil Young	Newcastle Jets	Perth Glory
28 February 2011	Mate Dugandzic	Melbourne Victory	Melbourne Heart
2 March 2011	Travis Dodd	Adelaide United	Perth Glory
11 March 2011	(New Zealand) Marco Rojas	Wellington Phoenix	Melbourne Victory
15 March 2011	Jake Barker-Daish	(Australia) AIS Football Program	Gold Coast United
18 March 2011	Jacob Melling	(Australia) AIS Football Program	Adelaide United
20 March 2011	(New Zealand) Shane Smeltz	Gold Coast United	Perth Glory
23 March 2011	Bruce Djite	Gold Coast United	Adelaide United
25 March 2011	Spase Dilevski	(Romania) FC U Craiova	Adelaide United
25 March 2011	(Costa Rica) Jean Carlos Solórzano	Brisbane Roar	Melbourne Victory
6 April 2011	(United States) Alex Smith	(Australia) Sydney Olympic	Gold Coast United
11 April 2011	(South Korea) Byun Sung-hwan	Sydney FC	Newcastle Jets
15 April 2011	Adriano Pellegrino	Perth Glory	Central Coast Mariners
15 April 2011	(Papua New Guinea) Brad McDonald	North Queensland Fury	Central Coast Mariners
20 April 2011	Michael Beauchamp	Melbourne Heart	Sydney FC
20 April 2011	Jamie Coyne	Perth Glory	Sydney FC
28 April 2011	Adam Hughes	Adelaide United	Perth Glory
29 April 2011	Jesse Makarounas	(Australia) AIS Football Program	Perth Glory
4 May 2011	Jimmy Downey	(Netherlands) Sparta Rotterdam	Wellington Phoenix
11 May 2011	(Brazil) Tiago Calvano	(Germany) Fortuna Düsseldorf	Newcastle Jets
15 May 2011	Lucas Pantelis	Adelaide United	Wellington Phoenix
3 June 2011	(Republic of Ireland) Liam Miller	(Scotland) Hibernian	Perth Glory
7 June 2011	(Netherlands) Bas van den Brink	(South Korea) Busan IPark	Perth Glory
8 June 2011	(Netherlands) Paul Beekmans	(Netherlands) Cambuur	Gold Coast United
13 June 2011^{2}	Dylan McGowan	(Scotland) Hearts	Gold Coast United
17 June 2011	(Netherlands) Pascal Bosschaart	(Netherlands) ADO Den Haag	Sydney FC
21 June 2011	(Brazil) Fred	(United States) D.C. United	Melbourne Heart
21 June 2011	David Williams	Unattached	Melbourne Heart
26 June 2011	(Argentina) Marcos Flores	Adelaide United	(China) Henan Construction
27 June 2011	Kofi Danning	Unattached	Brisbane Roar
1 July 2011	(Netherlands) Peter Jungschläger	(Netherlands) De Graafschap	Gold Coast United
3 July 2011	Daniel Severino	(Australia) Sydney Olympic	Gold Coast United
5 July 2011	Jack Hingert	(Australia) Dandenong Thunder	Brisbane Roar
6 July 2011	Dario Vidosic	(Germany) 1. FC Nürnberg	Adelaide United
16 July 2011	(New Zealand) Kosta Barbarouses	Brisbane Roar	(Russia) Alania Vladikavkaz
19 July 2011	Nikolas Tsattalios	(Australia) Sutherland Sharks	Wellington Phoenix
19 July 2011	(Brazil) Maycon	(Brazil) Nova Iguaçu	Melbourne Heart
22 July 2011	Jon McKain	(Saudi Arabia) Al-Nassr	Adelaide United
25 July 2011	Stuart Musialik	Unattached	Central Coast Mariners
25 July 2011	(Ukraine) Yevhen Levchenko	(Netherlands) Willem II	Adelaide United
3 August 2011	(Brazil) Andrezinho	(Japan) Consadole Sapporo	Perth Glory
11 August 2011	Matt McKay	Brisbane Roar	(Scotland) Rangers
16 August 2011	(Croatia) Ante Rožić	(Poland) Arka Gdynia	Gold Coast United
16 August 2011	(Bahrain) Sayed Mohamed Adnan	Unattached	Brisbane Roar
17 August 2011	(Albania) Besart Berisha	(Germany) Arminia Bielefeld	Brisbane Roar
17 August 2011	(Trinidad and Tobago) Tony Warner	(England) Tranmere Rovers	Wellington Phoenix
20 August 2011	Harry Kewell	Unattached	Melbourne Victory
25 August 2011	Brett Emerton	(England) Blackburn Rovers	Sydney FC
26 August 2011 ^{3}	(Eritrea) Samuel Tesfagabr	(Australia) Western Strikers	Gold Coast United
26 August 2011 ^{3}	(Eritrea) Ambesager Yosief	(Australia) Western Strikers	Gold Coast United
30 August 2011	Dylan Macallister	(Iceland) Breiðablik	Gold Coast United
30 August 2011	(Canada) Issey Nakajima-Farran	(Denmark) Horsens	Brisbane Roar
1 September 2011	(United States) Alex Smith	Gold Coast United	(Australia) Sydney Olympic
1 September 2011	(Netherlands) Maceo Rigters	Unattached	Gold Coast United
5 September 2011	(Argentina) Jonatan Germano	(Argentina) Estudiantes	Melbourne Heart
5 September 2011	(Spain) Dani Sánchez	Unattached	Wellington Phoenix
7 September 2011	(Republic of Ireland) Billy Mehmet	Unattached	Perth Glory
7 September 2011	Nikola Roganovic	(Australia) Green Gully	Melbourne Heart
15 September 2011	(Brazil) Fábio Alves	(Brazil) Volta Redonda	Melbourne Victory
15 September 2011	Lawrence Thomas	Unattached	Melbourne Victory
22 September 2011	(Portugal) Ricardo	(Australia) Adelaide City	Adelaide United
26 September 2011	Antony Golec	Sydney FC	Adelaide United
28 September 2011	Milan Susak	(Indonesia) Minangkabau	Adelaide United
30 September 2011	Brent Griffiths	Unattached	Wellington Phoenix
3 October 2011	Nick Ward	(Greece) Iraklis	Wellington Phoenix
4 October 2011	Ante Covic	(Sweden) Elfsborg	Melbourne Victory
6 October 2011	(New Zealand) Cameron Lindsay	(England) Blackburn Rovers	Wellington Phoenix
14 October 2011	Steve Pantelidis	(Indonesia) Bintang Medan	Perth Glory
20 October 2011	(England) Francis Jeffers	Unattached	Newcastle Jets
28 October 2011	(United States) Alex Smith	(Australia) Sydney Olympic	Wellington Phoenix
2 November 2011^{4}	Adrian Madaschi	Unattached	Melbourne Heart
7 November 2011	(England) Michael Bridges	Unattached	Newcastle Jets
22 November 2011^{4}	(Ivory Coast) Jonas Salley	(China) Chengdu Blades	Gold Coast United
23 December 2011	Chris O'Connor	Unattached	Gold Coast United
30 December 2011	Matt Simon	Central Coast Mariners	(South Korea) Chunnam Dragons
3 January 2012^{4}	Dean Heffernan	(China) Liaoning Whowin	Perth Glory
4 January 2012	Tom Rogić	(England) Nike Academy	Central Coast Mariners
19 January 2012^{4}	Paul Reid	Unattached	Melbourne Heart
24 January 2012	Julius Davies	(Germany) Bayern Munich Junior Team	Melbourne Victory
24 January 2012^{5}	Mark Milligan	(Japan) JEF United Chiba	Melbourne Victory
2 February 2012	Anthony Proia	(Australia) AIS Football Program	Brisbane Roar
3 February 2012^{6}	(England) John Sutton	(Scotland) Hearts	Central Coast Mariners
8 February 2012^{7}	(Spain) Ubay Luzardo	(Hong Kong) Kitchee	Melbourne Victory
11 February 2012	Milan Susak	Adelaide United	(China) Tianjin Teda
17 February 2012	(Ivory Coast) Jonas Salley	Gold Coast United	(China) Nanchang Hengyuan
28 February 2012	Mile Sterjovski	Perth Glory	(China) Dalian Aerbin
29 February 2012	Rostyn Griffiths	Central Coast Mariners	(China) Guangzhou R&F
29 February 2012	Iain Fyfe	(South Korea) Busan IPark	Adelaide United
2 March 2012	Adam Hughes	Perth Glory	(China) Harbin Yiteng

^{1} Adelaide United approached North Queensland Fury asking for an early release which was granted allowing the player to play for his new club for the remainder of the 2010–11 Season
^{2} McGowan is on loan from Heart of Midlothian for the 2011–12 A-League season
^{3} Ambesager Yosief & Samuel Tesfagabr are both non-visa foreign quoted players, as they both possess Australian citizenship
^{4} Short-term injury replacement contract
^{5} Milligan is on loan from Jeju United until the end of the 2011–12 A-League season
^{6} Sutton is on loan from Heart of Midlothian for four months
^{7} Luzardo is on loan from Kitchee until the end of the 2011–12 A-League season
