= Zac Anderson =

Australian professional football player (born 1991)

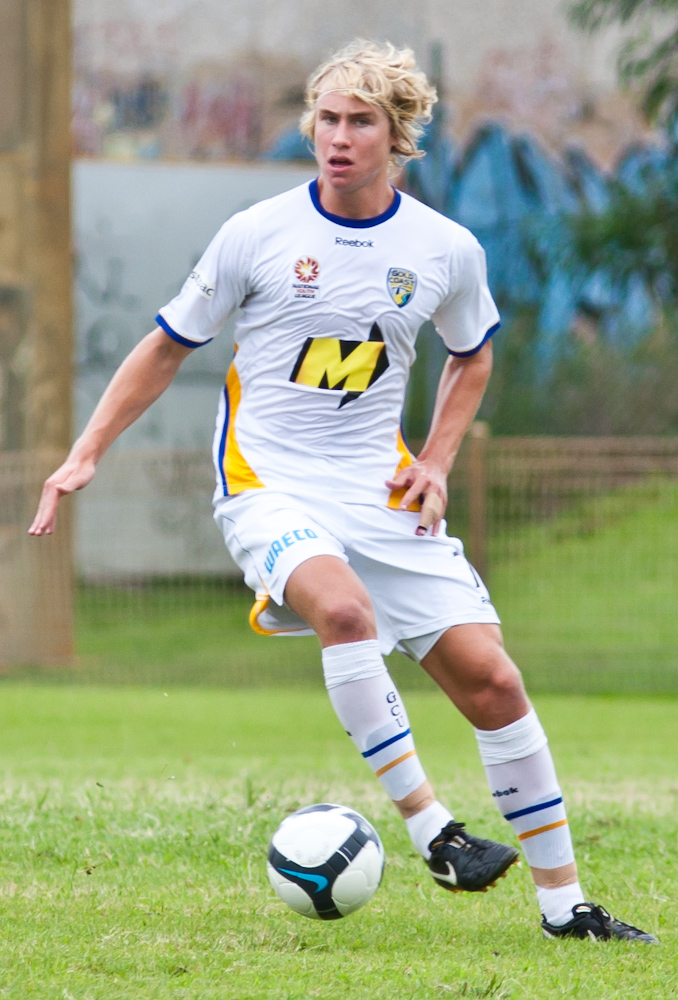

Personal information
- Full name: Zachary Michael Anderson
- Date of birth: 30 April 1991 (age 35)
- Place of birth: Ayr, Queensland, Australia
- Height: 1.91 m (6 ft 3 in)
- Position: Central defender

Youth career
- Brisbane City
- 2006–2008: QAS
- 2009–2010: Gold Coast United FC

Senior career*
Years	Team	Apps	(Gls)
2009–2012	Gold Coast United FC	17	(1)
2012–2015	Central Coast Mariners	67	(1)
2015–2016	Sydney FC	4	(0)
2016	Emirates Club	2	(0)
2017	Kedah	17	(1)
2018	PKNS	20	(1)
2019	Perak	10	(0)
2020	Hougang United	14	(1)
2021	Olympic FC	28	(5)
Total		179	(10)

International career^{‡}
2009	Australia U-20	2	(0)
2012	Australia U-23	1	(0)
- * Club domestic league appearances and goals as of 11 November 2021 ‡ National team caps and goals as of 11:57, 13 April 2017 (UTC)

Zachary Michael Anderson (born 30 April 1991) is a retired Australian professional football player who played as a centre back. He currently works for the Brisbane Roar FC as their Chief Operating Officer.

Born in Queensland, Anderson made his professional debut with Gold Coast United FC in 2009 before joining the Mariners in 2012, and then Sydney FC in 2015. He moved to the UAE in 2016 to play for Emirates Club, before moving to Malaysia six months later.

He has played for the Australian U-20 and U-23 sides.

== Club career ==
=== Gold Coast United ===
On 20 November 2009, Anderson made his senior debut for Gold Coast United FC in the starting 11, in a 1–1 draw against Adelaide United. He scored his first goal for the club in a win over Perth Glory on 18 March 2012.

=== Central Coast Mariners ===
On 15 May 2012 he signed a deal with the Central Coast Mariners for the upcoming A-League season. Anderson, along with six teammates was released from his contract with the Mariners at the end of 2014–15 A-League season.

=== Sydney FC ===
On 14 July 2015 Zachary signed a one-year deal with Sydney FC for the 2015-16 A-League season, rejoining former manager Graham Arnold, coaches Andrew Clark and John Crawley and former teammate Matt Simon who was also released from the Mariners at the conclusion 2015–16 season. He made his competitive debut for Sydney in a loss to Urawa Red Diamonds in the 2016 AFC Champions League. In late May 2016, it was announced that Anderson would not be returning to the club after the 2015–16 season.

=== Emirates Club ===
In June 2016, Anderson was announced as a new signing for UAE Arabian Gulf League side Emirates Club, signing a two-year deal. He was released from his contract after 6 months at the club, playing only 4 games and conceding 10 goals.

=== Kedah FA ===
Anderson moved to Malaysian Super League side Kedah FA in early 2017, following the footsteps of Sydney FC teammate Shane Smeltz who joined in 2016. He was able to help the club to a 4th place league finish as well as winning the Malaysian FA Cup. On 16 September 2017, Anderson announced on his Instagram that he would be leaving the club alongside striker Ken Ilsø to pursue other opportunities.

=== Perak TBG F.C. ===
After a stint with PKNS FC, it was announced on 26 December 2018 that Anderson had signed for Perak TBG F.C.

=== Hougang United ===
On 28 January 2020, Anderson joined Singapore Premier League side Hougang United FC for the 2020 season.

=== Olympic FC ===
In March 2022, Olympic FC announced that Anderson had retired from football to focus on his business, First Eleven Club.

== International career ==
On 7 March 2012 he was selected to represent the Australia Olympic football team in an Asian Olympic Qualifier match against Iraq.

== Career statistics ==
As of 3 October 2021

Club	Season	League			Cup		League Cup		Continental		Total	
Club	Season	Division	Apps	Goals	Apps	Goals	Apps	Goals	Apps	Goals	Apps	Goals
Gold Coast United FC	2009–10	A-League	3	0	0	0	–		0	0	3	0
Gold Coast United FC	2010–11	A-League	2	0	0	0	–		0	0	2	0
Gold Coast United FC	2011–12	A-League	12	1	0	0	–		0	0	12	1
Gold Coast United FC	Total		17	1	0	0	0	0	0	0	17	1
Central Coast Mariners	2012–13	A-League	23	0	0	0	–		5	0	28	0
Central Coast Mariners	2013–14	A-League	22	1	0	0	–		6	0	28	1
Central Coast Mariners	2014–15	A-League	22	0	4	0	–		0	0	26	0
Central Coast Mariners	Total		67	1	4	0	0	0	11	0	82	1
Sydney	2015–16	A-League	4	0	0	0	–		5	0	9	0
Emirates Club	2016–17	UAE Arabian Gulf League	2	0	1	0	–		0	0	3	0
Kedah	2017	Malaysian Super League	17	1	5	1	9	0	–		31	2
PKNS	2018	Malaysian Super League	20	1	1	0	8	0	–		29	1
Perak FA	2019	Malaysian Super League	10	0	4	0	0	0	1	0	15	0
Hougang United	2020	Singapore Premier League	10	1	1	0	–		3	0	14	1
Olympic FC	2021	National Premier Leagues	23	5	3	0	–		0	0	0	0
Career total			168	10	19	1	17	0	20	0	224	11

== Honours ==
=== Club ===
Gold Coast United FC

- National Youth League Championship: 2009–10

Central Coast Mariners

- A-League Championship: 2012–13

Kedah FA

- Sultan Haji Ahmad Shah Cup: 2017
- Malaysia FA Cup: 2017

== See also ==
- List of Central Coast Mariners FC players
- List of Gold Coast United FC players
