= Mitch Cooper =

Ni-Vanuatu footballer (born 1994)

Personal information
- Full name: Mitch Steven Baggio Cooper
- Date of birth: 18 September 1994 (age 32)
- Place of birth: Port Vila, Vanuatu
- Height: 1.65 m (5 ft 5 in)
- Position: Attacking midfielder

Team information
- Current team: Bayside Argonauts
- Number: 14

Youth career
- 2010–2012: Gold Coast United
- 2011: QAS

Senior career*
Years	Team	Apps	(Gls)
2012	Gold Coast United	6	(1)
2012–2017	Newcastle Jets	33	(1)
2012	Newcastle Jets NPL	5	(0)
2017–2018	Nunawading City	27	(18)
2018–2019	Green Gully	17	(1)
2019–2020	Hume City	23	(6)
2020	Sunshine Coast Wanderers	15	(4)
2021–2023	Hume City	47	(6)
2023–	Bayside Argonauts	75	(50)

International career^{‡}
2011	Australia U-17	4	(0)
2012	Australia U-20	7	(0)
2019–	Vanuatu	10	(6)
- * Club domestic league appearances and goals as of 22 August 2026 ‡ National team caps and goals as of 12 October 2024

Mitch Steven Baggio Cooper (born 18 September 1994) is a Ni-Vanuatu footballer who plays for Bayside Argonauts in the Victorian Premier League 2.

== Early life ==
Cooper was born in Port Vila, Vanuatu, and lived there until age eight, attending the Port Vila International School. He then lived in New Zealand for five years before moving to Australia.

== Club career ==
=== Gold Coast United ===
Cooper was called up to the senior squad of A-League club Gold Coast United in February 2012, aged seventeen. With regular captain Michael Thwaite suspended, club owner Clive Palmer named Cooper captain for the match against Melbourne Heart as a sign of the club's commitment to promoting young players. Coach Miron Bleiberg subsequently described the move as a symbolic one, claiming that more experienced players would effectively lead the side on the field. Palmer suspended Bleiberg from his role as a result of those comments, replacing him with assistant coach Mike Mulvey for the Heart match. Gold Coast lost the game 1–0 to a late goal from Eli Babalj. Bleiberg quit the club days later, saying that Palmer's actions had hurt his dignity.

In Gold Coast's next game, Cooper scored his first goal for the club, the side's third in a 3–3 draw with Central Coast Mariners. He described this as a "dream" start, saying that he had previously been focused on the National Youth League and that he had tried to ignore the controversy surrounding his debut captaincy. Gold Coast United lost its A-League operating licence the following week. The loss of the license caused the FFA to scramble for a replacement team, resulting in the creation of the Western Sydney Wanderers FC.

=== Newcastle Jets ===
On 25 May 2012, Cooper signed a two-year contract with the Newcastle Jets. He cited his respect for Jets coach Gary van Egmond, who he knew from his time in the Australia U-17s as a significant factor in this choice. Cooper suffered an anterior cruciate ligament injury to his right knee in the Jets' final game of the 2012–13 season, ruling him out for several months. He signed a one-year extension with the Jets in June 2013. Soon after returning to the field, he suffered a second ACL injury, this time to his left knee in a National Youth League game against Western Sydney Wanderers in January 2014. He returned to play in the Jets squad in December 2014.

In March 2015, Cooper signed a further two-year deal with the Jets. He scored his first goal for the club on 12 February 2016 with a header in a draw with Brisbane Roar.

Cooper was one of three senior players omitted from the Jets squad for a pre-season tour of China in August 2016, with coach Scott Miller talking of moving some players out of the club. However, Miller himself was fired in the next month, which Jets CEO Lawrie McKinna described as giving the players a fresh chance with a new coach.

=== Nunawading City ===
Cooper signed for NPL Victoria 2 side Nunawading City for the 2017 season. Mitch scored his first goal for Nunawading against the Goulburn Valley Suns in Round 2 of the NPL2 East season; before scoring a header in a 5–2 win over Richmond SC.

Throughout the remainder of the season, Cooper scored 18 leagues goals (with 3 in the cup) totalling in 21 goals for the season, he'd be in the top 10 players for the Victorian NPL2 gold medal awards alongside former Newcastle Jets & Gold Coast United team-mate James Brown. He'd score 3 hat-tricks against the Casey Comets, Bendigo City & Melbourne City Youth.

== International career ==
Cooper has represented the Australia national under-17 association football team including four matches at the 2011 FIFA U-17 World Cup. In March 2019, he was called up for Vanuatu national football team for the first time.

== Career statistics ==
=== Club ===
As of 28 April 2017

Appearances and goals by club, season and competition
Club	Season	League			Cup		Continental		Total	
Club	Season	Division	Apps	Goals	Apps	Goals	Apps	Goals	Apps	Goals
Gold Coast United	2011–12	A-League	6	1	0	0	0	0	6	1
Newcastle Jets Youth	2012	Northern NSW State Football League	5	0	0	0	0	0	5	0
Newcastle Jets	2012–13	A-League	5	0	0	0	0	0	5	0
Newcastle Jets	2013–14	A-League	0	0	0	0	0	0	0	0
Newcastle Jets	2014–15	A-League	16	0	0	0	0	0	16	0
Newcastle Jets	2015–16	A-League	12	1	1	0	0	0	13	1
Newcastle Jets	2016–17	A-League	0	0	0	0	0	0	0	0
Newcastle Jets	Newcastle Jets total		33	1	1	0	0	0	34	1
Nunawading City	2017	National Premier Leagues Victoria 2	23	18	2	3	0	0	25	21
Total			66	9	2	3	0	0	68	23

=== International goals ===
Scores and results list Vanuatu's goal tally first.

No.	Date	Venue	Opponent	Score	Result	Competition
1.	15 July 2019	National Soccer Stadium, Apia, Samoa	Tonga	5–0	14–0	2019 Pacific Games
2.	18 July 2019	National Soccer Stadium, Apia, Samoa	Samoa	1–0	11–0	2019 Pacific Games
3.	18 July 2019	National Soccer Stadium, Apia, Samoa	Samoa	2–0	11–0	2019 Pacific Games
4.	18 July 2019	National Soccer Stadium, Apia, Samoa	Samoa	3–0	11–0	2019 Pacific Games
5.	18 July 2019	National Soccer Stadium, Apia, Samoa	Samoa	4–0	11–0	2019 Pacific Games
6.	12 October 2024	Freshwater Stadium, Port Vila, Vanuatu	Samoa	1–0	4–1	2026 FIFA World Cup qualification
