= Igralište Batarija =

Football stadium in Trogir, Croatia

Coordinates: 43°30′57″N 16°14′49″E

Batarija is a football stadium located in Trogir, Croatia.

== History ==
Igralište Batarija is the home stadium of Croatian side HNK Trogir.

Igralište Batarija has received international media attention because the stadium is located on an island adjacent to Kamerlengo Castle and St. Marco, part of the Trogir World Heritage Site.

In 2019, HNK Trogir was granted funds to renovate Igralište Batarija.

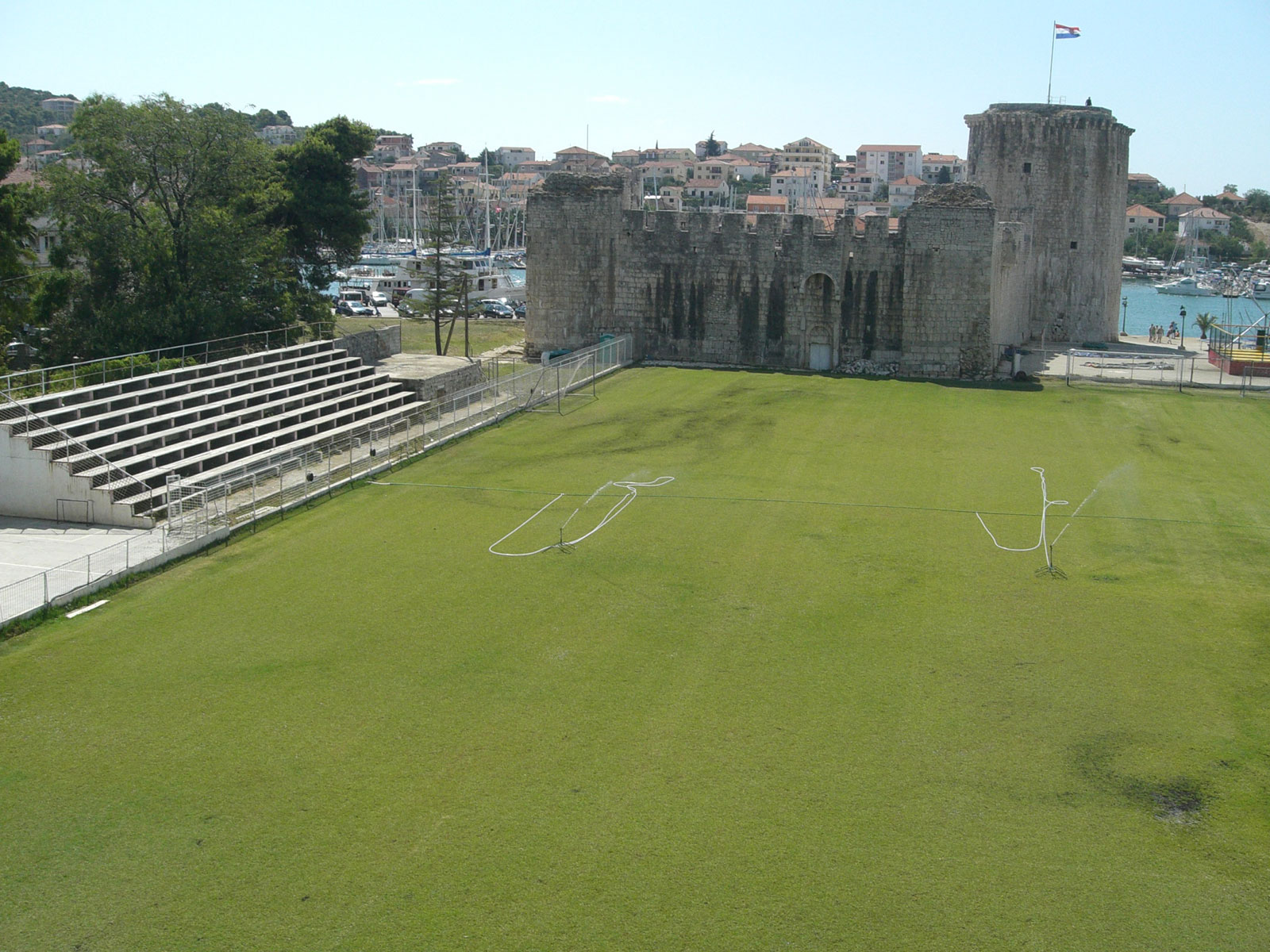
Kamerlengo Castle and Batarija

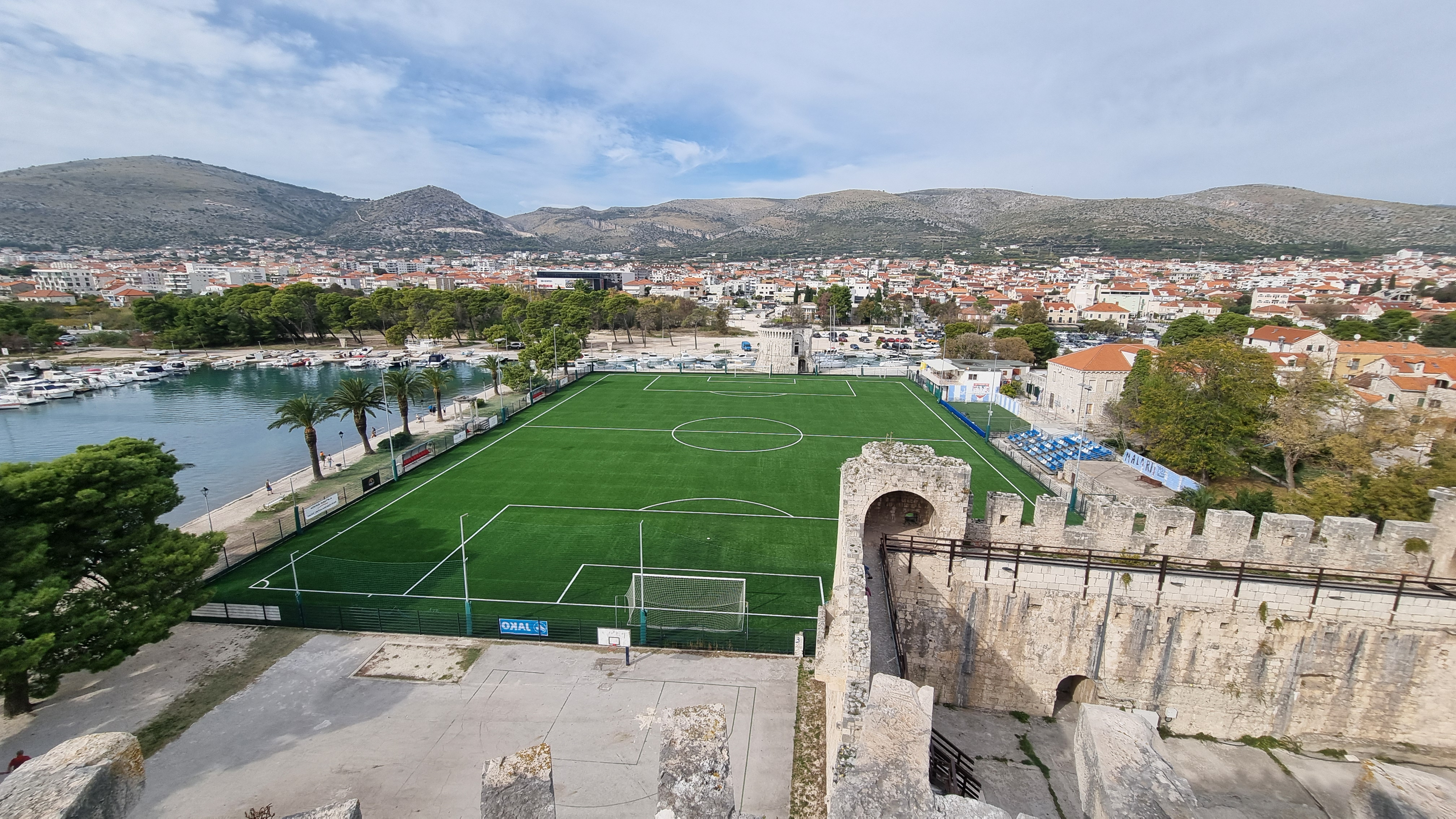
Igralište Batarija football ground, from Kamerlengo Castle

== Usage ==
Igraliste Batarija has been used by HNK Trogir and it's free to use for the general public.
