= Chris Harold =

Australian soccer player

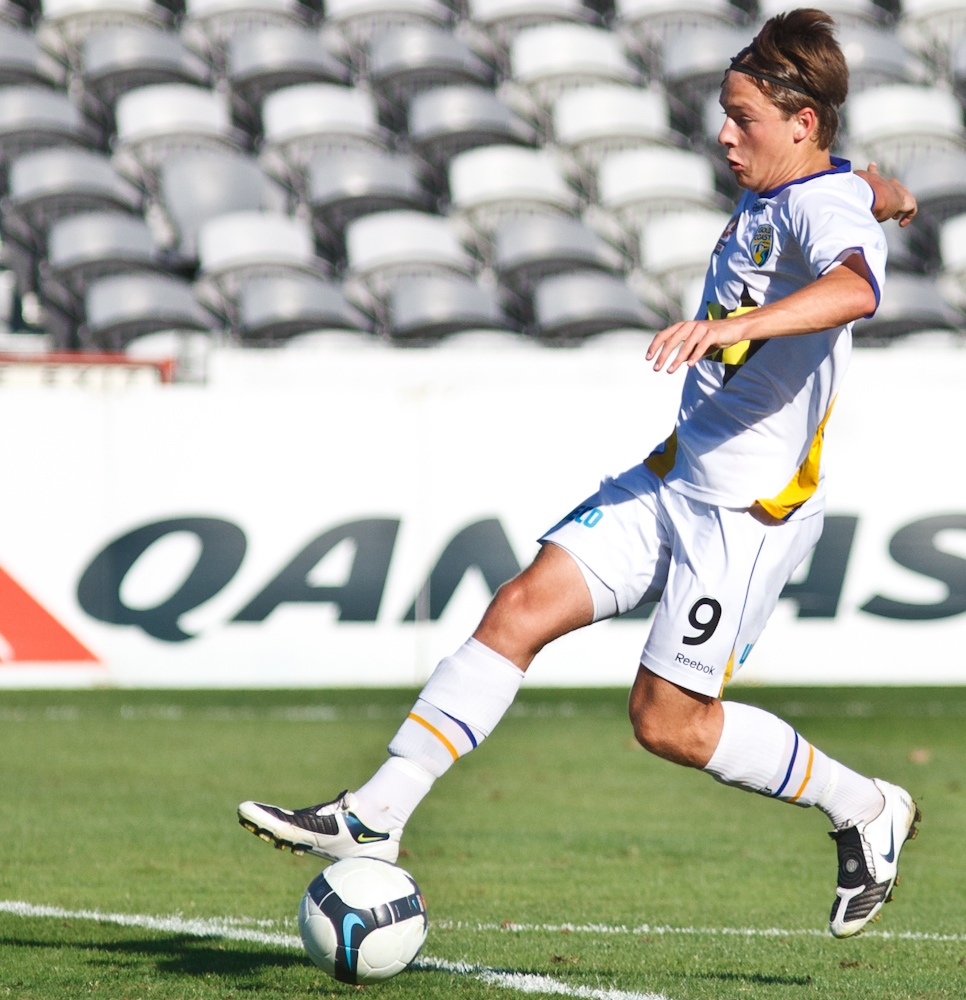
- Harold playing for Gold Coast United Youth in 2010

Personal information
- Full name: Christopher Daniel Harold
- Date of birth: 14 July 1992 (age 34)
- Place of birth: Perth, Western Australia
- Height: 1.76 m (5 ft 9 1/2 in)
- Position: Winger

Youth career
- Brisbane Wolves
- Brisbane Force
- 2009–2010: Gold Coast United

Senior career*
Years	Team	Apps	(Gls)
2010–2012	Gold Coast United	25	(2)
2012–2020	Perth Glory	143	(21)
2020	Central Coast Mariners	7	(2)
2021–2022	ECU Joondalup	11	(2)

International career^{‡}
2010	Australia U-20	1	(0)
2012	Australia U-23	1	(0)
- * Club domestic league appearances and goals as of 3 October 2021 ‡ National team caps and goals as of 23 December 2010

Christopher Daniel Harold (born 14 July 1992) is an Australian former professional soccer player who last played as a forward for National Premier Leagues club ECU Joondalup.

Born in Perth, Western Australia, Harold started his professional career with Gold Coast United in 2010 after coming through the club's youth team. He returned to Perth to play for Perth Glory in 2012 following the dissolution of Gold Coast United. In January 2020, he joined Central Coast Mariners.

Harold featured twice for Australian youth national sides.

== Club career ==
Originally from Perth, Harold spent most of his childhood in Singapore and Malaysia. In 2009, Harold trained for two weeks at the Manchester United Academy.

Harold made his first senior debut Gold Coast United on 26 September 2010. He came on as a 77th-minute substitute for Steve Fitzsimmons in the 1–1 draw with Sydney FC at the Sydney Football Stadium.

In 2012 Harold returned to Perth to sign with Perth Glory.

After 8 years with Perth Glory, Harold departed in January 2020 to join Central Coast Mariners on a short-term contract. In July 2020, following the suspension of the 2019–20 A-League due to the COVID-19 pandemic, the Mariners announced that Harold would not be rejoining the squad for the final four games of the season for personal reasons. In October 2020, Harold retired from professional football aged 28, citing frustration and feeling disenfranchised with the A-League and the sport in Australia.

Harold joined former Glory coach Kenny Lowe at ECU Joondalup in the National Premier Leagues.

== International career ==
Harold was selected to tour to South America with the Australian Young Socceroos in March 2010.

On 7 March 2011 he was selected to represent the Australia Olympic football team in an Asian Olympic Qualifier match against Iraq.

== After football ==
Harold has a law degree and joined a law firm in Perth following his retirement from football. As of 2021, he remains Perth Glory's record A-League appearances holder. In 2023 Harold was nominated and elected to the Football West board of directors. In November 2026, he became its Chair.

== Career statistics ==
Appearances and goals by club, season and competition
Club	Season	League			Cup		Continental		Total	
Club	Season	Division	Apps	Goals	Apps	Goals	Apps	Goals	Apps	Goals
Gold Coast United	2010–11	A-League	10	1	0	0	0	0	10	1
Gold Coast United	2011–12	A-League	15	1	0	0	0	0	15	1
Gold Coast United	Gold Coast total		25	2	0	0	0	0	25	2
Perth Glory	2012–13	A-League	22	3	0	0	0	0	22	3
Perth Glory	2013–14	A-League	23	3	0	0	0	0	23	3
Perth Glory	2014–15	A-League	17	3	2	1	0	0	19	4
Perth Glory	2015–16	A-League	25	7	4	2	0	0	29	9
Perth Glory	2016–17	A-League	28	3	2	0	0	0	30	3
Perth Glory	2017–18	A-League	24	2	1	0	0	0	25	2
Perth Glory	2018–19	A-League	1	0	0	0	0	0	1	0
Perth Glory	2019–20	A-League	3	0	1	0	0	0	4	0
Perth Glory	Perth total		143	21	10	3	0	0	153	24
Central Coast Mariners	2019–20	A-League	7	2	0	0	0	0	7	2
ECU Joondalup	2021	National Premier Leagues WA	11	2	5	1	0	0	16	3
Career total			186	27	15	4	0	0	201	31

== Honours ==
=== Club ===
Gold Coast United:

- National Youth League Championship: 2009–2010

Perth Glory

- A-League Premiership: 2018–19

== See also ==
- List of Central Coast Mariners FC players
- List of Gold Coast United FC players
- List of Perth Glory FC players
