= Jess Vanstrattan =

Australian soccer player and coach (born 1982)

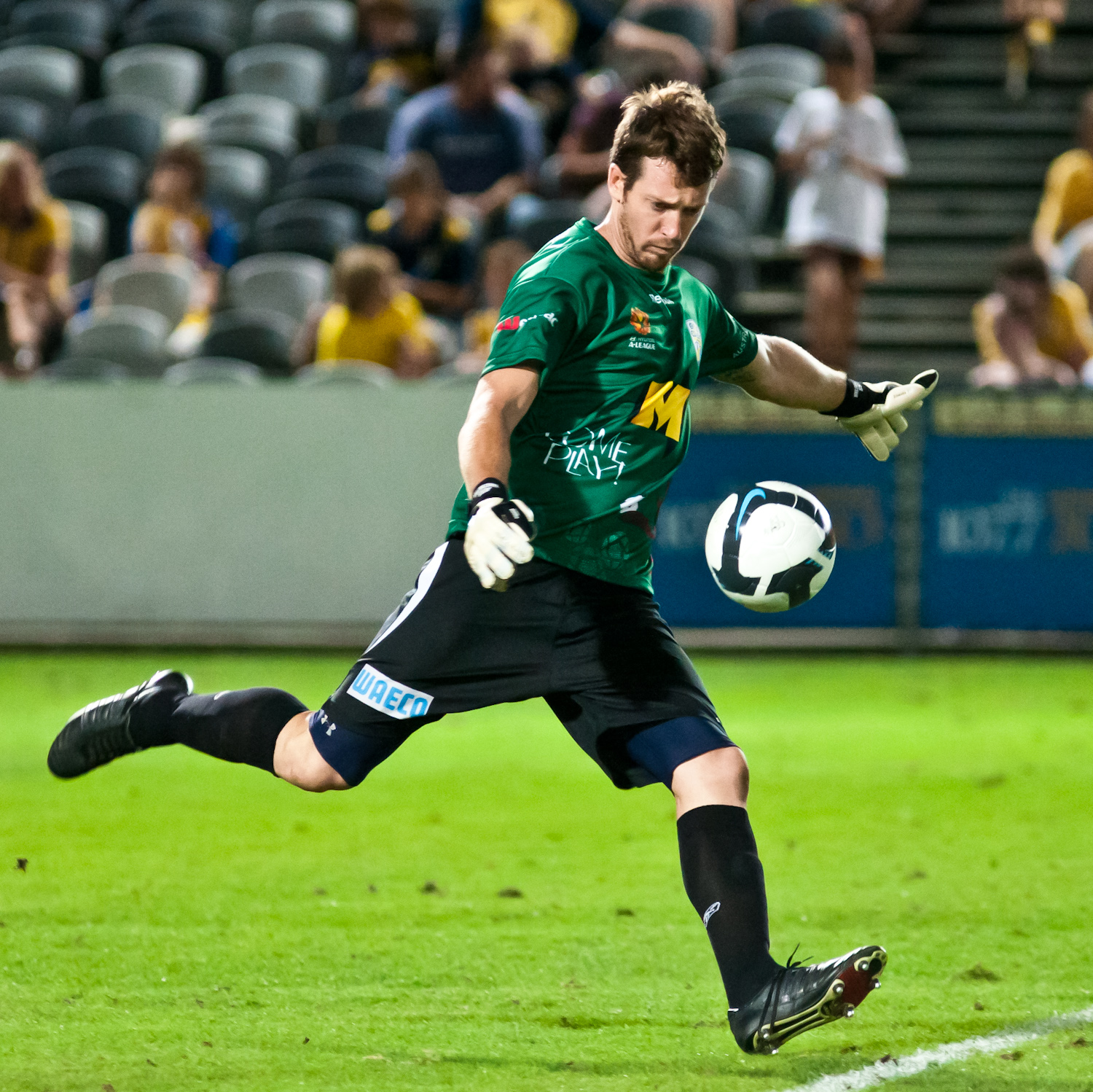
- Vanstrattan playing for Gold Coast United in 2009

Personal information
- Full name: Jess Kedwell Vanstrattan
- Date of birth: 19 July 1982 (age 44)
- Place of birth: Gosford, Australia
- Height: 1.91 m (6 ft 3 in)
- Position: Goalkeeper

Team information
- Current team: Newcastle Jets FC (Goalkeeping Coach)

Senior career*
Years	Team	Apps	(Gls)
1998	Central Coast	1	(0)
1999–2001	Northern Spirit	3	(0)
2001–2008	Hellas Verona	8	(0)
2003–2004	→ Carrarese (loan)	1	(0)
2007	→ Ancona (loan)	1	(0)
2007–2008	→ Juventus (loan)	0	(0)
2008–2010	Gold Coast United	18	(0)
2010–2011	Central Coast Mariners	3	(0)
2015	Newcastle Jets	0	(0)
Total		35	(0)

International career^{‡}
1999	Australia U-17	14	(0)
2001	Australia U-20	7	(0)

Managerial career
- 2014: Central Coast Mariners Academy (goalkeeping coach)
- 2015–2017: Newcastle Jets (goalkeeping coach)
- 2017–2018: Melbourne City (goalkeeping coach)
- 2018–2019: Melbourne Victory (goalkeeping coach)
- 2019–2020: Central Coast Mariners (goalkeeping coach)
- 2021–: Western Sydney Wanderers (goalkeeping coach)
Medal record
Representing Australia
Men's Association football
FIFA U-17 World Championship
Runner-up	1999 New Zealand
OFC U-19 Men's Championship
Winner	2001 Cook Islands/New Caledonia
- * Club domestic league appearances and goals as of 11 May 2011 ‡ National team caps and goals as of 20 June 2019

Jess Kedwell Vanstrattan (born 19 July 1982) is a retired Australian professional footballer who played as a goalkeeper.

Vanstrattan was born in Gosford and started his senior career with Central Coast. He played the majority of his career in Italy before returning to Australia to play in the A-League for Gold Coast United, Central Coast Mariners and Newcastle Jets.

== Early life ==
Vanstrattan was born in Gosford, New South Wales.

== Playing career ==
=== Club ===
Vanstrattan started his career for Central Coast and then Northern Spirit in Sydney. At just 17 he made his 1st grade debut for the Spirit, playing the last 3 games of the season for the National Soccer League club.

==== Verona ====
In the summer of 2001, he was signed by Juventus on a 5-year deal and loaned to Verona in a co-ownership deal for 500 million lire. At Verona, aged 19, Vanstrattan was a regular on the bench for the Serie A side and played 54 games in 2 years for the reserve team (Campionato Nazionale Primavera).

In his third season, Verona assistant Marco Baroni, ex defender of the Scudetto winning Napoli side of Diego Maradona was signed as head coach of Carrarese Calcio and signed Vanstrattan (on loan) immediately in the 2003–04 season, where he made his first team debut in Italy. However, in the first game of that season Vanstrattan suffered a serious knee injury rupturing his right knee ACL and missed the remainder of the season.

In January 2004, his loan was ended and Vanstrattan returned to Verona where he signed a 4-year contract extension . In June 2004, the co-ownership deal was terminated and Verona received full registration rights.

==== Juventus ====
Vanstrattan was involved in a controversial transfer saga in the summer of 2007. After ending his contract with Verona by mutual agreement (due to expire in 2008), Jess returned home to Australia in June, criticising Verona for several years of not fulfilling promises made. He signed for Juventus a month later. Vanstrattan played pre-season games for the Old Lady, becoming the first Australian to turn out for the club. However, in early August 2007, the Lega Calcio ruled that the goalkeeper's contract at Juventus was illegal after Verona (as found in a court hearing) falsified documents including the falsification of Vanstrattan's signature in an attempt to block the transfer of the player to Juventus and the transfer was to be cancelled until courts could decide an outcome.

Vanstrattan needed to return to Verona officially under contract again, although only for four days, within which time the courts found Verona guilty. The club was ordered to agree on a loan deal which saw the player return to Juventus on 21 August, in time for the 2007–08 Serie A season.

Vanstrattan played for Juventus in China, Hong Kong and Australia in friendly matches.

In June 2008, Vanstrattan did not agree to a three-year contract extension with Juventus and was released by both Verona and Juve.

==== Gold Coast United ====
On 7 October 2008, Vanstrattan became the first signing for Gold Coast United after being released by Juventus in June.

On 3 August 2009 he succumbed to an ankle injury sustained while training in preparation for the first game of the 2009–10 A-League season. He was sidelined for several weeks but recovered to play the rest of the season, and after a slow start was able to put in several man of the match performances.

==== Central Coast Mariners ====
On 19 July 2010, Vantstrattan was signed by the Central Coast Mariners after he wanted to move back home. Central Coast had recently lost first choice goal keeper Danny Vukovic to Turkish club Konyaspor. Unfortunately, 3 games after signing with the club, Vanstrattan suffered a second ACL rupture and missed the duration of the season. On 14 April 2011 Vanstrattan was released by the Mariners.

=== International ===
Vanstrattan played a number of games for the Australia U-17 team in 1999. This included winning the OFC U-17 Championship and playing in the 1999 FIFA U-17 World Championship, where The Joeys finished second.

In 2001, Vanstrattan played in the Australia U-20 side which won the 2001 OFC U-20 Championship, and went on to participate in the 2001 FIFA World Youth Championship.

Vanstrattan went on to represent Australia U-23 in two friendlies against club sides in Germany.

== Management career ==
In 2014, Vanstrattan became the goalkeeping coach for Central Coast Mariners Academy. The academy was eventually dissolved in 2014. In 2015, Vanstrattan became the goalkeeping coach for Newcastle Jets

== Career statistics ==
Club	Season	League			Cup		Continental		Total	
Club	Season	Division	Apps	Goals	Apps	Goals	Apps	Goals	Apps	Goals
Central Coast	1998	NSW Super League	1	0	0	0	0	0	1	0
Northern Spirit	1999–2000	National Soccer League	3	0	0	0	0	0	3	0
Verona	2000–01	Serie A	0	0	0	0	0	0	0	0
Verona	2001–02	Serie A	0	0	0	0	0	0	0	0
Verona	2002–03	Serie B	0	0	0	0	0	0	0	0
Verona	2004–05	Serie B	5	0	1	0	0	0	6	0
Verona	2005–06	Serie B	3	0	0	0	0	0	3	0
Verona	2006–07	Serie B	0	0	0	0	0	0	0	0
Verona	Verona total		8	0	1	0	0	0	9	0
Carrarese (loan)	2003–04	Serie C2	1	0	0	0	0	0	1	0
Ancona (loan)	2006–07	Serie C1	1	0	0	0	0	0	1	0
Juventus (loan)	2007–08	Serie A	0	0	0	0	0	0	0	0
Gold Coast United	2009–10	A-League	18	0	0	0	0	0	18	0
Central Coast Mariners	2010–11	A-League	3	0	0	0	0	0	3	0
Newcastle Jets	2014–15	A-League	0	0	0	0	0	0	0	0
Career total			35	0	1	0	0	0	36	0

== Honours ==
Australia U-20

- OFC U-19 Men's Championship: 2001

== See also ==
- List of Central Coast Mariners FC players
- List of Gold Coast United FC players
- List of foreign Serie B players
