= Tahj Minniecon =

Australian soccer player (born 1989)

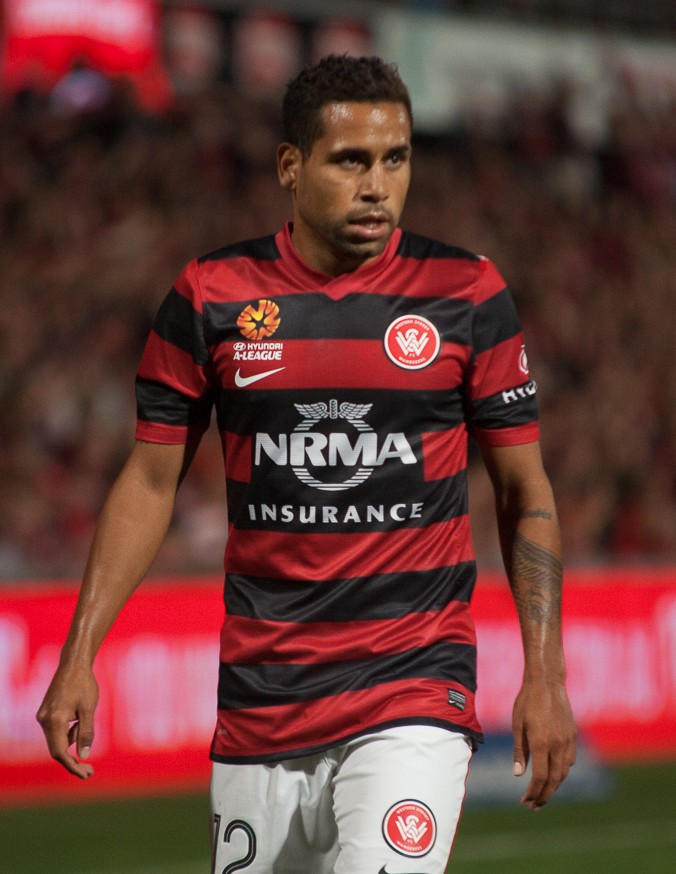
- Minniecon playing for Western Sydney Wanderers in 2013

Personal information
- Full name: Tahj James Rodney Minniecon
- Date of birth: 13 February 1989 (age 37)
- Place of birth: Cairns, Queensland, Australia
- Height: 1.74 m (5 ft 9 in)
- Positions: Winger; striker

Youth career
- Queensland Lions
- 2005–2006: QAS
- 2006–2007: AIS
- 2011: Gold Coast United

Senior career*
Years	Team	Apps	(Gls)
2007	AIS	14	(2)
2007–2009	Queensland Roar	24	(4)
2008	→ Redlands United (loan)	15	(9)
2009–2012	Gold Coast United	39	(1)
2012–2014	Western Sydney Wanderers	16	(0)
2014	Rockdale City Suns	10	(0)
2014–2017	Meralco Manila	26	(4)
2018	Nunawading City FC	23	(2)
2018	Davao Aguilas	4	(1)

International career
2007–2009	Australia U-20	26	(4)
2010	Australia U-23	4	(1)
- * Club domestic league appearances and goals as of 22:18, 6 May 2017 (UTC)

Tahj James Rodney Minniecon (born 13 February 1989) is an Indigenous Australian former soccer player who most recently played for Davao Aguilas FC in Philippines Football League in 2018.

== Early life ==
Tahj James Rodney Minniecon grew up in Brisbane and went to Cavendish Road State High School and Carbrook State School. He is of Indigenous Australian heritage. One of his junior clubs was Loganholme Lightning Football Club.

== Club career ==
=== Queensland Roar ===
Minniecon was signed by the Roar from the AIS in 2007. On signing a two-year deal he said, "This is my home-town club and ever since the A-League started I always wanted to start my career with Queensland Roar. My family and friends are in Brisbane and I can’t wait to get started".

=== Gold Coast United ===
On 3 January 2009, it was revealed that Minniecon had signed with new A-League franchise Gold Coast United for their inaugural season in the A-League. Minniecon was set for a trade with Newcastle Jets striker Chris Payne, however the move fell through when Minniecon suffered a heel injury during a youth league game against Sydney FC.

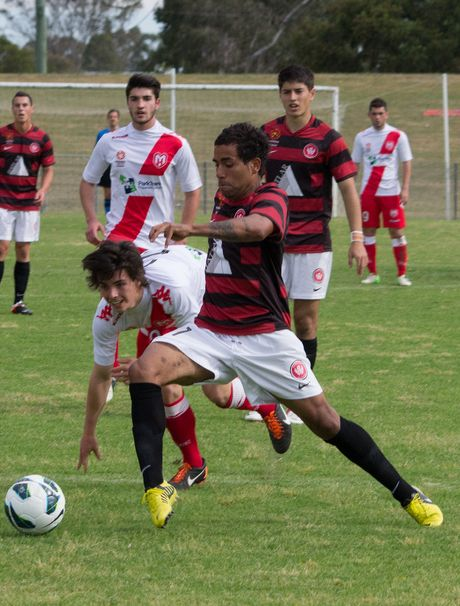
Tahj Minniecon in action for Western Sydney Wanderers National Youth League team.

=== Western Sydney Wanderers ===
After spending time on trial with Western Sydney Wanderers he completed the signing of a one-year contract on 8 August 2012. Minnecon was the Wanderer's first Indigenous player.

=== Rockdale City Suns ===
After being released by Western Sydney, Minniecon signed a short-term contract with NSW NPL1 club Rockdale City.

=== Meralco Manila ===
On 1 December 2014, it was announced that Minniecon had signed a 1-year deal plus extension with Filipino-based club Loyola Meralco Sparks in an attempt to get his career back on track. On 15 February 2015, Minniecon made his debut and scored his first goal for Loyola in a 2–3 away win against Manila Jeepney in the 2015 United Football League.

The club changed their name to FC Meralco Manila when it joined the Philippines Football League in 2017. However the club was dissolved in January 2018 after playing in the inaugural season leaving Minniecon without a club.

== Career statistics ==
Club	Season	League^{1}		Cup		International^{2}		Total	
Club	Season	Apps	Goals	Apps	Goals	Apps	Goals	Apps	Goals
Queensland Roar	2007–08	9	1	0	0	0	0	9	1
Queensland Roar	2008–09	15	3	0	0	0	0	15	3
Gold Coast United	2009–10	17	1	0	0	0	0	17	1
Gold Coast United	2010–11	18	1	0	0	0	0	18	1
Total		59	6					59	6

^{1} - includes A-League final series statistics
^{2} - includes FIFA Club World Cup statistics; AFC Champions League statistics are included in season commencing after group stages (i.e. ACL in A-League seasons etc.)

== Honours ==
=== Club ===
Gold Coast United:

- National Youth League Championship: 2009-2010

Western Sydney Wanderers

- A-League Premiership: 2012–13

=== International ===
Australia:

- AFF U19 Youth Championship: 2008
