= James Brown (Australian soccer) =

Australian soccer player

Personal information
- Full name: James Brown
- Date of birth: 19 February 1990 (age 36)
- Place of birth: Sydney, Australia
- Height: 1.80 m (5 ft 11 in)
- Position: Attacking midfielder

Team information
- Current team: Hume City FC
- Number: 18

Youth career
- Burleigh Heads
- 2005–2006: QAS
- 2007–2008: AIS

Senior career*
Years	Team	Apps	(Gls)
2007	AIS	22	(4)
2008–2012	Gold Coast United	38	(9)
2012–2014	Newcastle Jets	28	(0)
2014–2016	Melbourne City	16	(1)
2016	Avondale	5	(0)
2016	Cape Town City	2	(0)
2017	Nunawading City	37	(9)
2018–2020	Hume City	45	(17)
2020	Gold Coast United	11	(0)
2021	Hume City	8	(2)
2021	Nunawading City	9	(7)
2022	Essendon Royals	4	(1)
2022	Caroline Springs George Cross	13	(4)
2023–	Hume City	3	(0)

International career^{‡}
2005–2007	Australia U-17	7	(2)
2007–2008	Australia U-20	11	(0)
2010–2011	Australia U-23	6	(0)
- * Club domestic league appearances and goals as of 4 March 2023 ‡ National team caps and goals as of 6 March 2015

James Brown (born 19 February 1990) is an Australian soccer player who currently plays for National Premier Leagues club Hume City FC. At youth level, he played for the Australia national under-23 soccer team. He has 82 caps in the A-League with Gold Coast United, Newcastle Jets and Melbourne City between 2008 and 2016. He is Indigenous Australian.

== Club career ==
From the Australian Institute of Sport (AIS), James Brown originally began his football career in the Tweed Heads region of N.S.W. Australia, with Bilambil F.C. and then Kingscliff Soccer Club, before moving on to play for Burleigh Heads on the Gold Coast. After being scouted by several representative teams, and playing football with the Gold Coast Representative Side and an Australia Selection at the Under 13 National Championships, Brown came through the ranks of the QAS, and was then signed by the AIS in 2007. A terrific start to the Victorian Premier League season in 2007 saw Brown rise through the ranks at the AIS and become a regular starter and key player for them. Brown scored 4 goals in 22 games, playing alongside the likes of Luke De Vere, Kofi Danning, James Holland and Daniel Mullen. As the season came to a close, Brown was found to have developed the Osteitis pubis condition, which has limited his footballing over the past 12 months.

=== Gold Coast United ===
On 9 December 2008 Brown was signed to a three-year deal by Gold Coast United. On 2 June 2009 Brown broke his right fibula in training, sidelining him for 8 weeks. On 13 January 2010 Brown scored his first senior goal in a 2–0 win over the Newcastle Jets at Skilled Park from a beautiful one-two with captain Jason Culina. In the 2011 season debut, Brown scored a stunning late equalizer in a 1–1 draw with Wellington Phoenix, the goal was voted goal of the week. In the second game of the season, Brown scored another terrific goal in a 1–1 draw against the Central Coast Mariners. In Round 4, Brown scored in a 3–1 win over the Newcastle Jets. In Round 6, Brown scored a goal from a heavy deflection in a 2–1 away defeat to Adelaide United. Brown was subsequently voted October's young player of the month.

=== Newcastle Jets ===
On 15 February 2012 it was announced he had signed a two-year contract with A-League club Newcastle Jets starting at the beginning of the 2012–13 A-League season.

=== Melbourne City ===
On 20 May 2014 it was announced that Brown joined Melbourne City alongside two other youth players, Connor Chapman and Jacob Melling. He scored his first goal in the 70th minute against Sydney FC to boost the team's finals hopes On 28 April 2016, Brown was released by Melbourne City.

=== Avondale ===
On 19 May 2016, Brown joined National Premier League club Avondale, but departed the club after a month.

=== Cape Town City ===
In August 2016, Brown joined newly formed South African Premier Division side Cape Town City. Brown parted ways with the club in October 2016, after only 3 appearances.

=== Nunawading City ===
In early 2017, it was announced Brown had signed for NPL Victoria side, Nunawading City FC. Brown scored on debut against the Eastern Lions in Round 1 of the 2017 season.

== Career statistics ==
As of 23 February 2017

Club	Season	League			Cup		Continental		Total	
Club	Season	Division	Apps	Goals	Apps	Goals	Apps	Goals	Apps	Goals
Australian Institute of Sport	2007	Victorian Premier League	22	4	0	0	0	0	22	4
Gold Coast United	2009–10	A-League	9	1	0	0	0	0	9	1
Gold Coast United	2010–11	A-League	12	2	0	0	0	0	12	2
Gold Coast United	2011–12	A-League	17	6	0	0	0	0	17	6
Gold Coast United	Gold Coast total		38	9	0	0	0	0	38	9
Newcastle Jets	2012–13	A-League	16	0	0	0	0	0	16	0
Newcastle Jets	2013–14	A-League	12	0	0	0	0	0	12	0
Newcastle Jets	Newcastle total		28	0	0	0	0	0	28	0
Melbourne City	2014–15	A-League	15	1	1	0	0	0	16	1
Melbourne City	2015–16	A-League	1	0	0	0	0	0	1	0
Melbourne City	City total		16	1	1	0	0	0	17	1
Avondale	2016	National Premier Leagues	5	0	0	0	0	0	5	0
Cape Town City	2016–17	South African Premier Division	2	0	1	0	0	0	3	0
Nunawading City	2017	National Premier Leagues Victoria 2	3	1	0	0	0	0	3	1
Career total			114	15	2	0	0	0	116	15

== Honours ==
=== Country ===
Australia

- AFF U19 Youth Championship: 2008
