= Samuel Tesfagabr =

Eritrean footballer

Personal information
- Full name: Samuel Ghebrehiwet Tesfagabr
- Date of birth: 5 May 1985 (age 41)
- Place of birth: Khartoum, Sudan
- Height: 1.85 m (6 ft 1 in)
- Position: Left back

Senior career*
Years	Team	Apps	(Gls)
2011	Western Strikers	14	(1)
2011–2012	Gold Coast United	0	(0)
2012–2015	Adelaide Comets	70	(20)
2016	Adelaide Blue Eagles	23	(3)
2017	Adelaide Olympic	7	(0)
2017–2018	West Adelaide	32	(5)
2019–2020	WT Birkalla	18	(4)
2021	Para Hills	4	(0)

International career^{‡}
2009	Eritrea	?	(?)
- * Club domestic league appearances and goals as of 4 November 2021 ‡ National team caps and goals as of 24 September 2012

Samuel Tesfagabr is an Eritrean footballer. He defected from Eritrea while on national team duty at a tournament in Kenya and received asylum in Australia. He was signed to the A-League team Gold Coast United in their final season. As of 2016, he plays for Adelaide Blue Eagles in the National Premier Leagues South Australia.

== Escape from Eritrea ==
Tesfagabr was part of the Eritrea national football team and played in the 2009 CECAFA Cup in Kenya, appearing in the 2-1 group match defeat to Rwanda. When the team plane returned, none of the players including Tesfagabr were on it sparking a search by Eritrean authorities. Tesfagabr and his teammates avoided detection for ten days in Nairobi before finding their way to a refugee camp 800 km from the Kenyan capital. They spent eight months at the camp before they were granted refugee status by Australia. After receiving refugee status from the Australian government, the team moved to Adelaide.

== Career in Australia ==
After moving to Australia, Tesfagabr, and three other Eritreans signed with the Western Strikers SC of FFSA Super League. While playing for the club, he worked for a local switchboard manufacturer. For the 2011–12 season, he, along with fellow Eritrean refugee Ambesager Yosief, signed with A-League club Gold Coast United. Tesfagabr did not make an official appearance for the club. At the end of the season, Gold Coast United lost their license and were dissolved. For the 2013 season, he signed with the Adelaide Comets of the FFSA Super League. In 2016, he made a move to the previous season's runner-up Adelaide Blue Eagles in the same league, which is now called National Premier Leagues South Australia.

Tesfagabr became an Australian citizen in 2016.
