= Nunawading City FC =

Nunawading City
- Full name: Nunawading City Football Club
- Nickname: Nuna
- Founded: 1971
- Ground: Mahoney's Reserve
- Capacity: 500
- Chairman: Nek Dimitrakis
- Manager: Steve Voursoukis
- League: Victoria Premier League 2
- 2026: 11th of 14
- Website: www.nunawadingcityfc.com.au
Home colours	Away colours

Nunawading City Football Club is an Australian semi-professional association football club based in Forest Hill, a suburb of Melbourne, Victoria. Founded in 1971, the club currently competes in the Victoria Premier League 2

== History ==
=== Recent History ===
In the 2014 season, Nunawading finished in bottom place of the Victorian State League Division 2 South-East, amassing seven points in 22 games. However due to Football Federation Victoria ranking Nunawading as one of the states elite junior clubs, they were given a licence to participate in the National Premier Leagues Victoria 2 for 2015, the second tier of football in the state.

\Midway through 2014, Nunawading City youth player, Jake Brimmer was scouted by Liverpool FC, Liverpool scout Barry Hunter spotted him playing for the Victorian National Training Centre squad in July 2013.

In 2015, after 20 consecutive losses, City earned its first point in the NPL2 competition on 18 July 2015, in a 0–0 draw away from home against Whittlesea Ranges. The point would prove to be the only point Nunawading earned that season, finishing the season in bottom place with a −95 goal difference, but were not relegated due to no relegation existing from NPL2 for 2014–2016.

In May 2016, Nunawading striker Emile Damey was selected in the squad for Liberia ahead of Africa Cup of Nations qualification matches.

Nunawading City got their first win in NPL2 when it defeated Murray United 3–1 at Mahoneys Reserve on 22 May 2016. The win was City's only points for the 2016 season, finishing again in bottom place with a −92 goal difference.

Nuna signed a number of ex-A-League players for the 2017 season, including Mitch Cooper, Patrick Gerhardt, James Brown and Jason Trifiro. Cooper scored a total of 21 goals for Nunawading, who avoided relegation in 2017 with a 9th placed finished, four points above Richmond SC.

With the departures of Patrick Gerhardt, Jason Trifiro, Jagajeet Shrestha, and Mitch Cooper at the end of the 2017 season, Nunawading City announced the signings of NPL Victoria Gold Medal winner Massimo Murdocca and A-League veteran Fahid Ben Khalfallah in October 2017.

In 2018, Nunawading City competed in the NPL Victoria 2 East, the state’s second tier. The club struggled throughout the season and ultimately finished in last place, resulting in relegation to the Victorian State League Division 1 South-East for 2019. During this period, former A-League star and Melbourne Victory legend Fahid Ben Khalfallah came out of retirement and signed for Nunawading as a player, fulfilling a promise made to the coaching staff. His association with the club began through a connection with the club’s media manager and president, Nek Dimitrakis. This signing was significant given Ben Khalfallah’s experience as a former Ligue 1 player and Tunisia international.

Following relegation and the resignation of head coach Greg Mangonis in late 2018, Ben Khalfallah was appointed player-coach for the 2019 season. In this dual role, he led the team both on and off the pitch. Under his leadership, Nunawading City dominated the State League Division 1 South-East, finishing as champions and securing promotion back into the National Premier Leagues system for 2020. This promotion was into the newly formed NPL Victoria 3 introduced as part of a restructure of Victorian football leagues.

Ben Khalfallah’s leadership extended beyond results. He cultivated a professional culture and tactical identity, combining his extensive top-level playing experience with a focus on nurturing local talent. Following the 2019 championship win, the club notably celebrated with a team trip to Las Vegas, reflecting the strong spirit and ambition he instilled.

The 2020 NPL3 season was cancelled due to the COVID-19 pandemic, so Nunawading’s return to the NPL effectively resumed in 2021. Ben Khalfallah continued as player-coach into the inaugural NPL3 campaign, but after another disrupted season and the cancellation of the 2021 competition, the club announced in October 2021 that they had parted ways with him and his assistant Devon Bonne, concluding his influential tenure.

After Ben Khalfallah’s departure in late 2021, Nunawading City continued competing in the NPL Victoria 3 division as the Victorian football leagues stabilized following pandemic disruptions. The club maintained a mid-table presence throughout the 2022 and 2023 seasons, finishing fifth in both years. While competitive, they fell short of achieving promotion to higher tiers.

At the conclusion of the 2023 season, Football Victoria restructured and rebranded the state’s league system. The former NPL Victoria 2 was renamed Victoria Premier League 1 (VPL1), and NPL Victoria 3 became Victoria Premier League 2 (VPL2). This change preserved Nunawading City’s position in the third tier but under a new league name.

In 2024, Nunawading City competed in VPL2 and finished ninth in the 12-team competition. Despite the lower table finish, the club showed resilience and continued efforts to build squad depth and tactical discipline.

In 2025, led by head coach Steve Voursoukis, while competing in the Victorian Premier League 2 (VPL2), Nunawading City made a historic breakthrough in national competition by defeating NPL Victoria side Hume City 4–0 to qualify for the national Australia Cup Round of 32 for the first time. They entered the national stage as the lowest ranked club to reach that phase of the tournament, a distinction that highlighted the scale of their achievement and captured the imagination of the broader football community. Their triumph stood in contrast to the other Victorian qualifiers, with established NPL clubs South Melbourne, Avondale and Heidelberg United also progressing to the Round of 32. Nunawading, once an obscure club playing out of a modest suburban ground, were now on the national stage with a chance to reach the Round of 16 and potentially face an A-League opponent. Their success earned them a headline-making away draw against Darwin Olympic, pitting Victoria’s east against the Northern Territory's finest in a clash of regional identities.

Simultaneously, Nuna reached the semi-finals of the Dockerty Cup, showcasing their depth and resilience across multiple competitions. The cup run reflected a club on the rise, built on a foundation of youthful talent, tactical discipline and a long-term vision that had matured since their formative NPL2 seasons. The 2025 season, marked by both national qualification and state-level cup success, stands as the most significant in Nunawading City’s senior history to date.

== First team Squad ==
As of 21 April 2022

Note: Flags indicate national team as defined under FIFA eligibility rules; some limited exceptions apply. Players may hold more than one non-FIFA nationality.

No.	Pos.	Nation	Player
1	GK	AUS	Stephen Hatzikourtis
2	DF	AUS	Nicholas Apostolopoulos
3	DF	AUS	Andrew Mullett (captain)
4	DF	AUS	Anthony Del Medico
5	DF	AUS	Andrew Visciglio
17	MF	AUS	Felix Dimitrakis
21	FW	AUS	Alexander Dimitriou
23	MF	AUS	Nicholas Kyranakis
27	GK	AUS	Dennys Martin
36	DF	AUS	James Riordan
