= HNK Trogir =

Croatian association football club

- Full name: HNK Trogir
- Founded: 1912; 114 years ago
- Ground: Igralište Batarija
- Capacity: 1,021
- League: 1. ŽNL Splitsko-dalmatinska
Home colours	Away colours

HNK Trogir is a Croatian football club based in town of Trogir on the Croatian coast. Trogir plays home matches at Igralište Batarija.

== History ==
HNK Trogir was founded in 1912. In 2009 the club fell into financial difficulties and resigned from the Treća HNL – South after only 7 matches.

== Honours ==
(Croatia)

- 1.ŽNL – S-D:
  - Winners (1): 2004–05

(Croatia)

- Treća HNL – South:
  - Winners (1): 2006–07

== Recent seasons ==
Season	League									Cup
Season	Division	P	W	D	L	F	A	Pts	Pos	Cup
1997–98	3. HNL South A	30	16	3	11	52	47	51^{(−1)}	8th ↓	
1998–99	1. ŽNL S-D	26	4	7	15	23	54	19	13th ↓	
1999–00	2. ŽNL S-D	21	15	3	3	75	20	48	2nd ↑	
2000–01	1. ŽNL S-D	26	15	4	7	46	28	49	4th	
2001–02	1. ŽNL S-D	26	7	4	15	26	40	25	11th	
2002–03	1. ŽNL S-D	28	10	9	9	42	35	39	6th	
2003–04	1. ŽNL S-D	26	9	2	15	37	50	29	10th	
2004–05	1. ŽNL S-D	32	25	3	4	65	16	78	1st ↑	
2005–06	3. HNL South	34	17	6	11	59	50	57	3rd	
2006–07	3. HNL South	34	22	7	5	85	31	73	1st ↑	
2007–08	2. HNL	30	12	6	12	40	37	42	8th	R1
2008–09	2. HNL	30	3	12	15	32	49	21	16th ↓	PR
2009–10	3. HNL South								18th ↓↓	
2010–11	1. ŽNL S-D	24	16	3	5	46	22	51	2nd	
2011–12	1. ŽNL S-D	28	20	3	5	51	21	63	1st ↑	
2012–13	1. ŽNL S-D	24	3	6	15	22	57	15	13th ↓	
2013–14	2. ŽNL S-D	24	7	4	13	51	46	23	7th	
2014–15	2. ŽNL S-D	28	10	3	15	57	66	33	6th	
2015–16	2. ŽNL S-D	20	13	1	6	41	20	40	2nd	
2016–17	2. ŽNL S-D	24	12	5	7	45	40	41	3rd	
2017–18	2. ŽNL S-D	21	12	1	8	50	33	37	3rd	

=== Key ===
- P = Played
- W = Games won
- D = Games drawn
- L = Games lost
- F = Goals for
- A = Goals against
- Pts = Points
- Pos = Final position
- 2. HNL = Croatian Second League
- 3. HNL = Croatian Third League
- 1. ŽNL = First County League
- 2. ŽNL = Second County League
- S-D = Split-Dalmatia
- R1 = Round 1
- R2 = Round 2
- QF = Quarter-finals
- SF = Semi-finals
- RU = Runners-up
- W = Winners
