= Mitch Bevan =

Australian soccer player

Personal information
- Full name: Mitchell Bevan
- Date of birth: 20 February 1991 (age 35)
- Place of birth: Brisbane, Australia
- Height: 1.53 m (5 ft 0 in)
- Position: Left winger

Team information
- Current team: Grange Thistle

Youth career
- Albany Creek
- Brisbane City
- 2007–2008: QAS
- 2008–2009: Brisbane Roar
- 2009: Gold Coast United FC

Senior career*
Years	Team	Apps	(Gls)
2009–2012	Gold Coast United FC	8	(0)
2013	Albany Creek	21	(2)
2014	Far North Queensland	17	(7)
2015	Southside Comets	15	(7)
2016	Stratford Dolphins	19	(10)
2017–2018	Mitchelton	40	(3)
2019–	Grange Thistle	55	(5)
- * Club domestic league appearances and goals as of 23 September 2022 ‡ National team caps and goals as of 03:27, 20 September 2009 (UTC)

Mitch Bevan (born 20 February 1991) in Brisbane) is an Australian footballer who plays for Far North Queensland FC in the National Premier Leagues Queensland.

== Club career ==
He was signed to Gold Coast United's inaugural National Youth League after having played in Brisbane Roar's National Youth League squad the previous season.

On 7 November 2009 he made his senior debut for United as an 89th-minute substitute in 1–0 win against Sydney FC.

Bevan now plays in Cairns for the Far North Queensland FC Heat.

== Honours ==
With Gold Coast United FC:

- National Youth League Championship: 2009–2010
