= Chris Lucas =

Australian soccer player

Personal information
- Full name: Chris Lucas
- Date of birth: 27 March 1992 (age 34)
- Place of birth: Tweed Heads, Australia
- Height: 1.70 m (5 ft 7 in)
- Position: Forward

Youth career
- 1997–2011: Palm Beach
- 2011–2012: Gold Coast United

Senior career*
Years	Team	Apps	(Gls)
2011	Palm Beach	19	(23)
2011–2012	Gold Coast United	1	(0)
2012–2014	Palm Beach	65	(76)
2015–2018	Bentleigh Greens	75	(34)
2019	Olympic FC	27	(29)
2020	Dandenong City	1	(0)
2021	Altona Magic	8	(1)
2021–2023	Oakleigh Cannons	62	(15)
2024–	Gold Coast United	21	(10)
- * Club domestic league appearances and goals as of 29 January 2025

Chris Lucas (born 27 March 1992) is an Australian professional soccer player who plays as a forward for Oakleigh Cannons in the NPL Victoria. Lucas played for Gold Coast United for the A-League in 2011-12 season and made his professional debut on 22 January 2012 against Sydney FC. Lucas did play for Olympic FC in the National Premier Leagues Queensland.

== Club career ==
=== Palm Beach ===
At the age of 5 he signed for Gold Coast Premier League side Palm Beach. He was signed for Gold Coast on the back of a stellar season which saw him score 23 in only just 19 games.

=== Gold Coast United ===
In 2011, he signed a youth contract with A-League club Gold Coast United. He made his professional debut in the 2011-12 A-League season on 22 January 2012 in a round 16 clash against Sydney FC at the Sydney Football Stadium when came on as an 81st minute substitute. Gold Coast United was dissolved in 2012 and Lucas was left without an A-League contract.

=== Return to Palm Beach ===
Lucas returned to Palm Beach for the 2012 season.

=== Bentleigh Greens ===
Lucas moved to Victoria to sign for NPL Victoria side Bentleigh Greens for the 2015 season. Lucas was Bentleigh's top goalscorer as the side won the league championship. On 21 August 2018 he scored a hat trick in Bentleigh Greens 4-0 win against Broadmeadow Magic in a round of 16 of the 2018 FFA Cup making him just the fourth to do so for a non-Hyundai A-League club.

=== Olympic FC ===
In November 2018, Lucas returned to the NPL Queensland signing on to play with Olympic FC. On 24 July 2019 he entered the record books after becoming the first ever player to have scored two hat tricks in the FFA Cup after scoring three goals against Perth based side Bayswater City.

=== Altona Magic ===
In January 2021, Lucas signing to play with Altona Magic in NPL Victoria for the 2021 season.
