= Ante Rožić =

Croatian footballer

Ante Rozić
Personal information
- Date of birth: 8 March 1986 (age 40)
- Place of birth: Bankstown, Australia
- Height: 1.90 m (6 ft 3 in)
- Position: Defender

Youth career
- 1996–2004: Hajduk Split

Senior career*
Years	Team	Apps	(Gls)
2004–2008	Hajduk Split	0	(0)
2005–2006	→ Mosor (loan)	15	(2)
2006	→ Cibalia (loan)	6	(0)
2007	→ Zadar (loan)	17	(1)
2008	→ Trogir (loan)	8	(1)
2008	Trogir	12	(0)
2009–2010	Sedan	21	(1)
2010–2011	Arka Gdynia	22	(0)
2011–2012	Gold Coast United	11	(0)
2012–2013	Metalurh Zaporizhzhia	1	(0)
2013	Suphanburi	0	(0)
2013–2014	Hajduk Split	0	(0)
Total		113	(5)

International career
2006	Croatia U20	1	(0)
- * Club domestic league appearances and goals

Ante Rožić (born 8 March 1986) is a former professional footballer who played as a defender. Born in Australia, he represented Croatia at youth international level.

== Early life ==
Born to Croatian parents in Australia. Rožić moved to Croatia in 1996. His father was a Yugoslav international footballer, Vedran Rožić.

== Club career ==
=== Croatia ===
Rožić came through the youth system at HNK Hajduk Split but never broke into the first team. For the 2005–06 season he was sent on loan to 2 HNL club NK Mosor, where he played 15 games, scoring 3 goals. The first part of 2006–07 season saw him play in 1 HNL for HNK Cibalia before moving to NK Zadar in the 2 HNL for the remainder of the season. He started the 2007–08 season with NK Zadar before moving to 2 HNL side HNK Trogir, where he became a first team regular.

=== CS Sedan Ardennes ===
Rožić signed a two-year contract with French club CS Sedan Ardennes on 25 January 2009.

=== Arka Gdynia ===
In July 2010, Rožić joined Arka Gdynia on a two-year contract. He was released by the club on 30 June 2011.

=== Gold Coast United ===
On 10 August 2011, Gold Coast United FC announced Rožić as their final signing to complete their squad for the upcoming season.

== International career ==
Rožić played one match for the Croatian U-20 team in 2006.
