= Daniel Bragg =

Australian footballer

Personal information
- Full name: Daniel Bragg
- Date of birth: 3 August 1992 (age 34)
- Place of birth: Sydney, Australia
- Height: 1.71 m (5 ft 7 in)
- Position: Attacking midfielder

Youth career
- –2011: Blacktown City
- 2011–2012: Gold Coast United FC
- 2012–2013: Central Coast Mariners

Senior career*
Years	Team	Apps	(Gls)
2011	Blacktown City	1	(0)
2012	Gold Coast United FC	3	(0)
2012	Blacktown City	22	(0)
2013	CCM Academy	18	(0)
2014	APIA Leichhardt	10	(0)
2014	Sydney United 58	8	(0)
2015–2016	Manly United	43	(2)
2018–2019	Blacktown City	24	(2)
- * Club domestic league appearances and goals as of 23 September 2019

Daniel Bragg (born 3 August 1992) is an Australian footballer who plays as an attacking midfielder for Blacktown City FC.

== Club career ==
=== Early career ===
He started his career playing for NSW Premier League side Blacktown City.

=== Gold Coast United ===
In 2011, he had signed with the Gold Coast United FC who play in the A-League. He made his senior professional debut for Gold Coast United FC during the 2011–12 A-League campaign in a round 20 fixture against Adelaide United
