= Chris O'Connor (soccer) =

Australian soccer player

Personal information
- Full name: Chris O'Connor
- Date of birth: 7 May 1985 (age 41)
- Place of birth: Brisbane, Australia
- Height: 1.83 m (6 ft 0 in)
- Position: Goalkeeper

Team information
- Current team: Gold Coast United FC
- Number: 40

Youth career
- 1991–2000: Rochedale Rovers

Senior career*
Years	Team	Apps	(Gls)
2000–2003	Rochedale Rovers	?	(1)
2003–2009	Bray Wanderers	147	(1)
2010–2011	Bohemians	27	(0)
2011–2012	Gold Coast United FC	3	(0)

International career
2005	Australian U-20	1	(0)
2008	Australian U-23	1	(0)
- * Club domestic league appearances and goals

Chris O'Connor (born 7 May 1985) is an Australian goalkeeper.

== Club career ==
O'Connor signed for Rochedale Rovers senior team in the Brisbane's Men's League at the age of 15. He was the youngest player ever to be signed in the Queensland State League. He went on to play for Queensland at U-16 and U-19 level.

He was signed for Bray Wanderers in 2003 at age 18 and represented the Eircom League in the U-21s Four Nations Tournament in Scotland in 2004.

The PFAI named O'Connor as the goalkeeper of the year for first division in 2004 after Bray were promoted to Premier League after that season. O'Connor's form was seen as a major reason for the Bray's promotion in 2004 as he kept 15 clean sheets (a new club record) in 33 league games.

Despite his youth O'Connor remained as Bray's first choice goalkeeper throughout the majority of his stay at the Carlisle Grounds and his form was rewarded at the end of the 2009 season when he was nominated for Goalkeeper of the Year in the League of Ireland. Bohs' Brian Murphy went on to win that award for the third successive year but in light of Murphy's departure from the club, Pat Fenlon brought O'Connor to Dalymount Park in time for the 2010 season.

O'Connor made an impressive competitive debut for Bohs on 13 March in the Setanta Sports Cup match against Glentoran, and was selected to feature in his first league game for the club 3 days later, away to UCD Chris spent most of the first half of the season as second choice goalkeeper for Pat Fenlon's side but regained his place midway through the season after some poor performances from Barry Murphy. Unfortunately for Chris and Bohs, they would lose the league title on goal difference.

On 23 December 2011, it was revealed that Gold Coast United FC had signed O'Connor for the glitter-strip side as an injury replacement signing for New Zealand international Goalkeeper Glen Moss. On 1 February 2011 he made his A-League debut against Melbourne Victory FC.

== International career ==
Chris O'Connor made his international debut for Australia in 2005 in the U-20 side in the World Youth Cup qualifiers in the Solomon Islands. After not playing for Australia for 3 years he was brought into the final U-23 Olympic selection camp in Darwin in June 2008 where he played against the Chilean U-23 side. From his performance during the camp O'Connor was selected in the 22-man squad to travel to Beijing for the Olympics.

== Honours ==
Bohemians

- Setanta Sports Cup (1): 2010
