= Maceo Rigters =

Dutch footballer (born 1984)

Personal information
- Date of birth: 22 January 1984 (age 42)
- Place of birth: Amsterdam, Netherlands
- Height: 1.79 m (5 ft 10 in)
- Position: Striker

Youth career
- –1997: ZSGOWMS
- 1997–2003: Neerlandia

Senior career*
| Years | Team | Apps | (Gls) |
| 2003–2004 | Heerenveen | 2 | (0) |
| 2004–2005 | Dordrecht | 17 | (8) |
| 2005–2007 | NAC Breda | 61 | (5) |
| 2007–2011 | Blackburn Rovers | 2 | (0) |
| 2008 | → Norwich City (loan) | 2 | (0) |
| 2008–2009 | → Barnsley (loan) | 19 | (0) |
| 2010 | → Willem II (loan) | 28 | (5) |
| 2011–2012 | Gold Coast United | 22 | (4) |
| Total | | 153 | (22) |

International career
| 2007 | Netherlands U21 | 9 | (6) |
Medal record
Men's football
Representing Netherlands
UEFA European Under-21 Championship
| Winner | 2007 |
- * Club domestic league appearances and goals

Maceo Rigters (born 22 January 1984) is a Dutch former professional footballer who played as a striker for SC Heerenveen, Dordrecht, NAC Breda and Willem II in the Netherlands, for Blackburn Rovers, Norwich City and Barnsley in England, and for Gold Coast United in Australia. He is also a former player for the Netherlands Under-21 team.

== Club career ==
=== Heerenveen, Dordrecht and NAC Breda ===
Rigters started his football career at Eredivisie club, Heerenveen where he made his senior debut during the 2002–03 season. He had a short spell at Eerste Divisie club Dordrecht in the 2004–05 season. On 1 January 2005, he signed a four-and-a-half-year contract with Eredivisie club NAC Breda, where he scored just five goals in 61 appearances.

=== Blackburn Rovers ===
Rigters was signed by Blackburn Rovers for an undisclosed fee on 2 July 2007, with the striker signing a four-year contract with the Lancashire club. He made his first official appearance for Blackburn Rovers in a UEFA Intertoto Cup match against Lithuanian club FK Vėtra on 22 July 2007 as a second-half substitute replacing Benni McCarthy in the 65th minute. His first start came on 30 August against Finnish club, MyPa, in a UEFA Cup first-round match, and he made his Premier League debut on 29 September.

Rigters played only one more league game for the club that season on 11 February 2008, and after struggling to make an impact at the club, he joined Championship club Norwich City 19 March on loan until the end of the 2007–08 season. He made his first appearance for Norwich as a 78th-minute substitute in a 5–1 win over Colchester United. However, in only his second substitute appearance for the club on 29 March, during a home defeat to Bristol City, Rigters lasted just fifteen minutes as he sustained a torn hamstring, and he subsequently returned to Blackburn for treatment.

On 8 August he joined Barnsley on loan for the 2008–09 Football League Championship season. In July 2009 Rigters was told he was free to find himself a new club. He subsequently undertook a trial at Southend United in an attempt to earn himself a contract with the club. However the trial was not successful and he returned to Blackburn Rovers to wait for another trial offer.

He then eventually returned to play for Blackburn on 2 January 2010 when he featured for 18 minutes against Aston Villa in the FA Cup third round in the 3–1 defeat. On 31 August, Rigters returned home to the Netherlands to join Willem II on a season long loan. On 1 July 2011, Rigters contract with Rovers ended, and he became a free agent.

=== Free agent ===
Following the expiration of his Rovers contract, on 19 August 2011, Rigters joined up with A-League team Wellington Phoenix initially on a 10-day trial. However, on 24 August 2011, the trial was cut short when Rigters could not agree terms to a permanent deal. Rigters had made only one pre-season appearance in a friendly with Phoenix, scoring the consolation goal in a 5–1 loss at home to 2010-11 A-League Champions, Brisbane Roar.

=== Gold Coast United ===
Rigters had initially traveled to New Zealand in the hope of signing a contract with Wellington Phoenix, however despite being offered a contract, Rigters turned it down due to a disagreement on wages. Only days later, on 1 September, it was announced that Rigters had signed a deal with fellow A-League club Gold Coast United, replacing American Alex Smith whose contract had been terminated, allowing the signing to go forth.

== International career ==
Rigters scored on his debut for the Netherlands national under-21 team on 5 February 2005 when he came on as a second-half substitute in a 3–0 win over Russia Under-21s, scoring the third Dutch goal. On 23 March he scored as the Dutch Under-21s drew 1–1 with Czech Republic Under-21s.

He was called up by under-21 team coach Foppe de Haan as a last minute addition to the squad for the 2007 UEFA European Under-21 Football Championship on the eve of the tournament which was held in the Netherlands. Rigters played in all three group stage matches, a 1–0 win against Israel Under 21s and a 2–1 win over Portugal Under-21s to secure a semi-final spot and therefore qualify for the 2008 Summer Olympics. He won the penalty from which Ryan Babel scored the first Dutch goal and he scored the second Dutch goal of the match and was named Man of the match by UEFA. In the last group match against Belgium Under-21s, Rigters scored in a 2–2 draw.

In the semi-finals against England Under-21s, Rigters scored a 90th-minute equaliser with a bicycle kick to take the match to extra time and eventually a penalty shoot-out, in which Rigters also scored as well, and the Dutch team won the shoot-out 13–12. He was also voted Man of the match for the second time.

The Dutch went on to retain their 2006 title by beating Serbia Under-21s 4–1 in the final. Rigters scored the third goal, his fourth of the tournament, which put him ahead of England's Leroy Lita and gave him the Golden Boot as top scorer. After the tournament he was named in the UEFA Team of the tournament.

== Coaching career ==
After retiring from professional football following his season at Gold Coast United in 2012, Rigters returned to Amsterdam. In October 2014 he rejoined ZSGOWMS—the club where he had begun as a youth player—as a player in the Derde Klasse, having approached the club himself during pre-season after two years without playing.

Alongside his return to playing, Rigters pursued coaching qualifications and gained experience with youth players at Almere City. He went on to take charge of youth teams at ZSGOWMS and established Maceo Rigters Soccer Development, a football coaching school in Amsterdam. In the 2018–19 season, he was appointed head coach of the ZSGOWMS senior side, then competing in the Saturday Derde Klasse.

In July 2021, Rigters was appointed coach of the under-21 side at Amsterdam club Zeeburgia. He was later named head coach of fellow Amsterdam club ASV De Dijk, then in the Saturday Derde Klasse, with Tareq Abed El Magied as his assistant, in February 2026.
