= Peter Jungschläger =

Dutch footballer

Personal information
- Full name: Peter Jungschläger
- Date of birth: 22 May 1984 (age 42)
- Place of birth: Voorburg, Netherlands
- Height: 1.82 m (6 ft 0 in)
- Position: Midfielder

Youth career
- –1995: DEVJO
- 1995–2005: ADO Den Haag

Senior career*
Years	Team	Apps	(Gls)
2005–2006	ADO Den Haag	12	(0)
2006–2007	RBC Roosendaal	53	(2)
2008	VVV-Venlo	7	(0)
2008–2011	De Graafschap	83	(4)
2011–2012	Gold Coast United	22	(2)
2012–2015	RKC Waalwijk	56	(2)
2015–2018	SVV Scheveningen	58	(0)
Total		291	(10)
- * Club domestic league appearances and goals

Peter Jungschläger (born 22 May 1984) is a Dutch former professional footballer who played as a midfielder.

== Biography ==
He previously played for VVV-Venlo, RBC Roosendaal, ADO Den Haag and De Graafschap.

On 1 July 2011, he signed for Australian club Gold Coast United who play in the A-League. At the end of the 2011-12 A-League season, the Gold Coast United club folded.

Jungschläger began playing for SVV Scheveningen in 2015, and retired from football after three seasons there.

== Honours ==
De Graafschap

- Eerste Divisie: 2009–10
