= Daniel Severino =

Australian soccer player

Personal information
- Full name: Daniel Severino
- Date of birth: 11 February 1982 (age 44)
- Place of birth: Sydney, Australia
- Height: 1.83 m (6 ft 0 in)
- Position: Central midfielder

Youth career
- Marconi Stallions

Senior career*
Years	Team	Apps	(Gls)
1999–2000	Marconi Stallions		
2000–2003	Piacenza	0	(0)
2003	Millwall	0	(0)
2003–2004	Marconi Stallions		
2004–2005	Bankstown City		
2006	Keflavík ÍF		(1)
2006	Umeå FC		
2007	Bankstown City		
2007	Sydney FC	0	(0)
2007–2008	Bankstown City		
2008–2009	Sliema Wanderers		(1)
2009	Bankstown City	11	(6)
2010	Bonnyrigg White Eagles	24	(12)
2010–2011	Lautoka F.C.	1	(0)
2011	Bonnyrigg White Eagles	10	(2)
2011	Sydney Olympic	2	(0)
2011–2012	Gold Coast United FC	12	(1)
2012	Marconi Stallions	19	(5)
2013–2014	Mounties Wanderers	47	(16)
- * Club domestic league appearances and goals as of 25.9.14

Daniel Severino (born 11 February 1982 in Sydney, Australia) is an Australian footballer who plays as a central midfielder for Marconi Stallions.

== Club career ==
Daniel plied his trade internationally and locally before joining A-League club Gold Coast United FC on 6 July 2011, on a one-year contract after impressing during a pre-season trial. He made his debut for Gold Coast United FC during the Round 1 fixture against Wellington Phoenix during the 2011–12 A-League campaign.
