= Jonas Salley =

Ivorian-Australian soccer player

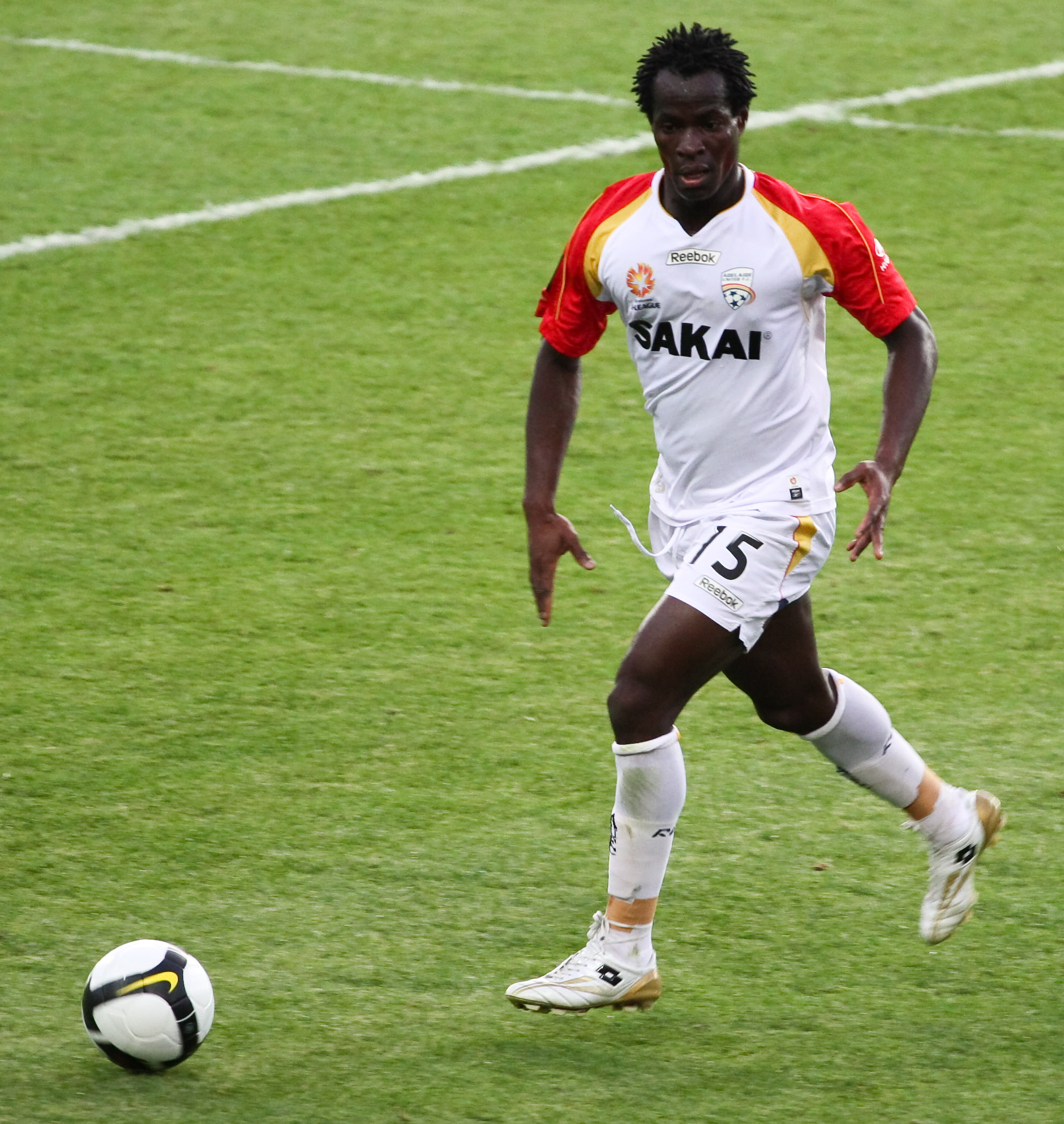
- Salley with Adelaide United in 2008

Personal information
- Full name: Gyawe Jonas Salley
- Date of birth: 16 March 1982 (age 44)
- Place of birth: Ouragahio, Ivory Coast
- Height: 1.83 m (6 ft 0 in)
- Position: Central midfielder

Team information
- Current team: White City (assistant)

Senior career*
| Years | Team | Apps | (Gls) |
| 1999–2001 | Sirocco FC | | |
| 2001–2004 | Séwé Sport | | |
| 2004–2005 | Africa Sports National | | |
| 2006 | South Melbourne | 9 | (1) |
| 2006–2007 | New Zealand Knights | 15 | (0) |
| 2007 | Sydney FC | 1 | (0) |
| 2007 | Sunshine George Cross | 9 | (0) |
| 2007–2009 | Adelaide United | 31 | (0) |
| 2009–2010 | Shaanxi Chanba | 56 | (1) |
| 2011 | Chengdu Blades | 25 | (0) |
| 2011–2012 | Gold Coast United | 12 | (0) |
| 2012 | Shanghai Shenxin | 28 | (3) |
| 2013–2014 | Guizhou Renhe | 58 | (0) |
| 2015–2016 | Nei Mongol Zhongyou | 35 | (1) |
| Total | | 285 | (6) |

Managerial career
- 2019–2020: Qingdao Red Lions (assistant)
- 2020–: White City (assistant)
- * Club domestic league appearances and goals as of 22 October 2016

Gyawe Jonas Salley (born 16 March 1982 in Ivory Coast) is a former Ivorian-Australian footballer, who last played for Nei Mongol Zhongyou in China League One. He is currently an assistant coach for White City.

== Early life ==
Salley moved to Australia to escape from the civil and government problems of his home country in 2006.

== Club career ==
He first played at Mill Park Soccer Club, where his outstanding performances were noticed within a very short time. He was eventually signed up to play with Victorian Premier League side South Melbourne.

He was then signed by A-League club New Zealand Knights in 2006. Salley was a fan favourite at the Knights for his high work rate and quality passes. Despite being injured for a large part of the season, he made a huge impact for the team on his return with his strength and fitness.

As the Knights folded at the end of the A-League 2006-07 season, Salley signed with Sydney FC on a short-term contract as cover for their finals campaign. He made one appearance for Sydney FC before they were eliminated. He chose not to stay at the club after his short-term contract, and then played briefly for Sunshine George Cross FC.

On 13 March 2007, it was announced that Salley was signing for Adelaide United on a 2-year deal. Despite being an Australian citizen, Salley was ruled to be a foreign player under new FIFA amendments stating that a player must reside in country for a minimum of five years before local status is obtained. This meant he was ineligible to play in the 2008 AFC Champions League as Adelaide listed Brazilians Cássio, Cristiano and Diego as their three foreign players.

He stated that he was ready to leave the club because of the lack of game time at Adelaide, during the 2008/2009 season:

"For me I need to move on," Salley told the Adelaide Advertiser. "I've already made up my mind. I don't know what's going on. I was looking forward to playing here but it doesn't look like it's going to happen and that's the way it is. I'm here just training, training, I don't know what I'm here for. I haven't spoken to anyone about it. For me it's not the best way, if you're not going to use someone tell him why he's not playing."

After many weeks of speculation the Ivorian born Salley, was released by the club on 20 January 2009. In March 2009, Salley signed with Chinese Super League club Shaanxi Chanba on a free transfer.

Returning to Australia, Salley signed an emergency injury replacement deal on loan with A-League club Gold Coast United. The Queensland club will be looking to sign him on a permanent deal when they find room within the salary cap.

As Gold Coast struggled with injuries leading up to their game against Melbourne Heart in February 2012 it was revealed Salley had defected, signing a lucrative contract with a Chinese Super League team.

In January 2013, Salley signed with Chinese Super League club Guizhou Renhe on a free transfer.

In January 2015, Salley signed with China League One club Nei Mongol Zhongyou.

On 18 February 2017 Salley was forced into retirement due to a knee injury.

== Coaching career ==
On 1 May 2019 Salley was announced as an assistant coach to Adelaide United's sister club Qingdao Red Lions.

== Personal life ==
Salley became an Australian citizen in 2008. He married his sweetheart Azra in 2010. The couple are the parents of two girls – Nahla, 15, and Ayla, 11.

== Career statistics ==
Appearances and goals by club, season and competition
| Club | Season | League | | | National cup | | Continental | | Other | | Total | |
| Club | Season | Division | Apps | Goals | Apps | Goals | Apps | Goals | Apps | Goals | Apps | Goals |
|---|---|---|---|---|---|---|---|---|---|---|---|---|
| South Melbourne | 2006 | Victorian Premier League | 9 | 1 | 0 | 0 | — | | — | | 9 | 1 |
| New Zealand Knights | 2006–07 | A-League | 10 | 0 | 5 | 0 | — | | — | | 15 | 0 |
| Sydney FC | 2006–07 | A-League | 1 | 0 | 0 | 0 | — | | — | | 1 | 0 |
| Adelaide United | 2007–08 | A-League | 17 | 0 | 5 | 0 | — | | — | | 22 | 0 |
| Adelaide United | 2008–09 | A-League | 14 | 0 | 3 | 0 | 6 | 0 | 1 | 0 | 24 | 0 |
| Adelaide United | Total | | 31 | 0 | 8 | 0 | 6 | 0 | 1 | 0 | 46 | 0 |
| Shaanxi Chanba | 2009 | Chinese Super League | 29 | 0 | 0 | 0 | — | | — | | 29 | 0 |
| Shaanxi Chanba | 2010 | Chinese Super League | 27 | 1 | 0 | 0 | — | | — | | 27 | 1 |
| Shaanxi Chanba | Total | | 56 | 1 | 0 | 0 | — | | — | | 56 | 1 |
| Chengdu Blades | 2011 | Chinese Super League | 25 | 0 | 0 | 0 | — | | — | | 25 | 0 |
| Gold Coast United | 2011–12 | A-League | 12 | 0 | — | | — | | — | | 12 | 0 |
| Shanghai Shenxin | 2012 | Chinese Super League | 28 | 3 | 1 | 0 | — | | — | | 28 | 3 |
| Guizhou Renhe | 2013 | Chinese Super League | 28 | 0 | 4 | 0 | 6 | 0 | — | | 38 | 0 |
| Guizhou Renhe | 2014 | Chinese Super League | 30 | 0 | 1 | 0 | 5 | 0 | 1 | 0 | 37 | 0 |
| Guizhou Renhe | Total | | 58 | 0 | 5 | 0 | 11 | 0 | 1 | 0 | 75 | 0 |
| Nei Mongol Zhongyou | 2015 | China League One | 27 | 1 | 1 | 0 | — | | — | | 28 | 1 |
| Nei Mongol Zhongyou | 2016 | China League One | 8 | 0 | 1 | 0 | — | | — | | 9 | 0 |
| Nei Mongol Zhongyou | Total | | 35 | 1 | 2 | 0 | — | | — | | 37 | 1 |
| Total | | | 265 | 6 | 21 | 0 | 17 | 0 | 1 | 0 | 304 | 6 |

== Honours ==
Guizhou Renhe

- Chinese FA Cup: 2013
- Chinese FA Super Cup: 2014
