= Paul Beekmans =

Dutch footballer (born 1982)

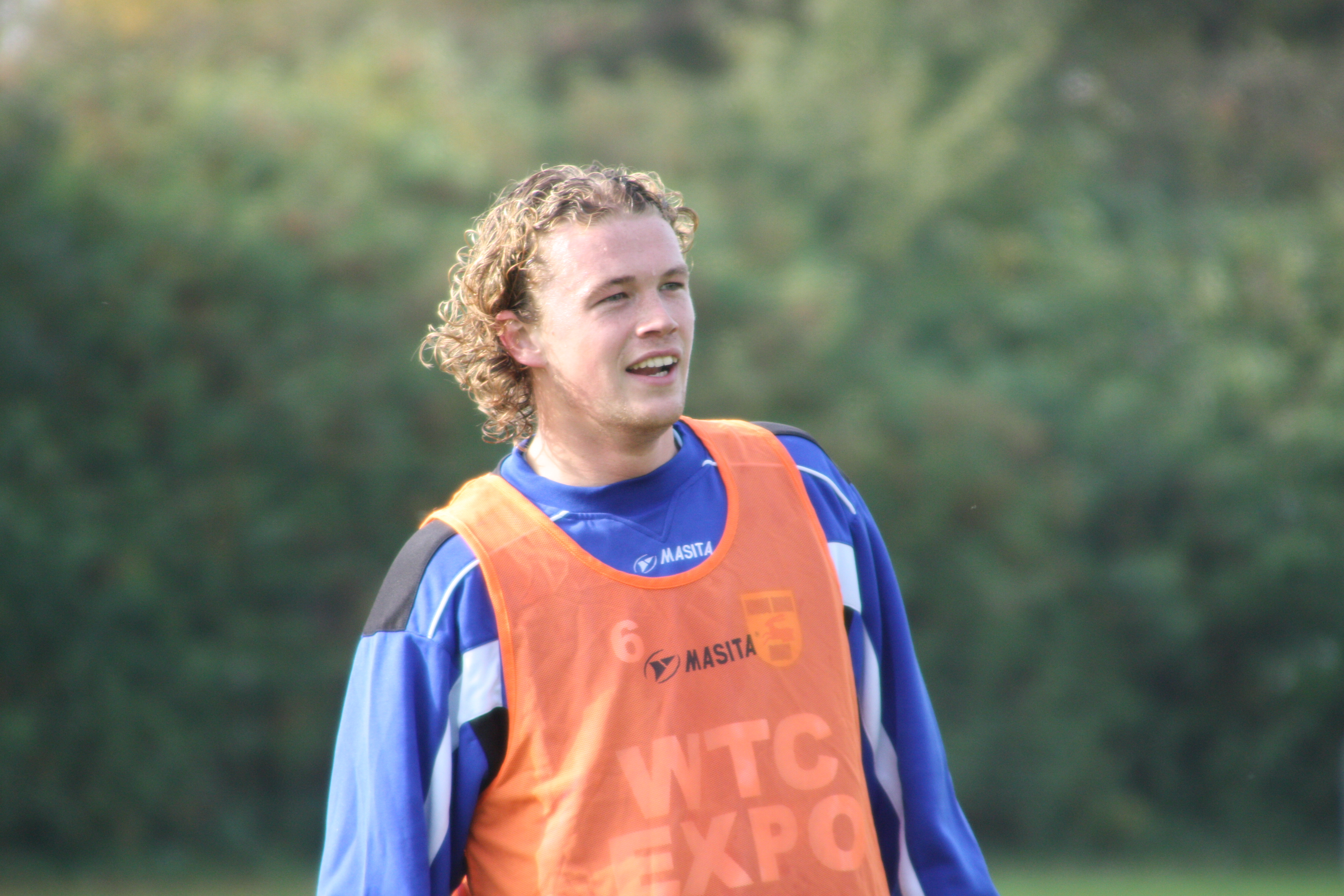

Personal information
- Date of birth: 3 January 1982 (age 44)
- Place of birth: Vught, Netherlands
- Height: 1.89 m (6 ft 2 1/2 in)
- Position: Defensive midfielder

Senior career*
Years	Team	Apps	(Gls)
2002–2008	FC Den Bosch	195	(23)
2008–2011	Cambuur	97	(6)
2011–2012	Gold Coast United	14	(0)
2012–2013	Almere City	13	(1)
2013–2015	Eindhoven	48	(3)
2015–2016	FC Den Bosch	7	(1)
Total		374	(34)

Managerial career
- 2016–2021: FC Den Bosch (assistant)
- 2021–2022: Eindhoven (assistant)
- * Club domestic league appearances and goals

Paul Beekmans (born 3 January 1982) is a Dutch football manager and former player who mainly played as a defensive midfielder.

== Club career ==
He formerly played for FC Den Bosch, SC Cambuur, Almere City FC, Eindhoven and Gold Coast United.

=== FC Den Bosch ===
Beekmans played in 195 games for FC Den Bosch, from 2002 until 2008 in the Eredivisie and Eerste Divisie and scored 23 goals. He returned to the club in summer 2015 as an amateur while also working as an account manager at the club.

=== SC Cambuur ===
Beekmans spent three seasons at SC Cambuur, playing 99 games for the team in the Eerste Divisie.

=== Gold Coast United ===
On 8 June 2011, Beekmans signed a contract with Australian A-League team Gold Coast United.

== Honours ==
Den Bosch

- Eerste Divisie: 2003–04
