= Ambesager Yosief =

Eritrean footballer

Ambes Yosief
Personal information
- Full name: Ambesager Sium Yosief
- Date of birth: 29 June 1984 (age 42)
- Place of birth: Asmara, Ethiopia
- Height: 1.83 m (6 ft 0 in)
- Positions: Left back; centre back

Senior career*
Years	Team	Apps	(Gls)
2011	Western Strikers	18	(1)
2011–2012	Gold Coast United	3	(0)
2012	Western Strikers	2	(0)
2015–2016	Western Strikers	37	(0)
2017	Adelaide Olympic	16	(3)
2018	Birkalla	7	(0)
2018	Croydon Kings	8	(0)
2019	Adelaide Raiders	11	(0)
2020	West Adelaide	2	(0)

International career^{‡}
2009	Eritrea	?	(?)
- * Club domestic league appearances and goals as of 23 December 2020 ‡ National team caps and goals as of 24 September 2012

Ambesager Yosief (born 29 June 1984) is an Eritrean footballer who plays for Adelaide Raiders.

== Club career ==
On 26 August 2011 he signed with A-League club Gold Coast United from FFSA Super League club Western Strikers. On 30 November 2011 he made his debut for Gold Coast United in a match against Newcastle Jets.

== International career ==
Yosief played in the 2009 CECAFA Cup in Kenya, appearing in the 4–0 quarter final defeat to Tanzania.

== Personal life ==
Whilst competing in the 2009 CECAFA Cup in Kenya he was part of the Eritrea national football team which failed to return home after competing in the regional tournament in Nairobi. After receiving refugee status from the Australian government, the team moved to Adelaide, Australia. He now works at Holmwood
