= Queensland Academy of Sport =

Australian institute for elite sporting athlete development

The Queensland Academy of Sport (QAS) is an elite sports institute set up in 1991 by the Queensland Government to support athletes in the state of Queensland. Its headquarters are currently located at the Queensland Sport and Athletics Centre in Nathan, Brisbane, Queensland.

== History ==
The Academy was opened in May 1991 to rival the other states' institutes of sport. They were headquartered at South Bank, South Brisbane, including with a sport science laboratory. A gymnasium was later added, then a North Queensland branch to support regional elite athletes. Inaugural scholarship holders included swimmers Susie O'Neill and Kieran Perkins, and short-track ice speedskater Steven Bradbury.

In 2004 the QAS moved to the Queensland Sport and Athletics Centre, Nathan, South Brisbane, "with facilities including a competition-standard athletics track, strength and conditioning gymnasium, state-of-the-art sport science laboratory, and nutrition training centre". SPIKE (Sport Performance Innovation and Knowledge Excellence) was introduced as a research hub collaboration with universities and industry.

In 2009, QAS changed to a primary focus on nine specific sports (athletics, canoeing, cycling, gymnastics, hockey, rowing, swimming, triathlon, and water polo), with collaborative relationships with state sporting organisations (including baseball, basketball, cricket, diving, football, golf, netball, rugby league, rugby union, sailing, softball, tennis, and volleyball).

In 2022 the gymnasium was undergoing a $9.8M refit, with "upgraded biomechanical and physiological testing, a blood lab, and an instrumented running track".

In 2025 the Para Unit was created, to provide talent identification, identify participation pathways, and develop athletes, in the approach to the Brisbane 2032 Summer Paralympics. Within one year, the QAS Para Unit was supporting 103 Para-athletes, including Raissa Martin (goalball) and the sport of alpine skiing.

That year also saw the Queensland Government establish the QAS as a statutory body to assist emerging and elite Queensland athletes achieve Olympic and Paralympic success, identify and foster talent, and collaborate with other sporting organisations and institutes.

== Programmes ==
The QAS has thirteen squads over ten sports. These programs include athletics, canoeing, cycling, gymnastics (men and women), hockey (men and women), netball, rowing, sailing, swimming, and water polo (men and women). By 2001 the Academy has supported over 580 athletes across twenty-four sports including rugby league, rugby union, and golf. QAS athletes have been successful at various Olympic and Paralympic Games, including Athens 2004 with 91 athletes achieving 60 medals, and for 2008 Beijing, 68 athletes with 25 medals representing 54% of Australia's medal tally.

In 1992 the QAS soccer programme commenced for elite youth players, working with Football Queensland including the "Emerging Female Program". QAS has many partnership programs with other team sports too including the Queensland Baseball Academy.

In early 2026, QAS talent scouts did regional visits using artificial intelligence software for real-time assessment of potential elite athletes.

== Notable alumni ==
- Katrin Borchert (born 1969), canoeing
- Steven Bradbury (born 1973), short-track speed skating
- Naomi Castle (born 1974), water polo
- Daniel Collins (born 1970), flatwater canoeing
- Natalie Cook (born 1975), volleyball
- Kenny Dougall (born 1993), soccer
- Jamie Dwyer (born 1979), field hockey
- Duncan Free (born 1973), rowing
- Grant Hackett (born 1980), swimming
- Jodie Henry (born 1983), swimming
- Leisel Jones (born 1985), swimming
- Robbie Kruse (born 1988), soccer
- Joyce Lester (born 1958), softball
- Cameron McEvoy (born 1994), swim
- Matt McKay (born 1983), football
- Anna Meares (born 1983), track cycling
- Tommy Oar (born 1991), football
- Susie O'Neill (born 1973), swimming
- Kieren Perkins (born 1973), freestyle swimming
- Kerri Pottharst (born 1965), volleyball
- Stephanie Rice (born 1988), swimming
- Chris Scott (born 1968), AWD cycling
- Emma Snowsill (born 1981), triathlon
- Samantha Stosur (born 1984), tennis
- Libby Trickett (born 1985), swimming
- Andrew Trim (born 1968), flatwater canoeing
- Ken Wallace (born 1983), sprint canoe
- David Williams (born 1988), soccer
- Vicki Wilson (born 1965), netball
