= 2010–11 Gold Coast United FC season =

Gold Coast United
2010–11 season
- Chairman: Clive Palmer
- Manager: Miron Bleiberg
- A-League: 3rd
- A-League Finals: Preliminary Final
- Top goalscorer: League: Bruce Djite (9); All: Bruce Djite (10)
- Highest home attendance: 14,783 vs Newcastle Jets (22 January 2011)
- Lowest home attendance: 1,658 vs Melbourne Heart (5 December 2010)
- Average home league attendance: 3,317 (20 February 2011)
Home colours	Away colours

The 2010–11 Gold Coast United season was Gold Coast United's second season in the A-League. They finished the regular season in third place, and were defeated by Central Coast Mariners in the Preliminary Final.

== Transfers ==
=== In ===
Date	Position	Nationality	Name	From	Fee	Ref.
16 June 2010	DF	(England)	John Curtis	Northampton Town	Free	
19 July 2010	GK	(New Zealand)	Glen Moss	Melbourne Victory	Free	
2 September 2010	FW	(Australia)	Bruce Djite	Gençlerbirliği	Free	
10 January 2011	FW	(New Zealand)	Shane Smeltz	Gençlerbirliği	Free	
16 January 2011	MF	(South Korea)	Kim Sung-kil	Busan Transportation Corporation	Free	
	MF	(Brazil)	Anderson	Criciúma	Free	

=== Out ===
Date	Position	Nationality	Name	To	Fee	Ref.
19 July 2010	GK	(Australia)	Jess Vanstrattan	Central Coast Mariners	Undisclosed	
29 July 2010	MF	(Australia)	Richard Greer			
24 August 2010	FW	(New Zealand)	Shane Smeltz	Gençlerbirliği	Undisclosed	

=== Loans in ===
Date from	Position	Nationality	Name	From	Date to	Ref.
22 December 2010	MF	(Germany)	Peter Perchtold	1. FC Nürnberg	10-games	

=== Trial ===
Date From	Date To	Position	Nationality	Name	Last club
14 May 2010	28 May 2010	DF	(England)	John Curtis	Northampton Town

=== Released ===
Date	Position	Nationality	Name	Joined	Date
23 February 2011	MF	(Australia)	Jason Culina	Newcastle Jets	23 February 2011

== Squad ==
As of match played 5 March 2011

No.	Name	Nationality	Position	Date of birth (Age (Note: Age as of the end of the season))	Signed from	Signed in	Contract ends	Apps.	Goals
Goalkeepers
1	Glen Moss	(Australia)	GK	19 January 1983 (aged 28)	Melbourne Victory	2010	2012	30	0
20	Scott Higgins	(Australia)	GK	9 June 1976 (aged 34)	Wellington Phoenix	2009		12	0
30	Jerrad Tyson	(Australia)	GK	21 September 1989 (aged 21)	Brisbane Strikers	2010		1	0
Defenders
3	Michael Thwaite	(Australia)	DF	2 May 1983 (aged 27)	Brann	2009		56	0
4	Daniel Piorkowski	(Australia)	DF	12 January 1984 (aged 26)	Newcastle Jets	2009	2011	2	0
6	Dino Djulbic	(Bosnia and Herzegovina)	DF	16 February 1983 (aged 28)	Rot Weiss Ahlen	2010		40	4
13	Bas van den Brink	(Netherlands)	DF	11 September 1982 (aged 28)	Omniworld	2009		50	4
16	Kristian Rees	(Australia)	DF	6 January 1980 (aged 31)	Adelaide City	2009	2011	52	2
22	Adama Traoré	(Ivory Coast)	DF	3 February 1990 (aged 21)	EF Yéo Martial	2009		42	2
24	John Curtis	(England)	DF	3 September 1978 (aged 32)	Northampton Town	2010	2011	19	1
29	Zac Anderson	(Australia)	DF	30 April 1991 (aged 19)	QAS	2009		5	0
	Ben Wearing	(Australia)	DF	8 May 1989 (aged 20)	Musgrave	2009		1	0
Midfielders
2	Steve Pantelidis	(Australia)	MF	17 August 1983 (aged 27)	Melbourne Victory	2009	2011	49	1
5	Robson	(Brazil)	MF	3 November 1986 (aged 24)	Cabofriense	2009		30	2
7	Zenon Caravella	(Australia)	MF	17 May 1983 (aged 27)	Omniworld	2009	2011	52	1
8	Anderson	(Brazil)	MF	10 January 1983 (aged 28)	Criciúma	2010	2011	48	0
10	Jason Culina	(Australia)	MF	5 August 1980 (aged 30)	PSV Eindhoven	2009	2012	44	8
17	Matthew Osman	(Australia)	MF	29 July 1983 (aged 26)	Central Coast Mariners	2009	2011	15	0
18	James Brown	(Australia)	MF	19 February 1990 (aged 21)	AIS	2009	2012	21	3
23	Steve Fitzsimmons	(Australia)	MF	7 September 1976 (aged 34)	Beenleigh	2009	2010	34	2
26	Ben Halloran	(Australia)	MF	14 June 1992 (aged 18)	QAS	2010		2	0
28	Mitch Bevan	(Australia)	MF	20 February 1991 (aged 20)	Brisbane Roar	2009		1	0
31	Joshua Brillante	(Australia)	MF	25 March 1993 (aged 17)	QAS	2010		5	0
32	Steven Lustica	(Australia)	MF	18 March 1976 (aged 34)	Sydney Youth	2010		2	0
33	Peter Perchtold	(Germany)	MF	2 September 1984 (aged 26)	loan from 1. FC Nürnberg	2010	2010	10	0
34	Kim Sung-kil	(South Korea)	MF	8 July 1983 (aged 27)	Busan Transportation Corporation	2010		1	0
Forwards
9	Shane Smeltz	(New Zealand)	FW	29 September 1981 (aged 29)	Gençlerbirliği	2010		38	28
11	Bruce Djite	(Australia)	FW	25 March 1987 (aged 23)	Gençlerbirliği	2010		23	10
14	Joel Porter	(Australia)	FW	25 December 1978 (aged 32)	Hartlepool United	2009		40	7
15	Tahj Minniecon	(Australia)	FW	13 February 1989 (aged 22)	AIS	2009	2012	35	1
19	Andrew Barisic	(Australia)	FW	22 March 1986 (aged 24)	Melbourne Knights	2009	2010	17	2
21	Golgol Mebrahtu	(Australia)	FW	28 August 1990 (aged 20)	Brisbane Strikers	2009		14	0
25	Chris Broadfoot	(Australia)	FW	11 April 1981 (aged 29)	Broadbeach United	2010		5	0
27	Chris Harold	(Australia)	FW	14 July 1992 (aged 18)	Brisbane Force	2010		10	1

== Competitions ==
=== A-League ===
==== League table ====
Pos	Team	Pld	W	D	L	GF	GA	GD	Pts	Qualification
1	Brisbane Roar (C)	30	18	11	1	58	26	+32	65	Qualification for 2012 AFC Champions League group stage and Finals series (Note: First place qualifies for the 2012 AFC Champions League group stage. Winning the 2011 A-League Grand Final automatically earns qualification for the 2012 AFC Champions League group stage, unless first place are champions. Second place qualifies for the 2012 AFC Champions League qualifying play-off, unless they qualify for the 2011 A-League Grand Final alongside first place or become A-League Champions, subsequently third place then qualify for the 2012 AFC Champions League qualifying play-off.)
2	Central Coast Mariners	30	16	9	5	50	31	+19	57	Qualification for 2012 AFC Champions League group stage and Finals series
3	Adelaide United	30	15	5	10	51	36	+15	50	Qualification for 2012 AFC Champions League qualifying play-off and Finals series
4	Gold Coast United	30	12	10	8	40	32	+8	46	Qualification for Finals series
5	Melbourne Victory	30	11	10	9	45	39	+6	43	Qualification for Finals series
6	Wellington Phoenix	30	12	5	13	39	41	−2	41	Qualification for Finals series
7	Newcastle Jets	30	9	8	13	29	33	−4	35	
8	Melbourne Heart	30	8	11	11	32	42	−10	35	
9	Sydney FC	30	8	10	12	35	40	−5	34	
10	Perth Glory	30	5	8	17	27	54	−27	23	
11	North Queensland Fury	30	4	7	19	28	60	−32	19	

Source: ultimatealeague.com
Rules for classification: 1) points; 2) goal difference; 3) number of goals scored.
(C) Champions

==== Results summary ====
Overall								Home						Away					
Pld	W	D	L	GF	GA	GD	Pts	W	D	L	GF	GA	GD	W	D	L	GF	GA	GD
30	12	10	8	40	32	+8	46	7	5	3	23	9	+14	5	5	5	17	23	−6

Last updated: 12 February 2011.
Source: See Results

==== Results ====
8 August 2010 1	Gold Coast United	0 – 0	Brisbane Roar	Gold Coast
15:00 AEST (UTC+10)	Traoré (yellow card) 23'; Pantelidis (yellow card) 27' van den Brink (yellow card) 41'; Rees (yellow card) 90'	Summary	Smith (yellow card) 82'	Stadium: Skilled Park; Attendance: 6,394; Referee: Peter Green

13 August 2010 2	Wellington Phoenix	3 – 3	Gold Coast United	Wellington
17:30 AEST (UTC+10)	Ifill 6'; Bertos (yellow card) 22'; Greenacre 37', 56'; Durante (yellow card) 48'; Sigmund (yellow card) 80'	Summary	Djulbic (yellow card) 18'; Smeltz 35', 74'; Thwaite (yellow card) 55'; Culina 88'; Minniecon (yellow card) 90'	Stadium: Westpac Stadium; Attendance: 8,398; Referee: Peter O'Leary

29 August 2010 3	Gold Coast United	0 – 1	Melbourne Victory	Gold Coast
15:00 AEST (UTC+10)	Rees (yellow card) 24'	Summary	Kruse 20'; Dugandzic (yellow card) 22'	Stadium: Skilled Park; Attendance: 3,624; Referee: Ben Williams

12 September 2010 4	Perth Glory	0 – 1	Gold Coast United	Perth
17:00 AEST (UTC+10)	Sterjovski (yellow card) 55'	Summary	Culina 23'; Fitzsimmons (yellow card) 34'; Thwaite (yellow card) 36'	Stadium: nib Stadium; Attendance: 10,450; Referee: Matthew Breeze

19 September 2010 5	Gold Coast United	0 – 0	Central Coast Mariners	Gold Coast
17:00 AEST (UTC+10)	Caravella (yellow card) 36'	Summary	Griffiths (yellow card) 21'; Pérez (yellow card) 76'; Zwaanswijk (yellow card) 85'	Stadium: Skilled Park; Attendance: 2,037; Referee: Matthew Gillett

22 September 2010 6	Gold Coast United	1 – 0	Newcastle Jets	Gold Coast
19:30 AEST (UTC+10)	Robson (yellow card) 61'; Curtis 90'	Summary		Stadium: Skilled Park; Attendance: 2,091; Referee: Peter Green

26 September 2010 7	Sydney	1 – 1	Gold Coast United	Sydney
15:00 AEST (UTC+10)	Cazarine 20'; Brosque (yellow card) 36'; Cole (yellow card) 45'	Summary	Rees (yellow card) 32'; Djite 45+1'; Thwaite (yellow card) 65'; Curtis (red card) 68'	Stadium: Sydney Football Stadium; Attendance: 9,977; Referee: Ben Williams

1 October 2010 8	Gold Coast United	3 – 1	Wellington Phoenix	Gold Coast
20:00 AEST (UTC+10)	Djite 6', 70'; Culina (yellow card) 22'; J.Brown (yellow card) 77' (goal) 82'; Pantelidis (yellow card) 90'	Summary	Ifill 9' (pen.); T.Brown (yellow card) 24'; Pavlović (yellow card) 81'	Stadium: Skilled Park; Attendance: 2,943; Referee: Matthew Gillett

17 October 2010 9	Gold Coast United	0 – 0	Adelaide United	Gold Coast
16:00 AEST (UTC+10)		Summary		Stadium: Skilled Park; Attendance: 2,389; Referee: Chris Beath

23 October 2010 10	Melbourne Heart	0 – 0	Gold Coast United	Melbourne
17:45 AEST (UTC+10)	Srhoj (yellow card) 52'; Worm (yellow card) 74'	Summary	van den Brink (yellow card) 35'; Curtis (yellow card) 88'; Brown (yellow card) 90'	Stadium: AAMI Park; Attendance: 6,150; Referee: Chris Beath

31 October 2010 11	North Queensland Fury	1 – 2	Gold Coast United	Townsville
17:00 AEST (UTC+10)	Hughes (yellow card) 13' (goal) 45'	Summary	Traoré 11'; Djulbic 85' (yellow card) 88'	Stadium: Dairy Farmers Stadium; Attendance: 7,195; Referee: Matthew Breeze

6 November 2010 12	Melbourne Victory	0 – 1	Gold Coast United	Melbourne
18:00 AEST (UTC+10)		Summary	Vargas 55' (o.g.); Moss (yellow card) 84'; Traoré (yellow card) 90+5'	Stadium: Etihad Stadium; Attendance: 15,534; Referee: Peter Green

12 November 2010 13	Gold Coast United	2 – 1	Sydney	Gold Coast
19:30 AEST (UTC+10)	Porter 15', 54'; Culina 44'; Pantelidis (yellow card) 38'; Traoré (yellow card) 81'	Summary	Cazarine 58'; Musialik (yellow card) 59'	Stadium: Skilled Park; Attendance: 2,536; Referee: Kris Griffiths-Jones

21 November 2010 14	Central Coast Mariners	2 – 3	Gold Coast United	Gosford
16:00 AEST (UTC+10)	Simon 42'; Kwasnik 71'; Lewis (yellow card) 82'	Summary	Djulbic 45' (yellow card) 65'; Pantelidis 70' (yellow card) 90+3'; Barisic 73'	Stadium: Bluetongue Stadium; Attendance: 9,732; Referee: Matthew Gillett

26 November 2010 15	Adelaide United	2 – 1	Gold Coast United	Adelaide
19:00 AEST (UTC+10)	Reid 10'; Dodd 47'	Summary	Djite (yellow card) 28' van den Brink 45+2'; J. Brown (yellow card) 16' (yellow-red card) 61'; Djulbic (yellow card) 73'	Stadium: Hindmarsh Stadium; Attendance: 12,005; Referee: Peter Green

1 December 2010 16	Gold Coast United	1 – 2	North Queensland Fury	Gold Coast
20:00 AEST (UTC+10)	Storey 9' (o.g.); Brillante (yellow card) 40'; Rees (yellow card) 75'	Summary	Williams 29'; Hingert (yellow card) 35'; Malik (yellow card) 43'; Talay 68'; Spagnuolo (yellow card) 90'	Stadium: Skilled Park; Attendance: 1,714; Referee: Matthew Breeze

5 December 2010 17	Gold Coast United	3 – 0	Melbourne Heart	Gold Coast
16:00 AEST (UTC+10)	van den Brink 41' (yellow card) 84'; Culina 58' (pen.), 77'	Summary	Beauchamp (yellow card) 57'; Zahra (yellow card) 65'	Stadium: Skilled Park; Attendance: 1,658; Referee: Jarred Gillett

11 December 2010 18	Gold Coast United	2 – 0	Wellington Phoenix	Gold Coast
20:15 AEST (UTC+10)	van den Brink 21'; Djulbic (yellow card) 51'; Brown 66' (yellow card) 70'; Barisic (yellow card) 84'; Rees (yellow card) 90'	Summary	Lia (yellow card) 27'; Sigmund (yellow card) 50'; Durante (yellow card) 52'; North (yellow card) 65'	Stadium: Skilled Park; Attendance: 1,716; Referee: Alan Milliner

15 December 2010 19	Newcastle Jets	2 – 0	Gold Coast United	Newcastle
18:00 AEST (UTC+10)	Wehrman (yellow card) 34'; Milicevic (yellow card) 51' (yellow-red card) 78'; Abbas 77'; Petrovski 82'	Summary	Pantelidis (yellow card) 19'	Stadium: EnergyAustralia Stadium; Attendance: 8,046; Referee: Ryan Shepheard

19 December 2010 (Note: Match was cancelled in the 20th minute on 19 December 2010 due to poor playing condition of the pitch. Replayed occurred on 9 February 2011) 20	Gold Coast United	0 – 0	Central Coast Mariners	Gold Coast
16:00 AEST (UTC+10)		Summary		Stadium: Skilled Park; Attendance: 10,147; Referee: Chris Beath

26 December 2010 21	Brisbane Roar	2 – 2	Gold Coast United	Brisbane
18:15 AEST (UTC+10)	Barbarouses 30'; Smith (yellow card) 41'; Solórzano 66' (pen.); Susak (yellow card) 90'	Summary	Djulbic 14'; Thwaite (yellow card) 33'; Robson 55'; Curtis (yellow card) 65'; Traoré (yellow card) 88'	Stadium: Suncorp Stadium; Attendance: 13,065; Referee: Chris Beath

3 January 2011 22	Gold Coast United	0 – 0	Perth Glory	Gold Coast
18:00 AEST (UTC+10)	Pantelidis (yellow card) 24'; Anderson (yellow card) 76'	Summary	Coyne (yellow card) 48'; Todd (yellow card) 76'	Stadium: Skilled Park; Attendance: 2,931; Referee: Peter O'Leary

8 January 2011 23	Sydney	2 – 0	Gold Coast United	Sydney
18:00 AEST (UTC+10)	Petratos 32'; Byun (yellow card) 65'; McFlynn (yellow card) 68'; Mäkelä 90'	Summary	van den Brink (yellow card) 60'; Fitzsimmons (red card) 64'	Stadium: Sydney Football Stadium; Attendance: 6,135; Referee: Chris Beath

14 January 2011 24	Gold Coast United	4 – 0	North Queensland Fury	Gold Coast
19:30 AEST (UTC+10)	Djite 22', 43'; Smeltz 52' van den Brink (yellow card) 53'; Harold 82'	Summary	Tavşancıoğlu (yellow card) 34'; Hingert (yellow card) 46'; Akoto (yellow card) 62'; Casey (yellow card) 77'; Hughes (yellow card) 86'	Stadium: Skilled Park; Attendance: 2,514; Referee: Matthew Gillett

19 January 2011 25	Melbourne Heart	1 – 1	Gold Coast United	Melbourne
19:00 AEST (UTC+10)	Alex 17'; Beauchamp (yellow card) 58'	Summary	Djite 40'; Perchtold (yellow card) 43'	Stadium: AAMI Park; Attendance: 5,187; Referee: Strebre Delovski

22 January 2011 26	Gold Coast United	5 – 1	Newcastle Jets	Gold Coast
20:15 AEST (UTC+10)	Traoré 9'; Pantelidis (yellow card) 22'; Djite 36', 79', 87' (yellow card) 81'; Smeltz 61'	Summary	Elrich (yellow card) 63'; Zhang 75'	Stadium: Skilled Park; Attendance: 14,783; Referee: Matthew Breeze

30 January 2011 27	Melbourne Victory	2 – 0	Gold Coast United	Melbourne
16:00 AEST (UTC+10)	Vargas (yellow card) 12'; Allsopp 25', 56'; Pondeljak (yellow card) 48'	Summary		Stadium: AAMI Park; Attendance: 8,287; Referee: Peter Green

2 February 2011 28	Gold Coast United	0 – 0	Adelaide United	Gold Coast
20:00 AEST (UTC+10)	Perchtold (yellow card) 33'	Summary	Hughes (yellow card) 37'; Reid (red card) 81'	Stadium: Skilled Park; Attendance: 2,138; Referee: Chris Beath

6 February 2011 29	Perth Glory	1 – 2	Gold Coast United	Perth
19:00 AEST (UTC+10)	Neville (yellow card) 21'; Burns (yellow card) 24'; Harnwell (yellow card) 31'; Taggart 75'	Summary	Smeltz 33' (pen.), 55' (pen.)	Stadium: nib Stadium; Attendance: 6,617; Referee: Jarred Gillett

9 February 2011 (Note: Match was cancelled in the 20th minute on 19 December 2010 due to poor playing condition of the pitch. Replayed occurred on 9 February 2011) 20	Gold Coast United	1 – 3	Central Coast Mariners	Gold Coast
16:00 AEST (UTC+10)	Barisic (yellow card) 61'; Smeltz 84'	Summary	Ibini-Isei 13'; Amini 40'; Duke 67'	Stadium: Skilled Park; Attendance: 2,037; Referee: Strebre Delovski

12 February 2011 30	Brisbane Roar	4 – 0	Gold Coast United	Brisbane
20:20 AEST (UTC+10)	Barbarouses 3'; Paartalu 41'; Henrique 65'; Broich 84'	Summary	Pantelidis (yellow card) 37'; Caravella (yellow card) 55'; Thwaite (yellow card) 87'	Stadium: Suncorp Stadium; Attendance: 20,831; Referee: Peter Green

=== A-League Finals ===
20 February 2011 2011Semi-Final 4 v 5	Gold Coast United	1 – 0	Melbourne Victory	Gold Coast
16:30 AEST (UTC+10)	Pantelidis (yellow card) 84'; Djulbic 90'	Summary	Angulo (yellow card) 87'	Stadium: Skilled Park; Attendance: 3,281; Referee: Strebre Delovski

27 February 2011 Minor Semi-Final	Adelaide United	2 – 3	Gold Coast United	Adelaide
16:30 AEST (UTC+10)	van Dijk 56' (pen.); Leckie 70'; Boogaard (yellow card) 77'	Summary	Smeltz 38', 79' (pen.) (yellow card) 38'; Djite (yellow card) 47' (goal) 71' van den Brink (yellow card) 54'; Pantelidis (yellow card) 82'	Stadium: Hindmarsh Stadium; Attendance: 15,028; Referee: Chris Beath

5 March 2011 Preliminary Final	Central Coast Mariners	1 – 0	Gold Coast United	Gosford
18:00 AEST (UTC+10)	Kwasnik 75'; Hutchinson (yellow card) 88'	Summary		Stadium: Bluetongue Stadium; Attendance: 7,539; Referee: Strebre Delovski

== Squad statistics ==
As of match played 5 March 2011

=== Appearances and goals ===
No.	Pos	Nat	Player	Total		A-League		A-League Finals	
No.	Pos	Nat	Player	Apps	Goals	Apps	Goals	Apps	Goals
1	GK	(New Zealand) NZL	Glen Moss	30	0	27	0	3	0
2	MF	(Australia) AUS	Steve Pantelidis	29	1	17+9	1	3	0
3	DF	(Australia) AUS	Michael Thwaite	28	0	25	0	3	0
5	MF	(Brazil) BRA	Robson	19	1	13+6	1	0	0
6	DF	(Bosnia and Herzegovina) BIH	Dino Djulbic	32	4	29	3	3	1
7	MF	(Australia) AUS	Zenon Caravella	28	0	22+3	0	3	0
8	MF	(Brazil) BRA	Anderson	22	0	17+2	0	3	0
9	FW	(New Zealand) NZL	Shane Smeltz	12	9	9	7	3	2
10	MF	(Australia) AUS	Jason Culina	18	5	18	5	0	0
11	FW	(Australia) AUS	Bruce Djite	23	10	20	9	3	1
13	DF	(Netherlands) NED	Bas van den Brink	23	3	19+2	3	2	0
14	FW	(Australia) AUS	Joel Porter	16	2	8+5	2	0+3	0
15	FW	(Australia) AUS	Tahj Minniecon	18	0	8+7	0	3	0
16	DF	(Australia) AUS	Kristian Rees	26	0	19+6	0	0+1	0
18	MF	(Australia) AUS	James Brown	12	2	9+3	2	0	0
19	FW	(Australia) AUS	Andrew Barisic	11	1	2+8	1	0+1	0
20	GK	(Australia) AUS	Scott Higgins	2	0	2	0	0	0
21	FW	(Australia) AUS	Golgol Mebrahtu	8	0	4+4	0	0	0
22	DF	(Ivory Coast) CIV	Adama Traoré	31	2	28+1	2	1+1	0
23	MF	(Australia) AUS	Steve Fitzsimmons	15	0	7+8	0	0	0
24	DF	(England) ENG	John Curtis	19	1	12+5	1	0+2	0
25	FW	(Australia) AUS	Chris Broadfoot	5	0	0+5	0	0	0
26	MF	(Australia) AUS	Ben Halloran	5	0	2+3	0	0	0
27	FW	(Australia) AUS	Chris Harold	10	1	2+7	1	0+1	0
29	DF	(Australia) AUS	Zac Anderson	2	0	0+2	0	0	0
30	GK	(Australia) AUS	Jerrad Tyson	1	0	1	0	0	0
31	MF	(Australia) AUS	Joshua Brillante	2	0	2	0	0	0
32	MF	(Australia) AUS	Steven Lustica	2	0	0+2	0	0	0
33	MF	(Germany) GER	Peter Perchtold	10	0	7	0	3	0
34	MF	(South Korea) KOR	Kim Sung-kil	1	0	1	0	0	0
Players who left Gold Coast United during the season:

=== Goal scorers ===
Place	Position	Nation	Number	Name	A-League	A-League Finals	Total
1	FW	(Australia)	11	Bruce Djite	9	1	10
2	FW	(New Zealand)	9	Shane Smeltz	7	2	9
3	MF	(Australia)	10	Jason Culina	5	0	5
4	DF	(Bosnia and Herzegovina)	6	Dino Djulbic	3	1	4
5	DF	(Netherlands)	13	Bas van den Brink	3	0	3
6	DF	(Australia)	18	James Brown	2	0	2
6	DF	(Ivory Coast)	22	Adama Traoré	2	0	2
6	FW	(Australia)	14	Joel Porter	2	0	2
6	MF	(Brazil)	5	Robson	2	0	2
10	DF	(England)	24	John Curtis	1	0	1
10	MF	(Australia)	2	Steve Pantelidis	1	0	1
10	FW	(Australia)	19	Andrew Barisic	1	0	1
10	FW	(Australia)	27	Chris Harold	1	0	1
10				Own goal	1	0	1
Total					40	4	44

=== Disciplinary record ===
Position	Nation	Number	Name	A-League		A-League Finals		Total	
Position	Nation	Number	Name	Yellow card	Red card	Yellow card	Red card	Yellow card	Red card
1	(New Zealand)	GK	Glen Moss	1	0	0	0	1	0
2	(Australia)	MF	Steve Pantelidis	8	0	2	0	10	0
3	(Australia)	DF	Michael Thwaite	5	0	0	0	5	0
5	(Brazil)	MF	Robson	1	0	0	0	1	0
6	(Bosnia and Herzegovina)	Df	Dino Djulbic	5	0	0	0	5	0
7	(Australia)	MF	Zenon Caravella	2	0	0	0	2	0
8	(Brazil)	MF	Anderson	1	0	0	0	1	0
9	(New Zealand)	FW	Shane Smeltz	1	0	1	0	2	0
10	(Australia)	MF	Jason Culina	1	0	0	0	1	0
11	(Australia)	FW	Bruce Djite	2	0	1	0	3	0
13	(Netherlands)	DF	Bas van den Brink	5	0	1	0	6	0
15	(Australia)	FW	Tahj Minniecon	1	0	0	0	1	0
16	(Australia)	DF	Kristian Rees	5	0	0	0	5	0
18	(Australia)	MF	James Brown	5	1	0	0	5	1
19	(Australia)	FW	Andrew Barisic	2	0	0	0	2	0
22	(Ivory Coast)	DF	Adama Traoré	4	0	0	0	4	0
23	(Australia)	MF	Steve Fitzsimmons	1	1	0	0	1	1
24	(England)	DF	John Curtis	2	1	0	0	2	1
31	(Australia)	MF	Joshua Brillante	1	0	0	0	1	0
33	(Germany)	MF	Peter Perchtold	2	0	0	0	2	0
Total				55	3	5	0	60	0
