= Gold Coast football club (disambiguation) =

The Gold Coast football club may refer to either:

- Gold Coast Football Club, an Australian rules football side who joined the Australian Football League in 2011 and the AFL Women's league in 2020.
- Gold Coast United FC an association football side that joined the A-League in the 2009–10 Season.
- Gold Coast Titans a rugby league side in the NRL.
