= Bruce Djite =

Australian business executive, former soccer player (born 1987)

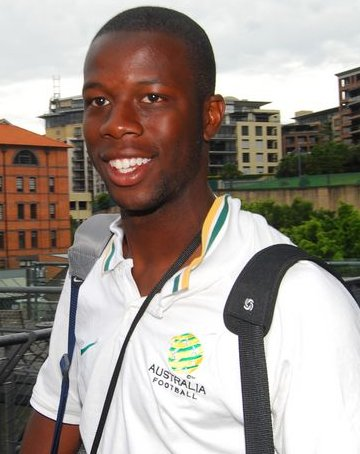
- Djite with Australia in 2008

Personal information
- Full name: Bruce José Djité
- Date of birth: 25 March 1987 (age 39)
- Place of birth: Arlington County, Virginia, United States
- Height: 1.83 m (6 ft 0 in)
- Position: Forward

Youth career
- 2003–2004: Northern Spirit
- 2005: NSWIS
- 2006: AIS
- 2004–2006: Marconi Stallions

Senior career*
Years	Team	Apps	(Gls)
2006–2008	Adelaide United	20	(6)
2008–2010	Gençlerbirliği	33	(6)
2010	→ Diyarbakırspor (loan)	9	(0)
2010–2011	Gold Coast United	23	(10)
2011–2016	Adelaide United	113	(29)
2011	→ Jiangsu Sainty (loan)	13	(4)
2016–2017	Suwon FC	39	(11)
2018	PSM Makassar	9	(0)
Total		259	(66)

International career
2006	Australia U20	13	(5)
2007–2008	Australia U23	13	(2)
2008–2015	Australia	9	(0)
- * Club domestic league appearances and goals

Bruce José Djité (French pronunciation: /ˈdʒɪˈteɪ/ JI-tay; born 25 March 1987) is an executive and former association football (soccer) player. As of April 2024 he is South Australian executive director of the Property Council of Australia.

Djite made a name for himself playing in the AFC Champions League, reaching the 2008 AFC Champions League final, and was named Australia League Young Footballer of the Year for 2008. He was the Gold Coast United all-time second highest goal scorer and Adelaide United all-time highest goal-scorer.

Although raised in Australia, Djité was born in the United States and played internationally for the Australia national team, debuting in 2008 and earning nine international caps, and has also played for clubs in Turkey, China, Korea, and Indonesia. In 2019 he returned to Adelaide United to become director of football for two years, and since then has occupied other executive positions in the business world.

== Early life and education ==
Bruce José Djité was born on 25 March 1987 in Arlington County, Virginia, United States. He moved to Sydney, Australia, with his parents when he was three years old, when his Ivorian-born father, Paulin, was appointed professor at the University of Western Sydney. His mother, Lyn, was born in Togo. He has two brothers.

Djite first played soccer during a four-month stay with his family in Ivory Coast in 1993, and loved it, so registered with his local amateur club. He later said "By the time I was 8 I knew soccer was all I wanted to do". He joined the Marconi Stallions in 2004 at the age of 16, after the demise of Northern Spirit FC, whom Djite signed for in 2002–03 National Soccer League season. He continued to play with Marconi Stallions until the end of the 2005–06 season (August 2006). He trained at the NSW Institute of Sport in Sydney.

Djite completed all of his schooling in Sydney, and then attended Macquarie University for six months, before being offered an Australian Institute of Sport football scholarship, which took him to Canberra for nine months. There, in 2006, he attended the FFA Centre of Excellence on a football scholarship with Nikita Rukavytsya.

He undertook a Bachelor of Business degree as an external student through Open Universities Australia, at the Griffith Business School at Griffith University over eight years, starting in 2011. He won Griffith Award for Academic Excellence, for maintaining a GPA of above 6.0.

== Club career ==
=== Adelaide United ===
==== 2006–07 season ====
In November 2006 at age 19 years old, Djite unsuccessfully trialled for two weeks at SV Werder Bremen of the Bundesliga in Germany. Upon his return to Australia, Djite signed for Adelaide United for the remainder of the 2006–07 A-League season, scoring three goals with an assist in thirteen matches.

==== 2007–08 season ====
Djite signed a three-year contract with Adelaide United in March 2007 and Djite scored his first goal for Adelaide United in a competitive fixture on 11 April 2007 in AFC Champions League against South Korea K-League champions Seongnam Ilhwa, deftly controlling the ball in the penalty box to volley it into the back of the goal net. Djite scored his first goal in the A-League for Adelaide United against Brisbane Roar in a 2–2 draw on 25 August 2007 at Suncorp Stadium in 2007–2008 A-League followed by Adelaide United reaching 2008 AFC Champions League final and Djite scoring an increased strike ratio of 10 goals in 22 matches.

=== Gençlerbirliği ===
Djite was bought by business magnate and Gold Coast United owner Clive Palmer from Turkish Süper Lig club Gençlerbirliği to re-play in the A-League in 2010–11 season, Djite had scored 10 goals and registered three assists in 23 matches for Clive Palmer's Gold Coast United.

==== 2008–09 season ====
On 15 May 2008, it was reported that Djite had been released from his contract with Adelaide United to sign for an unnamed European club. On 21 May 2008, Djite agreed to a three-year contract with Süper Lig club Gençlerbirliği in Turkey for the 2008–09 season.

Djite made his debut in the Süper Lig on 24 August 2008 in a 1–1 draw with Kocaelispor. Djite scored his first league goal for Gençlerbirliği in the 45th minute against Denizlispor on 25 October 2008. Fellow Australian James Troisi also got off the mark in a game which ended in a 2–2 draw. Djite consistently displayed his lethal acceleration, footspeed and strength in the penalty area and finished 2008–2009 Süper Lig season with 6 goals and two assists in twenty-eight matches played.

==== 2009–10 season ====
In the 2009–10 Süper Lig off-season, Djite revealed in an interview with FourFourTwo reporter Ben Somerford, the club Hajduk Split in Croatia were interested in his services but he rejected the move. Djite appeared on nine occasions on loan to Turkish club Diyarbakırspor and on five occasions for Gençlerbirliği with an assist in 2009–10 Süper Lig.

=== Gold Coast United ===
==== 2010–11 season ====
On 28 August 2010, it was announced by billionaire tycoon Clive Palmer that Djite would return home to Australia to play in the 2010–2011 A-League with Gold Coast United for 3 years, replacing New Zealand striker Shane Smeltz who had joined Gençlerbirliği. Djite was given the squad number 11 and Djite would unanimously be key to the success of Gold Coast United's attack utilizing his lightning footspeed, physical strength and aerial ability in the last third of the football pitch to score 10 goals and 3 assists in 23 matches including a fine hat-trick in the 37th, 80th and 87th minutes of Gold Coast's 5–1 win and 24th match of the 2010–2011 season at Skilled Park Stadium in Gold Coast against Newcastle Jets on 22 January 2011.

=== Adelaide United return ===
==== 2011–12 season ====
On 23 March 2011, it was announced that Djite had signed a two-year contract until April 2013 for two seasons, the 2011–12 and the 2012–13 seasons with the club that gave him his first A-League contract, Adelaide United.

Djite was given the squad number 11 and scored his first goal for Adelaide United in the 2011–12 A-League on 19 November 2011 by showing his exceptional footspeed and physical strength in the penalty area before sharply shooting past the goalkeeper Tony Warner and into the back of the goal net in the 44th minute of the 1–1 match draw against Wellington Phoenix at Westpac Stadium in New Zealand. Djite's five goals and two assists in twenty-four matches helped Adelaide United in qualifying for the 2012 AFC Champions League with the fifth and final goal being on 12 February 2012 at Skilled Park Stadium in the 42nd minute of Adelaide United's 20th 2011–12 season match and 2–1 win over Gold Coast United.

==== Loan to Jiangsu Sainty ====
In March 2011, due to the long 2011–2012 A-League off season, Adelaide United agreed for Djite to be loaned to Chinese Super League club Jiangsu Sainty.

Djite was given squad number 19 and debuted for Jiangsu Sainty in the 2011–2012 Chinese Super League season on 3 April 2011 in the match against Beijing Guoan. Djite scored his first goal in the 18th minute of the match, an equaliser for Jiangsu Sainty in a 1–1 draw against Henan Jianye on 30 April 2011, followed by the winning goal in the 55th minute of the match in a 1–0 win against Chengdu Blades on 18 June 2011. Djite scored 4 goals with an assist in 13 Chinese Super League matches, helping Jiangsu Sainty to 4th place in the league. He scored the fourth goal for Jiangsu Sainty in a 4–0 win against Dalian Shide on 2 July 2011, and played his 14th and last Chinese Super League match in a 1–0 win against Shanghai Shenxin on 6 July 2011.

==== 2012–13 season ====
Djite scored a header in the 90th minute and the 1–0 match winner in the 2012 AFC Champions League for Adelaide United against South Korea K-League club Pohang Steelers, heading the ball past goalkeeper Shin Hwa-Yong, The goal helped Adelaide United to top of 2012 AFC Champions League Group E on 4 April 2012 and into the 2012 AFC Champions League Round of 16, where Djite led the Adelaide United attack to defeat J.League club Nagoya Grampus 1–0 on 29 May 2012, and into 2012 AFC Champions League Quarter-finals on 3 October 2012.

On 1 December 2012, Djite scored for Adelaide United to lead 1–0 against reigning A-League champions Central Coast Mariners in the 17th minute shot from 51.5 m (169 ft) past the goalkeeper Justin Pasfield and into the left-hand corner of the net at Central Coast Stadium.

On 3 February 2013, Djite once again scored for Adelaide United against Western Sydney Wanderers on 61 minutes by dribbling past three Wanderers defenders and then taking a left-footed shot from 60.2 m (198 ft) past goalkeeper Ante Čović and into the right-hand corner of the net.

He finished two years and two seasons playing in Australia for Adelaide United in 2012–13 season with two goals and two assists in 17 2012–13 A-League appearances, and played 10 times, scoring once with two assists in the 2012 AFC Champions League.

=== Suwon FC ===
On 26 July 2016, after showing good form in Adelaide United's championship-winning season, Djite signed with Korean club Suwon FC, joining countryman Adrian Leijer.

=== PSM Makassar ===
In mid-2018, Djite moved to Indonesia, aged 31, and played for PSM Makassar.

== International career ==
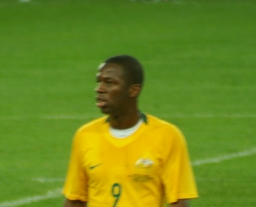
Bruce Djite playing for the Australia national football team.

Djite is an American Australian and chose to play for Australia, although he would also have been eligible for the Ivory Coast national football team, United States national football team and Togo national football team.

=== Australia U20 national team ===
Djite was a star striker for the Young Socceroos during their 2006 tournament in South America scoring five goals in thirteen caps and was also chosen in the Australia Under-20 squad to compete at the 2006 AFC Youth Championships, in India.

=== Australia Olympic team ===
Djite was the key striker and a mainstay in the Australia Olympic football team qualification matches for the 2008 Olympics and helped the Australia Olympic football team, the Olyroos squad, to qualify for the Beijing Olympics contributing thirteen caps and scoring two goals.

=== Australia national team ===
Three days before his 21st birthday, on 22 March 2008, Djite received his first international cap for the Australia national team, the Socceroos, against Singapore, courtesy of national coach Pim Verbeek, as the replacement for, and heir apparent to Mark Viduka for the Australia national football team. Djite was substituted on at half-time and his best chance to score a goal for Australia came when he rounded the Singapore goalkeeper but his shot in the penalty area was blocked by Lionel Lewis, the ball going out for a corner kick.

Djite's first cap for Australia in a competitive match was when he came on as a substitute for Harry Kewell in Australia's 2010 World Cup Qualifier against Iraq on 1 June 2008. Djite then again appeared in the Socceroos next match on 15 June 2008 against Qatar, coming on as a Super-sub for the 2010 World Cup Qualifier in Doha, Qatar.

He earned nine international caps.

== Playing style ==
"Bruce Djité is a fine football player, powerful and quick, intimidating and sharp around the penalty area. "Djité is a future Socceroo star, himself and many of his football colleagues are now multi-millionaires, playing in the most taxing of the world's professional football leagues."

— Les Murray, Order of Australia and FFA's Football Hall of Fame (Australia) speaking on Bruce José Djité.

As a player, Djite was known for his speed, strength and good height with ball heading skills and played in Turkey for professional football team, Gençlerbirliği S.K. of the Süper Lig.

Djité was a quick bustling left forward or striker with great footspeed and acceleration who kicks and shoots the ball well with either foot. He used his extreme physical strength and footspeed to out-run defenders in an A-League 2007–08 season, where he was crowned and awarded with the Rising Star Award, after scoring 10 goals in his first full season and then followed by registering six goals and two assists in his first Süper Lig 2008–09 season in Turkey. In 2011, Djité was among the top-goalscorers in the league, registering 10 goals and three assists in twenty-three matches.

== Other and later roles ==
Djite was a member of the Professional Footballers Australia Board between 2012 (then aged just 25) and 2016, and became involved in negotiating the whole-of-football collective bargaining agreement. During this time he also created an investment portfolio for himself, and worked as a commentator for Fox Sports.

In 2016, he worked part-time at PKF, an accounting firm in Adelaide, while playing for the Reds.

Djite was an ambassador for All Together Now, Australia's only national charity with the sole focus of erasing racism, for some time before 2019. As of 2019 he was an ambassador for Little Heroes Foundation, a South Australian charity that supports seriously ill children and their families, and Roger Rasheed's Sports Foundation.

On 3 June 2019, Djite returned to his former club, A-League side Adelaide United FC taking up the role of director of football. In the first six months in this role, the club won the FFA Cup and began their A-League campaign well. Djite signed two young newcomers, Al Hassan Toure and Louis D'Arrigo.

He left the role in July 2021 to become the CEO of the Committee for Adelaide.

On 30 November 2022, Djite was appointed as South Australian executive director of the Property Council of Australia. He remains in the role as of April 2024.

== Personal life ==
Djite is a multilingual, speaking French, English and Turkish.

He married, and had two children under five as of 2019.

== Career statistics ==
=== Club ===
Appearances and goals by club, season and competition
Club	Season	League (Note: Includes A-League final series)			Cup		Continental (Note: Includes AFC Champions League)		Total	
Club	Season	Division	Apps	Goals	Apps	Goals	Apps	Goals	Apps	Goals
Adelaide United	2006–07	A-League	8	0	2	0	5	1	15	1
Adelaide United	2007–08	A-League	12	6	5	3	3	1	20	10
Adelaide United	Total		20	6	7	3	8	2	35	11
Genclerbirligi	2008–09	Süper Lig	28	6	0	0	0	0	28	6
Genclerbirligi	2009–10	Süper Lig	5	0	0	0	0	0	5	0
Genclerbirligi	Total		33	6	0	0	0	0	33	6
Diyarbakırspor (loan)	2009–10	Süper Lig	9	0	0	0	0	0	9	0
Gold Coast United	2010–11	A-League	23	10	0	0	0	0	23	10
Jiangsu Sainty (loan)	2011	Chinese Super League	13	4	1	0	0	0	14	4
Adelaide United	2011–12	A-League	24	5	0	0	0	0	24	5
Adelaide United	2012–13	A-League	19	2	0	0	10	1	29	3
Adelaide United	2013–14	A-League	21	5	0	0	0	0	21	5
Adelaide United	2014–15	A-League	23	6	4	3	0	0	27	9
Adelaide United	2015–16	A-League	25	11	2	0	1	0	21	11
Adelaide United	Total		112	29	6	3	11	1	129	33
Career total			210	55	6	3	19	3	235	61

=== International ===
Bruce Djite: Professional Career Total
Teams	Appearances	Goals	Goals per game
Clubs	199	49	0.25
Australia Olympic team	13	2	0.15
Australia National team	9	0	0
Total	187	43	0.23
Updated to games played and goals scored 8 July 2015 (UTC)

== Honours ==
=== Adelaide United ===
- A-League Pre-Season Challenge Cup: 2007
- FFA Cup: 2014
- A-League Premiership: 2015–16
- A-League Championship: 2015–16

=== Individual ===
- A-League Young Footballer of the Year: 2007–08
- Rising Star Award: 2007–08
- Best Team Man Award: 2012–13

== See also ==
- List of Australia men's international soccer players born outside Australia

Awards
Preceded by Adrian Leijer	A-League; Young Player of the Year Award; 2007/08	Succeeded by Scott Jamieson
