= Property Council of Australia =

Australian national lobby group representing property developers and owners

The Property Council of Australia is a prominent industry organisation that represents the Australian property sector, advocating for its growth and positive impact on the nation. Founded in 1969, the Property Council operates across all major capital cities, plus Newcastle and Wollongong. The organisation produces industry advocacy, research, events and professional development for the property sector.

== History ==
It was formed as the Building Owners and Managers' Association of Australia (BOMA) c. 1966, incorporated in 1969, and assumed its current name in 1996.

Former Prime Minister Scott Morrison was the organisation's national policy and research manager from 1989 to 1995.

== Governance and organisation ==
The PCA is governed by a national board of directors, and there is a division for each state and territory as well as several special-focus divisions. As of April 2024 former professional footballer Bruce Djite is South Australian executive director.

== Activities and functions ==
The PCA engages in lobbying on a large scale, with its budgets in 2015 reported as including $6.4 million for advocacy, $1 million for communications, and $7.2 million for networking. It engaged in a major television campaign, "Don't Play With Property", ahead of the 2016 federal election seeking to preserve negative gearing. It has been a significant donor to both major political parties.

It has campaigned on a broad range of property-related issues, including opposing land tax increases, reducing stamp duty, opposing minimum apartment standards, reforming strata title, opposing increased fees for foreign property purchasers, and opposing land-clearing restrictions.
