= Jacob Borg =

Maltese footballer

Personal information
- Full name: Jacob Dominico Borg
- Date of birth: 22 May 1991 (age 35)
- Place of birth: Wollongong, Australia
- Height: 1.81 m (5 ft 11 in)
- Positions: Central defender; defensive midfielder

Youth career
- 2011–2012: Gold Coast United

Senior career*
Years	Team	Apps	(Gls)
2011–2012	Dandaloo FC		
2012–2013	Balzan	24	(0)
2013–2014	Sliema Wanderers	26	(0)
2014–2016	Żebbuġ Rangers		
2016–2017	Gżira United	29	(1)
2017–2018	Balzan	11	(1)
2018–2019	Finn Harps	40	(1)

International career^{‡}
- Australia U20
2013	Malta	1	(0)
- * Club domestic league appearances and goals as of 09:04, 2 November 2018 (UTC) ‡ National team caps and goals as of 14 September 2013

Jacob Dominico Borg (born 22 May 1991) is a professional footballer who last played as a defender for Finn Harps. Born in Australia, he represented the Malta national team.

== Early life ==
Borg was born in Wollongong, New South Wales and spent his early life in the Illawarra region.

== Career ==
After stints with the Gold Coast FC youth team and the Dandaloo FC, Borg moved to Malta, where he held citizenship by descent, to try his luck. In 2012, he signed with Balzan.

In July 2018, he joined Finn Harps in the League of Ireland First Division.

== International career ==
Borg was a member of the Australian squad that played at the 2009 Australian Youth Olympic Festival, playing in all three Australian matches at the tournament.

Soon after moving to Malta, he was called up to the Malta squad that played Northern Ireland in February 2013, though he didn't make his debut until September of that year in a friendly match against Azerbaijan.
