= Kim Sung-kil (footballer) =

South Korean footballer (born 1983)

Kim Sung-Kil
Personal information
- Full name: Kim Sung-Kil
- Date of birth: July 8, 1983 (age 43)
- Place of birth: South Korea
- Height: 1.75 m (5 ft 9 in)
- Positions: Fullback; wingback; midfielder

Senior career*
Years	Team	Apps	(Gls)
2002–2003	Oita Trinita	0	(0)
2003	Ulsan Hyundai Horang-i	1	(0)
2004–2005	Gwangju Sangmu Bulsajo	19	(0)
2006–2009	Gyeongnam FC	53	(1)
2009–2010	Busan Transportation Corporation	9	(0)
2011	Gold Coast United	1	(0)
- * Club domestic league appearances and goals as of 4 August 2011

Kim Sung-Kil (Korean: 김성길; born July 8, 1983) is a footballer who played in South Korea and Australia. Kim previously played for Japanese side Oita Trinita. He also played for Ulsan Hyundai Horang-i, Gwangju Sangmu Bulsajo and Gyeongnam FC in the K-League.

== Club honours ==
At Gyeongnam FC

- League Cup third place: 1

2006

- Korean FA Cup runner-up: 1

2008
