= Kristian Rees =

Australian soccer player

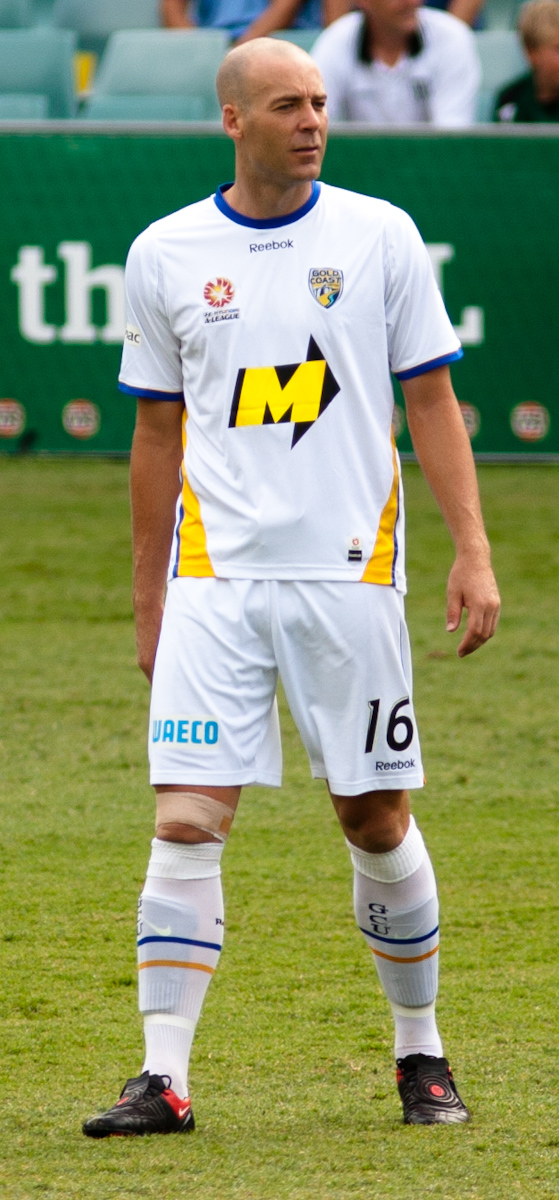
- Rees playing for Gold Coast United in 2010
- Born: Kristian Rees; 6 January 1980 (age 46); Adelaide, Australia
- Height: 1.93 m (6 ft 4 in)
- Political party: United Australia
Association football career
- Position: Centre back
Youth career
- Salisbury United
Senior career*
Years	Team	Apps	(Gls)
1998	Salisbury United	21	(5)
1999	Para Hills	21	(0)
2000–2003	Adelaide City Force	40	(0)
2003	Adelaide City	15	(1)
2003–2004	Adelaide United	26	(0)
2004	→ Modbury Jets (loan)	15	(1)
2005–2007	Adelaide United	35	(2)
2007	Whittlesea Zebras	26	(2)
2007–2008	Wellington Phoenix	9	(1)
2008	Adelaide City	20	(3)
2009–2012	Gold Coast United	73	(4)
2014–2015	Palm Beach	37	(7)
- * Club domestic league appearances and goals as of 19 September 2015

Kristian Rees (born 6 January 1980 in Adelaide, South Australia) is an Australian soccer player who plays as a central defender.

== Club career ==
He made his NSL debut playing for Adelaide City. He was also a member of Adelaide United's minor-premiership winning squad of 2005/06 and of the team that came runners-up in 2006/07.

He played for Adelaide United in the Hyundai A-League for the first 2 seasons of the competition, including during their inaugural foray into the Asian Champions League.

He was released by the club to the surprise of many at the end of the 2006/07 season, and joined Whittlesea Zebras in the Victorian Premier League. He made his debut for the Zebras against Green Gully on 3 June 2007 and has been one of the stand-out players in the league, leading the previously struggling Zebras to a spot in the Grand Final. Such was his impact that despite joining the Zebras after the start of the season, he still won the Club Best & Fairest Award, and though the team could not manage to beat Preston Lions in the Grand Final, Rees capped off a magnificent season by scoring his team's goal in the final, and also hit the crossbar. He was also selected for the Victorian State Team tour of China but unfortunately work commitments prevented him from taking up the spot.

On 13 November 2007 Rees signed for A-League club Wellington Phoenix until the end of the season where he joined up with former Adelaide United teammate and captain, Ross Aloisi. At the end of the 2007-2008 A-league season, Rees and Phoenix could not agree terms to extend his contract in Wellington, and after turning down the opportunity to join Chinese Super League club, Liaoning FC, he returned to Adelaide City to link up with former teammate, Damian Mori.

On 3 December 2008 he was signed to a two-year contract by Gold Coast United.

Rees ended his playing career with Palm Beach SC after a successful run in the FFA Cup playing alongside former Wellington Phoenix teammate Karl Dodd. Rees wasn't retired for 6 months before being lured out of retirement by the Sharks.

== Political career ==
Rees is a member of the United Australia Party (formerly known as the Palmer United Party), a right-wing political party founded by billionaire mining magnate Clive Palmer in 2013. Palmer was also the owner of Gold Coast United FC, a club that Rees played for before it left the A-League in 2012 (when Palmer's license was revoked by the FFA).

In the 2013 Australian federal election, Rees ran as the party's candidate for the Division of Grey, and in the 2016 Australian federal election, was the lead candidate for the Senate for South Australia.

Rees also ran in the 2015 Queensland state election as the party's candidate for Currumbin.

Rees again contested the Senate for South Australia as the party's lead candidate in 2019. He was also appointed to the party's frontbench as the Shadow Minister for Community Services.

== Honours ==
With Adelaide United:

- (Australia) A-League Premiership: 2005-2006
