= Dino Djulbic =

Soccer player (born 1983)

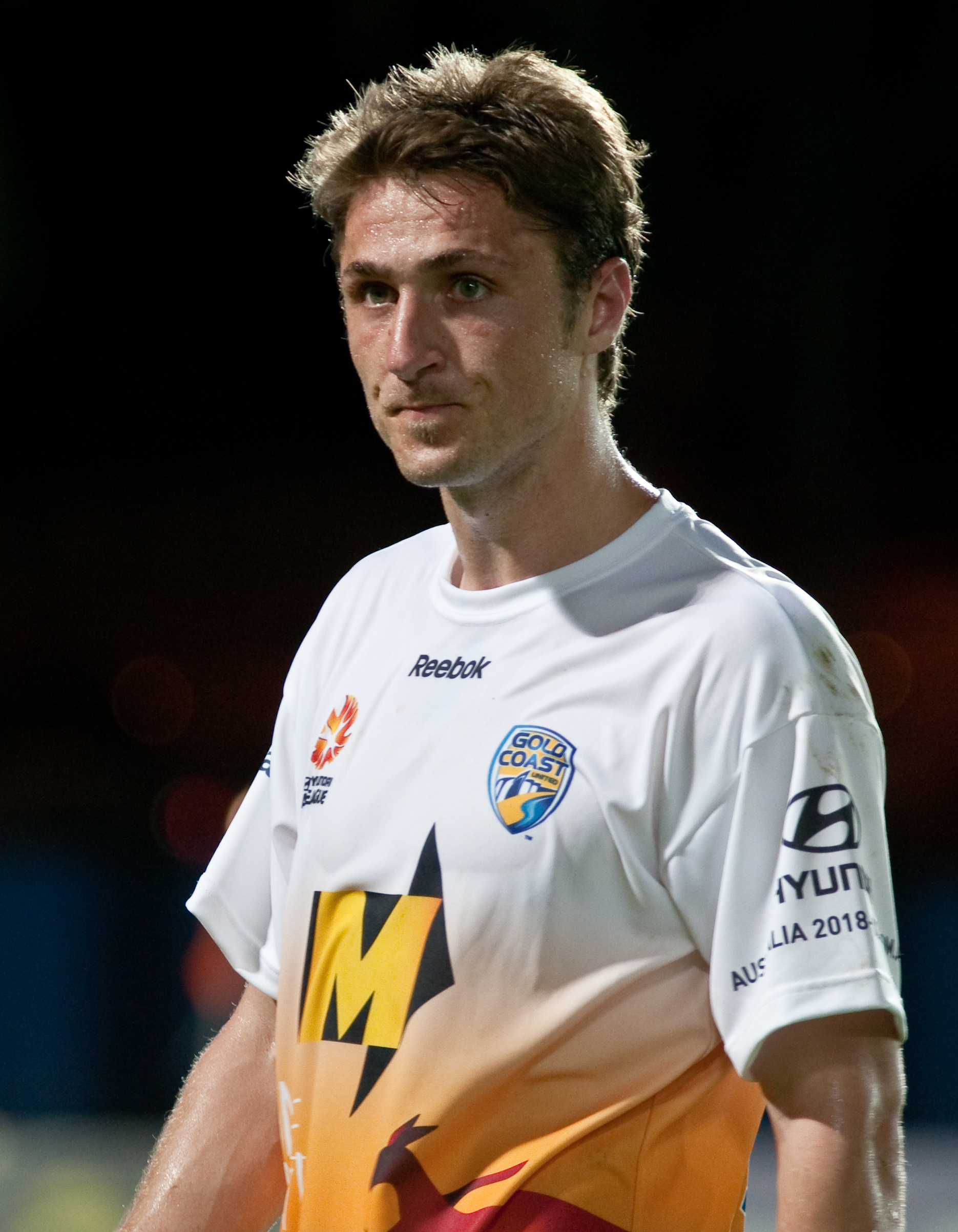
- Đulbić playing for Gold Coast United in 2010

Personal information
- Date of birth: 16 February 1983 (age 43)
- Place of birth: Doboj, SFR Yugoslavia
- Height: 1.84 m (6 ft 0 in)
- Position: Centre-back

Youth career
- –1995: BSV Beckum
- 1995–1999: LR Ahlen
- 1999–2001: Perth SC

Senior career*
Years	Team	Apps	(Gls)
2001–2005	Perth SC		
2006	Frankston Pines		
2006–2007	South Melbourne	30	(1)
2007–2009	Perth Glory	27	(0)
2009	Rot Weiss Ahlen	1	(0)
2010–2011	Gold Coast United	36	(3)
2011–2012	Guizhou Renhe	55	(8)
2013–2014	Al-Wahda	15	(3)
2014–2017	Perth Glory	55	(3)
2017–2018	Felda United	8	(0)
2018	Melbourne Victory	3	(0)
2018–2020	Perth Glory	31	(1)
Total		261	(19)

International career
2012	Australia	2	(0)
- * Club domestic league appearances and goals

Dino Djulbic (born 16 February 1983) is a former professional footballer who played as a centre-back. Born in the former Socialist Federal Republic of Yugoslavia, he made two appearances for the Australia national team.

== Club career ==
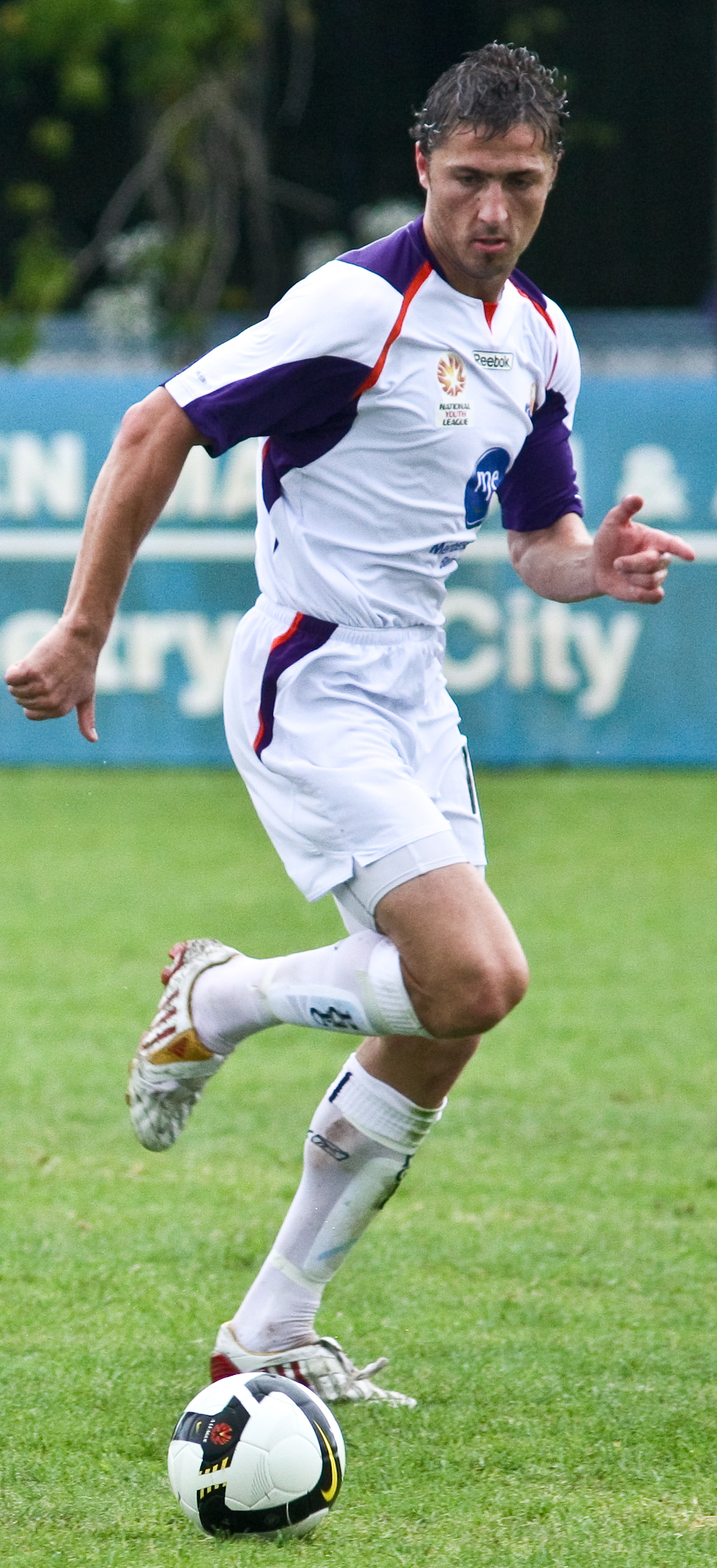
Djulbic playing for Perth Glory

=== South Melbourne FC ===
Djulbic was signed by South midway through the 2006 season from Frankston Pines as a defensive reinforcement.

Whilst playing for South Melbourne FC in 2006, Djulbic won a Victorian Premier League Champions medal with a stunning defensive performance against Altona Magic in the Grand Final. His performances throughout the season led him to becoming a fan favourite at Lakeside.

Following a successful season at South Melbourne, Djulbic attracted attention from various A-League sides before impressing the Perth Glory coaching staff when on trial with the club in 2006 and was subsequently signed. Djulbic played the first half of the 2007 season with South Melbourne before departing upon his contract with Perth Glory beginning. His last game was against Preston Lions in round 12 at Lakeside Stadium.

=== Perth Glory ===
The 24-year-old was a standout player for the club in his first A-League season and featured prominently in the club's best and fairest award, the Most Glorious Player (MGP Award), coming third behind Nikolai Topor-Stanley and Jamie Coyne. On 31 August 2008, in a match against Sydney FC, Djulbic received a red card for unsporting conduct towards referee Peter Green. He was suspended for five games.

On 20 January 2009, Djulbic signed with German 2. Bundesliga club Rot Weiss Ahlen and returned to his former youth club.

On 30 December 2009, Djulbic left Germany to join Gold Coast United for the last seven games of the club's inaugural season. He appeared in the club's only 2009–10 final, and continued to be a regular starter in the 2010–11 season, contributing three goals whilst helping maintain Gold Coast's solid defence.

Towards the end of the 2010–11 A-League season, Djulbic partook in discussions with Chinese Super League club Shaanxi Renhe Commercial Chanba F.C. He reportedly signed a two-year deal with the club and played his first match on 3 April 2011. The club later changed its name to Guizhou Renhe after moving to Guizhou. Djulbic was rewarded for consistent performance and being a crucial part of Guizhou's AFC Champions League ambitions by making the CSL's XI (All Star Team 2012).

At the conclusion of the 2012 CSL season, Djulbic signed with Al-Wahda S.C.C. on a one-and-a-half-year deal with the Abu Dhabi club.

In the off-season of 2014, Djulbic returned to the A-League, signing again with Perth Glory. After three more seasons with the club he announced he was leaving the Glory in May 2017 to sign with Malaysia Super League club Felda United.

In January 2018, Djulbic returned once more to the A-League, joining Melbourne Victory on a short-term deal as a replacement for the injured James Donachie and for Thomas Deng who was called up to the national under-23 team. After playing three games for Melbourne Victory, Djulbic was released following Deng's return. A week later, Djulibc joined Perth Glory again. Djulbic was released at the end of the 2019–20 A-League.

== International career ==
Dino was born in Bosnia and Herzegovina, but immigrated to Australia via Germany at the age of 16 years and was later naturalized as an Australian. In 2012 during the 2013 EAFF East Asian Cup qualifiers, Djulbic made his Australian national team debut when he featured in two of the Socceroo's Preliminary Round 2 matches against Guam and Chinese Taipei.

== Career statistics ==
Appearances and goals by club, season and competition
Club	Season	League			National cup		League cup (Note: Includes Malaysia Cup, UAE League Cup.)		Other		Total	
Club	Season	Division	Apps	Goals	Apps	Goals	Apps	Goals	Apps	Goals	Apps	Goals
Perth Glory	2007–08	A-League	18	0	—		—		5 (Note: Appearances in A-League Pre-Season Challenge Cup)	0	23	0
Perth Glory	2008–09	A-League	9	0	—		—		2	0	11	0
Perth Glory	Total		27	0	—		—		7	0	34	0
Rot Weiss Ahlen	2009–10	2. Bundesliga	1	0	0	0	—		—		1	0
Gold Coast United	2009–10	A-League	7	0	—		—		1 (Note: Appearance(s) in A-League Finals)	0	8	0
Gold Coast United	2010–11	A-League	29	3	—		—		3	1	32	4
Gold Coast United	Total		36	3	—		—		4	1	40	4
Shaanxi Renhe/ Guizhou Renhe	2011	Chinese Super League	26	3	2	0	—		—		28	3
Shaanxi Renhe/ Guizhou Renhe	2012	Chinese Super League	29	5	5	1	—		—		34	6
Shaanxi Renhe/ Guizhou Renhe	Total		55	8	7	1	—		—		62	9
Al Wahda FC	2012–13	UAE Pro League	13	2	2	0	2	0	—		17	2
Al Wahda FC	2013–14	UAE Pro League	2	1	0	0	1	0	—		3	1
Al Wahda FC	Total		15	3	2	0	3	0	—		20	3
Perth Glory	2014–15	A-League	26	3	3	0	—		—		29	3
Perth Glory	2015–16	A-League	9	0	5	0	—		1	0	15	0
Perth Glory	2016–17	A-League	20	0	2	2	—		2	0	24	2
Perth Glory	Total		55	3	10	2	—		3	0	68	5
Felda United	2017	Malaysia Super League	8	0	0	0	0	0	—		8	0
Melbourne Victory	2017–18	A-League	3	0	0	0	—		—		3	0
Perth Glory	2017–18	A-League	8	0	—		—		—		8	0
Perth Glory	2018–19	A-League	20	1	1	0	—		2	0	23	1
Perth Glory	2019–20	A-League	3	0	0	0	—		0	0	3	0
Perth Glory	Total		31	1	1	0	—		2	0	33	1
Career total			231	18	20	3	3	0	16	1	270	22

== Honours ==
South Melbourne

- Victorian Premier League: 2006

Perth Glory

- A-League Premiership: 2018–19
