= Peter Perchtold =

German footballer (born 1984)

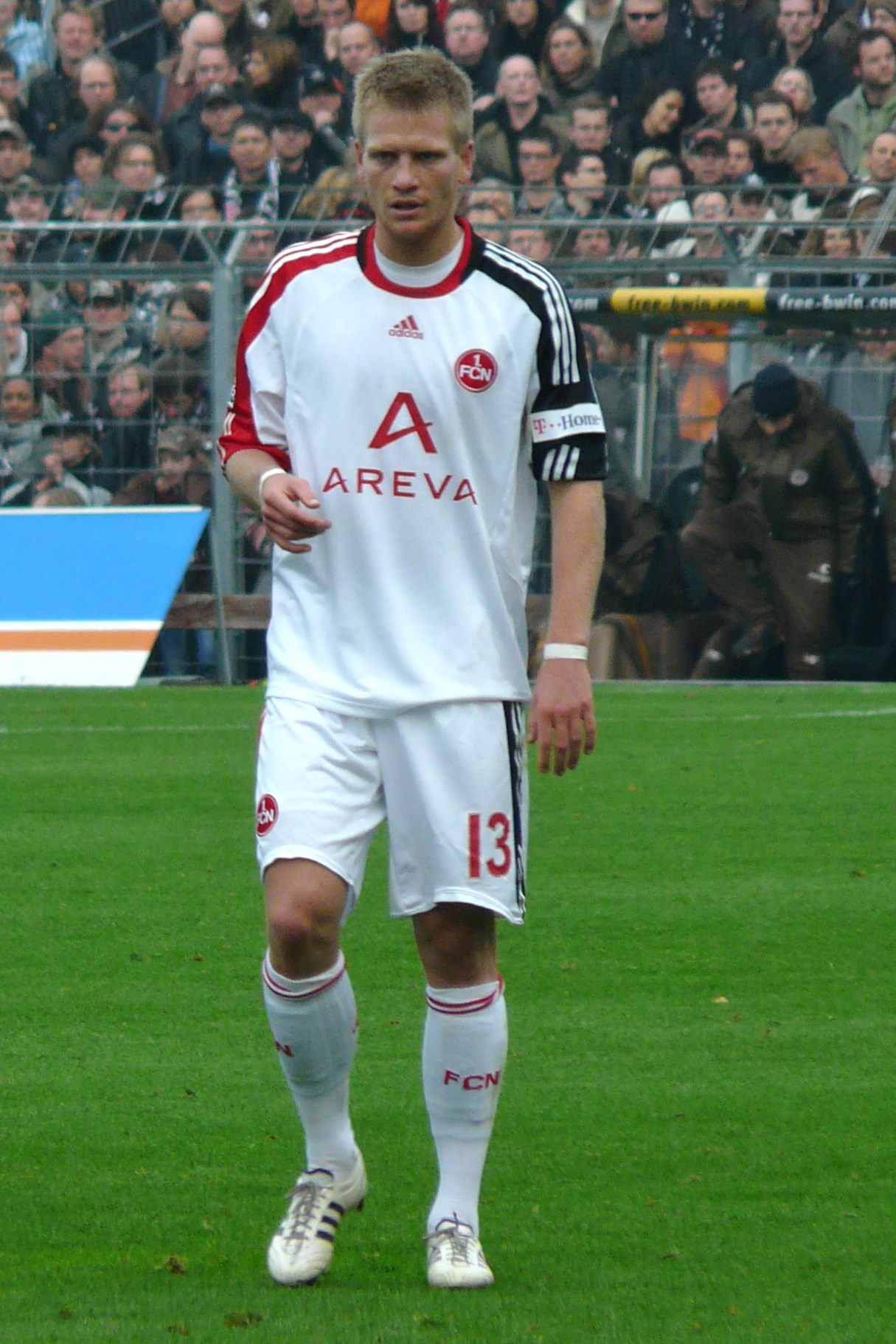
- Perchtold with 1. FC Nürnberg in 2008

Personal information
- Full name: Peter André Perchtold
- Date of birth: 2 September 1984 (age 42)
- Place of birth: Nuremberg, West Germany
- Height: 1.89 m (6 ft 2 in)
- Position: Midfielder

Team information
- Current team: Austria (assistant coach)

Youth career
- 1992–2003: 1. SC Feucht

Senior career*
Years	Team	Apps	(Gls)
2003–2005	1. SC Feucht	32	(7)
2005–2008	VfB Stuttgart II	90	(22)
2007	VfB Stuttgart	2	(0)
2008–2009	1. FC Nürnberg	15	(1)
2010	1. FC Nürnberg II	2	(0)
2011	Gold Coast United	10	(0)
2011–2013	Mainz 05 II	2	(0)
Total		153	(30)

Managerial career
- 2013–2015: Mainz 05 II (assistant)
- 2015–2017: Mainz 05 (assistant)
- 2017–2019: Schalke 04 (assistant)
- 2020–2022: VfB Stuttgart (assistant)
- 2022–: Austria (assistant)
- * Club domestic league appearances and goals

Peter André Perchtold (born 2 September 1984) is a German football coach and former player who played as a midfielder and he is the currently assistant coach of the Austria national team.

== Club career ==
Perchtold was born in Nuremberg. In October 2007, he was promoted to the first team of VfB Stuttgart. He had his professional debut on 20 October 2007 against Hamburger SV.

In July 2008, he moved to 1. FC Nürnberg.

In January 2011, he moved to A-League club Gold Coast United. He was sacked by Gold Coast United for not agreeing to cancel the final year of his two-year contract. In December 2011, an arbitrator ruled against Gold Coast United in this case and damages were awarded to Perchtold – including an amount for the impact to Perchtold's career due to the unfair sacking.

In July 2011, he joined Mainz 05 II and was made the side's captain. He was suspended until the end of August 2011 (four matches) after receiving a red card in his first match where his team lost 2–1 to Essen in round 1 of the Regionalliga West 2011–12 season.

== Coaching career ==
In 2013 he became assistant coach of Martin Schmidt at Mainz 05 II. Two years later, Perchtold got the same position in the Bundesliga team of Mainz 05. He joined Schalke 04 as an assistant to Domenico Tedesco in 2017. In 2020, Perchtold became an assistant coach to Pellegrino Matarazzo at VfB Stuttgart.
