= Footspeed =

Maximum speed that a human can run

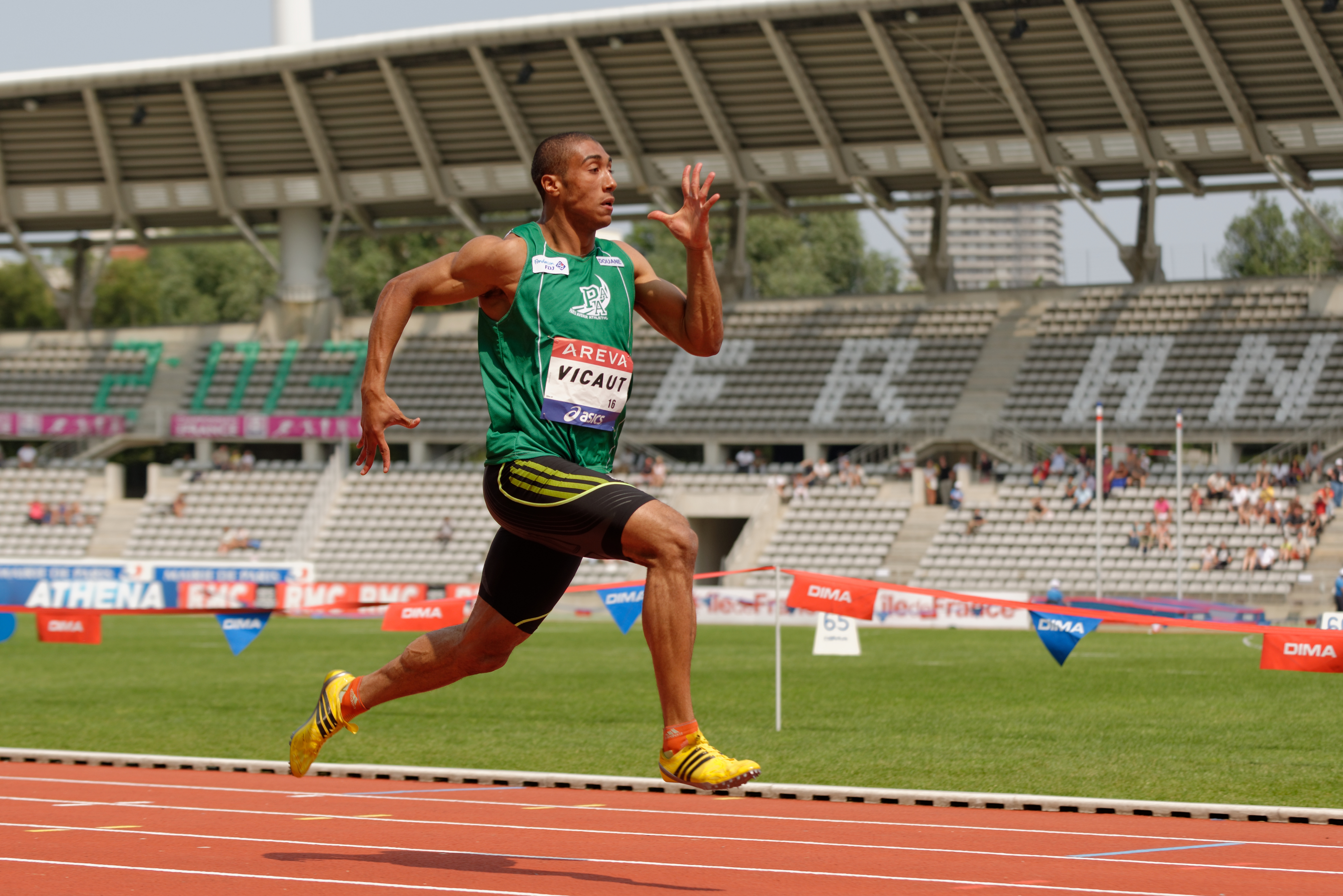
Sprinting is a sport that requires development of footspeed.

Footspeed, or sprint speed, is the maximum speed at which a human can run. It is affected by many factors, varies greatly throughout the population, and is important in athletics and many sports, such as association football, Australian rules football, American football, track and field, field hockey, tennis, baseball, and basketball.

== Factors in speed ==
The key determinant of footspeed in sprinting is the predominance of one distinct type of muscle fibre over another, specifically the ratio of fast-twitch muscles to slow-twitch muscles in a sprinter's physical makeup. Though fast-twitch muscles produce no more energy than slow-twitch muscles when they contract, they do so more rapidly through a process of anaerobic metabolism, though at the cost of inferior efficiency over longer periods of firing. The average human has an almost-equal ratio of fast-twitch to slow-twitch fibers, but top sprinters may have as much as 80% fast-twitch fibers, while top long-distance runners may have only 20%. This ratio is believed to have genetic origins, though some assert that it can be adjusted by muscle training. "Speed camps" and "Speed Training Manuals", which purport to provide fractional increases in maximum footspeed, are popular among budding professional athletes, and some sources estimate that 17–19% of speed can be trained. Though good running form is useful in increasing speed, fast and slow runners have been shown to move their legs at nearly the same rate – it is the force exerted by the leg on the ground that separates fast sprinters from slow. Top short-distance runners exert as much as four times their body weight in pressure on the running surface. For this reason, muscle mass in the legs, relative to total body weight, is a key factor in maximizing footspeed.

== Limits of speed ==
The record is 44.72 km/h (27.78 mph), measured between metre 60 and metre 80 of the 100 metres sprint at the 2009 World Championships in Athletics by Usain Bolt. (Bolt's average speed over the course of this race was 37.578 km/h or 23.35 mph.) Compared to quadrupedal animals, humans are exceptionally capable of endurance, but incapable of great speed. Examples of animals with higher sprinting speeds include cheetahs which can attain short bursts of speed well over 100 km/h (62 mph), the American quarter horse has topped 88 km/h (55 mph), greyhounds can reach 70 km/h (43 mph), and the Mongolian wild ass has been measured at 64 km/h (40 mph). The domestic cat may reach 48 km/h (30 mph).

At the 2023 Chicago Marathon, Kelvin Kiptum set a time of 2:00:35, which equates to an average speed of 20.995 km/h (13.046 mph) throughout.

== See also ==
- Walking speed, the normal pace humans walk.

== Notes ==
- Stipp, David (4 June 2012). "All men can't jump". Slate.
- Resnick, Brian (November 5, 2010). "The animal kingdom's top marathoners". Popular Mechanics.
