= Bas van den Brink =

Dutch footballer

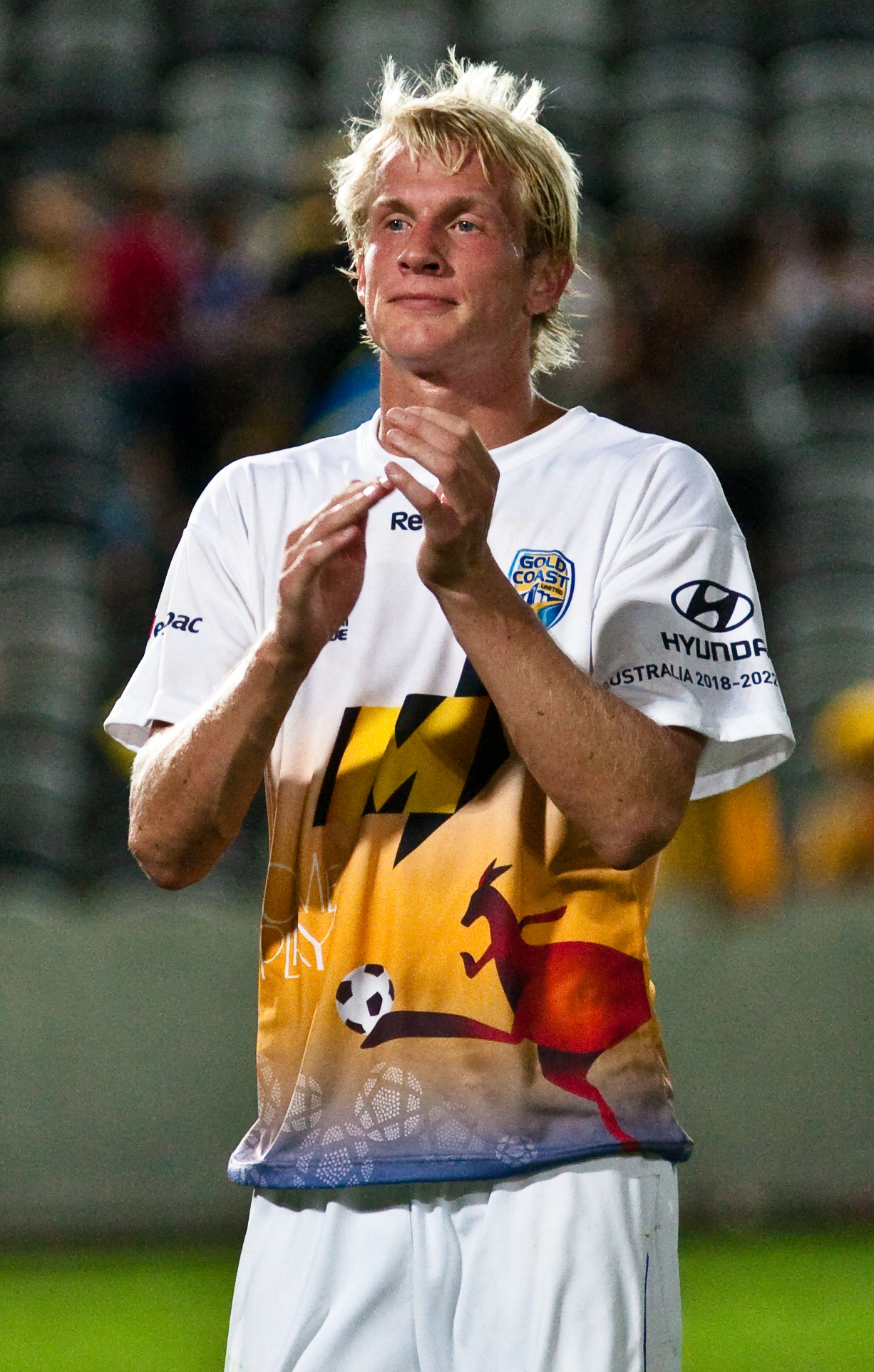

Personal information
- Full name: Sebastiaan van den Brink
- Date of birth: 11 September 1982 (age 44)
- Place of birth: Amsterdam, Netherlands
- Height: 1.89 m (6 ft 2 in)
- Position: Centre back

Youth career
- HSV De Zuidvogels
- 1996–2002: FC Utrecht

Senior career*
Years	Team	Apps	(Gls)
2002–2005	FC Utrecht	14	(1)
2004–2005	→ FC Emmen (loan)	13	(0)
2005–2007	FC Emmen	51	(0)
2007–2009	Omniworld	39	(0)
2009–2011	Gold Coast United	51	(4)
2011	Busan I'Park	6	(0)
2011–2013	Perth Glory	42	(1)
2013	Churchill Brothers SC	0	(0)
2013–2014	IJsselmeervogels	11	(0)
- * Club domestic league appearances and goals

Sebastiaan van den Brink (born 11 September 1982) is a Dutch retired footballer who played primarily as a centre back.

== Early life ==
Sebastiaan van den Brink was born on 11 September 1982 in Amsterdam.

== Club career ==
=== Early career ===
Van den Brink played for Dutch clubs FC Utrecht, FC Emmen and Omniworld before moving to Australia. Van den Brink made his debut in professional football at FC Utrecht. With Utrecht, he won the Dutch version of the Charity shield in 2004. This was a spectacular game as FC Utrecht managed to turn the match around in the last 5 minutes of the game to beat Ajax Amsterdam 4–2.

=== Gold Coast United ===
On 14 January 2009, he was the 21st player signed to Gold Coast United's inaugural squad. He was signed by Miron Bleiberg after watching him in an Eerste Divisie game for FC Omniworld against RBC Roosendaal. Between 2009 and 2011, he appeared in 50 league matches with Gold Coast, scoring 4 goals.

=== Busan I'Park ===
On 20 January 2011, it was announced that he would be joining South Korean K-League side Busan I'Park. However, his performance slumped and the club announced its decision to terminate his contract on 21 April.

=== Perth Glory ===
A-League club Perth Glory have announced they were interested in signing van den Brink for the up-coming season and on 7 June 2011, it was announced on that he had agreed terms. On 28 January 2013, it was announced that Perth Glory has released him from the final three months of his contract, at his request, so he could pursue other playing opportunities. Regarding this Glory coach Ian Ferguson was quoted as saying, "It was not an easy decision, but it's something we spoke about as a club and decided Bas can move on". Van den Brink said of his departure, "I am going to miss Perth, but I feel I had to go, and I’m really looking forward to a new challenge in my career."

In August 2013, it was revealed that van den Brink had retired from the game after a proposed move to I-League side Churchill Brothers fell through.

=== IJsselmeervogels ===
In 2013, Brink signed with Tweede Divisie side IJsselmeervogels and appeared in 11 league matches.

== A-League career statistics ==
(Correct as of 19 February 2012)

Club	Season	League			Finals			Asia			Total		
Club	Season	Apps	Goals	Assists	Apps	Goals	Assists	Apps	Goals	Assists	Apps	Goals	Assists
Gold Coast United	2009–10	26	1	0	1	0	0	-	-	-	27	1	0
Gold Coast United	2010–11	22	3	0	2	0	0	-	-	-	24	3	0
Perth Glory	2011–12	24	0	0	4	1	0	-	-	-	28	1	0
Perth Glory	2012–13	14	0	0	-	-	-	-	-	-	14	0	0
Total		86	4	0	7	1	0	-	-	-	93	5	0

== Honours ==
Utrecht

- Johan Cruyff Shield: 2004

Perth Glory

- A-League runner-up: 2011–12
