= Gold Coast United FC =

Australian soccer club in Queensland

- Founded: 28 August 2008; 18 years ago (A-League); 3 August 2017; 9 years ago (NPL)
- Ground: Coplick Family Sports Park (North)
- Capacity: 3,000
- Owner: Sports Gold Coast
- Chairman: Andrew Parkes
- Manager: Craig Midgley
- League: NPL Queensland
- 2026: 11th of 12
- Website: goldcoastunitedfc.com.au
Home colours	colours

Gold Coast United Football Club is an Australian soccer club based in Gold Coast, Queensland. The earliest incarnation of the club formed in 1966 and its home ground was at Broadbeach Park. The first era of Gold Coast United senior teams competed in the Brisbane leagues until the club disbanded after the 1979 season, allowing Broadbeach United Soccer Club to form its first senior team in 1980 at the same grounds.

Twenty-eight years later the club was revived and was officially announced as a professional expansion team for the A-League's 2009–2010 season on 28 August 2008. It was the second bid accepted by the league, with an unrelated bid known as Gold Coast Galaxy FC preceding it. The club was owned by Clive Palmer, the wealthiest man in Queensland, until the FFA took over the club's A-League licence in February 2012.

In their first two A-League seasons Gold Coast had strong on-field performance with a pair of top four finishes and playing in the finals, albeit without qualifying for a Grand Final. Their 3rd and final season saw the club's performance collapse as they finished last, and their attendance dropped from their 5,500 average to just under 3,300 people per game, making them the lowest attended team. On 29 February 2012, the FFA revoked Palmer's Gold Coast United A-League licence. The governing body had been in conflict with Palmer over a variety of license breaches, controversial statements, sacking the coach, giving a 17 year old a professional debut and appointment as the match day captain, and his decision to implement a "crowd cap" that closed most of the stadium. The club finished out the season and were shut down shortly after with their place in the competition taken by the hastily formed Western Sydney Wanderers FC.

On 3 August 2017, it was announced that they would be joining the National Premier League Queensland to compete in both Men's and Women's competitions.

== History ==
Gold Coast United's logo throughout their A-League tenure

=== Origins ===
In 1966 the club was formed with the first team consisting of players from varying nationalities and backgrounds, all seeking to take the first Gold Coast based soccer team north with a view to be a representative side playing in the Brisbane competitions of the day which were considered at the time to be stronger than the Gold Coast competitions. The club's first uniform was black and white with a split colour scheme down the centre of the shirt. In 1968 the club adopted the current blue and gold colours for the first time. The original team found immediate success in the Brisbane lower divisions and won their first two seasons comfortably. Over several years the club quickly ascended through multiple promotions into the upper divisions of Brisbane's soccer leagues, peaking in 1978 with a second-place finish in Brisbane's Division 2 competition. At the conclusion of the 1979 season, despite earning much fame and praise locally, the club disbanded with remaining players dissolving into a newly formed senior team for Broadbeach United Soccer Club.

In 2008 a consortium under the working title of "Gold Coast Galaxy FC", led by real estate magnate Fred Taplin was, along with North Queensland Thunder, considered for admission for the 2008–2009 season however Football Federation Australia delayed expansion of the league until at least the 2009–2010 season. The Galaxy was strongly expected to join in the 2008–2009 season along with North Queensland Thunder, expanding the league to ten teams. Although the Galaxy bid appeared to have good support, the Thunder bid appeared much less secure, particularly after a major financial backer pulled out of the franchise on 5 March 2008. The FFA determined on 11 March that neither team would be granted entry "in the best interests of the league," given that a nine team format was generally unfavoured. Clive Palmer, who originally owned the club fully, sold a 10 percent share of Gold Coast to close friends who live in Melbourne at the start of 2007 when the club were not fully expected to be given a licence into the A-League.

During the off-season prior to the 2008–2009 season, a number of players were touted to join the club and it made some tentative signings, including former Queensland Roar manager Miron Bleiberg, goalkeeper Scott Higgins, and former Wellington Phoenix Brazilian player Felipe. Without entry into 2008–2009 season, the players became free agents and could still sign for the 2009–2010 season depending on the terms of their next club contracts. The franchise was also linked at times with signing Nwankwo Kanu as their "marquee" player.

The name 'Galaxy' was an interim name and it was always undetermined whether or not that name would be used by the club as a permanent name. Galaxy was said to have ties to American Major League Soccer club Los Angeles Galaxy, which would have meant pre-season warm-up matches and possible player sharing opportunities. Indeed, in February 2008 there was even talk of David Beckham turning out for a pre-season match. The Galaxy consortium had planned to market the club deep into Northern New South Wales, down to Coffs Harbour.

=== Formation ===
The club's formation in 1966 was a significant forward step for Gold Coast soccer with Gold Coast United being the first team to take on the Brisbane competition leagues and showcase the talent emerging from the rapidly growing coastal city. The first teams consisted of players from varying nationalities and cultures combining with local players and were regarded as a formidable side by local media. The club continued to grow throughout a 13-year period and became a regular feature in the sports media pages of Brisbane and Gold Coast newspapers before disbanding in 1979.

In the late 2000s, soccer community and business leaders explored the idea of reforming the club in a pitch to enter a Gold Coast soccer team into the national A-League competition. Gold Coast United was reformed and a campaign to enter the A-League in 2008 fell short when the FFA decided not to have new franchises in 2008–2009 leaving the club to focus towards the 2009–2010 season. At the time, the club was 70 percent owned by Clive Palmer, the richest man in Queensland, and the other 30 percent was owned by 3 unidentified men. The local rival Galaxy consortium's chances of entering the A-League were dealt a severe blow in June 2008 when the United consortium headed by real estate and mining businessman Clive Palmer entered talks with the FFA. On 3 June 2008, Fred Taplin announced that the Gold Coast Galaxy had dropped out of the race for the Gold Coast licence and a place in the A-League 'in the interests of football'. The same day, FFA chief Ben Buckley confirmed that Gold Coast United and the Palmer consortium had succeeded in securing the franchise. On 6 June, Palmer signed a provisional agreement with the FFA to field a team in the 2009–2010 season. The press conference was held at Robina Stadium, further reinforcing the suggestion that the new franchise will play at the 27,000 capacity stadium. Palmer declared that he would build a side capable of winning the League in its first season.

=== 2010–11 season ===
On 9 April 2010 it was reported that Clive Palmer had ended his financial support of Gold Coast United, putting the club at risk of instant closure. However, this did not happen, and Palmer retained control of the club. Gold Coast United chief executive Clive Mensink denied the club would fold, but the club would be forced to change its ownership structure. The team recruited Bruce Djite, Peter Perchtold and the re-signing of Shane Smeltz.

=== 2011–12 season ===
The 2011–12 season began with several key players departing including Bruce Djite to Adelaide United and the loss of Shane Smeltz to Perth Glory.

On 27 January 2012, Clive Palmer once again caused controversy by deciding to close all but the western grandstand of Skilled Park for the remainder of the A-League season. The action was a form of punishment to the club's fans for a flare which was thrown during their derby against Brisbane Roar. Despite backlash from within the community, Palmer stuck with his word by permanently closing the northern and eastern stands along with the southern stand which was already closed. On 29 February 2012, the FFA revoked Clive Palmer's Gold Coast United's A-League licence, however, they were allowed to play the final four games of the season. As a result, Palmer founded Football Australia – a competing organisation without international affiliates.

=== 2017: Revival and National Premier League ===
On 3 August 2017, it was announced that the club had been admitted into the National Premier Leagues Queensland competition for the 2018 season, where it has remained since. The club has developed a wide array of football teams and programs across various Football Queensland men's, women's and junior academy tiers, and is currently a Football Queensland gold rated football development club.

During the 2024 season coach Grae Piddick led the men's team to their first grand final appearance in the club's National Premier League era, finishing second to Lions FC with a final score of 3-2 in the Kappa Pro Series Cup.

== Season by season record ==
Season	A-League										Australia Cup	ACL	Top scorer	
Season	P	W	D	L	F	A	GD	Pts	Pos	Finals	Australia Cup	ACL	Name	Goals
2009–10	27	13	5	9	39	35	+4	44	3rd	5th	—	—	(New Zealand) Shane Smeltz	19
2010–11	30	12	10	8	40	32	+8	46	4th	3rd	—	—	(Australia) Bruce Djite	10
2011–12	27	4	9	14	30	42	–12	21	10th	—	—	—	(Australia) James Brown	6
Season	NPL										Australia Cup	ACL	Top scorer	
Season	P	W	D	L	F	A	GD	Pts	Pos	Finals	Australia Cup	ACL	Name	Goals
2018	26	8	3	15	38	67	–29	27	10th	—	Round 5	—	(Australia) Brandon Reeves	11
2019	28	11	4	13	46	49	–6	37	7th	—	Round 4	—	(Australia) Brandon Reeves	15
2020	24	5	8	11	37	47	–10	23	11th	—	Cancelled	—	(New Zealand) Shane Smeltz	13
2021	24	11	4	11	47	39	+8	37	8th	—	Round 5	—	(Australia) Jarrod Kyle & (Australia) Sam Smith	9
2022	22	9	5	8	37	34	+3	32	6th	—	Round 6	—	(New Zealand) Shane Smeltz	11
2023	22	10	6	6	27	23	+4	36	3rd	EF	Round 7	—	(Australia) Curtis Stollery	9
2024	22	5	9	8	29	33	-4	24	7th	—	Round 7	—	(Australia) Chris Lucas	10
2025	22	8	3	11	25	44	-19	27	9th	—	Round 6	—	(Australia) Nicholas Panetta & (Australia) Luke Beckwith	5
2026	22	6	2	14	26	39	-13	20	11th	—	Round 6	—	(Australia) Chris Lucas	8

Champions	Runners-up	Third Place

- PO – Playoff
- GS – Group stage
- EF – Elimination finals
- R32 – Round of 32
- R16 – Round of 16
- QF – Quarter-finals
- SF – Semi-finals
- RU – Runners-up
- W – Winners
- DNQ – Did not qualify
- DQ – Disqualified
- **Bold** denotes player who currently plays for club.

Managers
Year/s	Manager/s	Notes
1966–67	(Denmark) Ebbe Sørensen	First captain and manager
2007–12	(Israel) Miron Bleiberg	3rd 2009–10
2012	(England) Mike Mulvey	Last season in A-League
2018	(England) Sean Lane	First season in the National Premier League
2019–21	(Australia) Kristian Rees	Former player
2021–24	(Australia) Grae Piddick	
2025–	(England) Craig Midgley	

== Colours and badge ==
The first Gold Coast United team in 1966 played in a black and white uniform, with the left side of the shirt's chest black and the right side white, split down the centre. The uniform also had white shorts and white socks with four thin black lines. The back of the shirt was mirrored to appear the same as the front. The following year the team changed to a blue and gold uniform which it retained until the first incarnation of the club folded in 1979. The original badge for the club was created in 1967 with a simple shield featuring a two-colour split fill of blue on the left and gold on the right. In the centre was a black and white soccer ball and the entire badge was bordered in red and inset with red text reading 'Gold Coast United Soccer Club.'

In 2009 the newly reformed team and club adopted the same colours, which closely resembled the original blue and gold of the 1960s era – being yellow and royal blue. These colours are synonymous with, and representative of, Gold Coast. The club's alternate jersey is all white. The second-era Gold Coast United club badge featured the colours of blue, yellow and white on a skewed shield shape with an artistic image representing the city skyline of Surfers Paradise on the left alongside the ocean and surf on the right.

For the 2011/2012 season, the Hyatt Regency Coolum Resort became United's title sponsor replacing Queensland Nickel, a company owned by Clive Palmer. The Hyatt emblem was emblazoned on the front of the club's strip. Other sponsors to have appeared on United's strip include Modern Solar, WAECO and Westpac.

The current uniform and badge for the third era of the club retains similar colours with the badge appearing as a more refined shield shape and depiction of the modern Surfers Paradise skyline along with a distinct curling wave in a lighter tone of blue. The current playing uniform features a prominent golden yellow shirt and dark navy blue short, with matching navy blue socks.

== Ground ==
The original grounds for the club were at Nikiforides Family Park in Broadbeach, the current home of Broadbeach United Soccer Club. The club remained at this location until disbanding in 1979.

When the club was revived in 2008 the home ground was Skilled Park. It shared this ground with the Gold Coast Titans NRL team. It is located in the growth suburb of Robina, next to Robina railway station. Skilled Park is able to seat 27,400 people. Low crowds in 2009 had led to the club capping crowds at 5000. The lowest crowd attendance was 1,141 when they played the Central Coast Mariners FC at Skilled Park, on 22 February 2012 in a 3–3 draw.

In December 2018, the club was granted council access to use the newly constructed fields and facilities at Coplicks Family Sports Park in Tallebudgera Valley as their permanent training and administration base.

== Rivalries ==
Due to its proximity to Brisbane, Gold Coast United shared a local rivalry against the Brisbane Roar. There was also a local rivalry with North Queensland FC, given both clubs' status as Queensland clubs.

A media-generated rivalry commenced before the two teams' first meeting of Gold Coast and Perth Glory. The rivalry was represented by a solid gold trophy donated by club owner and mining magnate Clive Palmer, and the trophy was to be contested each time the two teams met. It was considered a minor rivalry match by Perth Glory and Gold Coast supporters. The final head-to-head record for Gold Coast was four wins, two draws, and two losses.

As one of only two clubs located on the Gold Coast, Gold Coast United now shares a local derby rivalry with neighbouring club Gold Coast Knights FC, with season games held at both clubs drawing substantial local crowds.

== Supporters ==
Gold Coast United had a relationship with the Gold Coast United Supporters Club (GCUSC), the major supporter group following the club situated in Bay 30 at games during the club's A-League period.

== Managers ==
- (Israel) Miron Bleiberg (Aug 2007–12)
- (England) Mike Mulvey (interim) (Feb 2012 – Jun 2012)
- (England) Sean Lane (Oct 2017 – Sep 2018)
- (Australia) Kristian Rees (Oct 2018 – Sep 2019)
- (Australia) Shannon McLuckie (Oct 2019 – current)

== Club captains ==
Dates	Name	Notes	Honours (as captain)
2009–2011	(Australia) Jason Culina	Inaugural club captain	
2011–2012	(Australia) Michael Thwaite		

== Records ==
=== Top goalscorers ===
As of match played 25 March 2012

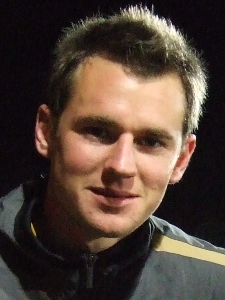
Shane Smeltz is Gold Coast United's top goalscorer, with 28 goals in 38 games.

	Name	Years	A-League	A-League finals	Total
1	(New Zealand) Shane Smeltz	2009–2011	26 (34)	2 (4)	28 (38)
2	(Australia) Bruce Djite	2009–2010	9 (20)	1 (3)	10 (23)
3	(Australia) James Brown	2009–2012	9 (37)	0 (1)	9 (38)
4	(Australia) Jason Culina	2009–2011	8 (43)	0 (1)	8 (44)
5	(Australia) Joel Porter	2009–2011	7 (39)	0 (4)	7 (43)
6	(Australia) Kristian Rees	2009–2012	4 (71)	0 (2)	4 (73)
6	(Netherlands) Bas van den Brink	2009–2011	4 (47)	0 (3)	4 (50)
6	(Australia) Dino Djulbic	2009–2011	3 (36)	1 (4)	4 (40)
6	(Australia) Ben Halloran	2010–2012	4 (26)	0 (0)	4 (26)
6	(Netherlands) Maceo Rigters	2011–2012	4 (22)	0 (0)	4 (22)

=== Most appearances ===
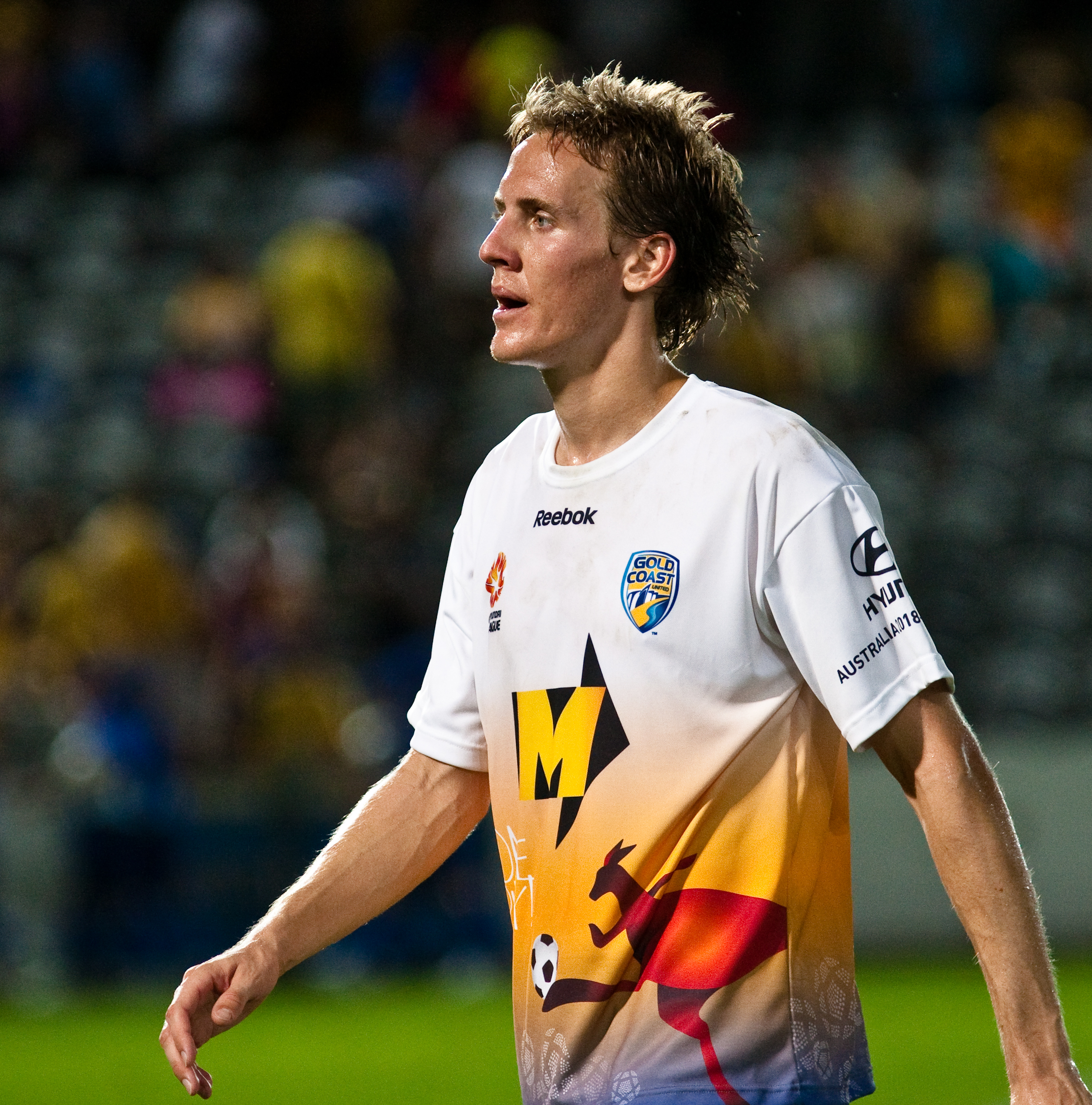
Michael Thwaite is Gold Coast United's most capped player, amassing 82 appearances over the club's three years.

As of Match played 25 March 2012

	Name	Years	A-League	A-League finals	Total
1	(Australia) Michael Thwaite	2009–2012	78 (1)	4 (0)	82 (1)
2	(Australia) Kristian Rees	2009–2012	71 (4)	2 (0)	73 (4)
3	(Ivory Coast) Adama Traoré	2009–2012	67 (3)	2 (0)	69 (3)
4	(Australia) Zenon Caravella	2009–2011	48 (1)	4 (0)	52 (1)
5	(Netherlands) Bas van den Brink	2009–2011	47 (3)	3 (0)	50 (4)
6	(Australia) Steve Pantelidis	2009–2011	46 (1)	3 (0)	49 (1)
7	(Brazil) Anderson	2009–2011	44 (0)	4 (0)	48 (0)
8	(Australia) Jason Culina	2009–2011	43 (8)	1 (0)	44 (8)
9	(Australia) Joel Porter	2011–2016	39 (7)	4 (0)	43 (7)
10	(New Zealand) Glen Moss	2010–2012	38 (0)	3 (0)	41 (0)

=== All-time win–loss record ===
As of Match played 25 March 2012

Opponents	Played	Won	Drawn	Lost	GF	GA	GD	% won
Adelaide United	10	3	4	3	13	10	+3	30
Brisbane Roar	9	4	2	3	13	13	0	44.44
Central Coast Mariners	10	2	5	3	11	15	-3	20
Melbourne Heart	6	1	3	2	6	5	+1	16.67
Melbourne Victory	10	3	2	5	9	15	-6	30
Newcastle Jets	10	4	2	4	15	12	+4	40
North Queensland Fury	6	3	0	3	13	7	+6	50
Perth Glory	9	5	2	2	12	10	+2	55.56
Sydney FC	9	4	2	3	10	10	0	44.44
Wellington Phoenix	9	2	3	4	9	15	-6	22.22
Total	88	31	25	32	111	112	-1	35.23

=== Players who have represented their nation at senior level ===
Player	Pos	National team	Apps (Gls)	World Cups	Confederations Cup	Continental championships
Jacob Borg	DF	Malta	1 (0)	0	0	0
Joshua Brilliante	DF	Australia	5 (0)	0	0	0
Mitch Cooper	MF	Vanuatu	6 (5)	0	0	0
Jason Culina	MF	Australia	58 (1)	2 (2006, 2010)	1 (2005)	2 (AFC 2007, 2011)
Bruce Djite	FW	Australia	9 (0)	0	0	0
Dino Djulbic	DF	Australia	2 (0)	0	0	0
Adam Griffiths	MF	Australia	2 (0)	0	0	0
Ben Halloran	MF	Australia	6 (0)	1 (2014)	0	0
Dylan McGowan	DF	Australia	1 (0)	0	0	0
Charlie Miller	MF	Scotland	1 (0)	0	0	0
Glen Moss	GK	New Zealand	29 (0)	1 (2010)	2 (2009, 2017)	3 (OFC 2004, 2008, 2012)
Joel Porter	FW	Australia	4 (6)	0	0	1 (OFC 2002)
Shane Smeltz	FW	New Zealand	58 (24)	1 (2010)	3 (2003, 2009, 2017)	3 (OFC 2004, 2008, 2012)
Samuel Tesfagabr	DF	Eritrea	1 (0)	0	0	0
Michael Thwaite	DF	Australia	13 (0)	0	0	1 (AFC 2007)
Adama Traoré	DF	Ivory Coast	12 (0)	0	0	1 (CAF 2017)
Ambesager Yosief	DF	Eritrea	1 (0)	0	0	0

=== Managerial ===
As of Match played 25 March 2012

Name	Nationality	From	To	P	W	D	L	GF	GA	Win%
Miron Bleiberg	Israel	8 August 2009	19 February 2012	81	30	21	30	102	103	37.04
Mike Mulvey	England	20 February 2012	25 March 2012	7	1	3	3	9	5	14.29

== See also ==
- Expansion of the A-League
- A-League Men
- National Premier Leagues Queensland
- 2009–10 Gold Coast United FC season
- 2010–11 Gold Coast United FC season
- 2011–12 Gold Coast United FC season
