= 2013–14 Central Coast Mariners FC season =

Central Coast Mariners
2013–14 season
- Chairman: Michael Charlesworth
- Manager: Graham Arnold (to 14 November 2013); Phil Moss
- Stadium: Central Coast Stadium, Gosford
- A-League: 3rd
- A-League Finals Series: Semi-final
- AFC Champions League: Group stage
- Top goalscorer: League: Bernie Ibini (5); All: Bernie Ibini (6)
- Highest home attendance: 17,134 vs Western Sydney Wanderers; 12 October 2013
- Lowest home attendance: 5,787 vs Melbourne Victory; 30 November 2013
- Average home league attendance: 9,398
Home colours	Away colours	Third colours

The 2013–14 Central Coast Mariners FC season was the club's ninth season since its establishment in 2004, and included the 2013–14 A-League season as well as the 2014 AFC Champions League.

After their second placing in the A-League Premiership behind debutantes Western Sydney Wanderers followed by their maiden Championship (also against the Wanderers), the Mariners finished their previous season in the Round of 16 of the AFC Champions League – their best ever result in the continental competition, including their first win away in Asia against K-League side Suwon Bluewings.

Despite the retirement of central defender Patrick Zwaanswijk and the departure of goalkeeper Mathew Ryan, attacking midfielder Oliver Bozanic, striker Bernie Ibini-Isei and right back Pedj Bojić during the pre-season – and continued departures during the season, including Head Coach Graham Arnold and Head of Sports Science Andrew Clark – the Mariners came close to repeating that success, finishing third in the 2013–14 A-League and reaching the semi-final against Western Sydney Wanderers along with narrowly missing out on reaching the Round of 16 of the Champions League.

== Season overview ==
=== May 2013 ===
Following an injury-plagued stint at K-League side Chunnam Dragons which subsequently saw that club grant him a release early in 2013, Matt Simon re-signed with the Mariners on a one-year contract on 16 May.

Citing increasing physical and mental stress associated with the constant commute between his home and personal training business in Sydney and the Mariners' home base on the Central Coast, Pedj Bojić sought and was subsequently granted a release from the final year of his contract with effect from 24 May. Bojić subsequently signed with Sydney FC on 19 June.

Having been linked with a number of European clubs during the January transfer window, goalkeeper Mathew Ryan signed a 3-year deal with Belgian Pro League club Club Brugge on 30 May, in the process turning down an offer from Danish Superliga side Randers.

=== June 2013 ===
After trialling with Club Brugge during the January transfer window and with French Ligue 1 side Lille after the Grand Final, Bernie Ibini-Isei signed a 3-year deal with Chinese Super League newcomers Shanghai SIPG on 4 June.

Midfielder Adriano Pellegrino and left back Brad McDonald moved to National Premier Leagues NSW side Central Coast Mariners Academy on 5 June after the conclusion of their contracts.

The club announced on 8 June that striker Daniel McBreen would join Shanghai SIPG on loan until the end of October; he would be available to play for the Mariners again in the Round 4 F3 Derby on 2 November.

On 19 June the club confirmed that Oliver Bozanic would be transferring to Swiss Super League club FC Luzern on a two-year contract.

=== July 2013 ===
On 5 July the club announced the signing of Argentinian and former Melbourne Victory marquee Marcos Flores on a one-year deal following his release from the Victory.

On 8 July the club announced the signing of former Perth Glory defender Storm Roux to a two-year contract, along with a three-year contract for Tom Slater, midfielder from Sydney FC's National Youth League side and son of former Socceroo Robbie Slater.

On 9 July the club announced the signing of Dutch defender Marcel Seip from Eerste Divisie side VVV-Venlo on a three-year contract.

=== August 2013 ===
On 23 August the club announced the signing of former Sydney FC, Wellington Phoenix, Brisbane Roar and Newcastle Jets goalkeeper Liam Reddy on a one-year "zero-tolerance" contract. This signing was viewed as highly controversial given his previous drunken behaviour at Sydney FC (which resulted in his contract being terminated in April 2012) and violent conduct against Mariners players Matt Simon and Wayne O'Sullivan.

On 30 August it was announced that Graham Arnold had signed a contract to remain as Head Coach for the Mariners until the end of the 2015–16 season.

=== November 2013 ===
On 14 November the club announced that Graham Arnold had signed a two-year deal to become the manager of J.League Division 1 side Vegalta Sendai; former assistant manager Phil Moss was promoted to Head Coach with immediate effect. Foundation player and former Wellington Phoenix assistant coach Wayne O'Sullivan was announced as Moss' replacement as assistant coach on 21 November.

On 22 November the club announced that Zachary Anderson and Trent Sainsbury had extended their contracts; Anderson will remain until the end of the 2014–15 season while Sainsbury will continue until the end of the 2015–16 season.

=== December 2013 ===
On 1 December the club confirmed that Andrew Clark, Head of Sports Science and foundation player, would be joining Graham Arnold at Vegalta Sendai following the Mariners' Round 10 game against Adelaide United in Adelaide.

On 23 December the club confirmed that Michael McGlinchey would move to Vegalta Sendai on loan following the Round 13 game against Melbourne Heart until the end of the 2014 J.League Division 1 season; in addition Bernie Ibini-Isei will return on loan from Shanghai SIPG from the Round 14 game against Wellington Phoenix until 31 May 2014.

=== January 2014 ===
During a training session on 2 January, Marcos Flores sustained an injury to his right knee, which was subsequently confirmed to be a ruptured anterior cruciate ligament; the club announced on 3 January that Flores had been ruled out for the remainder of the season.

On 31 January the club announced two departures:

- Trent Sainsbury would be transferring to Eredivisie club PEC Zwolle on a 2 1/2-year contract, effective immediately;
- Daniel McBreen would be returning to Shanghai SIPG on a one-year contract, effective immediately.

=== February 2014 ===
On 1 February the club announced that former Guangzhou R&F defender Eddy Bosnar would be joining the club until the end of May.

On 2 February the club announced that former Ulsan Hyundai winger Kim Seung-Yong had signed with the club for the remainder of the season.

The club announced the following signings on 5 February:

- Glen Trifiro was signed on loan from Sydney United until the end of May;
- Matt Sim was signed on loan from Sutherland Sharks until the end of May;
- Isaka Cernak was signed on a contract until the end of the 2014–15 season after being released by Perth Glory.

=== March 2014 ===
The club announced on 15 March that goalkeeper Liam Reddy had been granted a two-year contract extension, keeping him at the Mariners until the conclusion of the 2015–16 season.

On 29 March the club announced that it would not be renewing Marcos Flores' contract when it expired at the end of May.

=== April 2014 ===
On 11 April the club announced that it had signed Glen Trifiro – who had been on loan from Sydney United until the end of May – to a one-year contract.

On 18 April the club announced that it had signed Matt Sim – who had been on loan from Sutherland Sharks until the end of May – to a one-year contract.

== Players ==
=== Squad information ===
Players who have been announced as contracted to the Central Coast Mariners senior squad for the 2013–14 season. Note: Flags indicate national team as defined under FIFA eligibility rules; some limited exceptions apply. Players may hold more than one non-FIFA nationality.

No.	Pos.	Nation	Player
1	GK	AUS	Justin Pasfield
3	DF	AUS	Joshua Rose
4	DF	NED	Marcel Seip
5	DF	AUS	Zachary Anderson
6	DF	AUS	Brent Griffiths
7	MF	MLT	John Hutchinson (Captain)
8	MF	SCO	Nick Montgomery
9	FW	AUS	Mitchell Duke
10	FW	ARG	Marcos Flores
11	FW	AUS	Nick Fitzgerald
12	GK	AUS	Liam Reddy
13	DF	AUS	Hayden Morton (Youth)
15	DF	NZL	Storm Roux (Youth)
17	MF	AUS	Anthony Cáceres

No.	Pos.	Nation	Player
18	DF	AUS	Michael Neill (Youth)
19	FW	AUS	Matt Simon
20	FW	AUS	Bernie Ibini-Isei
21	FW	AUS	Mile Sterjovski
22	MF	AUS	Tom Slater (Youth)
23	FW	AUS	Adam Kwasnik
24	MF	AUS	Jesse Curran (Youth)
25	DF	AUS	Eddy Bosnar
26	MF	KOR	Kim Seung-Yong
27	MF	AUS	Isaka Cernak
28	MF	AUS	Glen Trifiro
29	DF	AUS	Matt Sim
33	FW	AUS	Joshua Bingham (Youth)
72	GK	AUS	John Crawley

=== Squad statistics ===
No.	Pos	Nat	Player	Total		A League		Finals		AFC Champions League	
No.	Pos	Nat	Player	Apps	Goals	Apps	Goals	Apps	Goals	Apps	Goals
1	GK	(Australia) AUS	Justin Pasfield	4	0	4+0	0	0+0	0	0+0	0
3	DF	(Australia) AUS	Joshua Rose	31	1	23+0	1	2+0	0	5+1	0
4	DF	(Netherlands) NED	Marcel Seip	16	1	11+3	0	0+0	0	2+0	1
5	DF	(Australia) AUS	Zachary Anderson	28	1	20+0	1	2+0	0	6+0	0
6	DF	(Australia) AUS	Brent Griffiths	10	0	3+3	0	0+0	0	2+2	0
7	MF	(Malta) MLT	John Hutchinson	33	0	22+3	0	1+1	0	6+0	0
8	MF	(Scotland) SCO	Nick Montgomery	31	0	21+3	0	2+0	0	5+0	0
9	FW	(Australia) AUS	Mitchell Duke	35	3	17+10	3	2+0	0	1+5	0
10	MF	(Argentina) ARG	Marcos Flores	12	3	11+1	3	0+0	0	0+0	0
11	MF	(Australia) AUS	Nick Fitzgerald	27	4	19+2	3	2+0	0	3+1	1
12	GK	(Australia) AUS	Liam Reddy	31	0	23+0	0	2+0	0	6+0	0
13	DF	(Australia) AUS	Hayden Morton	0	0	0+0	0	0+0	0	0+0	0
15	DF	(New Zealand) NZL	Storm Roux	31	1	22+1	1	2+0	0	5+1	0
17	MF	(Australia) AUS	Anthony Caceres	23	2	12+6	2	2+0	0	2+1	0
18	DF	(Australia) AUS	Michael Neill	0	0	0+0	0	0+0	0	0+0	0
19	FW	(Australia) AUS	Matt Simon	30	2	11+13	2	0+2	0	4+0	0
20	FW	(Australia) AUS	Bernie Ibini-Isei	21	6	6+8	5	2+0	1	3+2	0
21	MF	(Australia) AUS	Mile Sterjovski	32	5	17+10	3	0+2	0	3+0	2
22	MF	(Australia) AUS	Tom Slater	1	0	0+1	0	0+0	0	0+0	0
23	FW	(Australia) AUS	Adam Kwasnik	0	0	0+0	0	0+0	0	0+0	0
24	MF	(Australia) AUS	Jesse Curran	0	0	0+0	0	0+0	0	0+0	0
25	DF	(Australia) AUS	Eddy Bosnar	14	1	9+0	1	2+0	0	3+0	0
26	MF	(South Korea) KOR	Kim Seung-Yong	14	2	7+1	2	0+1	0	5+0	0
27	MF	(Australia) AUS	Isaka Cernak	4	0	0+1	0	0+0	0	2+1	0
28	MF	(Australia) AUS	Glen Trifiro	9	1	1+3	1	1+0	0	2+2	0
29	DF	(Australia) AUS	Matt Sim	6	0	2+2	0	0+0	0	1+1	0
33	FW	(Australia) AUS	Josh Bingham	0	0	0+0	0	0+0	0	0+0	0
72	GK	(Australia) AUS	John Crawley	0	0	0+0	0	0+0	0	0+0	0
Players no longer at the club:
2	FW	(Australia) AUS	Daniel McBreen	12	2	10+2	2	0+0	0	0+0	0
14	MF	(New Zealand) NZL	Michael McGlinchey	9	2	8+1	2	0+0	0	0+0	0
16	DF	(Australia) AUS	Trent Sainsbury	16	1	16+0	1	0+0	0	0+0	0

== Transfers ==
=== Winter ===
==== In ====
Name	Position	Moving from	Notes
(Australia) Matt Simon	Forward	(South Korea) Chunnam Dragons	One year contract
(Argentina) Marcos Flores	Midfielder	(Australia) Melbourne Victory	One year contract
(New Zealand) Storm Roux	Defender	(Australia) Perth Glory	Two year contract
(Australia) Tom Slater	Forward	(Australia) Sydney FC Youth	Three year contract
(Netherlands) Marcel Seip	Defender	(Netherlands) VVV-Venlo	Three year contract
(Australia) Liam Reddy	Goalkeeper	(Australia) Sydney FC	One year "zero-tolerance" contract
(Australia) Hayden Morton	Defender	(Australia) Central Coast Mariners Youth	Promoted
(Australia) Michael Neill	Defender	(Australia) Central Coast Mariners Youth	Promoted

==== Out ====
Name	Position	Moving to	Notes
(Australia) Pedj Bojić	Defender	(Australia) Sydney FC	Released on 24 May
(Australia) Mathew Ryan	Goalkeeper	(Belgium) Club Brugge	Three year contract
(Australia) Bernie Ibini-Isei	Forward	(China) Shanghai SIPG	Three year contract
(Australia) Oliver Bozanic	Midfielder	(Switzerland) FC Luzern	Two year contract
(Australia) Adriano Pellegrino	Midfielder	(Australia) Central Coast; Mariners Academy	
(Papua New Guinea) Brad McDonald	Defender	(Australia) Central Coast; Mariners Academy	
(Netherlands) Patrick Zwaanswijk	Defender	Retired	Staying with club as Head of Youth & Community Football
(Australia) Daniel McBreen	Forward	(China) Shanghai SIPG	Loan (June 2013 – October 2013)

=== Summer ===
==== In ====
Name	Position	Moving from	Notes
(Australia) Bernie Ibini-Isei	Forward	(China) Shanghai SIPG	Loan (January 2014 – May 2014)
(Australia) Eddy Bosnar	Defender	( (China) Guangzhou R&F)	Signed until end of May
(South Korea) Kim Seung-Yong	Winger	( (South Korea) Ulsan Hyundai)	Signed until end of season
(Australia) Glen Trifiro	Midfielder	(Australia) Sydney United	Loan until end of May
(Australia) Matt Sim	Defender	(Australia) Sutherland Sharks	Loan until end of May
(Australia) Isaka Cernak	Midfielder	(Australia) Perth Glory	One-and-a-half year contract

==== Out ====
Name	Position	Moving to	Notes
(New Zealand) Michael McGlinchey	Midfielder	(Japan) Vegalta Sendai	Loan (January 2014 – December 2014)
(Australia) Trent Sainsbury	Defender	(Netherlands) PEC Zwolle	Two-and-a-half year contract
(Australia) Daniel McBreen	Forward	(China) Shanghai SIPG	One year contract

== Pre-season and friendlies ==
27 August 2013	Central Coast Mariners Academy (Australia)	2–1	Central Coast Mariners	Pluim Park, Lisarow
Tuesday 19:00 AEST	Payne 26'; Woodbine 52'	Report	Fitzgerald 72'

29 August 2013	Gladesville Spirit (Australia)	0–1	Central Coast Mariners	Christie Park, Macquarie Park
Thursday 19:00 AEST		Report	Slater 74'

4 September 2013 Doug Turnbull; Cup	Bankstown City Lions (Australia)	0–1	Central Coast Mariners	Jensen Oval, Sefton
Wednesday 19:00 AEST			Sterjovski 33'

7 September 2013	Central Coast Mariners	1–2	Brisbane Roar	Carrington Park, Bathurst
Saturday 16:00 AEST	Simon 64'	Report	Miller 12'; Brown 60'

12 September 2013	Adelaide United	0–1	Central Coast Mariners	Coopers Stadium, Adelaide
Thursday 16:00 ACST		Report	Elsey 58' (o.g.)

20 September 2013 Menpora Cup; Group A	Central Coast Mariners (Australia)	2–0	(Indonesia) Sriwijaya F.C.	Stadion Si Jalak Harupat, Bandung
Friday 15:30 WIB	Simon 36'; Fitzgerald 80'	Report		Attendance: 4,968; Referee: Ahamd Suparman

22 September 2013 Menpora Cup; Group A	Malaysia U-23	0–2	(Australia) Central Coast Mariners	Stadion Si Jalak Harupat, Bandung
Sunday 15:30 WIB		Report	Simon 42'; Duke 90'	Attendance: 3,068; Referee: Jerry Elly

24 September 2013 Menpora Cup; Group A	Central Coast Mariners (Australia)	3–3	(Indonesia) Persib Bandung	Stadion Si Jalak Harupat, Bandung
Tuesday 18:30 WIB	Fitzgerald 3'; Flores 19', 38' (yellow card) 63' (red card) 82'	Report	Adachihara 8'; M. Messi 14'; Moreira 90+2'	Attendance: 10,980; Referee: M. Adung

29 September 2013	Newcastle Jets	2–1	Central Coast Mariners	Scully Park Oval, Tamworth
Sunday 14:00 AEST	Goodwin 19', 23'	Report	Griffiths 65'

29 September 2013 Menpora Cup; Final	Central Coast Mariners (Australia)	1–2	Arema Indonesia	Kanjuruhan Stadium, Malang
Sunday 18:00 WIB	Flores 45'	Report	Gumbs 43' (pen.), 56' (pen.)	Attendance: 38,438; Referee: Oki Dwi Putra Senjaya (Indonesia)

== Competitions ==
=== Overall ===
Competition	Started round	Current position / round	Final position / round	First match	Last match
A-League	—	—	3rd	12 October 2013	12 April 2014
A-League Final Series	Elimination finals	Semi-finals	—	19 April 2014	26 April 2014
AFC Champions League	Group stage	—	Group stage	25 February 2014	23 April 2014
National Youth League	—	—	10th	27 October 2013	2 March 2014

=== A-League ===
==== League table ====
Pos	Team	Pld	W	D	L	GF	GA	GD	Pts	Qualification
1	Brisbane Roar (C)	27	16	4	7	43	25	+18	52	Qualificaition for 2015 AFC Champions League group stage and finals series
2	Western Sydney Wanderers	27	11	9	7	34	29	+5	42	Qualificaition for 2015 AFC Champions League group stage and finals series
3	Central Coast Mariners	27	12	6	9	33	36	−3	42	Qualification for 2015 AFC Champions League qualifying play-off and finals series (Note: Since the winner of 2014 A-League Grand Final (Brisbane Roar) qualified for the 2015 AFC Champions League group stage, the 2nd and 3rd placed teams qualified for the group stage and the qualifying play-off of 2015 AFC Champions League.)
4	Melbourne Victory	27	11	8	8	42	43	−1	41	Qualification for Finals series
5	Sydney FC	27	12	3	12	40	38	+2	39	Qualification for Finals series
6	Adelaide United	27	10	8	9	45	36	+9	38	Qualification for Finals series
7	Newcastle Jets	27	10	6	11	34	34	0	36	
8	Perth Glory	27	7	7	13	28	37	−9	28	
9	Wellington Phoenix (Note: Wellington Phoenix cannot qualify for the AFC Champions League as they are not recognised as an AFC club.)	27	7	7	13	36	51	−15	28	
10	Melbourne Heart	27	6	8	13	36	42	−6	26	

Updated to match(es) played on 13 April 2014. Source: ultimatealeague.com
Rules for classification: 1) points; 2) goal difference; 3) number of goals scored.
(C) Champions

==== Results summary ====
Overall								Home						Away					
Pld	W	D	L	GF	GA	GD	Pts	W	D	L	GF	GA	GD	W	D	L	GF	GA	GD
27	12	6	9	33	36	−3	42	8	3	3	18	13	+5	4	3	6	15	23	−8

Last updated: 13 April 2014.
Source: Competitive Matches

==== Results by round ====
Round	1	2	3	4	5	6	7	8	9	10	11	12	13	14	15	16	17	18	19	20	21	22	23	24	25	26	27
Ground	H	A	H	A	H	H	A	H	H	A	A	H	H	A	A	H	A	H	A	H	H	A	H	A	H	A	A
Result	D	D	W	D	L	W	W	D	W	L	L	W	D	D	W	W	L	L	L	L	W	L	W	W	W	L	W
Position	4	4	3	5	5	7\4 (Note: Round 6 was postponed (played between rounds 10 and 11) due to clash with New Zealand's FIFA World Cup qualifying match. The first position (7) is after the non-postponed matches of round 6. The second position (4) is after the postponed match.)	6	6	5	6	6	4	3	3	3	3	3	3	5	6	4	6	4	4	2	3	3

Updated to match(es) played on 13 April 2014. Source: Matches
A = Away; H = Home; W = Win; D = Draw; L = Loss

==== Matches ====
12 October 2013 1	Central Coast Mariners	1–1	Western Sydney Wanderers	Bluetongue Stadium, Gosford
Saturday 17:30 AEDT	Duke 55'	Report	Juric 87'	Attendance: 17,134; Referee: Kris Griffiths-Jones

19 October 2013 2	Melbourne Heart	2–2	Central Coast Mariners	AAMI Park, Melbourne
Saturday 17:30 AEDT	Williams 54', 60'	Report	Flores 70' (pen.), 76' (pen.)	Attendance: 8,734; Referee: Ben Williams

26 October 2013 3	Central Coast Mariners	1–0	Adelaide United	Bluetongue Stadium, Gosford
Saturday 17:30 AEDT	Fitzgerald 2'	Report		Attendance: 9,109; Referee: Peter Green

2 November 2013 4	Newcastle Jets	2–2	Central Coast Mariners	Hunter Stadium, Newcastle
Saturday 19:30 AEDT	Neville 51'; Sainsbury 56' (o.g.)	Report	Flores 65' (pen.); Sterjovski 80'	Attendance: 13,744; Referee: Kris Griffiths-Jones

10 November 2013 5	Central Coast Mariners	0–1	Brisbane Roar	Bluetongue Stadium, Gosford
Sunday 17:00 AEDT		Report	Yeboah 89'	Attendance: 8,303; Referee: Ben Williams

19 December 2013 rescheduled 6	Central Coast Mariners	1–0	Wellington Phoenix	North Sydney Oval, Sydney
Thursday 19:30 AEDT	Roux 27'	Report		Attendance: 6,755; Referee: Kris Griffiths-Jones

23 November 2013 7	Perth Glory	1–2	Central Coast Mariners	nib Stadium, Perth
Saturday 18:45 AWST	Maclaren 25'	Report	McGlinchey 35'; Duke 90+4'	Attendance: 8,923; Referee: Adam Kersey

29 November 2013 8	Central Coast Mariners	0–0	Melbourne Victory	Bluetongue Stadium, Gosford
Friday 19:30 AEDT		Report		Attendance: 5,787; Referee: Kris Griffiths-Jones

7 December 2013 9	Central Coast Mariners	1–0	Sydney FC	Bluetongue Stadium, Gosford
Saturday 19:30 AEDT	McBreen 26'	Report		Attendance: 10,251; Referee: Peter Green

14 December 2013 10	Adelaide United	4–0	Central Coast Mariners	Coopers Stadium, Adelaide
Saturday 17:00 ACDT	Djite 25'; F. Ferreira 40'; Cirio 54'; Jerónimo 90'	Report		Attendance: 7,785; Referee: Ben Williams

23 December 2013 11	Western Sydney Wanderers	2–0	Central Coast Mariners	Pirtek Stadium, Parramatta
Monday 19:00 AEDT	Juric 19'; Hersi 32'	Report		Attendance: 15,786; Referee: Strebre Delovski

31 December 2013 12	Central Coast Mariners	2–1	Perth Glory	Bluetongue Stadium, Gosford
Tuesday 19:30 AEDT	Sainsbury 11'; McGlinchey 90+6'	Report	McGarry 83' (pen.); J. Burns (yellow card) 89' (red card) 90+4'	Attendance: 12,919; Referee: Shaun Evans

5 January 2014 13	Central Coast Mariners	0–0	Melbourne Heart	Bluetongue Stadium, Gosford
Sunday 17:00 AEDT		Report		Attendance: 8,062; Referee: Jarred Gillett

12 January 2014 14	Wellington Phoenix	1–1	Central Coast Mariners	Westpac Stadium, Wellington
Sunday 19:00 NZDT	Cunningham 45'	Report	Simon 16'	Attendance: 7,000; Referee: Matthew Gillett

18 January 2014 15	Sydney FC	0–1	Central Coast Mariners	Sydney Football Stadium, Sydney
Saturday 19:30 AEDT		Report	Sterjovski 58'	Attendance: 16,006; Referee: Peter O'Leary

25 January 2014 16	Central Coast Mariners	3–0	Newcastle Jets	Central Coast Stadium, Gosford
Saturday 19:30 AEDT	Cáceres 13'; McBreen 32'; Simon 45+2'	Report		Attendance: 10,920; Referee: Jarred Gillett

2 February 2014 17	Brisbane Roar	2–1	Central Coast Mariners	Suncorp Stadium, Brisbane
Sunday 16:00 AEST	Henrique 66'; Berisha 90'	Report	Sterjovski 36' (pen.)	Attendance: 16,078; Referee: Strebre Delovski

8 February 2014 18	Central Coast Mariners	1–3	Melbourne Victory	Central Coast Stadium, Gosford
Saturday 17:30 AEDT	Ibini 11'	Report	Troisi 45+1', 62'; A. Thompson 50'	Attendance: 9,138; Referee: Matthew Gillett

14 February 2014 19	Adelaide United	2–0	Central Coast Mariners	Coopers Stadium, Adelaide
Friday 19:00 ACDT	Carrusca 33'; F. Ferreira 45+1'	Report		Attendance: 6,980; Referee: Kris Griffiths-Jones

21 February 2014 20	Central Coast Mariners	1–4	Wellington Phoenix	Central Coast Stadium, Gosford
Friday 19:30 AEDT	Ibini 20'	Report	Cunningham 47'; Hernández 64'; Huysegems 65'; Brockie 82'	Attendance: 6,147; Referee: Alan Milliner

1 March 2014 21	Central Coast Mariners	2–1	Sydney FC	Central Coast Stadium, Gosford
Saturday 17:30 AEDT	Kim 26'; Duke 75'	Report	Garcia 62'	Attendance: 6,430; Referee: Jarred Gillett

7 March 2014 22	Melbourne Victory	3–1	Central Coast Mariners	AAMI Park, Melbourne
Friday 19:30 AEDT	J. Jeggo 31'; Troisi 77' (pen.); Barbarouses 90+2'	Report	Anderson 63'	Attendance: 15,031; Referee: Ben Williams

15 March 2014 23	Central Coast Mariners	3–1	Newcastle Jets	Central Coast Stadium, Gosford
Saturday 20:00 AEDT	Bosnar 1'; Ibini 6'; G. Trifiro 88'	Report	J. Griffiths 23'	Attendance: 7,455; Referee: Peter Green

23 March 2014 24	Melbourne Heart	1–2	Central Coast Mariners	AAMI Park, Melbourne
Sunday 15:00 AEDT	Engelaar 34'	Report	Kim 45+2'; Ibini 77'	Attendance: 5,418; Referee: Hiroyuki Kimura (Japan)

29 March 2014 25	Central Coast Mariners	2–1	Western Sydney Wanderers	Central Coast Stadium, Gosford
Saturday 17:30 AEDT	Rose 32'; Ibini 90'	Report	Topor-Stanley 40'	Attendance: 13,157; Referee: Strebre Delovski

5 April 2014 26	Perth Glory	3–1	Central Coast Mariners	nib Stadium, Perth
Saturday 18:45 AWST	McGarry 8' (pen.); Sciola 71'; Anderson 85' (o.g.)	Report	Fitzgerald 19' (pen.)	Attendance: 11,127; Referee: Stephen Lucas

12 April 2014 27	Brisbane Roar	0–2	Central Coast Mariners	Suncorp Stadium, Brisbane
Saturday 19:30 AEST		Report	Fitzgerald 22'; Cáceres 28'	Attendance: 14,218; Referee: Kris Griffiths-Jones

==== Finals Series ====
19 April 2014 Elimination-finals	Central Coast Mariners	1–0	Adelaide United	Gosford
16:30 AEST	Ibini-Isei 67'			Stadium: Central Coast Stadium; Attendance: 9,045; Referee: Ben Williams

26 April 2014 Semi-finals	Western Sydney Wanderers	2–0	Central Coast Mariners	Sydney
18:30 AEST	Hersi 31'; La Rocca 81'			Stadium: Pirtek Stadium

==== League goalscorers per round ====
Total	Player		Goals per Round																										
Total	Player		1	2	3	4	5	6	7	8	9	10	11	12	13	14	15	16	17	18	19	20	21	22	23	24	25	26	27
5	(Australia)	Bernie Ibini																		1		1			1	1	1		
3	(Argentina)	Marcos Flores		2		1																							
3	(Australia)	Mile Sterjovski				1											1		1										
3	(Australia)	Mitchell Duke	1						1														1						
3	(Australia)	Nick Fitzgerald			1																							1	1
2	(New Zealand)	Michael McGlinchey							1					1															
2	(Australia)	Daniel McBreen									1							1											
2	(Australia)	Matt Simon														1		1											
2	(South Korea)	Kim Seung-Yong																					1			1			
2	(Australia)	Anthony Cáceres																1											1
1	(New Zealand)	Storm Roux						1																					
1	(Australia)	Trent Sainsbury												1															
1	(Australia)	Zachary Anderson																						1					
1	(Australia)	Eddy Bosnar																							1				
1	(Australia)	Glen Trifiro																							1				
1	(Australia)	Joshua Rose																							1		1		
32	TOTAL		1	2	1	2	0	1	2	0	1	0	0	2	0	1	1	3	1	1	0	1	2	1	3	2	2	1	2

Goal scored from penalty kick Two goals scored from penalty kick Player suspended Player injured/sick Player on international duty

==== Own goals ====
Player		Against	Week
(Australia)	Justin Pasfield	Newcastle Jets	4
(Australia)	Zachary Anderson	Perth Glory	26

=== AFC Champions League ===
==== Group stage ====
Pos	Team	Pld	W	D	L	GF	GA	GD	Pts	Qualification	SEO	HIR	BEI	CCM
1	(South Korea) FC Seoul	6	3	2	1	9	6	+3	11	Advance to knockout stage	—	2–2	2–1	2–0
2	(Japan) Sanfrecce Hiroshima	6	2	3	1	9	8	+1	9	Advance to knockout stage	2–1	—	1–1	1–0
3	(China) Beijing Guoan	6	1	3	2	7	8	−1	6		1–1	2–2	—	2–1
4	(Australia) Central Coast Mariners	6	2	0	4	4	7	−3	6		0–1	2–1	1–0	—

25 February 2014 1	FC Seoul (South Korea)	2–0	(Australia) Central Coast Mariners	Seoul, South Korea
Tuesday 19:30 KST	Osmar 33' (pen.); Il-Lok 57'	Report	Seip (red card) 84'	Stadium: Seoul World Cup Stadium; Attendance: 6,491; Referee: Fahad Al-Mirdasi (Saudi Arabia)

11 March 2014 2	Central Coast Mariners (Australia)	2–1	(Japan) Sanfrecce Hiroshima	Gosford, Australia
Tuesday 19:30 AEDT	Sterjovski 23', 32'	Report	Shiotani 21'	Stadium: Central Coast Stadium; Attendance: 2,168; Referee: Abdulrahman Abdou (Qatar)

19 March 2014 3	Beijing Guoan (China)	2–1	(Australia) Central Coast Mariners	Beijing, China
Wednesday 19:30 CST	Shao 45'; Utaka 63'	Report	Fitzgerald 85' (pen.)	Stadium: Workers Stadium; Attendance: 32,198; Referee: Nagor Amir Noor Mohamed (Malaysia)

1 April 2014 4	Central Coast Mariners (Australia)	1–0	(China) Beijing Guoan	Gosford, Australia
Tuesday 19:30 AEDT	Seip 73'	Report		Stadium: Central Coast Stadium; Attendance: 3,316; Referee: Hettikamkanamge Perera (Sri Lanka)

16 April 2014 5	Central Coast Mariners (Australia)	0–1	(South Korea) FC Seoul	Gosford, Australia
Wednesday 19:30 AEST		Report	Hutchinson 90+2' (o.g.)	Stadium: Central Coast Stadium; Attendance: 4,118; Referee: Ammar Al-Jeneibi (United Arab Emirates)

23 April 2014 6	Sanfrecce Hiroshima (Japan)	1–0	(Australia) Central Coast Mariners	Hiroshima, Japan
Wednesday 19:00 JST	Yamagishi 72'	Report	B. Griffiths (red card) 70'	Stadium: Hiroshima Athletic Stadium; Attendance: 9,778; Referee: Ravshan Irmatov (Uzbekistan)

==== Goalscorers ====
2 goals

- (Australia) Mile Sterjovski

1 goal

- (Australia) Nick Fitzgerald
- (Netherlands) Marcel Seip

Own goal

- (Malta) John Hutchinson

=== National Youth League ===
==== League table ====
Pos	Team	Pld	W	D	L	GF	GA	GD	Pts
1	Sydney FC Youth (C)	18	13	2	3	49	29	+20	41
2	Newcastle Jets Youth	18	11	4	3	50	29	+21	37
3	Melbourne Victory Youth	18	9	4	5	50	36	+14	31
4	Adelaide United Youth	18	9	3	6	41	36	+5	30
5	Melbourne Heart Youth	18	8	4	6	40	30	+10	28
6	Western Sydney Wanderers Youth	18	7	2	9	37	33	+4	23
7	Brisbane Roar Youth	18	6	5	7	41	45	−4	23
8	AIS Football Program	18	6	3	9	32	47	−15	21
9	Perth Glory Youth	18	5	0	13	35	67	−32	15
10	Central Coast Mariners Academy	18	1	3	14	20	43	−23	6

Source: au.soccerway.com
Rules for classification: 1) points; 2) goal difference; 3) number of goals scored.
(C) Champions

==== Results summary ====
Overall								Home						Away					
Pld	W	D	L	GF	GA	GD	Pts	W	D	L	GF	GA	GD	W	D	L	GF	GA	GD
18	1	3	14	20	43	−23	6	0	2	7	8	19	−11	1	1	7	12	24	−12

Last updated: 2 March 2014.
Source: Competitive Matches

==== Results by round ====
Round	1	2	3	4	5	6	7	8	9	10	11	12	13	14	15	16	17	18
Ground	H	A	H	H	A	H	A	A	H	H	A	A	H	A	A	H	H	A
Result	D	L	L	D	L	L	L	L	L	L	W	L	L	D	L	L	L	L
Position	6	8	8	8	10	10	10	10	10	10	10	10	10	10	10	10	10	10

A = Away; H = Home; W = Win; D = Draw; L = Loss

==== Matches ====
27 October 2013 1	Central Coast Mariners Youth	0–0	Adelaide United Youth	Tuggerah
10:30 AEDT		Report		Stadium: Central Coast Mariners Centre of Excellence; Attendance: 150; Referee: Stephen Lucas

3 November 2013 2	Newcastle Jets Youth	2–1	Central Coast Mariners Youth	Newcastle
15:00 AEDT	Pavicevic 7'; Forbes 22' (o.g.)	Report	Curran 19'	Stadium: Wanderers Oval; Attendance: 200; Referee: Trent Nash

9 November 2013 3	Central Coast Mariners Youth	1–2	Sydney FC Youth	Tuggerah
10:30 AEDT	Forbes 53'	Report	Tomelic 5'; Petkovski 56'; Burgess (red card) 77'	Stadium: Central Coast Mariners Centre of Excellence; Attendance: 80; Referee: Adam Gehrig

16 November 2013 4	Central Coast Mariners Youth	1–1	Brisbane Roar Youth	Tuggerah
15:00 AEDT	Kwasnik 32'	Report	Sibatuara 68'	Stadium: Central Coast Mariners Centre of Excellence; Attendance: 150; Referee: Trent Nash

24 November 2013 5	Perth Glory Youth	2–0	Central Coast Mariners Youth	Perth
10:00 AWST	O'Neill 23' (pen.); O'Brien 37'	Report		Stadium: Percy Doyle Reserve

30 November 2013 6	Central Coast Mariners Youth	1–3	Newcastle Jets Youth	Tuggerah
10:30 AEDT	Kwasnik 68'	Report	Bradbery 15'; Pavicevic 35'; Cooper 90+2'	Stadium: Central Coast Mariners Centre of Excellence; Attendance: 150; Referee: Adrian Arndt

8 December 2013 7	Western Sydney Wanderers Youth	3–0	Central Coast Mariners Youth	Blacktown
16:00 AEDT	Sotirio 31'; McGing 75'; Fofanah 90+2'	Report		Stadium: Blacktown Football Park

15 December 2013 8	Adelaide United Youth	4–2	Central Coast Mariners Youth	Adelaide
10:30 ACDT	Milesunic 59'; Costa 65'; Bladen 70'; Konstandopoulos 83'	Report	Kwasnik 11' (pen.); Griffiths (red card) 28'; Fitzgerald 44'; Neill (yellow card) 25' (red card) 75'	Stadium: Thebarton Oval; Referee: Kyle Bartlett

22 December 2013 9	Central Coast Mariners Youth	3–4	Melbourne Victory Youth	Tuggerah
14:30 AEDT	Whyte 17'; Bingham 25'; Griffiths 35'	Report	Makarounas 4'; Proia 37'; Murnane 51'; Cristaldo 57'	Stadium: Central Coast Mariners Centre of Excellence

4 January 2014 10	Central Coast Mariners Youth	0–2	Melbourne Heart Youth	Tuggerah
14:30 AEDT		Report	Garuccio 13'; Schroen 38'	Stadium: Central Coast Mariners Centre of Excellence; Referee: Lachlan Daneil

11 January 2014 11	AIS Football Program	2–5	Central Coast Mariners Youth	Canberra
15:00 AEDT	Rose 26'; Marino 73'	Report	Esposito 22'; Dixon 32'; Curran 44'; Morton 45+3'; Ferguson 56'	Stadium: AIS Grass Fields

19 January 2014 12	Sydney FC Youth	2–0	Central Coast Mariners Youth	Sydney
17:45 AEDT	Mallia 33'; Naumoff 36'	Report		Stadium: Sydney United Sports Centre

26 January 2014 13	Central Coast Mariners Youth	2–3	Western Sydney Wanderers Youth	Tuggerah
15:00 AEDT	Dixon 35'; Pandurevic 47'	Report	K. Appiah 6', 89'; Olsen 65'	Stadium: Central Coast Mariners Centre of Excellence

1 February 2014 14	Brisbane Roar Youth	0–0	Central Coast Mariners Youth	Brisbane
14:30 AEST		Report		Stadium: Goodwin Park

9 February 2014 15	Melbourne Victory Youth	5–2	Central Coast Mariners Youth	Melbourne
15:00 AEDT	Cristaldo 20', 33', 40'; Makarounas 50', 90+2'	Report	Bingham 11', 31' (pen.)	Stadium: Lakeside Stadium; Attendance: 50; Referee: Harley Natis

16 February 2014 16	Central Coast Mariners Youth	0–3	Perth Glory Youth	Lisarow
10:30 AEDT	B. Griffiths (red card) 45'; Verity (yellow card) ?' (red card) 90+1'	Report	Zahra 45' (pen.), 90+2'; Albano 87'	Stadium: Pluim Park; Referee: Lachlan Daniel

22 February 2014 17	Central Coast Mariners Youth	0–1	AIS Football Program	Lisarow
10:30 AEDT	Esposito (yellow card) 28' (red card) 79'	Report	Kalik 16' (pen.)	Stadium: Pluim Park; Attendance: 80; Referee: Lachlan Daniel

2 March 2014 18	Melbourne Heart Youth	4–2	Central Coast Mariners Youth	Melbourne
15:00 AEDT	O'Dea 4' (pen.), 10'; Retre 73'; Dao 74'	Report	G. Trifiro 6'; Dixon 90+2'	Stadium: Epping Stadium; Attendance: 200; Referee: Greg Gontscharow

==== League Goalscorers per Round ====
Total	Player		Goals per Round																	
Total	Player		1	2	3	4	5	6	7	8	9	10	11	12	13	14	15	16	17	18
3	(Australia)	Adam Kwasnik				1		1		1										
3	(Australia)	Josh Bingham									1						2			
3	(Australia)	Patrick Dixon											1		1					1
2	(Australia)	Jesse Curran		1									1							
1	(Australia)	Joshua Forbes			1															
1	(Australia)	Nick Fitzgerald								1										
1	(Australia)	Steve Whyte									1									
1	(Australia)	Brent Griffiths									1									
1	(Australia)	Jacob Esposito											1							
1	(Australia)	Hayden Morton											1							
1	(Australia)	Dominic Ferguson											1							
1	(Australia)	Dejan Pandurevic													1					
1	(Australia)	Glen Trifiro																		1
20	TOTAL		0	1	1	1	0	1	0	2	3	0	5	0	2	0	2	0	0	2

== Awards ==
- NAB Young Footballer of the Month (October) – Trent Sainsbury
- Player of the Week (Round 5) – Liam Reddy
- NAB Young Footballer of the Month (December) – Storm Roux
