= 2014–15 Central Coast Mariners FC season =

Central Coast Mariners
2014–15 season
- Chairman: Michael Charlesworth
- Manager: Phil Moss (to 6 March 2015) Tony Walmsley (Head Coach) & John Hutchinson (Interim Player/Coach) (from 6 March 2015)
- Stadium: Central Coast Stadium, Gosford
- A-League: 8th
- FFA Cup: Semi-finals
- AFC Champions League: Qualifying play-off
- Top goalscorer: League: Mitchell Duke, Matt Simon, Fábio Ferreira, Eddy Bosnar (3 goals); All: Matt Sim (5 goals)
- Highest home attendance: 12,102 vs Sydney FC; 24 January 2015
- Lowest home attendance: 4,508 vs Adelaide United; 7 February 2015
Home colours	Away colours	Third colours

The 2014–15 Central Coast Mariners FC season was the club's 10th season since its establishment in 2004. The club participated in the A-League for the 10th time and the FFA Cup for the first time.

== Players ==
=== Squad information ===
Note: Flags indicate national team as defined under FIFA eligibility rules; some limited exceptions apply. Players may hold more than one non-FIFA nationality.

No.	Pos.	Nation	Player
1	GK	AUS	Matthew Nash
2	DF	NZL	Storm Roux
3	DF	AUS	Joshua Rose
4	MF	AUS	Jacob Poscoliero
5	DF	AUS	Zachary Anderson
6	DF	AUS	Brent Griffiths
7	MF	MLT	John Hutchinson (Captain)
8	MF	SCO	Nick Montgomery (Vice-captain)
10	MF	AUS	Anthony Cáceres
11	FW	AUS	Nick Fitzgerald
12	GK	AUS	Liam Reddy
15	MF	AUS	Matt Sim

No.	Pos.	Nation	Player
16	MF	AUS	Liam Rose
17	MF	HUN	Richárd Vernes (on loan from Budapest Honvéd)
18	MF	AUS	Glen Trifiro
19	FW	AUS	Matt Simon
20	MF	AUS	Anthony Kalik
21	DF	AUS	Michael Neill
22	MF	AUS	Tom Slater
23	MF	AUS	Isaka Cernak
24	DF	AUS	Hayden Morton
25	DF	AUS	Eddy Bosnar
26	MF	POR	Fábio Ferreira
29	MF	AUS	Dejan Pandurevic

=== From youth squad ===
N	Pos.	Nat.	Name	Age	Notes

=== Transfers in ===
No.	Pos.	Nat.	Name	Age	Moving from	Type	Transfer window	Ends	Transfer fee	Source
20	MF	(Australia)	Anthony Kalik	16	Australian Institute of Sport	Transfer	Pre-season	2017		smh.com.au
16	MF	(Australia)	Liam Rose	17	Australian Institute of Sport	Transfer	Pre-season	2016		smh.com.au
14	FW	(Senegal)	Malick Mané	25	IFK Göteborg (Sweden)	Loan	Pre-season	2015		footballaustralia.com.au
1	GK	(Australia)	Matthew Nash	33	Bonnyrigg White Eagles	Transfer	Pre-season	2016		ccmariners.com.au
17	MF	(Hungary)	Richárd Vernes	22	Budapest Honvéd (Hungary)	Loan	Pre-season	2016		ccmariners.com.au
4	MF	(Australia)	Jacob Poscoliero	24	Blacktown City	Transfer	Pre-season	2015		a-league.com
27	DF	(Australia)	Zachary Cairncross	24	Blacktown City	Injury replacement	Round 2	2015		ccmariners.com.au
14	FW	(Australia)	Travis Major	24	Blacktown City	Transfer	Round 13	2015		ccmariners.com.au
29	MF	(Australia)	Dejan Pandurevic	17	Nike Academy (England)	Transfer	Round 14	2015		ccmariners.com.au
26	MF	(Portugal)	Fábio Ferreira	25	Adelaide United	Transfer	Round 16	2015		ccmariners.com.au

=== Transfers out ===
No.	Pos.	Nat.	Name	Age	Moving to	Type	Transfer window	Transfer fee	Source
21	FW	(Australia)	Mile Sterjovski	34		Retired	Pre-season		footballaustralia.com.au
23	FW	(Australia)	Adam Kwasnik	30		Retired	Pre-season		smh.com.au
1	GK	(Australia)	Justin Pasfield	29	Tampines Rovers (Singapore)	Released	Pre-season		tampinesroversfc.com
10	MF	(Argentina)	Marcos Flores	28	Newcastle Jets	End of contract	Pre-season		footballaustralia.com.au
4	DF	(Netherlands)	Marcel Seip	32	FC Emmen (Netherlands)	Released	Pre-season		fcemmen.nl
14	MF	(New Zealand)	Michael McGlinchey	27	Wellington Phoenix	Contract buyout	Pre-season		ccmariners.com.au
14	FW	(Senegal)	Malick Mané	25	IFK Göteborg (Sweden)	Loan terminated	Round 10		ccmariners.com.au
26	MF	(South Korea)	Kim Seung-yong	29	Qingdao Hainiu (China)	Released	Round 13		ccmariners.com.au
14	FW	(Australia)	Travis Major	25	Blacktown City	Released	Round 27		ccmariners.com.au

== Technical staff ==
Position	Name
Head Coach	(Australia) Tony Walmsley
Player/Coach	(Malta) John Hutchinson
Goalkeeping Coach	(Australia) John Crawley
Physiotherapist	(Australia) Tim Knight

== Statistics ==
=== Squad statistics ===
N	Pos.	Nat.	Name	Total					A-League					FFA Cup					AFC Champions League
N	Pos.	Nat.	Name	Apps	Goals	Yellow card	Second yellow card	Red card	Apps	Goals	Yellow card	Second yellow card	Red card	Apps	Goals	Yellow card	Second yellow card	Red card	Apps	Goals	Yellow card	Second yellow card	Red card
1	GK	(Australia)	Matthew Nash	2	0	0	0	0	2	0	0	0	0	0	0	0	0	0	0	0	0	0	0
2	DF	(New Zealand)	Storm Roux	20	0	4	0	0	15+2	0	4	0	0	2	0	0	0	0	1	0	0	0	0
3	FW	(Australia)	Josh Rose	28	3	5	0	0	24	2	5	0	0	3	1	0	0	0	1	0	0	0	0
4	MF	(Australia)	Jacob Poscoliero	18	0	4	0	0	17	0	3	0	0	0	0	0	0	0	1	0	1	0	0
5	DF	(Australia)	Zac Anderson	26	0	7	0	0	22	0	6	0	0	4	0	1	0	0	0	0	0	0	0
6	DF	(Australia)	Brent Griffiths	0	0	0	0	0	0	0	0	0	0	0	0	0	0	0	0	0	0	0	0
7	MF	(Malta)	John Hutchinson	30	1	8	0	0	25+1	1	8	0	0	3+1	0	0	0	0	0	0	0	0	0
8	MF	(Scotland)	Nick Montgomery	23	1	5	1	0	18+2	1	4	1	0	2	0	1	0	0	1	0	0	0	0
10	MF	(Australia)	Anthony Cáceres	31	1	0	0	0	25+1	1	0	0	0	3+1	0	0	0	0	1	0	0	0	0
11	FW	(Australia)	Nick Fitzgerald	31	3	2	0	0	22+5	2	1	0	0	3	1	0	0	0	0+1	0	1	0	0
12	GK	(Australia)	Liam Reddy	30	0	2	0	0	25	0	2	0	0	4	0	0	0	0	1	0	0	0	0
15	MF	(Australia)	Matt Sim	22	5	2	0	0	8+10	0	1	0	0	2+1	5	1	0	0	1	0	0	0	0
16	MF	(Australia)	Liam Rose	7	0	1	0	0	3+4	0	1	0	0	0	0	0	0	0	0	0	0	0	0
17	MF	(Hungary)	Richárd Vernes	10	1	1	0	0	5+3	1	1	0	0	2	0	0	0	0	0	0	0	0	0
18	MF	(Australia)	Glen Trifiro	25	4	1	0	0	7+14	1	0	0	0	2+1	2	1	0	0	0+1	1	0	0	0
19	FW	(Australia)	Matt Simon	13	4	3	0	0	8+3	3	3	0	0	0+1	1	0	0	0	1	0	0	0	0
20	MF	(Australia)	Anthony Kalik	8	0	0	0	0	3+4	0	0	0	0	0+1	0	0	0	0	0	0	0	0	0
21	DF	(Australia)	Michael Neill	9	0	0	0	0	8	0	0	0	0	1	0	0	0	0	0	0	0	0	0
22	MF	(Australia)	Tom Slater	1	0	0	0	0	0	0	0	0	0	0+1	0	0	0	0	0	0	0	0	0
23	MF	(Australia)	Isaka Cernak	23	2	5	0	0	12+6	1	3	0	0	3+1	1	2	0	0	0+1	0	0	0	0
24	DF	(Australia)	Hayden Morton	5	0	1	0	0	3	0	1	0	0	2	0	0	0	0	0	0	0	0	0
25	DF	(Australia)	Eddy Bosnar	22	3	7	0	0	17+1	3	6	0	0	3	0	1	0	0	1	0	0	0	0
26	DF	(Portugal)	Fábio Ferreira	10	3	1	0	0	9	3	1	0	0	0	0	0	0	0	1	0	0	0	0
30	GK	(Australia)	Adam Pearce	0	0	0	0	0	0	0	0	0	0	0	0	0	0	0	0	0	0	0	0
Players no longer at the club:
9	FW	(Australia)	Mitchell Duke	18	3	1	0	0	12+3	3	1	0	0	3	0	0	0	0	0	0	0	0	0
14	FW	(Senegal)	Malick Mané	6	0	0	0	0	3+1	0	0	0	0	1+1	0	0	0	0	0	0	0	0	0
14	FW	(Australia)	Travis Major	10	1	0	0	0	0+9	1	0	0	0	0	0	0	0	0	1	0	0	0	0
26	MF	(South Korea)	Kim Seung-Yong	6	1	1	0	0	2+3	1	1	0	0	1	0	0	0	0	0	0	0	0	0
27	DF	(Australia)	Zachary Cairncross	0	0	0	0	0	0	0	0	0	0	0	0	0	0	0	0	0	0	0	0
28	MF	(Australia)	Josh Bingham	4	0	0	0	0	0+3	0	0	0	0	0+1	0	0	0	0	0	0	0	0	0

- Last updated: 26 April 2015
- Source: ccmariners.com.au
- (yellow card) = Number of bookings; (second yellow card) = Number of sending offs after a second yellow card; (red card) = Number of sending offs by a direct red card.

== Pre-season and friendlies ==
12 August 2014	Central Coast Mariners	4–1	(New South Wales) Central Coast Mariners Academy	Lisarow
Tuesday 19:00 AEST	Bosnar 41'; Trifiro 55'; Fitzgerald 72' (pen.); Petrillo 84'	Report	L. Bozanic 60' (pen.)	Stadium: Pluim Park

26 August 2014	Marconi Stallions (New South Wales)	Cancelled	Central Coast Mariners	Bossley Park
Tuesday 19:00 AEST		Report		Stadium: Marconi Stadium

28 August 2014 Doug Turnbull Cup	Bankstown City (New South Wales)	Cancelled	Central Coast Mariners	Sefton
Thursday 19:00 AEST		Report		Stadium: Jensen Oval

7 September 2014 Craig Foster Cup	Melbourne City	1–1	Central Coast Mariners	Lismore
Sunday 14:30 AEST	Wielaert 56'	Report	Mané 57' (pen.)	Stadium: Oakes Oval; Attendance: 4,015; Referee: Jarred Gillett

12 September 2014	Brisbane Roar	1–1	Central Coast Mariners	Herston
Friday 15:45 AEST	Henrique 79'	Report	Fitzgerald 43'	Stadium: Ballymore Stadium; Referee: Jason Crow

20 September 2014	Central Coast Mariners	0–0	Newcastle Jets	Mudgee
Saturday 16:00 AEST		Report		Stadium: Glen Willow Regional Sporting Stadium; Referee: Steve Lucas

24 September 2014	Central Coast Mariners	1–5	(Australia) Young Socceroos	Gosford
Wednesday		Report		Stadium: Central Coast Stadium; Attendance: 0 (Behind closed doors)

30 September 2014	Central Coast Mariners	1–3	(New South Wales) Sydney Olympic	Lisarow
Tuesday 19:30 AEST	Sim 71'	Report	Spyrakis 47'; Hatzimouratzis 56'; Godoy-Bascur 65'	Stadium: Pluim Park

23 May 2015 John Hutchinson Testimonial Match	Hutch's XI	12–5	Central Coast Mariners	Lisarow
Sunday 18:00 AEST		Report		Stadium: Pluim Park; Attendance: 3,000

1. Hutch's XI are a squad handpicked and captained by John Hutchinson and includes: Danny Vuković, Andrew Clark, Tony Vidmar, Chris Doig, Nigel Boogaard, Michael Beauchamp, Patrick Zwaanswijk, Dean Heffernan, Matthew Osman, Vuko Tomasevic, Matt Crowell, André Gumprecht, Rostyn Griffiths, Sasho Petrovski, Tom Pondeljak, Bernie Ibini, Mile Sterjovski, Adam Kwasnik, Matt Simon.

== Competitions ==
=== Overall ===
Competition	Started round	Final position / round	First match	Last match
A-League	—	8th	11 October 2014	26 April 2015
FFA Cup	Round of 32	Semi-finals	20 August 2014	12 November 2014
AFC Champions League	Qualifying play-off	Qualifying play-off	17 February 2015	17 February 2015

=== A-League ===
==== League table ====
Pos	Team	Pld	W	D	L	GF	GA	GD	Pts	Qualification
1	Melbourne Victory (C)	27	15	8	4	56	31	+25	53	Qualification for 2016 AFC Champions League group stage and Finals series
2	Sydney FC	27	14	8	5	52	35	+17	50	Qualification for 2016 AFC Champions League group stage and Finals series
3	Adelaide United	27	14	4	9	47	32	+15	46	Qualification for 2016 AFC Champions League qualifying play-off and Finals series
4	Wellington Phoenix (Note: Wellington Phoenix cannot qualify for the AFC Champions League as they are not recognised as an AFC club.)	27	14	4	9	45	35	+10	46	Qualification for Finals series
5	Melbourne City	27	9	8	10	36	41	−5	35	Qualification for Finals series
6	Brisbane Roar	27	10	4	13	42	43	−1	34	Qualification for Finals series
7	Perth Glory (Note: Perth Glory disqualified from the Finals series and given a compulsory 7th-place finish due to salary cap violations.)	27	14	8	5	45	35	+10	50	
8	Central Coast Mariners	27	5	8	14	26	50	−24	23	
9	Western Sydney Wanderers	27	4	6	17	29	44	−15	18	
10	Newcastle Jets	27	3	8	16	23	55	−32	17	

Source: A-League
Rules for classification: 1) points; 2) goal difference; 3) number of goals scored.
(C) Champions

==== Results summary ====
Overall								Home						Away					
Pld	W	D	L	GF	GA	GD	Pts	W	D	L	GF	GA	GD	W	D	L	GF	GA	GD
27	5	8	14	26	50	−24	23	5	2	6	13	20	−7	0	6	8	13	30	−17

Last updated: 26 April 2015.
Source: ultimatealeague.com

==== Results by round ====
Round	1	2	3	4	5	6	7	8	9	10	11	12	13	14	15	16	17	18	19	20	21	22	23	24	25	26	27
Ground	H	H	A	A	H	A	H	A	H	A	A	H	A	H	H	H	H	A	A	H	A	H	A	A	H	A	A
Result	W	L	D	L	L	D	L	D	L	D	L	D	D	W	L	W	L	L	D	W	L	D	L	L	W	L	L
Position	4	6	6\7 (Note: Round 3 was postponed (played between rounds 6 and 7) due to Western Sydney Wanderers hosting the home leg of the 2014 AFC Champions League Final. The first position (6) is after the non-postponed matches of round 3. The second position (7) is after the postponed match.)	6	7	7	7	6	8	8	8	8	8	8	8	8	8	8	8	8	8	8	8	8	8	8	8

Updated to match(es) played on 26 April 2015. Source: ultimatealeague.com
A = Away; H = Home; W = Win; D = Draw; L = Loss

==== Matches ====
11 October 2014 1	Central Coast Mariners	1–0	Newcastle Jets	Central Coast Stadium, Gosford
Saturday 17:00 AEDT	Duke 90+2'	Report		Attendance: 10,443; Referee: Kris Griffiths-Jones

18 October 2014 2	Central Coast Mariners	1–2	Wellington Phoenix	Central Coast Stadium, Gosford
Saturday 17:00 AEDT	Doyle 12' (o.g.)	Report	McGlinchey 35'; Burns 54'	Attendance: 7,237; Referee: Ben Williams

19 November 2014; Rescheduled 3	Western Sydney Wanderers	0–0	Central Coast Mariners	Pirtek Stadium, Parramatta
Wednesday 19:30 AEDT		Report		Attendance: 14,691; Referee: Kris Griffiths-Jones

2 November 2014 4	Sydney FC	2–0	Central Coast Mariners	Allianz Stadium, Sydney
Sunday 17:00 AEDT	Antonis 21'; Ognenovski 25'	Report		Attendance: 17,761; Referee: Strebre Delovski

9 November 2014 5	Central Coast Mariners	0–1	Perth Glory	Central Coast Stadium, Gosford
Sunday 17:00 AEDT		Report	Marinković 43'	Attendance: 6,399; Referee: Peter Green

16 November 2014 6	Melbourne City	2–2	Central Coast Mariners	AAMI Park, Melbourne
Sunday 17:00 AEDT	Dugandzic 10'; Paartalu 53'	Report	G. Trifiro 80'; Hutchinson 90+4'	Attendance: 9,402; Referee: Adam Fielding

23 November 2014 7	Central Coast Mariners	0–2	Adelaide United	Central Coast Stadium, Gosford
Sunday 17:00 AEDT	Montgomery (yellow card) 44' (yellow-red card) 71'	Report	Sánchez 40', 42'	Attendance: 6,404; Referee: Jarred Gillett

30 November 2014 8	Newcastle Jets	1–1	Central Coast Mariners	Hunter Stadium, Newcastle
Sunday 17:00 AEDT	Montaño 48'	Report	Vernes 55'	Attendance: 11,031; Referee: Shaun Evans

5 December 2014 9	Central Coast Mariners	0–3	Melbourne Victory	North Sydney Oval, North Sydney
Friday 19:40 AEDT		Report	Berisha 62'; Georgievski 68'; Pain 73'	Attendance: 7,098; Referee: Strebre Delovski

13 December 2014 10	Wellington Phoenix	1–1	Central Coast Mariners	Eden Park, Auckland
Saturday 17:00 NZDT	Krishna 76'	Report	Simon 40'	Attendance: 11,051; Referee: Allan Milliner

20 December 2014 11	Perth Glory	4–1	Central Coast Mariners	nib Stadium, Perth
Saturday 18:30 AWST	Harold 33', 78'; Keogh 35'; De Silva 71'	Report	Simon 49'	Attendance: 9,660; Referee: Peter Green

27 December 2014 12	Central Coast Mariners	3–3	Brisbane Roar	Central Coast Stadium, Gosford
Saturday 17:00 AEDT	Bosnar 57'; Simon 63'; Kim 80'	Report	Solórzano 45', 82'; Donachie 71'	Attendance: 10,019; Referee: Matthew Conger

1 January 2015 13	Western Sydney Wanderers	0–0	Central Coast Mariners	Pirtek Stadium, Parramatta
Thursday 19:30 AEDT		Report		Attendance: 14,137; Referee: Strebre Delovski

4 January 2015 14	Central Coast Mariners	2–0	Melbourne City	Central Coast Stadium, Gosford
Sunday 17:00 AEDT	Duke 12', 27'	Report	Velaphi (red card) 58'	Attendance: 7,409; Referee: Peter Green

24 January 2015 15	Central Coast Mariners	1–5	Sydney FC	Central Coast Stadium, Gosford
Saturday 19:30 AEDT	Major 66'	Report	Janko 15', 48'; Naumoff 18'; Ibini 44'; Brosque 71'	Attendance: 12,102; Referee: Jarred Gillett

7 February 2015 16	Central Coast Mariners	2–1	Adelaide United	Central Coast Stadium, Gosford
Saturday 17:00 AEDT	Fitzgerald 79'; J. Rose 83'	Report	Mabil 29'	Attendance: 4,508; Referee: Alan Milliner

13 February 2015 17	Central Coast Mariners	0–2	Brisbane Roar	Central Coast Stadium, Gosford
Friday 19:30 AEDT		Report	Solórzano 50' (pen.); Kaluđerović 90+2' (pen.)	Attendance: 6,021; Referee: Kris Griffiths-Jones

21 February 2015 18	Sydney FC	4–2	Central Coast Mariners	Allianz Stadium, Sydney
Saturday 17:00 AEDT	Janko 14', 90+2'; Grant 68'; Smeltz 82'	Report	Ferreira 45+1', 58'	Attendance: 14,239; Referee: Matthew Conger

28 February 2015 19	Newcastle Jets	0–0	Central Coast Mariners	Hunter Stadium, Newcastle
Saturday 17:00 AEDT		Report		Attendance: 7,991; Referee: Adam Fielding

8 March 2015 20	Central Coast Mariners	1–0	Melbourne City	Central Coast Stadium, Gosford
Sunday 15:00 AEDT	Ferreira 74'	Report		Attendance: 6,079; Referee: Jarred Gillett

12 March 2015 21	Adelaide United	2–1	Central Coast Mariners	Coopers Stadium, Adelaide
Thursday 19:00 ACDT	Carrusca 25'; Goodwin 67'	Report	Cáceres 23'	Attendance: 7,767; Referee: Yudai Yamamoto (Japan)

22 March 2015 22	Central Coast Mariners	1–1	Perth Glory	Central Coast Stadium, Gosford
Sunday 15:00 AEDT	Montgomery 90+2'	Report	Maclaren 79'	Attendance: 5,338; Referee: Ben Williams

27 March 2015 23	Melbourne Victory	2–1	Central Coast Mariners	AAMI Park, Melbourne
Friday 19:30 AEDT	Finkler 40', 78'	Report	Cernak 31'	Attendance: 18,205; Referee: Jarred Gillett

2 April 2015 24	Brisbane Roar	6–1	Central Coast Mariners	Suncorp Stadium, Brisbane
Thursday 19:00 AEST	Kaluđerović 21'; Lustica 28', 41', 79'; Clut 48'; Borrello 50'	Report	Bowles 64' (o.g.)	Attendance: 6,148; Referee: Kazuyoshi Enomoto (Japan)

11 April 2015 25	Central Coast Mariners	1–0	Western Sydney Wanderers	Central Coast Stadium, Gosford
Saturday 19:30 AEST	J. Rose 2'	Report		Attendance: 9,548; Referee: Adam Fielding

17 April 2015 26	Wellington Phoenix	3–2	Central Coast Mariners	Westpac Stadium, Wellington
Friday 19:30 NZST	Bonevacia 65'; Cunningham 79', 90+5'	Report	Fitzgerald 11'; Bosnar 35'	Attendance: 6,868; Referee: Peter O'Leary

26 April 2015 27	Melbourne Victory	3–1	Central Coast Mariners	AAMI Park, Melbourne
Sunday 17:00 AEST	Georgievski 32'; Thompson 34'; Berisha 47'	Report	Bosnar 45'	Attendance: 22,285; Referee: Peter Green

=== FFA Cup ===
20 August 2014 Round of 32	South Coast Wolves (New South Wales)	0–1	Central Coast Mariners	WIN Stadium, Wollongong
Wednesday 19:30 AEST		Report	G. Trifiro 13'	Attendance: 5,238; Referee: Ben Williams

16 September 2014 Round of 16	Olympic FC (Queensland)	1–3	Central Coast Mariners	QSAC, Brisbane
Tuesday 19:30 AEST	McLean 57'	Report	Fitzgerald 2'; Sim 38'; G. Trifiro 86'	Attendance: 1,374; Referee: Chris Beath

14 October 2014 Quarter-final	Palm Beach (Queensland)	0–5	Central Coast Mariners	Cbus Super Stadium, Robina
Tuesday 18:30 AEST		Report	Cernak 28'; Sim 72', 75', 90', 90+2'	Attendance: 2,035; Referee: Jarred Gillett

12 November 2014 Semi-final	Adelaide United	3–2	Central Coast Mariners	Coopers Stadium, Adelaide
Wednesday 19:00 ACDT	Cirio 40', 88'; Mabil 44'	Report	Simon 48'; J. Rose 90+3'	Attendance: 4,548; Referee: Chris Beath

=== AFC Champions League ===
==== Qualifying play-off ====
17 February 2015 Play-off round	Central Coast Mariners (Australia)	1–3	(China) Guangzhou R&F	Central Coast Stadium, Gosford
Tuesday 19:30 AEDT	G. Trifiro 90+2'	Report	Jiang 8'; Lu 57'; J. Rose 89' (o.g.)	Attendance: 2,776; Referee: Kim Dong-jin (South Korea)
