= Mitch Duke =

Australian soccer player (born 1991)

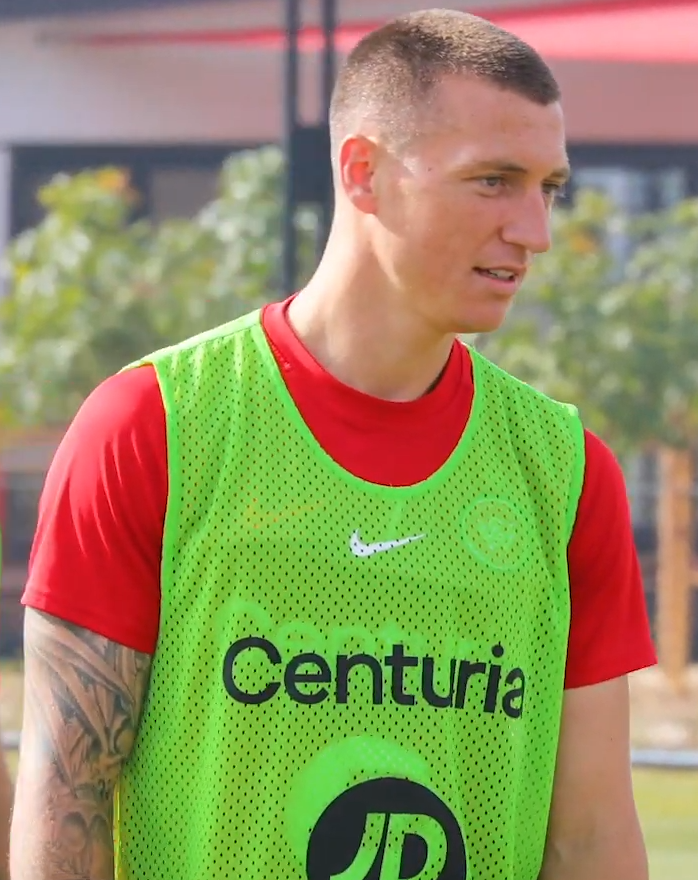
- Duke training with Western Sydney Wanderers in 2020

Personal information
- Full name: Mitchell Thomas Duke
- Date of birth: 18 January 1991 (age 35)
- Place of birth: Liverpool, New South Wales, Australia
- Height: 1.82 m (6 ft 0 in)
- Position: Striker

Team information
- Current team: Machida Zelvia

Youth career
- –2009: Parramatta Eagles

Senior career*
Years	Team	Apps	(Gls)
2009–2010	Parramatta Eagles		
2010–2015	Central Coast Mariners	66	(13)
2011	→ Blacktown City (loan)	21	(4)
2015–2018	Shimizu S-Pulse	89	(3)
2019–2020	Western Sydney Wanderers	37	(18)
2020–2021	Al-Taawoun	12	(0)
2021	→ Western Sydney Wanderers (loan)	17	(6)
2021–2022	Fagiano Okayama	51	(11)
2023–2025	Machida Zelvia	85	(15)
2025–2026	Macarthur FC	13	(5)
2026–	Machida Zelvia	11	(1)

International career
2021	Australia Olympic	4	(1)
2013–2026	Australia	50	(13)
- * Club domestic league appearances and goals as of 8 November 2026

Mitchell Thomas Duke (born 18 January 1991) is an Australian professional soccer player who plays as a striker for Machida Zelvia in the J1 League.

Duke was born in Liverpool, New South Wales and played youth soccer with Parramatta Eagles before starting his professional career with Central Coast Mariners. He joined J-League side Shimizu S-Pulse and Fagiano Okayama in 2015 and 2021 respectively.

He represented Australia at the 2023 AFC Asian Cup, 2022 FIFA World Cup, and Australia Olympic at the 2020 Summer Olympics.

== Early life ==
Duke was born in Liverpool, in Sydney's south-west. He attended All Saints Catholic College, Liverpool and All Saints Catholic Senior College Casula.

== Club career ==
Duke began his career with Parramatta Eagles before moving into the Central Coast Mariners' youth team. On 9 February 2011, Duke made his senior debut for the Mariners and also scored his first goal in a 3–1 win over Gold Coast United.

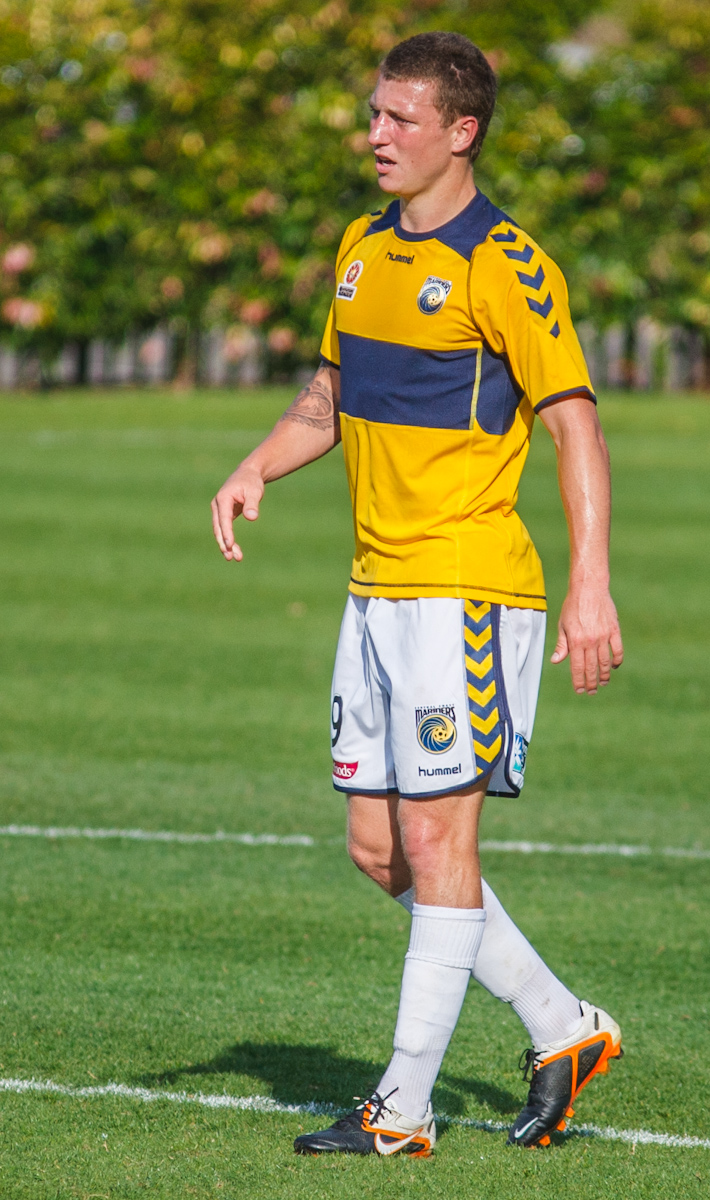
Duke playing for Central Coast Mariners in 2010

On 24 January 2012, it was announced he had signed his first senior contract signing a two-year contract with Central Coast Mariners.

In August 2013, Duke had a two-week trial with English Premier League side West Ham United.

In the 2012–13 season, Duke scored 6 goals from 21 games. In the 2013–14 season, he was not as prolific, scoring 3 goals in 29 games. In the 2014–15 season, he had 3 goals from 15 games. The decrease in goals can be attributed to Duke being played increasingly on the right wing by coach Phil Moss rather than the centre forward position he began his career playing.

On 9 February 2015, Duke announced that he was flying to Japan to complete a move to Shimizu S-Pulse. In April 2016, Duke suffered an anterior cruciate ligament injury, ruling him out of football for at least six months.

Duke left Shimizu in December 2018, after four seasons with the club.

On 25 January 2019, Duke announced that he had moved back home and signed with Western Sydney Wanderers FC and captained the club.

On 22 August 2020, Duke signed a two-year deal with Al-Taawoun. He scored the winning goal against Al-Duhail in an AFC Champions League group stage fixture on 25 September 2020 but fell out of favour with the club leadership shortly after, having moved from his forward position to the wing. On 1 February 2021, Duke returned to Australia and signed for his former club Western Sydney Wanderers on loan for the remainder of the 2020–21 A-League season.

On 5 August 2021, Duke joined Fagiano Okayama.

On 30 December 2022, it was announced that Duke had officially transferred to Machida Zelvia for the upcoming 2023 J2 League season. He scored 10 goals in the J2 League and helped Zelvia to promotion from the J2 League to the J1 League.

On 22 November 2025, he assisted Yūki Sōma's match winning goal in a 3–1 victory against Vissel Kobe in the final of the 2025 Emperor's Cup.

On 27 December 2025, Macarthur FC announced that Duke would join the club until the end of the 2025–26 season. At the end of the season, having missed World Cup selection, Duke returned to Machida Zelvia for the following season.

== International career ==
Duke was included in the Australian national team in July 2013, for the 2013 EAFF East Asian Cup. Duke made his international tournament debut against South Korea in the first match of the tournament, in a draw. He scored his first international goal in the next match, a 3–2 loss to Japan. Duke scored again in the following match which Australia lost 4–3 to China.

7 September 2013, Duke next played for the Socceroos in a 0–6 friendly loss to Brazil, at Estadio Nacional Mane Garrincha in Brasília. Mitch came on as a second-half substitute for Josh Kennedy in the 78th minute.

Duke qualified for the Tokyo 2020 Olympics. He was included in the Olyroos Olympic squad. They defeated Argentina in their first group match but, unable to win another match, they never were in contention for a medal.

He featured in Australia's team in the 2022 FIFA World Cup in Qatar. In the team's second match against Tunisia on 26 November 2022, he scored the only goal in a 1–0 win, Australia's first World Cup win since 2010.

== Career statistics ==
=== Club ===
As of match played 10 August 2026

Appearances and goals by club, season and competition
Club	Season	League			National cup (Note: Includes appearances in the Australian FFA Cup and Japanese Emperor's Cup)		League Cup (Note: Includes appearances in the NSW Waratah Cup and Japanese J.League Cup)		Continental		Total	
Club	Season	Division	Apps	Goals	Apps	Goals	Apps	Goals	Apps	Goals	Apps	Goals
Central Coast Mariners	2010–11	A-League	1	1	—		—		0	0	1	1
Central Coast Mariners	2011–12	A-League	0	0	—		—		1	0	1	0
Central Coast Mariners	2012–13	A-League	21	6	—		—		7	2	28	8
Central Coast Mariners	2013–14	A-League	29	3	—		—		6	0	35	3
Central Coast Mariners	2014–15	A-League	15	3	3	0	—		—		18	3
Central Coast Mariners	Total		66	13	3	0	—		14	2	83	15
Blacktown City Demons (loan)	2011	NSW PL	21	4	0	0	2	1	—		23	5
Shimizu S-Pulse	2015	J1 League	29	1	0	0	3	0	—		32	1
Shimizu S-Pulse	2016	J2 League	7	1	0	0	—		—		7	1
Shimizu S-Pulse	2017	J1 League	31	1	1	1	6	0	—		38	2
Shimizu S-Pulse	2018	J1 League	22	0	1	0	4	1	—		27	1
Shimizu S-Pulse	Total		89	3	2	1	13	1	—		104	5
Western Sydney Wanderers	2018–19	A-League	11	4	0	0	—		—		11	4
Western Sydney Wanderers	2019–20	A-League	26	14	0	0	—		—		26	14
Western Sydney Wanderers	Total		37	18	0	0	—		—		37	18
Al Taawoun	2020–21	Saudi Professional League	12	0	1	0	—		5	1	18	1
Western Sydney Wanderers (loan)	2020–21	A-League	17	6	0	0	—		—		17	6
Fagiano Okayama	2021	J2 League	14	3	0	0	—		—		14	3
Fagiano Okayama	2022	J2 League	36	8	0	0	—		—		36	8
Fagiano Okayama	Total		49	11	0	0	—		—		49	11
Machida Zelvia	2023	J2 League	34	10	2	1	—		—		36	11
Machida Zelvia	2024	J1 League	33	4	1	0	3	2	—		37	6
Machida Zelvia	Total		67	14	3	1	3	2	—		73	17
Macarthur FC	2025-26	A-League	13	5	0	0	0	0	2	0	15	5
Machida Zelvia	2026-27	J League	1	1	0	0	0	0	0	0	1	1
Total			317	63	19	2	18	4	21	3	375	72

=== International ===
Appearances and goals by national team and year
National team	Year	Apps	Goals
Australia	2013	4	2
Australia	2014	0	0
Australia	2015	0	0
Australia	2016	0	0
Australia	2017	0	0
Australia	2018	0	0
Australia	2019	2	0
Australia	2020	0	0
Australia	2021	9	5
Australia	2022	8	2
Australia	2023	9	2
Australia	2024	13	1
Australia	2025	5	1
Total		50	13

As of 10 June 2024

Scores and results list Australia's goal tally first, score column indicates score after each Duke goal.

List of international goals scored by Mitchell Duke
No.	Date	Venue	Cap	Opponent	Score	Result	Competition
1	25 July 2013	Hwaseong Stadium, Hwaseong, South Korea	2	Japan	1–2	2–3	2013 EAFF East Asian Cup
2	28 July 2013	Olympic Stadium, Seoul, South Korea	3	China	3–4	3–4	2013 EAFF East Asian Cup
3	7 June 2021	Jaber Al-Ahmad International Stadium, Kuwait City, Kuwait	8	Chinese Taipei	4–0	5–1	2022 FIFA World Cup qualification
4	7 June 2021	Jaber Al-Ahmad International Stadium, Kuwait City, Kuwait	8	Chinese Taipei	5–1	5–1	2022 FIFA World Cup qualification
5	2 September 2021	Khalifa International Stadium, Doha, Qatar	10	China	3–0	3–0	2022 FIFA World Cup qualification
6	7 October 2021	Khalifa International Stadium, Doha, Qatar	12	Oman	3–1	3–1	2022 FIFA World Cup qualification
7	16 November 2021	Sharjah Stadium, Sharjah, United Arab Emirates	15	China	1–0	1–1	2022 FIFA World Cup qualification
8	25 September 2022	Eden Park, Auckland, New Zealand	21	New Zealand	1–0	2–0	Friendly
9	26 November 2022	Al Janoub Stadium, Al Wakrah, Qatar	23	Tunisia	1–0	1–0	2022 FIFA World Cup
10	16 November 2023	Melbourne Rectangular Stadium, Melbourne, Australia	31	Bangladesh	3–0	7–0	2026 FIFA World Cup qualification
11	16 November 2023	Melbourne Rectangular Stadium, Melbourne, Australia	31	Bangladesh	4–0	7–0	2026 FIFA World Cup qualification
12	6 January 2024	Baniyas Stadium, Abu Dhabi, United Arab Emirates	33	Bahrain	2–0	2–0	Friendly
13	10 June 2025	King Abdullah Sports City, Jeddah, Saudi Arabia	48	Saudi Arabia	2–1	2–1	2026 FIFA World Cup qualification

== Honours ==
Central Coast Mariners

- A-League Championship: 2012–2013

Machida Zelvia

- J2 League: 2023
- Emperor's Cup: 2025

== See also ==
- List of Central Coast Mariners FC players
