= Isaka Cernak =

Australian soccer player

Isaka Čerňák
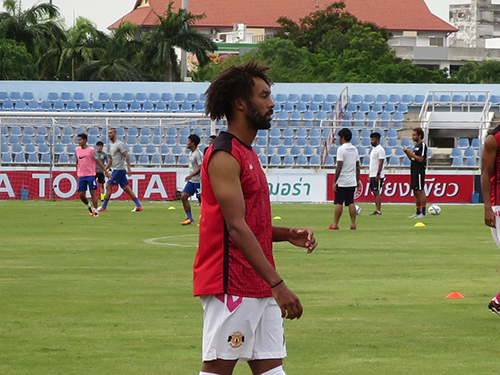
- Cernak playing for Sisaket FC 2017

Personal information
- Full name: Isaka Aongor Čerňák-Okanya
- Date of birth: 9 April 1989 (age 37)
- Place of birth: Galiwin'ku, Northern Territory, Australia
- Height: 1.79 m (5 ft 10 in)
- Position: Attacking midfielder

Youth career
- Peninsula Power
- Westside FC
- Brisbane City
- 2004–2006: QAS
- 2007: AIS Football Program

Senior career*
Years	Team	Apps	(Gls)
2007	AIS	20	(4)
2008–2009	Brisbane Roar	5	(0)
2010	North Queensland Fury	11	(3)
2011–2012	Melbourne Victory	19	(1)
2013	Wellington Phoenix	8	(2)
2014	Perth Glory	10	(1)
2015	Central Coast Mariners	9	(2)
2016	Supersport United	10	(1)
2017	Sisaket	21	(5)
2018–2019	Home United	9	(0)
2020	Phrae United	2	(0)
2021–2022	Olympic FC	24	(1)

International career^{‡}
2007–2009	Australia U-20	19	(5)
2010–2011	Australia U-23	5	(1)

Managerial career
- 2023–: Brisbane Roar FC women (assistant)
- * Club domestic league appearances and goals as of 6 November 2021 ‡ National team caps and goals as of 23 June 2011

Isaka Aongor Čerňák-Okanya (born 9 April 1989) is an Australian professional footballer who lasted plays as an attacking midfielder for Olympic FC.

== Club career ==
=== Youth career ===
In his youth football playing days, Cernak played for the Peninsula Power, Westside FC, Brisbane City, QAS and the AIS football teams.

=== Brisbane Roar ===
In 2008 Isaka Cernak joined A-League team Brisbane Roar (then called Queensland Roar), making 15 appearances and scoring a goal in his two seasons with the club. On 24 January 2009, Cernak made his senior debut as a substitute for Brisbane Roar against Perth Glory in a 4–2 win. In 2010, he left the Roar to join state rivals the North Queensland Fury.

=== North Queensland Fury ===
In June 2010, Isaka signed a deal with North Queensland Fury to become their 15th signed player for their upcoming season. He made 14 appearances for the Fury, scoring one goal in his season with the Fury. Unfortunately for Cernak, the Fury were unable to extend his contract due to FFA ownership of the club.

=== Melbourne Victory ===
During the 2010–11 season Melbourne Victory signed Cernak for the following season and Asian Champions League campaign as a replacement for departing striker Robbie Kruse to Bundesliga 2 club Fortuna Düsseldorf, with Fury unable to extend his contract due to FFA ownership of the club.

=== Wellington Phoenix ===
After being released by Melbourne during the January transfer window Cernak signed with Wellington Phoenix until the end of the season, having already agreeing to terms with Perth Glory for the following season.

=== Perth Glory ===
Just a few months after signing with Wellington Phoenix, Cernak signed with Perth Glory.

=== Central Coast Mariners ===
In February 2014 Isaka signed for reigning A-League champions Central Coast Mariners. Isaka stated upon signing: "Being able to have one-and-a-half years to learn as a footballer off 'Mossy' (Phil Moss) and the players at Central Coast Mariners is really exciting for me."

He was released from the Mariners in 2015 after the club opted against renewing his contract.

=== SuperSport United ===
He joined South African side SuperSport United in June 2015 on a 3-year deal. However, Isaka struggled to make an impact and made just 7 league appearances before he sustained a knee injury that required surgery, ruling him out for the rest of the season. He subsequently agreed to a contract termination.

=== Sisaket ===
Isaka next joined Thai League club Sisaket where he made 14 appearances and scored 1 goal.

=== Home United ===
His signing for Singapore Premier League side Home United was announced on 13 July 2018, coming in to fill the vacant slot for foreign players left by Sirina Camara (whose season had been prematurely cut short by an ACL injury). He made his debut for the Protectors in a Singapore Cup loss against Tampines Rovers where he was introduced as a substitute. He followed up his debut by scoring his first goal for the club in the AFC Cup ASEAN Zone Finals a week later, scoring the goal that earned his team a 1–1 draw in the first-leg.

== International career ==
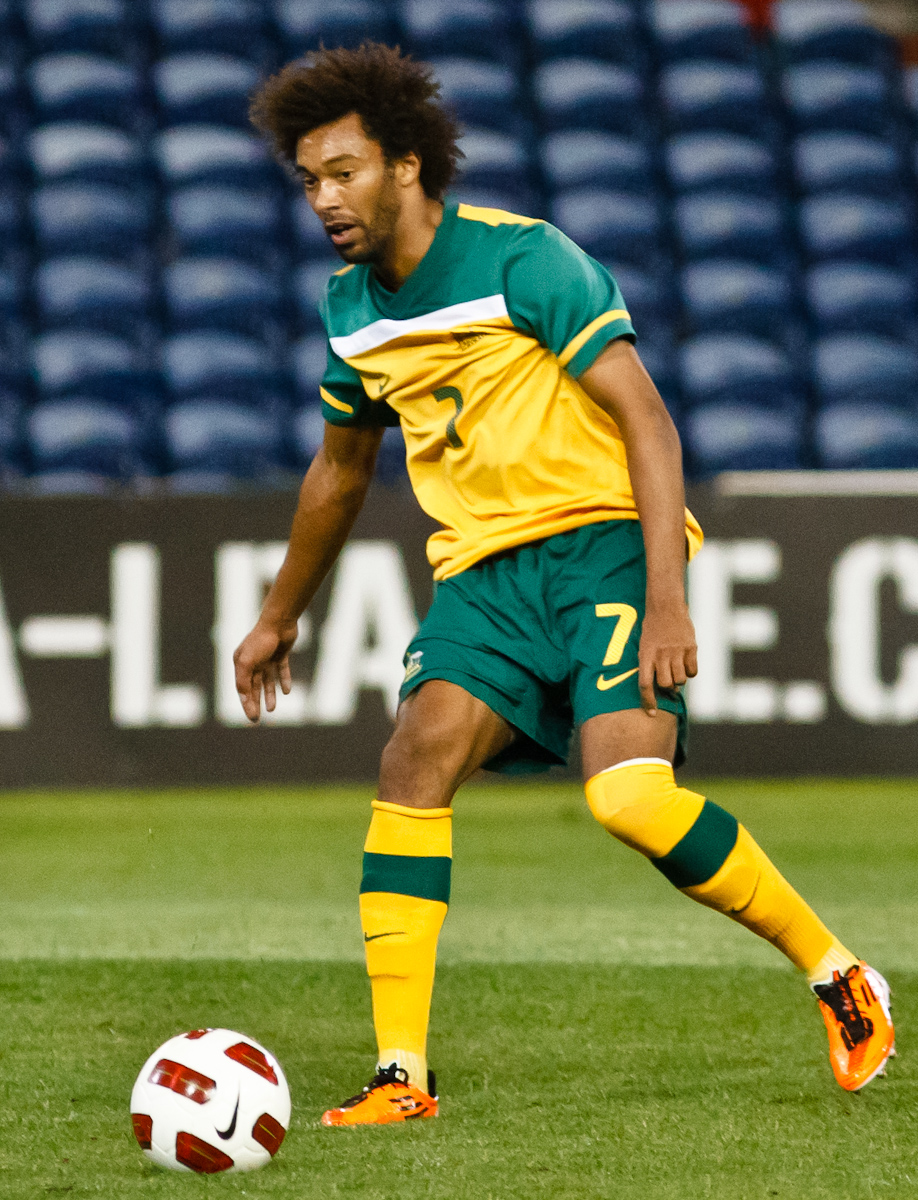
Cernak playing for the Australia national under-23 association football team in 2011

Cernak has represented Australia at U-20 and U-23 level. He has 19 caps and five goals at U-20 level and he currently has 7 caps and zero goals at U-23 level. He has won the Weifang Cup U-18 competition for Australia in 2007 and the International Cor Groenewegen Tournament at U-20 level in 2009.

== Personal life ==
Cernak was born in Galiwin'ku, Northern Territory. His father is Ugandan, and his mother is European Australian with a Scottish-Czech-American family background.

== Career statistics ==
As of 16 September 2020

Club	Season	League			Cup		Continental		Total	
Club	Season	Division	Apps	Goals	Apps	Goals	Apps	Goals	Apps	Goals
AIS	2007	Victorian Premier League	20	1	-	-	-	-	20	1
Brisbane Roar	2008–09	A-League	4	0	-	-	-	-	4	0
Brisbane Roar	2009–10	A-League	11	1	-	-	-	-	11	1
Brisbane Roar	Roar total		15	1	0	0	0	0	15	1
North Queensland Fury	2010–11	A-League	14	1	-	-	-	-	14	1
Melbourne Victory	2010–11	A-League	0	0	-	-	4	0	4	0
Melbourne Victory	2011–12	A-League	17	2	-	-	-	-	17	2
Melbourne Victory	2012–13	A-League	4	0	-	-	-	-	4	0
Melbourne Victory	Victory total		21	2	0	0	4	0	25	2
Wellington Phoenix	2012–13	A-League	6	0	-	-	-	-	6	0
Perth Glory	2013–14	A-League	4	0	-	-	-	-	4	0
Central Coast Mariners	2013–14	A-League	1	0	-	-	2	0	3	0
Central Coast Mariners	2014–15	A-League	18	1	4	1	1	0	23	2
Central Coast Mariners	Mariners total		19	1	4	1	3	0	18	2
SuperSport United	2015–16	Premier Soccer League	7	0	1	0	-	-	8	0
Sisaket	2017	Thai League T1	14	1	-	-	-	-	14	1
Home United	2018	Singapore Premier League	5	0	5	1	4	1	14	2
Home United	2019	Singapore Premier League	4	0	2	0	4	0	10	0
Home United	Total		9	0	7	0	8	1	24	2
Phrae United	2020	Thai League 2	2	0	-	-	-	-	2	0
Olympic FC	2021	National Premier Leagues	24	1	0	0	0	0	0	0
Total			155	8	12	2	15	1	182	11
