= Matt Simon =

Australian soccer player (born 1986)

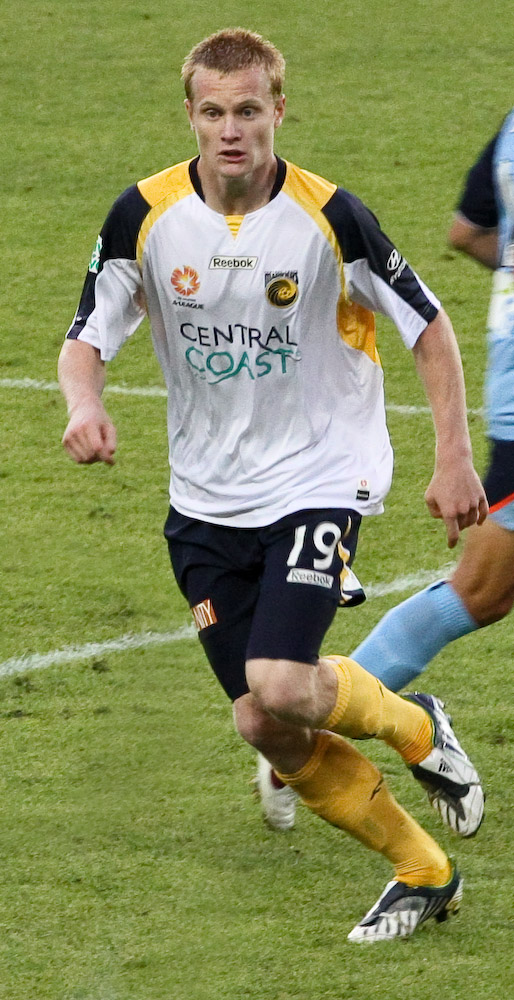
- Simon with Central Coast Mariners in 2008

Personal information
- Full name: Matthew Blake Simon
- Date of birth: 22 January 1986 (age 40)
- Place of birth: Sydney, Australia
- Height: 1.88 m (6 ft 2 in)
- Position: Forward

Youth career
- Wyoming
- East Gosford

Senior career*
Years	Team	Apps	(Gls)
2005–2006	Central Coast Lightning	35	(8)
2006–2012	Central Coast Mariners	114	(36)
2012–2013	Jeonnam Dragons	6	(0)
2013–2015	Central Coast Mariners	33	(5)
2015–2018	Sydney FC	67	(5)
2018–2022	Central Coast Mariners	70	(20)
Total		325	(74)

International career
2008	Australia U-23	10	(5)
2009	Australia	2	(0)
- * Club domestic league appearances and goals

Matthew Blake Simon (born 22 January 1986) is an Australian former soccer player who played as a striker. He is best known for playing for Central Coast Mariners.

Simon attended St Edward's College, East Gosford, where he was influenced to play soccer. He started his senior career with Central Coast Lightning before joining Central Coast Mariners in 2006. In 2012, Simon signed with K-League club Chunnam Dragons, however, his opportunities at the club were limited by persistent injuries. In 2013, Simon rejoined the Mariners. He moved to Sydney FC after being released by the Mariners in 2015, before again returning to the Mariners in 2018. Simon remains the Mariners' all-time leading goal scorer, as well as a 7-time Mariners’ Golden Boot winner, record holder for the most substitute appearances in Australian league history, and scorer of the latest goal recorded in an A-League regular season match.

Simon has made two appearances for the Australia national team. He also appeared for Australia U23 at the 2008 Summer Olympics.

== Club career ==
=== Central Coast Mariners ===
He was added to the Mariners' squad in the week leading up to their 2006 Pre-Season Cup play-off against Newcastle Jets. Simon was then brought back to the squad after Nik Mrdja suffered a heel injury before the round 19 clash against Newcastle. He starred for the Central Coast Lightning during their 2006 NSW Winter Super League campaign. Simon had a solid 07–08 season with the Mariners despite not scoring any goals. In the first league game for the 08–09 season Simon immediately broke his duck and scored off a header that would prove to be the start of his wonderful season.

After a successful 08–09 season, in January 2009, he was offered a 2-year contract by Major League Soccer club Colorado Rapids but turned it down citing his preference to remain in Australia with the possibility of playing in Europe in the future. Later in the year, he extended his contract with Central Coast Mariners, staying with the club until 2012.

=== Move to South Korea ===
On 30 December 2011 it was announced that he had signed a three-year contract worth $400,000 per year to play for K-League side Jeonnam Dragons. It was later announced that Jeonnam Dragons paid a transfer fee of $170,000 to acquire the player.

=== Return to Central Coast Mariners ===
On 16 May 2013 it was announced that he had re-signed with the Mariners.

=== Sydney FC ===
On 3 August 2015 it was announced that Matt Simon had signed with Sydney FC, reuniting with his former coach Graham Arnold after he penned a one-year deal with the club. Arnold said the capture of Simon would add a new dimension to his squad. In Round 4 of the 2015–16 A-League, Simon scored twice as they beat his old club 3–1, after coming on as a substitute.

On 20 July 2016, Simon signed a one-year extension to his contract.

Despite coming off the bench for all of his 25 league games of the 2016–2017 season, Simon signed a one-year contract extension with the Sky Blue until the end of the 2017–2018 season. Simon was part of the title winning squad, winning the double in 2016–17.

On 24 March 2018, Simon came off the bench for Sydney FC in a match against his former club, and scored the winning goal in 90+3, which ultimately would set Sydney FC up to winning the A-League Premiership for the 2017–2018 season.

=== Second return to Central Coast Mariners ===
On 10 May 2018, Simon left Sydney FC and signed once again with the Central Coast Mariners, on a two-year contract. On 26 October 2018, he was announced as the Mariners new club captain.

On 3 October 2022, Simon announced his retirement from football, following a neck injury sustained in the 2021 FFA Cup, which had ruled him out of the entire 2021–22 A-League Men season.

== International career ==
Simon played frequently for Australia under-23 (the Olyroos) in 2008. In May of that year he scored a hat-trick for the side in a 3–1 win over Republic of Ireland in Malaysia. Simon was originally named as an alternate player for the Olyroos at the 2008 Olympic Games in China. However, when Archie Thompson was injured mid-tournament, Simon was added to the playing squad. He played as a second-half substitute in the team's final match, a loss to Ivory Coast.

In May 2008, following strong form for the Olyroos, Simon was called up by Pim Verbeek to the Australian senior side for the first time for a 2010 World Cup qualifier against Iraq. He eventually made his Socceroos debut in January 2009 in a 2011 Asian Cup qualifier against Indonesia in Jakarta, in an Australian team of primarily A-League players. The game finished as a scoreless draw, although Simon did have a goal ruled out for offside. He made a second appearance for Australia in the same competition five weeks later against Kuwait. In what was Simon's first and only start for the side, the Socceroos lost 1–0 in Canberra.

== Professional career statistics ==
Appearances and goals by club, season and competition
Club	Season	League			Cup		Continental		Total	
Club	Season	Division	Apps	Goals	Apps	Goals	Apps	Goals	Apps	Goals
Central Coast Mariners
Central Coast Mariners	2006–07	A-League	3	0	1	0	0	0	4	0
Central Coast Mariners	2007–08	A-League	20	0	1	1	0	0	21	1
Central Coast Mariners	2008–09	A-League	21	11	0	0	4	2	25	13
Central Coast Mariners	2009–10	A-League	25	7	0	0	0	0	25	7
Central Coast Mariners	2010–11	A-League	31	11	0	0	0	0	31	11
Central Coast Mariners	2011–12	A-League	14	7	0	0	0	0	14	7
Central Coast Mariners	Total		114	36	2	1	4	2	120	39
Jeonnam Dragons	2012	K-League	6	0	1	0	0	0	7	0
Jeonnam Dragons	2013	K-League	0	0	0	0	0	0	0	0
Jeonnam Dragons	Total		6	0	1	0	0	0	7	0
Central Coast Mariners	2013–14	A-League	26	2	0	0	4	0	30	2
Central Coast Mariners	2014–15	A-League	11	3	1	1	0	0	12	4
Central Coast Mariners	Total		37	5	1	1	4	0	42	6
Sydney FC	2015–16	A-League	20	3	2	0	5	0	27	3
Sydney FC	2016–17	A-League	25	0	4	2	0	0	29	2
Sydney FC	2017–18	A-League	22	2	5	2	4	1	31	5
Sydney FC	Total		67	5	11	4	9	1	87	10
Central Coast Mariners	2018–19	A-League	22	7	1	0	—		23	7
Central Coast Mariners	2019–20	A-League	21	3	4	1	—		25	4
Central Coast Mariners	2020–21	A-League	27	10	—		—		27	10
Central Coast Mariners	2021–22	A-League	0	0	1	0	—		1	0
Central Coast Mariners	Total		70	20	6	1	—		76	21
Career total			294	66	21	7	17	3	331	76

== Honours ==
Central Coast Mariners

- A-League Premiership: 2007–08

Sydney FC

- A-League Premiership: 2016–17, 2017–18
- A-League Championship: 2016–17
- FFA Cup: 2017

Individual

- Mariners Medal (Player of the Year): 2008–09
- PFA A-League Team of the Season: 2020–21
- Number 19 retired by Central Coast Mariners: 2022

Records

- Top goalscorer in Central Coast Mariners history: 59 goals

== See also ==
- List of Central Coast Mariners FC players
- List of foreign K League 1 players
- List of retired numbers in association football
