= All Saints Catholic College, Liverpool =

- College crest

Location
- 43 Bigge Street, Liverpool, south-western Sydney, New South Wales; Australia; 33°55′6″S 150°55′40″E

Information
- Former name: All Saints Catholic Boys' College; All Saints Catholic Girls' College; Patrician Brothers College
- School type: Independent co-educational secondary day school
- Motto: Faith and Integrity
- Denomination: Roman Catholic
- Established: 1954; 72 years ago (as Liverpool Catholic School in 1834, in 1878 The Sisters of Charity were invited to continue their work in the school, Patrician Brothers College); 1997; 29 years ago (as All Saints Catholic Boys' and Girls' Colleges); 2016; 10 years ago (All Saints Catholic College)
- Founder: Ignatius Barrett
- Principal: John Kennedy
- Teaching staff: 60
- Grades: 7–10
- Enrolment: c. 600
- Website: ascc.syd.catholic.edu.au

All Saints Catholic College, Liverpool is an independent Roman Catholic co-educational secondary day school located in the south-western Sydney suburb of Liverpool, in New South Wales, Australia. The college was created in 2016 when the All Saints Catholic Boys' College and the All Saints Catholic Girls College were merged. It provides religious and general education for students from Year 7 to Year 10. The boys' school was originally called Patrician Brothers College, Liverpool. One of the feeder schools in the All Saints Catholic Primary School, located adjacent to the College. Some students progress to the All Saints Catholic Senior College, located in the adjacent suburb of Casula.

The college caters for students in the parishes of Liverpool, Moorebank, Holsworthy and Lurnea. The school was founded by Brother Ignatius Barrett in 1954.

== History ==
The college was founded in 1954 by Brother Ignatius Barrett as Patrician Brothers College, Liverpool. The school originally taught out of a partition-type shelter until the first buildings were constructed in 1955. The college continued to expand well into the 1970s. Upgrades to the administration and staff areas also took place in the 1990s. The name was officially changed to All Saints Catholic College in 1997. The logo, school colours and uniforms were changed as a result. In 2010, a new science block, funded by the Federal Government's Building Education Revolution Programme, was completed. Prior to its 2016 merger, the college comprised two single-sex colleges, running from years 7 through 10. In 2020, the school merged with All Saints Catholic Senior College in Casula and All Saints Catholic Primary School to form the first K-12 school in the archdiocese of Sydney. They adopted the motto 'Inspired by Christ', as well as the K-12 motto 'One school, dual campus, one community'

== School structure and The Newman Program ==
All Saints Catholic College supports the Newman Gifted Education program for years 7-10. Students hoping to be in the Newman program undertake a selective exam in Year 6. Students can also join the Newman program later on from years 8–10 with outstanding grades. The Newman class is co-educational, meaning students in the Newman classes do not have any single-sex classes through high-school, different from other students.

Students in the Newman program are also included in a variety of special projects throughout the year such as The Newman Symposium. All teachers must complete a gifted education course before teaching the Newman class. Students in the Newman class are taught differently from other classes in order to fully reach the capabilities of gifted students. A spot in the Newman class is highly sought after for students and students should maintain high grades to secure their spot in the class.

The playground and all other areas of the school are shared by both female and male students with a Charity side, focusing on more passive activities during break times and a Patrician side, focusing on more active activities. The Charity side is known for being more popular to the Year Seven students, with many younger students spending their time on the Charity side. The Patrician side is well known for being the "sporty" area with many different options for students to exercise and play sports during break times. The Patrician Side is more popular to Year 8 students, with Year 9 and Year 10 students preferring to spend break times at the various courtyards and seating areas.

== Sports ==
The college takes part in the Metropolitan Catholic Schools competition (MCS) for male students, with the college taking place in Sydney Catholic Colleges Sports Association for girls representative Sport (SCC). Several colleges take part in this competition including Patrician Brothers, Fairfield and Blacktown and Holy Cross Ryde. All Saints students also participate in recreational sports such as ice skating, indoor rock climbing, ten-pin bowling, laser tag, golf, squash, tennis, table tennis, indoor soccer, indoor cricket, and indoor basketball, which are both in-school and out-of-school sports. As of 2020, All Saints competes in the MISA competition (Macarthur Independent Schools Association)

== Recent developments ==
Recently the college undertook a refurbishment program to improve the school's facilities. This refurbishment was completed in 2014, which included general learning areas, TAS facilities, gym, library, synthetic surfaced turfed area, performing arts centre, and maths activity centre. New redevelopments, including a new administration block, staff study, and cafeteria are also planned.

== Notable alumni ==
- Anthony Minichiello, rugby league player
- Mitchell Duke, soccer player

== See also ==
- List of Catholic schools in New South Wales
- Catholic education in Australia
