= John Hutchinson (association footballer) =

Maltese football player and manager (born 1979)

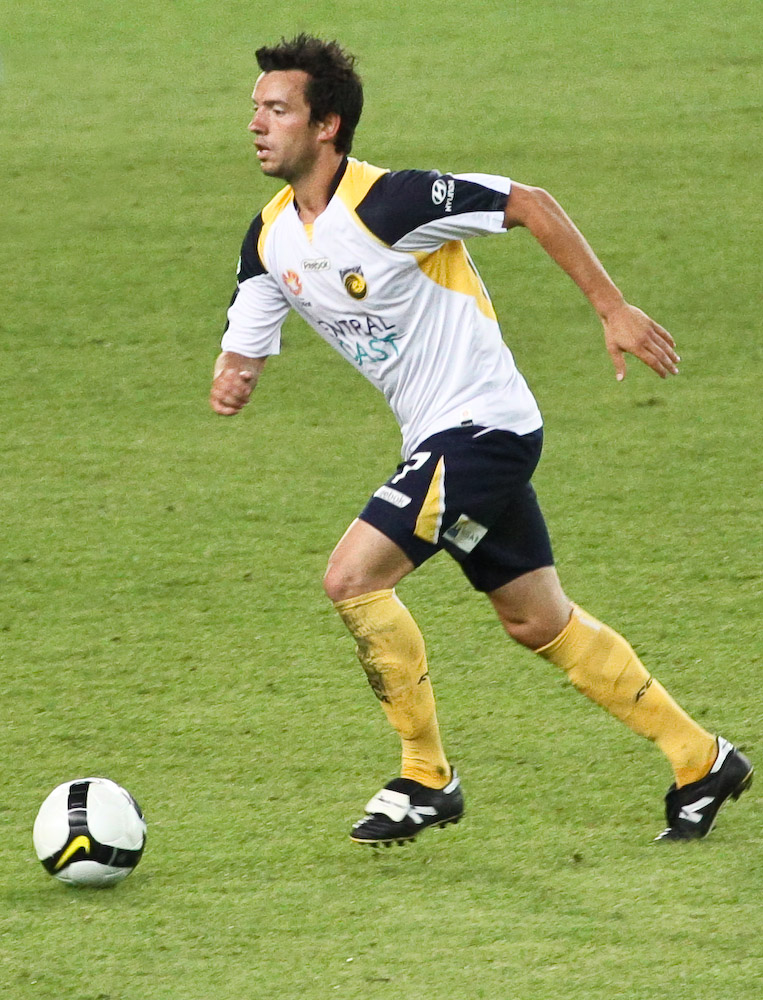
- Hutchinson with Central Coast Mariners in 2010

Personal information
- Full name: John Paul Hutchinson
- Date of birth: 29 December 1979 (age 46)
- Place of birth: Morwell, Australia
- Height: 1.79 m (5 ft 10 in)
- Position: Central midfielder

Youth career
- 1993–1996: Morwell Pegasus

Senior career*
Years	Team	Apps	(Gls)
1996–2001	Gippsland Falcons	89	(7)
2001–2004	Northern Spirit	77	(12)
2004–2005	Manly United	25	(4)
2005–2015	Central Coast Mariners	228	(18)
2011	→ Chengdu Blades (loan)	14	(3)
Total		433	(44)

International career
2009–2011	Malta	11	(0)

Managerial career
- 2018–2019: Seattle Sounders 2
- 2021–2022: El Paso Locomotive
- 2024: Yokohama F. Marinos (caretaker)
- 2024–2025: Júbilo Iwata
- 2026–: Central Coast Mariners
- * Club domestic league appearances and goals

John Paul Hutchinson (born 29 December 1979) is a football manager and former player who is the head coach of the Central Coast Mariners, where he also previously played 228 league matches for and captained. He also played for Gippsland Falcons, Northern Spirit, Manly United, and Chengdu Blades, predominately playing as a central midfielder. Born in Australia, he represented the Malta national team.

Hutchinson was born in Morwell, Victoria and made his senior debut for the Falcons in the National Soccer League in 1997. Hutchinson went on to play for Northern Spirit and Manly United before joining Central Coast Mariners in 2005. Hutchinson is the all-time most-capped Mariners player. He also spent time on loan at Chinese club Chengdu Blades.

Hutchinson won 11 caps with Malta.

== Early life ==
Hutchinson was born in Morwell, and played youth football from age three for Morwell Pegasus, going on to play for the side in the Latrobe Valley Soccer League. He has Maltese ancestry through his mother.

== Club career ==
=== Gippsland Falcons ===
Hutchinson is one of the most highly lauded prospects to emerge from the Gippsland Falcons youth setup. Hutchinson signed with the Falcons as a youth by coach Harry Bingham. He made his National Soccer League debut for the club in February 1997, coming on as a substitute in a loss to Marconi-Fairfield. On 2 January 2000 he scored his first league goal, the opener in a 1–1 draw with Adelaide Force.

Hutchinson played 89 NSL matches for the Falcons and made over 100 senior appearances for his hometown club.

Despite the limited success of the final seasons of the Falcons, who were subsequently renamed Eastern Pride, Hutchinson received positive reviews for his performances for the club at a young age.

=== Northern Spirit ===
In June 2001, Hutchinson moved to Sydney-based National Soccer League side Northern Spirit following the dissolution of Eastern Pride.

Hutchinson was one of several players unpaid during the financial decline of the Spirit, and eventually was left clubless when the club folded in 2004.

=== Manly United ===
Hutchinson next played for Manly United in the NSW Premier League, where he was club captain.

=== Central Coast Mariners ===
Hutchinson made his competitive debut for the Mariners in qualifying competition for the 2005 OFC Club Championship, coming on at half-time against Newcastle Jets in a match the Mariners eventually won in a penalty shootout. Hutchinson came on in the final minutes of the 2005 A-League Pre-Season Challenge Cup final against Perth Glory as the Mariners won their first ever piece of silverware in August 2005. He was also a last-minute substitute in his A-League debut, again a 1–0 win over Perth in what was the second-ever A-League match. His first Mariners goal came in a 5–1 loss to Sydney FC on 5 November 2005. Around this time, Hutchinson began to be used as a forward, a role which saw him score six goals from six games, including a brace against Newcastle Jets in the F3 derby. Hutchinson's season ended prematurely after picking up an injury in a match against Sydney FC.

Hutchinson came on in extra time in the 2006 A-League Pre-Season Challenge Cup final against Adelaide United and converted his penalty in the 5–4 loss in a penalty shoot-out. Hutchinson's only goal of the 2006–07 season was the Mariners' first in the 2006–07 A-League, the opening goal in a 1-all draw with Newcastle Jets.

After recovering from a knee injury, Hutchinson became a key player for the Central Coast Mariners, playing in central midfield with the likes of Mile Jedinak and Tom Pondeljak in Version 3 of the A-League. This form led him to be named one of the most influential players in the A-League. On 28 October 2007, Hutchinson scored a double against Sydney FC, with two strikes off either foot from outside the box, but was unable to prevent the Mariners suffering a 3–2 loss. The Mariners won the 2007–08 A-League Premiership, and came within one game of the Championship, losing to the Jets in the 2008 A-League Grand Final, with Hutchinson playing a full match.

Hutchinson played his 100th A-League match in August 2009 - a 1–1 draw against Newcastle Jets - becoming just the second Mariner to achieve this milestone after Alex Wilkinson.

In 2011, Hutchinson was loaned to Chinese Super League side Chengdu Blades, under former Mariners coach Lawrie McKinna and alongside fellow Mariner Adam Kwasnik. Hutchinson scored his first goal for the side in a 2-all draw with Changchun Yatai on 31 July 2011, having made his debut three weeks prior in a loss to Shandong Luneng.

Hutchinson came on as a substitute for Mustafa Amini in the 2011 A-League Grand Final and scored a penalty in the shoot-out but it was not enough as the Mariners lost 4–2.

Hutchinson was part of the Mariners side which won the 2011–12 A-League Premiership.

Hutchinson has most recently played an important role in the strong A-League performance of the Central Coast Mariners over recent years and was named club captain after long-serving captain Alex Wilkinson departed the club before the 2012–2013 season. He captained the side to its first ever A-League Championship, beating Western Sydney in the 2013 A-League Grand Final.

Hutchinson played his 200th A-League match on 5 April 2014 - a loss away to Perth.

The 2014–15 season is Hutchinson's tenth with the Mariners. In November 2014, Hutchinson scored a goal in the 94th minute from outside the box to secure a 2-all draw for the Mariners with Melbourne City, breaking a run of four consecutive losses. Hutchinson concluded his 10-year professional career with a 3–1 loss to Melbourne Victory in the final round of the 2014/15 A-League season, capping of his 226th league appearance for the Central Coast. A testimonial match was held to conclude John's career on 23 May, attracting a crowd of over two thousand as to watch "Hutch's XI" versus the Mariners. The match yielded 17 goals, with "Hutch's XI" netting a dozen of those to win the match 12–5.

He is currently the most capped Central Coast Mariners player, with over 200 appearances for the Gosford side.

== International career ==
=== Australia ===
Following a strong 2007–08 A-League season, Hutchinson was called up to a Australia training squad for A-League players by Pim Verbeek in early 2008. He appeared for the side in a training match against the Australia under-23 side, coming on as a substitute in a 2–1 loss.

=== Malta ===
Due to his Maltese descent, he earned a call-up by Malta coach Dušan Fitzel, and he made his international debut for the Malta in a friendly against the Czech Republic, where he was employed in centre midfield. On 10 June 2009, Hutchinson played his first competitive match for Malta in the 2010 World Cup qualifier loss to Sweden at the Ullevi Stadium in Gothenburg. Hutchinson's best result with the side came in a 1–1 draw at home against Georgia. Hutchinson's opportunities to play at international level were at times limited by club commitments and the considerable travel involved in flying between Australia and Europe for games. Hutchinson made eleven appearances for Malta.

== Coaching career ==
From 2015 to 2016, Hutchinson served as assistant coach at the Mariners, before parting ways in August 2016. On 1 March 2017, Hutchinson was appointed assistant coach for Seattle Sounders FC 2, the reserve team of Major League Soccer's Seattle Sounders FC. He became head coach of the team on 30 January 2018 to replace Ezra Hendrickson. On 23 January 2019, the Sounders announced that Hutchinson would be departing the club to return to coach in Australia. On the same day, he was announced as the assistant manager of Western United.

Hutchinson was appointed head coach and technical director of El Paso Locomotive FC on 9 December 2021. On 15 November 2022, Hutchinson left El Paso to return home to Australia.

He spent the 2023 season as assistant at Yokohama FC, and joined Harry Kewell's staff as head coach of Yokohama F. Marinos for 2024. Hutchinson became interim head coach on 15 July 2024 after Kewell's contract was released by the club. John was appointed as manager of Júbilo Iwata on 14 December 2024.

Hutchinson re-joined his former club, the Central Coast Mariners, as head coach ahead of the 2026-27 season.

== Career statistics ==
=== Club ===
Appearances and goals by club, season and competition
Club	Season	League			Cup		Continental		Total	
Club	Season	Division	Apps	Goals	Apps	Goals	Apps	Goals	Apps	Goals
Eastern Pride	1996–97	National Soccer League	4	0	0	0	0	0	4	0
Eastern Pride	1997–98	National Soccer League	9	0	3	0	0	0	12	0
Eastern Pride	1998–99	National Soccer League	21	0	4	0	0	0	25	0
Eastern Pride	1999–2000	National Soccer League	31	2	4	0	0	0	35	2
Eastern Pride	2000–01	National Soccer League	24	5	4	0	0	0	28	5
Eastern Pride	Total		89	7	15	0	0	0	104	7
Northern Spirit	2001–02	National Soccer League	21	3	0	0	0	0	21	3
Northern Spirit	2002–03	National Soccer League	33	7	0	0	0	0	33	7
Northern Spirit	2003–04	National Soccer League	23	2	0	0	0	0	23	2
Northern Spirit	Total		77	12	0	0	0	0	77	12
Manly United	2004	NSW Super League	25	4	0	0	0	0	25	4
Central Coast Mariners	2005–06	A-League	17	6	4	0	0	0	21	6
Central Coast Mariners	2006–07	A-League	16	1	1	0	0	0	17	1
Central Coast Mariners	2007–08	A-League	22	3	4	0	0	0	26	3
Central Coast Mariners	2008–09	A-League	22	2	3	0	6	0	31	2
Central Coast Mariners	2009–10	A-League	23	3	0	0	0	0	23	3
Central Coast Mariners	2010–11	A-League	26	1	0	0	0	0	26	1
Central Coast Mariners	2011–12	A-League	22	0	0	0	6	0	28	0
Central Coast Mariners	2012–13	A-League	27	1	0	0	6	0	33	1
Central Coast Mariners	2013–14	A-League	27	0	0	0	6	0	33	0
Central Coast Mariners	2014–15	A-League	26	1	4	0	0	0	30	1
Central Coast Mariners	Total		228	18	16	0	24	0	268	18
Chengdu Blades (loan)	2011	Chinese Super League	14	3	0	0	0	0	14	3
Total			433	44	16	0	24	0	473	44

=== International ===
Appearances and goals by national team and year
National team	Year	Apps	Goals
Malta	2009	4	0
Malta	2010	1	0
Malta	2011	6	0
Total		11	0

=== Managerial statistics ===
As of 13 September 2025

Managerial record by team and tenure
Team	Nat.	From	To	Record								Ref.
Team	Nat.	From	To	P	W	D	L	GF	GA	GD	Win %	Ref.
Seattle Sounders FC 2	(United States)	30 January 2018	24 January 2019	34	6	7	21	40	71	−31	17.65	
El Paso Locomotive FC	(United States)	9 December 2021	15 November 2022	35	13	7	15	57	56	+1	37.14	
Yokohama F. Marinos (interim)	(Japan)	16 July 2024	8 December 2024	28	15	3	10	66	49	+17	53.57	
Júbilo Iwata	(Japan)	14 December 2024	present	34	17	6	11	44	36	+8	50.00	
Total				131	51	23	57	207	212	−5	38.93	

== Honours ==
Manly United

- NSW Super League: 2004

Central Coast Mariners

- A-League Championship: 2012–13
- A-League Premiership: 2006–07, 2011–12
- A-League Pre-Season Challenge Cup: 2005

Records

- Most appearances for Central Coast Mariners: 271 games
