= Josh Rose =

Australian soccer player (born 1981)

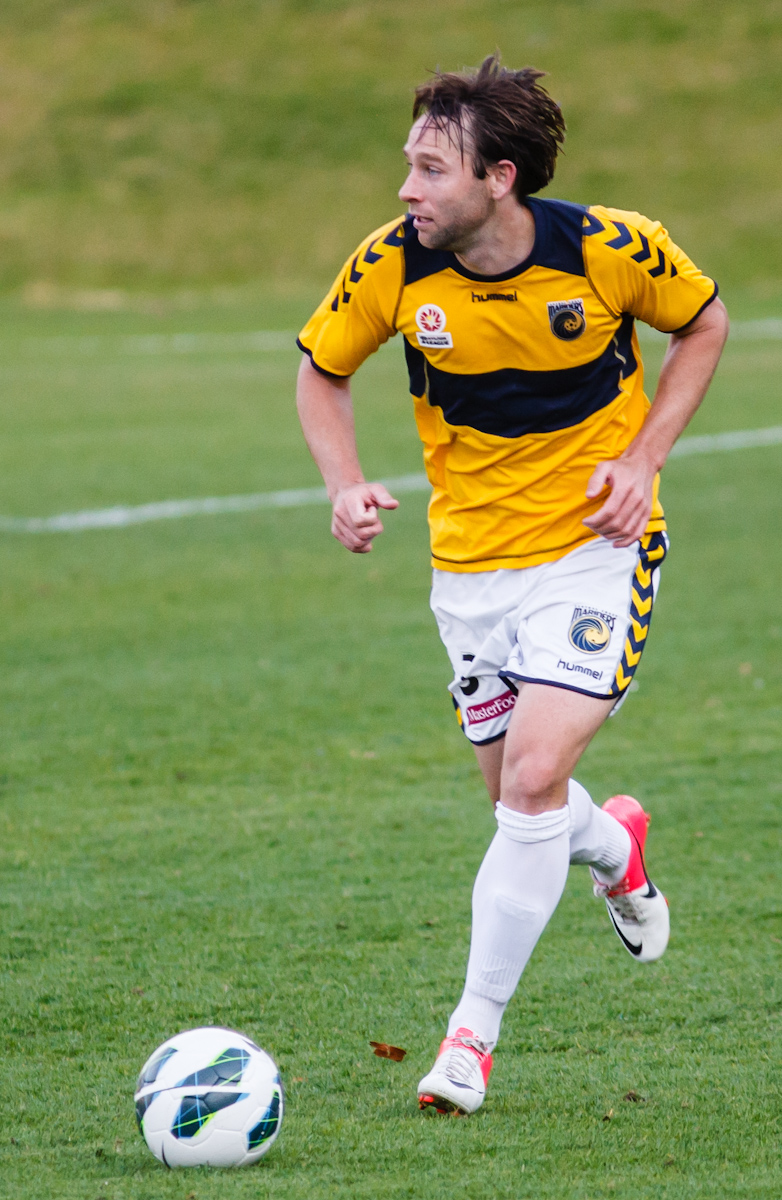
- Rose playing for Central Coast Mariners in 2012

Personal information
- Full name: Joshua Liam Rose
- Date of birth: 16 December 1981 (age 44)
- Place of birth: Rockhampton, Queensland, Australia
- Height: 1.78 m (5 ft 10 in)
- Position: Left back

Team information
- Current team: Central Coast Mariners (assistant coach)

Youth career
- 2000–2001: Wynnum Wolves

Senior career*
| Years | Team | Apps | (Gls) |
| 2001–2004 | Brisbane Strikers | 52 | (8) |
| 2005–2006 | New Zealand Knights | 12 | (1) |
| 2006–2009 | Universitatea Craiova | 113 | (9) |
| 2010–2016 | Central Coast Mariners | 165 | (8) |
| 2016–2017 | Melbourne City | 23 | (0) |
| 2017–2018 | Central Coast Mariners | 18 | (0) |
| 2018–2022 | Edgeworth | 92 | (27) |

Managerial career
- 2024–: Central Coast Mariners (assistant)
- * Club domestic league appearances and goals as of 2 April 2022

Joshua Liam "Josh" Rose (born 16 December 1981) is a former Australian professional soccer player who played as a left back. Rose is most synonymous with the Central Coast Mariners, where he played most of his career and where he is currently an assistant coach. He previously featured in the A-League for New Zealand Knights, and Melbourne City, as well as in the National Soccer League for Brisbane Strikers and in the Liga I with Universitatea Craiova. He is currently work with the Central Coast Mariners as assistant coach.

== Club career ==
=== Universitatea Craiova ===
Before joining the Romanian club Universitatea Craiova he played for the New Zealand Knights in the A-League and the Brisbane Strikers in the National Soccer League.

In Romania, Rose played for three years, and was really appreciated by Stiinta's fans.

=== Central Coast Mariners ===
On 8 March 2010, he signed a two-year deal with A-League club Central Coast Mariners. This was Graham Arnold's first signing since becoming coach of the club. On Thursday 17 June He made his debut and scored for the team in a friendly against fellow Gosford club Central Coast Lightning in which the Mariners won 7–1. Rose had an outstanding first season with the club, helping it to a second-placed finish and a Grand Final appearance. Rose also won the prestigious Peter Turnbull medal for Mariners player of the season.

On 20 July 2013, Rose started for the A-League All Stars in the inaugural A-League All Stars Game against Manchester United, a match in which the A-League All Stars were thrashed 5–1, courtesy of goals from Danny Welbeck, Jesse Lingard and Robin van Persie. Rose was substituted off in the 64th minute of the match, and was replaced by Western Sydney Wanderers forward Mark Bridge.

=== Melbourne City ===
On 11 August 2016, Rose left Central Coast Mariners to join Melbourne City on a one-year contract.

On 1 May 2017, Melbourne City announced Rose's contract would not be renewed.

=== Return to Central Coast Mariners ===
On 3 July 2017, Rose returned to Central Coast Mariners, signing a one-year contract. On 6 April 2018, Rose announced his A-League retirement at the end of the season.

=== Edgeworth ===
On 2 May 2018, Rose joined National Premier Leagues Northern NSW side Edgeworth.

== Career statistics ==
As of match played 14 October 2017

Appearances and goals by club, season and competition
| Club | Season | League | | | Cup | | Continental | | Total | |
| Club | Season | Division | Apps | Goals | Apps | Goals | Apps | Goals | Apps | Goals |
|---|---|---|---|---|---|---|---|---|---|---|
| Brisbane Strikers | 2001–02 | National Soccer League | 5 | 1 | 0 | 0 | 0 | 0 | 5 | 1 |
| Brisbane Strikers | 2002–03 | National Soccer League | 21 | 1 | 0 | 0 | 0 | 0 | 21 | 1 |
| Brisbane Strikers | 2003–04 | National Soccer League | 26 | 6 | 0 | 0 | 0 | 0 | 26 | 6 |
| Brisbane Strikers | Strikers total | | 52 | 8 | 0 | 0 | 0 | 0 | 52 | 8 |
| New Zealand Knights | 2005–06 | A-League | 12 | 1 | 3 | 0 | 0 | 0 | 15 | 1 |
| New Zealand Knights | New Zealand Total | | 12 | 1 | 3 | 0 | 0 | 0 | 15 | 1 |
| Universitatea Craiova | 2006–07 | Liga I | 32 | 5 | 2 | 0 | 0 | 0 | 34 | 5 |
| Universitatea Craiova | 2007–08 | Liga I | 33 | 1 | 1 | 0 | 0 | 0 | 34 | 1 |
| Universitatea Craiova | 2008–09 | Liga I | 33 | 3 | 2 | 0 | 0 | 0 | 35 | 3 |
| Universitatea Craiova | 2009–10 | Liga I | 15 | 0 | 3 | 0 | 0 | 0 | 15 | 0 |
| Universitatea Craiova | Universitatea Craiova total | | 113 | 9 | 8 | 0 | 0 | 0 | 121 | 9 |
| Central Coast Mariners | 2010–11 | A-League | 31 | 3 | 0 | 0 | 0 | 0 | 31 | 3 |
| Central Coast Mariners | 2011–12 | A-League | 30 | 1 | 0 | 0 | 5 | 1 | 35 | 2 |
| Central Coast Mariners | 2012–13 | A-League | 28 | 1 | 0 | 0 | 6 | 0 | 34 | 1 |
| Central Coast Mariners | 2013–14 | A-League | 27 | 1 | 0 | 0 | 6 | 0 | 33 | 1 |
| Central Coast Mariners | 2014–15 | A-League | 26 | 2 | 3 | 1 | 1 | 0 | 30 | 3 |
| Central Coast Mariners | 2015–16 | A-League | 23 | 0 | 1 | 0 | 0 | 0 | 24 | 0 |
| Melbourne City | 2016–17 | A-League | 23 | 0 | 3 | 0 | 0 | 0 | 26 | 0 |
| Central Coast Mariners | 2017–18 | A-League | 2 | 0 | 1 | 0 | 0 | 0 | 3 | 0 |
| | A-League Total | | 190 | 8 | 8 | 1 | 1 | 0 | 199 | 9 |
| Edgeworth | 2018 | NPL NNSW | 17 | 3 | 0 | 0 | — | | 17 | 3 |
| Edgeworth | 2019 | NPL NNSW | 22 | 4 | - | - | — | | 22 | 4 |
| Edgeworth | 2020 | NPL NNSW | 14 | 3 | - | - | — | | 14 | 3 |
| Edgeworth | 2021 | NPL NNSW | 7 | 6 | - | - | — | | 7 | 6 |
| Edgeworth | 2022 | NPL NNSW | 20 | 5 | - | - | — | | 20 | 5 |
| Edgeworth | 2023 | NPL NNSW | 12 | 6 | - | - | — | | 12 | 6 |
| Edgeworth | Edgeworth Total | | 92 | 27 | - | - | — | | 92 | 27 |
| Career total | | | 459 | 53 | 19 | 1 | 18 | 1 | 496 | 55 |

== Honours ==
=== Club ===
Central Coast Mariners

- A-League Championship: 2012–13
- A-League Premiership: 2011–12

=== Individual ===
- Mariners Medal: 2010–11
- A-League PFA Team of the Season: 2010–11, 2011–12
- A-League All Star: 2013, 2014
