= Michael Neill =

Australian soccer player

Personal information
- Full name: Michael Neill
- Date of birth: 4 July 1994 (age 32)
- Place of birth: Sydney, Australia
- Height: 1.76 m (5 ft 9 in)
- Position: Left back

Youth career
- –2012: Sutherland Sharks
- 2012–2013: Central Coast Mariners

Senior career*
Years	Team	Apps	(Gls)
2013–2017	Central Coast Mariners	46	(1)
2017	Sydney United	7	(0)
2018–2020	Rockdale City Suns	44	(1)
2020	Newcastle Jets	0	(0)
2020–2021	Rockdale Ilinden	26	(4)
2022	Sutherland Sharks	15	(0)
2023	Sydney Olympic	26	(0)
2025-2026	Hurstville Zagreb	50	(12)
- * Club domestic league appearances and goals as of 12 September 2026

Michael Neill (born 4 July 1994) is a former Australian professional footballer who last played as a left back for Hurstville Zagreb in NPL NSW League One.

Neill was born in Sydney and played youth football with Sutherland Sharks and Central Coast Mariners Youth before making his professional debut with the Central Coast Mariners and Newcastle Jets in the A-League.

== Early life ==
Neill was born in Sydney.

== Club career ==
=== Youth ===
Neill played in the youth systems of English club Portsmouth and Sutherland Sharks before joining the Central Coast Mariners team in the National Youth League.

=== Central Coast Mariners ===
After joining the Mariners youth team for the 2012–13 National Youth League, Neill's performances earned him a two-year contract with the senior side. He missed most of the 2013–14 season with injury. In October 2014, Neill made his competitive debut for the Mariners, playing a full match in a 5–0 win over Palm Beach in the FFA Cup. He made his A-League debut for the club in a loss to Perth Glory in November 2014. Late in 2014, Neill suffered an injury which saw him ruled out for the remainder of the 2014–15 season. In February 2015 Neill signed an extension with the Mariners until mid-2017.

Neill netted his maiden A-League goal in a win over Wellington Phoenix on New Year's Eve in 2015.

=== Sydney United ===
Neill left Central Coast Mariners in June 2017, joining National Premier Leagues NSW side Sydney United.

=== Rockdale City Suns ===
Neill left Sydney United at the end of 2017 season, joining National Premier Leagues NSW side for Rockdale City Suns FC in 2018 NSW NPL season.

=== Newcastle Jets ===
In July 2020, Newcastle Jets announced that they had signed Neill for the remainder of the 2019–20 A-League season, following the season's resumption from delays caused by the COVID-19 pandemic in Australia.

== Career statistics ==
As of 26 June 2017

Club	Season	League			Cup		Continental		Total	
Club	Season	Division	Apps	Goals	Apps	Goals	Apps	Goals	Apps	Goals
Central Coast Mariners	2013–14	A-League	0	0	0	0	0	0	0	0
Central Coast Mariners	2014–15	A-League	8	0	1	0	0	0	9	0
Central Coast Mariners	2015–16	A-League	21	1	1	0	0	0	22	0
Central Coast Mariners	2016–17	A-League	17	0	1	0	0	0	18	0
Central Coast Mariners	Mariners total		46	1	3	0	0	0	49	1
Sydney United	2017	National Premier Leagues NSW	7	0	2	0	0	0	9	0
Sydney United	United 58 total		7	0	2	0	0	0	9	0
Rockdale City Suns
Rockdale City Suns	2018	National Premier Leagues NSW	22	1	2	0	0	0	24	1
Rockdale City Suns	2019	National Premier Leagues NSW	19	0	1	0	0	0	20	0
Rockdale City Suns	2020	National Premier Leagues NSW	3	0	0	0	0	0	3	0
Rockdale City Suns	Suns total		44	1	3	0	0	0	47	1
Newcastle Jets	2019–20	A-League	0	0	0	0	0	0	0	0
Career total			97	2	6	0	0	0	103	2

== See also ==
- List of Central Coast Mariners FC players
