= All Saints Catholic Senior College =

- All Saints Catholic Senior College crest

Location
- Leacocks Lane, Casula, south-western Sydney, New South Wales; Australia; 33°57.2′S 150°54.5′E

Information
- Type: Independent co-educational senior secondary day school
- Motto: Striving for Excellence
- Denomination: Roman Catholicism
- Patron saints: Óscar Romero (1917–1980); Mother Teresa of Calcutta (1910–1997)
- Founded: 1987; 39 years ago
- Status: Open
- Educational authority: New South Wales Department of Education
- Oversight: Roman Catholic Archdiocese of Sydney
- Principal: David Fetterplace
- Chaplain: Tom Stevens
- Staff: 11 (2014)
- Teaching staff: 49 (2014)
- Years: 11–12
- Enrolment: 544 (2014)
- Campus type: Suburban
- Colours: Light blue and grey
- Song: We Are All Saints
- Website: ascc.syd.catholic.edu.au

All Saints Catholic Senior College is an independent Roman Catholic co-educational senior secondary day school located in the south-western Sydney suburb of Casula, New South Wales, Australia. Founded in 1987, the College educates students in Year 11 and Year 12 and provides the final two years of education for the students from All Saints Catholic College and All Saints Catholic Primary School located in Casula, close to its high school counterpart in the heart of Liverpool. The College has a maximum enrolment of approximately 601 students.

== History ==
Prior to 1987, children of the Parish of All Saints, Liverpool could choose to receive a secondary Catholic education by attending Patrician Brothers' Boys High Liverpool and Saint Mary's Girls High Liverpool and receive the NSW School Certificate as their highest certification.

In 1984, an action group of parents, chaired by Ray McMahon, was established to raise support for the establishment of a Catholic senior secondary school in Liverpool. Such a development was already a priority of Liverpool Parish priest Father Roth Delaney and together they lobbied government and Catholic education office bearers while raising community support and funding for the school. Originally planned for Ashcroft, land negotiations lead to the final site location in Leacocks Lane, Casula.

In 1987, All Saints Catholic Senior High School, was established by the Roman Catholic Archdiocese of Sydney and classes began in temporary demountable classrooms on 2 February 1987 on the site of St Mary's High and Patrician Brothers' High, Liverpool. Following a rapid ten-week construction, the current Leacocks Lane campus was opened in 1988 with 380 students and 29 teaching staff. The College was officially blessed on Sunday 27 March 1988 by Archbishop Edward Clancy after which permanent building construction began.

== Other names ==
Later changes to the naming of its principal feeder schools, from Patrician Brothers Boys High Liverpool to All Saints Catholic Boys College and Saint Mary's Girls High Liverpool to All Saints Catholic Girls College saw the senior school adopt the new title of All Saints Catholic Senior College. More recently, amalgamation of the two junior campuses into a coeducational campus has led to the current trichotomy of All Saints K-12 education in Liverpool:

- All Saints Catholic Primary School (K–6)
- All Saints Catholic College (7–10)
- All Saints Catholic Senior College (11–12)

== College patrons, vision and mission ==
The Patron Saints of the college are:

- Óscar Romero (1917–1980)
- Saint Teresa of Calcutta (1910–1997)

== See also ==
- List of Catholic schools in New South Wales
