= Jacob Esposito =

Australian professional footballer

Personal information
- Full name: Jacob Esposito
- Date of birth: 13 May 1995 (age 31)
- Place of birth: Australia
- Position: Right back

Team information
- Current team: Macarthur Rams
- Number: 30

Youth career
- Rockdale City
- 2013: Newcastle Jets
- 2014: Sydney United

Senior career*
Years	Team	Apps	(Gls)
2014	Newcastle Jets NPL	6	(0)
2014	Sydney United	4	(0)
2015	Hakoah Sydney City East	23	(2)
2015–2016	Livingston	1	(0)
2016	Airdrieonians	6	(0)
2018	PS Kemi	21	(0)
2019	Mt Druitt Rangers	10	(2)
2020	Sydney United	1	(0)
2021–2022	Hakoah Sydney City East	34	(0)
2023	Mt Druitt Rangers	26	(1)
2024–	Macarthur Rams	40	(2)
- * Club domestic league appearances and goals as of 19 February 2026 ‡ National team caps and goals as of 5 April 2018

Jacob Esposito (born 13 May 1995), is an Australian professional footballer who plays as a right back for Macarthur Rams in NSW League One.

== Playing career ==
Esposito signed for Scottish side Livignston in December 2015.

The following season, he signed for Airdrieonians but was released at the end of the 2015-16 season.
