= Hayden Morton =

Australian soccer player (born 1994)

Personal information
- Full name: Hayden Matthew Morton
- Date of birth: 2 March 1994 (age 32)
- Place of birth: Australia
- Height: 1.87 m (6 ft 2 in)
- Position: Defender

Youth career
- 2010: NSWIS
- 2011–2012: Central Coast Mariners

Senior career*
Years	Team	Apps	(Gls)
2011	Sutherland Sharks	20	(0)
2012–2015	Central Coast Mariners	5	(0)
2012	→ Sutherland Sharks (loan)	17	(0)
2015–2016	Blacktown Spartans	32	(0)
2017	Wollongong Wolves	19	(0)
2018	Sutherland Sharks	7	(0)
2018	Wollongong United	11	(2)
2019	St George City	20	(0)
2020	Wollongong United	0	(0)

International career^{‡}
2009–2010	Australia U-17	13	(2)
2012	Australia U-20	6	(0)
- * Club domestic league appearances and goals as of 26 September 2019 ‡ National team caps and goals as of 21 May 2013

Hayden Matthew Morton (born 2 March 1994) is an Australian professional football (soccer) player who plays as a defender for Sutherland Sharks in the National Premier Leagues.

Morton played youth football with the Mariners before making his professional debut for the club in 2012. He has also played for Sutherlands Sharks.

Morton has appeared for the Australia U17 and U20 teams.

== Playing career ==
=== Club ===
Morton made his debut for the Central Coast Mariners in a one goal defeat against Sydney FC late in 2012. Early in 2013 he signed a two year professional contract with the Mariners, keeping him at the club until 2015. He made a second Mariners appearance in March 2013 as a substitute in a 2-1 win over Melbourne Heart. He made his third competitive appearance for the Mariners starting in a 2013 AFC Champions League loss to Guizhou Renhe.

Morton's next Mariners appearance was a win in the 2014 FFA Cup quarter-finals over Palm Beach.

Morton enjoyed a run of first-team appearances in early 2015, with regular right-backs Jacob Poscoliero injured and Storm Roux on international duty with New Zealand.

=== International ===
Morton was first called into the Young Socceroos squad for the AFF U-19 Youth Championship. He went on to play for the side at the 2012 AFC U-19 Championship, reaching the semi-finals and so qualifying for the 2013 FIFA U-20 World Cup.

== Honours ==
=== Club ===
Sutherland Sharks

- Waratah Cup: 2012

Central Coast Mariners

- A-League Championship: 2012-13
