= Tom Slater (soccer) =

Australian footballer (born 1996)

Personal information
- Date of birth: 26 August 1996 (age 30)
- Place of birth: Lens, France
- Height: 1.75 m (5 ft 9 in)
- Position: Left wing

Youth career
- 2012–2013: Sydney FC
- 2013–2016: Central Coast Mariners
- 2016: Sydney FC
- 2017: North Shore Mariners

Senior career*
Years	Team	Apps	(Gls)
2013–2015	Central Coast Mariners	1	(0)
2015	St George	9	(0)
2016	Sydney FC NPL	7	(0)
- * Club domestic league appearances and goals as of 21 February 2014 ‡ National team caps and goals as of 21 February 2014

Tom Slater is an Australian football (soccer) player who plays as a left winger for North Shore Mariners in the National Premier Leagues NSW 2.

Slater was born in Lens and played youth football with Sydney FC before starting his professional career with Central Coast Mariners. He returned to Sydney FC in 2016.

== Early life ==
Slater was born in Lens. He is the son of former Socceroo Robbie Slater.

== Playing career ==
=== Club ===
In 2013, Slater signed a three-year deal with Central Coast Mariners. Slater made his professional debut for the Mariners in February 2014, coming on as a substitute in a loss to Wellington Phoenix. Slater left the Mariners by mutual agreement in May 2015.
