= Dejan Pandurevic =

Australian soccer player

Personal information
- Full name: Dejan Pandurevic
- Date of birth: 16 January 1997 (age 29)
- Place of birth: Dee Why, Australia
- Position: Attacking midfielder

Team information
- Current team: Manly United
- Number: 14

Youth career
- 2013–2014: Central Coast Mariners
- 2014: Nike Academy

Senior career*
Years	Team	Apps	(Gls)
2014	Manly United	1	(0)
2015	Central Coast Mariners	0	(0)
2015–2017	Manly United	58	(23)
2018–2019	Zemun	1	(0)
2019–	Manly United	56	(13)

International career^{‡}
2015–2016	Australia U20	7	(3)
Medal record
Men's football
Representing Australia
AFF U-19 Youth Championship
First place	2016 Vietnam	U-20 Team
- * Club domestic league appearances and goals as of 28 September 2022 ‡ National team caps and goals as of 21 April 2018

Dejan Pandurevic (Serbian: Dejan Pandurević/Дејан Пандуревић, born 17 January 1997) is an Australian professional soccer player who plays as a midfielder for Manly United.

Born in Sydney, Pandurevic played youth football with the Nike Academy before making his senior debut for Manly United in 2014. He returned to Manly after a short time with Central Coast Mariners, before moving to Serbia with FK Zemun in 2018.

He has represented Australia under-20.

== Early life ==
Pandurevic is an Australian of Serbian descent.

== Club career ==
In 2014, aged 17, Pandurevic was selected as the Australian representative at the Nike Academy in England.

In December 2014, after returning to Australia, Pandurevic went to Central Coast Mariners on trial. He signed with the Mariners one month later, following in the footsteps of fellow Nike Academy Graduate Tom Rogic. Pandurevic left the club in May 2015 after his contract was not renewed.

Pandurevic then returned to Manly United, where he played 43 games and scored 19 goals in the 2015 and 2016 seasons.

Pandurevic signed with Serbian club FK Zemun during the winter-break of 2017–18 season. He debuted on 21 April 2018 in a Serbian super league game against Javor.

== International career ==
Pandurevic was called to for the qualifying games of Young Socceroos for the 2015 AFF U-19 Youth Championship against the Philippines, Laos and Japan played in October 2015. He scored the 6th goal when he entered as a substitute in the game against the Philippines which ended as an extensive 6–0 win. Then he was called again to be part of the young socceroos training camp held in July 2016. Pandurevic scored twice in their ASEAN Football Federation Under-19 Championship game against Myanmar.

== Honours ==
=== International ===
Australia U20

- AFF U-19 Youth Championship: 2016
