= Eddy Bosnar =

Australian soccer player (born 1980)

Personal information
- Date of birth: 29 April 1980 (age 46)
- Place of birth: Sydney, Australia
- Position: Centre back

Youth career
- AIS

Senior career*
Years	Team	Apps	(Gls)
1997–1998	Newcastle Breakers	6	(1)
1998–1999	Northern Spirit	13	(0)
1999–2000	Sydney United	27	(1)
2000–2001	Dinamo Zagreb	20	(0)
2001–2004	Sturm Graz	53	(2)
2004–2005	Everton	0	(0)
2005	Dinamo Zagreb	8	(0)
2006	Rijeka	8	(0)
2006–2008	Heracles Almelo	42	(1)
2008–2009	JEF United Chiba	55	(3)
2010–2011	Shimizu S-Pulse	55	(8)
2012–2013	Suwon Bluewings	36	(2)
2013	Guangzhou R&F	13	(1)
2014–2015	Central Coast Mariners	30	(4)
2016	Sydney United 58	12	(1)

International career
1996–1997	Australia U17	9	(0)
1998–1999	Australia U20	10	(0)
2000	Australia U23	2	(0)
Medal record
Representing Australia
Men's Association football
OFC U-20 Championship
Winner	1998 Samoa
- * Club domestic league appearances and goals as of 14 September 2016

Eddy Bosnar (born 29 April 1980) is an Australian former professional soccer player who played as a centre back.

== Playing style ==
He scored numerous goals for his clubs with his free kicks.

== Club career ==
After graduating from the Australian Institute of Sport Football Program, Bosnar began his professional career in 1997 with Newcastle Breakers. After staying in Australia for a few seasons with Northern Spirit and Sydney United, Bosnar moved to Croatia in 2000 to play with Dinamo Zagreb. After three years in Austria with Sturm Graz, Bosnar moved to England to play with Everton, but he failed to make an appearance in the Premier League for Everton, and he was released after one season due to injury. Bosnar then returned to old club Dinamo Zagreb, before briefly playing with Rijeka. Bosnar moved to the Netherlands in 2006 to spend two seasons with Heracles Almelo, before moving to Japan in 2008 with JEF United Chiba. He moved to Shimizu S-Pulse in 2010. Bosnar left Japan at the end of that season and joined Suwon Samsung Bluewings in the K-League. His free kick against Ulsan Hyundai in May 2012, measured at 123 km/h (76 mph), was chosen unofficial K-League goal of the year for 2012. On 18 July 2013, Bosnar transferred to Chinese Super League side Guangzhou R&F.

On 1 February 2014, Bosnar signed with Central Coast Mariners until the end of May of that year. On 10 November 2015, Bosnar was released from his contract eight months early, after the player fell out of favour with Mariners coach Tony Walmsley.

Bosnar returned to Sydney United in February 2016, fifteen years after last playing for the club.

== International career ==
Bosnar has represented Australia at all youth team levels including captaining the Joeys. He also represented Australia at the 1999 FIFA World Youth Championship, making three appearances.

== Later career ==
Bosnar was the Western Sydney Wanderers recruitment chief.

== Personal life ==
Bosnar is of Croatian origin.

His two younger brothers Milan and Ivan were also soccer players.

Bosnar, along with his brothers Milan, Ivan and Marko, run the Australian franchise of Croatian bakery "Mlinar" in Western Sydney.

== Honours ==
Sydney United

- Waratah Cup: 2016

Australia U-20

- OFC U-19 Men's Championship: 1998
