= Brent Griffiths =

English footballer (born 1990)

Personal information
- Full name: Brent Griffiths
- Date of birth: 24 March 1990 (age 36)
- Place of birth: Stoke-on-Trent, England
- Height: 1.88 m (6 ft 2 in)
- Position: Defender

Team information
- Current team: Gwelup Croatia

Youth career
- 2006–2008: Blackburn Rovers
- 2008–2009: Perth Glory

Senior career*
Years	Team	Apps	(Gls)
2009–2011	Perth Glory	9	(0)
2011	Stirling Lions	8	(0)
2011–2012	Wellington Phoenix	7	(0)
2012	Heidelberg United	9	(1)
2012–2015	Central Coast Mariners	11	(0)
2015–2016	Penang	7	(0)
2017–2020	Bayswater City	38	(0)
2021	Gwelup Croatia	11	(0)
2022–	Balcatta Etna	11	(1)
- * Club domestic league appearances and goals as of 23 November 2023

Brent Griffiths (born 24 March 1990) is an English footballer who plays as a defender for Gwelup Croatia.

== Early life ==
Griffiths was born in Stoke-on-Trent, England, and raised in the northern suburbs of Perth, Western Australia. He attended Mater Dei College in Edgewater, Western Australia

== Club career ==
=== Perth Glory ===
In May 2009, Griffiths was signed to a professional contract by Perth Glory after playing a season in the national youth league.

=== Stirling Lions ===
After Leaving the Glory, Griffiths joined local Perth team Stirling Lions. While at the club Griffiths went on trial with A-League teams Adelaide United and Central Coast Mariners.

=== Wellington Phoenix ===
Griffiths crossed the ditch to trial with the Wellington Phoenix. On 30 September 2011, Griffiths was signed by A-League club Wellington Phoenix on a one-year contract after a successful trial.

=== Central Coast Mariners ===
On 30 July 2012 it was announced he had signed a one-year deal to play for Central Coast Mariners in the A-League. Griffiths has since won the A-league with Central Coast Mariners in the 2012–13 season whilst also qualifying for the round 16 of the Asian champions league.

=== Penang ===
After Griffiths was released by the Mariners at the end of the 2014–15 season, he signed with Malaysian Super League side Penang FA.

On 9 July 2016, Griffiths and Penang mutually terminated his contract.

=== Bayswater City ===
In March 2017, Griffiths joined NPL Western Australia side Bayswater City on a two-year contract. And as of 25 May, has garnered the most red cards for a single player in the club's history.

=== Gwelup Croatia ===
In December 2020, Brent signed with Gwelup Croatia for the 2021 season.

=== Balcatta Etna FC ===
In June 2022, Brent signed with Balcatta Etna FC for the remainder of the 2022 NPL Season, assisting them in fighting relegation and remaining in top flight football in Western Australia.

== Personal life ==
His elder brother, Rostyn Griffiths is also a footballer, playing for Mumbai City and previously appeared in Eredivisie with Roda JC. The brothers were together, during their stints in the youth set up of English Premier League side, Blackburn Rovers.
