= Phil Moss =

English-born Australian soccer player and manager

Personal information
- Date of birth: 5 October 1971 (age 55)
- Place of birth: London, England
- Position: Defender

Senior career*
Years	Team	Apps	(Gls)
1992	Manly-Warringah		
1997	Central Coast United		
1998	Eastern Suburbs		
1998–2000	Northern Spirit		
2000	Fraser Park FC		
2000–2001	Northern Spirit		
2002–2004	Manly-Warringah		
2004–2005	Manly United		

Managerial career
- 2003–2004: Manly-Warringah
- 2004–2010: Manly United
- 2010–2013: Central Coast Mariners (assistant)
- 2013–2015: Central Coast Mariners
- 2017–2018: Sydney FC (assistant)
- * Club domestic league appearances and goals as of 3 January 2014 ‡ National team caps and goals as of 3 January 2014

Phil Moss (born 5 October 1971) is an English-born Australian association football manager and former player who was most recently assistant coach of Sydney FC.

== Early life ==
Moss was born in London, England to Jewish parents and arrived in Australia as a child. His younger brother, Jonathan later became a first-class cricketer.

He attended Sydney Church of England Grammar School from 1984 to 1989.

== Career ==
=== Playing career ===
Moss came through the ranks at Manly United before making his first grade debut at 17, and enjoyed a season at the Central Coast Coasties in 1997, ironically alongside his new colleague, in Mariners Head of Sports Science Andrew Clark. Moss then made his mark in the old National Soccer League under Graham Arnold as a defender come midfielder at Northern Spirit via a short spell at Eastern Suburbs, before ultimately returning to his old stomping ground.

Moss represented Australia in football at the 1997 Maccabiah Games. At the games opening ceremony a bridge he was about to step onto collapsed, killing several members of the Australian team and injuring a number of others including his brother Jonathan.

=== Coaching career ===
At Cromer Park, Moss was player coach briefly before taking the reins as Head Coach, and steering the club toward the NSW Premier League.

Before entering as a coach at State League level, Phil had coached Dee Why Football Club in 1996, who were at the time a Premier League team in the Manly Warringah Football Association competition. It was here that he made his mark winning the Grand Final, beating Pittwater RSL (2-1), winning the MWFA Cup (knockout competition), then winning the MWFA sixaside competition and even taking the team to defeat Manly United's first grade squad in an exhibition match on Cromer Park's number one field.

Moss served for two years as an assistant coach with the Olyroos. He assisted Graham Arnold during the successful qualification campaign for the 2008 Beijing Olympics with the Olyroos.

After serving served as Graham Arnold's assistant at the Mariners from July 2010, Moss was appointed the new manager of the Central Coast Mariners on 14 November 2013. He succeeded Graham Arnold, who was signed by J.League team Vegalta Sendai. Prior to his appointment, Moss had held the assistant coaching role at the Mariners for three seasons; over this time the club won one championship, one premiership and made the grand final in two of the three seasons of his tenure. Under Moss, the Mariners managed third-placed finish in the A-League. After defeating Adelaide United in the elimination finals, the Mariners were eventually eliminated by the Western Sydney Wanderers in the semi-finals.

On 6 March 2015, Moss was sacked by the Mariners.

Moss later took legal action against the Mariners on the basis of wrongful dismissal, having been dismissed just seven months into a three-year contract, with Moss claiming the balance of his $150,000 salary plus breach-of-contract damages. He eventually received approximately $500,000 from the Mariners; this sum is believed to be the biggest payout over a coach's sacking in A-League history.

Moss joined Sydney FC as assistant coach in June 2017. He left in June 2018.

== Managerial statistics ==
As of 19 December 2016

Team	Nat	From	To	Record				
Team	Nat	From	To	G	W	D	L	Win %
Central Coast Mariners	(Australia)	14 November 2013	5 March 2015	54	20	10	24	37.04
Total				54	20	10	24	37.04
