= A-League transfers for 2015–16 season =

This is a list of Australian soccer transfers for the 2015–16 A-League. Only moves featuring at least one A-League club are listed.

Clubs were able to sign players at any time, but many transfers will only officially go through on 1 June because the majority of player contracts finish on 31 May.

== Transfers ==
All players without a flag are Australian. Clubs without a flag are clubs participating in the A-League.

=== Pre-season ===
Date	Name	Moving from	Moving to
29 January 2015	(Malta) John Hutchinson	Central Coast Mariners	Retired
16 February 2015	Nigel Boogaard	Adelaide United	Newcastle Jets
24 February 2015	(New Zealand) Tyler Boyd	Wellington Phoenix	(Portugal) Vitória de Guimarães
7 March 2015	Andrew Hoole	Newcastle Jets	Sydney FC
10 March 2015	(Republic of Ireland) Damien Duff	Melbourne City	Unattached
30 March 2015	Brent Griffiths	Central Coast Mariners	Unattached
15 April 2015	Zenon Caravella	Newcastle Jets	Retired
18 April 2015	Rostyn Griffiths	Perth Glory	Unattached
20 April 2015	Jess Vanstrattan	Newcastle Jets	Retired
28 April 2015	Taylor Regan	Newcastle Jets	Unattached
28 April 2015	James Virgili	Newcastle Jets	Unattached
28 April 2015	Sam Gallagher	Newcastle Jets	Unattached
28 April 2015	John Solari	Newcastle Jets	Unattached
29 April 2015	Andy Brennan	(Australia) South Melbourne	Newcastle Jets
1 May 2015	Isaka Cernak	Central Coast Mariners	Unattached
1 May 2015	Hayden Morton	Central Coast Mariners	(Australia) Blacktown Spartans
1 May 2015	Tom Slater	Central Coast Mariners	Unattached
1 May 2015	Dejan Pandurevic	Central Coast Mariners	(Australia) Manly United
5 May 2015	(Costa Rica) Kenny Cunningham	Wellington Phoenix	Unattached
5 May 2015	Josh Brindell-South	Wellington Phoenix	Unattached
5 May 2015	(New Zealand) Jason Hicks	Wellington Phoenix	Unattached
13 May 2015	Yianni Perkatis	Western Sydney Wanderers	(Australia) Blacktown City
13 May 2015	(Netherlands) Kew Jaliens	Melbourne City	Unattached
13 May 2015	(Netherlands) Rob Wielaert	Melbourne City	Unattached
13 May 2015	Iain Ramsay	Melbourne City	Unattached
15 May 2015	Tomi Juric	Western Sydney Wanderers	Unattached
15 May 2015	Nikita Rukavytsya	Western Sydney Wanderers	Unattached
15 May 2015	Kerem Bulut	Western Sydney Wanderers	Unattached
15 May 2015	Nick Ward	Western Sydney Wanderers	Unattached
15 May 2015	Nick Kalmar	Western Sydney Wanderers	Unattached
15 May 2015	Adrian Madaschi	Western Sydney Wanderers	Unattached
15 May 2015	Jack Duncan	Perth Glory	(Denmark) Randers FC
18 May 2015	(New Zealand) Michael Boxall	Wellington Phoenix	(South Africa) SuperSport United
22 May 2015	(Netherlands) Youssouf Hersi	Perth Glory	Unattached
22 May 2015	Travis Cooper	Newcastle Jets	(Australia) Adamstown Rosebud
23 May 2015	Antony Golec	Western Sydney Wanderers	Perth Glory
23 May 2015	Jordan Brown	Melbourne Victory	Unattached
23 May 2015	Nathan Coe	Melbourne Victory	Unattached
23 May 2015	Andrew Nabbout	Melbourne Victory	Unattached
23 May 2015	(Hungary) Richárd Vernes	Central Coast Mariners	(Hungary) Budapest Honvéd (end of loan)
24 May 2015	(Austria) Marc Janko	Sydney FC	Unattached
25 May 2015	Brandon O'Neill	Unattached	Sydney FC
25 May 2015	Massimo Murdocca	Melbourne City	(Australia) Avondale
26 May 2015	Kofi Danning	Brisbane Roar	(Australia) Oakleigh Cannons
27 May 2015	Adam Sarota	Brisbane Roar	(Netherlands) Utrecht (end of loan)
27 May 2015	George Lambadaridis	Brisbane Roar	Unattached
29 May 2015	Ivan Necevski	Sydney FC	Unattached
30 May 2015	(Republic of Ireland) Roy O'Donovan	Unattached	Central Coast Mariners
30 May 2015	(Serbia) Andrija Kaluđerović	Brisbane Roar	Unattached
31 May 2015	Scott Jamieson	Perth Glory	Western Sydney Wanderers
1 June 2015	Bernie Ibini	Sydney FC	(China) Shanghai SIPG (end of loan)
1 June 2015	Mitch Austin	(England) Cambridge United	Central Coast Mariners
3 June 2015	Saša Ognenovski	Sydney FC	Unattached
3 June 2015	Peter Triantis	Sydney FC	Unattached
3 June 2015	Nick Carle	Sydney FC	Unattached
4 June 2015	Ivan Franjic	Unattached	Melbourne City
4 June 2015	Danny Vukovic	Perth Glory	Melbourne Victory
6 June 2015	(Japan) Yojiro Takahagi	Western Sydney Wanderers	Unattached
6 June 2015	(Japan) Yūsuke Tanaka	Western Sydney Wanderers	Unattached
8 June 2015	Steve Kuzmanovski	Western Sydney Wanderers	Melbourne City
9 June 2015	Themba Muata-Marlow	Sydney FC	Newcastle Jets
9 June 2015	Scott Neville	Newcastle Jets	Western Sydney Wanderers
9 June 2015	Jacob Pepper	Newcastle Jets	Western Sydney Wanderers
12 June 2015	Riley Woodcock	Perth Glory	Sydney FC
18 June 2015	Andrew Redmayne	Melbourne City	Western Sydney Wanderers
18 June 2015	Joel Griffiths	Wellington Phoenix	Unattached
19 June 2015	Alex Grant	(England) Stoke City	Perth Glory
20 June 2015	Mark Birighitti	(Italy) Varese	Newcastle Jets (end of loan)
22 June 2015	Corey Gameiro	Sydney FC	Melbourne City
24 June 2015	(Serbia) Nikola Petković	Sydney FC	(Belgium) Westerlo
24 June 2015	Mark Milligan	Melbourne Victory	(United Arab Emirates) Baniyas
24 June 2015	Jerrad Tyson	(Hong Kong) Sun Pegasus	Perth Glory
26 June 2015	(Italy) Iacopo La Rocca	Western Sydney Wanderers	Adelaide United
26 June 2015	Joshua Kennedy	Melbourne City	Retired
30 June 2015	(Spain) Miguel Palanca	Adelaide United	Unattached
1 July 2015	(Spain) Andreu	(Spain) Racing de Santander	Western Sydney Wanderers
4 July 2015	Hagi Gligor	Sydney FC	Perth Glory
4 July 2015	Mitch Nichols	(Japan) Cerezo Osaka	Western Sydney Wanderers
4 July 2015	George Mells	Unattached	Adelaide United
5 July 2015	Jamie Maclaren	Perth Glory	Brisbane Roar
7 July 2015	Matthew Nash	Central Coast Mariners	Retired
8 July 2015	Paul Izzo	Adelaide United	Central Coast Mariners
8 July 2015	Ante Covic	Western Sydney Wanderers	Perth Glory
8 July 2015	Nathan Burns	Wellington Phoenix	(Japan) FC Tokyo
13 July 2015	Lachlan Jackson	Brisbane Roar	Newcastle Jets
13 July 2015	(Northern Ireland) Aaron Hughes	Unattached	Melbourne City
14 July 2015	Michael Zullo	Unattached	Melbourne City
15 July 2015	Zachary Anderson	Central Coast Mariners	Sydney FC
16 July 2015	(Hungary) György Sándor	Unattached	Perth Glory
17 July 2015	Matthew Spiranovic	Western Sydney Wanderers	(China) Hangzhou Greentown
17 July 2015	(Serbia) Miloš Ninković	Unattached	Sydney FC
17 July 2015	Jason Hoffman	Melbourne City	Newcastle Jets
17 July 2015	Blake Powell	(Australia) APIA Leichhardt Tigers	Wellington Phoenix
20 July 2015	Awer Mabil	Adelaide United	(Denmark) Midtjylland
20 July 2015	(Slovenia) Filip Hološko	Unattached	Sydney FC
21 July 2015	Labinot Haliti	Western Sydney Wanderers	Newcastle Jets
21 July 2015	(Croatia) Mateo Poljak	Western Sydney Wanderers	Newcastle Jets
24 July 2015	Sam Gallaway	Western Sydney Wanderers	Unattached
24 July 2015	Eli Babalj	(Netherlands) AZ	Adelaide United (loan)
24 July 2015	Cameron Watson	Adelaide United	Newcastle Jets
27 July 2015	(Republic of Ireland) Andy Keogh	Perth Glory	Unattached
27 July 2015	(Italy) Federico Piovaccari	Unattached	Western Sydney Wanderers
29 July 2015	Harry Ascroft	Unattached	Central Coast Mariners
3 August 2015	(Spain) Dimas	Unattached	Western Sydney Wanderers
3 August 2015	Matt Simon	Central Coast Mariners	Sydney FC
5 August 2015	Marc Warren	(Australia) APIA Leichhardt Tigers	Perth Glory
6 August 2015	(Spain) Diego Castro	Unattached	Perth Glory
9 August 2015	(Spain) Alberto	Unattached	Western Sydney Wanderers
10 August 2015	(Uruguay) Bruno Fornaroli	Unattached	Melbourne City
11 August 2015	(Netherlands) Guyon Fernandez	Unattached	Perth Glory
16 August 2015	Mate Dugandzic	Melbourne City	Adelaide United
18 August 2015	Terry Antonis	Sydney FC	(Greece) PAOK
20 August 2015	(Brazil) Leonardo	Unattached	Newcastle Jets
25 August 2015	(Netherlands) Jeffrey Sarpong	Unattached	Wellington Phoenix
25 August 2015	Alex Mullen	(United States) Mars Hill University	Sydney FC
26 August 2015	Daniel De Silva	Perth Glory	(Netherlands) Roda JC Kerkrade (loan)
28 August 2015	Luke Brattan	Brisbane Roar	Unattached
31 August 2015	(Argentina) Jonatan Germano	Melbourne City	Unattached
31 August 2015	(Denmark) Thomas Sørensen	Unattached	Melbourne City
31 August 2015	Ivan Necevski	(Australia) Rockdale City Suns	Sydney FC
2 September 2015	Oliver Bozanic	Unattached	Melbourne Victory
3 September 2015	(England) Daniel Heffernan	(Australia) Heidelberg United	Central Coast Mariners
16 September 2015	Jason Trifiro	Western Sydney Wanderers	Melbourne City
21 September 2015	Dario Vidošić	(Switzerland) Sion	Western Sydney Wanderers
23 September 2015	George Lambadaridis	Unattached	Brisbane Roar
24 September 2015	(Serbia) Miloš Trifunović	(Serbia) Radnički Niš	Newcastle Jets
27 September 2015	Callum Richardson	(England) Burnley	Melbourne City
28 September 2015	Troy Danaskos	(Australia) Sydney Olympic	Wellington Phoenix
29 September 2015	Giancarlo Gallifuoco	Unattached	Melbourne Victory
30 September 2015	(Spain) Corona	Unattached	Brisbane Roar
7 October 2015	(Spain) Javier Hervás	Unattached	Brisbane Roar

=== Mid-season ===
Date	Name	Moving from	Moving to
12 October 2015	Dylan Fox	(Australia) Bonnyrigg White Eagles	Wellington Phoenix
1 November 2015	Aryn Williams	Unattached	Perth Glory
10 November 2015	Eddy Bosnar	Central Coast Mariners	Unattached
21 November 2015	Ryan Kitto	(Australia) West Torrens Birkalla	Newcastle Jets
23 November 2015	Tomislav Uskok	(Australia) Melbourne Knights	Central Coast Mariners
11 December 2015	(Republic of Ireland) Andy Keogh	Unattached	Perth Glory
13 December 2015	Liam Reddy	Central Coast Mariners	Western Sydney Wanderers
15 December 2015	(South Korea) Lee Ki-je	Newcastle Jets	(South Korea) Ulsan Hyundai
28 December 2015	Nathan Konstandopoulos	Adelaide United	Unattached
4 January 2016	Francesco Stella	(Australia) Avondale	Central Coast Mariners
4 January 2016	Alastair Bray	(Australia) Green Gully	Central Coast Mariners
6 January 2016	Jai Ingham	(Australia) Hume City	Melbourne Victory
6 January 2016	Tando Velaphi	Melbourne City	Unattached
6 January 2016	Dean Bouzanis	Western Sydney Wanderers	Melbourne City
7 January 2016	(Netherlands) Guyon Fernandez	Perth Glory	Unattached
7 January 2016	Steven Ugarković	Unattached	Newcastle Jets
9 January 2016	(Brazil) Sidnei	Perth Glory	Unattached
15 January 2016	Anthony Cáceres	Central Coast Mariners	(England) Manchester City
16 January 2016	(Papua New Guinea) Brad McDonald	(Australia) Manly United	Central Coast Mariners
16 January 2016	(Spain) Luis García	Unattached	Central Coast Mariners
17 January 2016	Antony Golec	Perth Glory	(Moldova) Sheriff Tiraspol
18 January 2016	Michael Thwaite	Perth Glory	(China) Liaoning Whowin
19 January 2016	Anthony Cáceres	(England) Manchester City	Melbourne City (loan)
19 January 2016	David Williams	Melbourne City	Unattached
19 January 2016	Kosta Petratos	FFA Centre of Excellence	Perth Glory
20 January 2016	Matthew Fletcher	Unattached	Central Coast Mariners
21 January 2016	(Slovenia) Robert Koren	Melbourne City	Unattached
23 January 2016	Stefan Mauk	Melbourne City	Adelaide United
23 January 2016	Osama Malik	Adelaide United	Melbourne City
23 January 2016	Nick Fitzgerald	Central Coast Mariners	Melbourne City
27 January 2016	Adam Taggart	(England) Fulham	Perth Glory
27 January 2016	Shane Lowry	Unattached	Perth Glory
27 January 2016	James Jeggo	Adelaide United	(Austria) Sturm Graz
28 January 2016	(Denmark) Morten Nordstrand	Unattached	Newcastle Jets
28 January 2016	Joe Caletti	FFA Centre of Excellence	Brisbane Roar
30 January 2016	(Hungary) Krisztián Vadócz	Unattached	Perth Glory
31 January 2016	(Netherlands) Jeffrey Sarpong	Wellington Phoenix	Unattached
31 January 2016	Alex Gersbach	Sydney FC	(Norway) Rosenborg
1 February 2016	Matt Sim	Central Coast Mariners	Western Sydney Wanderers
1 February 2016	Jackson Bandiera	FFA Centre of Excellence	Western Sydney Wanderers
1 February 2016	Anthony Kalik	Central Coast Mariners	(Croatia) Hajduk Split (loan)
2 February 2016	Erik Paartalu	Melbourne City	Unattached
2 February 2016	David Carney	Newcastle Jets	Sydney FC
3 February 2016	(Indonesia) Sergio van Dijk	Unattached	Adelaide United
3 February 2016	Abraham Yango	Brisbane Roar	(Australia) Avondale
5 February 2016	Alex Wilkinson	Unattached	Melbourne City
5 February 2016	Hernan Espindola	Melbourne City	(Australia) Hume City
10 February 2016	(New Zealand) Hamish Watson	(New Zealand) Hawke's Bay United	Wellington Phoenix
17 February 2016	Matt Millar	Melbourne City	(Australia) South Melbourne
19 February 2016	Themba Muata-Marlow	Newcastle Jets	(Australia) APIA Leichhardt Tigers
29 February 2016	Tommy Oar	Unattached	Brisbane Roar
1 March 2016	Glen Trifiro	Central Coast Mariners	Unattached
5 March 2016	Jacob Collard	Perth Glory	(Australia) Olympia
1 April 2016	(Serbia) Miloš Trifunović	Newcastle Jets	Unattached

Player was released to free agency before joining new club
