= 2015–16 Central Coast Mariners FC season =

Central Coast Mariners
2015–16 season
- Chairman: Michael Charlesworth
- Manager: Tony Walmsley
- Stadium: Central Coast Stadium
- A-League: 10th
- FFA Cup: Round of 32
- Top goalscorer: Roy O'Donovan (8 goals)
- Highest home attendance: 14,268 vs. Melbourne Victory (8 January 2016)
- Lowest home attendance: 4,514 vs. Melbourne City (3 December 2015)
- Average home league attendance: 8,111

The 2015–16 Central Coast Mariners FC season was the club's 11th season since its establishment in 2004. The club participated in the A-League for the 11th time and the FFA Cup for the 2nd time.

== Review ==
=== Pre-season ===
The Mariners entered the 2015–16 season with significant change, following a relatively unsuccessful 2014–15 season. It was announced in April 2015 that Tony Walmsley would be given the permanent manager position, having previously filled the role in an interim capacity. Nick Montgomery was named club captain following the retirement of long-serving midfielder John Hutchinson in May 2015. There was also significant early activity in the transfer market, with a number of players released. The most notable of these was striker and club-record goalscorer Matt Simon. The club's first signing of the season was Irish former Premier League striker Roy O'Donovan. In July, after ten seasons with the club as a player, goalkeeping coach and assistant coach, John Crawley left the club to take up a position at Sydney FC. His position was taken by the retiring Matthew Nash, whose place in the squad was taken in turn by former Adelaide United and Young Socceroos goalkeeper Paul Izzo.

The Mariners won their opening pre-season friendly, a 2–1 victory over F3 Derby rivals Newcastle Jets in a training match. This was followed by a win over Western Sydney Wanderers two days later, with triallist Dan Heffernan scoring a hat-trick.

Central Coast were eliminated in the first round of the 2015 FFA Cup by Wellington Phoenix, an error from goalkeeper Paul Izzo and a missed penalty from Roy O'Donovan consigning the team to a 1–0 loss.

The club had a pre-season tour to Canberra in mid-August, which saw them pick up wins over Canberra Olympic and Gungahlin United.

=== October ===
The Mariners started the 2015–16 A-League season with a win over Perth Glory. After Roy O'Donovan scored the opening goal of the season from a rebound, two second-half penalties scored by Fábio Ferreira gave Central Coast a 3–2 win.

== Players ==
=== Squad information ===
Note: Flags indicate national team as defined under FIFA eligibility rules; some limited exceptions apply. Players may hold more than one non-FIFA nationality.

| No. | Pos. | Nation | Player |
|---|---|---|---|
| 1 | GK | AUS | Paul Izzo |
| 2 | DF | NZL | Storm Roux |
| 3 | DF | AUS | Joshua Rose |
| 4 | MF | AUS | Jacob Poscoliero |
| 5 | DF | AUS | Harry Ascroft |
| 6 | MF | AUS | Mitch Austin |
| 7 | MF | POR | Fábio Ferreira |
| 8 | MF | SCO | Nick Montgomery (captain) |
| 9 | FW | IRL | Roy O'Donovan |
| 10 | MF | ESP | Luis García |
| 12 | FW | AUS | Trent Buhagiar |

| No. | Pos. | Nation | Player |
|---|---|---|---|
| 13 | GK | AUS | Alastair Bray |
| 14 | FW | ENG | Daniel Heffernan |
| 15 | DF | PNG | Brad McDonald |
| 16 | MF | AUS | Liam Rose |
| 17 | FW | AUS | Francesco Stella |
| 19 | FW | AUS | Josh Bingham |
| 21 | DF | AUS | Michael Neill |
| 22 | MF | AUS | Jake McGing |
| 23 | DF | AUS | Tomislav Uskok |
| 28 | FW | AUS | Matthew Fletcher |

=== Transfers in ===
| No. | Pos. | Nat. | Name | Age | Moving from | Type | Transfer window | Ends | Transfer fee | Source |
|---|---|---|---|---|---|---|---|---|---|---|
| 1 | GK | (Australia) | Paul Izzo | 20 | Adelaide United | Transfer | Pre-season | 2017 | | ccmariners.com.au |
| 5 | DF | (Australia) | Harry Ascroft | 20 | Free agent | Transfer | Pre-season | 2018 | | ccmariners.com.au |
| 6 | MF | (Australia) | Mitch Austin | 24 | Cambridge United (England) | Transfer | Pre-season | 2017 | | ccmariners.com.au |
| 9 | FW | (Republic of Ireland) | Roy O'Donovan | 29 | Mitra Kukar (Indonesia) | Transfer | Pre-season | 2017 | | ccmariners.com.au |
| 14 | FW | (England) | Daniel Heffernan | 28 | Heidelberg United | Transfer | Pre-season | 2016 | | ccmariners.com.au |
| 23 | DF | (Australia) | Tomislav Uskok | 24 | Melbourne Knights | Transfer | Round 7 | 2016 | | ccmariners.com.au |
| 17 | FW | (Australia) | Francesco Stella | 24 | Avondale FC | Transfer | Round 14 | 2016 | | ccmariners.com.au |
| 13 | GK | (Australia) | Alastair Bray | 22 | Green Gully | Transfer | Round 14 | 2016 | | ccmariners.com.au |
| 15 | DF | (Papua New Guinea) | Brad McDonald | 25 | Manly United | Transfer | Round 15 | 2017 | | ccmariners.com.au |
| 10 | MF | (Spain) | Luis García | 37 | Free agent | Transfer | Round 15 | 2016 | | ccmariners.com.au |
| 28 | FW | (Australia) | Matthew Fletcher | 23 | Free agent | Transfer | Round 15 | 2017 | | ccmariners.com.au |

=== Transfers out ===
| No. | Pos. | Nat. | Name | Age | Moving to | Type | Transfer window | Transfer fee | Source |
|---|---|---|---|---|---|---|---|---|---|
| 1 | GK | (Australia) | Matthew Nash | 34 | | Retired | Pre-season | | ccmariners.com.au |
| 5 | DF | (Australia) | Zachary Anderson | 24 | Sydney FC | Released | Pre-season | | sydneyfc.com |
| 6 | DF | (Australia) | Brent Griffiths | 25 | | Released | Pre-season | | a-league.com.au |
| 7 | MF | (Malta) | John Hutchinson | 35 | | Retired | Pre-season | | |
| 17 | MF | (Hungary) | Richárd Vernes | 23 | Budapest Honvéd (Hungary) | Loan terminated | Pre-season | | nemzetisport.hu (in Hungarian) |
| 19 | FW | (Australia) | Matt Simon | 28 | Sydney FC | Released | Pre-season | | sydneyfc.com |
| 22 | MF | (Australia) | Tom Slater | 18 | | Released | Pre-season | | a-league.com.au |
| 23 | MF | (Australia) | Isaka Cernak | 26 | SuperSport United (South Africa) | Released | Pre-season | | goal.com |
| 24 | DF | (Australia) | Hayden Morton | 21 | | Released | Pre-season | | a-league.com.au |
| 29 | MF | (Australia) | Dejan Pandurevic | 18 | Manly United | Released | Pre-season | | a-league.com.au |
| 23 | DF | (Australia) | Eddy Bosnar | 35 | | Released | Round 5 | | ccmariners.com.au |
| 12 | GK | (Australia) | Liam Reddy | 34 | | Released | Round 10 | | ccmariners.com.au |
| 11 | FW | (Australia) | Nick Fitzgerald | 23 | | Released | Round 14 | | ccmariners.com.au |
| 10 | MF | (Australia) | Anthony Cáceres | 23 | Manchester City (England) | Transfer | Round 15 | $300,000 | ccmariners.com.au |
| 15 | MF | (Australia) | Matt Sim | 27 | | Released | Round 15 | | ccmariners.com.au |
| 20 | MF | (Australia) | Anthony Kalik | 18 | Hajduk Split (Croatia) | Loan | Round 18 | | ccmariners.com.au |
| 18 | MF | (Australia) | Glen Trifiro | 26 | | Released | Round 21 | | ccmariners.com.au |

== Club ==
=== Coaching staff ===
| Position | Staff |
|---|---|
| Head coach Technical director | (Australia) Tony Walmsley |
| Assistant coach | (Malta) John Hutchinson |
| Goalkeeping coach | (Australia) Matthew Nash |
| Strength and conditioning coach | (Australia) Brice Johnson |
| Physiotherapist | (Australia) Andrew Nealon |
| Youth football coach | (New Zealand) Stu Jacobs |
| Head of sports science | (Australia) Tim Knight |

=== Other information ===
| Majority Owner/Chairman | (England) Michael Charlesworth |
| Executive Vice Chairman | (England) Peter Storrie |
| Chief Executive Officer | (Australia) Shaun Mielekamp |
| Ground (capacity and dimensions) | Central Coast Stadium (20,059 / 105x68 metres) |

Source: ccmariners.com.au

== Statistics ==
=== Squad statistics ===
| N | Pos. | Nat. | Name | Total | | | | | A-League | | | | | FFA Cup |
| N | Pos. | Nat. | Name | Apps | Goals | Yellow card | Second yellow card | Red card | Apps | Goals | Yellow card | Second yellow card | Red card | Apps | Goals | Yellow card | Second yellow card | Red card |
|---|---|---|---|---|---|---|---|---|---|---|---|---|---|---|---|---|---|---|
| 1 | GK | (Australia) | Paul Izzo | 22 | 0 | 0 | 1 | 0 | 21 | 0 | 0 | 1 | 0 | 1 | 0 | 0 | 0 | 0 |
| 2 | DF | (New Zealand) | Storm Roux | 21 | 1 | 1 | 0 | 0 | 20 | 1 | 1 | 0 | 0 | 1 | 0 | 0 | 0 | 0 |
| 3 | DF | (Australia) | Joshua Rose | 24 | 0 | 4 | 0 | 0 | 23 | 0 | 4 | 0 | 0 | 1 | 0 | 0 | 0 | 0 |
| 4 | MF | (Australia) | Jacob Poscoliero | 21 | 0 | 8 | 0 | 0 | 20+1 | 0 | 8 | 0 | 0 | 0 | 0 | 0 | 0 | 0 |
| 5 | DF | (Australia) | Harry Ascroft | 22 | 3 | 6 | 0 | 1 | 19+2 | 3 | 5 | 0 | 1 | 1 | 0 | 1 | 0 | 0 |
| 6 | MF | (Australia) | Mitch Austin | 24 | 5 | 3 | 1 | 0 | 22+1 | 5 | 3 | 1 | 0 | 0+1 | 0 | 0 | 0 | 0 |
| 7 | MF | (Portugal) | Fábio Ferreira | 22 | 7 | 1 | 1 | 0 | 18+3 | 7 | 1 | 1 | 0 | 1 | 0 | 0 | 0 | 0 |
| 8 | MF | (Scotland) | Nick Montgomery | 23 | 0 | 11 | 0 | 1 | 22 | 0 | 10 | 0 | 1 | 1 | 0 | 1 | 0 | 0 |
| 9 | FW | (Republic of Ireland) | Roy O'Donovan | 20 | 8 | 5 | 0 | 0 | 19 | 8 | 5 | 0 | 0 | 1 | 0 | 0 | 0 | 0 |
| 10 | MF | (Spain) | Luis García | 10 | 2 | 1 | 1 | 0 | 7+3 | 2 | 1 | 1 | 0 | 0 | 0 | 0 | 0 | 0 |
| 12 | FW | (Australia) | Trent Buhagiar | 5 | 0 | 0 | 0 | 0 | 2+3 | 0 | 0 | 0 | 0 | 0 | 0 | 0 | 0 | 0 |
| 13 | GK | (Australia) | Alastair Bray | 1 | 0 | 0 | 0 | 0 | 1 | 0 | 0 | 0 | 0 | 0 | 0 | 0 | 0 | 0 |
| 14 | FW | (England) | Daniel Heffernan | 7 | 0 | 0 | 0 | 0 | 3+4 | 0 | 0 | 0 | 0 | 0 | 0 | 0 | 0 | 0 |
| 15 | DF | (Papua New Guinea) | Brad McDonald | 8 | 0 | 0 | 0 | 0 | 0+8 | 0 | 0 | 0 | 0 | 0 | 0 | 0 | 0 | 0 |
| 16 | MF | (Australia) | Liam Rose | 25 | 0 | 5 | 0 | 0 | 18+6 | 0 | 5 | 0 | 0 | 0+1 | 0 | 0 | 0 | 0 |
| 17 | FW | (Australia) | Francesco Stella | 8 | 0 | 0 | 0 | 0 | 3+5 | 0 | 0 | 0 | 0 | 0 | 0 | 0 | 0 | 0 |
| 19 | MF | (Australia) | Josh Bingham | 20 | 3 | 3 | 0 | 0 | 7+13 | 3 | 3 | 0 | 0 | 0 | 0 | 0 | 0 | 0 |
| 21 | DF | (Australia) | Michael Neill | 21 | 1 | 3 | 1 | 0 | 16+4 | 1 | 3 | 1 | 0 | 1 | 0 | 0 | 0 | 0 |
| 22 | MF | (Australia) | Jake McGing | 23 | 0 | 4 | 0 | 1 | 20+2 | 0 | 4 | 0 | 1 | 1 | 0 | 0 | 0 | 0 |
| 23 | DF | (Australia) | Tomislav Uskok | 6 | 0 | 2 | 0 | 0 | 4+2 | 0 | 2 | 0 | 0 | 0 | 0 | 0 | 0 | 0 |
| 24 | DF | (Australia) | Jake Adelson | 2 | 0 | 1 | 0 | 0 | 1+1 | 0 | 1 | 0 | 0 | 0 | 0 | 0 | 0 | 0 |
| 25 | DF | (Australia) | Adam Berry | 1 | 0 | 0 | 0 | 0 | 0+1 | 0 | 0 | 0 | 0 | 0 | 0 | 0 | 0 | 0 |
| 26 | DF | (Australia) | Brian Jamba | 0 | 0 | 0 | 0 | 0 | 0 | 0 | 0 | 0 | 0 | 0 | 0 | 0 | 0 | 0 |
| 28 | FW | (Australia) | Matthew Fletcher | 7 | 0 | 0 | 0 | 0 | 2+5 | 0 | 0 | 0 | 0 | 0 | 0 | 0 | 0 | 0 |
| 30 | GK | (Australia) | Adam Pearce | 2 | 0 | 0 | 0 | 0 | 1+1 | 0 | 0 | 0 | 0 | 0 | 0 | 0 | 0 | 0 |
| 40 | GK | (Australia) | Tom Heward-Belle | 3 | 0 | 0 | 0 | 0 | 2+1 | 0 | 0 | 0 | 0 | 0 | 0 | 0 | 0 | 0 |
Players no longer at the club:
| 10 | MF | (Australia) | Anthony Cáceres | 13 | 0 | 1 | 0 | 0 | 11+1 | 0 | 1 | 0 | 0 | 1 | 0 | 0 | 0 | 0 |
| 11 | MF | (Australia) | Nick Fitzgerald | 12 | 1 | 1 | 1 | 0 | 11 | 1 | 1 | 1 | 0 | 1 | 0 | 0 | 0 | 0 |
| 12 | GK | (Australia) | Liam Reddy | 2 | 0 | 0 | 0 | 0 | 2 | 0 | 0 | 0 | 0 | 0 | 0 | 0 | 0 | 0 |
| 15 | MF | (Australia) | Matt Sim | 7 | 2 | 1 | 0 | 0 | 2+4 | 2 | 1 | 0 | 0 | 1 | 0 | 0 | 0 | 0 |
| 18 | MF | (Australia) | Glen Trifiro | 1 | 0 | 0 | 0 | 0 | 0+1 | 0 | 0 | 0 | 0 | 0 | 0 | 0 | 0 | 0 |
| 20 | MF | (Australia) | Anthony Kalik | 5 | 0 | 0 | 0 | 0 | 0+5 | 0 | 0 | 0 | 0 | 0 | 0 | 0 | 0 | 0 |
| 23 | DF | (Australia) | Eddy Bosnar | 1 | 0 | 0 | 0 | 0 | 0+1 | 0 | 0 | 0 | 0 | 0 | 0 | 0 | 0 | 0 |

- Last updated: 9 April 2016
- Source: au.soccerway.com
- (yellow card) = Number of bookings; (second yellow card) = Number of sending offs after a second yellow card; (red card) = Number of sending offs by a direct red card.

== Pre-season and friendlies ==
| 5 August 2015 | Central Coast Mariners | 2–1 | Newcastle Jets | Gosford |
| Wednesday | Bosnar; Fitzgerald | Report | | Stadium: Central Coast Stadium; Attendance: 0 (Behind closed doors) |

| 7 August 2015 | Western Sydney Wanderers | 2–3 | Central Coast Mariners | Coffs Harbour |
| Friday 19:00 AEST | Castelen 69'; Macdonald 77' | Report | Heffernan 52', 53', 56' | Stadium: C.ex Coffs International Stadium; Attendance: 3,248; Referee: Kris Griffiths-Jones |

| 18 August 2015 | Canberra Olympic | 2–3 | Central Coast Mariners | Canberra |
| Tuesday 18:00 AEST | Cattanach 69', 90' | Report | Austin 2'; Bentham 4'; Sim 49' | Stadium: Gungahlin Enclosed Oval |

| 20 August 2015 | Gungahlin United | 1–3 | Central Coast Mariners | Canberra |
| Thursday 19:00 AEST | Barac 16' | Report | O'Donovan 3', 6'; Bingham 71' | Stadium: Gungahlin Enclosed Oval |

| 10 September 2015 | Sydney FC | 1–3 | Central Coast Mariners | Sydney |
| Thursday | Ninković | | O'Donovan; J. Rose; Sim | Stadium: Leichhardt Oval; Attendance: 0 (Behind closed doors) |

| 14 September 2015 | Melbourne Victory | 3–0 | Central Coast Mariners | Melbourne |
| Monday 14:00 AEST | Georgievski 50'; Berisha 58', 60' | Report | | Stadium: AAMI Park; Attendance: 0 (Behind closed doors); Referee: Jonathan Barreiro |

| 17 September 2015 | Western NSW Mariners | 0–7 | Central Coast Mariners | Orange |
| Thursday 18:30 AEST | | Report | Heffernan 7', 32', 37'; Ascroft 9'; Ferreira 16' (pen.), 21'; Bingham 42' | Stadium: Wade Park |

| 20 September 2015 | Central Coast Mariners | 0–1 | Newcastle Jets | Orange |
| Sunday 15:00 AEST | | Report | Hoffman 53' | Stadium: Wade Park; Attendance: 2,142; Referee: Matthew Cropper |

| 26 September 2015 | Brisbane Roar | 3–1 | Central Coast Mariners | Sunshine Coast |
| Saturday 19:00 AEST | Brown 51'; Petratos 59'; Borrello 83' | Report | Fitzgerald 13' | Stadium: Sunshine Coast Stadium; Referee: Chris Beath |

== Competitions ==
=== Overview ===
| Competition | First match | Last match | Starting round | Final position | Record | | | | | | | |
| Competition | First match | Last match | Starting round | Final position | Pld | W | D | L | GF | GA | GD | Win % |
|---|---|---|---|---|---|---|---|---|---|---|---|---|
| A-League | 10 October 2015 | 9 April 2016 | Matchday 1 | 10th | 27 | 3 | 4 | 20 | 33 | 70 | −37 | 11.11 |
| FFA Cup | 15 August 2015 | | Round of 32 | Round of 32 | 1 | 0 | 0 | 1 | 0 | 1 | −1 | 0.00 |
| Total | | | | | 28 | 3 | 4 | 21 | 33 | 71 | −38 | 10.71 |

Source: Competitions

=== A-League ===
==== League table ====
| Pos | Team | Pld | W | D | L | GF | GA | GD | Pts | Qualification |
|---|---|---|---|---|---|---|---|---|---|---|
| 1 | Adelaide United (C) | 27 | 14 | 7 | 6 | 45 | 28 | +17 | 49 | Qualification for 2017 AFC Champions League group stage and Finals series |
| 2 | Western Sydney Wanderers | 27 | 14 | 6 | 7 | 44 | 33 | +11 | 48 | Qualification for 2017 AFC Champions League group stage and Finals series |
| 3 | Brisbane Roar | 27 | 14 | 6 | 7 | 49 | 40 | +9 | 48 | Qualification for 2017 AFC Champions League second preliminary round and Finals series |
| 4 | Melbourne City | 27 | 13 | 5 | 9 | 63 | 44 | +19 | 44 | Qualification for Finals series |
| 5 | Perth Glory | 27 | 13 | 4 | 10 | 49 | 42 | +7 | 43 | Qualification for Finals series |
| 6 | Melbourne Victory | 27 | 11 | 8 | 8 | 40 | 33 | +7 | 41 | Qualification for Finals series |
| 7 | Sydney FC | 27 | 8 | 10 | 9 | 36 | 36 | 0 | 34 | |
| 8 | Newcastle Jets | 27 | 8 | 6 | 13 | 28 | 41 | −13 | 30 | |
| 9 | Wellington Phoenix (Note: Wellington Phoenix cannot qualify for the AFC Champions League as they are not recognised as an AFC club.) | 27 | 7 | 4 | 16 | 34 | 54 | −20 | 25 | |
| 10 | Central Coast Mariners | 27 | 3 | 4 | 20 | 33 | 70 | −37 | 13 | |

Source: A-Leagues
Rules for classification: 1) points; 2) goal difference; 3) number of goals scored.
(C) Champions

==== Results summary ====
| Overall | | | | | | | | Home | | | | | | Away | | | | | |
| Pld | W | D | L | GF | GA | GD | Pts | W | D | L | GF | GA | GD | W | D | L | GF | GA | GD |
|---|---|---|---|---|---|---|---|---|---|---|---|---|---|---|---|---|---|---|---|
| 27 | 3 | 4 | 20 | 33 | 70 | −37 | 13 | 2 | 3 | 9 | 19 | 32 | −13 | 1 | 1 | 11 | 14 | 38 | −24 |

Last updated: 9 April 2016.
Source: ultimatealeague.com

==== Results by round ====
| Round | 1 | 2 | 3 | 4 | 5 | 6 | 7 | 8 | 9 | 10 | 11 | 12 | 13 | 14 | 15 | 16 | 17 | 18 | 19 | 20 | 21 | 22 | 23 | 24 | 25 | 26 | 27 |
|---|---|---|---|---|---|---|---|---|---|---|---|---|---|---|---|---|---|---|---|---|---|---|---|---|---|---|---|
| Ground | H | A | A | H | H | A | A | H | H | A | H | A | H | H | A | H | A | A | H | A | H | H | A | H | A | A | H |
| Result | W | L | L | L | D | D | L | L | L | L | L | L | W | D | L | L | W | L | L | L | L | L | L | D | L | L | L |
| Position | 2 | 4 | 8 | 9 | 8 | 8 | 8 | 8 | 9 | 10 | 10 | 10 | 10 | 10 | 10 | 10 | 10 | 10 | 10 | 10 | 10 | 10 | 10 | 10 | 10 | 10 | 10 |

Updated to match(es) played on 9 April 2016. Source: ultimatealeague.com
A = Away; H = Home; W = Win; D = Draw; L = Loss

==== Matches ====
| 10 October 2015 1 | Central Coast Mariners | 3–2 | Perth Glory | Gosford |
| Saturday 17:15 AEDT | O'Donovan 9'; F. Ferreira 58' (pen.), 67' (pen.) | Report | R. Garcia 23'; Sándor 90+3' | Stadium: Central Coast Stadium; Attendance: 8,073; Referee: Strebre Delovski |

| 18 October 2015 2 | Brisbane Roar | 2–1 | Central Coast Mariners | Brisbane |
| Sunday 16:00 AEST | Borrello 14', 60' | Report | Bingham 88' | Stadium: Suncorp Stadium; Attendance: 14,471; Referee: Ben Williams |

| 25 October 2015 3 | Melbourne City | 3–1 | Central Coast Mariners | Melbourne |
| Sunday 17:00 AEDT | Kisnorbo 11'; Fornaroli 53', 72' | Report | Fitzgerald 13' | Stadium: AAMI Park; Attendance: 8,408; Referee: Chris Beath |

| 31 October 2015 4 | Central Coast Mariners | 1–3 | Sydney FC | Gosford |
| Saturday 17:15 AEDT | O'Donovan 35'; Fitzgerald (yellow card) 40' (yellow-red card) 42' | Report | Smeltz 34'; Simon 82', 88' | Stadium: Central Coast Stadium; Attendance: 10,030; Referee: Adam Fielding |

| 8 November 2015 5 | Central Coast Mariners | 1–1 | Wellington Phoenix | Gosford |
| Sunday 17:00 AEDT | O'Donovan 76' | Report | McGlinchey 8' | Stadium: Central Coast Stadium; Attendance: 6,460; Referee: Chris Beath |

| 14 November 2015 6 | Newcastle Jets | 1–1 | Central Coast Mariners | Newcastle |
| Saturday 17:15 AEDT | Trifunović 83' | Report | McGing (red card) 24'; Sim 90+2' | Stadium: Hunter Stadium; Attendance: 9,422; Referee: Kris Griffiths-Jones |

| 19 November 2015 7 | Melbourne Victory | 2–1 | Central Coast Mariners | Melbourne |
| Thursday 20:00 AEDT | Finkler 16', 19' | Report | Sim 89' | Stadium: AAMI Park; Attendance: 16,669; Referee: Ben Williams |

| 29 November 2015 8 | Central Coast Mariners | 0–2 | Western Sydney Wanderers | Gosford |
| Sunday 17:00 AEDT | | Report | Šantalab 66'; Nichols 90+2' | Stadium: Central Coast Stadium; Attendance: 10,519; Referee: Alan Milliner |

| 3 December 2015 9 | Central Coast Mariners | 1–5 | Melbourne City | Gosford |
| Thursday 20:00 AEDT | Austin 86' (pen.) | Report | Novillo 26', 57'; Fornaroli 45'; Mauk 75'; Mooy 90+5' | Stadium: Central Coast Stadium; Attendance: 4,514; Referee: Strebre Delovski |

| 12 December 2015 10 | Perth Glory | 2–1 | Central Coast Mariners | Perth |
| Saturday 18:40 AWST | Marinković 62', 64' | Report | O'Donovan 28' | Stadium: nib Stadium; Attendance: 5,590; Referee: Ben Williams |

| 20 December 2015 11 | Central Coast Mariners | 0–1 | Brisbane Roar | Gosford |
| Sunday 17:00 AEDT | | Report | D. Petratos 85' | Stadium: Central Coast Stadium; Attendance: 5,124; Referee: Chris Beath |

| 26 December 2015 12 | Sydney FC | 4–1 | Central Coast Mariners | Sydney |
| Saturday 19:30 AEDT | Brosque 12', 24' (pen.); Tavares 30' (pen.); McGing 84' (o.g.) | Report | Izzo (yellow card) 23' (yellow-red card) 27' | Stadium: Allianz Stadium; Attendance: 12,648; Referee: Ben Williams |

| 31 December 2015 13 | Central Coast Mariners | 3–1 | Wellington Phoenix | Gosford |
| Thursday 19:00 AEDT | F. Ferreira 27' (pen.); Austin 30'; Neill 70' | Report | Powell 67' | Stadium: Central Coast Stadium; Attendance: 10,073; Referee: Kris Griffiths-Jones |

| 8 January 2016 14 | Central Coast Mariners | 3–3 | Melbourne Victory | Geelong |
| Friday 19:40 AEDT | Ascroft 12'; Bingham 30'; Austin 35' | Report | Berisha 60' (pen.), 90+2'; Thompson 66' | Stadium: Simonds Stadium; Attendance: 14,268; Referee: Peter Green |

| 16 January 2016 15 | Adelaide United | 3–1 | Central Coast Mariners | Adelaide |
| Saturday 16:45 ACDT | Goodwin 60'; Sánchez 80'; Dugandzic 90+2' | Report | F. Ferreria 67' | Stadium: Coopers Stadium; Attendance: 11,125; Referee: Matthew Conger |

| 23 January 2016 16 | Central Coast Mariners | 1–2 | Western Sydney Wanderers | Gosford |
| Saturday 19:30 AEDT | F. Ferreira 67'; Montgomery (red card) 79' | Report | Bridge 11'; Šantalab 87' | Stadium: Central Coast Stadium; Attendance: 13,105; Referee: Ben Williams |

| 30 January 2016 17 | Wellington Phoenix | 1–3 | Central Coast Mariners | Christchurch |
| Saturday 19:15 NZDT | Powell 90+2' | Report | L. García 50'; Roux 53'; Austin 85' | Stadium: AMI Stadium; Attendance: 8,545; Referee: Strebre Delovski |

| 6 February 2016 18 | Brisbane Roar | 4–0 | Central Coast Mariners | Brisbane |
| Saturday 16:15 AEST | North 20'; Maclaren 36'; Corona 59'; Henrique 72' (pen.) | Report | Ascroft (red card) 71' | Stadium: Suncorp Stadium; Attendance: 11,788; Referee: Matthew Conger |

| 14 February 2016 19 | Central Coast Mariners | 2–3 | Adelaide United | Gosford |
| Sunday 19:00 AEDT | F. Ferreira 32'; Bingham 90+4' | Report | Isaías 54'; Djite 66'; Mauk 90+2' | Stadium: Central Coast Stadium; Attendance: 5,096; Referee: Jarred Gillett |

| 21 February 2016 20 | Melbourne City | 4–1 | Central Coast Mariners | Melbourne |
| Sunday 17:00 AEDT | Kisnorbo 48'; Mooy 66' (pen.), 90+10'; Garuccio 69' | Report | Austin 34'; Ferreira (yellow card) 55' (yellow-red card) 85' | Stadium: AAMI Park; Attendance: 7,535; Referee: Stephen Lucas |

| 28 February 2015 21 | Central Coast Mariners | 0–1 | Newcastle Jets | Gosford |
| Sunday 17:00 AEDT | | Report | Ugarković 57' | Stadium: Central Coast Stadium; Attendance: 7,528; Referee: Ben Williams |

| 6 March 2016 22 | Central Coast Mariners | 0–2 | Melbourne Victory | Gosford |
| Sunday 17:00 AEDT | Neill (yellow card) 7' (yellow-red card) 48' | Report | Berisha 12'; Ben Khalfallah 90' | Stadium: Central Coast Stadium; Attendance: 5,032; Referee: Shaun Evans |

| 12 March 2016 23 | Perth Glory | 4–0 | Central Coast Mariners | Perth |
| Saturday 14:15 AWST | Castro 4' (pen.); Keogh 53', 67' (pen.); Harold 90+4' | Report | Austin (yellow card) 37' (yellow-red card) 49'; L. García (yellow card) 51' (yellow-red card) 54' | Stadium: nib Stadium; Attendance: 11,127; Referee: Adam Fielding |

| 19 March 2016 24 | Central Coast Mariners | 2–2 | Sydney FC | Gosford |
| Saturday 17:15 AEDT | O'Donovan 86'; Ascroft 90+1' | Report | Blackwood 11'; Smeltz 45' | Stadium: Central Coast Stadium; Attendance: 6,383; Referee: Koichiro Fukushima (Japan) |

| 27 March 2016 25 | Adelaide United | 4–2 | Central Coast Mariners | Adelaide |
| Sunday 16:30 ACDT | Isaías 29'; Mauk 35'; Djite 38'; Sánchez 81' (pen.) | Report | O'Donovan 16', 83' | Stadium: Coopers Stadium; Attendance: 10,269; Referee: Stephen Lucas |

| 1 April 2016 26 | Western Sydney Wanderers | 4–1 | Central Coast Mariners | Sydney |
| Friday 19:40 AEDT | Castelen 8'; Šantalab 36', 52'; Nichols 83' | Report | L. García 21' | Stadium: Pirtek Stadium; Attendance: 14,855; Referee: Chris Beath |

| 9 April 2016 27 | Central Coast Mariners | 2–4 | Newcastle Jets | Gosford |
| Saturday 17:15 AEST | F. Ferreira 51' (pen.); O'Donovan 76' | Report | Nordstrand 1', 54'; Alivodić 18'; Poljak 79' | Stadium: Central Coast Stadium; Attendance: 7,355; Referee: Jarred Gillett |

=== FFA Cup ===
| 11 August 2015 Round of 32 | Central Coast Mariners (New South Wales) | 0–1 | (New Zealand) Wellington Phoenix | Gosford |
| Tuesday 19:30 AEST | | Report | Appiah 17' | Stadium: Central Coast Stadium; Attendance: 6,111; Referee: Stephen Lucas |
