= 2016–17 Melbourne Victory FC season =

Melbourne Victory
2016–17 season
- Chairman: Anthony Di Pietro
- Manager: Kevin Muscat
- Stadium: AAMI Park & Etihad Stadium, Melbourne
- A-League: 2nd
- A-League Finals Series: Runners-up
- FFA Cup: Semi-finals
- Top goalscorer: League: Besart Berisha (19 goals); All: Besart Berisha (23 goals)
- Highest home attendance: 43,188 vs Melbourne City (15 October 2016)
- Lowest home attendance: 14,081 vs Newcastle Jets (2 January 2017)
- Average home league attendance: 22,008
Home colours	Away colours

The 2016–17 Melbourne Victory FC season was the club's 12th season since its establishment in 2004. The club participated in the A-League for the 12th time, and the FFA Cup for the third time.

== Players ==
=== Squad information ===
Note: Flags indicate national team as defined under FIFA eligibility rules; some limited exceptions apply. Players may hold more than one non-FIFA nationality.

No.	Pos.	Nation	Player
2	DF	AUS	Jason Geria
4	DF	AUS	Nick Ansell
5	DF	MKD	Daniel Georgievski
6	MF	AUS	Leigh Broxham (vice-captain)
7	MF	NZL	Marco Rojas
8	FW	KOS	Besart Berisha
10	FW	AUS	James Troisi
11	FW	AUS	Mitch Austin
14	FW	TUN	Fahid Ben Khalfallah
15	DF	ESP	Alan Baró

No.	Pos.	Nation	Player
16	MF	AUS	Rashid Mahazi
17	DF	AUS	James Donachie
20	GK	AUS	Lawrence Thomas
21	MF	AUS	Carl Valeri (Captain)
22	MF	AUS	Stefan Nigro
23	FW	NZL	Jai Ingham
27	GK	AUS	Alastair Bray
30	GK	AUS	Lucas Spinella
31	FW	AUS	Christian Theoharous (Scholarship)
40	GK	AUS	Matt Acton (Injury replacement)

=== From youth squad ===
N	Pos.	Nat.	Name	Age	Notes
22	MF	(Australia)	Stefan Nigro	19	2 year senior contact
31	FW	(Australia)	Christian Theoharous	17	2 year scholarship contract

=== Transfers in ===
No.	Position	Player	Transferred from	Type/fee	Contract length	Date	Ref
17	DF	James Donachie	Unattached	Free transfer	1 year	11 June 2016	
11	FW	Mitch Austin	Central Coast Mariners	Undisclosed Fee	1 year	17 June 2016	
15	DF	(Spain) Alan Baró	(Spain) Ponferradina	Free transfer	1 year	7 July 2016	
10	FW	James Troisi	Unattached	Free transfer	1 year	1 August 2016	
7	MF	(New Zealand) Marco Rojas	Unattached	Free transfer	2 years	25 August 2016	
27	GK	Alastair Bray	Unattached	Free transfer	1 year	23 September 2016	
9	FW	(Germany) Maximilian Beister	(Germany) Mainz 05	Loan	1 year	18 October 2016	
40	GK	Matt Acton	Unattached	Injury replacement loan	1 year	25 November 2016	

=== Transfers out ===
No.	Position	Player	Transferred to	Type/fee	Date	Ref
9	FW	(New Zealand) Kosta Barbarouses	Wellington Phoenix	Free transfer	8 March 2016	
7	MF	(Brazil) Guilherme Finkler	Wellington Phoenix	Free transfer	24 March 2016	
17	DF	(France) Matthieu Delpierre	Retired		26 April 2016	
10	FW	Archie Thompson	Unattached	Free transfer	30 April 2016	
15	DF	Giancarlo Gallifuoco	Unattached	Free transfer	28 May 2016	
18	DF	Dylan Murnane	Unattached	Undisclosed Fee	28 May 2016	
22	MF	Jesse Makarounas	Adelaide United	Free transfer	28 May 2016	
33	FW	Joey Katebian	Unattached	Undisclosed Fee	31 May 2016	
11	MF	Connor Pain	Central Coast Mariners	Undisclosed Fee	17 June 2016	
24	DF	Thomas Deng	(Netherlands) Jong PSV	Loan	28 June 2016	
1	GK	Danny Vukovic	Sydney FC	Free transfer	18 July 2016	
3	DF	Scott Galloway	Central Coast Mariners	Free transfer	19 October 2016	
25	MF	Sebastian Pasquali	(Netherlands) Jong Ajax	Undisclosed Fee	26 November 2016	
9	FW	(Germany) Maximilian Beister	(Germany) Mainz 05	Loan return	2 February 2017	
13	MF	Oliver Bozanic	(Japan) Ventforet Kofu	$3,250,000	16 March 2017	

=== Contact extensions ===
Name	Position	Duration	Contract Expiry	Notes
(Australia) Jason Geria	Right back	3 years	2020	
(Australia) Lawrence Thomas	Goalkeeper	1 year	2018	
(New Zealand) Jai Ingham	Winger	2 years	2019	
(Australia) Carl Valeri	Defensive midfielder	1 year	2018	

== Technical staff ==
Position	Name
Manager	(Australia) Kevin Muscat
Assistant manager	(Australia) Jean-Paul de Marigny
Goalkeeping coach	(Australia) Dean Anastasiadis
Youth Team Manager	(Australia) Gareth Naven
Youth Team Assistant Manager	(New Zealand) Vaughan Coveny
Youth Team Developmental Manager	(Scotland) Grant Brebner
Youth Goalkeeping Coach	Vacant
Strength & conditioning Coach	(Australia) Anthony Crea
Physiotherapist	(Australia) Travis Maude

== Statistics ==
=== Squad statistics ===
N	Pos.	Nat.	Name	Total					A-League					FFA Cup
N	Pos.	Nat.	Name	Apps	Goals	Yellow card	Second yellow card	Red card	Apps	Goals	Yellow card	Second yellow card	Red card	Apps	Goals	Yellow card	Second yellow card	Red card
2	DF	(Australia)	Jason Geria	30	0	10	0	0	27+0	0	9	0	0	3+0	0	1	0	0
4	DF	(Australia)	Nick Ansell	23	0	3	0	0	15+4	0	2	0	0	3+1	0	1	0	0
5	DF	(North Macedonia)	Daniel Georgievski	27	0	5	1	0	15+8	0	4	1	0	3+1	0	1	0	0
6	MF	(Australia)	Leigh Broxham	33	0	7	0	0	25+4	0	5	0	0	4+0	0	2	0	0
7	MF	(New Zealand)	Marco Rojas	27	13	0	0	0	24+1	12	0	0	0	2+0	1	0	0	0
8	FW	(Kosovo)	Besart Berisha	32	23	3	0	1	28+0	21	2	0	1	4+0	2	1	0	0
10	FW	(Australia)	James Troisi	28	7	7	0	0	25+1	6	7	0	0	2+0	1	0	0	0
11	FW	(Australia)	Mitch Austin	22	3	1	0	0	10+9	3	1	0	0	2+1	0	0	0	0
14	FW	(Tunisia)	Fahid Ben Khalfallah	27	2	7	0	0	20+3	2	7	0	0	3+1	0	0	0	0
15	DF	(Spain)	Alan Baró	30	0	10	0	1	26+0	0	8	0	1	4+0	0	2	0	0
16	MF	(Australia)	Rashid Mahazi	16	0	4	0	0	5+8	0	3	0	0	1+2	0	1	0	0
17	DF	(Australia)	James Donachie	24	1	2	0	1	17+6	1	2	0	1	1+0	0	0	0	0
19	FW	(Australia)	George Howard	3	1	1	0	0	1+1	0	1	0	0	0+1	1	0	0	0
20	GK	(Australia)	Lawrence Thomas	32	0	2	0	0	28+0	0	2	0	0	4+0	0	0	0	0
21	MF	(Australia)	Carl Valeri	30	0	8	0	0	27+0	0	6	0	0	3+0	0	2	0	0
22	MF	(Australia)	Stefan Nigro	5	0	1	0	0	2+3	0	1	0	0	0+0	0	0	0	0
23	FW	(New Zealand)	Jai Ingham	23	1	2	0	0	4+17	1	2	0	0	1+1	0	0	0	0
27	GK	(Australia)	Alastair Bray	0	0	0	0	0	0+0	0	0	0	0	0+0	0	0	0	0
30	GK	(Australia)	Lucas Spinella	0	0	0	0	0	0+0	0	0	0	0	0+0	0	0	0	0
31	FW	(Australia)	Christian Theoharous	1	0	0	0	0	0+1	0	0	0	0	0+0	0	0	0	0
32	MF	(Australia)	Cameron McGilp	1	0	0	0	0	0+1	0	0	0	0	0+0	0	0	0	0
35	MF	(Australia)	Josh Hope	0	0	0	0	0	0+0	0	0	0	0	0+0	0	0	0	0
40	GK	(Australia)	Matt Acton	1	0	0	0	0	1+0	0	0	0	0	0+0	0	0	0	0
Players no longer at the club:
3	DF	(Australia)	Scott Galloway	1	0	0	0	0	0+0	0	0	0	0	1+0	0	0	0	0
9	FW	(Germany)	Maximilian Beister	9	1	0	0	0	1+8	1	0	0	0	0+0	0	0	0	0
13	MF	(Australia)	Oliver Bozanic	25	2	1	0	0	18+3	1	1	0	0	3+1	1	0	0	0
25	MF	(Australia)	Sebastian Pasquali	4	0	0	0	0	0+2	0	0	0	0	0+2	0	0	0	0

- Last updated: 7 May 2017
- Source: au.soccerway.com
- (yellow card) = Number of bookings; (second yellow card) = Number of sending offs after a second yellow card; (red card) = Number of sending offs by a direct red card.

== Pre-season and friendlies ==
23 July 2016 International Champions Cup	Melbourne Victory (Australia)	1–1 (4–3 p)	(Italy) Juventus	Melbourne, Australia
19:00 AEST	J. Ingham 83'	Report	Blanco 58'	Stadium: MCG; Referee: Hiroyuki Kimura (Japan)
	Penalties
	Valeri (penalty missed); J. Ingham (penalty scored); Baró (penalty scored); Galloway (penalty scored); Pasquali (penalty scored)		(penalty scored) Marrone; (penalty scored) Vitale; (penalty missed) Macek; (penalty scored) Rosseti; (penalty missed) Padovan

31 July 2016	Melbourne Victory (Australia)	1–0	(Spain) Atlético Madrid	Geelong, Australia
14:00 AEST	Ansell 44'	Report		Stadium: Simonds Stadium; Attendance: 16,652; Referee: Alan Milliner (Australia)

9 August 2016	Port Melbourne (Australia)	0–6	(Australia) Melbourne Victory	Melbourne, Australia
19:30 AEST		Report	Austin 7'; J. Ingham 23'; Bozanic 49'; Berisha 53'; Howard 67'; Theoharous 86'	Stadium: JL Murphy Reserve

7 September 2016	Melbourne Victory (Australia)	3–1	(Australia) Sydney FC	Melbourne, Australia
	Berisha 16' (pen.); Rojas 36'; Austin 69'	Report	O'Neill 19'	Stadium: AAMI Park; Attendance: 0 (behind closed doors)

14 September 2016	Adelaide United (Australia)	0–1	(Australia) Melbourne Victory	Adelaide, Australia
14:30 ACST		Report	Rojas 9'	Stadium: Coopers Stadium; Attendance: 0 (behind closed doors)

== Competitions ==
=== Overview ===
Competition	First match	Last match	Starting round	Final position	Record							
Competition	First match	Last match	Starting round	Final position	Pld	W	D	L	GF	GA	GD	Win %
A-League	7 October 2016	14 April 2017	Matchday 1	2nd	27	15	4	8	49	31	+18	55.56
A-League Finals	30 April 2017	7 May 2017	Elimination-finals	Elimination-finals	2	1	1	0	2	1	+1	50.00
FFA Cup	2 August 2016	30 November 2016	Round of 32	Semi-finals	4	3	0	1	6	3	+3	75.00
Total					33	19	5	9	57	35	+22	57.58

Source: Competitions

=== A-League ===
==== League table ====
Pos	Team	Pld	W	D	L	GF	GA	GD	Pts	Qualification
1	Sydney FC (C)	27	20	6	1	55	12	+43	66	Qualification for 2018 AFC Champions League group stage and Finals series
2	Melbourne Victory	27	15	4	8	49	31	+18	49	Qualification for 2018 AFC Champions League group stage and Finals series
3	Brisbane Roar	27	11	9	7	43	37	+6	42	Qualification for 2018 AFC Champions League second preliminary round and Finals series
4	Melbourne City	27	11	6	10	49	44	+5	39	Qualification for Finals series
5	Perth Glory	27	10	9	8	53	53	0	39	Qualification for Finals series
6	Western Sydney Wanderers	27	8	12	7	35	35	0	36	Qualification for Finals series
7	Wellington Phoenix (Note: Wellington Phoenix cannot qualify for the AFC Champions League as they are not recognised as an AFC club.)	27	8	6	13	41	46	−5	30	
8	Central Coast Mariners	27	6	5	16	31	52	−21	23	
9	Adelaide United	27	5	8	14	25	46	−21	23	
10	Newcastle Jets	27	5	7	15	28	53	−25	22	

Source: A-Leagues
Rules for classification: 1) points; 2) goal difference; 3) number of goals scored.
(C) Champions

==== Results summary ====
Overall								Home						Away					
Pld	W	D	L	GF	GA	GD	Pts	W	D	L	GF	GA	GD	W	D	L	GF	GA	GD
27	15	4	8	49	31	+18	49	10	1	3	34	19	+15	5	3	5	15	12	+3

Last updated: 14 April 2017.
Source: ultimatealeague.com

==== Results by round ====
Round	1	2	3	4	5	6	7	8	9	10	11	12	13	14	15	16	17	18	19	20	21	22	23	24	25	26	27
Ground	A	H	A	H	A	H	A	H	H	A	A	H	H	A	H	A	H	H	A	A	H	A	H	A	H	A	H
Result	D	L	W	W	L	W	L	W	D	W	W	W	W	W	W	L	L	W	D	W	W	L	W	L	L	D	W
Position	5	7	5	3	5	4	5	3	3	3	2	2	2	2	2	2	2	2	2	2	2	2	2	2	2	2	2

Updated to match(es) played on 14 April 2017. Source: ultimatealeague.com
A = Away; H = Home; W = Win; D = Draw; L = Loss

==== Matches ====
7 October 2016 1	Brisbane Roar	1–1	Melbourne Victory	Brisbane
18:50 AEST	DeVere 90+6'	Report	Austin 83'	Stadium: Suncorp Stadium; Attendance: 15,805; Referee: Shaun Evans

15 October 2016 2	Melbourne Victory	1–4	Melbourne City	Melbourne
19:50 AEDT	Rojas 62'	Report	Cahill 27'; Fornaroli 31'; Brattan 52'; Brandán 63'	Stadium: Etihad Stadium; Attendance: 43,188; Referee: Chris Beath

22 October 2016 3	Adelaide United	1–2	Melbourne Victory	Adelaide
19:20 ACDT	Elrich 68'	Report	Berisha 20'; Rojas 90+3'	Stadium: Coopers Stadium; Attendance: 14,908; Referee: Peter Green

31 October 2016 4	Melbourne Victory	6–1	Wellington Phoenix	Melbourne
19:50 AEDT	Berisha 20' (pen.), 22' (pen.), 82'; Rojas 71', 77'; Austin 90+2'	Report	Krishna 63' (pen.)	Stadium: Etihad Stadium; Attendance: 20,113; Referee: Alan Milliner

5 November 2016 5	Sydney FC	2–1	Melbourne Victory	Sydney
19:50 AEDT	Carney 63', 78'	Report	Austin 41'	Stadium: Allianz Stadium; Attendance: 19,143; Referee: Chris Beath

12 November 2016 6	Melbourne Victory	3–0	Western Sydney Wanderers	Melbourne
19:50 AEDT	Bozanic 26'; J. Ingham 65'; Beister 85'	Report		Stadium: Etihad Stadium; Attendance: 21,480; Referee: Jarred Gillett

26 November 2016 8	Melbourne Victory	2–0	Newcastle Jets	Melbourne
17:35 AEDT	Fyfe 52' (o.g.); Rojas 54'	Report		Stadium: AAMI Park; Attendance: 18,267; Referee: Alan Milliner

2 December 2016 9	Melbourne Victory	1–1	Perth Glory	Melbourne
19:50 AEDT	Berisha 41'	Report	Keogh 17'	Stadium: AAMI Park; Attendance: 16,017; Referee: Chris Beath

10 December 2016 10	Western Sydney Wanderers	0–3	Melbourne Victory	Sydney
19:50 AEDT		Report	Berisha 32', 66', 82'	Stadium: ANZ Stadium; Attendance: 16,231; Referee: Chris Beath

17 December 2016 11	Melbourne City	1–2	Melbourne Victory	Melbourne
19:50 AEDT	Cahill 16'	Report	Rojas 24'; Berisha 78'	Stadium: AAMI Park; Attendance: 24,706; Referee: Jarred Gillett

28 December 2016 12	Melbourne Victory	4–1	Central Coast Mariners	Melbourne
19:50 AEDT	McGing 28' (o.g.); Donachie 51'; Rojas 58', 59'	Report	Buhagiar 89'	Stadium: AAMI Park; Attendance: 20,491; Referee: Adam Fielding

2 January 2017 13	Melbourne Victory	4–2	Newcastle Jets	Geelong
19:50 AEDT	Berisha 30' (pen.); Rojas 35'; Ben Khalfallah 60'; Troisi 69'	Report	Ma 61'; Valeri 76' (o.g.)	Stadium: Simonds Stadium; Attendance: 14,081; Referee: Chris Beath

7 January 2017 14	Adelaide United	0–2	Melbourne Victory	Adelaide
19:20 ACDT		Report	Troisi 22'; Berisha 68'	Stadium: Coopers Stadium; Attendance: 10,036; Referee: Adam Fielding

13 January 2017 15	Melbourne Victory	3–2	Brisbane Roar	Melbourne
19:50 AEDT	Troisi 12'; Rojas 17'; Berisha 27' (pen.)	Report	Petratos 30'; Donachie 41' (o.g.)	Stadium: AAMI Park; Attendance: 21,103; Referee: Chris Beath

17 January 2017 7	Wellington Phoenix	3–0	Melbourne Victory	Wellington
19:45 NZDT	Bonevacia 33'; Tratt 89'; Barbarouses 90+3'	Report		Stadium: Westpac Stadium; Attendance: 5,865; Referee: Kris Griffiths-Jones

21 January 2017 16	Perth Glory	2–1	Melbourne Victory	Perth
17:00 AWST	Marinković 77'; Taggart 84'	Report	Berisha 58' (pen.)	Stadium: nib Stadium; Attendance: 11,271; Referee: Peter Green

26 January 2017 17	Melbourne Victory	1–2	Sydney FC	Melbourne
19:50 AEDT	Troisi 18'	Report	Hološko 38'; Ibini 65'	Stadium: Etihad Stadium; Attendance: 30,262; Referee: Jarred Gillett

4 February 2017 18	Melbourne Victory	2–1	Melbourne City	Melbourne
19:50 AEDT	Berisha 84'; Muscat 86' (o.g.)	Report	Baró 70' (o.g.)	Stadium: Etihad Stadium; Attendance: 35,426; Referee: Chris Beath

13 February 2017 19	Newcastle Jets	0–0	Melbourne Victory	Newcastle
19:50 AEDT		Report		Stadium: McDonald Jones Stadium; Attendance: 6,233; Referee: Stephen Lucas

19 February 2017 20	Central Coast Mariners	0–3	Melbourne Victory	Gosford
17:00 AEDT		Report	Berisha 25', 90+1'; Troisi 58'	Stadium: Central Coast Stadium; Attendance: 7,013; Referee: Daniel Elder

25 February 2017 21	Melbourne Victory	2–1	Adelaide United	Melbourne
19:50 AEDT	Rojas 66'; Berisha 82'	Report	Elrich 90'	Stadium: AAMI Park; Attendance: 19,035; Referee: Matthew Conger

3 March 2017 22	Sydney FC	1–0	Melbourne Victory	Sydney
19:50 AEDT	Bobô 50'	Report		Stadium: Allianz Stadium; Attendance: 13,310; Referee: Peter Green

11 March 2017 23	Melbourne Victory	4–1	Perth Glory	Melbourne
19:50 AEDT	Berisha 23'; Ben Khalfallah 42'; Rojas 48'; Troisi 74'	Report	Castro 5'	Stadium: AAMI Park; Attendance: 16,814; Referee: Kurt Ams

25 March 2017 24	Brisbane Roar	1–0	Melbourne Victory	Brisbane
18:50 AEST	Maclaren 51'	Report		Stadium: Suncorp Stadium; Attendance: 13,576; Referee: Matthew Conger

2 April 2017 25	Melbourne Victory	0–3	Wellington Phoenix	Melbourne
17:00 AEST		Report	Bonevacia 9', 26'; Smeltz 90'	Stadium: AAMI Park; Attendance: 17,011; Referee: Jarred Gillett

8 April 2017 26	Western Sydney Wanderers	0–0	Melbourne Victory	Sydney
18:50 AEST		Report		Stadium: ANZ Stadium; Attendance: 16,345; Referee: Peter Green

14 April 2017 27	Melbourne Victory	1–0	Central Coast Mariners	Melbourne
19:50 AEST	Berisha 80'	Report		Stadium: AAMI Park; Attendance: 14,827; Referee: Jarred Gillett

==== Finals series ====
30 April 2017 Semi-final	Melbourne Victory	1–0	Brisbane Roar	Melbourne
17:00 AEST	Berisha 70'	Report		Stadium: AAMI Park; Attendance: 20,202; Referee: Kris Griffiths-Jones

7 May 2017 Grand Final	Sydney FC	1–1 (a.e.t.) (4–2 p)	Melbourne Victory	Sydney
17:00 AEST	Grant 69'	Report	Berisha 20'	Stadium: Allianz Stadium; Attendance: 41,546; Referee: Jarred Gillett
	Penalties
	Brosque (penalty scored); Wilkinson (penalty missed); Carney (penalty scored); O'Neill (penalty scored); Ninković (penalty scored)		(penalty scored) Troisi; (penalty scored) Broxham; (penalty missed) Valeri; (penalty missed) Rojas

=== FFA Cup ===
3 August 2016 Round of 32	Newcastle Jets (New South Wales)	1–3	(Victoria (state)) Melbourne Victory	Newcastle
19:30 AEST	W. Brown 50'	Report	Berisha 5'; Bozanic 54' (pen.); Howard 87'	Stadium: Magic Park; Attendance: 1,956; Referee: Alan Milliner

24 August 2016 Round of 16	Hume City (Victoria (state))	0–1	(Victoria (state)) Melbourne Victory	Melbourne
19:30 AEST		Report	Berisha 27' (pen.)	Stadium: ABD Stadium; Attendance: 2,866; Referee: Shaun Evans

27 September 2016 Quarter-final	Bentleigh Greens (Victoria (state))	0–2	(Victoria (state)) Melbourne Victory	Melbourne
19:30 AEST		Report	Rojas 64'; Troisi 68'	Stadium: Kingston Heath Soccer Complex; Attendance: 3,754; Referee: Alan Milliner

25 October 2016 Semi-final	Melbourne Victory (Victoria (state))	0–2	(Victoria (state)) Melbourne City	Melbourne
19:30 AEDT		Report	Brattan 9'; Brandán 77'	Stadium: AAMI Park; Attendance: 15,791; Referee: Shaun Evans
