= 2015–16 A-League =

39th season of top-tier soccer league in Australia

A-League
- Season: 2015–16
- Dates: 8 October 2015 – 1 May 2016
- Champions: Adelaide United (1st title)
- Premiers: Adelaide United (2nd title)
- Champions League: Adelaide United; Western Sydney Wanderers; Brisbane Roar
- Matches: 135
- Goals: 421 (3.12 per match)
- Top goalscorer: Bruno Fornaroli (25 goals)
- Best goalkeeper: Thomas Sørensen
- Biggest home win: Brisbane Roar 5–0 Melbourne Victory (12 March 2016)
- Biggest away win: Newcastle Jets 1–6 Perth Glory (24 January 2016)
- Highest scoring: Perth Glory 6–3 Brisbane Roar (20 February 2016)
- Longest winning run: Western Sydney Wanderers (7 games)
- Longest unbeaten run: Adelaide United (14 games)
- Longest winless run: Central Coast Mariners; Sydney FC (11 games)
- Longest losing run: Central Coast Mariners (6 games)
- Highest attendance: 40,539; Sydney FC vs. Western Sydney Wanderers (24 October 2015)
- Lowest attendance: 4,514; Central Coast Mariners vs. Melbourne City (3 December 2015)
- Average attendance: 12,309 ( 205)

The 2015–16 A-League was the 39th season of top-flight soccer in Australia, and the 11th since the establishment of the A-League in 2004. Melbourne Victory were both the defending A-League Premiers and Champions. The regular season schedule was released on 29 June 2015. The season commenced on 8 October 2015 and concluded on 10 April 2016. The finals series commenced on 15 April 2016 and concluded with the 2016 Grand Final, held on 1 May 2016.

The 2016 Grand Final took place on 1 May 2016, with Adelaide United claiming their first Championship with a 3–1 win against Western Sydney Wanderers.

== Clubs ==

Team	City	Home Ground	Capacity
Adelaide United	Adelaide	Coopers Stadium	17,000
Brisbane Roar	Brisbane	Suncorp Stadium	52,500
Central Coast Mariners	Gosford	Central Coast Stadium	20,119
Melbourne City	Melbourne	AAMI Park	30,050
Melbourne Victory	Melbourne	Etihad Stadium; AAMI Park	56,347; 30,050
Newcastle Jets	Newcastle	Hunter Stadium	33,000
Perth Glory	Perth	nib Stadium	20,500
Sydney FC	Sydney	Allianz Stadium	45,500
Wellington Phoenix	Wellington	Westpac Stadium	34,500
Western Sydney Wanderers	Sydney	Pirtek Stadium	21,487

=== Personnel and kits ===
Team	Manager	Captain	Kit manufacturer	Kit partner
Adelaide United	(Spain) Guillermo Amor	(Australia) Eugene Galekovic	Kappa	Veolia
Brisbane Roar	(Australia) John Aloisi	(Australia) Matt McKay	Umbro	Steadfast
Central Coast Mariners	(England) Tony Walmsley	(Scotland) Nick Montgomery	Kappa	Masterfoods
Melbourne City	(Netherlands) John van 't Schip	(Australia) Patrick Kisnorbo	Nike	Etihad
Melbourne Victory	(Australia) Kevin Muscat	(Australia) Carl Valeri	Adidas	Community Training Initiatives (h); Oliana Foods (a)
Newcastle Jets	(Australia) Scott Miller	(Australia) Nigel Boogaard	BLK	Beechwood Homes (h); Inspirations Paints (a)
Perth Glory	(England) Kenny Lowe	(Australia) Richard Garcia	Macron	QBE Insurance
Sydney FC	(Australia) Graham Arnold	(Australia) Alex Brosque	Puma	The Star
Wellington Phoenix	(Scotland) Ernie Merrick	(New Zealand) Andrew Durante	Adidas	Huawei
Western Sydney Wanderers	(Australia) Tony Popovic	(Australia) Nikolai Topor-Stanley	Nike	NRMA Insurance

- Additionally, referee kits are made by Umbro.

=== Managerial changes ===
Team	Outgoing manager	Manner of departure	Date of vacancy	Table	Incoming manager	Date of appointment
Brisbane Roar	(Netherlands) Frans Thijssen	Resigned	26 May 2015	Pre-season	(Australia) John Aloisi	26 May 2015
Newcastle Jets	(Australia) Phil Stubbins	Sacked	26 May 2015	Pre-season	(Australia) Scott Miller	18 June 2015
Adelaide United	(Spain) Josep Gombau	Resigned	24 July 2015	Pre-season	(Spain) Guillermo Amor	24 July 2015

=== Foreign players ===
Club	Visa 1	Visa 2	Visa 3	Visa 4	Visa 5	Non-Visa foreigner(s)	Former player(s)
Adelaide United	(Argentina) Marcelo Carrusca	(Italy) Iacopo La Rocca	(Spain) Sergio Cirio	(Spain) Isaías	(Spain) Pablo Sánchez		
Brisbane Roar	(Costa Rica) Jean Carlos Solórzano	(Germany) Thomas Broich	(Germany) Jérome Polenz	(Spain) Corona	(Spain) Javier Hervás	(Brazil) Henrique^{1} (England) Jamie Young^{2} (Sri Lanka) Jack Hingert^{2}	
Central Coast Mariners	(England) Daniel Heffernan	(Republic of Ireland) Roy O'Donovan	(Portugal) Fábio Ferreira	(Scotland) Nick Montgomery	(Spain) Luis García	(England) Mitch Austin^{1} (New Zealand) Storm Roux^{2} (Papua New Guinea) Brad McDonald^{2}	
Melbourne City	(Denmark) Thomas Sørensen	(Martinique) Harry Novillo	(Northern Ireland) Aaron Hughes	(Uruguay) Bruno Fornaroli		(Sri Lanka) Wade Dekker^{2}	(Slovenia) Robert Koren
Melbourne Victory	(Albania) Besart Berisha	(Brazil) Guilherme Finkler	(France) Matthieu Delpierre	(New Zealand) Kosta Barbarouses	(Tunisia) Fahid Ben Khalfallah	(North Macedonia) Daniel Georgievski^{2}	
Newcastle Jets	(Brazil) Leonardo	(Croatia) Mateo Poljak	(Denmark) Morten Nordstrand	(Serbia) Enver Alivodić			(Serbia) Miloš Trifunović (South Korea) Lee Ki-je
Perth Glory	(Hungary) György Sándor	(Republic of Ireland) Andy Keogh	(Serbia) Nebojša Marinković	(Spain) Diego Castro		(Hungary) Krisztián Vadócz^{3}	(Brazil) Sidnei (Netherlands) Guyon Fernandez
Sydney FC	(Senegal) Jacques Faty	(Senegal) Mickaël Tavares	(Serbia) Miloš Dimitrijević	(Serbia) Miloš Ninković	(Slovakia) Filip Hološko	(Croatia) Vedran Janjetović^{1} (Iraq) Ali Abbas^{1} (New Zealand) Shane Smeltz^{2}	
Wellington Phoenix	(Curaçao) Roly Bonevacia	(Fiji) Roy Krishna	(Spain) Albert Riera	(Spain) Alex Rodriguez		(Malta) Manny Muscat^{2}	(Netherlands) Jeffrey Sarpong
Western Sydney Wanderers	(Italy) Federico Piovaccari	(Netherlands) Romeo Castelen	(Spain) Alberto	(Spain) Andreu	(Spain) Dimas		

The following do not fill a Visa position:
^{1}Those players who were born and started their professional career abroad but have since gained Australian citizenship (and New Zealand citizenship, in the case of Wellington Phoenix);
^{2}Australian citizens (and New Zealand citizens, in the case of Wellington Phoenix) who have chosen to represent another national team;
^{3}Injury Replacement Players, or National Team Replacement Players;
^{4}Guest Players (eligible to play a maximum of fourteen games)

=== Salary cap exemptions and captains ===
Club	First Marquee	Second Marquee	Mature Age Rookie	Loyalty Players	Captain	Vice-Captain
Adelaide United	(Australia) Eugene Galekovic	(Argentina) Marcelo Carrusca	None	None	(Australia) Eugene Galekovic	(Australia) Bruce Djite
Brisbane Roar	(Australia) Matt McKay	(Germany) Thomas Broich	None	None	(Australia) Matt McKay	(Australia) Shane Stefanutto
Central Coast Mariners	(Spain) Luis García	None	None	None	(Scotland) Nick Montgomery	None
Melbourne City	(Australia) Aaron Mooy	None	(Australia) Wade Dekker	None	(Australia) Patrick Kisnorbo	None
Melbourne Victory	(Australia) Oliver Bozanic	(Albania) Besart Berisha	(Australia) Jai Ingham	(Australia) Archie Thompson	(Australia) Carl Valeri	(Australia) Leigh Broxham
Newcastle Jets	None	None	None	None	(Australia) Nigel Boogaard	(Croatia) Mateo Poljak
Perth Glory	(Spain) Diego Castro	(Australia) Michael Thwaite	None	None	(Australia) Richard Garcia	None
Sydney FC	(Australia) Alex Brosque	(Slovakia) Filip Hološko	(Australia) Alex Mullen	None	(Australia) Alex Brosque	(New Zealand) Shane Smeltz (Senegal) Jacques Faty
Wellington Phoenix	None	None	(Australia) Troy Danaskos	None	(New Zealand) Andrew Durante	(New Zealand) Ben Sigmund
Western Sydney Wanderers	(Australia) Dario Vidošić	(Italy) Federico Piovaccari	None	None	(Australia) Nikolai Topor-Stanley	(Australia) Mark Bridge

The following concessions to the salary cap were introduced for this season:

- A Loyalty allowance on a sliding scale for players who have played 5 years at the same club. Maximum $200,000 for 10 years.
- A Mature Aged Rookie over the age of 21 who has not played in a fully professional league for the last 18 months and last played football in Australia.
- Each Club can pay three players who started their careers with the club outside the Salary Cap. This season the total has been lifted from $150,000 to $200,000.
- The two Marquee Players (which sit outside the Salary Cap) can be two foreigners.
- Salary Cap Banking will allow clubs to carry over money not spent inside the Salary Cap in the previous two seasons to the following season, up to 105% of the Salary Cap in the relevant contract year.

== Regular season ==
=== League table ===
Pos	Team	Pld	W	D	L	GF	GA	GD	Pts	Qualification
1	Adelaide United (C)	27	14	7	6	45	28	+17	49	Qualification for 2017 AFC Champions League group stage and Finals series
2	Western Sydney Wanderers	27	14	6	7	44	33	+11	48	Qualification for 2017 AFC Champions League group stage and Finals series
3	Brisbane Roar	27	14	6	7	49	40	+9	48	Qualification for 2017 AFC Champions League second preliminary round and Finals series
4	Melbourne City	27	13	5	9	63	44	+19	44	Qualification for Finals series
5	Perth Glory	27	13	4	10	49	42	+7	43	Qualification for Finals series
6	Melbourne Victory	27	11	8	8	40	33	+7	41	Qualification for Finals series
7	Sydney FC	27	8	10	9	36	36	0	34	
8	Newcastle Jets	27	8	6	13	28	41	−13	30	
9	Wellington Phoenix (Note: Wellington Phoenix cannot qualify for the AFC Champions League as they are not recognised as an AFC club.)	27	7	4	16	34	54	−20	25	
10	Central Coast Mariners	27	3	4	20	33	70	−37	13	

Source: A-Leagues
Rules for classification: 1) points; 2) goal difference; 3) number of goals scored.
(C) Champions

=== Results ===
Home \ Away	ADE	BRI	CCM	MBC	MVC	NEW	PER	SYD	WEL	WSW	ADE	BRI	CCM	MBC	MVC	NEW	PER	SYD	WEL	WSW
Adelaide United		3–0	3–1	2–4	0–0	0–0	1–0	2–1	3–0	1–1			4–2	0–1		1–0		2–2		
Brisbane Roar	3–0		2–1	1–1	5–0	2–2	1–0	3–2	2–1	3–2	1–4		4–0	3–1		2–1	2–1			
Central Coast Mariners	2–3	0–1		1–5	3–3	0–1	3–2	1–3	1–1	0–2					0–2	2–4		2–2	3–1	1–2
Melbourne City	0–2	3–1	3–1		2–1	2–3	5–1	2–2	3–1	0–3			4–1		2–2			3–0	3–0	3–2
Melbourne Victory	2–1	4–0	2–1	3–2		1–1	1–1	1–0	3–0	1–1	0–1	0–0						1–1		2–0
Newcastle Jets	0–0	1–1	1–1	0–4	1–0		1–6	0–1	3–1	1–2				2–1	0–1		1–2		3–2	0–1
Perth Glory	3–1	6–3	2–1	2–2	1–0	2–0		0–0	1–2	2–2	1–3		4–0	3–2	3–2					
Sydney FC	0–2	0–0	4–1	1–1	2–4	1–0	1–2		0–0	1–0		1–3				2–0	4–0		1–3	1–1
Wellington Phoenix	4–2	3–2	1–3	2–1	2–0	1–2	0–1	1–1		0–2	0–4	0–0			1–4		1–2			
Western Sydney Wanderers	0–0	1–3	4–1	4–3	2–0	2–0	1–0	1–2	2–1		0–0	2–1					2–1		2–5	

Updated to match(es) played on 10 April 2016. Source: aleague.com.au
Legend: Blue = home team win; Yellow = draw; Red = away team win.

== Finals series ==
The Grand Final winner (Champion) qualified for the 2017 AFC Champions League group stage

Elimination-finals
Melbourne City	2
Perth Glory	0
Brisbane Roar	2
Melbourne Victory	1

Semi-finals
Adelaide United	4
Melbourne City	1
Western Sydney Wanderers (a.e.t.)	5
Brisbane Roar	4

Grand Final
Adelaide United	3
Western Sydney Wanderers	1

=== Elimination-finals ===
15 April 2016
19:30 AEST

Brisbane Roar	2–1	Melbourne Victory
McKay 88'; Broich 90+3'	Report	Berisha 86'

Suncorp Stadium, Brisbane
Attendance: 20,157
Referee: Jarred Gillett

17 April 2016
17:00 AEST

Melbourne City	2–0	Perth Glory
Fornaroli 40', 76'	Report

AAMI Park, Melbourne
Attendance: 11,273
Referee: Chris Beath

=== Semi-finals ===
22 April 2016
19:00 ACST

Adelaide United	4–1	Melbourne City
Djite 48', 60' (pen.); McGowan 88'; Sánchez 90+4'	Report	Fitzgerald 72'

Coopers Stadium, Adelaide
Attendance: 15,489
Referee: Strebre Delovski

24 April 2016
16:30 AEST

Western Sydney Wanderers	5–4 (a.e.t.)	Brisbane Roar
Castelen 26', 53', 59'; Šantalab 39'; Vidošić 102'	Report	D. Petratos 16' (pen.); Andreu 20' (o.g.); Maclaren 23', 81'

Pirtek Stadium, Parramatta
Attendance: 20,084
Referee: Peter Green

=== Grand Final ===
1 May 2016
15:30 ACST

Adelaide United	3–1	Western Sydney Wanderers
Kamau 21'; Isaías 32'; Sánchez 89'	Report	Neville 58'

Adelaide Oval, Adelaide
Attendance: 50,119
Referee: Jarred Gillett

== Statistics ==
=== Attendances ===
==== By club ====
These are the attendance records of each of the teams at the end of the home and away season. The table does not include finals series attendances.

As of matches played on 10 April 2016.

Team	Hosted	Average	High	Low	Total
Melbourne Victory	13	23,112	40,217	14,383	300,452
Sydney FC	14	16,071	40,539	8,717	224,999
Western Sydney Wanderers	13	14,297	19,627	9,860	185,866
Brisbane Roar	14	12,850	17,696	5,162	179,895
Adelaide United	13	11,287	19,079	6,205	146,736
Melbourne City	14	11,047	25,738	5,953	154,657
Newcastle Jets	14	9,586	14,886	7,210	134,202
Perth Glory	13	8,986	14,504	5,398	116,824
Central Coast Mariners	14	8,111	14,268	4,514	113,560
Wellington Phoenix	13	8,042	13,654	5,103	104,551
League total	135	12,309	40,539	4,514	1,661,742

==== By round ====
2015–16 A-League Attendance
Round	Total	Games	Avg. Per Game
Round 1	64,580	5	12,916
Round 2	84,448	5	16,890
Round 3	72,865	5	14,573
Round 4	67,074	5	13,415
Round 5	48,233	5	9,647
Round 6	58,681	5	11,736
Round 7	58,931	5	11,786
Round 8	59,295	5	11,859
Round 9	40,586	5	8,117
Round 10	46,988	5	9,398
Round 11	53,104	5	10,621
Round 12	73,423	5	14,685
Round 13	63,085	5	12,617
Round 14	55,954	5	11,191
Round 15	68,565	5	13,713
Round 16	76,749	5	15,350
Round 17	58,838	5	11,768
Round 18	63,419	5	12,684
Round 19	64,364	5	12,873
Round 20	86,207	5	17,241
Round 21	59,582	5	11,916
Round 22	44,628	5	8,926
Round 23	63,679	5	12,736
Round 24	49,476	5	9,895
Round 25	62,727	5	12,545
Round 26	58,268	5	11,654
Round 27	57,681	5	11,536
Elimination Final	31,430	2	15,715
Semi Final	35,573	2	17,787
Grand Final	50,119	1	50,119

=== Club membership ===
2015–16 A-League membership figures
Club	Members
Adelaide United	8,750
Brisbane Roar	5,347
Central Coast Mariners	6,059
Melbourne City	9,548
Melbourne Victory	27,054
Newcastle Jets	9,266
Perth Glory	7,109
Sydney FC	13,154
Wellington Phoenix	5,062
Western Sydney Wanderers	18,361
Total	109,710
Average	10,971

Last updated: 10 April 2016.
Source: aleague.com.au

=== Player stats ===
==== Top scorers ====
As of matches played on 10 April 2016

Rank	Player	Club	Goals
1	(Uruguay) Bruno Fornaroli	Melbourne City	23
2	(Australia) Jamie Maclaren	Brisbane Roar	18
3	(Albania) Besart Berisha	Melbourne Victory	17
4	(Spain) Diego Castro	Perth Glory	13
5	(Australia) Aaron Mooy	Melbourne City	11
6	(Slovakia) Filip Hološko	Sydney FC	10
6	(Republic of Ireland) Andy Keogh	Perth Glory	10
6	(Australia) Mitch Nichols	Western Sydney Wanderers	10
6	(Martinique) Harry Novillo	Melbourne City	10
6	(Australia) Brendon Šantalab	Western Sydney Wanderers	10

==== Hat-tricks ====
Player	For	Against	Result	Date	Ref
(Australia) Blake Powell^{4}	Wellington Phoenix	Western Sydney Wanderers	5–2	14 February 2016	
(Uruguay) Bruno Fornaroli	Melbourne City	Sydney FC	3–0	5 March 2016	
(Australia) Jamie Maclaren	Brisbane Roar	Melbourne Victory	5–0	12 March 2016	
(Netherlands) Romeo Castelen	Western Sydney Wanderers	Brisbane Roar	5–4	24 April 2016	

Note

^{4} Player scored 4 goals

==== Own goals ====
As of matches played on 10 April 2016

Player	Club	Against	Round
(South Korea) Lee Ki-je	Newcastle Jets	Wellington Phoenix	1
(Spain) Andreu	Western Sydney Wanderers	Adelaide United	2
(Australia) Diogo Ferreira	Perth Glory	Adelaide United	3
(New Zealand) Andrew Durante	Wellington Phoenix	Melbourne Victory	4
(Malta) Manny Muscat	Wellington Phoenix	Adelaide United	12
(Australia) Jake McGing	Central Coast Mariners	Sydney FC	12
(Australia) Patrick Kisnorbo	Melbourne City	Brisbane Roar	12
(Northern Ireland) Aaron Hughes	Melbourne City	Western Sydney Wanderers	14
(Australia) Tarek Elrich	Adelaide United	Perth Glory	14
(Australia) Corey Brown	Brisbane Roar	Adelaide United	16
(Australia) Daniel Mullen	Newcastle Jets	Perth Glory	16
(Australia) Matthew Jurman	Sydney FC	Melbourne Victory	16
(Spain) Corona	Brisbane Roar	Sydney FC	17
(Serbia) Enver Alivodić	Newcastle Jets	Brisbane Roar	19
(New Zealand) Andrew Durante	Wellington Phoenix	Newcastle Jets	20
(Australia) Scott Jamieson	Western Sydney Wanderers	Sydney FC	20

==== Clean sheets ====
As of matches played on 10 April 2016

Rank	Player	Club	Clean sheets
1	(Australia) Eugene Galekovic	Adelaide United	12
2	(Australia) Vedran Janjetović	Sydney FC	8
3	(Australia) Andrew Redmayne	Western Sydney Wanderers	7
3	(Australia) Danny Vukovic	Melbourne Victory	7
3	(England) Jamie Young	Brisbane Roar	7
6	(Australia) Ante Covic	Perth Glory	5
7	(Denmark) Thomas Sørensen	Melbourne City	4
8	(Australia) Mark Birighitti	Newcastle Jets	3
8	(New Zealand) Glen Moss	Wellington Phoenix	3
10	(Australia) Liam Reddy	Western Sydney Wanderers	2

=== Discipline ===
During the season each club is given fair play points based on the number of cards they received in games. A yellow card is worth 1 point, a second yellow card is worth 2 points, and a red card is worth 3 points. At the annual awards night, the club with the fewest points wins the Fair Play Award.

Club	Yellow card	Second yellow card	Red card	FP Pts
Brisbane Roar	45	1	0	47
Perth Glory	56	4	1	67
Adelaide United	70	0	0	70
Newcastle Jets	57	5	1	70
Sydney FC	64	1	2	72
Wellington Phoenix	68	3	0	74
Western Sydney Wanderers	69	0	2	75
Melbourne City	72	2	1	79
Central Coast Mariners	58	6	3	80
Melbourne Victory	73	1	2	81
League total	632	23	12	

Last updated: 9 April 2016.
Source: ultimatealeague.com

== End-of-season awards ==
The following end of the season awards were announced at the 2015–16 Dolan Warren Awards night held at the Carriageworks in Sydney on 26 April 2016.

- Johnny Warren Medal – Diego Castro, Perth Glory
- NAB Young Footballer of the Year – Jamie Maclaren, Brisbane Roar
- Nike Golden Boot Award – Bruno Fornaroli, Melbourne City (23 goals)
- Goalkeeper of the Year – Thomas Sørensen, Melbourne City
- Coach of the Year – Guillermo Amor, Adelaide United
- Fair Play Award – Brisbane Roar
- Referee of the Year – Jarred Gillett
- Goal of the Year – Roy O'Donovan, Central Coast Mariners (Adelaide United v Central Coast Mariners, 27 March 2016)

== See also ==
- 2015–16 Adelaide United FC season
- 2015–16 Brisbane Roar FC season
- 2015–16 Central Coast Mariners FC season
- 2015–16 Melbourne City FC season
- 2015–16 Melbourne Victory FC season
- 2015–16 Newcastle Jets FC season
- 2015–16 Perth Glory FC season
- 2015–16 Sydney FC season
- 2015–16 Wellington Phoenix FC season
- 2015–16 Western Sydney Wanderers FC season
