= The Barlow Roman Catholic High School =

The Barlow RC High School

Location
- Parrs Wood Road; Didsbury; Manchester, M20 6BX; England; 53.415°N 2.220°W

Information
- Type: Voluntary aided school
- Motto: If you believe, you can achieve!
- Religious affiliation: Roman Catholic
- Established: 1985
- Local authority: Manchester
- Department for Education URN: 105581 Tables
- Ofsted: Reports
- Head teacher: Claire Wallace
- Gender: Mixed
- Age: 11 to 16
- Colours: Maroon, gold and grey
- Website: http://www.thebarlowrchigh.co.uk

Location of The Barlow School in Greater Manchester

The Barlow RC High School is a comprehensive school in Didsbury, Manchester, England.

The school is in the Roman Catholic Diocese of Salford, maintained by the Education Authority. The parish communities served by the school are St Ambrose, St Bernard's, St Bernadette's, St Catherine's and St Cuthbert's. The school's associated primary schools are St Ambrose's RC Primary School, St Bernard's RC Primary School, St Catherine's RC Primary School and St Cuthbert's RC Primary School.

== Exam results ==
In July 2012, it received national recognition from the Specialist Schools and Academies Trust (SSAT) for achieving some of the fastest improving GCSE results in the country. In August 2012, the school's GCSE results improved for the fourth year in succession. 95% of pupils achieved at 5 A*-C grades, including 74% with English and maths. The results placed the school as one of the highest performing secondary schools in Manchester.

== Ofsted report ==
Inspectors from the Office for Standards in Education who visited the school in October 2012, praised pupils, staff and governors and stated that 'under passionate, visionary leadership, the school is going from strength-to-strength.' Inspectors reported that the school is innovative in developing the curriculum and attainment is significantly above average. Pupils achieve well because teaching is consistently good as is behaviour and the school has exemplary methods of safeguarding pupils.

== Sporting achievements ==
In 2001 Barlow's year 9 football team became national champions, winning the 'Heinz Cup' at Stamford Bridge.

The team included future professional footballers Daniel Heffernan and Neal Trotman.

== Facilities ==
In April 2010 a programme of building work costing about £11.2 million began as part of the Building Schools for the Future programme, the Labour Government's investment programme to refurbish secondary schools in England. The first phase was completed in summer 2011 and in September 2011, a science block opened. The building houses three specialist and two multi-use laboratories, two science studios, an ICT learning area and two preparation rooms. The facilities were additional to a drama and dance studio, sports hall, ICT suites and astro turf pitch. The renovation concluded in August 2012 with remodelled English, Maths, Design & Technology and Art departments. The classrooms have interactive technology, including computers, laptops, whiteboards and projectors.

== Notable former pupils ==
Notable alumni include Oasis band members Liam and Noel Gallagher.
