= Luis García (footballer, born 1978) =

Spanish footballer (born 1978)

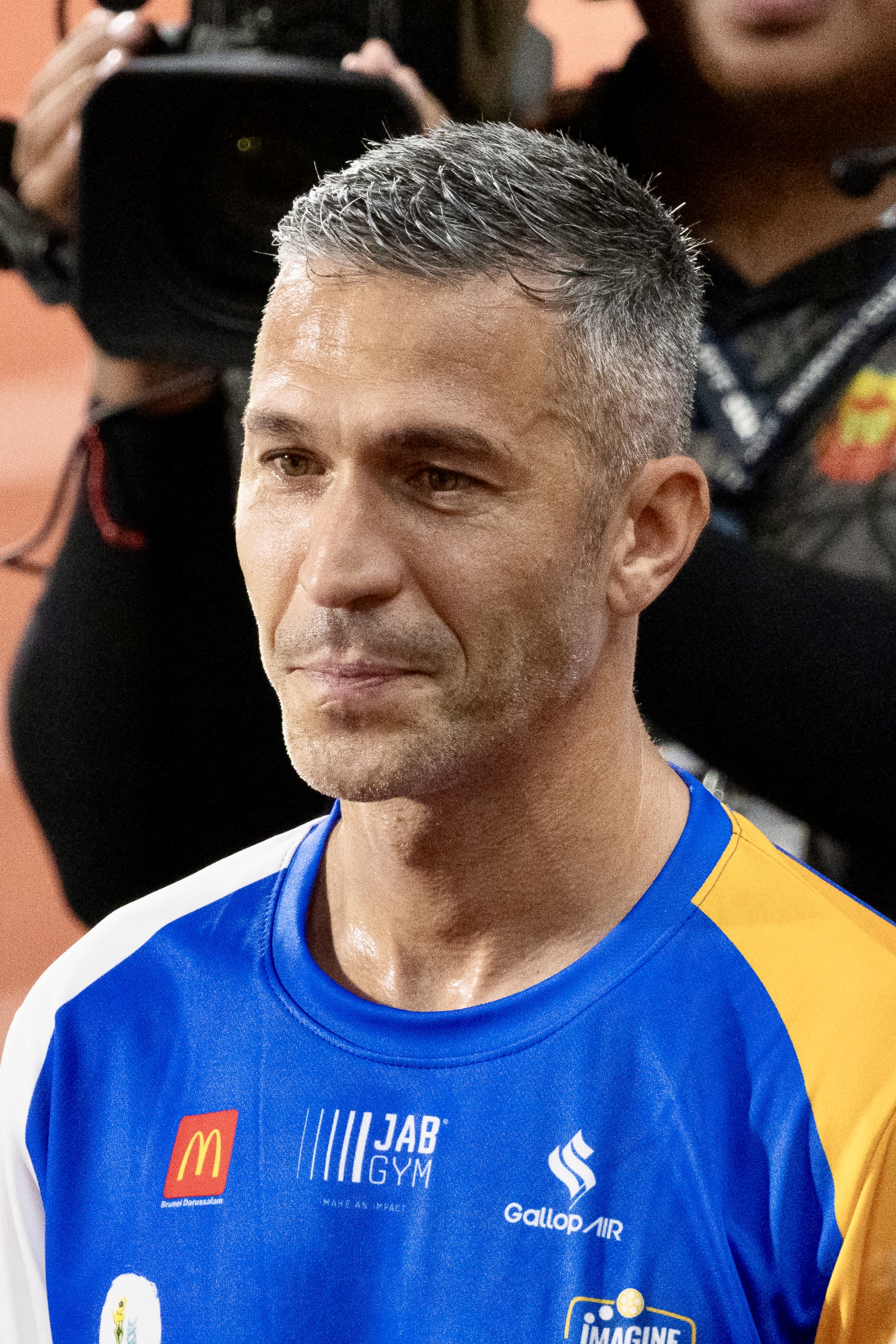
- García in 2024

Personal information
- Full name: Luis Javier García Sanz
- Date of birth: 24 June 1978 (age 48)
- Place of birth: Badalona, Spain
- Height: 1.76 m (5 ft 9 in)
- Positions: Winger; attacking midfielder

Youth career
- 1984–1988: Badalona
- 1988–1990: Sant Gabriel
- 1990–1997: Barcelona

Senior career*
Years	Team	Apps	(Gls)
1997–2002	Barcelona B	73	(25)
1998–2002	Barcelona	0	(0)
1999–2000	→ Valladolid (loan)	6	(0)
2000	→ Toledo (loan)	17	(4)
2000–2001	→ Tenerife (loan)	40	(16)
2001–2002	→ Valladolid (loan)	25	(7)
2002–2003	Atlético Madrid	30	(9)
2003–2004	Barcelona	25	(4)
2004–2007	Liverpool	77	(18)
2007–2009	Atlético Madrid	49	(2)
2009–2010	Racing Santander	15	(0)
2010–2011	Panathinaikos	18	(2)
2011–2012	Puebla	33	(14)
2012–2013	UNAM	35	(4)
2014	Atlético Kolkata	13	(2)
2016	Central Coast Mariners	10	(2)
Total		466	(109)

International career
2005–2006	Spain	18	(4)
2001–2008	Catalonia	5	(3)
- * Club domestic league appearances and goals

Luis Javier García Sanz (born 24 June 1978) is a Spanish former professional footballer who played as a winger.

He played for Barcelona and Atlético Madrid in his homeland amongst others – being brought up in the former's youth ranks – appearing abroad for Liverpool, with whom he won the 2005 Champions League and the 2006 FA Cup. Over the course of eight seasons, he amassed La Liga totals of 150 games and 22 goals.

A Spain international for three years, García earned 18 caps and represented the nation at the 2006 World Cup.

== Club career ==
=== Barcelona ===
Born in Badalona, Barcelona, Catalonia, García began playing football with local Badalona at the age of 6, arriving at Barcelona's academy six years later from neighbours Sant Gabriel. After two successful seasons with their reserves, he left on loan for Real Valladolid, where he made his La Liga debut on 22 August 1999 in a 1–0 away loss against Numancia. He finished the campaign at Segunda División's Toledo also on loan, his four goals not being enough to prevent relegation for the Castilla–La Mancha side; on 18 August 1998, he had made his first competitive appearance for the Blaugrana, coming on as 78th-minute substitute for Boudewijn Zenden in a 2–1 defeat at Mallorca in the Supercopa de España.

Subsequently, García played another year in the second tier, being instrumental in Tenerife's promotion by scoring 16 league goals under the guidance of manager Rafael Benítez. Loaned for the fourth time by Barcelona, he returned to Valladolid for 2001–02, netting seven top-division goals in 25 matches, including two in a 5–1 away victory over Tenerife.

=== Atlético Madrid and Barcelona return ===
In the 2002–03 season, García was sold to Atlético Madrid for €3.6 million but, after a highly successful individual campaign (nine league goals), Barcelona activated a clause which allowed the player's return for an additional €1.4 million. He had another good year at the Camp Nou, helping the team to the second place in the league, five points behind champions Valencia.

=== Liverpool ===
García was signed by former Tenerife coach Benítez for Liverpool on 20 August 2004, on a five-year contract for a fee of £6 million. He was the fourth Spaniard the club acquired that summer and, nine days after arriving, made his Premier League debut in a 1–0 away loss to Bolton Wanderers, where he had an apparently legitimate goal ruled out for offside. His first goal with his new club concluded a 3–0 victory over West Bromwich Albion at Anfield on 11 September, and he went on to net seven more times in the league that season, including the headed winner in the Merseyside derby against Everton on 20 March 2005.

García was also a key player in Liverpool's successful campaign in the UEFA Champions League, scoring winning goals against Juventus and Chelsea (a controversial one in the fourth minute, dubbed a "ghost goal" by Chelsea manager José Mourinho), in the quarter-finals and semi-finals, respectively. Having appeared in the final against AC Milan, he finished his first season in English football with 13 goals in all competitions.

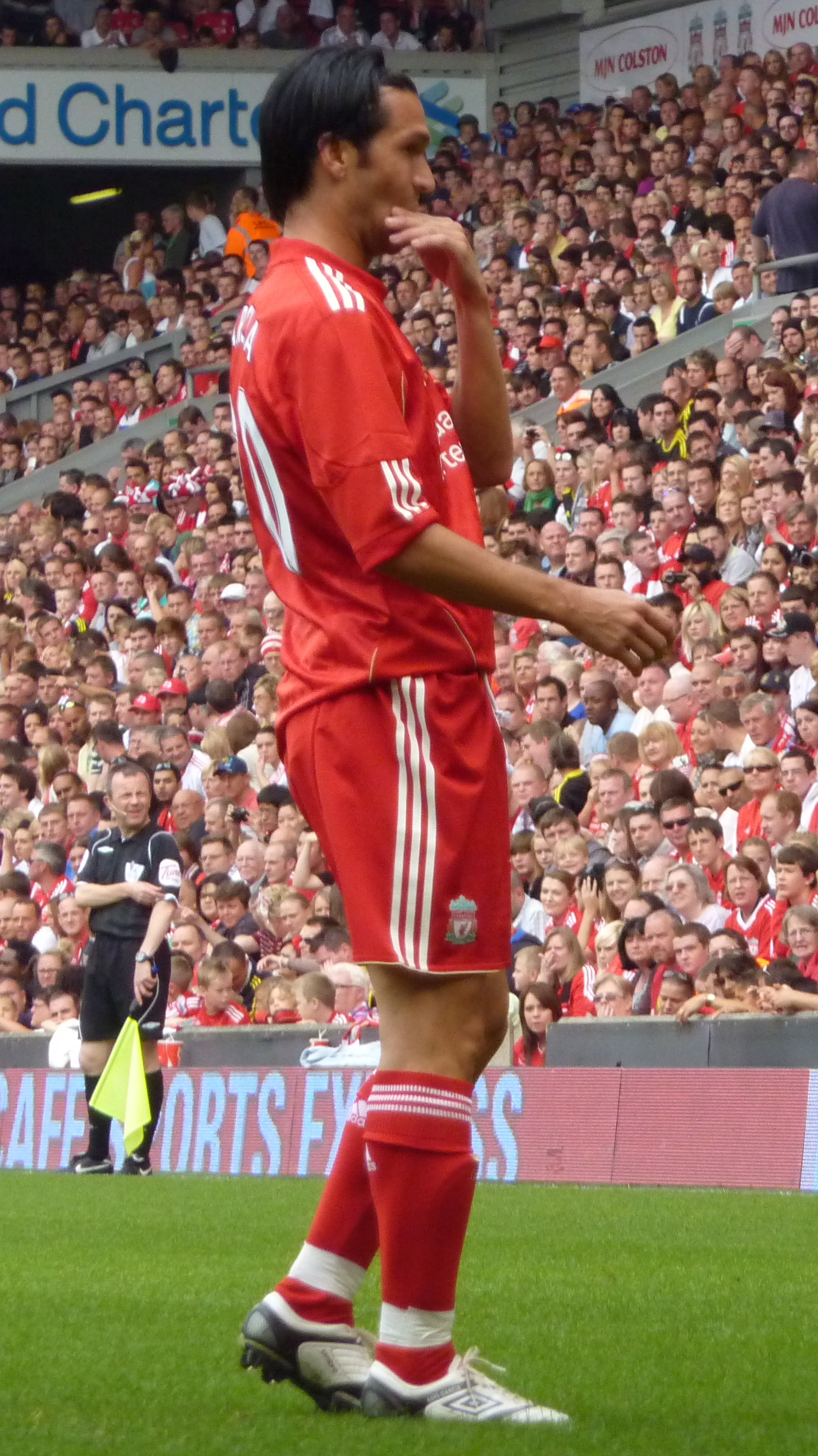
García during Jamie Carragher's testimonial match (2010)

García did not make so much of an impact in the 2005–06 campaign, although he weighed in with some vital goals, including one against Chelsea to put them out of the FA Cup in the semi-finals. He was suspended for the final victory over West Ham United, having been sent off in a league game just days after his semi-final winner, against the same opposition. Early into the season, he also scored the third goal in the Reds' 2005 UEFA Super Cup 3–1 final defeat of CSKA Moscow.

On 10 January 2007, following the 6–3 defeat to Arsenal in the League Cup which was his final game for Liverpool, it was announced that García had ruptured the anterior cruciate ligament in his right knee during the game. He would be out for at least six months.

His positive relationship with the fans was in great measure due to his decisive goals against Chelsea. It was further underlined by the song frequently sung in his honour, to the tune of "You Are My Sunshine": "Luis García, he drinks Sangria/he came from Barça to bring us joy!/He's five-foot seven, he's football heaven/So please don't take our Luis away!" In the 2013 poll of the 100 Players Who Shook the Kop, García ranked 34th. He totalled 30 goals in 122 competitive appearances during his tenure, with ten coming in the Champions League, five in the knockout stages of the 2005 triumph.

=== Return to Spain ===
In early July 2007, García joined his former team Atlético Madrid for around £4 million, with his transfer being negotiated between the two clubs around the same time that they were arranging a deal for Fernando Torres in the opposite direction. Nonetheless, these deals were conducted separately.

García managed 30 appearances in his first season, acting mainly as backup to Portugal's Simão Sabrosa. He played both matches against his former side Liverpool in the following campaign's Champions League group stage; on 4 November 2008, he came on as a late substitute at Anfield to appreciative applause. During the league, however, he fell out of favour, sometimes not even making the list of 18.

On 11 August 2009, García reached an agreement with Racing de Santander. His season was quite unassuming, as he took part in just 18 games without scoring and the Cantabrians narrowly avoided relegation.

=== Later career ===
García signed a one-year contract with Greek club Panathinaikos on 28 August 2010. On 4 September, he flew back to Anfield to take part in Carragher's testimonial match, scoring a goal in the second minute. He returned to the Camp Nou ten days later, playing the last 20 minutes of a 5–1 loss in the Champions League group phase.

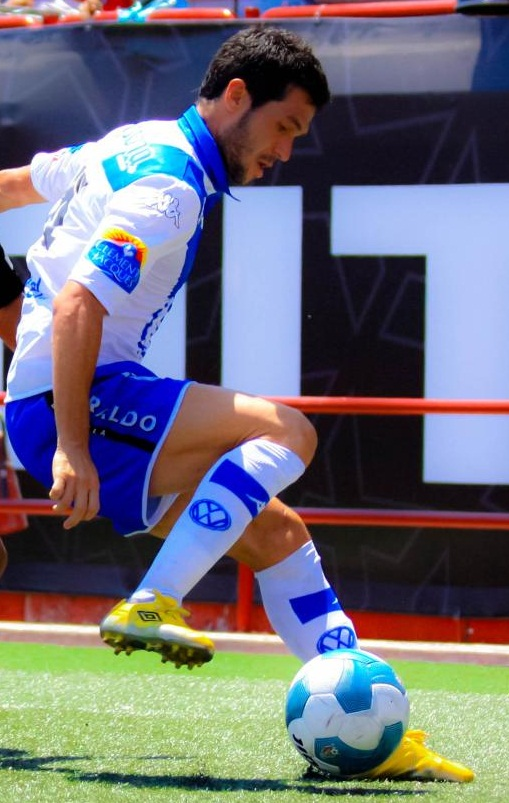
García playing for Puebla in 2011

On 1 July 2011, the 33-year-old García moved to Mexican team Puebla. He scored his first goal for La Franja on the 24th, through a penalty kick away to Atlas (1–0).

In early June 2012, García signed for another side in the Liga MX, UNAM, joining alongside Martín Romagnoli for an undisclosed fee. He made his official debut against Atlas, playing 34 minutes from the bench.

García announced his retirement from football on 14 January 2014, aged 35. He made the announcement on his official website, saying, "Today I've decided to retire as a professional footballer, thanks for the interest from the teams that spoke with me in recent weeks, but I think the time has come to end this important chapter in my life and move to the next page."

García came out of retirement in July 2014, joining newly formed Indian Super League franchise Atlético de Kolkata as their marquee player ahead of the league's inaugural season, the first of such players to join the league. He started in the league's opening match, as his new team won 3–0 at home against Mumbai City. On 21 November he had a wrongly disallowed goal in an eventual 2–1 loss at Kerala Blasters but, despite finishing the regular season in third, Kolkata won the league final against the same adversary, although he was an unused substitute; he also won the league's Manyavar Most Exciting Player award.

Due to concerns over his injury record, García was not retained for the 2015 campaign. On 16 January 2016, he signed for Central Coast Mariners initially until the end of the campaign. He made his A-League debut one week later, coming off the bench and playing a role in his team's goal in a 2–1 home defeat to Western Sydney Wanderers. In the next match, against Wellington Phoenix, he was again brought in as a replacement, scoring once and setting up two more in the 3–1 win.

== International career ==
After a productive first season with Liverpool, García made his debut for the Spain national team on 26 March 2005, appearing in a 3–0 friendly defeat of China in Salamanca. On 12 November that year, he scored a hat-trick in a 5–1 home win over Slovakia for the 2006 FIFA World Cup qualification play-offs.

García was then chosen as part of the nation's squad-of-23 for the finals in Germany. He started in victories against Ukraine and Tunisia, and was used as a substitute in the round-of-16 3–1 loss to France.

== Style of play ==
Known for his speed and technical skills, which made him a threat inside the penalty area, García normally played as a right winger. Although naturally left-footed, he was skilled with both feet, which allowed him to play on either flank; he also had a good aerial game despite his small frame and diminutive stature.

García was also frequently deployed behind the main striker, either as a second striker or as an attacking midfielder, or even as a false 9 on occasion.

== Post-retirement ==
After retiring, García worked as pundit for ESPN and beIN Sports, notably covering UEFA Euro 2016 for the latter channel.

On 21 March 2025, Garcia was appointed chief executive officer of Malaysia Super League club Johor Darul Ta'zim.

== Career statistics ==
=== Club ===
Appearances and goals by club, season and competition
Club	Season	League			Cup		Continental		Other		Total	
Club	Season	Division	Apps	Goals	Apps	Goals	Apps	Goals	Apps	Goals	Apps	Goals
Barcelona B	1997–98	Segunda División B	36	15	—		—		6 (Note: Appearances in Segunda División B play-offs)	3	42	18
Barcelona B	1998–99	Segunda División	37	10	—		—		—		37	10
Barcelona B	Total		73	25	0	0	0	0	6	3	79	28
Barcelona	1998–99	La Liga	0	0	0	0	0	0	1 (Note: Appearance in Supercopa de España)	0	1	0
Valladolid (loan)	1999–2000	La Liga	6	0	2	0	—		—		8	0
Toledo (loan)	1999–2000	Segunda División	17	4	0	0	—		—		17	4
Tenerife (loan)	2000–01	Segunda División	40	16	1	0	—		—		41	16
Valladolid (loan)	2001–02	La Liga	25	7	4	3	—		—		29	10
Atlético Madrid	2002–03	La Liga	30	9	2	0	—		—		32	9
Barcelona	2003–04	La Liga	25	4	6	1	7 (Note: Appearances in UEFA Cup)	3	—		38	8
Liverpool	2004–05	Premier League	29	8	3	0	12 (Note: Appearances in UEFA Champions League)	5	—		44	13
Liverpool	2005–06	Premier League	31	7	4	1	13	2	3 (Note: Appearances in UEFA Super Cup and FIFA Club World Cup)	1	51	11
Liverpool	2006–07	Premier League	17	3	2	0	7	3	1 (Note: Appearance in FA Community Shield)	0	27	6
Liverpool	Total		77	18	9	1	32	10	4	1	122	30
Atlético Madrid	2007–08	La Liga	30	2	6	0	9	4	—		45	6
Atlético Madrid	2008–09	La Liga	19	0	3	0	7	1	—		29	1
Atlético Madrid	Total		49	2	9	0	16	5	0	0	74	7
Racing Santander	2009–10	La Liga	15	0	3	0	—		—		18	0
Panathinaikos	2010–11	Super League Greece	18	2	1	0	6	0	—		25	2
Puebla	2011–12	Liga MX	33	14	0	0	—		—		33	14
UNAM	2012–13	Liga MX	20	2	7	4	—		—		27	6
UNAM	2013–14	Liga MX	15	2	5	0	—		—		20	2
UNAM	Total		35	4	12	4	0	0	0	0	47	8
Atlético Kolkata	2014	Indian Super League	13	2	—		—		—		13	2
Central Coast Mariners	2015–16	A-League	10	2	—		—		—		10	2
Career total			466	109	49	9	61	18	11	4	587	140

=== International ===
Appearances and goals by national team and year

National team	Year	Apps	Goals
Spain	2005	6	3
Spain	2006	12	1
Total		18	4

Scores and results list Spain's goal tally first, score column indicates score after each García goal.

#	Date	Venue	Opponent	Score	Result	Competition
1.	12 November 2005	Vicente Calderón Stadium, Madrid, Spain	Slovakia	1–0	5–1	2006 FIFA World Cup qualification
2.	12 November 2005	Vicente Calderón Stadium, Madrid, Spain	Slovakia	2–0	5–1	2006 FIFA World Cup qualification
3.	12 November 2005	Vicente Calderón Stadium, Madrid, Spain	Slovakia	4–1	5–1	2006 FIFA World Cup qualification
4.	2 September 2006	Estadio Nuevo Vivero, Badajoz, Spain	Liechtenstein	4–0	4–0	UEFA Euro 2008 qualifying

== Honours ==
Liverpool

- FA Cup: 2005–06
- FA Community Shield: 2006
- UEFA Champions League: 2004–05; runner-up 2006–07
- UEFA Super Cup: 2005
- Football League Cup runner-up: 2004–05
- FIFA Club World Championship runner-up: 2005

Atlético Kolkata

- Indian Super League: 2014

Individual

- UEFA Team of the Year: 2005
