= Daniel Heffernan =

English footballer

Personal information
- Full name: Daniel Heffernan
- Date of birth: 25 May 1987 (age 39)
- Place of birth: Manchester, England
- Height: 1.88 m (6 ft 2 in)
- Position: Striker

Youth career
- Fletcher Moss Rangers
- Oldham Athletic
- Altrincham

Senior career*
Years	Team	Apps	(Gls)
2006–2008	Altrincham	0	(0)
2008–2009	Abbey Hey		
2009	Altrincham	9	(0)
2009	New Mills		
2009–2010	Whalley Range		
2010–2011	Fletcher Rangers		
2011–2012	Salford City		
2012	Shepparton SC	17	(24)
2012	Salford City		
2013–2015	Heidelberg United	66	(50)
2015–2016	Central Coast Mariners	7	(0)
2016	Goulburn Valley Suns	12	(8)
2016–2017	Bali United	7	(0)
2017	Abbey Hey		
2019–	Whalley Range		
2025-	Abbey Hey	3	(3)
- * Club domestic league appearances and goals as of 17 June 2016 ‡ National team caps and goals as of 4 January 2016

Daniel Heffernan (born 25 May 1987) is an English footballer who plays as a striker for Abbey Hey. He has previously played in England, Australia and Indonesia. In 2019, Heffernan returned to England and signed with Whalley Range FC.

== Career ==
Born in Manchester, Heffernan started his career at Fletcher Moss Rangers, and played for several semi-professional and non-league English clubs before moving to Australia for a brief spell with Shepparton Soccer Club in the North Eastern Soccer League. After returning to England, he travelled back to Australia as interest in his services became apparent from several Victorian National Premier League clubs, including South Melbourne, Port Melbourne and Green Gully. Heffernan would however sign with Heidelberg United and go on to score 50 league goals for the club, including 32 in the 2014 and 2015 NPL Victoria seasons. Heffernan scored twice for Heidelberg during the 2015 FFA Cup, once in their Round of 32 match against Broadmeadow Magic, and in the Round of 16 clash against Sydney United 58, the latter in which he became the quickest goalscorer in the cup, scoring after just 26 seconds. Heffernan was also part of the Barlow R.C High School football side who became national school champions at Stamford Bridge.

=== First Professional Contract ===
Following his impressive performances for Heidelberg in the National Premier Leagues and FFA Cup, A-League club Central Coast Mariners offered a trial by coach Tony Walmsley. After impressing Walmsley with his performances, including a hat-trick in a friendly game against fellow A-League club Western Sydney Wanderers, he was offered a 1-year contract. He made his professional debut for the club in their opening round loss of the 2015-16 A-League season against Brisbane Roar. On 11 April 2016, after seven A-League appearances without a goal for the Mariners, Heffernan was released by the club.

Heffernan signed for the Goulburn Valley Suns in May 2016.

After a spell in Indonesia with Bali United, he later returned to England and re signed for former club Abbey Hey.
