= Tony Walmsley =

Australian professional football coach (born 1966)

Personal information
- Date of birth: 10 May 1966 (age 60)
- Place of birth: Manchester, England

Senior career*
Years	Team	Apps	(Gls)
- Riverside Olympic

Managerial career
- 2009–2012: Central Coast Mariners (youth)
- 2012–2013: Sheffield United (Head of Academy Recruitment)
- 2015–2016: Central Coast Mariners
- * Club domestic league appearances and goals

Tony Walmsley is an Australian professional football coach who worked as Technical Director and Head Coach for A-League side Central Coast Mariners.

== Career ==
Tony Walmsley started his coaching career in 1989 when he served as player/coach for Riverside Olympic in Tasmania.

Walmsley has previously served as Academy Director for the Manchester United Youth Development Programme in Oceania. He was then appointed the manager of Central Coast Mariners youth team for three seasons, where his team never finished outside the top two and won the A-League National Youth League in the 2011–12 season. In September 2012 he became the Head of Academy Recruitment for English League One side Sheffield United's youth team.

Walmsley was appointed as Technical Director of the Mariners on 19 February 2015 and caretaker head coach of the Mariners from 6 March 2015.

On 15 April 2015 Walmsley was announced as Mariners permanent Technical Director/Head Coach for the 2015–16 season.

Under Walmsley, the Mariners had their worst A-League performance to date in the 2015–16 season. The Mariners' 13 points, the fewest in club history, resulted in a last-place finish, and they set a league record by losing 20 games while winning only 3, a record low for the Mariners. Central Coast allowed 70 goals, the most in league history, and had a goal difference of −37, the worst by an A-League team. The Mariners' totals of goals conceded at home and away (32 and 38 respectively) were also A-League records, and they went the entire season without a clean sheet.

In the 2016 FFA Cup, the Mariners suffered a 2–1 loss to Green Gully SC at Green Gully Reserve, becoming just the second A-League team to be eliminated by a state league team in the FFA Cup. As a result of the last placed finish in the 2015–16 season, and the Mariners' elimination from the 2016 FFA Cup, Walmsley was sacked by the Mariners on 8 August 2016, with coaching duties in the leadup to the 2016–17 season taken up by assistant coach John Hutchinson in a caretaker role. Walmsley was eventually succeeded by Australia national under-20 soccer team manager Paul Okon.

== Managerial statistics ==
As of 19 December 2016.

Team	Nat	From	To	Record				
Team	Nat	From	To	G	W	D	L	Win %
Central Coast Mariners	(Australia)	19 February 2015	8 August 2016	37	5	5	27	13.51
Total				37	5	5	27	13.51
