= Mitch Austin =

Australian soccer player (born 1991)

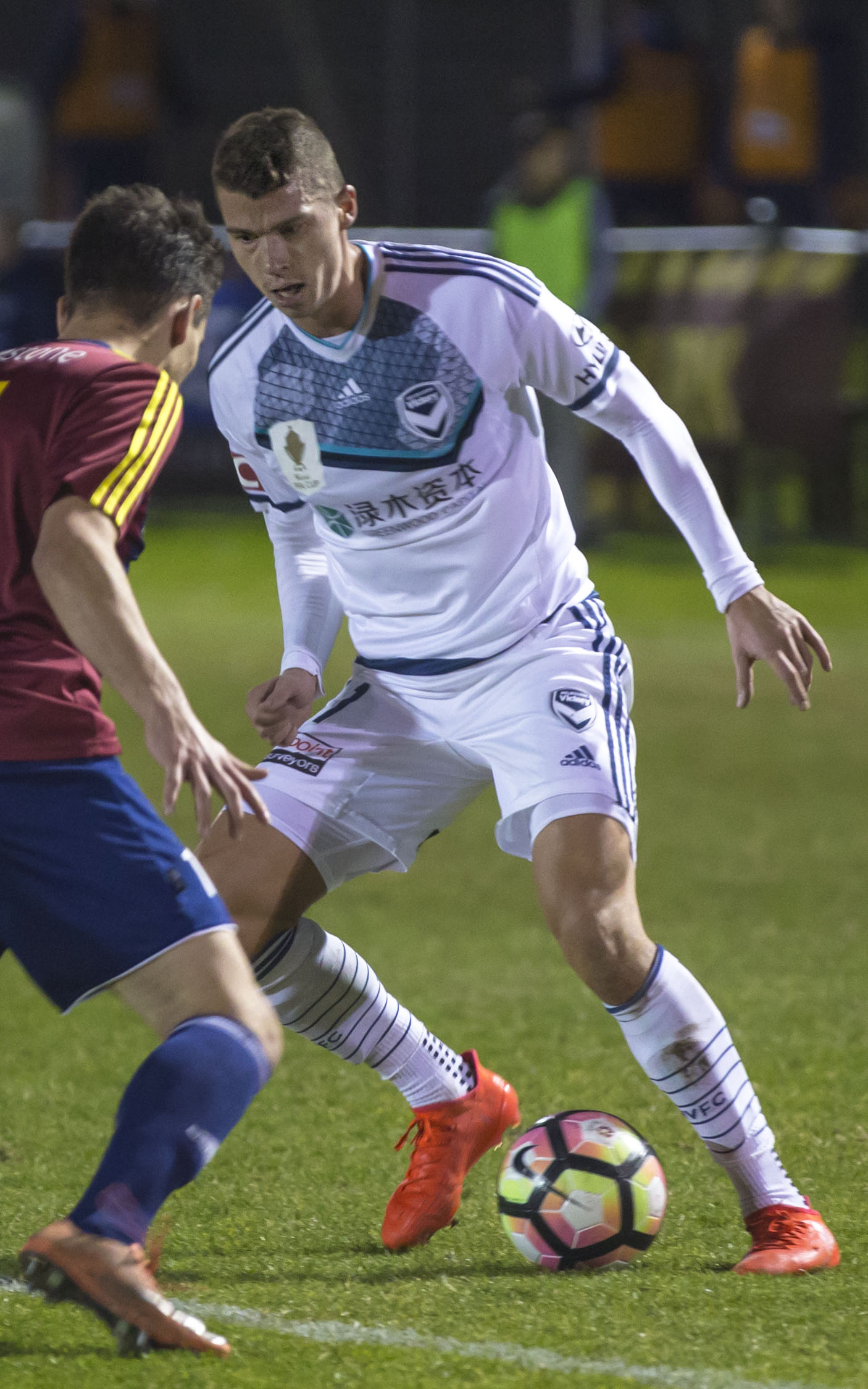
- Austin with the Melbourne Victory in 2016

Personal information
- Full name: Mitchell Gregory Reginald Austin
- Date of birth: 3 April 1991 (age 35)
- Place of birth: Rochdale, Greater Manchester, England
- Height: 1.86 m (6 ft 1 in)
- Position: Winger

Youth career
- Manly United
- 2009–2010: Rotherham United

Senior career*
Years	Team	Apps	(Gls)
2010–2013	Stalybridge	69	(10)
2013–2015	Cambridge United	9	(0)
2014	→ Lincoln City (loan)	6	(0)
2014	→ Brackley Town (loan)	9	(2)
2014	→ Southport (loan)	8	(0)
2015–2016	Central Coast Mariners	23	(5)
2016–2018	Melbourne Victory	24	(4)
2018–2019	Newcastle Jets	4	(0)
2019	Sydney FC	2	(0)
2019–2020	Partick Thistle	1	(0)
2025–	Daisy Hill FC		
- * Club domestic league appearances and goals

Mitchell Gregory Reginald Austin (born 3 April 1991) is an Australian content creator and former professional soccer player who played as a winger.

Born in England to an Australian father, Austin began his senior career at Stalybridge Celtic in 2010. Three years later, he joined Cambridge United and, after loans to Lincoln City, Brackley Town and Southport in 2014, Austin moved to Australian side Central Coast Mariners in 2015. He remained in Australia for four more years, playing at Melbourne Victory, Newcastle Jets and Sydney FC. In 2019 Austin moved to Scotland, playing one year for Partick Thistle.

== Early life ==
Mitch Austin was born in Rochdale, Greater Manchester on 3 April 1991. He has a twin sister named Brittany. His father is the Australian rugby league, and rugby union footballer Greg Austin. He left England at the age of eight when his father retired from playing professional rugby and moved the family back to Australia.

== Career ==
=== Youth football ===
Austin was a Manly United junior in Sydney, Australia. He was spotted by the scouts of Rotherham United in 2009 whilst on a tour of the UK with Manly United and was offered a scholarship with the youth academy.

=== Stalybridge Celtic ===
In 2010, he joined Conference North team Stalybridge Celtic.

=== Cambridge United ===
After making 71 league appearances, in 2013, Austin joined Conference team Cambridge United.

In 2014, he was loaned to Lincoln City to get more first team opportunities. But Cambridge soon recalled Austin, and declined Lincoln’s request for an extension to the loan. Though weeks later he signed for Brackley Town again on loan. On 31 January 2014, his loan was extended till March.

On 13 September 2014, he made his professional debut for Cambridge United against Dagenham and Redbridge.

In May 2015, Cambridge United announced, that Austin was one out of 12 players, who would leave the club in the summer 2015 expressing his wish to return to Australia.

=== Central Coast Mariners ===
On 1 June 2015, Central Coast Mariners announced that they had signed Austin to a two-year contract. After making 23 appearances in the first year of his contract, Austin asked to terminate his second year and was released by Central Coast Mariners.

=== Melbourne Victory ===
On 17 June 2016, Melbourne Victory confirmed the signing of Austin as a straight swap for winger Connor Pain.

He made an outstanding start to his Victory career, earning Man of the Match honours in the club's pre-season friendly win over Juventus at the MCG.

Austin suffered an anterior cruciate ligament injury in training in November 2017, ruling him out for several months.

On 1 February 2018, Austin was selected to represent Melbourne Victory in the E-League's inaugural season, alongside Mouad Zwed, becoming one of a handful of professional football players to compete in e-sports as well.

=== Partick Thistle ===
Austin signed with Scottish Championship club Partick Thistle in July 2019 on a one-year deal. Austin chose kit number 77 for the 2019–20 season. On 11 January 2020, Austin made his first team debut after suffering an injury in July 2019. Austin only made two appearances for Partick Thistle before the season was cut short due to the COVID-19 pandemic. Austin left Thistle in March 2020 during the pandemic to return home to his family in Australia.

Since his departure from Thistle, Austin has been in a state of free agency for more than five years due to an injury necessitating two cartilage transplants, during which time he has awaited suitable donors for the surgical procedures.

=== Daisy Hill ===
In 2025 Austin returned to football, joining semi-professional non-league club Daisy Hill who play in the North West Counties League Division One North.

== Career statistics ==
As of 6 February 2019

Appearances and goals by club, season and competition
Club	Season	League			Cup		Continental		Total	
Club	Season	Division	Apps	Goals	Apps	Goals	Apps	Goals	Apps	Goals
Stalybridge Celtic	2010–11	Conference North	5	0	2	0	0	0	7	0
Stalybridge Celtic	2011–12	Conference North	27	1	7	1	0	0	34	2
Stalybridge Celtic	2012–13	Conference North	37	9	7	2	0	0	44	11
Stalybridge Celtic	Total		69	10	16	3	0	0	85	13
Cambridge United	2013–14	Conference Premier	8	0	3	0	0	0	11	0
Cambridge United	2014–15	Football League Two	1	0	0	0	0	0	1	0
Cambridge United	Total		9	0	3	0	0	0	12	0
Lincoln City (loan)	2013–14	Conference Premier	6	0	0	0	0	0	6	0
Brackley Town (loan)	2013–14	Conference North	5	1	0	0	0	0	5	1
Brackley Town (loan)	2014–15	Conference North	4	1	0	0	0	0	4	1
Brackley Town (loan)	Total		9	2	0	0	0	0	9	2
Southport (loan)	2014–15	Conference Premier	8	0	8	0	0	0	16	0
Central Coast Mariners	2015–16	A-League	23	5	1	0	0	0	24	5
Melbourne Victory	2016–17	A-League	19	3	3	0	0	0	22	3
Melbourne Victory	2017–18	A-League	5	1	2	1	0	0	7	2
Melbourne Victory	Total		24	4	5	1	0	0	29	5
Newcastle Jets	2018–19	A-League	5	0	0	0	0	0	5	0
Sydney FC	2018–19	A-League	2	0	0	0	2	0	4	0
Partick Thistle	2019–20	Scottish Championship	1	0	1	0	0	0	2	0
Career total			156	21	34	4	2	0	192	25

== Honours ==
Cambridge United

- FA Trophy: 2013–14
