= Harry Ascroft =

Australian professional footballer

Personal information
- Full name: Harry Andrew Ascroft
- Date of birth: 1 July 1995 (age 31)
- Place of birth: Sydney, Australia
- Height: 1.83 m (6 ft 0 in)
- Position: Defender

Team information
- Current team: Dandenong City
- Number: 6

Youth career
- Bankstown City
- Sydney University

Senior career*
Years	Team	Apps	(Gls)
2013	Sydney University	19	(0)
2013–2015	VVV-Venlo	7	(0)
2015–2017	Central Coast Mariners	35	(4)
2018	Balzan	4	(0)
2019	Finn Harps	16	(2)
2020–2023	Dandenong Thunder	65	(4)
2024–2025	Hume City	27	(1)
2026–	Dandenong City	9	(1)

International career
2014	Australia U-20	1	(1)
- * Club domestic league appearances and goals as of 3 May 2026

Harry Andrew Ascroft (born 1 July 1995) is an Australian professional footballer who plays as a centre back or central midfielder for Dandenong City in the NPL Victoria.

Ascroft was born in Sydney, and played youth football with Bankstown City FC before starting his senior career with Sydney University. In 2013, he moved to the Netherlands to play for VVV-Venlo in the Eerste Divisie and later moved back to Australia to play for Central Coast Mariners in 2015.

He has represented Australia at under-20 level.

== Club career ==
In late 2013, aged 18, Ascroft signed with Dutch Eerste Divisie side VVV-Venlo. He was released by VVV along with fellow Australian Travis Cooper in early 2015 due to the club's financial difficulties

On 29 July 2015, Ascroft was signed by Central Coast Mariners on a three-year deal. Ascroft made his Mariners debut against the Perth Glory as the Mariners stole three points in the 3–2 win. He netted his maiden A-League goal as the Mariners were plundered 4–1 by Sydney FC in Round 12.

On 18 January 2018, Ascroft was released by Central Coast Mariners to join Maltese club Balzan.

On 18 January 2019, Ascroft signed for League of Ireland side Finn Harps on a one-year deal, joining up with former Balzan team-mate Jacob Borg at the newly promoted Premier Division side.

== International career ==
Ascroft was called up to the Australia U-20 team for the 2014 AFF U-19 Youth Championship. Ascroft made his debut for the side in the tournament's group stage, scoring a goal in a loss to Japan.

== See also ==
- List of Central Coast Mariners FC players
