= Alastair Bray =

Australian association footballer (born 1993)

Personal information
- Full name: Alastair Bray
- Date of birth: 23 April 1993 (age 33)
- Place of birth: Darwin, Northern Territory, Australia
- Height: 1.86 m (6 ft 1 in)
- Position: Goalkeeper

Team information
- Current team: Beaumaris SC

Youth career
- 2008: Monash City FC
- 2009: VIS
- 2010–2012: Melbourne Victory
- 2012–2014: Melbourne Heart

Senior career*
Years	Team	Apps	(Gls)
2012	Bulleen Lions	21	(0)
2013–2015	Bentleigh Greens	57	(0)
2016	Green Gully	0	(0)
2016	Central Coast Mariners	1	(0)
2016–2017	Melbourne Victory	0	(0)
2018–2020	South Melbourne	4	(0)
2021–	Beaumaris SC	9	(0)
- * Club domestic league appearances and goals as of 13 September 2021 ‡ National team caps and goals as of 16 January 2016

Alastair Bray (born 23 April 1993) is an Australian professional footballer who plays as a goalkeeper for South Melbourne FC in the National Premier Leagues Victoria.

== Career ==
After featuring for the NYL sides of both Melbourne Victory and Melbourne Heart, Bray joined Bentleigh Greens during the 2013 season. During his time at the club he received a call-up to the Olyroos squad. At the conclusion of the 2015 season Bray was released by Bentleigh and subsequently signed by Green Gully although he left the club without playing a game to trial with A-League club Central Coast Mariners.

=== Central Coast Mariners ===
In January 2016, Bray signed for Central Coast on a six-month deal. He made his debut for the side on 16 January 2016 in a loss to Adelaide United. In June 2016 it was announced that Bray would not be signing a new contract to stay at the Mariners.

Following his release from the Mariners, Bray returned to Melbourne Victory on trial, featuring in a friendly against NPL side Port Melbourne SC in August 2016.

=== Melbourne Victory ===
On 23 September 2016, Bray signed a one-year deal with Melbourne Victory, where he had previously spent two years as a youth player. On 12 May 2017, Bray was released by the club.

=== South Melbourne FC ===
On 2 February 2018, Bray signed a two-year contract with South Melbourne FC. He made his debut for the club in round 1 of the NPL Victoria season against Bulleen Lions, however in the final moments of the match, he suffered a season ending ACL injury.

== See also ==
- List of Central Coast Mariners FC players
