= Daniel Georgievski =

Macedonian Footballer

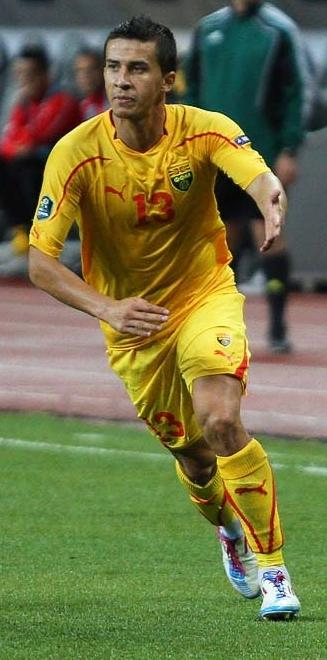
- Georgievski with Macedonia in 2011

Personal information
- Date of birth: 17 February 1988 (age 38)
- Place of birth: Blacktown, Australia
- Height: 1.78 m (5 ft 10 in)
- Position: Full-back

Youth career
- 2005–2006: Marconi Stallions
- 2006–2007: Dinamo Zagreb

Senior career*
Years	Team	Apps	(Gls)
2007–2010	Međimurje	67	(2)
2010–2012	Šibenik	39	(1)
2012–2014	Steaua București	28	(1)
2014–2017	Melbourne Victory	67	(3)
2017–2019	Newcastle Jets	42	(1)
2019–2021	Western Sydney Wanderers	23	(0)
2021	Melbourne City	3	(0)
2022–2024	Inter Lions	64	(11)
Total		333	(19)

International career^{‡}
2006–2007	Macedonia U19	6	(1)
2008–2010	Macedonia U21	13	(2)
2011–2015	Macedonia	22	(0)
- * Club domestic league appearances and goals as of 24 August 2024 ‡ National team caps and goals as of 30 May 2015

Daniel Georgievski (Macedonian: Даниел Георгиевски; born 17 February 1988) is a former professional footballer who last played as a full-back for Australian side Inter Lions. Born in Australia, he played for the Macedonia national team.

Daniel is an ambassador for the charity organization, Boots for Balkans, which is a group that collects new and used football boots and donates them to underprivileged areas throughout the Balkans.

== Club career ==
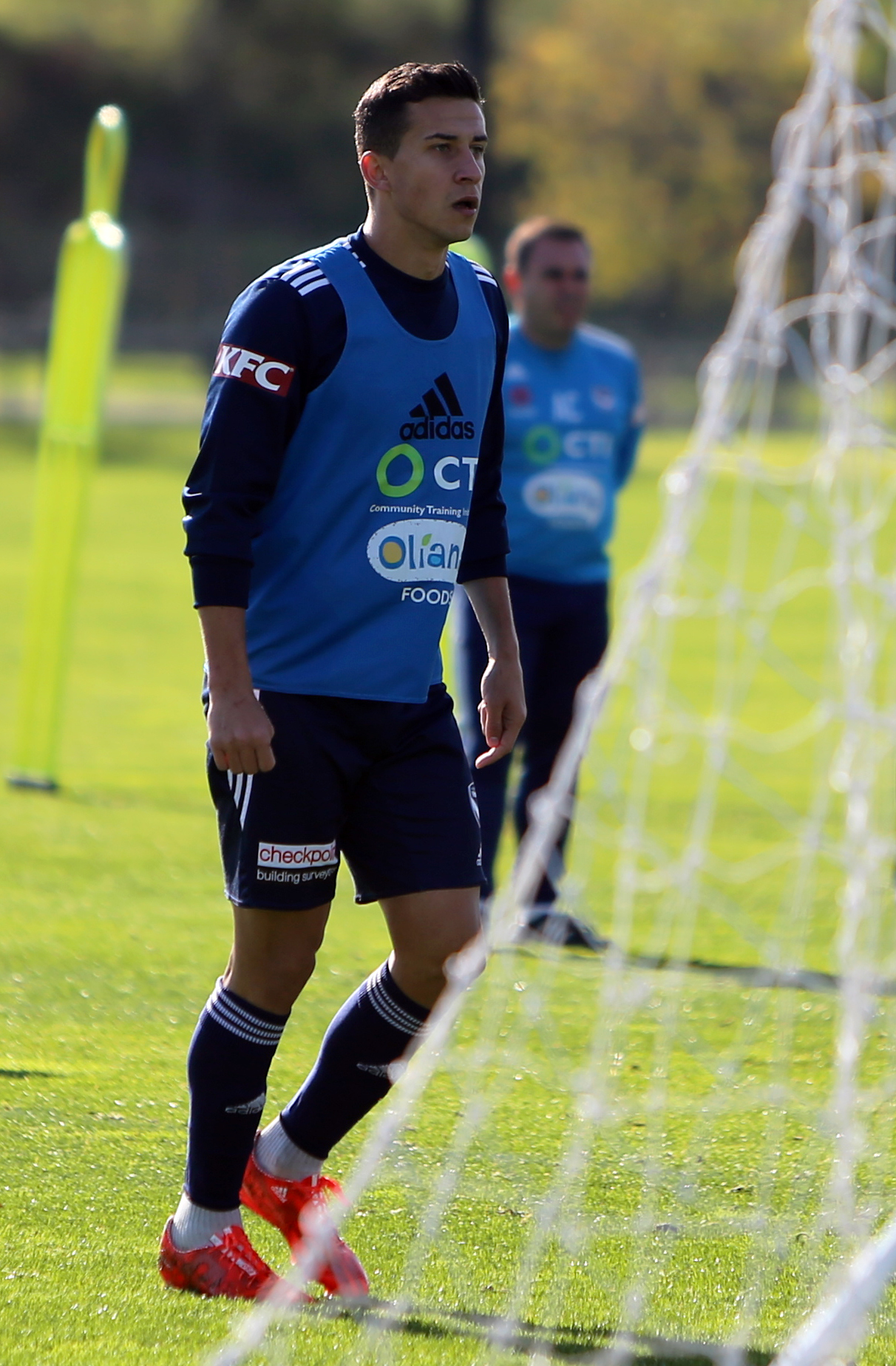
Daniel Georgievski training for Melbourne Victory, May 2015

Born in Blacktown, Australia, Georgievski spent his youth career at Australian side Marconi Stallions and Croatian side Dinamo Zagreb. He began his professional career with Međimurje in Croatia and later went on to play with Šibenik.

On 27 June 2012, it was formally announced that Georgievski had penned a contract with Steaua București of the Romanian Liga I.

On 11 September 2014, Georgievski joined the Melbourne Victory football club of the A-League on a one-year deal, and was granted the number 15 kit. Georgievski made his Melbourne Victory and A-League debut against home town club Western Sydney Wanderers on 10 October 2014, the league's first match of the tenth season, and played the left back role. His debut lasted 86 minutes and he came off with a standing ovation from his new supporters. His first goal was on 5 December 2014, the second of three by the Club at Central Coast Mariners in the 68th minute. His next came on 21 March 2015 at Adelaide United in the 63rd minute.

Georgievski signed a two-year extension to his contract on 26 June 2015.

On 30 Mar 2017, it was announced that Georgievski would be leaving Melbourne Victory at the end of the 2016–2017 season with a move to Newcastle. He was awarded the Joe Marston Medal as man of the match in the 2017 A-League Grand Final, despite Melbourne losing the match to Sydney FC in a penalty shootout.

Georgievski has become an integral part of the Newcastle Jets team. In his first season with the Jets, the team made it to the A-League Championship Final, although lost to Melbourne Victory 1–0.

In May 2019, it was announced that Georgievski left Newcastle Jets and joined Western Sydney Wanderers.

In April 2021, Georgievski departed the Western Sydney Wanderers after playing only 3 matches under coach Carl Robinson. On the same day, he joined Melbourne City as an injury replacement for Nathaniel Atkinson until the end of the 2020–21 A-League season. On 9 June, it was announced that his contract ended and he departed the club.

== International career ==
Georgievski made his debut for Macedonia on 2 September 2011 during a UEFA Euro 2012 qualifying against Russia. He started the game at right back and played all 90 minutes. As of March 2020, Georgievski has made 22 international team appearances.

== Honours ==
Steaua București

- Liga I: 2012–13, 2013–14
- Supercupa României: 2013

Melbourne Victory

- A-League Championship: 2014–15
- A-League Premiership: 2014–15
- FFA Cup: 2015

Melbourne City

- A-League Premiership: 2020-21

Individual

- Joe Marston Medal: 2017
