= 2017–18 Central Coast Mariners FC season =

Central Coast Mariners
2017–18 season
- Chairman: Michael Charlesworth
- Manager: Paul Okon (to 20 March 2018); Wayne O'Sullivan (caretaker) (from 20 March 2018)
- Stadium: Central Coast Stadium, Gosford
- A-League: 10th
- A-League Finals Series: DNQ
- FFA Cup: Round of 32
- Top goalscorer: League: Blake Powell, Connor Pain (4 goals); All: Blake Powell, Connor Pain (4 goals)
- Highest home attendance: 12,044 vs. Newcastle Jets (7 October 2017)
- Lowest home attendance: 4,973 vs. Wellington Phoenix (23 February 2018)
- Average home league attendance: 7,194
Home colours	Away colours	Third colours

The 2017–18 Central Coast Mariners FC season was the club's 13th season since its establishment in 2004. The club participated in the A-League for the 13th time and the FFA Cup for the 4th time.

== Review and events ==
=== Pre-season ===
Immediately after the end of the 2016–17 season, it was announced that goalkeepers Paul Izzo and Ivan Necevski; and attacking players Roy O'Donovan and Fábio Ferreira would be leaving the club.

== Players ==
=== Squad information ===
Note: Flags indicate national team as defined under FIFA eligibility rules; some limited exceptions apply. Players may hold more than one non-FIFA nationality.

No.	Pos.	Nation	Player
1	GK	AUS	Ben Kennedy
2	DF	NZL	Storm Roux
3	DF	AUS	Joshua Rose
4	DF	AUS	Jake McGing
5	DF	AUS	Antony Golec
6	MF	NED	Tom Hiariej
7	MF	AUS	Andrew Hoole
8	FW	AUS	Blake Powell
10	MF	AUS	Daniel De Silva
11	FW	AUS	Connor Pain
12	FW	AUS	Trent Buhagiar

No.	Pos.	Nation	Player
14	MF	AUS	Adam Berry
15	DF	ESP	Alan Baró (Captain)
16	MF	AUS	Liam Rose
17	FW	AUS	Josh Bingham
18	GK	AUS	Tom Glover (on loan from Tottenham Hotspur)
19	DF	AUS	Jacob Poscoliero
20	GK	AUS	Adam Pearce (Youth)
21	DF	AUS	Kye Rowles
22	MF	AUS	Jacob Melling
23	MF	NED	Wout Brama
27	FW	AUS	Peter Skapetis

=== Transfers in ===
No.	Position	Player	Transferred from	Type/fee	Contract length	Date	Ref
1	GK	Ben Kennedy	Newcastle Jets	Free transfer	1 year	31 March 2017	
6	MF	(Netherlands) Tom Hiariej	(Netherlands) Groningen	Free transfer	2 years	23 May 2017	
15	DF	(Spain) Alan Baró		Free transfer	2 years	28 May 2017	
5	DF	Antony Golec		Free transfer	1 year	30 May 2017	
7	MF	Andrew Hoole		Free transfer	2 years	31 May 2017	
21	DF	Kye Rowles	Brisbane Roar	Free transfer	1 year	26 June 2017	
3	DF	Joshua Rose		Free transfer	1 year	3 July 2017	
10	MF	Daniel De Silva		Free transfer	3 years	7 July 2017	
18	GK	Tom Glover	(England) Tottenham Hotspur	Loan	1 year	26 July 2017	
9	FW	(Spain) Asdrúbal		Free transfer	1 year	28 July 2017	
23	MF	(Netherlands) Wout Brama	(Netherlands) Utrecht	Undisclosed	2 years	29 July 2017	
22	MF	Jacob Melling		Free transfer	6 months	3 January 2018	
27	FW	Peter Skapetis	Brisbane Roar	Free transfer	1 year	18 January 2018	
19	DF	Jacob Poscoliero		Free transfer	6 months	31 January 2018	

=== Transfers out ===
No.	Position	Player	Transferred to	Type/fee	Date	Ref
20	GK	Paul Izzo	Adelaide United	Free transfer	18 April 2017	
9	FW	(Republic of Ireland) Roy O'Donovan	Newcastle Jets	Free transfer	18 April 2017	
1	GK	Ivan Necevski		Released	20 April 2017	
7	MF	(Portugal) Fábio Ferreira	(Malaysia) PKNS	Free transfer	21 April 2017	
8	MF	(Scotland) Nick Montgomery	(Australia) Wollongong Wolves	Free transfer	12 May 2017	
4	DF	Jacob Poscoliero	Perth Glory	Free transfer	14 May 2017	
3	DF	Scott Galloway		Released	19 May 2017	
10	MF	(Senegal) Mickaël Tavares		End of contract	19 May 2017	
19	DF	(Senegal) Jacques Faty		End of contract	19 May 2017	
21	DF	Michael Neill	(Australia) Sydney United	End of contract	23 June 2017	
23	DF	Jake Adelson		End of contract	7 July 2017	
19	DF	Harry Ascroft	(Malta) Balzan	Free transfer	18 January 2018	
9	FW	(Spain) Asdrúbal		Mutual contract termination	19 January 2018	
13	MF	Kwabena Appiah	(South Korea) Incheon United	Undisclosed	31 January 2018	

=== Contracts extensions ===
No.	Name	Position	Duration	Date	Notes
13	Kwabena Appiah	Winger	1 year	29 May 2017	
4	Jake McGing	Central defender	2 years	30 January 2018	

=== Technical staff ===
Position	Staff
Head coach	(Republic of Ireland) Wayne O'Sullivan (Caretaker)
Assistant coach	
Goalkeeping coach	(Australia) Matthew Nash
Strength and conditioning coach	
Physiotherapist	
Youth football coach	(Australia) Ben Cahn
Head of sports science	(Australia) Tim Knight

== Statistics ==
=== Squad statistics ===
N	Pos.	Nat.	Name	Total					A-League					FFA Cup
N	Pos.	Nat.	Name	Apps	Goals	Yellow card	Second yellow card	Red card	Apps	Goals	Yellow card	Second yellow card	Red card	Apps	Goals	Yellow card	Second yellow card	Red card
1	GK	(Australia)	Ben Kennedy	23	0	0	0	0	23+0	0	0	0	0	0+0	0	0	0	0
2	DF	(New Zealand)	Storm Roux	20	0	0	0	0	13+6	0	0	0	0	1+0	0	0	0	0
3	DF	(Australia)	Joshua Rose	18	0	2	1	0	15+2	0	1	1	0	1+0	0	1	0	0
4	DF	(Australia)	Jake McGing	25	3	4	0	1	20+4	3	4	0	1	1+0	0	0	0	0
5	DF	(Australia)	Antony Golec	23	0	5	0	0	22+0	0	5	0	0	1+0	0	0	0	0
6	MF	(Netherlands)	Tom Hiariej	20	0	3	0	0	19+0	0	3	0	0	1+0	0	0	0	0
7	MF	(Australia)	Andrew Hoole	24	3	7	1	0	23+0	3	7	1	0	1+0	0	0	0	0
8	FW	(Australia)	Blake Powell	19	4	2	0	0	10+9	4	2	0	0	0+0	0	0	0	0
10	MF	(Australia)	Daniel De Silva	22	2	4	0	0	20+1	2	4	0	0	0+1	0	0	0	0
11	FW	(Australia)	Connor Pain	23	4	1	0	0	20+2	4	1	0	0	1+0	0	0	0	0
12	FW	(Australia)	Trent Buhagiar	20	2	2	0	0	4+15	2	2	0	0	0+1	0	0	0	0
14	MF	(Australia)	Adam Berry	2	0	0	0	0	0+2	0	0	0	0	0+0	0	0	0	0
15	DF	(Spain)	Alan Baró	25	1	8	1	0	24+0	1	7	1	0	1+0	0	1	0	0
16	MF	(Australia)	Liam Rose	19	0	3	0	0	9+9	0	3	0	0	0+1	0	0	0	0
17	FW	(Australia)	Josh Bingham	8	0	1	0	0	0+7	0	0	0	0	1+0	0	1	0	0
18	GK	(Australia)	Tom Glover	4	0	0	0	0	4+0	0	0	0	0	0+0	0	0	0	0
19	DF	(Australia)	Jacob Poscoliero	2	0	0	0	0	2+0	0	0	0	0	0+0	0	0	0	0
20	GK	(Australia)	Adam Pearce	1	0	0	0	0	0+0	0	0	0	0	1+0	0	0	0	0
21	DF	(Australia)	Kye Rowles	11	0	2	0	0	8+3	0	2	0	0	0+0	0	0	0	0
22	MF	(Australia)	Jacob Melling	11	0	3	0	0	7+4	0	3	0	0	0+0	0	0	0	0
23	MF	(Netherlands)	Wout Brama	22	2	2	0	2	21+1	2	2	0	2	0+0	0	0	0	0
24	MF	(Australia)	Lachlan Wales	10	0	2	0	0	7+3	0	2	0	0	0+0	0	0	0	0
25	FW	(Australia)	Peter Kekeris	1	0	0	0	0	0+1	0	0	0	0	0+0	0	0	0	0
27	FW	(Australia)	Peter Skapetis	5	1	1	0	0	2+3	1	1	0	0	0+0	0	0	0	0
28	FW	(Australia)	Jordan Smylie	1	0	0	0	0	0+1	0	0	0	0	0+0	0	0	0	0
Players no longer at the club:
9	FW	(Spain)	Asdrúbal	11	2	2	0	0	10+1	2	2	0	0	0+0	0	0	0	0
13	MF	(Australia)	Kwabena Appiah	19	2	0	0	0	12+6	0	0	0	0	1+0	2	0	0	0
19	DF	(Australia)	Harry Ascroft	0	0	0	0	0	0+0	0	0	0	0	0+0	0	0	0	0

- Last updated: 14 April 2018
- Source: au.soccerway.com
- (yellow card) = Number of bookings; (second yellow card) = Number of sending offs after a second yellow card; (red card) = Number of sending offs by a direct red card.

== Pre-season and friendlies ==
5 July 2017	Central Coast Football All Stars (Australia)	0–6	(Australia) Central Coast Mariners	Lisarow, Australia
19:30 AEST		Report	Hoole 9', 12' (pen.), 24'; Appiah 43'; Stewart 50'; Pain 64'	Stadium: Pluim Park

14 July 2017	Australia U-23	0–0	(Australia) Central Coast Mariners	Sydney, Australia
11:00 AEST		Report		Stadium: Valentine Sport Park

19 July 2017	Central Coast Mariners (Australia)	1–0	(Australia) Hakoah Sydney City East	Lisarow, Australia
19:00 AEST	Hoole 5'	Report		Stadium: Pluim Park

26 July 2017	Central Coast Mariners (Australia)	2–0	(Australia) Newcastle Jets	Tuggerah, Australia
	Bingham; Hoole	Report		Stadium: Central Coast Mariners Centre of Excellence; Attendance: 0 (behind closed doors)

16 August 2017	Melbourne City (Australia)	3–2	(Australia) Central Coast Mariners	Melbourne, Australia
	Arzani 11'; Fitzgerald 53'; Fornaroli 61'	Report	Hoole 23', 55'	Stadium: City Football Academy; Attendance: 0 (behind closed doors)

31 August 2017	Central Coast Mariners (Australia)	3–0	China U-22	Gold Coast, Australia
11:00 AEST	Brama 26'; McGing 40'; Asdrúbal 90'	Report		Stadium: Cbus Super Stadium

12 September 2017	Central Coast Mariners (Australia)	1–0	(New Zealand) Wellington Phoenix	Lisarow, Australia
19:00 AEST	Pain 7'	Report		Stadium: Pluim Park; Attendance: 1,350; Referee: Stephen Lucas

20 September 2017	Melbourne Victory (Australia)	0–2	(Australia) Central Coast Mariners	Melbourne, Australia
13:30 AEST		Report	Asdrúbal 40'; Brama 72'	Stadium: AAMI Park

28 September 2017	Sydney FC (Australia)	0–0	(Australia) Central Coast Mariners	Sydney, Australia
		Report		Stadium: Allianz Stadium; Referee: Kris Griffiths-Jones

== Competitions ==
=== Overall ===
Competition	Started round	Final position / round	First match	Last match
A-League	—	10th	7 October 2017	13 April 2018
FFA Cup	Round of 32	Round of 32	2 August 2017	2 August 2017

=== A-League ===
==== League table ====
Pos	Team	Pld	W	D	L	GF	GA	GD	Pts	Qualification
1	Sydney FC	27	20	4	3	64	22	+42	64	Qualification for 2019 AFC Champions League group stage and Finals series
2	Newcastle Jets	27	15	5	7	57	37	+20	50	Qualification for 2019 AFC Champions League second preliminary round and Finals series
3	Melbourne City	27	13	4	10	41	33	+8	43	Qualification for Finals series
4	Melbourne Victory (C)	27	12	5	10	43	37	+6	41	Qualification for 2019 AFC Champions League group stage and Finals series
5	Adelaide United	27	11	6	10	36	38	−2	39	Qualification for Finals series
6	Brisbane Roar	27	10	5	12	33	40	−7	35	Qualification for Finals series
7	Western Sydney Wanderers	27	8	9	10	38	47	−9	33	
8	Perth Glory	27	10	2	15	37	50	−13	32	
9	Wellington Phoenix (Note: Wellington Phoenix cannot qualify for the AFC Champions League as they are not recognised as an AFC club.)	27	5	6	16	31	55	−24	21	
10	Central Coast Mariners	27	4	8	15	28	49	−21	20	

Source: A-Leagues
Rules for classification: 1) points; 2) goal difference; 3) number of goals scored.
(C) Champions

==== Results summary ====
Overall								Home						Away					
Pld	W	D	L	GF	GA	GD	Pts	W	D	L	GF	GA	GD	W	D	L	GF	GA	GD
27	4	8	15	28	49	−21	20	3	3	7	14	26	−12	1	5	8	14	23	−9

Last updated: 14 April 2018.
Source: ultimatealeague.com

==== Results by round ====
Round	1	2	3	4	5	6	7	8	9	10	11	12	13	14	15	16	17	18	19	20	21	22	23	24	25	26	27
Ground	H	A	A	H	A	H	H	A	H	A	H	A	H	A	A	H	A	H	H	A	H	A	A	H	A	A	H
Result	L	D	L	D	D	W	L	W	W	L	L	L	D	D	L	D	D	L	L	D	W	L	L	L	L	L	L
Position	10	8	9	9	8	6	9	6	4	5	7	7	9	8	8	8	7	9	9	9	9	9	9	9	9	9	10

Updated to match(es) played on 14 April 2018. Source: ultimatealeague.com
A = Away; H = Home; W = Win; D = Draw; L = Loss

==== Matches ====
7 October 2017 1	Central Coast Mariners	1–5	Newcastle Jets	Gosford
17:35 AEDT	Asdrúbal 5'	Report	O'Donovan 9' (pen.), 28', 38'; Champness 81'; D. Petratos 90'	Stadium: Central Coast Stadium; Attendance: 12,044; Referee: Jonathan Barreiro

14 October 2017 2	Western Sydney Wanderers	2–2	Central Coast Mariners	Sydney
17:35 AEDT	Riera 39' (pen.); Bonevacia 69'	Report	Asdrúbal 22'; De Silva 63'	Stadium: Spotless Stadium; Attendance: 11,650; Referee: Chris Beath

22 October 2017 3	Perth Glory	2–1	Central Coast Mariners	Perth
16:00 AWST	Keogh 70'; Taggart 85'	Report	Brama 15'	Stadium: nib Stadium; Attendance: 12,167; Referee: Alex King

29 October 2017 4	Central Coast Mariners	1–1	Melbourne Victory	Gosford
19:00 AEDT	Pain 58'	Report	George 66'	Stadium: Central Coast Stadium; Attendance: 5,519; Referee: Adam Fielding

5 November 2017 5	Brisbane Roar	0–0	Central Coast Mariners	Brisbane
16:00 AEST		Report		Stadium: Suncorp Stadium; Attendance: 11,485; Referee: Daniel Elder

10 November 2017 6	Central Coast Mariners	2–0	Sydney FC	Gosford
19:50 AEDT	Hoole 19'; McGing 55'	Report		Stadium: Central Coast Stadium; Attendance: 7,873; Referee: Adam Kersey

16 November 2017 7	Central Coast Mariners	1–2	Adelaide United	Gosford
19:50 AEDT	Brama 40' (pen.)	Report	Adlung 59'; Kitto 90+3'	Stadium: Central Coast Stadium; Attendance: 5,073; Referee: Matthew Conger

25 November 2017 8	Wellington Phoenix	1–4	Central Coast Mariners	Wellington
19:35 NZDT	Vidošić 71'	Report	Kaluđerović 39' (o.g.); De Silva 54'; Hoole 67'; Buhagiar 90+3'	Stadium: Westpac Stadium; Attendance: 5,679; Referee: Peter Green

3 December 2017 9	Central Coast Mariners	1–0	Perth Glory	Gosford
17:00 AEDT	Powell 78'	Report		Stadium: Central Coast Stadium; Attendance: 8,115; Referee: Kris Griffiths-Jones

10 December 2017 10	Melbourne City	1–0	Central Coast Mariners	Melbourne
19:00 AEDT	McCormack 59'	Report		Stadium: AAMI Park; Attendance: 7,170; Referee: Jarred Gillett

16 December 2017 11	Central Coast Mariners	0–2	Western Sydney Wanderers	Gosford
19:50 AEDT		Report	Santalab 27'; Cejudo 50'	Stadium: Central Coast Stadium; Attendance: 7,199; Referee: Alex King

26 December 2017 12	Adelaide United	1–0	Central Coast Mariners	Adelaide
19:20 ACDT	Kitto 14'	Report		Stadium: Coopers Stadium; Attendance: 10,313; Referee: Peter Green

31 December 2017 13	Central Coast Mariners	0–0	Wellington Phoenix	Gosford
19:00 AEDT		Report		Stadium: Central Coast Stadium; Attendance: 9,110; Referee: Daniel Elder

6 January 2018 14	Melbourne Victory	1–1	Central Coast Mariners	Geelong
18:00 AEDT	Berisha 49'	Report	Powell 71'	Stadium: GMHBA Stadium; Attendance: 8,370; Referee: Jonathan Barreiro

9 January 2018 15	Newcastle Jets	2–0	Central Coast Mariners	Newcastle
19:50 AEDT	D. Petratos 82'; Rodríguez 90+2'	Report		Stadium: McDonald Jones Stadium; Attendance: 13,127; Referee: Kurt Ams

14 January 2018 16	Central Coast Mariners	2–2	Melbourne City	Gosford
17:00 AEDT	Baró 13'; McGing 50'	Report	McCormack 42'; Budziński 86'	Stadium: Central Coast Stadium; Attendance: 6,263; Referee: Adam Kersey

20 January 2018 17	Sydney FC	1–1	Central Coast Mariners	Sydney
19:50 AEDT	Bobô 61'	Report	Powell 7' (pen.)	Stadium: Allianz Stadium; Attendance: 13,511; Referee: Daniel Elder

27 January 2018 18	Central Coast Mariners	1–2	Brisbane Roar	Gosford
19:50 AEDT	Powell 63'	Report	Holman 23'; McKay 54'	Stadium: Central Coast Stadium; Attendance: 5,264; Referee: Adam Kersey

4 February 2018 19	Central Coast Mariners	1–2	Western Sydney Wanderers	Gosford
17:00 AEDT	Skapetis 76'	Report	Sotirio 14'; Riera 30'	Stadium: Central Coast Stadium; Attendance: 7,046; Referee: Peter Green

17 February 2018 20	Adelaide United	2–2	Central Coast Mariners	Adelaide
19:20 ACDT	Elsey 61'; Blackwood 83'	Report	Hoole 7'; Strain 53' (o.g.)	Stadium: Coopers Stadium; Attendance: 8,262; Referee: Shaun Evans

23 February 2018 21	Central Coast Mariners	1–0	Wellington Phoenix	Gosford
19:50 AEDT	De Silva 45+1'	Report		Stadium: Central Coast Stadium; Attendance: 4,973; Referee: Kris Griffiths-Jones

10 March 2018 22	Perth Glory	3–1	Central Coast Mariners	Perth
19:00 AWST	Chianese 29', 61'; Torres 89'	Report	Hoole 71'	Stadium: nib Stadium; Attendance: 7,277; Referee: Kurt Ams

18 March 2018 23	Melbourne Victory	5–2	Central Coast Mariners	Melbourne
17:00 AEDT	George 15'; Berisha 25', 54', 74'; Theoharous 83'	Report	Pain 87', 90+7'	Stadium: AAMI Park; Attendance: 14,076; Referee: Jarred Gillett

24 March 2018 24	Central Coast Mariners	1–2	Sydney FC	Gosford
17:35 AEDT	McGing 82'	Report	Ninković 32'; Simon 90+3'	Stadium: Central Coast Stadium; Attendance: 7,082; Referee: Peter Green

31 March 2018 25	Brisbane Roar	1–0	Central Coast Mariners	Brisbane
16:35 AEST	Henrique 13'	Report		Stadium: Suncorp Stadium; Attendance: 12,019; Referee: Jonathan Barreiro

7 April 2018 26	Melbourne City	1–0	Central Coast Mariners	Melbourne
19:50 AEST	Fornaroli 49'	Report		Stadium: AAMI Park; Attendance: 8,156; Referee: Alex King

14 April 2018 27	Central Coast Mariners	2–8	Newcastle Jets	Gosford
19:50 AEST	Pain 39'; Buhagiar 80'	Report	Champness 10'; O'Donovan 20', 68' (pen.); McGree 23', 53', 68'; Jackson 61'; D. Petratos 81'	Stadium: Central Coast Stadium; Attendance: 7,604; Referee: Jarred Gillett

=== FFA Cup ===
2 August 2017 Round of 32	Blacktown City	3–2	Central Coast Mariners	Sydney
19:30 AEST	Gibbs 2', 82'; Speranza 17'	Report	Appiah 32', 54'	Stadium: Lily's Football Centre; Attendance: 1,667; Referee: Adrian Arndt
