= 2016–17 Central Coast Mariners FC season =

Central Coast Mariners
2016–17 season
- Chairman: Michael Charlesworth
- Manager: Tony Walmsley (to 8 August 2016); John Hutchinson (caretaker 8–29 August 2016); Paul Okon (from 29 August 2016)
- Stadium: Central Coast Stadium, Gosford
- A-League: 8th
- A-League Finals Series: DNQ
- FFA Cup: Round of 32
- Top goalscorer: League: Roy O'Donovan (11 goals); All: Roy O'Donovan (11 goals)
- Highest home attendance: 11,398 vs. Sydney FC (8 January 2017)
- Lowest home attendance: 5,072 vs. Adelaide United (5 February 2016)
- Average home league attendance: 7,395
Home colours	Away colours

The 2016–17 Central Coast Mariners FC season was the club's 12th season since its establishment in 2004. The club participated in the A-League for the 12th time and the FFA Cup for the 3rd time.

== Players ==
=== Squad information ===
Note: Flags indicate national team as defined under FIFA eligibility rules; some limited exceptions apply. Players may hold more than one non-FIFA nationality.

No.	Pos.	Nation	Player
1	GK	AUS	Ivan Necevski
2	DF	NZL	Storm Roux
3	DF	AUS	Scott Galloway
4	MF	AUS	Jacob Poscoliero
5	DF	AUS	Harry Ascroft
6	FW	AUS	Blake Powell
7	MF	POR	Fábio Ferreira
8	MF	SCO	Nick Montgomery (Captain)
9	FW	IRL	Roy O'Donovan
10	MF	SEN	Mickaël Tavares
11	MF	AUS	Connor Pain

No.	Pos.	Nation	Player
12	FW	AUS	Trent Buhagiar
13	MF	AUS	Kwabena Appiah
14	MF	AUS	Adam Berry
16	MF	AUS	Liam Rose
17	FW	AUS	Josh Bingham
19	DF	SEN	Jacques Faty
20	GK	AUS	Paul Izzo
21	DF	AUS	Michael Neill
22	MF	AUS	Jake McGing
23	DF	AUS	Jake Adelson (Youth)
30	GK	AUS	Adam Pearce (Youth)

=== From youth squad ===
N	Pos.	Nat.	Name	Age	Notes
14	DF	(Australia)	Adam Berry	19	
23	DF	(Australia)	Jake Adelson	20	
30	GK	(Australia)	Adam Pearce	20	

=== Transfers in ===
No.	Position	Player	Transferred from	Type/fee	Contract length	Date	Ref
19	DF	(Senegal) Jacques Faty	Sydney FC	Free transfer	1 year	11 April 2016	
10	MF	(Senegal) Mickaël Tavares	Sydney FC	Free transfer	1 year	18 April 2016	
1	GK	Ivan Necevski	Sydney FC	Free transfer	1 year	7 June 2016	
11	MF	Connor Pain	Melbourne Victory	Free transfer	2 years	7 June 2016	
6	FW	Blake Powell	Unattached	Free transfer	2 years	14 July 2016	
13	MF	Kwabena Appiah	Unattached	Free transfer	1 year	14 July 2016	
3	DF	Scott Galloway	Melbourne Victory	Free transfer	1 year	19 October 2016	

=== Transfers out ===
No.	Position	Player	Transferred to	Type/fee	Date	Ref
10	MF	(Spain) Luis García	Unattached	Undisclosed Fee	5 April 2016	
14	FW	(England) Daniel Heffernan	Unattached	Free transfer	11 April 2016	
17	FW	Francesco Stella	Unattached	Free transfer	11 April 2016	
23	DF	Tomislav Uskok	(Australia) Sydney United 58	Undisclosed Fee	11 April 2016	
20	MF	Anthony Kalik	(Croatia) Hajduk Split	$50,000	28 May 2016	
13	GK	Alastair Bray	Melbourne Victory	Free transfer	7 June 2016	
6	MF	Mitch Austin	Melbourne Victory	Free transfer	16 June 2016	
3	DF	Joshua Rose	Melbourne City	Free transfer	11 August 2016	
40	GK	Tom Heward-Belle	Unattached	Undisclosed Fee	1 December 2016	
18	FW	Matthew Fletcher	Unattached	Undisclosed Fee	14 January 2017	
15	DF	(Papua New Guinea) Brad McDonald	Unattached	Undisclosed Fee	14 January 2017	

=== Contracts extensions ===
Name	Position	Duration	Contract Expiry	Notes
(Australia) Adam Berry	Midfielder	2 years	2019	
(Australia) Liam Rose	Midfielder	1 year	2018	
(Australia) Trent Buhagiar	Striker	2 years	2019	
(New Zealand) Storm Roux	Right back	2 years	2019	
(Australia) Josh Bingham	Striker	1 year	2018	

== Club ==
=== Coaching staff ===
Position	Staff
Head coach	(Australia) Paul Okon
Assistant coach	(Australia) Ivan Jolic
Goalkeeping coach	(Australia) Matthew Nash
Strength and conditioning coach	(Australia) Brice Johnson
Physiotherapist	(Australia) Andrew Nealon
Youth football coach	(Australia) Ben Cahn
Head of sports science	(Australia) Tim Knight

=== Other information ===
Majority Owner/Chairman	(England) Michael Charlesworth
Executive Vice Chairman	(England) Peter Storrie
Chief Executive Officer	(Australia) Shaun Mielekamp
Ground (capacity and dimensions)	Central Coast Stadium (20,059 / 105x68 metres)

Source: ccmariners.com.au

== Statistics ==
=== Squad statistics ===
N	Pos.	Nat.	Name	Total					A-League					FFA Cup
N	Pos.	Nat.	Name	Apps	Goals	Yellow card	Second yellow card	Red card	Apps	Goals	Yellow card	Second yellow card	Red card	Apps	Goals	Yellow card	Second yellow card	Red card
1	GK	(Australia)	Ivan Necevski	8	0	0	0	0	6+1	0	0	0	0	1	0	0	0	0
2	DF	(New Zealand)	Storm Roux	24	0	2	0	0	24	0	2	0	0	0	0	0	0	0
3	DF	(Australia)	Scott Galloway	24	2	1	0	0	23+1	2	1	0	0	0	0	0	0	0
4	MF	(Australia)	Jacob Poscoliero	9	0	2	0	0	9	0	2	0	0	0	0	0	0	0
5	DF	(Australia)	Harry Ascroft	14	1	2	0	0	10+3	1	2	0	0	1	0	0	0	0
6	FW	(Australia)	Blake Powell	18	2	3	0	0	14+3	1	3	0	0	1	1	0	0	0
7	MF	(Portugal)	Fábio Ferreira	26	5	2	0	0	22+3	5	1	0	0	1	0	1	0	0
8	MF	(Scotland)	Nick Montgomery	23	1	8	0	0	22	1	8	0	0	1	0	0	0	0
9	FW	(Republic of Ireland)	Roy O'Donovan	27	11	5	0	1	26	11	5	0	1	1	0	0	0	0
10	MF	(Senegal)	Mickaël Tavares	9	0	2	0	0	7+1	0	1	0	0	0+1	0	1	0	0
11	MF	(Australia)	Connor Pain	28	1	2	0	0	24+3	1	2	0	0	0+1	0	0	0	0
12	FW	(Australia)	Trent Buhagiar	27	2	1	0	0	11+16	2	1	0	0	0	0	0	0	0
13	MF	(Australia)	Kwabena Appiah	20	2	1	0	0	8+11	2	1	0	0	0+1	0	0	0	0
14	DF	(Australia)	Adam Berry	23	1	2	0	0	13+9	1	2	0	0	1	0	0	0	0
16	MF	(Australia)	Liam Rose	23	0	2	1	0	18+4	0	2	1	0	1	0	0	0	0
17	MF	(Australia)	Josh Bingham	14	1	0	0	0	2+11	1	0	0	0	1	0	0	0	0
19	DF	(Senegal)	Jacques Faty	8	0	4	0	0	7+1	0	4	0	0	0	0	0	0	0
20	GK	(Australia)	Paul Izzo	21	0	1	0	1	21	0	1	0	1	0	0	0	0	0
21	DF	(Australia)	Michael Neill	18	0	2	0	0	6+11	0	2	0	0	1	0	0	0	0
22	MF	(Australia)	Jake McGing	27	1	3	0	0	25+1	1	3	0	0	1	0	0	0	0
23	DF	(Australia)	Jake Adelson	0	0	0	0	0	0	0	0	0	0	0	0	0	0	0
25	MF	(Australia)	Ryan Peterson	1	0	0	0	0	0+1	0	0	0	0	0	0	0	0	0
26	MF	(Australia)	Steve Whyte	0	0	0	0	0	0	0	0	0	0	0	0	0	0	0
27	MF	(Australia)	Lachlan Wales	1	0	0	0	0	0+1	0	0	0	0	0	0	0	0	0
30	GK	(Australia)	Adam Pearce	0	0	0	0	0	0	0	0	0	0	0	0	0	0	0
Players no longer at the club:
15	DF	(Papua New Guinea)	Brad McDonald	0	0	0	0	0	0	0	0	0	0	0	0	0	0	0
18	FW	(Australia)	Matthew Fletcher	0	0	0	0	0	0	0	0	0	0	0	0	0	0	0
40	GK	(Australia)	Tom Heward-Belle	0	0	0	0	0	0	0	0	0	0	0	0	0	0	0

- Last updated: 14 April 2017
- Source: au.soccerway.com
- (yellow card) = Number of bookings; (second yellow card) = Number of sending offs after a second yellow card; (red card) = Number of sending offs by a direct red card.

== Pre-season and friendlies ==
12 July 2016	Central Coast Mariners (Australia)	9–0	(Australia) Central Coast Football XI	Lisarow, Australia
18:00 AEST	Powell 6'; Ferreira 8', 64'; O'Donovan 24', 26', 47', 54', 85'; Giverin 61'	Report		Stadium: Pluim Park; Attendance: 1,300; Referee: Steve Lucas

12 July 2016	Central Coast Mariners (Australia)	2–1	(Australia) Central Coast Mariners Academy	Lisarow, Australia
20:00 AEST	Appiah 10'; Cholakian 63'	Report	Hornery 77'	Stadium: Pluim Park; Attendance: 1,300; Referee: Steve Lucas

21 July 2016	Central Coast Mariners (Australia)	2–2	(Australia) Young Socceroos	Gosford, Australia
	O'Donovan 16'; Ferreira 44' (pen.)	Report	Prasad 23'; Maia 29'	Stadium: Central Coast Stadium; Attendance: 0 (behind closed doors)

27 July 2016	Central Coast Mariners (Australia)	1–1	(Australia) Newcastle Jets	Tuggerah, Australia
	O'Donovan	Report	W. Brown	Stadium: Central Coast Mariners Centre of Excellence

13 August 2016	Newcastle Jets (Australia)	1–2	(Australia) Central Coast Mariners	Tamworth, Australia
16:00 AEST	Clut 36'	Report	Powell 39'; Pain 50'	Stadium: Scully Park Regional Sporting Precinct; Attendance: 2,154

17 August 2016	Central Coast Mariners (Australia)	5–0	(Australia) Rydalmere FC	Tuggerah, Australia
14:00 AEST	McGing 68'; Buhagiar 77', 83'; Fletcher 82', 86' (pen.)	Report		Stadium: Central Coast Mariners Centre of Excellence

25 August 2016	Central Coast Mariners (Australia)	2–1	(Australia) Young Socceroos	Gosford, Australia
	McGing 75'; Lyons 90'	Report	Antoniou 23'	Stadium: Central Coast Stadium; Attendance: 0 (behind closed doors)

6 September 2016	Capital North Region Select (Australia)	2–2	(Australia) Central Coast Mariners	Canberra, Australia
18:00 AEST	Tsekenis 16', 38'	Report	O'Donovan 18' (pen.); Appiah 63'	Stadium: Woden Park

6 September 2016	Capital South Region Select (Australia)	0–4	(Australia) Central Coast Mariners	Canberra, Australia
19:45 AEST		Report	Bingham 47', 67', 70', 72'	Stadium: Woden Park

10 September 2016	Brisbane Roar (Australia)	Cancelled	(Australia) Central Coast Mariners	Brisbane, Australia
16:00 AEST		Cancellation		Stadium: Corporate Travel Management Stadium

17 September 2016	Central Coast Mariners (Australia)	0–1	(New Zealand) Wellington Phoenix	Wahroonga, Australia
15:00 AEST		Report	Watson 38'	Stadium: Knox Grammar School; Attendance: 1,500

24 September 2016	Wellington Phoenix (New Zealand)	2–1	(Australia) Central Coast Mariners	Nelson, New Zealand
16:00 NZST	Barbarouses 22' (pen.); Krishna 49'	Report	Pain 31'	Stadium: Trafalgar Park

== Competitions ==
=== Overview ===
Competition	First match	Last match	Starting round	Final position	Record							
Competition	First match	Last match	Starting round	Final position	Pld	W	D	L	GF	GA	GD	Win %
A-League	8 October 2016	14 April 2017	Matchday 1	8th	27	6	5	16	31	52	−21	22.22
FFA Cup	2 August 2016		Round of 32	Round of 32	1	0	0	1	1	2	−1	0.00
Total					28	6	5	17	32	54	−22	21.43

Source: Competitions

=== A-League ===
==== League table ====
Pos	Team	Pld	W	D	L	GF	GA	GD	Pts	Qualification
1	Sydney FC (C)	27	20	6	1	55	12	+43	66	Qualification for 2018 AFC Champions League group stage and Finals series
2	Melbourne Victory	27	15	4	8	49	31	+18	49	Qualification for 2018 AFC Champions League group stage and Finals series
3	Brisbane Roar	27	11	9	7	43	37	+6	42	Qualification for 2018 AFC Champions League second preliminary round and Finals series
4	Melbourne City	27	11	6	10	49	44	+5	39	Qualification for Finals series
5	Perth Glory	27	10	9	8	53	53	0	39	Qualification for Finals series
6	Western Sydney Wanderers	27	8	12	7	35	35	0	36	Qualification for Finals series
7	Wellington Phoenix (Note: Wellington Phoenix cannot qualify for the AFC Champions League as they are not recognised as an AFC club.)	27	8	6	13	41	46	−5	30	
8	Central Coast Mariners	27	6	5	16	31	52	−21	23	
9	Adelaide United	27	5	8	14	25	46	−21	23	
10	Newcastle Jets	27	5	7	15	28	53	−25	22	

Source: A-Leagues
Rules for classification: 1) points; 2) goal difference; 3) number of goals scored.
(C) Champions

==== Results summary ====
Overall								Home						Away					
Pld	W	D	L	GF	GA	GD	Pts	W	D	L	GF	GA	GD	W	D	L	GF	GA	GD
27	6	5	16	31	52	−21	23	4	1	8	18	24	−6	2	4	8	13	28	−15

Last updated: 14 April 2017.
Source: ultimatealeague.com

==== Results by round ====
Round	1	2	3	4	5	6	7	8	9	10	11	12	13	14	15	16	17	18	19	20	21	22	23	24	25	26	27
Ground	A	A	H	A	A	H	A	H	H	A	H	A	H	H	A	A	H	H	A	H	A	H	A	H	A	H	A
Result	D	L	L	D	W	L	D	W	L	L	L	L	D	L	L	L	W	W	W	L	D	L	L	L	L	W	L
Position	3	8	9	8	8	9	9	6	7	9	9	9	9	9	10	10	9	9	9	9	9	9	9	10	10	8	8

Updated to match(es) played on 15 April 2017. Source: ultimatealeague.com
A = Away; H = Home; W = Win; D = Draw; L = Loss

==== Matches ====
8 October 2016 1	Perth Glory	3–3	Central Coast Mariners	Perth
Saturday 19:00 AWST	Taggart 4', 27'; Castro 35' (pen.)	Report	O'Donovan 56', 86' (pen.); Reddy 84' (o.g.)	Stadium: nib Stadium; Attendance: 9,501; Referee: Chris Beath

15 October 2016 2	Sydney FC	4–0	Central Coast Mariners	Sydney
Saturday 17:35 AEDT	Hološko 18', 65' (pen.); Bobô 38'; Brosque 70'	Report		Stadium: Allianz Stadium; Attendance: 15,082; Referee: Stephen Lucas

22 October 2016 3	Central Coast Mariners	0–1	Brisbane Roar	Gosford
Saturday 17:35 AEDT		Report	Kristensen 33'	Stadium: Central Coast Stadium; Attendance: 7,073; Referee: Adam Fielding

29 October 2016 4	Western Sydney Wanderers	1–1	Central Coast Mariners	Sydney
Saturday 19:50 AEDT	Šantalab 2'	Report	Berry 61'	Stadium: Spotless Stadium; Attendance: 12,168; Referee: Shaun Evans

6 November 2016 5	Adelaide United	1–2	Central Coast Mariners	Adelaide
Sunday 16:30 ACDT	Guardiola 27' (pen.)	Report	O'Donovan 47'; Pain 57'	Stadium: Coopers Stadium; Attendance: 10,974; Referee: Jarred Gillett

12 November 2016 6	Central Coast Mariners	0–2	Wellington Phoenix	Canberra
Saturday 17:35 AEDT		Report	Krishna 49'; Watson 56'	Stadium: GIO Stadium; Attendance: 5,497; Referee: Stephen Lucas

20 November 2016 7	Newcastle Jets	1–1	Central Coast Mariners	Newcastle
Sunday 17:00 AEDT	Nordstrand 64'	Report	McGing 42'	Stadium: McDonald Jones Stadium; Attendance: 11,238; Referee: Jonathan Barreiro

24 November 2016 8	Central Coast Mariners	2–0	Perth Glory	Gosford
Thursday 19:50 AEDT	Ascroft 30'; O'Donovan 63'	Report		Stadium: Central Coast Stadium; Attendance: 5,296; Referee: Shaun Evans

3 December 2016 9	Central Coast Mariners	1–4	Western Sydney Wanderers	Gosford
Saturday 17:35 AEDT	Powell 5'	Report	Kusukami 6'; N. Martínez 30'; McGing 50' (o.g.); Šantalab 88'	Stadium: Central Coast Stadium; Attendance: 11,075; Referee: Kris Griffiths-Jones

10 December 2016 10	Wellington Phoenix	3–0	Central Coast Mariners	Hamilton
Saturday 15:35 NZDT	Watson 2'; Lia 66'; Krishna 90+4'	Report		Stadium: Waikato Stadium; Attendance: 5,234; Referee: Matthew Conger

18 December 2016 11	Central Coast Mariners	1–2	Brisbane Roar	Gosford
Sunday 17:00 AEDT	O'Donovan 57'	Report	D. Petratos 33'; Maclaren 76'	Stadium: Central Coast Stadium; Attendance: 6,063; Referee: Chris Beath

28 December 2016 12	Melbourne Victory	4–1	Central Coast Mariners	Melbourne
Wednesday 19:50 AEDT	McGing 28' (o.g.); Donachie 51'; Rojas 58', 59'	Report	Buhagiar 89'	Stadium: AAMI Park; Attendance: 20,491; Referee: Adam Fielding

31 December 2016 13	Central Coast Mariners	2–2	Melbourne City	Gosford
Saturday 19:00 AEDT	Buhagiar 77'; O'Donovan 85'	Report	Cahill 40'; Fornaroli 90' (pen.)	Stadium: Central Coast Stadium; Attendance: 11,184; Referee: Jonathan Barreiro

8 January 2017 14	Central Coast Mariners	2–3	Sydney FC	Gosford
Saturday 17:00 AEDT	O'Donovan 66'; Galloway 76'	Report	Bobô 43', 48'; Carney 77'	Stadium: Central Coast Stadium; Attendance: 11,398; Referee: Chris Beath

14 January 2017 15	Wellington Phoenix	1–0	Central Coast Mariners	Wellington
Saturday 15:35 NZDT	McGlinchey 9'	Report		Stadium: Westpac Stadium; Attendance: 6,061; Referee: Jarred Gillett

19 January 2017 16	Melbourne City	2–1	Central Coast Mariners	Melbourne
Thursday 19:50 AEDT	Cahill 3', 39'	Report	O'Donovan 9'	Stadium: AAMI Park; Attendance: 8,784; Referee: Daniel Elder

28 January 2017 17	Central Coast Mariners	2–0	Perth Glory	Gosford
Saturday 17:35 AEDT	Bingham 48'; Ferreira 52' (pen.)	Report		Stadium: Central Coast Stadium; Attendance: 7,205; Referee: Kris Griffiths-Jones

5 February 2017 18	Central Coast Mariners	2–1	Adelaide United	Canberra
Sunday 17:00 AEDT	Ferreira 37'; Appiah 79'	Report	O'Doherty 90+2'	Stadium: GIO Stadium; Attendance: 5,072; Referee: Shaun Evans

12 February 2017 19	Western Sydney Wanderers	0–2	Central Coast Mariners	Sydney
Sunday 17:00 AEDT		Report	O'Donovan 65' (pen.), 78'	Stadium: Spotless Stadium; Attendance: 9,618; Referee: Kris Griffiths-Jones

19 February 2017 20	Central Coast Mariners	0–3	Melbourne Victory	Gosford
Sunday 17:00 AEDT		Report	Berisha 25', 90+1'; Troisi 58'	Stadium: Central Coast Stadium; Attendance: 7,013; Referee: Daniel Elder

26 February 2017 21	Newcastle Jets	1–1	Central Coast Mariners	Newcastle
Sunday 17:00 AEDT	Kokko 20'	Report	Galloway 50'	Stadium: McDonald Jones Stadium; Attendance: 9,423; Referee: Shaun Evans

5 March 2017 22	Central Coast Mariners	2–3	Melbourne City	Gosford
Sunday 17:00 AEDT	Ferreira 45'; Tongyik 47' (o.g.)	Report	Fornaroli 4', 64' (pen.); Montgomery 16' (o.g.)	Stadium: Central Coast Stadium; Attendance: 5,974; Referee: Adam Fielding

10 March 2017 23	Sydney FC	1–0	Central Coast Mariners	Sydney
Friday 19:50 AEDT	Hološko 8'	Report		Stadium: Allianz Stadium; Attendance: 11,148; Referee: Shaun Evans

25 March 2017 24	Central Coast Mariners	2–3	Adelaide United	Gosford
Saturday 17:35 AEDT	Appiah 44'; O'Donovan 90' (pen.)	Report	Diawara 56', 66'; McGowan 60'	Stadium: Central Coast Stadium; Attendance: 5,438; Referee: Kurt Ams

2 April 2017 25	Brisbane Roar	5–1	Central Coast Mariners	Brisbane
Sunday 19:00 AEST	Maclaren 62', 66', 70'; Broich 83'; D'Agostino 90+1'	Report	Ferreira 48'	Stadium: Suncorp Stadium; Attendance: 8,113; Referee: Daniel Elder

9 April 2017 26	Central Coast Mariners	2–0	Newcastle Jets	Gosford
Sunday 17:00 AEST	Montgomery 32'; Ferreira 51'	Report		Stadium: Central Coast Stadium; Attendance: 8,073; Referee: Stephen Lucas

14 April 2017 27	Melbourne Victory	1–0	Central Coast Mariners	Melbourne
Friday 19:50 AEST	Berisha 80'	Report		Stadium: AAMI Park; Attendance: 14,827; Referee: Jarred Gillett

=== FFA Cup ===
2 August 2016 Round of 32	Green Gully (Victoria (state))	2–1	(New South Wales) Central Coast Mariners	Melbourne
20:00 AEST	Jones 86'; Boland 90+2'	Report	Powell 15'	Stadium: Green Gully Reserve; Attendance: 876; Referee: Daniel Elder
