= 2018–19 Newcastle Jets FC season =

Newcastle Jets
2018–19 season
- Chairman: Martin Lee
- Manager: Ernie Merrick
- Stadium: McDonald Jones Stadium, Newcastle
- A-League: 7th
- FFA Cup: Round of 16
- AFC Champions League: Play-off round
- Top goalscorer: League: Roy O'Donovan (12 goals); All: Roy O'Donovan (12 goals)
- Highest home attendance: 11,814 vs. Melbourne Victory (3 November 2018)
- Lowest home attendance: 6,701 vs. Perth Glory (16 December 2018)
- Average home league attendance: 9,079
Home colours	Away colours	Third colours

The 2018–19 Newcastle Jets FC season was the club's 18th season since its establishment in 2000. The club participated in the A-League for the 14th time, the FFA Cup for the 5th time, and the AFC Champions League for the 2nd time.

== Players ==
=== Squad information ===
Note: Flags indicate national team as defined under FIFA eligibility rules; some limited exceptions apply. Players may hold more than one non-FIFA nationality.

No.	Pos.	Nation	Player
1	GK	NZL	Glen Moss
3	DF	AUS	Jason Hoffman
4	DF	AUS	Nigel Boogaard (Captain)
5	MF	AUS	Ben Kantarovski
6	MF	AUS	Steven Ugarkovic
7	FW	AUS	Dimitri Petratos
8	FW	BRA	Jair
9	FW	IRL	Roy O'Donovan
10	MF	VEN	Ronald Vargas
11	MF	NZL	Kwabena Appiah (Injury replacement player)
13	DF	AUS	Ivan Vujica
14	FW	ENG	Kaine Sheppard
16	MF	AUS	Nick Cowburn

No.	Pos.	Nation	Player
17	DF	MKD	Daniel Georgievski
18	DF	AUS	John Koutroumbis
19	FW	AUS	Kosta Petratos
20	GK	AUS	Lewis Italiano
22	DF	AUS	Lachlan Jackson
23	MF	NZL	Matthew Ridenton
24	FW	AUS	Joe Champness
28	DF	AUS	Patrick Langlois (Scholarship)
29	DF	AUS	Jake Adelson
32	MF	AUS	Angus Thurgate
34	MF	AUS	Jack Simmons (Scholarship)
40	GK	AUS	Noah James (Scholarship)
44	DF	AUS	Nikolai Topor-Stanley (Vice-captain)

== Transfers ==
=== Transfers in ===
No.	Position	Player	Transferred from	Type/fee	Contract length	Date	Ref
23	MF	(New Zealand) Matthew Ridenton	Wellington Phoenix	Free transfer	2 years	9 May 2018	
11	FW	Mitch Austin		Free transfer	1 year	30 August 2018	
8	FW	(Brazil) Jair		Free transfer	1 year	10 September 2018	
14	FW	(England) Kaine Sheppard	(Australia) Avondale	Free transfer	1 year	19 September 2018	
20	GK	Lewis Italiano	(Australia) Stirling Lions	Free transfer	1 year	26 September 2018	
11	MF	(New Zealand) Kwabena Appiah		Injury replacement loan	3 months	8 March 2019	

=== Transfers out ===
No.	Position	Player	Transferred to	Type/fee	Date	Ref
11	FW	(Argentina) Patito Rodríguez		End of contract	16 May 2018	
27	MF	Riley McGree	(Belgium) Club Brugge	Loan return	4 June 2018	
12	MF	Mario Shabow	Central Coast Mariners	Free transfer	7 June 2018	
10	MF	(England) Wayne Brown		Mutual contract termination	23 July 2018	
1	GK	Jack Duncan	(Saudi Arabia) Al-Qadsiah	$450,000	30 July 2018	
11	FW	Mitch Austin	Sydney FC	Free transfer	31 January 2019	

=== From youth squad ===
N	Pos.	Nat.	Name	Age	Notes
32	MF	(Australia)	Angus Thurgate	18	3 year senior contract
34	MF	(Australia)	Jack Simmons	16	3 year scholarship contract
40	GK	(Australia)	Noah James	17	1 year scholarship contract

=== Contract extensions ===
No.	Name	Position	Duration	Date	Notes
10	(Venezuela) Ronald Vargas	Midfielder	1 year	14 May 2018	
3	Jason Hoffman	Right-back	1 year	2 October 2018	
4	Nigel Boogaard	Centre-back	1 year	2 October 2018	
7	Dimitri Petratos	Forward	4 years	4 October 2018	
6	Steven Ugarkovic	Midfielder	3 years	8 October 2018	
18	John Koutroumbis	Defender	3 years	16 January 2019	
14	(England) Kaine Sheppard	Forward	1 year	21 January 2019	
22	Lachlan Jackson	Defender	2 years	30 January 2019	
20	(New Zealand) Glen Moss	Goalkeeper	1 year	26 February 2019	
44	Nikolai Topor-Stanley	Centre-back	2 years	5 March 2019	
20	Lewis Italiano	Goalkeeper	1 year	21 March 2019	

== Technical staff ==
Position	Name
Head Coach	(Scotland) Ernie Merrick
Assistant Coach	(Australia) Clayton Zane
Youth Coach	(Australia) Labinot Haliti
Assistant Youth Coach	(Scotland) Lawrie McKinna
Goalkeeping Coach	(Australia) Chris Bowling
Physiotherapist	(Australia) Nathan Renwick

== Squad statistics ==
=== Appearances and goals ===
N	Pos.	Nat.	Name	Total					A-League					FFA Cup					AFC Champions League
N	Pos.	Nat.	Name	Apps	Goals	Yellow card	Second yellow card	Red card	Apps	Goals	Yellow card	Second yellow card	Red card	Apps	Goals	Yellow card	Second yellow card	Red card	Apps	Goals	Yellow card	Second yellow card	Red card
1	GK	(New Zealand)	Glen Moss	24	0	1	0	0	20+0	0	1	0	0	2+0	0	0	0	0	2+0	0	0	0	0
3	DF	(Australia)	Jason Hoffman	18	3	5	0	1	14+2	3	5	0	1	2+0	0	0	0	0	0+0	0	0	0	0
4	DF	(Australia)	Nigel Boogaard	25	1	6	0	0	22+0	0	6	0	0	1+0	0	0	0	0	2+0	1	0	0	0
5	MF	(Australia)	Ben Kantarovski	19	0	2	0	0	12+4	0	2	0	0	1+0	0	0	0	0	2+0	0	0	0	0
6	MF	(Australia)	Steven Ugarkovic	28	0	2	0	0	22+2	0	2	0	0	2+0	0	0	0	0	2+0	0	0	0	0
7	MF	(Australia)	Dimitri Petratos	27	4	1	0	0	22+1	4	1	0	0	2+0	0	0	0	0	2+0	0	0	0	0
8	FW	(Brazil)	Jair	20	2	0	0	0	16+4	2	0	0	0	0+0	0	0	0	0	0+0	0	0	0	0
9	FW	(Republic of Ireland)	Roy O'Donovan	18	9	2	0	0	15+1	9	1	0	0	0+0	0	0	0	0	2+0	0	1	0	0
10	MF	(Venezuela)	Ronald Vargas	22	7	3	1	0	17+2	5	3	1	0	1+0	0	0	0	0	2+0	2	0	0	0
11	MF	(New Zealand)	Kwabena Appiah	1	0	0	0	0	0+1	0	0	0	0	0+0	0	0	0	0	0+0	0	0	0	0
13	DF	(Australia)	Ivan Vujica	13	0	1	0	0	6+6	0	1	0	0	0+1	0	0	0	0	0+0	0	0	0	0
14	FW	(England)	Kaine Sheppard	22	3	1	0	0	6+14	3	1	0	0	0+0	0	0	0	0	1+1	0	0	0	0
16	MF	(Australia)	Nick Cowburn	12	1	2	0	0	4+6	1	2	0	0	1+0	0	0	0	0	0+1	0	0	0	0
17	DF	(North Macedonia)	Daniel Georgievski	26	0	7	0	0	22+0	0	7	0	0	2+0	0	0	0	0	2+0	0	0	0	0
18	DF	(Australia)	John Koutroumbis	14	1	1	0	0	11+0	1	1	0	0	1+0	0	0	0	0	2+0	0	0	0	0
19	FW	(Australia)	Kosta Petratos	2	0	0	0	0	0+0	0	0	0	0	2+0	0	0	0	0	0+0	0	0	0	0
20	GK	(Australia)	Lewis Italiano	5	0	0	0	0	4+1	0	0	0	0	0+0	0	0	0	0	0+0	0	0	0	0
22	DF	(Australia)	Lachlan Jackson	18	0	2	0	0	12+3	0	2	0	0	1+1	0	0	0	0	0+1	0	0	0	0
23	MF	(New Zealand)	Matthew Ridenton	23	2	1	0	0	13+6	1	1	0	0	2+0	0	0	0	0	1+1	1	0	0	0
24	FW	(Australia)	Joe Champness	8	1	0	0	0	1+5	1	0	0	0	0+1	0	0	0	0	0+1	0	0	0	0
28	DF	(Australia)	Patrick Langlois	1	0	0	0	0	0+0	0	0	0	0	0+1	0	0	0	0	0+0	0	0	0	0
29	DF	(Australia)	Jake Adelson	1	0	1	0	0	0+1	0	1	0	0	0+0	0	0	0	0	0+0	0	0	0	0
32	MF	(Australia)	Angus Thurgate	10	1	0	0	0	1+6	1	0	0	0	0+2	0	0	0	0	0+1	0	0	0	0
34	MF	(Australia)	Jack Simmons	0	0	0	0	0	0+0	0	0	0	0	0+0	0	0	0	0	0+0	0	0	0	0
40	GK	(Australia)	Noah James	0	0	0	0	0	0+0	0	0	0	0	0+0	0	0	0	0	0+0	0	0	0	0
44	DF	(Australia)	Nikolai Topor-Stanley	28	1	4	0	0	24+0	0	3	0	0	2+0	1	1	0	0	2+0	0	0	0	0
Players no longer at the club:
11	FW	(Australia)	Mitch Austin	0	0	0	0	0	0+0	0	0	0	0	0+0	0	0	0	0	0+0	0	0	0	0

- Last updated: 6 April 2019
- Source: Soccerway
- (yellow card) = Number of bookings; (second yellow card) = Number of sending offs after a second yellow card; (red card) = Number of sending offs by a direct red card.

== Pre-season and friendlies ==
6 July 2018 Free Trade Port Super Champions Cup	Shanghai Shenhua (China)	0–2	(Australia) Newcastle Jets	Haikou, China
		Report	Hoffman 25'; Simmons 87'	Stadium: Haikou City Stadium

8 July 2018 Free Trade Port Super Champions Cup	Changchun Yatai (China)	1–1 (a.e.t.) (1–3 p)	(Australia) Newcastle Jets	Haikou, China
	Tan 4'	Report	Ridenton 13'	Stadium: Haikou City Stadium
	Penalties
	(penalty missed) Mierzejewski; (penalty scored) Zhou; (penalty missed) He; (penalty missed) Cheng		(penalty scored) Hoffman; (penalty scored) Koutroumbis; (penalty scored) Kantarovski

17 July 2018 Mid North Coast Pre-Season Tour	Mid North Coast Select (Australia)	0–9	(Australia) Newcastle Jets	Port Macquarie, Australia
19:30 AEST		Report	Georgievski 14'; Hoffman 17', 31', 42'; Boogaard 19', 35'; Champness 36'; Thurgate 65'; Vujica 80'	Stadium: Port Macquarie Regional Stadium; Attendance: 4,200

30 July 2018 Genova International Soccer School Tour	Newcastle Jets (Australia)	2–1	(United Arab Emirates) Al-Ahli	Murcia, Spain
19:00 CEST	Hoffman 40'; K. Petratos 65'	Report	Khalil 21'

1 August 2018 Genova International Soccer School Tour	Newcastle Jets (Australia)	1–2	(Saudi Arabia) Al-Fayha	Murcia, Spain
21:30 CEST	Jackson 75'	Report	Fernández 6'; Al Salem 66'	Stadium: Pinatar Arena Football Centre

3 August 2018 Genova International Soccer School Tour	FC Cartagena (Spain)	3–2	(Australia) Newcastle Jets	Murcia, Spain
	Jackson 7' (o.g.); Cruz 13'; Aketxe 65'	Report	O'Donovan 53' (pen.), 80'	Stadium: Estadio Cartagonova; Attendance: 3,000

25 August 2018	Newcastle Jets (Australia)	2–2	(Australia) Central Coast Mariners	Maitland, Australia
15:30 AEST	Hoffman 40'; O'Donovan 61'	Report	Clisby 10'; Pain 66'	Stadium: No.1 Sportsground; Attendance: 3,500

6 September 2018	Young Socceroos (Australia)	1–4	(Australia) Newcastle Jets	Lisarow, Australia
17:00 AEST	Folami 41'	Report	O'Donovan 10'; Georgievski 53'; Sheppard 77'; M. Petratos 90'	Stadium: Pluim Park; Attendance: 0 (behind closed doors)

12 September 2018	Sydney FC (Australia)	2–1	(Australia) Newcastle Jets	Sydney, Australia
15:00 AEST	Le Fondre 12' (pen.), 55'	Report	Thurgate 32'	Stadium: Leichhardt Oval; Attendance: 0 (behind closed doors)

22 September 2018	Newcastle Jets (Australia)	5–0	(Australia) Edgeworth FC	Newcastle, Australia
12:00 AEST	D. Petratos 3', 9'; Vargas 33'; Hoffman 47', 61'	Report		Stadium: Jack McLaughlan Oval

29 September 2018	Newcastle Jets (Australia)	4–0	(Australia) Western Sydney Wanderers	Maitland, Australia
12:00 AEST	D. Petratos 7'; Boogaard 16'; Vargas 19'; Sheppard 89'	Report		Stadium: No.1 Sportsground; Attendance: 1,600

== Competitions ==
=== Overall ===
Competition	Started round	Final position / round	First match	Last match
A-League	—	7th	21 October 2018	27 April 2019
FFA Cup	Round of 32	Round of 16	7 August 2018	29 August 2018
AFC Champions League	Preliminary round 2	Play-off round	12 February 2019	19 February 2019

=== A-League ===
==== League table ====
Pos	Team	Pld	W	D	L	GF	GA	GD	Pts	Qualification
1	Perth Glory	27	18	6	3	56	23	+33	60	Qualification for 2020 AFC Champions League group stage and Finals series (Note: The top two teams enter the Finals series at the semi-finals, while the teams ranked third to sixth enter the Finals series at the elimination-finals.)
2	Sydney FC (C)	27	16	4	7	43	29	+14	52	Qualification for 2020 AFC Champions League group stage and Finals series
3	Melbourne Victory	27	15	5	7	50	32	+18	50	Qualification for 2020 AFC Champions League preliminary round 2 and Finals series
4	Adelaide United	27	12	8	7	37	32	+5	44	Qualification for Finals series
5	Melbourne City	27	11	7	9	39	32	+7	40	Qualification for Finals series
6	Wellington Phoenix (Note: Wellington Phoenix cannot qualify for the AFC Champions League as they are not recognised as an AFC club.)	27	11	7	9	46	43	+3	40	Qualification for Finals series
7	Newcastle Jets	27	10	5	12	40	36	+4	35	
8	Western Sydney Wanderers	27	6	6	15	42	54	−12	24	
9	Brisbane Roar	27	4	6	17	38	71	−33	18	
10	Central Coast Mariners	27	3	4	20	31	70	−39	13	

Source: A-Leagues
Rules for classification: 1) points; 2) goal difference; 3) number of goals scored.
(C) Champions

==== Results summary ====
Overall								Home						Away					
Pld	W	D	L	GF	GA	GD	Pts	W	D	L	GF	GA	GD	W	D	L	GF	GA	GD
27	10	5	12	40	36	+4	35	5	4	4	18	15	+3	5	1	8	22	21	+1

Last updated: 6 April 2019.

==== Results by round ====
Round	1	2	3	4	5	6	7	8	9	10	11	12	13	14	15	16	17	18	19	20	21	22	23	24	25	26	27
Ground	A	A	H	H	A	A	H	H	A	H	A	H	A	A	H	A	A	H	H	H	A	H	A	H	A	A	H
Result	L	D	L	D	W	L	W	L	W	L	L	D	L	L	W	L	W	D	W	D	W	L	L	W	L	W	W
Position	9	8	10	9	7	7	6	7	7	7	7	7	7	7	7	7	7	7	7	7	7	7	7	7	7	7	7

Updated to match(es) played on 6 April 2019. Source:
A = Away; H = Home; W = Win; D = Draw; L = Loss

==== Matches ====
Win Draw Loss

21 October 2018 1	Wellington Phoenix	2–1	Newcastle Jets	Wellington
15:00 AEST	Georgievski 32' (o.g.); Krishna 90'	Report	D. Petratos 90+5'	Stadium: Westpac Stadium; Attendance: 9,174; Referee: Daniel Elder

26 October 2018 2	Adelaide United	1–1	Newcastle Jets	Adelaide
19:20 ACDT	Goodwin 63'	Report	Vargas 52'	Stadium: Coopers Stadium; Attendance: 7,906; Referee: Shaun Evans

3 November 2018 3	Newcastle Jets	0–1	Melbourne Victory	Newcastle
19:50 AEST		Report	Antonis 71'	Stadium: McDonald Jones Stadium; Attendance: 11,813; Referee: Chris Beath

10 November 2018 4	Newcastle Jets	1–1	Sydney FC	Newcastle
19:50 AEST	Cowburn 87'	Report	Brosque 20'	Stadium: McDonald Jones Stadium; Attendance: 11,415; Referee: Shaun Evans

23 November 2018 5	Western Sydney Wanderers	0–2	Newcastle Jets	Sydney
19:50 AEST		Report	Hoffman 25'; Vargas 90+4'	Stadium: Spotless Stadium; Attendance: 10,458; Referee: Jumpei Iida (Japan)

2 December 2018 6	Melbourne City	3–0	Newcastle Jets	Melbourne
19:00 AEST	McGree 2'; Brattan 45'; Wales 75'	Report		Stadium: AAMI Park; Attendance: 6,013; Referee: Alex King

9 December 2018 7	Newcastle Jets	2–0	Brisbane Roar	Newcastle
17:00 AEST	Sheppard 45'; Jair 58'	Report		Stadium: McDonald Jones Stadium; Attendance: 9,719; Referee: Kurt Ams

16 December 2018 8	Newcastle Jets	0–2	Perth Glory	Newcastle
17:00 AEST		Report	Kilkenny 3' (pen.); Davidson 25'	Stadium: McDonald Jones Stadium; Attendance: 6,701; Referee: Stephen Lucas

23 December 2018 9	Central Coast Mariners	1–2	Newcastle Jets	Central Coast
17:00 AEST	Simon 36'	Report	Hoffman 66'; Vargas 82'	Stadium: Central Coast Stadium; Attendance: 8,923; Referee: Alex King

30 December 2018 10	Newcastle Jets	1–2	Adelaide United	Newcastle
19:00 AEST	O'Donovan 75'	Report	Mileusnic 38'; Goodwin 90+1' (pen.)	Stadium: McDonald Jones Stadium; Attendance: 9,005; Referee: Jarred Gillett

6 January 2019 11	Melbourne City	2–1	Newcastle Jets	Melbourne
17:00 AEST	McGree 27' (pen.); Brattan 32'	Report	O'Donovan 4'	Stadium: AAMI Park; Attendance: 7,368; Referee: Kurt Ams

2 January 2019 12	Newcastle Jets	2–2	Brisbane Roar	Newcastle
19:50 AEST	D. Petratos 5'; O'Donovan 67'	Report	Taggart 65'; Bauthéac 87'	Stadium: McDonald Jones Stadium; Attendance: 8,519; Referee: Shaun Evans

12 January 2019 13	Melbourne Victory	2–1	Newcastle Jets	Melbourne
19:50 AEST	Antonis 48'; Troisi 84'	Report	Sheppard 78'	Stadium: AAMI Park; Attendance: 16,694; Referee: Daniel Elder

19 January 2019 14	Sydney FC	1–0	Newcastle Jets	Sydney
17:35 AEST	Boogaard 44' (o.g.)	Report		Stadium: Jubilee Oval; Attendance: 12,681; Referee: Adam Fielding

23 January 2019 15	Newcastle Jets	1–0	Central Coast Mariners	Newcastle
19:50 AEST	Sheppard 54'	Report		Stadium: McDonald Jones Stadium; Attendance: 9,466; Referee: Shaun Evans

27 January 2019 16	Perth Glory	2–0	Newcastle Jets	Perth
20:00 AEST	Keogh 16'; Kilkenny 48'	Report		Stadium: HBF Park; Attendance: 11,393; Referee: Alex King

1 February 2019 17	Western Sydney Wanderers	1–5	Newcastle Jets	Sydney
19:50 AEST	Duke 69'	Report	D. Petratos 18'; Hoffman 22'; O'Donovan 45+2', 59' (pen.); Ridenton 50'	Stadium: ANZ Stadium; Attendance: 7,594; Referee: Peter Green

7 February 2019 18	Newcastle Jets	1–1	Wellington Phoenix	Newcastle
19:50 AEST	Vargas 33'	Report	Williams 58'	Stadium: McDonald Jones Stadium; Attendance: 7,394; Referee: Stephan Lucas

15 February 2019 19	Newcastle Jets	3–1	Melbourne City	Newcastle
19:50 AEST	Jair 22'; Champness 75'; O'Donovan 79'	Report	Maclaren 55'	Stadium: McDonald Jones Stadium; Attendance: 7,980; Referee: Adam Kersey

24 February 2019 20	Newcastle Jets	0–0	Adelaide United	Newcastle
17:00 AEDT		Report		Stadium: McDonald Jones Stadium; Attendance: 8,912; Referee: Adam Fielding

2 March 2019 21	Melbourne Victory	0–2	Newcastle Jets	Geelong
19:50 AEDT		Report	Koutroumbis 34'; D. Petratos 90+6'	Stadium: GMHBA Stadium; Attendance: 8,039; Referee: Shaun Evans

16 March 2019 22	Newcastle Jets	2–3	Central Coast Mariners	Newcastle
17:35 AEST	O'Donovan 74'; Vargas 81'	Report	Murray 51'; Karacan 64'; Pain 67'	Stadium: McDonald Jones Stadium; Attendance: 8,173; Referee: Adam Kersey

30 March 2019 23	Wellington Phoenix	4–1	Newcastle Jets	Wellington
17:35 AEST	Williams 1', 60' (pen.), 65'; Singh 73'	Report	O'Donovan 62'	Stadium: Westpac Stadium; Attendance: 9,028; Referee: Matthew Conger

6 April 2019 24	Newcastle Jets	3–2	Western Sydney Wanderers	Newcastle
17:35 AEST	O'Donovan 63'; Janjetović 70'; Thurgate 82'	Report	Mahazi 43'; Baccus 74'	Stadium: McDonald Jones Stadium; Referee: Adam Fielding

14 April 2019 25	Perth Glory	1–0	Newcastle Jets	Perth
17:00 AEST	Franjic 65'	Report		Stadium: HBF Park; Attendance: 11,349; Referee: Kurt Ams

20 April 2019 26	Brisbane Roar	1–6	Newcastle Jets	Brisbane
17:35 AEST	Duncan 49'	Report	Champness 23', 68'; O'Donovan 27', 55'; D. Petratos 65'; Appiah 90'	Stadium: Suncorp Stadium; Attendance: 7,985; Referee: Alex King

27 April 2019 27	Newcastle Jets	2–0	Sydney FC	Newcastle
17:35 AEST	Kantarovski 41'; D. Petratos 53'	Report		Stadium: McDonald Jones Stadium; Attendance: 10,260; Referee: Peter Green

=== FFA Cup ===
7 August 2018 Round of 32	Gold Coast Knights (Queensland)	0–1	(New South Wales) Newcastle Jets	Gold Coast
19:30 AEST		Report	Topor-Stanley 11'	Stadium: Cbus Super Stadium; Attendance: 2,222; Referee: Lara Lee

29 August 2018 Round of 16	Melbourne City (Victoria (state))	1–0	(New South Wales) Newcastle Jets	Melbourne
19:30 AEST	Fornaroli 54'	Report		Stadium: AAMI Park; Attendance: 3,673; Referee: Jonathan Barreiro

=== AFC Champions League ===
==== Qualifying play-offs ====
12 February 2019 Preliminary round 2	Newcastle Jets (Australia)	3–1 (a.e.t.)	(Indonesia) Persija Jakarta	Newcastle
19:00 AEDT	Vargas 49'; Boogaard 101'; Ridenton 120'	Report	Lestaluhu 72'	Stadium: Newcastle International Sports Centre; Attendance: 6,647; Referee: Aziz Asimov (Uzbekistan)

19 February 2019 Play-off round	Kashima Antlers (Japan)	4–1	(Australia) Newcastle Jets	Kashima
19:00 JST	S. Ito 18'; Yamamoto 32'; Serginho 67' (pen.), 90+1'	Report	Vargas 23'	Stadium: Kashima Soccer Stadium; Attendance: 5,477; Referee: Mohammed Abdulla Hassan Mohamed (United Arab Emirates)
