= Trent Buhagiar =

Maltese footballer (born 1998)

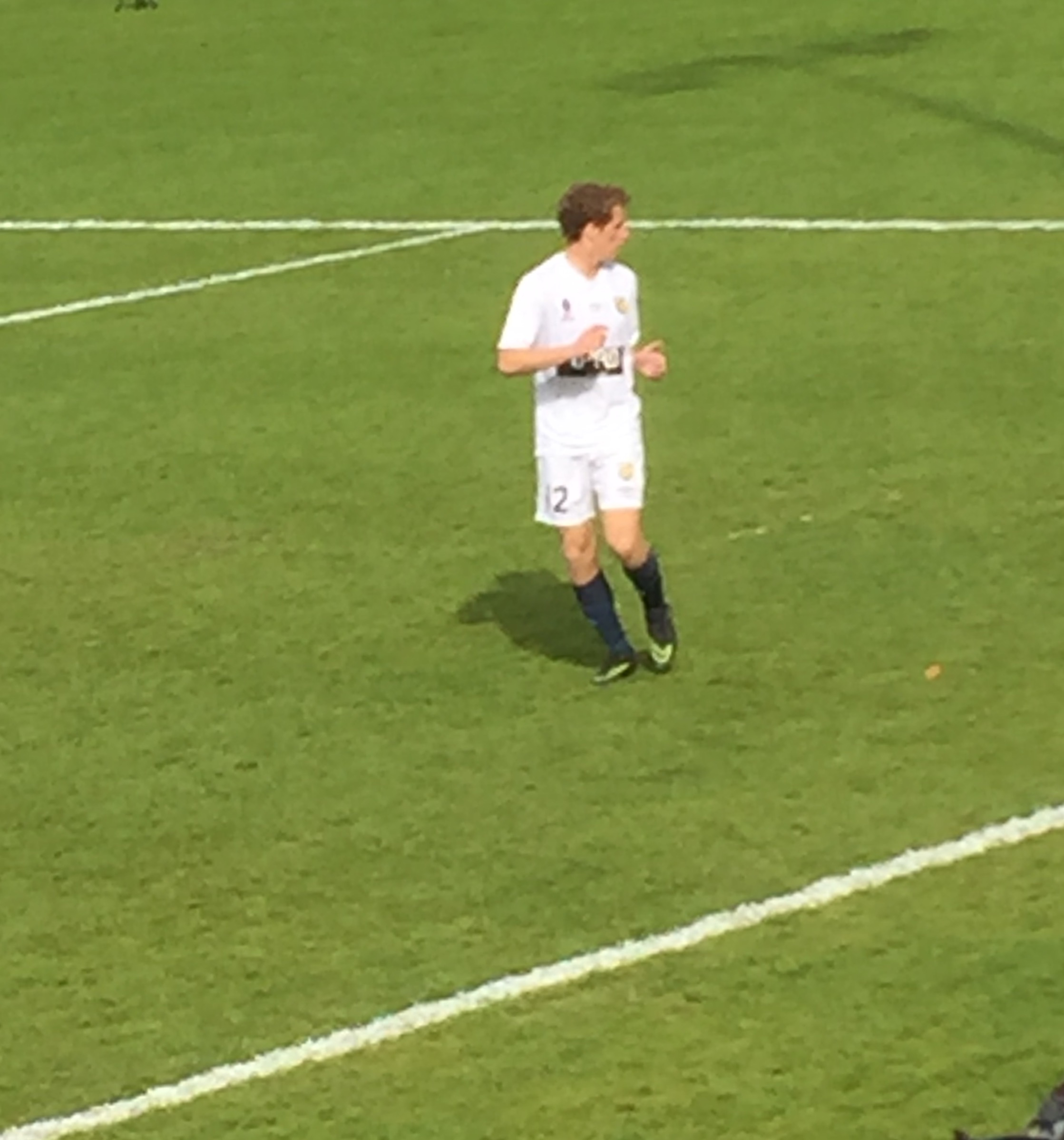
- Buhagiar playing for Central Coast Mariners in 2016

Personal information
- Full name: Trent Anthony Buhagiar
- Date of birth: 27 February 1998 (age 28)
- Place of birth: Gosford, Australia
- Height: 1.78 m (5 ft 10 in)
- Position: Winger

Team information
- Current team: Tampines Rovers
- Number: 12

Youth career
- Umina Eagles
- 2013–2016: CCM Academy

Senior career*
Years	Team	Apps	(Gls)
2014–2016	CCM Academy	49	(23)
2016–2018	Central Coast Mariners	50	(4)
2018–2022	Sydney FC	54	(9)
2022–2024	Newcastle Jets	48	(10)
2024–2025	Brescia	1	(0)
2025	Kapaz	12	(0)
2025–2026	Tampines Rovers	19	(6)
2026–	Uthai Thani	2	(0)

International career^{‡}
2017–2020	Australia U23	9	(1)
2024–	Malta	5	(0)
Medal record
Men's football
Representing Australia
AFC U-23 Asian Cup
Third place	2020 Thailand	U-23 Team
- * Club domestic league appearances and goals as of 6 March 2026 ‡ National team caps and goals as of 19:00, 26 March 2026 (UTC)

Trent Anthony Buhagiar (born 27 February 1998) is a professional footballer who plays as a winger for Thai League 1 club Uthai Thani FC. Born in Australia, he represents the Malta national team.

== Early life ==
Born in Gosford, Buhagiar moved to and grew up on the Central Coast of New South Wales, playing junior football for the Umina Eagles. He attended the International Football School at Kariong.

== Club career ==
=== Central Coast Mariners ===
Buhagiar signed a professional deal with the Central Coast Mariners on 5 January 2016. He first came into the matchday squad for a game against Melbourne City in February 2016. He scored his maiden goal on 28 December 2016 against Melbourne Victory in a 4–1 lost. In the next game, Buhagiar put on a man of the match performance where he scored and assisted a goal in a 2–2 against Melbourne City on 31 December 2016. On 4 May 2018, Buhagiar left the Central Coast Mariners.

=== Sydney FC ===
The week after leaving Central Coast Mariners, Buhagiar joined Sydney FC on 10 May 2018. Buhagiar was instrumental in the 2018 FFA Cup where he scored 4 goals in the knockout stage for the club leading them to the final of the FFA Cup. Buhagiar also went on to have a red hot form where he scored 5 goals in 6 appearances in the 2020 AFC Champions League group stage. He then helped the club to win the 2019–20 A-League title.

Buhagiar than left Sydney FC at the end of the 2021–22 season where he raked up a total of 21 goals and 9 assists in 73 appearances across all competition.

=== Newcastle Jets ===
On 24 June 2022, Buhagiar signed for Newcastle Jets. He scored 5 goals in 25 league games during the 2022–23 season and 5 goals in 23 games during the 2023–24 season. The club announced Buhagiar's departure on 29 May 2024.

=== Brescia ===
Buhagiar joined Italian side Brescia on a free transfer on 5 July 2024, signing a one-year contract. On 21 January 2025, he was released by Brescia by mutual consent.

=== Kapaz ===
On 24 January 2025, Azerbaijan Premier League club Kapaz announced the signing of Buhagiar. He made 14 appearances for the club before leaving.

=== Tampines Rovers ===
Buhagiar was announced as a new signing for the Stags ahead of the 2025–26 Singapore Premier League season. He notched three goals and an assist in his first three competitive matches for the club, earning a piece of silverware in the form of the Community Shield.

=== Uthai Thani ===
In July 2026, Buhagiar joined Thai League 1 side Uthai Thani.

== International career ==
Born in Gosford, Australia, Buhagiar is of Maltese descent.

Buhagiar was called up to the Australian under-20 national team for a training camp in July 2016.

Buhagiar made his debut for the Malta national team on 13 October 2024 in a UEFA Nations League game against Moldova at the National Stadium, Ta' Qali. He started the game and was substituted at half-time, with Malta winning the match.

Buhagiar came on as a substitute in the 2026 FIFA World Cup qualification match against Poland on 17 November 2025.

== Career statistics ==
As of 6 July 2024

Club	Season	League			Cup		Continental		Total	
Club	Season	Division	Apps	Goals	Apps	Goals	Apps	Goals	Apps	Goals
Central Coast Mariners	2015–16	A-League	5	0	0	0	—		5	0
Central Coast Mariners	2016–17	A-League	26	2	0	0	—		26	2
Central Coast Mariners	2017–18	A-League	19	2	1	0	—		20	2
Central Coast Mariners	Total		50	4	1	0	0	0	51	4
Sydney FC	2018–19	A-League	0	0	4	4	0	0	4	4
Sydney FC	2019–20	A-League	20	3	0	0	6	5	26	8
Sydney FC	2020–21	A-League	11	1	0	0	0	0	11	1
Sydney FC	2021–22	A-League	23	5	2	1	6	2	31	8
Sydney FC	Total		54	9	6	5	12	7	72	21
Newcastle Jets	2022-23	A-League Men	25	5	1	0	—		26	5
Newcastle Jets	2023-24	A-League Men	23	5	2	2	—		25	7
Newcastle Jets	Total		48	10	3	2	—		51	12
Brescia Calcio	2024-25	Serie B	1	0	1	0	—		2	0
Kapaz	2024–25	Azerbaijan Premier League	12	0	2	0	0	0	14	0
BG Tampines Rovers	2025–26	Singapore Premier League	12	2	4 (Note: 1 in Community Shield, 3 in Singapore Cup)	3 (Note: 2 in Community Shield, 1 in Singapore Cup)	15 (Note: 10 in AFC Elite 2, 5 in Shopee Cup)	10 (Note: 8 in AFC Elite 2, 2 in Shopee Cup)	31	15
Career total			164	25	14	10	27	17	205	52

== Honours ==
=== Club ===
==== Sydney ====
- A-League Championship: 2019–20
- A-League Premiership: 2019–20

==== Tampines Rovers ====
- Singapore Community Shield: 2025

=== Individual ===
- AFC Champions League Two Top Goalscorer: 2025–26
