= Jake McGing =

Australian footballer (born 1994)

Personal information
- Full name: Jake Aidan McGing
- Date of birth: 22 May 1994 (age 32)
- Place of birth: Sydney, Australia
- Height: 1.87 m (6 ft 2 in)
- Position: Right-back

Team information
- Current team: Mounties Wanderers
- Number: 4

Youth career
- Macarthur Rams
- Marconi Stallions
- 2012–2014: Western Sydney Wanderers
- 2014–2015: Central Coast Mariners

Senior career*
Years	Team	Apps	(Gls)
2013–2014	Marconi Stallions	31	(1)
2015	CCM Academy	12	(2)
2015–2019	Central Coast Mariners	82	(4)
2019	Wisła Płock	12	(0)
2019–2020	Brisbane Roar	8	(0)
2020–2024	Macarthur FC	42	(2)
2025–	Mounties Wanderers	32	(5)
- * Club domestic league appearances and goals as of 31 August 2026

Jake Aidan McGing (born 22 May 1994) is an Australian professional footballer who plays as a right-back for Mounties Wanderers in NPL NSW League Two.

== Playing career ==
McGing first played junior football for Macarthur Rams before he played senior football for Marconi Stallions. In February 2015, McGing signed a professional contract with A-League side Central Coast Mariners, having previously played for the Mariners' youth team. McGing made his debut for the Central Coast in a loss to Wellington Phoenix in the 2015 FFA Cup. He signed a two-year extension with the club in August 2015.

Originally a midfielder, McGing moved into centre back under Mariners coach Tony Walmsley. McGing scored his first A-League goal for the Mariners in November 2016, from a header in a draw against Newcastle Jets in the F3 Derby. In the 2016–17 season, McGing increasingly played back in midfield. The 2017–18 season again saw a positional shift, this time to right back.

He signed a two-year contract extension with the Mariners in January 2018.

In March 2019, it was announced that McGing would leave the Mariners, having signed with Polish Ekstraklasa side Wisła Płock. McGing left the club in June 2019, having made 12 appearances.

In June 2019, it was announced McGing would return to Australia to join new manager Robbie Fowler at the Brisbane Roar.

After one season with Brisbane, McGing signed for new local A-League club Macarthur FC for their inaugural season. After four seasons with Macarthur, he announced his retirement, aged 30.

== Personal life ==
Born in Macarthur, Sydney. McGing is the older brother of Liam McGing who is alo a footballer.

== Honours ==
Macarthur

- Australia Cup: 2022

Mounties Wanderers

- Football NSW League Two Premiership: 2026
