= Kwabena Appiah =

New Zealander footballer

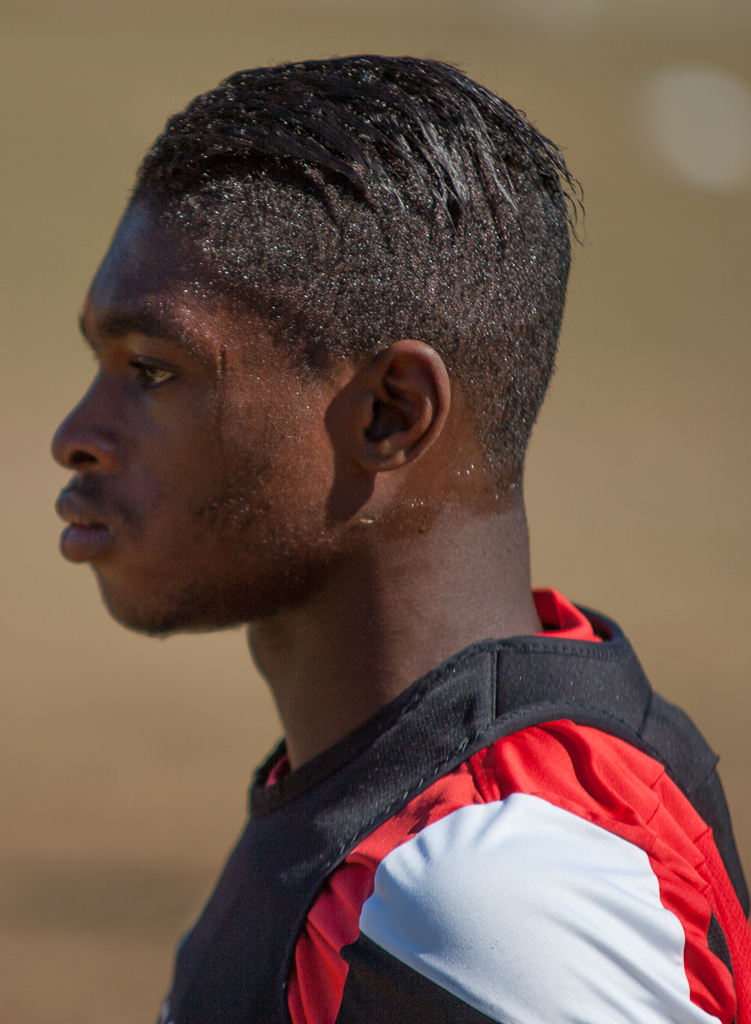
- Appiah at training

Personal information
- Full name: Kwabena Appiah-Kubi
- Date of birth: 19 May 1992 (age 34)
- Place of birth: Auckland, New Zealand
- Height: 1.80 m (5 ft 11 in)
- Position: Winger

Team information
- Current team: Campbelltown City

Youth career
- Granville Rage
- Parramatta City
- 2011: North West Sydney Spirit
- 2011–2012: Central Coast Mariners

Senior career*
Years	Team	Apps	(Gls)
2010	Granville Rage	12	(0)
2011	North West Sydney Spirit	17	(5)
2012	Parramatta FC	9	(6)
2012–2015	Western Sydney Wanderers	25	(0)
2015	Wellington Phoenix Reserves	2	(0)
2015–2016	Wellington Phoenix	16	(0)
2016–2018	Central Coast Mariners	38	(2)
2018	Incheon United	25	(1)
2019	Newcastle Jets	2	(1)
2019–2020	Western United	6	(1)
2021	Nakhon Ratchasima	14	(1)
2023	Madura United	12	(0)
2025–	Campbelltown City	15	(1)
- * Club domestic league appearances and goals as of 9 July 2025

Kwabena Appiah-Kubi (born 1992) is a New Zealand professional footballer who plays as a winger.

== Biography ==
Born in Auckland to Ghanaian parents, Appiah arrived in Sydney, Australia as a six-year-old. He started playing football in the Granville Association, and came of age in the Western Sydney region at Parramatta City, Granville Rage and Spirit FC. He lived in Parramatta and was educated at Parramatta Marist Brothers. Having never made a competitive international appearance, Appiah remains eligible for New Zealand, Australia and Ghana.

== Club career ==
=== Central Coast Mariners ===
Appiah was a part of the 2011–2012 Central Coast Mariners, A-League National Youth League winning squad in which he scored 9 goals throughout the season.

=== Western Sydney Wanderers ===
On 25 June 2012, Appiah joined Western Sydney Wanderers as one of the club's first three signed players. On 6 October he made his A-League debut against his former youth club, Central Coast Mariners, in the Wanderers' first ever competitive match.

Appiah won the A-League Minor Premiership and the Asian Champions League at his time at the club along with winning the VISY Wanderers Asian Champions League player of the year award.

On 31 January 2015, Appiah left Western Sydney Wanderers, with the players contract terminated by mutual consent.

=== Wellington Phoenix ===
On 13 February 2015 he joined Wellington Phoenix on an 18-month contract.

=== Return to Central Coast Mariners ===
At the end of his contract, Appiah was released by the Phoenix, and subsequently returned to Central Coast Mariners on trial. After a successful trial, Central Coast Mariners signed him on a one-year deal. Appiah scored his first ever A-League goal against Adelaide United on 5 February, lobbing the opposition goalkeeper. On 29 May 2017, Appiah signed a one-year contract extension with Central Coast Mariners.

=== Incheon United ===
On 31 January 2018, Appiah left the A-League to move to Korean club Incheon United. He made his debut for Incheon on the opening day of the K League 1 season against Gangwon in March. He scored his first goal for the club against Pohang Steelers in August. On 16 January 2019, Appiah left Incheon United after nearly a year with the K League 1 side.

== A-League career statistics ==
As of 11 December 2017

A-League appearances and goals by club, season and competition
Club	Season	A-League		Finals		FFA Cup		Asia		Total	
Club	Season	Apps	Goals	Apps	Goals	Apps	Goals	Apps	Goals	Apps	Goals
Western Sydney Wanderers	2012–13	12	0	1	0	0	0	0	0	13	0
Western Sydney Wanderers	2013–14	10	0	0	0	0	0	12	0	22	0
Western Sydney Wanderers	2014–15	2	0	0	0	1	0	0	0	3	0
Western Sydney Wanderers	Wanderers total	24	0	1	0	1	0	12	0	38	0
Wellington Phoenix	2014–15	2	0	0	0	0	0	0	0	2	0
Wellington Phoenix	2015–16	14	0	0	0	1	1	0	0	15	1
Wellington Phoenix	Phoenix total	16	0	0	0	1	1	0	0	17	1
Central Coast Mariners	2016–17	20	2	0	0	1	0	0	0	21	2
Central Coast Mariners	2017–18	17	0	0	0	1	2	0	0	10	2
Central Coast Mariners	Mariners total	37	2	0	0	2	2	0	0	32	4
Total		77	2	1	0	4	3	12	0	94	5

== Honours ==
=== Club ===
Central Coast Mariners

- National Youth League: 2011–12

Western Sydney Wanderers

- A-League Premiership: 2012–13
- AFC Champions League: 2014
