= Lachlan Jackson =

Australian soccer player (born 1995)

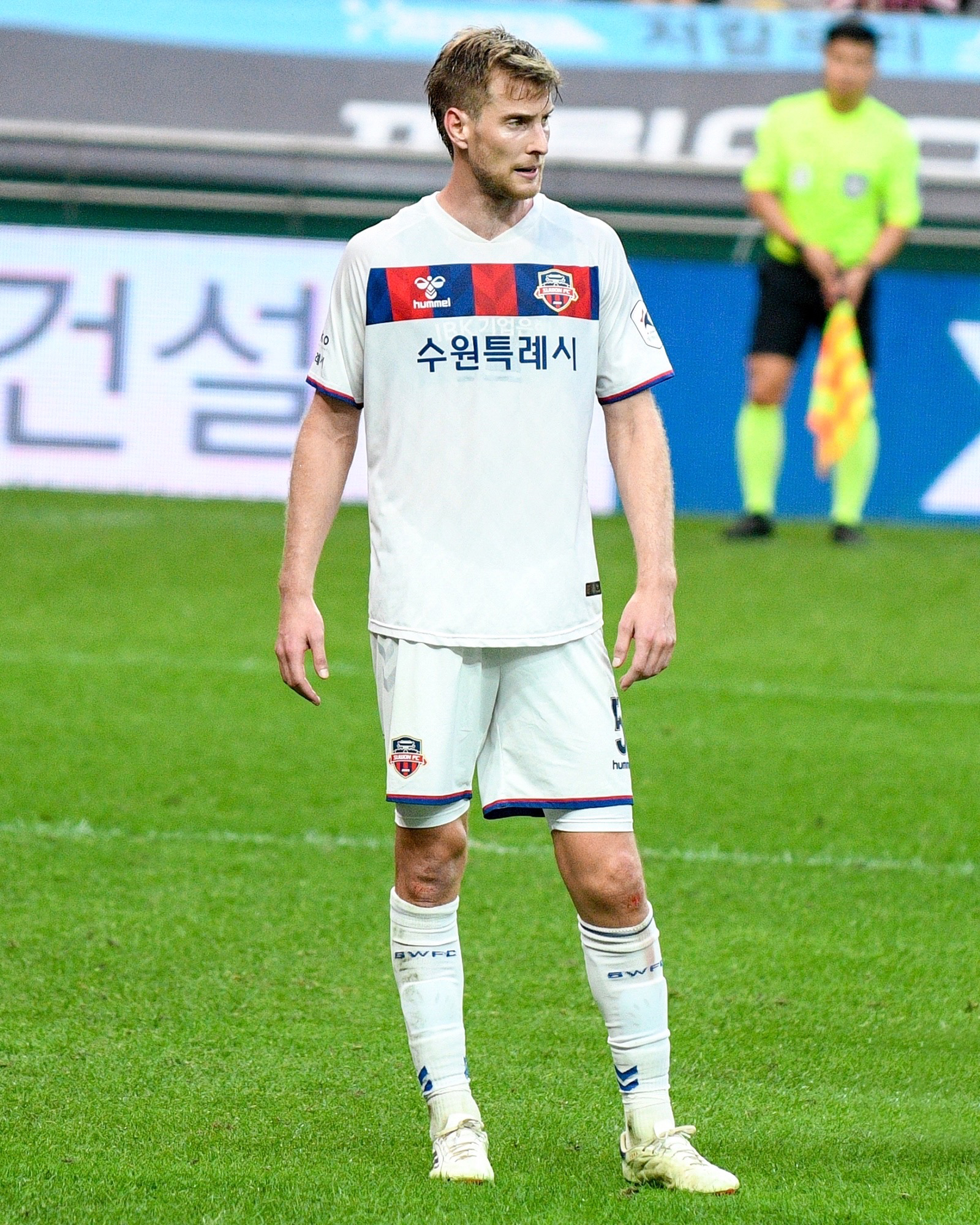
- Jackson in 2024

Personal information
- Full name: Lachlan Robert Tua Jackson
- Date of birth: 12 March 1995 (age 31)
- Place of birth: Townsville, Australia
- Height: 1.96 m (6 ft 5 in)
- Position: Centre-back

Team information
- Current team: Perth Glory
- Number: 5

Youth career
- QAS
- Brisbane Roar

Senior career*
Years	Team	Apps	(Gls)
2014–2015	Brisbane Roar NPL	17	(2)
2014–2015	Brisbane Roar	3	(1)
2015–2021	Newcastle Jets	88	(1)
2021–2025	Suwon FC	85	(5)
2025–2026	Melbourne Victory	21	(1)
2026–	Perth Glory	0	(0)

International career^{‡}
2017	Australia U23	2	(0)
- * Club domestic league appearances and goals as of 4 July 2026 (UTC) ‡ National team caps and goals as of 30 January 2022 (UTC)

Lachlan Robert Tua Jackson (born 12 March 1995) is an Australian professional soccer player who plays as a centre-back for Perth Glory in the A-League Men.

== Club career ==
=== Brisbane Roar ===
Jackson made his senior professional debut against the Melbourne Victory, entering the match as a substitute for the fatigued Luke DeVere in the 84th minute, a game which the Roar lost 2–1. Jackson continued his playing by being a starting player in the penultimate clash against the Victory at Suncorp Stadium, and proved to be a bulwark in defence despite the Roar going down 1–0 in spite of a controversial penalty. He was again chosen for the terminal match of the season, a clash against the Newcastle Jets again at Suncorp Stadium. Kofi Danning opened the scoring in the 71st minute, but the Roar couldn't prevent Edson Montaño from equalising. In the dying minutes of the match, Jet's custodian Ben Kennedy saved a shot from youthful winger Shannon Brady, yet Jackson was there to collect the rebound and finished clinically into the left corner.

=== Newcastle Jets ===
On 13 July 2015, the Newcastle Jets secured the signature of Jackson on a one-season deal. Jackson made a total of 18 appearances in his first season at Newcastle, playing at both centre back and full back throughout the year. Jackson's solid performances throughout his first season with Newcastle earned him a one-year contract extension. On 3 June 2021, the Jets announced Jackson had departed on mutual consent after accepting a deal to player overseas.

=== Suwon FC ===
In July 2021, Jackson signed for South Korean club Suwon FC.

=== Melbourne Victory ===
In January 2025, Jackson signed for Melbourne Victory FC. Across a season and a half Jackson made 23 appearances in all competitions, scoring 1 goal.

=== Perth Glory ===
On 8 July 2026, Jackson signed for A-League side Perth Glory FC on a two-year deal.

== Career statistics ==
As of match played 9 December 2023

Appearances and goals by club, season and competition
Club	Season	League			National Cup		Continental		Other		Total	
Club	Season	Division	Apps	Goals	Apps	Goals	Apps	Goals	Apps	Goals	Apps	Goals
Brisbane Roar	2014–15	A-League	3	1	0	0	0	0	—		3	1
Newcastle Jets	2015–16	A-League	18	0	0	0	—		—		18	0
Newcastle Jets	2016–17	A-League	17	0	0	0	—		—		17	0
Newcastle Jets	2017–18	A-League	11	1	0	0	—		—		11	1
Newcastle Jets	2018–19	A-League	18	0	2	0	1	0	—		21	0
Newcastle Jets	2019–20	A-League	11	0	1	0	—		—		12	0
Newcastle Jets	2020–21	A-League	13	0	—		—		—		13	0
Newcastle Jets	Total		88	1	3	0	1	0	0	0	92	1
Suwon FC	2021	K League 1	19	2	—		—		—		19	2
Suwon FC	2022	K League 1	21	2	1	0	—		—		22	2
Suwon FC	2023	K League 1	23	0	1	0	—		2	0	26	0
Suwon FC	Total		63	4	2	0	0	0	2	0	67	4
Career total			154	6	5	0	1	0	2	0	162	6
