= Mickaël Tavares =

Senegalese-French footballer (born 1982)

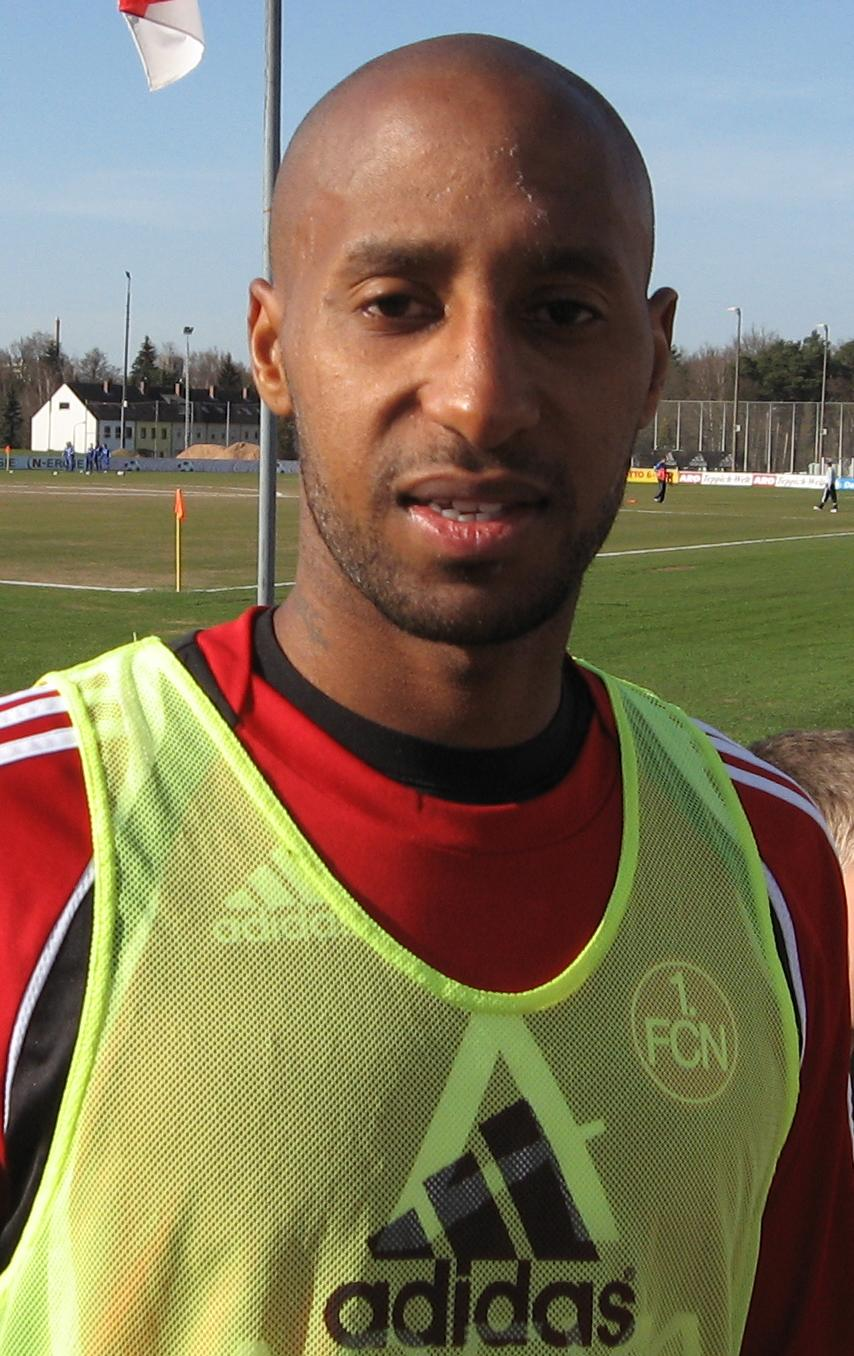
- Tavares with 1. FC Nürnberg in 2010

Personal information
- Full name: Mickaël Zidro Tavares
- Date of birth: 25 October 1982 (age 44)
- Place of birth: Villeneuve-Saint-Georges, Val-de-Marne, France
- Height: 1.85 m (6 ft 1 in)
- Position: Defensive midfielder

Youth career
- 1987–1998: FC Épinay-sous-Sénart
- 1998–2000: Créteil
- 2000–2002: Alverca

Senior career*
Years	Team	Apps	(Gls)
2002–2003	SC Abbeville	26	(9)
2003–2005	Nantes B	49	(2)
2005–2007	Tours	27	(4)
2007–2009	Slavia Prague	36	(3)
2009–2012	Hamburger SV	15	(0)
2011	Hamburger SV II	1	(0)
2010	→ 1. FC Nürnberg (loan)	11	(1)
2010–2011	→ Middlesbrough (loan)	13	(0)
2012–2013	Fulham	0	(0)
2013–2014	RKC Waalwijk	7	(0)
2014–2015	Mladá Boleslav	13	(1)
2015–2016	Sydney FC	34	(1)
2016–2017	Central Coast Mariners	8	(0)
2018	Sénart-Moissy	4	(0)
Total		244	(21)

International career
2009–2011	Senegal	10	(0)
- * Club domestic league appearances and goals

Mickaël Zidro Tavares (born 25 October 1982) is a former professional footballer who played as a defensive midfielder. Born in France, he made eleven appearances for the Senegal national team from 2009 to 2011.

== Early life ==
Mickaël Zidro Tavares was born on 25 October 1982 in Villeneuve-Saint-Georges, Val-de-Marne.

== Club career ==
Tavares began his career at US Créteil, and moved in 2000 to Portuguese club FC Alverca. After two years, he returned to France and signed a contract with SC Abbeville, for whom he scored 9 goals in 26 games in the 2002–03 season, following which he moved to FC Nantes, where he played in the reserve team. In 2005, he joined FC Tours, who were promoted a year later to the Ligue 2.

In July 2007, he was on trial at Slavia Prague, and signed a contract with the club after one week in the Czech Republic. He signed a two-year contract in Prague with the option of one more, before moving to Hamburger SV on 30 January 2009. He made his debut on 22 February 2009 against Bayer Leverkusen.

On 24 January 2010, Tavares was loaned to 1. FC Nürnberg until the end of the season. In August 2010, Tavares was assigned to train with Hamburg's second team and told he has no future in the first team. On 27 August 2010, Tavares joined Football League Championship club Middlesbrough on loan until July 2011. However, despite playing under Gordon Strachan, Tony Mowbray did not appear to rate Tavares. This limited him to just 13 appearances, his last coming in the 90th minute against Sheffield United, 4 months after his penultimate appearance.

In September 2012 he was close to sign with Bulgarian side Chernomorets Burgas.

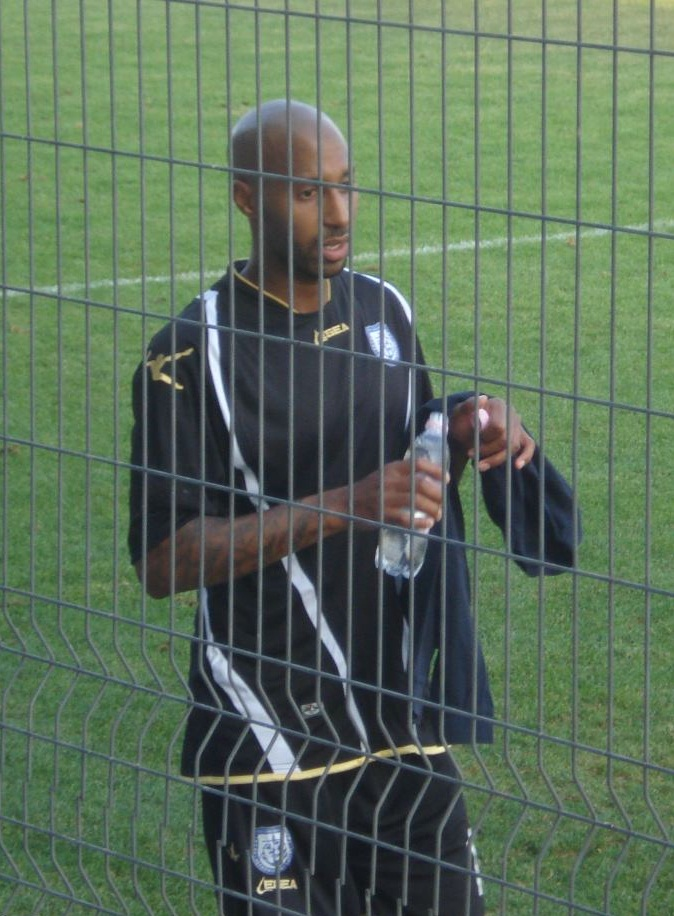
Tavares after playing for Chernomorets Burgas in friendly match.

On 5 October 2012, Tavares signed on a free transfer for Fulham. He was given the number 25 shirt, previously worn by Bobby Zamora. On 4 January 2013, Martin Jol confirmed that Tavares was not offered a new contract and had left the club. He made no appearances for Fulham.

On 25 August 2013, it was announced that Tavares would sign an amateur contract with Dutch side RKC Waalwijk. After releasing for free from Waalvijk he signed a new deal with Czech first league club FK Mladá Boleslav. In January 2015 he left Mladá Boleslav and signed with Australian club Sydney FC.

On 18 April 2016, Tavares was released by Sydney FC and shortly after signed with the Central Coast Mariners, where he would reunite with cousin Jacques Faty for the 2016–17 A-League season.

== International career ==
Tavares received a call-up from Cape Verde in May 2008 against Luxembourg in preparation for the 2010 FIFA World Cup qualification, but Tavares did not play in the match. He played for Senegal National Team, receiving his first cap in 2009.

== Personal life ==
Tavares is the son of Tony Tavares nicknamed Zagallo, a Senegalese international from ASC Diaraf and ASF Police, and also the cousin of Jacques Faty and Ricardo Faty. Tavares has a wife and a three-year-old daughter, Ciara. Tavares can speak Portuguese, having picked up the language during his time playing in Portugal with F.C. Alverca.

== Career statistics ==
=== Club ===
Appearances and goals by club, season and competition
Club	Season	League			Cup		Continental		Total	
Club	Season	Division	Apps	Goals	Apps	Goals	Apps	Goals	Apps	Goals
Tours	2005–06	National	22	4	1	0	—		23	4
Tours	2006–07	Ligue 2	5	0	1	0	—		6	0
Tours	Total		27	4	2	0	—		29	4
Slavia Prague	2007–08	Czech 1. liga	22	2	0	0	10 (Note: 4 Appearances in UEFA Champions League qualifiers, 5 appearances in UEFA Champions League, 1 appearance in UEFA Cup)	0	32	2
Slavia Prague	2008–09	Czech 1. liga	14	1	1	0	7 (Note: 2 appearances in UEFA Champions League qualifiers, 5 appearances UEFA Cup)	0	22	1
Slavia Prague	Total		36	3	1	0	17	0	54	3
Hamburger SV	2008–09	Bundesliga	12	0	1	0	0	0	13	0
Hamburger SV	2009–10	Bundesliga	3	0	0	0	4 (Note: 2 appearances in UEFA Europa League qualifiers, 2 appearances in UEFA Europa League)	0	7	0
Hamburger SV	Total		15	0	1	0	4	0	20	0
1. FC Nürnberg (loan)	2009–10	Bundesliga	11	1	—		—		11	1
Middlesbrough (loan)	2010–11	Championship	13	0	0	0	—		13	0
Hamburger SV II (loan)	2011–12	Regionalliga Nord	1	0	—		—		1	0
Fulham	2012–13	Premier League	0	0	—		—		0	0
RKC Waalwijk	2013–14	Eredivisie	7	0	1	0	—		8	0
Mladá Boleslav	2014–15	Czech 1. liga	13	1	3	0	0	0	16	1
Sydney FC	2014–15	A-League	12	0	0	0	—		12	0
Sydney FC	2015–16	A-League	22	1	1	0	3	0	26	1
Sydney FC	Total		34	1	1	0	3	0	38	1
Central Coast Mariners	2016–17	A-League	8	0	0	0	—		8	0
Sénart-Moissy	2017–18	National 3	4	0	—		—		4	0
Career total			169	10	9	0	24	0	202	10
