= Lachlan Wales =

Australian soccer player (born 1997)

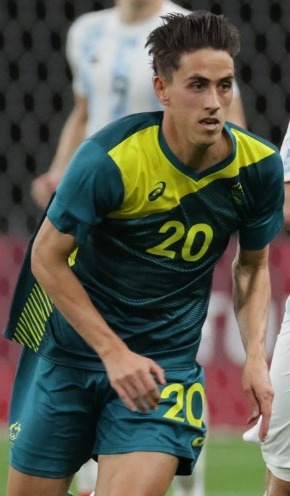
- Wales playing for Australia U23 at the 2020 Summer Olympics

Personal information
- Full name: Lachlan Andrew Wales
- Date of birth: 19 October 1997 (age 29)
- Place of birth: Terrigal, New South Wales, Australia
- Height: 1.79 m (5 ft 10 in)
- Positions: Forward; winger

Youth career
- 2013: FNSW NTC
- 2014–2015: CCM Academy

Senior career*
Years	Team	Apps	(Gls)
2016–2018	CCM Academy	52	(14)
2017–2018	Central Coast Mariners	11	(0)
2018–2020	Melbourne City	53	(3)
2020–2024	Western United	107	(14)
2024–2025	Gyeongnam	7	(1)
2025–2026	Perth Glory	13	(1)

International career^{‡}
2019–2021	Australia U-23	9	(2)
- * Club domestic league appearances and goals as of 9 June 2026 ‡ National team caps and goals as of 2 August 2021

Lachlan Andrew Wales (born 19 October 1997) is an Australian professional footballer who last played as a forward for Perth Glory.

== Club career ==
=== Central Coast Mariners ===
Wales progressed from the youth ranks of the Central Coast Mariners to make his professional debut on 14 April 2017, replacing Fábio Ferreira in the 86th minute as they were beaten 1-0 by Melbourne Victory at AAMI Park.

Wales made a further 10 appearances for the Mariners in their 2017–18 campaign, notching two assists from seven starts as they went on to finish in 10th place.

=== Melbourne City ===
On 25 June 2018, Wales signed a two-year contract with Melbourne City. He made his debut for the club in a 2–1 win over Melbourne Victory in the Melbourne Derby, playing 85 minutes before being replaced by Anthony Lesiotis. Wales scored his first professional goal against Newcastle Jets on 2 December 2018, scoring City's third as they ran out 3-0 winners.

Wales left Melbourne City at the end of the 2019–20 A-League.

=== Western United ===
On 2 October 2020, Western United announced the signing of Wales on a two-year deal.

In June 2024, Wales left Western United to pursue an opportunity overseas.

== International career ==
In November 2019 he was one of four players suspended by the Australia national under-23 soccer team due to "unprofessional conduct".

Wales qualified for the Tokyo 2020 Olympics. He was part of the Olyroos Olympic squad. The team beat Argentine in their first group match but were unable to win another match. They were therefore not in medal contention.

== Career statistics ==
=== Club ===
As of match played 27 June 2021

Appearances and goals by club, season and competition
Club	Season	League			National Cup (Note: Includes the FFA Cup)		Asia		Other		Total	
Club	Season	Division	Apps	Goals	Apps	Goals	Apps	Goals	Apps	Goals	Apps	Goals
Central Coast Mariners Academy	2016	NPL NSW 2	25	6	—		—		—		25	6
Central Coast Mariners Academy	2017	NPL NSW 2	25	8	—		—		—		25	8
Central Coast Mariners Academy	2018	NPL NSW 2	2	0	—		—		—		2	0
Central Coast Mariners Academy	Total		52	14	—		—		—		52	14
Central Coast Mariners	2016–17	A-League	1	0	0	0	—		—		1	0
Central Coast Mariners	2017–18	A-League	10	0	0	0	—		—		10	0
Central Coast Mariners	Total		11	0	0	0	—		—		11	0
Melbourne City	2018–19	A-League	26	3	3	0	—		—		29	3
Melbourne City	2019–20	A-League	27	0	3	0	—		—		30	0
Melbourne City	Total		53	3	6	0	—		—		59	3
Western United	2020–21	A-League	24	4	—		—		—		24	4
Western United	2021-22	A-League	30	4	0	0					30	4
Western United	2022-23	A-League	26	4	2	1					28	5
Western United	2023-24	A-League	27	4	3	2					30	6
Western United	Total		107	16	5	3					112	19
Gyeongnam FC	2024	K League 2	2	1	0	0					0	0
Career total			223	33	11	3	—		—		146	36
