= Jacques Faty =

Senegalese footballer (born 1984)

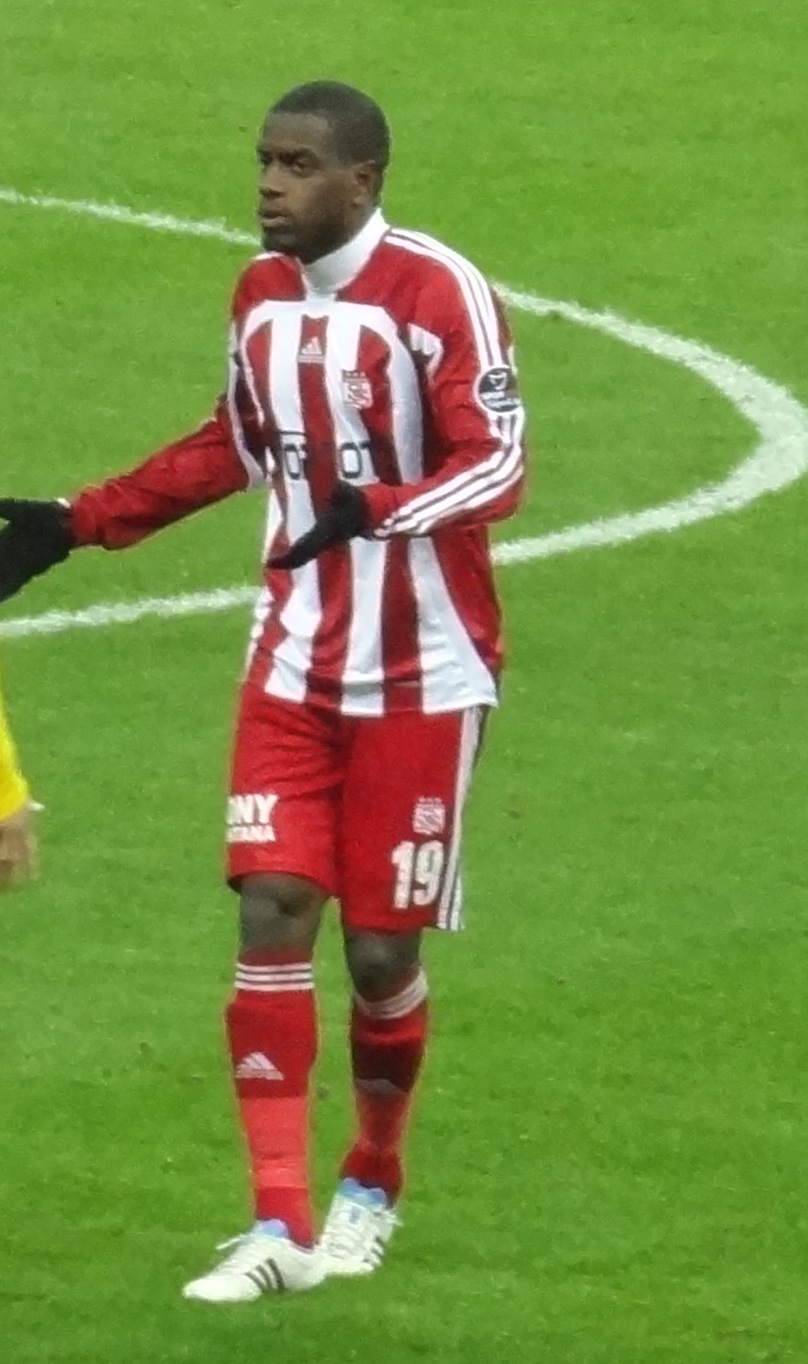
- Faty playing for Sivasspor in 2011

Personal information
- Date of birth: 25 February 1984 (age 42)
- Place of birth: Villeneuve-Saint-Georges, France
- Height: 1.83 m (6 ft 0 in)
- Position: Central defender

Youth career
- 1995–1996: FC Épinay
- 1996–1999: CS Brétigny
- 1999–2002: Rennes
- → INF Clairefontaine

Senior career*
Years	Team	Apps	(Gls)
2002–2007	Rennes	123	(0)
2007–2008	Marseille	9	(0)
2008–2011	Sochaux	83	(3)
2011–2013	Sivasspor	14	(0)
2013	→ Bastia (loan)	12	(0)
2013–2015	Wuhan Zall	12	(0)
2015–2016	Sydney FC	28	(2)
2016–2017	Central Coast Mariners	8	(0)
Total		289	(5)

International career
2003–2006	France U-21	18	
2009–2012	Senegal	12	(0)
- * Club domestic league appearances and goals

Jacques Faty (born 25 February 1984) is a former professional footballer who played as a central defender. Born in France, he represented Senegal at international level.

== Club career ==
=== Rennes ===
Born in Villeneuve-Saint-Georges, Val-de-Marne, Faty was coached at the well-known Clairefontaine Youth Centre before joining Rennes as a youth in 2001, signing on professional terms in 2002. He became an integral part of the 2003–04 Rennes team which historically achieved qualification to the UEFA Cup.

Faty started to lose his place in the team following the arrival of Ghanaian John Mensah early in 2006. The departure of coach László Bölöni to manage AS Monaco did not help his claim either. Pierre Dréossi came in to fill in the vacant coach's position and used Grégory Bourillon and Mensah as the main central defence partnership for the 2006–07 season.

Faty became more and more unsettled as the season went on, and in October 2006 his patience ran out. Faty announced his desire to leave the club when his contract was due to expire in June 2007. A knee injury to Mensah gave him a run in the side, and to his credit, he put in some decent performances, finishing with 24 games in the season. The Rennes management tried to keep him at the club by giving him an extension to his contract, but he declined and opted to join Marseille and enjoy a new experience at "France's top club" as he said when he signed his contract.

=== Marseille ===
Faty's stay at Marseille was short-lived. After experiencing the highs of UEFA Champions League and Europa League competition, he was unable to break the first team with only nine appearances.

=== Sochaux ===
He moved on to fellow Ligue 1 team FC Sochaux where he spent three seasons.

=== Sivasspor ===
He left Sochaux for Turkish Süper Lig club Sivasspor.

Faty returned to Ligue 1 when he was loaned to Bastia from Sivasspor in January 2013.

=== Wuhan Zall ===
Following this, he moved to the Chinese Super League with Wuhan Zall in mid-2013.

=== Stints in Australia ===
On 11 January 2015, he signed for Australian side Sydney FC for the rest of the season, becoming the second player acquired by the club in the transfer window, being an injury replacement for vice-captain. Sasa Ognenovski. On 11 April 2016, Faty was released from his contract by mutual consent.

On the same day of his release, Faty agreed to a one-year deal with the Central Coast Mariners.

== International career ==
Faty is an accomplished player in the youth level of international football.

In 2001, he captained France's FIFA U-17 World Championship squad to a first-place finish. Faty was a regular starter of the French U-21 international squad. He took part in the 2006 UEFA European Under-21 Football Championship held in Portugal where the French finished as losing semi-finalists. He is no longer available for selection after exceeding the age limit.

Faty made his international debut for the Senegal national team on 26 August 2009.

== Style of play ==
Faty's primary position is central defence but he has also been fielded in midfield.

== Personal life ==
Faty was born in France to a Senegalese-Vietnamese father and Cape Verdean mother, he is a practising Muslim. He is the elder brother of fellow footballer Ricardo Faty and is the cousin of former Mariners teammate Mickaël Tavares.

== Career statistics ==
=== Club ===
Appearances and goals by club, season and competition
Club	Season	League			National cup		League cup		Continental		Other		Total	
Club	Season	Division	Apps	Goals	Apps	Goals	Apps	Goals	Apps	Goals	Apps	Goals	Apps	Goals
Rennes	2002–03	Ligue 1	9	0	2	0	0	0	—		—		11	0
Rennes	2003–04	Ligue 1	32	0	4	0	0	0	—		—		36	0
Rennes	2004–05	Ligue 1	35	0	1	0	1	0	—		—		37	0
Rennes	2005–06	Ligue 1	23	0	4	0	1	0	3 (Note: Appearances in UEFA Cup)	0	—		31	0
Rennes	2006–07	Ligue 1	24	0	1	0	2	0	—		—		27	0
Rennes	Total		123	0	12	0	4	0	3	0	—		142	0
Marseille	2007–08	Ligue 1	9	0	0	0	1	0	5 (Note: Three appearances in UEFA Champions League and two appearances in UEFA Cup)	0	—		15	0
Sochaux	2008–09	Ligue 1	26	1	1	0	1	0	—		—		28	1
Sochaux	2009–10	Ligue 1	33	1	2	0	1	0	—		—		36	1
Sochaux	2010–11	Ligue 1	24	1	3	0	1	0	—		—		28	1
Sochaux	Total		83	3	6	0	3	0	—		—		92	3
Sivasspor	2011–12	Süper Lig	13	0	0	0	—		—		3	0	16	0
Sivasspor	2012–13	Süper Lig	1	0	0	0	—		—		—		1	0
Sivasspor	Total		14	0	0	0	—		—		3	0	17	0
Bastia (loan)	2012–13	Ligue 1	12	0	0	0	0	0	—		—		12	0
Wuhan Zall	2013	Chinese Super League	12	0	0	0	—		—		—		12	0
Sydney FC	2014–15	A-League	8	1	0	0	—		—		2	0	10	1
Sydney FC	2015–16	A-League	20	1	0	0	—		0	0	—		20	1
Sydney FC	Total		28	2	0	0	—		0	0	2	0	30	2
Central Coast Mariners	2016–17	A-League	8	0	0	0	—		—		0	0	8	0
Career total			289	5	18	0	8	0	8	0	5	0	328	5
