= Luke Giverin =

English footballer (born 1993)

Personal information
- Date of birth: 4 February 1993 (age 33)
- Place of birth: England
- Position: Defender

Senior career*
Years	Team	Apps	(Gls)
2012–2013	Manchester United FC	0	(0)
2012–2013	Royal Antwerp FC	24	(2)
2014–2015	Hyde United FC	32	(0)
2015–2016	Salford City FC	12	(0)
2015	→ Atherton Collieries FC (loan)	1	(0)
2016	Manly United FC		
2017	Dulwich Hill FC	21	(16)
2017–2019	Atherton Collieries		
- * Club domestic league appearances and goals

Luke Giverin (born 4 February 1993) is an English former footballer who played as a defender.

== Early life ==
Giverin was born in 1993 in England. He joined the youth academy of English Premier League side Manchester United FC at the age of seven.

== Career ==
Giverin started his career with English Premier League side Manchester United FC. He was regarded as a prospect while playing for the club. In 2012, he signed for Belgian side Royal Antwerp FC. On 25 November 2012, he scored his first goal for the club during a 1–2 loss to KV Oostende. In 2015, he signed for English side Salford City FC. In 2014, he signed for English side Hyde United FC. He suffered relegation while playing for the club. In 2016, he signed for Australian side Manly United FC. He scored his first goal for the club against Hakoah Sydney City East FC. In 2017, he signed for Australian side Dulwich Hill FC. After that, he signed for English side Atherton Collieries FC.

== Style of play ==
Giverin mainly operates as a defender. He was able to operate as a left-back or right-back. He has been described as "your typical English player — good feet and doesn't shy away from a tackle". He is left-footed.

== Personal life ==
Giverin is a native of Salford, England. His family are supporters of English Premier League side Manchester United FC.
