= Woden Park =

Sports venue in Canberra, Australia

- Woden Park Athletics Field
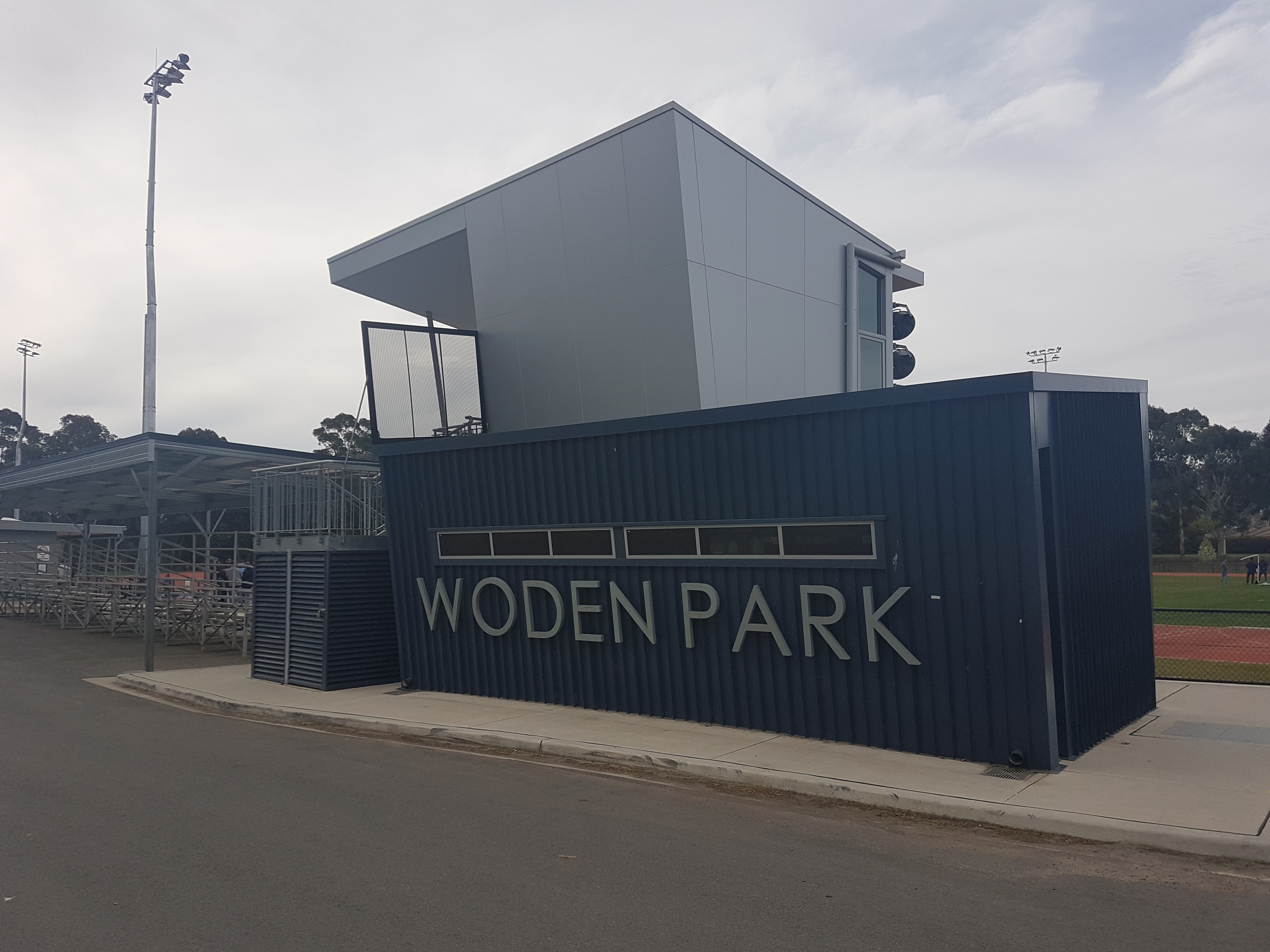
- Interactive map of Woden Park
- Location: Ainsworth St, Phillip, ACT
- Coordinates: 35°20′40″S 149°5′47″E
- Owner: ACT Government
- Capacity: 1,000
- Surface: Grass (football field) synthetic (athletics track)
- Field size: 100m x 64m (football field); 400m (athletics track)

Construction
- Opened: 1973 (53 years ago)
- Renovated: 22 January 2015 (11 years ago)
- Cost: $7 million
- Architect: Clarke Keller Architecture

Tenants
- Woden Weston FC; Canberra White Eagles FC; ACT Little Athletics

Website
- Woden Park Home

Woden Park (also known as Woden Park Athletics Field) is a multi-use association football stadium and athletics centre located within Woden Valley, Canberra. It is the home ground of Woden Weston FC in the NPL Capital Football as well as ACT Little Athletics.

== Stadium Facilities ==
Following the completion of the redevelopment, Woden Park is now a disabled friendly venue with the provision of a disability access ramp. The facilities are now at a level capable enough to host national football and athletics events. The other facility upgrades are listed below.

=== Football ===
- New re-laid 100m x 64m football pitch

=== Athletics ===
- New 400m synthetic running track
- New ‘photo finish’ building
- New jumping pits
- New throwing cages

=== Shared ===
- New national level floodlighting for entire complex
- New amenities building
- New security fencing
- New Internal car park
- Upgrade to existing pavilion
- Upgrade to canteen facilities
- Upgrade to office space
- Upgrade to toilets
- Upgrade to storage

== Primary Use ==
Woden Weston FC and ACT Little Athletics are the joint primary tenants of Woden Park. Woden Weston FC play home matches in the National Premier Leagues Capital Football at the stadium as well Capital Football Federation Cup matches. ACT Little Athletics runs its programs for kids aged 6 to 17 in a variety of track and field athletic sports.

== Events History ==
=== Redevelopment Grand opening ===
14 February 2015, after completion of the $7 million redevelopment, Woden Park was officially opened by ACT Sports Minister, Greens MLA Shane Rattenbury. The itinerary for the grand opening included an exhibition football match and athletics all-comers meet for kids aged six to ten before ending with an athletics meet for all-comers aged eleven and over. All participants received commemorative ribbons.

=== Inaugural Woden-Weston FC match ===
24 April 2015, Woden-Weston played their inaugural home match at Woden Park against Tuggeranong United in what was billed as the Southside derby. Under the flood-lights the Woden-Weston boys secured an historic first victory for the club in a crushing 4–0 victory. Both Pepe Varga and Tim Anderson scored braces in the match. The win not only got the club off the foot of the table but it enabled the players to lift the newly created Mount Taylor Cup that is given to the derby victors. This was the beginning of a healthy rivalry between the two clubs in the NPL Capital Football league.

=== A-League pre-season friendlies ===
Woden Park has hosted pre-season matches involving A-League opposition. The below table details these matches:

Year	Home team	Away team	Reference
2016	Capital North region Select	Central Coast Mariners	
2016	Capital South region Select	Central Coast Mariners	

== Records ==
- Coming Soon*
