= Josh Bingham =

Australian footballer (born 1994)

Personal information
- Full name: Joshua Bingham
- Date of birth: 27 December 1994 (age 31)
- Place of birth: Shellharbour, Australia
- Height: 1.91 m (6 ft 3 in)
- Position: Striker

Team information
- Current team: Hume City
- Number: 9

Youth career
- 2013–2015: Central Coast Mariners

Senior career*
Years	Team	Apps	(Gls)
2014–2015	CCM Academy	31	(14)
2015–2019	Central Coast Mariners	36	(4)
2019	Eastbourne Borough	9	(1)
2020	Hume City	5	(2)
2020	Wollongong Wolves	12	(6)
2021–	Hume City	94	(41)
- * Club domestic league appearances and goals as of 12 September 2024

Joshua Bingham (born 27 December 1994) is an Australian professional footballer who currently plays for Hume City FC. He has previously played for Central Coast Mariners FC, Eastbourne Borough F.C. and Wollongong Wolves FC. Joshua is the son of John Bingham (English footballer).
