= Jake Adelson =

Australian professional footballer

Personal information
- Full name: Jake Joseph Clifford Adelson
- Date of birth: 11 January 1996 (age 30)
- Place of birth: Sydney, Australia
- Positions: Right back; right winger

Youth career
- -2012: Blacktown City
- 2012–2014: Everton
- 2014–2015: Western Sydney Wanderers
- 2015: Central Coast Mariners

Senior career*
Years	Team	Apps	(Gls)
2015–2017	Central Coast Mariners	2	(0)
2017–2019	Newcastle Jets	1	(0)
Total		3	(0)

International career^{‡}
2014	Australia U20	2	(0)
- * Club domestic league appearances and goals as of 26 July 2017 ‡ National team caps and goals as of 11 January 2016

Jake Joseph Clifford Adelson (born 11 January 1996) is an Australian professional footballer who last played as a right back or right winger for Newcastle Jets.

Adelson played youth football in England with Everton before returning to Australia play for Western Sydney Wanderers' youth team. He made his professional debut for Central Coast Mariners in the A-League in 2015, before joining Newcastle Jets in 2017.

Adelson has represented the Australian under-20 national team.

== Club career ==
Adelson began his youth career with Blacktown City FC before signing for the Everton F.C. Academy as a sixteen-year- old. After playing for the U18s and U21s at Finch Farm, Adelson was unable to break into the first team or sign elsewhere in England (which included a trial at Huddersfield Town among others), so he decided to return to Sydney, signing with the Western Sydney Wanderers Youth squad. At season's end, Adelson trialled with Newcastle Jets FC before signing with Central Coast Mariners.

Adelson made his first professional team debut for Central Coast Mariners in the Round 7 2015–16 A-League clash versus Melbourne Victory at AAMI Park. Adelson was deployed as right winger, though he has stated his preference is to play right fullback.

Adelson was released by the Mariners in July 2017, after the 2016–17 season. He signed a two-year contract with Newcastle Jets later that month. Adelson made his first appearance for the Jets coming on as a substitute against Melbourne City in a 3–1 victory on 15 February 2019.
