= Jacob Poscoliero =

Australian soccer player

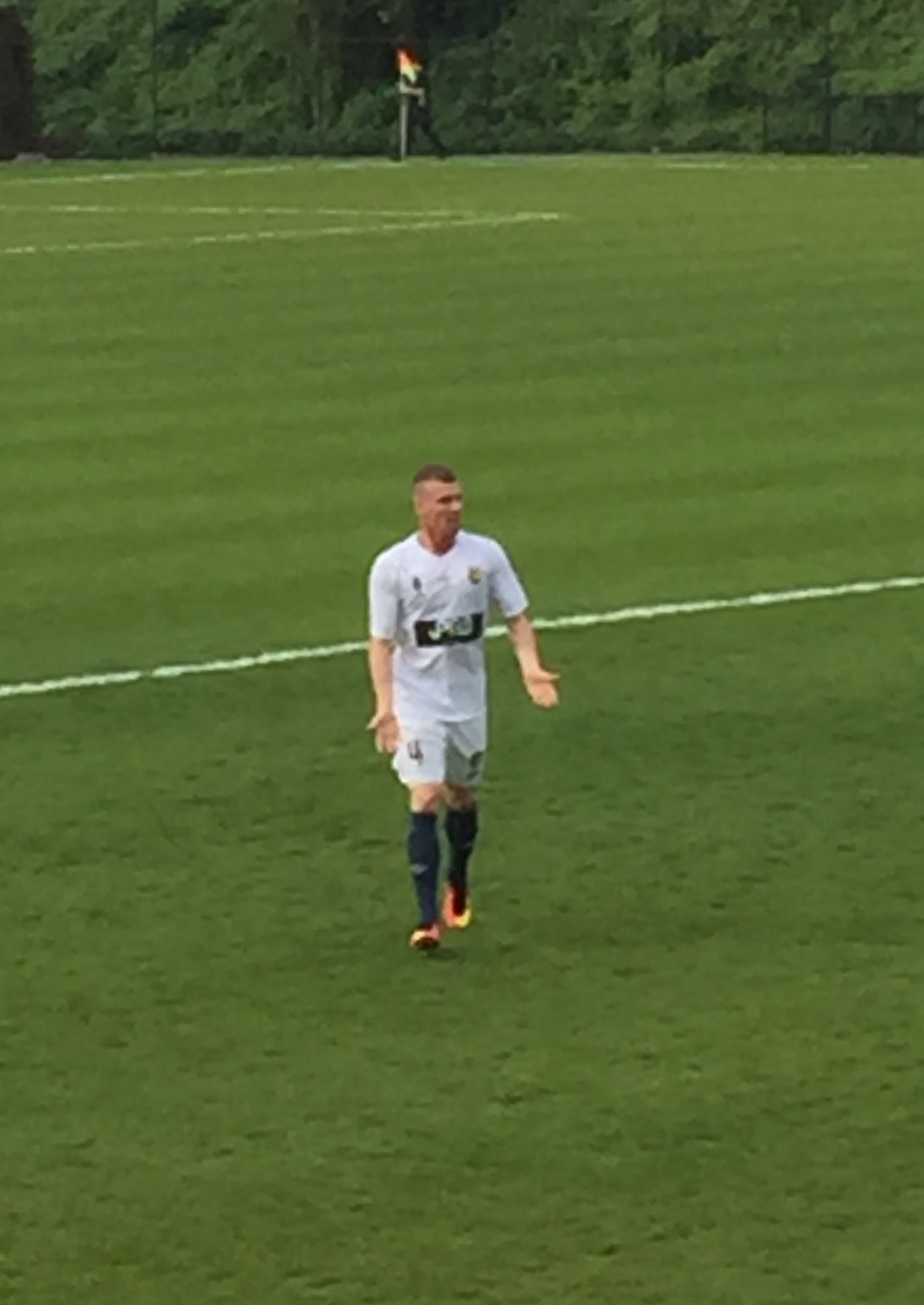
- Poscoliero playing for Central Coast Mariners in 2016

Personal information
- Full name: Jacob Robert Poscoliero
- Date of birth: 11 April 1990 (age 36)
- Place of birth: Wollongong, Australia
- Height: 1.75 m (5 ft 9 in)
- Position: Central defender

Senior career*
Years	Team	Apps	(Gls)
2010–2012	SandonàJesolo	48	(0)
2012–2013	Bassano Virtus	0	(0)
2013–2014	Blacktown City	35	(0)
2014–2017	Central Coast Mariners	47	(0)
2017–2018	Perth Glory	8	(0)
2018	Central Coast Mariners	2	(0)
2019–2020	Mounties Wanderers	28	(0)
2020–2022	Sydney United 58	29	(0)
2023–2024	South Coast Flame	52	(0)
- * Club domestic league appearances and goals as of 4 December 2024 ‡ National team caps and goals as of 21 April 2017

Jacob Robert Poscoliero (born 11 April 1990) is an Australian footballer who last played as a central defender/defensive midfielder for South Coast Flame FC.

== Club career ==
=== Central Coast Mariners ===
On 8 October 2014, Poscoliero joined the Central Coast Mariners in the A-League. Poscoliero made his senior debut 10 days later, in Central Coast Mariners' 2–1 loss to Wellington Phoenix.

=== Perth Glory ===
On 18 May 2017, Poscoliero transferred to Perth Glory.

On 30 January 2018, Perth Glory released Poscoliero after he played only eight times.

=== Return to Central Coast Mariners ===
A day after his release from Perth Glory, Poscoliero returned to previous club Central Coast Mariners. At the end of the season, Poscoliero's contract expired and wasn't renewed.

== Honours ==
Blacktown City

- National Premier Leagues NSW: 2014
- Waratah Cup: 2014

== See also ==
- List of Central Coast Mariners FC players
