= Adam Pearce (soccer) =

Australian soccer player (born 1997)

- Pearce playing for Central Coast Mariners in 2020

Personal information
- Full name: Adam Pearce
- Date of birth: 8 January 1997 (age 29)
- Place of birth: Newcastle, Australia
- Height: 1.98 m (6 ft 6 in)
- Position: Goalkeeper

Team information
- Current team: Newcastle Olympic

Youth career
- 2013–2014: Newcastle Jets
- 2014: Central Coast Mariners

Senior career*
Years	Team	Apps	(Gls)
2013	Newcastle Jets NPL	17	(0)
2014	Broadmeadow Magic	15	(0)
2014–2021	Central Coast Mariners	6	(0)
2016–2020	CCM Academy	63	(0)
2021–	Newcastle Olympic	43	(0)
- * Club domestic league appearances and goals as of 24 August 2024 ‡ National team caps and goals as of 3 April 2016

Adam Pearce (born 8 January 1997) is an Australian professional footballer who plays as a goalkeeper for Newcastle Olympic.

== Early life ==
Pearce was raised in Forster, New South Wales, before moving to Newcastle, aged fifteen. In Newcastle, he attended Hunter Sports High School. Pearce began playing football aged four, but did not move into goals until aged thirteen, previously playing as a defender.

== Playing career ==
=== Club ===
Pearce's first experience of senior football came in the Northern NSW State League Division 1, for Newcastle Jets youth, where coach (and former Australian international) Clayton Zane praised Pearce's potential and passing ability. For the 2014 National Premier Leagues season, Pearce moved to Broadmeadow Magic. In October 2014, it was announced that Pearce had joined Central Coast Mariners' youth squad to play in the 2014–15 National Youth League. He was called up to the senior squad for the first time and was an unused substitute against Sydney FC in an A-League match in November 2014 following an injury to Liam Reddy. Reddy's departure in late 2015 and suspension and international selection for Paul Izzo led Pearce and fellow young 'keeper Tom Heward-Belle to be called up to the senior side. He made his A-League debut for the Mariners in a loss to Western Sydney Wanderers in April 2016. Pearce was in A-League action again a week later, coming on as an early substitute after Paul Izzo suffered a concussion in the opening minute of an eventual loss to Newcastle Jets. On 6 April 2017, he signed a one-year professional contract with Central Coast Mariners.

In September 2021, Pearce joined Newcastle Olympic.

=== International ===
In November 2020, Pearce was called up to the Australian under-23 team for friendly matches against A-League sides.

== See also ==
- List of Central Coast Mariners FC players
