= Adam Berry (soccer) =

Australian soccer player (born 1997)

Personal information
- Full name: Adam Stephen Berry
- Date of birth: 20 February 1997 (age 29)
- Place of birth: Australia
- Position: Central midfielder

Team information
- Current team: Blacktown City
- Number: 19

Youth career
- 2000–2013: Blacktown City
- 2013–2015: Leeds United
- 2015–2016: CCM Academy

Senior career*
Years	Team	Apps	(Gls)
2015–2019	Central Coast Mariners	24	(1)
2016–2019	CCM Academy	12	(2)
2019–	Blacktown City	122	(3)

International career^{‡}
2015	Australia U20	1	(0)
- * Club domestic league appearances and goals as of 23 January 2025 ‡ National team caps and goals as of 25 February 2016

Adam Stephen Berry (born 20 February 1997) is an Australian professional soccer player who currently plays for Blacktown City.

Berry played youth football for Blacktown City, Leeds United and Central Coast Mariners before making his professional debut for the Mariners in 2016.

He has appeared for the Australian under-20 side.

== Early life ==
Berry grew up playing football in Castle Hill from age four, and attended Galston High School.

== Playing career ==
=== Club ===
In 2013, Berry signed with Leeds United's youth team on a two-year deal after thirteen years playing for Blacktown City. The deal eventuated following a match in Malaysia for the Australia under-13 side where a scout identified Berry. He made his first start for the under-18s on 4 November 2013, scoring in a 3–1 win over Derby County. In May 2015, Berry was released by Leeds.

Berry returned to Australia in mid-2015, and joined Central Coast Mariners, where he represented the senior side in pre-season matches as a trialist, including setting up a goal for Daniel Heffernan against Western Sydney Wanderers. He was later named in the Central Coast Mariners youth team. He made his competitive debut for the club in February 2016, coming on as a substitute in a loss to Melbourne City. He signed a one-year senior deal with the Mariners in May 2016. In August 2016 this was extended for an extra two seasons.

He scored his first goal for the Mariners in a 1–1 draw with Western Sydney Wanderers on 29 October 2016, finishing from close range after a defensive error by Wanderers centre half Robert Cornthwaite.

=== International ===
Berry made his debut for the Australian under-20 side in May 2015 in a loss to the United States in Gosford, coming on as a second-half substitute for Jaushua Sotirio. He was subsequently selected in the Australia squad for 2016 AFC U-19 Championship qualification.

== See also ==
- List of Central Coast Mariners FC players
